= McMahon (surname) =

McMahon or MacMahon (/məkˈmæn/ mək-MAN or /məkˈmɑːn/ mək-MAHN; Irish: Mac Mathúna, traditionally Mac Mathghamhna; meaning "son of the bear") is an Irish surname.

The surname came into use around the 11th century by two different Irish clans: The MacMahons of Thomond, a sept of the Dál gCais, and the MacMahons of Oriel, rulers of Airgíalla. Additionally, a separate McMahon family in County Fermanagh is descended from Mahon Maguire, a grandson of Donn Carrach Maguire. According to historian C. Thomas Cairney, the MacMahons were one of the chiefly families of the Dal gCais or Dalcassians who were a tribe of the Erainn who were the second wave of Celts to settle in Ireland between about 500 and 100 BC.

McMahon or MacMahon is the surname of the following people:

== Arts ==
- Aline MacMahon (1899–1991), American actress
- Amelia McMahon (born 1959), better known by her stage name Amy Rigby, American singer-songwriter
- Andrew McMahon (born 1982), American singer-songwriter
- Andrew "Blueblood" McMahon (1926–1984), American blues bass guitarist, singer, and songwriter
- Arthur "Mack" McMahon, founding member of Gerry and the Pacemakers
- Audrey McMahon (1898–1981), Federal Art Project, NY director
- Bernard MacMahon (filmmaker), British filmmaker
- Brad McMahon, creator of fictional animated white dog Rude Dog
- Brian McMahon, guitarist and founding member of Electric Eels
- Bryan MacMahon (writer) (1909–1998), Irish writer
  - Bryan MacMahon (judge) (born 1941), Irish High Court judge, son of the writer
- Bryan McMahon, Irish drummer, founding member of Future Kings of Spain and Badself
- Cambella McMahon, pseudonym of Sharon McPherson (1965–2021), Scottish writer and book publisher
- Charles MacMahon (disambiguation), several people:
  - Charles MacMahon (politician) (1824–1891), Australian MP and police commissioner
  - Charles MacMahon (theatre) (1861–1917), Australian theatrical entrepreneur and filmmaker
- Charlie McMahon (born 1951), Australian didgeridoo player
- Chris "CJ" McMahon, former vocalist of Australian deathcore band Thy Art Is Murder
- Chris McMahon, founding member and bassist, keyboardist, and vocalist of progressive rock band Haze
- Ciarán Mac Mathúna (1925–2009), Irish broadcaster
- Conor McMahon, Irish film writer and director, known especially for Let the Wrong One In (2021)
- Craig McMahon, film writer, director, and producer, known for the 2020 American musical drama film Sweet Sunshine
- Damon McMahon (born 1980), American indie rock musician
- Daniel McMahon (born 1982), American multi-instrumentalist, record producer, and audio engineer
- Daniel McMahon, keyboardist and founding member of Woven Hand
- Danielle McMahon, of Big Brother 15 (UK)
- Danny McMahon, drummer of progressive rock band Haze
- David McMahon, television writer, director, and producer, known for Ken Burns's Muhammad Ali (miniseries)
- Éabha McMahon (born 1990), Irish singer
- Ed McMahon (1923–2009), American entertainer
- Ella MacMahon (1864–1956), Irish romance novelist and daughter of Rev. John Henry MacMahon
- Ella McMahon (born 1994), British singer and songwriter, better known as Ella Eyre
- Ellen McMahon (born 1951), American graphic designer and professor
- Frank McMahon (author) (1919–1984), American-Irish playwright and broadcasting executive
- Frank McMahon (poet) (1926–2010), Australian poet
- Franklin McMahon (1921–2012), American artist-reporter
- George McMahon (actor) (born 1985), Irish actor
- Geraldine McMahon, British-Irish harpist and singer
- Gerard McMahon, English singer-songwriter
- Gregan McMahon (1874–1941), Australian actor, theatrical director, and producer
- Henry McMahon, member of the band Big Tom and The Mainliners
- Horace McMahon (1907–1971), American actor
- Ivor McMahon (1924–1972), English violinist
- Jenna McMahon (1925–2015), American actress
- Jennifer McMahon (writer) (born 1968), American novelist
- Jennifer A. McMahon (1956–2023), Australian philosopher
- Jenny McMahon (born 1957), New Zealand nurse and nutritionist
- Joe McMahon, original drummer for rock band Chubby and the Gang
- Joe McMahon, guitarist and lead vocalist for the punk rock band Smoke or Fire
- John J. McMahon (architect) (1875–1958), American architect
- Julian McMahon (1968–2025), Australian actor
- Kaley McMahon, lyricist for musical plays, best known for writing the lyrics to Twisted (musical)
- Katie McMahon, Irish singer, harpist, and soloist with the original Riverdance troupe
- Kevin McMahon (disambiguation), multiple people
  - Kevin McMahon (musician) (born 1953), American industrial rock musician, singer, and songwriter
  - Kevin R. McMahon (born 1962), American conductor and composer
- Liam McMahon (born 1976), Northern Irish actor
- Lynne McMahon, American poet
- Matt McMahon (pianist), Australian jazz pianist and composer
- Michael McMahon, film and TV producer, founder of Matchbox Pictures
- Mike McMahon (comics) (born 1954), British comics artist
- Neil McMahon (born 1949), American novelist
- Paul McMahon, founding member, guitarist, and vocalist of progressive rock band Haze
- Richard McMahon (pianist), British pianist and music professor
- Ryan McMahon (disambiguation), multiple people
- Savannah D. McMahon, film actor, known for starring in the 2020 American film Sweet Sunshine
- Seamus McMahon, member of the band Big Tom and The Mainliners
- Sonia McMahon (1932–2010), Australian socialite and philanthropist
- Steve McMahon, former bassist of the deathcore band Carnifex
- Terry McMahon, Irish director, writer, and actor
- Thomas A. McMahon (actor), best known for playing Spiro in the 2006 film The Killing of John Lennon
- Thomas D. McMahon, architect, known for designing the Prince of Wales Hotel in Waterton Park, Alberta, Canada
- Tim McMahon, lead singer of Mouthpiece, Hands Tied, and Triple Threat
- Tony MacMahon (1939–2021), Irish button accordion player and radio and television broadcaster
- Victor McMahon (1903–1992), Australian flautist and professor

== Humanities ==
- Darrin M. McMahon (born 1965), historian, author, public speaker, and the Mary Brinsmead Wheelock Professor of History at Dartmouth College
- Jennifer A. McMahon (1956–2023), Australian philosopher and professor emerita at the University of Adelaide
- Robert J. McMahon, American historian of the foreign relations of the United States and a scholar of the Cold War who holds the chair of Ralph D. Mershon Distinguished Professor at Ohio State University

== Politics and nobility ==
- Amy MacMahon, Australian politician
- Brien McMahon (1903–1952), American lawyer and US Senator
- Colleen McMahon (born 1951), senior United States district judge
- Edward McMahon (MP) (died 1901), Irish Home Rule League politician
- Eleanor McMahon (born c. 1962), Canadian politician
- George McMahon (c.1902 – 1970), attempted assassination of King Edward VIII of the United Kingdom
- George McMahon (politician) (1929–2019) Canadian politician
- Harvey Harold McMahon (1887–1959), Canadian merchant and political figure
- Sir Henry McMahon (1862–1949), British soldier and High Commissioner in Egypt
- Hugh McMahon (born 1938), Scottish politician
- James McMahon (Canadian politician) (1830–1909), Ontario doctor and political figure
- James E. McMahon, American politician
- Jim McMahon (politician) OBE FRSA (born 1980), British Member of Parliament
- Colonel Sir John McMahon, 1st Baronet (c.1754–1817), Irish-born politician, Private Secretary to the Sovereign, and McMahon baronet
  - McMahon baronets – There have been two baronetcies created for members of the McMahon family, both in the Baronetage of the United Kingdom, and belonging to different branches of the same family. One creation is extant as of 2007.
    - The McMahon Baronetcy, of Ashley Manor, was created in the Baronetage of the United Kingdom on 7 August 1817 for John McMahon, Member of Parliament for Aldeburgh from 1802 to 1812 and Private Secretary to George IV from 1811 to 1817. He was the brother of the first baronet of the 1815 creation.
- John McMahon, Justice of the Ontario Superior Court of Justice, known for his role in the 2010–2017 Toronto serial homicides
- John A. McMahon (1833–1923), American politician
- John McMahon (Australian politician) (1914–1975), Australian politician, member of the New South Wales Legislative Assembly from 1950 until 1968, and member of the Labor Party, holding ministerial positions including Minister for Transport and Minister for Lands
- John N. McMahon (born 1929), former senior U.S. official of the Central Intelligence Agency
- Larry McMahon (1929–2006), Irish Fine Gael politician who served both as a Teachta Dála (TD) and as a Senator
- Les McMahon (1930–2015), Australian plumber, gasfitter, drainer, and politician
- Lylea McMahon (born 1971), former Australian politician
- Mary-Margaret McMahon (born 1966), Canadian politician
- Melissa McMahon (born 1976), Australian politician
- Michael MacMahon (politician) (1854–1931), Australian politician
- Michael McMahon (born 1957), American politician and attorney
- Michael McMahon (Scottish politician) (born 1961), Scottish politician
- Michael Hubert McMahon, former mayor of Balmain, New South Wales, Australia (January 1942 – 9 November 1942) and father of John McMahon (Australian politician), who served as Balmain Alderman (1942–1944) and State MP for Balmain (1950–1968)
- The MacMahon family of French aristocrats
  - Patrice de MacMahon (1808–1893), president of France 1873–1879
- Patrick McMahon (MP) (1813–1875), Irish Liberal, Independent Irish Party, and Radical politician
- P. J. McMahon (politician) (1888–1939), American politician from Nebraska
- Sir Richard James McMahon (born 1962), British barrister and Bailiff of Guernsey
- Richard Randolph McMahon (1852–1935), West Virginia lawyer and Solicitor of the United States Treasury
- Ryan McMahon, Executive of Onondaga County, New York
- Samantha Jane McMahon, Australian politician
- Sarah McMahon, mayor of the City of Hawkesbury, New South Wales, Australia (2022–current)
- Siobhan McMahon (born 1984), Scottish politician and daughter of Michael McMahon (Scottish politician)
- Lady Sonia McMahon (née Hopkins; 1932 – 2010), Australian socialite, philanthropist, wife of Australian Prime Minister William McMahon, and mother of actor Julian McMahon
- Steve McMahon (consultant), American lawyer and media consultant who has worked on political campaigns for Democratic candidates including Ted Kennedy, Howard Dean, and Dick Gephardt and is a founding partner of both Purple Strategies and McMahon Squier and Associates
- Tom McMahon (Democratic operative), American political operative
- Thomas M. "Tom" McMahon, former mayor of Reading, Pennsylvania
- Sir Thomas McMahon, 2nd Baronet (1779–1860), Lieutenant-General in the British Army; full brother of Sir William MacMahon, 1st Baronet, Master of the Rolls in Ireland; and younger half-brother of Sir John McMahon, 1st Baronet
- Sir Thomas Westropp McMahon, 3rd Baronet, CB (1813–1892), General in the British Army and eldest son of Sir Thomas McMahon, 2nd Baronet
- Wendy McMahon (born 1951), former Canadian politician
- Sir William MacMahon, 1st Baronet (1776–1837), Irish barrister; judge; member of a Limerick family that became politically prominent through their influence with the Prince Regent, later King George IV; and the first of the McMahon Baronets of Dublin
  - McMahon baronets – There have been two baronetcies created for members of the McMahon family, both in the Baronetage of the United Kingdom, and belonging to different branches of the same family. One creation is extant as of 2007.
    - The McMahon Baronetcy, of Dublin, was created in the Baronetage of the United Kingdom on 6 May 1815 for William MacMahon, who was Master of the Rolls in Ireland. The title became extinct on the death of the fourth Baronet in 1926.
- Sir William McMahon "Billy McMahon" (1908–1988), prime minister of Australia 1971–1972

== Religion ==
- Bernard MacMahon (bishop) (1680–1747), Irish bishop
- Bernard MacMahon (Irish bishop), Irish Bishop
- Don S. McMahon, retired Australian Seventh-day Adventist medical doctor, noted for making "pseudoscientific claims, historical errors, and misleading comparisons"
- Dorothy McRae-McMahon, (born 1934), retired Australian Uniting Church minister and activist
- Heber MacMahon (1600–1650), Irish bishop and general
- Hugh MacMahon (1660–1737), Irish bishop
- James McMahon (priest) (1817–1901), Irish-born priest
- Rev. John Henry MacMahon (1829–1900), Church of Ireland cleric, known as a scholar of patristics and the scholastic philosophers, and father of prolific Irish romance novelist Ella MacMahon
- John J. McMahon (bishop) (1875–1932), American prelate of the Roman Catholic Church
- Lawrence Stephen McMahon (1835–1893), Canadian-born American prelate of the Catholic Church
- Michael Peter MacMahon (1720–1807), Irish Dominican friar
- Séamus mac Pilib Mac Mathghamhna (died 1519), Bishop of Derry
- Thomas McMahon (bishop) (1936–2025), English Roman Catholic bishop
- William Ponsonby McMahon (1852–1933) Australian Catholic newspaperman

== Science and medicine ==
Suzanne McMahon (2026) Senior Clinical Scientist, Royal Marsden Hospital (born Dublin, Ireland).
- April McMahon FRSE FBA FLSW (born 1964), British academic administrator and linguist
- Bernard McMahon (1775–1816), Irish-American horticulturist who settled in Philadelphia, served as one of the stewards of the plant collections from the Lewis and Clark Expedition, and was the author of The American Gardener's Calendar: Adapted to the Climates and Seasons of the United States
- Brian MacMahon (1923–2007), British-American epidemiologist
- Brigadier Brian McMahon (New Zealand Army officer) CBE KStJ (born 1929), retired New Zealand Defence Force officer and former venereologist
- Lieutenant-General Charles Alexander McMahon FRS FGS (1830–1904), Anglo-Irish soldier, geologist, and administrator in British India
- Chris McMahon (academic) (born 1955), British mechanical engineer, academic, and researcher
- Douglas G. McMahon, award-winning prolific professor of Biological Sciences and Pharmacology at Vanderbilt University
- Frederick McMahon Gaige (1890–1976), American entomologist and herpetologist
- Howard O. McMahon (1914–1990), Canadian-born American electrical engineer, inventor of the Gifford-McMahon cryocooler, and the Science Director, Vice President, Head of the Research and Development Division, and then President of Arthur D. Little, Inc
- James McMahon (astronomer), contemporary American amateur astronomer
- James McMahon (inventor and engineer), who, along with Kathy Olson McMahon, made several improvements to Inkjet technology
- James McMahon (mathematician) (1856–1922), Irish mathematician
- Jenny McMahon, New Zealand nurse and nutritionist
- Kathy Olson McMahon, who, along with James McMahon (inventor and engineer), made several improvements to Inkjet technology
- Lee E. McMahon (1931–1989), American computer scientist
- Mike McMahon, inventor, known for developing Emacs-like text editors EINE and ZWEI for Lisp machines
- Mike McMahon (professor), English surgeon
- Percy Alexander MacMahon (1854–1929), British soldier and mathematician
- Stephen Brendan "Mac" McMahon (1954–2021), FMedSci, Sherrington Professor of Physiology at King's College London, Director of the Wellcome Trust / London Pain Consortium, and leader of a world-renowned research laboratory at the Wolfson Centre for Age-Related Diseases
- Theresa McMahon (1878–1961), American economist
- Thomas A. McMahon (1943–1999), American professor of applied mechanics and biology, novelist

== Sports ==
- A. McMahon, alias of Arnold Horween, American football player for Harvard Crimson and in the NFL
- Allan "Macca" McMahon (1954–2003), Australian professional rugby league footballer and coach
- Ann McMahon (born 1994), Australian rules footballer
- Art McMahon (born 1946), former professional American football defensive back
- Bethany Calcaterra-McMahon (born 1974), American former luger who competed at the 1994 and 1998 Winter Olympics
- Bill McMahon, former Hong Kong international lawn bowler; husband of Rosemary McMahon and father of Mark McMahon
- Billy McMahon (athlete) (1910–1991), American Olympic long-distance runner
- Bob McMahon, former head coach and current assistant coach in the National Lacrosse League
- Bobby McMahon, Scottish association football analyst
- Brent McMahon (wheelchair racer) (Michael Brent McMahon, born 1966), Canadian Paralympic athlete
- Brian McMahon (footballer) (born 15 July 1939), former Australian rules football
- Brian McMahon (rowing) (born 1961), Canadian coxswain
- Brigitte McMahon (born 1967), Swiss triathlete
- Chris McMahon (born 1999), Major League Baseball pitcher
- Christine McMahon (born 1992), Northern Irish and Irish track and field athlete specialising in the 400 metres
- Cotie McMahon (born May 4, 2004), American college basketball player
- Cyril "Kelly" McMahon (1922–1986), Australian professional rugby league footballer
- Daryl McMahon (born 1983), Irish former footballer and current football manager
- David McMahon (born 1951), former Australian rules footballer
- David McMahon (association footballer) (born 1981), Irish former footballer
- Deonta McMahon (born 2000), American former college football running back and current Canadian Football League running back
- Diarmuid McMahon (born 1981), Irish hurler
- Doc McMahon (1886–1929), Major League Baseball pitcher
- Don McMahon (1930–1987), Major League Baseball pitcher
- Doug McMahon (1917–1997), Canadian soccer player and honoured member of the Canada Soccer Hall of Fame
- Dylan McMahon (born 2001), American football player for the Philadelphia Eagles
- Eagle Wynne McMahon (born 1998), American professional disc golfer
- Eddie McMahon (born 1885), Scottish footballer
- Elizabeth "Liz" McMahon (born 1993), American volleyball player
- Eve McMahon (born 2004), Irish Olympic sailor
- Garfield McMahon (1932–2023), Canadian sports shooter who competed at the 1960 and 1964 Summer Olympics
- Garry McMahon (1937–2008), Irish Gaelic football player
- Gerry McMahon (born 1973), Northern Irish football coach and former footballer
- Graeme McMahon (1940–2014), Australian rules football player and executive, best known as chairman of Essendon from 1997 to 2003
- Jack McMahon (baseball) (1869–1894), Major League Baseball first baseman and catcher
- Jack McMahon (1928–1989), American professional basketball player and coach
- Jim McMahon (born 1959), American football player
- Joe McMahon (born 1983), Tyrone Gaelic footballer
- John McMahon (Australian footballer, born 1900) (1900–1962), former professional Australian rules footballer
- John McMahon (Australian footballer, born 1935) (1935–2002), former professional Australian rules footballer
- John McMahon (cricketer), Australian-born cricketer who played in England
- John McMahon (Surrey and Somerset cricketer) (1917–2001), Australian-born first-class cricketer who played for Surrey and Somerset County Cricket Clubs in England from 1947 to 1957
- John McMahon (Queensland cricketer) (born 1932), Australian cricketer
- John McMahon (wrestler) (1841–1911), American professional wrestler who specialized in collar-and-elbow wrestling; he was of no relation to the McMahon family
- John McMahon (footballer, born 1964), English footballer and brother of Steve McMahon
- Johnny McMahon (English footballer), footballer who played as a centre half for Manchester City between 1902 and 1906
- Jordan McMahon (born 1983), professional Australian rules football player
- Justin McMahon, Tyrone Gaelic footballer
- Karri McMahon (born 1992), Australian field hockey player for the Hockeyroos who plays as a defender
- Kensey McMahon (born 1999), American competition swimmer who specializes in freestyle events
- Kevin McMahon (disambiguation), multiple people
  - Kevin McMahon (athlete) (born 1972), American retired track and field athlete and hammer thrower
  - Kevin McMahon (footballer, born 1946), English former footballer
  - Kevin McMahon (Australian footballer) (1930–2022), Australian rules footballer
  - Kevin McMahon (Gaelic footballer) (born 1982), Irish Gaelic footballer
  - Kevin McMahon (rower) (born 1938), Australian Olympic rower
  - Kevin McMahon, Irish high-ranking snooker player, upset by young upstart player Zhao Xintong, who was later suspended for offences relating to betting on snooker
- Len McMahon (1887–1968), New Zealand cricketer
- Lewis McMahon (born 1985), English semi-professional football midfielder
- Maddy McMahon (born 1989), retired Australian rules footballer who played for the Geelong Football Club in the AFL Women's (AFLW)
- Mannon McMahon (born 2001), American ice hockey player
- Mark McMahon (bowls) (born 1970), Scottish born indoor and lawn bowls player, who has represented England, Hong Kong, and Australia at the international level; son of Bill McMahon and Rosemary McMahon
- Mark McMahon (American football) (1878–1947), football player at the University of Texas and later the fourth football head coach of their chief rival, the University of Oklahoma
- Matt McMahon (basketball) (born 1978), American college basketball coach
- Max McMahon (born 1942), former Australian rules footballer
- Michael McMahon (rugby union) (1889–c. 1961), Australian rugby union player
- Mike McMahon (disambiguation), multiple people
  - Brent McMahon (wheelchair racer) (Michael Brent McMahon, born 1966), Canadian Paralympic athlete
  - Michael MacMahon (politician) (1854–1931), Australian politician
  - Michael Peter MacMahon (1720–1807), Irish Dominican friar
  - Michael McMahon (born 1957), American politician and attorney
  - Michael McMahon (rugby union) (1889–c. 1961), Australian rugby union player
  - Michael McMahon (Scottish politician) (born 1961), Scottish politician
  - Mike McMahon (American football) (born 1979), American football player
  - Mike McMahon (Australian rules footballer) (1902–1962), Australian rules footballer
  - Mike McMahon (comics) (born 1954), British comics illustrator
  - Mike McMahon (professor), English surgeon
  - Mike McMahon Sr. (1915–1974), Canadian ice hockey player
  - Mike McMahon Jr. (1941–2013), his son, Canadian ice hockey player
- Noel McMahon QSM (1916–2013), New Zealand cricketer
- Owen McMahon (born 1970), Australian Olympic sailor
- P. J. McMahon (American football) (1877–1913), American former college football player, coach, and dentist
- Paddy McMahon (equestrian) (1933–2021), British show jumping champion
- Paddy McMahon (hurler) (1911–1987), Irish hurler
- Pádraig McMahon (born 1984), Gaelic footballer
- Pat McMahon (rugby league) (1927–2013), also known by the nickname of "Cocky", Australian professional rugby league footballer
- Pat McMahon (athlete) (born 1942), Irish former long-distance runner who competed in the marathon at the 1968 Summer Olympics
- Pat McMahon (footballer, born 1945) (born 1945), Scottish former footballer
- Pat McMahon (coach) (born 1953), American baseball coach
- Pat McMahon (soccer, born 1986), American soccer player
- Paul McMahon (born 1983), English cricketer
- Pete McMahon (born 1981), American football player
- Peter McMahon (equestrian) (born 1981), Australian equestrian
- Phil McMahon (born 1960), New Zealand cricketer
- Philip McMahon (1896–1997), Dublin Gaelic footballer
- Philly McMahon (born 1987), Gaelic footballer and saxophonist
- Ralph McMahon, alias of Ralph Horween, American football player for Harvard Crimson
- Ron McMahon (1927–2016), Australian rules footballer
- Ronn McMahon (born 1965), Canadian former basketball player
- Ronnie McMahon (1942–2010), Irish equestrian
- Rosemary McMahon, Hong Kong lawn bowler
- Ross McMahon, footballer
- Ryan McMahon, (born 1994), Major League Baseball infielder
- Sadie McMahon (1867–1964), Major League Baseball pitcher
- Sam McMahon (born 1976), English footballer
- Sandy McMahon (1870–1916), Scottish footballer
- Sean McMahon (born 1994), Australian rugby union player
- Seánie McMahon, Clare hurler
- Sharelle McMahon (born 1977), Australian netball player
- Sophie MacMahon (born 1997), Irish cricketer
- Steve McMahon (born 1961), English footballer
- Steve McMahon (footballer, born 1984), English footballer
- Sycerika McMahon (born 1995), Irish swimmer
- Tasmin McMahon (born 1993), Australian long-distance runner
- Tom McMahon (American football) (born 1969), American football coach
  - Emmett "Mitt" McMahon, jis son, online producer of The Pat McAfee Show
- Tom McMahon (footballer, born 1918) (1918–2005), Australian rules footballer
- Tony McMahon, English footballer
- Trevor McMahon (1929–2026), New Zealand Test cricketer
- Vincent McMahon (cricketer) (1918–1988), Australian cricketer
- Wade McMahon (born 1985), Australian Paralympic athlete

== Wrestling ==
- John McMahon (wrestler) (1841–1911), American professional wrestler; no relation to the McMahon family

The McMahon family of WWE fame:

- Jess McMahon (1882–1954), boxing and wrestling promoter; founder of Capitol Wrestling Corporation
- Vincent J. McMahon (1914–1984), wrestling promoter; founder of WWE's immediate predecessor company, the World Wide Wrestling Federation
- Vince McMahon (born 1945), former chairman and CEO of World Wrestling Entertainment, Inc. (dba WWE, Inc.)
- Linda McMahon (born 1948), wife of Vince Jr., former CEO of WWE and former administrator of the Small Business Administration.
- Shane McMahon (born 1970), son of Vince Jr. and former Executive President of WWE Global Media
- Stephanie McMahon (born 1976), daughter of Vince Jr., chairwoman and co-CEO of WWE

== Other occupations ==
- Barney McMahon DSM (1928–2010), Irish Defence Forces officer
- Benjamin McMahon (1818–1838), Irish emigrant who was an overseer on a Jamaica slave plantation, wrote an account of his experiences, and later became an avowed abolitionist
- Bernard F. McMahon, United States Navy submarine commander of World War II
- Brigadier Brian McMahon (New Zealand Army officer) CBE KStJ (born 1929), retired New Zealand Defence Force officer and former venereologist
- Brian McMahon, former CEO and GM of MapQuest
- Bryan MacMahon (judge) (born 1941), Irish judge
- Claire McMahon, who witnessed the kidnapping of her boyfriend Eric Dale
- Danielle McMahon, housemate on Big Brother (British series 15)
- Éamon McMahon, associate of Patrick Mackin, who was murdered due to a personal feud with Dominic McGlinchey
- Eugene McMahon, with his wife, Julia McMahon, owned two funeral homes and subsequently became the subject of Shearson/American Express Inc. v. McMahon, a US Supreme Court case and decision concerning arbitration of private securities fraud claims arising under the Securities Exchange Act of 1934
- F. P. McMahon, Supply Officer, Antarctic Division, Melbourne, and second-in-command of the Australian National Antarctic Research Expeditions (ANARE) (Thala Dan), 1960–61, after whom the McMahon Islands are named
- George McMahon (1950–2019), American cannabis rights activist
- Joey McMahon, founder of The Monday Life
- John McMahon, American settler, manager of the Courtland branch of the Huntsville mercantile firm Bierne and McMahon, and original documented owner of, as well as namesake of, the historic John McMahon House (built 1828)
- John E. McMahon (1860–1920), a United States Army officer who served in numerous conflicts, most notably in World War I, where he commanded the 5th Division, and father of John E. McMahon Jr.
- John E. McMahon Jr. (1890–1971), a career United States Army officer who attained the rank of brigadier general
- Johnny McMahon (comedian), Irish comedian and podcast host
- Julia McMahon, with her husband, Eugene McMahon, owned two funeral homes and subsequently became the subject of Shearson/American Express Inc. v. McMahon, a US Supreme Court case and decision concerning arbitration of private securities fraud claims arising under the Securities Exchange Act of 1934
- Julian McMahon (barrister) AC, Melbourne barrister who has been the lawyer for Van Tuong Nguyen and members of the Bali Nine
- J. Kevin McMahon, president and CEO of the Pittsburgh Cultural Trust
- Louise Davis McMahon (1873–1966), American philanthropist
- Michael McMahon, namesake of McMahons Point, Australia, as an Irish farm labourer who immigrated to the area with his brother, James McMahon, on 14 February 1848 when Michael was 19 years old
- Michael McMahon, former NYPD police officer and husband of Emmy award-winning American actress, singer and television writer Martha Byrne
  - Michael Terrence McMahon (born 1998), their eldest child
  - Maxwell Vincent McMahon (born 2002), their second child, the pregnancy and birth of whom was chronicled by an episode of the TLC series A Baby Story
  - Annmarie McMahon (born 2006), their third child
- Norman McMahon (1866–1914), British Army general
- Olivia McMahon, contestant and winner of season 3 of The Great Australian Bake Off
- Robert Carrier McMahon, OBE, (1923–2006), American chef, restaurateur, and cookery writer
- Robert "Frenchy" McMahon, criminal, featured in reporter Nicholas Pileggi’s nonfiction book Wiseguy, which is the basis for the 1990 Academy Award–winning film Goodfellas directed by Martin Scorsese
- Ryan McMahon, former girlfriend of, and noted domestic abuse victim of, American career criminal and former Boston Red Sox employee Jared Remy, who was also implicated in steroid distribution
- Thomas John McMahon FRGS (1864–1933), Australian photojournalist and writer who, from 1915 to 1922, made several trips to Melanesia and Micronesia to create work that answered a demand in Australia, and the Western World, for visual information on the life in the Pacific Islands, the local's physical appearance and customs, and whether economic opportunities existed for settlers or investors
- Will McMahon, host of syndicated Australian radio show Will & Woody

== Fictional characters ==
- Ben McMahon (played by Todd Lasance), the lead character in the Australian television drama series Crownies
- Buzz McMahon, a S.H.I.E.L.D. agent and supporting character in ongoing American comic book series Nick Fury's Howling Commandos, published by Marvel Comics
- Daniel "Danny" McMahon (played by Giovanni Ribisi), a central character in the film The Other Sister
- Dirk McMahon (voiced by Vince McMahon), a strip club owner in American adult animated superhero comedy television series Stan Lee’s Stripperella
- Elena McMahon (played by Anne Hathaway), the lead character in the 2020 political thriller film The Last Thing He Wanted (film) and the 1996 book on which it is based, The Last Thing He Wanted
  - Cat McMahon (played by Onata Aprile), Elena's daughter
  - Dick McMahon (played by Willem Dafoe), Elena's father
- General Glen McMahon (played by Brad Pitt), a thinly veiled version of U.S. Army General Stanley A. McChrystal in the 2017 film War Machine
- Henry McMahon, a major character in the 1997 book Term Limits by Vince Flynn
- Lieutenant Herb 'Mac' McMahon (played by Joe Morton), a character in the 1994 American action film Speed (1994 film) and, as an uncredited cameo, in its sequel Speed 2: Cruise Control
  - Mrs. McMahon (played by Neisha Folkes-LeMelle), though only in Speed (1994 film)
- Jimmy McMahon (Colm Meaney) and his brother John Joe McMahon (Bernard Hill), main characters in the 2003 Irish comedy/drama film The Boys from County Clare
- Matthew McMahon, a member of Garden, a senior assassin, of Spy x Family.
- Mrs. McMahon (first name unknown?) (played by Maggie Riley), in children's television series Grange Hill
- WPC Rachel McMahon, in The Missing Postman
- Shannon McMahon (played by Lucy Lawless), a lead character in "Nothing Important Happened Today", the two premiere episodes of the ninth season of the science fiction television series The X-Files
- Sheriff McMahon (first name unknown?) (played by Joe Morton), a lead character in the 1987 American science fiction horror film Stranded (1987 film)

== See also ==
- McMahon clans, ancestral Irish clans
- McMahon (disambiguation), disambiguation page for McMahon
- McMahan, surname list
- McMahen, surname list
- McMann, surname list
- Pre-Norman invasion Irish Celtic kinship groups, from whom many of the modern Irish surnames come
