= Mike McMahon =

Michael McMahon, Mike McMahon or Michael MacMahon may refer to:

- Brent McMahon (wheelchair racer) (Michael Brent McMahon, born 1966), Canadian Paralympic athlete
- Michael MacMahon (politician) (1854–1931), Australian politician
- Michael Peter MacMahon (1720–1807), Irish Dominican friar
- Michael McMahon (born 1957), American politician and attorney
- Michael McMahon (rugby union) (1889–c. 1961), Australian rugby union player
- Michael McMahon (Scottish politician) (born 1961), Scottish politician
- Mike McMahon (American football) (born 1979), American football player
- Mike McMahon (Australian rules footballer) (1902–1962), Australian rules footballer
- Mike McMahon (comics) (born 1954), British comics illustrator
- Mike McMahon (professor), English surgeon
- Mike McMahon Sr. (1915–1974), Canadian ice hockey player
- Mike McMahon Jr. (1941–2013), his son, Canadian ice hockey player

== See also ==
- Mike McMahan, American writer and producer
