= McMahon baronets of Ashley Manor (1817) =

Escutcheon of the McMahon baronets of Ashley Manor

The McMahon baronetcy, of Ashley Manor, was created in the Baronetage of the United Kingdom on 7 August 1817 for John McMahon, Member of Parliament for Aldeburgh from 1802 to 1812 and Private Secretary to George IV from 1811 to 1817. He was the brother of William MacMahon, 1st Baronet of the 1815 creation.

McMahon was succeeded according to a special remainder by his second brother Thomas. The 2nd baronet was a general in the army and served as commander-in-chief of the forces at Bombay.

== McMahon baronets, of Ashley Manor (1817) ==
- Sir John McMahon, 1st Baronet (died 1817)
- Sir Thomas McMahon, 2nd Baronet (1779–1860)
- Sir Thomas Westropp McMahon, 3rd Baronet (1814–1892)
- Sir Aubrey Hope McMahon, 4th Baronet (1862–1893)
- Sir Horace Westropp McMahon, 5th Baronet (1863–1932)
- Lt.-Col. Sir Eyre McMahon, OBE, 6th Baronet (1860–1935)
- Sir (William) Patrick McMahon, 7th Baronet (1900–1977)
- Sir Brian Patrick McMahon, 8th Baronet (1942–2018)
- Sir Patrick John Westropp McMahon, 9th Baronet (born 1988)

The heir presumptive is the present holder's brother Charles Beresford McMahon (born 1989).

== Notes ==
Baronetage of the United Kingdom
Preceded by Cameron baronets	Cameron baronets of Fassiefern; 17 August 1817	Succeeded by Campbell baronets
