= General McMahon =

General McMahon could refer to:

- John E. McMahon (1860–1920), U.S. Army major general
- Norman McMahon (1866-1914), British Army general
- Robert H. McMahon (fl. 2010s), U.S. Air Force major general
- Sir Thomas McMahon, 2nd Baronet (1779–1860), British Army lieutenant general
- Sir Thomas Westropp McMahon, 3rd Baronet (1813–1892), British Army general

== See also ==
- Hugh MacMahon (Indian Army officer) (1880–1939), British Indian Army major general
- Patrice de MacMahon (1808–1893), French general and politician
