= Kevin McMahon =

Kevin McMahon may refer to:

- Kevin McMahon (athlete) (born 1972), American retired track and field athlete
- Kevin McMahon (footballer, born 1946), English former footballer
- Kevin McMahon (Australian footballer) (1930–2022), Australian rules footballer
- Kevin McMahon (Gaelic footballer) (born 1982), Irish Gaelic footballer
- Kevin McMahon (musician) (born 1953), American musician, singer, and songwriter
- Kevin McMahon (rower) (born 1938), Australian Olympic rower
- Kevin R. McMahon (born 1962), American conductor and composer
- J. Kevin McMahon, president and CEO of the Pittsburgh Cultural Trust
