= Jennifer McMahon =

Jennifer McMahon may refer to:

- Jennifer McMahon (swimmer) in Aquatics at the 1990 Commonwealth Games
- Jennifer McMahon (writer) (born 1968), American novelist
- Jennifer McMahon, a character in the TV series Colony
- Jennifer A. McMahon (1956–2023), Australian philosopher
- Jenny McMahon (born 1957), New Zealand nurse and nutritionist

== See also ==
- Jenna McMahon, American writer, producer, actress and comedian
