= Don S. McMahon =

Australian medical doctor

Don S. McMahon is a retired Seventh-day Adventist medical doctor from Australia. Between 1971 and 1978 he lectured at Melbourne University where he assisted Professor Graeme Clark in the development of the Cochlear Implant (or Bionic Ear). He continued as a visiting lecturer while working as an ear, nose and throat surgeon for the rest of his career. He has been published in the medical textbook “Medicine and Surgery for Lawyers” and served on state medical panels associated with the Victorian Law Courts. Other books he has published are “Eucalypts for Enthusiasts”, “The Good News of Revelation” and “Historic and Significant Bridges of Australia”. He also served on a surgical team during the Vietnam War.

After retiring, he spent time researching and writing about Ellen G. White and issues related to her health message and claims of visions from God contributing to her health advice. In 2005 he published his analysis in "Acquired or Inspired." In it, he compares Ellen White to other health authors of her era and compares their accuracy according to his understanding of evidence-based medicine of 2000 C.E. The authors that Dr. McMahon used in his study include Sylvester Graham, Dr. William Alcott, Dr. Larkin B Coles, James Caleb Jackson and Dr. John Harvey Kellogg. Also in 2005, Dr. McMahon co-authored "The Prophet and Her Critics" with Leonard Brand. He also served as a lecturer at Avondale College in Australia.

Dr. Graeme S. Bradford, an Adventist scholar and author of another highly acclaimed book about Ellen White, has said of Dr McMahon's book, "Don McMahon has done the Church a wonderful service through this research. If the reader will carefully examine his arguments they will find he has developed one of the most powerful arguments that can be presented for the inspiration of Ellen White. When people read this book they will be pondering the question 'how could a relatively uneducated woman living in the 19th century be so right at a time when her more educated contemporaries were so wrong?"

Ronald L. Numbers, who describes himself as agnostic, stated "Despite their pretense to scientific rigor, McMahon's books are riddled with pseudoscientific claims, historical errors, and misleading comparisons."
