= McMahon clans =

Gaelic Irish clans

McMahon, also spelt MacMahon (Irish: Mac Mathúna, traditionally Mac Mathghamhna), were different Middle Age era Irish clans. Their name is derived from the Gaelic Mac Mathghamhna meaning 'son of the bear'. According to historian C. Thomas Cairney, the MacMahons were one of the chiefly families of the Dal gCais or Dalcassians who were a tribe of the Erainn who were the second wave of Celts to settle in Ireland between about 500 and 100 BC. The same historian stated that another group of McMahons were a chiefly family of the Oirghialla or Airgíalla tribe who were in turn from the Laigin tribe who were the third wave of Celts to settle in Ireland during the first century BC.

== The MacMahons of Thomond (County Clare) ==
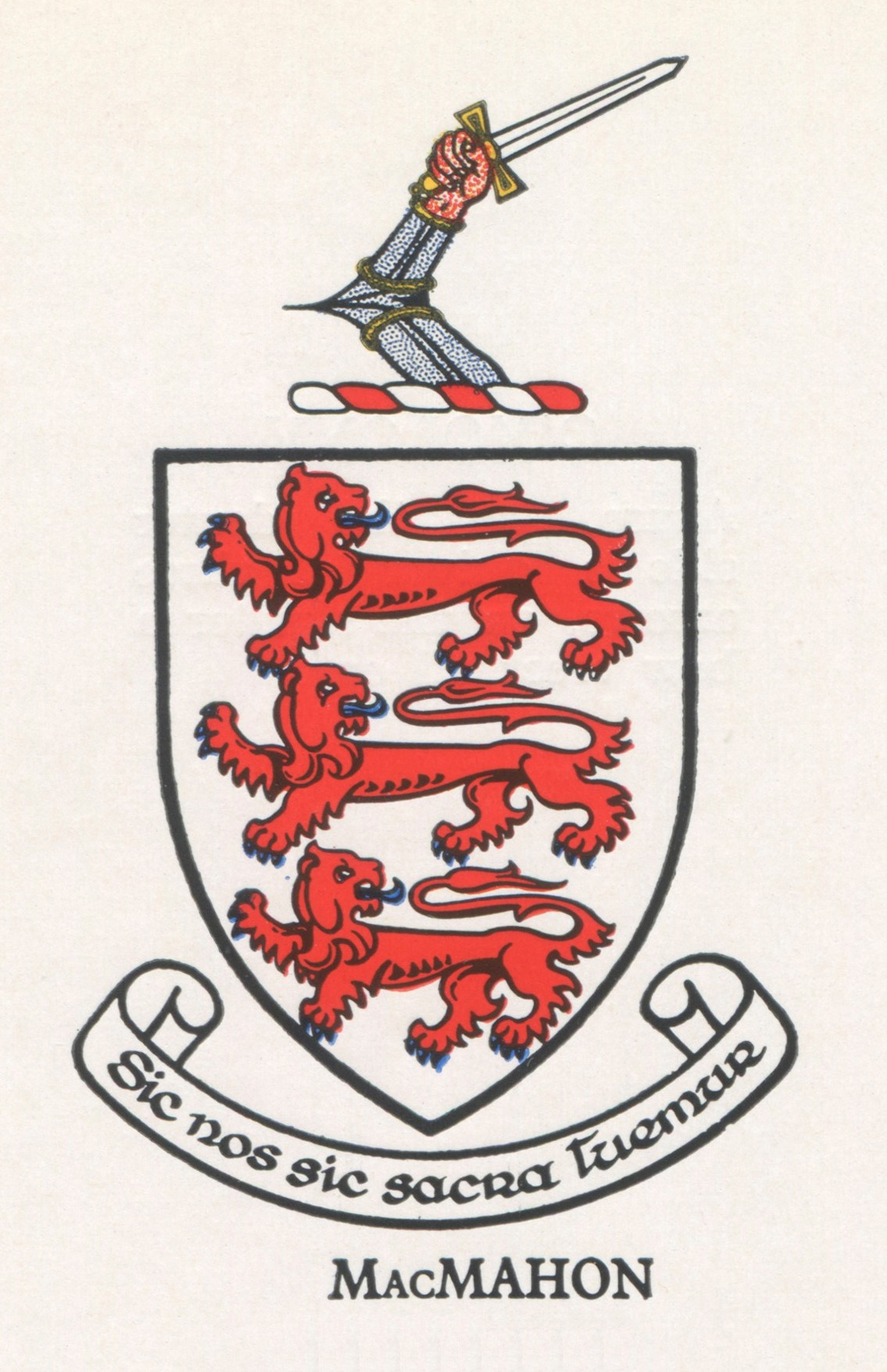
Coat of Arms for the MacMahons of Thomond

The Thomond MacMahons were part of the great tribal grouping, the Dál gCais, and claimed descent from Mahon O'Brien, son of Muirchertach Ua Briain, High King of Ireland. Corcu Baiscin was held by the descendants of Carbry Bascain until the 11th century, when the descendants of Mahon O’Brien conquered them.

According to Frost, Mahone 'a quo MacMahon' died in 1129, leaving two sons Murtagh and Dermot, with Murtagh being the ancestor of the main line of McMahons in Clare. The McMahons seized the Corcabaskin territory in the south of what is now County Clare in the 12th century about the same time as they adopted the fixed surname.

Quoting the "Annals of the Four Masters", Frost says that Donogh MacMahon, Lord of Corcabaskin, died in 1488 and two MacMahons, Brian and Teige Roe, were established in his place – Brian in West Corcabaskin (known as Moyarta) and Teige Roe in the East (known as Clonderalaw). The two ruling branches of the clan became firmly established in Corcabaskin, West Clare, where their once strongholds, Carrigaholt Castle and Clonderlaw Castle, are prominent landmarks and a source of local interest today.

In August 1585, the Irish leaders of Thomond were forced to sign an Indenture with Sir John Perrott, the English Lord Deputy of Ireland. Frost says that "some of the signatories of the Deed of Composition seem to have been bribed into conformity by Perrott", including Teige MacMahon ... of Clonderalaw and Turlough MacMahon of Moyarta. They were allowed to retain their castles and lands free of crown rent. The two MacMahons would have received the English titles of Baronet, replacing their traditional Irish titles, about this time. The two sons who succeeded them as heads of their families certainly each carried the English title.

The last chief of the West Corcabaskin MacMahons, Sir Teige Caech MacMahon, was killed at or shortly after the battle of Kinsale in 1602, and his title became extinct.

Sir Turlough Roe MacMahon, Baronet of East Corcabaskin, received the honour of becoming High Sheriff of County Clare in 1609. He died in 1629. According to an Inquisition held at Ennis in 1630 (reported in Frost's "History ... of Clare"), Turlough's title was inherited by his eldest son, Sir Teige MacMahon. Sir Teige (or Teague) represented the Earl of Thomond in negotiations with Sir William Penn in 1646, but in 1651 General Ireton seized Clonderlaw Castle from Sir Teige. Frost's "History" records 31 Townlands in County Clare being seized from Sir Teague. James Barry's "The Cromwellian Settlement of the County of Limerick" mentions Sir Teague MacMahon as the holder of other lands in that County.

There is evidence that Sir Teague had a son called Turlough (or Terlagh). Honour, Lady Dowager of Kerry and Lixnaw, was granted the "guardianship and tuition of Torlogh MacMahon, son and heir to Teague MacMahon" on 27 June 1673 (recorded in MS Carte 38, fol(s) 742v (Carte Calendar Vol 52, 1673–1674, Bodleian Library, Uni of Oxford). Ainsworth's edited Inchiquin Manuscripts, MS No 1845, at p. 625, contains a note made following the death of Mary Rua O'Brien in 1686 which refers to "her nephew Sir Terlagh McMahon". The title appears to have died out with him.

After the defeats of the native Irish in the 17th century, many of the Clare MacMahons emigrated to serve in the Irish Brigade of the French Army.

Patrice de MacMahon (1808–1893), was created Duke of Magenta, appointed Marshal of France, and later the President of France. The MacMahon family are still prominent in France; the family home is the Château de Sully outside Dijon.

=== Motto ===
The motto of the Thomond sept of McMahons is "Sic Nos Sic Sacra Tuemur", which means "Thus We Defend Our Sacred Rights” being Protectors of Church properties owned by the Kings of Thomond being the O'Brien Clan. The McMahon Clan is directly descended from legendary General and High King of Ireland Brian Boru "Conquorer of the Danes at Clontarf". As are the O'Briens, who the McMahons have fought and married for 1,000 years.

== The MacMahons of Oriel (County Monaghan) ==
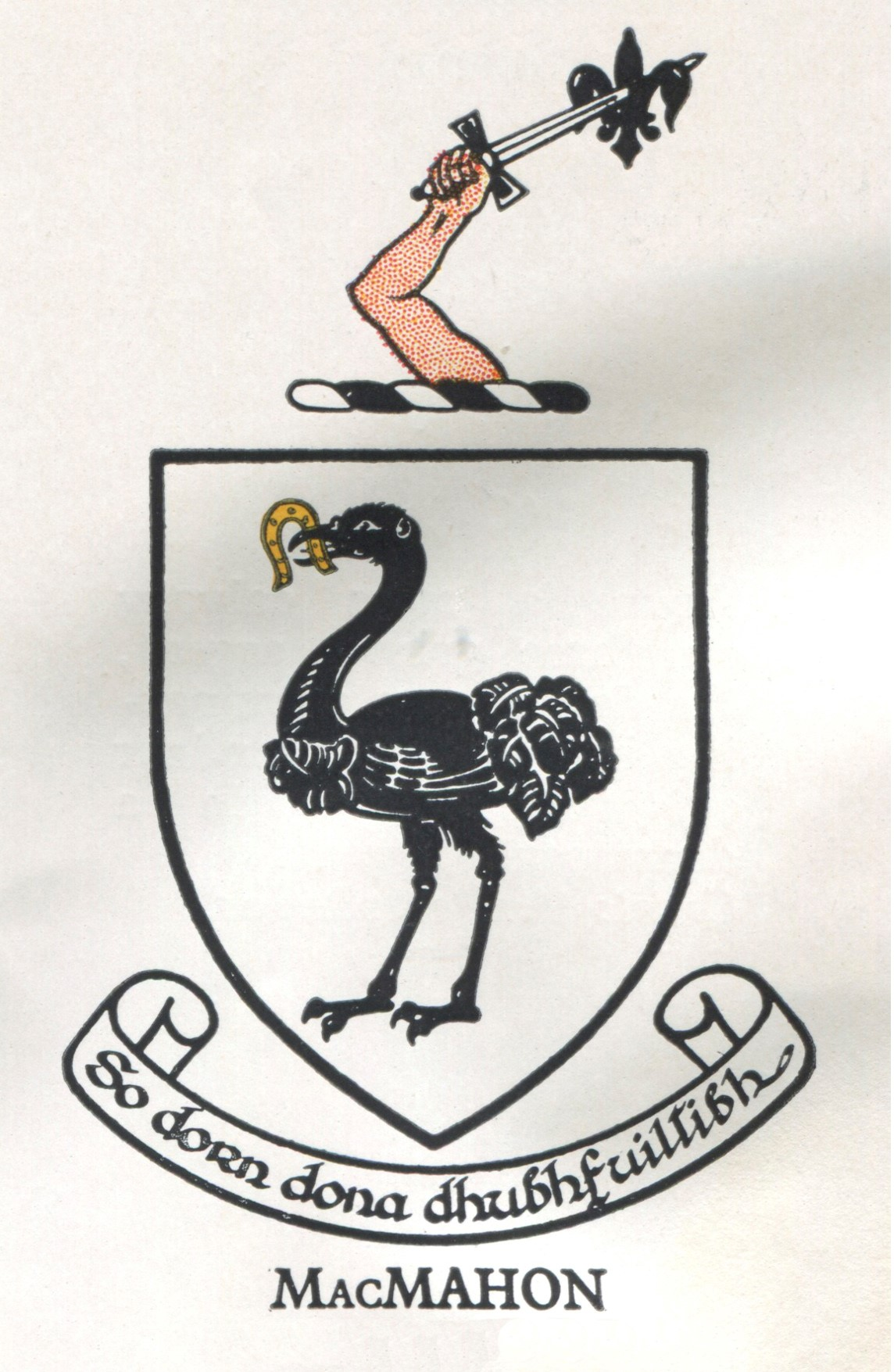
Coat of Arms of the MacMahons of Oriel

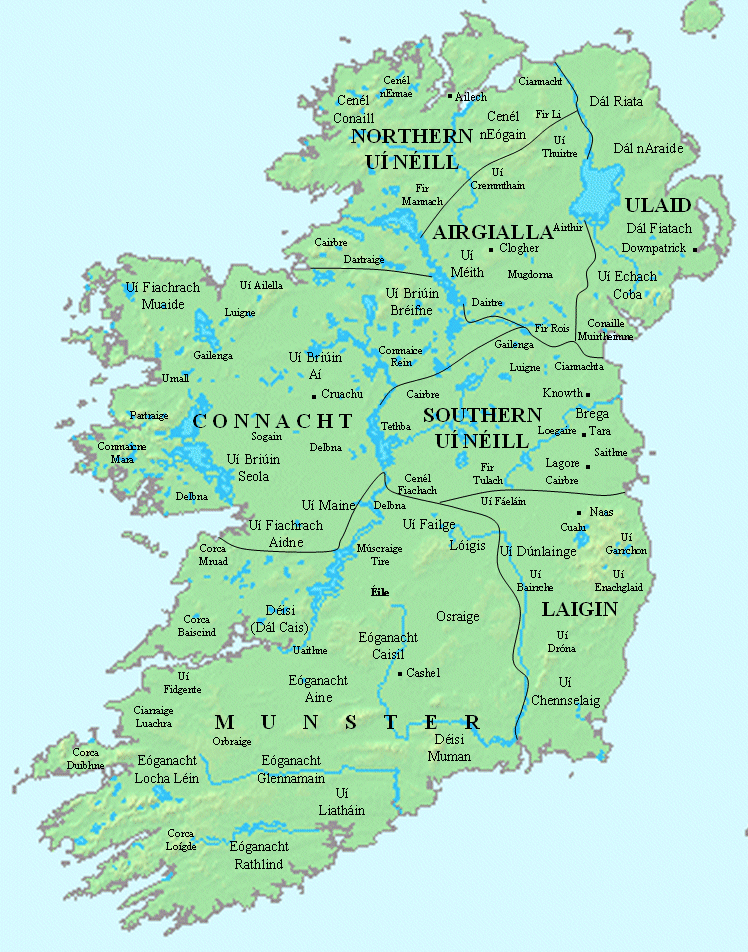
Early peoples in Ireland and the seven provinces as defined in the 11th-century Lebor na Cert (Book of Rights)

=== Motto ===
In the old Irish orthography, the Oriel MacMahon motto is "So Dorn Dona Dhubhfuillibh" and "So Dorn Dona Dhubhfuiltish" in reformed. The motto was originally a battle cry and roughly translates to "Here's a fist to the dark-blooded","This hand is raised against tyrants","Beware of retaliatory blows" or "Guard against counterblows".

=== History ===
The MacMahons of Oriel are a sept, or sub-clan, of Clann Nadsluaigh. They trace descent from The Three Collas to their patronymic namesake, Niall Mac Mathghamhna, who descended from Mathgamna, Lord of the ancient kingdom of Fernmaige, located in the modern Baroney of Farney. They ruled the kingdom of Oriel (Anglicisation of Airgíalla) from 1243 to 1590 C.E. The Airgíalla Kingship was ended when Rossa Buidhe MacMahon, found himself in a geopolitically untenable position of his kingdom wedged between an expanding Tudor Kingdom of Ireland and Tír Eoghain under the O'Neill. Rossa Buidhe agreed to surrender and regrant his territories to the English Crown in Ireland and they became County Monaghan in the Kingdom of Ireland. The county was subdivided into five baronies with Farney, Cremorne, Dartrey, and Monaghan controlled by MacMahons and Truagh by McKennas.

The MacMahons lost control of Monaghan after the Irish Rebellion of 1641. Led by Colla Mac O'brian MacMahon, the MacMahons rose in revolt with O'Neill and other Ulster clans in an attempt to seize Dublin Castle and overthrow the English Tudor kingdom. While the plot to capture Dublin Castle failed, the McMahons captured Castleblaney and Carrickmacross in Monaghan. However, the English defeated the Irish uprising and Monaghan land was passed to Protestant settlers.

It was a MacMahon, Colonel Hugh Oge's loose lips, that were responsible for letting slip the plot to seize Dublin Castle. He had drunkenly told his Protestant foster brother Owen Connolly, who subsequently betrayed him and he was captured. With the help of two priests and a Scottish maid, Hugh Oge escaped from the Tower of London by sawing through his bars on 18 August 1644. However, he was recaptured 5 weeks later. He was convicted of treason and beheaded in London on 22 November 1644.

John O'Hart also noted that the early MacMahons (sometimes called O'Mahons) were chiefs of the over-kingdom of Ulaid, which bordered Airgíalla.

=== Chieftains ===
- Neill mac Mathgamhna mac Mathgamna ?-? (Ladrannaibh, or the bandit), (early 12th century)
- Eochaid mac Mathgahamna mac Neill, died 1273
- Brian mac Eochada, 1283–1311
- Ralph/Roolb mac Eochada, 1311–1314
- Mael Sechlainn mac Eochada, 1314–?
- Murchad Mór mac Briain, ?–1331
- Seoan mac Maoilsheachlainn, 1331–1342
- Aodh mac Roolb, 1342–1344
- Murchadh Óg mac Murchada, 1344–1344
- Maghnus mac Eochadha, 1344–1357
- Pilib mac Rooilbh, 1357–1362
- Brian Mór mac Aodh, 1362–1365
- Niall mac Murchadha, 1365–1368
- Brian Mór mac Aodh, 1368–1371
- Pilib Ruadh mac Briain, 1371–1403
- Ardghal mac Briain, 1403–February 1416
- Brian mac Ardghail, 1416–1442
- Ruaidhri mac Ardghail, 1442–1446
- Aodh Ruadh mac Ruaidhri, 1446–31 March 1453
- Feidhlimidh mac Briain, 1453–1466
- Eochan mac Ruaidhri, 1466–1467
- Reamonn mac Ruaidhri, 1467–November 1484
- Aodh Óg mac Aodha Ruaidh, 1485–16 September 1496
- Brian mac Reamoinn, 1496–1497
- Rossa mac Maghnusa, 1497–1513
- Reamonn mac Glaisne, 1513–c.1 April 1521
- Glaisne Óg mac Reamoinn, 1521–1551?
- Art Maol mac Reamoinn, 1551–1560
- Aodh mac Briain, 1560–1562
- Art Ruadh mac Briain, 1562–1578
- Sir Rossa Buidhe mac Airt, 1579–August 1589
- Hugh Roe McMahon (Irish: Aodh Ruadh mac Airt), 1589–September/October 1590.
- Brian Mac Hugh Og of the Dartrey MacMahons (late 16th century)

Sourced from:

- MacMahons of Oriel: Mac Mathghamna, Kings of Oirghialla to 1590, in A New History of Ireland, pp. 215–16, volume IX, ed. Byrne, Martin, Moody. Dublin, 1984
- (II) The "Airgialla Charter Poem", Ailbhe Mac Shamhrain and Paul Byrne, in The Kingship and Landscape of Tara, Edel Bhreathnach, pp. 213–224, edited Edel Bhreathnach, Four Courts Press, Dublin, 2005

==== Branch chieftains ====
- Raymond McMahon of the Killyleen Mc Mahons (late 17th century)
- Nicholas McMahon of the Cluaincoinin Mc Mahons (early 19th century)
- Patrick McMahon of the Cluaincoinin Mc Mahons (late 19th century)
- Martin McMahon [Motto] of the Cluaincoinin Mc Mahons (early 20th century)
- John McMahon [Jack Martin] of the Cluaincoinin Mc Mahons (late 20th century)

== The McMahons of Fermanagh ==
A separate McMahon family in County Fermanagh is descended from Mahon Maguire, a grandson of Donn Carrach Maguire.

== Ships of the surname ==
MV Empire MacMahon was an oil tanker converted by the British for World War II service as a merchant aircraft carrier or MAC ship, that is an escort carrier for anti-submarine warfare, an anti-submarine warfare carrier.

== See also ==
- McMahon (disambiguation)
- McMahon (surname)
- Irish clans
