= Ryan Mahon (disambiguation) =

Ryan Mahon may refer to:

- Ryan Mahon (musician), see As Friends Rust
- Ryan Mahon (jockey), see 2011 Grand National

== See also ==
- Ryan McMahon (disambiguation)
