= Norman McMahon =

British Army general (1866–1914)

Brigadier-General Norman McMahon
- Born: Norman Reginald McMahon; 24 January 1866; London, England
- Died: 11 November 1914 (aged 48); Near Hooge, Belgium
- Burial place: No known grave (commemorated on the Ploegsteert Memorial to the Missing)
- Military career
- Allegiance: United Kingdom
- Branch: British Army
- Service years: 1885–1914
- Rank: Brigadier-General
- Unit: Royal Fusiliers
- Commands: 4th Battalion, Royal Fusiliers
- Conflicts: Burma expedition (1886–87); Second Boer War (1899–1902); First World War (1914)

Brigadier-General Norman Reginald McMahon (24 January 1866 – 11 November 1914) was a British Army officer. He served with the Royal Fusiliers in the Burma expedition of 1886–87 and in the Second Boer War of 1899–1902. During the latter campaign he served on the general staff as an aide-de-camp and then brigade major. McMahon was seriously wounded in action and was subsequently mentioned in dispatches and awarded the Distinguished Service Order. Once recovered he served as Deputy Assistant Adjutant General towards the end of the war.

McMahon was appointed chief instructor of the army's School of Musketry in 1905 and sought to improve the infantry's rate of fire. His request for additional machine guns to be allocated to each battalion was rebuffed and he instead worked on increasing the rate of fire from the riflemen. He implemented rapid-fire training on the Lee–Enfield rifle with each soldier being expected to achieve 15 aimed shots within a minute. This later proved very effective during the opening stages of the First World War. McMahon was promoted to brigadier-general in the first months of the war and was due to take over command of the 10th Infantry Brigade shortly before he was killed by shell fire.

== Early life and career ==
Norman Reginald McMahon was born in London on 24 January 1866 and was the youngest son of General Sir Thomas Westropp McMahon, 3rd Baronet. McMahon attended Eton College and the Royal Military College Sandhurst from which he was commissioned as a subaltern, with the rank of lieutenant, in the Royal Fusiliers (City of London Regiment) on 23 May 1885. He served on the Burma expedition of 1886–87 and was appointed adjutant on 28 February 1890. He relinquished his appointment after two years and was promoted to captain on 27 November 1896.

McMahon served during the Second Boer War and on 9 October 1899 was seconded to the general staff for service as an aide-de-camp (ADC) to an infantry major-general. He was present at the 11 October Relief of Ladysmith and the 15 December Battle of Colenso. McMahon held the position of ADC until appointed as brigade major of the 6th Infantry Brigade on 29 April 1900. He served in operations in the Orange River Colony and was seriously wounded in action during operations in the Tugela Heights. He was mentioned in dispatches for his service by General Redvers Buller on 30 March 1900.

McMahon was invalided due to his injury and as a result his appointment as brigade major ended on 6 May 1900. He was awarded the Distinguished Service Order (DSO) on 29 November 1900 and was promoted to the rank of major on 28 November 1901. McMahon returned to service later in the war and held the appointment of deputy assistant adjutant general (DAAG) from February to June 1902.

== School of musketry ==
McMahon was appointed to the staff again in June 1905 when he was appointed chief instructor at the army's School of Musketry in Hythe, Kent. As chief instructor in 1907 he foresaw the future of warfare and recommended that each infantry battalion be allocated 6 machine guns. This recommendation was rejected and he instead instituted reforms of rifle training. Under McMahon all infantrymen were required to be able to fire 15 aimed shots in a minute, a practice that was enshrined in the Musketry Regulations of 1909. This became known as the "mad minute" and proved highly effective during the August 1914 Battle of Mons. It is said that German soldiers coming up against such rapid fire presumed that they were facing a battery of machine guns.

McMahon relinquished his appointment as chief instructor on 9 June 1909 and thereafter served at army headquarters until January 1910. He passed the staff officer's course at the Staff College, Camberley in December 1910 and was promoted to the rank of lieutenant colonel on 3 May 1911.

== First World War ==
After the outbreak of the First World War in August 1914 McMahon served with the Royal Fusiliers on the Western Front and was mentioned in dispatches on 8 October 1914 by Field Marshal Sir John French, commander-in-chief (C-in-C) of the British Expeditionary Force (BEF), for his actions during the First Battle of the Aisne. On 23 October he was appointed a 1st grade staff officer (GSO1) and on 5 November was promoted to the temporary rank of brigadier-general. It was intended that he command the 10th Infantry Brigade. At the request of General Sir Horace Smith-Dorrien, general officer commanding (GOC) II Corps of the BEF, McMahon was retained in command of a battalion of the Royal Fusiliers until a suitable replacement could be found. A replacement was found and McMahon was to take command of his brigade on 12 November.

On 11 November 1914 his battalion was fighting in the First Battle of Ypres. They were holding a position east of Hooge and just south of the main Ypres-Menin road. After a period of heavy shelling an attack by the 15th Battalion of the German Imperial Guard drove back McMahon's men, though a counter assault in conjunction with men of the Royal Scots Fusiliers and the Royal Sussex Regiment recovered the position. McMahon was rallying a group of recently arrived battalion support staff when he was hit in the leg. Whilst kneeling to attend to his injury a shell burst nearby, killing him.

McMahon has no known grave and is commemorated on the Ploegsteert Memorial to the Missing in Belgium. He was mentioned in dispatches again by Field Marshal French after his death, on 14 January 1915, for service during the Battle of Armentières. At the time of his death he was a member of the British Numismatic Society.

== See also ==
- List of generals of the British Empire who died during the First World War
