= Ryan McMahon (disambiguation) =

Ryan McMahon (born 1994) is an American baseball infielder.

Ryan McMahon may also refer to:

- Ryan McMahon (comedian) (born 1977), Anishinaabe comedian, podcaster, and writer
- Ryan McMahon (singer) (born 1979), Canadian singer-songwriter
- Iame (rapper) (Ryan McMahon, fl. 2010s), American hip-hop recording artist
- Ryan McMahon, member of the Irish band Inhaler
- Ryan McMahon, former member of the remix team Captain Cuts

== See also ==
- Ryan McMahen (born 1982), American soccer player
- Ryan Mahon (disambiguation)
