= McMahon Islands =

Islands in Enderby Land, Antarctica

- Location within Antarctica

Geography
- Location: Antarctica
- Coordinates: 67°38′40″S 45°58′30″E
- Highest elevation: 60 m (200 ft)

Administration
- Administered under the Antarctic Treaty System

Demographics
- Population: Uninhabited

McMahon Islands are two low, peaked, rocky islands, 0.9 kilometres (0.5 nmi) north of the Thala Hills, Enderby Land. The islands, about 60 m (197 ft) above sea level, are separated by a narrow channel. Plotted from Australian National Antarctic Research Expeditions (ANARE) air photos taken in 1956 and visited by the Australian National Antarctic Research Expeditions (ANARE) (Thala Dan) in February, 1961. Named by ANCA for F.P. McMahon, Supply Officer, Antarctic Division, Melbourne, and second-in-command of the Australian National Antarctic Research Expeditions (ANARE) (Thala Dan), 1960–61.

== See also ==
- Composite Antarctic Gazetteer
- List of Antarctic islands south of 60° S
- SCAR
- Territorial claims in Antarctica
