= Benjamin McMahon =

Benjamin McMahon (Irish: Binimín Mac Mathúna; active 1818–1838) was an Irish man of the 19th century. Emigrating to the British West Indies, he worked as an overseer on a Jamaica slave plantation, and wrote an account of his experiences.

== Early life ==
McMahon was born in Ireland. He moved to South America in 1818 to serve in Simón Bolívar's "British Legions". In 1819 he left and migrated to British Jamaica where he worked as a bookkeeper (foreman) and overseer. He lived there for eighteen years and worked on twenty-four different plantations.

He was unemployed for a period after criticising the treatment of slaves, and served in suppressing the Baptist War, a slave rebellion of 1831–32.

McMahon later became an avowed abolitionist, and wrote an account of his experiences, entitled Jamaica Plantership.
