= Larkin B. Coles =

American physician

Larkin Baker Coles
- Born: 1803; New Hampshire
- Died: 1856 (aged 52–53); Louisville, Kentucky
- Occupations: Physician, minister

Larkin Baker Coles (1803 – 1856) was an American medical doctor, minister, Millerite preacher, anti-tobacco activist and vegetarian.

== Biography ==
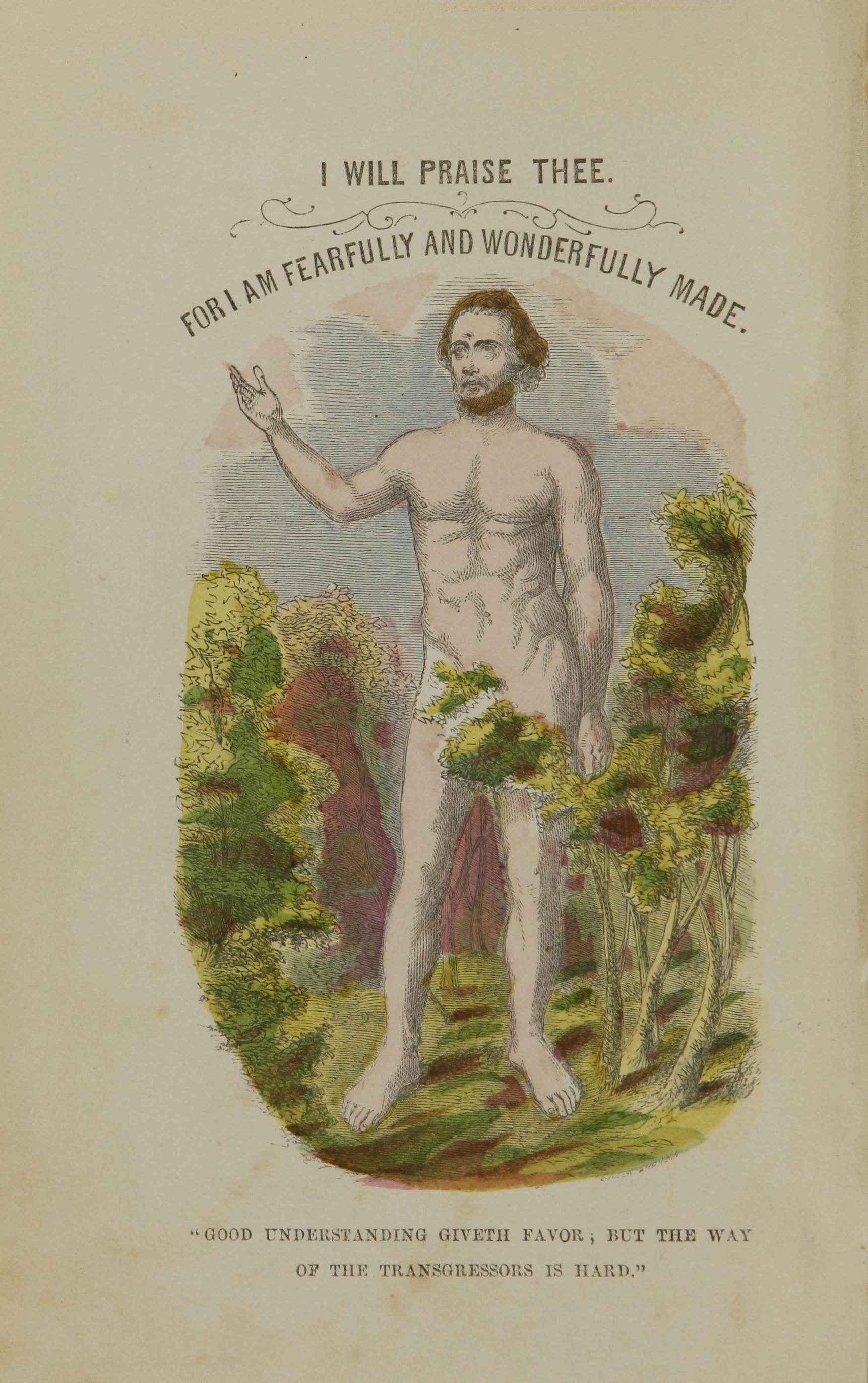
Front cover of Philosophy of Health, 1857 edition

Coles was born in New Hampshire. He graduated from Castleton Medical College in 1825. He trained as a minister and was associated with William Miller. Coles married Sarah Marshall Dyar on February 14, 1827. They had five children of whom two died in early youth. He resided in Boston in 1844 and joined the Boston Medical Society and the Massachusetts Medical Society.

Coles' best known work was Philosophy of Health, first published in 1848 which went through many editions. It had sold 35,000 copies during its first 5 years. The twenty-sixth edition appeared in 1851. The book espoused Christian health reform with arguments for exercise, fresh air, vegetarianism, non-use of stimulants, sexual purity and drugless medicine. Coles defended vegetarianism from a nutritional, physiological and religious basis.

Coles died in January 1856, whilst visiting Louisville, Kentucky.

== Anti-tobacco activism ==
Coles was an early crusader against tobacco. He authored The Beauties and Deformities of Tobacco-Using in 1853, which described tobacco as "a deadly narcotic".

== Influence on Ellen G. White ==
Coles's health views influenced Ellen G. White. White frequently lifted passages from Coles's work without attribution.

== Selected publications ==
- Philosophy of Health: Natural Principles of Health and Cure (1848, 1854)
- The Beauties and Deformities of Tobacco-Using (1853)
