= McMahon baronets of Dublin (1815) =

Extinct baronetcy

Escutcheon of the McMahon baronets of Dublin

The McMahon Baronetcy, of Dublin, was created in the Baronetage of the United Kingdom on 6 May 1815 for William MacMahon, who was Master of the Rolls in Ireland. The title became extinct on the death of the 4th Baronet in 1926.

== McMahon baronets, of Dublin (1815) ==
- Sir William MacMahon, 1st Baronet (1776–1837)
- Sir Beresford Burston McMahon, 2nd Baronet (1808–1873)
- Sir William Samuel McMahon, 3rd Baronet (1839–1905)
- Sir Lionel McMahon, 4th Baronet (1856–1926)

== Notes ==
Peerage of the United Kingdom
Preceded by Marjoribanks baronets	McMahon baronets of Dublin; 6 May 1815	Succeeded by Silvester baronets
