= The Monday Life =

U.S. non-profit organization

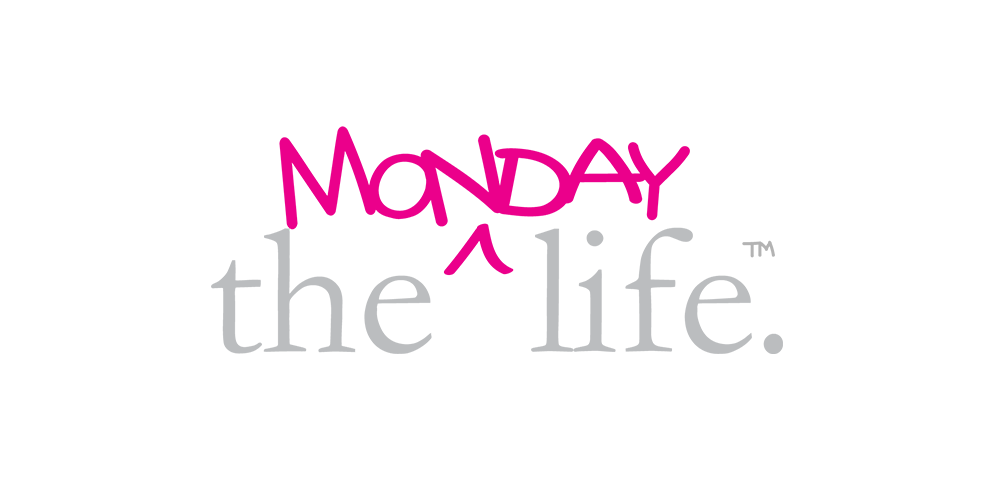
- Founded: 2011
- Founder: Joey McMahon
- Type: 501(c)(3) non-profit organization
- Location: Chapel Hill, North Carolina
- Website: themondaylife.org

The Monday Life is a 501(c)(3) national non-profit organization that works toward the welfare of hospitalized children by improving their patient environments. The organization has a crowd-sourced fundraising platform, in which donors can give $1 every Monday.

== History ==
Joey McMahon started The Monday Life after his grandfather died of bone cancer in 2009. McMahon had grown up volunteering at Duke Children's Hospital & Health Center and noticed that the hospital environment impacted healing outcomes.

The organization was launched in 2011 and initially worked with Duke Children's Hospital and Health Center. In 2012, The Monday Life began to partner with other hospitals. In 2013, The Monday Life was featured in a segment of Google's and Mashable's Giving Tuesday Hangout-a-thon. The organization has worked with the Duke Blue Devils men's basketball team, including filming a video with players and patients which was featured on both CBS and NBC Sports.

== Mission ==
The organization aims to help hospitalized children experience health, happiness, and hope through improved patient environments. The organization listens directly to nurses, child health professionals, and patients when funding projects. Requests from nurses have led the organization to support many ideas, including iPads, art supplies, a new playground, movie nights, djembe drums, and padding for beds. In 2015, The Monday Life brought an interactive 3D V-pod Sensory Unit, created by Amazing Interactives, to Brenner Children's Hospital.
