= Michael Peter MacMahon =

The Most Reverend Michael Peter MacMahon
- Bishop of Killaloe
- Archdiocese: Roman Catholic Archdiocese of Cashel and Emly
- Diocese: Roman Catholic Diocese of Killaloe
- Appointed: 4 August 1765
- Term ended: 16 October 1798
- Predecessor: William O'Meara
- Successor: James O'Shaughnessy

Orders
- Consecration: 4 August 1765 by Archbishop James Butler

Personal details
- Born: Michael Peter MacMahon; 1720 Limerick
- Died: 20 February 1807 (age 87)
- Denomination: Roman Catholic

Michael Peter MacMahon O.P.(1720–20 February 1807) was a Dominican friar and prelate of the Roman Catholic Church born in Limerick, Ireland. He served as Bishop of Killaloe approximately for 42.5 years from 1765 till when he died aged 87 in 1807. He was appointed Bishop on 5 June 1765 and was consecrated on 4 August later that year.

He is one of the longest serving bishop in the history of Diocese of Killaloe. Penal laws were relaxed during his episcopate and made life easier for Catholics. The pectoral cross worn by him is still worn by the Bishop Kieran O'Reilly of the Diocese.
