= Haze (band) =

English progressive rock band

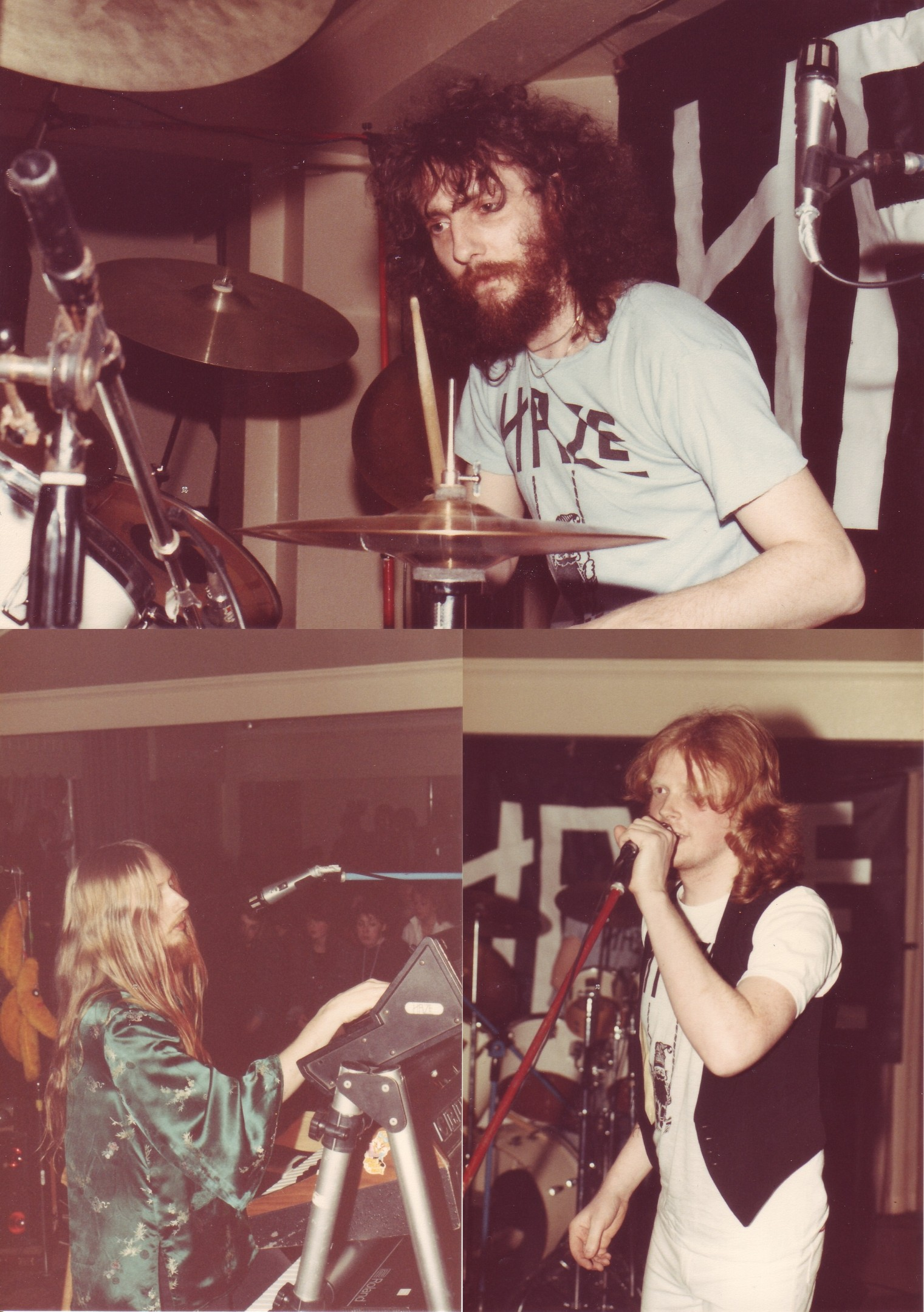
- The three members of Haze

Background information
- Origin: Sheffield, England
- Genre: Progressive rock
- Years active: 1978–1988; 1998–present
- Label: Gabadon
- Members: Chris McMahon; Paul McMahon; Danny McMahon; Catrin Ashton
- Past members: Paul Chisnell
- Website: www.gabadon.co.uk/haze.html

Haze are an English progressive rock band from Sheffield, mainly active in England in the 1980s.

== History ==
Formed in 1978 by the brothers Chris McMahon (bass, keyboards and vocals), and Paul McMahon (guitar and vocals), they played their first concert at Stephen Hill Youth Club, Sheffield on 10 November that year. They had several drummers before the longest serving and most notable, Paul 'Chis' Chisnell, joined them at a concert at the White Lion in Huddersfield, on 19 June 1983. The band's first full album, C'est La Vie, was released on vinyl with a special concert at Sheffield's The Leadmill on 7 April 1984.

On 29 May 1988, the band played a final sell-out gig at Sheffield University to celebrate their tenth anniversary of the band's founding before splitting up. However, on 31 May 1998, they reunited for a one-off concert to mark their 20th anniversary at The Boardwalk in Sheffield. They now play together on an occasional basis, and played two 30th anniversary gigs at The Peel, Kingston-upon-Thames, London on 31 May, and at The Boardwalk on 1 June 2008, at which six new songs were performed.

Despite achieving no chart success, and never having a recording contract (they released their own albums, on their 'Gabadon' label), they attracted a considerable cult following, headlined at The Marquee, and their original albums are highly sought-after collector's items.

In March 2013, the band released their first studio album in 26 years, called The Last Battle. The album features the band in its classic line-up (Paul McMahon, Chris McMahon, and Paul Chisnell) with the addition of Ceri Ashton (on whistle, flute, cello, viola and clarinet) and Catrin Ashton (on fiddle and flute). The band stated that this is the final recorded performance with their long time drummer Paul Chisnell. Since the release of the album, Paul McMahon's son, Danny McMahon, has been the drummer for the band.

== Images ==
All images are taken from a concert the band performed in the early 1980s.

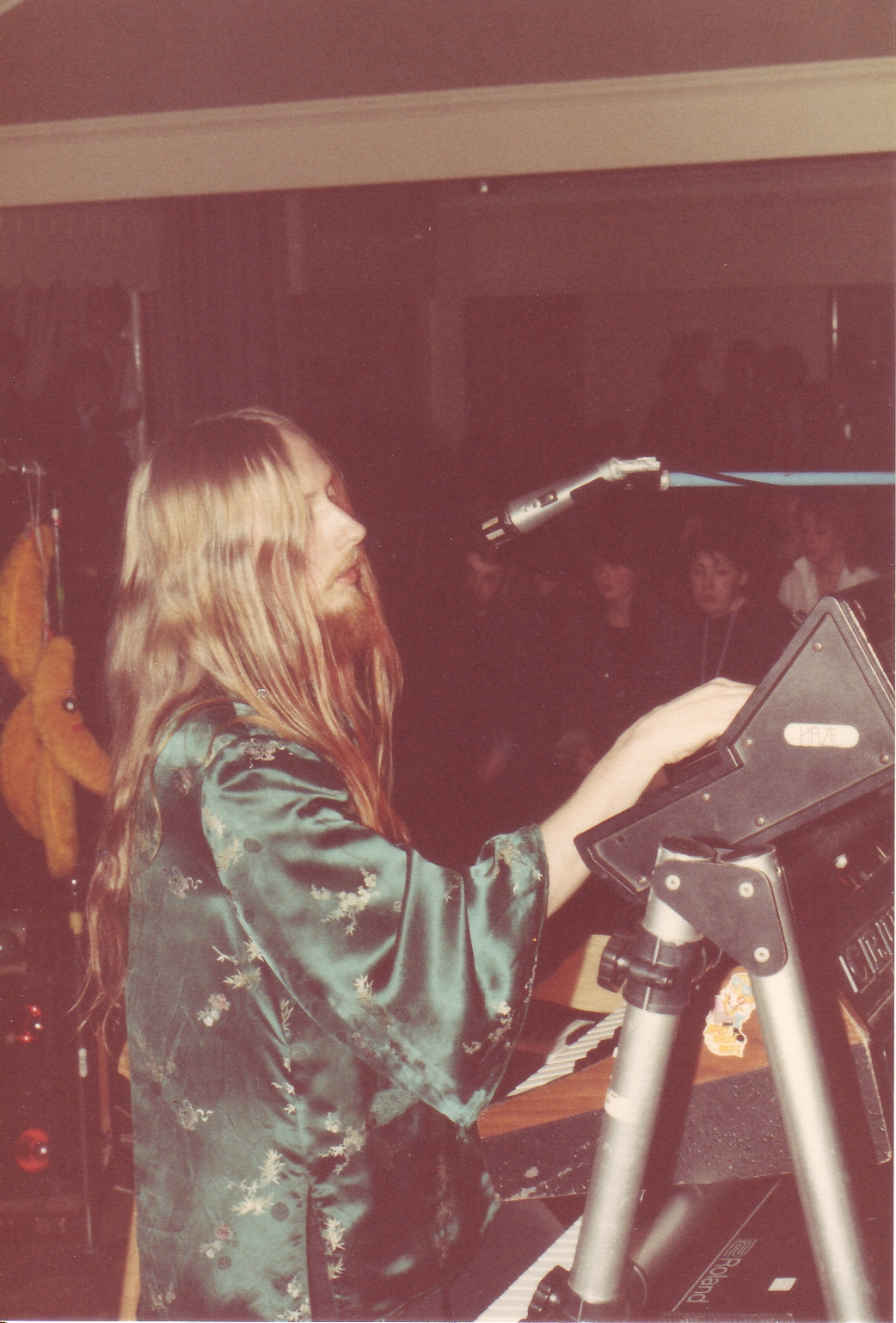
Chris McMahon

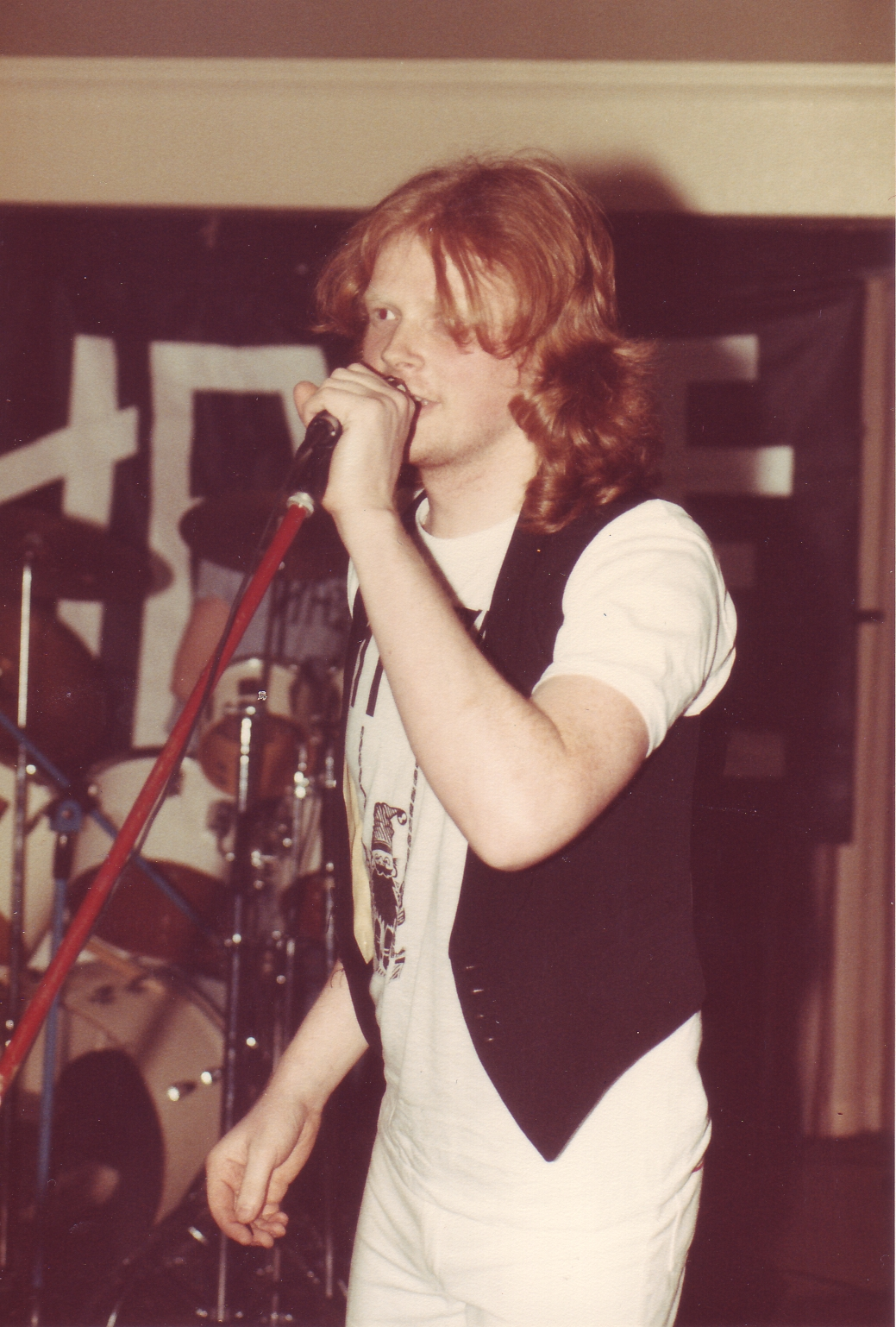
Paul McMahon

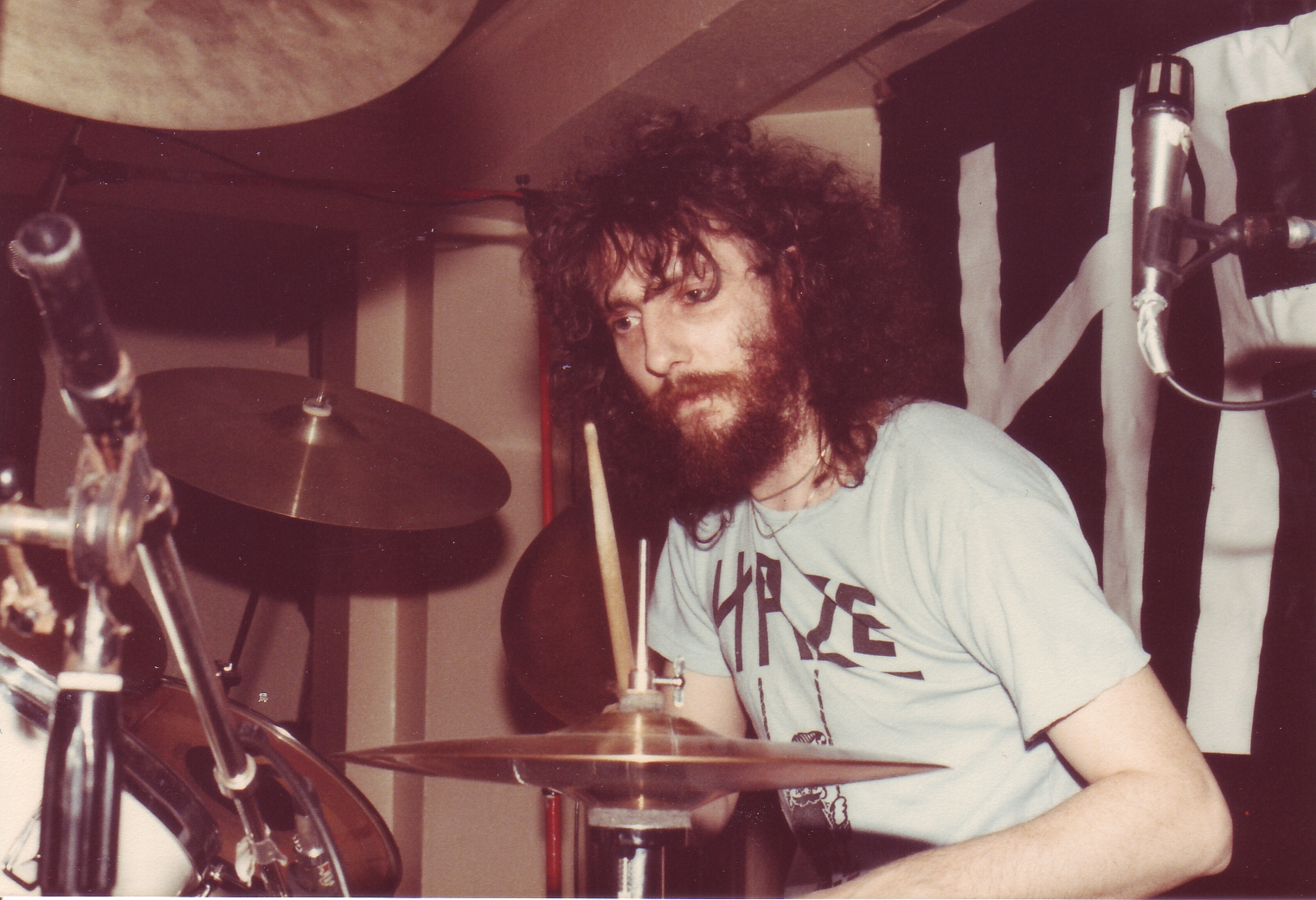
Paul Chisnell

== Discography ==
=== Singles and EPs ===
- "The Night" (1981, 7" single)
- "The Ember" (12" EP, 1985)
- "Tunnel Vision" / "Shadows" (1986, 7" single)

=== Albums ===
- The Cellar Tapes (1983, C-Cassette)
- C'est La Vie (1984)
- Cellar Replay (1985)
- Warts 'n' All (1986, live album)
- Stoat & Bottle (1987)
- Humphrey (1988)
- The 10th Anniversary Gig
- In Concert
- 20th Anniversary Show (1998)
- 30th Anniversary Show (2008)
- The Last Battle (2013)
- 40th Anniversary Show (2018)
- Back to the Bones (2020)
- The Water's Edge (2024)

=== Compilations albums ===
- Old New Burrowed & Blue (No Third Mole) (1986)
- The Peterborough Tapes (1987)
- Last Orders (1989)
- In the End: 1978–88 (1992)
- C'est La Vie / The Ember (1996)
- 20th Anniversary Tape: 1978–98 (1998)

=== Videos ===
- In That Branch of the Lake (Lecco 9 April 2010) (2010, Recorded live on their Italian Tour in April 2010)
- 40th anniversary show (Sheffield 23 June 2018) (2018, Recorded live at the Greystones, Sheffield 2018)
