= Eddie McMahon =

Scottish footballer

Personal information
- Full name: Edward McMahon
- Date of birth: 1885
- Place of birth: Addiewell, Scotland
- Height: 5 ft 7 in (1.70 m)
- Position: Inside left

Senior career*
Years	Team	Apps	(Gls)
–1904	Kelly Rangers		
1904–1909	Cowdenbeath	33	(6)
1908–1909	Portsmouth		
1909–1910	Bathgate		
1912–1913	Raith Rovers		
	Brentford	0	(0)
- York City
1913	Clapton Orient	3	(0)
- Boscombe
- * Club domestic league appearances and goals

Edward McMahon was a Scottish professional footballer who played as an inside forward in the Scottish League for Cowdenbeath. He also played in the Football League for Clapton Orient.
