= Sweet Sunshine =

- Directed by: Craig McMahon
- Written by: Craig McMahon
- Produced by: Craig McMahon
- Starring: John Way; Savanah D. McMahon
- Edited by: Jacob Bricca; Craig McMahon
- Music by: Louis Yoelin
- Production company: Fit Via Vi Film Productions
- Distributed by: Indie Rights
- Release date: 13 March 2020
- Running time: 94 minutes
- Country: United States
- Language: English

Sweet Sunshine is a 2020 American musical drama film directed by Craig McMahon, starring John Way and Savanah D. McMahon.

== Cast ==
- John Way as TJ Millhouse
- Savanah D. McMahon as Sunshine
- Julie Van Lith as Kat
- Mackenzie Coffman as Dakota Millhouse
- Savannah Wix as Tonya
- Rob Edwards as Hank
- Debra Ann Byrd as Hope

== Reception ==
Jackie K. Cooper gave the film a rating of 5/10 and praised Way's performance and the soundtrack but stated that the film "looks like it was filmed on a shoestring.

Stephanie W. of Dove.org wrote that while the film "offers predominantly nice production values", some of the performances are "uneven" and several scenes "seem subtly stilted".

Tara McNara of Common Sense Media rated the film 2 stars out of 5 and wrote that while Way is "amiable and charming" and "demonstrates real talent", and the soundtrack is "surprisingly and consistently good", the quality of the audio is "poor" and script not "solid".

Alan Ng of Film Threat gave the film a score of 3/10 and wrote that while the music is "good", the production values and the acting are "relatively typical for low budget indie films" and the script is "highly predictable".
