= William O'Meara (bishop) =

William O'Meara was a Roman Catholic Bishop in the 18th century.

O'Meara was appointed Bishop of Ardfert and Aghadoe in November 1743; and translated to Killaloe in 1753. He died on 16 May 1765.
