= Sir John McMahon, 1st Baronet =

British Army officer and politician

Colonel The Right Honourable Sir John McMahon Bt
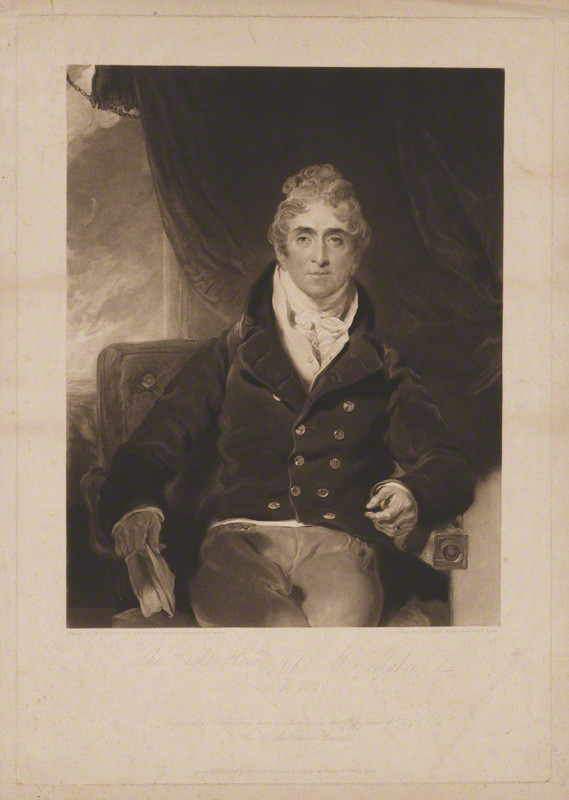
- 1815 engraving by Charles Turner, after a painting by Sir Thomas Lawrence

Private Secretary to the Prince Regent
- In office 1811–1817
- Preceded by: Lt. Gen. Sir Herbert Taylor
- Succeeded by: Lt. Gen. Sir Benjamin Bloomfield

Colonel Sir John McMahon, 1st Baronet (c. 1754 – 12 September 1817) was a British Army officer and politician who served as the Private Secretary to the Prince Regent from 1811 to 1817.

== Biography ==
He was born in Limerick, son of John MacMahon, comptroller of the port of Limerick; little is known of his mother, and even her name is uncertain. By his second wife, Mary Stackpoole, his father has two other sons William and Thomas, who both achieved distinction.

McMahon was commissioned into the 44th Foot, and later transferred to the 48th Foot and the 87th Foot. He served as a Member of Parliament for Aldeburgh from 1802 to 1812. He was Paymaster of Widows Pensions in 1812. He was Keeper of the Privy Purse, Auditor of the Duchy of Cornwall, and Secretary to the Duke of Cornwall. A proposal that he receive a salary of £2,000 as Private Secretary was rejected by Parliament in 1812.

McMahon was appointed a Privy Counsellor in 1812, and died in 1817, having been made a Baronet shortly before his death. He was succeeded in the baronetcy according to a special remainder by his brother General Sir Thomas McMahon, 2nd Baronet. He undoubtedly used his position to benefit his family: his half-brother William MacMahon obtained the coveted judicial office of Master of the Rolls in Ireland through John's influence, and he proved to be a popular and respected judge.

He had no children, but his title passed by special remainder to his brother Thomas.

He had at least one sister Mrs O'Halloran, whose daughter married Richard Lalor Sheil, against her own family's wishes, and died young in childbirth.

== Literary references ==
He is a minor character in Georgette Heyer's novel Regency Buck, which shows him in a rather unflattering light.

Parliament of the United Kingdom
Preceded by Sir John Aubrey; George Johnstone	Member of Parliament for Aldeburgh; 1802–1812; With: Sir John Aubrey	Succeeded by Sir John Aubrey; Sandford Graham
Political offices
Preceded by Thomas Tyrwhitt	Auditor of the Duchy of Cornwall; 1803–1816	Succeeded by Sir Benjamin Bloomfield
Preceded by Mark Singleton	Storekeeper of the Ordnance; 1806–1807	Succeeded by Mark Singleton
Preceded by Richard Brinsley Sheridan	Receiver-General of the Duchy of Cornwall; 1816–1817	Succeeded by Lord William Gordon
Court offices
Preceded by Herbert Taylor as Private Secretary to King George III	Private Secretary to the Prince Regent; 1811–1817	Succeeded by Sir Benjamin Bloomfield
Preceded by The Earl of Cardigan	Keeper of the Privy Purse; 1812–1817	Succeeded by Sir Benjamin Bloomfield
Baronetage of the United Kingdom
New creation	Baronet (of Ashley Manor); 1817	Succeeded by Thomas McMahon
