= Kevin McMahon (footballer, born 1946) =

English footballer

Personal information
- Date of birth: 1 March 1946 (age 80)
- Place of birth: Tantobie, England
- Position: Forward

Senior career*
Years	Team	Apps	(Gls)
- Consett
1967–1969	Newcastle United	0	(0)
1969–1972	York City	93	(31)
1971–1972	→ Bolton Wanderers (loan)	6	(1)
1972–1973	Barnsley	5	(0)
1973–1976	Hartlepool United	107	(29)
- Gateshead United
- * Club domestic league appearances and goals

Kevin McMahon (born 1 March 1946) is an English former footballer who played as a forward in the Football League for York City, Bolton Wanderers, Barnsley and Hartlepool United.
