= Kevin McMahon (Gaelic footballer) =

Irish Gaelic footballer

Personal information
- Native name: Caoimhín Mac Mathúna (Irish)
- Born: Rosscarbery, County Cork
- Occupation: Civil servant
- Height: 6 ft 2 in (188 cm)

Sport
- Sport: Gaelic football
- Position: Half-forward
Club
- Years: Club
- 2000-present: Carbery Rangers
Club titles
- Cork titles: 1
Inter-county
Years	County	Apps (scores)
2002-2007	Cork	17 (2-15)
Inter-county titles
- Munster titles: 2 (2 as sub)
- All-Irelands: 0
- NFL: 0
- All Stars: 0

Kevin McMahon (born 1982 in Rosscarbery, County Cork) is an Irish sportsperson. He plays Gaelic football with his local club Carbery Rangers and was a member of the Cork senior inter-county team from 2004 until 2008.
