= Mike McMahon Sr. =

Canadian ice hockey player

- Born: February 1, 1915 Brockville, Ontario, Canada
- Died: December 3, 1974 (aged 59)
- Height: 5 ft 8 in (173 cm)
- Weight: 215 lb (98 kg; 15 st 5 lb)
- Position: Defence
- Shot: Left
- Played for: Montreal Canadiens; Boston Bruins
- Playing career: 1935–1949

Michael Clarence McMahon Sr. (February 1, 1915 – December 3, 1974) was a Canadian professional ice hockey player who played 57 games in the National Hockey League (NHL) between 1943 and 1946. Born in Brockville, Ontario, he played for the Montreal Canadiens and Boston Bruins. He won the Stanley Cup in 1944 with the Montreal Canadiens. His son Mike McMahon Jr. also played in the NHL.

== Career statistics ==
=== Regular season and playoffs ===
			Regular season					Playoffs
Season	Team	League	GP	G	A	Pts	PIM	GP	G	A	Pts	PIM
1935–36	Brockville Magedomas	LOVHL	17	11	8	19	27	7	6	3	9	8
1935–36	Brockville Magedomas	Al-Cup	—	—	—	—	—	6	3	3	6	13
1936–37	Cornwall Flyers	LOVHL	17	7	13	20	48	6	2	2	4	6
1937–38	Cornwall Flyers	LOVHL	24	17	17	34	34	11	6	4	10	33
1937–38	Cornwall Flyers	Al-Cup	—	—	—	—	—	11	6	4	10	33
1938–39	Cornwall Flyers	LOVHL	38	20	34	54	144	9	3	5	8	22
1939–40	Cornwall Flyers	QSHL	30	2	7	9	81	5	2	3	5	14
1940–41	Quebec Aces	QSHL	33	5	11	16	57	4	1	1	2	4
1941–42	Quebec Aces	QSHL	40	16	11	27	76	7	4	2	6	14
1941–42	Quebec Aces	Al-Cup	—	—	—	—	—	6	1	3	4	18
1942–43	Quebec Aces	QSHL	33	6	24	30	73	4	1	2	3	20
1942–43	Ottawa Commandos	QSHL	—	—	—	—	—	2	0	2	2	0
1942–43	Montreal Royals	QSHL	—	—	—	—	—	1	0	0	0	2
1942–43	Montreal Canadiens	NHL	1	0	0	0	0	5	0	0	0	14
1943–44	Montreal Canadiens	NHL	42	7	17	24	86	8	1	2	3	16
1944–45	Montreal Royals	QSHL	10	6	16	22	58	7	1	2	3	8
1945–46	Montreal Canadiens	NHL	13	0	1	1	2	—	—	—	—	—
1945–46	Boston Bruins	NHL	2	0	0	0	2	—	—	—	—	—
1945–46	Buffalo Bisons	AHL	26	2	14	16	50	12	5	1	6	14
1946–47	Dallas Texans	USHL	13	1	3	4	43	—	—	—	—	—
1946–47	Buffalo Bisons	AHL	50	12	28	40	68	4	1	0	1	4
1947–48	Houston Huskies	USHL	39	7	11	18	91	—	—	—	—	—
1947–48	Buffalo Bisons	AHL	17	2	9	11	15	8	0	2	2	16
1948–49	Springfield Indians	AHL	16	2	4	6	14	—	—	—	—	—
AHL totals			109	18	55	73	147	24	6	3	9	34
QSHL totals			146	35	69	104	345	30	9	12	21	62
NHL totals			58	7	18	25	90	13	1	2	3	30
