= Kevin McMahon (Australian footballer) =

Australian rules footballer (1930–2022)

Personal information
- Full name: Kevin McMahon
- Born: 17 May 1930
- Died: 14 July 2022 (aged 92)
- Original team: North Melbourne
- Height: 170 cm (5 ft 7 in)
- Weight: 71 kg (157 lb)

Playing career^{1}
Years	Club	Games (Goals)
1949–1959	North Melbourne	119 (11)
- ^{1} Playing statistics correct to the end of 1959.

Kevin McMahon (17 May 1930 – 14 July 2022) was an Australian rules footballer who played with North Melbourne in the Victorian Football League (VFL).

McMahon, a wingman, made his way up from the North Melbourne thirds to make his first senior appearance in 1949. The following year he played a semi-final, but wasn't selected in North Melbourne's 1950 VFL Grand Final team. In 1951 he finished second in the club's Best and Fairest award. He represented the VFL an interstate match against Western Australia at the Melbourne Cricket Ground in 1955.
