= Michael McMahon (rugby union) =

- Born: Michael John McMahon; 28 September 1889
- Died: March 6, 1960 (aged 70)

Rugby union career
- Position: Fullback
International career
Years	Team	Apps	(Points)
1913	Wallabies	1	(2)

Michael John 'Tat' McMahon (28 September 1889 – 6 March 1960) was a rugby union player who represented Australia.

McMahon, a fullback from Rockhampton, claimed 1 international rugby cap for Australia in 1913 as a replacement for Bob Willcocks. He injured his should in 1914, and in 1916 enlisted to join the First Australian Imperial Force as part of the replacements for the 31st Battalion.
