= Mike McMahon Jr. =

Canadian ice hockey player

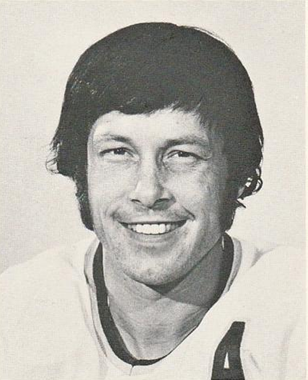
- Born: August 30, 1941 Quebec City, Quebec, Canada
- Died: April 29, 2013 (aged 71) Saint Paul, Minnesota, U.S.
- Height: 5 ft 11 in (180 cm)
- Weight: 177 lb (80 kg; 12 st 9 lb)
- Position: Defence
- Shot: Left
- Played for: New York Rangers; Minnesota North Stars; Chicago Black Hawks; Detroit Red Wings; Pittsburgh Penguins; Buffalo Sabres; Minnesota Fighting Saints; San Diego Mariners
- Playing career: 1962–1977

Michael William McMahon Jr. (August 30, 1941 – April 29, 2013) was a Canadian ice hockey defenceman who played in the National Hockey League (NHL) for the New York Rangers, Minnesota North Stars, Chicago Black Hawks, Detroit Red Wings, Pittsburgh Penguins and the Buffalo Sabres between 1963 and 1972. He also played in the World Hockey Association for the Minnesota Fighting Saints and San Diego Mariners between 1972 and 1976. He played 224 games in the NHL, scoring 15 goals and 83 points, and 269 games in the WHA, scoring 29 goals and 130 points. His father, Mike Sr. also played in the NHL. McMahon was born in Quebec City, Quebec.

He died in Saint Paul, Minnesota on April 29, 2013.

== Career statistics ==
=== Regular season and playoffs ===
			Regular season					Playoffs
Season	Team	League	GP	G	A	Pts	PIM	GP	G	A	Pts	PIM
1959–60	Guelph Biltmores	OHA	48	7	16	23	0	—	—	—	—	—
1960–61	Guelph Royals	OHA	46	10	36	46	0	—	—	—	—	—
1961–62	Guelph Royals	OHA	45	9	28	37	0	—	—	—	—	—
1961–62	Kitchener-Waterloo Beavers	EPHL	5	0	1	1	0	3	0	0	0	0
1962–63	Sudbury Wolves	EPHL	71	12	39	51	107	8	3	3	6	8
1963–64	Baltimore Clippers	AHL	40	7	10	17	66	—	—	—	—	—
1963–64	New York Rangers	NHL	18	0	1	1	16	—	—	—	—	—
1963–64	St. Paul Rangers	CPHL	13	3	9	12	30	—	—	—	—	—
1964–65	Baltimore Clippers	AHL	8	0	0	0	6	—	—	—	—	—
1964–65	New York Rangers	NHL	1	0	0	0	0	—	—	—	—	—
1964–65	St. Paul Rangers	CPHL	63	20	41	61	204	11	4	5	9	23
1965–66	New York Rangers	NHL	41	0	12	12	34	—	—	—	—	—
1965–66	Minnesota Rangers	CPHL	25	3	13	16	45	4	1	3	4	0
1966–67	Houston Apollos	CPHL	64	13	37	50	129	6	0	3	3	6
1966–67	Quebec Aces	AHL	—	—	—	—	—	1	0	1	1	0
1967–68	Minnesota North Stars	NHL	74	14	33	47	71	14	3	7	10	4
1968–69	Cleveland Barons	AHL	6	1	4	5	4	—	—	—	—	—
1968–69	Minnesota North Stars	NHL	43	0	11	11	21	—	—	—	—	—
1968–69	Chicago Black Hawks	NHL	20	0	8	8	6	—	—	—	—	—
1969–70	Baltimore Clippers	AHL	48	13	25	38	29	5	0	0	0	2
1969–70	Detroit Red Wings	NHL	2	0	0	0	0	—	—	—	—	—
1969–70	Pittsburgh Penguins	NHL	12	1	3	4	19	—	—	—	—	—
1970–71	Buffalo Sabres	NHL	12	0	0	0	4	—	—	—	—	—
1970–71	Springfield Kings	AHL	36	5	14	19	43	12	3	10	13	57
1971–72	Providence Reds	AHL	39	3	19	22	74	—	—	—	—	—
1971–72	Rochester Americans	AHL	9	0	10	10	4	—	—	—	—	—
1971–72	New York Rangers	NHL	1	0	0	0	0	—	—	—	—	—
1972–73	Minnesota Fighting Saints	WHA	75	12	39	51	87	6	0	6	6	6
1973–74	Minnesota Fighting Saints	WHA	71	10	35	45	82	11	1	7	8	9
1974–75	Minnesota Fighting Saints	WHA	64	5	15	20	42	7	0	1	1	0
1975–76	San Diego Mariners	WHA	69	2	12	14	38	9	0	1	1	2
1976–77	Springfield Indians	AHL	59	6	25	31	64	—	—	—	—	—
WHA totals			269	29	101	130	249	32	1	14	15	13
NHL totals			224	15	68	83	171	14	3	7	10	4
