= Sir Thomas McMahon, 2nd Baronet =

British Army officer

Lieutenant-General Sir Thomas McMahon Bt
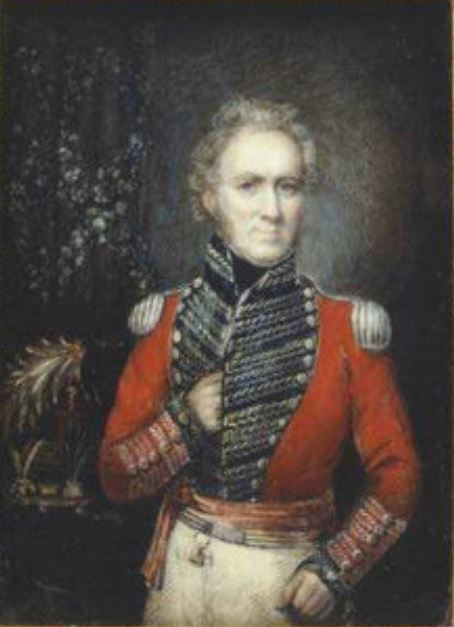
- Portrait by Jivan Ram
- Born: 1779
- Died: 1860 (aged 80–81)
- Military career
- Allegiance: United Kingdom
- Branch: British Army
- Rank: Lieutenant-General
- Commands: Bombay Army
- Conflicts: Peninsula War
- Awards: Knight Commander of the Order of the Bath

Lieutenant-General Sir Thomas McMahon, 2nd Baronet (1779–1860) was a British Army officer.

== Family ==
He was the youngest son of John MacMahon, comptroller of the Port of Limerick, and his second wife Mary Stackpoole, daughter of James Stackpoole. He had a full brother, Sir William MacMahon, 1st Baronet, Master of the Rolls in Ireland, and an elder half-brother, Sir John McMahon, 1st Baronet, Private Secretary to the Prince Regent from 1811 to 1817. He had at least one sister, who married a Mr O'Halloran: her daughter, whose first name is uncertain, was the first wife of the writer and politician Richard Lalor Sheil. She died in childbirth in 1822.

While Thomas and William were both gifted men, their early careers were hampered by their relatively humble social origins, and there is little doubt that their half-brother's political influence greatly assisted them in their rise to prominence.

John was the first of the McMahon Baronets of Ashley Manor: on his death in 1817, the title passed to Thomas by special remainder.

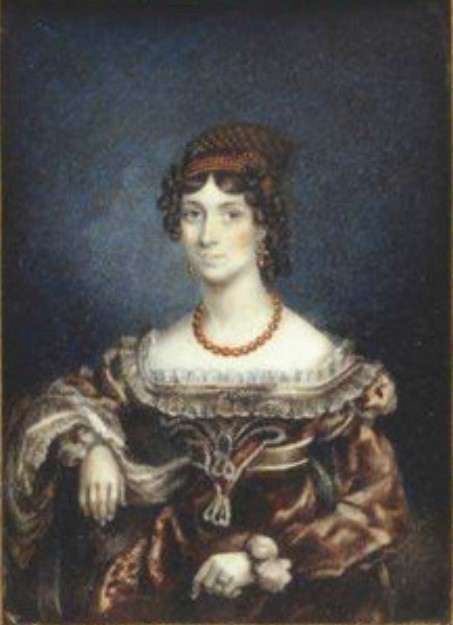
Lady McMahon in 1824, by Jivan Ram

He married Emily Westropp, daughter of Michael Roberts Westropp of Sunvile, County Limerick (not to be confused with his grandson, Sir Michael Roberts Westropp) and Jane Godsell, and they had nine children, including General Sir Thomas Westropp McMahon, 3rd Baronet.

== Military career ==
McMahon served in the Portuguese army in the Peninsular War and became adjutant-general in India. He went on to be Lieutenant-Governor of Portsmouth and General Officer Commanding South-West District in 1834 and became Commander-in-chief of the Bombay Army on 14 February 1840 retiring from that post on 8 April 1847.

Military offices
Preceded by Sir Colin Campbell	GOC South-West District; 1834–1839	Succeeded by Sir Hercules Pakenham
Preceded by Sir John Keane	C-in-C, Bombay Army; 1840–1847	Succeeded by Sir Willoughby Cotton
Preceded by Sir John Colborne	Colonel of the 94th Regiment of Foot; 1838–1847	Succeeded by Sir William Warre
Preceded by Sir John Lambert	Colonel of the 10th (North Lincoln) Regiment of Foot; 1847–1860	Succeeded by Thomas Burke
Baronetage of the United Kingdom
Preceded by John McMahon	Baronet (of Ashley Manor); 1817–1860	Succeeded by Thomas McMahon
