= Jennifer A. McMahon =

Australian philosopher (1956–2023)

Jennifer Anne McMahon (14 March 1956 – 5 June 2023) was an Australian philosopher who was a professor emerita at the University of Adelaide.

== Early life and education ==
McMahon was born in Coburg, Melbourne on 14 March 1956. She completed her early education at St Mark's Catholic Parish Primary School and Mercy College Coburg.

McMahon earned a Bachelor of Fine Arts at RMIT University with a specialization on painting, drawing, and art history. In 1978, she acquired a Diploma of Education from Melbourne State College, leading to teaching roles at Northcote High School and the University High School, Parkville. Concurrently, she exhibited her artworks, with a solo exhibition at the Niagara Gallery in 1981 and a subsequent one in 1983. In 1982, she studied visual arts in Florence on an Italian government scholarship.

McMahon also pursued a master's degree in education at the University of Melbourne, completing a research thesis, "The possibility of objectivity in aesthetic evaluation in the visual arts", in 1990. From 1992 to 1996, she worked on her doctoral thesis in philosophy, "Aesthetics, cognition and creativity", at the Australian National University.

== Career ==
In the mid-1980s, McMahon worked for the Melbourne Theatre Company and 3CR Melbourne.

The subsequent decade saw McMahon involved in arts education at institutions such as Outer Eastern College of TAFE and Melbourne College of Advanced Education. By 1996, she took up a lecturer position in arts education at the University of Canberra.

In 2002, McMahon moved to the University of Adelaide, where she became its first female professor of philosophy. Her research areas included aesthetics, cognitive science, and Kant studies. Her written works include the books Aesthetics and Material Beauty: Aesthetics Naturalized (2007) and Art and Ethics in a Material World: Kant's Pragmatist Legacy (2014). She also contributed to various academic anthologies and research resources. McMahon served on several academic boards and committees, including her role as executive secretary of the Australasian Association of Philosophy from 2014 to 2017.

McMahon was appointed professor emerita upon her retirement from the University of Adelaide in 2022. She died in Adelaide on 5 June 2023.

== Bibliography ==
- Aesthetics and Material Beauty: Aesthetics Naturalized (2007)
- Art and Ethics in a Material World: Kant's Pragmatist Legacy (2014)
- Social Aesthetics and Moral Judgment: Pleasure, Reflection and Accountability (2018)
