= Kevin R. McMahon =

American conductor, composer, orchestrator and violinist

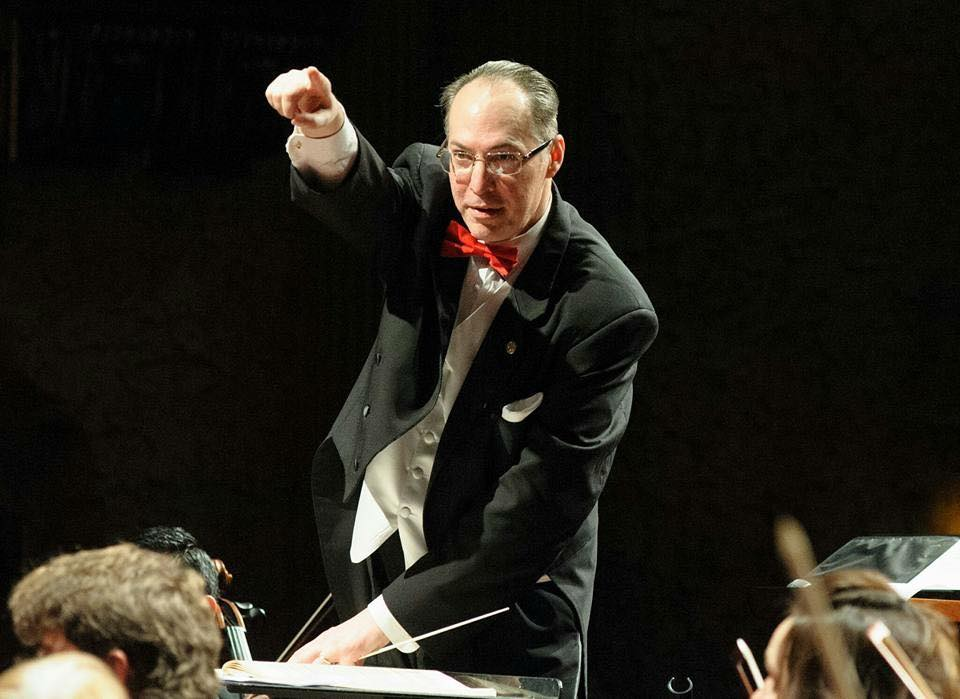

Kevin R. McMahon (born October 12, 1962, in Grand Rapids, Michigan) is an American, orchestra/opera/ballet conductor, composer/orchestrator/arranger, clinician/adjudicator, and violinist.

McMahon attended the University of Michigan, where his primary teachers were Jacob Krachmalnick on violin and conducting with Gustav Meier.

McMahon was awarded the Collins Wisconsin Distinguished Fellowship, earning a Doctor of Musical Arts in Conducting from the University of Wisconsin-Madison. His primary teachers were David E. Becker (orchestral conducting), James Smith (as assistant conductor for the opera program), Charles Dill (musicology), Stephen Dembski (composition) and William Farlow (opera).

McMahon's seminar and private conducting teachers were:

Margaret Hillis, Harold Farberman, Gustav Meier, and David E. Becker

Conducting course teachers include:

Gunther Schuller, Daniel Lewis, Otto Werner Mueller, Hugo Jan Huss, Carl St. Clair, Robert Bernhardt, Francesco Italiano, Maurice Abravanel, Robert McNally, Herbert Blomstedt, Donald Thulean, John Farrer, Fritz Maraffi, David Amram, Lukas Foss, Maurice Peress, Irwin Bazelon, Larry Alan Smith, Ellen Taafe Zwilich, David Diamond, John Giordano, Larry Newland, Carl Topilow, Brian Priestman, Donald Portnoy, Erich Leinsdorf, Leonard Slatkin, Seiji Ozawa, Robert Spano, and Bernard Haitink

His private conducting teachers included:

Elizabeth A. H. Green, Marvin Rabin, Paul Vermel, Barbara Schubert, Michael Morgan, Chai Dong Chung, Leo Najar, Patrick Strub, and Donald Schleicher

Opera teachers included:

William Farlow, Gunther Schuller, Henry Holt, Samuel Jones, James Smith, and Donald Portnoy

Choral Conducting teachers included:

Margaret Hillis, Thomas Hilbish, and Beverly Taylor

Conducting Courses included:

Bruckner Symposium (Chicago Symphony Orchestra with Sir Georg Solti and Margaret Hillis); Goettingen Symphonie Orchester, Germany with Otto Werner Mueller; Festival at Sandpoint with Gunther Schuller (two summers); League of American Orchestras Workshops; Conductor's Guild Opera Conducting Workshop; Conductors Institute, South Carolina (three summers); New York Philharmonic Symposium with Eric Leinsdorf, Active Participant; Spoleto Festival USA; Tanglewood Music Center

Conducting Master Classes:

Giuseppe Sinopoli, Leonard Bernstein, Patrick Strub, and Marvin Rabin

Attendance at rehearsals:

Chicago Symphony Orchestra, Civic Orchestra of Chicago, Chicago Symphony Chorus, Cleveland Orchestra, Boston Symphony Orchestra, Seattle Symphony Orchestra, New York Philharmonic, St. Louis Symphony Orchestra, Vienna Philharmonic, Lyric Opera of Chicago, Pacific Symphony Orchestra, Madison Symphony Orchestra, National Symphony Orchestra, Radio Filharmonish Orkest (Hilversum) Amsterdam, Spokane Symphony Orchestra, Weimar Staatsoper, and the Komische Oper (Berlin)

Conducting Experience:

Former conducting positions include music director/conductor of the Symphony School of America Chamber Orchestra (1985–1986), music director/conductor of the National Arts Chamber Orchestra(1985–1988), music director/conductor Classical Symphony Chamber Ensemble (1988–1989), music director/conductor Lincoln Opera of Chicago (1989–1994), cover conductor for the South Bend Symphony (1992–1995), music director/conductor of the Northwest Indiana Youth Orchestra (1989–2000), and music director and conductor of the Illinois Valley Symphony Orchestra (1995–2008). He served as music director/conductor for the Wheaton Symphony and Pops Orchestra from 2009 to 2017. McMahon served as artistic director/conductor/violin recitalist for the Maud Powell Music Festival from 1999 to 2018. In October 2009, McMahon guest conducted for the Sheboygan Symphony Orchestra for the first time, and on success of that appearance, in 2010 was named the orchestra's music director/conductor serving from 2010 to 2020. He served as associate conductor for the New York (City) Repertory Orchestra from 2005 to 2021. With the same orchestra, he currently serves as cover conductor. McMahon is orchestra director for the Purdue University Fort Wayne Orchestra. McMahon will serve on the faculty of the La Musica Lirica (Italy) during the summer of 2026.

McMahon's operatic performance repertory in Chicago and Roma, Italia (along with other companies) includes:

* = world premiere 
number = productions (often including multiple performances), 
these productions are fully staged with costumes, sets, orchestra, etc.

• Samuel Barber, A Hand of Bridge

• Leonard Bernstein, Trouble in Tahiti

• Georges Bizet, Carmen 2

• Gaetano Donizetti, L’elisir d’amore 2, Don Pasquale, Lucia di Lamermoor

• Andzej Hanzelewicz, Maud Powell-Queen of Violinists*

• Paul Hindemith, Wir Bauen Eine Stadt

• Engelbert Humperdinck, Hansel and Gretel 3

• Ruggiero Leoncavallo, I Pagliacci 2

• Pietro Mascagni, Cavalleria Rusticana 2

• Gian Carlo Menotti, Amahl and the Night Visitors 3. The Consul, (excerpts from The Last Savage, The Saint of Bleeker Street, Maria Golovin, and The Old Maid and the Thief, as well as other excerpts from previously listed Menotti works)

• Douglas Moore, The Devil and Daniel Webster

• W. A. Mozart, Die Zauberfloete 5, Le Nozze di Figaro 4, Don Giovanni 3, Cosi fan tutte 2

• Jacques Offenbach, Tales of Hoffmann

• Giacomo Puccini, La Bohème 3, Madama Butterfly, (Suor Angelica, video excerpt), Gianni Schicchi

• Gioachino Rossini, Il Barbiere di Siviglia 2

• Jonathan Schwabe, The Bake Shop Ghost*, The Sojourner*, The Hard Years*

• Johann Strauss II, Die Fledermaus 3

• Clarisse Tobia, Poe Requiem*

• Ralph Vaughan Williams, The Shepherd's of the Delectable Mountains

• Giuseppe Verdi, La Traviata 2, Rigoletto

• various composers, Aesop's Fables*

His musical theatre performances include:

• Frank Loesser, Guys and Dolls

• Kevin McMahon, Marilyn Monroe*

• Lucy Simon, The Secret Garden

• Meredith Willson, The Music Man

McMahon's ballet repertory includes:

• J. S. Bach, Concerto for Two Violins 3

• Benjamin Britten, Simple Symphony, Variations on a Theme of Frank Bridge, The Young Person's Guide to the Orchestra

• Paul Hindemith, The Four Temperaments,

• Ennio Morricone/Kevin McMahon, Gabriel's Oboe from The Mission

• W. A. Mozart, Sinfonie Concertante K. 364

• Otmar Nussio, Divertimento* Rome, Italy

• Sergei Prokofiev, Cinderella Rome, Italy

• Jonathan Schwabe, Peter Pan*3

• Pyotr Tchaikovsky, The Nutcracker 8, Sleeping Beauty

• Cesare Pugni, Pas de Quatre

• Johann Strauss II, The Blue Danube (Rome, Italy)

Academic Experience:

Academic appointments, including graduate school, include the University of Michigan, Kalamazoo College, Illinois Valley Community College, Northern Illinois University, University of Wisconsin-Madison, Ripon College (Wisconsin) and currently Purdue University Fort Wayne.

Guest Conducting/Concert Halls:

In the United States McMahon has guest conducted, or led orchestras, opera and ballet companies on tour, in New York City, Fort Wayne, Appleton, Bloomington, Marquette, Columbia, Minneapolis, Livonia, Chicago, Spokane, Elgin, Evanston, Tampa, South Bend, Cleveland, Indianapolis, Atlanta, Madison, Los Angeles, Ann Arbor, Milwaukee, and Washington, D.C.

McMahon has performed in venerable locations such as Carnegie Hall, Orchestra Hall (Chicago), Northwestern University, Hill Auditorium, Morris Civic Center, St. Mary's College, Kulas Hall (Cleveland Institute of Music), Georgetown University, The Shrine of the Immaculate Conception (Washington D. C.) McMahon was also involved in the opening performances of the Overture Center in Madison, Wisconsin.

In Europe McMahon served as resident conductor for the Rome Festival Opera, Orchestra, and Ballet (1995–2004). He conducted orchestras, operas, and ballet companies in Italy, Bulgaria, Greece, Romania, the Czech Republic, and Germany.

Further Experience:

The orchestras, theatre and ballet companies, and choruses McMahon worked with include: Symphony School of America Chamber Orchestra, Goettingen Symphonie Orchester, University of Michigan Symphony Orchestra and Philharmonia, University of Wisconsin (Madison) chamber and symphony orchestras, Ripon College Orchestra, Rome (Italy) Festival Opera, Orchestra, and Ballet, Spokane Symphony, Illinois Valley Symphony Orchestra, Sheboygan Symphony Orchestra, University of Wisconsin Opera and Department of Theatre and Drama, Northern Illinois University Philharmonic, Northwest Indiana Youth Orchestra, Northwest Indiana Symphony, Red Bud National Music Festival, Kalamazoo College and Community Orchestra, University of Chicago Prism Wind Orchestra, University of Michigan Campus Orchestra, Livonia Youth Symphony, Michigan Youth Symphony, Wisconsin Youth Symphony Orchestra (Youth Orchestra), Lawrence University Orchestra, Kennesaw State University Orchestra, Wheaton Symphony and Pops Orchestra, Wheaton Symphony Chorus, New York (City) Repertory Orchestra, South Bend Symphony Orchestra, Lincoln Opera (Chicago), Classical Symphony Chamber Ensemble, National Arts Chamber Orchestra, Fresco Opera Theatre, Middleton Community Orchestra, Georgia Ballet, Georgia Symphony Orchestra, Sheboygan Symphony Chorus, Georgia Youth Symphony Orchestra, Elgin Symphony Orchestra, Elgin Choral Union, Lincoln Park Sinfonietta, Evanton Symphony Orchestra, Heartland Philharmonic, Southfeld Ballet, Indiana Opera North, Marquette Symphony Orchestra, Varna Philharmonic, Forfest (Czech Republik), Indiana Ballet Theatre, Great Lakes Arts Symphony, Northwest Indiana Symphony Chorus, Imperial Dance Company, Etowah Youth/Faculty Symphony, Civic Orchestra of Chicago, Classical Symphony Orchestra, Conductors Institute Festival Orchestra, Cassini Ensemble, Orchestra of Colours (Athens, Greece), Hungarian State Opera (Kluj-Napoca, Rumania), University of Michigan Choir, Damiana Ensemble (Czech Republik), Summit City Music Theatre, Missouri State University Orchestra, The Williams & Mary Symphony Orchestra, as well as numerous high school/middle school orchestras, all-region, and all-state orchestras.

McMahon as Composer:

Among McMahon's notable compositional achievements are the world premiere performances of his theater works Marilyn Monroe (2004) and librettist for Maud Powell-Queen of Violinists (2006). In March 2000 the Illinois Valley Symphony Orchestra premiered a symphony that was written by McMahon titled "Valley of the Illinois", for the orchestra's 50th Anniversary season.

McMahon was chosen as a fellow of the 1990 American Conductor/Composer program, where his On Spiritual Warfare premiered. The Etowah Youth Symphony, Paul Pierce conductor, commissioned and gave a double premiere of McMahon's On the Pre-eminence of Love, for Soprano and Orchestra. McMahon's European, compositional debut was in the Czech Republik, on his work Transfiguration for orchestra. Other compositions include a Jazz Suite for Violin and Piano, Seven Songs from Rome for soprano and piano, an unaccompanied flute piece, choral works, piano works, a chamber work for voice/piano/violin/percussion, Unione delle esame (in several versions for voices and instruments), a musical, and an opera. McMahon's transcriptions and arrangements for orchestra include music by Brahms, Jeffrey Britton, Coulter, Confrey, Mack and Johnson, Marybeth Maziarz, Morricone, Rachmaninoff, Refice, Schubert, Robert Schumann, and string quartet transcriptions of guitar repertoire.

McMahon was the 2022 commissioned composer by the National Music Teachers Association in tandem with the Indiana Music Teachers Association. The commissioned work was Moments in Time, for piano, which was premiered Fall of 2022 at the Indiana state conference.

Awards:

In 2002, McMahon was recognized for Meritorious Service in Orchestra Conducting by the Illinois Council of Orchestras. The presentation of the award took place at the Union League Club of Chicago and was followed by a reception in honor of Maestro McMahon and other award recipients. The event was sponsored by the Chicago Fine Arts Society.

Among the awards Kevin McMahon received, the most prestigious was the Collins Wisconsin Distinguished Fellowship, enabling him to pursue and earn a Doctor of Musical Arts.

Premieres:

As conductor, Kevin McMahon strongly supports contemporary music, which led to a number of European premieres, United States premieres, and eighty-five world premieres of stage and concert works.

McMahon as Violinist:

As a violinist, McMahon performed with many orchestras.

He served as Concertmaster for: Detroit Metropolitan Orchestra, Plymouth Symphony Orchestra, Saginaw Symphony Orchestra (all pops and children's concerts, some subscriptions) Rome Festival Orchestra (including chamber music assignments), Beloit-Janesville Symphony (also string quartet violin 1), Heartland Philharmonic, Opera Factory, Classical Symphony Orchestra, Illinois Valley Symphony Orchestra, Hinsdale Chamber Orchestra, Concertmaster of the University of Michigan Philharmonia (graduate teaching assistant with Carl St. Clair), student concertmaster Symphony School of America, University of Michigan Gilbert and Sullivan Society, Comic Opera Guild, Toledo Opera Orchestra (special event), and the National Arts Chamber Orchestra (including chamber music such as the Beethoven Septet).

He served as Associate Concertmaster for: Northwest Indiana Symphony (violin 1 in string quartet and sometimes concertmaster), South Bend Symphony Orchestra, Southwest Michigan Symphony Orchestra, and the Saginaw Symphony Orchestra.

He performed as a first violinist with: Alabama Symphony Orchestra, Toledo Symphony Orchestra, Toledo Opera Orchestra, Kalamazoo Symphony Orchestra, Illinois Philharmonic, Elgin Symphony Orchestra, Lansing Symphony Orchestra, Flint Symphony Orchestra, Windsor (Ont.) Symphony Orchestra (chair 5), and the New York Repertory Orchestra.

McMahon served as principal second violin in: Camera da Musica, and the Adrian Symphony.

Other orchestras he's performed with: Milwaukee Symphony Orchestra (first and second violin, twice as an honorable mention winner in their Young Artist Competition).

He currently is a regular substitute with the Fort Wayne Philharmonic on second and first violin.

McMahon served as a soloist with the Symphony School of America Chamber Orchestra (multiple times), Saginaw Symphony Chamber Orchestra, Northwest Indiana Youth Orchestra, Madison East High School Orchestra, the National Arts Chamber Orchestra and the Sterling Festival Orchestra.

Dr. McMahon regularly performs as a violin recitalist.
