= Mike McMahon (professor) =

British surgeon

Professor Michael J. McMahon is a surgeon specialising in upper gastrointestinal surgery, particularly the pancreas and biliary tract.

Professor McMahon was a lecturer and senior registrar and subsequently a senior lecturer, reader and professor of surgery before becoming a consultant surgeon. He currently holds positions as a Consultant General and Laparoscopic Surgeon, a Senior Lecturer in Surgery, and Assistant Director of the Leeds University Department of Surgery.

== Education ==
He qualified from Sheffield University in 1967, gaining a Master of Surgery (ChM), before training at the University of Birmingham, where he obtained a PhD.

== Career ==
In the 1980s, McMahon carried out laparoscopy for diagnosis under local anaesthesia, realising that laparoscopic surgery, also called minimally invasive surgery (MIS) or keyhole surgery, had the potential to bring about a revolution in surgical practice.

McMahon visited one of the pioneers of laparoscopy, Dr Joe Petelin, in Kansas City, USA, in spring 1990. Together, they organised the UK's first teaching course on laparoscopic (keyhole) surgery in Leeds in June 1990. There, Petelin demonstrated the operation of laparoscopic cholecystectomy (removal of the gallbladder). Since then, Leeds has become a major centre for advanced laparoscopic surgery.

In 1999, McMahon started to undertake laparoscopic surgery for obesity, calling upon the experience of his colleagues who were performing the operations by traditional surgery; helping him to carry them out laparoscopically.

Alongside Professor David Johnston, McMahon performed the first laparoscopic M&M operation and this evolved into sleeve gastrectomy, which was first performed as a standalone operation in Leeds. It was carried out as the first stage of the operation of duodenal switch by Michel Gagnier, whom McMahon visited in New York. He then went on to perform the first laparoscopic gastric bypass in the UK, shortly followed by the first duodenal switch. McMahon worked with trainee, Simon Dexter, who has since become one of the leading obesity surgeons in the country.

Training of the new techniques for obesity surgery was funded by grants from the Wolfson Foundation and the Leeds Teaching Hospitals NHS Trust. This enabled a state of the art training facility to be established in Leeds (the Leeds Institute for Minimally Invasive Therapy). Subsequently, much of the training techniques developed were incorporated into the Core Skills Course in Laparoscopic Surgery, run by the Royal College of Surgeons of England.

Professor McMahon's philosophy for 'keyhole' surgery was "to carry out the operation using all the safeguards that had been built up over the generations of 'open' surgery, rather than by cutting corners to make things easier when employing laparoscopic techniques".

Alongside Peter Moran (an engineer), Professor McMahon designed and built specialist instruments for laparoscopy surgery as the existing instruments made the job a challenge. They found it difficult to stimulate interest from established manufacturers so they founded Surgical Innovations PLC, which now has over 100 employees designing and building a large range of laparoscopical surgical instruments as well as inspection equipment for the airline industry.

McMahon was also involved in the design of the Nuffield Hospital in Leeds, so that it could become a centre of excellence for all types of laparoscopic surgery, especially the surgical treatment of obesity.

== Achievements ==
McMahon is a past president of both the Pancreatic Society of the UK and Ireland, and the Association of Laparoscopic Surgeons of Great Britain and Ireland. He is the founder member of the society of Minimally Invasive General Surgeons, and was Chairman of the Education Committee of the European Association of Endoscopic Surgery. He also established the Leeds Institute for Minimally Invasive Therapy (LIMIT).

In the past he was Education Officer and subsequently President of the Association of Endoscopic Surgeons of the UK and Ireland, and a Royal College of Surgeons tutor in Minimally Invasive Surgery. McMahon was the first surgeon in the UK to perform laparoscopic (minimally invasive) gastric bypass, duodenal switch, and sleeve gastrectomy.

McMahon is a Fellow of the Royal College of Surgeons, and holds an honorary doctorate from the University of Szeged in Hungary. He is Clinical Director of Surgical Innovations PLC and is still actively involved in the design of new surgical instruments.
