= Mike McMahon (Australian rules footballer) =

Australian rules footballer, born 1902

Personal information
- Full name: Michael McMahon
- Born: 19 January 1902
- Died: 23 December 1962 (aged 60)
- Height: 175 cm (5 ft 9 in)
- Weight: 76 kg (168 lb)

Playing career^{1}
Years	Club	Games (Goals)
1924, 1928–29	Fitzroy	7 (0)
- ^{1} Playing statistics correct to the end of 1929.

Mike McMahon (19 January 1902 – 23 December 1962) was an Australian rules footballer who played with Fitzroy in the Victorian Football League (VFL).
