= Thomas Westropp McMahon =

General Sir Thomas Westropp McMahon, 3rd Baronet, CB (14 February 1813 – 23 January 1892) was a senior British Army officer.

== Biography ==
He was born the eldest son of Sir Thomas McMahon, 2nd Baronet, an Army officer who was Commander-in-Chief of the Bombay Army, and Emily Anne, the daughter of Michael Roberts Westropp and Jane Godsell. The younger Sir Michael Roberts Westropp, Chief Justice of the High Court of Bombay, was his cousin. He succeeded his father as 3rd baronet in 1860.

He obtained a cornetcy in the 16th Lancers on 24 December 1829, and was transferred to the 6th (Inniskilling) Dragoons the following year. In the latter regiment, he was promoted lieutenant in 1831 and captain in 1838, transferring in 1842 as captain to the 9th Lancers. He went with the Lancers to India, under the command of Sir James Hope Grant, where he took part in the Sutlej campaign, seeing action at the Battle of Sobraon in 1846. He was promoted to a majority unattached on 13 July 1847.

He then served in Turkey and the Crimea as assistant quartermaster-general of the cavalry division and was present at the battles of the Alma, Bokklava (with the Heavy Brigade), the Tchettaya, and siege of Sebastopol. He was afterwards awarded a C.B., the Turkish medal and fifth class of the Medjidie. While in the Crimea, on the promotion of Sir James Yorke Scarlett, he was made lieutenant-colonel of the 5th Dragoon Guards in 1854, and commanded that regiment until he went on half-pay in 1861.

He became a major-general in 1869; commanded the Cavalry Brigade at Aldershot, and was inspector-general of cavalry from 1871 to 1876. He was promoted lieutenant-general in 1877, and full general on 12 April 1880.

In 1874 he received the honorary colonelcy of the 18th Hussars, transferring in 1885 to his old regiment, the 5th Dragoon Guards, a position he held until his death.

McMahon died at the Sycamores, Farnborough, Hampshire in 1892. He had married three times; firstly Dora Paulina, the youngest daughter of Evan Hamilton-Baillie, secondly Frances Mary, the daughter of John Holford and thirdly Constance Marianne, the widow of John Brooking. By his second wife, he had four sons, including Aubrey, his heir, all of whom served in the army, and one daughter.

Military offices
| Preceded by Sir Edward Cooper Hodge | Colonel of the 18th Hussars; 1874–1885 | Succeeded by William Drysdale |
| Preceded by Richard Parker | Colonel of the 5th Dragoon Guards; 1885–1892 | Succeeded by Somerset Gough-Calthorpe |
Baronetage of the United Kingdom
| Preceded by Thomas McMahon | Baronet (of Ashley Manor); 1860–1892 | Succeeded by Aubrey McMahon |
