= McMahon baronets =

Set index for Shelley baronets

There have been two baronetcies created for members of the McMahon family, both in the Baronetage of the United Kingdom, and belonging to different branches of the same family. One creation is extant as of 2026. The family surname is pronounced "Mac Ma-hon".

- McMahon baronets of Dublin (1815)
- McMahon baronets of Ashley Manor (1817)
