= 1944 Stanley Cup Final =

1944 ice hockey championship series

	1	2	3	4	Total
Montreal Canadiens	5	3	3	5*	4
Chicago Black Hawks	1	1	2	4*	0
- * – Denotes overtime period(s)
- Location(s): Montreal: Montreal Forum (1, 4); Chicago: Chicago Stadium (2, 3)
- Coaches: Montreal: Dick Irvin; Chicago: Paul Thompson
- Captains: Montreal: Toe Blake; Chicago: Doug Bentley
- Dates: April 4–13, 1944
- Series-winning goal: Toe Blake (9:12, OT)
- Hall of Famers: Canadiens: Toe Blake (1966); Emile Bouchard (1966); Bill Durnan (1964); Elmer Lach (1966); Buddy O'Connor (1988); Maurice Richard (1961); Black Hawks: Doug Bentley (1964); Bill Mosienko (1965); Earl Seibert (1963); Clint Smith (1991); Coaches: Dick Irvin (1958, player)

The 1944 Stanley Cup Final was a best-of-seven series between the Chicago Black Hawks and the Montreal Canadiens. The Canadiens swept the Black Hawks to win their first Stanley Cup since they defeated Chicago in 1931.

== Paths to the Finals ==
Chicago defeated the defending champion Detroit Red Wings in a best-of-seven 4–1 to advance to the Finals. Montreal defeated the Toronto Maple Leafs in a best-of-seven 4–1 to advance to the Finals.

== Game summaries ==
Maurice "Rocket" Richard made his Stanley Cup debut with a five-goal performance in the series, including a hat trick in game two. The Punch Line of Richard, Elmer Lach and Toe Blake scored ten of the Canadiens' 16 goals. Blake scored the Cup winner in overtime. In the same overtime, Bill Durnan stopped the first penalty shot awarded in the Finals, awarded to Virgil Johnson.

April 4	Chicago Black Hawks	1–5	Montreal Canadiens	Montreal Forum	Recap
No scoring		First period	8:37 - Phil Watson (2)
Clint Smith (4) - pp - 10:11		Second period	6:35 - pp - Toe Blake (5); 10:58 - Ray Getliffe (4)
No scoring		Third period	4:47 - Murph Chamberlain (5); 18:07 - Ray Getliffe (5)
Mike Karakas		Goalie stats	Bill Durnan

April 6	Montreal Canadiens	3–1	Chicago Black Hawks	Chicago Stadium	Recap
No scoring		First period	No scoring
Maurice Richard (8) - 13:00		Second period	No scoring
Maurice Richard (9) - 12:16; Maurice Richard (10) - 15:33		Third period	19:59 - John Harms (1)
Bill Durnan		Goalie stats	Mike Karakas

April 9	Montreal Canadiens	3–2	Chicago Black Hawks	Chicago Stadium	Recap
No scoring		First period	5:14 - George Allen (3)
Toe Blake (6) - 2:02		Second period	No scoring
Mike McMahon (1) - 5:47; Phil Watson (3) - 6:42		Third period	4:16 - John Harms (2)
Bill Durnan		Goalie stats	Mike Karakas

April 13	Chicago Black Hawks	4–5	OT	Montreal Canadiens	Montreal Forum	Recap
George Allen (4) - 5:12		First period		8:48 - Elmer Lach (1)
John Harms (3) - pp - 7:30; George Allen (5) - pp - 9:12; Doug Bentley (8) - 10:09		Second period		No scoring
No scoring		Third period		10:02 - Elmer Lach (2); 16:05 - Maurice Richard (11); 17:20 - Maurice Richard (12)
No scoring		First overtime period		9:12 - Toe Blake (7)
Mike Karakas		Goalie stats		Bill Durnan

Montreal won series 4–0

== Stanley Cup engraving ==
The 1944 Stanley Cup was presented to Canadiens captain Toe Blake by NHL President Red Dutton following the Canadiens 5–4 overtime win over the Black Hawks in game four.

The following Canadiens players and staff had their names engraved on the Stanley Cup

1943–44 Montreal Canadiens

=== Players ===
Centres

- 10 Herbert Buddy O'Connor
- 11 Ray Getliffe
- 16 Elmer Lach
- 17 Fern Majeau

Wingers

- 6 Hector Toe Blake (Captain)
- 8 Gerry Heffernan
- 9 Maurice "Rocket" Richard
- 12 Erwin Murph Chamberlain
- 14 Phil Watson
- 21 Bob Fillion

Defencemen

- 2 Mike McMahon, Sr.
- 3 Emile "Butch" Bouchard
- 4 Leo Lamoureux
- 8 Glen Harmon

Goaltenders

1 Bill Durnan

=== Coaching and administrative staff ===
- Donat Raymond (President/Owner), Dalton Coleman (Vice President/Owner)
- Len Peto (Director), Tommy Gorman (Manager)
- Dick Irvin Sr, (Coach)
- Ernie Cook (Trainer)&, Hector Dubois (Asst. Trainer)&.
- William Northey (Vice President/Owner) was missing from team picture, and Stanley Cup.

=== Stanley Cup engraving ===
- Trainer Ernie Cook and Hector Dubois were included on the team picture in 1944, 1946. However, their names were not engraved on the Cup. When the Stanley Cup was redesigned during the 1957–58 season, Cook was added to the cup in 1944, but not to the 1946 team. Dubois was not added to 1944, 1946 teams. Dubois would later have his name on the Stanley Cup 6 times 1953–56–57–58–59–60.
- In 1944, Tommy Gorman became the only Manager to win 4 Stanley Cups with 4 different teams. 1920–21–23 Ottawa Senators, 1934 Chicago Black Hawks, 1935 Montreal Maroons and 1944 Montreal Canadiens. He would retire as a champion after winning one more cup with the Canadiens in 1946.

Spelling mistakes

- Bill Durnan's name was misspelled as BILL DURMAN. The first "N" was engraved as an "M". The mistake was corrected in 1992–93 when the Replica Cup was created.
- Gerald "Gerry" Heffernan won only 1 Stanley Cup in his career in 1944. However, his name is spelled differently on each of the 3 rings of the 1944 Canadiens
- On the original ring in 1944 as GERALD HEFFERNAN
- On the redesigned ring created during the 1957–58 season as JERRY HEFFERNAN
- On the Replica ring created in 1992–93 as GERRY HEFFERNAN

== See also ==
- 1943–44 NHL season
- 1943–44 Chicago Black Hawks season
- 1943–44 Montreal Canadiens season

== References and notes ==
- Diamond, Dan (2000). Total Stanley Cup. Toronto: Total Sports Canada. ISBN 978-1-892129-07-9.
- Podnieks, Andrew; Hockey Hall of Fame (2004). Lord Stanley's Cup. Bolton, Ont.: Fenn Pub. pp 12, 50. ISBN 978-1-55168-261-7

Preceded by Detroit Red Wings; 1943	Montreal Canadiens; Stanley Cup champions 1944	Succeeded by Toronto Maple Leafs; 1945
