= 1943–44 Boston Bruins season =

NHL team season

1943–44 Boston Bruins
- League: 5th NHL
- 1943–44 record: 19–26–5
- Home record: 15–8–2
- Road record: 4–18–3
- Goals for: 223
- Goals against: 268

Team information
- General manager: Art Ross
- Coach: Art Ross
- Captain: Dit Clapper
- Arena: Boston Garden

Team leaders
- Goals: Herb Cain (36)
- Assists: Herb Cain (46)
- Points: Herb Cain (82)
- Penalty minutes: Bep Guidolin (58)
- Wins: Bert Gardiner (17)
- Goals against average: Bert Gardiner (5.17)

The 1943–44 Boston Bruins season was the Bruins' 20th season in the NHL. The Bruins failed to qualify for the playoffs for the first time since the 1933–34 season.

== Regular season ==
=== Final standings ===
National Hockey League
		GP	W	L	T	GF	GA	DIFF	Pts
1	Montreal Canadiens	50	38	5	7	234	109	+125	83
2	Detroit Red Wings	50	26	18	6	214	177	+37	58
3	Toronto Maple Leafs	50	23	23	4	214	174	+40	50
4	Chicago Black Hawks	50	22	23	5	178	187	−9	49
5	Boston Bruins	50	19	26	5	223	268	−45	43
6	New York Rangers	50	6	39	5	162	310	−148	17

=== Record vs. opponents ===
1943–44 NHL Records
Team	BOS	CHI	DET	MTL	NYR	TOR
Boston	—	5–5	1–7–2	3–5–2	7–2–1	3–7
Chicago	5–5	—	5–5	0–8–2	7–1–2	5–4–1
Detroit	7–1–2	5–5	—	0–9–1	8–1–1	6–2–2
Montreal	5–3–2	8–0–2	9–0–1	—	9–0–1	7–2–1
New York	2–7–1	1–7–2	1–8–1	0–9–1	—	2–8
Toronto	7–3	4–5–1	2–6–2	2–7–1	8–2	—

== Schedule and results ==
1943–44 regular season
October

Game	Result	Date	Score	Opponent	Record
1	T	October 30, 1943	2–2	@ Montreal Canadiens (1943–44)	0–0–1

November

Game	Result	Date	Score	Opponent	Record
2	W	November 6, 1943	5–2	@ Toronto Maple Leafs (1943–44)	1–0–1
3	L	November 7, 1943	4–6	@ Detroit Red Wings (1943–44)	1–1–1
4	L	November 11, 1943	4–6	@ Chicago Black Hawks (1943–44)	1–2–1
5	W	November 13, 1943	6–2	@ New York Rangers (1943–44)	2–2–1
6	T	November 16, 1943	2–2	Montreal Canadiens (1943–44)	2–2–2
7	L	November 18, 1943	3–7	@ Chicago Black Hawks (1943–44)	2–3–2
8	L	November 21, 1943	4–13	@ Montreal Canadiens (1943–44)	2–4–2
9	W	November 23, 1943	8–5	Toronto Maple Leafs (1943–44)	3–4–2
10	W	November 25, 1943	6–2	New York Rangers (1943–44)	4–4–2
11	L	November 27, 1943	4–7	@ Toronto Maple Leafs (1943–44)	4–5–2
12	L	November 28, 1943	4–5	@ Chicago Black Hawks (1943–44)	4–6–2
13	W	November 30, 1943	6–5	Chicago Black Hawks (1943–44)	5–6–2

December

Game	Result	Date	Score	Opponent	Record
14	W	December 5, 1943	5–4	Montreal Canadiens (1943–44)	6–6–2
15	T	December 7, 1943	6–6	Detroit Red Wings (1943–44)	6–6–3
16	W	December 11, 1943	9–6	New York Rangers (1943–44)	7–6–3
17	L	December 12, 1943	4–6	@ New York Rangers (1943–44)	7–7–3
18	W	December 14, 1943	4–3	Chicago Black Hawks (1943–44)	8–7–3
19	L	December 19, 1943	1–3	@ Montreal Canadiens (1943–44)	8–8–3
20	W	December 21, 1943	8–5	Toronto Maple Leafs (1943–44)	9–8–3
21	T	December 26, 1943	4–4	@ Detroit Red Wings (1943–44)	9–8–4
22	W	December 28, 1943	5–2	Detroit Red Wings (1943–44)	10–8–4

January

Game	Result	Date	Score	Opponent	Record
23	L	January 1, 1944	2–5	Toronto Maple Leafs (1943–44)	10–9–4
24	W	January 2, 1944	13–3	@ New York Rangers (1943–44)	11–9–4
25	W	January 4, 1944	6–4	Chicago Black Hawks (1943–44)	12–9–4
26	L	January 8, 1944	3–12	@ Toronto Maple Leafs (1943–44)	12–10–4
27	W	January 15, 1944	7–5	New York Rangers (1943–44)	13–10–4
28	L	January 16, 1944	6–8	@ New York Rangers (1943–44)	13–11–4
29	L	January 18, 1944	2–7	Toronto Maple Leafs (1943–44)	13–12–4
30	L	January 22, 1944	2–6	@ Montreal Canadiens (1943–44)	13–13–4
31	L	January 23, 1944	1–4	Montreal Canadiens (1943–44)	13–14–4
32	L	January 25, 1944	3–6	Detroit Red Wings (1943–44)	13–15–4
33	L	January 29, 1944	1–6	@ Detroit Red Wings (1943–44)	13–16–4

February

Game	Result	Date	Score	Opponent	Record
34	L	February 1, 1944	0–2	Chicago Black Hawks (1943–44)	13–17–4
35	W	February 5, 1944	7–2	New York Rangers (1943–44)	14–17–4
36	W	February 8, 1944	3–0	Montreal Canadiens (1943–44)	15–17–4
37	W	February 10, 1944	5–4	@ Chicago Black Hawks (1943–44)	16–17–4
38	L	February 13, 1944	1–4	Detroit Red Wings (1943–44)	16–18–4
39	L	February 19, 1944	4–10	@ Toronto Maple Leafs (1943–44)	16–19–4
40	L	February 20, 1944	5–6	@ Detroit Red Wings (1943–44)	16–20–4
41	L	February 26, 1944	2–10	@ Montreal Canadiens (1943–44)	16–21–4
42	L	February 29, 1944	3–7	Toronto Maple Leafs (1943–44)	16–22–4

March

Game	Result	Date	Score	Opponent	Record
43	L	March 2, 1944	2–4	@ Chicago Black Hawks (1943–44)	16–23–4
44	W	March 4, 1944	10–9	New York Rangers (1943–44)	17–23–4
45	T	March 5, 1944	4–4	@ New York Rangers (1943–44)	17–23–5
46	L	March 7, 1944	4–8	Detroit Red Wings (1943–44)	17–24–5
47	W	March 12, 1944	6–5	Montreal Canadiens (1943–44)	18–24–5
48	W	March 14, 1944	6–4	Chicago Black Hawks (1943–44)	19–24–5
49	L	March 16, 1944	9–10	@ Detroit Red Wings (1943–44)	19–25–5
50	L	March 18, 1944	2–10	@ Toronto Maple Leafs (1943–44)	19–26–5

Legend: Win (2 points) Loss (0 points) Tie (1 point)

== Player statistics ==
=== Regular season ===
Scoring

Player	Pos	GP	G	A	Pts	PIM
Herb Cain	LW	48	36	46	82	4
Bill Cowley	C	36	30	41	71	12
Art Jackson	C	49	28	41	69	8
Buzz Boll	LW	39	19	25	44	2
Norm Calladine	C	49	16	27	43	8
Bep Guidolin	LW	47	17	25	42	58
Busher Jackson	LW	42	11	21	32	25
Dit Clapper	RW/D	50	6	25	31	13
Pat Egan	D	25	11	13	24	55
Jack Crawford	D	34	4	16	20	8
Don Gallinger	C	23	13	5	18	6
Flash Hollett	D	25	9	7	16	4
Russ Kopak	C	24	7	9	16	0
Alan Rittinger	W	19	3	7	10	0
Aldo Palazzari	RW	24	6	3	9	4
Guy Labrie	D	15	2	7	9	2
Tom Brennan	RW	11	2	1	3	2
Chuck Scherza	LW/C	9	1	1	2	6
Oscar Aubuchon	LW	9	1	0	1	0
Clarence Schmidt	RW	7	1	0	1	2
Irwin Boyd	RW	5	0	1	1	0
Bert Gardiner	G	41	0	1	1	0
George Abbott	G	1	0	0	0	0
Maurice Courteau	G	6	0	0	0	0
Ab DeMarco	C	3	0	0	0	0
Jimmy Franks	G	1	0	0	0	0
Benny Grant	G	1	0	0	0	0
Otto Schmidt	D	2	0	0	0	0
John Wilkinson	D	9	0	0	0	6

Goaltending

Player	MIN	GP	W	L	T	GA	GAA	SO
Bert Gardiner	2460	41	17	19	5	212	5.17	1
Maurice Courteau	360	6	2	4	0	33	5.50	0
George Abbott	60	1	0	1	0	7	7.00	0
Jimmy Franks	60	1	0	1	0	6	6.00	0
Benny Grant	60	1	0	1	0	10	10.00	0
Team:	3000	50	19	26	5	268	5.36	1

Note:

Pos = Position;GP = Games played; G = Goals; A = Assists; Pts = Points; PIM = Penalty minutes; +/- = Plus/minus; PPG = Power-play goals; SHG = Short-handed goals; GWG = Game-winning goals
Pos = Position;GP = Games played; Min, TOI = Minutes played; W = Wins; L = Losses; T,T/OT = Ties; OTL = Overtime losses; GA = Goals-against; GAA = Goals-against average; SO = Shutouts; SA = Shots against; SV = Shots saved;SV% = Save percentage;

== See also ==
- 1943–44 NHL season
