= 1943–44 Chicago Black Hawks season =

NHL ice hockey team season

1943–44 Chicago Black Hawks
- O'Brien Trophy winners
- League: 4th NHL
- 1943–44 record: 22–23–5
- Home record: 15–6–4
- Road record: 7–17–1
- Goals for: 178
- Goals against: 187

Team information
- General manager: Bill Tobin
- Coach: Paul Thompson
- Captain: Doug Bentley
- Arena: Chicago Stadium

Team leaders
- Goals: Doug Bentley (38)
- Assists: Clint Smith (49)
- Points: Doug Bentley (77)
- Penalty minutes: Earl Seibert (40)
- Wins: Mike Karakas (12)
- Goals against average: Mike Karakas (3.04)

The 1943–44 Chicago Black Hawks season was the team's 18th season in the NHL, and they were coming off a 5th-place finish in 1942–43, failing to qualify for the playoffs.

The Black Hawks would once again finish just under .500, with a 22–23–5 record, good for 49 points, and 4th place in the NHL. The Hawks 178 goals would rank them just ahead of the New York Rangers for 5th in the league, while the 187 goals they let in ranked 4th. The team would qualify for the playoffs, as they would have 6 more points than the 5th place Boston Bruins.

Doug Bentley would have another huge season, breaking the Black Hawks record for points in a season, which he set in the 1942–43 season, by earning 77 points, along with a club record 38 goals, which led the NHL. Clint Smith, who the Black Hawks acquired from the Rangers in the off-season, would set a club record with 49 assists, and win the Lady Byng Trophy. Bill Mosienko would have a break out season with 32 goals and 70 points. Earl Seibert would anchor the defense, leading all defensemen with 33 points and had a team high 40 penalty minutes.

In goal, the Hawks would begin the season with Hec Highton in goal, however, after a 10–14–0 start, and a GAA of 4.50, the Hawks would trade him to the Providence Reds of the American Hockey League for former Hawks goaltender Mike Karakas. Karakas would put together a 12–9–5 record with a 3.04 GAA, helping Chicago clinch the final playoff spot.

The Black Hawks would have a first-round playoff date with the second place Detroit Red Wings, who finished 9 points better than Chicago in the regular season, in a best-of-seven series. The Hawks and Wings would split the opening two games in Detroit, and Chicago would take a 2–1 series lead by shutting out the Red Wings in game three. The Black Hawks would dominate game four, winning 7–1 and take a commanding 3–1 series lead. Chicago would then complete the upset in game five, defeating the Wings 5–2 in Detroit, and earn a spot in the Stanley Cup finals for the first time since 1938. Their opponent would be the Montreal Canadiens, who dominated the NHL with 83 points, 34 points better than the Hawks in the regular season. Chicago would prove to be no match for the powerful Canadiens, as they would sweep the Black Hawks, including a Stanley Cup clinching win in overtime in the 4th game, to win the 1944 Stanley Cup.

== Season standings ==
National Hockey League
		GP	W	L	T	GF	GA	DIFF	Pts
1	Montreal Canadiens	50	38	5	7	234	109	+125	83
2	Detroit Red Wings	50	26	18	6	214	177	+37	58
3	Toronto Maple Leafs	50	23	23	4	214	174	+40	50
4	Chicago Black Hawks	50	22	23	5	178	187	−9	49
5	Boston Bruins	50	19	26	5	223	268	−45	43
6	New York Rangers	50	6	39	5	162	310	−148	17

=== Record vs. opponents ===
1943–44 NHL Records
Team	BOS	CHI	DET	MTL	NYR	TOR
Boston	—	5–5	1–7–2	3–5–2	7–2–1	3–7
Chicago	5–5	—	5–5	0–8–2	7–1–2	5–4–1
Detroit	7–1–2	5–5	—	0–9–1	8–1–1	6–2–2
Montreal	5–3–2	8–0–2	9–0–1	—	9–0–1	7–2–1
New York	2–7–1	1–7–2	1–8–1	0–9–1	—	2–8
Toronto	7–3	4–5–1	2–6–2	2–7–1	8–2	—

== Schedule and results ==
=== Regular season ===
1943–44 regular season
October

Game	Date	Visitor	Score	Home	Record	Points
1	October 31	Toronto Maple Leafs	4–1	Chicago Black Hawks	0–1–0	0

November

Game	Date	Visitor	Score	Home	Record	Points
2	November 4	Montreal Canadiens	5–3	Chicago Black Hawks	0–2–0	0
3	November 6	Chicago Black Hawks	4–3	New York Rangers	1–2–0	2
4	November 7	Chicago Black Hawks	1–5	Montreal Canadiens	1–3–0	2
5	November 11	Boston Bruins	4–6	Chicago Black Hawks	2–3–0	4
6	November 13	Chicago Black Hawks	4–1	Toronto Maple Leafs	3–3–0	6
7	November 14	New York Rangers	5–10	Chicago Black Hawks	4–3–0	8
8	November 18	Boston Bruins	3–7	Chicago Black Hawks	5–3–0	10
9	November 21	Chicago Black Hawks	2–5	Detroit Red Wings	5–4–0	10
10	November 25	Detroit Red Wings	3–4	Chicago Black Hawks	6–4–0	12
11	November 28	Boston Bruins	4–5	Chicago Black Hawks	7–4–0	14
12	November 30	Chicago Black Hawks	5–6	Boston Bruins	7–5–0	14

December

Game	Date	Visitor	Score	Home	Record	Points
13	December 2	Chicago Black Hawks	2–6	Montreal Canadiens	7–6–0	14
14	December 5	New York Rangers	6–7	Chicago Black Hawks	8–6–0	16
15	December 12	Toronto Maple Leafs	2–3	Chicago Black Hawks	9–6–0	18
16	December 14	Chicago Black Hawks	3–4	Boston Bruins	9–7–0	18
17	December 18	Chicago Black Hawks	4–8	Toronto Maple Leafs	9–8–0	18
18	December 19	Toronto Maple Leafs	5–2	Chicago Black Hawks	9–9–0	18
19	December 22	Detroit Red Wings	1–7	Chicago Black Hawks	10–9–0	20
20	December 25	Chicago Black Hawks	1–5	Montreal Canadiens	10–10–0	20
21	December 26	Chicago Black Hawks	6–7	New York Rangers	10–11–0	20

January

Game	Date	Visitor	Score	Home	Record	Points
22	January 1	Montreal Canadiens	4–0	Chicago Black Hawks	10–12–0	20
23	January 4	Chicago Black Hawks	4–6	Boston Bruins	10–13–0	20
24	January 6	Chicago Black Hawks	1–6	Toronto Maple Leafs	10–14–0	20
25	January 9	Chicago Black Hawks	2–4	Detroit Red Wings	10–15–0	20
26	January 13	Chicago Black Hawks	5–2	New York Rangers	11–15–0	22
27	January 16	Montreal Canadiens	1–1	Chicago Black Hawks	11–15–1	23
28	January 20	Chicago Black Hawks	3–4	Detroit Red Wings	11–16–1	23
29	January 23	Toronto Maple Leafs	3–5	Chicago Black Hawks	12–16–1	25
30	January 27	New York Rangers	4–6	Chicago Black Hawks	13–16–1	27
31	January 29	Chicago Black Hawks	4–3	Toronto Maple Leafs	14–16–1	29
32	January 30	Detroit Red Wings	2–3	Chicago Black Hawks	15–16–1	31

February

Game	Date	Visitor	Score	Home	Record	Points
33	February 1	Chicago Black Hawks	2–0	Boston Bruins	16–16–1	33
34	February 5	Chicago Black Hawks	1–5	Montreal Canadiens	16–17–1	33
35	February 6	Chicago Black Hawks	4–4	New York Rangers	16–17–2	34
36	February 10	Boston Bruins	5–4	Chicago Black Hawks	16–18–2	34
37	February 13	Montreal Canadiens	2–2	Chicago Black Hawks	16–18–3	35
38	February 20	Toronto Maple Leafs	0–0	Chicago Black Hawks	16–18–4	36
39	February 22	Chicago Black Hawks	8–4	New York Rangers	17–18–4	38
40	February 26	Chicago Black Hawks	3–2	Toronto Maple Leafs	18–18–4	40
41	February 27	New York Rangers	2–4	Chicago Black Hawks	19–18–4	42

March

Game	Date	Visitor	Score	Home	Record	Points
42	March 2	Boston Bruins	2–4	Chicago Black Hawks	20–18–4	44
43	March 4	Chicago Black Hawks	2–6	Detroit Red Wings	20–19–4	44
44	March 5	Detroit Red Wings	1–6	Chicago Black Hawks	21–19–4	46
45	March 9	Montreal Canadiens	3–2	Chicago Black Hawks	21–20–4	46
46	March 12	New York Rangers	4–4	Chicago Black Hawks	21–20–5	47
47	March 14	Chicago Black Hawks	4–6	Boston Bruins	21–21–5	47
48	March 16	Chicago Black Hawks	2–3	Montreal Canadiens	21–22–5	47
49	March 18	Chicago Black Hawks	3–6	Detroit Red Wings	21–23–5	47
50	March 19	Detroit Red Wings	0–2	Chicago Black Hawks	22–23–5	49

Legend: Win (2 points) Loss (0 points) Tie (1 point)

== Playoffs ==
=== Black Hawks 4, Red Wings 1 ===
==== NHL semi-finals ====
===== (2) Detroit Red Wings vs. (4) Chicago Black Hawks =====
March 21	Chicago Black Hawks	2 – 1	Detroit Red Wings	Detroit Olympia	Recap
Mosienko (1) – (Cooper, Smith) – 7:12; D. Bentley (1) – (Smith)		First period	12:18 – pp – Howe (1) – (Carveth)
No scoring		Second period	No scoring
No scoring		Third period	No scoring
Karakas (1-0)		Goalie stats	Dion (0-1)

March 23	Chicago Black Hawks	1 – 4	Detroit Red Wings	Detroit Olympia	Recap
No scoring		First period	No scoring
No scoring		Second period	3:00 – Carveth (1) – (Howe); 18:40 – pp – Howe (2) – (Unassisted)
Allen (1) – (Dahlstrom, Johnson) – 16:06		Third period	0:21 – Grosso (1) – (Unassisted); 16:06 – Bruneteau (1) – (Howe)
Karakas (1-1)		Goalie stats	Dion (1-1)

March 26	Detroit Red Wings	0 – 2	Chicago Black Hawks	Chicago Stadium	Recap
No scoring		First period	11:06 – Cooper (1) – (Unassisted)
No scoring		Second period	No scoring
No scoring		Third period	11:30 – Smith (1) – (Unassisted)
Dion (1-2)		Goalie stats	Karakas (2-1)

March 28	Detroit Red Wings	1 – 7	Chicago Black Hawks	Chicago Stadium	Recap
Liscombe (1) – (Armstrong, Bruneteau) – 6:00		First period	4:44 – D. Bentley (2) – (Smith, Mosienko); 11:09 – pp – Mosienko (2) – (Siebert, Allen); 16:54 – Smith (2) – (D. Bentley)
No scoring		Second period	1:42 – Smith (2) – (D. Bentley, Gottselig); 15:30 – D. Bentley (3) – (Unassisted); 19:18 – D. Bentley (4) – (Unassisted)
No scoring		Third period	19:57 – Purpur (1) – (Unassisted)
Dion (1-3)		Goalie stats	Karakas (3-1)

March 30	Chicago Black Hawks	5 – 2	Detroit Red Wings	Detroit Olympia	Recap
D. Bentley (5) – pp – (Allen, Siebert) – 18:23		First period	6:59 – Quackenbush (1) – (Bruneteau)
No scoring		Second period	No scoring
Gottselig (1) – (Smith, Wiebe) – 3:37; D. Bentley (6) – (Johnson) – 8:10; D. Bentley (7) – (Smith) – 12:30; Allen (2) – (Purpur, Dahlstrom) – 18:56		Third period	8:40 – Carveth (2) – (Armstrong)
Karakas (4-1)		Goalie stats	Dion (1-4)

Chicago wins series 4 – 1

=== Canadiens 4, Black Hawks 0 ===
==== Stanley Cup finals ====
===== (1) Montreal Canadiens vs. (4) Chicago Black Hawks =====
April 4	Chicago Black Hawks	1 – 5	Montreal Canadiens	Montreal Forum	Recap
No scoring		First period	8:37 – Watson (2) – (Unassisted)
Smith (4) – pp – (D. Bentley, Mosienko) – 10:11		Second period	6:35 – pp – Blake (5) – (Richard, Lach); 10:58 – Getliffe (4) – (Heffernan, O'Connor)
No scoring		Third period	4:47 – Chamberlain (5) – (Watson, Bouchard); 18:07 – Getliffe (5) – (Unassisted)
Karakas (4-2)		Goalie stats	Durnan (5-1)

April 6	Montreal Canadiens	3 – 1	Chicago Black Hawks	Chicago Stadium	Recap
No scoring		First period	No scoring
Richard (8) – (Lach, Blake) – 13:00		Second period	No scoring
Richard (9) – (Lamoureux) – 12:16; Richard (10) – (Lach) – 15:33		Third period	19:59 – Harms (1) – (Smith, Allen)
Durnan (6-1)		Goalie stats	Karakas (4-3)

April 9	Montreal Canadiens	3 – 2	Chicago Black Hawks	Chicago Stadium	Recap
No scoring		First period	5:14 – Allen (3) – (Wiebe)
Blake (6) – (Richard) – 2:02		Second period	No scoring
McMahon (1) – (Unassisted) – 5:47; Watson (3) – (Getliffe) – 6:42		Third period	4:16 – Harms (2) – (Johnson)
Durnan (7-1)		Goalie stats	Karakas (4-4)

April 13	Chicago Black Hawks	4 – 5	OT	Montreal Canadiens	Montreal Forum	Recap
Allen (4) – (Dahlstrom) – 5:12		First period		8:48 – Lach (1) – (Blake)
Harms (3) – pp – (Dahlstrom, Allen) – 7:30; Allen (5) – pp – (Smith, D. Bentley) – 9:12; D. Bentley (8) – (Smith) – 10:09		Second period		No scoring
No scoring		Third period		10:02 – Lach (2) – (Blake); 16:05 – Richard (11) – (Blake); 17:20 – Richard (12) – (Blake, Bouchard)
No scoring		First overtime period		9:12 – Blake (7) – (Bouchard)
Karakas (4-5)		Goalie stats		Durnan (8-1)

Montreal wins series 4 – 0

== Season stats ==
=== Scoring leaders ===
Player	GP	G	A	Pts	PIM
Doug Bentley	50	38	39	77	22
Clint Smith	50	23	49	72	4
Bill Mosienko	50	32	38	70	10
Cully Dahlstrom	50	20	22	42	8
George Allen	45	17	24	41	36

=== Goaltending ===
Player	GP	TOI	W	L	T	GA	SO	GAA
Mike Karakas	26	1560	12	9	5	79	3	3.04
Hec Highton	24	1440	10	14	0	108	0	4.50

== Playoff stats ==
=== Scoring leaders ===
Player	GP	G	A	Pts	PIM
Doug Bentley	9	8	4	12	4
Clint Smith	9	4	8	12	0
George Allen	9	5	4	9	8
Bill Mosienko	8	2	2	4	6
Cully Dahlstrom	9	0	4	4	6

=== Goaltending ===
Player	GP	TOI	W	L	GA	SO	GAA
Mike Karakas	9	549	4	5	24	1	2.62
