= 1943–44 Detroit Red Wings season =

National Hockey League team season

1943–44 Detroit Red Wings
- League: 2nd NHL
- 1943–44 record: 26–18–6
- Home record: 18–5–2
- Road record: 8–13–4
- Goals for: 214
- Goals against: 177

Team information
- General manager: Jack Adams
- Coach: Jack Adams
- Captain: Mud Bruneteau and Flash Hollett
- Arena: Detroit Olympia

Team leaders
- Goals: Carl Liscombe (36)
- Assists: Carl Liscombe (37)
- Points: Carl Liscombe (73)
- Penalty minutes: Harold Jackson (76)
- Wins: Connie Dion (17)
- Goals against average: Normie Smith (3.00)

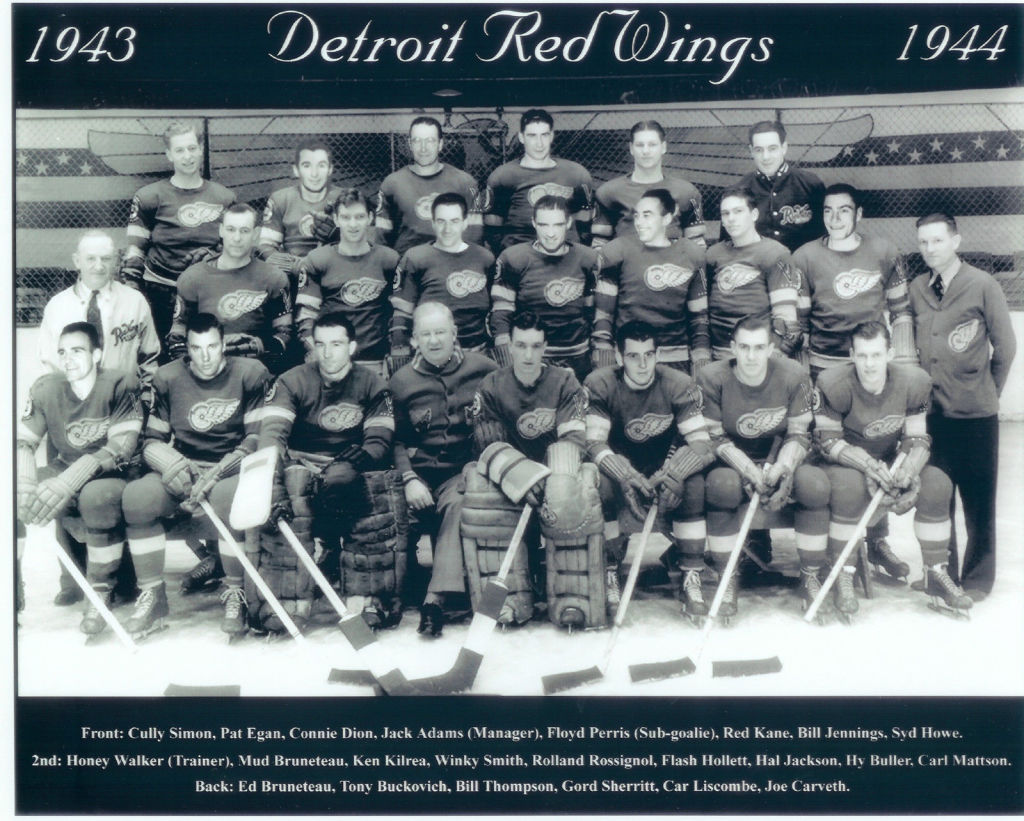
The 1943–44 Red Wings

The 1943–44 Detroit Red Wings season was the 18th season of the Detroit NHL franchise. The Red Wings qualified for the playoffs, losing in the first round to the Chicago Black Hawks.

== Regular season ==
=== Final standings ===
National Hockey League
		GP	W	L	T	GF	GA	DIFF	Pts
1	Montreal Canadiens	50	38	5	7	234	109	+125	83
2	Detroit Red Wings	50	26	18	6	214	177	+37	58
3	Toronto Maple Leafs	50	23	23	4	214	174	+40	50
4	Chicago Black Hawks	50	22	23	5	178	187	−9	49
5	Boston Bruins	50	19	26	5	223	268	−45	43
6	New York Rangers	50	6	39	5	162	310	−148	17

=== Record vs. opponents ===
1943–44 NHL Records
Team	BOS	CHI	DET	MTL	NYR	TOR
Boston	—	5–5	1–7–2	3–5–2	7–2–1	3–7
Chicago	5–5	—	5–5	0–8–2	7–1–2	5–4–1
Detroit	7–1–2	5–5	—	0–9–1	8–1–1	6–2–2
Montreal	5–3–2	8–0–2	9–0–1	—	9–0–1	7–2–1
New York	2–7–1	1–7–2	1–8–1	0–9–1	—	2–8
Toronto	7–3	4–5–1	2–6–2	2–7–1	8–2	—

== Schedule and results ==
1943–44 regular season
October

Game	Result	Date	Score	Opponent	Record
1	W	October 31, 1943	8–3	New York Rangers (1943–44)	1–0–0

November

Game	Result	Date	Score	Opponent	Record
2	T	November 4, 1943	5–5	Toronto Maple Leafs (1943–44)	1–0–1
3	W	November 7, 1943	6–4	Boston Bruins (1943–44)	2–0–1
4	T	November 11, 1943	2–2	@ Toronto Maple Leafs (1943–44)	2–0–2
5	L	November 13, 1943	1–4	@ Montreal Canadiens (1943–44)	2–1–2
6	L	November 14, 1943	0–2	Montreal Canadiens (1943–44)	2–2–2
7	W	November 18, 1943	3–1	@ New York Rangers (1943–44)	3–2–2
8	W	November 21, 1943	5–2	Chicago Black Hawks (1943–44)	4–2–2
9	L	November 25, 1943	3–4	@ Chicago Black Hawks (1943–44)	4–3–2
10	W	November 28, 1943	6–4	Toronto Maple Leafs (1943–44)	5–3–2

December

Game	Result	Date	Score	Opponent	Record
11	L	December 2, 1943	5–6	@ Toronto Maple Leafs (1943–44)	5–4–2
12	L	December 4, 1943	2–8	@ Montreal Canadiens (1943–44)	5–5–2
13	T	December 7, 1943	6–6	@ Boston Bruins (1943–44)	5–5–3
14	L	December 12, 1943	1–5	Montreal Canadiens (1943–44)	5–6–3
15	W	December 16, 1943	4–1	@ Toronto Maple Leafs (1943–44)	6–6–3
16	L	December 19, 1943	2–6	@ New York Rangers (1943–44)	6–7–3
17	L	December 22, 1943	1–7	@ Chicago Black Hawks (1943–44)	6–8–3
18	W	December 23, 1943	5–3	New York Rangers (1943–44)	7–8–3
19	T	December 26, 1943	4–4	Boston Bruins (1943–44)	7–8–4
20	L	December 28, 1943	2–5	@ Boston Bruins (1943–44)	7–9–4
21	L	December 30, 1943	3–8	@ Montreal Canadiens (1943–44)	7–10–4

January

Game	Result	Date	Score	Opponent	Record
22	L	January 2, 1944	2–5	Montreal Canadiens (1943–44)	7–11–4
23	W	January 6, 1944	5–0	@ New York Rangers (1943–44)	8–11–4
24	W	January 9, 1944	4–2	Chicago Black Hawks (1943–44)	9–11–4
25	T	January 13, 1944	2–2	@ Montreal Canadiens (1943–44)	9–11–5
26	W	January 15, 1944	6–4	@ Toronto Maple Leafs (1943–44)	10–11–5
27	W	January 16, 1944	4–1	Toronto Maple Leafs (1943–44)	11–11–5
28	W	January 20, 1944	4–3	Chicago Black Hawks (1943–44)	12–11–5
29	W	January 23, 1944	15–0	New York Rangers (1943–44)	13–11–5
30	W	January 25, 1944	6–3	@ Boston Bruins (1943–44)	14–11–5
31	W	January 29, 1944	6–1	Boston Bruins (1943–44)	15–11–5
32	L	January 30, 1944	2–3	@ Chicago Black Hawks (1943–44)	15–12–5

February

Game	Result	Date	Score	Opponent	Record
33	W	February 3, 1944	12–2	New York Rangers (1943–44)	16–12–5
34	L	February 5, 1944	1–3	@ Toronto Maple Leafs (1943–44)	16–13–5
35	W	February 6, 1944	3–2	Toronto Maple Leafs (1943–44)	17–13–5
36	W	February 10, 1944	8–3	@ New York Rangers (1943–44)	18–13–5
37	W	February 13, 1944	4–1	@ Boston Bruins (1943–44)	19–13–5
38	L	February 17, 1944	2–3	Montreal Canadiens (1943–44)	19–14–5
39	W	February 20, 1944	6–5	Boston Bruins (1943–44)	20–14–5
40	T	February 24, 1944	3–3	@ New York Rangers (1943–44)	20–14–6
41	L	February 27, 1944	1–5	Montreal Canadiens (1943–44)	20–15–6

March

Game	Result	Date	Score	Opponent	Record
42	W	March 2, 1944	6–5	New York Rangers (1943–44)	21–15–6
43	W	March 4, 1944	6–2	Chicago Black Hawks (1943–44)	22–15–6
44	L	March 5, 1944	1–6	@ Chicago Black Hawks (1943–44)	22–16–6
45	W	March 7, 1944	8–4	@ Boston Bruins (1943–44)	23–16–6
46	L	March 11, 1944	3–4	@ Montreal Canadiens (1943–44)	23–17–6
47	W	March 12, 1944	4–1	Toronto Maple Leafs (1943–44)	24–17–6
48	W	March 16, 1944	10–9	Boston Bruins (1943–44)	25–17–6
49	W	March 18, 1944	6–3	Chicago Black Hawks (1943–44)	26–17–6
50	L	March 19, 1944	0–2	@ Chicago Black Hawks (1943–44)	26–18–6

Legend: Win (2 points) Loss (0 points) Tie (1 point)

== Player statistics ==
=== Regular season ===
Scoring

Player	Pos	GP	G	A	Pts	PIM
Carl Liscombe	LW	50	36	37	73	17
Syd Howe	C/LW	46	32	28	60	6
Joe Carveth	RW	46	21	35	56	6
Mud Bruneteau	RW	39	35	18	53	4
Don Grosso	LW/C	42	16	31	47	13
Adam Brown	LW	50	24	18	42	56
Murray Armstrong	C	28	12	22	34	4
Harold Jackson	D	50	7	12	19	76
Pat Egan	D	23	4	15	19	40
Flash Hollett	D	27	6	12	18	34
Bill Quackenbush	D	43	4	14	18	6
Bill Jennings	RW	33	6	11	17	10
Cully Simon	D	46	3	7	10	52
Bill Thomson	C/RW	5	2	2	4	0
Ken Kilrea	LW	14	1	3	4	0
Nakina Smith	C	10	1	2	3	0
Hy Buller	D	7	0	3	3	4
Billy Reay	C	2	2	0	2	0
Carl Smith	RW	7	1	1	2	2
Jud McAtee	LW	1	0	2	2	0
Bernie Ruelle	LW	2	1	0	1	0
Frank Bennett	LW/D	7	0	1	1	2
Eddie Bruneteau	RW	2	0	1	1	0
Tony Bukovich	LW/C	3	0	1	1	0
Roly Rossignol	RW	1	0	1	1	0
Lude Check	LW	1	0	0	0	0
Connie Dion	G	26	0	0	0	0
Jimmy Franks	G	17	0	0	0	0
Francis Kane	D	2	0	0	0	0
Harry Lumley	G	2	0	0	0	0
Vic Lynn	LW/D	3	0	0	0	4
John Sherf	LW	8	0	0	0	6
Gordon Sherritt	D	8	0	0	0	12
Normie Smith	G	5	0	0	0	0
Rudy Zunich	D	2	0	0	0	2

Goaltending

Player	MIN	GP	W	L	T	GA	GAA	SO
Connie Dion	1560	26	17	7	2	80	3.08	1
Jimmy Franks	1020	17	6	8	3	69	4.06	1
Normie Smith	300	5	3	1	1	15	3.00	0
Harry Lumley	120	2	0	2	0	13	6.50	0
Team:	3000	50	26	18	6	177	3.54	2

=== Playoffs ===
Scoring

Player	Pos	GP	G	A	Pts	PIM
Syd Howe	C/LW	5	2	2	4	0
Joe Carveth	RW	5	2	1	3	8
Mud Bruneteau	RW	5	1	2	3	2
Murray Armstrong	C	5	0	2	2	0
Don Grosso	LW/C	5	1	0	1	0
Carl Liscombe	LW	5	1	0	1	2
Bill Quackenbush	D	2	1	0	1	0
Adam Brown	LW	5	0	0	0	8
Connie Dion	G	5	0	0	0	0
Flash Hollett	D	5	0	0	0	6
Harold Jackson	D	5	0	0	0	11
Bill Jennings	RW	4	0	0	0	0
Ken Kilrea	LW	2	0	0	0	0
Cully Simon	D	5	0	0	0	2
Bill Thomson	C/RW	2	0	0	0	0

Goaltending

Player	MIN	GP	W	L	GA	GAA	SO
Connie Dion	300	5	1	4	17	3.40	0
Team:	300	5	1	4	17	3.40	0

Note: GP = Games played; G = Goals; A = Assists; Pts = Points; +/- = Plus-minus PIM = Penalty minutes; PPG = Power-play goals; SHG = Short-handed goals; GWG = Game-winning goals;
MIN = Minutes played; W = Wins; L = Losses; T = Ties; GA = Goals against; GAA = Goals-against average; SO = Shutouts;

== Awards and records ==
NHL Record: highest scoring shutout, 15–0

== See also ==
- 1943–44 NHL season
