= 1943–44 Montreal Canadiens season =

NHL hockey team season (won Stanley Cup)

1943–44 Montreal Canadiens
- Stanley Cup champions
- Prince of Wales Trophy winners
- League: 1st NHL
- 1943–44 record: 38–5–7
- Home record: 22–0–3
- Road record: 16–5–4
- Goals for: 234
- Goals against: 109

Team information
- General manager: Tommy Gorman
- Coach: Dick Irvin
- Captain: Toe Blake
- Arena: Montreal Forum

Team leaders
- Goals: Maurice Richard (32)
- Assists: Elmer Lach (48)
- Points: Elmer Lach (72)
- Penalty minutes: Mike McMahon Sr. (98)
- Wins: Bill Durnan (38)
- Goals against average: Bill Durnan (2.18)

The 1943–44 Montreal Canadiens season was the club's 35th season, 27th in the National Hockey League (NHL). The team would win the Stanley Cup for the fifth time. Bill Durnan would join the club as its new goaltender and he won the Vezina Trophy in his rookie season.

== Offseason ==
At the Habs' training camp in 1943, Canadiens manager Tommy Gorman settled on Bill Durnan as his goalie. Durnan stated that he was happy as an amateur and happy with less money if it meant avoiding the stress of the professional game. On opening night, Durnan was not yet signed. Ten minutes before the first faceoff, he spoke with Gorman and reached a deal. Durnan signed the contract and played in the game. The result was a 2–2 draw with the Boston Bruins. The rookie netminder was a few months shy of his 27th birthday.

== Regular season ==
Some of Durnan's teammates included the "Punch Line" of Elmer Lach, Rocket Richard and Toe Blake. Durnan was a key element that took Montreal back to the Stanley Cup Final after 13 years of frustration. Durnan led the league in games played, wins and goals-against average in the regular season.

=== Final standings ===
National Hockey League
		GP	W	L	T	GF	GA	DIFF	Pts
1	Montreal Canadiens	50	38	5	7	234	109	+125	83
2	Detroit Red Wings	50	26	18	6	214	177	+37	58
3	Toronto Maple Leafs	50	23	23	4	214	174	+40	50
4	Chicago Black Hawks	50	22	23	5	178	187	−9	49
5	Boston Bruins	50	19	26	5	223	268	−45	43
6	New York Rangers	50	6	39	5	162	310	−148	17

=== Record vs. opponents ===
1943–44 NHL Records
Team	BOS	CHI	DET	MTL	NYR	TOR
Boston	—	5–5	1–7–2	3–5–2	7–2–1	3–7
Chicago	5–5	—	5–5	0–8–2	7–1–2	5–4–1
Detroit	7–1–2	5–5	—	0–9–1	8–1–1	6–2–2
Montreal	5–3–2	8–0–2	9–0–1	—	9–0–1	7–2–1
New York	2–7–1	1–7–2	1–8–1	0–9–1	—	2–8
Toronto	7–3	4–5–1	2–6–2	2–7–1	8–2	—

== Schedule and results ==
1943–44 regular season
October

Game	Result	Date	Score	Opponent	Record
1	T	October 30, 1943	2–2	Boston Bruins (1943–44)	0–0–1

November

Game	Result	Date	Score	Opponent	Record
2	W	November 2, 1943	2–1	New York Rangers (1943–44)	1–0–1
3	W	November 4, 1943	5–3	@ Chicago Black Hawks (1943–44)	2–0–1
4	W	November 7, 1943	5–1	Chicago Black Hawks (1943–44)	3–0–1
5	W	November 13, 1943	4–1	Detroit Red Wings (1943–44)	4–0–1
6	W	November 14, 1943	2–0	@ Detroit Red Wings (1943–44)	5–0–1
7	T	November 16, 1943	2–2	@ Boston Bruins (1943–44)	5–0–2
8	W	November 18, 1943	5–2	Toronto Maple Leafs (1943–44)	6–0–2
9	W	November 20, 1943	7–2	@ Toronto Maple Leafs (1943–44)	7–0–2
10	W	November 21, 1943	13–4	Boston Bruins (1943–44)	8–0–2
11	W	November 27, 1943	6–3	New York Rangers (1943–44)	9–0–2
12	T	November 28, 1943	2–2	@ New York Rangers (1943–44)	9–0–3

December

Game	Result	Date	Score	Opponent	Record
13	W	December 2, 1943	6–2	Chicago Black Hawks (1943–44)	10–0–3
14	W	December 4, 1943	8–2	Detroit Red Wings (1943–44)	11–0–3
15	L	December 5, 1943	4–5	@ Boston Bruins (1943–44)	11–1–3
16	L	December 11, 1943	2–4	@ Toronto Maple Leafs (1943–44)	11–2–3
17	W	December 12, 1943	5–1	@ Detroit Red Wings (1943–44)	12–2–3
18	W	December 19, 1943	3–1	Boston Bruins (1943–44)	13–2–3
19	W	December 25, 1943	5–1	Chicago Black Hawks (1943–44)	14–2–3
20	W	December 30, 1943	8–3	Detroit Red Wings (1943–44)	15–2–3

January

Game	Result	Date	Score	Opponent	Record
21	W	January 1, 1944	4–0	@ Chicago Black Hawks (1943–44)	16–2–3
22	W	January 2, 1944	5–2	@ Detroit Red Wings (1943–44)	17–2–3
23	W	January 4, 1944	6–3	Toronto Maple Leafs (1943–44)	18–2–3
24	W	January 8, 1944	8–2	New York Rangers (1943–44)	19–2–3
25	W	January 9, 1944	6–5	@ New York Rangers (1943–44)	20–2–3
26	L	January 11, 1944	0–5	@ Toronto Maple Leafs (1943–44)	20–3–3
27	T	January 13, 1944	2–2	Detroit Red Wings (1943–44)	20–3–4
28	T	January 16, 1944	1–1	@ Chicago Black Hawks (1943–44)	20–3–5
29	W	January 22, 1944	6–2	Boston Bruins (1943–44)	21–3–5
30	W	January 23, 1944	4–1	@ Boston Bruins (1943–44)	22–3–5
31	T	January 27, 1944	2–2	Toronto Maple Leafs (1943–44)	22–3–6
32	W	January 30, 1944	5–3	@ New York Rangers (1943–44)	23–3–6

February

Game	Result	Date	Score	Opponent	Record
33	W	February 5, 1944	6–1	Chicago Black Hawks (1943–44)	24–3–6
34	L	February 8, 1944	0–3	@ Boston Bruins (1943–44)	24–4–6
35	W	February 12, 1944	3–2	@ Toronto Maple Leafs (1943–44)	25–4–6
36	T	February 13, 1944	2–2	@ Chicago Black Hawks (1943–44)	25–4–7
37	W	February 17, 1944	3–2	@ Detroit Red Wings (1943–44)	26–4–7
38	W	February 19, 1944	5–2	New York Rangers (1943–44)	27–4–7
39	W	February 20, 1944	7–2	@ New York Rangers (1943–44)	28–4–7
40	W	February 24, 1944	3–1	Toronto Maple Leafs (1943–44)	29–4–7
41	W	February 26, 1944	10–2	Boston Bruins (1943–44)	30–4–7
42	W	February 27, 1944	5–1	@ Detroit Red Wings (1943–44)	31–4–7

March

Game	Result	Date	Score	Opponent	Record
43	W	March 4, 1944	5–2	@ Toronto Maple Leafs (1943–44)	32–4–7
44	W	March 5, 1944	8–3	Toronto Maple Leafs (1943–44)	33–4–7
45	W	March 9, 1944	3–2	@ Chicago Black Hawks (1943–44)	34–4–7
46	W	March 11, 1944	4–3	Detroit Red Wings (1943–44)	35–4–7
47	L	March 12, 1944	5–6	@ Boston Bruins (1943–44)	35–5–7
48	W	March 16, 1944	3–2	Chicago Black Hawks (1943–44)	36–5–7
49	W	March 18, 1944	11–2	New York Rangers (1943–44)	37–5–7
50	W	March 19, 1944	6–1	@ New York Rangers (1943–44)	38–5–7

Legend: Win (2 points) Loss (0 points) Tie (1 point)

== Playoffs ==
In the Stanley Cup playoffs, Durnan allowed only 1.53 goals per game as the Canadiens skated to the title. At season's end, Durnan was awarded the Vezina Trophy, the first rookie to win the award, and was selected to the league's First All-Star Team.

=== Semi-final: Montreal vs. Toronto ===
Rocket Richard scored seven goals in the series, including all five for Montreal in game two. After giving up the first game at home to Toronto, Montreal took over, winning the next four, finishing the series with an 11–0 shellacking in game five.

Date	Away	Score	Home	Score	Notes
March 21	Toronto	3	Montreal	1	
March 23	Toronto	1	Montreal	5	
March 25	Montreal	2	Toronto	1	
March 28	Montreal	4	Toronto	1	
March 30	Toronto	0	Montreal	11	

=== Stanley Cup Final: Montreal vs. Chicago ===
Maurice 'Rocket' Richard made his Stanley Cup debut with a five-goal performance in the series, including a hat-trick in game two. The Punch Line of Richard, Elmer Lach and Toe Blake scored 10 of the Canadiens 16 goals. Blake scored the Cup winner in overtime. In the same overtime, Bill Durnan stopped the first penalty shot awarded in the finals, awarded to Virgil Johnson.

Date	Away	Score	Home	Score	Notes
April 4	Chicago	1	Montreal	5	
April 6	Montreal	3	Chicago	1	
April 9	Montreal	3	Chicago	2	
April 13	Chicago	4	Montreal	5	OT

Montreal won the best-of-seven series 4–0.

== Player statistics ==
=== Regular season ===
==== Scoring ====
Player	Pos	GP	G	A	Pts	PIM
Elmer Lach	C	48	24	48	72	23
Toe Blake	LW	41	26	33	59	10
Maurice Richard	RW	46	32	22	54	45
Buddy O'Connor	C	44	12	42	54	6
Ray Getliffe	C/LW	44	28	25	53	44
Phil Watson	RW/C	44	17	32	49	61
Gerry Heffernan	RW	43	28	20	48	12
Murph Chamberlain	LW	47	15	32	47	85
Fern Majeau	C/LW	44	20	18	38	39
Leo Lamoureux	C/D	44	8	23	31	32
Bob Fillion	LW	41	7	23	30	14
Mike McMahon	D	42	7	17	24	98
Glen Harmon	D	43	5	16	21	36
Emile Bouchard	D	39	5	14	19	52
Tod Campeau	C	2	0	0	0	0
Bill Durnan	G	50	0	0	0	0
Bob Walton	C/RW	4	0	0	0	0

==== Goaltending ====
Player	MIN	GP	W	L	T	GA	GAA	SO
Bill Durnan	3000	50	38	5	7	109	2.18	2
Team:	3000	50	38	5	7	109	2.18	2

=== Playoffs ===
==== Scoring ====
Player	Pos	GP	G	A	Pts	PIM
Toe Blake	LW	9	7	11	18	2
Maurice Richard	RW	9	12	5	17	10
Elmer Lach	C	9	2	11	13	4
Ray Getliffe	C/LW	9	5	4	9	16
Murph Chamberlain	LW	9	5	3	8	12
Phil Watson	RW/C	9	3	5	8	16
Emile Bouchard	D	9	1	3	4	4
Glen Harmon	D	9	1	2	3	4
Gerry Heffernan	RW	7	1	2	3	8
Mike McMahon	D	8	1	2	3	16
Buddy O'Connor	C	8	1	2	3	2
Leo Lamoureux	C/D	9	0	3	3	8
Bill Durnan	G	9	0	0	0	0
Bob Fillion	LW	3	0	0	0	0
Fern Majeau	C/LW	1	0	0	0	0

==== Goaltending ====
Player	MIN	GP	W	L	GA	GAA	SO
Bill Durnan	549	9	8	1	14	1.53	1
Team:	549	9	8	1	14	1.53	1

Note:

Pos = Position;GP = Games played; G = Goals; A = Assists; Pts = Points; PIM = Penalty minutes; +/- = Plus/minus; PPG = Power-play goals; SHG = Short-handed goals; GWG = Game-winning goals
Pos = Position;GP = Games played; Min, TOI = Minutes played; W = Wins; L = Losses; T,T/OT = Ties; OTL = Overtime losses; GA = Goals-against; GAA = Goals-against average; SO = Shutouts; SA = Shots against; SV = Shots saved;SV% = Save percentage;

== Awards and records ==
- Bill Durnan, Vezina Trophy
- Bill Durnan, NHL First Team All-Star
- Emile "Butch" Bouchard, Defence, NHL Second Team All-Star
- Elmer Lach, Centre, NHL Second Team All-Star
- Maurice Richard, Right wing, NHL Second Team All-Star
- Dick Irvin, Coach, NHL First Team All-Star

== See also ==
- 1943–44 NHL season
- List of Stanley Cup champions
