= 1943–44 Toronto Maple Leafs season =

NHL hockey team season

1943–44 Toronto Maple Leafs
- League: 3rd NHL
- 1943–44 record: 23–23–4
- Home record: 13–11–1
- Road record: 10–12–3
- Goals for: 214
- Goals against: 174

Team information
- General manager: Conn Smythe
- Coach: Hap Day
- Captain: Bob Davidson
- Arena: Maple Leaf Gardens

Team leaders
- Goals: Lorne Carr (36)
- Assists: Gus Bodnar (40); Babe Pratt (40)
- Points: Lorne Carr (74)
- Penalty minutes: Reg Hamilton (32)
- Wins: Paul Bibeault (13)
- Goals against average: Paul Bibeault (3.00)

The 1943–44 Toronto Maple Leafs season was Toronto's 27th season in the National Hockey League (NHL).

== Regular season ==
=== Final standings ===
National Hockey League
		GP	W	L	T	GF	GA	DIFF	Pts
1	Montreal Canadiens	50	38	5	7	234	109	+125	83
2	Detroit Red Wings	50	26	18	6	214	177	+37	58
3	Toronto Maple Leafs	50	23	23	4	214	174	+40	50
4	Chicago Black Hawks	50	22	23	5	178	187	−9	49
5	Boston Bruins	50	19	26	5	223	268	−45	43
6	New York Rangers	50	6	39	5	162	310	−148	17

=== Record vs. opponents ===
1943–44 NHL Records
Team	BOS	CHI	DET	MTL	NYR	TOR
Boston	—	5–5	1–7–2	3–5–2	7–2–1	3–7
Chicago	5–5	—	5–5	0–8–2	7–1–2	5–4–1
Detroit	7–1–2	5–5	—	0–9–1	8–1–1	6–2–2
Montreal	5–3–2	8–0–2	9–0–1	—	9–0–1	7–2–1
New York	2–7–1	1–7–2	1–8–1	0–9–1	—	2–8
Toronto	7–3	4–5–1	2–6–2	2–7–1	8–2	—

== Schedule and results ==
1943–44 regular season
October

Game	Result	Date	Score	Opponent	Record
1	W	October 30	5–2	New York Rangers (1943–44)	1–0–0
2	W	October 31	4–1	@ Chicago Black Hawks (1943–44)	2–0–0

November

Game	Result	Date	Score	Opponent	Record
3	T	November 4	5–5	@ Detroit Red Wings (1943–44)	2–0–1
4	L	November 6	2–5	Boston Bruins (1943–44)	2–1–1
5	W	November 7	7–4	@ New York Rangers (1943–44)	3–1–1
6	T	November 11	2–2	Detroit Red Wings (1943–44)	3–1–2
7	L	November 13	1–4	Chicago Black Hawks (1943–44)	3–2–2
8	L	November 18	2–5	@ Montreal Canadiens (1943–44)	3–3–2
9	L	November 20	2–7	Montreal Canadiens (1943–44)	3–4–2
10	W	November 21	5–2	@ New York Rangers (1943–44)	4–4–2
11	L	November 23	5–8	@ Boston Bruins (1943–44)	4–5–2
12	W	November 27	7–4	Boston Bruins (1943–44)	5–5–2
13	L	November 28	4–6	@ Detroit Red Wings (1943–44)	5–6–2

December

Game	Result	Date	Score	Opponent	Record
14	W	December 2	6–5	Detroit Red Wings (1943–44)	6–6–2
15	W	December 4	11–4	New York Rangers (1943–44)	7–6–2
16	W	December 11	4–2	Montreal Canadiens (1943–44)	8–6–2
17	L	December 12	2–3	@ Chicago Black Hawks (1943–44)	8–7–2
18	L	December 16	1–4	Detroit Red Wings (1943–44)	8–8–2
19	W	December 18	8–4	Chicago Black Hawks (1943–44)	9–8–2
20	W	December 19	5–2	@ Chicago Black Hawks (1943–44)	10–8–2
21	L	December 21	5–8	@ Boston Bruins (1943–44)	10–9–2
22	L	December 25	3–5	New York Rangers (1943–44)	10–10–2
23	W	December 31	4–0	@ New York Rangers (1943–44)	11–10–2

January

Game	Result	Date	Score	Opponent	Record
24	W	January 1	5–2	@ Boston Bruins (1943–44)	12–10–2
25	L	January 4	3–6	@ Montreal Canadiens (1943–44)	12–11–2
26	W	January 6	6–1	Chicago Black Hawks (1943–44)	13–11–2
27	W	January 8	12–3	Boston Bruins (1943–44)	14–11–2
28	W	January 11	5–0	Montreal Canadiens (1943–44)	15–11–2
29	L	January 15	4–6	Detroit Red Wings (1943–44)	15–12–2
30	L	January 16	1–4	@ Detroit Red Wings (1943–44)	15–13–2
31	W	January 18	7–2	@ Boston Bruins (1943–44)	16–13–2
32	L	January 22	1–5	New York Rangers (1943–44)	16–14–2
33	L	January 23	3–5	@ Chicago Black Hawks (1943–44)	16–15–2
34	T	January 27	2–2	@ Montreal Canadiens (1943–44)	16–15–3
35	L	January 29	3–4	Chicago Black Hawks (1943–44)	16–16–3

February

Game	Result	Date	Score	Opponent	Record
36	W	February 5	3–1	Detroit Red Wings (1943–44)	17–16–3
37	L	February 6	2–3	@ Detroit Red Wings (1943–44)	17–17–3
38	L	February 12	2–3	Montreal Canadiens (1943–44)	17–18–3
39	W	February 13	6–3	@ New York Rangers (1943–44)	18–18–3
40	W	February 19	10–4	Boston Bruins (1943–44)	19–18–3
41	T	February 20	0–0	@ Chicago Black Hawks (1943–44)	19–18–4
42	L	February 24	1–3	@ Montreal Canadiens (1943–44)	19–19–4
43	L	February 26	2–3	Chicago Black Hawks (1943–44)	19–20–4
44	W	February 29	7–3	@ Boston Bruins (1943–44)	20–20–4

March

Game	Result	Date	Score	Opponent	Record
45	L	March 4	2–5	Montreal Canadiens (1943–44)	20–21–4
46	L	March 5	3–8	@ Montreal Canadiens (1943–44)	20–22–4
47	W	March 9	8–0	@ New York Rangers (1943–44)	21–22–4
48	W	March 11	5–0	New York Rangers (1943–44)	22–22–4
49	L	March 12	1–4	@ Detroit Red Wings (1943–44)	22–23–4
50	W	March 18	10–2	Boston Bruins (1943–44)	23–23–4

Legend: Win (2 points) Loss (0 points) Tie (1 point)

== Player statistics ==
=== Regular season ===
Scoring

Player	Pos	GP	G	A	Pts	PIM
Lorne Carr	RW	50	36	38	74	9
Gus Bodnar	C	50	22	40	62	18
Babe Pratt	D	50	17	40	57	30
Ted Kennedy	C	49	26	23	49	2
Bob Davidson	LW	47	19	28	47	21
Jackie Hamilton	C	49	20	17	37	4
George Boothman	C/D	49	16	18	34	14
Moe Morris	D	50	12	21	33	22
Mel Hill	RW	17	9	10	19	6
Jack McLean	C/RW	32	3	15	18	30
Reg Hamilton	D	39	4	12	16	32
Tom O'Neill	RW	33	8	7	15	29
Bud Poile	RW	11	6	8	14	9
Don Webster	LW	27	7	6	13	28
Bucko McDonald	D	9	2	4	6	8
Johnny Ingoldsby	RW/D	21	5	0	5	15
Ross Johnstone	D	18	2	0	2	6
Red Carr	LW	5	0	1	1	2
Frank Dunlap	W	15	0	1	1	2
Paul Bibeault	G	29	0	0	0	0
Benny Grant	G	20	0	0	0	0
Jean Marois	G	1	0	0	0	0
Eric Prentice	LW	5	0	0	0	4

Goaltending

Player	MIN	GP	W	L	T	GA	GAA	SO
Paul Bibeault	1740	29	13	14	2	87	3.00	5
Benny Grant	1200	20	9	9	2	83	4.15	0
Jean Marois	60	1	1	0	0	4	4.00	0
Team:	3000	50	23	23	4	174	3.48	5

=== Playoffs ===
Scoring

Player	Pos	GP	G	A	Pts	PIM
George Boothman	C/D	5	2	1	3	2
Moe Morris	D	5	1	2	3	2
Babe Pratt	D	5	0	3	3	4
Ted Kennedy	C	5	1	1	2	4
Jackie Hamilton	C	5	1	0	1	0
Reg Hamilton	D	5	1	0	1	8
Lorne Carr	RW	5	0	1	1	0
Paul Bibeault	G	5	0	0	0	0
Gus Bodnar	C	5	0	0	0	0
Bob Davidson	LW	5	0	0	0	4
Ross Johnstone	D	3	0	0	0	0
Jack McLean	C/RW	3	0	0	0	6
Tom O'Neill	RW	4	0	0	0	6
Don Webster	LW	5	0	0	0	12

Goaltending

Player	MIN	GP	W	L	GA	GAA	SO
Paul Bibeault	300	5	1	4	23	4.60	0
Team:	300	5	1	4	23	4.60	0

Note:

Pos = Position;GP = Games played; G = Goals; A = Assists; Pts = Points; PIM = Penalty minutes; +/- = Plus/minus; PPG = Power-play goals; SHG = Short-handed goals; GWG = Game-winning goals
Pos = Position;GP = Games played; Min, TOI = Minutes played; W = Wins; L = Losses; T,T/OT = Ties; OTL = Overtime losses; GA = Goals-against; GAA = Goals-against average; SO = Shutouts; SA = Shots against; SV = Shots saved;SV% = Save percentage;

== Transactions ==
- September 11, 1943: Acquired Garth Boesch from the Brooklyn Americans in Dispersal Draw
- November 1, 1943: Acquired Red Garrett, Gordon Bell and cash from the New York Rangers for Bucko McDonald
- November 18, 1943: Called up Jean Marois from the Toronto St. Michael's Majors of the OHA
- November 27, 1943: Loaned George Abbott to the Boston Bruins for one game
- December 22, 1943: Loaned Paul Bibeault from the Montreal Canadiens for remainder of the 1943–44 season
