= Durnan =

Durnan (spelling variations include Durnane, Durneen, Durnin, Durnain, Dornan, Dornain, Dorneen, Durning) is an Irish Celtic surname. The original Gaelic form was written as Ó Duirnín or Ó Dornáin, possibly derived from the word dorn, which means fist.

According to tracit.com, the Durnan family can trace their ancestors back to the ancient territories of Ireland between the 11th and 12th centuries, first appearing in ancient medieval records in Antrim. In Britain, the largest concentrations of people with this surname are around Argyll in Scotland and North West England.

New World settlers include Nicholas Durnan who settled in Virginia in 1734; Charles Durnin, who settled in Newcastle in Delaware County, Pennsylvania, in 1827; John Durnin arrived in the city of Philadelphia, Pennsylvania in 1868.

The Durnan crest is a blue demi antelope; the coat of arms features a blue shield, with a silver chevron between three silver antelopes.

== Durnans in the United States ==
The greatest concentrations of Durnans found today in the U.S. are located in Iowa and the Great Northwestern areas of Washington and Oregon. Durnans are found to lesser amounts in the Southwest, such as in and around Globe and Mesa, Arizona. There are some found in Upson county, Georgia. Many Durnans call parts of Canada home. Many Durnans in the U.S. can trace their roots back to a Stephen and Bridget Durnan. Stephen and Bridget are buried at Fairbank, Iowa. Many of their 14 children spread across the country and into Canada, most notably, two brothers, Ed and Bill, who left their boarding school in Chicago and followed the threshing crews out towards the Great Northwest. Many of the Durnans in Iowa are descended from Stephen and Bridget's son Charles who lived and farmed near Fairbank. His son Leo went on to have 19 children and these children have spread to Arizona, Illinois, and Georgia, as well as staying in Iowa. Thomas Durnan, Stephen's son, farmed near Oran for many years and is the father of Phil, Jim, Harry and Nellie Durnan. First cousins to Leo, Phil Durnan settled in the Ossian, Iowa area, Jim Durnan settled in Oelwein, Iowa and Harry settled in Gibbon, Minn.

Regarding the Durnin variation, a story passed down is that Stephen arrived in America during the Great Famine of Ireland with a brother and that Stephen took the vowel A and the brother took the vowel I. There is a tombstone near the one for Stephen and Bridget that is shared and on it contains both the A and I variations of the name.

The earliest Durnans known are the brothers Stephen (1833–1888) and Charles (1835–1881) they are believed to have had a sister married to a British soldier.

It is also believed that the two brothers migrated to the United States (cir 1862) since their sister had inherited the family estate due to the restrictive English inheritance laws.

Family tradition says they were from the town of Armagh in the county of Armagh in Ireland. Their parents are believed to have been Thomas Durnan and Kary McGan. Stephan and Charles emigrated from the port of Killybegs, County Donegal, Ireland.

Charles' wife Ellen and their son Stephen accompanied them to the U.S., stopping in or near Pittsburgh, Pennsylvania where Thomas and Margaret Durnan lived with their 9 children.

It is believed that Stephen and Charles entered the U.S. through the Port of Boston Massachusetts, although this cannot be confirmed as the records were destroyed by fire in 1894. Although the record and names of their children, taken from the will of Stephen Durnan dated July 7, 1888 shows the 12 children listed, at the gravesite in Immaculate Conception Cemetery, Fairbank, Iowa.

== Famous Durnans ==
- Ice hockey player Bill Durnan.
