= Curse of 1940 =

New York Rangers championship drought, 1940–1994

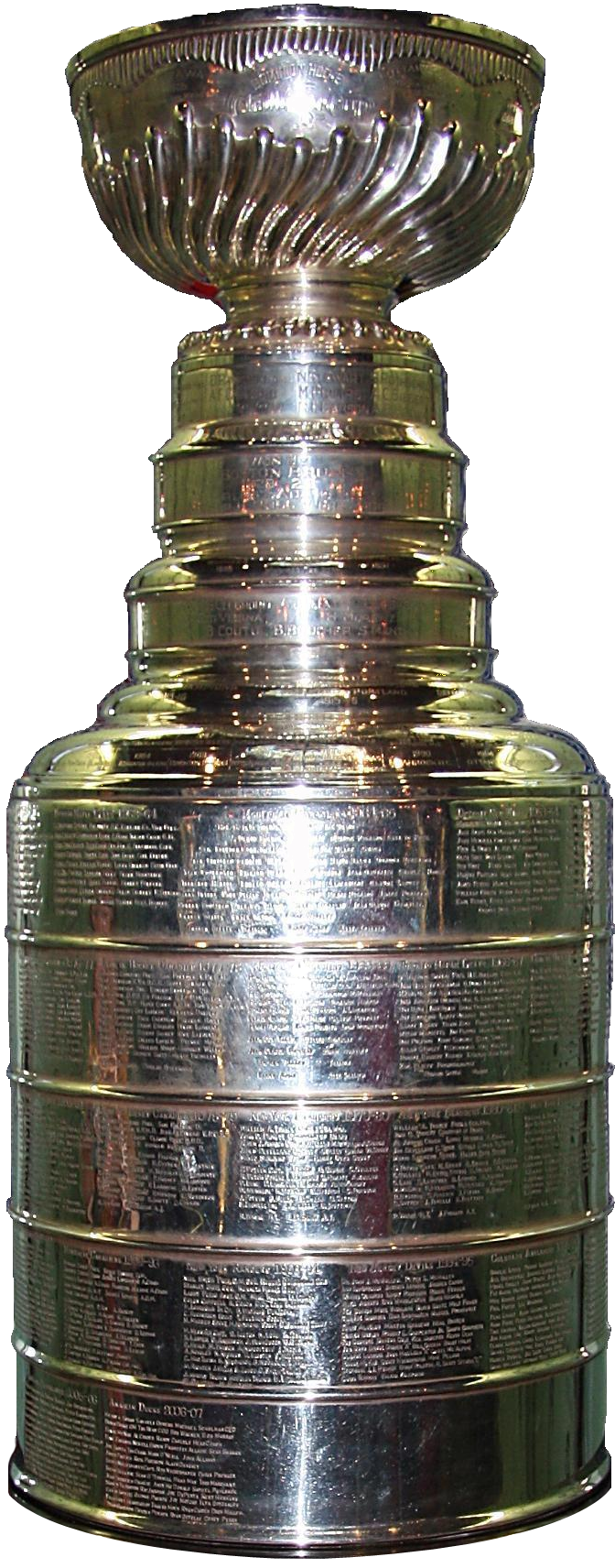
The Stanley Cup.

The Curse of 1940, also called Dutton's Curse, was a superstitious explanation for why the National Hockey League's (NHL) New York Rangers did not win the league's championship trophy, the Stanley Cup, from 1940 through 1994.

== Popular theories ==
The Rangers began play in the 1926–27 season and won a division title in their first season of existence and a Stanley Cup against the Montreal Maroons in their second. They would win two more Cups in 1932–33 and 1939–40, defeating the Toronto Maple Leafs both times.

=== Burning the mortgage ===
During the 1939–40 season, the mortgage on the Rangers' home arena, the third Madison Square Garden (built in 1925), was paid off. The management of the Madison Square Garden Corporation then burned the mortgage in the bowl of the Cup. This led some hockey fans to believe that the Cup, which is regarded almost as a sacred object, had been "desecrated", leading the "hockey gods" to place a curse on the Rangers.

=== Red Dutton ===
Another theory is that the supposed curse came from Red Dutton, the coach and general manager of the New York Americans, for which he had once played. The Amerks were actually the first NHL team to play in New York City, beginning play as soon as the Garden opened for the 1925–26 season. However, their original owner, bootlegger Bill Dwyer, found the going difficult with the end of Prohibition, and the NHL took over ownership of the team in 1937. They made five playoff appearances, including a quarterfinal loss to the Rangers in 1928–29 and a quarterfinal win over the Rangers in 1937–38. However, after beating the Rangers, the Americans fell to the eventual Stanley Cup champion Chicago Black Hawks in the 1938 semifinals, the closest they ever came to winning the Cup.

Following the 1941–42 season, many NHL players entered the armed forces to fight in World War II. This hurt the Americans more than the other teams, and so Dutton announced his team would suspend operations for the duration of the war. He was named NHL President upon the death of Frank Calder in 1943, a post he held until 1946, when he resigned and was replaced by Clarence Campbell.

Dutton had resigned the league presidency with the intention of reviving the Americans. However, the league, with the encouragement of Garden management, reneged on a longstanding promise to allow the Americans to return. A bitter Dutton declared that the Rangers would never win the Cup for as long as he lived. He died in 1987 at 88. At that time, the Rangers were in their 47th season without having won the Cup.

== Original Six era ==
The Curse of 1940 "worked" in several ways, some of them odd. The Madison Square Garden Corporation found it could make more money when Ringling Brothers Barnum and Bailey Circus came to town in the spring. This forced the Rangers, and later the National Basketball Association's (NBA) New York Knicks, to use different arenas at the worst possible time—during their respective leagues' playoffs. At the time, it was impossible to configure arenas in a way that would allow a circus and a hockey or basketball game to take place on the same day. Hence, the Rangers used Maple Leaf Gardens in Toronto as their "home ice" in the 1950 Stanley Cup Final, a move that potentially cost the Rangers that year's Stanley Cup. After the Blueshirts took a 3–2 series lead on the Detroit Red Wings, the NHL cited an obscure rule stating that the deciding game in a Stanley Cup Final cannot be played on neutral ice. Maple Leaf Gardens was labelled "neutral" because its tenants proper were the Leafs, and Madison Square Garden was still occupied by the circus at the time. The Detroit Olympia was thus the venue for the sixth and seventh games, both won by Detroit.

Also, while Dutton was the league president, he oversaw a 1943–44 Rangers team that inherited the title the Americans left behind upon their folding of hardest-hit NHL team by World War II. The Rangers asked the NHL for permission to fold until the end of the war because of their best players' service in the armed forces overseas, but the league refused the Rangers' request, and so they finished well back of the other five teams that year. Notably, career minor-league goaltender Ken McAuley gave up 310 goals in the team's 50 games, a league record for worst goals-against-average (6.2 goals/game) that has stood since. (The closest any goalie since has come to equalling this record is Greg Millen, who allowed 282 goals in 60 games for the Hartford Whalers forty seasons later).

League corruption and favoritism through the entire Original Six era was also a factor in the Rangers' futility. James E. Norris, the owner of the Detroit Red Wings, at one point also owned controlling stakes in both the Rangers and the Chicago Blackhawks, allowing him to stack the best players onto the Red Wings. This continued after the elder Norris' death, as his two sons, James D. and Bruce Norris, continued to control the three teams. Also during this time, the NHL still held territorial drafts, in which teams would get first rights to players who played junior hockey within a 50-mile radius of the home stadium; this gave Toronto, Detroit and Montreal significant recruiting advantages, since the areas around those cities were far more developed in their junior hockey programs than those further from the Canada–US border, including the Rangers.

== New York Islanders ==
The Rangers struggled for several years after World War II; after their 1950 Final appearance they only made the playoffs six times in 17 seasons. In 1972, they reached the Stanley Cup Final for the first time in 22 years but lost to the Boston Bruins, who were led by Bobby Orr and Phil Esposito. The next season saw the founding of an expansion team playing on Long Island, the New York Islanders. In 1975, the Islanders qualified for the playoffs for the first time and met the Rangers in the best-of-three Preliminary Round. They shockingly defeated the Rangers two games to one, with J. P. Parisé scoring the series-winning goal in overtime in Game 3. The two teams squared off in the postseason again in the 1979 semifinals, a season in which the rapidly-improving Islanders finished with the best record in the league. However, in a stunning upset of their own, the Rangers downed the Islanders in six games to advance to the Stanley Cup Final. They would lose in the Final in five games to the Montreal Canadiens, who won their fourth Stanley Cup championship in a row.

The Islanders won the Stanley Cup for the first time in 1980, beginning their own streak of four consecutive championships. Their 1983 title, won in the team's 11th season of existence, gave them one more championship than the Rangers had won in their entire 57-year history to that point. During the Islanders' second Cup run, in 1981, they swept the Rangers in the second round. During that series, Islanders fans taunted the Rangers by chanting "1940!" Fans in other NHL cities soon picked up the chant. Moreover, in 1982, the Colorado Rockies moved to suburban East Rutherford, New Jersey and became the New Jersey Devils, giving the Rangers a second rival in the New York metropolitan area. It was also in the 1980s that the idea of a "Curse of 1940" began to take hold, with Red Dutton's death in 1987 and the occasional publication of the photograph of the Garden mortgage being burned in the Cup's bowl (the third Garden was demolished after the Rangers and Knicks moved into the current Garden in 1968).

In 1991–92, the Rangers finished with the best overall record in the NHL, earning them their first of four Presidents' Trophies, but they lost to the defending Cup champion (and eventual repeat champion) Pittsburgh Penguins in the Patrick Division finals. Although the Penguins were defending champions, and their victory was hardly a shocking one, an odd moment came during the third period of Game 4 when, with the Rangers leading 4–2, Pittsburgh forward Ron Francis took a shot from the blue line that beat Rangers goaltender Mike Richter. Francis' goal shifted the momentum to the Penguins, who eventually tied the game and won it in overtime. In addition, Adam Graves had been suspended for the remainder of the series following Game 3 after a review of a slash he delivered to Mario Lemieux in Game 2. The next season, with hopes high, the Rangers finished last in the Patrick Division, largely because of an injury to their star defenseman Brian Leetch. In the kind of incident many fans ascribe to curses, Leetch arrived at the Garden in a taxi, stepped out, and broke his ankle when he slipped on a patch of ice, a most ironic injury for a hockey player. Head coach Roger Neilson was fired late in the season as a result of the team’s performance.

== End of the Curse ==
By the 1994 season, the Rangers had not won the Stanley Cup in 53 years. In that time, championships had been won in the New York area by the Islanders (4), the New York Yankees (14; but none since 1978 and no postseasons since 1981, but they were dealing with a curse which seriously destroyed the team to the core.), the New York Mets (2), the New York Giants baseball team (1 prior to the franchise's move to San Francisco in 1958), the Brooklyn Dodgers (1 prior to the franchise's move to Los Angeles in 1958), the New York Giants football team (4), the New York Jets (1), the New York Knicks (two NBA titles) and the New Jersey Nets (2 ABA titles, playing as the New York Nets). In addition, all five of the other Original Six teams had won Stanley Cups since 1940 (the Canadiens 20 times, the Maple Leafs 10 times, the Red Wings five times, the Bruins three times, and the Black Hawks once), as had four other post-1967 expansion teams besides the Islanders (the Edmonton Oilers five times, the Penguins and Philadelphia Flyers twice, and the Calgary Flames once).

The Rangers stormed through the 1993–94 regular season, scoring 112 points en route to clinching their second Presidents' Trophy in three years. They swept aside the Islanders in the first round of the playoffs and defeated the Washington Capitals in five games in the second round before meeting the Devils (whom they had beaten in the 1992 Patrick Division semifinals) in the Eastern Conference finals. Devils fans had picked up the "1940!" chant and the curse myth from Islander fans, and the hockey seating capacity of the Devils' home arena, the Brendan Byrne Arena (later renamed the Continental Airlines Arena and then Izod Center), was 19,040. With the Rangers trailing the series three games to two and facing elimination, it looked as though the curse was at work again. However, Rangers captain Mark Messier challenged the New York media by "guaranteeing" his team would win Game 6: "We know we're going in there to win Game 6 and bringing it back for Game 7. We feel we can win it and we feel we are going to win it." The New York Post and New York Daily News both carried back pages offering Messier's guarantee: "We'll Win Tonight." Ranger coach Mike Keenan said of the guarantee: "Mark was sending a message to his teammates that he believed together we could win. He put on an amazing performance to make sure it happened."

The Rangers fell behind 2–0, but trailing 2–1 in the third period, Messier scored a natural hat trick (three straight goals) to make good on his guarantee and force a deciding seventh game. The curse threatened again in Game 7 as the Rangers led 1–0 and looked as though they were about to advance to the Cup Final when New Jersey's Valeri Zelepukin scored with 7.7 seconds remaining in regulation to tie the game, but in the second overtime, Stéphane Matteau scored to give the Rangers the game and the series.

The Rangers moved on to the Stanley Cup Final against the Vancouver Canucks and took a 3–2 lead late in the third period of the deciding seventh game. They shot the puck down the length of the ice with seven seconds left. Thinking the game was over, the Rangers poured onto the ice in celebration. However, the Canucks touched the puck to stop play with 1.1 seconds left in regulation. The officials reset the clock to 1.6 seconds and ordered a faceoff in the Rangers' zone. Messier and Craig MacTavish conferred and came up with a gambit to ensure the Rangers' win. Both of them, deciding that the officials wouldn't call a penalty at such a dramatic moment, committed infractions on the final drop of the puck as first MacTavish, then Messier whacked and cross-checked Vancouver's star forward Pavel Bure. As the team celebrated on the ice before the presentation of the Stanley Cup, Ranger fans in the Garden chanted "1940!" as a symbolic end to the curse, only to begin Canada's longest Final absence; the Canucks represented Canada's last Final appearance until the 2004 Calgary Flames, which lost to the Tampa Bay Lightning, also in seven games.
