= George Abbott (ice hockey) =

Canadian ice hockey player (1911–1996)

- Born: August 3, 1911 Sydenham, Ontario, Canada
- Died: December 31, 1996 (aged 85) Burlington, Ontario, Canada
- Height: 5 ft 7 in (170 cm)
- Weight: 153 lb (69 kg; 10 st 13 lb)
- Position: Goaltender
- Caught: Left
- Played for: Boston Bruins
- Playing career: 1943–1943

George Henry Abbott (August 3, 1911 – December 31, 1996) was a Canadian professional ice hockey goaltender who played in one National Hockey League game for the Boston Bruins during the 1943–44 NHL season. He was born in Sydenham, Ontario, but grew up in Hamilton, Ontario.

== Playing career ==
Abbott was the practice goaltender for the Toronto Maple Leafs as well as a minister. He played for the Dunnville Mudcats before his career ended during a practice session with the Hamilton Tigers when a deflected puck struck him in the eye. On November 27, 1943, the Maple Leafs were due to play the Boston Bruins where the Bruins' starting goaltender Bert Gardiner suffered from illness and couldn't play. Bruins coach Art Ross borrowed Abbott to play for the night. Toronto went on to win the game 7-3 as Abbott faced 52 shots. He was knocked out for a few minutes by a shot from Babe Pratt.

Abbott was known as "The Preacher," as he became a Baptist minister after giving up hockey after his injury. He was assigned to the Toronto area during 1943 and the Leafs took him on as a practice goalie.

== Career statistics ==
			Regular season									Playoffs
Season	Team	League	GP	W	L	T	MIN	GA	SO	GAA	SV%	GP	W	L	MIN	GA	SO	GAA	SV%
1943–44	Boston Bruins	NHL	1	0	1	0	60	7	0	7.00	—	—	—	—	—	—	—	—	—
NHL totals			1	0	1	0	60	7	0	7.00	—	—	—	—	—	—	—	—	—

== See also ==
- List of players who played only one game in the NHL
