= 1943–44 New York Rangers season =

NHL hockey team season

1943–44 New York Rangers
- League: 6th NHL
- 1943–44 record: 6–39–5
- Home record: 4–17–4
- Road record: 2–22–1
- Goals for: 162
- Goals against: 310

Team information
- General manager: Lester Patrick
- Coach: Frank Boucher
- Captain: Ott Heller
- Arena: Madison Square Garden

Team leaders
- Goals: Bryan Hextall (21)
- Assists: Bryan Hextall (33)
- Points: Bryan Hextall (54)
- Penalty minutes: Bob Dill (66)
- Wins: Ken McAuley (6)
- Goals against average: Ken McAuley (6.24)

The 1943–44 New York Rangers season was the franchise's 18th season. During the regular season, the Rangers had a 6–39–5 record and compiled 17 points, the fewest of any team in franchise history. New York finished in last place in the NHL, missing the playoffs for the second consecutive season for the first time in franchise history.

== Regular season ==
=== Final standings ===
National Hockey League
		GP	W	L	T	GF	GA	DIFF	Pts
1	Montreal Canadiens	50	38	5	7	234	109	+125	83
2	Detroit Red Wings	50	26	18	6	214	177	+37	58
3	Toronto Maple Leafs	50	23	23	4	214	174	+40	50
4	Chicago Black Hawks	50	22	23	5	178	187	−9	49
5	Boston Bruins	50	19	26	5	223	268	−45	43
6	New York Rangers	50	6	39	5	162	310	−148	17

=== Record vs. opponents ===
1943–44 NHL Records
Team	BOS	CHI	DET	MTL	NYR	TOR
Boston	—	5–5	1–7–2	3–5–2	7–2–1	3–7
Chicago	5–5	—	5–5	0–8–2	7–1–2	5–4–1
Detroit	7–1–2	5–5	—	0–9–1	8–1–1	6–2–2
Montreal	5–3–2	8–0–2	9–0–1	—	9–0–1	7–2–1
New York	2–7–1	1–7–2	1–8–1	0–9–1	—	2–8
Toronto	7–3	4–5–1	2–6–2	2–7–1	8–2	—

== Schedule and results ==
1943–44 regular season
October: 0–2–0 (home: 0-0-0; road: 0–2–0)

Game	October	Opponent	Score	Record
1	30	@ Toronto Maple Leafs	5–2	0–1–0
2	31	@ Detroit Red Wings	8–3	0–2–0

November: 0–9–1 (home: 0–5–1; road: 0–4–0)

Game	November	Opponent	Score	Record
3	2	@ Montreal Canadiens	2–1	0–3–0
4	6	Chicago Black Hawks	4–3	0–4–0
5	7	Toronto Maple Leafs	7–4	0–5–0
6	13	Boston Bruins	6–2	0–6–0
7	14	@ Chicago Black Hawks	10–5	0–7–0
8	18	Detroit Red Wings	3–1	0–8–0
9	21	Toronto Maple Leafs	5–2	0–9–0
10	25	@ Boston Bruins	6–2	0–10–0
11	27	@ Montreal Canadiens	6–3	0–11–0
12	28	Montreal Canadiens	2–2	0–11–1

December: 4–5–0 (home: 3–1–0; road: 1–4–0)

Game	December	Opponent	Score	Record
13	4	@ Toronto Maple Leafs	11–4	0–12–1
14	5	@ Chicago Black Hawks	7–6	0–13–1
15	11	@ Boston Bruins	9–6	0–14–1
16	12	Boston Bruins	6–4	1–14–1
17	19	Detroit Red Wings	6–2	2–14–1
18	23	@ Detroit Red Wings	5–3	2–15–1
19	25	@ Toronto Maple Leafs	5–3	3–15–1
20	26	Chicago Black Hawks	7–6	4–15–1
21	31	Toronto Maple Leafs	4–0	4–16–1

January: 2–9–0 (home: 1–5–0; road: 1–4–0)

Game	January	Opponent	Score	Record
22	2	Boston Bruins	13–3	4–17–1
23	6	Detroit Red Wings	5–0	4–18–1
24	8	@ Montreal Canadiens	8–2	4–19–1
25	9	Montreal Canadiens	6–5	4–20–1
26	13	Chicago Black Hawks	5–2	4–21–1
27	15	@ Boston Bruins	7–5	4–22–1
28	16	Boston Bruins	8–6	5–22–1
29	22	@ Toronto Maple Leafs	5–1	6–22–1
30	23	@ Detroit Red Wings	15–0	6–23–1
31	27	@ Chicago Black Hawks	6–4	6–24–1
32	30	Montreal Canadiens	5–3	6–25–1

February: 0–8–2 (home: 0–4–2; road: 0–4–0)

Game	February	Opponent	Score	Record
33	3	@ Detroit Red Wings	12–2	6–26–1
34	5	@ Boston Bruins	7–2	6–27–1
35	6	Chicago Black Hawks	4–4	6–27–2
36	10	Detroit Red Wings	8–3	6–28–2
37	13	Toronto Maple Leafs	6–3	6–29–2
38	19	@ Montreal Canadiens	5–2	6–30–2
39	20	Montreal Canadiens	7–2	6–31–2
40	22	Chicago Black Hawks	8–4	6–32–2
41	24	Detroit Red Wings	3–3	6–32–3
42	27	@ Chicago Black Hawks	4–2	6–33–3

March: 0–6–2 (home: 0–2–1; road: 0–4–1)

Game	March	Opponent	Score	Record
43	2	@ Detroit Red Wings	6–5	6–34–3
44	4	@ Boston Bruins	10–9	6–35–3
45	5	Boston Bruins	4–4	6–35–4
46	9	Toronto Maple Leafs	8–0	6–36–4
47	11	@ Toronto Maple Leafs	5–0	6–37–4
48	12	@ Chicago Black Hawks	4–4	6–37–5
49	18	@ Montreal Canadiens	11–2	6–38–5
50	19	Montreal Canadiens	6–1	6–39–5

Legend: Win (2 points) Loss (0 points) Tie (1 point)

== Player statistics ==
Skaters

Regular season
Player	GP	G	A	Pts	PIM
Bryan Hextall	50	21	33	54	41
Wilbert Hiller	50	18	22	40	15
Ehrhardt Heller	50	8	27	35	29
Ab DeMarco^{†}	36	14	19	33	2
John Mahaffy	28	9	20	29	0
Oscar Aubuchon^{†}	38	16	12	28	4
Fern Gauthier	33	14	10	24	0
John McDonald	43	10	9	19	6
Billy Gooden	41	9	8	17	15
Grant Warwick	18	8	9	17	14
James MacDonald	24	7	9	16	4
Bob Dill	28	6	10	16	66
Frank Boucher	15	4	10	14	2
Wilfred McDonald^{†}	39	5	6	11	14
Bill Warwick	13	3	2	5	12
Chuck Scherza^{†}	24	3	2	5	13
Don Raleigh	15	2	2	4	2
Gordon Davidson	16	1	3	4	4
Roger Leger	7	1	2	3	2
Aldo Palazzari^{†}	12	2	0	2	0
Charlie Sands	9	0	2	2	0
Tom Dewar	9	0	2	2	4
Hank D'Amore	4	1	0	1	2
James Jamieson	1	0	1	1	0
Archie Fraser	3	0	1	1	0
Bob McDonald	1	0	0	0	0
Lloyd Mohns	1	0	0	0	0
Tony Demers	1	0	0	0	0
Henry Dyck	1	0	0	0	0
Jack Mann	3	0	0	0	0
Max Labovitch	5	0	0	0	4
Art Strobel	7	0	0	0	0

Goaltenders

Regular season
Player	GP	TOI	W	L	T	GA	GAA	SO
Ken McAuley	50	2980	6	39	5	310	6.24	0
Harry Lumley^{‡}	1	20	0	0	0	0	0.00	0

^{†}Denotes player spent time with another team before joining Rangers. Stats reflect time with Rangers only.
^{‡}Traded mid-season. Stats reflect time with Rangers only.

Note:

Pos = Position;GP = Games played; G = Goals; A = Assists; Pts = Points; PIM = Penalty minutes; +/- = Plus/minus; PPG = Power-play goals; SHG = Short-handed goals; GWG = Game-winning goals
Pos = Position;GP = Games played; Min, TOI = Minutes played; W = Wins; L = Losses; T,T/OT = Ties; OTL = Overtime losses; GA = Goals-against; GAA = Goals-against average; SO = Shutouts; SA = Shots against; SV = Shots saved;SV% = Save percentage;

== Awards and records ==
- Longest losing streak to start the season (11 games)
- Longest winless streak to start the season (15 games: 14 losses, 1 tie)
