= Jean Marois =

Canadian ice hockey player

- Born: November 5, 1924 Quebec City, Quebec, Canada
- Died: January 3, 1996 (aged 71) Saint-Antoine-de-Tilly, Quebec, Canada
- Height: 5 ft 8 in (173 cm)
- Weight: 155 lb (70 kg; 11 st 1 lb)
- Position: Goaltender
- Caught: Left
- Played for: Toronto Maple Leafs; Chicago Black Hawks
- Playing career: 1943–1955

Jean Edouard Alfred Joseph Marois (November 5, 1924 – January 3, 1996) was a Canadian professional ice hockey goaltender who played three games in the National Hockey League: one with the Toronto Maple Leafs in 1943, and two with the Chicago Black Hawks in 1953. Marois served with the Canadian Forces from 1944 to 1945. He spent the majority of his career, which lasted from 1943 to 1955, with the Quebec Aces of the Quebec Senior Hockey League. He was born in Quebec City, Quebec and died in 1996 in Saint-Antoine-de-Tilly.

== Career statistics ==
=== Regular season and playoffs ===
			Regular season								Playoffs
Season	Team	League	GP	W	L	T	Min	GA	SO	GAA	GP	W	L	T	Min	GA	SO	GAA
1939–40	St. Michael's Buzzers	OHA-B	1	1	0	0	60	3	0	3.00	—	—	—	—	—	—	—	—
1940–41	St. Michael's Buzzers	OHA-B	5	2	2	1	370	16	0	2.59	—	—	—	—	—	—	—	—
1941–42	St. Michael's Buzzers	OHA-B	2	0	2	0	120	9	0	4.50	—	—	—	—	—	—	—	—
1941–42	St. Michael's Majors	OHA	4	1	3	0	240	22	0	5.50	2	0	1	—	100	10	0	6.00
1942–43	St. Michael's Majors	OHA	20	8	11	1	1230	99	0	4.83	6	3	3	—	360	35	1	5.95
1942–43	Toronto Tip Tops	TIHL	1	0	0	1	70	4	0	3.43	—	—	—	—	—	—	—	—
1942–43	St. Michael's Majors	M-Cup	—	—	—	—	—	—	—	—	2	2	0	—	120	7	0	3.50
1943–44	Toronto Maple Leafs	NHL	1	1	0	0	60	4	0	4.00	—	—	—	—	—	—	—	—
1943–44	St. Michael's Majors	OHA	14	11	3	0	840	44	1	3.14	6	—	—	—	360	20	0	3.38
1945–46	Quebec Aces	QSHL	7	—	—	—	420	38	0	5.43	6	1	3	2	360	28	0	4.67
1946–47	Quebec Aces	QSHL	32	—	—	—	1920	119	0	3.72	—	—	—	—	—	—	—	—
1947–48	Quebec Aces	QSHL	35	—	—	—	2080	120	0	3.46	10	6	4	—	600	30	1	3.00
1948–49	Quebec Aces	QSHL	59	22	31	6	3540	205	4	3.47	3	0	3	—	180	18	0	6.00
1949–50	Shawinigan Falls Cataractes	QSHL	46	13	31	6	2820	204	3	4.34	—	—	—	—	—	—	—	—
1950–51	Quebec Aces	QSHL	60	31	22	7	3600	192	3	3.20	19	12	7	—	1140	55	1	2.89
1951–52	Quebec Aces	QSHL	48	31	12	5	2950	126	6	2.56	8	6	2	—	519	18	1	2.08
1952–53	Quebec Aces	QSHL	36	13	14	8	2220	118	1	3.19	1	0	1	—	60	6	0	6.00
1953–54	Chicago Black Hawks	NHL	2	0	2	0	120	11	0	5.50	—	—	—	—	—	—	—	—
1953–54	Hershey Bears	AHL	6	4	2	0	360	16	0	2.67	—	—	—	—	—	—	—	—
1953–54	Providence Reds	AHL	3	2	1	0	180	11	0	3.67	—	—	—	—	—	—	—	—
1953–54	Quebec Aces	QSHL	15	6	7	2	927	54	0	3.50	1	—	—	—	60	3	0	3.00
1954–55	Providence Reds	AHL	11	4	6	1	660	47	0	4.27	—	—	—	—	—	—	—	—
1954–55	Quebec Aces	QSHL	17	9	7	1	1013	56	1	3.32	—	—	—	—	—	—	—	—
NHL totals			3	1	2	0	180	15	0	5.00	—	—	—	—	—	—	—	—
