= Bernie Ruelle =

American ice hockey player (1920–1995)

- Born: November 23, 1920 Houghton, Michigan, U.S.
- Died: August 4, 1995 (aged 74)
- Height: 5 ft 9 in (175 cm)
- Weight: 165 lb (75 kg; 11 st 11 lb)
- Position: Left wing
- Shot: Left
- Played for: Detroit Red Wings
- Playing career: 1939–1947

Bernard Edward Ruelle (November 23, 1920 – August 4, 1995) was an American professional ice hockey winger who played two games in the National Hockey League with the Detroit Red Wings during the 1943–44 season. The rest of his career, which lasted from 1939 to 1947, was spent in the minor leagues.

== Career statistics ==
=== Regular season and playoffs ===
			Regular season					Playoffs
Season	Team	League	GP	G	A	Pts	PIM	GP	G	A	Pts	PIM
1939–40	Detroit Pontiacs	MOHL	34	5	8	13	14	—	—	—	—	—
1939–40	Detroit Holzbaugh	MOHL	—	—	—	—	—	4	1	0	1	0
1940–41	Detroit Holzbaugh	MOHL	25	6	6	12	11	5	4	2	6	8
1941–42	Toledo Babcocks	MOHL	—	—	—	—	—	—	—	—	—	—
1941–42	Detroit Holzbaugh	MOHL	28	16	14	30	6	7	3	2	5	4
1943–44	Detroit Red Wings	NHL	2	1	0	1	0	—	—	—	—	—
1943–44	Indianapolis Capitals	AHL	48	8	15	23	9	5	1	0	1	2
1946–47	Tacoma Rockets	NHL	—	—	—	—	—	—	—	—	—	—
1946–47	Fresno Falcons	PCHL	44	14	9	23	20	2	0	0	0	0
NHL totals			2	1	0	1	0	—	—	—	—	—
