= Maurice Courteau =

Canadian ice hockey player

- Born: February 18, 1914 Quebec City, Quebec, Canada
- Died: November 20, 1985 (aged 71) Quebec City, Quebec, Canada
- Height: 5 ft 8 in (173 cm)
- Weight: 162 lb (73 kg; 11 st 8 lb)
- Position: Goaltender
- Caught: Left
- Played for: Boston Bruins
- Playing career: 1938–1948

Joseph Laurent Maurice Courteau (February 18, 1914 – November 20, 1985) was a Canadian ice hockey goaltender. He played in the NHL for the Boston Bruins.

Courteau was in net for the full 60 minutes of the game on March 16, 1944 in which the Detroit Red Wings beat the Bruins 10-9. At the time, the 19 goals scored by both teams was a modern NHL record for the most in a game.

== Career statistics ==
=== Regular season and playoffs ===
			Regular season								Playoffs
Season	Team	League	GP	W	L	T	MIN	GA	SO	GAA	GP	W	L	T	MIN	GA	SO	GAA
1935–36	Noranda Copper Kings	NOHA	2	1	1	0	120	9	0	4.50	—	—	—	—	—	—	—	—
1936–37	Noranda Copper Kings	NOHA	—	—	—	—	—	—	—	—	—	—	—	—	—	—	—	—
1937–38	Noranda Copper Kings	NOHA	16	1	13	2	960	86	0	5.37	—	—	—	—	—	—	—	—
1938–39	Atlantic City Sea Gulls	EAHL	53	22	25	6	3180	184	2	3.47	—	—	—	—	—	—	—	—
1939–40	Shawinigan Falls Cataractes	QPHL	40	—	—	—	2400	155	1	3.88	—	—	—	—	—	—	—	—
1940–41	Quebec Royal Rifles	QCHL	33	17	11	5	1980	117	0	3.54	4	—	—	—	240	14	1	3.50
1941–42	Quebec Aces	QSHL	7	—	—	—	420	15	1	2.14	1	0	1	0	60	5	0	5.00
1942–43	Philadelphia Falcons	EAHL	26	—	—	—	1560	88	2	3.39	—	—	—	—	—	—	—	—
1943–44	Boston Bruins	NHL	6	2	4	0	360	33	0	5.50	—	—	—	—	—	—	—	—
1943–44	Boston Olympics	EAHL	36	34	1	1	2160	79	4	2.19	10	4	6	0	600	42	0	4.20
1943–44	Providence Reds	AHL	1	0	0	1	60	2	0	2.00	—	—	—	—	—	—	—
1944–45	Boston Olympics	EAHL	33	22	9	2	1980	129	1	3.91	8	7	0	1	480	26	0	3.25
1945–46	Sherbrooke Randies	QSHL	11	—	—	—	660	38	0	3.45	—	—	—	—	—	—	—	—
1946–47	Philadelphia Rockets	AHL	7	0	6	0	380	49	0	7.74	—	—	—	—	—	—	—	—
1946–47	San Francisco Shamrocks	PCHL	24	—	—	—	1440	145	0	6.04	—	—	—	—	—	—	—	—
1947–48	New York Rovers	QSHL	12	—	—	—	720	57	0	4.75	—	—	—	—	—	—	—	—
1947–48	Philadelphia Rockets	AHL	30	8	21	1	1800	144	1	4.80	—	—	—	—	—	—	—	—
1949–50	Magog Volants	ETSHL	19	—	—	—	1140	82	2	4.32	—	—	—	—	—	—	—	—
NHL totals			6	2	4	0	360	33	0	5.50	—	—	—	—	—	—	—	—
