= Fern Majeau =

Canadian ice hockey player

- Born: May 3, 1916 Verdun, Quebec, Canada
- Died: June 17, 1966 (aged 50)
- Height: 5 ft 9 in (175 cm)
- Weight: 154 lb (70 kg; 11 st 0 lb)
- Position: Centre
- Shot: Left
- Played for: Montreal Canadiens
- Playing career: 1937–1949

Joseph Adelard Fernand Majeau (May 3, 1916 – June 17, 1966) was a Canadian ice hockey player. He played 56 games in the National Hockey League with the Montreal Canadiens during the 1943–44 and 1944–45 seasons. He won the Stanley Cup with Montreal in 1944. The majority of his career, which lasted from 1935 to 1949, was spent in the minor leagues.

== Career statistics ==
=== Regular season and playoffs ===
			Regular season					Playoffs
Season	Team	League	GP	G	A	Pts	PIM	GP	G	A	Pts	PIM
1934–35	Verdun Maple Leafs	QJAHA	10	9	12	21	12	5	6	2	8	6
1934–35	Verdun Maple Leafs	MTL Sr	1	0	0	0	2	—	—	—	—	—
1935–36	Verdun Maple Leafs	QJAHA	9	8	8	16	10	—	—	—	—	—
1935–36	Verdun Maple Leafs	MTL Sr	5	0	3	3	0	7	2	2	4	2
1936–37	Verdun Maple Leafs	MTL Sr	21	3	6	9	40	—	—	—	—	—
1937–38	Montreal Royals	MCHL	12	4	5	9	8	1	0	1	1	0
1938–39	Lachine Rapides	QPHL	36	12	9	21	38	6	0	1	1	4
1939–40	Lachine Rapides	QPHL	41	17	25	42	54	9	8	6	14	4
1940–41	Verdun Maple Leafs	MCHL	34	16	18	34	31	—	—	—	—	—
1941–42	Montreal Pats	MCHL	28	11	8	19	22	—	—	—	—	—
1942–43	Montreal Senior Canadiens	QSHL	24	8	5	13	17	4	4	2	6	2
1943–44	Montreal Canadiens	NHL	44	20	18	38	39	1	0	0	0	0
1944–45	Montreal Canadiens	NHL	12	2	6	8	4	—	—	—	—	—
1944–45	Montreal Royals	QSHL	9	6	7	13	10	7	4	0	4	10
1945–46	Valleyfield Braves	QSHL	39	17	27	44	46	—	—	—	—	—
1946–47	Valleyfield Braves	QSHL	33	10	25	35	32	—	—	—	—	—
1947–48	Lachine Rapides	QPHL	53	23	32	55	42	6	3	3	6	2
1948–49	Montreal Hydro Quebec	MCHL	11	6	10	16	—	—	—	—	—	—
NHL totals			56	22	24	46	43	1	0	0	0	0
