= Clint Smith (ice hockey) =

Canadian ice hockey player and coach (1913–2009)

- Hockey Hall of Fame, 1991
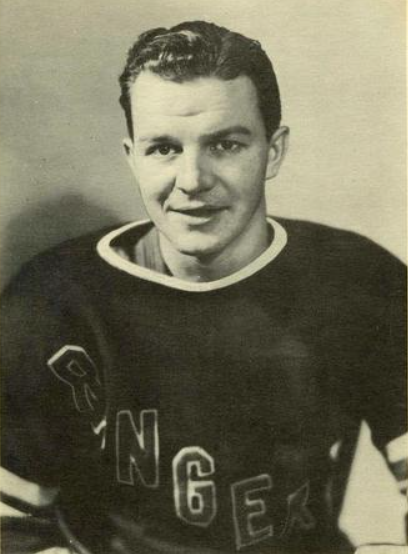
- Smith, c. 1930 photo
- Born: December 12, 1913 Assiniboia, Saskatchewan, Canada
- Died: May 19, 2009 (aged 95) Vancouver, British Columbia, Canada
- Height: 5 ft 8 in (173 cm)
- Weight: 165 lb (75 kg; 11 st 11 lb)
- Position: Centre
- Shot: Left
- Played for: Chicago Black Hawks; New York Rangers
- Playing career: 1932–1952

Clinton James "Snuffy" Smith (December 12, 1913 – May 19, 2009) was a Canadian professional ice hockey centre and head coach best known for his time spent in the National Hockey League (NHL) as a player with the New York Rangers and the Chicago Black Hawks. Following Smith's 10-year NHL career, he served as both a head coach and player in the United States Hockey League (USHL) and American Hockey League (AHL).

== Playing career ==
=== Minor leagues (1932–1937) ===
Before beginning his NHL career with the New York Rangers in 1936–37, Smith played in several minor professional leagues. After splitting his first professional season in 1932–33 with the Springfield Indians of the Canadian-American Hockey League (CAHL) and Saskatoon Crescents of the West Coast Hockey League (WCHL), Smith moved further west to play for the Vancouver Lions of the North West Hockey League (NWHL), where he led the league in scoring with 25 goals in his rookie year. He then went on to lead the league in points the next two seasons with 44- and 53-point campaigns.

In 1936–37, Smith joined the International-American Hockey League (I-AHL), precursor to the American Hockey League (AHL), and finished second in league scoring to Jack Markle with 54 points as a member of the Philadelphia Ramblers. He helped lead his team to the Finals of the inaugural Calder Cup championship but lost to the Syracuse Stars in four games of what was a five-game series.

=== New York Rangers (1937–1943) ===
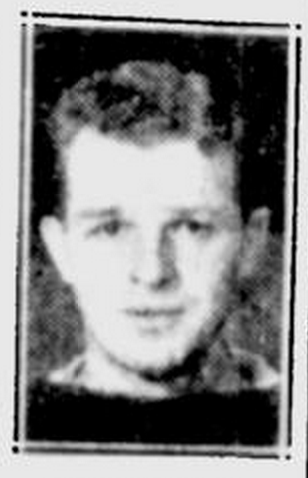
Smith, c. 1944

Smith began his NHL career with the Rangers with a short two-game stint in 1936–37, during which he notched his first NHL career goal. He quickly became an integral player on the Rangers roster, leading the team in scoring in his second full NHL season in 1938–39 with 41 points. Going the length of the campaign with just one minor penalty, he was also awarded the Lady Byng Trophy, his first of two in his career. The following season, he helped lead the Rangers to the Stanley Cup championship, defeating the Toronto Maple Leafs in six games (the win was the Rangers' last before their 54-year Cup drought, ending in 1994).

Despite winning the Stanley Cup that year, however, Smith's production began to tail off with the Rangers, scoring only 24 points that championship year. Despite improving to 33 points in 1942–43, Smith ended his 6-year tenure with the Rangers following that season.

=== Chicago Black Hawks (1943–1947) ===
Joining the Chicago Black Hawks in 1943–44, Smith rejuvenated his career playing on a line with future fellow Hockey Hall of Famers, Bill Mosienko and Doug Bentley. He recorded 23 goals and established an NHL record for single-season assists with 49 (broken the following season by Elmer Lach of the Montreal Canadiens) for an NHL career-high 72 points. The combined total of Mosienko, Bentley, and Smith's points that season also set an NHL record for a line with 219. Smith's record-setting season was complemented by a second Lady Byng Trophy, having only accumulated 4 penalty minutes.

The following season, in 1944–45, Smith succeeded Bentley Smith set another NHL record with a four-goal period against the Montreal Canadiens on March 4, 1945 (Smith shares the record with several other players). The remainder of Smith's four-season stay in Chicago was not met with as much offensive success as his initial campaign with the team, but he did, however, record three straight 20-goal seasons, including a personal best 26-goal season in 1945–46. After his production dipped to 26 points in 1946–47, he retired from the NHL.

=== Coaching in the minors (1947–1952) ===
Smith returned to the minor leagues in 1947–48, joining the short-lived United States Hockey League (USHL) with the Tulsa Oilers. He led Tulsa in scoring with 71 points in his only season while also serving as the team's head coach. Finishing in the top ten in league scoring, he won the Herman W. Paterson Cup as league MVP.

The following season, he also did double duty playing and coaching in St. Paul Saints, where he played for three seasons. In 1951–52, Smith joined the Cincinnati Mohawks of the AHL, coaching them to the second round of the Calder Cup playoffs and playing in a limited role, appearing in just 2 games. Smith retired following his one-season stint with the Mohawks both as a coach and player.

== Retirement ==
Following Smith's retirement, he returned to Vancouver, where he competed in the NWHL to play oldtimers hockey. He made his residence there and became a founding member of the British Columbia Hockey Benevolent Association, also known as the Canucks Alumni, and at one point held the position of president.

Thirty-nine years following his professional retirement, Smith was inducted into the Hockey Hall of Fame in 1991.

At the time of his death on June 15, 2008, Ray Getliffe, a left winger who played for the Boston Bruins and Montreal Canadiens was said to be the oldest living person to have played in the NHL. Later, it was reported that Smith was the oldest living person to have ever played in the NHL. Both these reports, however, overlooked players who had only played a limited number of games, such as Louis Holmes and Al Suomi. Getliffe, who died at the age of 94, was just several months younger than Smith at the time of his death, while Holmes and Suomi were 97 and 95, respectively at that time. On May 19, 2009, Smith died at the age of 95, leaving Suomi as the oldest living NHL player, at the current age of 99.

He was the last surviving member of Rangers 1940 Stanley Cup team.

In the 2009 book 100 Ranger Greats, the authors ranked Smith at No. 35 all-time of the 901 New York Rangers who had played during the team's first 82 seasons.

== Awards ==
- Won the Lady Byng Trophy in 1939 and 1944.
- Won a Stanley Cup with the New York Rangers in 1940.
- Won the Herman W. Paterson Cup as USHL MVP in 1948.

== Career statistics ==
			Regular season					Playoffs
Season	Team	League	GP	G	A	Pts	PIM	GP	G	A	Pts	PIM
1930–31	Saskatoon Wesleys	N-SJHL	1	0	0	0	0	2	0	0	0	0
1931–32	Saskatoon Wesleys	N-SJHL	4	5	1	6	0	9	6	1	7	2
1931–32	Saskatoon Crescents	N-SSHL	18	19	3	22	0	4	6	0	6	4
1932–33	Springfield Indians	CAHL	12	0	0	0	0	—	—	—	—	—
1932–33	Saskatoon Crescents	WCHL	27	7	6	13	8	—	—	—	—	—
1933–34	Vancouver Lions	NWHL	34	25	14	39	8	7	5	4	9	2
1934–35	Vancouver Lions	NWHL	32	22	22	44	2	8	3	5	8	4
1935–36	Vancouver Lions	NWHL	40	21	32	53	10	7	2	4	6	2
1936–37	New York Rangers	NHL	2	1	0	1	0	—	—	—	—	—
1936–37	Philadelphia Ramblers	IAHL	49	25	29	54	15	—	—	—	—	—
1937–38	New York Rangers	NHL	48	14	23	37	0	3	2	0	2	0
1938–39	New York Rangers	NHL	48	21	20	41	2	7	1	2	3	0
1939–40	New York Rangers	NHL	41	8	16	24	2	11	1	3	4	2
1940–41	New York Rangers	NHL	48	14	11	25	0	3	0	0	0	0
1941–42	New York Rangers	NHL	47	10	24	34	4	5	0	0	0	0
1942–43	New York Rangers	NHL	47	12	21	33	4	—	—	—	—	—
1943–44	Chicago Black Hawks	NHL	50	23	49	72	4	9	4	8	12	0
1944–45	Chicago Black Hawks	NHL	50	23	31	54	0	—	—	—	—	—
1945–46	Chicago Black Hawks	NHL	50	26	24	50	2	4	2	1	3	0
1946–47	Chicago Black Hawks	NHL	52	9	17	26	6	—	—	—	—	—
1947–48	Tulsa Oilers	USHL	64	38	33	71	10	2	0	1	1	0
1948–49	St. Paul Saints	USHL	2	2	0	2	2	—	—	—	—	—
1949–50	St. Paul Saints	USHL	21	7	15	22	2	2	0	0	0	2
1950–51	St. Paul Saints	USHL	23	3	9	12	0	—	—	—	—	—
1951–52	Cincinnati Mohawks	AHL	2	0	0	0	2	—	—	—	—	—
NHL totals			483	161	236	397	24	42	10	14	24	2

== Coaching statistics ==
Season	Team	League	Type	GP	W	L	T	OTL	Pct	Note
1947–48	Tulsa Oilers	USHL	Head coach	66	23	34	9	0	0.417	
1948–49	St. Paul Saints	USHL	Head coach	66	36	20	10	0	0.621	
1949–50	St. Paul Saints	USHL	Head coach	70	29	30	11	0	0.493	
1950–51	St. Paul Saints	USHL	Head coach	64	33	26	5	0	0.555	
1951–52	Cincinnati Mohawks	AHL	Head coach	68	29	33	6	0	0.471	Lost in round 2

== See also ==
- Captain (ice hockey)

Preceded by Doug Bentley	Chicago Black Hawks captain 1944–45	Succeeded by John Mariucci
Preceded by Gordie Drillon	Winner of the Lady Byng Trophy; 1939	Succeeded by Bobby Bauer
Preceded by Max Bentley	Winner of the Lady Byng Trophy; 1944	Succeeded by Bill Mosienko
