= Mike Karakas =

American ice hockey player

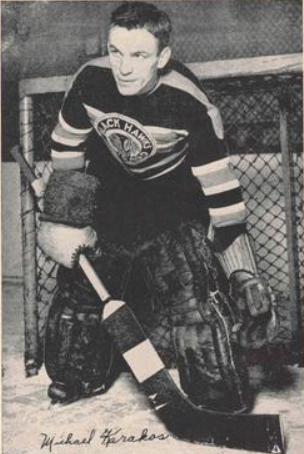
- Karakas with the Chicago Black Hawks in the 1940s
- Born: November 13, 1910 Aurora, Minnesota, U.S.
- Died: May 2, 1992 (aged 81) Wakefield Township, Minnesota, U.S.
- Height: 5 ft 11 in (180 cm)
- Weight: 147 lb (67 kg; 10 st 7 lb)
- Position: Goaltender
- Caught: Left
- Played for: Chicago Black Hawks
- Playing career: 1935–1946

Michael George Karakas (November 13, 1910 – May 2, 1992) was an American professional ice hockey goaltender in the National Hockey League (NHL). He was the league's first American-born and -trained goaltender. He played eight seasons with the Chicago Black Hawks and appeared in two Stanley Cup Finals. In 1938, he helped Chicago, who had a .411 winning percentage in the regular season, win the Stanley Cup, playing with a steel-toed boot on one foot in the last two games of the Finals after he had broken it in the last game of the Semi-finals. He is one of the charter members of the United States Hockey Hall of Fame.

== Biography ==
Undated photo of Karakas for Chicago Black Hawks

Karakas was born in Aurora, Minnesota, to a Greek American family, and grew up in nearby Eveleth. He and Frank Brimsek, who also became a goaltender in the NHL, were battery mates for their high school baseball team, with Karakas catching and Brimsek pitching.

Karakas played for the Chicago Black Hawks for eight seasons between 1935 and 1946. In his first season, he was awarded the Calder Memorial Trophy as the league's best rookie, after posting a 1.85 goals-against-average and nine shutouts in 48 games. He had been invited to play for the Black Hawks because their regular goaltender, Lorne Chabot, was injured. After posting four wins and three shutouts in four games, the Black Hawks made Karakas their starting goaltender; Chabot was later traded to the Montreal Maroons.

With Karakas the Black Hawks won the Stanley Cup in 1937–38, even though they finished the season with a losing record. The team's owner, Major Frederic McLaughlin, ordered his general manager to "ice [him] a team of all American players." After losing five of its six first games with an all-American roster, some Canadian players were added, and the team finished the season with a 14–25–9 record for a .411 winning percentage.

In the playoffs, Karakas suffered a broken toe just before the start of the Stanley Cup Finals against the Toronto Maple Leafs. The Black Hawks substituted Alfie Moore for Karakas in the first game. After the first game, Moore was ruled ineligible, and the Black Hawks lost the next game. Karakas returned with a steel-toed boot and won the next two games, leading the Black Hawks to the Stanley Cup. In that year's playoffs, Karakas had a 6–2 record, with two shutouts and a 1.71 goals-against-average.

After helping Chicago win the Stanley Cup in 1938, Karakas asked the team's owners for a US$500 raise. The owners turned him down, and Karakas spent most of the next five seasons in the American Hockey League (AHL). He returned to the Black Hawks full time in 1944 and spent two more seasons with them, then returned to the AHL for two more seasons before retiring.

Karakas had 28 shutouts in the regular season and three in the playoffs in his NHL career. In five of his eight seasons in Chicago Karakas appeared in all 48 games. In 1973, Karakas was named a charter member of the United States Hockey Hall of Fame, located in his hometown of Eveleth.

== Personal life ==
Karakas's younger brother Tommy played college hockey at Illinois, with whom he won a championship in 1943.

== Awards and achievements ==
- Selected to the AHA First All-Star Team in 1935.
- Calder Memorial Trophy winner in 1936.
- Stanley Cup champion in 1938.
- Calder Cup champion in 1940.
- Selected to the AHL First All-Star Team in 1941.
- Selected to the AHL Second All-Star Team in 1943.
- Selected to the NHL Second All-Star Team in 1945.
- Inducted into the United States Hockey Hall of Fame in 1973.

== Career statistics ==
=== Regular season and playoffs ===
			Regular season								Playoffs
Season	Team	League	GP	W	L	T	Min	GA	SO	GAA	GP	W	L	Min	GA	SO	GAA
1930–31	Chicago Shamrocks	AHA	8	5	2	0	435	16	0	2.21	—	—	—	—	—	—	—
1931–32	Chicago Shamrocks	AHA	45	29	11	5	2624	65	9	1.59	4	3	1	242	10	0	2.48
1932–33	St. Louis Flyers	AHA	43	23	19	1	2702	85	5	1.89	4	2	2	284	6	1	1.27
1933–34	Tulsa Oilers	AHA	48	23	25	0	2918	110	7	2.26	4	2	2	260	7	1	1.62
1934–35	Tulsa Oilers	AHA	41	20	17	4	2640	77	4	1.52	2	0	2	130	8	0	3.69
1935–36	Chicago Black Hawks	NHL	48	21	19	8	2990	92	9	1.85	2	1	1	120	7	0	3.50
1936–37	Chicago Black Hawks	NHL	48	14	27	7	2978	131	5	2.64	—	—	—	—	—	—	—
1937–38	Chicago Black Hawks	NHL	48	14	25	9	2980	139	1	2.80	8	6	2	525	15	2	1.71
1938–39	Chicago Black Hawks	NHL	48	12	28	8	2988	132	5	2.65	—	—	—	—	—	—	—
1939–40	Providence Reds	IAHL	14	7	5	2	860	43	1	3.00	8	6	2	545	21	2	2.31
1939–40	Chicago Black Hawks	NHL	17	7	9	1	1050	58	0	3.31	—	—	—	—	—	—	—
1939–40	Montreal Canadiens	NHL	5	0	4	1	310	18	0	3.48	—	—	—	—	—	—	—
1940–41	Providence Reds	AHL	56	31	21	4	3540	171	0	2.97	4	1	3	279	13	0	2.60
1941–42	Providence Reds	AHL	56	17	32	7	3470	237	1	4.10	—	—	—	—	—	—	—
1941–42	New Haven Eagles	AHL	1	0	1	0	60	7	0	7.00	—	—	—	—	—	—	—
1941–42	Springfield Indians	AHL	—	—	—	—	—	—	—	—	3	0	2	160	7	0	2.63
1942–43	Providence Reds	AHL	56	27	27	2	3430	216	2	3.78	2	0	2	130	7	0	3.23
1943–44	Providence Reds	AHL	24	6	15	3	1440	67	0	3.63	—	—	—	—	—	—	—
1943–44	Chicago Black Hawks	NHL	26	12	9	5	1560	79	3	3.04	9	4	5	549	24	1	2.62
1944–45	Chicago Black Hawks	NHL	48	12	29	7	2880	187	4	3.90	—	—	—	—	—	—	—
1945–46	Chicago Black Hawks	NHL	48	22	19	7	2880	166	1	3.46	4	0	4	240	26	0	6.50
1946–47	Providence Reds	AHL	62	21	31	10	3720	266	0	4.29	—	—	—	—	—	—	—
1947–48	Providence Reds	AHL	2	1	1	0	120	7	0	3.50	—	—	—	—	—	—	—
NHL totals			336	114	169	53	20,616	1002	28	2.92	23	11	12	1434	72	3	3.01

Preceded by Sweeney Schriner	NHL Rookie of the Year; 1936	Succeeded by Syl Apps
