= Jimmy Franks (ice hockey) =

Canadian ice hockey player

- Born: November 8, 1914; Melville, Saskatchewan, Canada
- Died: February 12, 1994 (aged 79)
- Height: 5 ft 11 in (180 cm)
- Weight: 156 lb (71 kg; 11 st 2 lb)
- Position: Goaltender
- Caught: Left
- Played for: Detroit Red Wings; New York Rangers; Boston Bruins
- Playing career: 1936–1945

James Reginald Franks (November 8, 1914 — February 12, 1994) was a Canadian ice hockey goaltender who played in the National Hockey League between 1937 and 1944 with the Detroit Red Wings, New York Rangers, and Boston Bruins.

== Early life ==
Franks was born in Melville, Saskatchewan. He played minor league hockey with the Pittsburgh Hornets.

== Career ==
Franks began his National Hockey League career with the Detroit Red Wings in 1937. He would also play with the New York Rangers and Boston Bruins. He retired after the 1943–44 season. Franks won a Stanley Cup with the 1937 Red Wings playing one playoff game due to Normie Smith being injured.

He also played several years in different minor leagues, mainly the American Hockey League, and retired in 1945.

== Career statistics ==
=== Regular season and playoffs ===
			Regular season								Playoffs
Season	Team	League	GP	W	L	T	Min	GA	SO	GAA	GP	W	L	T	Min	GA	SO	GAA
1932–33	Regina Pats	SJHL	2	—	—	—	120	3	0	1.50	2	2	0	0	120	0	2	0.00
1932–33	Regina Pats	M-Cup	—	—	—	—	—	—	—	—	13	7	3	3	840	10	0	0.77
1933–34	Melville Millionaires	SJHL	—	—	—	—	—	—	—	—	—	—	—	—	—	—	—	—
1934–35	Kerrobert Tigers	SAHA	—	—	—	—	—	—	—	—	—	—	—	—	—	—	—	—
1935–36	Prince Albert Mintos	N-SSHL	18	11	6	1	1110	70	1	3.78	3	2	1	0	180	7	0	2.33
1935–36	Prince Albert Mintos	Al-Cup	—	—	—	—	—	—	—	—	7	5	2	0	430	17	0	2.37
1936–37	Pittsburgh Hornets	IAHL	20	8	9	3	1230	57	1	2.78	—	—	—	—	—	—	—	—
1936–37	Detroit Red Wings	NHL	—	—	—	—	—	—	—	—	1	0	1	—	30	2	0	4.06
1937–38	Detroit Red Wings	NHL	1	1	0	0	60	3	0	3.00	—	—	—	—	—	—	—	—
1937–38	Pittsburgh Hornets	IAHL	9	3	4	2	560	24	1	2.57	—	—	—	—	—	—	—	—
1938–39	Pittsburgh Hornets	IAHL	33	16	14	3	2030	103	1	3.04	—	—	—	—	—	—	—	—
1938–39	Syracuse Stars	IAHL	1	0	0	1	70	3	0	2.57	—	—	—	—	—	—	—	—
1938–39	Kansas City Greyhounds	AHA	4	3	1	0	240	10	1	2.50	—	—	—	—	—	—	—	—
1939–40	Indianapolis Capitols	IAHL	29	16	7	6	1830	68	2	2.23	—	—	—	—	—	—	—	—
1940–41	Indianapolis Capitols	AHL	56	17	28	11	3500	168	1	2.88	—	—	—	—	—	—	—	—
1941–42	Omaha Knights	AHA	39	19	14	6	2397	116	1	2.90	8	8	0	0	497	16	0	1.93
1942–43	New York Rangers	NHL	23	5	14	4	1380	103	0	4.48	—	—	—	—	—	—	—	—
1942–43	Pittsburgh Hornets	AHL	4	1	3	0	240	19	0	4.45	—	—	—	—	—	—	—	—
1943–44	Detroit Red Wings	NHL	17	6	8	3	1020	69	1	4.06	—	—	—	—	—	—	—	—
1943–44	Boston Bruins	NHL	1	0	1	0	60	6	0	6.00	—	—	—	—	—	—	—	—
1943–44	Buffalo Bisons	AHL	1	1	0	0	60	1	0	1.00	—	—	—	—	—	—	—	—
1944–45	Buffalo Bisons	AHL	1	0	0	1	60	2	0	2.00	—	—	—	—	—	—	—	—
1944–45	St. Louis Flyers	AHL	29	5	21	3	1740	115	1	3.97	—	—	—	—	—	—	—	—
NHL totals			42	12	23	7	2520	181	1	4.31	1	0	1	—	30	2	0	4.06
