= Bert Gardiner =

Canadian ice hockey player

- Born: March 25, 1913 Saskatoon, Saskatchewan, Canada
- Died: August 28, 2001 (aged 88) Los Angeles, California, USA
- Height: 5 ft 11 in (180 cm)
- Weight: 171 lb (78 kg; 12 st 3 lb)
- Position: Goaltender
- Caught: Left
- Played for: Montreal Canadiens; Chicago Black Hawks; Boston Bruins; New York Rangers.
- Playing career: 1934–1944

Wilbert Homer Gardiner (March 25, 1913 – August 28, 2001) was a Canadian professional ice hockey player who played 144 games in the National Hockey League between 1935 and 1944. He played with the Montreal Canadiens, Chicago Black Hawks, Boston Bruins, and New York Rangers.

== Career statistics ==
=== Regular season and playoffs ===
			Regular season								Playoffs
Season	Team	League	GP	W	L	T	Min	GA	SO	GAA	GP	W	L	Min	GA	SO	GAA
1931–32	Saskatoon Mercurys	SCJHL	3	1	2	0	210	18	0	5.14	—	—	—	—	—	—	—
1931–32	Calgary Jimmies	CCJHL	2	2	0	0	120	2	0	2.00	—	—	—	—	—	—	—
1931–32	Calgary Jimmies	M-Cup	—	—	—	—	—	—	—	—	5	2	3	300	11	0	2.20
1932–33	Calgary Jimmies	CCJHL	2	2	0	0	120	2	0	1.00	—	—	—	—	—	—	—
1932–33	Calgary Jimmies	M-Cup	—	—	—	—	—	—	—	—	7	5	2	420	16	1	2.29
1933–34	Saskatoon Elites	N-SSHL	14	6	7	1	910	53	0	3.49	4	3	1	240	8	1	2.00
1934–35	New York Crescents	EAHL	21	15	5	1	1260	35	6	1.67	8	7	1	560	13	1	1.39
1935–36	New York Rangers	NHL	1	1	0	0	60	1	0	1.00	—	—	—	—	—	—	—
1935–36	Philadelphia Ramblers	Can-Am	45	26	16	3	2760	94	5	2.04	4	3	1	265	4	1	0.91
1936–37	Philadelphia Ramblers	IAHL	49	28	13	8	3020	104	4	2.07	6	3	3	360	15	2	2.50
1937–38	Philadelphia Ramblers	IAHL	48	26	18	4	2950	108	8	2.20	5	3	2	369	10	2	1.63
1938–39	Philadelphia Ramblers	IAHL	52	32	16	4	3230	150	2	2.79	—	—	—	—	—	—	—
1938–39	New York Rangers	NHL	—	—	—	—	—	—	—	—	6	3	3	434	12	0	1.66
1939–40	Philadelphia Ramblers	IAHL	54	15	31	8	3350	170	4	3.04	—	—	—	—	—	—	—
1939–40	New Haven Eagles	IAHL	3	3	0	0	180	4	1	1.67	—	—	—	—	—	—	—
1940–41	Montreal Canadiens	NHL	42	13	23	6	2600	119	1	2.75	3	1	2	214	8	0	2.24
1941–42	Montreal Canadiens	NHL	10	1	8	1	620	42	0	4.06	—	—	—	—	—	—	—
1941–42	Washington Lions	AHL	34	12	19	3	2080	99	4	2.86	2	0	2	120	7	0	3.50
1942–43	Chicago Black Hawks	NHL	50	17	18	15	3020	180	1	3.58	—	—	—	—	—	—	—
1943–44	Boston Bruins	NHL	41	17	19	5	2460	212	1	5.17	—	—	—	—	—	—	—
NHL totals			144	49	68	27	8760	554	3	3.79	9	4	5	0	648	20	0	1.85
