= Phil Watson =

Canadian ice hockey player and coach (1914—1991)

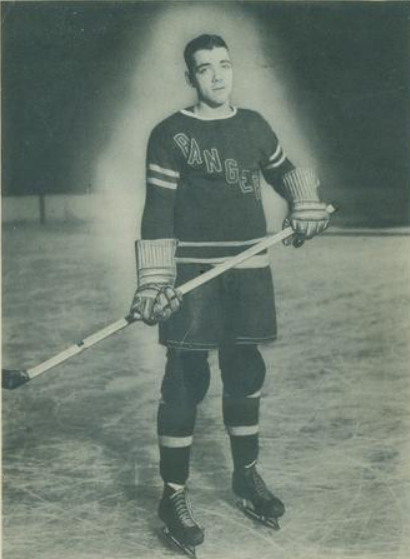
- Watson in 1939
- Born: April 24, 1914 Montreal, Quebec, Canada
- Died: February 1, 1991 (aged 76) Vancouver, British Columbia, Canada
- Height: 5 ft 11 in (180 cm)
- Weight: 165 lb (75 kg; 11 st 11 lb)
- Position: Right wing
- Shot: Right
- Played for: Montreal Canadiens; New York Rangers
- Playing career: 1935–1948

Joseph Philippe Henri Watson (April 24, 1914 — February 1, 1991) was a Canadian professional ice hockey player and coach in the National Hockey League. He played for the Montreal Canadiens and New York Rangers between 1936 and 1948, and coached the Rangers from 1955 to 1960 and the Boston Bruins from 1961 to 1963. He was born in Montreal, Quebec.

== Coaching career ==
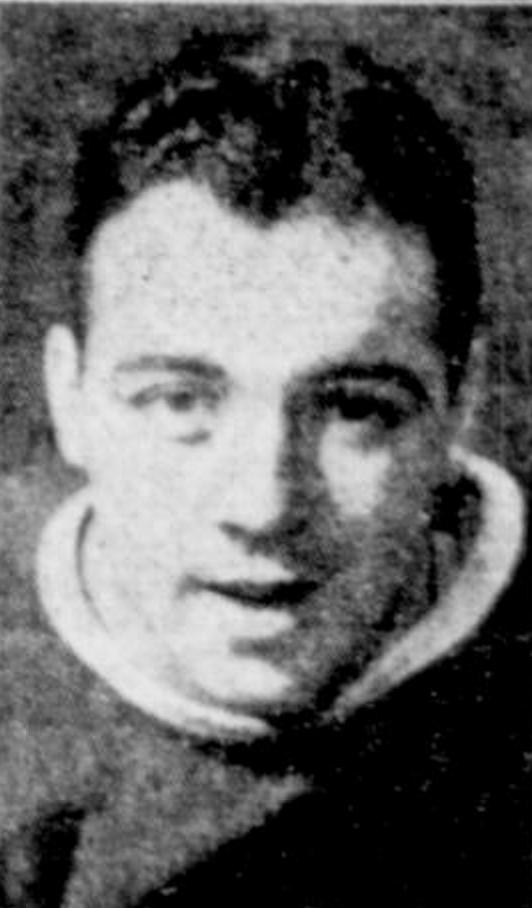
Watson in undated photo

Watson coached hockey after retiring as a player. He was head coach of:

- New York Rovers QSHL/EAHL 1948–1951
- Quebec Citadelles QJHL 1951–1955
- New York Rangers NHL 1955–56 and 1959–60
- Providence Reds AHL 1960–1961
- Boston Bruins NHL 1961–1963
- Buffalo Bisons AHL 1964–1966
- Quebec Aces AHL 1966–1967
- Chicoutimi Saguenéens QPSHL 1968–69
- Sorel Éperviers QJHL 1969–70
- Syracuse Blazers EHL 1970–71
- Philadelphia Blazers WHA 1972-73

While coaching the Quebec Citadelles during the 1953 Quebec Junior Hockey League playoffs final versus the Montreal Junior Canadiens, Watson was involved in a physical altercation with spectators following a last-minute game-winning goal by Montreal. The league suspended Watson for one game and required his team to post a $500 good behaviour bond. Instead of resuming the series, the Citadelles withdrew from the Quebec Amateur Hockey Association, and were reinstated by the Canadian Amateur Hockey Association to partake in the 1953 Memorial Cup playoffs.

== Awards and achievements ==
- 1940 Stanley Cup Final champion (New York Rangers)
- 1944 Stanley Cup Final champion (Montreal Canadiens)

== Personal life ==
He married a model named Helen Anderson on March 29, 1939 in New York.

== Legacy ==
In the 2009 book 100 Ranger Greats, Watson was ranked No. 76 all-time of the 901 New York Rangers who had played during the team's first 82 seasons.

== Career statistics ==
=== Regular season and playoffs ===
			Regular season					Playoffs
Season	Team	League	GP	G	A	Pts	PIM	GP	G	A	Pts	PIM
1932–33	Montreal St. Francis Xavier	MCJHL	11	10	5	15	16	2	0	0	0	0
1933–34	Montreal St. Francis Xavier	MCJHL	16	7	6	13	14	—	—	—	—	—
1934–35	Montreal Jr. Royals	QJHL	19	7	7	14	24	7	1	2	3	4
1935–36	New York Rangers	NHL	24	0	2	2	24	—	—	—	—	—
1935–36	Philadelphia Ramblers	Can-Am	22	9	5	14	32	—	—	—	—	—
1936–37	New York Rangers	NHL	48	11	17	28	22	9	0	2	2	9
1937–38	New York Rangers	NHL	48	7	25	32	52	3	0	2	2	0
1938–39	New York Rangers	NHL	48	15	22	37	42	7	1	1	2	7
1939–40	New York Rangers	NHL	48	7	28	35	42	12	3	6	9	16
1940–41	New York Rangers	NHL	40	11	25	36	49	3	0	2	2	9
1941–42	New York Rangers	NHL	48	15	37	52	58	6	1	4	5	8
1942–43	New York Rangers	NHL	46	14	28	42	44	—	—	—	—	—
1943–44	Montreal Canadiens	NHL	44	17	32	49	61	9	3	5	8	16
1944–45	New York Rangers	NHL	45	11	8	19	24	—	—	—	—	—
1945–46	New York Rangers	NHL	49	12	14	26	43	—	—	—	—	—
1946–47	New York Rangers	NHL	48	6	12	18	17	—	—	—	—	—
1947–48	New York Rangers	NHL	54	18	15	33	54	5	2	3	5	2
NHL totals			590	144	265	409	532	54	10	25	35	67

== Coaching record ==
Team	Year	Regular season						Post season			
Team	Year	G	W	L	T	Pts	Finish	W	L	Pct.	Result
NYR	1955–56	70	32	28	10	74	3rd in NHL	1	4	.200	Lost in semi-finals (MTL)
NYR	1956–57	70	26	30	14	66	4th in NHL	1	4	.200	Lost in semi-finals (MTL)
NYR	1957–58	70	32	25	13	77	2nd in NHL	2	4	.333	Lost in semi-finals (BOS)
NYR	1958–59	70	26	32	12	64	5th in NHL	—	—	—	Missed playoffs
NYR	1959–60	15	3	9	3	9	(fired)	—	—	—	Missed playoffs
BOS	1961–62	70	15	47	8	38	6th in NHL	—	—	—	Missed playoffs
BOS	1962–63	14	1	8	5	7	(fired)	—	—	—	Missed playoffs
PHI (WHA)	1972–73	71	37	34	0	74	3rd in East Division	0	4	.000	Lost in Quarterfinals (CLE)
VAN (WHA)	1973–74	12	3	9	0	6	(fired)	—	—	—	Missed playoffs
NHL Total		379	135	179	65	335		4	12	.250	3 playoff appearances
WHA Total		83	40	43	0	80		0	4	.000	1 playoff appearance

Preceded by Muzz Patrick	Head coach of the New York Rangers; 1955–59	Succeeded by Muzz Patrick
Preceded by Milt Schmidt	Head coach of the Boston Bruins; 1961–62	Succeeded by Milt Schmidt
