= Bill Durnan =

Canadian ice hockey player (1916–1972)

- Hockey Hall of Fame, 1964
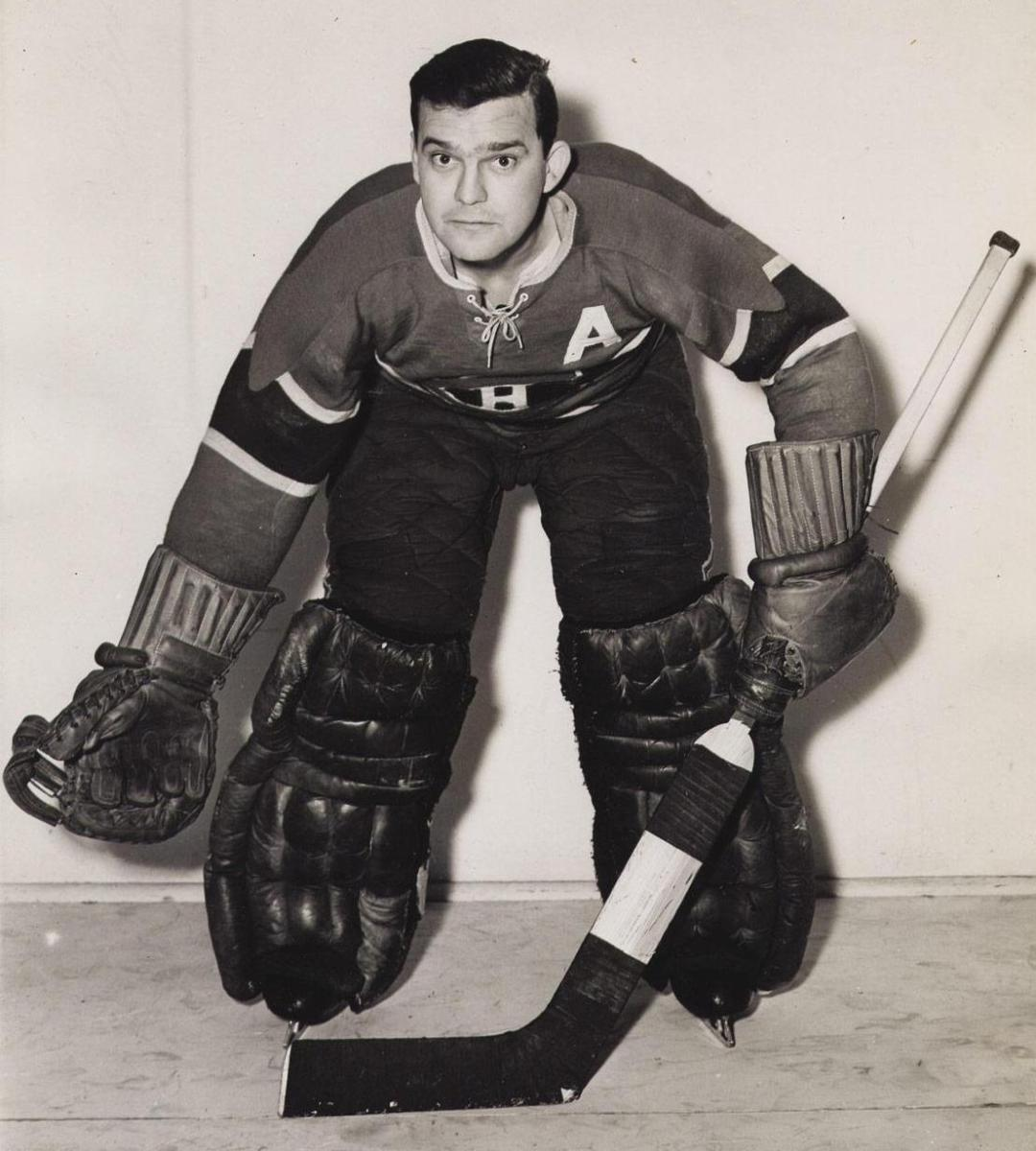
- Durnan with the Montreal Canadiens in 1944
- Born: January 22, 1916 Toronto, Ontario, Canada
- Died: October 31, 1972 (aged 56) North York, Ontario, Canada
- Height: 6 ft 0 in (183 cm)
- Weight: 190 lb (86 kg; 13 st 8 lb)
- Position: Goaltender
- Caught: Right/Left
- Played for: Montreal Canadiens
- Playing career: 1943–1950

William Ronald Durnan (January 22, 1916 – October 31, 1972) was a Canadian professional ice hockey goaltender who played with the Montreal Canadiens in the National Hockey League (NHL) between 1943 and 1950. He was one of the best goaltenders in his time, winning the Vezina Trophy for fewest goals allowed six times, being named First All-Star team as best goaltender six times, and helping the Canadiens win the Stanley Cup twice. Durnan retired in 1950, citing the stress of playing professional hockey. However, in his final season he suffered a severe laceration of the scalp, but was only sidelined 12 days and returned heroically for the playoffs. When the series was all but lost (down 0-3 to the Rangers), he stepped away from the game. He served as the captain of the Canadiens in 1948, the last goaltender to be allowed to do so. In 1964 Durnan was inducted into the Hockey Hall of Fame, and in 2017 he was named one of the '100 Greatest NHL Players' in history.

== Playing career ==
Durnan entered the National Hockey League at the age of 27 and played only seven seasons, but accomplished much in his short NHL career. He won the Vezina Trophy for allowing the fewest goals against in each of his first four seasons, from 1943–44 to 1946–47, becoming the first to capture the award in four consecutive seasons. The Montreal Canadiens fared poorly in 1947–48 and Turk Broda of the Toronto Maple Leafs won it that year instead. Durnan and the Canadiens, however, returned to form the next two seasons, and he won the Vezina twice more, in 1948–49 and 1949–50. He was also selected to the First All-Star Team six times during his career, including four consecutive selections from 1944 to 1947.

During the 1947–48 season, Durnan served as the Canadiens' captain. However, he left the crease so often to argue calls that other teams claimed he was giving the Canadiens unscheduled timeouts. After the season, the NHL passed a rule barring goaltenders from performing as captain, known as the "Durnan Rule."

Durnan set a long-standing modern NHL record between February 26 and March 6, 1949, when he registered four consecutive shutouts and did not allow a goal over a span of 309 minutes, 21 seconds. This record stood until 2004, when Brian Boucher of the Phoenix Coyotes recorded five straight shutouts and 332 minutes, 1 second without being scored upon. Durnan was ranked 5th all-time in career wins, shutouts and GAA.

Durnan retired following the 1949–50 NHL season at the age of 34, due to injuries (severe scalp laceration and infection that turned into a staph infection throughout the playoffs and afterwards, after taking a shot in the eye in preseason and various other minor injuries; and the previous season suffering a severe knee injury that still hampered him 20 years after he retired) and being no longer able to stand the stress of playing professional hockey. He went into coaching, most notably with the Ottawa Senators of the QSHL in 1950–51, and the Kitchener-Waterloo Dutchmen of the OHA in 1958–59.

Durnan was inducted into the Hockey Hall of Fame in 1964. In 383 regular-season games, he recorded 208 wins, 112 losses, 34 shutouts and a 2.36 goals-against average. In 45 playoff games he had 27 wins, 12 losses, two shutouts and a 2.07 average. Before he entered the NHL he won the 1940 Allan Cup with the Kirkland Lake Blue Devils.

== Playing style ==
Durnan was an ambidextrous goalie, equally adept at catching and stickhandling with either hand; he wore gloves designed to let him switch hands instantly. He was a stand-up goaltender due to his relatively tall stature for his time.

== Personal life ==
Durnan was born and raised in Toronto. He was married to Mandy Durnan, originally Mandy Kant (born 1915).

Durnan died of kidney failure on October 31, 1972. He suffered from diabetes in his last years and his health had been failing steadily.

The Aréna Bill-Durnan, a community ice rink, is located in the Côte-des-Neiges–Notre-Dame-de-Grâce borough of Montreal.

== Awards ==
- Allan Cup champion in 1940.
- NHL first All-Star team goalie in 1944, 1945, 1946, 1947, 1949, 1950.
- Won the Vezina Trophy in 1944, 1945, 1946, 1947, 1949, 1950.
- Played in NHL All-Star Game in 1947, 1948, 1949.
- Stanley Cup champion in 1944, 1946.
- Inducted into the Hockey Hall of Fame in 1964.
- Inducted into the Canada's Sports Hall of Fame in 1986.
- In 1998, he was ranked number 34 on The Hockey News' list of the 100 Greatest Hockey Players.
- In January, 2017, Durnan was named one of the '100 Greatest NHL Players' in history.

== Career statistics ==
=== Regular season and playoffs ===
			Regular season								Playoffs
Season	Team	League	GP	W	L	T	Min	GA	SO	GAA	GP	W	L	T	Min	GA	SO	GAA
1931–32	North Toronto Juniors	TJHL	8	—	—	—	480	17	1	2.12	4	—	—	—	240	10	1	2.50
1932–33	Sudbury Wolves	NOHA	6	—	—	—	360	6	2	1.00	2	—	—	—	120	4	0	2.00
1933–34	Toronto Torontos	TIHL	11	—	—	—	660	21	4	1.91	1	0	1	0	60	5	0	5.00
1933–34	Toronto British Consol	TMHL	15	12	2	1	910	31	1	2.04	5	0	2	3	350	21	0	3.60
1933–34	Toronto All-Stars	TIHL	2	—	—	—	120	9	0	4.50	—	—	—	—	—	—	—	—
1934–35	Toronto McColl	TMHL	15	—	—	—	900	62	0	4.13	—	—	—	—	—	—	—	—
1935–36	Toronto Dominions	TMHL	1	0	1	0	60	6	0	6.00	—	—	—	—	—	—	—	—
1936–37	Kirkland Lake Blue Devils	NOHA	4	4	0	0	240	5	0	1.25	4	1	0	3	240	8	1	2.00
1937–38	Kirkland Lake Blue Devils	NOHA	11	8	1	1	610	27	1	2.66	2	2	0	0	120	2	1	1.00
1937–38	Kirkland Lake Blue Devils	Al-Cup	—	—	—	—	—	—	—	—	2	0	2	0	120	11	0	3.50
1938–39	Kirkland Lake Blue Devils	NOHA	7	7	0	0	420	7	3	1.00	2	2	0	0	120	3	1	1.50
1938–39	Kirkland Lake Blue Devils	Al-Cup	—	—	—	—	—	—	—	—	5	3	2	0	299	12	2	2.41
1939–40	Kirkland Lake Blue Devils	Exhib.	6	—	—	—	360	12	1	2.00	2	2	0	0	120	3	1	1.50
1939–40	Kirkland Lake Blue Devils	Al-Cup	—	—	—	—	—	—	—	—	17	14	1	2	1040	35	1	2.02
1940–41	Montreal Royals	QSHL	34	—	—	—	2000	100	1	3.00	8	8	0	0	480	24	1	3.00
1940–41	Montreal Royals	Al-Cup	—	—	—	—	—	—	—	—	14	8	5	1	850	49	1	3.46
1941–42	Montreal Royals	QSHL	39	—	—	—	2340	143	0	3.67	—	—	—	—	—	—	—	—
1942–43	Montreal Royals	QSHL	31	—	—	—	1860	130	0	4.19	4	—	—	—	240	11	0	2.75
1943–44	Montreal Canadiens	NHL	50	38	5	7	3000	109	2	2.18	9	8	1	—	549	14	1	1.53
1944–45	Montreal Canadiens	NHL	50	38	8	4	3000	121	1	2.42	6	2	4	—	373	15	0	2.41
1945–46	Montreal Canadiens	NHL	40	24	11	5	2400	104	4	2.60	9	8	1	—	581	20	0	2.07
1946–47	Montreal Canadiens	NHL	60	34	16	10	3600	138	4	2.30	11	6	5	—	720	23	1	1.92
1947–48	Montreal Canadiens	NHL	59	20	28	10	3505	162	5	2.77	—	—	—	—	—	—	—	—
1948–49	Montreal Canadiens	NHL	60	28	23	9	3600	126	10	2.10	7	3	4	—	468	17	0	2.18
1949–50	Montreal Canadiens	NHL	64	26	21	17	3840	141	8	2.20	3	0	3	—	180	10	0	3.33
NHL totals			383	208	112	62	22,945	901	34	2.36	45	27	18	—	2871	99	2	2.07

== See also ==
- List of members of the Hockey Hall of Fame

Preceded by Toe Blake	Montreal Canadiens captain 1948	Succeeded by Emile Bouchard
Preceded by Johnny Mowers	Winner of the Vezina Trophy; 1944, 1945, 1946, 1947	Succeeded by Turk Broda
Preceded by Turk Broda	Winner of the Vezina Trophy; 1949, 1950	Succeeded by Al Rollins
