= 1942–43 Toronto Maple Leafs season =

NHL hockey team season

1942–43 Toronto Maple Leafs
- League: 3rd NHL
- 1942–43 record: 22–19–9
- Home record: 17–6–2
- Road record: 5–13–7
- Goals for: 198
- Goals against: 159

Team information
- General manager: Conn Smythe
- Coach: Hap Day
- Captain: Syl Apps
- Arena: Maple Leaf Gardens

Team leaders
- Goals: Lorne Carr (27)
- Assists: Billy Taylor (42)
- Points: Lorne Carr (60); Billy Taylor (60)
- Penalty minutes: Reg Hamilton (68)
- Wins: Turk Broda (22)
- Goals against average: Turk Broda (3.18)

The 1942–43 Toronto Maple Leafs season was Toronto's 26th season in the National Hockey League (NHL).

== Regular season ==
=== Final standings ===
National Hockey League
		GP	W	L	T	GF	GA	DIFF	Pts
1	Detroit Red Wings	50	25	14	11	169	124	+45	61
2	Boston Bruins	50	24	17	9	195	176	+19	57
3	Toronto Maple Leafs	50	22	19	9	198	159	+39	53
4	Montreal Canadiens	50	19	19	12	181	191	−10	50
5	Chicago Black Hawks	50	17	18	15	179	180	−1	49
6	New York Rangers	50	11	31	8	161	253	−92	30

=== Record vs. opponents ===
1942–43 NHL Records
Team	BOS	CHI	DET	MTL	NYR	TOR
Boston	—	3–4–3	4–4–2	5–4–1	8–2	4–3–3
Chicago	4–3–3	—	2–4–4	1–4–5	4–4–2	6–3–1
Detroit	4–4–2	4–2–4	—	5–3–2	7–1–2	5–4–1
Montreal	4–5–1	4–1–5	3–5–2	—	6–2–2	2–6–2
New York	2–8	4–4–2	1–7–2	2–6–2	—	2–6–2
Toronto	3–4–3	3–6–1	4–5–1	6–2–2	6–2–2	—

== Schedule and results ==
1942–43 regular season
October

Game	Result	Date	Score	Opponent	Record
1	W	October 31	7–2	New York Rangers (1942–43)	1–0–0

November

Game	Result	Date	Score	Opponent	Record
2	W	November 7	5–2	Detroit Red Wings (1942–43)	2–0–0
3	W	November 12	3–1	Boston Bruins (1942–43)	3–0–0
4	L	November 14	3–4	Chicago Black Hawks (1942–43)	3–1–0
5	L	November 15	4–5	@ Chicago Black Hawks (1942–43)	3–2–0
6	W	November 19	7–3	@ New York Rangers (1942–43)	4–2–0
7	W	November 21	8–0	Montreal Canadiens (1942–43)	5–2–0
8	L	November 22	6–7	@ Boston Bruins (1942–43)	5–3–0
9	L	November 26	1–2	@ Detroit Red Wings (1942–43)	5–4–0
10	W	November 28	8–6	New York Rangers (1942–43)	6–4–0
11	L	November 29	2–3	@ Chicago Black Hawks (1942–43)	6–5–0

December

Game	Result	Date	Score	Opponent	Record
12	L	December 3	2–4	@ Montreal Canadiens (1942–43)	6–6–0
13	W	December 5	9–1	Montreal Canadiens (1942–43)	7–6–0
14	T	December 6	2–2	@ Detroit Red Wings (1942–43)	7–6–1
15	W	December 10	7–2	Chicago Black Hawks (1942–43)	8–6–1
16	W	December 12	5–4	Detroit Red Wings (1942–43)	9–6–1
17	L	December 13	2–5	@ Chicago Black Hawks (1942–43)	9–7–1
18	W	December 17	8–1	@ Montreal Canadiens (1942–43)	10–7–1
19	T	December 19	3–3	Boston Bruins (1942–43)	10–7–2
20	W	December 20	8–2	@ New York Rangers (1942–43)	11–7–2
21	T	December 22	4–4	@ Boston Bruins (1942–43)	11–7–3
22	W	December 26	7–2	Boston Bruins (1942–43)	12–7–3
23	L	December 27	1–3	@ New York Rangers (1942–43)	12–8–3

January

Game	Result	Date	Score	Opponent	Record
24	W	January 2	6–3	Montreal Canadiens (1942–43)	13–8–3
25	T	January 3	4–4	@ Montreal Canadiens (1942–43)	13–8–4
26	L	January 9	0–4	Detroit Red Wings (1942–43)	13–9–4
27	L	January 10	4–5	@ Boston Bruins (1942–43)	13–10–4
28	W	January 16	8–4	Montreal Canadiens (1942–43)	14–10–4
29	L	January 17	0–2	@ Montreal Canadiens (1942–43)	14–11–4
30	W	January 21	7–4	New York Rangers (1942–43)	15–11–4
31	W	January 23	5–3	Chicago Black Hawks (1942–43)	16–11–4
32	L	January 30	3–5	Boston Bruins (1942–43)	16–12–4
33	T	January 31	3–3	@ Chicago Black Hawks (1942–43)	16–12–5

February

Game	Result	Date	Score	Opponent	Record
34	L	February 4	2–3	Detroit Red Wings (1942–43)	16–13–5
35	W	February 6	3–2	New York Rangers (1942–43)	17–13–5
36	L	February 7	3–5	@ Detroit Red Wings (1942–43)	17–14–5
37	L	February 9	1–3	@ Boston Bruins (1942–43)	17–15–5
38	W	February 13	3–2	Chicago Black Hawks (1942–43)	18–15–5
39	T	February 14	4–4	@ New York Rangers (1942–43)	18–15–6
40	W	February 20	4–2	Boston Bruins (1942–43)	19–15–6
41	L	February 21	0–5	@ Chicago Black Hawks (1942–43)	19–16–6
42	L	February 27	1–4	Chicago Black Hawks (1942–43)	19–17–6
43	W	February 28	4–2	@ Montreal Canadiens (1942–43)	20–17–6

March

Game	Result	Date	Score	Opponent	Record
44	L	March 2	0–4	New York Rangers (1942–43)	20–18–6
45	T	March 6	2–2	Montreal Canadiens (1942–43)	20–18–7
46	T	March 7	5–5	@ New York Rangers (1942–43)	20–18–8
47	T	March 9	5–5	@ Boston Bruins (1942–43)	20–18–9
48	L	March 11	1–2	@ Detroit Red Wings (1942–43)	20–19–9
49	W	March 13	3–1	Detroit Red Wings (1942–43)	21–19–9
50	W	March 14	5–3	@ Detroit Red Wings (1942–43)	22–19–9

Legend: Win (2 points) Loss (0 points) Tie (1 point)

== Player statistics ==
=== Regular season ===
Scoring

Player	Pos	GP	G	A	Pts	PIM
Lorne Carr	RW	50	27	33	60	15
Billy Taylor	C	50	18	42	60	2
Gaye Stewart	LW	48	24	23	47	20
Mel Hill	RW	49	17	27	44	47
Syl Apps	C	29	23	17	40	2
Babe Pratt	D	40	12	25	37	44
Sweeney Schriner	LW	37	19	17	36	13
Bob Davidson	LW	50	13	23	36	20
Bud Poile	RW	48	16	19	35	24
Reg Hamilton	D	48	4	17	21	68
Jack McLean	C/RW	27	9	8	17	33
Jack Forsey	RW	19	7	9	16	10
Bucko McDonald	D	40	2	11	13	39
Bob Copp	D	38	3	9	12	24
Hank Goldup	LW	8	1	7	8	4
Jackie Hamilton	C	13	1	6	7	4
Shep Mayer	RW	12	1	2	3	4
George Boothman	C/D	9	1	1	2	4
Rhys Thomson	D	18	0	2	2	22
Ab DeMarco	C	4	0	1	1	0
Johnny Ingoldsby	RW/D	8	0	1	1	0
Ted Kennedy	C	2	0	1	1	0
Turk Broda	G	50	0	0	0	0
Buck Jones	D	16	0	0	0	22

Goaltending

Player	MIN	GP	W	L	T	GA	GAA	SO
Turk Broda	3000	50	22	19	9	159	3.18	1
Team:	3000	50	22	19	9	159	3.18	1

=== Playoffs ===
Scoring

Player	Pos	GP	G	A	Pts	PIM
Bud Poile	RW	6	2	4	6	4
Jack McLean	C/RW	6	2	2	4	2
Sweeney Schriner	LW	4	2	2	4	0
Billy Taylor	C	6	2	2	4	0
Mel Hill	RW	6	3	0	3	0
Lorne Carr	RW	6	1	2	3	0
Bob Davidson	LW	6	1	2	3	7
Babe Pratt	D	6	1	2	3	8
Jackie Hamilton	C	6	1	1	2	0
Reg Hamilton	D	6	1	1	2	9
Gaye Stewart	LW	4	0	2	2	4
Bucko McDonald	D	6	1	0	1	4
Jack Forsey	RW	3	0	1	1	0
Turk Broda	G	6	0	0	0	0
Buck Jones	D	6	0	0	0	8
Joe Klukay	LW	1	0	0	0	0

Goaltending

Player	MIN	GP	W	L	GA	GAA	SO
Turk Broda	439	6	2	4	20	2.73	0
Team:	439	6	2	4	20	2.73	0

Note:

Pos = Position;GP = Games played; G = Goals; A = Assists; Pts = Points; PIM = Penalty minutes; +/- = Plus/minus; PPG = Power-play goals; SHG = Short-handed goals; GWG = Game-winning goals
Pos = Position;GP = Games played; Min, TOI = Minutes played; W = Wins; L = Losses; T,T/OT = Ties; OTL = Overtime losses; GA = Goals-against; GAA = Goals-against average; SO = Shutouts; SA = Shots against; SV = Shots saved;SV% = Save percentage;

== Transactions ==
- September 11, 1942: Acquired Rhys Thomson from the Brooklyn Americans in Special Dispersal Draft
- October 1, 1942: Signed Benny Grant as a War-Time Replacement
- October 4, 1942: Traded Gordie Drillon to the Montreal Canadiens for $30,000
- October 9, 1942: Acquired Mel Hill from the Brooklyn Americans in Special Dispersal Draft
- November 7, 1942: Acquired Ross Johnstone from the Buffalo Bisons of the AHL for cash
- November 18, 1942: Signed Free Agent Johnny Ingoldsby
- November 27, 1942: Acquired Babe Pratt from the New York Rangers for Red Garrett and Hank Goldup
- February 3, 1943: Acquired Buck Jones and loan of Ab DeMarco from the Providence Reds of the AHL for loan of George Boothman and loan of Jack Forsey
- February 28, 1943: Acquired Ted Kennedy from the Montreal Canadiens for Frank Eddolls
- March 15, 1943: Signed Free Agent Joe Klukay
