= 1942–43 Boston Bruins season =

NHL team season

1942–43 Boston Bruins
- League: 2nd NHL
- 1942–43 record: 24–17–9
- Home record: 17–3–5
- Road record: 7–14–4
- Goals for: 195
- Goals against: 176

Team information
- General manager: Art Ross
- Coach: Art Ross
- Captain: Dit Clapper
- Arena: Boston Garden

Team leaders
- Goals: Bill Cowley (27)
- Assists: Bill Cowley (45)
- Points: Bill Cowley (72)
- Penalty minutes: Murph Chamberlain (67)
- Wins: Frank Brimsek (24)
- Goals against average: Frank Brimsek (3.52)

The 1942–43 Boston Bruins season was the Bruins' 19th season in the NHL.

== Regular season ==
=== Final standings ===
National Hockey League
		GP	W	L	T	GF	GA	DIFF	Pts
1	Detroit Red Wings	50	25	14	11	169	124	+45	61
2	Boston Bruins	50	24	17	9	195	176	+19	57
3	Toronto Maple Leafs	50	22	19	9	198	159	+39	53
4	Montreal Canadiens	50	19	19	12	181	191	−10	50
5	Chicago Black Hawks	50	17	18	15	179	180	−1	49
6	New York Rangers	50	11	31	8	161	253	−92	30

=== Record vs. opponents ===
1942–43 NHL Records
Team	BOS	CHI	DET	MTL	NYR	TOR
Boston	—	3–4–3	4–4–2	5–4–1	8–2	4–3–3
Chicago	4–3–3	—	2–4–4	1–4–5	4–4–2	6–3–1
Detroit	4–4–2	4–2–4	—	5–3–2	7–1–2	5–4–1
Montreal	4–5–1	4–1–5	3–5–2	—	6–2–2	2–6–2
New York	2–8	4–4–2	1–7–2	2–6–2	—	2–6–2
Toronto	3–4–3	3–6–1	4–5–1	6–2–2	6–2–2	—

== Schedule and results ==
1942–43 regular season
October

Game	Result	Date	Score	Opponent	Record
1	L	October 31, 1942	2–3	@ Montreal Canadiens (1942–43)	0–1–0

November

Game	Result	Date	Score	Opponent	Record
2	L	November 1, 1942	0–3	@ Detroit Red Wings (1942–43)	0–2–0
3	L	November 5, 1942	1–5	@ Chicago Black Hawks (1942–43)	0–3–0
4	L	November 12, 1942	1–3	@ Toronto Maple Leafs (1942–43)	0–4–0
5	W	November 14, 1942	5–3	New York Rangers (1942–43)	1–4–0
6	W	November 15, 1942	4–3	@ New York Rangers (1942–43)	2–4–0
7	W	November 17, 1942	4–1	Montreal Canadiens (1942–43)	3–4–0
8	W	November 22, 1942	7–6	Toronto Maple Leafs (1942–43)	4–4–0
9	T	November 24, 1942	5–5	Chicago Black Hawks (1942–43)	4–4–1
10	W	November 28, 1942	6–2	@ Montreal Canadiens (1942–43)	5–4–1
11	L	November 29, 1942	2–3	@ New York Rangers (1942–43)	5–5–1

December

Game	Result	Date	Score	Opponent	Record
12	W	December 1, 1942	5–2	Detroit Red Wings (1942–43)	6–5–1
13	W	December 6, 1942	5–4	New York Rangers (1942–43)	7–5–1
14	W	December 8, 1942	9–6	Chicago Black Hawks (1942–43)	8–5–1
15	W	December 12, 1942	3–2	Montreal Canadiens (1942–43)	9–5–1
16	T	December 13, 1942	1–1	@ Detroit Red Wings (1942–43)	9–5–2
17	W	December 15, 1942	3–2	Detroit Red Wings (1942–43)	10–5–2
18	W	December 17, 1942	7–3	@ New York Rangers (1942–43)	11–5–2
19	T	December 19, 1942	3–3	@ Toronto Maple Leafs (1942–43)	11–5–3
20	T	December 20, 1942	4–4	@ Chicago Black Hawks (1942–43)	11–5–4
21	T	December 22, 1942	4–4	Toronto Maple Leafs (1942–43)	11–5–5
22	L	December 26, 1942	2–7	@ Toronto Maple Leafs (1942–43)	11–6–5
23	L	December 27, 1942	2–4	@ Montreal Canadiens (1942–43)	11–7–5
24	L	December 29, 1942	3–5	New York Rangers (1942–43)	11–8–5

January

Game	Result	Date	Score	Opponent	Record
25	T	January 1, 1943	2–2	Detroit Red Wings (1942–43)	11–8–6
26	W	January 3, 1943	3–2	@ Detroit Red Wings (1942–43)	12–8–6
27	L	January 9, 1943	2–7	@ Montreal Canadiens (1942–43)	12–9–6
28	W	January 10, 1943	5–4	Toronto Maple Leafs (1942–43)	13–9–6
29	W	January 12, 1943	3–0	Chicago Black Hawks (1942–43)	14–9–6
30	W	January 16, 1943	7–5	New York Rangers (1942–43)	15–9–6
31	W	January 17, 1943	6–3	@ New York Rangers (1942–43)	16–9–6
32	W	January 19, 1943	5–2	Montreal Canadiens (1942–43)	17–9–6
33	L	January 21, 1943	2–3	@ Detroit Red Wings (1942–43)	17–10–6
34	L	January 24, 1943	3–4	@ Chicago Black Hawks (1942–43)	17–11–6
35	L	January 26, 1943	3–5	Detroit Red Wings (1942–43)	17–12–6
36	W	January 30, 1943	5–3	@ Toronto Maple Leafs (1942–43)	18–12–6
37	W	January 31, 1943	7–2	@ New York Rangers (1942–43)	19–12–6

February

Game	Result	Date	Score	Opponent	Record
38	W	February 2, 1943	5–3	Chicago Black Hawks (1942–43)	20–12–6
39	L	February 6, 1943	3–8	@ Montreal Canadiens (1942–43)	20–13–6
40	W	February 7, 1943	7–1	Montreal Canadiens (1942–43)	21–13–6
41	W	February 9, 1943	3–1	Toronto Maple Leafs (1942–43)	22–13–6
42	L	February 14, 1943	2–3	@ Chicago Black Hawks (1942–43)	22–14–6
43	L	February 20, 1943	2–4	@ Toronto Maple Leafs (1942–43)	22–15–6
44	L	February 21, 1943	0–4	@ Detroit Red Wings (1942–43)	22–16–6
45	L	February 23, 1943	5–7	Chicago Black Hawks (1942–43)	22–17–6
46	T	February 28, 1943	4–4	@ Chicago Black Hawks (1942–43)	22–17–7

March

Game	Result	Date	Score	Opponent	Record
47	W	March 2, 1943	3–1	Detroit Red Wings (1942–43)	23–17–7
48	T	March 9, 1943	5–5	Toronto Maple Leafs (1942–43)	23–17–8
49	T	March 14, 1943	4–4	Montreal Canadiens (1942–43)	23–17–9
50	W	March 16, 1943	11–5	New York Rangers (1942–43)	24–17–9

Legend: Win (2 points) Loss (0 points) Tie (1 point)

== Playoffs ==
The Boston Bruins defeated the Montreal Canadiens in the semi-finals 4–1, but were swept in four games by the Detroit Red Wings in the 1943 Stanley Cup Finals.

== Player statistics ==
=== Regular season ===
Scoring

Player	Pos	GP	G	A	Pts	PIM
Bill Cowley	C	48	27	45	72	10
Art Jackson	C	50	22	31	53	20
Buzz Boll	LW	43	25	27	52	20
Flash Hollett	D	50	19	25	44	19
Herb Cain	LW	45	18	18	36	19
Busher Jackson	LW	44	19	15	34	38
Don Gallinger	C	48	14	20	34	16
Murph Chamberlain	LW	45	9	24	33	67
Dit Clapper	RW/D	38	5	18	23	12
Jack Crawford	D	49	5	18	23	24
Bep Guidolin	LW	42	7	15	22	43
Jack Schmidt	LW	45	6	7	13	6
Irwin Boyd	RW	20	6	5	11	6
Jack Shewchuk	D	48	2	6	8	50
Ab DeMarco	C	3	4	1	5	0
Bill Shill	RW	7	4	1	5	4
Oscar Aubuchon	LW	3	3	0	3	0
Norm Calladine	C	3	0	1	1	0
Frank Brimsek	G	50	0	0	0	0
Dutch Hiller	LW	3	0	0	0	0

Goaltending

Player	MIN	GP	W	L	T	GA	GAA	SO
Frank Brimsek	3000	50	24	17	9	176	3.52	1
Team:	3000	50	24	17	9	176	3.52	1

=== Playoffs ===
Scoring

Player	Pos	GP	G	A	Pts	PIM
Art Jackson	C	9	6	3	9	7
Flash Hollett	D	9	0	9	9	4
Bill Cowley	C	9	1	7	8	4
Herb Cain	LW	7	4	2	6	0
Dit Clapper	RW/D	9	2	3	5	9
Don Gallinger	C	9	3	1	4	10
Bep Guidolin	LW	9	0	4	4	12
Ab DeMarco	C	9	3	0	3	2
Busher Jackson	LW	9	1	2	3	10
Murph Chamberlain	LW	6	1	1	2	12
Jack Crawford	D	6	1	1	2	10
Oscar Aubuchon	LW	6	1	0	1	0
Irwin Boyd	RW	5	0	1	1	4
Bill Anderson	D	1	0	0	0	0
Frank Brimsek	G	9	0	0	0	0
Jack Schmidt	LW	5	0	0	0	0
Jack Shewchuk	D	9	0	0	0	12

Goaltending

Player	MIN	GP	W	L	GA	GAA	SO
Frank Brimsek	560	9	4	5	33	3.54	0
Team:	560	9	4	5	33	3.54	0

Note:

Pos = Position;GP = Games played; G = Goals; A = Assists; Pts = Points; PIM = Penalty minutes; +/- = Plus/minus; PPG = Power-play goals; SHG = Short-handed goals; GWG = Game-winning goals
Pos = Position;GP = Games played; Min, TOI = Minutes played; W = Wins; L = Losses; T,T/OT = Ties; OTL = Overtime losses; GA = Goals-against; GAA = Goals-against average; SO = Shutouts; SA = Shots against; SV = Shots saved;SV% = Save percentage;

== See also ==
- 1942–43 NHL season
