= 1943–44 NHL transactions =

The following is a list of all team-to-team transactions that have occurred in the National Hockey League (NHL) during the 1943–44 NHL season. It lists which team each player has been traded to and for which player(s) or other consideration(s), if applicable.

== Transactions ==
September 10, 1943	To Toronto Maple Leafs Ted Kennedy	To Montreal Canadiens rights to Frank Eddolls
October 30, 1943	To Boston Bruins Bert Gardiner	To Montreal Canadiens cash
November, 1943; Exact date unknown	To Toronto Maple Leafs cash	To New York Rangers Bucko McDonald
November, 1943; Exact date unknown	To Boston Bruins cash	To New York Rangers Ab DeMarco
November, 1943; Exact date unknown	To Boston Bruins cash	To New York Rangers rights to Chuck Scherza
November, 1943; Exact date unknown	To Boston Bruins cash	To New York Rangers rights to Oscar Aubuchon
January 5, 1944	To Boston Bruins Pat Egan	To Detroit Red Wings Flash Hollett
January 12, 1944	To Montreal Canadiens Nestor Lubeck; Hubert Macey; Spence Tatchell	To New York Rangers Kilby MacDonald
February 22, 1944	To Boston Bruins $3,000 cash	To New York Rangers Aldo Palazzari
