= 1942–43 New York Rangers season =

NHL hockey team season

1942–43 New York Rangers
- League: 6th NHL
- 1942–43 record: 11–31–8
- Home record: 7–13–5
- Road record: 4–18–3
- Goals for: 161
- Goals against: 253

Team information
- General manager: Lester Patrick
- Coach: Frank Boucher
- Captain: Ott Heller
- Arena: Madison Square Garden

Team leaders
- Goals: Bryan Hextall (27)
- Assists: Lynn Patrick (39)
- Points: Lynn Patrick (61)
- Penalty minutes: Vic Myles (57)
- Wins: Jimmy Franks (5)
- Goals against average: Jimmy Franks (4.48)

The 1942–43 New York Rangers season was the franchise's 17th season. During the regular season, the Rangers posted an 11–31–8 record and finished with 30 points. The Rangers finished in last place in the NHL and did not qualify for the playoffs for the first time since the 1935–36 season.

== Regular season ==
=== Final standings ===
National Hockey League
		GP	W	L	T	GF	GA	DIFF	Pts
1	Detroit Red Wings	50	25	14	11	169	124	+45	61
2	Boston Bruins	50	24	17	9	195	176	+19	57
3	Toronto Maple Leafs	50	22	19	9	198	159	+39	53
4	Montreal Canadiens	50	19	19	12	181	191	−10	50
5	Chicago Black Hawks	50	17	18	15	179	180	−1	49
6	New York Rangers	50	11	31	8	161	253	−92	30

=== Record vs. opponents ===
1942–43 NHL Records
Team	BOS	CHI	DET	MTL	NYR	TOR
Boston	—	3–4–3	4–4–2	5–4–1	8–2	4–3–3
Chicago	4–3–3	—	2–4–4	1–4–5	4–4–2	6–3–1
Detroit	4–4–2	4–2–4	—	5–3–2	7–1–2	5–4–1
Montreal	4–5–1	4–1–5	3–5–2	—	6–2–2	2–6–2
New York	2–8	4–4–2	1–7–2	2–6–2	—	2–6–2
Toronto	3–4–3	3–6–1	4–5–1	6–2–2	6–2–2	—

== Schedule and results ==
1942–43 regular season
October: 0–1–0 (home: 0-0-0; road: 0–1–0)

Game	October	Opponent	Score	Record
1	31	@ Toronto Maple Leafs	7–2	0–1–0

November: 4–6–1 (home: 3–2–1; road: 1–4–0)

Game	November	Opponent	Score	Record
2	5	@ Detroit Red Wings	12–5	0–2–0
3	7	Montreal Canadiens	4 – 3 OT	1–2–0
4	8	@ Montreal Canadiens	10–4	1–3–0
5	10	Chicago Black Hawks	5 – 3 OT	2–3–0
6	14	@ Boston Bruins	5–3	2–4–0
7	15	Boston Bruins	4–3	2–5–0
8	19	Toronto Maple Leafs	7–3	2–6–0
9	22	Detroit Red Wings	4–4	2–6–1
10	26	@ Chicago Black Hawks	2–1	3–6–1
11	28	@ Toronto Maple Leafs	8–6	3–7–1
12	29	Boston Bruins	3–2	4–7–1

December: 3–6–1 (home: 1–4–0; road: 2–2–1)

Game	December	Opponent	Score	Record
13	3	@ Chicago Black Hawks	3–1	4–8–1
14	6	@ Boston Bruins	5–4	4–9–1
15	13	Montreal Canadiens	7–3	4–10–1
16	17	Boston Bruins	7–3	4–11–1
17	19	@ Montreal Canadiens	1–1	4–11–2
18	20	Toronto Maple Leafs	8–2	4–12–2
19	25	@ Detroit Red Wings	3–1	5–12–2
20	27	Toronto Maple Leafs	3–1	6–12–2
21	29	@ Boston Bruins	5–3	7–12–2
22	31	Detroit Red Wings	2–0	7–13–2

January: 0–9–3 (home: 0–4–1; road: 0–5–2)

Game	January	Opponent	Score	Record
23	1	@ Chicago Black Hawks	6–5	7–14–2
24	3	Chicago Black Hawks	3–3	7–14–3
25	7	@ Detroit Red Wings	2–2	7–14–4
26	10	Montreal Canadiens	7–4	7–15–4
27	14	Detroit Red Wings	4–1	7–16–4
28	16	@ Boston Bruins	7–5	7–17–4
29	17	Boston Bruins	6–3	7–18–4
30	21	@ Toronto Maple Leafs	7–4	7–19–4
31	23	@ Montreal Canadiens	5–5	7–19–5
32	24	@ Detroit Red Wings	7–0	7–20–5
33	28	@ Chicago Black Hawks	10–1	7–21–5
34	31	Boston Bruins	7–2	7–22–5

February: 2–6–2 (home: 2–2–2; road: 0–4–0)

Game	February	Opponent	Score	Record
35	4	Chicago Black Hawks	1–1	7–22–6
36	6	@ Toronto Maple Leafs	3–2	7–23–6
37	7	@ Chicago Black Hawks	8–4	7–24–6
38	14	Toronto Maple Leafs	4–4	7–24–7
39	18	Detroit Red Wings	5–4	7–25–7
40	20	@ Montreal Canadiens	6–1	7–26–7
41	21	Montreal Canadiens	6–1	8–26–7
42	25	Chicago Black Hawks	7–4	9–26–7
43	27	@ Detroit Red Wings	7–1	9–27–7
44	28	Detroit Red Wings	5–1	9–28–7

March: 2–3–1 (home: 1–1–1; road: 1–2–0)

Game	March	Opponent	Score	Record
45	2	@ Toronto Maple Leafs	4–0	10–28–7
46	4	Montreal Canadiens	7–2	10–29–7
47	7	Toronto Maple Leafs	5–5	10–29–8
48	14	Chicago Black Hawks	7–5	11–29–8
49	16	@ Boston Bruins	11–5	11–30–8
50	18	@ Montreal Canadiens	6–3	11–31–8

Legend: Win (2 points) Loss (0 points) Tie (1 point)

== Player statistics ==
Skaters

Regular season
Player	GP	G	A	Pts	PIM
Lynn Patrick	50	22	39	61	28
Bryan Hextall	50	27	32	59	28
Phil Watson	46	14	28	42	44
Grant Warwick	50	17	18	35	31
Clint Smith	47	12	21	33	4
Hank Goldup^{†}	36	11	20	31	33
Bob Kirkpatrick	49	12	12	24	6
Alf Pike	41	6	16	22	48
Scotty Cameron	35	8	11	19	0
Ehrhardt Heller	45	4	14	18	14
Vic Myles	45	6	9	15	57
Gus Mancuso	21	6	8	14	13
Joe Shack	20	5	9	14	6
Joe Bell	15	2	5	7	6
Hubert Macey	9	3	3	6	0
Gordon Davidson	35	2	3	5	4
Linthwaite Bend	8	3	1	4	2
Billy Gooden	12	0	3	3	0
Dudley Garrett	23	1	1	2	18
Walter Pratt^{†}	4	0	2	2	6
Bill Warwick	1	0	1	1	4
Spence Tatchell	1	0	0	0	0
Vic Lynn	1	0	0	0	0

Goaltenders

Regular season
Player	GP	TOI	W	L	T	GA	GAA	SO
Jimmy Franks	23	1380	5	14	4	103	4.48	0
Bill Beveridge	17	1020	4	10	3	89	5.24	1
Steve Buzinski	9	560	2	6	1	55	5.89	0
Lionel Bouvrette	1	60	0	1	0	6	6.00	0

^{†}Denotes player spent time with another team before joining Rangers. Stats reflect time with Rangers only.
^{‡}Traded mid-season. Stats reflect time with Rangers only.

Note:

Pos = Position;GP = Games played; G = Goals; A = Assists; Pts = Points; PIM = Penalty minutes; +/- = Plus/minus; PPG = Power-play goals; SHG = Short-handed goals; GWG = Game-winning goals
Pos = Position;GP = Games played; Min, TOI = Minutes played; W = Wins; L = Losses; T,T/OT = Ties; OTL = Overtime losses; GA = Goals-against; GAA = Goals-against average; SO = Shutouts; SA = Shots against; SV = Shots saved;SV% = Save percentage;

== See also ==
- 1942–43 NHL season
