= List of New York Rangers seasons =

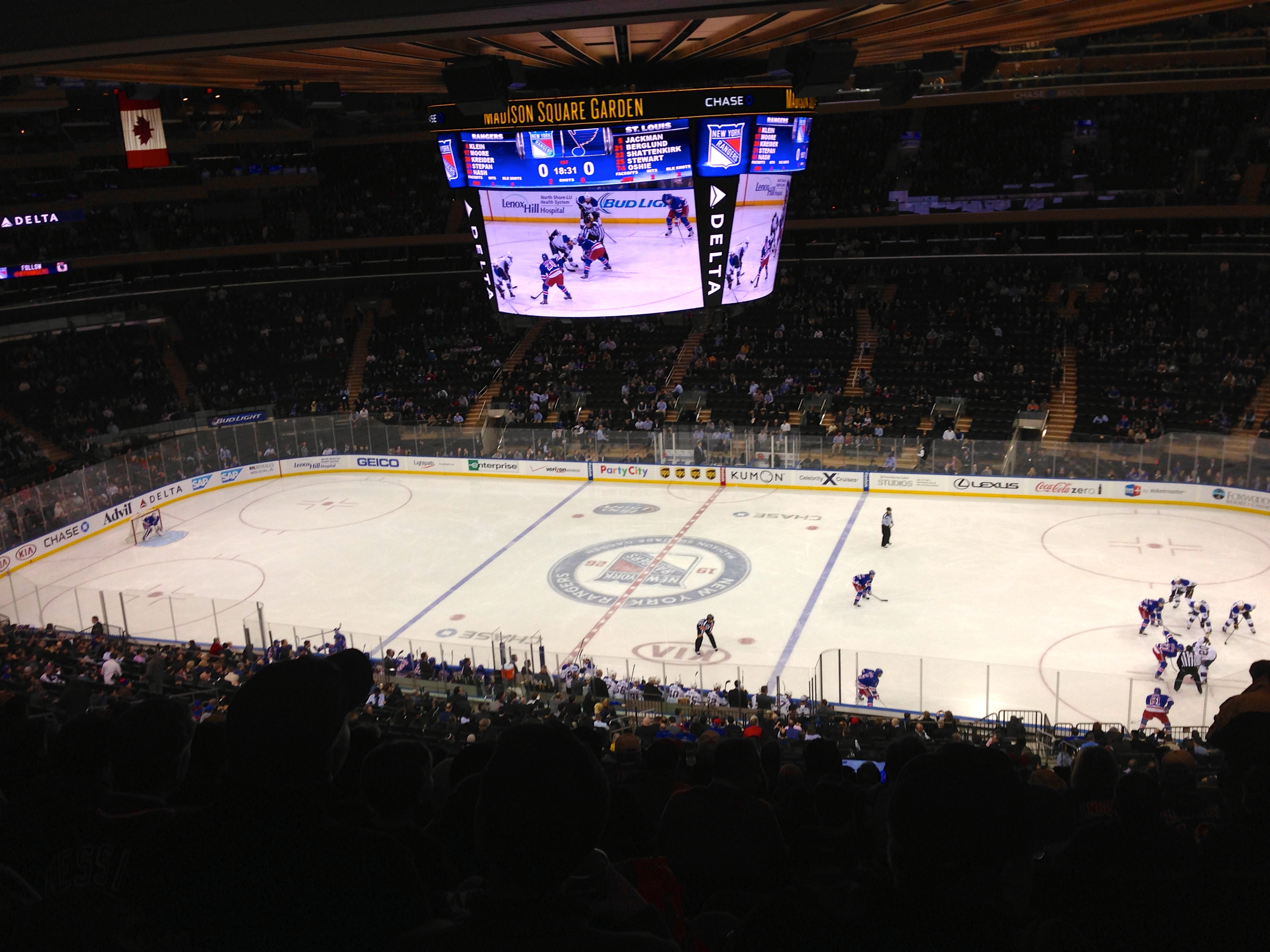
Madison Square Garden is the home arena of the Rangers.

The New York Rangers are a professional ice hockey team based in New York City. The team is a member of the Metropolitan Division in the Eastern Conference of the National Hockey League (NHL). The team is one of the NHL's "Original Six" teams, and since 1968, has played its home games in Madison Square Garden. In 98 completed seasons (excluding the lockout-canceled 2004–05 season), the team has won four Stanley Cup titles and has qualified for the playoffs 62 times. As of the end of the 2025–26 season, New York has won 3,110 regular season games, the fifth-highest victory total among NHL teams.

The Rangers were founded in 1926, and won their first Stanley Cup title in 1928, making them the first U.S.-based NHL franchise to win the Cup. Over the next 12 seasons, New York reached the Stanley Cup Final five times and won twice, in 1933 and 1940. The Rangers then entered a period of decline; from 1943 to 1966, New York missed the playoffs 18 times. During that time, the Rangers reached the 1950 Stanley Cup Final, where they lost to the Detroit Red Wings. In the 1970s, the Rangers made the Stanley Cup Final twice, but were defeated by the Boston Bruins in 1972 and by the Montreal Canadiens in 1979. Thirteen years later, in the 1991–92 season, New York won the Presidents' Trophy by leading the NHL in regular season points with 105. The team, however, was eliminated in the second round of the playoffs.

After missing the playoffs in the 1992–93 season, the Rangers accumulated 112 points in the 1993–94 season and won their second Presidents' Trophy. With a seven-game victory against the Vancouver Canucks in the 1994 Stanley Cup Final, the Rangers ended a 54-year Stanley Cup drought. After reaching the Eastern Conference finals in 1997, the Rangers did not return to the playoffs until 2006. In the 2013–14 season, the Rangers reached the Stanley Cup Final for the first time in 20 years, defeating the Canadiens in the Eastern Conference finals in six games before losing to the Los Angeles Kings in the Stanley Cup Final. New York earned its third Presidents' Trophy with a then-team record 113 points in 2014–15, but was eliminated in the conference finals in seven games by the Tampa Bay Lightning. In 2023–24, the Rangers won their fourth Presidents' Trophy with a team-record 114 points, but the Florida Panthers defeated them in the conference finals in six games.

== Table key ==
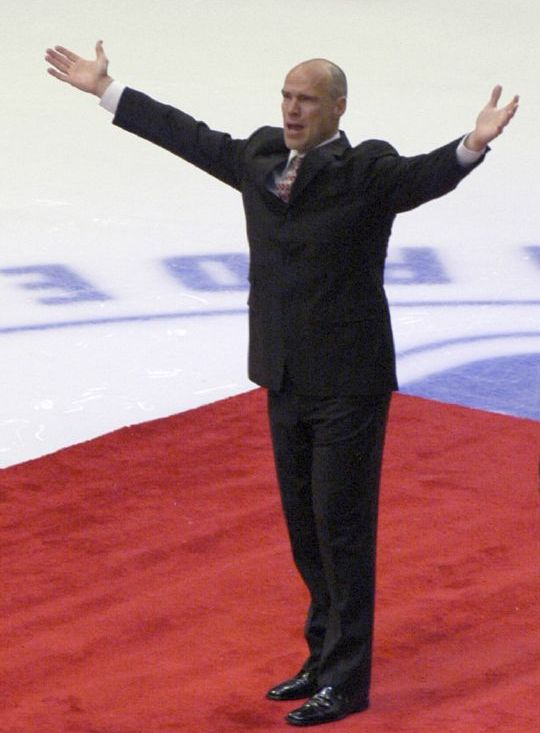
Mark Messier played 10 seasons for the Rangers and helped them win the Stanley Cup in 1994.

Key of colors and symbols
Color/symbol	Explanation
†	Stanley Cup champions
‡	Conference champions
↑	Division champions
#	Led league in points

Key of terms and abbreviations
Term or abbreviation	Definition
Finish	Final position in division or league standings
GP	Number of games played
W	Number of wins
L	Number of losses
T	Number of ties
OT	Number of losses in overtime (since the 1999–2000 season)
Pts	Number of points
GF	Goals for (goals scored by the Rangers)
GA	Goals against (goals scored by the Rangers' opponents)
—	Does not apply
TG	Two-game total goals series

== Year by year ==
As of April 15, 2026

Year by year listing of New York Rangers seasons
NHL season	Rangers season	Conference	Division	Regular season									Postseason						
NHL season	Rangers season	Conference	Division	Finish	GP	W	L	T	OT	Pts	GF	GA	GP	W	L	T	GF	GA	Result
1926–27	1926–27	—	American^{[a]}^{↑}	1st	44	25	13	6	—	56	95	72	2	0	1	1	1	3	Lost semifinals vs. Boston Bruins, 1–3 (TG)
1927–28†	1927–28	—	American	2nd	44	19	16	9	—	47	94	79	9	5	3	1	16	12	Won quarterfinals vs. Pittsburgh Pirates, 6–4 (TG); Won semifinals vs. Boston Bruins, 5–2 (TG); Won Stanley Cup Final vs. Montreal Maroons, 3–2†
1928–29	1928–29	—	American	2nd	44	21	13	10	—	52	72	65	6	3	2	1	5	5	Won quarterfinals vs. New York Americans, 1–0 (TG); Won semifinals vs. Toronto Maple Leafs, 2–0; Lost Stanley Cup Final vs. Boston Bruins, 0–2
1929–30	1929–30	—	American	3rd	44	17	17	10	—	44	136	143	4	1	2	1	7	7	Won quarterfinals vs. Ottawa Senators, 6–3 (TG); Lost semifinals vs. Montreal Canadiens, 0–2
1930–31	1930–31	—	American	3rd	44	19	16	9	—	47	106	87	4	2	2	0	8	4	Won quarterfinals vs. Montreal Maroons, 8–1 (TG); Lost semifinals vs. Chicago Black Hawks, 0–2
1931–32	1931–32	—	American^{↑}	1st	48	23	17	8	—	54	134	112	7	3	4	—	23	27	Won semifinals vs. Montreal Canadiens, 3–1; Lost Stanley Cup Final vs. Toronto Maple Leafs, 0–3
1932–33†	1932–33	—	American	3rd	48	23	17	8	—	54	135	107	8	6	1	1	25	13	Won quarterfinals vs. Montreal Canadiens, 8–5 (TG); Won semifinals vs. Detroit Red Wings, 6–3 (TG); Won Stanley Cup Final vs. Toronto Maple Leafs, 3–1†
1933–34	1933–34	—	American	3rd	48	21	19	8	—	50	120	113	2	0	1	1	1	2	Lost quarterfinals vs. Montreal Maroons, 1–2 (TG)
1934–35	1934–35	—	American	3rd	48	22	20	6	—	50	137	139	4	1	1	2	10	10	Won quarterfinals vs. Montreal Canadiens, 6–5 (TG); Lost semifinals vs. Montreal Maroons, 4–5 (TG)
1935–36	1935–36	—	American	4th	48	19	17	12	—	50	91	96	—	—	—	—	—	—	Did not qualify
1936–37	1936–37	—	American	3rd	48	19	20	9	—	47	117	106	9	6	3	—	18	10	Won quarterfinals vs. Toronto Maple Leafs, 2–0; Won semifinals vs. Montreal Maroons, 2–0; Lost Stanley Cup Final vs. Detroit Red Wings, 2–3
1937–38	1937–38	—	American	2nd	48	27	15	6	—	60	149	96	3	1	2	—	7	8	Lost quarterfinals vs. New York Americans, 1–2
1938–39	1938–39	—	—^{[b]}	2nd	48	26	16	6	—	58	149	105	7	3	4	—	12	14	Lost semifinals vs. Boston Bruins, 3–4
1939–40†	1939–40	—	—	2nd	48	27	11	10	—	64	136	77	12	8	4	—	29	20	Won semifinals vs. Boston Bruins, 4–2; Won Stanley Cup Final vs. Toronto Maple Leafs, 4–2†
1940–41	1940–41	—	—	4th	48	21	19	8	—	50	143	125	3	1	2	—	6	6	Lost quarterfinals vs. Detroit Red Wings, 1–2
1941–42	1941–42	—	—	1st	48	29	17	2	—	60^{#}	177	143	6	2	4	—	12	13	Lost semifinals vs. Toronto Maple Leafs, 2–4
1942–43	1942–43	—	—	6th	50	11	31	8	—	30	161	253	—	—	—	—	—	—	Did not qualify
1943–44	1943–44	—	—	6th	50	6	39	5	—	17	162	310	—	—	—	—	—	—	Did not qualify
1944–45	1944–45	—	—	6th	50	11	29	10	—	32	154	247	—	—	—	—	—	—	Did not qualify
1945–46	1945–46	—	—	6th	50	13	28	9	—	35	144	191	—	—	—	—	—	—	Did not qualify
1946–47	1946–47	—	—	5th	60	22	32	6	—	50	167	186	—	—	—	—	—	—	Did not qualify
1947–48	1947–48	—	—	4th	60	21	26	13	—	55	176	201	6	2	4	—	12	17	Lost semifinals vs. Detroit Red Wings, 2–4
1948–49	1948–49	—	—	6th	60	18	31	11	—	47	133	172	—	—	—	—	—	—	Did not qualify
1949–50	1949–50	—	—	4th	70	28	31	11	—	67	170	189	12	7	5	—	32	29	Won semifinals vs. Montreal Canadiens, 4–1; Lost Stanley Cup Final vs. Detroit Red Wings, 3–4
1950–51	1950–51	—	—	5th	70	20	29	21	—	61	169	201	—	—	—	—	—	—	Did not qualify
1951–52	1951–52	—	—	5th	70	23	34	13	—	59	192	219	—	—	—	—	—	—	Did not qualify
1952–53	1952–53	—	—	6th	70	17	37	16	—	50	152	211	—	—	—	—	—	—	Did not qualify
1953–54	1953–54	—	—	5th	70	29	31	10	—	68	161	182	—	—	—	—	—	—	Did not qualify
1954–55	1954–55	—	—	5th	70	17	35	18	—	52	150	210	—	—	—	—	—	—	Did not qualify
1955–56	1955–56	—	—	3rd	70	32	28	10	—	74	204	203	5	1	4	—	9	24	Lost semifinals vs. Montreal Canadiens, 1–4
1956–57	1956–57	—	—	4th	70	26	30	14	—	66	184	227	5	1	4	—	12	22	Lost semifinals vs. Montreal Canadiens, 1–4
1957–58	1957–58	—	—	2nd	70	32	25	13	—	77	195	188	6	2	4	—	16	28	Lost semifinals vs. Boston Bruins, 2–4
1958–59	1958–59	—	—	5th	70	26	32	12	—	64	201	217	—	—	—	—	—	—	Did not qualify
1959–60	1959–60	—	—	6th	70	17	38	15	—	49	187	247	—	—	—	—	—	—	Did not qualify
1960–61	1960–61	—	—	5th	70	22	38	10	—	54	204	248	—	—	—	—	—	—	Did not qualify
1961–62	1961–62	—	—	4th	70	26	32	12	—	64	195	207	6	2	4	—	15	22	Lost semifinals vs. Toronto Maple Leafs, 2–4
1962–63	1962–63	—	—	5th	70	22	36	12	—	56	211	233	—	—	—	—	—	—	Did not qualify
1963–64	1963–64	—	—	5th	70	22	38	10	—	54	186	242	—	—	—	—	—	—	Did not qualify
1964–65	1964–65	—	—	5th	70	20	38	12	—	52	179	246	—	—	—	—	—	—	Did not qualify
1965–66	1965–66	—	—	6th	70	18	41	11	—	47	195	261	—	—	—	—	—	—	Did not qualify
1966–67	1966–67	—	—	4th	70	30	28	12	—	72	188	189	4	0	4	—	8	14	Lost semifinals vs. Montreal Canadiens, 0–4
1967–68	1967–68	—	East^{[c]}	2nd	74	39	23	12	—	90	226	183	6	2	4	—	12	18	Lost quarterfinals vs. Chicago Black Hawks, 2–4
1968–69	1968–69	—	East	3rd	76	41	26	9	—	91	231	196	4	0	4	—	7	16	Lost quarterfinals vs. Montreal Canadiens, 0–4
1969–70	1969–70	—	East	4th	76	38	22	16	—	92	246	189	6	2	4	—	16	25	Lost quarterfinals vs. Boston Bruins, 2–4
1970–71	1970–71	—	East	2nd	78	49	18	11	—	109	259	177	13	7	6	—	30	36	Won quarterfinals vs. Toronto Maple Leafs, 4–2; Lost semifinals vs. Chicago Black Hawks, 3–4
1971–72	1971–72	—	East	2nd	78	48	17	13	—	109	317	192	16	10	6	—	52	41	Won quarterfinals vs. Montreal Canadiens, 4–2; Won semifinals vs. Chicago Black Hawks, 4–0; Lost Stanley Cup Final vs. Boston Bruins, 2–4
1972–73	1972–73	—	East	3rd	78	47	23	8	—	102	297	208	10	5	5	—	33	26	Won quarterfinals vs. Boston Bruins, 4–1; Lost semifinals vs. Chicago Black Hawks, 1–4
1973–74	1973–74	—	East	3rd	78	40	24	14	—	94	300	251	13	7	6	—	38	39	Won quarterfinals vs. Montreal Canadiens, 4–2; Lost semifinals vs. Philadelphia Flyers, 3–4
1974–75	1974–75	Campbell^{[d]}	Patrick	2nd	80	37	29	14	—	88	319	276	3	1	2	—	13	10	Lost preliminary round vs. New York Islanders, 1–2
1975–76	1975–76	Campbell	Patrick	4th	80	29	42	9	—	67	262	333	—	—	—	—	—	—	Did not qualify
1976–77	1976–77	Campbell	Patrick	4th	80	29	37	14	—	72	272	310	—	—	—	—	—	—	Did not qualify
1977–78	1977–78	Campbell	Patrick	4th	80	30	37	13	—	73	279	280	3	1	2	—	6	11	Lost preliminary round vs. Buffalo Sabres, 1–2
1978–79	1978–79	Campbell	Patrick	3rd	80	40	29	11	—	91	316	292	18	11	7	—	66	42	Won preliminary round vs. Los Angeles Kings, 2–0; Won quarterfinals vs. Philadelphia Flyers, 4–1; Won semifinals vs. New York Islanders, 4–2; Lost Stanley Cup Final vs. Montreal Canadiens, 1–4
1979–80	1979–80	Campbell	Patrick	3rd	80	38	32	10	—	86	308	284	9	4	5	—	21	23	Won preliminary round vs. Atlanta Flames, 3–1; Lost quarterfinals vs. Philadelphia Flyers, 1–4
1980–81	1980–81	Campbell	Patrick	4th	80	30	36	14	—	74	312	317	14	7	7	—	60	56	Won preliminary round vs. Los Angeles Kings, 3–1; Won quarterfinals vs. St. Louis Blues, 4–2; Lost semifinals vs. New York Islanders, 0–4
1981–82	1981–82	Wales^{[e]}	Patrick	2nd	80	39	27	14	—	92	316	306	10	5	5	—	39	42	Won division semifinals vs. Philadelphia Flyers, 3–1; Lost division finals vs. New York Islanders, 2–4
1982–83	1982–83	Wales	Patrick	4th	80	35	35	10	—	80	306	287	9	5	4	—	33	37	Won division semifinals vs. Philadelphia Flyers, 3–0; Lost division finals vs. New York Islanders, 2–4
1983–84	1983–84	Wales	Patrick	4th	80	42	29	9	—	93	314	304	5	2	3	—	14	13	Lost division semifinals vs. New York Islanders, 2–3
1984–85	1984–85	Wales	Patrick	4th	80	26	44	10	—	62	295	345	3	0	3	—	10	14	Lost division semifinals vs. Philadelphia Flyers, 0–3
1985–86	1985–86	Wales	Patrick	4th	80	36	38	6	—	78	280	276	16	8	8	—	47	55	Won division semifinals vs. Philadelphia Flyers, 3–2; Won division finals vs. Washington Capitals, 4–2; Lost conference finals vs. Montreal Canadiens, 1–4
1986–87	1986–87	Wales	Patrick	4th	80	34	38	8	—	76	307	323	6	2	4	—	13	22	Lost division semifinals vs. Philadelphia Flyers, 2–4
1987–88	1987–88	Wales	Patrick	5th	80	36	34	10	—	82	300	283	—	—	—	—	—	—	Did not qualify
1988–89	1988–89	Wales	Patrick	3rd	80	37	35	8	—	82	310	307	4	0	4	—	11	19	Lost division semifinals vs. Pittsburgh Penguins, 0–4
1989–90	1989–90	Wales	Patrick^{↑}	1st	80	36	31	13	—	85	279	267	10	5	5	—	37	35	Won division semifinals vs. New York Islanders, 4–1; Lost division finals vs. Washington Capitals, 1–4
1990–91	1990–91	Wales	Patrick	2nd	80	36	31	13	—	85	297	265	6	2	4	—	16	16	Lost division semifinals vs. Washington Capitals, 2–4
1991–92	1991–92	Wales	Patrick^{↑}	1st	80	50	25	5	—	105^{#}	321	246	13	6	7	—	47	49	Won division semifinals vs. New Jersey Devils, 4–3; Lost division finals vs. Pittsburgh Penguins, 2–4
1992–93	1992–93	Wales	Patrick	6th	84	34	39	11	—	79	304	308	—	—	—	—	—	—	Did not qualify
1993–94†	1993–94	Eastern^{[f]}^{‡}	Atlantic^{↑}	1st	84	52	24	8	—	112^{#}	299	231	23	16	7	—	83	52	Won conference quarterfinals vs. New York Islanders, 4–0; Won conference semifinals vs. Washington Capitals, 4–1; Won conference finals vs. New Jersey Devils, 4–3; Won Stanley Cup Final vs. Vancouver Canucks, 4–3†
1994–95^{[g]}	1994–95	Eastern	Atlantic	4th	48	22	23	3	—	47	139	134	10	4	6	—	35	37	Won conference quarterfinals vs. Quebec Nordiques, 4–2; Lost conference semifinals vs. Philadelphia Flyers, 0–4
1995–96	1995–96	Eastern	Atlantic	2nd	82	41	27	14	—	96	272	237	11	5	6	—	34	38	Won conference quarterfinals vs. Montreal Canadiens, 4–2; Lost conference semifinals vs. Pittsburgh Penguins, 1–4
1996–97	1996–97	Eastern	Atlantic	4th	82	38	34	10	—	86	258	231	15	9	6	—	36	35	Won conference quarterfinals vs. Florida Panthers, 4–1; Won conference semifinals vs. New Jersey Devils, 4–1; Lost conference finals vs. Philadelphia Flyers, 1–4
1997–98	1997–98	Eastern	Atlantic	5th	82	25	39	18	—	68	197	231	—	—	—	—	—	—	Did not qualify
1998–99	1998–99	Eastern	Atlantic	4th	82	33	38	11	—	77	217	227	—	—	—	—	—	—	Did not qualify
1999–2000	1999–2000	Eastern	Atlantic	4th	82	29	38	12	3^{[h]}	73	218	246	—	—	—	—	—	—	Did not qualify
2000–01	2000–01	Eastern	Atlantic	4th	82	33	43	5	1	72	250	290	—	—	—	—	—	—	Did not qualify
2001–02	2001–02	Eastern	Atlantic	4th	82	36	38	4	4	80	227	258	—	—	—	—	—	—	Did not qualify
2002–03	2002–03	Eastern	Atlantic	4th	82	32	36	10	4	78	210	231	—	—	—	—	—	—	Did not qualify
2003–04	2003–04	Eastern	Atlantic	4th	82	27	40	7	8	69	206	250	—	—	—	—	—	—	Did not qualify
2004–05^{[i]}	2004–05	Eastern	Atlantic	Season not played due to lockout															
2005–06	2005–06	Eastern	Atlantic	3rd	82	44	26	—^{[j]}	12	100	257	215	4	0	4	—	4	17	Lost conference quarterfinals vs. New Jersey Devils, 0–4
2006–07	2006–07	Eastern	Atlantic	3rd	82	42	30	—	10	94	242	216	10	6	4	—	30	23	Won conference quarterfinals vs. Atlanta Thrashers, 4–0; Lost conference semifinals vs. Buffalo Sabres, 2–4
2007–08	2007–08	Eastern	Atlantic	3rd	82	42	27	—	13	97	213	199	10	5	5	—	31	27	Won conference quarterfinals vs. New Jersey Devils, 4–1; Lost conference semifinals vs. Pittsburgh Penguins, 1–4
2008–09	2008–09	Eastern	Atlantic	4th	82	43	30	—	9	95	210	218	7	3	4	—	11	19	Lost conference quarterfinals vs. Washington Capitals, 3–4
2009–10	2009–10	Eastern	Atlantic	4th	82	38	33	—	11	87	222	218	—	—	—	—	—	—	Did not qualify
2010–11	2010–11	Eastern	Atlantic	3rd	82	44	33	—	5	93	233	198	5	1	4	—	8	13	Lost conference quarterfinals vs. Washington Capitals, 1–4
2011–12	2011–12	Eastern	Atlantic^{↑}	1st	82	51	24	—	7	109	226	187	20	10	10	—	43	41	Won conference quarterfinals vs. Ottawa Senators, 4–3; Won conference semifinals vs. Washington Capitals, 4–3; Lost conference finals vs. New Jersey Devils, 2–4
2012–13^{[k]}	2012–13	Eastern	Atlantic	2nd	48	26	18	—	4	56	130	112	12	5	7	—	26	28	Won conference quarterfinals vs. Washington Capitals, 4–3; Lost conference semifinals vs. Boston Bruins, 1–4
2013–14	2013–14	Eastern^{‡}	Metropolitan^{[l]}	2nd	82	45	31	—	6	96	218	193	25	13	12	—	64	60	Won first round vs. Philadelphia Flyers, 4–3; Won second round vs. Pittsburgh Penguins, 4–3; Won conference finals vs. Montreal Canadiens, 4–2; Lost Stanley Cup Final vs. Los Angeles Kings, 1–4^{‡}
2014–15	2014–15	Eastern	Metropolitan^{↑}	1st	82	53	22	—	7	113^{#}	252	192	19	11	8	—	45	41	Won first round vs. Pittsburgh Penguins, 4–1; Won second round vs. Washington Capitals, 4–3; Lost conference finals vs. Tampa Bay Lightning, 3–4
2015–16	2015–16	Eastern	Metropolitan	3rd	82	46	27	—	9	101	236	217	5	1	4	—	10	21	Lost first round vs. Pittsburgh Penguins, 1–4
2016–17	2016–17	Eastern	Metropolitan	4th	82	48	28	—	6	102	253	216	12	6	6	—	34	30	Won first round vs. Montreal Canadiens, 4–2; Lost second round vs. Ottawa Senators, 2–4
2017–18	2017–18	Eastern	Metropolitan	8th	82	34	39	—	9	77	231	268	—	—	—	—	—	—	Did not qualify
2018–19	2018–19	Eastern	Metropolitan	7th	82	32	36	—	14	78	227	272	—	—	—	—	—	—	Did not qualify
2019–20^{[m]}	2019–20	Eastern	Metropolitan	7th	70	37	28	—	5	79	234	222	3	0	3	—	4	11	Lost qualifying round vs. Carolina Hurricanes, 0–3
2020–21^{[n]}	2020–21	—	East	5th	56	27	23	—	6	60	177	157	—	—	—	—	—	—	Did not qualify
2021–22	2021–22	Eastern	Metropolitan	2nd	82	52	24	—	6	110	254	207	20	10	10	—	62	58	Won first round vs. Pittsburgh Penguins, 4–3; Won second round vs. Carolina Hurricanes, 4–3; Lost conference finals vs. Tampa Bay Lightning, 2–4
2022–23	2022–23	Eastern	Metropolitan	3rd	82	47	22	—	13	107	277	219	7	3	4	—	17	17	Lost first round vs. New Jersey Devils, 3–4
2023–24	2023–24	Eastern	Metropolitan^{↑}	1st	82	55	23	—	4	114^{#}	282	229	16	10	6	—	47	42	Won first round vs. Washington Capitals, 4–0; Won second round vs. Carolina Hurricanes, 4–2; Lost conference finals vs. Florida Panthers, 2–4
2024–25	2024–25	Eastern	Metropolitan	5th	82	39	36	—	7	85	256	255	—	—	—	—	—	—	Did not qualify
2025–26	2025–26	Eastern	Metropolitan	8th	82	34	39	—	9	77	238	250	—	—	—	—	—	—	Did not qualify
Totals					6,970	3,110	2,860	808	192	7,220	21,345	21,176	561	267	286	8	1,529	1,565	62 playoff appearances

== Notes ==
- ^{a} From the 1926–27 season to the 1937–38 season, the Rangers played in the American Division.
- ^{b} From the 1938–39 season to the 1966–67 season, the NHL had no divisions.
- ^{c} Before the 1967–68 season, the NHL split into East and West Divisions because of the addition of six expansion teams.
- ^{d} The NHL realigned before the 1974–75 season. The Rangers were placed in the Clarence Campbell Conference's Patrick Division.
- ^{e} Before the 1981–82 season, the NHL moved the Patrick Division to the Prince of Wales Conference.
- ^{f} The NHL realigned into Eastern and Western conferences prior to the 1993–94 season. New York was placed in the Atlantic Division of the Eastern Conference.
- ^{g} The season was shortened to 48 games because of the 1994–95 NHL lockout.
- ^{h} Beginning with the 1999–2000 season, teams received one point for losing a regular season game in overtime.
- ^{i} The season was cancelled because of the 2004–05 NHL lockout.
- ^{j} Before the 2005–06 season, the NHL instituted a penalty shootout for regular-season games that remained tied after a five-minute overtime period, which prevented ties.
- ^{k} The season was shortened to 48 games because of the 2012–13 NHL lockout.
- ^{l} The NHL realigned its divisions before the 2013–14 season. The Rangers were placed in the Metropolitan Division.
- ^{m} The Rangers' season was shortened to 70 games because of the COVID-19 pandemic. The Rangers qualified for the NHL's expanded 24-team postseason.
- ^{n} Due to the COVID-19 pandemic, the 2020–21 NHL season was shortened to 56 games.
