= 1942–43 Montreal Canadiens season =

NHL hockey team season

1942–43 Montreal Canadiens
- League: 4th NHL
- 1942–43 record: 19–19–12
- Home record: 14–4–7
- Road record: 5–15–5
- Goals for: 181
- Goals against: 191

Team information
- General manager: Tommy Gorman
- Coach: Dick Irvin
- Captain: Toe Blake
- Arena: Montreal Forum

Team leaders
- Goals: Joe Benoit (30)
- Assists: Buddy O'Connor (43)
- Points: Toe Blake (59)
- Penalty minutes: Leo Lamoureux (53)
- Wins: Paul Bibeault (19)
- Goals against average: Paul Bibeault (3.81)

The 1942–43 Montreal Canadiens season was the 34th season in franchise history. The team placed fourth in the regular season to qualify for the playoffs. The Canadiens lost in the semi-finals against the Boston Bruins 4 games to 2.

== Regular season ==
The Montreal Canadiens were still making progress, and coach Dick Irvin put together the first "Punch Line" of Elmer Lach, Toe Blake and Joe Benoit. Benoit became the first Canadien to hit the 30-goal plateau since Howie Morenz did it in 1929–30 (40 goals) scoring an even 30. Gordie Drillon also added some scoring power. Rookie Maurice Richard showed promise, but broke his leg. The Canadiens made the playoffs by one point and bowed out in the playoffs' first round. Alex Smart scored three goals in his National Hockey League debut.

=== Final standings ===
National Hockey League
		GP	W	L	T	GF	GA	DIFF	Pts
1	Detroit Red Wings	50	25	14	11	169	124	+45	61
2	Boston Bruins	50	24	17	9	195	176	+19	57
3	Toronto Maple Leafs	50	22	19	9	198	159	+39	53
4	Montreal Canadiens	50	19	19	12	181	191	−10	50
5	Chicago Black Hawks	50	17	18	15	179	180	−1	49
6	New York Rangers	50	11	31	8	161	253	−92	30

=== Record vs. opponents ===
1942–43 NHL Records
Team	BOS	CHI	DET	MTL	NYR	TOR
Boston	—	3–4–3	4–4–2	5–4–1	8–2	4–3–3
Chicago	4–3–3	—	2–4–4	1–4–5	4–4–2	6–3–1
Detroit	4–4–2	4–2–4	—	5–3–2	7–1–2	5–4–1
Montreal	4–5–1	4–1–5	3–5–2	—	6–2–2	2–6–2
New York	2–8	4–4–2	1–7–2	2–6–2	—	2–6–2
Toronto	3–4–3	3–6–1	4–5–1	6–2–2	6–2–2	—

== Schedule and results ==
1942–43 regular season
October

Game	Result	Date	Score	Opponent	Record
1	W	October 31, 1942	3–2	Boston Bruins (1942–43)	1–0–0

November

Game	Result	Date	Score	Opponent	Record
2	L	November 7, 1942	3–4 OT	@ New York Rangers (1942–43)	1–1–0
3	W	November 8, 1942	10–4	New York Rangers (1942–43)	2–1–0
4	W	November 12, 1942	5–2	Chicago Black Hawks (1942–43)	3–1–0
5	L	November 14, 1942	2–5	Detroit Red Wings (1942–43)	3–2–0
6	L	November 15, 1942	1–3	@ Detroit Red Wings (1942–43)	3–3–0
7	L	November 17, 1942	1–4	@ Boston Bruins (1942–43)	3–4–0
8	L	November 21, 1942	0–8	@ Toronto Maple Leafs (1942–43)	3–5–0
9	T	November 22, 1942	3–3	@ Chicago Black Hawks (1942–43)	3–5–1
10	T	November 24, 1942	4–4	Detroit Red Wings (1942–43)	3–5–2
11	L	November 28, 1942	2–6	Boston Bruins (1942–43)	3–6–2
12	L	November 29, 1942	3–7	@ Detroit Red Wings (1942–43)	3–7–2

December

Game	Result	Date	Score	Opponent	Record
13	W	December 3, 1942	4–2	Toronto Maple Leafs (1942–43)	4–7–2
14	L	December 5, 1942	1–9	@ Toronto Maple Leafs (1942–43)	4–8–2
15	L	December 6, 1942	2–5	@ Chicago Black Hawks (1942–43)	4–9–2
16	L	December 12, 1942	2–3	@ Boston Bruins (1942–43)	4–10–2
17	W	December 13, 1942	7–3	@ New York Rangers (1942–43)	5–10–2
18	L	December 17, 1942	1–8	Toronto Maple Leafs (1942–43)	5–11–2
19	T	December 19, 1942	1–1	New York Rangers (1942–43)	5–11–3
20	L	December 20, 1942	3–4	@ Detroit Red Wings (1942–43)	5–12–3
21	T	December 25, 1942	2–2	Chicago Black Hawks (1942–43)	5–12–4
22	W	December 27, 1942	4–2	Boston Bruins (1942–43)	6–12–4

January

Game	Result	Date	Score	Opponent	Record
23	L	January 2, 1943	3–6	@ Toronto Maple Leafs (1942–43)	6–13–4
24	T	January 3, 1943	4–4	Toronto Maple Leafs (1942–43)	6–13–5
25	W	January 9, 1943	7–2	Boston Bruins (1942–43)	7–13–5
26	W	January 10, 1943	7–4	@ New York Rangers (1942–43)	8–13–5
27	W	January 14, 1943	5–1	Chicago Black Hawks (1942–43)	9–13–5
28	L	January 16, 1943	4–8	@ Toronto Maple Leafs (1942–43)	9–14–5
29	W	January 17, 1943	2–0	Toronto Maple Leafs (1942–43)	10–14–5
30	L	January 19, 1943	2–5	@ Boston Bruins (1942–43)	10–15–5
31	T	January 21, 1943	4–4	@ Chicago Black Hawks (1942–43)	10–15–6
32	T	January 23, 1943	5–5	New York Rangers (1942–43)	10–15–7
33	T	January 30, 1943	3–3	Detroit Red Wings (1942–43)	10–15–8
34	W	January 31, 1943	4–3	@ Detroit Red Wings (1942–43)	11–15–8

February

Game	Result	Date	Score	Opponent	Record
35	W	February 6, 1943	8–3	Boston Bruins (1942–43)	12–15–8
36	L	February 7, 1943	1–7	@ Boston Bruins (1942–43)	12–16–8
37	W	February 11, 1943	5–3	Chicago Black Hawks (1942–43)	13–16–8
38	W	February 13, 1943	5–2	Detroit Red Wings (1942–43)	14–16–8
39	L	February 14, 1943	1–2	@ Detroit Red Wings (1942–43)	14–17–8
40	W	February 18, 1943	5–4	@ Chicago Black Hawks (1942–43)	15–17–8
41	W	February 20, 1943	6–1	New York Rangers (1942–43)	16–17–8
42	L	February 21, 1943	1–6	@ New York Rangers (1942–43)	16–18–8
43	W	February 25, 1943	4–2	Detroit Red Wings (1942–43)	17–18–8
44	L	February 28, 1943	2–4	Toronto Maple Leafs (1942–43)	17–19–8

March

Game	Result	Date	Score	Opponent	Record
45	W	March 4, 1943	7–2	@ New York Rangers (1942–43)	18–19–8
46	T	March 6, 1943	2–2	@ Toronto Maple Leafs (1942–43)	18–19–9
47	T	March 11, 1943	4–4	@ Chicago Black Hawks (1942–43)	18–19–10
48	T	March 13, 1943	6–6	Chicago Black Hawks (1942–43)	18–19–11
49	T	March 14, 1943	4–4	@ Boston Bruins (1942–43)	18–19–12
50	W	March 18, 1943	6–3	New York Rangers (1942–43)	19–19–12

Legend: Win (2 points) Loss (0 points) Tie (1 point)

== Player statistics ==
=== Regular season ===
==== Scoring ====
Player	Pos	GP	G	A	Pts	PIM
Toe Blake	LW	48	23	36	59	26
Elmer Lach	C	45	18	40	58	14
Buddy O'Connor	C	50	15	43	58	2
Joe Benoit	RW	49	30	27	57	23
Gordie Drillon	RW	49	28	22	50	14
Ray Getliffe	C/LW	50	18	28	46	26
Emile Bouchard	D	45	2	16	18	47
Leo Lamoureux	C/D	46	2	16	18	53
Jack Portland	D	49	3	14	17	52
Dutch Hiller	LW	39	8	6	14	4
Glen Harmon	D	27	5	9	14	25
Terry Reardon	C/RW	13	6	6	12	2
Charlie Sands	C/RW	31	3	9	12	0
Maurice Richard	RW	16	5	6	11	4
William Meronek	C	12	3	6	9	0
Alex Smart	LW	8	5	2	7	0
Tony Demers	RW	9	2	5	7	0
John Mahaffy	C	9	2	5	7	4
Marcel Dheere	LW	11	1	2	3	2
Red Goupille	D	6	2	0	2	8
Tony Graboski	LW/D	9	0	2	2	4
Paul Bibeault	G	50	0	0	0	0
Ernie Laforce	D	1	0	0	0	0
Bobby Lee	C	1	0	0	0	0
Frank Mailley	D	1	0	0	0	0
Irv McGibbon	RW	1	0	0	0	2
Charlie Phillips	D	17	0	0	0	6

==== Goaltending ====
Player	MIN	GP	W	L	T	GA	GAA	SO
Paul Bibeault	3010	50	19	19	12	191	3.81	1
Team:	3010	50	19	19	12	191	3.81	1

=== Playoffs ===
==== Scoring ====
Player	Pos	GP	G	A	Pts	PIM
Buddy O'Connor	C	5	4	5	9	0
Toe Blake	LW	5	4	3	7	0
Gordie Drillon	RW	5	4	2	6	0
Elmer Lach	C	5	2	4	6	6
Joe Benoit	RW	5	1	3	4	4
Jack Portland	D	5	1	2	3	2
Dutch Hiller	LW	5	1	0	1	4
Emile Bouchard	D	5	0	1	1	4
Ray Getliffe	C/LW	5	0	1	1	8
Glen Harmon	D	5	0	1	1	2
Paul Bibeault	G	5	0	0	0	0
Marcel Dheere	LW	5	0	0	0	6
Gerry Heffernan	RW	2	0	0	0	0
Mike McMahon	D	5	0	0	0	14
William Meronek	C	1	0	0	0	0
Charlie Sands	C/RW	2	0	0	0	0

==== Goaltending ====
Player	MIN	GP	W	L	GA	GAA	SO
Paul Bibeault	320	5	1	4	18	3.38	1
Team:	320	5	1	4	18	3.38	1

Note:

Pos = Position;GP = Games played; G = Goals; A = Assists; Pts = Points; PIM = Penalty minutes; +/- = Plus/minus; PPG = Power-play goals; SHG = Short-handed goals; GWG = Game-winning goals
Pos = Position;GP = Games played; Min, TOI = Minutes played; W = Wins; L = Losses; T,T/OT = Ties; OTL = Overtime losses; GA = Goals-against; GAA = Goals-against average; SO = Shutouts; SA = Shots against; SV = Shots saved;SV% = Save percentage;

== See also ==
- 1942–43 NHL season
