= Dallas Texans =

Dallas Texans may refer to:

== American football ==
- Dallas Texans (NFL), 1952 team in the National Football League
- Dallas Texans (AFL), 1960–1962 team that is now the Kansas City Chiefs
- Dallas Texans (arena football), 1990–1993 Arena Football League team

== Ice hockey ==
- Dallas Texans (ice hockey), 1941–1942 team in the American Hockey Association; 1945–1949 team in the United States Hockey League (1945–1951)
