= 1942–43 Detroit Red Wings season =

Sports season

1942–43 Detroit Red Wings
- Stanley Cup champions
- Prince of Wales Trophy winners
- League: 1st NHL
- 1942–43 record: 25–14–11
- Home record: 16–4–5
- Road record: 9–10–6
- Goals for: 169
- Goals against: 124

Team information
- General manager: Jack Adams
- Coach: Jack Adams
- Captain: Sid Abel
- Arena: Olympia Stadium

Team leaders
- Goals: Mud Bruneteau (23)
- Assists: Syd Howe (35)
- Points: Syd Howe (55)
- Penalty minutes: Jimmy Orlando (99)
- Wins: Johnny Mowers (25)
- Goals against average: Johnny Mowers (2.47)

The 1942–43 Detroit Red Wings season was the 17th season of the Detroit NHL franchise, eleventh as the 'Red Wings.' The highlight of the Red Wings season was winning the Stanley Cup.

== Regular season ==
=== Final standings ===
National Hockey League
| | | GP | W | L | T | GF | GA | DIFF | Pts |
|---|---|---|---|---|---|---|---|---|---|
| 1 | Detroit Red Wings | 50 | 25 | 14 | 11 | 169 | 124 | +45 | 61 |
| 2 | Boston Bruins | 50 | 24 | 17 | 9 | 195 | 176 | +19 | 57 |
| 3 | Toronto Maple Leafs | 50 | 22 | 19 | 9 | 198 | 159 | +39 | 53 |
| 4 | Montreal Canadiens | 50 | 19 | 19 | 12 | 181 | 191 | −10 | 50 |
| 5 | Chicago Black Hawks | 50 | 17 | 18 | 15 | 179 | 180 | −1 | 49 |
| 6 | New York Rangers | 50 | 11 | 31 | 8 | 161 | 253 | −92 | 30 |

=== Record vs. opponents ===
1942–43 NHL Records
| Team | BOS | CHI | DET | MTL | NYR | TOR |
|---|---|---|---|---|---|---|
| Boston | — | 3–4–3 | 4–4–2 | 5–4–1 | 8–2 | 4–3–3 |
| Chicago | 4–3–3 | — | 2–4–4 | 1–4–5 | 4–4–2 | 6–3–1 |
| Detroit | 4–4–2 | 4–2–4 | — | 5–3–2 | 7–1–2 | 5–4–1 |
| Montreal | 4–5–1 | 4–1–5 | 3–5–2 | — | 6–2–2 | 2–6–2 |
| New York | 2–8 | 4–4–2 | 1–7–2 | 2–6–2 | — | 2–6–2 |
| Toronto | 3–4–3 | 3–6–1 | 4–5–1 | 6–2–2 | 6–2–2 | — |

== Schedule and results ==
1942–43 regular season
November

| Game | Result | Date | Score | Opponent | Record |
|---|---|---|---|---|---|
| 1 | W | November 1, 1942 | 3–0 | Boston Bruins (1942–43) | 1–0–0 |
| 2 | W | November 5, 1942 | 12–5 | New York Rangers (1942–43) | 2–0–0 |
| 3 | L | November 7, 1942 | 2–5 | @ Toronto Maple Leafs (1942–43) | 2–1–0 |
| 4 | T | November 8, 1942 | 3–3 OT | Chicago Black Hawks (1942–43) | 2–1–1 |
| 5 | W | November 14, 1942 | 5–2 | @ Montreal Canadiens (1942–43) | 3–1–1 |
| 6 | W | November 15, 1942 | 3–1 | Montreal Canadiens (1942–43) | 4–1–1 |
| 7 | L | November 19, 1942 | 2–6 | @ Chicago Black Hawks (1942–43) | 4–2–1 |
| 8 | T | November 22, 1942 | 4–4 | @ New York Rangers (1942–43) | 4–2–2 |
| 9 | T | November 24, 1942 | 4–4 | @ Montreal Canadiens (1942–43) | 4–2–3 |
| 10 | W | November 26, 1942 | 2–1 | Toronto Maple Leafs (1942–43) | 5–2–3 |
| 11 | W | November 29, 1942 | 7–3 | Montreal Canadiens (1942–43) | 6–2–3 |

December

| Game | Result | Date | Score | Opponent | Record |
|---|---|---|---|---|---|
| 12 | L | December 1, 1942 | 2–5 | @ Boston Bruins (1942–43) | 6–3–3 |
| 13 | T | December 6, 1942 | 2–2 | Toronto Maple Leafs (1942–43) | 6–3–4 |
| 14 | L | December 12, 1942 | 4–5 | @ Toronto Maple Leafs (1942–43) | 6–4–4 |
| 15 | T | December 13, 1942 | 1–1 | Boston Bruins (1942–43) | 6–4–5 |
| 16 | L | December 15, 1942 | 2–3 | @ Boston Bruins (1942–43) | 6–5–5 |
| 17 | W | December 17, 1942 | 3–1 | @ Chicago Black Hawks (1942–43) | 7–5–5 |
| 18 | W | December 20, 1942 | 4–3 | Montreal Canadiens (1942–43) | 8–5–5 |
| 19 | L | December 25, 1942 | 1–3 | New York Rangers (1942–43) | 8–6–5 |
| 20 | W | December 27, 1942 | 6–1 | Chicago Black Hawks (1942–43) | 9–6–5 |
| 21 | W | December 31, 1942 | 2–0 | @ New York Rangers (1942–43) | 10–6–5 |

January

| Game | Result | Date | Score | Opponent | Record |
|---|---|---|---|---|---|
| 22 | T | January 1, 1943 | 2–2 | @ Boston Bruins (1942–43) | 10–6–6 |
| 23 | L | January 3, 1943 | 2–3 | Boston Bruins (1942–43) | 10–7–6 |
| 24 | T | January 7, 1943 | 2–2 | New York Rangers (1942–43) | 10–7–7 |
| 25 | W | January 9, 1943 | 4–0 | @ Toronto Maple Leafs (1942–43) | 11–7–7 |
| 26 | L | January 10, 1943 | 1–2 | @ Chicago Black Hawks (1942–43) | 11–8–7 |
| 27 | W | January 14, 1943 | 4–1 | @ New York Rangers (1942–43) | 12–8–7 |
| 28 | T | January 16, 1943 | 1–1 | Chicago Black Hawks (1942–43) | 12–8–8 |
| 29 | T | January 17, 1943 | 2–2 | @ Chicago Black Hawks (1942–43) | 12–8–9 |
| 30 | W | January 21, 1943 | 3–2 | Boston Bruins (1942–43) | 13–8–9 |
| 31 | W | January 24, 1943 | 7–0 | New York Rangers (1942–43) | 14–8–9 |
| 32 | W | January 26, 1943 | 5–3 | @ Boston Bruins (1942–43) | 15–8–9 |
| 33 | T | January 30, 1943 | 3–3 | @ Montreal Canadiens (1942–43) | 15–8–10 |
| 34 | L | January 31, 1943 | 3–4 | Montreal Canadiens (1942–43) | 15–9–10 |

February

| Game | Result | Date | Score | Opponent | Record |
|---|---|---|---|---|---|
| 35 | W | February 4, 1943 | 3–2 | @ Toronto Maple Leafs (1942–43) | 16–9–10 |
| 36 | W | February 7, 1943 | 5–3 | Toronto Maple Leafs (1942–43) | 17–9–10 |
| 37 | L | February 13, 1943 | 2–5 | @ Montreal Canadiens (1942–43) | 17–10–10 |
| 38 | W | February 14, 1943 | 2–1 | Montreal Canadiens (1942–43) | 18–10–10 |
| 39 | W | February 18, 1943 | 5–4 | @ New York Rangers (1942–43) | 19–10–10 |
| 40 | W | February 21, 1943 | 4–0 | Boston Bruins (1942–43) | 20–10–10 |
| 41 | L | February 25, 1943 | 2–4 | @ Montreal Canadiens (1942–43) | 20–11–10 |
| 42 | W | February 27, 1943 | 7–1 | New York Rangers (1942–43) | 21–11–10 |
| 43 | W | February 28, 1943 | 5–1 | @ New York Rangers (1942–43) | 22–11–10 |

March

| Game | Result | Date | Score | Opponent | Record |
|---|---|---|---|---|---|
| 44 | L | March 2, 1943 | 1–3 | @ Boston Bruins (1942–43) | 22–12–10 |
| 45 | W | March 6, 1943 | 5–0 | Chicago Black Hawks (1942–43) | 23–12–10 |
| 46 | T | March 7, 1943 | 3–3 | @ Chicago Black Hawks (1942–43) | 23–12–11 |
| 47 | W | March 11, 1943 | 2–1 | Toronto Maple Leafs (1942–43) | 24–12–11 |
| 48 | L | March 13, 1943 | 1–3 | @ Toronto Maple Leafs (1942–43) | 24–13–11 |
| 49 | L | March 14, 1943 | 3–5 | Toronto Maple Leafs (1942–43) | 24–14–11 |
| 50 | W | March 18, 1943 | 6–5 | Chicago Black Hawks (1942–43) | 25–14–11 |

Legend: Win (2 points) Loss (0 points) Tie (1 point)

== Player statistics ==
=== Regular season ===
Scoring

| Player | Pos | GP | G | A | Pts | PIM |
|---|---|---|---|---|---|---|
| Syd Howe | C/LW | 50 | 20 | 35 | 55 | 10 |
| Mud Bruneteau | RW | 50 | 23 | 22 | 45 | 2 |
| Carl Liscombe | LW | 50 | 19 | 23 | 42 | 19 |
| Sid Abel | C/LW | 49 | 18 | 24 | 42 | 33 |
| Joe Carveth | RW | 43 | 18 | 18 | 36 | 6 |
| Don Grosso | LW/C | 50 | 15 | 17 | 32 | 10 |
| Harry Watson | LW | 50 | 13 | 18 | 31 | 10 |
| Eddie Wares | D/RW | 47 | 12 | 18 | 30 | 10 |
| Connie Brown | C | 23 | 5 | 16 | 21 | 6 |
| Les Douglas | C | 21 | 5 | 8 | 13 | 4 |
| Jack Stewart | D | 44 | 2 | 9 | 11 | 68 |
| Alex Motter | C | 50 | 6 | 4 | 10 | 42 |
| Jimmy Orlando | D | 40 | 3 | 4 | 7 | 99 |
| Bill Jennings | RW | 8 | 3 | 3 | 6 | 2 |
| Ebbie Goodfellow | C/D | 11 | 1 | 4 | 5 | 4 |
| Harold Jackson | D | 4 | 0 | 4 | 4 | 6 |
| John Holota | C | 12 | 2 | 0 | 2 | 0 |
| Bill Quackenbush | D | 10 | 1 | 1 | 2 | 4 |
| Cully Simon | D | 34 | 1 | 1 | 2 | 34 |
| Dick Behling | D | 2 | 1 | 0 | 1 | 2 |
| Joe Fisher | RW | 1 | 1 | 0 | 1 | 0 |
| Jud McAtee | LW | 1 | 0 | 0 | 0 | 0 |
| Johnny Mowers | G | 50 | 0 | 0 | 0 | 0 |

Goaltending

| Player | MIN | GP | W | L | T | GA | GAA | SO |
|---|---|---|---|---|---|---|---|---|
| Johnny Mowers | 3010 | 50 | 25 | 14 | 11 | 124 | 2.47 | 6 |
| Team: | 3010 | 50 | 25 | 14 | 11 | 124 | 2.47 | 6 |

=== Playoffs ===
Scoring

| Player | Pos | GP | G | A | Pts | PIM |
|---|---|---|---|---|---|---|
| Carl Liscombe | LW | 10 | 6 | 8 | 14 | 2 |
| Sid Abel | C/LW | 10 | 5 | 8 | 13 | 4 |
| Mud Bruneteau | RW | 9 | 5 | 4 | 9 | 0 |
| Joe Carveth | RW | 10 | 6 | 2 | 8 | 4 |
| Don Grosso | LW/C | 10 | 4 | 2 | 6 | 10 |
| Eddie Wares | D/RW | 10 | 3 | 3 | 6 | 4 |
| Les Douglas | C | 10 | 3 | 2 | 5 | 2 |
| Syd Howe | C/LW | 7 | 1 | 2 | 3 | 0 |
| Jack Stewart | D | 10 | 1 | 2 | 3 | 35 |
| Jimmy Orlando | D | 10 | 0 | 3 | 3 | 14 |
| Adam Brown | LW | 6 | 1 | 1 | 2 | 2 |
| Cully Simon | D | 9 | 1 | 0 | 1 | 4 |
| Harold Jackson | D | 6 | 0 | 1 | 1 | 4 |
| Alex Motter | C | 5 | 0 | 1 | 1 | 2 |
| Joe Fisher | RW | 1 | 0 | 0 | 0 | 0 |
| Johnny Mowers | G | 10 | 0 | 0 | 0 | 0 |
| Harry Watson | LW | 7 | 0 | 0 | 0 | 0 |

Goaltending

| Player | MIN | GP | W | L | GA | GAA | SO |
|---|---|---|---|---|---|---|---|
| Johnny Mowers | 679 | 10 | 8 | 2 | 22 | 1.94 | 2 |
| Team: | 679 | 10 | 8 | 2 | 22 | 1.94 | 2 |

Note: GP = Games played; G = Goals; A = Assists; Pts = Points; +/- = Plus-minus PIM = Penalty minutes; PPG = Power-play goals; SHG = Short-handed goals; GWG = Game-winning goals;
MIN = Minutes played; W = Wins; L = Losses; T = Ties; GA = Goals against; GAA = Goals-against average; SO = Shutouts;

== Playoffs ==
Boston Bruins vs. Detroit Red Wings

| Date | Away | Score | Home | Score | Notes |
|---|---|---|---|---|---|
| April 1 | Boston | 2 | Detroit | 6 | |
| April 4 | Boston | 3 | Detroit | 4 | |
| April 7 | Detroit | 4 | Boston | 0 | |
| April 8 | Detroit | 2 | Boston | 0 | |

Detroit wins best-of-seven series 4–0.
