= Irwin Boyd =

American ice hockey player (1908–1979)

- Born: November 13, 1908 Ardmore, Pennsylvania, United States
- Died: November 12, 1979 (aged 70)
- Height: 5 ft 10 in (178 cm)
- Weight: 152 lb (69 kg; 10 st 12 lb)
- Position: Right wing
- Shot: Right
- Played for: Boston Bruins; Detroit Red Wings
- Playing career: 1929–1945

Irwin Scott "Yank" Boyd (November 13, 1908 — November 12, 1979) was an American professional ice hockey player who played 97 games in the National Hockey League for the Boston Bruins and Detroit Red Wings between 1931 and 1944. The rest of his career, which lasted from 1929 to 1944, was spent in various minor leagues. He moved to Canada at the age of 17 to play against other high-skilled players of his age.

== Career statistics ==
=== Regular season and playoffs ===
			Regular season					Playoffs
Season	Team	League	GP	G	A	Pts	PIM	GP	G	A	Pts	PIM
1925–26	Toronto Canoe Club	OHA Jr	7	5	1	6	—	—	—	—	—	—
1925–26	Toronto Canoe Club	OHA Sr	2	3	0	3	—	—	—	—	—	—
1926–27	Toronto Marlboros	OHA Sr	4	0	2	2	0	—	—	—	—	—
1927–28	Toronto CCM	TMHL	—	—	—	—	—	—	—	—	—	—
1928–29	Toronto CCM	TMHL	—	—	—	—	—	—	—	—	—	—
1929–30	Boston Tigers	Can-Am	40	24	12	36	90	5	2	2	4	8
1930–31	Boston Tigers	Can-Am	39	17	14	31	71	9	1	4	5	6
1931–32	Boston Bruins	NHL	29	2	1	3	10	—	—	—	—	—
1931–32	Boston Tigers	Can-Am	20	10	10	20	31	—	—	—	—	—
1932–33	Philadelphia Arrows	Can-Am	48	21	22	43	43	5	2	3	5	0
1933–34	Philadelphia Arrows	Can-Am	40	14	20	34	26	2	0	1	1	2
1934–35	Detroit Red Wings	NHL	42	2	3	5	14	—	—	—	—	—
1934–35	Detroit Olympics	IHL	9	4	6	10	6	—	—	—	—	—
1935–36	Windsor Bulldogs	IHL	18	5	4	9	14	—	—	—	—	—
1935–36	London Tecumsehs	IHL	24	14	10	24	22	2	3	0	3	0
1936–37	New Haven Eagles	IAHL	42	13	13	26	24	—	—	—	—	—
1937–38	New Haven Eagles	IAHL	38	3	9	12	6	2	1	1	2	0
1938–39	St. Paul Saints	AHA	45	14	40	54	31	3	1	0	1	2
1939–40	St. Paul Saints	AHA	46	26	22	48	27	7	5	3	8	2
1940–41	St. Paul Saints	AHA	30	8	8	16	9	4	0	0	0	0
1941–42	St. Paul Saints	AHA	47	6	20	26	18	2	0	0	0	0
1942–43	Boston Bruins	NHL	20	6	5	11	6	5	0	1	1	4
1943–44	Boston Bruins	NHL	5	0	1	1	0	—	—	—	—	—
1943–44	Providence Reds	AHL	38	6	27	33	12	—	—	—	—	—
1944–45	Providence Reds	AHL	1	0	1	1	0	—	—	—	—	—
Can-Am totals			187	86	78	164	261	21	5	10	15	16
NHL totals			96	10	10	20	30	5	0	1	1	4
