= Connie Dion =

Canadian ice hockey player

- Born: August 11, 1918 Saint-Rémi-de-Tingwick, Quebec, Canada
- Died: November 7, 2014 (aged 96) Asbestos, Quebec, Canada
- Height: 5 ft 4 in (163 cm)
- Weight: 140 lb (64 kg; 10 st 0 lb)
- Position: Goaltender
- Caught: Right
- Played for: Detroit Red Wings
- Playing career: 1937–1954

Joseph Conrad Étienne Dion (August 11, 1918 – November 7, 2014) was a Canadian professional ice hockey player who played two seasons in the National Hockey League (NHL) for the Detroit Red Wings between 1943 and 1945. One of thirteen children, Dion got his start as a goaltender with the Junior Verdun Maple Leafs in 1937 and had his first full season as a senior with the team the following year. After several seasons in the Quebec Senior and Professional Hockey Leagues, he was recruited by the Red Wings in 1943 as a potential replacement for Johnny Mowers, who had enlisted to fight in World War II. He spent two years with the team, earning a win-loss-tie record of 23–11–4 and taking part in the most lopsided shutout (15–0) in NHL history as the goalie for the winning side.

After being traded down to the American Hockey League (AHL) in 1945, Dion continued to play professional hockey for nearly a decade, primarily with the Buffalo Bisons and earned the Harry Hap Holmes Memorial Award in 1950 by being the goaltender with the lowest goals against average in the league. He retired from active competition in 1954 and moved to Asbestos, Quebec, where he was active in the local ice hockey and golf scenes. The arena in Asbestos, Aréna Connie Dion, is named in his honor.

== Early life ==
Dion was born on August 11, 1918, in Saint-Rémi-de-Tingwick, Quebec and had twelve siblings: six brothers and six sisters. He got his start as an ice hockey goaltender with the Junior Verdun Maple Leafs of the Quebec Junior Hockey League in 1937 and was selected as one of the goaltenders for the 1938 Memorial Cup All-Star team. He also played one game with the senior Maple Leafs that season. He served briefly in the Canadian Army in Cornwall, Ontario, and also worked as an asbestos miner for Johns Manville before quitting that job to play professional hockey.

== Hockey career ==
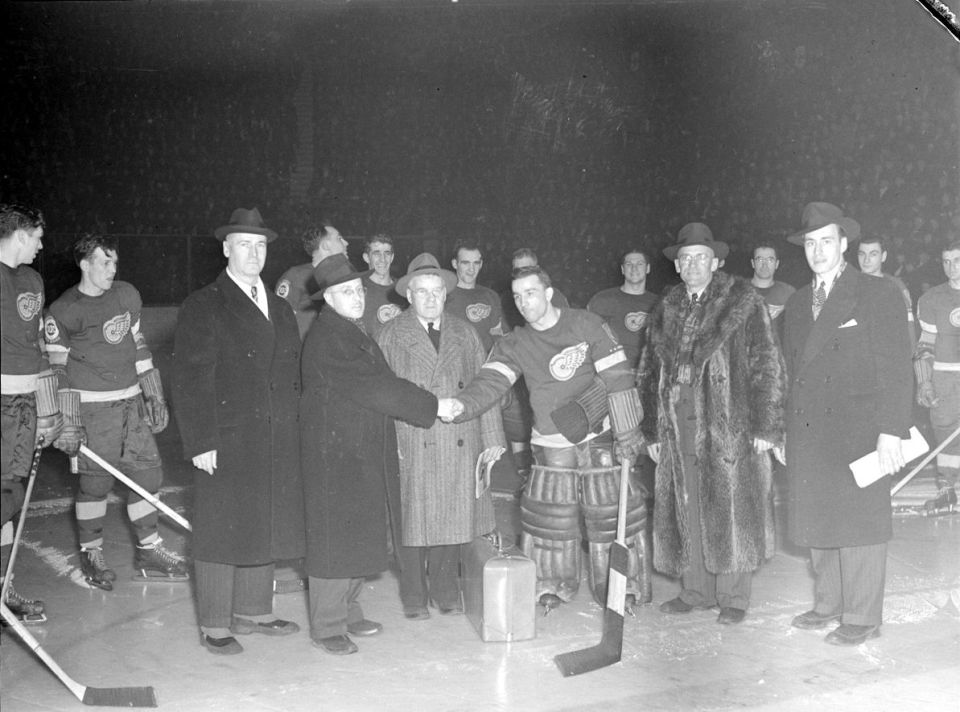
A dignitary presents a suitcase to Connie Dion during a hockey game between the Montreal Canadiens and the Detroit Red Wings, in March 1944.

Dion had his first full season in ice hockey as a senior as a member of the Lachine Rapides of the Quebec Provincial Hockey League in 1938–39 and joined the league's Sherbrooke Red Raiders the following year. With the Red Raiders, he took part in two playoff games for the 1940 Allan Cup but lost them both after allowing 16 goals. Reporting to the Army for World War II service, he suited up for the Cornwall Flyers of the Quebec Senior Hockey League (QSHL) for three seasons (the team was renamed Cornwall Army in 1942). He was traded to the Washington Lions of the American Hockey League in 1941, but did not report.

In 1943 Dion, after being discharged from the army, was among those selected to help replace Vezina Trophy-winning goalie Johnny Mowers of the National Hockey League's Detroit Red Wings, who had enlisted in the army to fight in World War II. He played a total of 38 NHL games with the Red Wings between 1943 and 1945, exiting the league with a record of 23–11–4 and having allowed 119 goals. He recorded a 15–0 shutout against the New York Rangers on January 23, 1944, two days before being signed as a free agent with Detroit. This remains, as of 2015, the most lopsided shutout in NHL history. He also took part in all five of Detroit's games in the 1944 Stanley Cup playoffs, where the Red Wings were eliminated four games to one in the opening round by the eventual runner-up, the Chicago Black Hawks. Dion spent much of the 1944–45 season, meanwhile, with the Red Wings' AHL affiliate Indianapolis Capitals. In August 1945, after the Red Wings decided to replace Mowers permanently with Harry Lumley, Dion was traded to the St. Louis Flyers of the AHL, and then to the league's Buffalo Bisons just over two months later. He remained with the Bisons through 1951 and won the Harry Hap Holmes Memorial Award in 1950, given annually to goaltenders with the lowest goals against average (GAA) in the AHL. He was also selected to the league's Second All-Star Team three times.

During his time with the Bisons, Dion appeared intermittently for other teams including the Houston Huskies (1947–48) and Louisville Blades (1949–50) of the United States Hockey League, and the New York Rovers (1948–49) of the QSHL (during the Eastern Hockey League's season-long hiatus). He took the 1951–52 season off before returning with the Sherbrooke Saints of the Quebec Major Hockey League in 1952. He finished his career with the Glace Bay Miners of the Maritime Major Hockey League in 1953–54. During his playing career he stood 5 feet, 4 inches (163 centimeters) and weighed 140 pounds (64 kilograms), making him the second-shortest player in NHL history, behind Roy Worters.

== Later life ==
Dion moved to Asbestos, Quebec, after the conclusion of his hockey career and became involved in the local minor hockey movement, often in the capacity of a referee. He helped establish an arena in the city, the Centre Récréatif d'Asbestos, in 1954, which was later renamed Aréna Connie Dion. Since 1991, the Asbestos Minor Hockey Association has held an annual tournament at the arena in his honor. He also became involved in golf, designing several courses and helping lay foundations for the sport in Asbestos. He had a local tournament named after him in this sport as well, the inaugural edition of which was held in 1973. He was married to Muriel Flanigan, who died in 2011 and had four sons, Paul, Skip, Bob, and Mickey, and one daughter, Carol-Ann. He died on November 7, 2014, at the age of 96 at the Centre de Santé et Service Sociaux in Asbestos, following two weeks of hospitalization.

== Career statistics ==
=== Regular season and playoffs ===
			Regular season								Playoffs
Season	Team	League	GP	W	L	T	MIN	GA	SO	GAA	GP	W	L	MIN	GA	SO	GAA
1937–38	Verdun Junior Maple Leafs	QJHL	12	—	—	—	720	22	2	1.83	4	—	—	240	11	0	2.75
1937–38	Verdun Maple Leafs	QSHL	1	1	0	0	60	2	0	2.00	—	—	—	—	—	—	—
1937–38	Verdun Junior Maple Leafs	M-Cup	—	—	—	—	—	—	—	—	5	2	2	300	14	2	2.80
1938–39	Lachine Rapides	QPHL	38	—	—	—	2280	126	2	3.32	6	—	—	360	20	0	3.33
1939–40	Sherbrooke Red Raiders	QPHL	41	—	—	—	2460	130	4	3.17	8	6	2	480	22	1	2.75
1939–40	Sherbrooke Red Raiders	Al-Cup	—	—	—	—	—	—	—	—	2	0	2	120	16	0	8.00
1940–41	Cornwall Flyers	QSHL	34	—	—	—	2040	122	1	3.59	4	—	—	240	14	0	3.50
1941–42	Cornwall Flyers	QSHL	37	20	14	3	2200	127	1	3.30	5	2	3	310	19	0	3.68
1942–43	Cornwall Army	QSHL	5	—	—	—	280	14	0	3.00	—	—	—	—	—	—	—
1943–44	Detroit Red Wings	NHL	26	17	7	2	1560	80	1	3.08	5	1	4	300	17	0	3.40
1944–45	Detroit Red Wings	NHL	12	6	4	2	720	39	0	3.25	—	—	—	—	—	—	—
1944–45	Indianapolis Capitals	AHL	39	19	14	6	2340	121	3	3.10	5	1	4	300	18	0	3.60
1945–46	St. Louis Flyers	AHL	8	1	6	1	480	40	0	5.00	—	—	—	—	—	—	—
1945–46	Buffalo Bisons	AHL	34	24	6	4	2040	84	1	2.47	12	8	4	730	35	1	2.88
1946–47	Buffalo Bisons	AHL	61	33	17	11	3660	166	6	2.72	4	2	2	240	13	0	3.25
1947–48	Buffalo Bisons	AHL	43	26	15	2	2580	155	2	3.60	8	4	4	480	28	0	3.50
1947–48	Houston Huskies	USHL	7	4	3	0	420	30	0	4.29	—	—	—	—	—	—	—
1948–49	Buffalo Bisons	AHL	68	33	27	8	4080	213	4	3.13	—	—	—	—	—	—	—
1948–49	New York Rovers	QSHL	1	1	0	0	60	2	0	2.00	—	—	—	—	—	—	—
1949–50	Buffalo Bisons	AHL	34	15	15	4	2040	92	3	2.71	2	0	2	120	1	0	5.50
1949–50	Louisville Blades	USHL	4	0	4	0	240	27	0	6.75	—	—	—	—	—	—	—
1950–51	Buffalo Bisons	AHL	63	35	24	4	3840	259	1	4.05	4	0	4	273	19	0	4.18
1952–53	Sherbrooke Saints	QMHL	13	3	7	3	820	38	1	2.78	7	3	4	430	21	0	2.93
1953–54	Glace Bay Miners	MMHL	18	7	9	1	1079	85	0	4.73	—	—	—	—	—	—	—
AHL totals			350	181	129	40	21,060	1130	20	3.22	35	15	20	2143	124	1	3.47
NHL totals			38	23	11	4	2280	119	1	3.13	5	1	4	300	17	0	3.40
