= Dallas Ice Arena =

US stadium

Coordinates: 32.7761°N 96.7574°W

Dallas Ice Arena was an indoor arena in Dallas, Texas. It hosted the United States Hockey League's Dallas Texans from 1945 to 1949. The arena held 8,900 people.
