= 1942–43 Chicago Black Hawks season =

NHL ice hockey team season

1942–43 Chicago Black Hawks
- League: 5th NHL
- 1942–43 record: 17–18–15
- Home record: 14–3–8
- Road record: 3–15–7
- Goals for: 179
- Goals against: 180

Team information
- General manager: Bill Tobin
- Coach: Paul Thompson
- Captain: Doug Bentley
- Arena: Chicago Stadium

Team leaders
- Goals: Doug Bentley (33)
- Assists: Max Bentley (44)
- Points: Doug Bentley (73)
- Penalty minutes: Earl Seibert (48)
- Wins: Bert Gardiner (17)
- Goals against average: Bert Gardiner (3.58)

The 1942–43 Chicago Black Hawks season was the team's 17th season in the National Hockey League, and they were coming off a 4th-place finish in 1941–42, and lost to the Boston Bruins in the opening round of the playoffs. The NHL would lose another team, as the Brooklyn Americans would fold, leaving the league with only 6 clubs. The league also increased its schedule from 48 games to 50. With World War II going on, every team in the league would lose some players who left to fight in the war.

Black Hawks general manager Frederic McLaughlin, who had been the GM since the Black Hawks entered the league in 1926, retired before the season began, and Bill Tobin was hired to take over.

The Black Hawks would finish just under .500, as they had a 17–18–15 record, good for 49 points and 5th place in the standings, missing the playoffs for the first time in 4 years. Chicago would score a club record 179 goals, which was the 4th highest in the league, however, they also allowed a team record 180 goals, the 3rd highest total in the league. Chicago would have a very strong home record, going 14–3–8, but would win only 3 road games, and miss the playoffs by a single point.

Doug Bentley would become the first Black Hawk to lead the NHL in scoring, as he set team records in goals (33) and points (73), while younger brother Max Bentley would set a team record with 44 assists, and finished with 70 points, and won the Lady Byng Trophy, as he would record only 2 penalty minutes all season long. Red Hamill had a strong season, scoring 28 goals. Earl Seibert once again led the defense, earning 32 points and had a club high 48 penalty minutes.

In goal, the Hawks acquired Bert Gardiner from the Montreal Canadiens before the season began, due to Sam LoPresti leaving the team to fight in the war, and Gardiner would win 17 games, posting a 3.58 GAA and had a shutout.

== Season standings ==
National Hockey League
| | | GP | W | L | T | GF | GA | DIFF | Pts |
|---|---|---|---|---|---|---|---|---|---|
| 1 | Detroit Red Wings | 50 | 25 | 14 | 11 | 169 | 124 | +45 | 61 |
| 2 | Boston Bruins | 50 | 24 | 17 | 9 | 195 | 176 | +19 | 57 |
| 3 | Toronto Maple Leafs | 50 | 22 | 19 | 9 | 198 | 159 | +39 | 53 |
| 4 | Montreal Canadiens | 50 | 19 | 19 | 12 | 181 | 191 | −10 | 50 |
| 5 | Chicago Black Hawks | 50 | 17 | 18 | 15 | 179 | 180 | −1 | 49 |
| 6 | New York Rangers | 50 | 11 | 31 | 8 | 161 | 253 | −92 | 30 |

=== Record vs. opponents ===
1942–43 NHL Records
| Team | BOS | CHI | DET | MTL | NYR | TOR |
|---|---|---|---|---|---|---|
| Boston | — | 3–4–3 | 4–4–2 | 5–4–1 | 8–2 | 4–3–3 |
| Chicago | 4–3–3 | — | 2–4–4 | 1–4–5 | 4–4–2 | 6–3–1 |
| Detroit | 4–4–2 | 4–2–4 | — | 5–3–2 | 7–1–2 | 5–4–1 |
| Montreal | 4–5–1 | 4–1–5 | 3–5–2 | — | 6–2–2 | 2–6–2 |
| New York | 2–8 | 4–4–2 | 1–7–2 | 2–6–2 | — | 2–6–2 |
| Toronto | 3–4–3 | 3–6–1 | 4–5–1 | 6–2–2 | 6–2–2 | — |

== Schedule and results ==
1942–43 regular season
November

| Game | Date | Visitor | Score | Home | Record | Points |
|---|---|---|---|---|---|---|
| 1 | November 5 | Boston Bruins | 1–5 | Chicago Black Hawks | 1–0–0 | 2 |
| 2 | November 8 | Chicago Black Hawks | 3–3 | Detroit Red Wings | 1–0–1 | 3 |
| 3 | November 10 | Chicago Black Hawks | 3–5 | New York Rangers | 1–1–1 | 3 |
| 4 | November 12 | Chicago Black Hawks | 2–5 | Montreal Canadiens | 1–2–1 | 3 |
| 5 | November 14 | Chicago Black Hawks | 4–3 | Toronto Maple Leafs | 2–2–1 | 5 |
| 6 | November 15 | Toronto Maple Leafs | 4–5 | Chicago Black Hawks | 3–2–1 | 7 |
| 7 | November 19 | Detroit Red Wings | 2–6 | Chicago Black Hawks | 4–2–1 | 9 |
| 8 | November 22 | Montreal Canadiens | 3–3 | Chicago Black Hawks | 4–2–2 | 10 |
| 9 | November 24 | Chicago Black Hawks | 5–5 | Boston Bruins | 4–2–3 | 11 |
| 10 | November 26 | New York Rangers | 2–1 | Chicago Black Hawks | 4–3–3 | 11 |
| 11 | November 29 | Toronto Maple Leafs | 2–3 | Chicago Black Hawks | 5–3–3 | 13 |

December

| Game | Date | Visitor | Score | Home | Record | Points |
|---|---|---|---|---|---|---|
| 12 | December 3 | New York Rangers | 1–3 | Chicago Black Hawks | 6–3–3 | 15 |
| 13 | December 6 | Montreal Canadiens | 2–5 | Chicago Black Hawks | 7–3–3 | 17 |
| 14 | December 8 | Chicago Black Hawks | 6–9 | Boston Bruins | 7–4–3 | 17 |
| 15 | December 10 | Chicago Black Hawks | 2–7 | Toronto Maple Leafs | 7–5–3 | 17 |
| 16 | December 13 | Toronto Maple Leafs | 2–5 | Chicago Black Hawks | 8–5–3 | 19 |
| 17 | December 17 | Detroit Red Wings | 3–1 | Chicago Black Hawks | 8–6–3 | 19 |
| 18 | December 20 | Boston Bruins | 4–4 | Chicago Black Hawks | 8–6–4 | 20 |
| 19 | December 25 | Chicago Black Hawks | 2–2 | Montreal Canadiens | 8–6–5 | 21 |
| 20 | December 27 | Chicago Black Hawks | 1–6 | Detroit Red Wings | 8–7–5 | 21 |

January

| Game | Date | Visitor | Score | Home | Record | Points |
|---|---|---|---|---|---|---|
| 21 | January 1 | New York Rangers | 5–6 | Chicago Black Hawks | 9–7–5 | 23 |
| 22 | January 3 | Chicago Black Hawks | 3–3 | New York Rangers | 9–7–6 | 24 |
| 23 | January 10 | Detroit Red Wings | 1–2 | Chicago Black Hawks | 10–7–6 | 26 |
| 24 | January 12 | Chicago Black Hawks | 0–3 | Boston Bruins | 10–8–6 | 26 |
| 25 | January 14 | Chicago Black Hawks | 1–5 | Montreal Canadiens | 10–9–6 | 26 |
| 26 | January 16 | Chicago Black Hawks | 1–1 | Detroit Red Wings | 10–9–7 | 27 |
| 27 | January 17 | Detroit Red Wings | 2–2 | Chicago Black Hawks | 10–9–8 | 28 |
| 28 | January 21 | Montreal Canadiens | 4–4 | Chicago Black Hawks | 10–9–9 | 29 |
| 29 | January 23 | Chicago Black Hawks | 3–5 | Toronto Maple Leafs | 10–10–9 | 29 |
| 30 | January 24 | Boston Bruins | 3–4 | Chicago Black Hawks | 11–10–9 | 31 |
| 31 | January 28 | New York Rangers | 1–10 | Chicago Black Hawks | 12–10–9 | 33 |
| 32 | January 31 | Toronto Maple Leafs | 3–3 | Chicago Black Hawks | 12–10–10 | 34 |

February

| Game | Date | Visitor | Score | Home | Record | Points |
|---|---|---|---|---|---|---|
| 33 | February 2 | Chicago Black Hawks | 3–5 | Boston Bruins | 12–11–10 | 34 |
| 34 | February 4 | Chicago Black Hawks | 1–1 | New York Rangers | 12–11–11 | 35 |
| 35 | February 7 | New York Rangers | 4–8 | Chicago Black Hawks | 13–11–11 | 37 |
| 36 | February 11 | Chicago Black Hawks | 3–5 | Montreal Canadiens | 13–12–11 | 37 |
| 37 | February 13 | Chicago Black Hawks | 2–3 | Toronto Maple Leafs | 13–13–11 | 37 |
| 38 | February 14 | Boston Bruins | 2–3 | Chicago Black Hawks | 14–13–11 | 39 |
| 39 | February 18 | Montreal Canadiens | 5–4 | Chicago Black Hawks | 14–14–11 | 39 |
| 40 | February 21 | Toronto Maple Leafs | 0–5 | Chicago Black Hawks | 15–14–11 | 41 |
| 41 | February 23 | Chicago Black Hawks | 7–5 | Boston Bruins | 16–14–11 | 43 |
| 42 | February 25 | Chicago Black Hawks | 4–7 | New York Rangers | 16–15–11 | 43 |
| 43 | February 27 | Chicago Black Hawks | 4–1 | Toronto Maple Leafs | 17–15–11 | 45 |
| 44 | February 28 | Boston Bruins | 4–4 | Chicago Black Hawks | 17–15–12 | 46 |

March

| Game | Date | Visitor | Score | Home | Record | Points |
|---|---|---|---|---|---|---|
| 45 | March 6 | Chicago Black Hawks | 0–5 | Detroit Red Wings | 17–16–12 | 46 |
| 46 | March 7 | Detroit Red Wings | 3–3 | Chicago Black Hawks | 17–16–13 | 47 |
| 47 | March 11 | Montreal Canadiens | 4–4 | Chicago Black Hawks | 17–16–14 | 48 |
| 48 | March 13 | Chicago Black Hawks | 6–6 | Montreal Canadiens | 17–16–15 | 49 |
| 49 | March 14 | Chicago Black Hawks | 5–7 | New York Rangers | 17–17–15 | 49 |
| 50 | March 18 | Chicago Black Hawks | 5–6 | Detroit Red Wings | 17–18–15 | 49 |

Legend: Win (2 points) Loss (0 points) Tie (1 point)

== Season stats ==
=== Scoring leaders ===
| Player | GP | G | A | Pts | PIM |
|---|---|---|---|---|---|
| Doug Bentley | 50 | 33 | 40 | 73 | 18 |
| Max Bentley | 47 | 26 | 44 | 70 | 2 |
| Red Hamill | 50 | 28 | 16 | 44 | 44 |
| Bill Thoms | 47 | 15 | 28 | 43 | 11 |
| Mush March | 50 | 7 | 29 | 36 | 46 |

=== Goaltending ===
| Player | GP | TOI | W | L | T | GA | SO | GAA |
| Bert Gardiner | 50 | 3020 | 17 | 18 | 15 | 180 | 1 | 3.58 |
