= Dallas Texans (ice hockey) =

- City: Dallas, Texas
- League: American Hockey Association (AHA); United States Hockey League (USHL)
- Operated: 1941–1942; 1945–1949
- Colors: red, white

The Dallas Texans were a professional ice hockey team in Dallas, Texas. They were a member of the American Hockey Association in 1941–42 and later the United States Hockey League from 1945 to 1949. They played their home games in the Dallas Ice Arena.

== Year-by-year results ==
=== AHA ===
| Season | W | L | T | Pts | Finish | Coach(es) | Postseason |
|---|---|---|---|---|---|---|---|
| 1941–42 | 12 | 34 | 4 | 28 | 4th in South | Leroy Goldsworthy | —N/a |

=== USHL ===
| Season | W | L | T | Pts | Finish | Coach(es) | Postseason |
|---|---|---|---|---|---|---|---|
| 1945–46 | 21 | 32 | 3 | 45 | 6th | Leroy Goldsworthy | —N/a |
| 1946–47 | 27 | 18 | 15 | 69 | 1st in South | Murray Armstrong and George Boothman | Playoffs, Rd. 1 |
| 1947–48 | 21 | 39 | 6 | 48 | 4th in South | Bud Cook | —N/a |
| 1948–49 | 24 | 27 | 15 | 63 | 2nd in South | Bud Cook | Playoffs, Rd. 2 |
