= Alvin Jones (ice hockey) =

Canadian ice hockey player

- Born: August 17, 1917; Owen Sound, Ontario, Canada
- Died: August 23, 2007 (aged 90); Tampa, Florida, U.S.
- Height: 5 ft 11 in (180 cm)
- Weight: 200 lb (91 kg; 14 st 4 lb)
- Position: Defence
- Shot: Right
- Played for: Toronto Maple Leafs; Detroit Red Wings
- Playing career: 1937–1955

Alvin Bernard "Buck" Jones (August 17, 1917 – August 23, 2007) was a Canadian professional ice hockey defenceman who played 50 games in the National Hockey League for the Toronto Maple Leafs and Detroit Red Wings between 1939 and 1943. The rest of his career, which lasted from 1937 to 1955, was spent in various minor leagues. He was born in Owen Sound, Ontario.

== Career statistics ==
=== Regular season and playoffs ===
			Regular season					Playoffs
Season	Team	League	GP	G	A	Pts	PIM	GP	G	A	Pts	PIM
1936–37	Barrie Flyers	OHA-B	—	—	—	—	—	—	—	—	—	—
1937–38	Harringay Greyhounds	ENL	—	2	2	4	—	—	—	—	—	—
1938–39	Harringay Greyhounds	ENL	—	1	2	3	—	—	—	—	—	—
1938–39	Detroit Red Wings	NHL	11	0	2	2	6	6	0	1	1	10
1938–39	Pittsburgh Hornets	IAHL	40	2	8	10	37	—	—	—	—	—
1939–40	Detroit Red Wings	NHL	2	0	0	0	0	—	—	—	—	—
1939–40	Indianapolis Capitals	IAHL	56	6	6	12	70	5	0	2	2	12
1940–41	Indianapolis Capitals	AHL	54	4	5	9	78	—	—	—	—	—
1941–42	Detroit Red Wings	NHL	21	2	1	3	8	—	—	—	—	—
1941–42	Indianapolis Capitals	AHL	13	4	1	5	27	—	—	—	—	—
1941–42	Providence Reds	AHL	19	5	8	13	22	—	—	—	—	—
1942–43	Providence Reds	AHL	39	4	11	15	79	—	—	—	—	—
1942–43	Toronto Maple Leafs	NHL	16	0	0	0	22	6	0	0	0	8
1943–44	Toronto Army Daggers	OHA Sr	1	0	0	0	0	—	—	—	—	—
1943–44	Kingston Army	OHA Sr	4	0	3	3	6	—	—	—	—	—
1946–47	Tulsa Oilers	USHL	58	7	4	11	127	5	0	1	1	12
1947–48	Tulsa Oilers	USHL	65	3	6	9	47	2	0	0	0	2
1948–49	Hershey Bears	AHL	65	1	5	6	76	11	0	2	2	17
1949–50	Hershey Bears	AHL	66	0	6	6	60	—	—	—	—	—
1950–51	Tulsa Oilers	USHL	57	0	10	10	72	6	0	4	4	4
1951–52	Tacoma Rockets	PCHL	70	1	3	4	140	6	0	0	0	14
1952–53	Tacoma Rockets	WHL	69	7	14	21	105	—	—	—	—	—
1953–54	Seattle Bombers	WHL	26	1	1	2	34	—	—	—	—	—
1953–54	Nelson Maple Leafs	WIHL	7	0	0	0	10	8	1	0	1	12
1953–54	Nelson Maple Leafs	Al-Cup	—	—	—	—	—	8	0	1	1	4
1954–55	Valleyfield Braves	QSHL	19	0	3	3	4	—	—	—	—	—
IAHL/AHL totals			352	26	50	76	449	16	0	4	4	29
NHL totals			50	2	3	5	36	12	0	1	1	18
