= Marcel Dheere =

Canadian ice hockey player

- Marcel Dheere
- Born: December 19, 1918; Saint Boniface, Manitoba, Canada
- Died: November 5, 2002 (aged 83); Winnipeg, Manitoba, Canada
- Height: 5 ft 7 in (170 cm)
- Weight: 175 lb (79 kg; 12 st 7 lb)
- Position: Left wing
- Shot: Left
- Played for: Montreal Canadiens
- Playing career: 1940–1952

Marcel Albert "Ching" Dheere (December 19, 1918 – November 5, 2002) was a Canadian professional ice hockey forward. He played 11 games in the National Hockey League for the Montreal Canadiens during the 1942–43 season. The rest of his career, which lasted from 1940 to 1953, was spent in the minor leagues. He was born in Saint Boniface, Manitoba.

== Career statistics ==
=== Regular season and playoffs ===
			Regular season					Playoffs
Season	Team	League	GP	G	A	Pts	PIM	GP	G	A	Pts	PIM
1939–40	Treherne Indians	MJHL	—	—	—	—	—	—	—	—	—	—
1940–41	Portland Buckaroos	PCHL	48	18	6	24	58	—	—	—	—	—
1941–42	Montreal Senior Canadiens	QSHL	37	7	3	10	67	6	0	0	0	2
1942–43	Montreal Canadiens	NHL	11	1	2	3	2	5	0	0	0	6
1942–43	Montreal Senior Canadiens	QSHL	25	2	7	9	12	—	—	—	—	—
1943–44	Montreal Canada Car	MCHL	1	0	2	2	0	—	—	—	—	—
1943–44	Montreal RCAF	MNDHL	4	0	0	0	0	—	—	—	—	—
1945–46	Hull Volants	QSHL	28	10	9	19	15	—	—	—	—	—
1946–47	Houston Huskies	USHL	58	20	28	48	22	—	—	—	—	—
1947–48	Houston Huskies	USHL	18	8	9	17	4	—	—	—	—	—
1947–48	Tulsa Oilers	USHL	38	15	15	30	10	2	0	0	0	0
1948–49	Tulsa Oilers	USHL	66	20	35	55	18	7	1	2	3	2
1949–50	Tulsa Oilers	USHL	6	1	3	4	2	—	—	—	—	—
1949–50	St. Paul Saints	USHL	15	3	7	10	2	3	0	0	0	2
1949–50	Tacoma Rockets	PCHL	47	16	33	49	12	—	—	—	—	—
1950–51	Tacoma Rockets	PCHL	45	9	16	25	14	6	0	2	2	0
1951–52	Vernon Canadians	QMHL	43	14	24	38	33	—	—	—	—	—
1952–53	Melville Millionaires	SSHL	32	7	21	28	22	3	0	2	2	0
USHL totals			201	67	97	164	58	12	1	2	3	4
NHL totals			11	1	2	3	2	5	0	0	0	6
