= Vic Myles =

Canadian ice hockey player

- Born: November 12, 1914; Fairlight, Saskatchewan, Canada
- Died: August 21, 1983 (aged 68); Moose Jaw, Saskatchewan, Canada
- Height: 6 ft 1 in (185 cm)
- Weight: 220 lb (100 kg; 15 st 10 lb)
- Position: Defence
- Shot: Right
- Played for: New York Rangers
- Playing career: 1933–1951

Victor Robert William Myles (November 12, 1914 – August 21, 1983) was a Canadian professional ice hockey player. He played 45 games in the National Hockey League for the New York Rangers during the 1942–43 season. The rest of his career, which lasted from 1933 to 1951, was spent in the minor leagues. He died in Moose Jaw, Saskatchewan in 1983 and is buried at Rosedale Cemetery.

== Career statistics ==
=== Regular season and playoffs ===
			Regular season					Playoffs
Season	Team	League	GP	G	A	Pts	PIM	GP	G	A	Pts	PIM
1931–32	Moose Jaw Cubs	S-SJHL	—	—	—	—	—	—	—	—	—	—
1931–32	Moose Jaw Cubs	M-Cup	—	—	—	—	—	4	0	0	0	4
1932–33	Moose Jaw Cubs	S-SJHL	—	—	—	—	—	2	0	0	0	2
1932–33	Moose Jaw Cubs	M-Cup	—	—	—	—	—	2	0	0	0	2
1933–34	Moose Jaw Crescents	S-SSHL	20	9	2	11	38	3	0	1	1	7
1934–35	North Battleford Beavers	N-SSHL	20	4	3	7	45	6	4	4	8	16
1935–36	North Battleford Beavers	N-SSHL	16	10	9	19	38	3	2	0	2	2
1936–37	North Battleford Beavers	N-SSHL	25	2	10	12	74	4	1	4	5	6
1937–38	Moose Jaw Millers	S-SSHL	23	9	17	26	63	6	4	2	6	8
1938–39	Moose Jaw Millers	SSHL	29	12	12	24	42	10	2	2	4	14
1939–40	Philadelphia Ramblers	IAHL	50	7	8	15	60	—	—	—	—	—
1940–41	New Haven Eagles	AHL	55	5	9	14	96	—	—	—	—	—
1941–42	New Haven Eagles	AHL	56	8	19	27	88	—	—	—	—	—
1942–43	New York Rangers	NHL	45	6	8	14	57	—	—	—	—	—
1942–43	New Haven Eagles	AHL	4	0	3	3	8	—	—	—	—	—
1943–44	Moose Jaw Victorias	SSHL	18	10	14	24	26	—	—	—	—	—
1943–44	Flin Flon Bombers	SSHL	4	5	2	7	13	—	—	—	—	—
1943–44	Flin Flon Bombers	Al-Cup	—	—	—	—	—	4	0	2	2	10
1945–46	Tulsa Oilers	USHL	53	22	26	48	56	13	7	6	13	27
1946–47	St. Paul Saints	USHL	58	14	27	41	73	—	—	—	—	—
1947–48	Regina Capitals	WCSHL	47	11	8	19	62	4	3	2	5	6
1948–49	Regina Capitals	WCSHL	45	12	10	22	87	8	1	7	8	6
1948–49	Regina Capitals	Al-Cup	—	—	—	—	—	14	3	11	14	32
1949–50	Saskatoon Quakers	WCSHL	50	7	15	22	99	5	0	0	0	10
1950–51	Regina Capitals	WCSHL	28	6	11	17	39	—	—	—	—	—
WCSHL totals			170	36	44	80	287	17	4	9	13	22
NHL totals			45	6	8	14	57	—	—	—	—	—
