= George Boothman =

Canadian ice hockey player

- Born: September 25, 1916; Calgary, Alberta, Canada
- Died: September 13, 2003 (aged 86)
- Height: 6 ft 6 in (198 cm)
- Weight: 175 lb (79 kg; 12 st 7 lb)
- Position: Centre
- Shot: Right
- Played for: Toronto Maple Leafs
- Playing career: 1938–1950

George Edward Boothman (September 25, 1916 – September 13, 2003) was a Canadian professional ice hockey centre. He played 58 regular season and 5 playoff games for the Toronto Maple Leafs of the National Hockey League (NHL) between 1942 and 1944. The rest of his career, which lasted from 1938 to 1950, was spent in various minor leagues.

== Career statistics ==
=== Regular season and playoffs ===
			Regular season					Playoffs
Season	Team	League	GP	G	A	Pts	PIM	GP	G	A	Pts	PIM
1938–39	Calgary Stampeders	ASHL	4	0	0	0	0	—	—	—	—	—
1939–40	Turner Valley Oilers	ASHL	9	0	1	1	0	—	—	—	—	—
1940–41	Nelson Maple Leafs	WKHL	29	6	11	17	30	2	0	1	1	0
1941–42	Sydney Millionaires	CBSHL	41	15	15	30	48	—	—	—	—	—
1942–43	Toronto Maple Leafs	NHL	9	1	1	2	4	—	—	—	—	—
1942–43	Providence Reds	AHL	35	7	18	25	18	2	0	1	1	2
1943–44	Toronto Maple Leafs	NHL	49	16	18	34	14	5	2	1	3	2
1944–45	Buffalo Bisons	AHL	41	12	29	41	25	6	4	0	4	2
1945–46	New Haven Eagles	AHL	14	5	8	13	11	—	—	—	—	—
1945–46	Providence Reds	AHL	23	5	4	9	6	—	—	—	—	—
1945–46	Buffalo Bisons	AHL	15	2	3	5	4	12	5	6	11	0
1946–47	Dallas Texans	USHL	4	1	2	3	2	—	—	—	—	—
1947–48	San Diego Skyhawks	PCHL	56	18	18	36	17	14	3	3	6	14
1948–49	Milwaukee Clarks	IHL	32	13	20	33	26	8	4	4	8	17
1949–50	Milwaukee Clarks	EAHL	6	0	3	3	2	—	—	—	—	—
AHL totals			128	31	62	93	64	20	9	7	16	4
NHL totals			58	17	19	36	18	5	2	1	3	2
