= Rhys Thomson =

Canadian ice hockey player

- Born: August 9, 1918; Toronto, Ontario, Canada
- Died: April 21, 2012 (aged 80)
- Height: 6 ft 1 in (185 cm)
- Weight: 195 lb (88 kg; 13 st 13 lb)
- Position: Defence
- Shot: Left
- Played for: Montreal Canadiens; Toronto Maple Leafs
- Playing career: 1938–1946

Rhys Greenaway "Tommy" Thomson (August 9, 1918 – October 12, 1993) was a Canadian professional ice hockey defenceman who played 25 games in the National Hockey League for the Montreal Canadiens and Toronto Maple Leafs between 1940 and 1942. The rest of his career, which lasted from 1938 to 1946, was spent in various minor leagues.

Thomson was born in Toronto, Ontario.

== Career statistics ==
=== Regular season and playoffs ===
			Regular season					Playoffs
Season	Team	League	GP	G	A	Pts	PIM	GP	G	A	Pts	PIM
1935–36	Toronto Young Rangers	OHA	9	3	2	5	20	2	0	0	0	2
1936–37	Toronto Young Rangers	OHA	11	1	2	3	13	3	0	0	0	2
1937–38	Toronto Young Rangers	OHA	9	5	2	7	13	3	2	1	3	8
1938–39	New Haven Eagles	IAHL	19	1	3	4	6	—	—	—	—	—
1939–40	Montreal Canadiens	NHL	7	0	0	0	16	—	—	—	—	—
1939–40	New Haven Eagles	IAHL	18	0	1	1	16	—	—	—	—	—
1940–41	Springfield Indians	AHL	51	3	7	10	30	—	—	—	—	—
1941–42	Springfield Indians	AHL	50	1	15	16	39	—	—	—	—	—
1942–43	Toronto Maple Leafs	NHL	18	0	2	2	22	—	—	—	—	—
1942–43	Providence Reds	AHL	23	2	12	14	48	2	0	0	0	0
1943–44	Kingston Army	OHA Sr	2	0	0	0	4	—	—	—	—	—
1944–45	Toronto Army Daggers	OHA Sr	2	0	0	0	0	—	—	—	—	—
1944–45	Toronto Army Shamrocks	TIHL	18	2	5	7	26	1	0	2	2	2
1944–45	Toronto Army Daggers	TNDHL	—	—	—	—	—	2	2	1	3	2
1945–46	Toronto Staffords	TIHL	14	2	2	4	19	10	2	0	2	8
IAHL/AHL totals			161	7	38	45	133	2	0	0	0	0
NHL totals			25	0	2	2	38	—	—	—	—	—
