= Oscar Aubuchon =

Canadian ice hockey player (1917–1970)

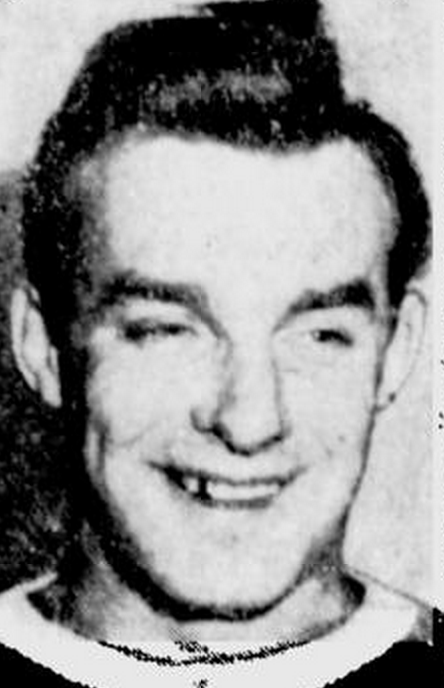
- Aubuchon pictured in a 1943 newspaper
- Born: January 2, 1917 Saint-Hyacinthe, Quebec, Canada
- Died: September 10, 1970 (aged 53) Saint-Hyacinthe, Quebec, Canada
- Height: 5 ft 11 in (180 cm)
- Weight: 170 lb (77 kg; 12 st 2 lb)
- Position: Left wing
- Shot: Left
- Played for: NHL; Boston Bruins; New York Rangers; AHL; Pittsburgh Hornets; New Haven Eagles; Cleveland Barons; Providence Reds; Buffalo Bisons; Hershey Bears; St. Louis Flyers
- Playing career: 1936–1947

Joseph Oscar Aubuchon (January 2, 1917 – September 10, 1970) was a Canadian professional ice hockey left winger who played 50 games with the Boston Bruins and New York Rangers over two National Hockey League seasons from 1942 to 1944. The rest of his career, which lasted from 1936 to 1947, saw him play mainly in the minor American Hockey League, though he also spent two seasons in the English National League during the 1930s. He was born in Saint-Hyacinthe, Quebec.

== Playing career ==
Aubuchon began his career with the Montreal Jr. Canadiens in 1934 before moving to Britain. He returned to North America in 1939 and was signed by the Bruins for the 1942–43 NHL season, yet spent most of the season with Providence of the AHL. Nine games into the following season he was traded to the Rangers as a war replacement (had received a medical discharge). He would go on to play with other minor pro teams, as well as the Quebec Senior Hockey League.

Oscar Aubuchon also coached the Drummondville Eagles and they won the Allan Cup in 1967. After his playing days he coached many years for amateur hockey teams in Quebec.

== Career statistics ==
=== Regular season and playoffs ===
			Regular season					Playoffs
Season	Team	League	GP	G	A	Pts	PIM	GP	G	A	Pts	PIM
1934–35	Montreal Victorias	MCJHL	—	—	—	—	—	1	0	0	0	0
1935–36	Montreal Junior Canadiens	MCJHL	1	1	0	1	0	—	—	—	—	—
1935–36	Montreal Senior Canadiens	MCHL	17	0	3	3	4	—	—	—	—	—
1936–37	Montreal Senior Canadiens	MCHL	17	7	2	9	16	—	—	—	—	—
1937–38	Brighton Tigers	ENL	—	19	12	31	—	—	—	—	—	—
1938–39	Brighton Tigers	ENL	—	36	20	56	—	—	—	—	—	—
1939–40	Pittsburgh Hornets	IAHL	37	4	19	23	6	9	1	2	3	4
1940–41	Cleveland Barons	AHL	47	7	11	18	14	8	1	1	2	2
1940–41	New Haven Eagles	AHL	1	0	1	1	0	—	—	—	—	—
1941–42	Providence Reds	AHL	52	14	19	33	27	—	—	—	—	—
1942–43	Boston Bruins	NHL	3	3	0	3	0	6	1	0	1	0
1942–43	Providence Reds	AHL	45	29	35	64	9	—	—	—	—	—
1943–44	Boston Bruins	NHL	9	1	0	1	0	—	—	—	—	—
1943–44	New York Rangers	NHL	38	16	12	28	4	—	—	—	—	—
1944–45	Buffalo Bisons	AHL	57	13	17	30	9	2	0	0	0	0
1945–46	Hershey Bears	AHL	4	1	1	2	5	—	—	—	—	—
1945–46	St. Louis Flyers	AHL	32	8	9	17	9	—	—	—	—	—
1946–47	Shawinigan Falls Cataractes	QSHL	10	6	1	7	2	—	—	—	—	—
AHL totals			238	72	93	165	73	10	1	1	2	2
NHL totals			50	20	12	32	4	6	1	0	1	0
