= Jackie Hamilton (ice hockey) =

Canadian ice hockey player

- Born: June 2, 1925 Trenton, Ontario, Canada
- Died: March 20, 1994 (aged 68)
- Height: 5 ft 7 in (170 cm)
- Weight: 170 lb (77 kg; 12 st 2 lb)
- Position: Centre
- Shot: Left
- Played for: Toronto Maple Leafs
- Playing career: 1941–1958

John McIvor Hamilton (June 2, 1925 – March 20, 1994) was a Canadian ice hockey centre who played 102 games in the National Hockey League between 1943 and 1946. The rest of his career, which lasted from 1941 to 1958, was spent in various minor leagues.

== Career statistics ==
=== Regular season and playoffs ===
			Regular season					Playoffs
Season	Team	League	GP	G	A	Pts	PIM	GP	G	A	Pts	PIM
1939–40	Toronto Young Rangers	OHA	13	0	0	0	0	2	0	0	0	0
1940–41	Toronto Young Rangers	OHA	7	2	0	2	0	5	0	0	0	0
1941–42	Toronto Young Rangers	OHA	17	9	8	17	9	6	2	5	7	0
1941–42	Toronto Kodaks	TMHL	11	10	4	14	2	5	0	1	1	0
1942–43	Toronto Staffords	TIHL	9	7	4	11	6	—	—	—	—	—
1942–43	Toronto Maple Leafs	NHL	13	1	6	7	4	6	1	1	2	0
1943–44	Toronto Maple Leafs	NHL	49	20	17	37	4	5	1	0	1	0
1944–45	Cornwallis Navy	NSDHL	13	10	8	18	6	3	2	3	5	0
1945–46	Pittsburgh Hornets	AHL	8	5	3	8	2	—	—	—	—	—
1945–46	Toronto Maple Leafs	NHL	40	7	9	16	12	—	—	—	—	—
1946–47	Pittsburgh Hornets	AHL	64	27	41	68	63	—	—	—	—	—
1947–48	Pittsburgh Hornets	AHL	67	21	29	50	52	2	0	0	0	5
1948–49	Providence Reds	AHL	59	26	54	80	32	14	3	6	9	6
1949–50	Providence Reds	AHL	55	19	35	54	20	4	2	2	4	0
1950–51	Providence Reds	AHL	45	21	26	47	29	—	—	—	—	—
1950–51	St. Louis Flyers	AHL	22	12	18	30	10	—	—	—	—	—
1951–52	St. Louis Flyers	AHL	67	27	50	77	34	—	—	—	—	—
1952–53	Shawinigan Falls Cataracts	QSHL	17	3	7	10	31	—	—	—	—	—
1952–53	New Westminster Royals	WHL	45	12	19	31	52	7	1	2	3	2
1953–54	New Westminster Royals	WHL	63	15	31	46	54	7	2	3	5	8
1954–55	Ayr Centennials	OHA Sr	40	7	30	37	0	—	—	—	—	—
1954–55	Ayr Centennials	Al-Cup	—	—	—	—	—	17	4	10	14	4
1955–56	Owen Sound Mercurys	OHA Sr	48	18	35	53	0	—	—	—	—	—
1956–57	Owen Sound Mercurys	OHA Sr	8	0	5	5	16	—	—	—	—	—
1956–57	Troy Bruins	IHL	15	3	4	7	18	—	—	—	—	—
1957–58	North Bay Trappers	OHA Sr	10	0	4	4	14	—	—	—	—	—
AHL totals			387	158	256	414	252	32	8	13	21	24
NHL totals			102	28	32	60	20	11	2	1	3	0
