= 1943–44 NHL season =

Professional ice hockey league season

- League: National Hockey League
- Sport: Ice hockey
- Duration: October 30, 1943 – April 13, 1944
- Games: 50
- Teams: 6

Regular season
- Season champion: Montreal Canadiens
- Season MVP: Babe Pratt (Maple Leafs)
- Top scorer: Herb Cain (Bruins)

Stanley Cup
- Champions: Montreal Canadiens
- Runners-up: Chicago Black Hawks

NHL seasons
- ← 1942–43 1944–45 →

The 1943–44 NHL season was the 27th season of the National Hockey League. Six teams played 50 games each. The Montreal Canadiens were the top team of the regular season and followed it up with the team's fifth Stanley Cup championship.

== League business ==
In memory of Frank Calder, the former NHL President who died in 1943, the league's Board of Governors donated the Calder Memorial Trophy to be awarded to the NHL's top rookie.

Due to World War II, 75 per cent of the amateurs signed by the NHL ended up in the armed services. In April 1943, Canadian Amateur Hockey Association past-president George Dudley recommended that payments from the NHL for signing amateurs be deferred until players lost due to the wartime enlistments return to professional hockey. The NHL negotiated with W. G. Hardy and the International Ice Hockey Association to sign more junior-aged players than usual, due to World War II travel restrictions. The Canadian Press reported that Hardy was rumored to be appointed president of the NHL, to replace Red Dutton who had been acting president since the death of Calder.

=== Rule changes ===
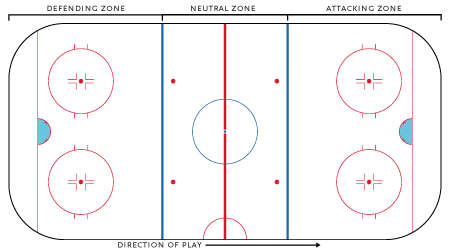
The centre red line was introduced to the ice hockey rink during the 1943–44 season.

NHL rules committee chairman Frank Boucher and Ottawa District Hockey Association executive Cecil Duncan collaborated to experiment with then introduce the centre ice red line to the hockey rink, in an effort to open up the game and allow the defending team to pass the puck out of their own zone and counter-attack quicker.

"This rule is considered to mark the beginning of the modern era in the NHL", according to the NHL's Guide and Record Book. In 2005, 62 years later, the two-line pass would be legalized for similar reasons.

== Regular season ==
The Montreal Canadiens had turned the corner and now Tommy Gorman and Dick Irvin had a team to make the fans happy. Bill Durnan solved the goaltending woes, but not before Gorman had all kinds of problems signing him. Durnan knew his worth, and wanted a handsome sum. Just before the first game, Gorman agreed to his contract demands. He was worth every penny, as he ran away with the Vezina Trophy and the Canadiens lost only five games all year, finishing first by a wide margin. The new and more familiar "Punch line" of Elmer Lach, Toe Blake, and Maurice Richard dominated the offence and Richard had 32 goals. He replaced Joe Benoit, who did his duty to his country by joining the armed forces. Richard, in fact, was dubbed by teammate Ray Getliffe the nickname that would be his legend "The Rocket".

When Paul Bibeault came back from the Army, he found his job lost to the best goaltender in the NHL, Bill Durnan. Montreal agreed to loan him to Toronto, where he played very well, leading the Leafs to third place and leading the NHL with five shutouts. Gus Bodnar, a crack centre, was the top rookie, and for the first time, a team produced Calder Memorial Trophy winners in consecutive years. In fact, Bodnar scored the fastest goal by a rookie in his very first game. It took him only 15 seconds to score on Ken McAuley, Ranger goaltender, in a 5–2 win over the war-weakened Rangers.

The Rangers had plunged to last place the previous year and Lester Patrick was so discouraged that he wanted to suspend operations for the year. This year the Rangers lost Clint Smith, Lynn Patrick, Phil Watson, and Alf Pike. The most unbelievably inept team iced for the Rangers this year. Things were so desperate that coach Frank Boucher had to come out of retirement to play some. But the Rangers set a modern-day record of 6.20 goals against, giving up 310 goals in 50 games. One night when Lester Patrick went behind the bench to coach the team with Frank Boucher attending a brother's funeral, the Rangers were demolished 15–0 by Detroit as the Red Wings set a modern-day record of most goals by a team in a single game. It was a horrifying experience for Patrick. Only a week later Syd Howe set a modern-day record of 6 goals in a game in a 12–2 conquest of the hapless Rangers. The Rangers won only 6 games all year and finished a distant last, 26 points behind fifth-place Boston.

Chicago started with sub-par goaltending, but then president and general manager Bill Tobin decided to bring back Mike Karakas, who had been demoted to the minors in 1939–40 for his lackluster play. Karakas was just what the Black Hawks needed, as he played well and recorded three shutouts and got the team into the playoffs.

In Boston, the Bruins lost star forward Bill Cowley to injury after the first 36 games. At that point in the season Cowley was on pace to set a new standard in scoring for the NHL. After the first 36 games he had scored 30 goals – 41 assists – 71 points before going down to injury. However, the scoring title would still eventually end up in Boston as linemate Herb Cain picked up the slack, scoring 82 points over the course of the 50-game schedule and setting a new record for points in the regular season.

=== Final standings ===
National Hockey League
		GP	W	L	T	GF	GA	DIFF	Pts
1	Montreal Canadiens	50	38	5	7	234	109	+125	83
2	Detroit Red Wings	50	26	18	6	214	177	+37	58
3	Toronto Maple Leafs	50	23	23	4	214	174	+40	50
4	Chicago Black Hawks	50	22	23	5	178	187	−9	49
5	Boston Bruins	50	19	26	5	223	268	−45	43
6	New York Rangers	50	6	39	5	162	310	−148	17

== Playoffs ==
=== Playoff bracket ===
The top four teams in the league qualified for the playoffs. In the semifinals, the first-place team played the third-place team, while the second-place team faced the fourth-place team, with the winners advancing to the Stanley Cup Finals. In both rounds, teams competed in a best-of-seven series (scores in the bracket indicate the number of games won in each best-of-seven series).

Semifinals
1	Montreal	4
3	Toronto	1
2	Detroit	1
4	Chicago	4

Stanley Cup Finals
1	Montreal	4
4	Chicago	0

=== Semifinals ===
==== (1) Montreal Canadiens vs. (3) Toronto Maple Leafs ====
The Montreal Canadiens finished first in the league with 83 points. The Toronto Maple Leafs finished third in the league with 50 points. This was the third playoff meeting between these two teams with the teams splitting the two previous series. They last met in the 1925 NHL Championship where Montreal won a two-game total goals series 5–2. Montreal won this year's ten game regular season series earning fifteen of twenty points. Maurice "Rocket" Richard was named first, second, and third Star of the game after scoring all 5 Montreal goals in game two, the first player to have this honour.

March 21	Toronto Maple Leafs	3–1	Montreal Canadiens	Montreal Forum	Recap
Moe Morris (1) – pp – 06:07; George Boothman (1) – pp – 18:35		First period	No scoring
Jackie Hamilton (1) – 12:24		Second period	No scoring
No scoring		Third period	02:49 – sh – Toe Blake (1)
Paul Bibeault		Goalie stats	Bill Durnan

March 23	Toronto Maple Leafs	1–5	Montreal Canadiens	Montreal Forum	Recap
No scoring		First period	No scoring
Reg Hamilton (1) – pp – 08:30		Second period	01:48 – Maurice Richard (1); 02:03 – Maurice Richard (2); 16:46 – Maurice Richard (3)
No scoring		Third period	01:00 – pp – Maurice Richard (4); 08:51 – Maurice Richard (5)
Paul Bibeault		Goalie stats	Bill Durnan

March 25	Montreal Canadiens	2–1	Toronto Maple Leafs	Maple Leaf Gardens	Recap
Glen Harmon (1) – 09:57		First period	No scoring
No scoring		Second period	08:06 – George Boothman (2)
Ray Getliffe (1) – 09:43		Third period	No scoring
Bill Durnan		Goalie stats	Paul Bibeault

March 28	Montreal Canadiens	4–1	Toronto Maple Leafs	Maple Leaf Gardens	Recap
No scoring		First period	No scoring
Gerry Heffernan (1) – 15:55; Toe Blake (2) – 18:45		Second period	No scoring
Murph Chamberlain (1) – pp – 12:57; Murph Chamberlain (2) – 19:48		Third period	09:53 – pp – Ted Kennedy (1)
Bill Durnan		Goalie stats	Paul Bibeault

March 30	Toronto Maple Leafs	0–11	Montreal Canadiens	Montreal Forum	Recap
No scoring		First period	16:02 – Ray Getliffe (2); 17:39 – Phil Watson (1)
No scoring		Second period	00:27 – Maurice Richard (6); 10:33 – sh – Murph Chamberlain (3)
No scoring		Third period	02:27 – Butch Bouchard (1); 07:58 – Toe Blake (3); 08:37 – Toe Blake (4); 09:17 – Maurice Richard (7); 10:33 – Ray Getliffe (3); 11:34 – Buddy O'Connor (1); 15:41 – pp – Murph Chamberlain (4)
Paul Bibeault		Goalie stats	Bill Durnan

Montreal won series 4–1

==== (2) Detroit Red Wings vs. (4) Chicago Black Hawks ====
The Detroit Red Wings finished second in the league with 58 points. The Chicago Black Hawks finished fourth with 49 points. This was the third playoff meeting between these two teams with the teams splitting the two previous series. They last met in the 1941 Stanley Cup Semifinals where Detroit won in two games. The teams split this year's ten-game regular season series.

March 21	Chicago Black Hawks	2–1	Detroit Red Wings	Olympia Stadium	Recap
No scoring		First period	12:18 – pp – Syd Howe (1)
No scoring		Second period	No scoring
Bill Mosienko (1) – 07:12; Doug Bentley (1) – 07:56		Third period	No scoring
Mike Karakas		Goalie stats	Connie Dion

March 23	Chicago Black Hawks	1–4	Detroit Red Wings	Olympia Stadium	Recap
No scoring		First period	No scoring
No scoring		Second period	03:00 – Joe Carveth (1); 19:10 – pp – Syd Howe (2)
George Allen (1) – 11:18; Mud Bruneteau (1) – 16:06		Third period	00:21 – Don Grosso (1)
Mike Karakas		Goalie stats	Connie Dion

March 26	Detroit Red Wings	0–2	Chicago Black Hawks	Chicago Stadium	Recap
No scoring		First period	11:06 – Joe Cooper (1)
No scoring		Second period	No scoring
No scoring		Third period	11:30 – Clint Smith (1)
Connie Dion		Goalie stats	Mike Karakas

March 28	Detroit Red Wings	1–7	Chicago Black Hawks	Chicago Stadium	Recap
Carl Liscombe (1) – 06:00		First period	04:44 – Doug Bentley (2); 11:09 – pp – Bill Mosienko (2); 16:54 – Clint Smith (2)
No scoring		Second period	01:42 – Clint Smith (3); 15:30 – Doug Bentley (3); 19:18 – Doug Bentley (4)
No scoring		Third period	19:57 – Fido Purpur (1)
Connie Dion		Goalie stats	Mike Karakas

March 30	Chicago Black Hawks	5–2	Detroit Red Wings	Olympia Stadium	Recap
Doug Bentley (5) – pp – 18:23		First period	06:59 – Bill Quackenbush (1)
No scoring		Second period	No scoring
Johnny Gottselig (1) – 03:37; Doug Bentley (6) – 08:10; Doug Bentley (7) – 12:30; George Allen (2) – 18:56		Third period	08:40 – Joe Carveth (2)
Mike Karakas		Goalie stats	Connie Dion

Chicago won series 4–1

=== Stanley Cup Finals ===
This was the sixth playoff meeting between these two teams with Chicago winning three of the five previous series. They last met in the 1941 Stanley Cup Quarterfinals where Chicago won in three games. Montreal won this year's ten game regular season series earning eighteen of twenty points.

April 4	Chicago Black Hawks	1–5	Montreal Canadiens	Montreal Forum	Recap
No scoring		First period	08:37 – Phil Watson (2)
Clint Smith (4) – pp – 10:11		Second period	06:35 – pp – Toe Blake (5); 10:58 – Ray Getliffe (4)
No scoring		Third period	04:47 – Murph Chamberlain (5); 18:07 – Ray Getliffe (5)
Mike Karakas		Goalie stats	Bill Durnan

April 6	Montreal Canadiens	3–1	Chicago Black Hawks	Chicago Stadium	Recap
No scoring		First period	No scoring
Maurice Richard (8) – 13:00		Second period	No scoring
Maurice Richard (9) – 12:16; Maurice Richard (10) – 15:33		Third period	19:59 – John Harms (1)
Bill Durnan		Goalie stats	Mike Karakas

April 9	Montreal Canadiens	3–2	Chicago Black Hawks	Chicago Stadium	Recap
No scoring		First period	05:14 – George Allen (3)
Toe Blake (6) – 02:02		Second period	No scoring
Mike McMahon (1) – 05:47; Phil Watson (3) – 06:42		Third period	04:19 – John Harms (2)
Bill Durnan		Goalie stats	Mike Karakas

April 13	Chicago Black Hawks	4–5	OT	Montreal Canadiens	Montreal Forum	Recap
George Allen (4) – 05:12		First period		08:48 – Elmer Lach (1)
John Harms (3) – pp – 07:30; George Allen (5) – pp – 09:12; Doug Bentley (8) – 10:09		Second period		No scoring
No scoring		Third period		10:02 – Elmer Lach (2); 16:05 – Maurice Richard (11); 17:20 – Maurice Richard (12)
No scoring		First overtime period		09:12 – Toe Blake (7)
Mike Karakas		Goalie stats		Bill Durnan

Montreal won series 4–0

== Awards ==
Award winners
O'Brien Cup: (Stanley Cup runner-up)	Chicago Black Hawks
Prince of Wales Trophy: (Regular season champion)	Montreal Canadiens
Calder Memorial Trophy: (Best first-year player)	Gus Bodnar, Toronto Maple Leafs
Hart Trophy: (Most valuable player)	Babe Pratt, Toronto Maple Leafs
Lady Byng Trophy: (Excellence and sportsmanship)	Clint Smith, Chicago Black Hawks
Vezina Trophy: (Fewest goals allowed)	Bill Durnan, Montreal Canadiens

All-Star teams
First team	Position	Second team
Bill Durnan, Montreal Canadiens	G	Paul Bibeault, Toronto Maple Leafs
Earl Seibert, Chicago Black Hawks	D	Emile "Butch" Bouchard, Montreal Canadiens
Babe Pratt, Toronto Maple Leafs	D	Dit Clapper, Boston Bruins
Bill Cowley, Boston Bruins	C	Elmer Lach, Montreal Canadiens
Lorne Carr, Toronto Maple Leafs	RW	Maurice Richard, Montreal Canadiens
Doug Bentley, Chicago Black Hawks	LW	Herb Cain, Boston Bruins
Dick Irvin, Montreal Canadiens	Coach	Hap Day, Toronto Maple Leafs

== Player statistics ==
=== Scoring leaders ===
Note: GP = Games played, G = Goals, A = Assists, PTS = Points, PIM = Penalties in minutes

Player	Team	GP	G	A	PTS	PIM
Herb Cain	Boston Bruins	48	36	46	82	4
Doug Bentley	Chicago Black Hawks	50	38	39	77	22
Lorne Carr	Toronto Maple Leafs	50	36	38	74	9
Carl Liscombe	Detroit Red Wings	50	36	37	73	17
Elmer Lach	Montreal Canadiens	48	24	48	72	23
Clint Smith	Chicago Black Hawks	50	23	49	72	4
Bill Cowley	Boston Bruins	36	30	41	71	12
Bill Mosienko	Chicago Black Hawks	50	32	38	70	10
Art Jackson	Boston Bruins	49	28	41	69	8
Gus Bodnar	Toronto Maple Leafs	50	22	40	62	18

Source: NHL

=== Leading goaltenders ===
Note: GP = Games played; Mins = Minutes played; GA = Goals against; GAA = Goals against average; W = Wins; L = Losses; T = Ties; SO = Shutouts

Player	Team	GP	Mins	GA	GAA	W	L	T	SO
Bill Durnan	Montreal Canadiens	50	3000	109	2.18	32	5	7	2
Paul Bibeault	Toronto Maple Leafs	29	1740	87	3.00	13	14	2	5
Mike Karakas	Chicago Black Hawks	26	1560	79	3.04	12	9	5	3
Connie Dion	Detroit Red Wings	26	1560	80	3.08	17	7	2	1
Jimmy Franks	Detroit Red Wings	17	1020	69	4.06	6	8	3	1
Benny Grant	Toronto Maple Leafs	20	1200	83	4.15	9	9	2	0
Hec Highton	Chicago Black Hawks	24	1440	108	4.50	10	14	0	0
Bert Gardiner	Boston Bruins	46	2460	212	5.17	17	19	5	1
Ken McAuley	New York Rangers	50	2980	310	6.24	6	39	5	0

== Coaches ==
- Boston Bruins: Art Ross
- Chicago Black Hawks: Paul Thompson
- Detroit Red Wings: Jack Adams
- Montreal Canadiens: Dick Irvin
- New York Rangers: Frank Boucher
- Toronto Maple Leafs: Hap Day

== Debuts ==
The following is a list of players of note who played their first NHL game in 1943–44 (listed with their first team, asterisk(*) marks debut in playoffs):

- Harry Lumley, Detroit Red Wings
- Bill Durnan, Montreal Canadiens
- Don Raleigh, New York Rangers
- Gus Bodnar, Toronto Maple Leafs

== Last games ==
The following is a list of players of note who played their last game in the NHL in 1943–44 (listed with their last team):

- Buzz Boll, Boston Bruins
- Busher Jackson, Boston Bruins
- Frank Boucher, New York Rangers

== See also ==
- 1943–44 NHL transactions
- List of Stanley Cup champions
- 1943 in sports
- 1944 in sports
