= List of NHL players (R) =

This is a list of National Hockey League (NHL) players who have played at least one game in the NHL from 1917 to present and have a last name that starts with "R".

List updated as of the 2018–19 NHL season.

== Ra ==
- Antti Raanta
- Karel Rachunek
- Andre Racicot
- Bruce Racine
- Jonathan Racine
- Yves Racine
- Darren Raddysh
- Taylor Raddysh
- Lukas Radil
- Branko Radivojevic
- Harry "Yip" Radley
- Alexander Radulov
- Igor Radulov
- Nate Raduns
- Brian Rafalski
- Brogan Rafferty
- Michael Raffl
- Clare Raglan
- Herb Raglan
- Marcus Ragnarsson
- Rickard Rakell
- Rhett Rakhshani
- Don Raleigh
- Greg Rallo
- Brad Ralph
- Jamie Ram
- John Ramage
- Rob Ramage
- Tim Ramholt
- Karri Ramo
- Beattie Ramsay
- Craig Ramsay
- Les Ramsay
- Mike Ramsey
- Wayne Ramsey
- Ken Randall
- Tyler Randell
- Bill Ranford
- Brendan Ranford
- Paul Ranger
- Paul Ranheim
- George Ranieri
- Sampo Ranta
- Mikko Rantanen
- Joonas Rask
- Tuukka Rask
- Victor Rask
- Adam Raska
- Dennis Rasmussen
- Erik Rasmussen
- Michael Rasmussen
- Peter Ratchuk
- Isaac Ratcliffe
- Jean Ratelle
- Mike Rathje
- Jake Rathwell
- Ty Rattie
- Dan Ratushny
- Aatu Raty
- Aku Raty
- Chad Rau
- Kyle Rau
- Errol Rausse
- Pekka Rautakallio
- Matt Ravlich
- Rob Ray
- Andrew Raycroft
- Alain Raymond
- Armand Raymond
- Lucas Raymond
- Mason Raymond
- Paul "Marcel" Raymond
- Chuck Rayner

== Re ==
- Matt Read
- Melvin Read
- Ryan Ready
- Ken Reardon
- Terry Reardon
- Marty Reasoner
- Daryl Reaugh
- Marc Reaume
- Ryan Reaves
- Billy Reay
- Mark Recchi
- Joel Rechlicz
- Gord Redahl
- Wade Redden
- Eldon "Pokey" Reddick
- George Redding
- Liam Reddox
- Craig Redmond
- Dick Redmond
- Keith Redmond
- Mickey Redmond
- Zach Redmond
- Greg Redquest
- Dave Reece
- Mark Reeds
- Scott Reedy
- Joe Reekie
- Dylan Reese
- Jeff Reese
- Bill Regan
- Larry Regan
- Richie Regehr
- Robyn Regehr
- Pavol Regenda
- Darcy Regier
- Steve Regier
- Peter Regin
- Brent Regner
- Earl Reibel
- Jeremy Reich
- Kristian Reichel
- Lukas Reichel
- Robert Reichel
- Craig Reichert
- Brandon Reid
- Darren Reid
- Dave Reid (born 1934)
- Dave Reid (born 1964)
- Gerry Reid
- Gordon Reid
- Reg Reid
- Tom Reid
- Dave Reierson
- Ed Reigle
- Mike Reilly
- James Reimer
- Cole Reinhardt
- Griffin Reinhart
- Max Reinhart
- Paul Reinhart
- Sam Reinhart
- Ollie Reinikka
- Mitch Reinke
- Steven Reinprecht
- Todd Reirden
- Leo Reise
- Leo Reise Jr.
- Eric Reitz
- Sheldon Rempal
- Matt Rempe
- Mark Renaud
- Mikael Renberg
- Borna Rendulic
- Dan Renouf
- Michal Repik
- Glenn "Chico" Resch
- Tarmo Reunanen
- Bobby Reynolds

== Rh–Ri ==
- Jon Rheault
- Herb Rheaume
- Pascal Rheaume
- Damian Rhodes
- Pat Ribble
- Mike Ribeiro
- Mike Ricci
- Nick Ricci
- Steven Rice
- Anthony Richard
- Henri Richard
- Jacques Richard
- Jean-Marc Richard
- Maurice "Rocket" Richard
- Mike Richard
- Tanner Richard
- Brad Richards
- Mike Richards
- Todd Richards
- Travis Richards
- Brad Richardson
- Dave Richardson
- Glen Richardson
- Ken Richardson
- Luke Richardson
- Terry Richardson
- Bob Richer
- Stephane Richer (defenceman)
- Stephane Richer (forward)
- Danny Richmond
- Steve Richmond
- Barry Richter
- Dave Richter
- Mike Richter
- Curt Ridley
- Mike Ridley
- Tobias Rieder
- Morgan Rielly
- Vincent Riendeau
- Michel Riesen
- Marshall Rifai
- Dennis Riggin
- Pat Riggin
- Juuso Riikola
- Bill Riley
- Jack Riley
- James Riley
- Zac Rinaldo
- Bob Ring
- Pekka Rinne
- Howard Riopelle
- Gerry Rioux
- Pierre Rioux
- Vic Ripley
- Doug Risebrough
- Rasmus Rissanen
- Gary Rissling
- Patrick Rissmiller
- Rasmus Ristolainen
- Jani Rita
- Bob Ritchie
- Brett Ritchie
- Byron Ritchie
- Dave Ritchie
- Nick Ritchie
- Mattias Ritola
- Alex Ritson
- David Rittich
- Al Rittinger
- Bobby Rivard
- Fern Rivard
- Gus Rivers
- Jamie Rivers
- Shawn Rivers
- Wayne Rivers
- Craig Rivet
- Garth Rizzuto

== Ro ==
- Andy Roach
- John Roach
- Mickey Roach
- Colby Robak
- Mario Roberge
- Serge Roberge
- Claude Robert
- Rene Robert
- Phil Roberto
- David Roberts
- Doug Roberts
- Gary Roberts
- Gordie Roberts
- Jim Roberts (born 1940)
- Jim Roberts (born 1956)
- Moe Roberts
- Earl Robertson
- Fred Robertson
- Geordie Robertson
- George Robertson
- Jason Robertson
- Nicholas Robertson
- Torrie Robertson
- Bert Robertsson
- Stephane Robidas
- Florent Robidoux
- Bobby Robins
- Tristen Robins
- Charles "Buddy" Robinson
- Doug Robinson
- Earl Robinson
- Eric Robinson
- Larry Robinson
- Moe Robinson
- Nathan Robinson
- Rob Robinson
- Scott Robinson
- Louis Robitaille
- Luc Robitaille
- Mike Robitaille
- Randy Robitaille
- Dave Roche
- Desse Roche
- Earl Roche
- Ernie Roche
- Travis Roche
- Dave Rochefort
- Leon Rochefort
- Normand Rochefort
- Harvey Rockburn
- Eddie Rodden
- Jack Rodewald
- Marc Rodgers
- Anton Rodin
- Bryan Rodney
- Evan Rodrigues
- Jeremy Roenick
- Stacy Roest
- John Rogers
- Mike Rogers
- Jeff Rohlicek
- Leif Rohlin
- Jon Rohloff
- Todd Rohloff
- Dale Rolfe
- Al Rollins
- Dwayne Roloson
- Brian Rolston
- Larry Romanchych
- Russ Romaniuk
- Roberto Romano
- Alexander Romanov
- Georgi Romanov
- Doug Rombough
- Aaron Rome
- Dale Rominski
- Elwin "Doc" Romnes
- Ed Ronan
- Skene Ronan
- Jonas Rondbjerg
- Cliff Ronning
- Jonas Ronnqvist
- Len Ronson
- Paul Ronty
- Kevin Rooney
- Steve Rooney
- Filip Roos
- Bill Root
- Pavel Rosa
- Mike Rosati
- Jay Rosehill
- Calle Rosen
- Isak Rosen
- Jack Roslovic
- Art Ross
- Jared Ross
- Jim Ross
- Marco Rossi
- Felix "Rollie" Rossignol
- Kyle Rossiter
- Darcy Rota
- Randy Rota
- Sammy Rothschild
- Orville "Rolly" Roulston
- Tom Roulston
- Magnus Roupe
- Allan Rourke
- Bob Rouse
- Lukas Rousek
- Bobby Rousseau
- Guy Rousseau
- Rollie Rousseau
- Antoine Roussel
- Dominic Roussel
- Jean-Marc Routhier
- Bobby Rowe
- Mike Rowe
- Ronnie Rowe
- Tom Rowe
- Carter Rowney
- Andre Roy
- Derek Roy
- Jean-Yves Roy
- Joshua Roy
- Kevin Roy
- Matt Roy
- Mathieu Roy
- Nicolas Roy
- Patrick Roy
- Stephane Roy (born 1967)
- Stephane Roy (born 1976)
- Gaetan Royer
- Remi Royer
- Michal Rozsival
- Gino Rozzini

== Ru–Ry ==
- Kristians Rubins
- German Rubtsov
- Steve Rucchin
- Mike Rucinski (born 1963)
- Mike Rucinski (born 1975)
- Martin Rucinsky
- Cody Rudkowsky
- Bernie Ruelle
- Jason Ruff
- Lindy Ruff
- Kent Ruhnke
- Darren Rumble
- David Rundblad
- Thomas Rundqvist
- Paul Runge
- Arttu Ruotsalainen
- Reijo Ruotsalainen
- Duane Rupp
- Michael Rupp
- Pat Rupp
- Terry Ruskowski
- Cam Russell
- Church Russell
- Kris Russell
- Patrick Russell
- Phil Russell
- Ryan Russell
- Robbie Russo
- Bryan Rust
- Jim Rutherford
- Wayne Rutledge
- Jan Rutta
- Christian Ruuttu
- Jarkko Ruutu
- Tuomo Ruutu
- Stefan Ruzicka
- Vladimir Ruzicka
- Bobby Ryan
- Derek Ryan
- Joakim Ryan
- Matt Ryan
- Michael Ryan
- Prestin Ryan
- Terry Ryan
- Kerby Rychel
- Warren Rychel
- Mark Rycroft
- Michael Ryder
- Andy Rymsha
- Jussi Rynnas
- Rick Rypien
- Jason Ryznar

== See also ==
- hockeydb.com NHL Player List - R
