= Maurice Croghan =

Canadian ice hockey player

- Born: November 19, 1914; Montreal, Quebec, Canada
- Died: February 7, 1979 (aged 64)
- Height: 5 ft 11 in (180 cm)
- Weight: 185 lb (84 kg; 13 st 3 lb)
- Position: Defence
- Shot: Left
- Played for: Montreal Maroons
- Playing career: 1934–1941

Moses Thomas "Moe" Croghan (November 19, 1914 — February 7, 1979) was a Canadian professional ice hockey player who played 16 games in the National Hockey League with the Montreal Maroons during the 1937–38 season. The rest of his career, which lasted from 1934 to 1941, was spent in senior and minor leagues. Croghan was born in Montreal, Quebec.

== Career statistics ==
=== Regular season and playoffs ===
			Regular season					Playoffs
Season	Team	League	GP	G	A	Pts	PIM	GP	G	A	Pts	PIM
1933–34	Montreal Junior Royals	QJAAH	6	2	1	3	14	4	3	0	3	19
1934–35	Verdun Maple Leafs	QJAHA	6	1	0	1	6	6	3	1	4	6
1934–35	Montreal Royals	MTL Sr	20	2	0	2	14	7	0	2	2	6
1935–36	Verdun Maple Leafs	QJAHA	4	0	4	4	0	2	2	0	2	4
1935–36	Verdun Maple Leafs	MTL Sr	1	0	0	0	0	7	0	0	0	0
1936–37	Quebec Aces	QSHL	24	1	9	10	34	6	1	2	3	2
1936–37	Quebec Aces	Al-Cup	—	—	—	—	—	5	1	3	4	6
1937–38	Montreal Maroons	NHL	16	0	0	0	4	—	—	—	—	—
1937–38	Montreal Royals	MCHL	1	0	0	0	0	—	—	—	—	—
1938–39	Providence Reds	IAHL	13	0	1	1	6	—	—	—	—	—
1938–39	Springfield Indians	IAHL	16	0	1	1	10	3	0	0	0	0
1939–40	Montreal Victorias	MCHL	11	0	1	1	4	—	—	—	—	—
1940–41	Montreal Royals	MCHL	20	1	1	2	27	—	—	—	—	—
NHL totals			16	0	0	0	4	—	—	—	—	—
