= Fabian Brunnström =

Swedish ice hockey player (born 1985)

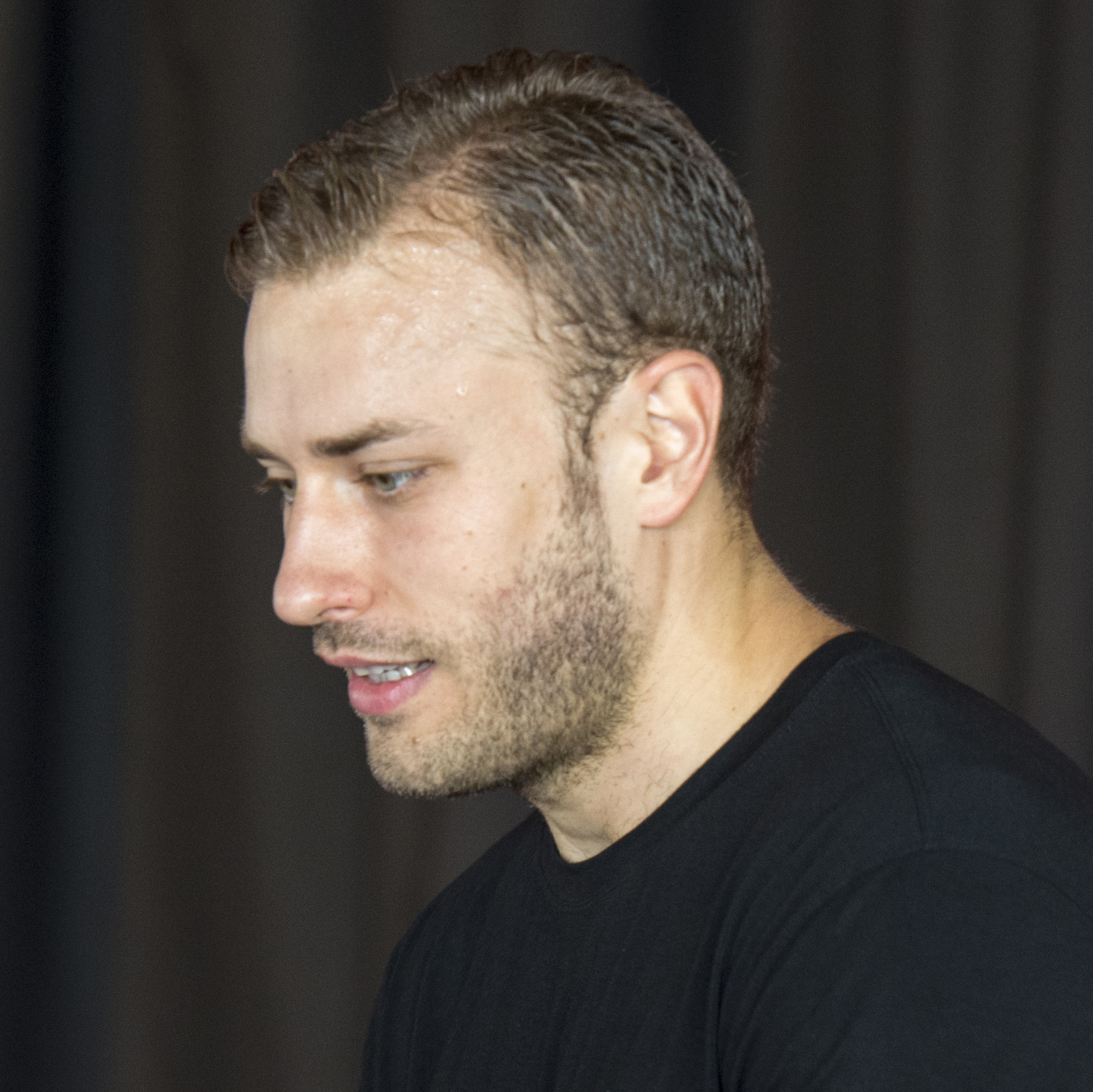
- Brunnström in August 2013
- Born: 6 February 1985 (age 41) Helsingborg, Sweden
- Height: 6 ft 1 in (185 cm)
- Weight: 206 lb (93 kg; 14 st 10 lb)
- Position: Left wing
- Shot: Left
- Played for: Färjestads BK; Dallas Stars; Detroit Red Wings; Frölunda HC; Leksands IF; Rungsted Seier Capital
- National team: Sweden
- NHL draft: Undrafted
- Playing career: 2005–2017

Fabian Brunnström (born 6 February 1985) is a Swedish former professional ice hockey forward. He played in the National Hockey League (NHL) with the Dallas Stars and Detroit Red Wings.

== Playing career ==
Brunnström began playing professionally in Sweden's third highest hockey league with Jonstorps IF from 2005 to 2006, scoring 44 points in 38 games. The following year, he joined Borås HC, helping their promotion to the second-tier Allsvenskan with a league-leading 73 points in 41 games.

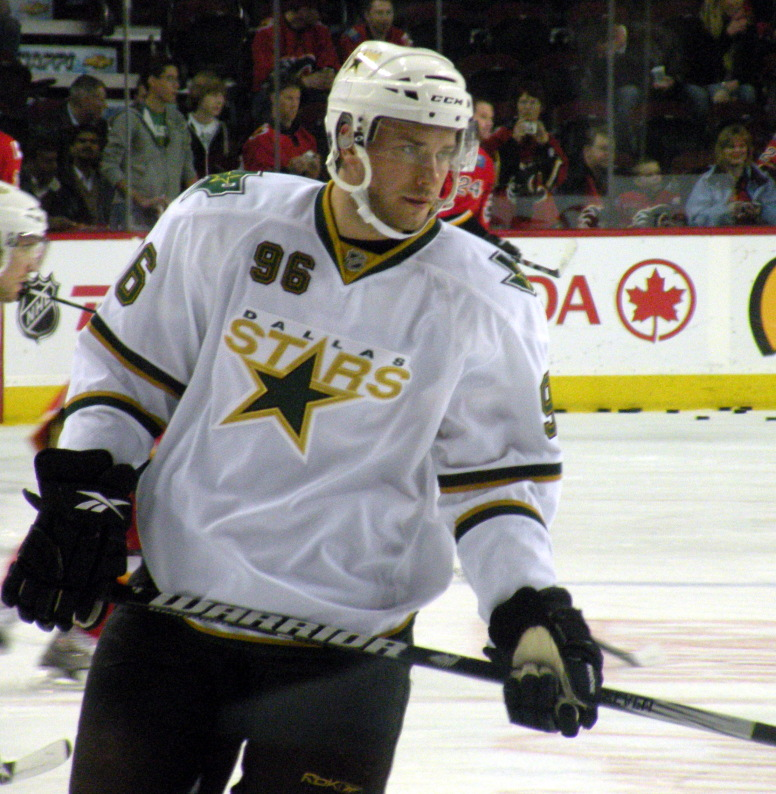
Fabian Brunnström in March 2009.

In 2007–08, Brunnström began garnering attention from the NHL while playing in the top-tier Elitserien with Färjestads BK. Undrafted by an NHL club, he was an unrestricted free agent in the NHL. Negotiations with Brunnström came to a head towards the end of the season, with the Detroit Red Wings, Montreal Canadiens, Toronto Maple Leafs and Vancouver Canucks widely considered to be the initial front-runners in landing him. Canucks general manager Dave Nonis was reportedly close to signing Brunnström, but was fired before the deal could take place.

After completing the season with 37 points in 54 games, Brunnström eventually signed with the Dallas Stars on 8 May 2008 to a two-year entry-level contract. The deal was reportedly close to US$850,000 annually with bonus incentives that could increase his salary to US$2.5 million.

After being a healthy scratch in his first two games with the Stars, Brunnström became the third player in NHL history to score a hat trick in his debut game on 15 October 2008, joining Alex Smart of the Montreal Canadiens (14 January 1943) and Réal Cloutier of the Quebec Nordiques (10 October 1979), and later joined by Derek Stepan of the New York Rangers (9 October 2010), Auston Matthews (who scored four) of the Toronto Maple Leafs (12 October 2016) and Ryan Poehling of the Montreal Canadiens (6 April 2019). Brunnström was credited with the game-winning goal, helping the Stars to a 6-4 win over the Nashville Predators. He also scored a fourth goal in his debut game which was disallowed.

Brunnström was placed on waivers by Dallas on 15 October 2010. He was assigned to the Stars' American Hockey League (AHL) affiliate, the Texas Stars on 18 October, after he cleared waivers.

On 13 January 2011, Brunnström was traded to the Toronto Maple Leafs in exchange for Mikhail Stefanovich.

On 17 August 2011, the Detroit Red Wings signed Brunnström to a pro tryout contract. Making the Red Wings' 2011–12 starting roster, on 3 October 2011, Detroit signed Brunnström to a one-year two-way contract which assured him $105,000 in AHL and $600,000 at the NHL level. He was, however, a healthy scratch for all but one of the Red Wings' first nine games, and on 30 October 2011 was placed on waivers.

In 2012, he signed with Frölunda HC of the Swedish Hockey League (SHL), during the 2013–14 season, he transferred to fellow SHL side Leksands IF. After a short stint with the Malmö Redhawks and after sitting out the 2015–16 season, he re-signed with the Redhawks on 1 June 2016.

After a year’s hiatus, Brunnström returned to the professional circuit for one last season in 2016–17, playing with Rungsted Seier Capital in the Danish Metal Ligaen. He scored 25 points in 37 games, before injury ended his season. He announced his retirement after helping Seier Capital claim the Danish championship.

== Career statistics ==
			Regular season					Playoffs
Season	Team	League	GP	G	A	Pts	PIM	GP	G	A	Pts	PIM
2005–06	Jonstorps IF	Div.1	38	21	23	44	8	—	—	—	—	—
2005–06	Rögle BK	Allsv	3	0	0	0	2	—	—	—	—	—
2006–07	Borås HC	Div.1	41	37	36	73	28	8	1	5	6	4
2007–08	Färjestads BK	SEL	54	9	28	37	16	12	1	0	1	6
2008–09	Dallas Stars	NHL	55	17	12	29	8	—	—	—	—	—
2008–09	Manitoba Moose	AHL	1	0	0	0	0	—	—	—	—	—
2009–10	Dallas Stars	NHL	44	2	9	11	10	—	—	—	—	—
2009–10	Texas Stars	AHL	8	1	4	5	2	—	—	—	—	—
2010–11	Texas Stars	AHL	37	11	10	21	16	—	—	—	—	—
2010–11	Toronto Marlies	AHL	35	4	10	14	4	—	—	—	—	—
2011–12	Detroit Red Wings	NHL	5	0	1	1	4	—	—	—	—	—
2011–12	Grand Rapids Griffins	AHL	45	12	23	35	41	—	—	—	—	—
2012–13	Frölunda HC	SEL	51	9	9	18	24	6	1	1	2	2
2013–14	Frölunda HC	SHL	4	0	2	2	2	—	—	—	—	—
2013–14	Leksands IF	SHL	46	9	7	16	18	2	0	0	0	0
2014–15	Leksands IF	SHL	38	8	10	18	16	—	—	—	—	—
2014–15	Malmö Redhawks	Allsv	8	2	6	8	4	12	1	4	5	4
2016–17	Rungsted Seier Capital	DEN	37	9	16	25	12	—	—	—	—	—
SHL totals			193	35	56	91	76	20	2	1	3	8
NHL totals			104	19	22	41	22	—	—	—	—	—
