= Ernie Laforce =

Canadian ice hockey defenceman (1916 - 2009)

- Laforce, 1947 Montreal Royals
- Born: June 23, 1916; Montreal, Quebec, Canada
- Died: October 18, 2009 (aged 93); Russell, Ontario, Canada
- Height: 5 ft 11 in (180 cm)
- Weight: 175 lb (79 kg; 12 st 7 lb)
- Position: Defence
- Shot: Left
- Played for: Montreal Canadiens
- Playing career: 1937–1951

Joseph Herve Jean Ernest Laforce (June 23, 1916 – October 18, 2009) was a Canadian ice hockey defenceman. He played one game in the National Hockey League with the Montreal Canadiens during the 1942–43 season. The rest of his career, which lasted from 1937 to 1951, was mainly spent in the Quebec Senior Hockey League.

== Career ==
=== Juniors ===
Laforce played for the Verdun Maple Leafs and the Montreal St. Pats of the Montreal City Hockey League before playing in the NHL.

=== NHL ===
Laforce played one game as a member of the Montreal Canadiens during the 1942–43 season, on March 6, 1943 against the Toronto Maple Leafs. He was signed to the team as an injury replacement. He wore jersey #14

=== QSHL ===
Laforce went on to play six seasons as a member of the Montreal Royals, a team that played in the Quebec Senior Hockey League where he was known as one of the best playmaking defencemen in the league. before retiring in 1951.

== Personal ==
Laforce died in St. Albert, Ontario on October 18, 2009. He was 93 years old.

== Career statistics ==
=== Regular season and playoffs ===
			Regular season					Playoffs
Season	Team	League	GP	G	A	Pts	PIM	GP	G	A	Pts	PIM
1937–38	Montreal LaFontaine Bleus	QPHL	3	0	0	0	2	—	—	—	—	—
1938–39	Verdun Maple Leafs	QSHL	18	4	4	8	14	2	0	0	0	4
1939–40	Verdun Bulldogs	QPHL	38	10	20	30	24	2	0	0	0	0
1940–41	Verdun Maple Leafs	QSHL	34	6	9	15	23	—	—	—	—	—
1941–42	Montreal St. Pats	MCHL	37	5	15	20	12	—	—	—	—	—
1942–43	Montreal Canadiens	NHL	1	0	0	0	0	—	—	—	—	—
1942–43	Montreal Royals	QSHL	32	1	15	16	18	4	0	2	2	0
1943–44	Montreal Canada Car	MCHL	7	3	3	6	2	—	—	—	—	—
1943–44	Montreal Royals	QSHL	19	1	15	16	6	7	0	1	1	8
1944–45	Montreal Royals	QSHL	22	7	13	20	19	7	0	3	3	2
1945–46	Montreal Royals	QSHL	24	9	7	16	4	6	0	1	1	6
1946–47	Montreal Royals	QSHL	21	3	6	9	18	11	1	7	8	10
1946–47	Montreal Royals	Al-Cup	—	—	—	—	—	14	2	3	5	4
1947–48	Montreal Royals	QSHL	44	6	20	26	16	3	0	0	0	0
1948–49	Montreal Royals	QSHL	58	2	18	20	20	9	3	4	7	8
1949–50	Montreal Royals	QSHL	52	2	14	16	31	6	0	0	0	2
1950–51	Joliette Cyclones	QPHL	—	—	—	—	—	—	—	—	—	—
QSHL totals			324	41	121	162	169	55	4	18	22	40
NHL totals			1	0	0	0	0	—	—	—	—	—

== See also ==
- List of players who played only one game in the NHL
