= Rathwell =

Rathwell may refer to:

- Rathwell, Manitoba, unincorporated urban centre
- Jake Rathwell (born 1947), Canadian ice hockey player
