= Fortier =

Fortier may refer to:

== People with the surname ==
- Alcée Fortier, professor of language and folklore, New Orleans
- Charles Fortier, hockey player
- Chris Fortier, DJ
- Claude Fortier, physiologist
- Donald Fortier, member of U.S. intelligence community
- Drew Fortier, musician, songwriter, filmmaker, author, and actor
- François-Edmond Fortier (1862–1928), French photographer
- Lisa Fortier (born 1981), American basketball coach
- Marc Fortier, Canadian hockey player
- Mary Fortier, American politician from Connecticut
- Michael Fortier, Canadian politician
- Michael Fortier (American), accomplice in Oklahoma City bombing
- Moïse Fortier, Quebec politician
- Robert Fortier, American actor
- Sylvie Fortier (born 1958), Canadian former synchronized swimming
- Yves Fortier (geologist), former head of the Geological Survey of Canada
- Yves Fortier (lawyer), Canadian diplomat, lawyer and business executive

== Toponyms ==
- Fortier Township, Yellow Medicine County, Minnesota, United States
- Fortier River (disambiguation)

== Other uses ==
- Fortier (TV series), a Québécois television drama series
