= Alex Smart =

Canadian ice hockey player (1918–2005)

- Born: May 29, 1918 Brandon, Manitoba, Canada
- Died: April 18, 2005 (aged 86) Ottawa, Ontario, Canada
- Height: 5 ft 10 in (178 cm)
- Weight: 150 lb (68 kg; 10 st 10 lb)
- Position: Left wing
- Shot: Left
- Played for: Montreal Canadiens
- Playing career: 1938–1953

Alexander Smart (May 29, 1918 – April 18, 2005) was a Canadian ice hockey forward. He played 8 games in the National Hockey League (NHL) for the Montreal Canadiens during the 1942–43 season. The rest of his career, which lasted from 1938 to 1950, was mainly spent in the Quebec Senior Hockey League.

== Playing career ==
Born in Brandon, Manitoba, Smart played junior hockey in the Manitoba Junior Hockey League with the Portage Terriers for two seasons. In 1937–38, joined the senior ranks with the Toronto Marlboros of the Ontario Hockey Association and scored 23 points in 12 games at a goal-per-game pace. The following season, he began a three-year stint in the Montreal City Hockey League (MCHL) with the Verdun Maple Leafs and Montreal Sr. Canadiens.

In 1941–42, Smart moved with the Sr. Canadiens to the Quebec Senior Hockey League (QSHL). Affiliated with the Montreal Canadiens of the National Hockey League, Smart was called up to the NHL in January of the 1942–43 NHL season and, on January 14, became the first player in league history to score a hat trick in his NHL debut; this feat would not be matched for 36 years, by Réal Cloutier at the start of the 1979–80 NHL season, and since repeated by only Fabian Brunnström (2008), Derek Stepan (2010), Ryan Poehling (2019), and not exceeded until Auston Matthews (2016), who scored four. He completed the season with 5 goals and 2 assists in 8 games – the lone NHL stint of his career.

Smart spent the remainder of his career in the QSHL with the Montreal Royals and Ottawa Senators except for one more season in the MCHL with the Montreal Vickers and the final season of his career in the OVHL with Eastview St. Charles. He recorded a career-high 66 points in 47 games with the Senators in 1947–48, then helped the club to an Allan Cup in 1949 as Canada's senior amateur champions. Smart retired after the 1950–51 season, spent with Eastview.

== Post-playing career ==
After retiring from the QSHL, Smart became a scout for the Los Angeles Kings and worked with Goodyear Tire for forty years.

== Career statistics ==
=== Regular season and playoffs ===
			Regular season					Playoffs
Season	Team	League	GP	G	A	Pts	PIM	GP	G	A	Pts	PIM
1935–36	Portage Terriers	MJHL	16	10	4	14	4	6	9	6	15	2
1936–37	Portage Terriers	MJHL	16	15	4	19	10	4	0	2	2	6
1937–38	Toronto Marlboros	OHA	12	12	11	23	10	6	4	8	12	9
1938–39	Verdun Maple Leafs	QSHL	22	6	9	15	18	2	1	1	2	4
1939–40	Verdun Maple Leafs	QSHL	21	8	9	17	13	8	7	1	8	9
1940–41	Montreal Senior Canadiens	MCHL	33	7	15	22	21	—	—	—	—	—
1941–42	Montreal Senior Canadiens	QSHL	36	15	6	21	40	6	4	4	8	4
1942–43	Montreal Canadiens	NHL	8	5	2	7	0	—	—	—	—	—
1942–43	Montreal Senior Canadiens	QSHL	23	12	11	23	8	—	—	—	—	—
1943–44	Montreal Royals	QSHL	20	9	14	23	9	5	4	3	7	2
1944–45	Montreal Royals	QSHL	24	19	19	38	12	7	2	3	5	2
1945–46	Montreal Royals	QSHL	37	16	24	40	33	11	5	5	10	6
1946–47	Ottawa Senators	QSHL	38	14	21	35	26	9	1	6	7	4
1947–48	Ottawa Senators	QSHL	47	28	38	66	11	12	2	8	10	6
1947–48	Ottawa Senators	Al-Cup	—	—	—	—	—	10	4	7	11	2
1948–49	Ottawa Senators	QSHL	40	14	27	41	29	11	3	4	7	6
1948–49	Ottawa Senators	Al-Cup	—	—	—	—	—	14	1	4	5	2
1949–50	Ottawa Senators	QSHL	28	8	12	20	28	7	0	3	3	12
QSHL totals			336	149	190	339	227	78	29	38	67	55
NHL totals			8	5	2	7	0	—	—	—	—	—
