= Moe White =

Canadian ice hockey player

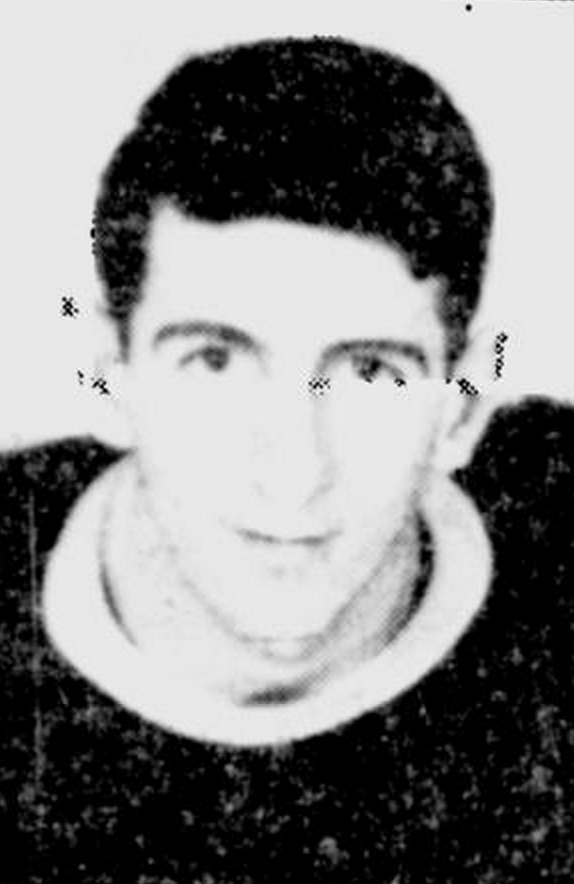
- Born: July 28, 1919; Verdun, Quebec, Canada
- Died: February 15, 2003 (aged 83); Montreal, Quebec, Canada
- Height: 5 ft 11 in (180 cm)
- Weight: 178 lb (81 kg; 12 st 10 lb)
- Position: Left wing/Centre
- Shot: Left
- Played for: Montreal Canadiens
- Playing career: 1938–1952

Leonard Arthur "Moe" White (July 28, 1919 – February 15, 2003) was a Canadian ice hockey forward. He played four games in the National Hockey League for the Montreal Canadiens during the 1945–46 season. The rest of his career, which lasted from 1938 to 1952, was spent in the minor leagues. He was born in Verdun, Quebec.

He died in Montreal in 2003.

== Career statistics ==
=== Regular season and playoffs ===
			Regular season					Playoffs
Season	Team	League	GP	G	A	Pts	PIM	GP	G	A	Pts	PIM
1935–36	Verdun Maple Leafs	QJAHA	9	1	3	4	0	2	0	2	2	0
1936–37	Montreal Victorias	MCJHL	11	2	5	7	19	2	2	1	3	2
1936–37	Montreal Victorias	M-Cup	—	—	—	—	—	4	2	2	4	2
1937–38	Montreal Victorias	MCJHL	19	7	5	12	19	6	6	2	8	16
1937–38	Montreal Victorias	M-Cup	—	—	—	—	—	4	2	2	4	2
1938–39	Montreal Victorias	MCHL	22	9	10	19	19	—	—	—	—	—
1939–40	Verdun Maple Leafs	QSHL	30	14	14	28	20	8	3	3	6	10
1940–41	Glace Bay Miners	CBSHL	11	4	5	9	14	—	—	—	—	—
1941–42	Glace Bay Miners	CBSHL	40	31	31	62	44	7	5	4	9	6
1942–43	Montreal Army	MCHL	6	6	7	13	2	5	6	4	10	0
1942–43	Montreal Army	QSHL	33	13	20	33	16	7	1	2	3	16
1943–44	Montreal Army	MCHL	1	0	0	0	0	—	—	—	—	—
1943–44	Kingston Army	OHA Sr	13	7	8	15	6	—	—	—	—	—
1945–46	Montreal Canadiens	NHL	4	0	1	1	2	—	—	—	—	—
1945–46	Montreal Royals	QSHL	1	1	0	1	2	—	—	—	—	—
1945–46	Buffalo Bisons	AHL	11	2	2	4	2	—	—	—	—	—
1946–47	Houston Huskies	USHL	60	28	34	62	27	—	—	—	—	—
1947–48	Valleyfield Braves	QSHL	46	23	29	52	37	6	0	2	2	10
1948–49	Glace Bay Miners	CBSHL	57	6	44	50	111	12	1	3	4	33
1949–50	Glace Bay Miners	CBSHL	70	18	27	45	33	10	0	9	9	2
1950–51	Joliette Cyclones	QPHL	—	—	—	—	—	—	—	—	—	—
1951–52	St-Laurent Castors	QPHL	—	—	—	—	—	—	—	—	—	—
CBSHL totals			178	59	107	166	202	29	6	16	22	41
QSHL totals			110	51	63	114	75	21	4	7	11	36
NHL totals			4	0	1	1	2	—	—	—	—	—
