= Peter Folco =

Canadian ice hockey player

- Born: August 13, 1953 (age 71); Montreal, Quebec, Canada
- Height: 6 ft 0 in (183 cm)
- Weight: 185 lb (84 kg; 13 st 3 lb)
- Position: Defence
- Shot: Left
- Played for: Birmingham Bulls Toronto Toros; Vancouver Canucks
- NHL draft: 131st overall, 1973; Vancouver Canucks
- Playing career: 1973–1977

Peter Folco (born August 13, 1953) is a Canadian former professional ice hockey player who played for the Vancouver Canucks of the National Hockey League and the Toronto Toros and Birmingham Bulls of the World Hockey Association between 1974 and 1977.

Folco was born in Montreal, Quebec. As a youth, he played in the 1966 Quebec International Pee-Wee Hockey Tournament with a minor ice hockey team from Verdun, Quebec.

== Career statistics ==
=== Regular season and playoffs ===
			Regular season					Playoffs
Season	Team	League	GP	G	A	Pts	PIM	GP	G	A	Pts	PIM
1969–70	Verdun Maple Leafs	QMJHL	43	1	7	8	24	—	—	—	—	—
1970–71	Verdun Maple Leafs	QMJHL	54	8	20	28	22	5	0	1	1	2
1971–72	Verdun Maple Leafs	QMJHL	40	7	16	23	59	—	—	—	—	—
1972–73	Quebec Remparts	QMJHL	55	8	47	55	26	—	—	—	—	—
1972–73	Quebec Remparts	M-Cup	—	—	—	—	—	2	0	0	0	2
1973–74	Seattle Totems	WHL	69	3	26	29	57	—	—	—	—	—
1973–74	Vancouver Canucks	NHL	2	0	0	0	0	—	—	—	—	—
1974–75	Seattle Totems	CHL	59	4	19	23	101	—	—	—	—	—
1975–76	Beauce Jaros	NAHL	51	8	51	59	84	6	0	4	4	4
1975–76	Toronto Toros	WHA	19	1	8	9	15	—	—	—	—	—
1976–77	Beauce Jaros	NAHL	19	5	12	17	28	—	—	—	—	—
1976–77	Philadelphia Firebirds	NAHL	41	0	25	25	28	4	1	1	2	2
1976–77	Birmingham Bulls	WHA	2	0	0	0	0	—	—	—	—	—
WHA totals			21	1	8	9	15	—	—	—	—	—
NHL totals			2	0	0	0	0	—	—	—	—	—
