= Norm Burns =

Canadian ice hockey player

- Born: February 20, 1918; Youngstown, Alberta, Canada
- Died: February 23, 1995 (aged 77)
- Height: 6 ft 0 in (183 cm)
- Weight: 187 lb (85 kg; 13 st 5 lb)
- Position: Centre
- Shot: Right
- Played for: New York Rangers
- Playing career: 1938–1949

Norman Carlyle Burns (February 20, 1918 – February 23, 1995) was a Canadian ice hockey centre. He played 11 games in the National Hockey League for the New York Rangers during the 1941–42 season. The rest of his career, which lasted from 1939 to 1949, was spent in the minor leagues. Burns was born in Youngstown, Alberta.

== Career statistics ==
=== Regular season and playoffs ===
			Regular season					Playoffs
Season	Team	League	GP	G	A	Pts	PIM	GP	G	A	Pts	PIM
1938–39	Sherbrooke Red Raiders	QPHL	—	—	—	—	—	—	—	—	—	—
1939–40	Atlantic City Sea Gulls	EAHL	49	22	28	50	14	—	—	—	—	—
1939–40	Rivervale Skeeters	EAHL	14	10	8	18	0	—	—	—	—	—
1940–41	Washington Eagles	EAHL	64	67	26	93	35	2	3	0	3	4
1941–42	New York Rangers	NHL	11	0	4	4	3	—	—	—	—	—
1941–42	New Haven Eagles	AHL	35	27	32	59	13	2	0	0	0	0
1942–43	Montreal RCAF	QSHL	25	12	14	26	10	9	2	1	3	6
1943–44	Toronto RCAF	OHA Sr	11	3	5	8	4	—	—	—	—	—
1943–44	Toronto Fuels	TMHL	9	11	11	22	0	4	10	7	17	0
1945–46	St. Paul Saints	USHL	54	30	22	52	28	5	0	0	0	0
1946–47	New Haven Ramblers	AHL	29	21	21	42	6	—	—	—	—	—
1946–47	Cleveland Barons	AHL	13	2	2	4	4	4	0	0	0	)
1947–48	Minneapolis Millers	USHL	57	23	27	50	8	10	1	2	3	0
1948–49	Springfield Indians	AHL	21	2	13	15	4	—	—	—	—	—
1948–49	Washington Lions	AHL	18	3	8	11	0	—	—	—	—	—
NHL totals			11	0	4	4	2	—	—	—	—	—
