= Melvin Read =

Canadian ice hockey player (1922–2005)

- Born: April 10, 1922 Montreal, Quebec, Canada
- Died: July 9, 2005 (aged 83)
- Height: 5 ft 8 in (173 cm)
- Weight: 165 lb (75 kg; 11 st 11 lb)
- Position: Centre
- Shot: Left
- Played for: New York Rangers
- Playing career: 1941–1952

Melvin Dean "Mel, Pee Wee" Read (April 10, 1922 – July 9, 2005) was a Canadian professional ice hockey centre. He played six games in the National Hockey League with the New York Rangers during the 1946–47 season. The rest of his career, which lasted from 1941 to 1952, was spent in the minor leagues.

== Career statistics ==
=== Regular season and playoffs ===
			Regular season					Playoffs
Season	Team	League	GP	G	A	Pts	PIM	GP	G	A	Pts	PIM
1940–41	Verdun Red Devils	QJAHA	12	7	8	15	2	2	0	0	0	0
1940–41	Verdun Maple Leafs	QSHL	1	0	0	0	0	—	—	—	—	—
1941–42	Cornwall Flyers	QSHL	40	11	10	21	14	5	0	0	0	4
1942–43	Montreal Senior Canadiens	QSHL	22	7	7	14	4	—	—	—	—	—
1943–44	Montreal Navy	MCHL	11	12	13	25	4	6	7	3	10	4
1944–45	Montreal Royals	QSHL	12	4	3	7	9	3	0	1	1	0
1945–46	Dallas Texans	USHL	56	39	53	92	28	—	—	—	—	—
1946–47	New York Rangers	NHL	6	0	0	0	8	—	—	—	—	—
1946–47	New Haven Ramblers	AHL	59	13	27	40	42	3	1	2	3	2
1947–48	St. Paul Saints	USHL	62	19	30	49	36	—	—	—	—	—
1948–49	Tacoma Rockets	PCHL	70	27	43	70	41	6	2	5	7	0
1948–49	Shawinigan Falls Cataractes	QSHL	1	0	1	1	0	—	—	—	—	—
1949–50	Tacoma Rockets	PCHL	70	20	67	87	23	5	3	3	6	0
1950–51	Tacoma Rockets	PCHL	70	22	42	64	18	6	1	2	3	2
1951–52	Shawinigan Falls Cataractes	QSHL	58	7	23	30	8	—	—	—	—	—
PCHL totals			210	69	152	221	82	17	6	10	16	2
NHL totals			6	0	0	0	8	—	—	—	—	—
