= Charles Fortier =

Canadian ice hockey player

- Born: August 4, 1892 Rockland, Ontario, Canada
- Position: Left wing

Charles Auguste Fortier (born August 4, 1892 in Rockland, Ontario) was a Canadian hockey left wing who signed a contract with the Montreal Canadiens of the National Hockey League during the training camp prior to the 1923-24 season but then opted to remain an amateur, and thus never played in the NHL.

== Playing career ==
Fortier played in the Lower Ottawa Valley Hockey Association, the Ottawa City Hockey League (at the senior level) and the Hull-Ottawa Senior Hockey League.

Prior to the 1923-24 season, he participated in the Montreal Canadiens training camp in Grimsby, Ontario, where he was one of three rookies (the others were Howie Morenz and Sylvio Mantha) who signed a contract for the upcoming season. However, just prior to the beginning of the season, which took place in Toronto against the St. Patricks on December 15, he changed his mind and returned to Ottawa.

Fortier was long believed to have played that first game of the season in Toronto, leading to his being credited with having played one NHL game in his career. However, research done in the late 1990s showed that Fortier had not played that game. The 1998-99 edition of the NHL Official Guide & Record Book was the last to list him as a former NHL player, whereas his name was removed from the Montreal Canadiens' media guides following the 2008-09 season.
