= Fortier River =

Fortier River may refer to:

- Fortier River (Bécancour River tributary)
- Fortier River (Panache River tributary)
- Fortier River, a tributary of the Gatineau River in Quebec, Canada

== See also ==
- Fortier (disambiguation)
