= Ken McKenzie =

Canadian newspaper publisher (1923–2003)

- Born: August 19, 1923; Winnipeg, Manitoba, Canada
- Died: April 9, 2003 (aged 79); Mississauga, Ontario, Canada
- Occupations: Newspaper publisher, sports journalist
- Known for: National Hockey League publicity director
- Notable work: The Hockey News
- Awards: Manitoba Sports Hall of Fame; Manitoba Hockey Hall of Fame; Elmer Ferguson Memorial Award
- Honours: Ken McKenzie Trophy (CHL); Ken McKenzie Trophy (IHL); Ken McKenzie Award (AHL)

Ken McKenzie (August 19, 1923 – April 9, 2003) was a Canadian newspaper publisher and sports journalist. He served as publicity director of the National Hockey League (NHL) from 1946 to 1963. In 1947, he published the first NHL press and radio guide, and co-founded The Hockey News with Will Cote and C$383.81. McKenzie bought out his partner and later sold an 80 per cent share of The Hockey News for a reported $4-million in 1973. He stayed on as its publisher and a columnist until 1981. He also published Canadian Football News, Ontario Golf News, and the magazines Hockey Pictorial and Hockey World.

McKenzie is the namesake of three separate ice hockey awards; the Ken McKenzie Trophy of the Central Hockey League, the Ken McKenzie Trophy of the International Hockey League, and the Ken McKenzie Award of the American Hockey League. He received the Elmer Ferguson Memorial Award from the Hockey Hall of Fame in 1997, for recognition of his contributions to journalism in ice hockey. He was inducted into both the Manitoba Hockey Hall of Fame and the Manitoba Sports Hall of Fame in 1999.

== Early life ==
McKenzie was born on August 19, 1923, in Winnipeg. He played junior ice hockey as a defenceman on the St. James Canadians, then joined the Winnipeg Free Press at age 17. He began as a copy boy then became a weekly sports columnist. He enlisted in the Royal Canadian Air Force (RCAF) then was stationed in Montreal during World War II. He was hired by the Montreal Gazette after the end of war, and reported on the sport of curling.

== Hockey publisher ==
McKenzie's idea to publish a hockey newspaper began while he served in the RCAF. When he asked his friends if they would buy a paper he wrote, "they all cheered" according to him. He presented a mock up of the paper to National Hockey League (NHL) president Red Dutton in 1945. Dutton did not give approval for the paper at the time, but instead hired McKenzie to organize league statistics on a part-time basis. When Clarence Campbell became president in 1946, McKenzie was hired as a full-time public relations director for the NHL. Campbell approved the paper a year later, providing that it cost nothing to the NHL or have an impact on public relations duties.

McKenzie and Will Cote co-founded The Hockey News with C$383.81 in 1947. Initial copies were printed on mimeograph at the NHL office. McKenzie also began the first NHL press and radio guide in 1947, which later became part of the NHL Official Guide & Record Book. He used the mailing list for the guide to sell advance subscriptions for The Hockey News, priced at $2 in Canada or $3 in the United States. The first issue of The Hockey News was published on October 1, 1947, with at least 3,000 subscriptions, and circulation increased to 20,000 after one year.

McKenzie operated The Hockey News on a tight budget and kept few employees. The paper used content from writers in each city which the NHL had a team, and paid each writer a minimal rate. McKenzie told his writers, "You weren't going to get rich in this business". He recruited contributors with the promise of name recognition and said, "You may be big in Calgary or Edmonton or Vancouver, but if you write for this paper, they'll know you all across Canada".

McKenzie resigned as publicity director of the NHL to focus full-time on his publications in 1963, which then included the Hockey Pictorial and Canadian Football News. McKenzie purchased Cote's share of The Hockey News in the mid-1960s. After the 1967 NHL expansion, the paper began to feature content from its own editors.

The Hockey News briefly had competition from The Hockey Spectator, published by the World Hockey Association from 1972 to 1974. McKenzie said of his competition in 1975, "The guys who ran The Hockey Spectator were stupid, because they were doing too many other things and not concentrating on the paper. I've given every ounce of my energy and blood, sweat and tears ever since I started Hockey News and I still sell $40,000 worth of advertising each month". As of 1975, The Hockey News had a weekly circulation of 130,000, and McKenzie also published Hockey Pictorial and Hockey World as monthly magazines.

Despite the success of The Hockey News, the paper was criticized by sports columnists and journalists. Trent Frayne of the Toronto Sun said, "The establishment is always right in Hockey News. As for objectivity, it’s nothing but a house organ [for the NHL]". Red Fisher of the Montreal Star felt that, "Ken [McKenzie] comes on as strong as a crate of garlic". McKenzie insisted that, "We're going to hire the best writers and report the facts as they are". Stan Fischler stated that was "difficult to imagine" considering the influence the NHL had on its circulation in arenas, but still referred to McKenzie as "undisputed emperor of hockey publishing".

McKenzie sold an 80 per cent share of The Hockey News to Whitney Communications for a reported $4-million in 1973. He moved the paper's offices from Montreal to Toronto, stayed on as its publisher and a columnist until 1981, then sold his remaining share.

== Later life ==
McKenzie acquired Ontario Golf News in 1987, and operated the paper for the remainder of his life. He was a recreational golfer and member of several private clubs. He was married and had four children. He died on April 9, 2003, in Mississauga, due to septic shock from surgery for colon cancer. His funeral was scheduled for April 14, at St. Luke's Anglican Church in Mississauga. His remains were cremated.

== Honours and legacy ==
McKenzie became the namesake of three separate ice hockey awards in 1977. The Ken McKenzie Trophy was awarded by the Central Hockey League to its rookie of the year. The Ken McKenzie Trophy was awarded by the International Hockey League to its American-born rookie of the year. The Ken McKenzie Award was awarded by the American Hockey League in recognition of accomplishments in promoting a team in the league.

McKenzie was a recipient of the Elmer Ferguson Memorial Award from the Hockey Hall of Fame in 1997, in recognition of hockey journalism as selected by the Professional Hockey Writers' Association. The award was given on the 50th anniversary of the founding of The Hockey News. McKenzie was inducted into both the Manitoba Hockey Hall of Fame and the Manitoba Sports Hall of Fame in 1999.

McKenzie was posthumously made the namesake of the Ken McKenzie Award from the Golf Association of Ontario, after his estate donated $75,000 towards a scholarship to fund access to the game for junior golfers.
