= Claude Robert =

Canadian ice hockey player

- Born: August 10, 1928 Montreal, Quebec, Canada
- Died: January 6, 2007 (aged 78)
- Height: 5 ft 11 in (180 cm)
- Weight: 175 lb (79 kg; 12 st 7 lb)
- Position: Left wing
- Shot: Left
- Played for: Montreal Canadiens
- Playing career: 1948–1955

Joseph Denis Lucien Claude Robert (August 10, 1928 – January 6, 2007) was a Canadian ice hockey forward. He played 23 games in the National Hockey League for the Montreal Canadiens during the 1950–51 season. The rest of his career, which lasted from 1948 to 1955, was spent in the minor leagues. He was born in Montreal, Quebec.

== Career statistics ==
=== Regular season and playoffs ===
			Regular season					Playoffs
Season	Team	League	GP	G	A	Pts	PIM	GP	G	A	Pts	PIM
1947–48	Montreal Nationale	QJHL	32	21	22	43	41	12	4	11	15	8
1947–48	Montreal Nationale	M-Cup	—	—	—	—	—	8	4	6	10	10
1948–49	Montreal Royals	QSHL	44	14	7	21	28	—	—	—	—	—
1949–50	Chicoutimi Sagueneens	QSHL	60	31	25	56	79	5	1	6	7	2
1950–51	Montreal Canadiens	NHL	23	1	0	1	9	—	—	—	—	—
1950–51	Cincinnati Mohawks	AHL	26	5	5	10	28	—	—	—	—	—
1951–52	Quebec Aces	QSHL	60	22	27	49	53	15	6	7	13	20
1952–53	Quebec Aces	QSHL	29	3	12	15	35	—	—	—	—	—
1952–53	New Westminster Royals	WHL	29	8	11	19	37	7	0	4	4	0
1953–54	Ottawa Senators	QSHL	19	3	6	9	20	—	—	—	—	—
1953–54	Charlottetown Islanders	MMHL	38	23	32	55	34	7	2	0	2	4
1954–55	North Bay Trappers	NOHA	16	4	9	13	7	—	—	—	—	—
1954–55	Fort Wayne Komets/Toledo Mercurys	IHL	19	3	5	8	12	—	—	—	—	—
QSHL totals			212	73	77	150	215	20	7	13	20	22
NHL totals			23	1	0	1	9	—	—	—	—	—
