= Washington Eagles =

American minor pro ice hockey team

The Washington Eagles were an American minor pro ice hockey team from Washington, D.C. that played in the Eastern Hockey League from 1939 to 1942. During those three seasons the Eagles played 186 games with an overall record of 102 wins, 67 losses and 17 ties.

The Eagles won the league championship in 1940-41. In 1941-42 they competed for fans with the Washington Lions of the American Hockey League, which accounted for the Eagles' folding after the 1941-42 season.

== Coach ==
They were coached in all three seasons by Redvers MacKenzie.

== Notable players ==
Eagles who played in the NHL:

- Keith Allen
- Norm Burns
- Les Colvin
- Alan Kuntz
- Frank Mailley
- Rollie McLenahan
- Les Ramsay
- Roly Rossignol
