= Rollie Rousseau =

Canadian ice hockey player (1929 - 2010)

- Rousseau in 1947 with the Montreal Royals
- Born: December 8, 1929; Montreal, Quebec, Canada
- Died: October 13, 2010 (aged 80); Dorval, Quebec, Canada
- Height: 5 ft 8 in (173 cm)
- Weight: 160 lb (73 kg; 11 st 6 lb)
- Position: Defence
- Shot: Left
- Played for: Montreal Canadiens
- Playing career: 1948–1964

Joseph Roland Andre Rousseau (December 8, 1929 – October 13, 2010) was a Canadian ice hockey defenceman. He played two games in the National Hockey League for the Montreal Canadiens during the 1952–53 season. The rest of his career, which lasted from 1948 to 1968, was spent in the minor leagues. Rollie was the brother of Guy and Bobby Rousseau, who both played in the NHL. Rousseau was born in Montreal, Quebec.

== Career statistics ==
=== Regular season and playoffs ===
			Regular season					Playoffs
Season	Team	League	GP	G	A	Pts	PIM	GP	G	A	Pts	PIM
1947–48	Verdun Maple Leafs	QJHL	32	3	7	10	20	4	0	0	0	2
1948–49	Montreal Junior Royals	QJAHA	47	5	8	13	73	10	2	3	5	6
1948–49	Montreal Junior Royals	M-Cup	—	—	—	—	—	15	1	2	3	42
1948–49	Montreal Royals	QSHL	—	—	—	—	—	2	0	0	0	0
1949–50	Montreal Junior Royals	QJHL	1	1	1	2	8	—	—	—	—	—
1949–50	Laval Titan	QJHL	34	9	16	25	81	7	2	3	5	10
1949–50	Montreal Royals	QSHL	2	0	0	0	6	5	0	0	0	2
1950–51	Montreal Royals	QMHL	56	4	13	17	53	7	2	0	2	6
1951–52	Montreal Royals	QMHL	54	2	22	24	86	7	0	2	2	2
1951–52	Cincinnati Mohawks	AHL	—	—	—	—	—	3	0	0	0	2
1952–53	Montreal Canadiens	NHL	2	0	0	0	0	—	—	—	—	—
1952–53	Montreal Royals	QSHL	49	4	15	19	48	16	1	2	3	14
1953–54	Buffalo Bisons	AHL	66	5	10	15	64	3	2	0	2	2
1954–55	Montreal Royals	QSHL	59	3	11	14	78	10	0	1	1	4
1955–56	Montreal Royals	QSHL	63	5	9	14	58	13	1	2	3	8
1956–57	Chicoutimi Sagueneens	QSHL	65	1	16	17	74	10	2	1	3	2
1957–58	Chicoutimi Sagueneens	QSHL	60	1	11	12	87	6	0	0	0	0
1960–61	Granby Vics	QSHL	30	3	15	18	15	9	1	2	3	2
1960–61	Granby Vics	Al-Cup	—	—	—	—	—	7	0	5	5	14
1961–62	Granby Vics	ETSHL	20	0	5	5	14	7	2	2	4	12
1961–62	Montreal Olympics	Al-Cup	—	—	—	—	—	16	0	3	3	12
1967–68	Granby Vics	QSHL	46	17	31	48	8	—	—	—	—	—
QSHL totals			325	30	93	123	326	55	4	6	10	18
NHL totals			2	0	0	0	0	—	—	—	—	—
