= Derek Stepan =

American ice hockey player (born 1990)

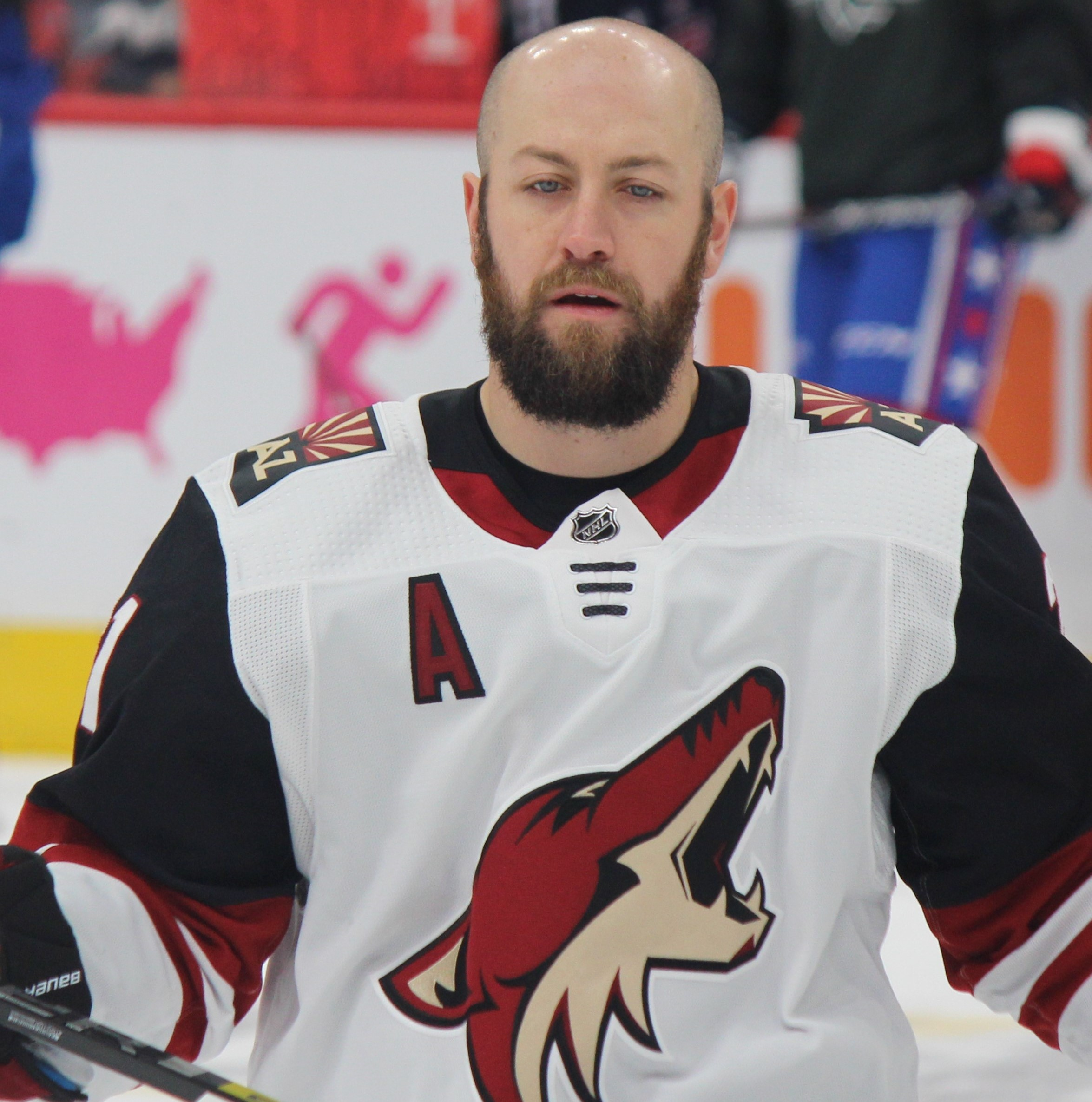
- Stepan with the Arizona Coyotes in 2019
- Born: June 18, 1990 (age 36) Hastings, Minnesota, U.S.
- Height: 6 ft 0 in (183 cm)
- Weight: 196 lb (89 kg; 14 st 0 lb)
- Position: Center
- Shot: Right
- Played for: New York Rangers; KalPa; Arizona Coyotes; Ottawa Senators; Carolina Hurricanes
- National team: United States
- NHL draft: 51st overall, 2008; New York Rangers
- Playing career: 2010–2023

Derek Kenneth Stepan (/stɛˈpɑːn/ steh-PAHN; born June 18, 1990) is an American former professional ice hockey center who played 13 seasons in the National Hockey League (NHL) for the New York Rangers, Arizona Coyotes, Ottawa Senators and Carolina Hurricanes. Stepan was drafted by the Rangers in the second round, 51st overall, in the 2008 NHL entry draft.

After being drafted, Stepan attended the University of Wisconsin, where he played for the Badgers hockey team in the Western Collegiate Hockey Association (WCHA). On July 1, 2010, he signed his first professional contract with the Rangers, forgoing his junior and senior years at Wisconsin. On October 9, 2010, he became the first player in Rangers history, and the fourth in NHL history, to score a hat trick in his NHL debut.

== Playing career ==
=== Amateur ===
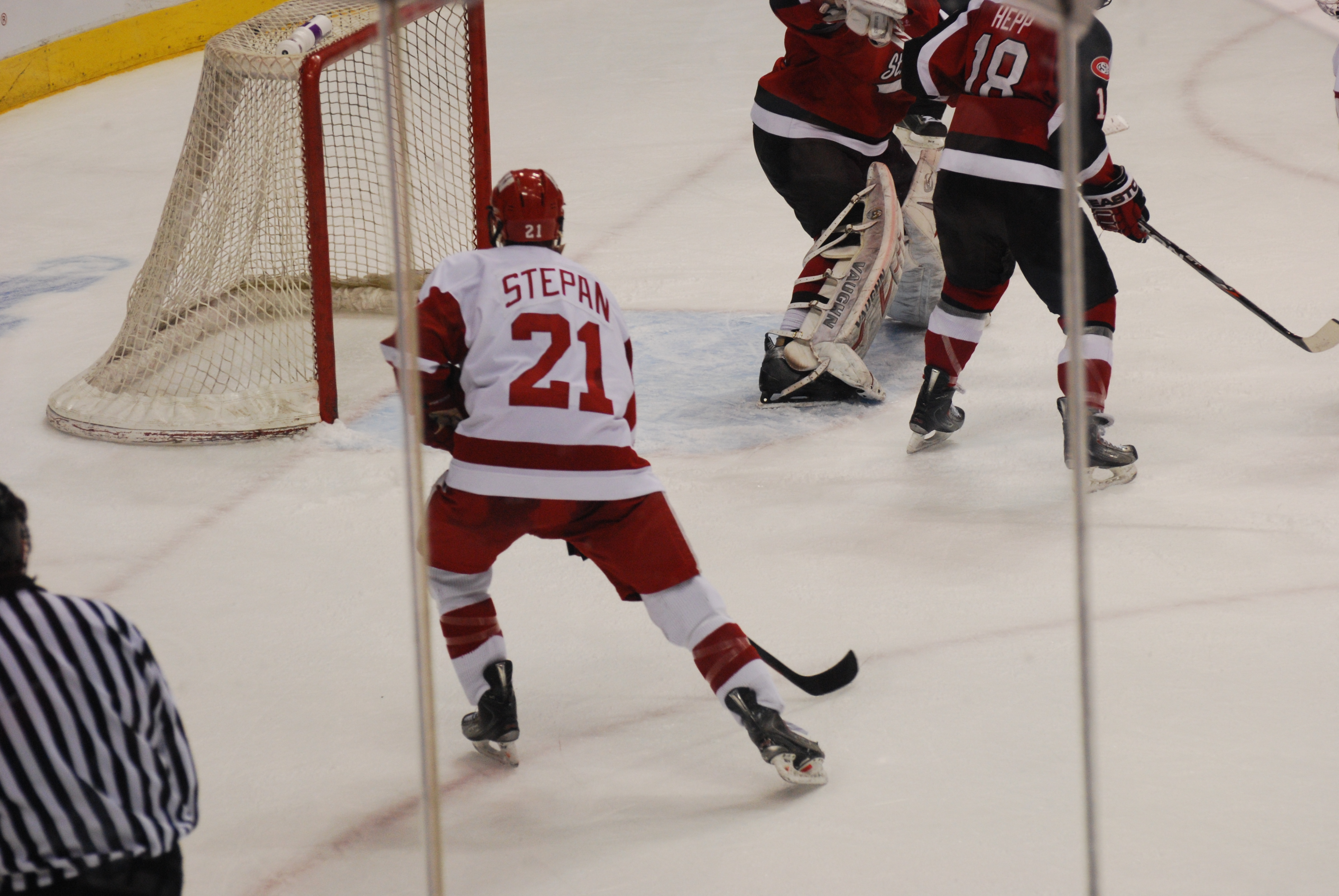
Stepan in March 2010 with the Badgers collegiate team, during his final year at the University of Wisconsin–Madison

Stepan attended high school at Shattuck-Saint Mary's, where he played on the hockey team. He scored 81 points during his junior year and 111 during his senior year at the school. He then attended the University of Wisconsin, where he played for the Badgers ice hockey team in the Western Collegiate Hockey Association (WCHA).

=== Professional (2010–2023) ===
==== New York Rangers (2010–2017) ====
On July 1, 2010, Stepan signed his first professional contract with the New York Rangers, forgoing his junior and senior years at Wisconsin. In Fall 2010, having attended the Rangers' training camp and playing for the team during the pre-season, Stepan made the transition from Wisconsin to the NHL. He scored a hat trick in his first NHL game on October 9, 2010, against Ryan Miller of the Buffalo Sabres, becoming the first rookie in Rangers history to do so, en route to a 6–3 victory. He is only the fourth player in NHL history to have scored a hat-trick in his debut, joining Alex Smart of the Montreal Canadiens (January 14, 1943), Réal Cloutier of the Quebec Nordiques (October 10, 1979) and Fabian Brunnström of the Dallas Stars (October 15, 2008). Auston Matthews of the Toronto Maple Leafs later accomplished the feat with four goals (October 12, 2016). Stepan was selected as a member of the 2011 NHL All Star roster on January 11, 2011, and performed in the NHL SuperSkills competition on January 29, 2011.

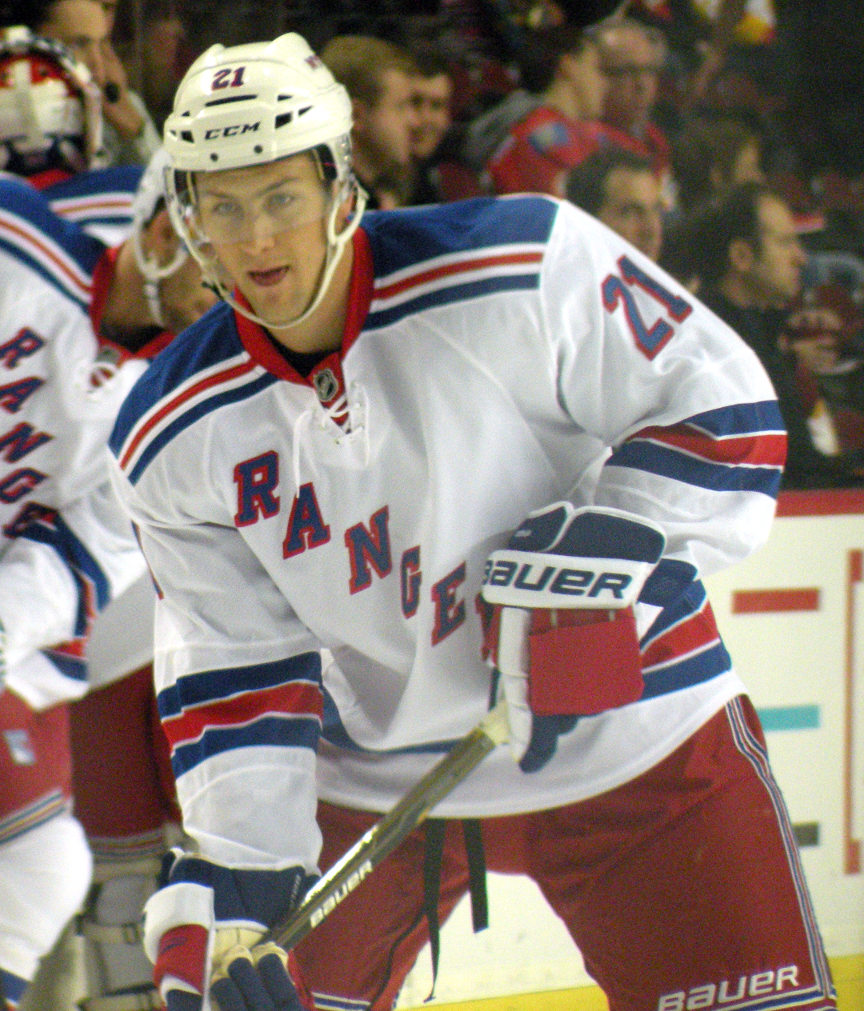
Stepan with the New York Rangers in October 2011

In the 2012–13 season, Stepan finished tied for the NHL lead with four short-handed points. On September 26, 2013, Stepan signed a new two-year, $6.15 million contract with New York for the 2013–14 and 2014–15 seasons. On September 24, 2014, Stepan suffered a broken leg in a non-contact drill during a Rangers practice.

On May 13, 2015, Stepan scored the overtime and series-winning goal against the Washington Capitals in Game 7 of the Eastern Conference Semifinals. The Rangers would eventually lose to the Tampa Bay Lightning in seven games.

Following the 2014–15 season, Stepan became a restricted free agent under the terms of the NHL Collective Bargaining Agreement (CBA). The Rangers made him a qualifying offer to retain his NHL rights. However, Stepan rejected the initial contract, which was worth $5.2 million per year. On July 5, 2015, Stepan filed for Salary Arbitration under the CBA, seeking at least $7.25 million per year. On the morning of July 27, 2015, just hours before his arbitration hearing was scheduled to occur, Stepan and the Rangers agreed to a six-year, $39 million contract lasting to the end of the 2020–21 season. Paying an average of $6.5 million annually, the contract made Stepan the second-highest-paid Rangers forward at the time behind Rick Nash, who made $7.9 million per year.

==== Arizona Coyotes (2017–2020) ====
On June 23, 2017, Stepan (along with goaltender Antti Raanta) was traded to the Arizona Coyotes in exchange for the seventh overall pick in the 2017 NHL entry draft and defenseman Tony DeAngelo. Stepan scored 14 goals with 42 assists in his first season with the Coyotes, playing in all 82 games. He was named an alternative captain for the Coyotes to begin the 2017–18 season.

During the 2018–19 season, Stepan played in his 600th career NHL game on October 10, 2018, becoming the first player drafted in the 2008 NHL Entry Draft but who was not a first-rounder to reach that milestone.

==== Ottawa Senators (2020–2021) ====
On December 26, 2020, after three seasons with the Coyotes, Stepan was traded to the Ottawa Senators for a second-round pick in the 2021 NHL entry draft which originally belonged to the Columbus Blue Jackets. In the pandemic delayed 2020–21 season, with the divisional re-alignment restricting the Senators to remain in Canada, Stepan struggled to adapt away from family; while in the final year of his contract, the Senators looked to explore trade possibilities. Before a trade could be completed, after registering 1 goal and 6 points through 20 games, Stepan suffered a dislocated shoulder injured in a 5-4 shootout victory over the Montreal Canadiens on February 23, 2021.

On March 2, 2021, it was announced that Stepan would undergo season-ending shoulder surgery to repair a damaged labrum, effectively ending his tenure with the Senators.

==== Carolina Hurricanes (2021–2023) ====
As an unrestricted free agent, Stepan signed a one-year, $1.35 million contract with the Carolina Hurricanes on July 31, 2021. Assuming a depth role among the Hurricanes forward group, Stepan tallied 9 goals and 19 points through 58 games in the 2021–22 season.

Un-signed through the following summer, Stepan continued with the Hurricanes in initially accepting a professional tryout contract to participate in training camp and pre-season for the following 2022–23 season. After co-leading the team in goals through the pre-season, Stepan was signed to a one-year, $750,000 contract with the Hurricanes on October 11, 2022.

== Post-playing career ==
On October 3, 2023, Stepan announced his retirement from professional hockey.

Stepan is currently working for the Minnesota Wild, serving as a player development coach in the hockey operations office.

== International play ==
Medal record

Men's ice hockey

Representing the United States

World Junior Championships
Gold medal – first place	2010 Saskatoon	

At the 2010 World Junior Championships, Stepan was the captain of the United States team and led the tournament in scoring with four goals and ten assists in seven games, leading to an All-Star Team selection. He captained the United States to win their second gold medal ever, defeating Canada in overtime.

Stepan joined the United States senior team at the 2011 World Championship, playing alongside Rangers teammate Ryan McDonagh and Rangers prospect Chris Kreider. He finished the tournament with seven points in seven games, and was selected as a top three player on the U.S.

== Personal life ==
Stepan was born into a hockey family, as his father Brad was also a draft pick of the Rangers in the 1985 NHL entry draft. Stepan's younger cousin, Zachary, was selected 112th overall by the Nashville Predators in the 2012 NHL entry draft. On August 9, 2014, Stepan married his longtime girlfriend Stephanie Kent in their home state, Minnesota. Stephanie gave birth to the couple's first child on October 27, 2015, and their second child on September 21, 2017.

== Career statistics ==
=== Regular season and playoffs ===
			Regular season					Playoffs
Season	Team	League	GP	G	A	Pts	PIM	GP	G	A	Pts	PIM
2006–07	Shattuck-Saint Mary's	HS-Prep	63	38	32	70	22	—	—	—	—	—
2007–08	Shattuck-Saint Mary's	HS-Prep	60	44	67	111	22	—	—	—	—	—
2008–09	University of Wisconsin	WCHA	40	9	24	33	6	—	—	—	—	—
2009–10	University of Wisconsin	WCHA	41	12	42	54	10	—	—	—	—	—
2010–11	New York Rangers	NHL	82	21	24	45	20	5	0	0	0	2
2011–12	New York Rangers	NHL	82	17	34	51	22	20	1	8	9	4
2012–13	KalPa	SM-l	12	2	2	4	0	—	—	—	—	—
2012–13	New York Rangers	NHL	48	18	26	44	12	12	4	1	5	2
2013–14	New York Rangers	NHL	82	17	40	57	18	24	5	10	15	2
2014–15	New York Rangers	NHL	68	16	39	55	22	19	5	7	12	10
2015–16	New York Rangers	NHL	72	22	31	53	20	5	2	0	2	0
2016–17	New York Rangers	NHL	81	17	38	55	16	12	2	4	6	4
2017–18	Arizona Coyotes	NHL	82	14	42	56	26	—	—	—	—	—
2018–19	Arizona Coyotes	NHL	72	15	20	35	14	—	—	—	—	—
2019–20	Arizona Coyotes	NHL	70	10	18	28	16	9	1	4	5	6
2020–21	Ottawa Senators	NHL	20	1	5	6	8	—	—	—	—	—
2021–22	Carolina Hurricanes	NHL	58	9	10	19	14	3	0	0	0	0
2022–23	Carolina Hurricanes	NHL	73	5	6	11	8	11	0	1	1	2
NHL totals			890	182	333	515	216	120	20	35	55	32

=== International ===
Year	Team	Event	Result	GP	G	A	Pts	PIM
2010	United States	WJC	1st place, gold medalist(s)	7	4	10	14	4
2011	United States	WC	8th	7	2	5	7	2
2014	United States	OG	4th	1	0	0	0	0
2016	United States	WCH	7th	3	0	1	1	0
Junior totals				7	4	10	14	4
Senior totals				11	2	6	8	2
