= Verdun Maple Leafs =

- City: Verdun, Quebec
- League: QSHL, QJHL
- Operated: 1920s to 1972
- Home arena: Verdun Auditorium

The Verdun Maple Leafs was the name of three ice hockey clubs that existed in Verdun, Quebec, including a senior hockey team, and two junior teams. The Maple Leafs played home games at the Verdun Auditorium.

== History ==
The first club was a senior hockey team established in the early 1920s. They played in the Montreal City Hockey League until 1937, then switched to the Quebec Senior Hockey League. The team folded after 1942. This senior team coexisted with its farm club, a junior team from 1933 to 1950, also known as the Maple Leafs. Verdun was a finalist for the Eastern Canadian Championship and the George Richardson Memorial Trophy in 1939 and 1940, but lost both times to the Oshawa Generals.

The Verdun Maple Leafs were revived in 1963 playing in the Montreal Metropolitan Junior Hockey League. The team switched to the Quebec Junior Hockey League in 1965. Verdun challenged against for the Eastern Canadian Championship in 1968, but was defeated by the Niagara Falls Flyers. The following season, Verdun was promoted to the Quebec Major Junior Hockey League, where it played from 1969 to 1972. Serge Martel won the Michel Bergeron Trophy as the league's rookie of the year, playing for Verdun in 1969–70.

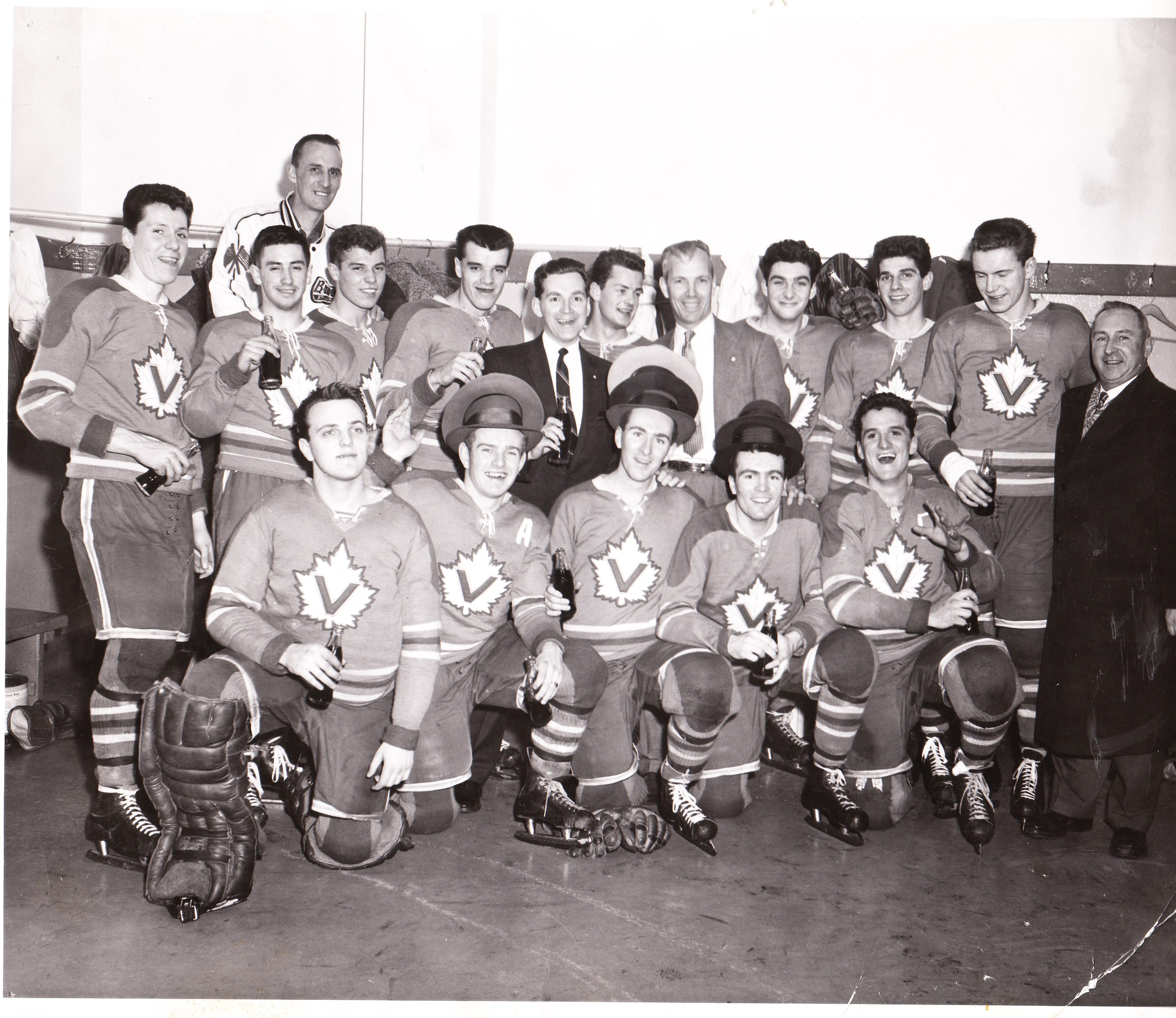
1957–1958 edition of the team

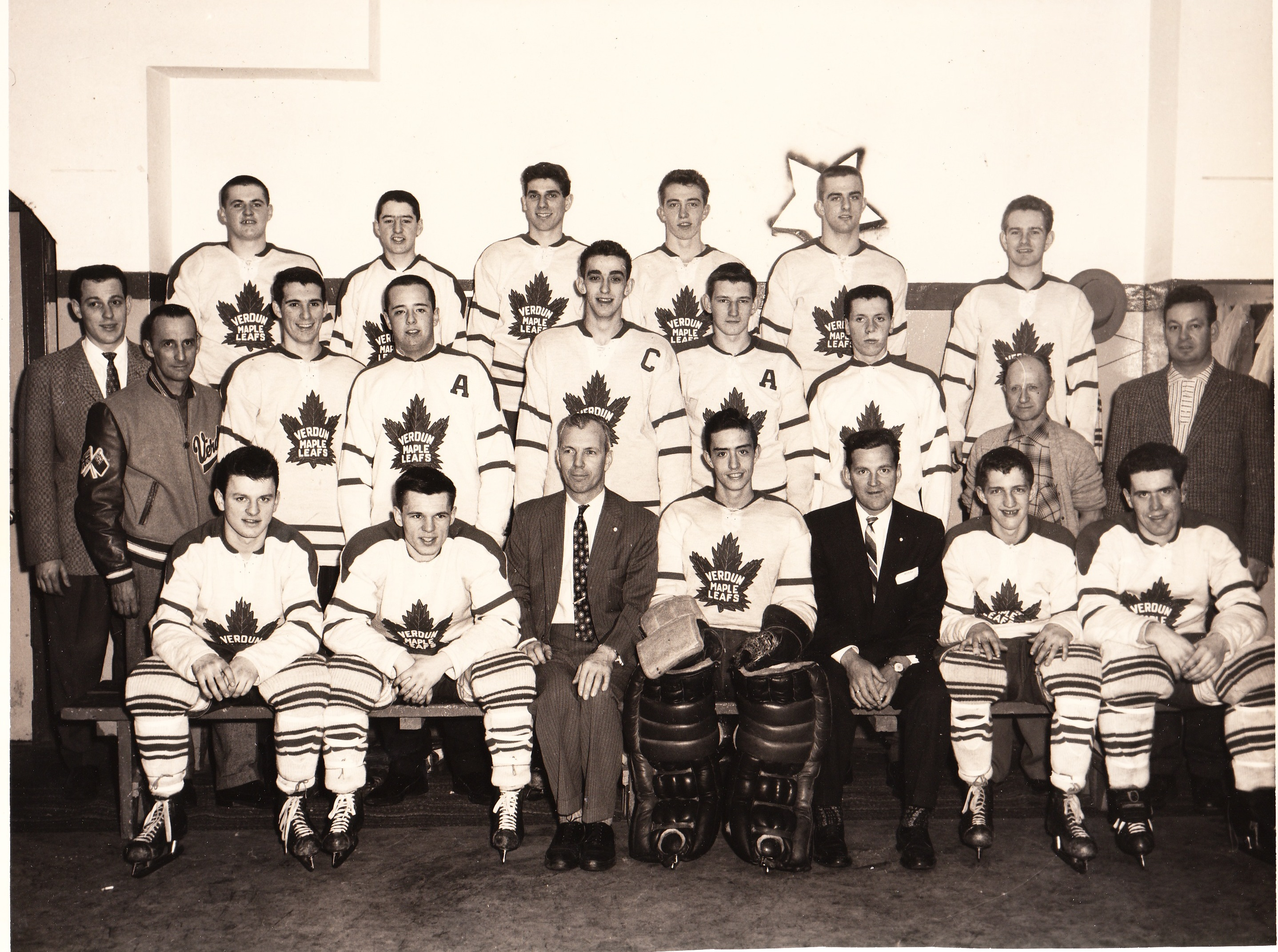
1958-59 edition of the team

== National Hockey League alumni ==
List of Maple Leafs alumni who also played in the National Hockey League. Two Hockey Hall of Fame members played for the Maple Leafs. Emile Bouchard and Maurice Richard were teammates during the 1939–40 season.

Senior Verdun Maple Leafs (1924–1942)

- Paul Bibeault
- Rene Boileau
- Conrad Bourcier
- Jean Bourcier
- Claude Bourque
- George Brown
- Maurice Croghan
- Hank D'Amore
- Connie Dion
- Frank Eddolls
- Bob Fillion
- Ernie Laforce
- Albert Leduc
- Fern Majeau
- William Meronek
- Roland Paulhus
- Les Ramsay
- Melvin Read
- Maurice Richard
- Alex Smart
- Bill Summerhill
- Moe White
- Don Willson

Junior Verdun Maple Leafs (1934–1950)

- Jim Bartlett
- Paul Bibeault
- Émile Bouchard
- Conrad Bourcier
- Maurice Croghan
- Connie Dion
- Frank Eddolls
- Eddie Emberg
- Bob Fillion
- Jean-Paul Gladu
- Fern Majeau
- Jim Morrison
- Marcel Pelletier
- Jimmy Peters Sr.
- Les Ramsay
- Melvin Read
- Maurice Richard
- Roly Rossignol
- Rollie Rousseau
- Moe White
- Larry Zeidel

Verdun Maple Leafs (1963–1972)

- Bob Berry
- Richard Brodeur
- Guy Charron
- Rey Comeau
- Jude Drouin
- André Dupont
- Peter Folco
- Richard Grenier
- Pierre Hamel
- Guy Lapointe
- Gilles Meloche
- Jake Rathwell
- Bob Sauvé

== Season-by-season results ==
Season-by-season results for the Verdun Maple Leafs of the Quebec Junior Hockey League:

Season	Games	Won	Lost	Tied	Points	Pct %	Goals for	Goals against	Standing
1969–70	56	20	35	1	41	0.366	218	300	4th West
1970–71	62	27	33	2	56	0.452	252	306	5th QMJHL
1971–72	61	20	40	1	41	0.336	252	366	8th QMJHL
