= Ken McKenzie Trophy (IHL) =

The Ken McKenzie Trophy was awarded annually by the International Hockey League to the American-born player judged to be most outstanding in his first season. The award is named for Ken McKenzie, the co-founder and longtime president and publisher of The Hockey News.

== Winners ==
| Season | Player | Team |
|---|---|---|
| 1977–78 | Mike Eruzione | Toledo Goaldiggers |
| 1978–79 | Jon Fontas | Saginaw Gears |
| 1979–80 | Bob Janecyk | Fort Wayne Komets |
| 1980–81 | Mike Labianca | Toledo Goaldiggers |
| 1980–81 | Steve Janaszak | Fort Wayne Komets |
| 1981–82 | Steve Salvucci | Saginaw Gears |
| 1982–83 | Paul Fenton | Peoria Prancers |
| 1983–84 | Mike Krensing | Muskegon Mohawks |
| 1984–85 | Bill Schafhauser | Kalamazoo Wings |
| 1985–86 | Brian Noonan | Saginaw Generals |
| 1986–87 | Ray LeBlanc | Flint Spirits |
| 1987–88 | Dan Woodley | Flint Spirits |
| 1988–89 | Paul Ranheim | Salt Lake Golden Eagles |
| 1989–90 | Tim Sweeney | Salt Lake Golden Eagles |
| 1990–91 | C J Young | Salt Lake Golden Eagles |
| 1991–92 | Kevin Wortman | Salt Lake Golden Eagles |
| 1992–93 | Mark Beaufait | Kansas City Blades |
| 1993–94 | Chris Rogles | Indianapolis Ice |
| 1994–95 | Chris Marinucci | Denver Grizzlies |
| 1995–96 | Brett Lievers | Utah Grizzlies |
| 1996–97 | Brian Felsner | Orlando Solar Bears |
| 1997–98 | Eric Nickulas | Orlando Solar Bears |
| 1998–99 | Mark Mowers | Milwaukee Admirals |
| 1999–00 | Andrew Berenzweig | Milwaukee Admirals |
| 2000–01 | Brian Pothier | Orlando Solar Bears |
