= Guy Rousseau =

Canadian ice hockey player

- Born: December 21, 1934 Montreal, Quebec, Canada
- Died: November 23, 2016 (aged 81) Montreal, Quebec, Canada
- Height: 5 ft 6 in (168 cm)
- Weight: 140 lb (64 kg; 10 st 0 lb)
- Position: Left wing
- Shot: Left
- Played for: Montreal Canadiens
- Playing career: 1954–1969

Joseph Lucien Guy Rousseau (December 21, 1934 – November 23, 2016) was a Canadian professional ice hockey forward. During his career, which lasted from 1954 to 1969, Rousseau mainly played in the minor leagues, though he also played four games in the National Hockey League for the Montreal Canadiens, two each during the 1954–55 and 1956–57 seasons. In 1967, he served as the Executive Director of the Canada Winter Games in Quebec City. Guy was the brother of Rollie and Bobby Rousseau.

== Career statistics ==
=== Regular season and playoffs ===
			Regular season					Playoffs
Season	Team	League	GP	G	A	Pts	PIM	GP	G	A	Pts	PIM
1950–51	Verdun LaSalle	QJHL	41	6	21	27	21	3	0	1	1	0
1951–52	Saint-Jerome Aigles	QJHL	50	33	66	99	28	—	—	—	—	—
1952–53	Quebec Citadelles	QJHL	46	43	52	95	12	7	4	5	9	8
1953–54	Quebec Frontenacs	QJHL	51	42	47	89	21	8	11	10	21	4
1953–54	Quebec Frontenacs	M-Cup	—	—	—	—	—	8	5	13	18	8
1954–55	Montreal Canadiens	NHL	2	0	1	1	0	—	—	—	—	—
1954–55	Quebec Citadelles	QJHL	40	22	33	55	42	9	8	7	15	6
1954–55	Quebec Frontenacs	M-Cup	—	—	—	—	—	9	3	11	14	6
1955–56	Montreal Royals	QSHL	61	11	27	38	36	13	1	6	7	4
1956–57	Montreal Canadiens	NHL	2	0	0	0	0	—	—	—	—	—
1956–57	Montreal Royals	QSHL	66	15	27	42	46	4	0	1	1	4
1957–58	Chicoutimi Sagueneens	QSHL	63	29	41	70	30	6	0	2	2	0
1958–59	Rochester Americans	AHL	65	20	20	40	22	3	2	1	3	4
1959–60	Rochester Americans	AHL	42	15	16	31	16	11	7	4	11	2
1960–61	Rochester Americans	AHL	71	26	41	67	30	—	—	—	—	—
1961–62	Quebec Aces	AHL	63	19	21	40	26	—	—	—	—	—
1962–63	Quebec Aces	AHL	47	7	21	28	0	—	—	—	—	—
1963–64	Cleveland Barons	AHL	70	18	16	34	11	9	6	3	9	4
1964–65	Quebec Aces	AHL	41	10	18	28	10	5	1	0	1	0
1965–66	Sherbrooke Saints	QSHL	40	8	10	18	10	—	—	—	—	—
1966–67	Saint-Hyacinthe Gaulois	QSHL	—	—	—	—	—	—	—	—	—	—
1967–68	Saint-Hyacinthe Gaulois	QSHL	—	—	—	—	—	—	—	—	—	—
1968–69	Saint-Hyacinthe Gaulois	QSHL	—	—	—	—	—	—	—	—	—	—
AHL totals			399	115	153	268	115	28	16	8	24	10
NHL totals			4	0	1	1	2	—	—	—	—	—
