= NHL Official Guide & Record Book =

The NHL Official Guide & Record Book was the complete statistical record of the National Hockey League, published annually by the league until the league ended its production after the publication of the book following the 2017–18 season. An augmented and dynamic version of the information contained in the book can now be found at records.nhl.com. The book contained detailed year-by-year data on 2,000 active players, all-time records, club rosters, NHL entry draft information, along with player and goaltender data panels and photos. It was long been considered "the bible of (ice) hockey" and was the book the NHL issued to reporters, broadcasters, scouts and general managers. It was a large-format paperback book and was in print from 1932 through the 2017–18 season..

The first editions were edited by Hockey Hall of Fame Honoured Member James C. Hendy. League publicist Ken McKenzie took over editing beginning in 1947. He would later become the founding editor-publisher of The Hockey News. Statisticians Ron Andrews and Carol Randall managed the book during the NHL's expansion eras of the 1960s, 1970s and into the 1980s. Benny Ercolani had been the Head Statistician from the 1980s to the last edition in 2017–18.

By the mid-1980s, the old digest-sized format of the NHL Guide could no longer accommodate the increased number of league players and clubs. Early in 1984, Dan Diamond, a Toronto-based editor and publisher, proposed a redesign and reorganization of the NHL Guide, converting it to a magazine-sized format and incorporating photographs for the first time since the Hendy editions. The NHL accepted Diamond's proposal and the redesigned format made its first appearance in the fall of 1984 in a 352-page edition. Twenty-five years later, the book had grown to 656 pages and included a mug-shot photo of every active NHL player.

Traditionally, the Guide's cover had been printed every year in the colors of the reigning Stanley Cup champions.
