= Ryan Poehling =

American ice hockey player (born 1999)

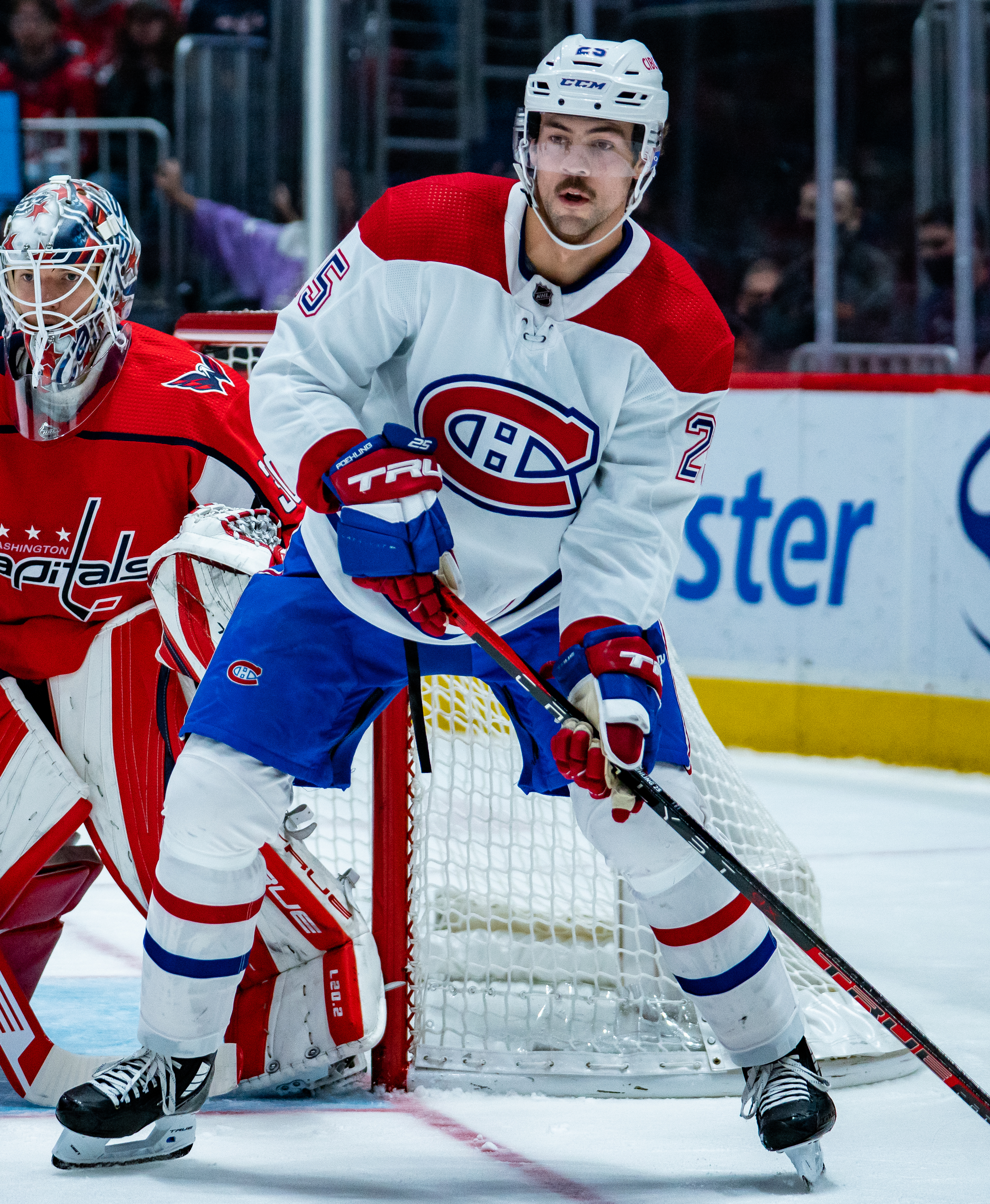
- Poehling with the Montreal Canadiens in 2021
- Born: January 3, 1999 (age 27) Lakeville, Minnesota, U.S.
- Height: 6 ft 2 in (188 cm)
- Weight: 206 lb (93 kg; 14 st 10 lb)
- Position: Center
- Shoots: Left
- NHL team Former teams: Anaheim Ducks; Montreal Canadiens; Pittsburgh Penguins; Philadelphia Flyers
- NHL draft: 25th overall, 2017; Montreal Canadiens
- Playing career: 2019–present

Ryan Poehling (/ˈpeɪlɪŋ/ PAY-ling; born January 3, 1999) is an American professional ice hockey player who is a center for the Anaheim Ducks of the National Hockey League (NHL). He was selected in the first round, 25th overall, by the Montreal Canadiens in the 2017 NHL entry draft. Poehling has also previously played for the Pittsburgh Penguins and Philadelphia Flyers.

== Playing career ==
=== Amateur ===
After playing two seasons at Lakeville North High School, Poehling was drafted first overall by the Lincoln Stars in the 2015 United States Hockey League draft. He joined the Stars during the 2015–16 season after his high school season was over. In May 2016, Poehling announced he had graduated high school early and signed with St. Cloud State University for the 2016–17 season. He stated that part of his decision was due to his brothers committing to St. Cloud as well.

In his freshman season at St. Cloud, Poehling played in 35 games and recorded 13 points. He was also named to the 2016–17 NCHC Academic All–Conference Team alongside his brothers. Poehling was drafted in the first round, twenty-fifth overall, by the Montreal Canadiens in the 2017 NHL entry draft. Poehling went on and had a successful sophomore year with St. Cloud State. He notched 31 points in 36 games and helped his team win the regular season in the NCHC. Poehling scored the game-winning goal in a 4–2 win over the Denver Pioneers to help St. Cloud win the Penrose Cup as regular season champions.

Poehling participated in the Canadiens 2018 Development Camp prior to the 2018–19 season, however, he chose to return to St. Cloud State for his Junior year to try to win the national championship.

=== Professional ===
==== Montreal Canadiens ====
On March 31, 2019, Poehling signed a three-year entry-level contract with the Canadiens, joining the team for the remainder of the season. During his NHL debut in Montreal's season-closing game against the Toronto Maple Leafs on April 6, 2019, Poehling scored a hat trick, the first Canadiens player to achieve this feat since Alex Smart on January 14, 1943. This was then followed by a goal in the shootout, winning the game for the Canadiens.

Poehling split the 2019–20 season with the Canadiens and their AHL affiliate, the Laval Rocket. Poehling was unable to replicate the success he found in his first game, scoring one goal and one assist for two points in 27 NHL games; his first AHL stint was also unremarkable, scoring 13 points in 36 games with the Rocket before the season was canceled due to complications of the COVID-19 pandemic.

While Poehling remained unable to secure a spot in the Canadiens' lineup, he improved considerably in 2020–21 season, spending the season with the Rocket and scoring 25 points in 28 games. His season was cut short, as on May 6, 2021, the Canadiens announced Poehling suffered a season-ending wrist injury which required surgery. He was unable to join the team as they went to the Stanley Cup Finals, where they were defeated by the Tampa Bay Lightning.

As a restricted free agent with the Canadiens, Poehling was signed to a two-year contract extension, with the final year of his deal on a one-way basis on August 27, 2021. On the heels of a successful season in the AHL, there were expectations that Poehling would make the Canadiens lineup in one of the centre positions vacated following the off-season departures of Phillip Danault and Jesperi Kotkaniemi. However, Poehling's performance in the pre-season was judged to be underwhelming by many. He was sent down to the AHL again on October 13, shortly after the Canadiens claimed centreman Adam Brooks from the Maple Leafs off waivers. After seven games with the Rocket, Poehling was called up by the Canadiens, who were plagued by injuries amidst a historically poor start. Poehling's play in this new stint in the roster attracted praise, notably managing a two-goal performance in a victory over the Nashville Predators.

==== Pittsburgh Penguins ====
On July 16, 2022, Poehling was traded to the Pittsburgh Penguins, along with defenseman Jeff Petry, in exchange for defenseman Mike Matheson and a 2023 fourth-round pick. In the following 2022–23 season, appearing in a depth forward role, Poehling recorded seven goals and 14 points through 53 regular season games with the Penguins.

==== Philadelphia Flyers ====
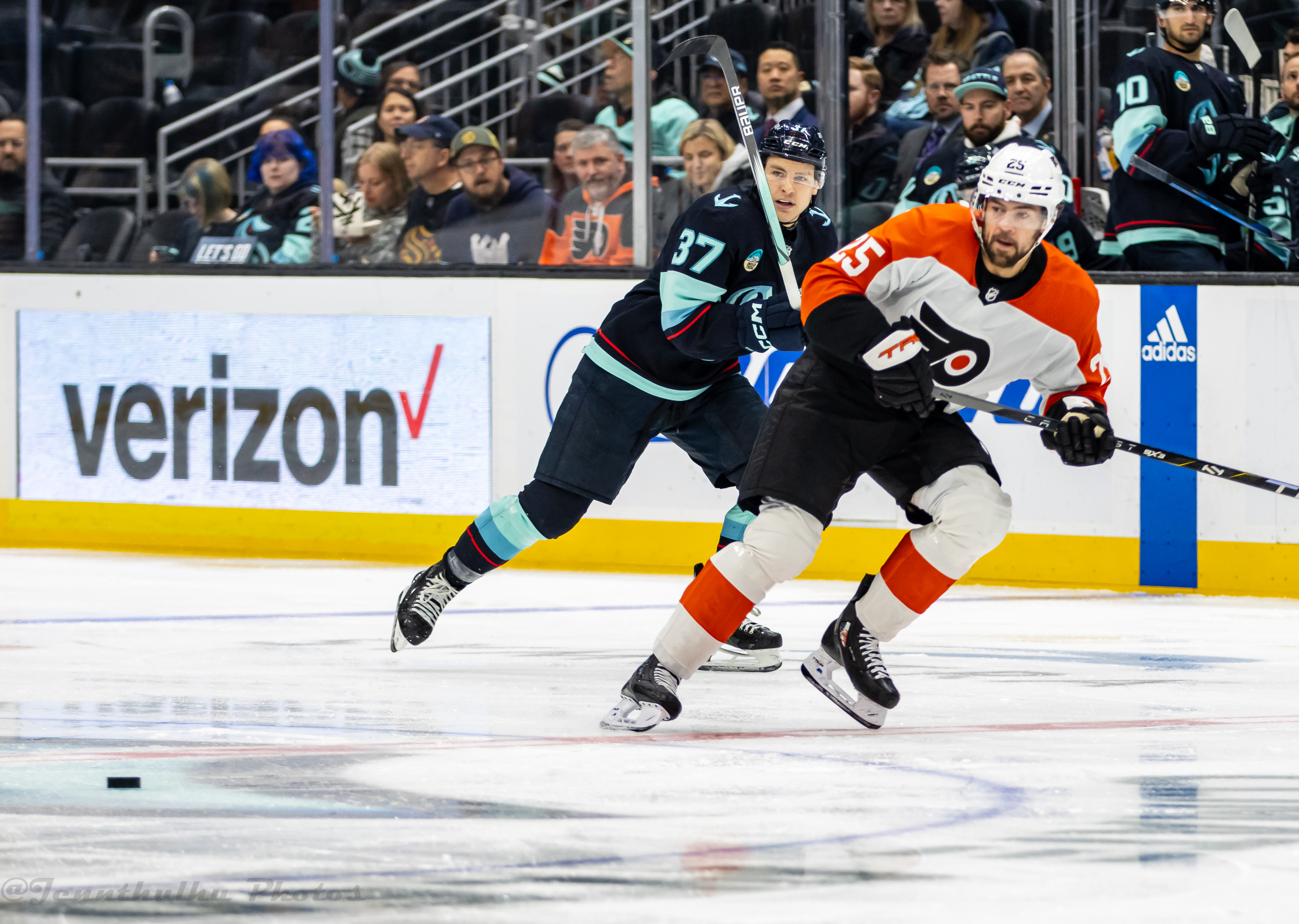
Poehling (right) and Yanni Gourde of the Seattle Kraken in 2023.

As a free agent from the Penguins, on July 1, 2023, Poehling was signed to a one-year, $1.4 million contract with the Philadelphia Flyers for the 2023–24 season. On January 27, 2024, Poehling signed a two-year contract extension with the Flyers.

==== Anaheim Ducks ====
On June 23, 2025, Poehling, along with a 2025 second-round pick, and a 2026 fourth-round pick, was traded to the Anaheim Ducks in exchange for Trevor Zegras.

Additional information needed

He scored the first overtime game winner of his career during Game 4 of the Ducks' series against the Edmonton Oilers during the 2026 Stanley Cup playoffs, when he squeaked the puck past goaltender Tristan Jarry. The goal was controversial because it was not immediately called a goal on the ice due to the blade of Jarry's skate obscuring both the goal line and the edge of the puck. The referees conferred at center ice, signaled a good goal, and this was upheld by review in Toronto.

== International play ==
Poehling scored three points in the 2018 World Junior Championships to help the United States national junior team win the bronze medal.

On December 24, 2018, Poehling was named to United States roster for the 2019 World Junior Championships. Poehling recorded a natural hat trick and one assist on December 30, against Sweden national junior team to help close a 4–0 gap and lead the game to overtime. While United States lost 3–2 to Finland national junior team in the gold medal game, Poehling was named the tournament MVP and best forward. He ended the tournament with eight points (5G, 3A) in six games.

== Personal life ==
Poehling has two older twin brothers, Nick and Jack, who also play ice hockey. His uncle Stan Palmer played hockey for the University of Minnesota Duluth and was drafted 177th overall by the Montreal Canadiens in the 1977 NHL amateur draft.

== Career statistics ==
=== Regular season and playoffs ===
			Regular season					Playoffs
Season	Team	League	GP	G	A	Pts	PIM	GP	G	A	Pts	PIM
2013–14	Lakeville North High	SSC	24	11	16	27	21	3	0	6	6	0
2014–15	Lakeville North High	SSC	25	14	24	38	12	3	1	8	9	14
2015–16	Lakeville North High	SSC	25	20	34	54	10	3	1	7	8	2
2015–16	Lincoln Stars	USHL	9	2	2	4	0	—	—	—	—	—
2016–17	St. Cloud State	NCHC	35	7	6	13	12	—	—	—	—	—
2017–18	St. Cloud State	NCHC	36	14	17	31	30	—	—	—	—	—
2018–19	St. Cloud State	NCHC	36	8	23	31	34	—	—	—	—	—
2018–19	Montreal Canadiens	NHL	1	3	0	3	0	—	—	—	—	—
2019–20	Laval Rocket	AHL	36	5	8	13	6	—	—	—	—	—
2019–20	Montreal Canadiens	NHL	27	1	1	2	4	—	—	—	—	—
2020–21	Laval Rocket	AHL	28	11	14	25	2	—	—	—	—	—
2021–22	Laval Rocket	AHL	7	3	3	6	0	—	—	—	—	—
2021–22	Montreal Canadiens	NHL	57	9	8	17	6	—	—	—	—	—
2022–23	Pittsburgh Penguins	NHL	53	7	7	14	8	—	—	—	—	—
2023–24	Philadelphia Flyers	NHL	77	11	17	28	6	—	—	—	—	—
2024–25	Philadelphia Flyers	NHL	68	12	19	31	16	—	—	—	—	—
2025–26	Anaheim Ducks	NHL	75	11	25	36	12	11	4	1	5	4
NHL totals			358	54	77	131	52	11	4	1	5	4

=== International ===
Year	Team	Event	Result	GP	G	A	Pts	PIM
2016	United States	IH18	2nd place, silver medalist(s)	4	4	2	6	6
2017	United States	U18	1st place, gold medalist(s)	7	3	2	5	6
2018	United States	WJC	3rd place, bronze medalist(s)	7	1	2	3	0
2019	United States	WJC	2nd place, silver medalist(s)	6	5	3	8	2
Junior totals				24	13	9	22	14

== Awards and honors ==
Award	Year	Ref
College
All-NCHC First Team	2019	
International
World Junior Championship Tournament MVP	2019	
World Junior Championship Best Forward	2019	
World Junior Championship Media All -Star team	2019	

Awards and achievements
Preceded by Mikhail Sergachev	Montreal Canadiens first-round draft pick 2017	Succeeded by Jesperi Kotkaniemi
