= Felix Rossignol =

Canadian ice hockey player

- Born: October 20, 1920 Edmundston, New Brunswick, Canada
- Died: May 31, 1981 (aged 60) Edmundston, New Brunswick, Canada
- Height: 5 ft 9 in (175 cm)
- Weight: 170 lb (77 kg; 12 st 2 lb)
- Position: Right Wing
- Shot: Right
- Played for: Montreal Canadiens; Detroit Red Wings
- Playing career: 1937–1963

Felix Roland "Rollie" Rossignol (October 18, 1920 – May 31, 1981) was a Canadian professional ice hockey forward who played 14 games in the National Hockey League for the Montreal Canadiens and Detroit Red Wings between 1944 and 1946. The rest of his career, which lasted from 1937 to 1963, was mainly spent in senior leagues. He was born in Edmundston, New Brunswick. Rossignol died in 1981 and is buried in Bathurst, New Brunswick.

== Career statistics ==
=== Regular season and playoffs ===
			Regular season					Playoffs
Season	Team	League	GP	G	A	Pts	PIM	GP	G	A	Pts	PIM
1936–37	Edmundston High School	HS-NB	1	0	0	0	0	3	1	0	1	2
1937–38	Edmunston Fraser Pulp	NNBHL	8	7	2	9	6	2	1	0	1	6
1938–39	Edmunston Fraser Pulp	NNBHL	5	5	8	13	2	2	2	0	2	—
1938–39	Edmunston Eskimos	ECSHL	3	1	1	2	—	4	1	2	3	2
1938–39	Edmunston High School	HS-NB	—	—	—	—	—	1	1	1	2	0
1939–40	Verdun Maple Leafs	QJAHA	12	2	5	7	10	4	1	2	3	11
1939–40	Verdun Maple Leafs	QSHL	1	0	0	0	0	—	—	—	—	—
1939–40	Verdun Maple Leafs	M-Cup	—	—	—	—	—	7	7	4	11	8
1940–41	Washington Eagles	EAHL	65	23	23	46	44	2	0	0	0	0
1940–41	Verdun Maple Leafs	QSHL	1	0	0	0	0	—	—	—	—	—
1941–42	Quebec Aces	QSHL	32	12	10	22	30	7	1	1	2	2
1941–42	Quebec Aces	Al-Cup	—	—	—	—	—	6	0	1	1	0
1942–43	Quebec Morton Aces	QSHL	34	16	16	32	18	4	1	1	2	4
1943–44	Quebec Aces	QSHL	25	22	18	40	20	15	13	13	26	2
1943–44	Detroit Red Wings	NHL	1	0	1	1	0	—	—	—	—	—
1943–44	Quebec Aces	Al-Cup	—	—	—	—	—	9	10	8	18	6
1944–45	Montreal Canadiens	NHL	5	2	2	4	2	1	0	0	0	2
1944–45	Pittsburgh Hornets	AHL	38	19	24	43	29	—	—	—	—	—
1945–46	Detroit Red Wings	NHL	8	1	2	3	4	—	—	—	—	—
1945–46	Indianapolis Capitals	AHL	48	26	21	47	25	5	1	1	2	4
1946–47	St. Louis Flyers	AHL	31	6	9	15	15	—	—	—	—	—
1946–47	Providence Reds	AHL	27	11	10	21	10	—	—	—	—	—
1947–48	Providence Reds	AHL	6	2	2	4	2	—	—	—	—	—
1949–50	Quebec Aces	QSHL	42	12	23	35	17	9	1	1	2	—
1950–51	Jonquiere Aces	SLSHL	—	—	—	—	—	—	—	—	—	—
1951–52	Jonquiere Aces	SLSHL	—	—	—	—	—	—	—	—	—	—
1952–53	Mont Joli Castors	SLSHL	58	42	59	101	75	—	—	—	—	—
1953–54	Riviere-du-Loup Raiders	SLSHL	8	2	5	7	4	—	—	—	—	—
1953–54	Dalhousie Rangers	NNBHL	32	25	24	49	41	—	—	—	—	—
1954–55	Dalhousie Rangers	NNBHL	32	43	62	105	28	—	—	—	—	—
1955–56	Bathurst Papermakers	NNBHL	36	40	42	82	24	—	—	—	—	—
1956–57	Bathurst Papermakers	NNBHL	48	21	42	63	34	6	4	4	8	2
1957–58	Bathurst Papermakers	NNBHL	36	12	53	65	37	—	—	—	—	—
1958–59	Bathurst Papermakers	NNBHL	36	13	23	36	30	—	—	—	—	—
1959–60	Bathurst Papermakers	NNBHL	—	—	—	—	—	—	—	—	—	—
1960–61	Bathurst Papermakers	NNBHL	—	—	—	—	—	—	—	—	—	—
1961–62	Bathurst Papermakers	NNBHL	36	17	27	44	16	—	—	—	—	—
1962–63	Bathurst Papermakers	NNBHL	36	6	12	18	—14	—	—	—	—	—
NHL totals			14	3	5	8	6	1	0	0	0	2
