= Paul Ranheim =

American ice hockey player (born 1966)

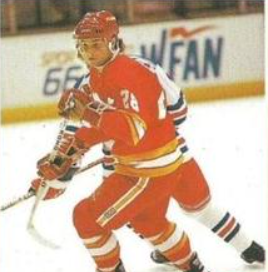
- Born: January 25, 1966 (age 60) St. Louis, Missouri, U.S.
- Height: 6 ft 1 in (185 cm)
- Weight: 210 lb (95 kg; 15 st 0 lb)
- Position: Left wing
- Shot: Right
- Played for: Calgary Flames; Hartford Whalers; Carolina Hurricanes; Philadelphia Flyers; Phoenix Coyotes
- National team: United States
- NHL draft: 38th overall, 1984; Calgary Flames
- Playing career: 1988–2003

Paul Stephen Ranheim (born January 25, 1966) is an American former professional ice hockey forward who played 15 seasons in the National Hockey League (NHL) for the Calgary Flames, Hartford Whalers/Carolina Hurricanes, Philadelphia Flyers and Phoenix Coyotes. He was a second round selection, 38th overall, at the 1984 NHL entry draft and played 1,013 games between 1988 and 2003. Internationally, he played with Team USA; He played in three World Championships and was a member of the bronze medal-winning squad at the 1986 World Junior Ice Hockey Championships.

Ranheim is an alumnus of the University of Wisconsin–Madison Badgers ice hockey program where he played four seasons between 1984 and 1988 and graduated as one of the school's all-time leading scorers. He was a National Collegiate Athletic Association (NCAA) All-American in his senior year and was a finalist for the Hobey Baker Award. In his first professional season, 1988–89 with Calgary's International Hockey League (IHL) affiliate, the Salt Lake Golden Eagles, Ranheim's 68 goals was the fourth-highest total in all of professional hockey that season and earned him the Gary F. Longman Memorial Trophy as the IHL's rookie of the year.

== Playing career ==
=== College ===
Ranheim was born in St. Louis, Missouri, but grew up in Minnesota. He played his high school hockey in Edina, where he captained his team to a state championship in 1983–84 and was named to Minnesota's All-State Team. The Calgary Flames selected him in the second round, 38th overall, at the 1984 NHL entry draft, though Ranhiem opted to play college hockey with the Wisconsin Badgers prior to turning professional. Following a 22-point season in his freshman year of 1984–85, Ranheim won the Badgers' Otto Breitenbach Most Improved Player Award as the team's most improved player in 1985–86 after scoring 17 goals and recording 17 assists in 34 games. He also played with the United States junior team at the 1986 World Junior Ice Hockey Championships where his six goals and three assists helped the Americans win the bronze medal, the first podium finish for the country in World Junior history.

A 57-point season in 1986–87 earned Ranheim honors as he was named to the Western Collegiate Hockey Association (WCHA) Second All-Star Team and to the conference All-Academic Team. He was also named to the preliminary roster of the American entry for the 1988 Winter Olympics. However he failed to make the team, and after contemplating turning professional with the Flames, elected to return to Wisconsin for his senior season in 1987–88. Ranheim shared the team's captaincy with Steve Tuttle, and his 36 goals led the team. He was named a National Collegiate Athletic Association (NCAA) All-American and was placed on the WCHA's All-Tournament Team. Additionally, Ranheim was a finalist for the Hobey Baker Award (won by Robb Stauber) as the top college player in the NCAA. Ranheim graduated from Wisconsin having scored 177 points in 161 games, at the time the ninth best total in school history.

=== Professional ===
Upon turning professional in 1988–89, Ranheim was assigned by the Flames to their International Hockey League (IHL) affiliate, the Salt Lake Golden Eagles. He spent the majority of the season in Salt Lake, but appeared in five games for the Flames, including his NHL debut on December 29, 1988, against the Montreal Canadiens. With the Golden Eagles, Ranheim's 68 goals led the league in scoring, set a franchise record, and was the fourth highest total in all of professional hockey. He was named to the IHL Second All-Star Team and was voted the recipient of the Ken McKenzie Trophy as the U.S. born rookie of the year and the Gary F. Longman Memorial Trophy as overall rookie of the year.

Joining the Flames full-time in 1989–90, Ranheim appeared in all 80 games and scored 26 goals and 54 points. His first NHL goal, and points, came on October 5, 1989, when he scored and recorded two assists against goaltender Glen Hanlon of the Detroit Red Wings. Ranheim was also involved in an NHL record-tying performance on October 17. After Doug Gilmour scored at 19:45 of the third period against the Quebec Nordiques, Ranehim added a goal of his own at 19:49. The goals, both scored short-handed, elevated the Flames into an 8–8 tie. At four seconds apart, Gilmour and Ranheim tied the NHL record (since broken) for fastest two goals by one team, and set the record for fastest two shorthanded goals. Ranheim made his debut with Team USA following the NHL season at the 1990 Men's World Ice Hockey Championships. He scored four goals in seven games for the fourth place Americans.

Ranheim was among the team's leading scorers early in the 1990–91 season when he suffered a broken ankle during a game against the Minnesota North Stars on December 11, 1990, after slipping, then being hit by Minnesota's Chris Dahlquist. He missed 42 games; in 39 games played, Ranehim recorded 30 points and was called for only two minor penalties. Healthy throughout the 1991–92 season, Ranehim finished third on the Flames with 23 goals. He made his second senior international appearance, at the 1992 Men's World Ice Hockey Championships, where he had two goals and an assist in six games.

A 21-goal season followed in 1992–93,; however, head coach Dave King began to convert Ranheim into a defensive forward. Trying to defend against the opposition's top players, he lost confidence in his own offensive game. Ranheim had only 24 points in 66 games when the Flames, struggling to win games and wanting to improve their defence, made a trade. He was sent, along with Gary Suter and Ted Drury, to the Hartford Whalers on March 10, 1994, in exchange for Michael Nylander, Zarley Zalapski and James Patrick. Though he was expected to provide an offensive boost to the Whalers, Ranheim's lack of confidence continued to affect him, and he recorded only three assists in 15 games to end the season.

Despite his early hopes of improving his offense in 1994–95, Ranheim's role continued to become increasingly defensive and focused on penalty killing over time. He finished the lockout-shortened season with six goals and 20 points in 47 games, then scored 30 and 21 points in the following two seasons. He made his third appearance with Team USA at the 1997 Men's World Ice Hockey Championships where he scored two goals in eight games. The Whalers franchise relocated, and Ranheim with it, to become the Carolina Hurricanes in 1997–98. He recorded 14 points, but his value as a defensive specialist earned him a contract extension from the Hurricanes.

Following two additional seasons in Carolina, the Hurricanes dealt Ranheim to the Philadelphia Flyers on May 31, 2000, in exchange for an eighth-round selection at the 2002 NHL entry draft. He played two and a half seasons with the Flyers where he was regarded as "an ultimate team-oriented player". His best season in Philadelphia came in his first year, 2000–01, when he scored 10 goals and 17 points. Midway through the 2002–03 season, the 15-year veteran was again traded. The Flyers sent Ranheim to the Phoenix Coyotes on December 18, 2002, in exchange for a conditional selection at the 2003 NHL entry draft. He reached a career milestone late in the season as he played his 1,000th career game on March 6, 2003, against the St. Louis Blues. Ranheim announced his retirement as a player following the season.

== Personal life ==
Ranheim has two daughters. He originally settled in Arizona following his retirement. Ranheim got into real estate and home building. He left that industry when the economy faltered and embarked on several new ventures. He helped found a technology company called Keyware that creates internet monitoring software then tried marketing a brand of hockey jerseys. He ultimately moved to his hometown of Edina, Minnesota, where Ranheim took up coaching at a local high school and took up a career remodeling community rinks with the goal of starting a home remodeling company.

== Career statistics ==
=== Regular season and playoffs ===
			Regular season					Playoffs
Season	Team	League	GP	G	A	Pts	PIM	GP	G	A	Pts	PIM
1982–83	Edina High School	HS-MN	26	12	25	37	4	—	—	—	—	—
1983–84	Edina High School	HS-MN	26	16	24	40	6	—	—	—	—	—
1984–85	Wisconsin Badgers	WCHA	42	11	11	22	40	—	—	—	—	—
1985–86	Wisconsin Badgers	WCHA	33	17	17	34	34	—	—	—	—	—
1986–87	Wisconsin Badgers	WCHA	42	24	35	59	54	—	—	—	—	—
1987–88	Wisconsin Badgers	WCHA	44	36	26	62	63	—	—	—	—	—
1988–89	Salt Lake Golden Eagles	IHL	75	68	29	97	16	14	5	5	10	8
1988–89	Calgary Flames	NHL	5	0	0	0	0	—	—	—	—	—
1989–90	Calgary Flames	NHL	80	26	28	54	23	6	1	3	4	2
1990–91	Calgary Flames	NHL	39	14	16	30	4	7	2	2	4	0
1991–92	Calgary Flames	NHL	80	23	20	43	32	—	—	—	—	—
1992–93	Calgary Flames	NHL	83	21	22	43	26	6	0	1	1	0
1993–94	Calgary Flames	NHL	67	10	14	24	20	—	—	—	—	—
1993–94	Hartford Whalers	NHL	15	0	3	3	2	—	—	—	—	—
1994–95	Hartford Whalers	NHL	47	6	14	20	10	—	—	—	—	—
1995–96	Hartford Whalers	NHL	73	10	20	30	14	—	—	—	—	—
1996–97	Hartford Whalers	NHL	67	10	11	21	18	—	—	—	—	—
1997–98	Carolina Hurricanes	NHL	73	5	9	14	28	—	—	—	—	—
1998–99	Carolina Hurricanes	NHL	78	9	10	19	39	6	0	0	0	2
1999–00	Carolina Hurricanes	NHL	79	9	13	22	6	—	—	—	—	—
2000–01	Philadelphia Flyers	NHL	80	10	7	17	14	6	0	2	2	2
2001–02	Philadelphia Flyers	NHL	79	5	4	9	36	5	0	0	0	0
2002–03	Philadelphia Flyers	NHL	28	0	4	4	6	—	—	—	—	—
2002–03	Phoenix Coyotes	NHL	40	3	4	7	10	—	—	—	—	—
NHL totals			1,013	161	199	360	288	36	3	8	11	6

=== International ===
Year	Team	Comp	GP	G	A	Pts	PIM
1986	United States	WJC	7	6	3	9	8
1990	United States	WC	9	4	0	4	6
1992	United States	WC	6	2	1	3	2
1997	United States	WC	8	2	0	2	2
Senior totals			23	8	1	9	10

== Awards and honors ==
Medal record

Representing United States

Men's ice hockey

World Junior Championship
Bronze medal – third place	1986 Canada	

College
Award	Year	Ref.
Otto Breitenbach Most Improved Player Award; Wisconsin team award	1985–86	
WCHA Second team all-star	1986–87	
WCHA All-Academic Team	1986–87	
WCHA First All-Star Team	1987–88	
AHCA West First-Team All-American	1987–88	
WCHA All-Tournament Team	1988	

International Hockey League
Award	Year	Ref.
Gary F. Longman Memorial Trophy; Rookie of the year	1988–89	
Ken McKenzie Trophy; American-born rookie of the year	1988–89	
Second-team all-star	1988–89	
