= Bobby Rousseau =

Canadian ice hockey player (1940–2025)

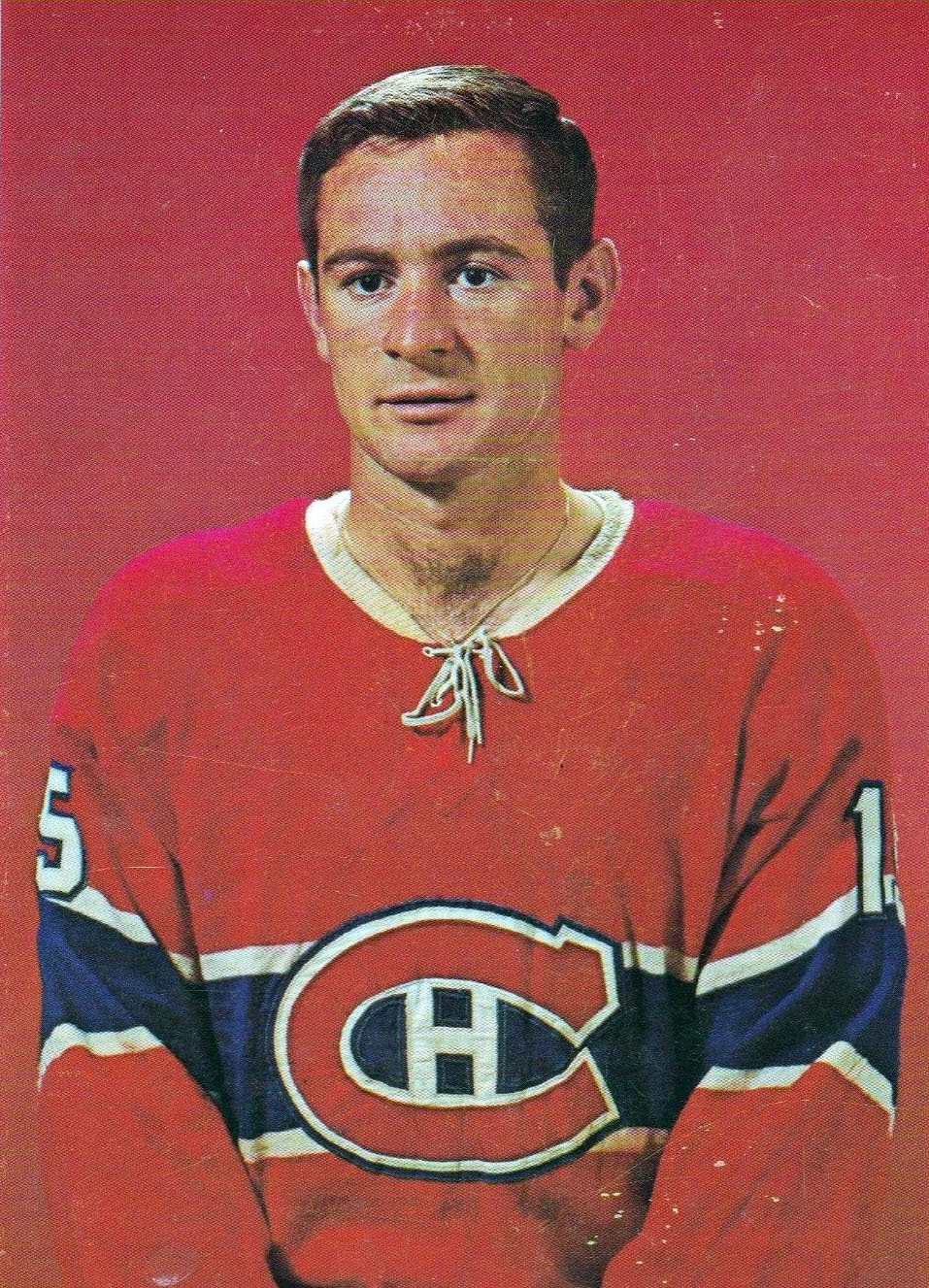
- Rousseau with the Montreal Canadiens, c. 1963
- Born: July 26, 1940 Montreal, Quebec, Canada
- Died: December 13, 2025 (aged 85) Trois-Rivières, Quebec, Canada
- Height: 5 ft 10 in (178 cm)
- Weight: 178 lb (81 kg; 12 st 10 lb)
- Position: Right wing
- Shot: Right
- Played for: Montreal Canadiens; Minnesota North Stars; New York Rangers
- National team: Canada
- Playing career: 1958–1975

Joseph Jean-Paul Robert Rousseau (July 26, 1940 – December 13, 2025) was a Canadian professional ice hockey right winger who played in the National Hockey League (NHL) from 1960 to 1974, most notably for the Montreal Canadiens. He won the Calder Memorial Trophy in 1962 as NHL Rookie of the Year and won the Stanley Cup four times (1965, 1966, 1968, 1969), all with the Canadiens. Prior to turning professional Rousseau played at the 1960 Winter Olympics with the Canadian national team, winning a silver medal.

== Early life ==
Joseph Jean-Paul Robert Rousseau was born in Montreal, Canada on July 26, 1940. He grew up with thirteen siblings, mostly sisters.

== Playing career ==
=== Early career ===
Rousseau started his career with the St. Jean Braves of the Quebec Junior Hockey League in 1955–56 where he led the league in scoring with 53 goals and 85 points in 44 games. The next season, Rousseau moved on with the Hull-Ottawa Canadiens in the Ontario Hockey Association. Hull-Ottawa reached the 1957 Memorial Cup final against the Guelph Biltmores losing game seven 3–2. The Canadiens returned to the Memorial Cup in 1957–58 defeating the Regina Pats in six games.

Olympic medal record

Men's ice hockey

Representing Canada
Silver medal – second place	1960 Squaw Valley	Ice hockey

In 1960, Rousseau was loaned to the Kitchener-Waterloo Dutchmen, the team that represented Canada at the 1960 Winter Olympics in Squaw Valley. Canada finished with a silver medal, while the USA won gold and the Soviets bronze. Rousseau scored 5 goals, 4 of which came in a 19–1 victory over Japan, and 9 points in 7 games during Canada's Olympic run.

=== NHL career ===
In 1960–61, Rousseau earned his first chance in the National Hockey League with the Montreal Canadiens. Rousseau played in 15 games earning three points. During his first full NHL season in 1961–62, he scored 21 goals and 24 assists and was awarded the Calder Memorial Trophy as the top rookie in the NHL that year. Rousseau had a less productive season in 1962–63 as he scored 37 points. In 1963–64, Rousseau scored 25 goals and 56 points. Rousseau also had a five-goal game against the Detroit Red Wings on February 1, 1964. The Canadiens reached the Stanley Cup Final in 1964–65 against the Chicago Black Hawks. The series went to seven games, which the Canadiens won, giving Rousseau the Stanley Cup for the first time. Rousseau was also invited to the 1965 All-Star Game. During the 1965-66 NHL season, Rousseau's 78 points tied him with Stan Mikita for second overall in the scoring race. His hard work earned him a spot on the NHL Second All-Star Team that season. Rousseau helped the Canadiens defend their Stanley Cup title as they beat the Detroit Red Wings in six games. The Canadiens returned to the Final for a third straight time in 1966–67 but lost to the Toronto Maple Leafs in six games. However, Rousseau and the Canadiens won the Stanley Cup the following two seasons.

After the 1969–70 season, his ninth with the Canadiens, during which he scored 24 goals, Rousseau was traded to the Minnesota North Stars where he spent the 1970–71 season. He was then traded to the New York Rangers in exchange for right winger Bob Nevin and helped the Rangers reach the Stanley Cup Final in 1971–72 which the Rangers lost in six games to the Boston Bruins, with Rousseau amassing 17 points during the playoff run. Rousseau played eigh games in 1974–75 but stopped in December 1974 to have spinal fusion surgery; the operation led to him retiring in August 1975.

== Personal life and death ==
Rousseau was the brother of NHL players Rollie and Guy Rousseau. He was married to Huguette. They had three children, a daughter and two sons. Later in life, Rousseau began suffering from Alzheimer's disease. He died at a hospital in Trois-Rivières, Quebec, on December 13, 2025, at the age of 85.

== Awards and achievements ==
- Memorial Cup champion: 1958 (with the Hull-Ottawa Canadiens)
- EPHL First All-Star Team: 1961
- Calder Memorial Trophy: 1962
- NHL All-Star Games: 1965, 1967, 1969
- NHL Second All-Star Team: 1966
- Stanley Cup champion: 1965, 1966, 1968, 1969 (with the Montreal Canadiens)
- On February 1, 1964, Rousseau scored five goals in one game.

== Career statistics ==
=== Regular season and playoffs ===
			Regular season					Playoffs
Season	Team	League	GP	G	A	Pts	PIM	GP	G	A	Pts	PIM
1955–56	St. Jean Braves	QJHL	44	53	32	85	25	—	—	—	—	—
1956–57	Hull-Ottawa Canadiens	OHA	28	7	15	22	18	—	—	—	—	—
1956–57	Hull-Ottawa Canadiens	EOHL	15	4	2	6	2	—	—	—	—	—
1956–57	Hull-Ottawa Canadiens	M-Cup	—	—	—	—	—	8	7	4	11	8
1957–58	Hull-Ottawa Canadiens	OHA	27	24	27	51	64	—	—	—	—	—
1957–58	Hull-Ottawa Canadiens	EOHL	36	26	26	52	14	—	—	—	—	—
1957–58	Hull-Ottawa Canadiens	M-Cup	—	—	—	—	—	13	7	17	24	6
1958–59	Hull-Ottawa Canadiens	EOHL	18	7	18	25	26	3	1	1	2	2
1958–59	Hull-Ottawa Canadiens	M-Cup	—	—	—	—	—	9	2	6	8	19
1958–59	Rochester Americans	AHL	2	0	0	0	0	—	—	—	—	—
1959–60	Hull-Ottawa Canadiens	EPHL	4	4	2	6	4	—	—	—	—	—
1959–60	Brockville Jr. Canadiens	M-Cup	—	—	—	—	—	13	14	9	23	14
1960–61	Montreal Canadiens	NHL	15	1	2	3	4	—	—	—	—	—
1960–61	Hull-Ottawa Canadiens	EPHL	38	34	26	60	18	14	12	7	19	10
1961–62	Montreal Canadiens	NHL	70	21	24	45	26	6	0	2	2	0
1962–63	Montreal Canadiens	NHL	62	19	18	37	15	5	0	1	1	2
1963–64	Montreal Canadiens	NHL	70	25	31	56	32	7	1	1	2	2
1964–65	Montreal Canadiens	NHL	66	12	35	47	26	13	5	8	13	24
1965–66	Montreal Canadiens	NHL	70	30	48	78	20	10	4	4	8	6
1966–67	Montreal Canadiens	NHL	68	19	44	63	58	10	1	7	8	4
1967–68	Montreal Canadiens	NHL	74	19	46	65	47	13	2	4	6	8
1968–69	Montreal Canadiens	NHL	76	30	40	70	59	14	3	2	5	8
1969–70	Montreal Canadiens	NHL	72	24	34	58	30	—	—	—	—	—
1970–71	Minnesota North Stars	NHL	63	4	20	24	12	12	2	6	8	0
1971–72	New York Rangers	NHL	78	21	36	57	12	16	6	11	17	7
1972–73	New York Rangers	NHL	78	8	37	45	14	10	2	3	5	4
1973–74	New York Rangers	NHL	72	10	41	51	4	12	1	8	9	4
1974–75	New York Rangers	NHL	8	2	2	4	0	—	—	—	—	—
NHL totals			942	245	458	703	359	128	27	57	84	69

=== International ===
Year	Team	Event	GP	G	A	Pts	PIM
1960	Canada	OLY	7	5	4	9	2
Senior totals			7	5	4	9	1

== See also ==
- List of players with 5 or more goals in an NHL game

Preceded by Dave Keon	Winner of the Calder Memorial Trophy; 1962	Succeeded by Kent Douglas
