= Les Ramsay =

Canadian ice hockey player

- Born: July 1, 1919 Verdun, Quebec, Canada
- Died: September 1, 1990 (aged 71)
- Height: 5 ft 9 in (175 cm)
- Weight: 155 lb (70 kg; 11 st 1 lb)
- Position: Left Wing
- Shot: Left
- Played for: Chicago Black Hawks
- Playing career: 1936–1951

Leslie Arthur Ramsay (July 1, 1919– September 1, 1990) was a Canadian ice hockey player who played eleven games in the National Hockey League with the Chicago Black Hawks during the 1944–45 season. The rest of his career, which lasted from 1936 to 1951, was spent in the minor leagues. He was born in Verdun, Quebec.

== Career statistics ==
=== Regular season and playoffs ===
			Regular season					Playoffs
Season	Team	League	GP	G	A	Pts	PIM	GP	G	A	Pts	PIM
1936–37	Verdun Maple Leafs	QJAHA	11	1	5	6	6	—	—	—	—	—
1936–37	Verdun Maple Leafs	Mtl Sr	4	1	0	1	0	—	—	—	—	—
1937–38	Verdun Maple Leafs	QJAHA	9	2	5	7	12	—	—	—	—	—
1937–38	Verdun Maple Leafs	QSHL	7	3	1	4	2	5	0	1	1	10
1938–39	Verdun Maple Leafs	QJAHA	11	2	10	12	31	3	0	3	3	4
1938–39	Verdun Maple Leafs	QSHL	1	0	0	0	0	—	—	—	—	—
1938–39	Verdun Maple Leafs	M-Cup	—	—	—	—	—	7	6	2	8	6
1939–40	Washington Eagles	EAHL	61	25	52	77	24	3	2	1	3	0
1940–41	Verdun Maple Leafs	QSHL	34	16	23	39	39	—	—	—	—	—
1941–42	Verdun Maple Leafs	QSHL	28	8	12	20	16	6	1	2	3	12
1941–42	Glace Bay Miners	CBSHL	10	7	2	9	38	—	—	—	—	—
1942–43	Ottawa RCAF Flyers	OCHL	18	11	16	27	33	8	8	5	13	2
1943–44	Ottawa Commandos	QSHL	7	2	1	3	8	—	—	—	—	—
1944–45	Chicago Black Hawks	NHL	11	2	2	4	2	—	—	—	—	—
1944–45	Ottawa Commandos	QSHL	9	5	5	10	6	—	—	—	—	—
1945–46	Hull Volants	QSHL	13	2	6	8	8	—	—	—	—	—
1945–46	Lachine Rapides	QPHL	29	4	21	25	20	4	1	2	3	6
1946–47	Lachine Rapides	QPHL	50	22	41	63	44	11	3	4	7	6
1947–48	Moncton Hawks	MMHL	46	20	32	52	21	11	5	3	8	2
1948–49	Moncton Hawks	MMHL	5	2	1	3	2	—	—	—	—	—
1948–49	Glace Bay Miners	CBSHL	3	2	2	4	2	—	—	—	—	—
1948–49	Antigonish Bulldogs	NSAPC	—	—	—	—	—	—	—	—	—	—
1949–50	Plouefe Raftsmen	QIHL	—	—	—	—	—	—	—	—	—	—
1950–51	Saint John Beavers	MMHL	7	5	2	7	9	7	1	2	3	0
QSHL totals			99	36	48	84	79	11	1	3	4	22
NHL totals			11	2	2	4	2	—	—	—	—	—
