= Jake Rathwell =

Canadian ice hockey player

- Born: August 12, 1947 (age 78) Temiscamingue, Quebec, Canada
- Height: 6 ft 0 in (183 cm)
- Weight: 190 lb (86 kg; 13 st 8 lb)
- Position: Right wing
- Shot: Left
- Played for: Boston Bruins
- Playing career: 1968–1975

John Donald "Jake" Rathwell (born August 12, 1947) is a Canadian former professional ice hockey right winger who played in one National Hockey League game for the Boston Bruins during the 1974–75 NHL season, on January 23, 1975 against the Kansas City Scouts. The rest of his career, which lasted from 1968 to 1975, was spent in the minor leagues.

== Career statistics ==
=== Regular season and playoffs ===
			Regular season					Playoffs
Season	Team	League	GP	G	A	Pts	PIM	GP	G	A	Pts	PIM
1966–67	Verdun Maple Leafs	QJHL	—	—	—	—	—	—	—	—	—	—
1966–67	Verdun Maple Leafs	M-Cup	—	—	—	—	—	4	4	1	5	4
1967–68	Kitchener Rangers	OHA	9	0	0	0	7	—	—	—	—	—
1967–68	Peterborough Petes	OHA	14	2	2	4	4	—	—	—	—	—
1967–68	Espanola Screaming Eagles	NOJHA	17	11	11	22	81	—	—	—	—	—
1968–69	Clinton Comets	EHL	72	18	26	44	104	17	5	6	11	30
1969–70	Clinton Comets	EHL	74	56	43	99	151	17	11	12	23	27
1969–70	Iowa Stars	CHL	—	—	—	—	—	3	0	0	0	4
1970–71	Salt Lake Golden Eagles	WHL	71	20	19	39	66	—	—	—	—	—
1971–72	Salt Lake Golden Eagles	WHL	30	5	6	11	20	—	—	—	—	—
1971–72	Portland Buckaroos	WHL	16	8	5	13	17	—	—	—	—	—
1971–72	Cincinnati Swords	AHL	14	6	6	12	4	10	2	2	4	17
1972–73	Cincinnati Swords	AHL	76	27	44	71	78	15	4	8	12	22
1973–74	San Diego Gulls	WHL	37	6	10	16	25	—	—	—	—	—
1973–74	Rochester Americans	AHL	26	5	5	10	24	5	2	2	4	10
1974–75	Boston Bruins	NHL	1	0	0	0	0	—	—	—	—	—
1974–75	Rochester Americans	AHL	68	10	12	22	45	10	2	0	2	4
AHL totals			184	48	67	115	151	40	10	12	22	53
WHL totals			154	39	40	79	128	—	—	—	—	—
NHL totals			1	0	0	0	0	—	—	—	—	—

== See also ==
- List of players who played only one game in the NHL
