= Royal Montreal Hockey Club =

Canadian amateur ice hockey club

The Royal Montreal Hockey Club, also known as the Montreal Royals, was a Canadian amateur ice hockey club formed in Montreal, Quebec, in 1932. It operated various teams in men's junior and senior leagues until 1961. The senior team of the club won the Allan Cup men's championship in 1939 and 1947, and the junior team of 1949 won the Memorial Cup junior men's Canadian championship.

== History ==
The hockey club was founded in 1932, operated by E. S. Hamilton and G. T. Ogilvie. Formed from the Montreal Hockey Club, the senior Royals played in the Quebec Amateur Hockey Association play from 1932–1933, in the Quebec Senior Hockey League from 1944–1953, the Quebec Hockey League from 1953–1959, and the Eastern Professional Hockey League from 1959–1961. The senior Royals won the QSHL championship in 1945 and 1946, and the QHL championship in 1959. The senior Royals won the Allan Cup in 1947.

The junior Royals played in the Quebec Junior Hockey League. The Junior team reached the eastern Canadian championship five times, winning in 1941 and 1949, and finished runners-up in 1933, 1944 and 1945. The junior Royals won the Memorial Cup in 1949, and were finalists in 1941.

When the Royals advanced to the 1941 Memorial Cup semifinals, Quebec Amateur Hockey Association president Norman Dawe lobbied for games to be played at the Montreal Forum instead of all games in Toronto. The Canadian Amateur Hockey Association voted against his request due to budget constraints and travel costs. In the 1941 Memorial Cup final, the Montreal Royals won both games played on home ice, but failed to win the cup when they lost all three games played in Toronto. In the 1942 Memorial Cup playoffs, the Montreal Royals defeated the Halifax Junior Canadians by a 12–3 score in the first game of a best-of-three series at Montreal Forum. The remainder of series was cancelled due to poor attendance and gate receipts.

== Championships ==
The Allan Cup was the championship trophy for senior hockey overseen by the Canadian Amateur Hockey Association.

The Memorial Cup was the championship trophy for junior hockey overseen by the Canadian Amateur Hockey Association.

- 1939, 1947 – Allan Cup champions
- 1945, 1946, 1947 – Quebec Senior Hockey League
- 1949 – Memorial Cup champions
- 1959 – Quebec Hockey League

== Season-by-season results ==
Season-by-season results for the Montreal Royals senior hockey team.

- 1932–1941: Montreal Senior Group, (QAHA)
- 1941–1953: Quebec Senior Hockey League (QSHL)
- 1953–1959 : Quebec Hockey League (QHL)
- 1959–1961 : Eastern Professional Hockey League (EPHL)

Season	Games	Won	Lost	Tied	Points	Pct %	Goals for	Goals against
1935–36	22	14	4	4	36†	0.778	93	61
1936–37	22	17	3	2	36†	0.850	99	51
1937–38	22	8	11	3	22†	0.420	61	63
1938–39	22	12	4	6	34†	0.750	76	51
1939–40	30	13	8	9	35	0.619	119	91
1940–41	35	21	12	2	44	0.636	151	113
1942–43	34	11	18	5	27	0.379	114	145
1943–44	15	7	6	2	22†	0.538	80	76
1944–45	24	18	5	1	37	0.771	161	98
1945–46	40	30	8	2	62	0.775	209	131
1946–47	40	25	13	2	52	0.650	173	124
1947–48	48	34	14	0	68	0.708	241	159
1948–49	59	35	19	5	77	0.636	216	178
1949–50	60	27	24	9	63	0.525	206	188
1950–51	60	28	29	3	59	0.492	200	203
1951–52	60	30	24	6	66	0.550	219	204
1952–53	60	32	22	6	70	0.583	201	162
1953–54	72	40	25	7	87	0.604	257	203
1954–55	62	30	28	4	63	0.516	232	207
1955–56	64	34	23	7	75	0.586	192	162
1956–57	68	28	34	6	62	0.456	191	211
1957–58	64	29	30	5	63	0.492	227	219
1958–59	62	34	22	6	74	0.597	206	162
1959–60	70	30	26	14	74	0.529	215	198
1960–61	70	19	37	14	52	0.371	167	224

† Team played some four-point games against McGill Source: 1935–38: Ottawa Citizen, 1942–43: Ottawa Citizen, 1943–44: Ottawa Citizen
