= List of NHL players (M) =

This National Hockey League (NHL) players who have played at least one game in the NHL from 1917 to present and have a last name that starts with "M".

List updated as of the 2018–19 NHL season.

== Maa–Mal ==
- Olli Maatta
- Al MacAdam
- Clarke MacArthur
- Matias Maccelli
- Kurtis MacDermid
- Lane MacDermid
- Paul MacDermid
- Blair MacDonald
- Brett MacDonald
- Craig MacDonald
- Doug MacDonald
- James "Kilby" MacDonald
- Jacob MacDonald
- Jason MacDonald
- Joey MacDonald
- Kevin MacDonald
- Lowell MacDonald
- Parker MacDonald
- Kim MacDougall
- Mackenzie MacEachern
- Shane MacEachern
- Maxime Macenauer
- Zack MacEwen
- Hubert Macey
- Bruce MacGregor
- Randy MacGregor
- Garth MacGuigan
- Spencer Machacek
- Raymond Macias
- Al MacInnis
- Ryan MacInnis
- Ian MacIntosh
- Drew MacIntyre
- Steve MacIntyre
- Don MacIver
- Norm Maciver
- Blair MacKasey
- Calum MacKay
- David MacKay
- Duncan "Mickey" MacKay
- Murdo MacKay
- Fleming Mackell
- Jack Mackell
- Aaron MacKenzie
- Barry MacKenzie
- Bill MacKenzie
- Clarence "Pudge" MacKenzie
- Derek MacKenzie
- Shawn MacKenzie
- Connor Mackey
- David Mackey
- Reg Mackey
- Howard Mackie
- Nathan MacKinnon
- Paul MacKinnon
- Brett MacLean
- Donald MacLean
- John MacLean
- Kyle MacLean
- Paul MacLean
- Rick MacLeish
- Brian MacLellan
- Pat MacLeod
- Bill MacMillan
- Bob MacMillan
- Jeff MacMillan
- John MacMillan
- Al MacNeil
- Bernie MacNeil
- Ian MacNeil
- Jamie Macoun
- Jim "Bud" MacPherson
- Ralph MacSweyn
- Craig MacTavish
- Andrew MacWilliam
- Mike MacWilliam
- John Madden
- Darrin Madeley
- Connie Madigan
- Jeff Madill
- Saku Maenalanen
- Dean Magee
- Darryl Maggs
- Marc Magnan
- Olivier Magnan
- Keith Magnuson
- Kevin Maguire
- Johnny Mahaffey
- Frank Mahovlich
- Pete Mahovlich
- Josh Mahura
- Jacques Mailhot
- Philippe Maillet
- Logan Mailloux
- Adam Mair
- Jim Mair
- Fern Majeau
- Ivan Majesky
- Bruce Major
- Mark Major
- Cale Makar
- Andrey Makarov
- Sergei Makarov
- Mikko Makela
- Ron "Chico" Maki
- Tomi Maki
- Wayne Maki
- Eetu Makiniemi
- Kari Makkonen
- Vladimir Malakhov
- Clint Malarchuk
- James Malatesta
- Tomas Malec
- Beck Malenstyn
- David Maley
- Denis Malgin
- Stewart Malgunas
- Manny Malhotra
- Marek Malik
- Merlin Malinowski
- Sam Malinski
- Evgeni Malkin
- Dean Malkoc
- Troy Mallette
- Olli Malmivaara
- Cliff Malone
- Greg Malone
- Joe Malone
- Ryan Malone
- Sean Malone
- Dan Maloney
- Dave Maloney
- Don Maloney
- Phil Maloney
- Jeff Malott
- Steve Maltais
- Kirk Maltby
- Mikhail Maltsev
- Ray Maluta

== Mam–Maz ==
- Maxim Mamin
- Tom Manastersky
- Mark Mancari
- Felix "Gus" Mancuso
- Kent Manderville
- Dan Mandich
- Kevin Mandolese
- George Maneluk
- Mike Maneluk
- Kris Manery
- Randy Manery
- Andrew Mangiapane
- Cesare Maniago
- Eric Manlow
- Cameron Mann
- Jackie Mann
- Jimmy Mann
- Ken Mann
- Norman Mann
- Rennison "Ren" Manners
- Brandon Manning
- Paul Manning
- Peter Mannino
- Bob Manno
- Dave Manson
- Josh Manson
- Ray Manson
- Anthony Mantha
- Georges Mantha
- Moe Mantha
- Sylvio Mantha
- Justin Mapletoft
- Paul Mara
- Henry "Buddy" Maracle
- Norm Maracle
- Milan Marcetta
- Harold "Mush" March
- Brad Marchand
- Todd Marchant
- Alexei Marchenko
- Kirill Marchenko
- Jonathan Marchessault
- Brian Marchinko
- Bryan Marchment
- Mason Marchment
- Dave Marcinyshyn
- Lou Marcon
- Don Marcotte
- Josef Marha
- Martin Marinčin
- Hector Marini
- John Marino
- Chris Marinucci
- Frank Mario
- John Mariucci
- Masi Marjamaki
- Gord Mark
- John Markell
- Gus Marker
- Ray Markham
- Jussi Markkanen
- Jack Markle
- Andrei Markov
- Danny Markov
- Jack Marks
- John Marks
- Nevin Markwart
- Patrick Marleau
- Mitch Marner
- Cooper Marody
- Daniel Marois
- Jean Marois
- Mario Marois
- Patrick Maroon
- Gilles Marotte
- Mark Marquess
- Brad Marsh
- Gary Marsh
- Peter Marsh
- Bert Marshall
- Don Marshall
- Grant Marshall
- Jason Marshall
- Kevin Marshall
- Paul Marshall
- Willie Marshall
- Mike Marson
- Danick Martel
- Tony Martensson
- Clare Martin
- Craig Martin
- Frank Martin
- Grant Martin
- Hubert "Pit" Martin
- Jack Martin
- Matt Martin (born 1971)
- Matt Martin (born 1989)
- Paul Martin
- Rick Martin
- Ronnie Martin
- Seth Martin
- Spencer Martin
- Terry Martin
- Tom Martin
- Tom R. Martin
- Don Martineau
- Radek Martinek
- Alec Martinez
- Darcy Martini
- Jordan Martinook
- Steve Martins
- Andreas Martinsen
- Emil Martinsen Lilleberg
- Steve Martinson
- Dennis Maruk
- Brandon Mashinter
- Paul Masnick
- Bob Mason
- Charlie Mason
- Chris Mason
- Steve Mason
- George Massecar
- Jamie Masters
- Bill Masterton
- Frank Mathers
- Mike Matheson
- Dwight Mathiasen
- Jim Mathieson
- Marquis Mathieu
- Nikolas Matinpalo
- Jonathan Matsumoto
- Christian Matte
- Joe Matte (born 1893)
- Joe Matte (born 1908)
- Roland Matte
- Stefan Matteau
- Stephane Matteau
- Mike Matteucci
- Auston Matthews
- Shawn Matthias
- Dick Mattiussi
- Markus Mattsson
- Richard Matvichuk
- Johnny Matz
- Greg Mauldin
- Wayne Maxner
- Ben Maxwell
- Brad Maxwell
- Bryan Maxwell
- Kevin Maxwell
- Wally Maxwell
- Alan May
- Brad May
- Darrell May
- Derek Mayer
- Gil Mayer
- Jim Mayer
- Pat Mayer
- Shep Mayer
- Jamal Mayers
- Scott Mayfield
- Gerald Mayhew
- Dysin Mayo
- Maxim Mayorov
- Marek Mazanec
- Eddie Mazur
- Jay Mazur

== Mc ==
- Gary McAdam
- Sam McAdam
- Chris McAllister
- Chris McAlpine
- Dean McAmmond
- Hazen McAndrew
- Ted McAneeley
- Jerome "Jud" McAtee
- Norm McAtee
- Ken McAuley
- Charlie McAvoy
- Andrew McBain
- Jack McBain
- Jamie McBain
- Jason McBain
- Mike McBain
- Wayne McBean
- Cliff McBride
- Jim McBurney
- Bryan McCabe
- Jake McCabe
- Stan McCabe
- Bert McCaffrey
- John McCahill
- Mike McCall
- Dunc McCallum
- Eddie McCalmon
- Jared McCann
- Rick McCann
- Michael McCarron
- Jack McCartan
- Dan McCarthy
- Kevin McCarthy
- Sandy McCarthy
- Steve McCarthy
- Tom McCarthy (born 1893)
- Tom McCarthy (born 1934)
- Tom McCarthy (born 1960)
- Ben McCartney
- Walter McCartney
- Darren McCarty
- Ted McCaskill
- Alyn McCauley
- Rob McClanahan
- Trent McCleary
- Kevin McClelland
- Jay McClement
- Tom McCollum
- Frank McCool
- Bob McCord
- Dennis McCord
- John McCormack
- Cody McCormick
- Max McCormick
- Shawn McCosh
- Ian McCoshen
- Dale McCourt
- Bill McCreary Sr.
- Bill McCreary Jr.
- Keith McCreary
- John McCreedy
- Brad McCrimmon
- Jim McCrimmon
- Bob McCully
- Duke McCurry
- Brian McCutcheon
- Darwin McCutcheon
- Connor McDavid
- Jeff McDill
- Bill McDonagh
- Ryan McDonagh
- Ab McDonald
- Andy McDonald
- Bob McDonald
- Brian McDonald
- Byron "Butch" McDonald
- Colin McDonald
- Gerry McDonald
- Jack McDonald (born 1921)
- Jack McDonald (born 1887)
- Lanny McDonald
- Terry McDonald
- Wilfred "Bucko" McDonald
- Kent McDonell
- Joe McDonnell
- Moylan McDonnell
- Aidan McDonough
- Al McDonough
- Hubie McDonough
- Bill McDougall
- Mike McDougall
- Peter McDuffe
- Shawn McEachern
- Curtis McElhinney
- Jim McElmury
- Evan McEneny
- Mike McEwen
- Jim McFadden
- Don McFadyen
- Dan McFall
- John McFarland
- Gord McFarlane
- Jim McGeough
- Irving McGibbon
- Bob McGill
- Jack McGill (born 1909)
- Jack McGill (born 1921)
- Ryan McGill
- Dan McGillis
- Hugh McGing
- Brock McGinn
- Jamie McGinn
- Tye McGinn
- Brian McGrattan
- Tom McGratton
- Donald "Sandy" McGregor
- Frank "Mickey" McGuire
- Mike McHugh
- Jack McIlhargey
- Dylan McIlrath
- Bert McInenly
- Marty McInnis
- Bruce McIntosh
- Paul McIntosh
- David McIntyre
- Jack McIntyre
- John McIntyre
- Larry McIntyre
- Zane McIntyre
- Nathan McIver
- Doug McKay
- Randy McKay
- Ray McKay
- Ross McKay
- Scott McKay
- Walt McKechnie
- Jay McKee
- Mike McKee
- Greg McKegg
- Ian McKegney
- Tony McKegney
- Alex McKendry
- Mike McKenna
- Sean McKenna
- Steve McKenna
- Don McKenney
- Jim McKenny
- Bill McKenzie
- Brian McKenzie
- Curtis McKenzie
- Jim McKenzie
- John McKenzie
- Roland McKeown
- Steve McKichan
- Andrew McKim
- Alex McKinnon
- Johnny McKinnon
- Hunter McKown
- Murray McLachlan
- Frazer McLaren
- Kyle McLaren
- Steve McLaren
- Marc McLaughlin
- Brett McLean
- Don McLean
- Fred McLean
- Jack McLean
- Jeff McLean
- Kirk McLean
- Kurtis McLean
- John McLellan
- Scott McLellan
- Todd McLellan
- Dave McLelland
- Rollie McLenahan
- Jamie McLennan
- Al McLeod
- Cody McLeod
- Don McLeod
- Jackie McLeod
- Jimmy McLeod
- Michael McLeod
- Dave McLlwain
- Mike McMahon Sr.
- Mike McMahon Jr.
- Bob McManama
- Bobby McMann
- Sammy McManus
- Connor McMichael
- Brandon McMillan
- Carson McMillan
- Sean McMorrow
- Tom McMurchy
- Max McNab
- Peter McNab
- Brayden McNabb
- Sid McNabney
- Gerry McNamara
- Howard McNamara
- George McNaughton
- Gerry McNeil
- Billy McNeill
- Grant McNeill
- Mark McNeill
- Mike McNeill
- Stu McNeill
- Michael McNiven
- George McPhee
- Mike McPhee
- Adam McQuaid
- Basil McRae
- Chris McRae
- Gord McRae
- Ken McRae
- Phil McRae
- Pat McReavy
- Brian McReynolds
- Bryan McSheffrey
- Marty McSorley
- Don McSween
- Jim McTaggart
- Dale McTavish
- Gord McTavish
- Mason McTavish
- Charles "Rabbit" McVeigh
- Jack "Pop" McVicar
- Rob McVicar
- Connor McDavid
- Connor McMichael
- Cole McWard

== Me ==
- Rick Meagher
- Evgeny Medvedev
- Gerry Meehan
- Brent Meeke
- Howie Meeker
- Mike Meeker
- Harry Meeking
- Wade Megan
- Paul Meger
- Jaycob Megna
- Jayson Megna
- Timo Meier
- Ron Meighan
- Barrie Meissner
- Dick Meissner
- Anssi Melametsa
- Dean Melanson
- Rollie Melanson
- Julian Melchiori
- Josef Melichar
- Bjorn Melin
- Roger Melin
- Scott Mellanby
- Tom Mellor
- Alexei Melnichuk
- Gerry Melnyk
- Larry Melnyk
- Eric Meloche
- Gilles Meloche
- Nicolas Meloche
- Barry Melrose
- Hillary "Minnie" Menard
- Howie Menard
- Brennan Menell
- Dawson Mercer
- Justin Mercier
- Vic Mercredi
- Greg Meredith
- Waltteri Merela
- Leevi Merilainen
- Nick Merkley
- Ryan Merkley
- Glenn Merkosky
- Georgii Merkulov
- Dakota Mermis
- William "Smiley" Meronek
- Wayne Merrick
- Horace Merrill
- Jon Merrill
- Michael Mersch
- Jan Mertzig
- Elvis Merzlikins
- Eric Messier
- Joby Messier
- Mark Messier
- Mitch Messier
- Paul Messier
- Andrej Meszaros
- Scott Metcalfe
- Victor Mete
- Marc Methot
- Glen Metropolit
- Don Metz
- Nick Metz
- Carson Meyer
- Freddy Meyer
- Stefan Meyer
- Ben Meyers
- Branislav Mezei

== Mi ==
- Corrado Micalef
- Marc Michaelis
- Milan Michalek
- Zbynek Michalek
- Arthur Michaluk
- John Michaluk
- Alfie Michaud
- Olivier Michaud
- Dave Michayluk
- Joe Micheletti
- Pat Micheletti
- Larry Mickey
- Nick Mickoski
- Max Middendorf
- Lindsay Middlebrook
- Jacob Middleton
- Keaton Middleton
- Rick Middleton
- Kevin Miehm
- Andy Miele
- Antti Miettinen
- Rudy Migay
- Vladimir Mihalik
- Petr Mika
- Ilya Mikheyev
- Alexei Mikhnov
- Stan Mikita
- Bill Mikkelson
- Brendan Mikkelson
- Niko Mikkola
- Jim Mikol
- Oleg Mikulchik
- Sonny Milano
- Mike Milbury
- Hib Milks
- Al Millar
- Craig Millar
- Hugh Millar
- Mike Millar
- Corey Millen
- Greg Millen
- Aaron Miller
- Andrew Miller
- Bill Miller
- Bob Miller
- Brad Miller
- Colin Miller
- Drew Miller
- Earl Miller
- J. T. Miller
- Jack Miller
- Jason Miller
- Jay Miller
- Joe Miller
- K'Andre Miller
- Kelly Miller
- Kevan Miller
- Kevin Miller
- Kip Miller
- Paul Miller
- Perry Miller
- Ryan Miller
- Tom Miller
- Warren Miller
- Norm Milley
- Brad Mills
- Craig Mills
- Duncan Milroy
- Chris Minard
- Mike Minard
- John Miner
- Graham Mink
- Gerry Minor
- Fraser Minten
- Pavel Mintyukov
- Eddie Mio
- Daniil Miromanov
- Andrei Mironov
- Boris Mironov
- Dmitri Mironov
- Ivan Miroshnichenko
- Hunter Miska
- John Miszuk
- Bill "Red" Mitchell
- Bill Mitchell
- Garrett Mitchell
- Herb Mitchell
- Ian Mitchell
- Ivan Mitchell
- Jeff Mitchell
- John Mitchell
- Roy Mitchell
- Torrey Mitchell
- Willie Mitchell
- Zack Mitchell
- Casey Mittelstadt

== Mo–Mr ==
- Mike Modano
- Fredrik Modin
- Jaroslav Modry
- Bill Moe
- Travis Moen
- Lyle Moffat
- Mike Moffat
- Ron Moffat
- Sandy Moger
- Alexander Mogilny
- Mike Moher
- Doug Mohns
- Lloyd Mohns
- Tomas Mojzis
- Carl Mokosak
- John Mokosak
- Lars Molin
- Griffen Molino
- Mike Moller
- Oscar Moller
- Randy Moller
- Mitch Molloy
- Larry Molyneaux
- Sergio Momesso
- Garry Monahan
- Hartland Monahan
- Sean Monahan
- Armand Mondou
- Pierre Mondou
- Michel Mongeau
- Bob Mongrain
- Steve Montador
- Hank Monteith
- Sam Montembeault
- Jim Montgomery
- Brandon Montour
- Al Montoya
- Andy Moog
- Alfie Moore
- Barrie Moore
- Dickie Moore
- Dominic Moore
- Greg Moore
- John Moore
- Mike Moore
- Robbie Moore
- Steve Moore
- Trevor Moore
- Amby Moran
- Brad Moran
- Ian Moran
- David Moravec
- Jayson More
- Ethan Moreau
- Mason Morelli
- Howie Morenz
- Angie Moretto
- Gavin Morgan
- Jason Morgan
- Jeremy Morin
- Pete Morin
- Samuel Morin
- Stephane Morin
- Travis Morin
- David Morisset
- Dave Morissette
- Jean-Guy Morissette
- Joey Mormina
- Marc Moro
- Alexei Morozov
- Bernie Morris
- Derek Morris
- Elwyn "Moe" Morris
- Jon Morris
- Brendan Morrison
- Dave Morrison
- Don Morrison
- Doug Morrison
- Gary Morrison
- George Morrison
- Jim Morrison
- John "Crutchy" Morrison
- Kevin Morrison
- Lew Morrison
- Logan Morrison
- Mark Morrison
- Mike Morrison
- Rod Morrison
- Shaone Morrisonn
- Josh Morrissey
- Brenden Morrow
- Joe Morrow
- Ken Morrow
- Scott Morrow (born 1969)
- Scott Morrow (born 2002)
- Dean Morton
- Gus Mortson
- Ken Mosdell
- J.J. Moser
- Simon Moser
- Bill Mosienko
- David Moss
- Tyler Moss
- Johan Motin
- Morris Mott
- Mike Mottau
- Tyler Motte
- Alex Motter
- Joe Motzko
- Kael Mouillierat
- Matt Moulson
- Jacob Moverare
- Johnny Mowers
- Mark Mowers
- Jim Moxey
- Vojtech Mozik
- Jerome Mrazek
- Petr Mrazek
- Rick Mrozik

== Mu–My ==
- Bill Muckalt
- Marcel Mueller
- Mirco Mueller
- Peter Mueller
- Bryan Muir
- Shakir Mukhamadullin
- Richard Mulhern
- Ryan Mulhern
- Brian Mullen
- Joe Mullen
- Kirk Muller
- Wayne Muloin
- Glenn Mulvenna
- Grant Mulvey
- Paul Mulvey
- Harry Mummery
- Craig Muni
- Adam Munro
- Dunc Munro
- Gerald Munro
- Bob Murdoch (born 1946)
- Bob Murdoch (born 1954)
- Don Murdoch
- Murray Murdoch
- Matt Murley
- Brian Murphy
- Connor Murphy
- Cory Murphy
- Curtis Murphy
- Gord Murphy
- Hal Murphy
- Joe Murphy
- Larry Murphy
- Mike Murphy (born 1950)
- Mike Murphy (born 1989)
- Rob Murphy
- Ron Murphy
- Ryan Murphy
- Trevor Murphy
- Al Murray
- Andrew Murray
- Bob Murray (born 1954)
- Bob Murray (born 1948)
- Brady Murray
- Chris Murray
- Doug Murray
- Garth Murray
- Glen Murray
- Jim Murray
- Ken Murray
- Leo Murray
- Marty Murray
- Matt Murray (born 1994)
- Matt Murray (born 1998)
- Mickey Murray
- Mike Murray
- Pat Murray
- Randy Murray
- Rem Murray
- Rob Murray
- Ryan Murray
- Terry Murray
- Troy Murray
- Jan Mursak
- Dana Murzyn
- David Musil
- Frank Musil
- Jason Muzzatti
- Jake Muzzin
- Hap Myers
- Philippe Myers
- Tyler Myers
- Brantt Myhres
- Vic Myles
- Jarmo Myllys
- Sergei Mylnikov
- Phil Myre
- Anders Myrvold

== See also ==
- hockeydb.com NHL Player List - M
