= Hub Anslow =

Canadian ice hockey player

- Born: March 23, 1926 Pembroke, Ontario, Canada
- Died: July 2, 2006 (aged 80) Ottawa, Ontario, Canada
- Height: 5 ft 11 in (180 cm)
- Weight: 173 lb (78 kg; 12 st 5 lb)
- Position: Left wing
- Shot: Left
- Played for: New York Rangers
- Playing career: 1939–1954

Hubert Wallace Anslow (March 23, 1926 – July 2, 2006) was a Canadian professional ice hockey left winger. He played 2 games in the National Hockey League with the New York Rangers during the 1947–48 season. The rest of his career lasted from 1939 to 1960 and was spent in the minor leagues.

== Career statistics ==
=== Regular season and playoffs ===
			Regular season					Playoffs
Season	Team	League	GP	G	A	Pts	PIM	GP	G	A	Pts	PIM
1939–40	Pembroke Lumber Kings	UOVHL	—	—	—	—	—	4	5	0	5	—
1940–41	Pembroke Dairy	UOVHL	4	4	0	4	—	—	—	—	—	—
1941–42	Pembroke Maple Leafs	UOVHL	—	—	—	—	—	5	6	1	7	—
1942–43	Pembroke All-Stars	UOVHL	—	—	—	—	—	3	4	0	4	—
1943–44	Pembroke All-Stars	UOVHL	—	—	—	—	—	5	7	4	11	—
1945–46	Pembroke Lumber Kings	UOVHL	17	31	14	45	27	3	6	6	12	2
1945–46	Pembroke Lumber Kings	Al-Cup	—	—	—	—	—	9	7	12	19	4
1946–47	New York Rovers	EAHL	49	24	13	37	36	9	1	1	2	5
1947–48	New York Rangers	NHL	2	0	0	0	0	—	—	—	—	—
1947–48	New Haven Ramblers	AHL	3	0	0	0	0	—	—	—	—	—
1947–48	New York Rovers	QSHL	44	22	25	47	49	3	1	4	5	4
1947–48	New York Rovers	EAHL	16	17	15	32	32	—	—	—	—	—
1948–49	Tacoma Rockets	PCHL	66	18	42	60	58	4	0	1	1	0
1949–50	St. Paul Saints	USHL	55	24	24	48	58	—	—	—	—	—
1949–50	New Haven Ramblers	AHL	14	3	3	6	6	—	—	—	—	—
1950–51	Kansas City Royals	USHL	26	5	8	13	18	—	—	—	—	—
1950–51	Calgary Stampeders	WCSHL	16	6	11	17	6	—	—	—	—	—
1951–52	Pembroke Lumber Kings	UOVHL	43	32	42	74	26	11	9	7	16	6
1951–52	Pembroke Lumber Kings	Al-Cup	—	—	—	—	—	13	9	3	12	10
1952–53	Pembroke Lumber Kings	UOVHL	35	22	32	54	32	1	0	1	1	0
1953–54	Hamilton Tigers	OHA Sr	42	17	15	32	56	—	—	—	—	—
1954–55	Pembroke Lumber Kings	UOVHL	48	10	19	29	10	6	0	1	1	4
1955–56	Petawawa Army	UOVHL	5	0	5	5	—	4	0	3	3	—
1958–59	Deep River Daggers	UOVHL	12	3	3	6	—	7	8	4	12	—
1959–60	Pembroke Cleaners	UOVHL	5	2	2	4	0	2	1	1	2	2
NHL totals			2	0	0	0	0	—	—	—	—	—
