= Ronnie Rowe (ice hockey) =

Canadian ice hockey player

- Born: November 30, 1923 Toronto, Ontario, Canada
- Died: July 28, 2005 (aged 81) Atlanta, Georgia, U.S.
- Height: 5 ft 8 in (173 cm)
- Weight: 170 lb (77 kg; 12 st 2 lb)
- Position: Left wing
- Shot: Left
- Played for: New York Rangers
- Playing career: 1943–1957

Ronald Nickolas Rowe (November 30, 1923 – July 28, 2005) was a Canadian professional ice hockey player who played five games in the National Hockey League with the New York Rangers during the 1947–48 season. The rest of his career, which lasted from 1943 to 1957, was spent in various minor and senior leagues.

== Career ==
Rowe played soccer in Toronto and then enjoyed a career as a professional ice hockey player.

Rowe was initially offered a contract by the Toronto Maple Leafs during the 1942-43 season for $2,900 a year and $75 a week while in the minors.

Rowe was recalled by the Rangers during the 1947–48 season. Rowe's NHL career lasted five games, where he scored one assist.

== Death ==
Rowe died on July 28, 2005. He was 81 years old.

== Career statistics ==
=== Regular season and playoffs ===
			Regular season					Playoffs
Season	Team	League	GP	G	A	Pts	PIM	GP	G	A	Pts	PIM
1942–43	Toronto Marlboros	OHA	20	26	21	47	40	3	4	4	8	16
1942–43	Toronto CPR	TIHL	17	16	15	31	17	5	3	8	11	6
1943–44	Montreal Navy	MCHL	8	7	6	13	26	4	3	2	5	19
1943–44	Montreal Canada Car	MCHL	2	1	2	3	0	—	—	—	—	—
1943–44	Montreal Junior Royals	QJAHA	8	6	4	10	19	4	3	4	7	0
1943–44	Montreal Junior Royals	M-Cup	—	—	—	—	—	4	1	0	1	0
1944–45	St. John's Navy	NFLD Sr	6	13	4	17	7	1	1	1	2	0
1945–46	Toronto Tip Tops	TIHL	3	1	2	3	0	—	—	—	—	—
1945–46	Halifax Navy	NSDHL	9	15	7	22	25	3	6	4	10	6
1945–46	Halifax Navy	Al-Cup	—	—	—	—	—	9	16	7	23	36
1946–47	Boston Olympics	EAHL	56	41	40	81	78	7	4	2	6	26
1947–48	New York Rangers	NHL	5	0	1	1	0	—	—	—	—	—
1947–48	St. Paul Saints	USHL	3	0	1	1	0	—	—	—	—	—
1947–48	New York Rovers	QSHL	28	17	17	34	49	2	2	0	2	4
1947–48	New York Rovers	EAHL	14	9	6	15	28	—	—	—	—	—
1948–49	Tacoma Rockets	PCHL	70	30	37	67	105	1	1	0	1	0
1949–50	Tacoma Rockets	PCHL	68	47	44	91	64	5	4	1	5	14
1950–51	Tacoma Rockets	PCHL	70	33	34	67	105	6	2	1	3	12
1951–52	Vancouver Canucks	PCHL	12	1	3	4	22	—	—	—	—	—
1951–52	Sydney Millionaires	MMHL	5	0	0	0	0	—	—	—	—	—
1951–52	Moncton Hawks	MMHL	58	31	31	62	12	—	—	—	—	—
1952–53	Sydney Millionaires	MMHL	70	33	39	72	71	6	2	3	5	10
1953–54	North Bay Trappers	NOHA	15	7	6	13	0	—	—	—	—	—
1953–54	Soo Greyhounds	NOHA	4	0	1	1	0	—	—	—	—	—
1953–54	Pembroke Lumber Kings	NOHA	27	11	9	20	0	4	1	0	1	0
1954–55	Pembroke Lumber Kings	NOHA	15	6	2	8	10	2	0	0	0	0
1955–56	Pembroke Lumber Kings	NOHA	51	16	26	42	6	—	—	—	—	—
1956–57	Pembroke Lumber Kings	EOHL	40	7	11	18	18	—	—	—	—	—
PCHL totals			220	111	118	229	296	12	7	2	9	26
NHL totals			5	0	1	1	0	—	—	—	—	—
