= Doug Stevenson =

Canadian ice hockey player

- Born: April 6, 1924 Regina, Saskatchewan, Canada
- Died: November 9, 1975 (aged 51) Massachusetts, United States
- Height: 5 ft 8 in (173 cm)
- Weight: 170 lb (77 kg; 12 st 2 lb)
- Position: Goaltender
- Caught: Left
- Played for: New York Rangers; Chicago Black Hawks
- Playing career: 1943–1956

Douglas Leonard Stevenson (April 6, 1924 – November 9, 1975) was a Canadian professional ice hockey goaltender who played eight games in the National Hockey League: four with the New York Rangers and four with the Chicago Black Hawks during the 1944–45 and 1945–46 seasons. He spent the majority of his career, which lasted from 1943 to 1956, in the Pacific Coast Hockey League and Western Hockey League).

Unusually, upon Stevenson's NHL debut with the Rangers -- with a heavily depleted roster due to World War II, and with the Rangers' starting goaltender Ken McAuley unable to play because of a knee injury -- on February 12, 1945, against the Montreal Canadiens, he had played earlier in the day for the New York Rovers of the Eastern Amateur Hockey League against the Washington Lions, giving up four goals in a 4-4 tie. Stevenson made 36 saves in a 4-3 loss to the Canadiens.

== Career statistics ==
=== Regular season and playoffs ===
			Regular season								Playoffs
Season	Team	League	GP	W	L	T	MIN	GA	SO	GAA	GP	W	L	MIN	GA	SO	GAA
1941–42	Edmonton Athletic Club	EJrHL	11	—	—	—	660	44	1	4.00	—	—	—	—	—	—	—
1941–42	Edmonton Maple Leafs	M-Cup	—	—	—	—	—	—	—	—	3	1	2	150	20	1	8.00
1943–44	Kingston Frontenacs	OHA Sr	2	1	1	0	130	12	0	5.54	—	—	—	—	—	—	—
1944–45	New York Rangers	NHL	4	0	4	0	240	20	0	5.00	—	—	—	—	—	—	—
1944–45	Chicago Black Hawks	NHL	2	1	1	0	120	7	0	3.50	—	—	—	—	—	—	—
1944–45	New York Rovers	EAHL	20	—	—	—	1200	99	0	4.95	6	—	—	—	—	—	—
1945–46	Chicago Black Hawks	NHL	2	1	1	0	120	12	0	6.00	—	—	—	—	—	—	—
1945–46	Kansas City Pla-Mors	USHL	52	—	—	—	3120	169	2	3.25	—	—	—	—	—	—	—
1945–46	St. Paul Saints	USHL	4	—	—	—	240	13	0	3.25	—	—	—	—	—	—	—
1946–47	St. Paul Saints	USHL	28	—	—	—	1680	114	2	4.07	—	—	—	—	—	—	—
1946–47	New Haven Ramblers	AHL	1	0	0	0	20	1	0	3.00	—	—	—	—	—	—	—
1947–48	St. Paul Saints	USHL	3	1	2	0	180	9	0	3.00	—	—	—	—	—	—	—
1947–48	New Haven Ramblers	AHL	39	18	17	4	2340	154	0	3.95	4	2	2	240	11	0	2.75
1948–49	Tacoma Rockets	PCHL	59	27	27	5	3540	216	0	3.66	6	3	3	384	21	1	3.28
1949–50	Tacoma Rockets	PCHL	70	34	27	9	4200	238	4	3.40	5	2	3	310	12	0	2.32
1950–51	Tacoma Rockets	PCHL	70	27	26	17	4200	219	4	3.12	6	2	4	366	16	1	2.62
1951–52	Tacoma Rockets	PCHL	70	34	25	11	4200	236	1	3.37	7	3	4	452	28	0	3.72
1952–53	Tacoma Rockets	WHL	68	27	29	12	4080	231	4	3.40	—	—	—	—	—	—	—
1952–53	Seattle Bombers	WHL	—	—	—	—	—	—	—	—	1	0	1	60	6	0	6.00
1953–54	Seattle Bombers	WHL	2	0	2	0	120	7	0	3.50	—	—	—	—	—	—	—
1953–54	Kelowna Packers	OSHL	26	—	—	—	1560	91	0	3.50	8	4	4	480	31	0	3.87
1954–55	Saskatoon Quakers	WHL	23	5	14	4	1380	85	2	3.70	—	—	—	—	—	—	—
1954–55	Kamloops Elks	OSHL	8	—	—	—	480	29	0	3.62	—	—	—	—	—	—	—
1954–55	Vancouver Canucks	WHL	1	1	0	0	60	3	0	3.00	—	—	—	—	—	—	—
1954–55	Calgary Stampeders	WHL	32	11	15	6	1920	121	0	3.78	9	4	5	546	25	1	2.75
1955–56	Regina/Brandon Regals	WHL	2	0	2	0	128	8	0	3.75	—	—	—	—	—	—	—
1955–56	Edmonton Flyers	WHL	2	0	1	1	130	9	0	4.15	—	—	—	—	—	—	—
1955–56	Calgary Stampeders	WHL	10	6	4	0	603	39	1	3.88	—	—	—	—	—	—	—
NHL totals			8	2	6	0	480	39	0	4.87	—	—	—	—	—	—	—
