= Harry Bell (ice hockey) =

Canadian ice hockey player

- Born: October 31, 1925 Regina, Saskatchewan, Canada
- Died: August 27, 2009 (aged 83) Phoenix, Arizona, United States
- Height: 5 ft 9 in (175 cm)
- Weight: 170 lb (77 kg; 12 st 2 lb)
- Position: Defence
- Shot: Right
- Played for: New York Rangers
- Playing career: 1943–1953

Herbert Botley "Harry" Bell (October 31, 1925 – August 27, 2009) was a Canadian professional ice hockey defenceman who played in one National Hockey League game for the New York Rangers during the 1946–47 season, on March 23, 1947 against the Chicago Black Hawks. The rest of his career, which lasted from 1943 to 1953, was spent in the minor leagues.

== Career statistics ==
=== Regular season and playoffs ===
			Regular season					Playoffs
Season	Team	League	GP	G	A	Pts	PIM	GP	G	A	Pts	PIM
1943–44	Regina Commandos	S-SSHL	16	4	5	9	8	5	2	0	2	6
1943–44	Regina Commandos	Al-Cup	—	—	—	—	—	10	0	0	0	4
1945–46	New York Rovers	EAHL	35	9	11	20	16	—	—	—	—	—
1946–47	New York Rangers	NHL	1	0	1	1	0	—	—	—	—	—
1946–47	New York Rovers	EAHL	26	6	7	13	8	—	—	—	—	—
1946–47	New Haven Ramblers	AHL	28	3	5	8	10	3	0	1	1	2
1947–48	New Haven Ramblers	AHL	66	10	15	25	61	4	0	0	0	10
1948–49	St. Paul Saints	USHL	60	9	21	30	77	7	1	4	5	2
1949–50	St. Paul Saints	USHL	63	14	15	29	57	3	0	0	0	4
1950–51	Tacoma Rockets	PCHL	62	14	26	40	25	6	0	3	3	2
1951–52	New York Rovers	EAHL	34	11	10	21	28	—	—	—	—	—
1952–53	Regina Capitals	SSHL	31	22	20	42	22	7	7	3	10	24
1952–53	Regina Capitals	Al-Cup	—	—	—	—	—	13	9	5	14	19
USHL totals			123	23	36	59	134	10	1	4	5	6
NHL totals			1	0	1	1	0	—	—	—	—	—

== See also ==
- List of players who played only one game in the NHL
