= Val Delory =

Canadian ice hockey player (1927–2022)

- Born: February 14, 1927 Toronto, Ontario, Canada
- Died: November 5, 2022 (aged 95) Parry Sound, Ontario, Canada
- Height: 5 ft 10 in (178 cm)
- Weight: 160 lb (73 kg; 11 st 6 lb)
- Position: Left wing
- Shot: Left
- Played for: New York Rangers
- Playing career: 1947–1953

Valentine Arthur Delory (February 14, 1927 – November 5, 2022) was a Canadian professional ice hockey left winger who played one game in the National Hockey League, for the New York Rangers during the 1948–49 season on March 13, 1948, against the Montreal Canadiens. The rest of his career, which lasted from 1947 to 1953, was spent in the minor leagues. Delory served with the North York Fire Department for 38 years.

== Career statistics ==
=== Regular season and playoffs ===
			Regular season					Playoffs
Season	Team	League	GP	G	A	Pts	PIM	GP	G	A	Pts	PIM
1944–45	Oshawa Generals	OHA	1	0	0	0	0	—	—	—	—	—
1944–45	Toronto Victory Aircraft	OHA-B	9	7	4	11	4	2	1	0	1	6
1945–46	St. Catharines Falcons	OHA	23	7	15	22	21	4	0	4	4	0
1946–47	Hamilton Szabos	OHA	16	8	6	14	24	—	—	—	—	—
1947–48	New York Rovers	QSHL	39	9	12	21	14	3	1	0	1	0
1947–48	New York Rovers	EAHL	15	8	5	13	6	—	—	—	—	—
1948–49	New York Rangers	NHL	1	0	0	0	0	—	—	—	—	—
1948–49	New York Rovers	QSHL	57	19	34	53	12	—	—	—	—	—
1949–50	St. Paul Saints	USHL	2	0	0	0	0	—	—	—	—	—
1949–50	Tacoma Rockets	PCHL	1	0	0	0	0	—	—	—	—	—
1949–50	New York Rovers	EAHL	47	36	37	73	20	12	7	8	15	18
1950–51	St. Paul Saints	USHL	62	14	18	32	21	—	—	—	—	—
1951–52	Boston Olympics	EAHL	62	32	53	85	16	—	—	—	—	—
1952–53	Troy Uncle Sam's Trojans	EAHL	40	24	37	61	2	—	—	—	—	—
1952–53	Owen Sound Mercurys	OHA	7	1	3	4	2	—	—	—	—	—
EAHL totals			164	100	132	232	44	12	7	8	15	18
NHL totals			1	0	0	0	0	—	—	—	—	—

== See also ==
- List of players who played only one game in the NHL
