= Lloyd Ailsby =

Canadian ice hockey player (1917–2007)

- Born: May 11, 1917 Lac Pelletier, Saskatchewan, Canada
- Died: May 8, 2007 (aged 89) Swift Current, Saskatchewan, Canada
- Height: 5 ft 11 in (180 cm)
- Weight: 194 lb (88 kg; 13 st 12 lb)
- Position: Defence
- Shot: Left
- Played for: New York Rangers
- Playing career: 1936–1958

Harold Lloyd Ailsby (May 11, 1917 – May 8, 2007) was a Canadian ice hockey defenceman and coach. A career minor leaguer, he played three games for the New York Rangers of the National Hockey League (NHL) in the 1951–52 season.

== Playing career ==
Lloyd Ailsby played junior hockey in Moose Jaw, Saskatchewan for the Moose Jaw Canucks in 1934–35, and the following year for the Regina Capitals of the Southern Saskatchewan Senior Hockey League. In 1936, he was first signed by the New York Rangers, and played for their affiliate teams, the New York Rovers and Philadelphia Ramblers for the next few years. With the outbreak of World War II, Ailsby served with the Canadian military, and missed a couple of seasons. After the war, Ailsby joined the St. Paul Saints of the old USHL, and played for them when they won the league championship in 1949. Ailsby was a Second Team All Star every year he played for St. Paul.

In 1951, the Rangers brought him back to the Rovers, and installed him as a playing coach for them. In December 1951, the Rangers called him up, and he played three games for them, wearing number 17, without scoring any points. Ailsby returned to the Rovers, and went on to serve as playing coach in Seattle and later with the Johnstown Jets of the EHL. He was named an EHL First Team All Star in 1957. He returned to the Rovers as a non-playing coach in 1960–61, and was replaced after the season by Rovers defenceman John Muckler, as another playing coach for the newly renamed Long Island Ducks.

== Personal life ==
While in the Rangers organization, Ailsby met Aline Adams, an attendant at Madison Square Garden, and married her in 1941. After his hockey career was over, Ailsby and his family returned to Saskatchewan, where they operated a farm outside of Swift Current. Ailsby remained a hockey fan and supporter, and in 1986 was part of a group of local businessmen instrumental in securing the return of the Swift Current Broncos to the city from Lethbridge. Ailsby was on the Broncos' board of directors when they won the Memorial Cup in 1989.

Ailsby died in 2007, three days before turning 90, and was buried in Swift Current.

== Career statistics ==
=== Regular season and playoffs ===
			Regular season					Playoffs
Season	Team	League	GP	G	A	Pts	PIM	GP	G	A	Pts	PIM
1934–35	Moose Jaw Canucks	S-SJHL	6	3	3	6	0	—	—	—	—	—
1934–35	Moose Jaw Canucks	M-Cup	—	—	—	—	—	6	4	1	5	2
1935–36	Regina Capitals	S-SSHL	16	5	2	7	6	2	0	0	0	0
1936–37	New York Rovers	EAHL	47	11	21	32	0	3	2	7	2
1937–38	New York Rovers	EAHL	56	28	22	50	6	—	—	—	—	—
1938–39	New York Rovers	EAHL	53	17	13	30	38	—	—	—	—	—
1939–40	Philadelphia Ramblers	IAHL	52	11	19	30	24	—	—	—	—	—
1940–41	Philadelphia Ramblers	AHL	56	8	13	21	28	—	—	—	—	—
1941–42	Cornwall Flyers	QSHL	39	9	7	16	20	5	0	1	1	2
1943–44	Moose Jaw Victorias	SSHL	9	3	5	8	0	—	—	—	—	—
1943–44	Ottawa Commandos	QSHL	8	0	2	2	4	3	2	2	4	4
1944–45	Ottawa Senators	QSHL	18	6	8	14	26	2	0	0	0	4
1945–46	St. Paul Saints	USHL	53	4	19	23	23	6	0	3	3	0
1946–47	New Haven Ramblers	AHL	53	4	16	20	36	3	0	2	2	0
1947–48	St. Paul Saints	USHL	65	7	26	33	4	—	—	—	—	—
1948–49	St. Paul Saints	USHL	66	5	32	37	14	7	0	3	3	0
1949–50	St. Paul Saints	USHL	68	5	32	37	32	3	0	3	3	0
1950–51	St. Paul Saints	USHL	47	8	17	25	8	4	0	1	1	4
1951–52	New York Rangers	NHL	3	0	0	0	2	—	—	—	—	—
1951–52	New York Rovers	EAHL	27	1	12	13	14	—	—	—	—	—
1952–53	Seattle Bombers	WHL	61	7	15	22	22	5	1	1	2	0
1953–54	Seattle Bombers	WHL	34	0	5	5	6	—	—	—	—	—
1953–54	Nelson Maple Leafs	WIHL	18	4	12	16	4	8	3	5	8	6
1953–54	Nelson Maple Leafs	Al-Cup	—	—	—	—	—	8	0	3	3	10
1955–56	Johnstown Jets	EHL	36	3	18	21	27	4	0	2	2	2
1956–57	Johnstown Jets	EHL	46	6	23	29	16	6	0	1	1	0
1957–58	Johnstown Jets	EHL	—	—	—	—	—	6	0	1	1	18
USHL totals			299	29	126	155	81	20	0	10	10	4
NHL totals			3	0	0	0	2	—	—	—	—	—

== Coaching statistics ==
				Regular season				Playoffs
Season	Team	League	Type	GC	W	L	T
1951–52	New York Rovers	EAHL	Player-Head	61	25	34	2	—
1952–53	Seattle Bombers	WHL	Player-Head	70	30	32	8	—
1955–56	Johnstown Jets	EHL	Player-Head	64	32	32	0	Lost in round 1
1956–57	Johnstown Jets	EHL	Player-Head	64	31	33	0	Lost in round 1
1957–58	Johnstown Jets	EHL	Head	64	31	30	3	—
1960–61	New York Rovers	EHL	Head	64	18	45	1	—
