= Harold Brown (ice hockey) =

Canadian ice hockey player

- Born: September 14, 1920 Brandon, Manitoba, Canada
- Died: January 12, 1997 (aged 76) Calgary, Alberta, Canada
- Height: 5 ft 10 in (178 cm)
- Weight: 160 lb (73 kg; 11 st 6 lb)
- Position: Right wing
- Shot: Left
- Played for: New York Rangers
- Playing career: 1940–1953

Harold Fraser "Hal" Brown (September 14, 1920 – January 12, 1997) was a Canadian ice hockey right winger. He played 13 games in the National Hockey League for the New York Rangers during the 1945–46 season. The rest of his career, which lasted from 1940 to 1953, was spent in the minor leagues. He was born in Brandon, Manitoba. Brown served in World War II with the Royal Canadian Navy. He died at his home in Calgary, Alberta in 1997.

== Career statistics ==
=== Regular season and playoffs ===
			Regular season					Playoffs
Season	Team	League	GP	G	A	Pts	PIM	GP	G	A	Pts	PIM
1938–39	Portage Terriers	MJHL	17	5	4	9	4	2	0	0	0	0
1939–40	Portage Terriers	MJHL	3	0	2	2	0	—	—	—	—	—
1939–40	Brandon Elks	MJHL	12	5	1	6	4	3	2	0	2	2
1940–41	Flin Flon Bombers	SSHL	32	25	20	45	12	3	0	1	1	0
1941–42	Flin Flon Bombers	SSHL	32	26	20	46	12	3	2	0	2	4
1942–43	Nanaimo Navy	NNDHL	19	30	11	41	15	2	3	1	4	2
1943–44	Nanaimo Navy	NNDHL	19	30	8	38	6	—	—	—	—	—
1944–45	Calgary Navy	CNDHL	4	1	1	2	2	—	—	—	—	—
1944–45	Seattle Ironmen	PCHL	2	3	0	3	0	1	2	0	2	0
1945–46	New York Rangers	NHL	13	2	1	3	2	—	—	—	—	—
1945–46	St. Paul Saints	USHL	39	20	17	37	4	6	1	2	3	2
1946–47	New Haven Ramblers	AHL	14	8	4	12	0	—	—	—	—	—
1946–47	St. Paul Saints	USHL	48	28	18	46	4	—	—	—	—	—
1947–48	St. Paul Saints	USHL	66	43	24	67	10	—	—	—	—	—
1948–49	St. Paul Saints	USHL	65	38	39	77	8	7	6	2	8	0
1949–50	St. Paul Saints	USHL	70	30	24	54	16	3	1	1	2	0
1950–51	Denver Falcons	USHL	56	16	17	33	2	5	2	0	2	0
1951–52	Calgary Stampeders	PCHL	32	20	8	28	2	—	—	—	—	—
1951–52	Kamloops Elks	OSHL	27	16	15	31	24	—	—	—	—	—
1952–53	Calgary Stampeders	WHL	19	5	4	9	0	—	—	—	—	—
1953–53	Kamloops Elks	OSHL	27	18	11	29	0	12	3	1	4	0
USHL totals			344	175	139	314	44	21	10	5	15	2
NHL totals			13	2	1	3	2	—	—	—	—	—
