= Bing Juckes =

Canadian ice hockey player

- Born: June 14, 1926; Hamiota, Manitoba, Canada
- Died: December 31, 1990 (aged 64)
- Height: 5 ft 10 in (178 cm)
- Weight: 165 lb (75 kg; 11 st 11 lb)
- Position: Left wing
- Shot: Left
- Played for: New York Rangers
- Playing career: 1945–1955

Winston Bryan "Bing" Juckes (born June 14, 1926 – December 31, 1990) was a Canadian ice hockey player. He played 16 games in the National Hockey League with the New York Rangers during the 1947–48 and 1949–50 seasons. The rest of his career, which lasted from 1945 to 1955, was spent in the minor leagues.

== Career statistics ==
=== Regular season and playoffs ===
			Regular season					Playoffs
Season	Team	League	GP	G	A	Pts	PIM	GP	G	A	Pts	PIM
1942–43	St. James Monarchs	MJHL	1	1	0	1	0	1	0	0	0	0
1943–44	St. Catharines Falcons	OHA	19	7	5	12	17	4	0	0	0	2
1944–45	Winnipeg Rangers	MJHL	3	5	0	5	12	3	5	1	6	8
1944–45	Winnipeg HCMS Chipewas	WNDHL	9	4	5	9	15	6	3	1	4	14
1945–46	Brandon Elks	MJHL	10	23	16	39	31	7	16	4	20	19
1945–46	Providence Reds	AHL	5	1	1	2	6	—	—	—	—	—
1946–47	Lethbridge Maple Leafs	WCSHL	34	31	9	40	47	4	3	1	4	0
1947–48	New York Rangers	NHL	2	0	0	0	0	—	—	—	—	—
1947–48	New Haven Ramblers	AHL	55	27	19	46	18	2	1	0	1	4
1948–49	St. Paul Saints	USHL	65	40	44	84	53	7	2	4	6	20
1949–50	New York Rangers	NHL	14	2	1	3	6	—	—	—	—	—
1949–50	New Haven Ramblers	AHL	46	5	12	17	16	—	—	—	—	—
1950–51	Denver Falcons	USHL	58	25	21	46	56	5	1	2	3	2
1951–52	Calgary Stampeders	PCHL	33	12	18	30	16	—	—	—	—	—
1952–53	Yorkton Legionnaires	SSHL	20	9	9	18	23	—	—	—	—	—
1953–54	Vernon Vipers	OSHL	30	29	16	45	29	—	—	—	—	—
1954–55	Brandon Regals	MHL	3	2	4	6	6	—	—	—	—	—
AHL totals			106	33	32	65	40	2	1	0	1	4
USHL totals			123	65	65	130	109	12	3	6	9	22
NHL totals			16	2	1	3	6	—	—	—	—	—
