= Scotty Cameron (ice hockey) =

Canadian ice hockey player (1921–1993)

- Born: November 5, 1921 Prince Albert, Saskatchewan, Canada
- Died: April 12, 1993 (aged 71)
- Height: 6 ft 2 in (188 cm)
- Weight: 165 lb (75 kg; 11 st 11 lb)
- Position: Centre
- Shot: Left
- Played for: New York Rangers
- Playing career: 1940–1951

Scott Angus Cameron (November 5, 1921 – April 12, 1993) was a Canadian professional ice hockey player. He played 35 games for the New York Rangers of the National Hockey League during the 1942–43 season. The rest of his career, which lasted from 1940 to 1951, was spent in the minor leagues.. He was born in Prince Albert, Saskatchewan.

On June 27, 1941, Cameron was claimed by the New York Rangers from Philadelphia (AHA) in the Inter-League Draft.

== Career statistics ==
=== Regular season and playoffs ===
			Regular season					Playoffs
Season	Team	League	GP	G	A	Pts	PIM	GP	G	A	Pts	PIM
1939–40	Regina Abbotts	S-SJHL	11	6	5	11	16	2	4	1	5	4
1939–40	Regina Abbotts	M-Cup	—	—	—	—	—	6	2	1	3	6
1940–41	Regina Rangers	N-SSHL	32	20	20	40	9	8	3	5	8	8
1940–41	Regina Rangers	Al-Cup	—	—	—	—	—	14	5	8	13	0
1941–42	New York Rovers	EAHL	6	0	0	0	0	—	—	—	—	—
1942–43	New York Rangers	NHL	35	8	11	19	0	—	—	—	—	—
1942–43	Montreal RCAF	QSHL	—	—	—	—	—	2	0	2	2	0
1943–44	Montreal Canada Car	MCHL	5	3	1	4	0	—	—	—	—	—
1943–44	Montreal RCAF	QSHL	4	0	0	0	2	—	—	—	—	—
1946–47	New Haven Ramblers	AHL	64	11	18	29	16	3	0	1	1	0
1947–48	New Haven Ramblers	AHL	64	13	23	36	6	3	0	1	1	0
1948–49	St. Paul Saints	USHL	57	14	30	44	6	7	1	6	7	0
1949–50	St. Paul Saints	USHL	70	7	31	38	8	3	0	3	3	2
1950–51	Regina Capitals	WCSHL	9	1	3	4	2	—	—	—	—	—
1950–51	Yorkton Legionnaires	SSHL	19	15	13	28	6	10	4	4	8	8
AHL totals			128	24	41	65	22	6	0	2	2	0
USHL totals			127	21	61	82	14	10	1	9	10	2
NHL totals			35	8	11	19	2	—	—	—	—	—
