= Ray Manson =

Canadian ice hockey player (1926–2004)

- Born: December 3, 1926 Saint Boniface, Manitoba, Canada
- Died: November 10, 2004 (aged 77) Winnipeg, Manitoba, Canada
- Height: 5 ft 11 in (180 cm)
- Weight: 180 lb (82 kg; 12 st 12 lb)
- Position: Left wing
- Shot: Left
- Played for: Boston Bruins; New York Rangers
- Playing career: 1947–1957

Raymond Clifton Manson (December 3, 1926 – November 10, 2004) was a Canadian professional ice hockey player who played one game each for the Boston Bruins and New York Rangers on March 17, 1948 and March 20, 1949, respectively. The rest of his career, which lasted from 1947 to 1957, was spent in various minor leagues.

As a senior ice hockey player, Manson won the 1958 Allan Cup national championship as a member of the Winnipeg Maroons.

== Career statistics ==
=== Regular season and playoffs ===
| | | | Regular season | | | | | Playoffs |
| Season | Team | League | GP | G | A | Pts | PIM | GP | G | A | Pts | PIM |
|---|---|---|---|---|---|---|---|---|---|---|---|---|
| 1943–44 | St. Boniface Canadiens | MJHL | 10 | 8 | 3 | 11 | 2 | 9 | 3 | 3 | 6 | 0 |
| 1944–45 | Winnipeg Esquires | MJHL | 10 | 10 | 5 | 15 | 16 | 6 | 6 | 2 | 8 | 15 |
| 1945–46 | Winnipeg Rangers | MJHL | 10 | 10 | 5 | 15 | 13 | 2 | 1 | 0 | 1 | 2 |
| 1946–47 | Brandon Elks | MJHL | 16 | 22 | 19 | 41 | 10 | 7 | 10 | 2 | 12 | 5 |
| 1947–48 | Boston Bruins | NHL | 1 | 0 | 0 | 0 | 0 | — | — | — | — | — |
| 1947–48 | Boston Olympics | QSHL | 46 | 24 | 22 | 46 | 10 | — | — | — | — | — |
| 1947–48 | Boston Olympics | EAHL | 20 | 20 | 17 | 37 | 6 | — | — | — | — | — |
| 1948–49 | New York Rangers | NHL | 1 | 0 | 1 | 1 | 0 | — | — | — | — | — |
| 1948–49 | New York Rovers | QSHL | 41 | 17 | 13 | 30 | 8 | — | — | — | — | — |
| 1949–50 | New York Ramblers | AHL | 70 | 11 | 15 | 26 | 26 | — | — | — | — | — |
| 1950–51 | New Haven Eagles | AHL | 26 | 9 | 7 | 16 | 2 | — | — | — | — | — |
| 1950–51 | St. Paul Saints | USHL | 41 | 12 | 11 | 23 | 8 | 4 | 1 | 1 | 2 | 7 |
| 1951–52 | Vancouver Canucks | PCHL | 70 | 36 | 32 | 68 | 21 | — | — | — | — | — |
| 1952–53 | Vancouver Canucks | WHL | 69 | 20 | 25 | 45 | 8 | 13 | 6 | 14 | 20 | 0 |
| 1953–54 | Saskatoon Quakers | WHL | 70 | 28 | 42 | 70 | 22 | 6 | 1 | 3 | 4 | 0 |
| 1954–55 | Saskatoon Quakers | WHL | 58 | 27 | 27 | 54 | 2 | — | — | — | — | — |
| 1955–56 | Saskatoon/St. Paul Regals | WHL | 69 | 35 | 28 | 63 | 22 | — | — | — | — | — |
| 1956–57 | Brandon Regals | WHL | 70 | 40 | 43 | 83 | 18 | 8 | 2 | 5 | 7 | 0 |
| 1957–58 | Winnipeg Maroons | Al-Cup | — | — | — | — | — | 13 | 2 | 6 | 8 | 2 |
| WHL totals | | | 336 | 150 | 165 | 315 | 72 | 27 | 9 | 22 | 31 | 0 |
| NHL totals | | | 2 | 0 | 1 | 1 | 0 | — | — | — | — | — |

== Awards and achievements ==
- MJHL Scoring Champion (1947)
- Turnbull Cup MJHL Championship (1947)
- WHL Prairie Division First All-Star Team (1957)
- WHL Championship (1957)
- Honoured Member of the Manitoba Hockey Hall of Fame
