= Bob Kirkpatrick =

Canadian ice hockey player

- Born: December 1, 1915; Regina, Saskatchewan, Canada
- Died: February 20, 1988 (aged 72); Calgary, Alberta, Canada
- Height: 5 ft 10 in (178 cm)
- Weight: 165 lb (75 kg; 11 st 11 lb)
- Position: Centre
- Shot: Left
- Played for: New York Rangers; Earls Court Rangers
- Playing career: 1934–1949

Robert Drynan Kirkpatrick (December 1, 1915 – February 20, 1988) was a Canadian professional ice hockey player, who played 49 games in the National Hockey League with the New York Rangers during the 1942–43 season. The rest of his career, which lasted from 1934 to 1949, was mainly spent in the minor leagues. Kirkpatrick was born in Regina, Saskatchewan, but grew up in Flin Flon, Manitoba.

== Career statistics ==
=== Regular season and playoffs ===
			Regular season					Playoffs
Season	Team	League	GP	G	A	Pts	PIM	GP	G	A	Pts	PIM
1933–34	Regina Pats	S-SJHL	—	—	—	—	—	—	—	—	—	—
1933–34	Regina Pats	M-Cup	—	—	—	—	—	4	1	0	1	4
1934–35	Regina Aces	S-SSHL	19	5	6	11	6	3	0	0	0	4
1935–36	Prince Albert Mintos	S-SSHL	16	13	3	16	23	3	0	2	2	2
1935–36	Prince Albert Mintos	Al-Cup	—	—	—	—	—	6	4	0	4	2
1936–37	Earls Court Rangers	ENL	—	30	21	51	26	—	—	—	—	—
1937–38	Lethbridge Maple Leafs	WKHL	23	23	17	40	16	2	1	2	3	2
1938–39	Lethbridge Maple Leafs	ASHL	31	21	36	57	36	7	7	7	14	7
1938–39	Lethbridge Maple Leafs	Al-Cup	—	—	—	—	—	3	2	3	5	0
1939–40	Lethbridge Maple Leafs	ASHL	22	14	15	29	6	2	0	3	3	0
1940–41	Flin Flon Bombers	SSHL	32	14	10	24	6	3	4	2	6	0
1941–42	New York Rovers	EAHL	59	34	43	77	26	7	4	5	9	5
1942–43	New York Rangers	NHL	49	12	12	24	6	—	—	—	—	—
1943–44	Winnipeg Army	WNDHL	10	6	6	12	4	—	—	—	—	—
1944–45	Winnipeg Army	WNDHL	3	2	1	3	0	—	—	—	—	—
1945–46	St. Paul Saints	USHL	47	14	33	47	2	6	1	3	4	2
1946–47	St. Paul Saints	USHL	52	15	22	37	8	—	—	—	—	—
1947–48	Lethbridge Maple Leafs	WCSHL	43	13	30	43	26	5	1	1	2	0
1948–49	Lethbridge Maple Leafs	WCSHL	48	17	26	43	8	3	1	1	2	4
NHL totals			49	12	12	24	6	—	—	—	—	—
