= Neil Strain =

Canadian ice hockey player

- Born: February 24, 1926; Kenora, Ontario, Canada
- Died: June 6, 1989 (aged 63)
- Height: 5 ft 9 in (175 cm)
- Weight: 165 lb (75 kg; 11 st 11 lb)
- Position: Left wing
- Shot: Left
- Played for: New York Rangers
- Playing career: 1946–1954

Neil Gilbert Strain (February 24, 1926 in Kenora, Ontario – June 6, 1989) was a Canadian ice hockey player who played 52 games in the National Hockey League with the New York Rangers during the 1952–53 season. The rest of his career, which lasted from 1946 to 1954, was spent in the minor leagues.

== Career statistics ==
=== Regular season and playoffs ===
			Regular season					Playoffs
Season	Team	League	GP	G	A	Pts	PIM	GP	G	A	Pts	PIM
1945–46	Portage Terriers	MJHL	10	12	10	22	0	—	—	—	—	—
1946–47	Valleyfield Braves	QSHL	38	13	21	34	18	—	—	—	—	—
1947–48	San Francisco Shamrocks	PCHL	66	21	22	43	36	4	6	1	7	6
1948–49	San Francisco Shamrocks	PCHL	67	29	24	53	42	—	—	—	—	—
1949–50	Cleveland Barons	AHL	4	2	3	5	0	—	—	—	—	—
1949–50	Minneapolis Millers	USHL	37	12	13	25	6	7	2	2	4	2
1950–51	Denver Falcons	USHL	39	10	21	31	10	—	—	—	—	—
1951–52	Saskatoon Quakers	PCHL	69	33	40	73	26	13	5	7	12	0
1952–53	New York Rangers	NHL	52	11	13	24	12	—	—	—	—	—
1952–53	Saskatoon Quakers	WHL	19	9	9	18	0	—	—	—	—	—
1953–54	Edmonton Flyers	WHL	8	1	1	2	0	—	—	—	—	—
PCHL totals			202	83	86	169	104	17	11	8	19	6
NHL totals			52	11	13	24	12	—	—	—	—	—
