= Ian MacIntosh =

Canadian ice hockey player (1927–1993)

- Born: June 10, 1927 Selkirk, Manitoba, Canada
- Died: June 30, 1993 (aged 66) Scottsdale, Arizona, U.S.
- Height: 5 ft 11 in (180 cm)
- Weight: 175 lb (79 kg; 12 st 7 lb)
- Position: Right wing
- Shot: Right
- Played for: New York Rangers
- Playing career: 1945–1957

Ian Ronald "Mickey" MacIntosh (June 10, 1927 – June 30, 1993) was a Canadian professional ice hockey player who played four games in the National Hockey League with the New York Rangers during the 1952–53 season. The rest of his career, which lasted from 1945 to 1957, was spent in the minor leagues.

== Career statistics ==
=== Regular season and playoffs ===
			Regular season					Playoffs
Season	Team	League	GP	G	A	Pts	PIM	GP	G	A	Pts	PIM
1943–44	Winnipeg Rangers	MJHL	10	15	10	25	20	—	—	—	—	—
1943–44	Winnipeg St. James	WJrHL	—	—	—	—	—	6	7	5	12	6
1944–45	Winnipeg Rangers	MJHL	7	8	5	13	5	4	0	5	5	0
1944–45	Winnipeg Navy	WNDHL	2	0	0	0	0	—	—	—	—	—
1945–46	New York Rovers	EAHL	49	13	27	40	14	4	0	3	3	0
1946–47	New York Rovers	EAHL	53	22	23	45	17	9	5	5	10	4
1946–47	New Haven Ramblers	AHL	3	2	0	2	0	—	—	—	—	—
1947–48	New Haven Ramblers	AHL	58	11	13	24	21	3	1	0	1	2
1947–48	New York Rovers	QSHL	3	0	0	0	0	—	—	—	—	—
1948–49	St. Paul Saints	USHL	63	20	26	46	20	7	3	8	11	0
1949–50	St. Paul Saints	USHL	70	35	42	77	33	3	1	2	3	0
1950–51	St. Paul Saints	USHL	64	39	38	77	82	4	1	1	2	2
1951–52	Cincinnati Mohawks	AHL	68	19	25	44	12	7	2	0	2	0
1952–53	New York Rangers	NHL	4	0	0	0	4	—	—	—	—	—
1952–53	Vancouver Canucks	WHL	63	28	31	59	26	9	1	2	3	0
1954–55	Winnipeg Maroons	Exhib	—	—	—	—	—	—	—	—	—	—
1954–55	Winnipeg Maroons	Al-Cup	—	—	—	—	—	5	4	3	7	2
1955–56	Winnipeg Maroons	Al-Cup	—	—	—	—	—	9	8	6	14	8
1956–57	Winnipeg Maroons	Exhib	—	—	—	—	—	—	—	—	—	—
1956–57	Winnipeg Maroons	Al-Cup	—	—	—	—	—	8	1	2	3	2
AHL totals			129	32	38	70	33	10	3	0	3	2
USHL totals			197	94	106	200	135	14	5	11	16	2
NHL totals			4	0	0	0	4	—	—	—	—	—
