= Bob Chrystal =

Canadian ice hockey player (1930–2023)

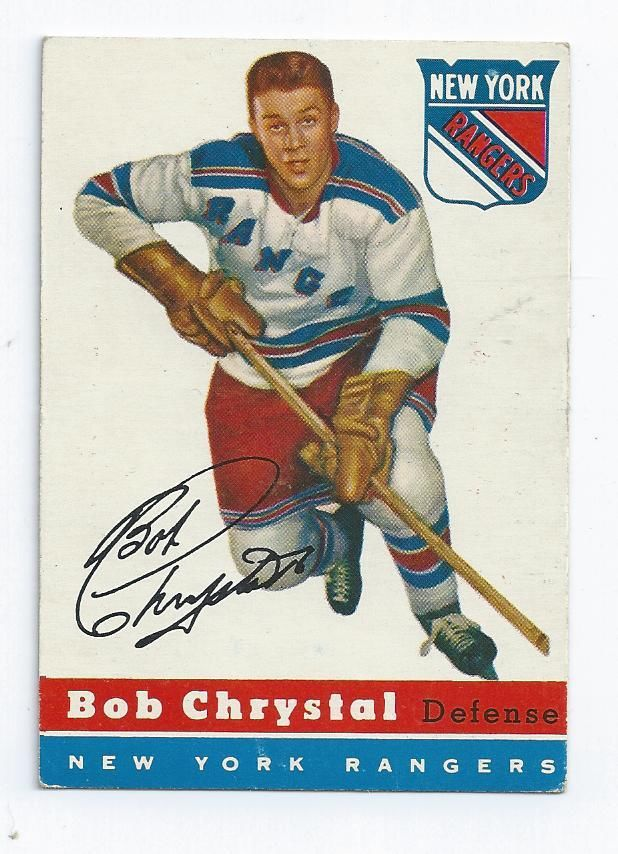
- Born: April 3, 1930 Winnipeg, Manitoba, Canada
- Died: January 27, 2023 (aged 92) Winnipeg, Manitoba, Canada
- Height: 6 ft 0 in (183 cm)
- Weight: 180 lb (82 kg; 12 st 12 lb)
- Position: Defence
- Shot: Left
- Played for: New York Rangers
- Playing career: 1950–1959

Robert Harry Chrystal (April 3, 1930 – January 27, 2023) was a Canadian professional ice hockey defenceman. Chrystal played 132 regular season games for the New York Rangers between 1953 and 1955. He scored 11 goals and 14 assists for 25 points. The rest of his career, which lasted from 1950 to 1959, was spent in the minor leagues. Chrystal died on January 27, 2023, at the age of 92.

== Career statistics ==
=== Regular season and playoffs ===
			Regular season					Playoffs
Season	Team	League	GP	G	A	Pts	PIM	GP	G	A	Pts	PIM
1948–49	Brandon Wheat Kings	MJHL	30	2	10	12	72	7	1	0	1	8
1948–49	Brandon Wheat Kings	M-Cup	—	—	—	—	—	18	4	2	6	49
1949–50	Brandon Wheat Kings	MJHL	36	9	13	22	89	6	3	2	5	6
1949–50	Brandon Wheat Kings	M-Cup	—	—	—	—	—	6	1	2	3	11
1950–51	Denver Falcons	USHL	64	7	13	20	71	5	0	5	5	10
1951–52	Cleveland Barons	AHL	68	3	16	19	109	5	0	0	0	0
1952–53	Cleveland Barons	AHL	63	5	17	22	87	11	4	4	8	24
1953–54	New York Rangers	NHL	64	5	5	10	44	—	—	—	—	—
1954–55	New York Rangers	NHL	68	6	9	15	68	—	—	—	—	—
1955–56	Saskatoon Quakers	WHL	48	5	5	10	67	3	0	2	2	8
1956–57	Brandon Regals	WHL	70	8	20	28	52	9	3	2	5	12
1957–58	Saskatoon Regals/St. Paul Saints	WHL	69	9	23	32	87	—	—	—	—	—
1959–60	Winnipeg Warriors	WHL	59	14	17	31	54	7	0	1	1	7
NHL totals			132	11	14	25	112	—	—	—	—	—

== Awards and achievements ==
- MJHL First All-Star Team (1949 & 1950)
- USHL Second All-Star Team (1951)
- Calder Cup (AHL) Championship (1953)
- WHL Championship (1957)
- WHL Prairie Division First All-Star Team (1957 & 1958)
- Honoured Member of the Manitoba Hockey Hall of Fame
