= Fern Perrault =

Canadian ice hockey player (1927–2021)

- Born: March 31, 1927; Chambly, Quebec, Canada
- Died: September 13, 2021 (aged 94)
- Height: 5 ft 11 in (180 cm)
- Weight: 174 lb (79 kg; 12 st 6 lb)
- Position: Left wing
- Shot: Left
- Played for: New York Rangers
- Playing career: 1946–1960

Joseph Omer Fernand Perrault (March 31, 1927 – September 13, 2021) was a Canadian professional ice hockey player. He played three games in the National Hockey League with the New York Rangers during the 1947–48 and 1949–50 seasons. The rest of his career, which lasted from 1946 to 1960, was spent in the minor leagues. He died in 2021.

== Career statistics ==
=== Regular season and playoffs ===
			Regular season					Playoffs
Season	Team	League	GP	G	A	Pts	PIM	GP	G	A	Pts	PIM
1944–45	Montreal Nationale	QJHL	11	3	2	5	8	—	—	—	—	—
1945–46	Montreal Natioanle	QJHL	20	8	10	18	18	4	3	0	3	4
1946–47	New York Rovers	EAHL	44	11	13	24	15	8	0	0	0	2
1947–48	New York Rangers	NHL	2	0	0	0	0	—	—	—	—	—
1947–48	New York Rovers	QSHL	35	6	17	23	18	4	1	1	2	4
1947–48	New York Rovers	EAHL	21	12	13	25	26	—	—	—	—	—
1948–49	Tacoma Rockets	PCHL	70	37	40	77	67	6	5	2	7	9
1949–50	New York Rangers	NHL	1	0	0	0	0	—	—	—	—	—
1949–50	New Haven Ramblers	AHL	65	25	24	49	23	—	—	—	—	—
1950–51	Cincinnati Mohawks	AHL	70	26	30	56	16	—	—	—	—	—
1951–52	Cleveland Barons	AHL	27	9	14	23	18	—	—	—	—	—
1951–52	Montreal Royals	QSHL	28	7	12	19	14	7	1	2	3	8
1952–53	Chicoutimi Sagueneens	QSHL	45	5	18	23	26	20	9	10	19	18
1953–54	Chicoutimi Sagueneens	QSHL	68	18	41	59	18	7	0	3	3	2
1954–55	Shawinigan Falls Cataractes	QSHL	57	17	37	54	42	12	3	4	7	10
1955–56	Chicoutimi Sagueneens	QSHL	64	17	33	50	46	5	2	1	3	4
1956–57	Chicoutimi Sagueneens	QSHL	67	22	39	61	48	10	8	5	13	8
1957–58	Chicoutimi Sagueneens	QSHL	50	30	23	53	42	6	1	0	1	6
1958–59	Montreal Royals	QSHL	61	25	30	55	34	8	1	5	6	4
1959–60	Montreal Royals	EPHL	30	6	3	9	14	—	—	—	—	—
QSHL totals			398	140	215	355	256	52	18	18	36	38
NHL totals			3	0	0	0	0	—	—	—	—	—
