= Art Michaluk =

Canadian ice hockey player

- Born: May 4, 1923 Canmore, Alberta, Canada
- Died: March 14, 2006 (aged 82) Innisfail, Alberta, Canada
- Height: 6 ft 0 in (183 cm)
- Weight: 180 lb (82 kg; 12 st 12 lb)
- Position: Defence
- Shot: Right
- Played for: Chicago Black Hawks
- Playing career: 1945–1958

Arthur Michaluk (May 4, 1923 – March 14, 2006) was a Canadian professional ice hockey defenceman. He played 5 games in the National Hockey League with the Chicago Black Hawks during the 1947–48 season. The rest of his career, which lasted from 1945 to 1948, was spent in the minor leagues.

Michaluk was born in Canmore, Alberta. Before his hockey career, he served with the Royal Canadian Air Force during the Second World War and later worked for the Calgary Police Service for 23 years. He died of cancer on March 14, 2006. Art was the brother of NHL hockey player John Michaluk.

== Career statistics ==
=== Regular season and playoffs ===
			Regular season					Playoffs
Season	Team	League	GP	G	A	Pts	PIM	GP	G	A	Pts	PIM
1939–40	Canmore Zephyrs	AJHL	9	1	1	2	0	2	0	2	2	2
1942–43	Calgary RCAF	CNDHL	21	3	2	5	24	8	1	1	2	8
1944–45	Calgary RCAF	CNDHL	15	6	3	9	14	3	0	0	0	8
1945–46	Calgary Stampeders	WCSHL	35	5	9	14	24	5	0	1	1	6
1945–46	Calgary Stampeders	Al-Cup	—	—	—	—	—	13	0	2	2	12
1946–47	Calgary Stampeders	WCSHL	39	16	16	32	58	7	2	5	7	15
1946–47	Calgary Stampeders	Al-Cup	—	—	—	—	—	18	1	4	5	16
1947–48	Chicago Black Hawks	NHL	5	0	0	0	0	—	—	—	—	—
1947–48	Pittsburgh Hornets	AHL	1	0	0	0	0	—	—	—	—	—
1947–48	Providence Reds	AHL	39	6	10	16	32	5	1	2	3	2
1948–49	Providence Reds	AHL	65	4	17	21	55	11	1	3	4	6
1949–50	Providence Reds	AHL	67	7	20	27	32	4	1	2	3	2
1950–51	Providence Reds	AHL	70	13	21	34	34	—	—	—	—	—
1951–52	Providence Reds	AHL	62	3	15	18	41	15	0	5	5	8
1952–53	Calgary Stampeders	WHL	70	10	26	36	22	5	0	2	2	8
1953–54	Calgary Stampeders	WHL	68	7	26	33	20	18	1	7	8	8
1954–55	Calgary Stampeders	WHL	70	8	22	30	24	9	0	7	7	10
1954–55	Calgary Stampeders	WHL	70	8	22	30	24	9	0	7	7	10
1955–56	Calgary Stampeders	WHL	54	3	14	17	28	8	0	2	2	6
1956–57	Calgary Stampeders	WHL	51	2	12	14	15	3	0	2	2	2
1957–58	Calgary Stampeders	WHL	17	3	15	18	2	14	0	3	3	6
AHL totals			304	33	83	116	194	35	3	12	15	18
WHL totals			330	33	115	148	111	57	1	23	24	40
NHL totals			5	0	0	0	0	—	—	—	—	—
