= Lloyd Doran =

Canadian ice hockey player

- Born: January 10, 1921 Timmins, Ontario, Canada
- Died: June 15, 1995 (aged 74)
- Height: 6 ft 0 in (183 cm)
- Weight: 175 lb (79 kg; 12 st 7 lb)
- Position: Centre
- Shot: Left
- Played for: Detroit Red Wings
- Playing career: 1941–1951

Lloyd Allen George "Red" Doran (January 10, 1921 – June 15, 1995) was a Canadian ice hockey player who played 24 games in the National Hockey League for the Detroit Red Wings during the 1946–47 season. The rest of his career, which lasted from 1941 to 1951, was spent in various minor leagues. Doran was born in Timmins, Ontario, but grew up in South Porcupine, Ontario.

== Career statistics ==
=== Regular season and playoffs ===
			Regular season					Playoffs
Season	Team	League	GP	G	A	Pts	PIM	GP	G	A	Pts	PIM
1940–41	South Porcupine Porkies	NOJHA	23	9	12	21	28	—	—	—	—	—
1941–42	Omaha Knights	AHA	39	6	18	24	25	8	4	3	7	22
1942–43	Montreal Army	QSHL	30	9	16	25	46	7	2	1	3	10
1943–44	Kingston Army	OHA Sr	11	8	14	22	14	—	—	—	—	—
1946–47	Detroit Red Wings	NHL	23	3	2	5	10	—	—	—	—	—
1946–47	Indianapolis Capitals	AHL	35	9	24	33	77	—	—	—	—	—
1947–48	Indianapolis Capitals	AHL	45	14	21	35	50	—	—	—	—	—
1948–49	St. Louis Flyers	AHL	67	19	55	74	39	7	3	5	8	0
1949–50	St. Louis Flyers	AHL	70	14	42	56	60	2	0	1	1	0
1950–51	St. Louis Flyers	AHL	13	1	2	3	10	—	—	—	—	—
1950–51	Denver Falcons	USHL	12	3	2	5	6	—	—	—	—	—
1950–51	Cleveland Barons	AHL	22	2	9	11	16	—	—	—	—	—
AHL totals			252	59	153	212	252	9	3	6	9	0
NHL totals			23	3	2	5	10	—	—	—	—	—
