= Johnny Holota =

Canadian ice hockey player

- Born: February 25, 1921 Hamilton, Ontario, Canada
- Died: March 10, 1951 (aged 30) Denver, Colorado, U.S.
- Height: 5 ft 6 in (168 cm)
- Weight: 160 lb (73 kg; 11 st 6 lb)
- Position: Center
- Shot: Left
- Played for: Detroit Red Wings
- Playing career: 1941–1951

John Paul Holota (February 25, 1921 – March 10, 1951) was a Canadian ice hockey player who played 15 games in the National Hockey League with the Detroit Red Wings between 1942 and 1945. The rest of his career, which lasted from 1941 to 1951, was spent in various minor leagues. He won the Stanley Cup with the Red Wings in 1943. He died in a car accident in 1951.

== Career statistics ==
=== Regular season and playoffs ===
			Regular season					Playoffs
Season	Team	League	GP	G	A	Pts	PIM	GP	G	A	Pts	PIM
1939–40	Guelph Biltmores	OHA	20	14	14	28	8	3	3	4	7	0
1940–41	Guelph Biltmores	OHA	16	20	21	41	7	5	3	9	12	4
1941–42	Omaha Knights	AHA	48	28	32	60	45	8	7	7	14	2
1942–43	Detroit Red Wings	NHL	12	2	0	2	0	—	—	—	—	—
1942–43	Indianapolis Capitals	AHL	13	8	15	23	5	—	—	—	—	—
1942–43	Toronto Army Shamrocks	TIHL	2	4	2	6	0	4	0	1	1	0
1943–44	Toronto Army Daggers	OHA Sr	1	0	0	0	0	—	—	—	—	—
1943–44	Toronto Army Shamrocks	TIHL	31	30	30	60	25	4	2	6	8	0
1944–45	Toronto Army Shamrocks	TIHL	10	5	7	12	2	—	—	—	—	—
1944–45	Toronto Army Daggers	TNDHL	2	3	4	7	0	—	—	—	—	—
1945–46	Detroit Red Wings	NHL	3	0	0	0	0	—	—	—	—	—
1945–46	Indianapolis Capitals	AHL	34	20	17	37	8	—	—	—	—	—
1945–46	Omaha Knights	USHL	17	17	12	29	2	7	2	3	5	6
1946–47	Cleveland Barons	AHL	64	52	35	87	28	4	1	0	1	0
1947–48	Cleveland Barons	AHL	68	48	38	86	11	9	4	4	8	8
1948–49	Cleveland Barons	AHL	62	34	44	78	12	5	4	1	5	0
1949–50	Cleveland Barons	AHL	44	14	28	42	16	5	3	2	5	5
1950–51	New Haven Eagles	AHL	25	10	9	19	12	—	—	—	—	—
1950–51	Portland Eagles	PCHL	18	6	11	17	0	—	—	—	—	—
1950–51	Denver Falcons	USHL	11	3	4	7	0	—	—	—	—	—
AHL totals			310	186	186	372	92	23	12	7	19	13
NHL totals			15	2	0	2	0	—	—	—	—	—
