= Joe Matte =

Joe Matte may refer to:

- Joe Matte (ice hockey, born 1893) (1893–1961), NHL ice hockey player fl. 1920s
- Joe Matte (ice hockey, born 1908) (1908–1988), NHL ice hockey player fl. 1940s

== See also ==
- Joe Matt, cartoonist
