= Kansas City Cowboys =

Several sports team in Kansas City, Missouri have used the name Cowboys:

- Kansas City Cowboys (Union Association), a major league baseball team in the Union Association in 1884
- Kansas City Cowboys (National League), a major league baseball team in the National League in 1886
- Kansas City Cowboys (American Association), a major league baseball team in the American Association in 1888–89
- Kansas City Cowboys (Western League), an early minor league baseball team
- Kansas City Cowboys (20th century baseball), a 20th-century minor league baseball team
- Kansas City Cowboys (NFL), a 1920s National Football League team
- Kansas City Cowboys (USHL), a minor professional ice hockey team in 1950
