= New Westminster Royals =

- City: New Westminster, British Columbia
- League: PCHA
- Founded: 1911
- Home arena: Denman Arena

Franchise history
- First franchise
- 1912–1914: New Westminster Royals
- 1914–1918: Portland Rosebuds
- Second franchise
- 1945–1991: New Westminster Royals
- 1991–present: Surrey Eagles

Championships
- Stanley Cups: 0
- PCHA championships: 1 (1912)
- PCHL championships: 1 (1950)
- PCHL division titles: 2 (1948–49, 1949–50)

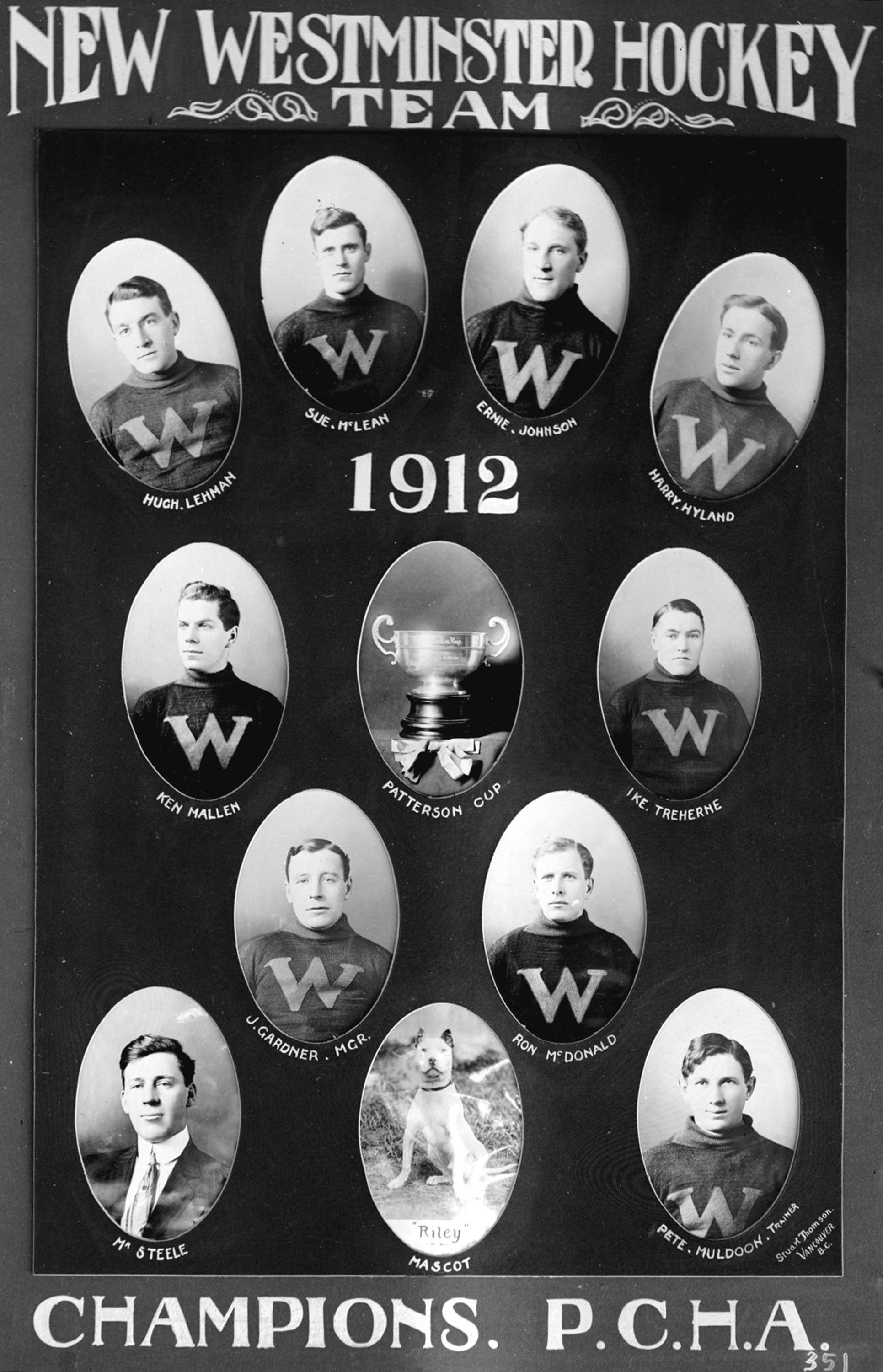
New Westminster Royals in 1912.

The New Westminster Royals was the name of several professional ice hockey teams based in New Westminster, British Columbia, first established in 1911 for the Pacific Coast Hockey Association (PCHA). Though nominally based in New Westminster, the team played its home games at the Denman Arena in nearby Vancouver, as an arena was not available; the team would never play a PCHA home game in New Westminster as a result. They won the inaugural PCHA championship in 1912, though financial difficulties saw the team relocated to Portland, Oregon in 1914 and become the Portland Rosebuds.

== History ==
The first team played from 1911–1914 in the Pacific Coast Hockey Association (PCHA) which was established in 1911. The team was notable as it was the inaugural 1911–12 champion of the PCHA. It would be the only league championship the Royals would earn. Their home arena was the Denman Arena in Vancouver.

The name was revived for a club that played in the Pacific Coast Hockey League from 1945 to 1952 and the Western Hockey League from 1952 to 1959. The Royals won the President's Cup in 1949–1950 as PCHL champions.

=== Junior team ===
The New Westminster Royals name was revived for a junior-level franchise in the Pacific Coast Junior Hockey League (PCJHL) in 1962, winning five-straight PCJHL championships before moving – with league mates Victoria Cougars – into the British Columbia Junior Hockey League (BCJHL) for the 1967–68 season. The Royals played on-and-off from 1962 to 1991 in the years when the major junior New Westminster Bruins were not playing. In 1991, the Royals relocated across the Pattullo Bridge to neighbouring Surrey, changing their name to Surrey Eagles.

== Season-by-season record ==
Key of colors and symbols
Color/symbol	Explanation
†	League champions
↑	Division champions
#	Top record in regular season

W = Wins, L = Losses, T = Ties, GF= Goals For, GA = Goals Against, Pts = Points

=== Senior team ===
Season	League	Division	GP	W	L	T	GF	GA	Pts	Finish	Playoffs
1912	PCHA†	–	15	9#	6	0	78	77	– (Note: The PCHA did not use a point system, and ranked their teams by number of wins. From 1912–1917, the PCHA did not organize playoffs and awarded the league championship to the team with the best regular season record.)	1st†	n/a
1912–13	PCHA	–	15	6	9	0	67	74	–	3rd	n/a
1913–14	PCHA	–	16	7	9	0	80	67	–	2nd	n/a
Team relocated to Portland in 1914. Team re-established in 1945
1945–46	PCHL	North	58	26	32	0	228	268	52	4th	did not qualify
1946–47	PCHL	North	60	29	29	2	257	270	60	4th	Lost First Round v. Seattle Ironmen (1–3)
1947–48	PCHL	North	66	27	38	1	293	322	55	4th	Lost First Round v. Seattle Ironmen (2–3)
1948–49	PCHL	North↑	70	39	26	5	285	229	83#	1st↑	Won First Round v. Portland Eagles (3–0); Won Semi-finals v. Tacoma Rockets (3–0); Lost Final v. San Diego Skyhawks (2–4)
1949–50	PCHL†	North↑	71	36	19	16	291	233	88#	1st↑	Won First Round v. Seattle Ironmen (3–1); Won Semi-finals v. Vancouver Canucks (4–3); Won Final v. Los Angeles Monarchs (4–3)†
1950–51	PCHL	–	70	38	24	8	267	205	84	2nd	Won Semi-finals v. Tacoma Rockets (4–2); Lost Final v. Victoria Cougars (1–4)
1951–52	PCHL	–	70	40	19	11	286	200	91#	1st	Lost First Round v. Victoria Cougars (3–4)
1952–53	WHL	–	70	29	33	8	217	254	66	6th	Lost First Round v. Saskatoon Quakers (3–4)
1953–54	WHL	–	70	28	34	8	218	261	64	6th	Lost First Round v. Vancouver Canucks (2–5)
1954–55	WHL	–	70	29	32	9	249	299	67	5th	did not qualify
1955–56	WHL	Coast	70	31	37	2	238	258	64	3rd	Lost First Round v. Victoria Cougars (0–4)
1956–57	WHL	Coast	70	34	31	5	215	235	73	2nd	Won First Round v. Victoria Cougars (2–1); Won Semi-finals v. Seattle Americans (4–2); Lost Final v. Brandon Regals (0–4)
1957–58	WHL	Coast	70	39	28	3	254	224	81	2nd	Lost First Round v. Seattle Americans (1–3)
1958–59	WHL	Coast	70	23	45	2	237	301	73	5th	did not qualify

=== Junior team ===
Season	League	Division	GP	W	L	T	OTL	GF	GA	Pts	Finish	Playoffs
1962–63	PCJHL	New Westminster Royals PCJHL statistics not available										
1963–64	PCJHL	New Westminster Royals PCJHL statistics not available										
1964–65	PCJHL	New Westminster Royals PCJHL statistics not available										
1965–66	PCJHL	New Westminster Royals PCJHL statistics not available										
1966–67	PCJHL	New Westminster Royals PCJHL statistics not available										
1967–68	BCJHL	–	40	15	23	2	—	186	234	32	5th	did not qualify
1968–69	BCJHL	–	40	10	23	7	—	158	200	27	5th	did not qualify
1969–70	BCJHL	–	48	2	44	2	—	151	320	6	7th	did not qualify
1970–71	BCJHL	Central	60	25	29	6	—	261	270	56	3rd	Lost Quarter-finals v. Centennials (2–4)
1971–72	Dormant during existence of major junior New Westminster Bruins											
1972–73	Dormant during existence of major junior New Westminster Bruins											
1973–74	Dormant during existence of major junior New Westminster Bruins											
1974–75	Dormant during existence of major junior New Westminster Bruins											
1975–76	Dormant during existence of major junior New Westminster Bruins											
1976–77	Dormant during existence of major junior New Westminster Bruins											
1977–78	Dormant during existence of major junior New Westminster Bruins											
1978–79	Dormant during existence of major junior New Westminster Bruins											
1979–80	Dormant during existence of major junior New Westminster Bruins											
1980–81	Dormant during existence of major junior New Westminster Bruins											
1981–82	BCJHL	Coastal↑	48	39	9	0	—	362	196	78	1st↑	Lost Final v. Knights (1–4)
1982–83	BCJHL	Coastal	56	41	14	1	—	363	246	83	2nd	Lost Semi-finals v. Flyers (2–4)
1983–84	Dormant during second iteration of major junior New Westminster Bruins											
1984–85	Dormant during second iteration of major junior New Westminster Bruins											
1985–86	Dormant during second iteration of major junior New Westminster Bruins											
1986–87	Dormant during second iteration of major junior New Westminster Bruins											
1987–88	Dormant during second iteration of major junior New Westminster Bruins											
1988–89	BCJHL	Coastal↑	60	45	14	1	—	458	283	91	1st↑	Lost in Final v. Lakers (1–4)
1989–90	BCJHL†	Coastal↑	59	52	3	4	—	444	181	108	1st↑	Won Final v. Lakers (4–2)†
1990–91	BCJHL	Coastal↑	60	38	21	1	—	310	236	77	1st↑	Lost in Quarterfinals v. Warriors (1–4)
Team relocated to Surrey in 1991.

== Head coaches ==
- Jimmy Gardner (1911–1913)
- Pete Muldoon (1913–1914)

== Players ==
- George Rochon

== Bibliography ==
- Bowlsby, Craig H. (2012), Empire of Ice: The Rise and Fall of the Pacific Coast Hockey Association, 1911–1926, Vancouver: Knights of Winter, ISBN 978-0-9691705-6-3
- Coleman, Charles L. (1966), The Trail of the Stanley Cup, Vol. I, 1893–1926 inc., National Hockey League
- Whitehead, Eric (1980), The Patricks: Hockey's Royal Family, Toronto: Doubleday Canada, ISBN 0-385-15662-6
