= Sherman White =

Sherman White may refer to:

- Sherman White (American football) (born 1948), National Football League player for the Cincinnati Bengals
- Sherman White (basketball) (1928–2011), Long Island University basketball player who was indicted in a point shaving scandal
- Sherman White (ice hockey) (1923–1975), National Hockey League player for the New York Rangers
