= Jack Jackson (ice hockey) =

Canadian ice hockey player

- Born: May 3, 1925 Windsor, Ontario, Canada
- Died: August 8, 2015 (aged 90) Overland Park, Kansas, USA
- Height: 5 ft 10 in (178 cm)
- Weight: 185 lb (84 kg; 13 st 3 lb)
- Position: Defence
- Shot: Right
- Played for: Chicago Black Hawks
- Playing career: 1945–1952

John Alexander "Jack" Jackson (May 3, 1925 — August 8, 2015) was a Canadian professional ice hockey player who played 48 games in the National Hockey League for the Chicago Black Hawks during the 1946–47 season. He was born in Windsor, Ontario.

== Career statistics ==
=== Regular season and playoffs ===
			Regular season					Playoffs
Season	Team	League	GP	G	A	Pts	PIM	GP	G	A	Pts	PIM
1943–44	Stratford Kroehlers	OHA	23	5	11	16	73	—	—	—	—	—
1943–44	Hamilton Majors	OHA Sr.	—	—	—	—	—	2	0	1	1	7
1944–45	Montreal Junior Royals	QJAHA	5	1	2	3	0	3	2	1	3	0
1945–56	Kansas City Pla-Mors	USHL	39	11	11	22	28	12	0	1	1	12
1946–47	Chicago Black Hawks	NHL	48	2	5	7	38	—	—	—	—	—
1946–47	Kansas City Pla-Mors	USHL	15	1	3	4	24	—	—	—	—	—
1947–48	Kansas City Pla-Mors	USHL	66	6	19	25	72	7	0	1	1	0
1948–49	Kansas City Pla-Mors	USHL	66	11	17	28	82	2	1	0	1	0
1949–50	Kansas City Pla-Mors	USHL	70	9	30	39	34	3	0	0	0	0
1950–51	New Haven Eagles	AHL	22	0	2	2	10	—	—	—	—	—
1950–51	Denver Falcons	USHL	28	3	9	12	28	5	1	5	6	20
1951–52	Seattle Ironmen	PCHL	54	6	13	19	72	—	—	—	—	—
USHL totals			284	41	89	130	268	29	2	7	9	32
NHL totals			48	2	5	7	38	—	—	—	—	—
