= George Rochon =

Canadian ice hockey player

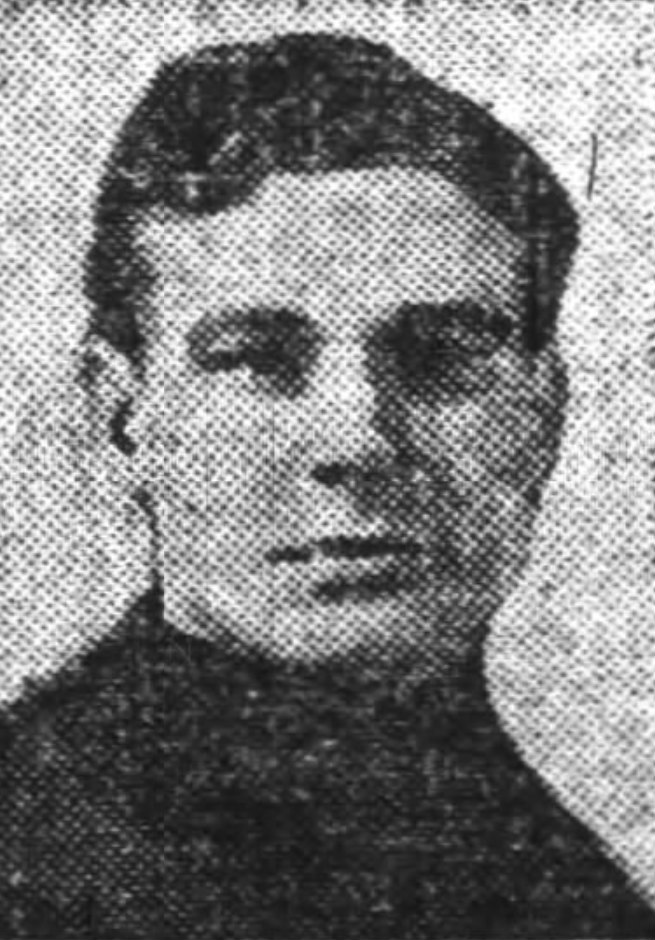
- Rochon with New Westminster Royals
- Born: May 15, 1889 Fort William, Ontario, Canada
- Died: May 2, 1941 (aged 51) Los Angeles, California, USA
- Height: 6 ft 0 in (183 cm)
- Weight: 190 lb (86 kg; 13 st 8 lb)
- Position: Left wing/Defenceman
- Played for: New Westminster Royals
- Playing career: 1909–1914

George Adolphus Rochon (May 15, 1889 – May 2, 1941) was a Canadian professional ice hockey player. He played in the Pacific Coast Hockey Association with the New Westminster Royals from 1912 to 1914. He played left wing and defense.
