= New York Rovers =

Defunct senior ice hockey team from New York City

- Sport: Ice hockey
- Founded: 1935
- Folded: 1952
- League: EHL (1949–1952); QSHL (1948–1949); EHL (1935–1948)
- Location: New York City, New York, USA
- Arena: Madison Square Garden
- Affiliation: New York Rangers
- Championships: 4

The New York Rovers were a senior ice hockey team that was established in 1935. They played in the Eastern Hockey League as a farm team of the New York Rangers. The Rovers played alongside the Rangers in Madison Square Garden. They played in the Eastern League through 1947–48. When the EHL took a break for the 1948–49 season, the Rovers played in the Quebec Senior Hockey League until the EHL resumed for the 1949–50 season. The Rovers folded in 1952 because of a dispute over television rights. The team couldn't sell the rights and could not afford to go on without doing so.

The team name was briefly resurrected in 1959, playing in the Long Island Arena. That Rovers franchise changed its name to the Long Island Ducks in 1961.

One last hurrah for the Rovers was 1964–65 when they played for one season in Madison Square Garden. It was not a financial success.

== Awards ==
- 1936–37: Won Hershey Cup (consolation final).
- 1938–39: Won Hamilton B. Wills Trophy. Won the United States National Senior Hockey Championships.
- 1940–41: Won Hamilton B. Wills Trophy.
- 1941–42: Won Boardwalk Cup (regular season). Won the United States National Senior Hockey Championships.

== Rovers who played in the NHL ==
- Lloyd Ailsby
- Bill Allum
- Lorne Anderson
- Hub Anslow
- Murray Armstrong
- Frank Ashworth
- Harry Bell
- Ken Block
- Frank Boucher
- Andy Branigan
- Hy Buller
- Scotty Cameron
- Lude Check
- Les Colvin
- Maurice Courteau
- Hank D'Amore
- Gordon Davidson
- Bob DeCourcy
- Val Delory
- Jean-Paul Denis
- Connie Dion
- Jim Drummond
- Trevor Fahey
- Herb Foster
- Pierre Gagne
- Cal Gardner
- Ed Giacomin
- Jack Gordon
- Gord Henry
- Dutch Hiller
- Vic Howe
- Steve Hrymnak
- Jim Jamieson
- Bill Johansen
- Bob Kirkpatrick
- Dick Kotanen
- Joe Krol
- Larry Kwong
- Bill Kyle
- Gus Kyle
- Max Labovitch
- Jack Lancien
- Hal Laycoe
- Roger Leger
- Odie Lowe
- Vic Lynn
- Kilby MacDonald
- Hub Macey
- Ian MacIntosh
- Murdo MacKay
- Jack Mann
- Ray Manson
- Robert McDonald
- Hillary Menard
- Nick Mickoski
- Lloyd Mohns
- Jim Murray
- Muzz Patrick
- Fern Perreault
- Brian Perry
- Alf Pike
- Rudy Pilous
- Ray Powell
- Don Raleigh
- George Ranieri
- Al Rollins
- Ronnie Rowe
- Church Russell
- Fred Shero
- Don Smith
- Stanford Smith
- Al Staley
- Doug Stevenson
- Art Strobel
- Spence Tatchell
- Rene Trudell
- Gordon Turlick
- Gilles Villemure
- Bill Warwick
- Phil Watson
- Chick Webster
- Len Wharton
- Sherman White
- Bob Wood
- Gump Worsley
- Bill Wylie
