= Hubert Macey =

Canadian ice hockey player

- Born: April 13, 1921; Big River, Saskatchewan, Canada
- Died: May 27, 2008 (aged 87)
- Height: 5 ft 8 in (173 cm)
- Weight: 176 lb (80 kg; 12 st 8 lb)
- Position: Left wing
- Shot: Left
- Played for: New York Rangers; Montreal Canadiens
- Playing career: 1941–1957

Hubert "Hub" Macey (April 13, 1921 – May 27, 2008) was a Canadian professional ice hockey forward. He played 30 games in the National Hockey League for the New York Rangers and Montreal Canadiens from 1942 to 1947. The rest of his career, which lasted from 1941 to 1957, was spent in the minor leagues.. He was born in Big River, Saskatchewan, but grew up in The Pas, Manitoba.

== Career statistics ==
=== Regular season and playoffs ===
			Regular season					Playoffs
Season A	Team	League	GP	G	A	Pts	PIM	GP	G	A	Pts	PIM
1938–39	Portage Terriers	MJHL	18	12	3	15	12	3	2	2	4	0
1939–40	Portage Terriers	MJHL	21	14	7	21	14	4	2	2	4	0
1940–41	Portage Terriers	MJHL	19	18	10	28	6	6	5	2	7	2
1940–41	Winnipeg Rangers	M-Cup	—	—	—	—	—	10	9	6	15	4
1941–42	New York Rangers	NHL	9	3	5	8	0	1	0	0	0	0
1941–42	New York Rovers	EAHL	47	39	33	72	8	—	—	—	—	—
1942–43	New York Rangers	NHL	9	3	3	6	0	—	—	—	—	—
1942–43	Kingston Frontenacs	OHA Sr	13	13	9	22	24	4	0	5	5	0
1943–44	Kingston Army	OHA Sr	2	2	1	3	2	—	—	—	—	—
1945–46	London Army	StDHL	—	—	—	—	—	—	—	—	—	—
1946–47	Montreal Canadiens	NHL	12	0	1	1	0	7	0	0	0	)
1946–47	Buffalo Bisons	AHL	32	15	16	31	4	—	—	—	—	—
1946–47	Houston Huskies	USHL	9	4	4	8	0	—	—	—	—	—
1947–48	Houston Huskies	USHL	59	31	60	91	8	12	4	5	9	0
1948–49	Houston Huskies	USHL	14	6	9	15	0	—	—	—	—	—
1948–49	Springfield Indians	AHL	43	20	29	49	2	3	0	1	1	0
1949–50	Springfield Indians	AHL	48	10	26	36	2	2	0	1	1	0
1950–51	Vancouver Canucks	PCHL	19	6	5	11	2	—	—	—	—	—
1950–51	Tulsa Oilers	USHL	41	11	27	38	6	6	3	0	3	0
1951–52	Glace Bay Miners	MMHL	71	30	27	57	24	3	0	0	0	0
1952–53	Glace Bay Miners	MMHL	62	22	34	56	10	7	3	1	4	0
1953–54	Sault Ste. Marie Indians	NOHA	21	4	11	15	4	—	—	—	—	—
1955–56	Kingston Goodyears	EOHL	30	20	22	42	4	14	7	13	20	2
1956–57	Kingston CKLCs	EOHL	44	23	28	51	28	5	3	0	3	0
NHL totals			30	6	9	15	0	8	0	0	0	0
