= Gordon Davidson (ice hockey) =

Canadian ice hockey player

- Born: August 5, 1918; Stratton, Ontario, Canada
- Died: August 8, 2004 (aged 86); Buffalo, New York, U.S.
- Height: 5 ft 11 in (180 cm)
- Weight: 188 lb (85 kg; 13 st 6 lb)
- Position: Defenceman
- Shot: Left
- Played for: New York Rangers
- Playing career: 1938–1951

John Gordon Davidson (August 5, 1918 – August 8, 2004) was a Canadian professional ice hockey defenceman. He played 51 games in the National Hockey League for the New York Rangers during the 1942–43 and 1943–44 seasons. The rest of his career, which lasted from 1938 to 1951, was spent in the minor leagues. Davidson was born in Stratton, Ontario, but grew up in Moose Jaw, Saskatchewan. He died in 2004.

== Career statistics ==
=== Regular season and playoffs ===
			Regular season					Playoffs
Season	Team	League	GP	G	A	Pts	PIM	GP	G	A	Pts	PIM
1935–36	Moose Jaw Canucks	S-SJHL	3	1	0	1	2	1	1	1	2	0
1936–37	Moose Jaw Canucks	S-SJHL	5	3	0	3	6	5	1	3	4	6
1937–38	Moose Jaw Canucks	S-SJHL	6	2	4	6	0	7	1	3	4	6
1938–39	Regina Aces	SSHL	27	1	3	4	22	—	—	—	—	—
1939–40	Regina Aces	SSHL	17	1	3	4	23	9	1	0	1	0
1940–41	Regina Rangers	SSHL	32	0	5	5	30	8	0	0	0	6
1940–41	Regina Rangers	Al-Cup	—	—	—	—	—	14	0	2	2	31
1941–42	New York Rovers	EAHL	58	9	31	40	55	7	1	6	7	6
1942–43	New York Rangers	NHL	35	2	3	5	4	—	—	—	—	—
1943–44	New York Rangers	NHL	16	1	3	4	4	—	—	—	—	—
1943–44	Buffalo Bisons	AHL	30	2	15	17	19	9	1	6	7	2
1944–45	Buffalo Bisons	AHL	59	10	20	30	20	6	1	0	1	4
1945–46	New Haven Eagles	AHL	17	1	3	4	16	—	—	—	—	—
1945–46	Cleveland Barons	AHL	43	5	20	25	16	12	1	5	6	4
1946–47	Cleveland Barons	AHL	58	5	10	15	14	4	0	0	0	0
1947–48	Cleveland Barons	AHL	58	2	15	17	16	9	2	2	4	2
1948–49	Cleveland Barons	AHL	62	5	20	25	10	5	0	0	0	0
1949–50	Buffalo Bisons	AHL	67	4	19	23	25	1	0	0	0	0
1950–51	Springfield Indians	AHL	54	5	24	29	10	3	0	1	1	4
AHL totals			448	39	146	185	146	49	5	14	19	16
NHL totals			51	3	6	9	8	—	—	—	—	—
