= Tacoma Ice Palace =

Outdoor arena in Tacoma, Washington

Coordinates: 47.2217°N 122.4827°W

Tacoma Ice Palace was an outdoor arena in Tacoma, Washington at 3801 S. Union Avenue. It hosted the Western Hockey League's Tacoma Rockets in 1952. The arena held 3,816 people. It was originally owned by Reinhold "Reiny" Striech and his wife Bernice "Bernie". His family now owns and operates Striech brothers machine shop on the Tacoma waterfront.
