= Leo Thiffault =

Canadian ice hockey player

- Born: December 16, 1944; Drummondville, Quebec, Canada
- Died: July 1, 2018 (aged 73); Springfield, Massachusetts, U.S.
- Height: 5 ft 10 in (178 cm)
- Weight: 175 lb (79 kg; 12 st 7 lb)
- Position: Left wing
- Shot: Left
- Played for: Minnesota North Stars
- Playing career: 1961–1974

Leo Edmond Thiffault (December 16, 1944 – July 1, 2018) was a Canadian professional ice hockey player who played five games in the National Hockey League with the Minnesota North Stars during the 1967–68 season, all in the playoffs. Thiffault and Sid McNabney are the only players to play five play-off games in the NHL without playing any regular-season games. He died in 2018 at the age of 73.

== Career statistics ==
=== Regular season and playoffs ===
			Regular season					Playoffs
Season	Team	League	GP	G	A	Pts	PIM	GP	G	A	Pts	PIM
1961–62	Montreal Nationale	MMJHL	—	—	—	—	—	—	—	—	—	—
1961–62	Montreal Nationale	M-Cup	—	—	—	—	—	2	0	0	0	8
1962–63	Montreal Junior Canadiens	OHA	50	9	9	18	64	10	1	1	2	2
1963–64	Montreal Junior Canadiens	OHA	55	23	38	61	44	17	7	12	19	22
1964–65	Peterborough TPTs	OHA	53	33	52	85	52	12	4	10	14	8
1964–65	Quebec Aces	AHL	2	0	0	0	0	—	—	—	—	—
1965–66	Houston Apollos	CHL	69	19	26	45	55	—	—	—	—	—
1966–67	Houston Apollos	CHL	47	7	15	22	37	2	0	0	0	0
1966–67	Cleveland Barons	AHL	5	1	1	2	4	—	—	—	—	—
1967–68	Memphis South Stars	CHL	66	22	32	54	52	3	0	1	1	6
1967–68	Minnesota North Stars	NHL	—	—	—	—	—	5	0	0	0	0
1968–69	Phoenix Roadrunners	WHL	70	16	24	40	25	—	—	—	—	—
1972–73	Phoenix Roadrunners	WHL	70	12	35	47	57	5	1	0	1	5
1973–74	Tulsa Oilers	CHL	1	0	1	1	0	—	—	—	—	—
1973–74	Phoenix Roadrunners	WHL	35	5	6	11	26	2	0	0	0	0
CHL totals			182	48	73	121	144	5	0	1	1	6
WHL totals			175	33	65	98	108	7	1	0	1	5
NHL totals			—	—	—	—	—	5	0	0	0	0
