= John Michaluk =

Canadian ice hockey player

- Born: November 2, 1928; Canmore, Alberta, Canada
- Died: December 18, 1998 (aged 70); Calgary, Alberta, Canada
- Height: 5 ft 10 in (178 cm)
- Weight: 155 lb (70 kg; 11 st 1 lb)
- Position: Left wing
- Shot: Left
- Played for: Chicago Black Hawks
- Playing career: 1949–1955

John Michaluk (November 2, 1928 – December 18, 1998) was a Canadian ice hockey left winger who played one game in the National Hockey League with the Chicago Black Hawks during the 1950–51 season, on December 16, 1950, against the Toronto Maple Leafs. The rest of his career, which lasted from 1949 to 1959, was spent in various minor leagues. He died in Calgary on December 18, 1998. John was the brother of the NHL hockey player Art Michaluk.

== Career statistics ==
=== Regular season and playoffs ===
			Regular season					Playoffs
Season	Team	League	GP	G	A	Pts	PIM	GP	G	A	Pts	PIM
1947–48	Wetaskiwin Canadians	AJHL	—	—	—	—	—	—	—	—	—	—
1947–48	Wetaskiwin Canadians	M-Cup	—	—	—	—	—	4	1	0	1	0
1948–49	Calgary Buffaloes	WCJHL	30	26	17	43	24	8	6	5	11	8
1948–49	Calgary Stampeders	WCSHL	2	0	0	0	0	—	—	—	—	—
1948–49	Calgary Buffaloes	M-Cup	—	—	—	—	—	16	3	7	10	22
1949–50	Spokane Flyers	WIHL	58	21	15	36	27	4	1	2	3	0
1950–51	Chicago Black Hawks	NHL	1	0	0	0	0	—	—	—	—	—
1950–51	Milwaukee Sea Gulls	USHL	56	13	11	24	41	—	—	—	—	—
1951–52	Providence Reds	AHL	46	13	12	25	16	3	0	1	1	0
1952–53	Providence Reds	AHL	18	1	3	4	6	—	—	—	—	—
1952–53	Quebec Aces	QSHL	22	3	3	6	17	21	0	2	2	5
1953–54	Calgary Stampeders	WHL	66	7	9	16	8	18	1	7	8	8
1954–55	Calgary Stampeders	WHL	14	3	4	7	2	9	0	0	0	2
NHL totals			1	0	0	0	0	—	—	—	—	—

== See also ==
- List of players who played only one game in the NHL
