= Lloyd Mohns =

Canadian ice hockey player

- Born: July 31, 1921 Petawawa, Ontario, Canada
- Died: January 24, 2005 (aged 83)
- Height: 5 ft 9 in (175 cm)
- Weight: 185 lb (84 kg; 13 st 3 lb)
- Position: Defence
- Shot: Right
- Played for: New York Rangers
- Playing career: 1942–1948

Lloyd Warren Mohns (July 31, 1921 – January 24, 2005) was a Canadian ice hockey defenceman. He played one game in the National Hockey League with the New York Rangers during the 1943–44 season, on January 9, 1944, against the Montreal Canadiens. From 1942 to 1948, the remainder of his career was spent playing in the minor and senior leagues.

== Career statistics ==
=== Regular season and playoffs ===
			Regular season					Playoffs
Season	Team	League	GP	G	A	Pts	PIM	GP	G	A	Pts	PIM
1938–39	Petawawa Cadets	OVJHL	—	—	—	—	—	—	—	—	—	—
1939–40	Pembroke Lumber Kings	OVJHL	8	3	4	7	2	2	0	0	0	0
1940–41	Pembroke Lumber Kings	OVJHL	10	4	3	7	10	4	0	0	0	7
1941–42	Pembroke Lumber Kings	OVJHL	12	2	2	4	16	6	3	2	5	4
1942–43	New York Rovers	EAHL	3	1	0	1	0	10	2	0	2	14
1942–43	Petawawa Grenades	OVHL	8	9	1	10	4	7	3	0	3	0
1942–43	Vancouver Army	NNDHL	1	1	1	2	0	—	—	—	—	—
1943–44	New York Rangers	NHL	1	0	0	0	0	—	—	—	—	—
1943–44	New York Rovers	EAHL	15	2	2	4	25	—	—	—	—	—
1943–44	Brooklyn Crescents	EAHL	30	6	6	12	16	11	3	6	9	13
1944–45	Hershey Bears	AHL	26	3	1	4	27	—	—	—	—	—
1944–45	Philadelphia Falcons	EAHL	1	0	0	0	12	—	—	—	—	—
1944–45	New York Rovers	EAHL	22	4	8	12	31	5	1	1	2	6
1945–46	Pembroke Lumber Kings	OVHL	16	4	2	6	14	3	1	2	3	2
1945–46	Pembroke Lumber Kings	Al-Cup	—	—	—	—	—	9	3	6	9	6
1946–47	Kirkland Lake Blue Devils	NOHA	—	—	—	—	—	—	—	—	—	—
1947–48	Oakland Oaks	PCHL	11	0	2	2	7	—	—	—	—	—
1947–48	Brantford Indians	OHA Sr	9	1	0	1	8	—	—	—	—	—
EAHL totals			71	13	16	29	84	26	6	7	13	33
NHL totals			1	0	0	0	0	—	—	—	—	—

== See also ==
- List of players who played only one game in the NHL
