= Irv McGibbon =

Canadian ice hockey player

- Born: October 11, 1914; Antigonish, Nova Scotia, Canada
- Died: February 1, 1981 (aged 66)
- Height: 6 ft 0 in (183 cm)
- Weight: 180 lb (82 kg; 12 st 12 lb)
- Position: Right wing
- Shot: Right
- Played for: Montreal Canadiens
- Playing career: 1937–1950

Irvine John McGibbon (October 11, 1914 — February 1, 1981) was a Canadian professional ice hockey right winger who played in one National Hockey League game for the Montreal Canadiens during the 1942–43 season, on January 2, 1943 against the Toronto Maple Leafs. The rest of his career, which lasted from 1937 to 1950, was mainly spent in senior hockey leagues.

== Career statistics ==
=== Regular season and playoffs ===
			Regular season					Playoffs
Season	Team	League	GP	G	A	Pts	PIM	GP	G	A	Pts	PIM
1934–35	Antigonish Bulldogs	NSJHL	—	21	12	33	20	—	—	—	—	—
1935–36	Antigonish Bulldogs	NSJHL	—	14	8	22	34	—	—	—	—	—
1936–37	Antigonish Bulldogs	NSJHL	—	—	—	—	—	—	—	—	—	—
1937–38	Sydney Millionaires	CBSHL	—	—	—	—	—	—	—	—	—	—
1938–39	Sydney Millionaires	CBSHL	21	17	9	26	36	3	5	1	6	4
1938–39	Sydney Millionaires	Al-Cup	—	—	—	—	—	6	7	4	11	21
1939–40	Glace Bay Miners	CBSHL	40	25	15	40	59	4	1	0	1	4
1940–41	Glace Bay Miners	CBSHL	42	16	7	23	75	4	0	0	0	4
1941–42	Montreal Senior Canadiens	QSHL	24	5	4	9	18	—	—	—	—	—
1941–42	Washington Lions	AHL	23	3	9	12	13	2	0	0	0	0
1942–43	Montreal Canadiens	NHL	1	0	0	0	2	—	—	—	—	—
1942–43	New Glasgow Bombers	NSAPC	—	—	—	—	—	8	4	5	9	9
1945–46	Pictou Royals	NSAPC	17	13	9	22	19	7	1	10	11	2
1945–46	Antigonish Bulldogs	Al-Cup	—	—	—	—	—	4	1	5	6	0
1946–47	Antigonish Bulldogs	NSAPC	16	16	13	29	—	—	—	—	—	—
1947–48	Antigonish Bulldogs	NSAPC	—	9	12	21	4	—	—	—	—	—
1948–49	Antigonish Bulldogs	NSAPC	—	33	43	76	10	—	—	—	—	—
1949–50	Antigonish Bulldogs	NSAPC	—	—	—	—	—	—	—	—	—	—
NHL totals			1	0	0	0	2	—	—	—	—	—

== See also ==
- List of players who played only one game in the NHL
