= Carl Kaiser =

Canadian ice hockey player

Carl Joseph Kaiser (April 8, 1927 in Winnipeg, Manitoba – April 29, 2010) was a Canadian professional ice hockey player. Kaiser was born into a large family and, as a youth, demonstrated athletic ability, particularly in hockey.

== Career ==
- 1945-46 San Diego Skyhawks,
- 1946-47 Brandon Elks,
- 1947-48 Minneapolis Millers,
- 1948-49 San Francisco Shamrocks,
- 1948-49 Minneapolis Millers,
- 1949-50 Minneapolis Millers,
- 1950-51 Denver Falcons,
- 1951-52 Saskatoon Quakers,
- 1952-53 Saskatoon-Vancouver,
- 1952-53 Vancouver Canucks,
- 1953-54 Vancouver Canucks,
- 1954-55 Vancouver-Saskatoon,
- 1955-56 Vancouver Canucks,
- 1956-57 Vancouver Canucks,
- 1957-58 Victoria Cougars,
- 1958-59 Victoria Cougars,
- 1959-60 Philadelphia Ramblers,
- 1959-60 Victoria Cougars,
- 1960-63 Spokane Comets.

Kaiser played for the Vancouver Canucks during the 1950s (1952 through 1957) as left defenceman. He was selected to the Vancouver Canucks 1950s All Decade Team for his work at that position, and he is in the Vancouver Canucks Hall of Fame for that time period.

During his playing years, Kaiser stood 6 feet (1.8 m) tall with a playing weight of 200 pounds (91 kg). Kaiser shot left and also enjoyed amateur success in other sports including baseball and golf as a hobby. He retired in 1963.
