= Pla-Mor Ballroom =

Multi-purpose event center in Kansas City, Missouri

- Interactive map of Pla-Mor Ballroom
- Location: 3142 Main Street; Kansas City, Missouri, 64111
- Coordinates: 39°04′13″N 94°35′07″W
- Capacity: 4,000 (approximate)

Construction
- Opened: November 24, 1927
- Closed: 1951
- Demolished: 1971

Tenants
- Kansas City Pla-Mors (1927–1950); Kansas City Cowboys / Royals (1950–1951); Kansas City Hi-Spots (1950–51)

The Pla-Mor Ballroom was a multi-purpose event center in Kansas City, Missouri, at 3142 Main Street, directly south of the Union Hill neighborhood. The venue was primarily a music hall used most often for jazz performances but also contained a bowling alley, swimming pool, ballroom, billiard hall and adjacent ice rink.

== History ==
Opened in November of 1927, the Pla-Mor Ballroom was modeled after New York's Roseland Ballroom, Detroit's Graystone Ballroom and Chicago's Aragon. The ballroom billed itself as the largest indoor amusement center in the United States. The venue was a hub of activity for musicians performing in the Kansas City jazz genre during the Jazz Age, holding concerts for the likes of Ella Fitzgerald, Louis Armstrong and Frank Sinatra. Owing to venues such as the Ballroom, Kansas City from the 1920s to the early 1940s was a competitor with New York City and Chicago as a jazz mecca. Beneath the ballroom were facilities for bowling and billiards while an ice rink was built in an adjacent building. In 1931, a swimming pool was added to the complex. At the time it was the largest indoor pool west of the Mississippi River and helped the venue remain a popular attraction for the rest of the decade.

After the start of World War II, the Ballroom saw diminishing crowds. This was partly due to the war but more so because of the movement of residents to the suburban parts of the city. With dwindling attendance and the loss of the Kansas City Royals hockey team in 1951, the Ballroom was closed by the end of the year. The building remained untouched for 20 years before it was demolished to make room for a car dealership.
