= Murdo MacKay =

Canadian ice hockey player

- Born: August 8, 1916; Fort William, Ontario, Canada
- Died: August 8, 2000 (aged 84); Fort William, Ontario, Canada
- Height: 5 ft 11 in (180 cm)
- Weight: 175 lb (79 kg; 12 st 7 lb)
- Position: Right wing/Centre
- Shot: Right
- Played for: Montreal Canadiens
- Playing career: 1936–1953

Murdo John MacKay (August 8, 1916 – August 8, 2000) was a Canadian professional ice hockey forward. MacKay played 14 regular season games and 15 playoff games in the National Hockey League for the Montreal Canadiens between 1946 and 1949. The rest of his career, which lasted from 1936 to 1953, was spent in the minor leagues.

== Career statistics ==
=== Regular season and playoffs ===
			Regular season					Playoffs
Season	Team	League	GP	G	A	Pts	PIM	GP	G	A	Pts	PIM
1932–33	Fort William Forts	TBJHL	7	2	0	2	0	—	—	—	—	—
1933–34	Fort William Cubs	TBJHL	19	11	3	14	16	—	—	—	—	—
1934–35	Fort William Kams	TBJHL	16	8	3	11	6	—	—	—	—	—
1935–36	Fort William Kams	TBJHL	16	23	9	32	10	2	1	0	1	2
1935–36	Fort William Kams	M-Cup	—	—	—	—	—	4	7	3	10	0
1936–37	New York Rovers	EAHL	47	5	5	10	6	3	0	0	0	0
1937–38	New York Rovers	EAHL	39	7	6	13	4	—	—	—	—	—
1938–39	New York Rovers	EAHL	42	20	18	38	8	—	—	—	—	—
1939–40	New York Rovers	EAHL	58	44	44	88	29	—	—	—	—	—
1940–41	Philadelphia Ramblers	AHL	56	20	15	35	12	—	—	—	—	—
1941–42	Buffalo Bisons	AHL	56	21	20	41	17	—	—	—	—	—
1942–43	Nanaimo Navy	NNDHL	20	22	7	29	8	6	5	3	8	6
1943–44	Nanaimo Navy	NNDHL	18	16	8	24	4	—	—	—	—	—
1944–45	Halifax Navy	NSDHL	12	8	6	14	0	6	3	1	4	0
1945–46	Montreal Canadiens	NHL	5	0	1	1	0	—	—	—	—	—
1945–46	Buffalo Bisons	AHL	58	32	31	63	18	12	5	8	13	2
1946–47	Buffalo Bisons	AHL	59	35	26	61	13	4	1	1	2	4
1946–47	Montreal Canadiens	NHL	—	—	—	—	—	9	0	1	1	0
1947–48	Montreal Canadiens	NHL	14	0	2	2	0	—	—	—	—	—
1947–48	Buffalo Bisons	AHL	55	37	39	76	15	8	4	4	8	0
1948–49	Buffalo Bisons	AHL	68	32	52	84	20	—	—	—	—	—
1948–49	Montreal Canadiens	NHL	—	—	—	—	—	6	1	1	2	0
1949–50	Buffalo Bisons	AHL	67	30	24	54	6	5	0	0	0	0
1950–51	Cleveland Barons	AHL	69	25	36	61	6	11	2	2	4	0
1951–52	Quebec Aces	QSHL	40	14	24	38	4	15	5	6	11	6
1952–53	Quebec Aces	QSHL	55	4	18	22	4	22	3	8	11	6
AHL totals			488	232	243	475	107	40	12	15	27	6
NHL totals			19	0	3	3	0	15	1	2	3	0
