= Reg Mackey =

Canadian ice hockey player

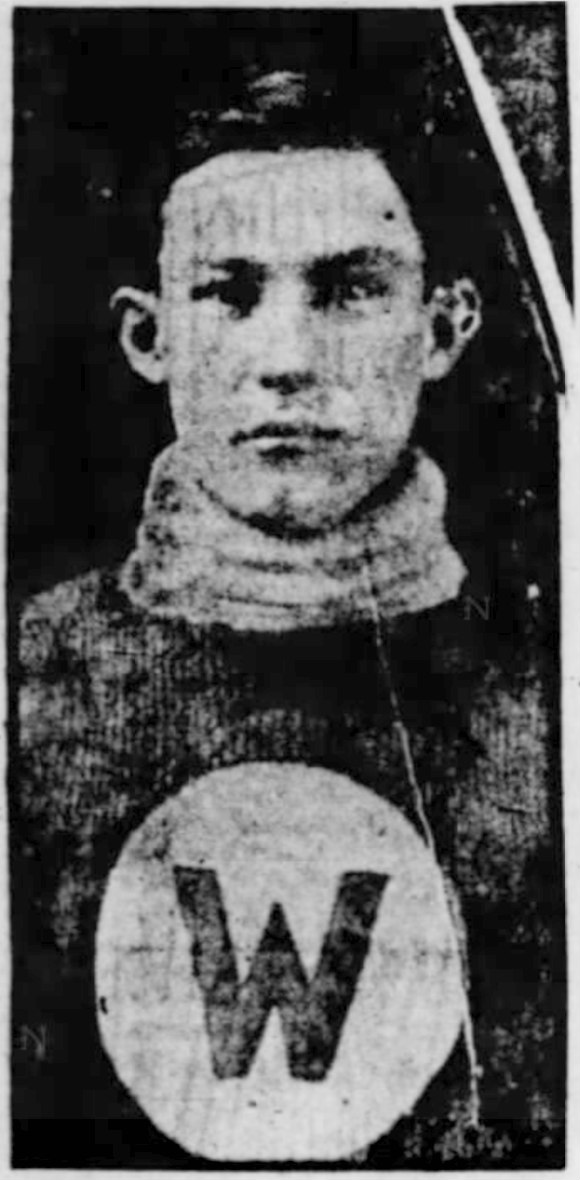
- Mackey while with the Calgary Wanderers
- Born: May 7, 1899 North Gower, Ontario, Canada
- Died: February 26, 1966 (aged 66) Calgary, Alberta, Canada
- Height: 5 ft 7 in (170 cm)
- Weight: 155 lb (70 kg; 11 st 1 lb)
- Position: Defence
- Shot: Left
- Played for: Calgary Tigers; Vancouver Maroons; New York Rangers
- Playing career: 1919–1934

William Reginald Wallace Mackey (May 7, 1899 – February 26, 1966) was a Canadian professional ice hockey defenceman who played one season in the National Hockey League for the New York Rangers, in 1926–27. He also played for the Calgary Tigers and Vancouver Maroons in the Western Canada Hockey League from 1922 to 1934. Mackey was born in North Gower, Ontario and moved to Calgary in 1907. He later married Barbara, and had two daughters. From 1930 to 1964 he worked with the British American Oil Company.

== Career statistics ==
=== Regular season and playoffs ===
			Regular season					Playoffs
Season	Team	League	GP	G	A	Pts	PIM	GP	G	A	Pts	PIM
1919–20	Calgary Wanderers	Big-4	6	1	0	1	0	—	—	—	—	—
1920–21	Calgary City Seniors	CCSHL	—	—	—	—	—	—	—	—	—	—
1921–22	Calgary City Seniors	CCSHL	—	—	—	—	—	—	—	—	—	—
1922–23	Calgary City Seniors	CCSHL	—	—	—	—	—	—	—	—	—	—
1922–23	Calgary Tigers	WCHL	1	0	0	0	0	—	—	—	—	—
1923–24	Bellevue Bulldogs	ASHL	—	—	—	—	—	—	—	—	—	—
1923–24	Bellevue Bulldogs	Al-Cup	—	—	—	—	—	4	1	0	1	0
1924–25	Calgary Tigers	WCHL	16	3	0	3	15	2	0	0	0	2
1925–26	Vancouver Maroons	WHL	29	8	0	8	23	—	—	—	—	—
1926–27	New York Rangers	NHL	41	0	0	0	16	1	0	0	0	0
1927–28	Boston Tigers	Can-Am	37	18	2	20	78	2	0	0	0	2
1928–29	Boston Tigers	Can-Am	33	15	4	19	66	4	1	1	2	8
1929–30	Boston Tigers	Can-Am	37	19	7	26	104	4	3	1	4	16
1930–31	Boston Tigers	Can-Am	40	6	9	15	80	8	1	1	2	6
1932–33	Calgary Tigers	WCHL	30	9	2	11	42	6	0	1	1	5
1933–34	Calgary Tigers	NWHL	3	0	0	0	0	—	—	—	—	—
Can-Am totals			147	58	22	80	328	18	5	3	8	32
NHL totals			41	0	0	0	16	—	—	—	—	—
