= Sherman White (ice hockey) =

Canadian ice hockey player

- Born: May 12, 1923; Cape Tormentine, New Brunswick, Canada
- Died: January 29, 1975 (aged 51)
- Height: 5 ft 10 in (178 cm)
- Weight: 165 lb (75 kg; 11 st 11 lb)
- Position: Centre
- Shot: Right
- Played for: New York Rangers
- Playing career: 1939–1964

Sherman Beverley "Shermie" White (May 12, 1923 – January 29, 1975) was a Canadian ice hockey centre who played four games in the National Hockey League with the New York Rangers during the 1946–47 and 1949–50 seasons. The rest of his career, which lasted from 1939 to 1964, was spent in the minor leagues.

== Career statistics ==
=== Regular season and playoffs ===
			Regular season					Playoffs
Season	Team	League	GP	G	A	Pts	PIM	GP	G	A	Pts	PIM
1938–39	Amherst St. Pats	Exhib	9	11	5	16	18	—	—	—	—	—
1938–39	Amherst St. Pats	M-Cup	—	—	—	—	—	7	17	6	23	8
1939–40	Amherst Ramblers	SNBHL	7	17	5	22	4	5	8	1	9	0
1940–41	Amherst Ramblers	NBCHL	4	12	2	14	0	—	—	—	—	—
1941–42	Amherst Ramblers	NBCHL	7	14	5	19	0	—	—	—	—	—
1942–43	Amherst All-Stars	Exhib	5	14	7	21	0	—	—	—	—	—
1942–43	Amherst Busymen	NSDHL	5	9	8	17	6	1	4	1	5	0
1942–43	Amherst All-Stars	Al-Cup	—	—	—	—	—	2	3	4	7	0
1943–44	Amherst Victoria Bombers	Exhib	1	2	0	2	5	1	1	1	2	2
1943–44	Moncton #5 Providers	NBDHL	1	1	0	1	0	3	3	3	6	0
1943–44	Saint John Beavers	Al-Cup	—	—	—	—	—	1	0	1	1	0
1944–45	Dartmouth RCAF	NSDHL	3	0	1	1	0	3	0	0	0	4
1944–45	Moncton #5 Providers	NBDHL	8	10	5	15	0	2	4	1	5	0
1945–46	Dartmouth RCAF	NSDHL	8	8	8	16	0	5	4	5	9	0
1945–46	Amherst Ramblers	NBCHL	3	6	3	9	0	—	—	—	—	—
1945–46	Moncton Maroons	SNBHL	3	4	7	11	0	3	0	3	3	0
1946–47	New York Rangers	NHL	1	0	0	0	0	—	—	—	—	—
1946–47	New York Rovers	EAHL	19	13	9	22	2	—	—	—	—	—
1946–47	New Haven Ramblers	AHL	36	8	8	16	8	3	2	0	2	0
1947–48	New Haven Ramblers	AHL	58	9	30	39	10	4	0	2	2	2
1948–49	New Haven Ramblers	AHL	68	26	32	58	13	—	—	—	—	—
1949–50	New York Rangers	NHL	3	0	2	2	0	—	—	—	—	—
1949–50	New Haven Ramblers	AHL	70	17	35	52	6	—	—	—	—	—
1950–51	St. Louis Flyers	AHL	66	11	42	53	6	—	—	—	—	—
1951–52	Chicoutimi Sagueneens	QSHL	59	23	32	55	8	18	2	9	11	0
1952–53	Chicoutimi Sagueneens	QSHL	58	26	57	83	6	20	3	16	19	4
1953–54	Chicoutimi Sagueneens	QSHL	51	10	36	46	4	3	1	1	2	0
1954–55	Amherst Ramblers	AC Sr	41	20	46	66	2	8	2	4	6	2
1955–56	Amherst Ramblers	AC Sr	63	42	78	120	2	14	10	9	19	2
1955–56	Saint John Beavers	Al-Cup	—	—	—	—	—	2	0	2	2	0
1958–59	Glace Bay Miners	CBSHL	34	23	54	77	8	3	1	3	4	0
1958–59	Glace Bay Miners	Al-Cup	—	—	—	—	—	6	7	12	19	0
1959–60	Glace Bay Miners	CBSHL	32	24	29	53	2	9	5	8	13	2
1960–61	Amherst Ramblers	NSSHL	31	18	55	73	0	7	1	6	7	0
1960–61	Amherst Ramblers	Al-Cup	—	—	—	—	—	15	5	16	21	0
1961–62	Amherst Ramblers	NSSHL	28	14	27	41	0	9	6	9	15	0
1961–62	Amherst Ramblers	Al-Cup	—	—	—	—	—	8	2	5	7	—
1962–63	Amherst Ramblers	NSSHL	28	21	50	71	6	11	3	3	6	0
1962–63	Moncton Hawks	Al-Cup	—	—	—	—	—	14	4	7	11	6
1963–64	Moncton Hawks	NSSHL	28	9	15	24	2	4	0	1	1	0
AHL totals			298	71	147	218	43	7	2	2	4	2
NHL totals			4	0	2	2	0	—	—	—	—	—
