= Denver Falcons =

American professional ice hockey team

- Founded: 1950
- League: United States Hockey League
- Team history: Denver Falcons; 1950-51
- Based in: Denver, Colorado
- Arena: University of Denver Ice Arena
- Head coach: Bill Cook
- Manager: Lyle Wright
- Championships: 0

The Denver Falcons were the first professional ice hockey team in Colorado. They were a member of the United States Hockey League. Playing their home games at the University of Denver Ice Arena, the team had a memorable season in Denver, starting with winning Colorado's first professional hockey game over the St. Paul Saints 3-1 at DU. After a season which endured the tragic car crash death of Johnny Holota which also injured Billy Warwick, the Falcons advanced to the playoffs. They were defeated by the favored Omaha Knights three games to two, ending the Falcons' only season.

The Falcons were coached by Bill Cook, and managed by Lyle Wright.

== Team record ==
Season	W	L	T	Pts	Win %	Result
1950-51	31	31	2	64	.500	Wild Card

== Players ==
Goalies
#		Player	Catches	Acquired	Place of Birth
1	(Canada)	Lou Crowdis	L	1950	St. Anne de Beaupré, Quebec

Defense
#		Player	Shoots	Acquired	Place of Birth
2	(Canada)	Bob Chrystal	L	1950	Winnipeg, Manitoba
3	(Canada)	Jack Jackson	R	1950	Windsor, Ontario
4	(United Kingdom)	Ian "Fritz" Fraser	L	1950	Johnstown, Scotland
5	(Canada)	Carl Kaiser	L	1950	Winnipeg, Manitoba
	(Poland)	Walter Bak	L	1950	Tarnowiec, Poland
	(Canada)	Joe Crozier	R	1950	Winnipeg, Manitoba

Offense
#		Player	Position	Shoots	Acquired	Place of Birth
6	(Slovenia)	Chuck "Yogi" Kraiger	LW	L	1951	Stará Ľubovňa, Slovakia
7	(Canada)	Harold Brown	RW	L	1950	Brandon, Manitoba
8	(Canada)	Lloyd "Red" Doran	C	L	1950	South Porcupine, Ontario
9	(Canada)	Bill Warwick	LW		1950	Regina, Saskatchewan
10	(Canada)	Neil Strain	LW	L	1950	Kenora, Ontario
11	(Canada)	Ken MacKenzie	LW	L	1950	Winnipeg, Manitoba
12	(United Kingdom)	Billy Richardson	RW	R	1950	Perth, Scotland
13	(Canada)	George "Bus" Agar	C	L	1950	Saskatoon, Saskatchewan
14		Joseph Kaiser			1950
15	(Canada)	Jack Giesebrecht	RW		1950	Petawawa, Ontario
16	(Canada)	Winston "Bing" Juckes	LW	L	1950	Hamiota, Manitoba
	(Canada)	John Bailey	RW	L	1951	Kenora, Ontario
	(Canada)	Rudy Filion	C	L	1951	Cornwall, Ontario
	(Canada)	Johnny Holota	C	L	1951	Hamilton, Ontario
	(Canada)	Joe McArthur	C	R	1950	Markdale, Ontario
	(Canada)	Cal Stearns	RW	R	1951	Edmonton, Alberta
	(Canada)	Nick Tomiuk	LW	L	1951	Connaught, Ontario
		Allen Burman			1950
		Hal Hopper			1951
		Bob "Bush" Jackson			1951

== NHL alumni ==
- Harold Brown - RW with New York Rangers (1946)
- Bob Chrystal - D with New York Rangers (1953–55)
- Joe Crozier - D with Toronto Maple Leafs (1959); Coach with Buffalo Sabres (1972–74) and Toronto Maple Leafs (1981)
- Lloyd "Red" Doran - C with Detroit Red Wings (1946–47)
- Johnny Holota - C with Detroit Red Wings (1943, 1946)
- Jack Jackson - D with Chicago Black Hawks (1946–47)
- Winston "Bing" Juckes - LW with New York Rangers (1947–48; 1949–50)
- Neil Strain - LW with New York Rangers (1952–53)
- Bill Warwick - LW with New York Rangers (1942, 1944)
