= Sid McNabney =

Canadian ice hockey player

- Born: January 15, 1929; Toronto, Ontario, Canada
- Died: February 7, 1957 (aged 28)
- Height: 5 ft 7 in (170 cm)
- Weight: 150 lb (68 kg; 10 st 10 lb)
- Position: Centre
- Shot: Left
- Played for: Montreal Canadiens
- Playing career: 1949–1953

Sidney William McNabney (January 15, 1929 – February 7, 1957) was a Canadian professional ice hockey centre. He played five playoff games for the Montreal Canadiens of the National Hockey League in 1951. He recorded one assist in those five games. The rest of his career, which lasted from 1949 to 1953, was spent in the minor leagues. McNabney and Leo Thiffault are the only players to play five play-off games in the NHL without playing any regular-season games.

McNabney died at the age of 28 due to cancer.

== Career statistics ==
=== Regular season and playoffs ===
			Regular season					Playoffs
Season	Team	League	GP	G	A	Pts	PIM	GP	G	A	Pts	PIM
1946–47	Scarborough Rangers	OHA-B	10	2	6	8	2	2	0	0	0	0
1947–48	Barrie Flyers	OHA	33	14	14	28	36	13	2	4	6	8
1947–48	Barrie Flyers	M-Cup	—	—	—	—	—	10	3	6	9	12
1948–49	Barrie Flyers	OHA	45	27	37	64	91	8	5	7	12	16
1949–50	Buffalo Bisons	AHL	67	12	21	33	41	5	1	1	2	11
1950–51	Buffalo Bisons	AHL	70	28	42	70	35	4	2	3	5	8
1950–51	Montreal Canadiens	NHL	—	—	—	—	—	5	0	1	1	2
1951–52	Buffalo Bisons	AHL	57	19	23	42	51	3	0	0	0	2
1951–52	Edmonton Flyers	PCHL	4	5	1	6	2	—	—	—	—	—
1952–53	Syracuse Warriors	AHL	49	9	11	20	29	2	0	0	0	0
AHL totals			243	68	97	165	156	14	3	4	7	21
NHL totals			—	—	—	—	—	5	0	1	1	2
