= Joe Matte (ice hockey, born 1908) =

Canadian ice hockey player

- Born: March 15, 1908 Bourget, Ontario, Canada
- Died: May 16, 1988 (aged 80)
- Height: 5 ft 10 in (178 cm)
- Weight: 185 lb (84 kg; 13 st 3 lb)
- Position: Defence
- Shot: Right
- Played for: Detroit Cougars; Chicago Black Hawks
- Playing career: 1929–1943

Joseph Roland Lionel Matte (March 15, 1908 — May 16, 1988) was a Canadian professional ice hockey player who played 24 games in the National Hockey League for the Chicago Black Hawks and Detroit Cougars. He played 12 games for the Cougars in the 1929–30 season, and a further 12 with the Black Hawks in the 1942–43 season. The rest of Matte's playing career, which lasted from 1929 to 1943, was primarily spent in the International Hockey League and American Hockey Association. He was born in Bourget, Ontario.

== Career statistics ==
=== Regular season and playoffs ===
			Regular season					Playoffs
Season	Team	League	GP	G	A	Pts	PIM	GP	G	A	Pts	PIM
1928–29	Ottawa Shamrocks	OCJHL	—	—	—	—	—	—	—	—	—	—
1929–30	Detroit Cougars	NHL	12	0	1	1	0	—	—	—	—	—
1929–30	Detroit Olympics	IHL	26	0	0	0	6	—	—	—	—	—
1930–31	Pittsburgh Yellow Jackets	IHL	3	1	0	1	0	—	—	—	—	—
1930–31	Niagara Falls Cataracts	OPHL	25	9	1	10	45	5	2	0	2	10
1930–31	Detroit Olympics	IHL	2	0	0	0	0	—	—	—	—	—
1931–32	Pittsburgh Yellow Jackets	IHL	48	4	4	8	82	—	—	—	—	—
1932–33	Cleveland Indians	IHL	34	3	4	7	34	—	—	—	—	—
1933–34	Cleveland Falcons	IHL	1	0	0	0	0	—	—	—	—	—
1933–34	St. Louis Flyers	AHA	48	11	3	14	78	7	0	0	0	12
1934–35	St. Louis Flyers	AHA	48	14	10	24	50	6	1	1	2	10
1935–36	St. Louis Flyers	AHA	41	5	8	13	38	8	1	0	1	13
1936–37	St. Louis Flyers	AHA	41	5	8	13	36	6	1	0	1	4
1937–38	St. Louis Flyers	AHA	48	15	17	32	45	7	0	3	3	4
1938–39	St. Louis Flyers	AHA	40	13	15	28	28	7	2	1	3	4
1939–40	St. Louis Flyers	AHA	48	13	15	28	46	5	0	1	1	12
1940–41	Kansas City Americans	AHA	44	9	3	12	22	8	1	2	3	16
1941–42	Kansas City Americans	AHA	50	4	6	10	41	6	0	1	1	2
1942–43	Chicago Black Hawks	NHL	12	0	2	2	8	—	—	—	—	—
1942–43	Cleveland Barons	AHL	25	2	5	7	2	3	0	1	1	0
AHA totals			408	89	85	174	384	60	6	9	15	77
NHL totals			12	0	3	3	8	—	—	—	—	—
