= Kansas City Royals (USHL) =

- City: Kansas City, Missouri
- League: United States Hockey League
- Operated: 1950–1951
- Home arena: Pla-Mor Arena

Franchise history
- 1950: Kansas City Cowboys
- 1950–1951: Kansas City Royals

The Kansas City Royals were a minor professional ice hockey team based in Kansas City, Missouri. They operated in the United States Hockey League for just one season before the league folded in 1951.

== History ==
After the Kansas City Mohawks folded in 1950, the city suddenly found itself without a professional ice hockey team. A new franchise was swiftly arranged and started play the following year. Initially called the 'Cowboys', the team held a vote on October 21 and allowed attending fans to select the new name for the franchise. The next day the team was rechristened as the 'Kansas City Royals' and played the remainder of the year under that banner.

The team was not very successful on the ice but, their situation was even worse in the ticket office. The same economic difficulties that had doomed the Mohawks persisted and, without the following that the previous franchise had built over 22 years, the Royals were in dire straits by season's end.

The team was dealt two bad turns in the offseason, first, when the USHL dissolved following the summer meeting and then when the Pla-Mor Arena, the only viable ice rink in the city, closed. With neither a league nor a home there was no possibility of the team continuing and the Royals disbanded.

== Season-by-season results ==
Season	GP	W	L	T	Pts	Finish	Coach	Postseason
1950–51	64	22	36	6	50	5th	Wilf Field	missed
