= 1952–53 WHL season =

- League: Western Hockey League
- Sport: Ice hockey
- Games: 70
- Teams: 8

Regular season
- Season champions: Saskatoon Quakers

President's Cup
- Champions: Edmonton Flyers
- Runners-up: Saskatoon Quakers

Seasons
- 1953–54

The 1952–53 WHL season was the first season of the Western Hockey League. The Edmonton Flyers were the President's Cup champions as they beat the Saskatoon Quakers four games to two in the final series.

== Teams ==
1952–53 Western Hockey League
Team	City	Arena	Capacity
Calgary Stampeders	Calgary, Alberta	Stampede Corral	6,475
Edmonton Flyers	Edmonton, Alberta	Edmonton Stock Pavilion	6,000
New Westminster Royals	New Westminster, British Columbia	Queen's Park Arena	3,500
Saskatoon Quakers	Saskatoon, Saskatchewan	Saskatoon Arena	3,304
Seattle Bombers	Seattle, Washington	Civic Ice Arena	5,000
Tacoma Rockets	Tacoma, Washington	Tacoma Ice Palace	3,816
Vancouver Canucks	Vancouver, British Columbia	PNE Forum	5,050
Victoria Cougars	Victoria, British Columbia	Victoria Memorial Arena	5,000

=== Map of teams ===
WHL Teams

== Final standings ==
Final Season Standings
R	Team	GP	W	L	T	GF	GA	Pts
**1**	**Saskatoon Quakers**	**70**	**35**	**26**	**9**	**268**	**240**	**79**
**2**	**Vancouver Canucks**	**70**	**32**	**28**	**10**	**222**	**216**	**74**
**3**	**Calgary Stampeders**	**70**	**31**	**27**	**12**	**254**	**252**	**74**
**4**	**Edmonton Flyers**	**70**	**31**	**28**	**11**	**263**	**227**	**73**
**5**	**Seattle Bombers**	**70**	**30**	**32**	**8**	**222**	**225**	**68**
**6**	**New Westminster Royals**	**70**	**29**	**33**	**8**	**217**	**254**	**66**
7	Tacoma Rockets	70	27	31	12	246	249	66
8	Victoria Cougars	70	26	36	8	244	273	60

bold - qualified for playoffs

== Playoffs ==
Round 1
1	**Saskatoon Quakers**	**4**
6	New Westminster Royals	3
2	**Vancouver Canucks**	**3**
5	Seattle Bombers	2
3	Calgary Stampeders	2
4	**Edmonton Flyers**	**3**

Round 2
1	**Saskatoon Quakers**	-
bye	-
2	Vancouver Canucks	1
4	**Edmonton Flyers**	**3**

Finals
1	Saskatoon Quakers	2
4	**Edmonton Flyers**	**4**

The Edmonton Flyers win the President's Cup 4 games to 2.

== Awards ==
1952-53 WHL awards
Award	Recipient(s)
President's Cup	Edmonton Flyers
Outstanding Goalkeeper Award	Emile Francis
Leading Scorer Award	Dutch Reibel
George Leader Cup	Emile Francis
Rookie Award	Gerry Foley
