= 1946 Allan Cup =

Canadian senior ice hockey championship

The Allan Cup trophy

The 1946 Allan Cup was the Canadian senior ice hockey championship for the 1945–46 season. The Calgary Stampeders, champions of the Western Canada Senior Hockey League, faced off against the Ontario Hockey Association champion Hamilton Tigers.

George Redding coached the Tigers, and credited journalist Ivan Miller for originating the "Tattered Tigers" nickname in 1945, referring to old uniforms worn by the team on route to reaching the 1946 Allan Cup finals.

== Final ==
Best-of-seven

- Calgary 6 Hamilton 2
- Calgary 6 Hamilton 1
- Calgary 4 Hamilton 3
- Hamilton 3 Calgary 1
- Calgary 1 Hamilton 0

Calgary Stampeders beat Hamilton Tigers 4-1 on series.
