= Tacoma Rockets (1946–1953) =

Ice hockey team

- City: Tacoma, Washington
- League: Pacific Coast Hockey League (1946–52); Western Hockey League (1952–53)
- Operated: 1946–53
- Home arena: Tacoma Ice Arena
- Colors: 1946–52: Orange, black 1952–53: Green, yellow, white
- Head coach: 1946–47: Dave Downie; 1948–53: Muzz Patrick

The Tacoma Rockets were a professional ice hockey team in Tacoma, Washington from 1946 to 1953. The team played in the Pacific Coast Hockey League from 1946 to 1952, which was renamed the Western Hockey League during the Rockets' final season of 1952–1953. The Rockets played at the Tacoma Ice Arena (also known as the Tacoma Ice Palace), which was constructed in 1946 for the team and had a capacity of 3,825 seats and up to 4,400 spectators with standing room.

The Rockets name was resurrected from 1991 to 1995 in the new major junior Western Hockey League, until the team's relocation to Kelowna, British Columbia.

== Season-by-season records ==
Note: GP = Games played, W = Wins, L = Losses, T = Ties Pts = Points, GF = Goals for, GA = Goals against

Season	GP	W	L	T	GF	GA	Points	Finish	Playoffs
1946–47	60	16	42	2	223	324	34	5th, North	Did not qualify
1947–48	66	34	28	4	294	281	72	2nd, North	Lost in round 1
1948–49	70	34	31	5	239	262	73	2nd, North	Lost in round 2
1949–50	70	34	27	9	302	238	77	2nd, North	Lost in round 1
1950–51	70	27	26	17	219	222	71	3rd	Lost in round 1
1951–52	70	34	25	11	293	244	79	3rd	Lost in round 2
1952–53	70	27	31	12	246	249	66	7th	Did not qualify
