= St. Paul Saints (USHL) =

Professional ice hockey team that played from 1945 to 1951 in the United

The St. Paul Saints are a defunct professional ice hockey team that played from 1945 to 1951 in the United States Hockey League. The Saints were based in Saint Paul, Minnesota and played at the St. Paul Auditorium.

The St. Paul Saints used the same name as an amateur, and later, professional ice hockey team that was founded in 1919 in the United States Amateur Hockey Association. In 1925, it played in the Central Hockey League then joined the American Hockey Association in 1926. It played in that league until 1942. A new Saints team was formed in 1945.
