= United States Hockey League (1945–1951) =

Ice hockey league, 1945–1951

The United States Hockey League was a minor professional ice hockey league that operated from 1945 to 1951. It was a post-World War II revival of the American Hockey Association, which shut down in the fall of 1942. The league playoff champion was awarded the Paul W. Loudon Trophy while the regular season champions were awarded the Directors' Cup.

Going into the league meetings in June 1951, there were rumors that half of the teams in the league were ready to pull out of the USHL. League vice-president, Harry Fowler of the Omaha Knights, said that a group in Wichita, Kansas was expected to apply for membership, and Sioux City, Iowa had also been mentioned as a potential addition to the league. The league ended up folding.

== Teams ==
- Dallas Texans (1945–46 to 1948–49)
- Denver Falcons (1950–51)
- Fort Worth Rangers (1945–46 to 1948–49)
- Houston Huskies (1947–48 to 1948–49)
- Houston Skippers (1946–47)
- Kansas City Mohawks (1949–50)
- Kansas City Pla-Mors (1945–46 to 1948–49)
- Kansas City Cowboys / Royals (1950–51)
- Louisville Blades (1949–50)
- Milwaukee Sea Gulls (1950–51)
- Minneapolis Millers (1945–46 to 1949–50)
- Omaha Knights (1945–46 to 1950–51)
- St. Paul Saints (1945–46 to 1950–51)
- Tulsa Oilers (1945–46 to 1950–51)

== Champions ==
Season	Regular season	Playoffs
1950–51	Omaha Knights	Omaha Knights
1949–50	Omaha Knights	Minneapolis Millers
1948–49	St. Paul Saints	St. Paul Saints
1947–48	Houston Huskies	Houston Huskies
1946–47	Omaha Knights	Kansas City Pla-mors
1945–46	Kansas City Pla-mors	Kansas City Pla-mors
