= List of NHL players (G) =

This is a list of National Hockey League (NHL) players who have played at least one game in the NHL from 1917 to present and have a last name that starts with "G".

List updated as of the 2018–19 NHL season.

== Ga ==
- Marian Gaborik
- Kurtis Gabriel
- Jonah Gadjovich
- Bill Gadsby
- Link Gaetz
- Joaquin Gage
- Jody Gage
- Art Gagne
- Paul Gagne
- Pierre Gagne
- Simon Gagne
- Dave Gagner
- Sam Gagner
- Aaron Gagnon
- Dave Gagnon
- Germain Gagnon
- Johnny Gagnon
- Sean Gagnon
- Bob Gainey
- Steve Gainey
- Norman "Dutch" Gainor
- Maxim Galanov
- Michel Galarneau
- Percy Galbraith
- Alex Galchenyuk
- Brendan Gallagher
- John Gallagher
- Brett Gallant
- Gerard Gallant
- Garry Galley
- Jamie Gallimore
- Don Gallinger
- Jakub Galvas
- Simon Gamache
- Joseph Gambardella
- Bruce Gamble
- Dick Gamble
- Troy Gamble
- Dylan Gambrell
- Gary Gambucci
- Perry Ganchar
- Dave Gans
- Ryan Garbutt
- Bert Gardiner
- Bruce Gardiner
- Chuck Gardiner
- Herb Gardiner
- Bill Gardner
- Cal Gardner
- Dave Gardner
- George Gardner
- Paul Gardner
- Rhett Gardner
- Danny Gare
- Ray Gariepy
- Conor Garland
- Scott Garland
- Rob Garner
- Tyrone Garner
- Michael Garnett
- Mathieu Garon
- Johan Garpenlov
- Dudley "Red" Garrett
- John Garrett
- Jason Garrison
- Mike Gartner
- Bob Gassoff
- Brad Gassoff
- Dave Gatherum
- Steve Gatzos
- Adam Gaudette
- Frederick Gaudreau
- Johnny Gaudreau
- Rob Gaudreau
- Armand Gaudreault
- Leo Gaudreault
- Michael Gaul
- Jean-Marc Gaulin
- Dallas Gaume
- Brendan Gaunce
- Cameron Gaunce
- Paul Gaustad
- Art "Nosey" Gauthier
- Cutter Gauthier
- Daniel Gauthier
- Denis Gauthier
- Fern Gauthier
- Frederik Gauthier
- Gabe Gauthier
- Jean Gauthier
- Julien Gauthier
- Luc Gauthier
- Paul Gauthier
- Sean Gauthier
- Jocelyn Gauvreau
- Aaron Gavey
- Stewart Gavin
- Vladislav Gavrikov
- Glenn Gawdin
- Luke Gazdic

== Ge ==
- Bob Geale
- George "Hully" Gee
- Morgan Geekie
- Mason Geertsen
- Gary Geldart
- Eric Gelinas
- Martin Gelinas
- Jack Gelineau
- Jean-Guy Gendron
- Martin Gendron
- Chay Genoway
- Bernie "Boom-Boom" Geoffrion
- Blake Geoffrion
- Dan Geoffrion
- Alexandar Georgiev
- George "Gerry" Geran
- Eddie Gerard
- Nathan Gerbe
- Martin Gerber
- Eric Germain
- Carsen Germyn
- Ken Gernander
- Shane Gersich
- Bruno Gervais
- Ray Getliffe
- Timothy Gettinger
- Ryan Getzlaf

== Gi ==
- Eddie Giacomin
- Mario Giallonardo
- Barry Gibbs
- Christopher Gibson
- Don Gibson
- Doug Gibson
- John Gibson (born 1959)
- John Gibson (born 1993)
- Roy "Gus" Giesebrecht
- Lee Giffin
- Brandon Gignac
- Jean-Sebastien Giguere
- Dennis Gilbert
- Ed Gilbert
- Gilles Gilbert
- Greg Gilbert
- Jeannot Gilbert
- Rod Gilbert
- Tom Gilbert
- Stan Gilbertson
- Brent Gilchrist
- Curt Giles
- Randy Gilhen
- Andre Gill
- Hal Gill
- Todd Gill
- Don Gillen
- Farrand Gillie
- Clark Gillies
- Colton Gillies
- Jon Gillies
- Trevor Gillies
- Jere Gillis
- Mike Gillis
- Paul Gillis
- Doug Gilmour
- John Gilmour
- Matt Gilroy
- Gaston Gingras
- Adam Ginning
- Brian Gionta
- Stephen Gionta
- Mark Giordano
- Bob Girard
- Jonathan Girard
- Ken Girard
- Samuel Girard
- Daniel Girardi
- Zemgus Girgensons
- Alexandre Giroux
- Art Giroux
- Claude Giroux
- Damien Giroux
- Larry Giroux
- Pierre Giroux
- Raymond Giroux
- Jeff Giuliano

== Gl ==
- Bob Gladney
- Jean-Paul Gladu
- Cody Glass
- Jeff Glass
- Tanner Glass
- Ben Gleason
- Tim Gleason
- Curtis Glencross
- Luke Glendening
- Brian Glennie
- Scott Glennie
- Matt Glennon
- Rob Globke
- Lorry Gloeckner
- Danny Gloor
- Fred Glover
- Howie Glover
- Mike Glumac
- Brian Glynn

== Go ==
- Marcel Goc
- Sascha Goc
- Eric Godard
- Ernie Godden
- Warren Godfrey
- Eddy Godin
- Sammy Godin
- Alexander Godynyuk
- Pete Goegan
- Dave Goertz
- Steven Goertzen
- Bob Goldham
- Erich Goldmann
- Nikolay Goldobin
- Bill Goldsworthy
- Leroy Goldsworthy
- Glenn Goldup
- Hank Goldup
- Alex Goligoski
- Cody Goloubef
- Yan Golubovsky
- Scott Gomez
- Gage Goncalves
- Sergei Gonchar
- Daniel Goneau
- Billy Gooden
- Larry Goodenough
- Ebbie Goodfellow
- Barclay Goodrow
- Paul Goodman
- Viktor Gordiuk
- Andrew Gordon
- Boyd Gordon
- Fred Gordon
- Jack Gordon
- Robb Gordon
- Scott Gordon
- Lee Goren
- Tom Gorence
- Josh Gorges
- Butch Goring
- Dave Gorman
- Edwin Gorman
- Brandon Gormley
- Benoit Gosselin
- David Gosselin
- Guy Gosselin
- Mario Gosselin
- Shayne Gostisbehere
- Steve Gotaas
- Johnny Gottselig
- Tyrell Goulbourne
- Bobby Gould
- John Gould
- Larry Gould
- Michel Goulet
- Cliff Goupille
- Yanni Gourde
- David Gove
- Chris Govedaris
- David Goverde
- Gerry Goyer
- Phil Goyette

== Gr ==
- Michael Grabner
- Tony Graboski
- Mikhail Grabovski
- Evgeny Grachev
- Bob Gracie
- Thomas Gradin
- Collin Graf
- Marc-Andre Gragnani
- Dirk Graham
- Leth Graham
- Pat Graham
- Rod Graham
- Ted Graham
- John Grahame
- Ron Grahame
- Tony Granato
- Jean-Luc Grand-Pierre
- Markus Granlund
- Mikael Granlund
- Alex Grant
- Benny Grant
- Danny Grant
- Derek Grant
- Doug Grant
- Benoit Gratton
- Chris Gratton
- Dan Gratton
- Gilles Gratton
- Josh Gratton
- Norm Gratton
- Kevin Gravel
- Leo Gravelle
- Adam Graves
- Hilliard Graves
- Ryan Graves
- Steve Graves
- Alex Gray
- Gerry Gray
- Harrison Gray
- Terry Gray
- Jet Greaves
- Denis Grebeshkov
- Anthony Greco
- Josh Green
- Mike Green (born 1979)
- Mike Green (born 1985)
- Red Green
- Rick Green
- Ted Green
- Travis Green
- Wilfred "Shorty" Green
- Andy Greene
- Matt Greene
- Colin Greening
- Jeff Greenlaw
- Mike Greenlay
- Kyle Greentree
- Jordan Greenway
- A. J. Greer
- Randy Gregg
- Noah Gregor
- Bruce Greig
- Mark Greig
- Ridly Greig
- Alexandre Grenier
- Lucien Grenier
- Martin Grenier
- Richard Grenier
- Ron Greschner
- Brent Gretzky
- Wayne Gretzky
- Mike Grier
- Brent Grieve
- George Grigor
- Mikhail Grigorenko
- Stu Grimson
- John Grisdale
- Francois Groleau
- Stanislav Gron
- Tuomas Gronman
- Lloyd Gronsdahl
- Jari Gronstrand
- Michal Grosek
- Jordan Gross
- Lloyd Gross
- Nicklas Grossmann
- Don Grosso
- Leonard Grosvenor
- Benoit-Olivier Groulx
- Wayne Groulx
- Philipp Grubauer
- John Gruden
- Jonathan Gruden
- Danny Gruen
- Scott Gruhl
- Carl Grundstrom
- Eric Gryba
- Bob Gryp
- Matt Grzelcyk

== Gu ==
- Francois Guay
- Paul Guay
- Radko Gudas
- Erik Gudbranson
- Max Guenette
- Steve Guenette
- Nate Guenin
- Dylan Guenther
- Jake Guentzel
- Daniel Guerard
- Stephane Guerard
- Bill Guerin
- Jocelyn Guevremont
- Brendan Guhle
- Kaiden Guhle
- Aldo Guidolin
- Bep Guidolin
- Robert Guindon
- Ben Guite
- Carl Gunnarsson
- Steve Guolla
- Miloslav Guren
- Denis Gurianov
- Alexei Gusarov
- Nikita Gusev
- Sergei Gusev
- Daniil Gushchin
- Ravil Gusmanov
- Dave Gust
- Derek Gustafson
- Bengt-Ake Gustafsson
- David Gustafsson
- Erik Gustafsson
- Per Gustafsson
- Filip Gustavsson
- Jonas Gustavsson
- Peter Gustavsson
- Cole Guttman
- Kevan Guy

== See also ==
- hockeydb.com NHL Player List - G
