= List of NHL players (F) =

This is a list of National Hockey League (NHL) players who have played at least one game in the NHL from 1917 to present and have a last name that starts with "F".

List updated as of the 2018–19 NHL season.

== Fa ==
- Robby Fabbri
- Dante Fabbro
- Brock Faber
- Samuel Fagemo
- Brian Fahey
- Jim Fahey
- Trevor Fahey
- Bill Fairbairn
- Cade Fairchild
- Kelly Fairchild
- Radek Faksa
- Justin Falk
- Bob Falkenberg
- Pat Falloon
- Scott Fankhouser
- Oscar Fantenberg
- Adam Fantilli
- Joel Farabee
- Jeff Farkas
- Norm "Rocky" Farr
- David Farrance
- Walt "Whitey" Farrant
- Mike Farrell
- Sean Farrell
- Dave Farrish
- Hudson Fasching
- Gord Fashoway
- Brad Fast
- Jesper Fast
- Viktor Fasth
- Drew Fata
- Rico Fata
- Mario Faubert
- Justin Faulk
- Alex Faulkner
- Ted Fauss
- Andre Faust
- Doug Favell
- Mark Fayne

== Fe ==
- Dave Feamster
- Glen Featherstone
- Tony Featherstone
- Bernie Federko
- Fedor Fedorov
- Sergei Fedorov
- Todd Fedoruk
- Ruslan Fedotenko
- Anatoli Fedotov
- Ivan Fedotov
- Taylor Fedun
- Brent Fedyk
- Martin Fehervary
- Eric Fehr
- Chris Felix
- Brian Felsner
- Denny Felsner
- Tony Feltrin
- Paul Fenton
- David Fenyves
- Andrew Ference
- Brad Ference
- Tom Fergus
- Craig Ferguson
- Dylan Ferguson
- George Ferguson
- John Ferguson
- Lorne Ferguson
- Norm Ferguson
- Scott Ferguson
- Jonathan Ferland
- Manny Fernandez
- Mark Ferner
- Chris Ferraro
- Landon Ferraro
- Mario Ferraro
- Peter Ferraro
- Ray Ferraro
- Benn Ferriero
- Brett Festerling
- Viacheslav Fetisov

== Fi ==
- Kevin Fiala
- Jesse Fibiger
- Eric Fichaud
- Vernon Fiddler
- Mike Fidler
- Wilf Field
- Guyle Fielder
- Nikita Filatov
- Jonathan Filewich
- Dmitri Filimonov
- Bob Fillion
- Marcel Fillion
- Tommy Filmore
- Valtteri Filppula
- Jeff Finger
- Lloyd Finkbeiner
- Brian Finley
- Jeff Finley
- Joe Finley
- Steven Finn
- Sid Finney
- Eddie Finnigan
- Frank Finnigan
- Giovanni Fiore
- Peter Fiorentino
- Christian Fischer
- Jiri Fischer
- Patrick Fischer
- Ron Fischer
- Stephane Fiset
- Alvin Fisher
- Craig Fisher
- Dunc Fisher
- Joe Fisher
- Mike Fisher
- Mark Fistric
- Bob Fitchner
- Casey Fitzgerald
- Rusty Fitzgerald
- Tom Fitzgerald
- Zack Fitzgerald
- Sandy Fitzpatrick
- Mark Fitzpatrick
- Rory Fitzpatrick
- Ross Fitzpatrick
- Trey Fix-Wolansky

== Fl ==
- Wade Flaherty
- Fernie Flaman
- Patrick Flatley
- Tomas Fleischmann
- Gerry Fleming
- Reg Fleming
- John Flesch
- Steven Fletcher
- Bill Flett
- Cale Fleury
- Haydn Fleury
- Marc-Andre Fleury
- Theoren Fleury
- Todd Flichel
- Ryan Flinn
- Rob Flockhart
- Ron Flockhart
- Mark Flood
- Justin Florek
- Larry Floyd
- Brian Flynn

== Fo ==
- Dan Focht
- Warren Foegele
- Tyson Foerster
- Bryan Fogarty
- Steven Fogarty
- Lee Fogolin
- Lee Fogolin, Sr.
- Peter Folco
- Gerry Foley
- Rick Foley
- Marcus Foligno
- Mike Foligno
- Nick Foligno
- Christian Folin
- Bill Folk
- Len Fontaine
- Jon Fontas
- Val Fonteyne
- Lou Fontinato
- Spencer Foo
- Adam Foote
- Callan Foote
- Nolan Foote
- Colin Forbes
- Dave Forbes
- Mike Forbes
- Jake Forbes
- Derek Forbort
- Brian Ford
- Parker Ford
- Connie Forey
- Alex Formenton
- Jakob Forsbacka Karlsson
- Filip Forsberg
- Peter Forsberg
- Jack Forsey
- Gustav Forsling
- Gus Forslund
- Tomas Forslund
- Alex Forsyth
- Dave Fortier
- Gabriel Fortier
- Marc Fortier
- Alexandre Fortin
- Jean-Francois Fortin
- Ray Fortin
- Maxime Fortunus
- Alex Foster
- Brian Foster
- Corey Foster
- Dwight Foster
- Harry "Yip" Foster
- Herb Foster
- Kurtis Foster
- Norm Foster
- Scott Foster
- Nick Fotiu
- Kris Foucault
- Jean-Luc Foudy
- Liam Foudy
- Mike Fountain
- Cam Fowler
- Jimmy Fowler
- Hec Fowler
- Tom Fowler
- Adam Fox
- Greg Fox
- Jim Fox
- Matt Foy
- Frank Foyston

== Fr ==
- Bob Frampton
- Lou Franceschetti
- Bobby Francis
- Emile Francis
- Ron Francis
- Pavel Francouz
- Jimmy Franks
- Cody Franson
- Johan Franzen
- Archie Fraser
- Colin Fraser
- Charles Fraser
- Curt Fraser
- Gord Fraser
- Harvey Fraser
- Iain Fraser
- Jamie Fraser
- Mark Fraser
- Scott Fraser
- Dan Frawley
- Jeff Frazee
- Kyle Freadrich
- Trent Frederic
- Ray Frederick
- Frank Fredrickson
- Kris Fredheim
- Mark Freer
- Irv Frew
- Tim Friday
- Dan Fridgen
- Doug Friedman
- Mark Friedman
- Alex Friesen
- Jeff Friesen
- Karl Friesen
- Ron Friest
- Len Frig
- Trevor Frischmon
- Jamie Fritsch
- Dan Fritsche
- Mitch Fritz
- Tanner Fritz
- Martin Frk
- Jesper Froden
- Bob Froese
- Byron Froese
- Michael Frolik
- Alexander Frolov
- Harry Frost
- Morgan Frost
- Miroslav Frycer
- Bob Fryday

== Ft–Fu ==
- Robbie Ftorek
- Zachary Fucale
- Grant Fuhr
- Yutaka Fukufuji
- Kaden Fulcher
- Larry Fullan
- Michael Funk
- Mark Fusco
- Owen Fussey

== See also ==
- hockeydb.com NHL Player List - F
