= Dean Morton =

Canadian ice hockey player and referee

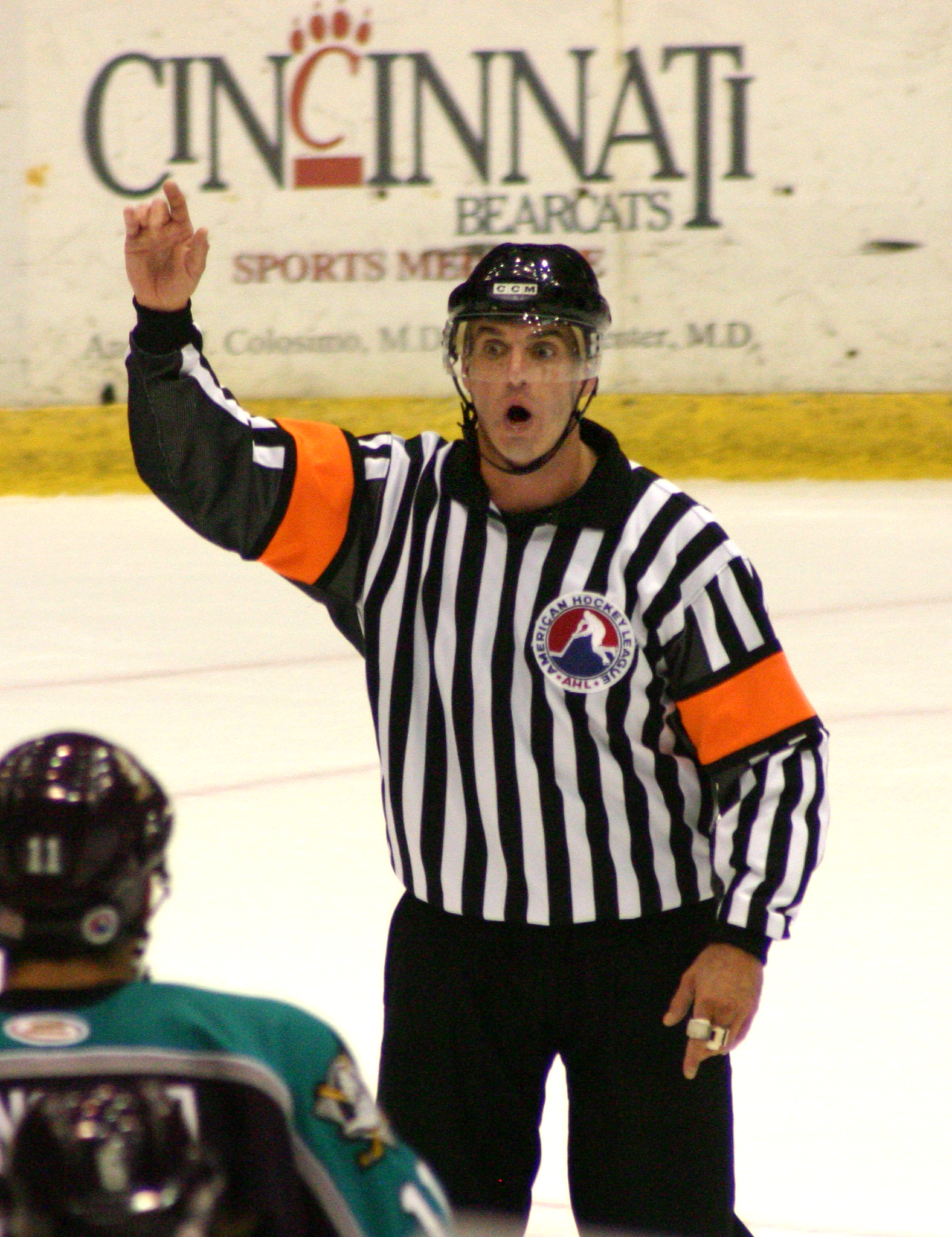
- Morton in 2004
- Born: February 27, 1968 (age 58) Peterborough, Ontario, Canada
- Height: 6 ft 1 in (185 cm)
- Weight: 196 lb (89 kg; 14 st 0 lb)
- Position: Defence
- Shot: Right
- Played for: Detroit Red Wings
- NHL draft: 148th overall, 1986; Detroit Red Wings
- Playing career: 1988–1993

Dean Morton (born February 27, 1968) is a Canadian former ice hockey referee in the National Hockey League (NHL), and a former defenceman who played one game in the NHL in 1989.

== Biography ==
As a youth, Morton played in the 1981 Quebec International Pee-Wee Hockey Tournament with a minor ice hockey team from Peterborough, Ontario.

He played in one NHL game for the Detroit Red Wings during the 1989–90 NHL season, and is one of only five players to score a goal in their only NHL game, along with Brad Fast, Samuel Henley, Rolly Huard and Yegor Korshkov.

He received media attention on HBO's 24/7 Winter Classic special when a post-game dressing room scene showed him being congratulated for a "ballsy call" by partner Stephen Walkom. The call in question was a goaltender interference call to disallow a goal by the Pittsburgh Penguins that would have tied the game against the Washington Capitals.

Dean Morton officiated his final NHL game on March 12, 2022, in Calgary, Alberta at the Saddledome, in a game between the Calgary Flames and the Detroit Red Wings.

== Career statistics ==
=== Regular season and playoffs ===
			Regular season					Playoffs
Season	Team	League	GP	G	A	Pts	PIM	GP	G	A	Pts	PIM
1984–85	Peterborough Voyageurs	MIDG	47	9	38	47	158	—	—	—	—	—
1985–86	Ottawa 67's	OHL	16	3	1	4	32	—	—	—	—	—
1985–86	Oshawa Generals	OHL	48	2	6	8	92	5	0	0	0	9
1986–87	Oshawa Generals	OHL	62	1	11	12	165	23	3	6	9	112
1986–87	Oshawa Generals	M-Cup	—	—	—	—	—	4	0	0	0	19
1987–88	Oshawa Generals	OHL	57	6	19	25	187	7	0	0	0	18
1988–89	Adirondack Red Wings	AHL	66	2	15	17	186	8	0	1	1	13
1989–90	Detroit Red Wings	NHL	1	1	0	1	2	—	—	—	—	—
1989–90	Adirondack Red Wings	AHL	75	1	15	16	183	6	0	0	0	30
1990–91	Adirondack Red Wings	AHL	1	0	0	0	0	—	—	—	—	—
1990–91	San Diego Gulls	IHL	47	0	6	6	124	—	—	—	—	—
1990–91	Hampton Roads Admirals	ECHL	2	1	1	2	0	14	3	10	13	58
1991–92	Moncton Hawks	AHL	6	1	1	2	15	—	—	—	—	—
1991–92	Michigan Falcons	CoHL	38	4	19	23	96	—	—	—	—	—
1992–93	Cincinnati Cyclones	IHL	7	0	0	0	44	—	—	—	—	—
1992–93	Brantford Smoke	CoHL	37	2	17	19	217	15	1	3	4	38
AHL totals			148	4	31	35	384	14	0	1	1	43
NHL totals			1	1	0	1	2	—	—	—	—	—

== See also ==
- List of NHL on-ice officials
- List of players who played only one game in the NHL
