= John McCahill =

Canadian ice hockey player

- Born: February 12, 1955 (age 70); Sarnia, Ontario, Canada
- Height: 6 ft 2 in (188 cm)
- Weight: 205 lb (93 kg; 14 st 9 lb)
- Position: Defence
- Shot: Right
- Played for: Colorado Rockies
- NHL draft: Undrafted
- Playing career: 1978–1981

John Walter McCahill (born February 12, 1955) is a Canadian retired professional ice hockey defenceman who played in one National Hockey League game for the Colorado Rockies during the 1977–78 NHL season.

== Career statistics ==
=== Regular season and playoffs ===
			Regular season					Playoffs
Season	Team	League	GP	G	A	Pts	PIM	GP	G	A	Pts	PIM
1972–73	Sarnia Bees	WOHL	—	—	—	—	—	—	—	—	—	—
1974–75	University of Michigan	B-10	21	0	7	7	18	—	—	—	—	—
1975–76	University of Michigan	B-10	42	3	23	26	28	—	—	—	—	—
1976–77	University of Michigan	B-10	45	0	27	27	54	—	—	—	—	—
1977–78	University of Michigan	B-10	35	5	23	28	32	—	—	—	—	—
1977–78	Colorado Rockies	NHL	1	0	0	0	0	—	—	—	—	—
1977–78	Tulsa Oilers	CHL	9	1	0	1	0	7	0	0	0	7
1978–79	Philadelphia Firebirds	AHL	77	5	12	17	36	—	—	—	—	—
1979–80	Fort Worth Texans	CHL	31	4	14	18	10	—	—	—	—	—
1979–80	Oklahoma City Stars	CHL	51	4	19	23	14	—	—	—	—	—
1980–81	Fort Worth Texans	CHL	8	1	2	3	11	—	—	—	—	—
1980–81	Muskegon Mohawks	IHL	48	7	20	27	29	—	—	—	—	—
AHL totals			245	59	98	157	494	23	5	6	11	57
NHL totals			1	0	0	0	0	—	—	—	—	—

== See also ==
- List of players who played only one game in the NHL
