= List of players who played only one game in the NHL =

This is a list of ice hockey players who have played only one game in the National Hockey League (NHL) from 1917–18 to the present. This list does not count those who were on the active roster for one game but never actually played, or players who played one or more games in the NHL's predecessor, the NHA.

== Key ==
‡ The single appearance was in a Stanley Cup playoffs game
† The single appearance was during the most recent (2024–25) completed season – some potential to be dropped from this list in near future

General terms and abbreviations
| Term or abbreviation | Definition |
|---|---|
| Ref | Reference |

Goaltender statistical abbreviations
| Abbreviation | Definition |
|---|---|
| Min | Minutes played |
| GA | Goals against |
| GAA | Goals against average |

Skater statistical abbreviations
| Abbreviation | Definition |
|---|---|
| Pos | Position |
| G | Goals |
| A | Assists |
| P | Points |
| PIM | Penalty minutes |
| D | Defence |
| F | Forward |
| LW | Left wing |
| C | Centre |
| RW | Right wing |

== Goaltenders ==
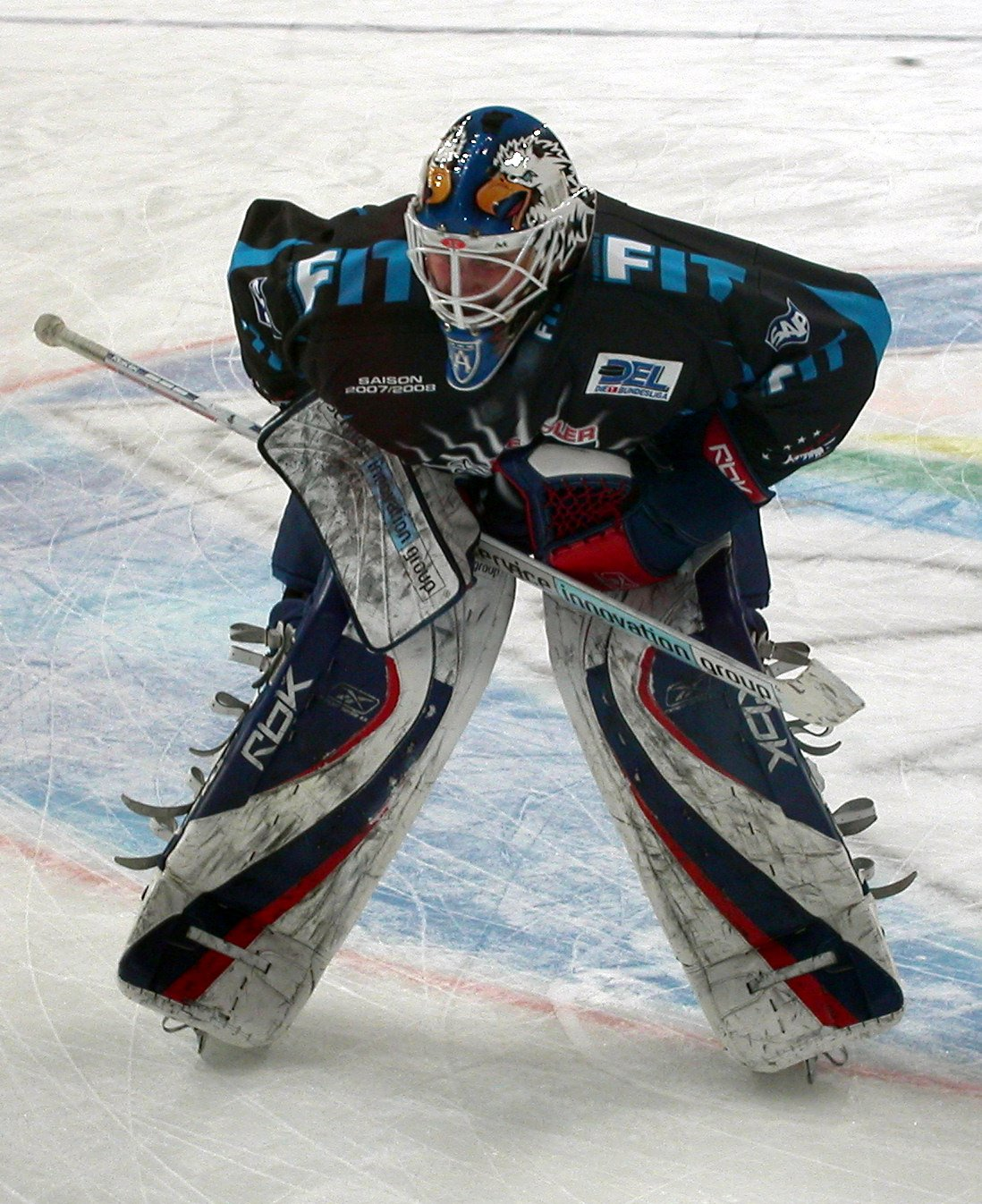
Adam Hauser

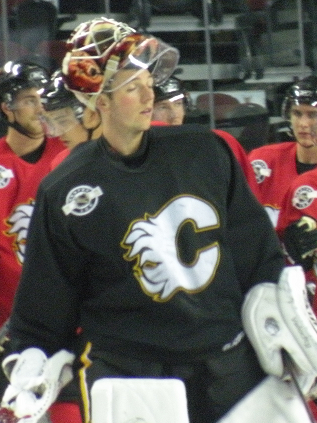
Matt Keetley

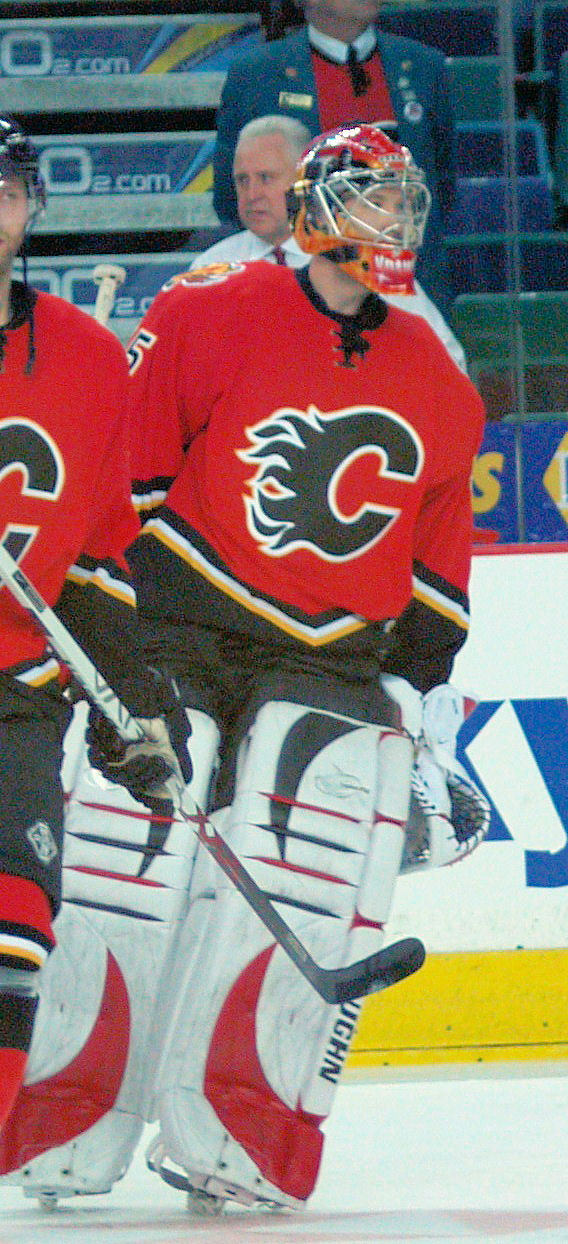
Brent Krahn

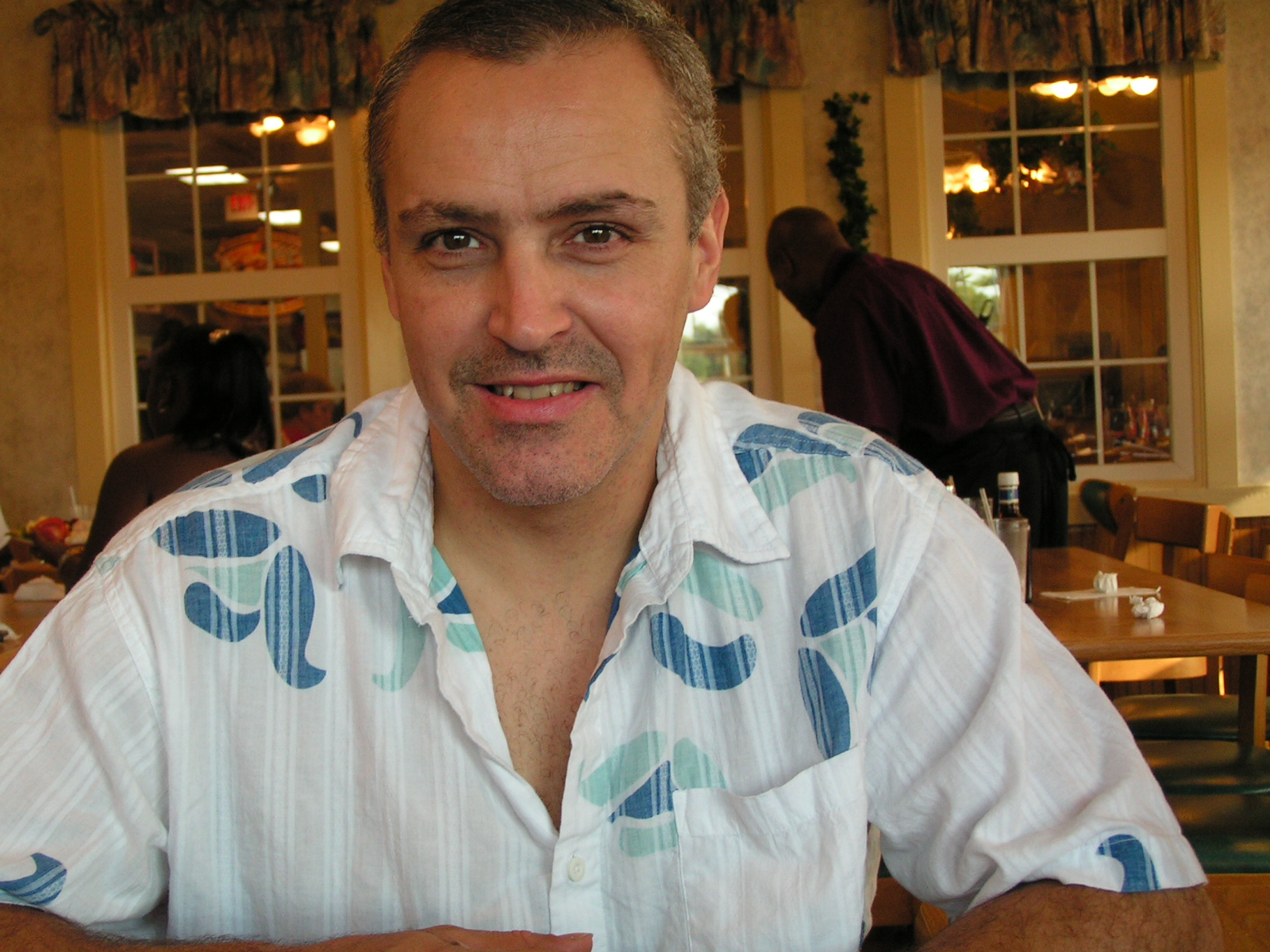
Ray LeBlanc

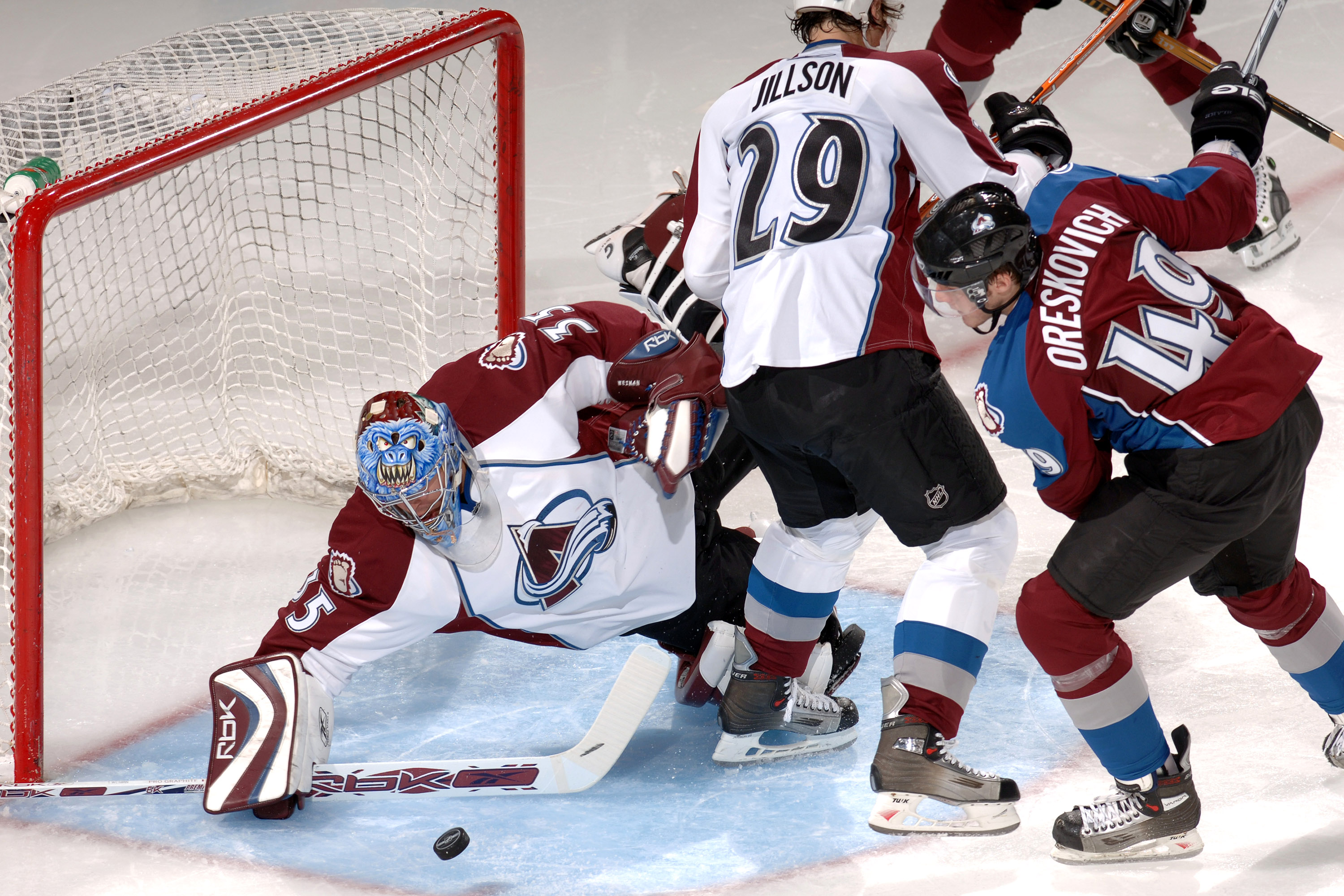
Tyler Weiman

Goaltenders who played in only one NHL regular season or playoff game
| Name | Team | Season | Decision | Min | GA | GAA | Ref |
|---|---|---|---|---|---|---|---|
| George Abbott | Boston Bruins | 1943–44 | Loss | 60 | 7 | 7.00 | |
| John Aiken | Montreal Canadiens | 1957–58 | Loss | 34 | 6 | 10.59 | |
| Jett Alexander | Toronto Maple Leafs | 2022–23 | No decision | 1 | 0 | 0.00 | |
| Hugo Alnefelt | Tampa Bay Lightning | 2021–22 | No decision | 20 | 3 | 9.00 | |
| Jorge Alves | Carolina Hurricanes | 2016–17 | No decision | 1 | 0 | 0.00 | |
| David Ayres | Carolina Hurricanes | 2019–20 | Win | 29 | 2 | 4.18 | |
| Chris Beckford-Tseu | St. Louis Blues | 2007–08 | No decision | 27 | 1 | 2.25 | |
| Matt Berlin | Edmonton Oilers | 2022–23 | No decision | 2 | 0 | 0.00 | |
| Andre Binette | Montreal Canadiens | 1954–55 | Win | 60 | 4 | 4.00 | |
| Dick Bittner | Boston Bruins | 1949–50 | Tie | 60 | 3 | 3.00 | |
| Lionel Bouvrette | New York Rangers | 1942–43 | Loss | 60 | 6 | 6.00 | |
| Len Broderick | Montreal Canadiens | 1957–58 | Win | 60 | 2 | 2.00 | |
| Ken Brown | Chicago Black Hawks | 1970–71 | No decision | 18 | 1 | 3.33 | |
| Tyler Bunz | Edmonton Oilers | 2014–15 | No decision | 20 | 3 | 9.00 | |
| Don Caley | St. Louis Blues | 1967–68 | No decision | 30 | 3 | 6.00 | |
| Sebastien Centomo | Toronto Maple Leafs | 2001–02 | No decision | 40 | 3 | 4.50 | |
| Mathieu Chouinard | Los Angeles Kings | 2003–04 | No decision | 3 | 0 | 0.00 | |
| Les Colvin | Boston Bruins | 1948–49 | Loss | 60 | 4 | 4.00 | |
| Sebastian Cossa | Detroit Red Wings | 2024–25† | Win | 45 | 2 | 2.67 | |
| Wayne Cowley | Edmonton Oilers | 1993–94 | Loss | 57 | 3 | 3.15 | |
| Claude Cyr | Montreal Canadiens | 1958–59 | No decision | 20 | 1 | 3.00 | |
| Corrie D'Alessio | Hartford Whalers | 1992–93 | No decision | 11 | 0 | 0.00 | |
| Nick Damore | Boston Bruins | 1941–42 | Win | 60 | 3 | 3.00 | |
| Bob DeCourcy | New York Rangers | 1947–48 | Loss | 29 | 6 | 12.41 | |
| Mark Dekanich | Nashville Predators | 2010–11 | No decision | 50 | 3 | 3.60 | |
| Bill Dickie | Chicago Black Hawks | 1941–42 | Win | 60 | 3 | 3.00 | |
| Jeremy Duchesne | Philadelphia Flyers | 2009–10 | No decision | 17 | 1 | 3.59 | |
| Parris Duffus | Phoenix Coyotes | 1996–97 | No decision | 29 | 1 | 2.08 | |
| Bob Dupuis | Edmonton Oilers | 1979–80 | Loss | 60 | 4 | 4.00 | |
| Brian Eklund | Tampa Bay Lightning | 2005–06 | Loss | 58 | 3 | 3.09 | |
| Joacim Eriksson | Vancouver Canucks | 2013–14 | No decision | 36 | 6 | 9.99 | |
| Olle Eriksson Ek | Anaheim Ducks | 2022–23 | Overtime loss | 64 | 5 | 4.69 | |
| Brian Foster | Florida Panthers | 2011–12 | No decision | 5 | 0 | 0.00 | |
| Scott Foster | Chicago Blackhawks | 2017–18 | No decision | 15 | 0 | 0.00 | |
| Jeff Frazee | New Jersey Devils | 2012–13 | No decision | 19 | 0 | 0.00 | |
| Kaden Fulcher | Detroit Red Wings | 2018–19 | No decision | 28 | 2 | 4.44 | |
| Paul Gauthier | Montreal Canadiens | 1937–38 | Tie | 70 | 2 | 1.71 | |
| Sean Gauthier | San Jose Sharks | 1998–99 | No decision | 3 | 0 | 0.00 | |
| Harrison Gray | Detroit Red Wings | 1963–64 | Loss | 40 | 5 | 7.50 | |
| Adam Hauser | Los Angeles Kings | 2005–06 | No decision | 51 | 6 | 7.08 | |
| Cal Heeter | Philadelphia Flyers | 2013–14 | Shootout loss | 64 | 5 | 4.69 | |
| Riku Helenius | Tampa Bay Lightning | 2008–09 | No decision | 7 | 0 | 0.00 | |
| Tom Hodges | Anaheim Ducks | 2021–22 | Loss | 19 | 1 | 3.11 | |
| Martin Houle | Philadelphia Flyers | 2006–07 | No decision | 2 | 1 | 27.27 | |
| Shawn Hunwick | Columbus Blue Jackets | 2011–12 | No decision | 3 | 0 | 0.00 | |
| Adam Húska | New York Rangers | 2021–22 | Loss | 59 | 7 | 7.04 | |
| Robbie Irons | St. Louis Blues | 1968–69 | No decision | 3 | 0 | 0.00 | |
| Pauli Jaks | Los Angeles Kings | 1994–95 | No decision | 40 | 2 | 3.00 | |
| Joe Junkin | Boston Bruins | 1968–69 | No decision | 8 | 0 | 0.00 | |
| Jason Kasdorf | Buffalo Sabres | 2015–16 | Loss | 60 | 4 | 4.00 | |
| Don Keenan | Boston Bruins | 1958–59 | Loss | 60 | 4 | 4.00 | |
| Matt Keetley | Calgary Flames | 2007–08 | No decision | 9 | 0 | 0.00 | |
| Julian Klymkiw | New York Rangers | 1958–59 | No decision | 19 | 2 | 6.32 | |
| Brent Krahn | Dallas Stars | 2008–09 | No decision | 20 | 3 | 9.00 | |
| Rick LaFerriere | Colorado Rockies | 1981–82 | No decision | 20 | 1 | 3.00 | |
| Simon Lajeunesse | Ottawa Senators | 2001–02 | No decision | 24 | 0 | 0.00 | |
| Ray LeBlanc | Chicago Blackhawks | 1991–92 | Win | 60 | 1 | 1.00 | |
| Tristan Lennox | New York Islanders | 2024–25† | No decision | 5 | 1 | 12.72 | |
| Jean-Louis Levasseur | Minnesota North Stars | 1979–80 | Loss | 60 | 7 | 7.00 | |
| Ron Loustel | Winnipeg Jets | 1980–81 | Loss | 60 | 10 | 10.00 | |
| Andrey Makarov | Buffalo Sabres | 2014–15 | Loss | 60 | 3 | 3.00 | |
| Tom McGrattan | Detroit Red Wings | 1947–48 | No decision | 8 | 1 | 7.50 | |
| Ross McKay | Hartford Whalers | 1990–91 | No decision | 35 | 3 | 5.17 | |
| Steve McKichan | Vancouver Canucks | 1990–91 | No decision | 20 | 2 | 6.00 | |
| Michael McNiven | Montreal Canadiens | 2021–22 | No decision | 20 | 3 | 9.00 | |
| Rob McVicar | Vancouver Canucks | 2005–06 | No decision | 3 | 0 | 0.00 | |
| Olivier Michaud | Montreal Canadiens | 2001–02 | No decision | 18 | 0 | 0.00 | |
| Mike Minard | Edmonton Oilers | 1999–2000 | Win | 60 | 3 | 3.00 | |
| Jean-Guy Morissette | Montreal Canadiens | 1963–64 | Loss | 36 | 4 | 6.67 | |
| Jerome Mrazek | Philadelphia Flyers | 1975–76 | No decision | 6 | 1 | 10.00 | |
| Hal Murphy | Montreal Canadiens | 1952–53 | Win | 60 | 4 | 4.00 | |
| Mickey Murray | Montreal Canadiens | 1929–30 | Loss | 60 | 4 | 4.00 | |
| Matt O'Connor | Ottawa Senators | 2015–16 | Loss | 58 | 3 | 3.10 | |
| Dan Olesevich | New York Rangers | 1961–62 | Tie | 29 | 2 | 4.14 | |
| Ted Ouimet | St. Louis Blues | 1968–69 | Loss | 60 | 2 | 2.00 | |
| Paul Pageau | Los Angeles Kings | 1980–81 | Loss | 60 | 8 | 8.00 | |
| Alexander Pechursky | Pittsburgh Penguins | 2009–10 | No decision | 36 | 1 | 1.69 | |
| Timo Pielmeier | Anaheim Ducks | 2010–11 | Loss | 40 | 5 | 7.50 | |
| Erik Portillo | Los Angeles Kings | 2024–25† | Win | 58 | 1 | 1.02 | |
| Chris Pusey | Detroit Red Wings | 1985–86 | No decision | 40 | 3 | 4.50 | |
| Jamie Ram | New York Rangers | 1995–96 | No decision | 27 | 0 | 0.00 | |
| Alain Raymond | Washington Capitals | 1987–88 | Loss | 39 | 2 | 3.06 | |
| Greg Redquest | Pittsburgh Penguins | 1977–78 | No decision | 13 | 3 | 13.85 | |
| Bob Ring | Boston Bruins | 1965–66 | No decision | 33 | 4 | 7.27 | |
| Mike Rosati | Washington Capitals | 1998–99 | Win | 28 | 0 | 0.00 | |
| Cody Rudkowsky | St. Louis Blues | 2002–03 | Win | 30 | 0 | 0.00 | |
| Pat Rupp | Detroit Red Wings | 1963–64 | Loss | 60 | 4 | 4.00 | |
| Travis Scott | Los Angeles Kings | 2000–01 | No decision | 25 | 3 | 7.28 | |
| Scott Sharples | Calgary Flames | 1991–92 | Tie | 65 | 4 | 3.69 | |
| Jordan Sigalet | Boston Bruins | 2005–06 | No decision | 1 | 0 | 0.00 | |
| Kent Simpson | Chicago Blackhawks | 2013–14 | No decision | 20 | 2 | 6.00 | |
| Christian Soucy | Chicago Blackhawks | 1993–94 | No decision | 3 | 0 | 0.00 | |
| Red Spooner | Pittsburgh Pirates | 1929–30 | Loss | 60 | 6 | 6.00 | |
| Phil Stein | Toronto Maple Leafs | 1939–40 | Tie | 70 | 2 | 1.71 | |
| Jim Stewart | Boston Bruins | 1979–80 | Loss | 20 | 5 | 15.00 | |
| Aleš Stezka | Seattle Kraken | 2024–25† | Loss | 58 | 3 | 3.09 | |
| Iiro Tarkki | Anaheim Ducks | 2011–12 | Win | 41 | 3 | 4.41 | |
| Joe Turner | Detroit Red Wings | 1941–42 | Tie | 70 | 3 | 2.57 | |
| Matt Underhill | Chicago Blackhawks | 2003–04 | Loss | 60 | 4 | 3.95 | |
| Veini Vehviläinen | Columbus Blue Jackets | 2020–21 | No decision | 11 | 1 | 5.63 | |
| Mark Visentin | Phoenix Coyotes | 2013–14 | Loss | 59 | 3 | 3.06 | |
| Jim Watt | St. Louis Blues | 1973–74 | No decision | 20 | 2 | 6.00 | |
| Tyler Weiman | Colorado Avalanche | 2007–08 | No decision | 16 | 0 | 0.00 | |
| Dylan Wells | Chicago Blackhawks | 2022–23 | No decision | 20 | 1 | 3.00 | |
| Adam Wilcox | Buffalo Sabres | 2017–18 | Loss | 39 | 0 | 0.00 | |
| Roman Will | Colorado Avalanche | 2015–16 | No decision | 18 | 1 | 3.25 | |
| Jordan Willis | Dallas Stars | 1995–96 | Loss | 19 | 1 | 3.20 | |
| Alex Wood | New York Americans | 1936–37 | Loss | 70 | 3 | 2.57 | |
| Matt Zaba | New York Rangers | 2009–10 | No decision | 34 | 2 | 3.56 | |
| Artyom Zagidulin | Calgary Flames | 2020–21 | No decision | 28 | 2 | 4.25 | |

== Skaters ==
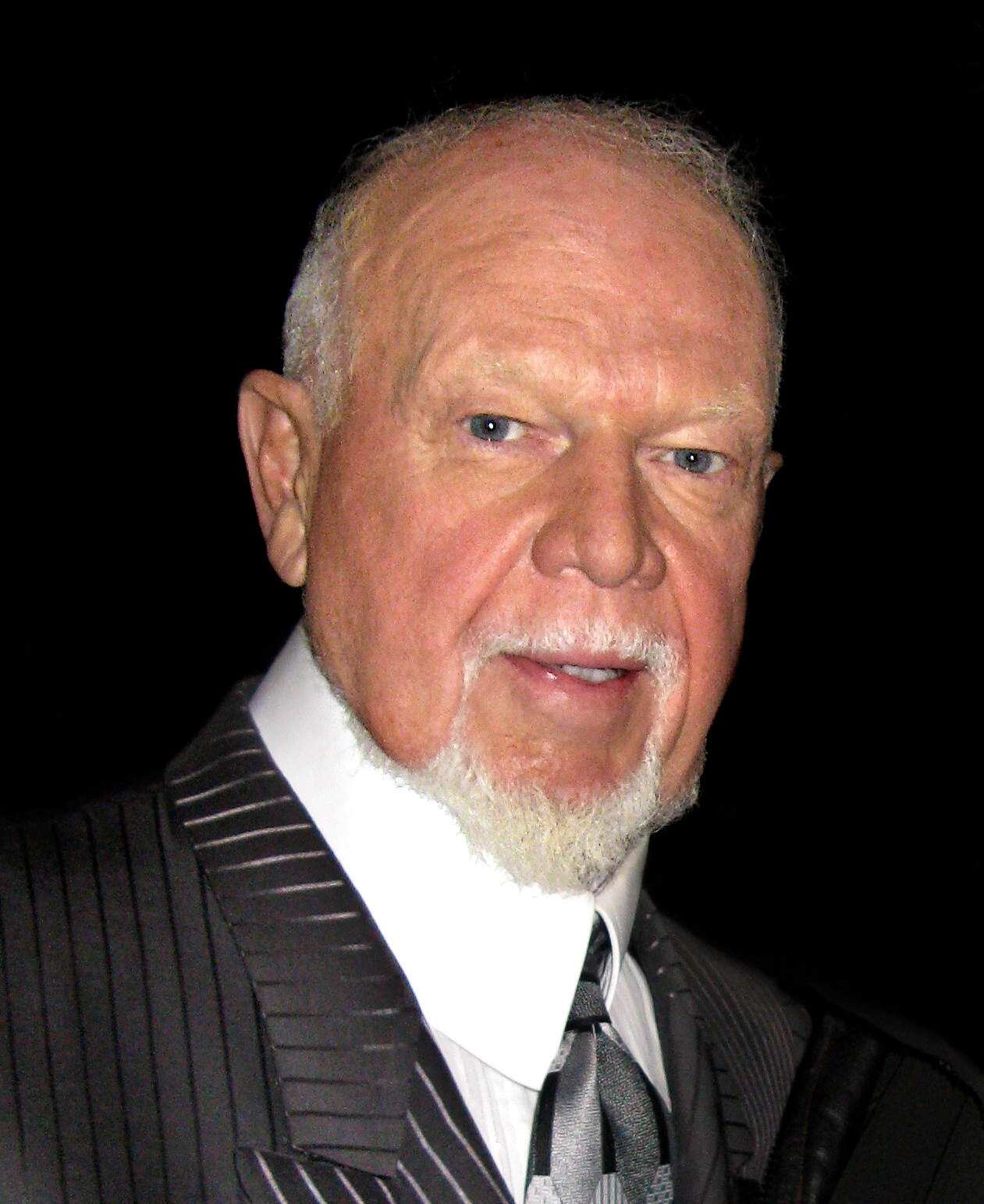
Don Cherry

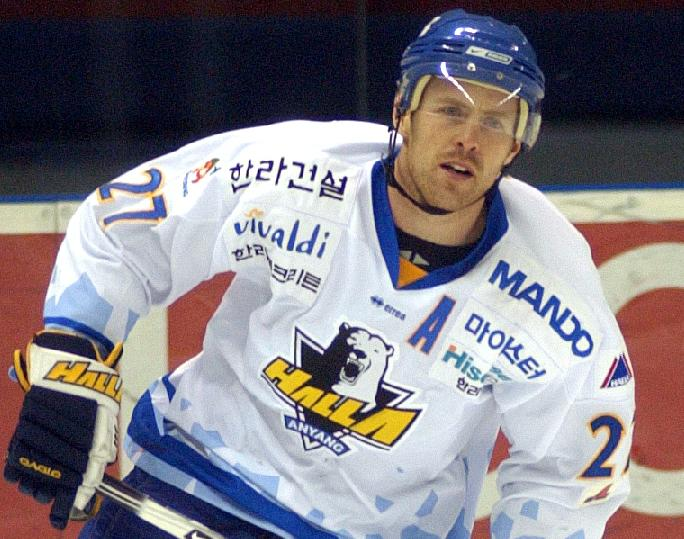
Brad Fast

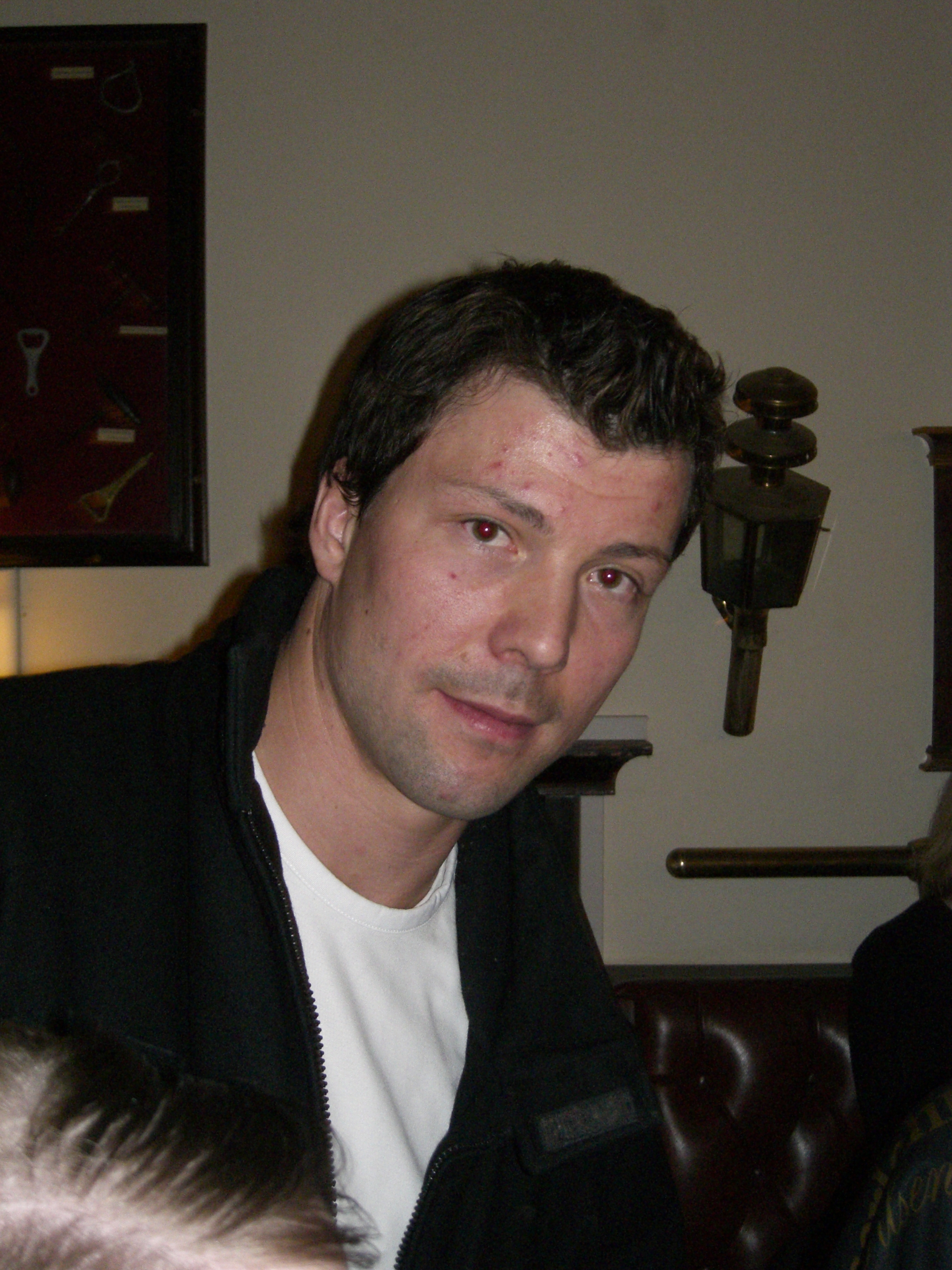
Erich Goldmann

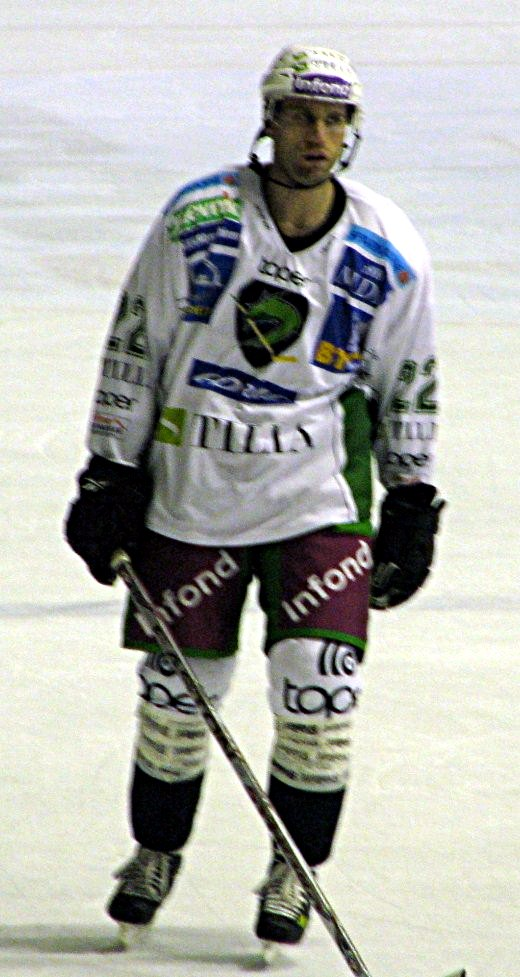
Greg Kuznik

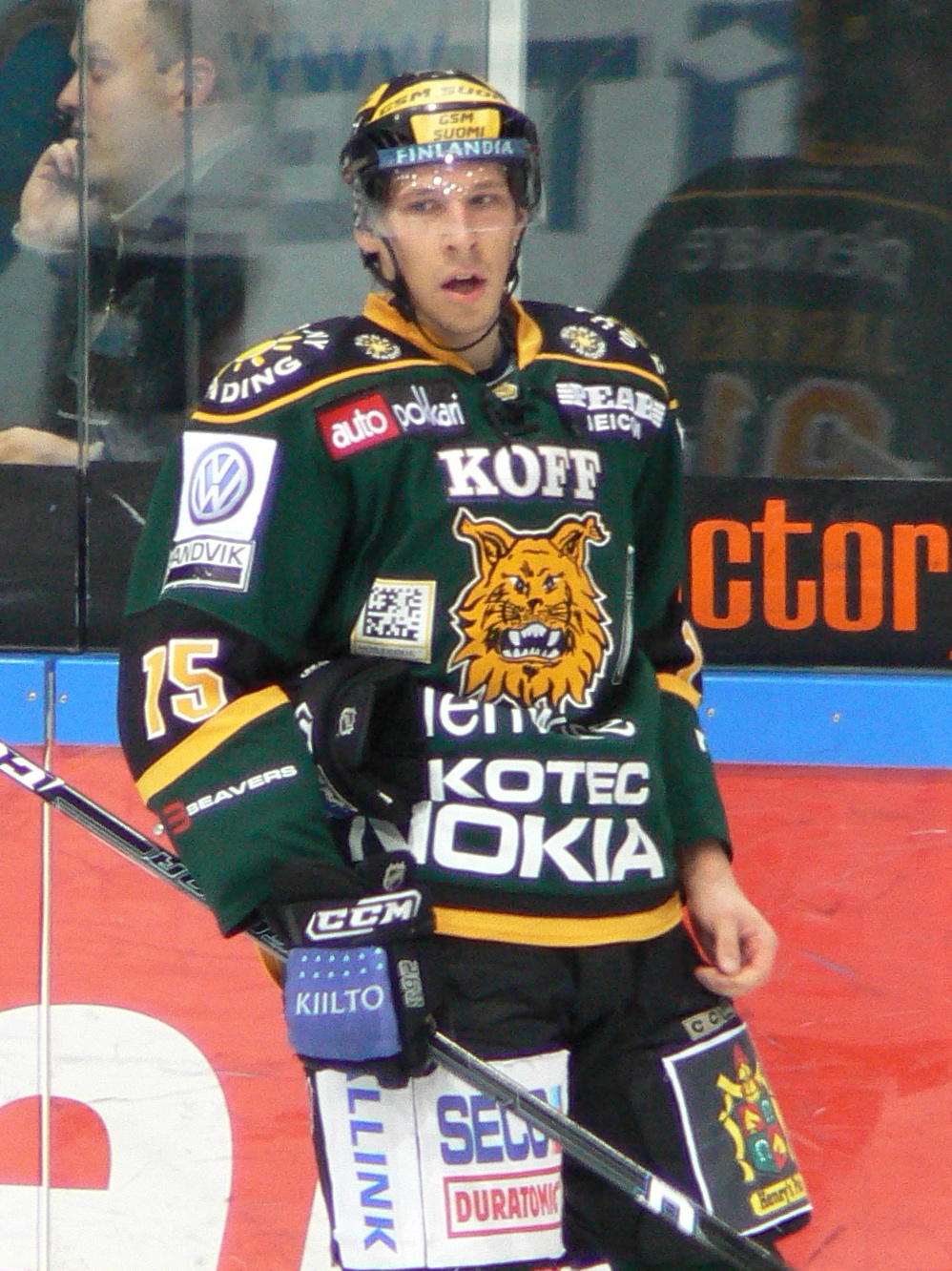
Masi Marjamaki

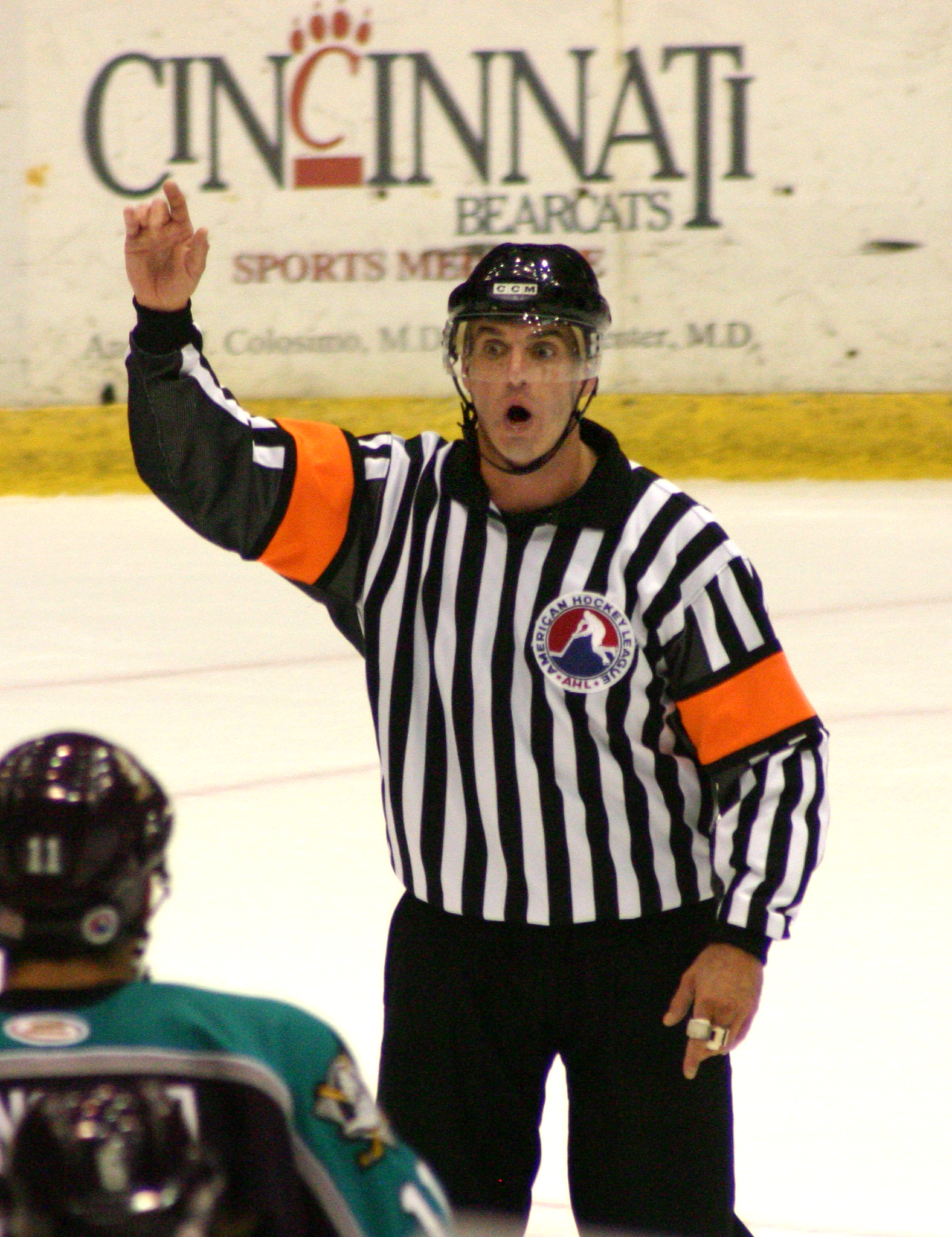
Dean Morton

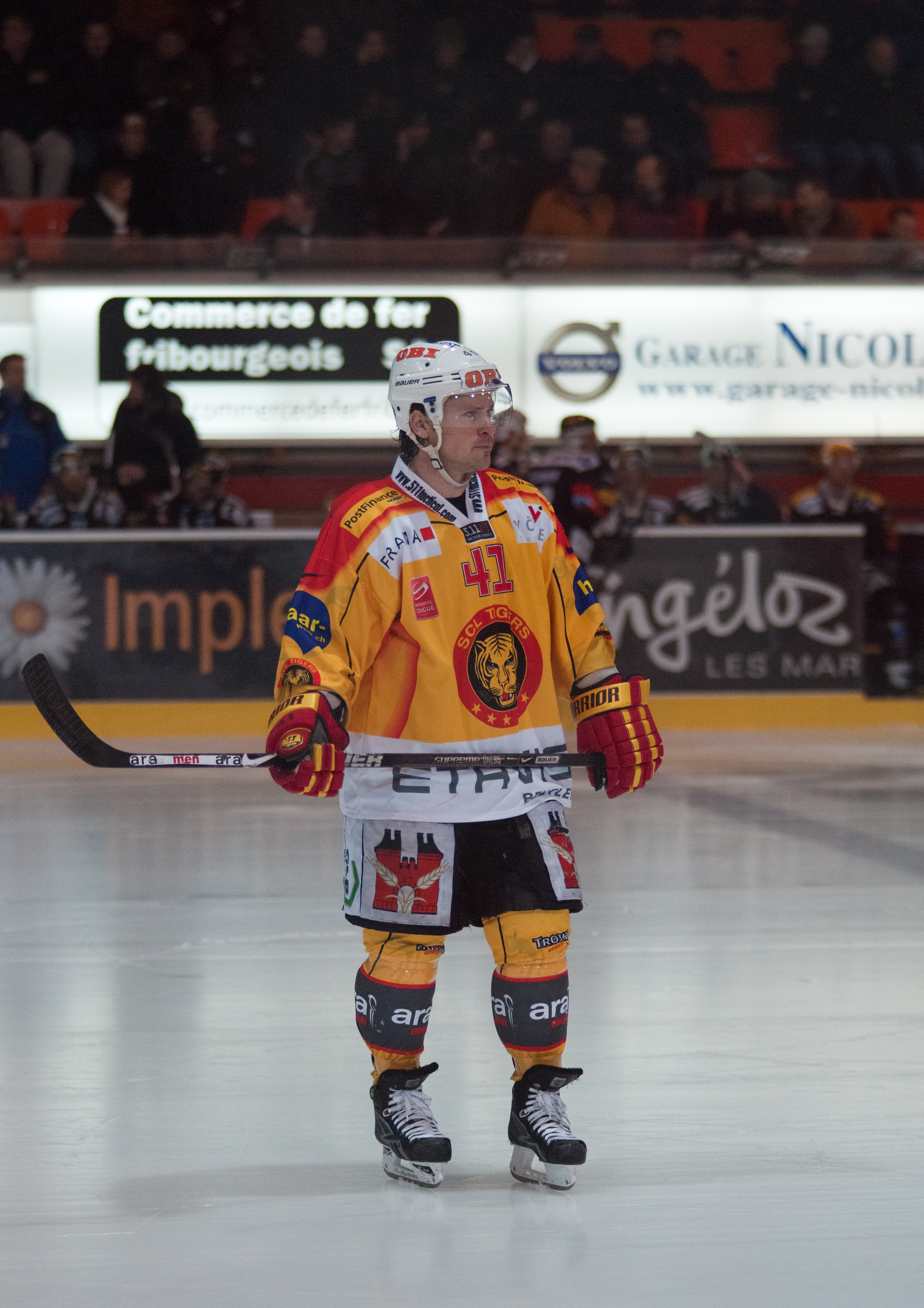
Curtis Murphy

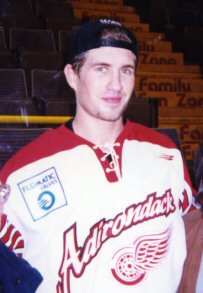
B. J. Young

Defencemen and forwards who played in only one NHL regular season or playoff game
| Name | Pos | Team | Season | G | A | Pts | PIM | Ref |
|---|---|---|---|---|---|---|---|---|
| Gerry Abel | LW | Detroit Red Wings | 1966–67 | 0 | 0 | 0 | 0 | |
| Rudy Ahlin | LW | Chicago Black Hawks | 1937–38 | 0 | 0 | 0 | 0 | |
| Red Anderson | D | Boston Bruins | 1942–43‡ | 0 | 0 | 0 | 0 | |
| Steve Andrascik | RW | New York Rangers | 1971–72‡ | 0 | 0 | 0 | 0 | |
| Alexander Andrijevski | RW | Chicago Blackhawks | 1992–93 | 0 | 0 | 0 | 0 | |
| Darrel Anholt | D | Chicago Black Hawks | 1983–84 | 0 | 0 | 0 | 0 | |
| Bill Armstrong | LW | Philadelphia Flyers | 1990–91 | 0 | 1 | 1 | 0 | |
| Jamie Arniel | C | Boston Bruins | 2010–11 | 0 | 0 | 0 | 0 | |
| Bill Arnold | C | Calgary Flames | 2013–14 | 0 | 0 | 0 | 0 | |
| Brandon Baddock | LW | Montreal Canadiens | 2021–22 | 0 | 0 | 0 | 0 | |
| Ivan Baranka | D | New York Rangers | 2007–08 | 0 | 1 | 1 | 0 | |
| Andy Barbe | RW | Toronto Maple Leafs | 1950–51 | 0 | 0 | 0 | 2 | |
| Blair Barnes | RW | Los Angeles Kings | 1982–83 | 0 | 0 | 0 | 0 | |
| Harry Bell | RW | New York Rangers | 1946–47 | 0 | 1 | 1 | 0 | |
| Max Bennett | RW | Montreal Canadiens | 1935–36 | 0 | 0 | 0 | 0 | |
| Sean Bentivoglio | LW | New York Islanders | 2008–09 | 0 | 0 | 0 | 2 | |
| Jesse Blacker | D | Anaheim Ducks | 2014–15 | 0 | 0 | 0 | 0 | |
| Garry Blaine | RW | Montreal Canadiens | 1954–55 | 0 | 0 | 0 | 0 | |
| Chuck Blair | RW | Toronto Maple Leafs | 1948–49 | 0 | 0 | 0 | 0 | |
| Ken Block | D | Vancouver Canucks | 1970–71 | 0 | 0 | 0 | 0 | |
| Danny Bois | RW | Ottawa Senators | 2006–07 | 0 | 0 | 0 | 7 | |
| Jack Borotsik | LW | St. Louis Blues | 1974–75 | 0 | 0 | 0 | 0 | |
| Dick Bouchard | RW | New York Rangers | 1954–55 | 0 | 0 | 0 | 0 | |
| Ryan Bourque | C | New York Rangers | 2014–15 | 0 | 0 | 0 | 0 | |
| Darren Boyko | C | Winnipeg Jets | 1988–89 | 0 | 0 | 0 | 0 | |
| Bart Bradley | C | Boston Bruins | 1949–50 | 0 | 0 | 0 | 0 | |
| Stephane Brochu | D | New York Rangers | 1988–89 | 0 | 0 | 0 | 0 | |
| Cam Brown | LW | Vancouver Canucks | 1990–91 | 0 | 0 | 0 | 7 | |
| Frederic Brunet | D | Boston Bruins | 2024–25† | 0 | 0 | 0 | 0 | |
| Mike Buchanan | D | Chicago Black Hawks | 1951–52 | 0 | 0 | 0 | 0 | |
| Cameron Butler | RW | Columbus Blue Jackets | 2023–24 | 0 | 0 | 0 | 0 | |
| Gord Byers | D | Boston Bruins | 1949–50 | 0 | 1 | 1 | 0 | |
| Matt Campanale | D | New York Islanders | 2010–11 | 0 | 0 | 0 | 2 | |
| Darcy Campbell | D | Columbus Blue Jackets | 2006–07 | 0 | 0 | 0 | 0 | |
| Claude Cardin | LW | St. Louis Blues | 1967–68 | 0 | 0 | 0 | 0 | |
| William Chalmers | C | New York Rangers | 1953–54 | 0 | 0 | 0 | 0 | |
| Dave Chartier | C | Winnipeg Jets | 1980–81 | 0 | 0 | 0 | 0 | |
| Mike Chernoff | LW | Minnesota North Stars | 1968–69 | 0 | 0 | 0 | 0 | |
| Don Cherry | D | Boston Bruins | 1954–55‡ | 0 | 0 | 0 | 0 | |
| Colin Chisholm | D | Minnesota North Stars | 1986–87 | 0 | 0 | 0 | 0 | |
| Jozef Cierny | LW | Edmonton Oilers | 1993–94 | 0 | 0 | 0 | 0 | |
| Dean Clark | LW | Edmonton Oilers | 1983–84 | 0 | 0 | 0 | 0 | |
| Nathan Clurman | D | Pittsburgh Penguins | 2024–25† | 0 | 0 | 0 | 2 | |
| Tom Colley | C | Minnesota North Stars | 1974–75 | 0 | 0 | 0 | 2 | |
| Norman Collings | LW | Montreal Canadiens | 1934–35 | 0 | 1 | 1 | 0 | |
| Roger Cormier | RW | Montreal Canadiens | 1925–26 | 0 | 0 | 0 | 0 | |
| Greg Crozier | LW | Pittsburgh Penguins | 2000–01 | 0 | 0 | 0 | 0 | |
| Tyler Cuma | D | Minnesota Wild | 2011–12 | 0 | 0 | 0 | 2 | |
| Jim Cunningham | LW | Philadelphia Flyers | 1977–78 | 0 | 0 | 0 | 4 | |
| Hugh Currie | D | Montreal Canadiens | 1950–51 | 0 | 0 | 0 | 0 | |
| Ken Davies | C | New York Rangers | 1947–48‡ | 0 | 0 | 0 | 0 | |
| Murray Davison | D | Boston Bruins | 1965–66 | 0 | 0 | 0 | 0 | |
| Jeff Daw | C | Colorado Avalanche | 2001–02 | 0 | 1 | 1 | 0 | |
| Jonathan Delisle | RW | Montreal Canadiens | 1998–99 | 0 | 0 | 0 | 0 | |
| Armand Delmonte | RW | Boston Bruins | 1945–46 | 0 | 0 | 0 | 0 | |
| Val Delory | LW | New York Rangers | 1948–49 | 0 | 0 | 0 | 0 | |
| Semyon Der-Arguchintsev | C | Toronto Maple Leafs | 2022–23 | 0 | 0 | 0 | 0 | |
| Michel Deziel | LW | Buffalo Sabres | 1974–75‡ | 0 | 0 | 0 | 0 | |
| Gary Donaldson | RW | Chicago Black Hawks | 1973–74 | 0 | 0 | 0 | 0 | |
| Jamie Doornbosch | D | New York Islanders | 2010–11 | 0 | 0 | 0 | 0 | |
| Bruce Draper | C | Toronto Maple Leafs | 1962–63 | 0 | 0 | 0 | 0 | |
| William Dufour | RW | New York Islanders | 2022–23 | 0 | 0 | 0 | 0 | |
| Ken Duggan | D | Minnesota North Stars | 1987–88 | 0 | 0 | 0 | 0 | |
| Brodie Dupont | LW | New York Rangers | 2010–11 | 0 | 0 | 0 | 0 | |
| Henry Dyck | C | New York Rangers | 1943–44 | 0 | 0 | 0 | 0 | |
| Jeff Eatough | RW | Buffalo Sabres | 1981–82 | 0 | 0 | 0 | 0 | |
| Trevor Fahey | LW | New York Rangers | 1964–65 | 0 | 0 | 0 | 0 | |
| John Farinacci | C | Boston Bruins | 2024–25† | 1 | 0 | 1 | 0 | |
| Walt Farrant | RW | Chicago Black Hawks | 1943–44 | 0 | 0 | 0 | 0 | |
| Brad Fast | D | Carolina Hurricanes | 2003–04 | 1 | 0 | 1 | 0 | |
| Marcel Fillion | LW | Boston Bruins | 1944–45 | 0 | 0 | 0 | 0 | |
| Giovanni Fiore | LW | Anaheim Ducks | 2017–18 | 0 | 0 | 0 | 0 | |
| Peter Fiorentino | D | New York Rangers | 1991–92 | 0 | 0 | 0 | 0 | |
| Zack Fitzgerald | D | Vancouver Canucks | 2007–08 | 0 | 0 | 0 | 0 | |
| Alex Forsyth | C | Washington Capitals | 1976–77 | 0 | 0 | 0 | 0 | |
| Kris Foucault | LW | Minnesota Wild | 2011–12 | 0 | 0 | 0 | 0 | |
| Charles Fraser | D | Hamilton Tigers | 1923–24 | 0 | 0 | 0 | 0 | |
| Jamie Fraser | D | New York Islanders | 2008–09 | 0 | 0 | 0 | 0 | |
| Alex Friesen | C | Vancouver Canucks | 2015–16 | 0 | 0 | 0 | 0 | |
| Jamie Fritsch | D | Philadelphia Flyers | 2008–09 | 0 | 0 | 0 | 0 | |
| Rob Garner | C | Pittsburgh Penguins | 1982–83 | 0 | 0 | 0 | 0 | |
| Bob Geale | C | Pittsburgh Penguins | 1984–85 | 0 | 0 | 0 | 2 | |
| Chay Genoway | D | Minnesota Wild | 2011–12 | 0 | 1 | 1 | 0 | |
| Damien Giroux | C | Minnesota Wild | 2022–23 | 0 | 1 | 1 | 2 | |
| Farrand Gillie | LW | Detroit Cougars | 1928–29 | 0 | 0 | 0 | 0 | |
| Scott Glennie | RW | Dallas Stars | 2011–12 | 0 | 0 | 0 | 2 | |
| Erich Goldmann | D | Ottawa Senators | 1999–2000 | 0 | 0 | 0 | 0 | |
| Stanislav Gron | C | New Jersey Devils | 2000–01 | 0 | 0 | 0 | 0 | |
| Wayne Groulx | C | Quebec Nordiques | 1984–85 | 0 | 0 | 0 | 0 | |
| Francois Guay | C | Buffalo Sabres | 1989–90 | 0 | 0 | 0 | 0 | |
| Gordon Haidy | RW | Detroit Red Wings | 1949–50‡ | 0 | 0 | 0 | 0 | |
| Curtis Hamilton | LW | Edmonton Oilers | 2014–15 | 0 | 0 | 0 | 5 | |
| Scott Harlow | LW | St. Louis Blues | 1987–88 | 0 | 1 | 1 | 0 | |
| Neil Hawryliw | RW | New York Islanders | 1981–82 | 0 | 0 | 0 | 0 | |
| Peter Hayek | C | Minnesota North Stars | 1981–82 | 0 | 0 | 0 | 0 | |
| Chris Hayes | LW | Boston Bruins | 1971–72‡ | 0 | 0 | 0 | 0 | |
| Steve Hazlett | C | Vancouver Canucks | 1979–80 | 0 | 0 | 0 | 0 | |
| Galen Head | RW | Detroit Red Wings | 1967–68 | 0 | 0 | 0 | 0 | |
| Rich Healey | D | Detroit Red Wings | 1960–61 | 0 | 0 | 0 | 2 | |
| Shawn Heaphy | C | Calgary Flames | 1992–93 | 0 | 0 | 0 | 0 | |
| Samuel Henley | C | Colorado Avalanche | 2016–17 | 1 | 0 | 1 | 2 | |
| Yves Heroux | RW | Quebec Nordiques | 1986–87 | 0 | 0 | 0 | 0 | |
| Jason Herter | D | New York Islanders | 1995–96 | 0 | 1 | 1 | 0 | |
| Greg Hickey | LW | New York Rangers | 1977–78 | 0 | 0 | 0 | 0 | |
| Cameron Hillis | C | Montreal Canadiens | 2021–22 | 0 | 0 | 0 | 0 | |
| Justin Hocking | D | Los Angeles Kings | 1993–94 | 0 | 0 | 0 | 0 | |
| Bud Holloway | C | Montreal Canadiens | 2015–16 | 0 | 0 | 0 | 0 | |
| Philip Holm | D | Vancouver Canucks | 2017–18 | 0 | 0 | 0 | 0 | |
| Ron Homenuke | RW | Vancouver Canucks | 1972–73 | 0 | 0 | 0 | 0 | |
| Raman Hrabarenka | D | New Jersey Devils | 2014–15 | 0 | 0 | 0 | 0 | |
| Roland Huard | C | Toronto Maple Leafs | 1930–31 | 1 | 0 | 1 | 0 | |
| Jamie Hunt | D | Washington Capitals | 2006–07 | 0 | 0 | 0 | 0 | |
| Bob Hurlburt | LW | Vancouver Canucks | 1974–75 | 0 | 0 | 0 | 2 | |
| Paul Hurley | D | Boston Bruins | 1968–69 | 0 | 1 | 1 | 0 | |
| Ryan Huska | LW | Chicago Blackhawks | 1997–98 | 0 | 0 | 0 | 0 | |
| Jack Ingram | C | Boston Bruins | 1924–25 | 0 | 0 | 0 | 0 | |
| Ruslan Iskhakov | C | New York Islanders | 2023–24 | 0 | 1 | 1 | 0 | |
| Scott Jackson | D | Tampa Bay Lightning | 2009–10 | 0 | 0 | 0 | 0 | |
| Paul Jacobs | D | Toronto Arenas | 1918–19 | 0 | 0 | 0 | 0 | |
| James Jamieson | D | New York Rangers | 1943–44 | 0 | 1 | 1 | 0 | |
| Cole Jarrett | LW | New York Islanders | 2005–06 | 0 | 0 | 0 | 0 | |
| Martti Jarventie | D | Montreal Canadiens | 2001–02 | 0 | 0 | 0 | 0 | |
| Bill Johansen | C | Toronto Maple Leafs | 1949–50 | 0 | 0 | 0 | 0 | |
| Jonas Johansson | RW | Washington Capitals | 2005–06 | 0 | 0 | 0 | 2 | |
| Earl Johnson | LW | Detroit Red Wings | 1953–54 | 0 | 0 | 0 | 0 | |
| Marc Johnstone | RW | Pittsburgh Penguins | 2023–24 | 0 | 0 | 0 | 0 | |
| Mikko Jokela | D | Vancouver Canucks | 2002–03 | 0 | 0 | 0 | 0 | |
| Rene Joliat | RW | Montreal Canadiens | 1924–25 | 0 | 0 | 0 | 0 | |
| Andrew Joudrey | C | Columbus Blue Jackets | 2011–12 | 0 | 0 | 0 | 0 | |
| Trent Kaese | RW | Buffalo Sabres | 1988–89 | 0 | 0 | 0 | 0 | |
| Devin Kaplan | RW | Philadelphia Flyers | 2024–25† | 0 | 0 | 0 | 0 | |
| Mike Keating | LW | New York Rangers | 1977–78 | 0 | 0 | 0 | 0 | |
| Chris Kelleher | D | Boston Bruins | 2001–02 | 0 | 0 | 0 | 0 | |
| Philip Kemp | D | Edmonton Oilers | 2023–24 | 0 | 0 | 0 | 0 | |
| Stan Kemp | D | Toronto Maple Leafs | 1948–49 | 0 | 0 | 0 | 2 | |
| Michael Keranen | LW | Minnesota Wild | 2015–16 | 0 | 0 | 0 | 0 | |
| Udo Kiessling | D | Minnesota North Stars | 1981–82 | 0 | 0 | 0 | 2 | |
| Bryce Kindopp | RW | Anaheim Ducks | 2021–22 | 0 | 0 | 0 | 0 | |
| Geoff Kinrade | RW | Tampa Bay Lightning | 2008–09 | 0 | 0 | 0 | 0 | |
| Anton Klementyev | D | New York Islanders | 2009–10 | 0 | 0 | 0 | 0 | |
| Morgan Klimchuk | LW | Calgary Flames | 2017–18 | 0 | 0 | 0 | 0 | |
| Sergei Klimovich | C | Chicago Blackhawks | 1996–97 | 0 | 0 | 0 | 2 | |
| Artemi Kniazev | D | San Jose Sharks | 2021–22 | 0 | 0 | 0 | 0 | |
| Paul Knox | RW | Toronto Maple Leafs | 1954–55 | 0 | 0 | 0 | 0 | |
| Patrik Koch | D | Arizona Coyotes | 2023–24 | 0 | 0 | 0 | 10 | |
| Greg Koehler | C | Carolina Hurricanes | 2000–01 | 0 | 0 | 0 | 0 | |
| Dick Kotanen | D | New York Rangers | 1950–51 | 0 | 0 | 0 | 0 | |
| Yegor Korshkov | RW | Toronto Maple Leafs | 2019–20 | 1 | 0 | 1 | 0 | |
| Cody Kunyk | RW | Tampa Bay Lightning | 2013–14 | 0 | 0 | 0 | 0 | |
| Greg Kuznik | D | Carolina Hurricanes | 2000–01 | 0 | 0 | 0 | 0 | |
| Larry Kwong | RW | New York Rangers | 1947–48 | 0 | 0 | 0 | 0 | |
| Milan Kytnar | C | Edmonton Oilers | 2011–12 | 0 | 0 | 0 | 0 | |
| Rene Lafleur | LW | Montreal Canadiens | 1924–25 | 0 | 0 | 0 | 0 | |
| Ernie Laforce | D | Montreal Canadiens | 1942–43 | 0 | 0 | 0 | 0 | |
| Rob Laird | LW | Minnesota North Stars | 1979–80 | 0 | 0 | 0 | 0 | |
| Shawn Lalonde | D | Chicago Blackhawks | 2012–13 | 0 | 0 | 0 | 0 | |
| Tyler Larter | C | Washington Capitals | 1989–90 | 0 | 0 | 0 | 0 | |
| James Latos | RW | New York Rangers | 1988–89 | 0 | 0 | 0 | 0 | |
| Eric Lavigne | D | Los Angeles Kings | 1994–95 | 0 | 0 | 0 | 0 | |
| Peter LeBlanc | C | Washington Capitals | 2013–14 | 0 | 0 | 0 | 0 | |
| Bobby Lee | C | Montreal Canadiens | 1942–43 | 0 | 0 | 0 | 0 | |
| Scott Lehman | D | Atlanta Thrashers | 2008–09 | 0 | 0 | 0 | 0 | |
| Grant Lewis | D | Atlanta Thrashers | 2008–09 | 0 | 0 | 0 | 0 | |
| Jeff Libby | D | New York Islanders | 1997–98 | 0 | 0 | 0 | 0 | |
| Perttu Lindgren | C | Dallas Stars | 2009–10 | 0 | 0 | 0 | 0 | |
| Jon Lizotte | D | Minnesota Wild | 2021–22 | 0 | 0 | 0 | 2 | |
| Viktor Lodin | C | Ottawa Senators | 2021–22 | 0 | 0 | 0 | 0 | |
| Ken Lovsin | D | Washington Capitals | 1990–91 | 0 | 0 | 0 | 0 | |
| Dave Lucas | D | Detroit Red Wings | 1962–63 | 0 | 0 | 0 | 0 | |
| Brian Lundberg | D | Pittsburgh Penguins | 1982–83 | 0 | 0 | 0 | 2 | |
| Brett MacDonald | D | Vancouver Canucks | 1987–88 | 0 | 0 | 0 | 0 | |
| Kevin MacDonald | D | Ottawa Senators | 1993–94 | 0 | 0 | 0 | 2 | |
| Kim MacDougall | D | Minnesota North Stars | 1974–75 | 0 | 0 | 0 | 0 | |
| Shane MacEachern | C | St. Louis Blues | 1987–88 | 0 | 0 | 0 | 0 | |
| Blair MacKasey | D | Toronto Maple Leafs | 1976–77 | 0 | 0 | 0 | 2 | |
| Frank Mailley | D | Montreal Canadiens | 1942–43 | 0 | 0 | 0 | 0 | |
| Tomi Maki | RW | Calgary Flames | 2006–07 | 0 | 0 | 0 | 0 | |
| Ken Mann | RW | Detroit Red Wings | 1975–76 | 0 | 0 | 0 | 0 | |
| Masi Marjamäki | LW | New York Islanders | 2005–06 | 0 | 0 | 0 | 0 | |
| Jack Martin | C | Toronto Maple Leafs | 1960–61 | 0 | 0 | 0 | 0 | |
| Pat Mayer | D | Pittsburgh Penguins | 1987–88 | 0 | 0 | 0 | 4 | |
| Jim McBurney | LW | Chicago Black Hawks | 1952–53 | 0 | 1 | 1 | 0 | |
| John McCahill | D | Colorado Rockies | 1977–78 | 0 | 0 | 0 | 0 | |
| Bob McCulley | RW | Montreal Canadiens | 1934–35 | 0 | 0 | 0 | 0 | |
| Darwin McCutcheon | D | Toronto Maple Leafs | 1981–82 | 0 | 0 | 0 | 2 | |
| Jeff McDill | RW | Chicago Black Hawks | 1976–77 | 0 | 0 | 0 | 0 | |
| Bob McDonald | RW | New York Rangers | 1943–44 | 0 | 0 | 0 | 0 | |
| Evan McEneny | D | Vancouver Canucks | 2016–17 | 0 | 0 | 0 | 0 | |
| Irving McGibbon | RW | Montreal Canadiens | 1942–43 | 0 | 0 | 0 | 2 | |
| Doug McKay | LW | Detroit Red Wings | 1949–50‡ | 0 | 0 | 0 | 0 | |
| Scott McKay | RW | Mighty Ducks of Anaheim | 1993–94 | 0 | 0 | 0 | 0 | |
| Sean McMorrow | RW | Buffalo Sabres | 2002–03 | 0 | 0 | 0 | 0 | |
| George McNaughton | RW | Quebec Bulldogs | 1919–20 | 0 | 0 | 0 | 0 | |
| Hillary Menard | LW | Chicago Black Hawks | 1953–54 | 0 | 0 | 0 | 0 | |
| John Michaluk | LW | Chicago Black Hawks | 1950–51 | 0 | 0 | 0 | 0 | |
| Michael Milne | LW | Minnesota Wild | 2024–25† | 0 | 0 | 0 | 0 | |
| Daniil Misyul | D | New Jersey Devils | 2024–25† | 0 | 0 | 0 | 0 | |
| Bill Mitchell | D | Detroit Red Wings | 1963–64 | 0 | 0 | 0 | 0 | |
| Garrett Mitchell | RW | Washington Capitals | 2016–17 | 0 | 0 | 0 | 0 | |
| Lloyd Mohns | D | New York Rangers | 1943–44 | 0 | 0 | 0 | 0 | |
| David Moravec | RW | Buffalo Sabres | 1999–2000 | 0 | 0 | 0 | 0 | |
| Joey Mormina | D | Carolina Hurricanes | 2007–08 | 0 | 0 | 0 | 0 | |
| Dean Morton | D | Detroit Red Wings | 1989–90 | 1 | 0 | 1 | 2 | |
| Johan Motin | D | Edmonton Oilers | 2009–10 | 0 | 0 | 0 | 0 | |
| Brian Murphy | C | Detroit Red Wings | 1974–75 | 0 | 0 | 0 | 0 | |
| Curtis Murphy | D | Minnesota Wild | 2002–03 | 0 | 0 | 0 | 0 | |
| Mike Murray | C | Philadelphia Flyers | 1987–88 | 0 | 0 | 0 | 0 | |
| Joonas Nattinen | C | Montreal Canadiens | 2013–14 | 0 | 0 | 0 | 0 | |
| Eddie Nicholson | D | Detroit Red Wings | 1947–48 | 0 | 0 | 0 | 0 | |
| Igor Nikulin | RW | Mighty Ducks of Anaheim | 1996–97‡ | 0 | 0 | 0 | 0 | |
| Will O'Neill | D | Philadelphia Flyers | 2017–18 | 0 | 0 | 0 | 0 | |
| Darryl Olsen | D | Calgary Flames | 1991–92 | 0 | 0 | 0 | 0 | |
| Ville Ottavainen | D | Seattle Kraken | 2024–25† | 0 | 1 | 1 | 0 | |
| Evariste Payer | C | Montreal Canadiens | 1917–18 | 0 | 0 | 0 | 0 | |
| Bert Peer | RW | Detroit Red Wings | 1939–40 | 0 | 0 | 0 | 0 | |
| Roger Pelletier | D | Philadelphia Flyers | 1967–68 | 0 | 0 | 0 | 0 | |
| Jacob Perreault | RW | Anaheim Ducks | 2021–22 | 0 | 0 | 0 | 0 | |
| Andre Petersson | RW | Ottawa Senators | 2011–12 | 0 | 0 | 0 | 0 | |
| Nick Petrecki | D | San Jose Sharks | 2012–13 | 0 | 0 | 0 | 0 | |
| Libor Pivko | LW | Nashville Predators | 2003–04 | 0 | 0 | 0 | 0 | |
| Vaclav Pletka | LW | Philadelphia Flyers | 2001–02 | 0 | 0 | 0 | 0 | |
| Charles Pletsch | D | Hamilton Tigers | 1920–21 | 0 | 0 | 0 | 0 | |
| Tony Poeta | RW | Chicago Black Hawks | 1951–52 | 0 | 0 | 0 | 0 | |
| Jonathan Racine | D | Florida Panthers | 2013–14 | 0 | 0 | 0 | 2 | |
| Nate Raduns | RW | Philadelphia Flyers | 2008–09 | 0 | 0 | 0 | 0 | |
| Brad Ralph | LW | Phoenix Coyotes | 2000–01 | 0 | 0 | 0 | 0 | |
| Tim Ramholt | D | Calgary Flames | 2007–08 | 0 | 0 | 0 | 0 | |
| Brendan Ranford | LW | Dallas Stars | 2014–15 | 0 | 0 | 0 | 0 | |
| Jake Rathwell | RW | Boston Bruins | 1974–75 | 0 | 0 | 0 | 0 | |
| Dan Ratushny | D | Vancouver Canucks | 1992–93 | 0 | 1 | 1 | 2 | |
| Aku Raty | RW | Arizona Coyotes | 2023–24 | 0 | 1 | 1 | 0 | |
| Mel Read | C | New York Rangers | 1946–47 | 0 | 0 | 0 | 0 | |
| Gord Reid | D | New York Americans | 1936–37 | 0 | 0 | 0 | 2 | |
| Alex Ritson | C | New York Rangers | 1944–45 | 0 | 0 | 0 | 0 | |
| Moe Robinson | D | Montreal Canadiens | 1979–80 | 0 | 0 | 0 | 0 | |
| Scott Robinson | RW | Minnesota North Stars | 1989–90 | 0 | 0 | 0 | 2 | |
| Dave Rochefort | C | Detroit Red Wings | 1966–67 | 0 | 0 | 0 | 0 | |
| Prestin Ryan | D | Vancouver Canucks | 2005–06 | 0 | 0 | 0 | 2 | |
| Drake Rymsha | C | Los Angeles Kings | 2020–21 | 0 | 0 | 0 | 0 | |
| Bob Sabourin | LW | Toronto Maple Leafs | 1951–52 | 0 | 0 | 0 | 2 | |
| Dave Salvian | RW | New York Islanders | 1976–77‡ | 0 | 1 | 1 | 2 | |
| Linus Sandin | RW | Philadelphia Flyers | 2021–22 | 0 | 0 | 0 | 0 | |
| Maxime Sauve | C | Boston Bruins | 2011–12 | 0 | 0 | 0 | 0 | |
| Brandon Scanlin | D | New York Rangers | 2023–24 | 0 | 0 | 0 | 0 | |
| Darin Sceviour | RW | Chicago Blackhawks | 1986–87 | 0 | 0 | 0 | 0 | |
| Luke Sellars | D | Atlanta Thrashers | 2001–02 | 0 | 0 | 0 | 2 | |
| Sean Selmser | LW | Columbus Blue Jackets | 2000–01 | 0 | 0 | 0 | 5 | |
| Brandy Semchuk | RW | Los Angeles Kings | 1992–93 | 0 | 0 | 0 | 2 | |
| Jonathan Sigalet | D | Boston Bruins | 2006–07 | 0 | 0 | 0 | 4 | |
| Owen Sillinger | C | Columbus Blue Jackets | 2024–25† | 0 | 0 | 0 | 2 | |
| Shane Sims | D | New York Islanders | 2010–11 | 0 | 0 | 0 | 0 | |
| Bjorn Skaare | C | Detroit Red Wings | 1978–79 | 0 | 0 | 0 | 0 | |
| Raymie Skilton | D | Montreal Wanderers | 1917–18 | 0 | 0 | 0 | 0 | |
| Wade Skolney | D | Philadelphia Flyers | 2005–06 | 0 | 0 | 0 | 2 | |
| David Sloane | D | Philadelphia Flyers | 2008–09 | 0 | 0 | 0 | 0 | |
| Colin Smith | C | Colorado Avalanche | 2014–15 | 0 | 0 | 0 | 0 | |
| Dalton Smith | LW | Buffalo Sabres | 2019–20 | 0 | 0 | 0 | 2 | |
| Vern Smith | D | New York Islanders | 1984–85 | 0 | 0 | 0 | 0 | |
| Carl Sneep | D | Pittsburgh Penguins | 2011–12 | 0 | 1 | 1 | 0 | |
| Gene Sobchuk | LW | Vancouver Canucks | 1973–74 | 0 | 0 | 0 | 0 | |
| Martin St. Amour | LW | Ottawa Senators | 1992–93 | 0 | 0 | 0 | 2 | |
| Alan Staley | C | New York Rangers | 1948–49 | 0 | 1 | 1 | 0 | |
| Jack Stanfield | LW | Chicago Black Hawks | 1965–66‡ | 0 | 0 | 0 | 0 | |
| Barney Stanley | RW | Chicago Black Hawks | 1927–28 | 0 | 0 | 0 | 0 | |
| Brian Stapleton | RW | Washington Capitals | 1975–76 | 0 | 0 | 0 | 0 | |
| Frank Steele | RW | Detroit Falcons | 1930–31 | 0 | 0 | 0 | 0 | |
| Bud Stefanski | C | New York Rangers | 1977–78 | 0 | 0 | 0 | 0 | |
| Barry Sullivan | RW | Detroit Red Wings | 1947–48 | 0 | 0 | 0 | 0 | |
| Ronnie Sundin | D | New York Rangers | 1997–98 | 0 | 0 | 0 | 0 | |
| Nick Swaney | RW | Minnesota Wild | 2022–23 | 0 | 0 | 0 | 0 | |
| Maksymilian Szuber | D | Arizona Coyotes | 2023–24 | 0 | 0 | 0 | 2 | |
| Spence Tatchell | D | New York Rangers | 1942–43 | 0 | 0 | 0 | 0 | |
| Alan Teal | C | Boston Bruins | 1954–55 | 0 | 0 | 0 | 0 | |
| Vic Teal | RW | New York Islanders | 1973–74 | 0 | 0 | 0 | 0 | |
| Joey Tenute | C | Washington Capitals | 2005–06 | 0 | 0 | 0 | 0 | |
| Stephen Tepper | RW | Chicago Blackhawks | 1992–93 | 0 | 0 | 0 | 0 | |
| Josh Teves | D | Vancouver Canucks | 2018–19 | 0 | 0 | 0 | 2 | |
| Ryan Thang | LW | Nashville Predators | 2011–12 | 0 | 0 | 0 | 0 | |
| Kenneth Thompson | LW | Montreal Wanderers | 1917–18 | 0 | 0 | 0 | 0 | |
| Glenn Tomalty | C | Winnipeg Jets | 1979–80 | 0 | 0 | 0 | 0 | |
| Kirk Tomlinson | C | Minnesota North Stars | 1987–88 | 0 | 0 | 0 | 0 | |
| Sean Toomey | C | Minnesota North Stars | 1986–87 | 0 | 0 | 0 | 0 | |
| Brayden Tracey | LW | Anaheim Ducks | 2021–22 | 0 | 0 | 0 | 0 | |
| Brock Tredway | RW | Los Angeles Kings | 1981–82‡ | 0 | 0 | 0 | 0 | |
| Randy Turnbull | D | Calgary Flames | 1981–82 | 0 | 0 | 0 | 2 | |
| Layne Ulmer | C | New York Rangers | 2003–04 | 0 | 0 | 0 | 0 | |
| Nicholas Vachon | C | New York Islanders | 1996–97 | 0 | 0 | 0 | 0 | |
| Curtis Valk | C | Florida Panthers | 2017–18 | 0 | 0 | 0 | 0 | |
| Lindsay Vallis | RW | Montreal Canadiens | 1993–94 | 0 | 0 | 0 | 0 | |
| David Van Drunen | D | Ottawa Senators | 1999–2000 | 0 | 0 | 0 | 0 | |
| Mark Van Guilder | C | Nashville Predators | 2013–14 | 0 | 0 | 0 | 0 | |
| Petri Varis | LW | Chicago Blackhawks | 1997–98 | 0 | 0 | 0 | 0 | |
| Alexei Vasiliev | D | New York Rangers | 1999–2000 | 0 | 0 | 0 | 2 | |
| Julien Vauclair | D | Ottawa Senators | 2003–04 | 0 | 0 | 0 | 2 | |
| Sid Veysey | C | Vancouver Canucks | 1977–78 | 0 | 0 | 0 | 2 | |
| Daniel Walcott | LW | Tampa Bay Lightning | 2020–21 | 0 | 0 | 0 | 5 | |
| Don Waddell | D | Los Angeles Kings | 1980–81 | 0 | 0 | 0 | 0 | |
| Reilly Walsh | D | New Jersey Devils | 2021–22 | 0 | 1 | 1 | 0 | |
| Matt Watkins | RW | Phoenix Coyotes | 2011–12 | 0 | 0 | 0 | 0 | |
| Alexander Wellington | RW | Quebec Bulldogs | 1919–20 | 0 | 0 | 0 | 0 | |
| Brian Wesenberg | RW | Philadelphia Flyers | 1998–99 | 0 | 0 | 0 | 5 | |
| Len Wharton | D | New York Rangers | 1944–45 | 0 | 0 | 0 | 0 | |
| Bob Whitlock | C | Minnesota North Stars | 1969–70 | 0 | 0 | 0 | 0 | |
| Rod Willard | LW | Toronto Maple Leafs | 1982–83 | 0 | 0 | 0 | 0 | |
| Jack Williams | RW | Columbus Blue Jackets | 2024–25† | 0 | 0 | 0 | 0 | |
| Bob Wilson | D | Chicago Black Hawks | 1953–54 | 0 | 0 | 0 | 0 | |
| Murray Wing | D | Detroit Red Wings | 1973–74 | 0 | 1 | 1 | 0 | |
| Bob Wood | D | New York Rangers | 1950–51 | 0 | 0 | 0 | 0 | |
| Keith Wright | LW | Philadelphia Flyers | 1967–68 | 0 | 0 | 0 | 0 | |
| Bill Wylie | C | New York Rangers | 1950–51 | 0 | 0 | 0 | 0 | |
| Jeremy Yablonski | RW | St. Louis Blues | 2003–04 | 0 | 0 | 0 | 5 | |
| Bogdan Yakimov | C | Edmonton Oilers | 2014–15 | 0 | 0 | 0 | 0 | |
| B. J. Young | RW | Detroit Red Wings | 1999–2000 | 0 | 0 | 0 | 0 | |
| Martin Zoborosky | D | Chicago Black Hawks | 1944–45 | 0 | 0 | 0 | 2 | |

== See also ==
- List of NHL players
- List of NHL seasons
- Cup of coffee
