= Frank Mailley =

Canadian ice hockey player

- Born: August 1, 1916; Lachine, Quebec, Canada
- Died: April 18, 1975 (aged 58)
- Height: 5 ft 9 in (175 cm)
- Weight: 182 lb (83 kg; 13 st 0 lb)
- Position: Defence
- Shot: Left
- Played for: Montreal Canadiens
- Playing career: 1938–1946

Frank Edward Mailley (August 1, 1916 — April 18, 1975) was a Canadian ice hockey defenceman. He played one game in the National Hockey League with the Montreal Canadiens during the 1942–43 season. The rest of his career, which lasted from 1938 to 1946, was spent in the minor leagues.

== Career statistics ==
=== Regular season and playoffs ===
			Regular season					Playoffs
Season	Team	League	GP	G	A	Pts	PIM	GP	G	A	Pts	PIM
1938–39	Miami Clippers	TRHL	14	8	8	16	14	—	—	—	—	—
1938–39	Lachine Rapides	QPHL	1	0	0	0	0	—	—	—	—	—
1939–40	Saint-Hyacinthe Gaulois	QPHL	22	9	13	22	12	2	0	0	0	6
1940–41	Washington Lions	EAHL	65	18	27	45	30	2	1	2	3	0
1941–42	Washington Lions	AHL	56	6	20	26	15	2	0	0	0	0
1942–43	Montreal Canadiens	NHL	1	0	0	0	0	—	—	—	—	—
1942–43	Washington Lions	AHL	51	4	14	18	30	—	—	—	—	—
1945–46	Quebec Aces	QSHL	6	0	0	0	4	6	0	0	0	0
AHL totals			107	10	34	44	45	2	0	0	0	0
NHL totals			1	0	0	0	0	—	—	—	—	—

== See also ==
- List of players who played only one game in the NHL
