= Jack Borotsik =

Canadian ice hockey player (1949–2018)

- Born: November 26, 1949; Brandon, Manitoba, Canada
- Died: June 8, 2018 (aged 68); Brandon, Manitoba, Canada
- Height: 5 ft 9 in (175 cm)
- Weight: 170 lb (77 kg; 12 st 2 lb)
- Position: Centre
- Shot: Left
- Played for: St. Louis Blues
- Playing career: 1970–1978

John Nicolas Borotsik (November 26, 1949 – June 8, 2018) was a Canadian ice hockey centre. He played one game in the National Hockey League with the St. Louis Blues during the 1974–75 season, on October 27, 1974 against the Chicago Black Hawks. The rest of his career, which lasted from 1970 to 1978, was spent in the minor leagues.

== Career statistics ==
=== Regular season and playoffs ===
			Regular season					Playoffs
Season	Team	League	GP	G	A	Pts	PIM	GP	G	A	Pts	PIM
1966–67	Brandon Wheat Kings	MJHL	—	—	—	—	—	—	—	—	—	—
1967–68	Brandon Wheat Kings	WCHL	60	36	49	85	37	—	—	—	—	—
1968–69	Brandon Wheat Kings	WCHL	59	24	49	73	2	—	—	—	—	—
1969–70	Brandon University	WCIAA	20	14	10	24	—	—	—	—	—	—
1970–71	Dayton Gems	IHL	71	15	38	53	4	10	3	4	7	5
1971–72	Dayton Gems	IHL	66	29	42	71	6	5	0	5	5	2
1972–73	Denver Spurs	WHL	71	24	38	62	15	5	1	1	2	0
1973–74	Denver Spurs	WHL	58	7	17	223	2	—	—	—	—	—
1974–75	St. Louis Blues	NHL	1	0	0	0	0	—	—	—	—	—
1974–75	Denver Spurs	CHL	76	13	42	55	10	2	0	0		0
1975–76	Brandon Elks	WCSHL	—	—	—	—	—	—	—	—	—	—
1976–77	Brandon Elks	WCSHL	—	—	—	—	—	—	—	—	—	—
1977–78	Brandon Olympics	CSHL	30	11	36	47	6	—	—	—	—	—
IHL totals			137	44	80	124	10	15	3	9	12	7
WHL totals			129	31	55	86	17	5	1	1	2	0
NHL totals			1	0	0	0	0	—	—	—	—	—

== See also ==
- List of players who played only one game in the NHL
