= Roland Lafleur =

Canadian ice hockey player

- Born: March 21, 1899; Ottawa, Ontario, Canada
- Died: November 26, 1968 (aged 69)
- Height: 5 ft 6 in (168 cm)
- Weight: 145 lb (66 kg; 10 st 5 lb)
- Position: Left wing
- Shot: Left
- Played for: Montreal Canadiens
- Playing career: 1917–1931

Joseph Pierre Raoul "Roland" Lafleur (March 21, 1899 –– November 26, 1968) was a Canadian ice hockey forward. He played one game in the National Hockey League for the Montreal Canadiens during the 1924–25 season. The rest of his career, which lasted from 1917 to 1931, was mainly spent in the Ottawa City Hockey League.

== Playing career ==
Lafleur appeared in one game in the National Hockey League during the 1924–25 season with the Montreal Canadiens, on November 29, 1924, against the Toronto St. Pats. The majority of his career was spent playing in the Ottawa City Hockey League in Ottawa.

== Career statistics ==
=== Regular season and playoffs ===
			Regular season					Playoffs
Season	Team	League	GP	G	A	Pts	PIM	GP	G	A	Pts	PIM
1917–18	Ottawa St. Brigid	OCHL	5	3	0	3	0	—	—	—	—	—
1917–18	Ottawa Royal Canadians	HOHL	1	0	0	0	0	1	1	0	1	3
1918–19	Ottawa Royal Canadians	OCHL	7	0	0	0	3	1	0	0	0	3
1919–20	Ottawa Mallettes	OCHL	7	3	0	3	—	—	—	—	—	—
1920–21	Ottawa Lasalle	OCHL	11	4	0	4	—	—	—	—	—	—
1921–22	Ottawa Montagnards	OCHL	14	14	4	18	15	8	8	6	14	10
1922–23	Ottawa Montagnards	OCHL	9	8	9	17	14	2	0	0	0	7
1923–24	Ottawa Royal Canadians	OCHL	12	3	0	3	—	—	—	—	—	—
1924–25	Montreal Canadiens	NHL	1	0	0	0	0	—	—	—	—	—
1924–25	Ottawa New Edinburghs	OCHL	16	8	1	9	—	—	—	—	—	—
1925–26	Berlin Wanderers	OCHL	—	—	—	—	—	—	—	—	—	—
1926–27	Ottawa Gunners	OCHL	14	2	3	5	—	—	—	—	—	—
1927–28	Ottawa Rideaus	OCHL	14	5	2	7	—	—	—	—	—	—
1928–29	Ottawa Lasalle	OCHL	13	5	0	5	—	3	0	0	0	—
1929–30	Ottawa Lasalle	OCHL	20	3	1	4	32	—	—	—	—	—
1930–31	Ottawa Lasalle	OCHL	20	2	3	5	33	2	0	0	0	6
NHL totals			1	0	0	0	0	—	—	—	—	—

== See also ==
- List of players who played only one game in the NHL
