= Brian Stapleton =

Canadian ice hockey player

- Born: December 25, 1951 (age 73); Fort Erie, Ontario, Canada
- Height: 6 ft 2 in (188 cm)
- Weight: 190 lb (86 kg; 13 st 8 lb)
- Position: Right wing
- Shot: Right
- Played for: Washington Capitals
- NHL draft: Undrafted
- Playing career: 1974–1977

Brian Gregory Stapleton (born December 25, 1951) is a Canadian former professional ice hockey right winger. He played one game in the National Hockey League with the Washington Capitals during the 1975–76 season, on March 23, 1976 against the Kansas City Scouts. The rest of his career, which lasted from 1974 to 1977, was spent in the minor International Hockey League.

== Career statistics ==
=== Regular season and playoffs ===
			Regular season					Playoffs
Season	Team	League	GP	G	A	Pts	PIM	GP	G	A	Pts	PIM
1971–72	Brown University	ECAC	25	4	9	13	23	—	—	—	—	—
1972–73	Brown University	ECAC	25	12	12	24	54	—	—	—	—	—
1973–74	Brown University	ECAC	23	8	18	26	40	—	—	—	—	—
1974–75	Fort Wayne Komets/Dayton Gems	IHL	69	14	19	33	66	14	2	2	4	4
1975–76	Washington Capitals	NHL	1	0	0	0	0	—	—	—	—	—
1975–76	Dayton Gems	IHL	74	26	34	60	69	15	7	8	15	4
1976–77	Dayton Gems	IHL	68	20	46	66	21	4	2	0	2	0
IHL totals			211	60	99	159	156	33	11	10	21	8
NHL totals			1	0	0	0	0	—	—	—	—	—

== Transactions ==
- Signed as a free agent by the Washington Capitals, October, 1975.

== See also ==
- List of players who played only one game in the NHL
