= Lionel Bouvrette =

Canadian ice hockey player

- Born: June 10, 1914; Hawkesbury, Ontario, Canada
- Died: February 8, 2000 (aged 85); Delray Beach, Florida, U.S.
- Height: 5 ft 9 in (175 cm)
- Weight: 165 lb (75 kg; 11 st 11 lb)
- Position: Goaltender
- Caught: Left
- Played for: New York Rangers
- Playing career: 1941–1947

Joseph Wilfrid Lionel Gerard Bouvrette (June 10, 1914 — February 8, 2000) was a Canadian ice hockey goaltender.

Bouvrette played one game in the National Hockey League for the New York Rangers during the 1942–43 season on March 18, 1943. His rights were owned by the Montreal Canadiens who agreed to loan Bouvrette to the Rangers to replace the injured Jimmy Franks. He had a more successful career with the Quebec Aces of the Quebec Senior Hockey League, leading the league twice in shutouts. He was also the recipient of the Vimy Memorial Trophy, awarded to the league's Most Valuable Player.

== Career statistics ==
=== Regular season and playoffs ===
			Regular season								Playoffs
Season	Team	League	GP	W	L	T	Min	GA	SO	GAA	GP	W	L	Min	GA	SO	GAA
1931–32	Montreal St. Francis Xavier	MCHL	10	—	—	—	600	16	3	1.60	2	2	0	120	3	0	1.50
1932–33	Montreal St. Francis Xavier	MCHL	11	—	—	—	660	29	1	2.64	2	2	0	120	3	0	1.50
1933–34	Montreal St. Francis Xavier	MCHL	8	—	—	—	480	23	1	2.87	—	—	—	—	—	—	—
1935–36	Montreal LaFontaine Blues	MCHL	4	—	—	—	240	26	0	6.50	—	—	—	—	—	—	—
1938–39	Montreal Concordia Civics	QSHL	5	—	—	—	300	12	1	2.40	3	—	—	180	9	0	3.00
1939–40	Montreal Concordia Civics	QSHL	30	—	—	—	1800	106	1	3.53	5	—	—	300	17	1	3.40
1940–41	Montreal Concordia Civics	QSHL	35	—	—	—	2100	174	0	4.97	—	—	—	—	—	—	—
1941–42	Quebec Aces	QSHL	33	—	—	—	1980	92	5	2.79	6	—	—	360	16	0	2.67
1941–42	Quebec Aces	Al-Cup	—	—	—	—	—	—	—	—	8	4	4	480	27	1	3.38
1942–43	New York Rangers	NHL	1	0	1	0	60	6	0	6.00	—	—	—	—	—	—	—
1942–43	Quebec Aces	QSHL	33	—	—	—	1980	123	1	3.73	4	—	—	240	12	0	3.00
1943–44	Quebec Aces	QSHL	24	15	7	2	1440	65	3	2.71	6	—	—	360	21	0	3.50
1943–44	Quebec Aces	Al-Cup	—	—	—	—	—	—	—	—	9	9	0	540	27	0	3.00
1944–45	Quebec Aces	QSHL	24	—	—	—	1440	89	2	3.71	7	—	—	420	17	0	2.43
1945–46	Quebec Aces	QSHL	31	—	—	—	1860	115	1	3.71	—	—	—	—	—	—	—
1946–47	Quebec Aces	QSHL	8	—	—	—	480	39	0	4.88	4	1	3	240	19	0	4.75
NHL totals			1	0	1	0	60	6	0	6.00	—	—	—	—	—	—	—

== See also ==
- List of players who played only one game in the NHL
