= Rolly Huard =

Canadian ice hockey player

- Born: September 6, 1902 Beauharnois, Quebec, Canada
- Died: September 16, 1979 (aged 77) near Maniwaki, Quebec, Canada
- Height: 5 ft 10 in (178 cm)
- Weight: 170 lb (77 kg; 12 st 2 lb)
- Position: Centre
- Shot: Left
- Played for: Toronto Maple Leafs
- Playing career: 1925–1934

Joseph Albert Marcel Rolland Huard (September 6, 1902 – September 16, 1979) was a Canadian professional ice hockey centre who played in one National Hockey League game for the Toronto Maple Leafs during the 1930–31 season, on December 13, 1930, and became the first player to score a goal in his only NHL game. Huard would ultimately play eight seasons of pro hockey from 1926-34, primarily in the Canadian Professional Hockey League (later the International Hockey League.) He died in 1979 on a fishing trip near Maniwaki, Quebec, and was interred at Notre Dame Cemetery in Ottawa.

== Career statistics ==
=== Regular season and playoffs ===
			Regular season					Playoffs
Season	Team	League	GP	G	A	Pts	PIM	GP	G	A	Pts	PIM
1921–22	University of Ottawa	OCHL	12	10	7	17	12	—	—	—	—	—
1922–23	Ottawa Montagnards	OCHL	9	8	4	12	2	2	0	0	0	0
1923–24	Ottawa Montagnards	OCHL	12	4	2	6	—	6	5	1	6	6
1924–25	Ottawa Montagnards	OCHL	16	13	3	16	—	7	1	0	1	8
1925–26	Fort William Forts	TBSHL	20	13	4	17	18	3	0	0	0	2
1926–27	Windsor Hornets	Can-Pro	32	16	4	20	16	—	—	—	—	—
1927–28	Windsor Hornets	Can-Pro	42	21	7	28	8	—	—	—	—	—
1928–29	Windsor Hornets	Can-Pro	2	0	0	0	0	—	—	—	—	—
1928–29	Buffalo Bisons	Can-Pro	40	18	8	26	12	—	—	—	—	—
1929–30	Buffalo Bisons	IHL	40	8	6	14	16	7	1	1	2	10
1930–31	Toronto Maple Leafs	NHL	1	1	0	1	0	—	—	—	—	—
1930–31	Buffalo Bisons	IHL	20	5	4	9	6	—	—	—	—	—
1930–31	Syracuse Stars	IHL	10	1	2	3	0	—	—	—	—	—
1930–31	London Tecumsehs	IHL	17	2	1	3	6	—	—	—	—	—
1931–32	London Tecumsehs	IHL	45	3	11	14	12	6	1	2	3	0
1932–33	St. Louis Flyers	AHA	45	15	17	32	2	4	0	0	0	2
1933–34	St. Louis Flyers	AHA	42	5	5	10	14	7	0	1	1	2
1935–36	Ottawa Lasalle	OCHL	—	—	—	—	—	—	—	—	—	—
Can-Pro totals			116	55	19	74	36	—	—	—	—	—
IHL totals			132	19	24	43	40	13	2	3	5	10
NHL totals			1	1	0	1	0	—	—	—	—	—

== See also ==
- List of players who played only one game in the NHL
