= Farrand Gillie =

Canadian ice hockey player

- Born: May 11, 1905 Cornwall, Ontario, Canada
- Died: October 7, 1972 (aged 67) Cornwall, Ontario, Canada
- Height: 5 ft 10 in (178 cm)
- Weight: 150 lb (68 kg; 10 st 10 lb)
- Position: Left wing
- Shot: Left
- Played for: Detroit Cougars
- Playing career: 1927–1942

Farrand Douglas Gillie (May 11, 1905 – October 7, 1972) was a Canadian professional ice hockey left winger who played in one National Hockey League game for the Detroit Cougars during the 1928–29 NHL season. After his lone game in the NHL, Gillie spent several years in the minor International Hockey League before moving to the United Kingdom for one season, finishing his career in the Quebec Senior Hockey League, retiring in 1942.

== Career statistics ==
=== Regular season and playoffs ===
			Regular season					Playoffs
Season	Team	League	GP	G	A	Pts	PIM	GP	G	A	Pts	PIM
1926–27	Cornwall Colts	LOVHL	—	—	—	—	—	—	—	—	—	—
1927–28	Detroit Olympics	Can-Pro	10	0	0	0	0	—	—	—	—	—
1928–29	Detroit Cougars	NHL	1	0	0	0	0	—	—	—	—	—
1928–29	Detroit Olympics	Can-Pro	41	5	4	9	31	7	0	0	0	8
1929–30	Detroit Olympics	IHL	42	9	7	16	38	3	0	0	0	0
1930–31	Detroit Olympics	IHL	46	19	6	25	36	—	—	—	—	—
1931–32	Detroit Olympics	IHL	48	16	10	26	31	6	0	0	0	8
1932–33	London Tecumsehs	IHL	44	13	9	22	36	6	3	1	4	6
1933–34	London Tecumsehs	IHL	44	11	5	16	26	6	2	2	4	2
1934–35	Windsor Buldogs	IHL	43	4	7	11	22	—	—	—	—	—
1935–36	Windsor Bulldogs	IHL	11	0	0	0	4	—	—	—	—	—
1935–36	Rochester Cardinals	IHL	38	5	9	14	10	—	—	—	—	—
1937–38	Cornwall Flyers	QSHL	24	8	9	17	18	6	3	1	4	8
1937–38	Cornwall Flyers	Al-Cup	—	—	—	—	—	11	4	5	9	22
1938–39	Brighton Tigers	Ln-Cup	—	2	0	2	—	—	—	—	—	—
1938–39	Brighton Tigers	ENL	—	11	6	17	—	—	—	—	—	—
1938–39	Brighton Tigers	Exhib	—	3	4	7	—	—	—	—	—	—
1939–40	Cornwall Flyers	LOVHL	28	4	2	6	20	5	2	3	5	7
1940–41	Cornwall Flyers	QSHL	34	7	21	28	8	4	0	2	2	2
1941–42	Cornwall Flyers	QSHL	1	0	0	0	0	—	—	—	—	—
IHL totals			316	77	53	130	203	21	5	3	8	16
NHL totals			1	0	0	0	0	—	—	—	—	—

== See also ==
- List of players who played only one game in the NHL
