= Erich Goldmann =

German ice hockey player

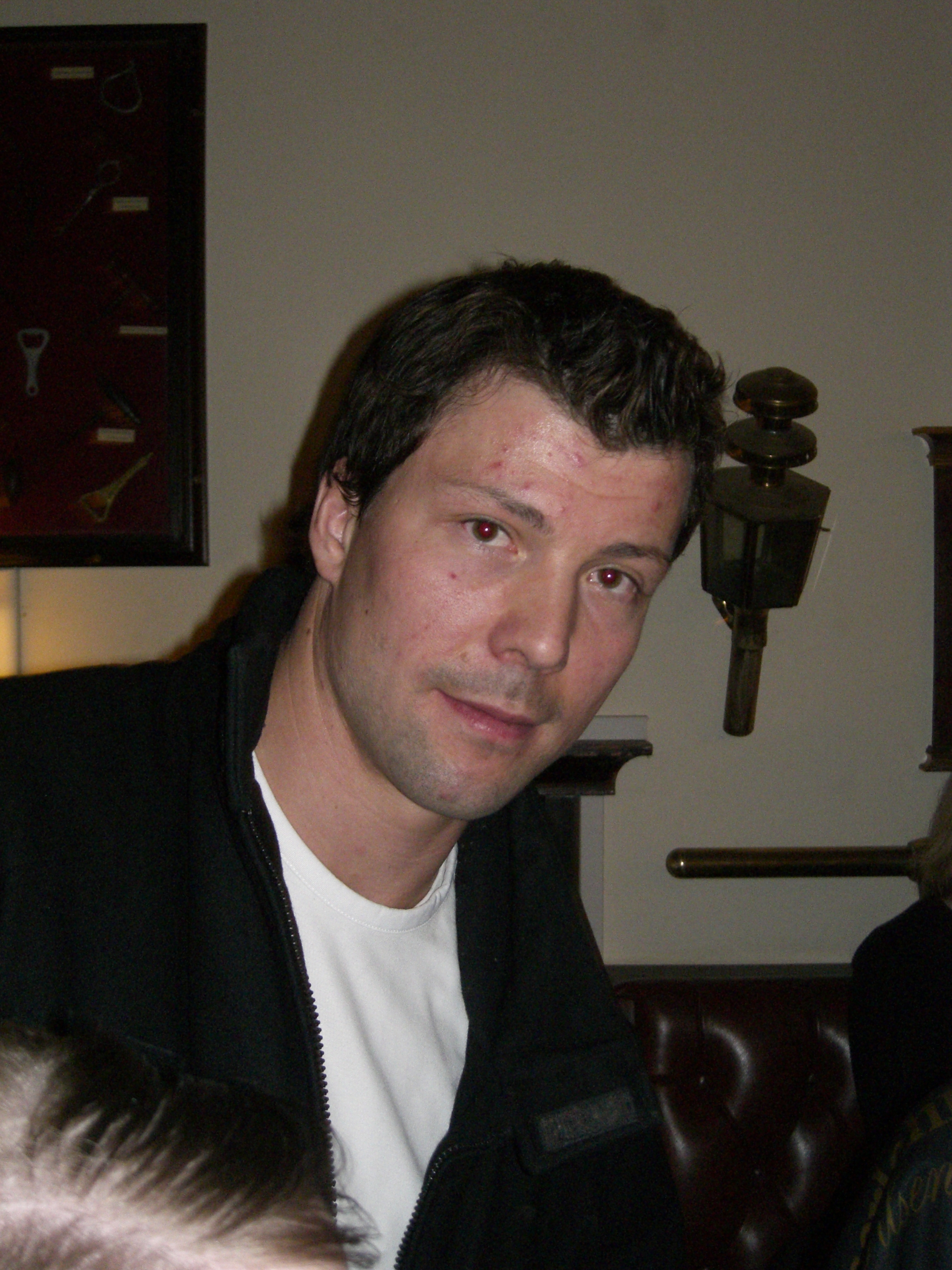
- Goldmann in 2006
- Born: 7 April 1976 (age 50) Dingolfing, West Germany
- Height: 6 ft 3 in (191 cm)
- Weight: 207 lb (94 kg; 14 st 11 lb)
- Position: Defence
- Shot: Left
- Played for: Adler Mannheim; Kaufbeurer Adler; Ottawa Senators; Essen Mosquitoes; ERC Ingolstadt; Iserlohn Roosters; EHC München
- National team: Germany
- NHL draft: 212th overall, 1996; Ottawa Senators
- Playing career: 1993–2007

Erich Goldmann (born 7 April 1976) is a German former professional ice hockey defenceman. Goldmann was drafted by the Ottawa Senators in the 8th round (212th overall) in the 1996 NHL entry draft. He played one game in the National Hockey League for the team against the Nashville Predators. He did not register a point in his 9:44 of ice time. Most of his professional career was spent in the Deutsche Eishockey Liga, most recently for the Iserlohn Roosters. He ended his playing career in the 2nd Bundesliga with a single season at EHC München.

Goldmann played 126 international games for the German national team, including the 1998 and 2002 Winter Olympics. On 28 May 2011, he was inducted into the German Ice Hockey Hall of Fame. Goldmann currently works as the main ice hockey pundit for the German TV channel Sport1.

== Career statistics ==
=== Regular season and playoffs ===
			Regular season					Playoffs
Season	Team	League	GP	G	A	Pts	PIM	GP	G	A	Pts	PIM
1993–94	EV Landshut	GER	33	0	0	0	4	7	0	0	0	0
1994–95	Adler Mannheim	DEL	31	0	0	0	20	10	1	0	1	2
1995–96	Adler Mannheim	DEL	47	0	3	3	40	8	0	0	0	4
1996–97	Kaufbeurer Adler	DEL	44	2	4	6	58	—	—	—	—	—
1997–98	Worcester IceCats	AHL	31	0	2	2	40	—	—	—	—	—
1997–98	Detroit Vipers	IHL	3	0	0	0	2	—	—	—	—	—
1997–98	Dayton Bombers	ECHL	3	0	2	2	5	5	0	0	0	8
1998–99	Hershey Bears	AHL	21	1	1	2	23	—	—	—	—	—
1998–99	Cincinnati Cyclones	IHL	5	0	1	1	7	—	—	—	—	—
1998–99	Cincinnati Mighty Ducks	AHL	32	0	2	2	18	3	0	0	0	2
1999–00	Ottawa Senators	NHL	1	0	0	0	0	—	—	—	—	—
1999–00	Grand Rapids Griffins	IHL	26	1	1	2	15	—	—	—	—	—
1999–00	Detroit Vipers	IHL	11	1	0	1	13	—	—	—	—	—
2000–01	Moskitos Essen	DEL	58	7	3	10	44	—	—	—	—	—
2001–02	Moskitos Essen	DEL	59	1	17	18	32	—	—	—	—	—
2002–03	ERC Ingolstadt	DEL	51	1	8	9	42	—	—	—	—	—
2003–04	Iserlohn Roosters	DEL	52	4	11	15	60	—	—	—	—	—
2004–05	Iserlohn Roosters	DEL	35	3	7	10	26	—	—	—	—	—
2005–06	Iserlohn Roosters	DEL	47	5	9	14	76	—	—	—	—	—
2006–07	Iserlohn Roosters	DEL	52	1	6	7	76	—	—	—	—	—
2007–08	EHC München	GER-2	52	5	14	19	60	—	—	—	—	—
DEL totals			476	24	68	92	474	24	2	0	2	8
NHL totals			1	0	0	0	0	—	—	—	—	—

=== International ===
Year	Team	Event	GP	G	A	Pts	PIM
1993	Germany	EJC	6	0	0	0	2
1994	Germany	WJC	7	0	0	0	6
1994	Germany	EJC	5	3	1	4	10
1995	Germany	WJC	7	1	0	1	18
1996	Germany	WJC	6	3	4	7	8
1996	Germany	WC	6	0	1	1	2
1996	Germany	WCH	3	0	1	1	2
1997	Germany	WC	8	0	0	0	0
1998	Germany	OG	4	0	1	1	27
1998	Germany	WC	6	0	0	0	16
2000	Germany	WC B	7	1	2	3	33
2001	Germany	WC	7	0	0	0	6
2002	Germany	OG	7	0	0	0	27
2002	Germany	WC	7	1	0	1	2
2004	Germany	WC	1	0	0	0	2
Junior totals			31	7	5	12	44
Senior totals			56	2	5	7	117

== See also ==
- List of players who played only one game in the NHL
