= Walt Farrant =

Canadian ice hockey player

- Born: August 12, 1912; Toronto, Ontario, Canada
- Died: October 2, 1977 (aged 65); Burlington, Ontario, Canada
- Height: 5 ft 10 in (178 cm)
- Weight: 155 lb (70 kg; 11 st 1 lb)
- Position: Right wing
- Shot: Right
- Played for: Chicago Black Hawks
- Playing career: 1932–1946

Walter Leslie "Whitey" Farrant (August 12, 1912 – October 2, 1977) was a Canadian professional ice hockey right winger who played in one National Hockey League game for the Chicago Black Hawks during the 1943–44 season, on January 6, 1944 against the Toronto Maple Leafs. The rest of his career, which lasted from 1932 to 1946, was spent in various minor leagues.

== Career statistics ==
=== Regular season and playoffs ===
			Regular season					Playoffs
Season	Team	League	GP	G	A	Pts	PIM	GP	G	A	Pts	PIM
1929–30	Parkdale Canoe Club	OHA	2	0	0	0	0	—	—	—	—	—
1930–31	Parkdale Canoe Club	OHA	9	9	2	11	4	—	—	—	—	—
1931–32	Parkdale Canoe Club	OHA	10	13	2	15	10	—	—	—	—	—
1931–32	Toronto City Services	TMHL	4	0	1	1	5	—	—	—	—	—
1932–33	Toronto Marlboros	OHA Sr	19	8	8	16	10	2	0	0	0	0
1932–33	Toronto City Services	TMHL	18	6	3	9	6	6	3	3	6	2
1933–34	Toronto Marlboros	OHA Sr	16	4	9	13	10	1	0	0	0	0
1933–34	Toronto City Services	TMHL	14	15	9	24	8	9	3	7	10	8
1934–35	Toronto All-Stars	TIHL	2	1	0	1	2	2	0	1	1	0
1934–35	Toronto City Services	TIHL	13	14	9	23	4	7	7	4	11	4
1935–36	Rochester Cardinals	IHL	46	26	19	45	12	—	—	—	—	—
1935–36	Springfield Indians	Can-Am	1	0	0	0	0	—	—	—	—	—
1936–37	New Haven Eagles	IAHL	25	6	6	12	4	—	—	—	—	—
1936–37	Providence Reds	IAHL	14	2	3	5	2	2	0	0	0	0
1937–38	Minneapolis Millers	AHA	47	18	20	38	25	5	2	3	5	5
1938–39	Minneapolis Millers	AHA	47	35	34	69	8	4	1	2	3	0
1939–40	Minneapolis Millers	AHA	48	29	35	64	9	3	1	1	2	0
1940–41	Minneapolis Millers	AHA	11	1	5	6	0	—	—	—	—	—
1940–41	Tulsa Oilers	AHA	36	15	12	27	0	—	—	—	—	—
1941–42	Toronto Marlboros	OHA Sr	21	22	15	37	0	6	5	3	8	2
1941–42	Toronto People's Credit	TIHL	8	3	10	13	0	5	1	2	3	0
1942–43	Toronto People's Credit	TIHL	29	32	29	61	21	9	12	7	19	0
1943–44	Chicago Black Hawks	NHL	1	0	0	0	0	—	—	—	—	—
1943–44	Toronto People's Credit	TIHL	29	31	29	60	6	10	13	6	19	2
1944–45	Toronto People's Credit	TIHL	33	56	28	84	7	9	8	8	16	0
1945–46	Toronto People's Credit	TIHL	32	30	20	50	4	5	2	3	5	6
AHA totals			189	98	106	204	42	12	4	6	10	5
NHL totals			1	0	0	0	0	—	—	—	—	—

== See also ==
- List of players who played only one game in the NHL
