= Jamie Fritsch =

American ice hockey player (born 1985)

- Born: February 25, 1985 (age 41) Odenton, Maryland, U.S.
- Height: 6 ft 2 in (188 cm)
- Weight: 195 lb (88 kg; 13 st 13 lb)
- Position: Defense
- Shot: Left
- Played for: Philadelphia Flyers; Milano Rossoblu; Braehead Clan
- NHL draft: Undrafted
- Playing career: 2009–2016

Jamie Fritsch (born February 25, 1985) is an American former professional ice hockey defenceman who last played for Braehead Clan, Scotland of the Elite Ice Hockey League (EIHL). He played in one National Hockey League (NHL) game with the Philadelphia Flyers during the 2008–09 season.

== Playing career ==
Undrafted, he played collegiate hockey with the University of New Hampshire of the Hockey East. After completing his senior year in 2008–09, amassing 146 games with the Wildcats, he was signed by the Philadelphia Flyers on an amateur try-out contract on April 12, 2009. Signed because of the Flyers salary cap limitations, Fritsch made his NHL debut in the last regular season game against the New York Rangers on the same day. He became the second player to make it to the NHL who grew up in Maryland.

Jamie signed with the Gwinnett Gladiators of the ECHL for the 2009–10 season and played in 48 games posting 5 points. On February 5, 2010, he was signed to a try-out with the Norfolk Admirals of the AHL and appeared in 2 games. Following the season, he was traded to the Las Vegas Wranglers on August 12, 2010.

Fritsch signed his first European contract as a free agent with Italian club, Hockey Milano Rossoblu on August 20, 2013. After a single season in Italy, Fritsch continued abroad in signing a one-year contract with Scottish club, Braehead Clan of the EIHL on August 13, 2014.

== Career statistics ==
			Regular season					Playoffs
Season	Team	League	GP	G	A	Pts	PIM	GP	G	A	Pts	PIM
2005–06	New Hampshire Wildcats	HE	32	4	6	10	24	—	—	—	—	—
2006–07	New Hampshire Wildcats	HE	39	2	9	11	50	—	—	—	—	—
2007–08	New Hampshire Wildcats	HE	37	4	6	10	49	—	—	—	—	—
2008–09	New Hampshire Wildcats	HE	38	1	7	8	48	—	—	—	—	—
2008–09	Philadelphia Flyers	NHL	1	0	0	0	0	—	—	—	—	—
2009–10	Gwinnett Gladiators	ECHL	48	1	4	5	41	—	—	—	—	—
2009–10	Norfolk Admirals	AHL	2	0	0	0	0	—	—	—	—	—
2010–11	Las Vegas Wranglers	ECHL	54	3	7	10	56	2	0	1	1	2
2010–11	Houston Aeros	AHL	13	0	0	0	4	—	—	—	—	—
2011–12	Las Vegas Wranglers	ECHL	42	1	8	9	62	8	0	3	3	6
2011–12	Bridgeport Sound Tigers	AHL	1	0	0	0	0	—	—	—	—	—
2011–12	Houston Aeros	AHL	16	0	0	0	4	3	0	0	0	0
2012–13	Las Vegas Wranglers	ECHL	60	3	10	13	68	—	—	—	—	—
2013–14	Milano Rossoblu	ITL	42	2	23	25	50	4	0	1	1	6
2014–15	Braehead Clan	EIHL	60	3	27	30	48	2	0	1	1	4
2015–16	Braehead Clan	EIHL	60	5	13	18	52	2	0	0	0	7
NHL totals			1	0	0	0	0	—	—	—	—	—

== See also ==
- List of players who played only one game in the NHL
