= Peter Fiorentino =

Canadian ice hockey player

- Born: December 22, 1968 (age 56); Niagara Falls, Ontario, Canada
- Height: 6 ft 1 in (185 cm)
- Weight: 200 lb (91 kg; 14 st 4 lb)
- Position: Defence
- Shot: Right
- Played for: New York Rangers
- NHL draft: 215th overall, 1988; New York Rangers
- Playing career: 1989–1998

Peter Nathan Fiorentino (born December 22, 1968) is a Canadian former professional ice hockey defenceman who played in one National Hockey League game for the New York Rangers during the 1991–92 NHL season. His sole game was played against the Los Angeles Kings, in which he was credited with two shots on goal but did not record any points.

== Career statistics ==
			Regular season					Playoffs
Season	Team	League	GP	G	A	Pts	PIM	GP	G	A	Pts	PIM
1984–85	Niagara Falls Canucks	GHL	38	7	10	17	149	—	—	—	—	—
1985–86	Sault Ste. Marie Greyhounds	OHL	58	1	6	7	87	—	—	—	—	—
1986–87	Sault Ste. Marie Greyhounds	OHL	64	1	12	13	187	—	—	—	—	—
1987–88	Sault Ste. Marie Greyhounds	OHL	65	5	27	32	252	6	2	2	4	21
1988–89	Sault Ste. Marie Greyhounds	OHL	55	5	24	29	220	—	—	—	—	—
1988–89	Denver Rangers	IHL	10	0	0	0	39	4	0	0	0	24
1989–90	Flint Spirits	IHL	64	2	7	9	302	—	—	—	—	—
1990–91	Binghamton Rangers	AHL	55	2	11	13	361	1	0	0	0	0
1991–92	New York Rangers	NHL	1	0	0	0	0	—	—	—	—	—
1991–92	Binghamton Rangers	AHL	70	2	11	13	340	5	0	1	1	24
1992–93	Binghamton Rangers	AHL	64	9	5	14	286	13	0	3	3	22
1993–94	Binghamton Rangers	AHL	68	7	15	22	220	—	—	—	—	—
1994–95	Binghamton Rangers	AHL	66	9	16	25	183	2	0	1	1	11
1995–96	Las Vegas Thunder	IHL	54	5	7	12	192	—	—	—	—	—
1995–96	Indianapolis Ice	IHL	10	0	0	0	27	5	0	0	0	2
1996–97	Binghamton Rangers	AHL	63	1	10	11	191	4	0	2	2	0
1997–98	Quebec Rafales	IHL	12	0	2	2	46	—	—	—	—	—
1997–98	Hartford Wolf Pack	AHL	1	0	0	0	0	—	—	—	—	—
1997–98	B.C. Icemen	UHL	35	2	9	11	78	5	1	1	2	2
NHL totals			1	0	0	0	0	—	—	—	—	—
AHL totals			387	30	68	98	1,581	25	0	7	7	57

== See also ==
- List of players who played only one game in the NHL
