= Bob Geale =

Canadian ice hockey player

- Born: April 17, 1962 (age 63) Edmonton, Alberta, Canada
- Height: 6 ft 0 in (183 cm)
- Weight: 185 lb (84 kg; 13 st 3 lb)
- Position: Centre
- Shot: Right
- Played for: Pittsburgh Penguins
- NHL draft: 156th overall, 1980; Pittsburgh Penguins
- Playing career: 1982–1991

Robert Charles Geale (born April 17, 1962) is a Canadian former professional ice hockey centre, who played in one National Hockey League game for the Pittsburgh Penguins during the 1984–85 NHL season.

== Career statistics ==
			Regular Season					Playoffs
Season	Team	League	GP	G	A	Pts	PIM	GP	G	A	Pts	PIM
1979–80	Portland Winter Hawks	WHL	72	17	29	46	32	8	0	3	3	9
1980–81	Portland Winter Hawks	WHL	54	30	32	62	54	—	—	—	—	—
1981–82	Portland Winter Hawks	WHL	72	31	54	85	89	15	8	10	18	26
1982–83	Baltimore Skipjacks	AHL	56	4	10	14	6	—	—	—	—	—
1983–84	Baltimore Skipjacks	AHL	74	17	23	40	50	7	1	0	1	2
1984–85	Baltimore Skipjacks	AHL	77	26	23	49	42	15	3	8	11	11
1984–85	Pittsburgh Penguins	NHL	1	0	0	0	2	—	—	—	—	—
1985–86	Baltimore Skipjacks	AHL	21	5	7	12	9	—	—	—	—	—
1987–88	Heilbronner EC	2.GBun	36	31	38	69	36	—	—	—	—	—
1988–89	Heilbronn EC	2.GBun	36	32	35	67	45	—	—	—	—	—
NHL totals			1	0	0	0	2	—	—	—	—	—

== See also ==
- List of players who played only one game in the NHL
