= Marcel Fillion =

Canadian ice hockey player

- Born: May 28, 1922 Thetford Mines, Quebec, Canada
- Died: May 15, 1998 (aged 75)
- Height: 5 ft 7 in (170 cm)
- Weight: 175 lb (79 kg; 12 st 7 lb)
- Position: Left wing
- Shot: Left
- Played for: Boston Bruins
- Playing career: 1940–1954

Joseph George Leopold Marcel Fillion (May 28, 1922 – May 15, 1998) was a Canadian professional ice hockey left winger who played in one National Hockey League game for the Boston Bruins during the 1944–45 NHL season, on March 18, 1945, against the Montreal Canadiens. The rest of his career, which lasted from 1940 to 1954, was spent in different minor leagues. Marcel is the brother of Bob Fillion.

== Career statistics ==
=== Regular season and playoffs ===
			Regular season					Playoffs
Season	Team	League	GP	G	A	Pts	PIM	GP	G	A	Pts	PIM
1940–41	Shawinigan Falls Cataractes	QSHL	27	11	13	24	2	10	4	2	6	8
1941–42	Shawinigan Falls Cataractes	MDHL	33	15	17	32	16	10	2	1	3	2
1942–43	Quebec Sea Gulls	QCHL	—	—	—	—	—	10	17	23	40	—
1944–45	Boston Olympics	EAHL	46	38	40	78	84	12	10	8	18	2
1945–45	Boston Bruins	NHL	1	0	0	0	0	—	—	—	—	—
1945–46	Shawinigan Falls Cataractes	QSHL	20	8	6	14	14	4	1	0	1	4
1946–47	Providence Reds	AHL	21	2	6	8	6	—	—	—	—	—
1946–47	Boston Olympics	EAHL	27	19	6	25	18	9	7	8	15	14
1947–48	Boston Olympics	QSHL	48	25	32	57	22	—	—	—	—	—
1947–48	Boston Olympics	EAHL	19	14	17	31	15	—	—	—	—	—
1948–49	Boston Olympics	QSHL	63	39	34	73	41	12	7	2	9	4
1949–50	Sherbrooke Saints	QSHL	60	21	29	50	24	6	0	0	0	2
1949–50	Sherbrooke Saints	Al-Cup	—	—	—	—	—	9	2	1	3	11
1950–51	Sherbrooke Saints	QSHL	58	14	14	28	31	7	0	1	1	6
1952–53	Rimouski Renads	LSLHL	58	24	36	60	44	—	—	—	—	—
1953–54	Rimouski Renads	LSLHL	65	13	14	27	8	—	—	—	—	—
QSHL totals			276	118	128	246	134	39	12	5	17	24
NHL totals			1	0	0	0	0	—	—	—	—	—

== See also ==
- List of players who played only one game in the NHL
