= Rob Garner =

Canadian ice hockey player

- Born: August 17, 1958 (age 67) Weston, Ontario, Canada
- Height: 5 ft 11 in (180 cm)
- Weight: 181 lb (82 kg; 12 st 13 lb)
- Position: Centre
- Shot: Left
- Played for: Pittsburgh Penguins
- NHL draft: 75th overall, 1978; Pittsburgh Penguins
- Playing career: 1978–1983

Robert William Garner (born August 17, 1958) is a Canadian former professional ice hockey centre who played in one National Hockey League game for the Pittsburgh Penguins during the 1982–83 season, on November 17, 1982, against the Hartford Whalers. The rest of his career, which lasted from 1978 to 1983, was mainly spent in the American Hockey League. As a youth, he played in the 1970 and 1971 Quebec International Pee-Wee Hockey Tournaments with a minor ice hockey team from Barrie.

== Career statistics ==
=== Regular season and playoffs ===
			Regular season					Playoffs
Season	Team	League	GP	G	A	Pts	PIM	GP	G	A	Pts	PIM
1975–76	Markham Royals	MetJBHL	26	18	8	26	34	—	—	—	—	—
1975–76	Toronto Marlboros	OMJHL	37	6	8	14	28	10	4	3	7	20
1976–77	Toronto Marlboros	OMJHL	62	31	35	66	58	6	2	2	4	13
1977–78	Toronto Marlboros	OMJHL	48	38	35	73	111	5	2	1	3	24
1978–79	Binghamton Dusters	AHL	77	15	19	34	97	10	5	3	8	19
1979–80	Syracuse Firebirds	AHL	46	12	13	25	21	4	0	1	1	21
1979–80	Cincinnati Stingers	CHL	27	5	8	13	36	—	—	—	—	—
1980–81	Binghamton Whalers	AHL	62	18	20	38	77	6	1	6	7	13
1981–82	Erie Blades	AHL	75	25	27	52	60	—	—	—	—	—
1982–83	Pittsburgh Penguins	NHL	1	0	0	0	0	—	—	—	—	—
1982–83	Baltimore Skipjacks	AHL	70	21	32	53	48	—	—	—	—	—
NHL totals			1	0	0	0	0	—	—	—	—	—

== See also ==
- List of players who played only one game in the NHL
