= Alex Shibicky =

Canadian ice hockey player (1914–2005)

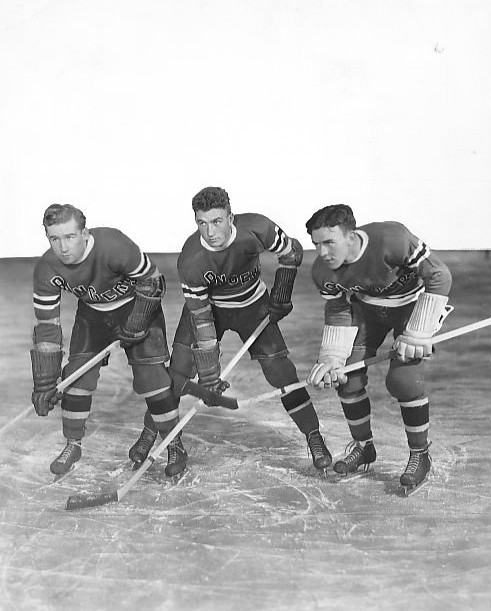
- Mac Colville, Neil Colville and Alex Shibicky, 1938
- Born: May 19, 1914 Winnipeg, Manitoba, Canada
- Died: July 9, 2005 (aged 91) South Surrey, British Columbia, Canada
- Height: 6 ft 0 in (183 cm)
- Weight: 185 lb (84 kg; 13 st 3 lb)
- Position: Left wing
- Shot: Right
- Played for: New York Rangers
- Playing career: 1935–1946

Alexandre Dimitri Shibicky (May 19, 1914 – July 9, 2005) was a Canadian ice hockey forward who played for the New York Rangers of the National Hockey League from 1935 to 1946.

Shibicky was also a Stanley Cup winner in 1940, and the vice-president of the first incarnation of the National Hockey League Players' Association, but he is best known for being the first player to use a slapshot, which he did in 1937. He said he learned it in practice from teammate Fred "Bun" Cook during the 1935–36 season. He also spent three years in the Canadian Forces during the Second World War.

== Career statistics ==
=== Regular season and playoffs ===
			Regular season					Playoffs
Season	Team	League	GP	G	A	Pts	PIM	GP	G	A	Pts	PIM
1931–32	Winnipeg Columbus	MAHA	—	—	—	—	—	—	—	—	—	—
1932–33	Winnipeg Columbus	WDJHL	11	3	0	3	18	3	1	0	1	0
1933–34	Selkirk Jr. Fishermen	MJHL	12	11	4	15	19	5	6	3	9	0
1933–34	Selkirk Fishermen	MHL	1	0	0	0	0	—	—	—	—	—
1934–35	New York Crescents	EAHL	21	16	9	25	31	8	8	1	9	4
1935–36	New York Rangers	NHL	18	4	2	6	6	—	—	—	—	—
1935–36	Philadelphia Ramblers	Can-Am	28	16	6	22	13	—	—	—	—	—
1936–37	New York Rangers	NHL	47	14	8	22	30	9	1	4	5	0
1937–38	New York Rangers	NHL	48	16	18	34	26	3	2	0	2	2
1938–39	New York Rangers	NHL	48	24	9	33	24	7	3	1	4	2
1939–40	New York Rangers	NHL	44	11	21	32	33	11	2	5	7	4
1940–41	New York Rangers	NHL	41	10	15	25	14	3	1	0	1	2
1941–42	New York Rangers	NHL	45	20	14	34	16	6	3	2	5	2
1942–43	Ottawa Commandos	QSHL	18	15	7	22	25	11	7	5	12	12
1942–43	Ottawa Commandos	Al-Cup	—	—	—	—	—	11	11	13	24	2
1943–44	Ottawa Commandos	QSHL	10	6	6	12	6	—	—	—	—	—
1944–45	Ottawa Engineers	OCHL	4	3	5	8	0	5	8	3	11	4
1945–46	New York Rangers	NHL	33	10	5	15	12	—	—	—	—	—
1945–46	Providence Reds	AHL	18	7	12	19	4	1	0	0	0	0
1946–47	New Haven Ramblers	AHL	53	20	12	32	28	3	0	2	2	0
1947–48	New Westminster Royals	PCHL	—	—	—	—	—	—	—	—	—	—
NHL totals			324	109	92	201	161	39	12	12	24	12

== Awards and achievements ==
- EAHL First All-Star Team (1935)
- Stanley Cup Championship (1940)
- Honoured Member of the Manitoba Hockey Hall of Fame
- In the 2009 book 100 Ranger Greats, was ranked No. 57 all-time of the 901 New York Rangers who had played during the team's first 82 seasons
