= Neil Colville =

Canadian ice hockey player (1914–1987)

- Hockey Hall of Fame, 1967
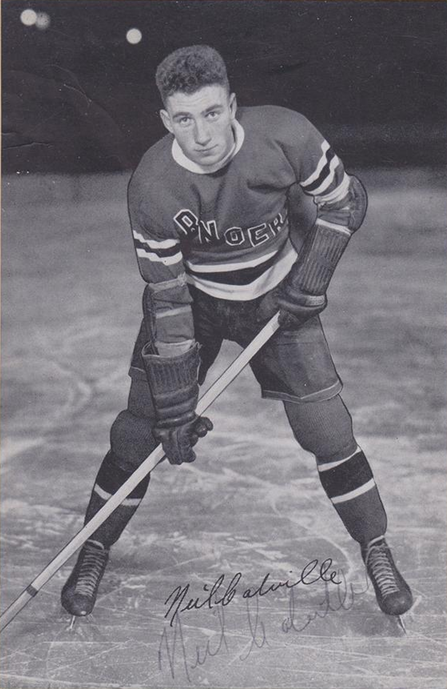
- Born: August 4, 1914 Edmonton, Alberta, Canada
- Died: December 26, 1987 (aged 73) Richmond, British Columbia, Canada
- Height: 5 ft 11 in (180 cm)
- Weight: 180 lb (82 kg; 12 st 12 lb)
- Position: Centre/Defence
- Shot: Right
- Played for: New York Rangers
- Playing career: 1934–1950

Neil McNeil Colville (August 4, 1914 – December 26, 1987) was a Canadian professional ice hockey player. Born in Edmonton, Alberta, he played for the New York Rangers in the National Hockey League with his brother Mac, winning the Stanley Cup in 1940.

== Playing career ==
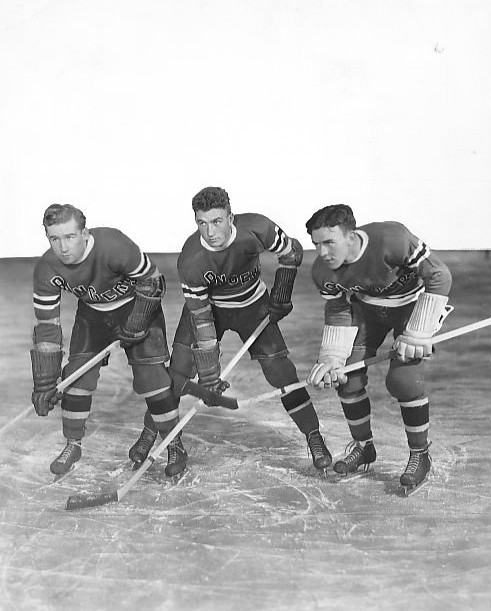
Mac Colville, Neil Colville (center) and Alex Shibicky in 1938 photo. All three are ranked in the 2009 book 100 Ranger Greats.

Colville joined the Rangers' farm team in 1934 and quickly made his way to the pros by 1936, centreing the "Bread Line" with his brother and Alex Shibicky, where he played until World War II. During the war, he and his brother were stationed in Ottawa and played on the army's Ottawa Commandos team, winning the Allan Cup in 1942.

After the war, they both returned the Rangers, this time as defencemen, the first pairs of brothers to ever do so in the NHL. Neil was adept at both defence and offense, and was the second player to be named to All-Star Teams as both a forward and a defenseman, behind Dit Clapper.

He retired in 1949 and became the Rangers' youngest coach a year later, but he was forced to resign due to health problems halfway through his second season.

== Post-playing career ==
In the 1950s, Colville was one of the primary founding investors in what would become Northern Television Systems, WHTV, in Whitehorse, Yukon, Canada. Colville eventually moved from Vancouver, B.C. to Whitehorse in order to run the small four-channel station alongside Bert Wybrew. He slept in a bunk in the studio and learned to do everything from fixing the equipment to hosting the news casts. Filling the air time without the benefit of extensive broadcasting infrastructure was at times difficult, and the station would run footage of downtown's Main Street or do live broadcasts of a goldfish bowl to fill the hours.

He was inducted into the Hockey Hall of Fame in 1967. He died in 1987 and there is a memorial bench in his honor at the Gary Point Park in Steveston, British Columbia.

In the 2009 book 100 Ranger Greats, the authors ranked Colville at No. 22 all-time of the 901 New York Rangers who had played during the team's first 82 seasons.

== Career statistics ==
=== Regular season and playoffs ===
			Regular season					Playoffs
Season	Team	League	GP	G	A	Pts	PIM	GP	G	A	Pts	PIM
1929–30	Edmonton Enarcos	EJrHL	12	1	0	1	—	—	—	—	—	—
1930–31	Edmonton Canadians	EJrHL	13	2	0	2	8	—	—	—	—	—
1931–32	Edmonton Poolers	EJrHL	11	7	3	10	—	4	2	1	3	0
1931–32	Edmonton Poolers	M-Cup	—	—	—	—	—	5	2	0	2	2
1932–33	Edmonton Athletic Club	EJrHL	11	—	—	—	10	3	0	0	0	2
1933–34	Edmonton Athletic Club	EJrHL	9	14	4	18	13	2	4	2	6	5
1933–34	Edmonton Athletic Club	M-Cup	—	—	—	—	—	12	15	6	21	4
1934–35	New York Crescents	EAHL	21	11	35	16	8	8	4	12	2
1935–36	New York Rangers	NHL	1	0	0	0	0	—	—	—	—	—
1935–36	Philadelphia Ramblers	Can-Am	35	15	16	31	8	4	0	2	2	0
1936–37	New York Rangers	NHL	45	10	18	28	33	9	3	3	6	0
1937–38	New York Rangers	NHL	45	17	19	36	11	3	0	1	1	0
1938–39	New York Rangers	NHL	47	18	19	37	12	7	0	2	2	2
1939–40	New York Rangers	NHL	48	19	19	38	22	12	2	7	9	18
1940–41	New York Rangers	NHL	48	14	28	42	28	3	1	1	2	0
1941–42	New York Rangers	NHL	48	8	25	33	37	6	0	5	5	6
1942–43	Ottawa Commandos	QSHL	22	12	30	42	32	—	—	—	—	—
1942–43	Ottawa Army	OCHL	12	11	12	23	6	—	—	—	—	—
1942–43	Ottawa Commandos	Al-Cup	—	—	—	—	—	12	14	14	28	17
1944–45	New York Rangers	NHL	4	0	1	1	2	—	—	—	—	—
1944–45	Winnipeg RCAF	WNDHL	6	5	4	9	4	—	—	—	—	—
1944–45	Ottawa Commandos	OCHL	2	0	0	0	0	—	—	—	—	—
1944–45	Quebec Aces	QSHL	5	1	2	3	0	7	2	5	7	4
1944–45	Quebec Aces	Al-Cup	—	—	—	—	—	3	0	3	3	0
1945–46	New York Rangers	NHL	49	5	4	9	25	—	—	—	—	—
1946–47	New York Rangers	NHL	60	4	16	20	16	—	—	—	—	—
1947–48	New York Rangers	NHL	55	4	12	16	25	6	1	0	1	6
1948–49	New York Rangers	NHL	14	0	5	5	2	—	—	—	—	—
1948–49	New Haven Ramblers	AHL	11	0	3	3	8	—	—	—	—	—
1949–50	New Haven Ramblers	AHL	17	3	4	7	13	—	—	—	—	—
NHL totals			464	99	166	265	213	46	7	19	26	32

== Coaching record ==
Team	Year	Regular season						Postseason
Team	Year	G	W	L	T	Pts	Division rank	Result
New York Rangers	1950–51	70	20	29	21	61	5th in NHL	Missed playoffs
New York Rangers	1951–52	23	6	12	5	17	5th in NHL	Fired
NHL Totals		93	26	41	26	78		

== See also ==
- List of NHL players who spent their entire career with one franchise

Sporting positions
Preceded by Ott Heller	New York Rangers captain 1945–49	Succeeded by Buddy O'Connor
Preceded by Lynn Patrick	Head coach of the New York Rangers; 1950–51	Succeeded by Bill Cook
