= Mac Colville =

Canadian ice hockey player

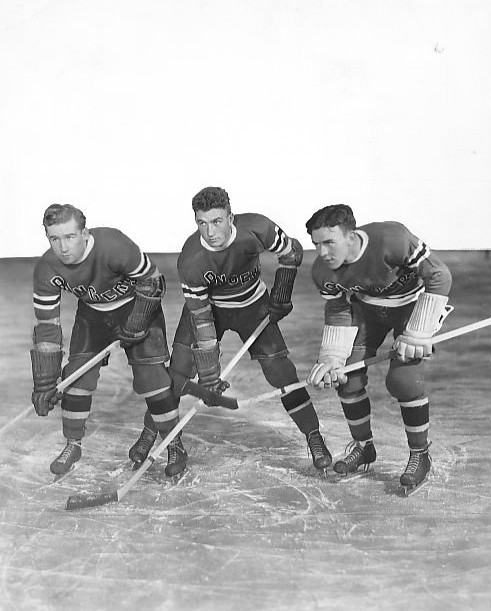
- Mac Colville, Neil Colville and Alex Shibicky in 1938. All three are ranked in the 2009 book 100 Ranger Greats.
- Born: January 8, 1916 Edmonton, Alberta, Canada
- Died: May 27, 2003 (aged 87) Calgary, Alberta, Canada
- Height: 5 ft 8 in (173 cm)
- Weight: 175 lb (79 kg; 12 st 7 lb)
- Position: Right wing
- Shot: Right
- Played for: New York Rangers
- Playing career: 1935–1951

Matthew Lamont "Mac" Colville (January 8, 1916 – May 27, 2003) was a professional ice hockey right winger. He played for the New York Rangers between 1935 and 1947, winning the Stanley Cup in 1940.

A native of Edmonton, Alberta, he was brother of Hall of Fame hockey player Neil Colville.

== Legacy ==
In the 2009 book 100 Ranger Greats, the authors ranked Colville at No. 55 all-time of the 901 New York Rangers who had played during the team's first 82 seasons.

== Career statistics ==
=== Regular season and playoffs ===
			Regular season					Playoffs
Season	Team	League	GP	G	A	Pts	PIM	GP	G	A	Pts	PIM
1930–31	Edmonton Poolers	EJrHL	3	0	0	0	0	—	—	—	—	—
1931–32	Edmonton Y's Men	AAHA	—	—	—	—	—	—	—	—	—	—
1932–33	Edmonton Poolers	EJrHL	11	—	—	—	—	3	0	0	0	0
1933–34	Edmonton Athletic Club	EJrHL	9	8	1	9	12	2	1	2	3	0
1933–34	Edmonton Athletic Club	M-Cup	—	—	—	—	—	13	8	7	15	10
1934–35	New York Crescents	EAHL	21	5	10	15	26	8	4	5	9	8
1935–36	New York Rangers	NHL	18	1	4	5	6	—	—	—	—	—
1935–36	Philadelphia Ramblers	Can-Am	16	3	15	18	26	4	2	2	4	0
1936–37	New York Rangers	NHL	46	7	12	19	10	9	1	2	3	2
1937–38	New York Rangers	NHL	48	14	14	28	18	3	0	2	2	0
1938–39	New York Rangers	NHL	48	7	21	28	24	7	1	2	3	4
1939–40	New York Rangers	NHL	47	7	14	21	12	12	3	2	5	6
1940–41	New York Rangers	NHL	47	14	17	31	18	3	1	1	2	2
1941–42	New York Rangers	NHL	46	14	16	30	26	6	3	1	4	0
1942–43	Ottawa Commandos	QSHL	19	7	7	14	19	11	2	5	7	10
1942–43	Ottawa Army	OCHL	9	6	3	9	4	—	—	—	—	—
1942–43	Ottawa Commandos	Al-Cup	—	—	—	—	—	12	11	9	20	15
1943–44	Red Deer Wheelers	ASHL	16	4	9	13	17	5	0	3	3	14
1945–46	New York Rangers	NHL	39	7	6	13	8	—	—	—	—	—
1946–47	New York Rangers	NHL	14	0	0	0	8	—	—	—	—	—
1946–47	New Haven Ramblers	AHL	45	1	9	10	28	2	0	0	0	2
1947–48	Vancouver Canucks	PCHL	—	—	—	—	—	—	—	—	—	—
1949–50	New Haven Ramblers	AHL	—	—	—	—	—	—	—	—	—	—
1950–51	Edmonton Flyers	WHL	48	7	18	25	71	8	1	1	2	0
NHL totals			353	71	104	175	130	40	9	10	19	14

== Honours and awards ==
- EAHL First All-Star Team, 1935
- Won the Stanley Cup in 1940 with the New York Rangers.
