= List of New York Rangers players =

This is a list of players who have played at least one game for the New York Rangers of the National Hockey League (NHL) from 1926–27 to the most recent complete season.

As of the completion of the 2018–19 New York Rangers season, a total of 932 skaters and 84 goalies have played for the Rangers in the 92 full seasons since starting in the 1926–27 New York Rangers season.

== Key ==
- * Appeared in a Rangers game during the 2025–2026 season.
- † Stanley Cup Champion or Hockey Hall of Famer.

Abbreviations
GP	Games played
SC	Stanley Cup Champion

Goaltenders
W	Wins
SO	Shutouts
L	Losses
GAA	Goals against average
T	Ties
OTL ^{a}	Overtime losses
SV%	Save percentage

Skaters
Pos	Position	RW	Right wing	A	Assists
D	Defenseman	C	Center	P	Points
LW	Left wing	G	Goals	PIM	Penalty minutes

The "Seasons" column lists the first year of the season of the player's first game and the last year of the season of the player's last game. For example, a player who played one game in the 2000–2001 season would be listed as playing with the team from 2000–2001, regardless of what calendar year the game occurred within.

Statistics complete as of the 2025–2026 NHL season.

== Goaltenders ==
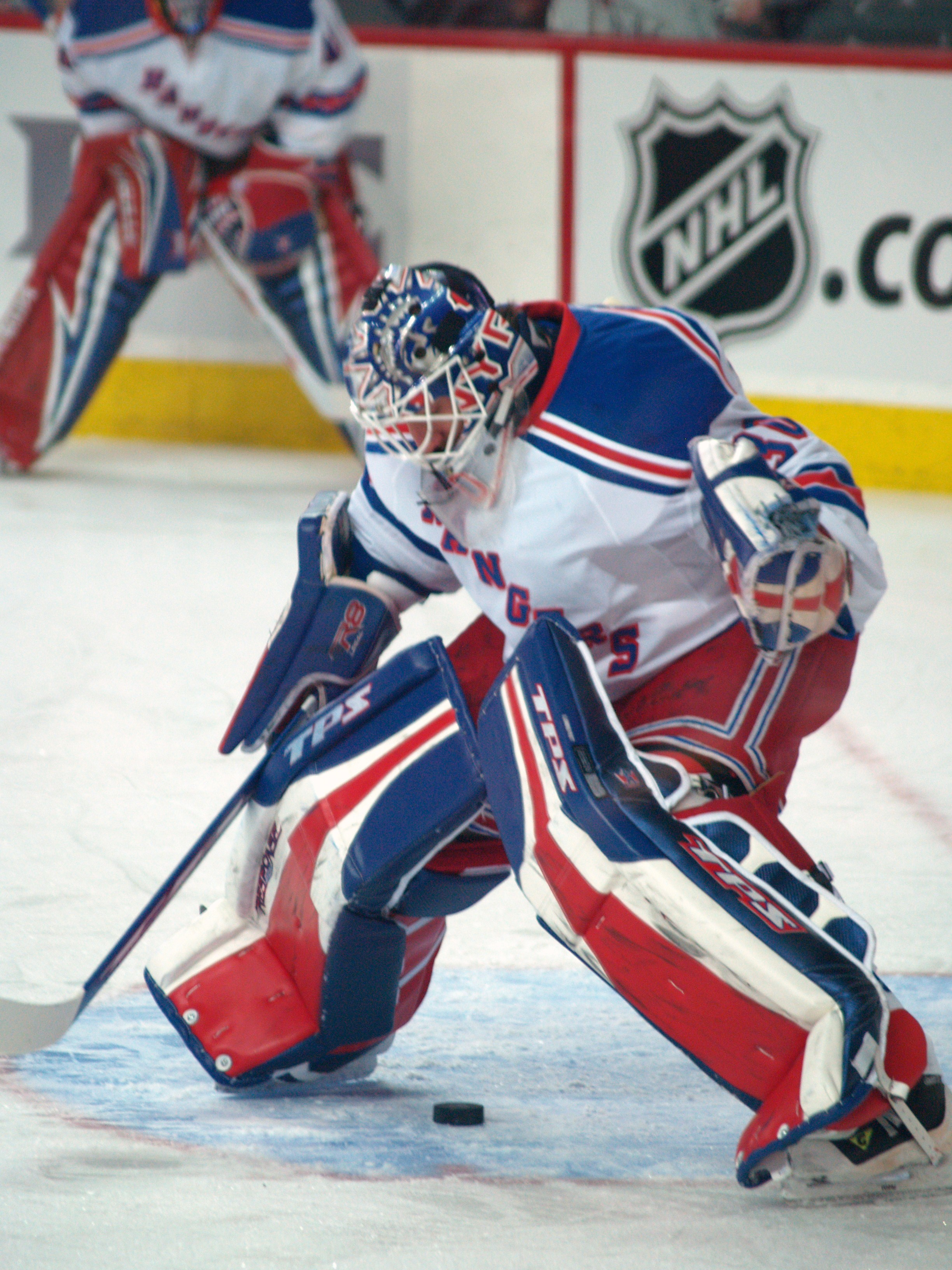
Henrik Lundqvist in 2008

Goalie	Nationality	Seasons	Regular season								Playoffs						Notes
Goalie	Nationality	Seasons	GP	W	L	T	OTL	SO	GAA	SV%	GP	W	L	SO	GAA	SV%	Notes
Aitkenhead, Andy†	Canada	1932–1935	106	47	43	16	—	11	2.35	—	10	6	2	3	1.48	—	SC 1933
Anderson, Lorne	Canada	1951–1952	3	1	2	0	—	0	6.00	—	—	—	—	—	—	—	
Astrom, Hardy	Sweden	1977–1978	4	2	2	0	—	0	3.50	—	—	—	—	—	—	—	
Auld, Alex	Canada	2009–2010	3	0	1	—	0	0	2.52	.904	—	—	—	—	—	—	
Baker, Steve	United States	1979–1983	57	20	20	11	—	3	3.70	—	14	7	7	0	4.00	—	
Bell, Gordon	Canada	1945–1946	8	3	5	0	—	0	3.87	—	2	1	1	0	4.50	—	
Beveridge, Bill	Canada	1942–1943	17	4	10	3	—	1	5.24	—	—	—	—	—	—	—	
Biron, Martin	Canada	2010–2014	46	22	15	—	3	2	2.47	.908	—	—	—	—	—	—	
Bouvrette, Lionel	Canada	1942–1943	1	0	1	0	—	0	6.00	—	—	—	—	—	—	—	
Bower, Johnny†	Canada	1953–1955	77	31	35	11	—	5	2.61	—	—	—	—	—	—	—	HHoF 1976
Buzinski, Steve	Canada	1942–1943	9	2	6	1	—	0	5.89	—	—	—	—	—	—	—	
Chabot, Lorne	Canada	1926–1928	80	41	25	14	—	21	1.61	—	8	2	3	2	1.50	—	
Cloutier, Dan	Canada	1997–1999	34	10	13	4	—	0	2.62	.912	—	—	—	—	—	—	
Davidson, John	Canada	1975–1983	222	93	90	25	—	7	3.58	—	30	16	13	1	3.38	—	
DeCourcy, Bob	Canada	1947–1948	1	0	1	0	—	0	12.41	—	—	—	—	—	—	—	
Domingue, Louis	Canada	2023–2025	2	2	0	—	0	0	1.50	.943	—	—	—	—	—	—	
Dryden, Dave	Canada	1961–1962	1	0	1	0	—	0	4.50	—	—	—	—	—	—	—	
Dunham, Mike	United States	2002–2004	100	35	47	11	—	7	2.70	.908	—	—	—	—	—	—	
Froese, Bob	Canada	1986–1990	98	36	43	8	—	1	3.63	.877	6	1	3	0	3.98	.869	
Francis, Emile†	Canada	1948–1952	22	7	9	5	—	0	3.19	—	—	—	—	—	—	—	HHoF 1982
Franks, Jimmy	Canada	1942–1943	23	5	14	4	—	0	4.48	—	—	—	—	—	—	—	
Gamble, Bruce	Canada	1958–1959	2	0	2	0	—	0	3.00	—	—	—	—	—	—	—	
Garand, Dylan*	Canada	2025–2026	3	2	0	—	1	0	1.62	.948	—	—	—	—	—	—	
Gardiner, Bert	Canada	1935–1936	1	1	0	0	—	0	1.00	—	6	3	3	0	1.66	—	
Georgiev, Alexandar	Russia	2017–2022	129	58	48	—	11	8	2.94	.908	2	0	1	0	2.04	.935	
Giacomin, Eddie†	Canada	1965–1976	538	266	172	89	—	49	2.73	—	65	29	35	1	2.81	—	HHoF 1987
Gratton, Gilles	Canada	1976–1977	41	11	18	7	—	0	4.22	—	—	—	—	—	—	—	
Halak, Jaroslav	Slovakia	2022–2023	25	10	9	—	5	1	2.72	.903	—	—	—	—	—	—	
Halverson, Brandon	United States	2017–2018	1	0	0	—	0	0	4.62	.833	—	—	—	—	—	—	
Hanlon, Glen	Canada	1982–1986	138	56	56	13	—	1	3.69	.886	12	2	7	1	4.33	.865	
Healy, Glenn†	Canada	1993–1997	113	40	44	18	—	6	2.79	.898	7	2	1	0	2.14	.901	SC 1994
Hebert, Guy	United States	2000–2001	13	5	7	1	—	0	3.43	.897	—	—	—	—	—	—	
Hellberg, Magnus	Sweden	2015–2017	3	1	0	—	0	0	2.42	.882	—	—	—	—	—	—	
Henry, Jim	Canada	1941–1948	109	47	44	17	—	4	3.16	—	6	2	4	1	2.17	—	
Hirsch, Corey	Canada	1992–1993	4	1	2	1	—	0	3.75	.879	—	—	—	—	—	—	
Hnilicka, Milan	Czech Republic	1999–2000	2	0	1	0	—	0	3.49	.886	—	—	—	—	—	—	
Holmqvist, Johan	Sweden	2000–2003	4	0	3	0	—	0	4.31	.868	—	—	—	—	—	—	
Holt, Chris	Canada	2005–2006	1	0	0	—	0	0	0.00	1.000	—	—	—	—	—	—	
Huska, Adam	Slovakia	2021–2022	1	0	1	—	0	0	7.04	.821	—	—	—	—	—	—	
Jackson, Percy	Canada	1934–1935	1	0	1	0	—	0	8.00	—	—	—	—	—	—	—	
Johnson, Chad	Canada	2009–2011	6	1	2	—	1	0	2.59	.911	—	—	—	—	—	—	
Kerr, Dave†	Canada	1934–1941	324	157	110	57	—	40	2.07	—	28	17	13	7	1.64	—	SC 1940
Kinkaid, Keith	United States	2020–2022	10	4	2	—	1	1	2.53	.903	—	—	—	—	—	—	
Kleisinger, Terry	Canada	1985–1986	4	0	2	0	—	0	4.40	.872	—	—	—	—	—	—	
Klymkiw, Julian	Canada	1958–1959	1	0	0	0	—	0	6.32	—	—	—	—	—	—	—	
LaBarbera, Jason	Canada	2000–2004	5	1	2	0	—	0	4.62	.828	—	—	—	—	—	—	
Labbe, Jean-Francois	Canada	1999–2000	1	0	1	0	—	0	3.00	.864	—	—	—	—	—	—	
Lumley, Harry†	Canada	1943–1944	1	0	0	0	—	0	0.00	—	—	—	—	—	—	—	HHoF 1980
Lundqvist, Henrik†	Sweden	2005–2020	887	459	310	—	96	64	2.43	.918	130	61	67	10	2.30	.921	HHoF 2023
Maniago, Cesare	Canada	1965–1967	34	9	15	5	—	2	3.54	—	—	—	—	—	—	—	
Markkanen, Jussi	Finland	2003–2004	26	8	12	1	—	2	2.56	.913	—	—	—	—	—	—	
Martin, Spencer*	Canada	2025–2026	6	1	3	—	0	0	4.13	.863	—	—	—	—	—	—	
McAuley, Ken	Canada	1943–1945	96	17	64	15	—	1	5.61	—	—	—	—	—	—	—	
McCartan, Jack	United States	1959–1961	12	2	7	3	—	1	3.71	—	—	—	—	—	—	—	
McDuffe, Peter	Canada	1972–1974	7	4	2	1	—	0	2.85	—	—	—	—	—	—	—	
McLean, Kirk	Canada	1999–2001	45	15	18	5	—	0	3.19	.892	—	—	—	—	—	—	
McLennan, Jamie	Canada	2003–2004	4	1	3	0	—	0	2.95	.876	—	—	—	—	—	—	
Miller, Joe†	Canada	1927–1928	—	—	—	—	—	—	—	—	3	2	1	1	1.00	—	SC 1928
Mio, Eddie	Canada	1981–1983	66	29	24	11	—	2	3.49	—	16	9	6	0	3.90	—	
Muzzatti, Jason	Canada	1997–1998	6	0	3	2	—	0	3.26	.891	—	—	—	—	—	—	
Olesevich, Danny	Canada	1961–1962	1	0	0	1	—	0	4.14	—	—	—	—	—	—	—	
Paille, Marcel	Canada	1957–1965	107	32	52	22	—	2	3.42	—	—	—	—	—	—	—	
Pavelec, Ondrej	Czech Republic	2017–2018	19	4	9	—	1	1	3.05	.910	—	—	—	—	—	—	
Pelletier, Marcel	Canada	1962–1963	2	0	1	0	—	0	4.50	—	—	—	—	—	—	—	
Plante, Jacques†	Canada	1963–1965	98	32	53	12	—	5	3.38	—	—	—	—	—	—	—	HHoF 1978
Quick, Jonathan*	United States	2023–2026	76	35	30	—	6	7	2.94	.899	—	—	—	—	—	—	
Raanta, Antti	Finland	2015–2017	55	27	14	—	4	5	2.26	.921	3	0	1	0	2.55	.895	
Ram, Jamie	Canada	1995–1996	1	0	0	0	—	0	0.00	1.000	—	—	—	—	—	—	
Rayner, Chuck†	Canada	1945–1953	376	123	180	72	—	24	2.99	—	18	9	9	1	2.43	—	HHoF 1973
Richter, Mike†	United States	1989–2003	666	301	258	73	—	24	2.89	.904	76	41	33	9	2.68	.909	SC 1994
Ridley, Curt	Canada	1974–1975	2	1	1	0	—	0	5.19	—	—	—	—	—	—	—	
Roach, John	Canada	1928–1932	180	80	63	37	—	30	2.16	—	21	9	10	5	1.63	—	
Rollins, Al	Canada	1959–1960	10	3	4	3	—	0	3.10	—	—	—	—	—	—	—	
Sawchuk, Terry†	Canada	1969–1970	8	3	1	2	—	1	2.91	—	3	0	1	0	4.50	—	HHoF 1971
Schaefer, Joe	United States	1959–1961	2	0	2	0	—	0	5.58	—	—	—	—	—	—	—	
Scott, Ron	Canada	1983–1988	16	3	7	4	—	0	3.84	.868	—	—	—	—	—	—	
Shesterkin, Igor*	Russia	2019–2026	325	187	107	—	28	22	2.52	.917	44	23	20	0	2.41	.928	
Simmons, Don	Canada	1965–1968	22	5	10	4	—	0	3.46	—	—	—	—	—	—	—	
Skapski, Mackenzie	Canada	2014–2015	2	2	0	—	0	1	0.50	.978	—	—	—	—	—	—	
Soetaert, Doug	Canada	1975–1981; 1986–1987	103	35	40	15	—	1	4.03	.842	—	—	—	—	—	—	
Stevenson, Doug	Canada	1944–1945	4	0	4	0	—	0	4.50	—	—	—	—	—	—	—	
Talbot, Cam	Canada	2013–2015	57	33	15	—	5	8	2.00	.931	2	0	1	0	2.61	.846	
Tataryn, Dave	Canada	1976–1977	2	1	1	0	—	0	7.50	—	—	—	—	—	—	—	
Thomas, Wayne	Canada	1977–1981	94	34	43	11	—	5	3.63	—	1	0	1	0	4.00	—	
Vanbiesbrouck, John	United States	1981–1993	449	200	177	47	—	16	3.45	.889	38	13	20	2	2.56	.917	
Valiquette, Steve	Canada	2003–2010	39	14	14	0	5	4	2.78	.901	2	0	0	0	0.00	1.000	
Villemure, Gilles	Canada	1963–1975	184	98	53	23	—	13	2.62	—	14	5	5	0	2.93	—	
Weekes, Kevin	Canada	2005–2007	46	18	20	—	5	0	3.08	.890	1	0	1	0	4.00	.840	
Weeks, Steve	Canada	1980–1984	94	42	33	14	—	1	3.83	.865	5	1	2	0	4.27	—	
Wilson, Dunc	Canada	1974–1976	23	6	11	3	—	0	3.92	—	—	—	—	—	—	—	
Winkler, Hal	Canada	1926–1927	8	3	4	1	—	2	1.87	—	—	—	—	—	—	—	
Yeremeyev, Vitali	Kazakhstan	2000–2001	4	0	4	0	—	0	4.53	.846	—	—	—	—	—	—	

== Skaters ==
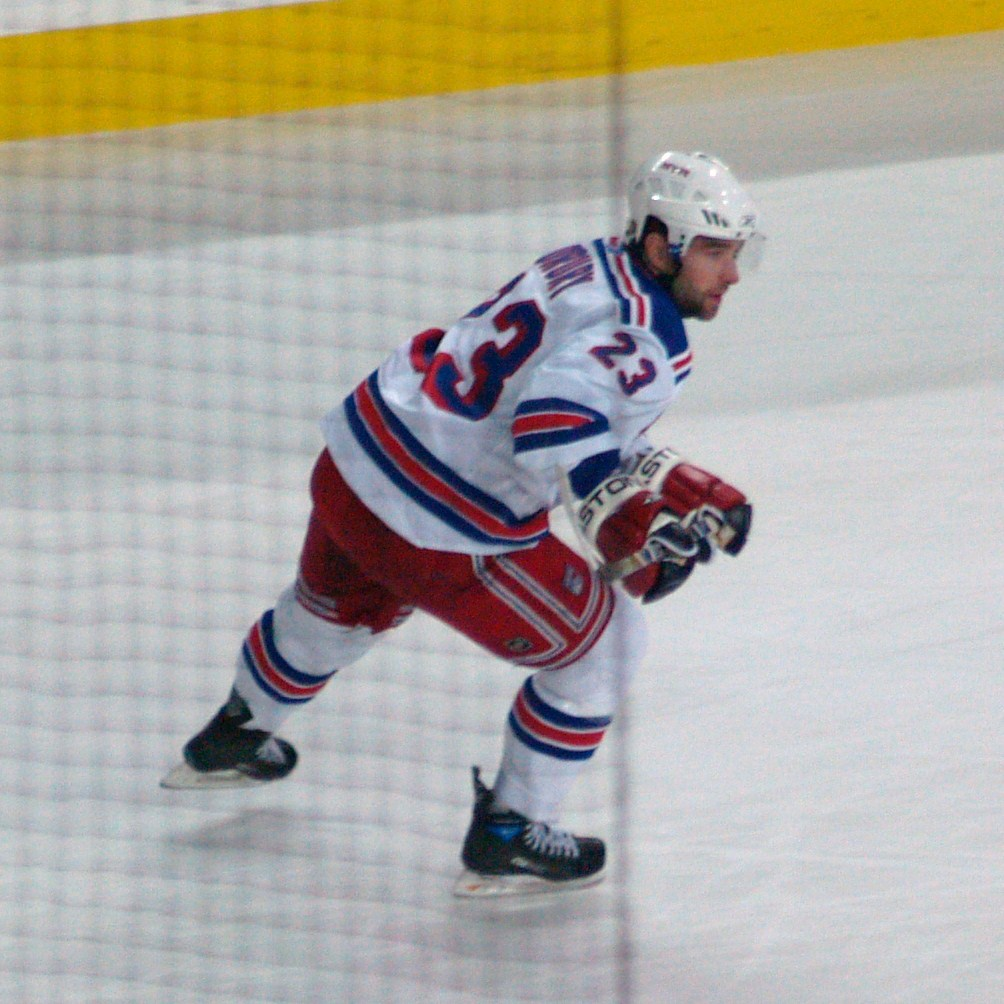
Chris Drury during a game in 2008

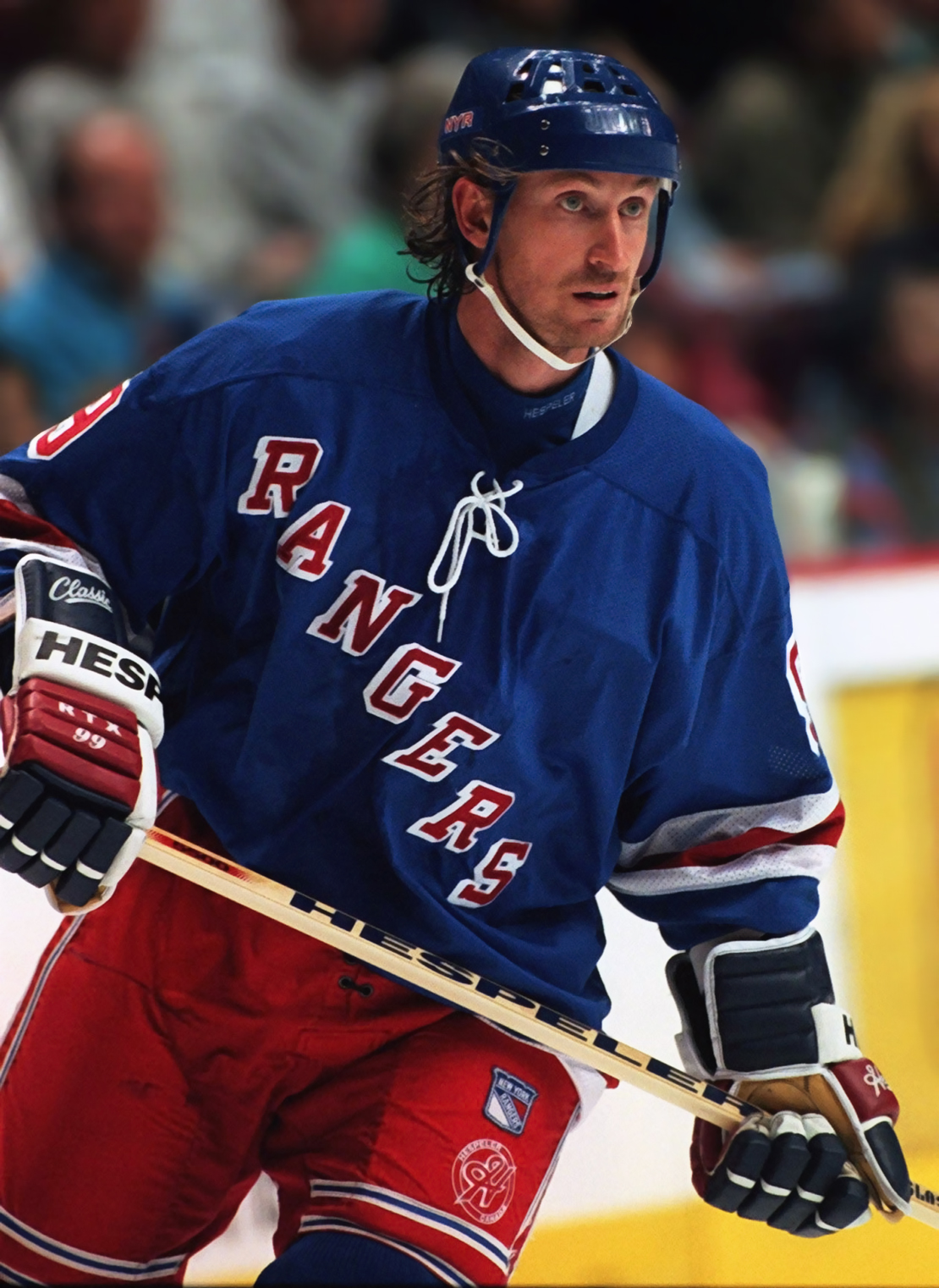
Wayne Gretzky

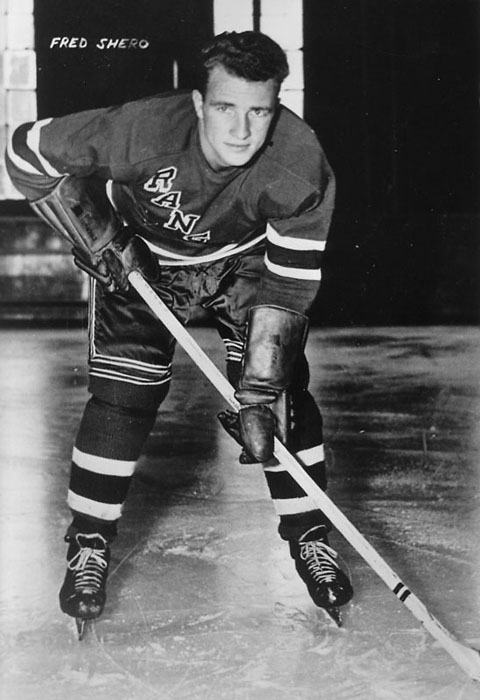
Fred Shero in 1948

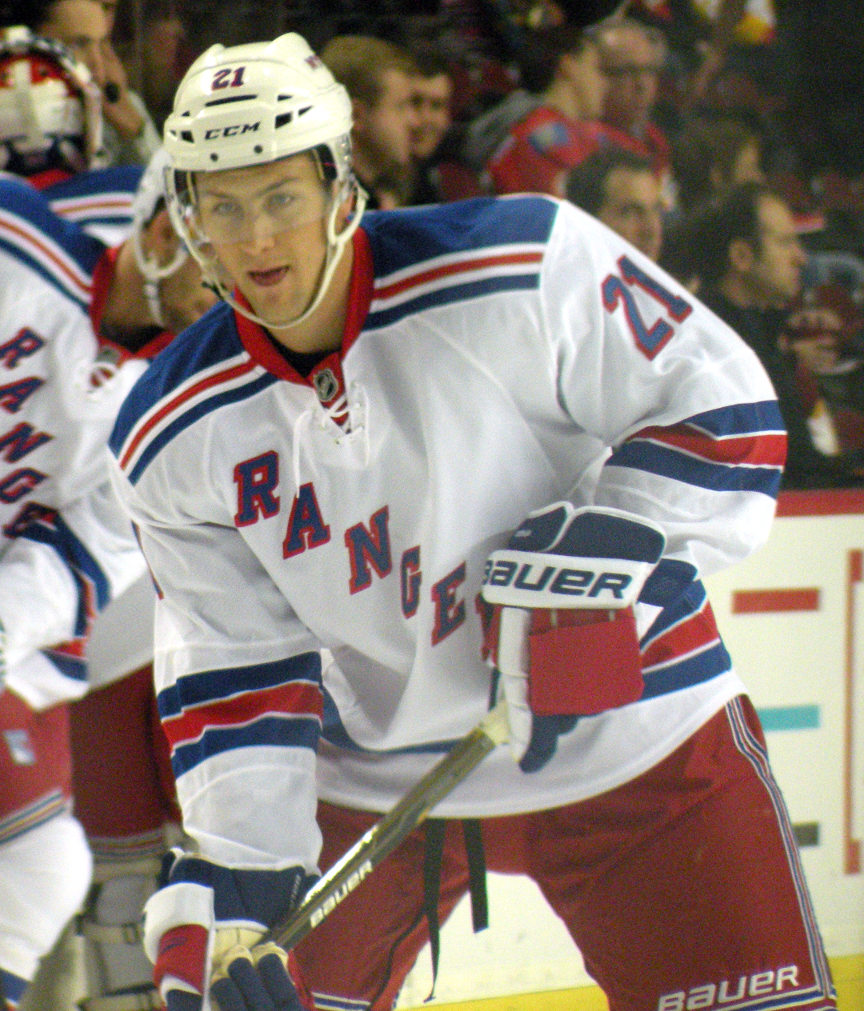
Derek Stepan in 2012

Skater	Nationality	Pos	Seasons	Regular season					Playoffs					Notes
Skater	Nationality	Pos	Seasons	GP	G	A	P	PIM	GP	G	A	P	PIM	Notes
Abel, Clarence	United States	D	1926–1929	111	11	6	17	17	26	1	1	2	30	
Adam, Doug	Canada	LW	1949–1950	4	0	1	1	0	—	—	—	—	—	
Ailsby, Lloyd	Canada	D	1951–1952	3	0	0	0	2	—	—	—	—	—	
Albright, Clint	Canada	C	1948–1949	59	14	5	19	19	—	—	—	—	—	
Allen, Conor	United States	D	2013–2015	7	0	0	0	4	—	—	—	—	—	
Allen, George	Canada	D	1938–1939	19	6	6	12	10	7	0	0	0	4	
Allison, Mike	Canada	LW	1980–1986	266	63	102	165	297	53	4	16	20	90	
Allum, Bill	Canada	D	1940–1941	1	0	1	1	0	—	—	—	—	—	
Amonte, Tony	United States	RW	1991–1994	234	84	99	183	135	15	3	8	11	4	
Anderson, Glenn†	Canada	RW	1993–1994	12	4	2	6	12	23	3	3	6	42	HHoF 2008; SC 1994
Andersson, Kent-Erik	Sweden	RW	1982–1984	134	13	35	48	22	14	0	1	1	0	
Andersson, Lias	Sweden	C	2017–2020	66	3	6	9	33	—	—	—	—	—	
Andersson, Peter	Sweden	D	1992–1994	39	5	12	17	20	—	—	—	—	—	
Andrascik, Steve	Canada	RW	1971–1972	—	—	—	—	—	1	0	0	0	0	
Andrea, Paul	Canada	RW	1965–1966	4	1	1	2	0	—	—	—	—	—	
Angotti, Lou	Canada	C	1964–1966	91	11	10	21	22	—	—	—	—	—	
Anisimov, Artem	Russia	C	2008–2012	244	46	62	108	37	26	4	7	11	4	
Anslow, Hub	Canada	C	1947–1948	2	0	0	0	0	—	—	—	—	—	
Apps, Jr., Syl	Canada	C	1970–1971	31	1	2	3	11	—	—	—	—	—	
Archibald, Dave	Canada	C	1989–1990	19	2	3	5	6	—	—	—	—	—	
Armstrong, Derek	Canada	C	1998–2001	7	0	0	0	0	—	—	—	—	—	
Asmundson, Oscar†	Canada	C	1932–1934	94	7	16	23	28	9	0	2	2	4	SC 1933
Atanas, Walt	Canada	RW	1944–1945	49	13	8	21	40	—	—	—	—	—	
Attwell, Ron	Canada	RW	1967–1968	4	0	0	0	2	—	—	—	—	—	
Aube-Kubel, Nicolas	Canada	RW	2024–2025	3	0	0	0	2	—	—	—	—	—	
Aubuchon, Oscar	Canada	LW	1943–1944	38	16	12	28	4	—	—	—	—	—	
Avery, Sean	Canada	C	2006–2012	264	45	78	123	601	28	5	10	15	69	
Awrey, Don	Canada	D	1977–1978	78	2	8	10	38	3	0	0	0	6	
Ayres, Vernon	Canada	D	1935–1936	28	0	4	4	38	—	—	—	—	—	
Babando, Pete	United States	LW	1952–1953	29	4	4	8	4	—	—	—	—	—	
Backman, Christian	Sweden	D	2007–2008	18	2	6	8	20	8	0	0	0	12	
Backman, Mike	Canada	RW	1981–1984	18	1	6	7	18	10	2	2	4	2	
Baker, Bill	United States	D	1982–1983	70	4	14	18	64	2	0	0	0	0	
Balej, Jozef	Slovakia	RW	2003–2004	13	1	4	5	4	—	—	—	—	—	
Balon, Dave	Canada	LW	1959–1963; 1968–1972	361	99	113	212	284	29	7	6	13	38	
Bandura, Jeff	Canada	D	1980–1981	2	0	1	1	0	—	—	—	—	—	
Bannister, Drew	Canada	D	2000–2001	3	0	0	0	0	—	—	—	—	—	
Baranka, Ivan	Slovakia	D	2007–2008	1	0	1	1	0	—	—	—	—	—	
Barnaby, Matthew	Canada	RW	2001–2004	196	34	55	89	406	—	—	—	—	—	
Barr, Dave	Canada	RW	1983–1984	6	0	0	0	2	—	—	—	—	—	
Barron, Morgan	Canada	C	2020–2022	18	1	1	2	6	—	—	—	—	—	
Bartlett, Jim	Canada	LW	1955–1960	126	19	14	33	174	—	—	—	—	—	
Barton, Cliff	United States	RW	1939–1940	3	0	0	0	0	—	—	—	—	—	
Bathgate, Andy†	Canada	RW	1952–1964	719	272	457	729	444	22	9	7	16	39	HHoF 1978
Bathgate, Frank	Canada	C	1952–1953	2	0	0	0	2	—	—	—	—	—	
Beaton, Frank	Canada	LW	1978–1980	25	1	1	2	43	—	—	—	—	—	
Beck, Barry	Canada	D	1979–1986	415	66	173	239	775	49	10	22	32	77	
Beck, Taylor	Canada	RW	2016–2017	2	0	0	0	0	—	—	—	—	—	
Bednarski, John	Canada	D	1974–1977	99	2	18	20	114	1	0	0	0	17	
Beleskey, Matt	Canada	LW	2017–2019	5	1	0	1	9	—	—	—	—	—	
Belisle, Dan	Canada	RW	1960–1961	4	2	0	2	0	—	—	—	—	—	
Bell, Bruce	Canada	D	1987–1988	13	1	2	3	8	—	—	—	—	—	
Bell, Harry	Canada	RW	1946–1947	1	0	1	1	0	—	—	—	—	—	
Bell, Joe	Canada	LW	1942–1947	62	8	9	17	18	—	—	—	—	—	
Bend, Linthwaite	Canada	C	1942–1943	8	3	1	4	2	—	—	—	—	—	
Bennett, Curt	Canada	LW	1972–1973	16	0	1	1	11	—	—	—	—	—	
Bennett, Rick	United States	LW	1989–1992	15	1	1	2	13	—	—	—	—	—	
Bentley, Doug†	Canada	LW	1953–1954	20	2	10	12	2	—	—	—	—	—	HHoF 1964
Bentley, Max†	Canada	C	1953–1954	57	14	18	32	15	—	—	—	—	—	HHoF 1966
Berard, Brett*	United States	LW	2024–2026	48	6	4	10	14	—	—	—	—	—	
Berard, Bryan	United States	D	2001–2002	82	2	21	23	60	—	—	—	—	—	
Berenson, Gordon	Canada	C	1966–1968	49	2	6	8	4	4	0	1	1	2	
Berg, Bill	Canada	LW	1995–1998	152	11	16	27	100	13	1	0	1	2	
Betts, Blair	Canada	C	2005–2009	304	25	15	40	84	28	1	1	2	8	
Beukeboom, Jeff†	Canada	D	1991–1999	520	18	72	90	1,157	70	2	13	15	147	SC 1994
Beverley, Nick	Canada	D	1974–1977	139	4	23	27	67	3	0	1	1	0	
Bitetto, Anthony	United States	D	2020–2021	14	1	3	4	20	—	—	—	—	—	
Blackburn, Bob	Canada	D	1968–1969	11	0	0	0	4	—	—	—	—	—	
Blackburn, Don	Canada	LW	1969–1971	4	0	0	0	0	—	—	—	—	—	
Blackwell, Colin	United States	C	2020–2021	47	12	10	22	15	—	—	—	—	—	
Blais, Sammy	Canada	LW	2021–2023	54	0	9	9	25	—	—	—	—	—	
Blaisdell, Mike	Canada	RW	1983–1985	48	6	6	12	42	—	—	—	—	—	
Blidh, Anton*	Sweden	LW	2023–2026	5	0	1	1	2	—	—	—	—	—	
Bloemberg, Jeff	Canada	D	1988–1992	43	3	6	9	25	7	0	3	3	5	
Bonino, Nick	United States	C	2023–2024	45	1	4	5	8	—	—	—	—	—	
Blouin, Sylvain	Canada	LW	1996–1998	7	0	0	0	23	—	—	—	—	—	
Boogaard, Derek	Canada	LW	2010–2011	22	1	1	2	45	—	—	—	—	—	
Borgen, Will*	United States	D	2024–2026	126	9	19	28	74	—	—	—	—	—	
Bothwell, Tim	Canada	D	1978–1982	62	4	10	14	32	9	0	0	0	8	
Bouchard, Dick	Canada	RW	1954–1955	1	0	0	0	0	—	—	—	—	—	
Bouchard, Joel	Canada	D	2003–2004	55	6	14	20	24	—	—	—	—	—	
Boucher, Frank†	Canada	C	1926–1944	533	152	261	413	115	54	16	20	36	12	HHoF 1958; SC 1928, 1933
Bourgeault, Leo†	Canada	D	1926–1931	155	17	11	28	225	20	1	1	2	18	SC 1928
Bourque, Phil	United States	LW	1992–1994	71	6	15	21	47	—	—	—	—	—	
Boutilier, Paul	Canada	D	1987–1988	4	0	1	1	6	—	—	—	—	—	
Bownass, Jack	Canada	D	1958–1962	76	3	7	10	58	—	—	—	—	—	
Boyd, Billy	Canada	RW	1926–1930	95	8	1	9	56	10	0	0	0	4	
Boyle, Brian	United States	C	2009–2014	355	44	46	90	265	58	9	10	19	42	
Boyle, Dan	Canada	D	2014–2016	139	19	25	44	50	23	3	8	11	2	
Brashear, Donald	United States	LW	2009–2010	36	0	1	1	73	—	—	—	—	—	
Brassard, Derick	Canada	C	2012–2016	254	69	105	174	110	59	18	26	44	30	
Braun, Justin	United States	D	2021–2022	8	1	1	2	0	19	0	1	1	6	
Brennan, Doug†	Canada	D	1931–1934	123	9	7	16	152	16	1	0	1	21	SC 1933
Brennan, Rich	United States	D	1998–1999	24	1	3	4	23	—	—	—	—	—	
Brenneman, John	Canada	LW	1964–1966	33	3	3	6	20	—	—	—	—	—	
Brickley, Connor	United States	C	2018–2019	14	1	3	4	9	—	—	—	—	—	
Brisson, Brendan*	United States	C	2025–2026	3	0	1	1	0	—	—	—	—	—	
Brochu, Stephane	Canada	D	1988–1989	1	0	0	0	0	—	—	—	—	—	
Brodzinski, Jonny*	United States	C	2020–2026	207	27	32	59	46	4	0	0	0	2	
Brooke, Bob	United States	C	1983–1987	175	35	36	71	214	24	6	9	15	43	
Broten, Paul	United States	RW	1989–1993	194	27	33	60	194	24	2	3	5	14	
Brown, Arnie	Canada	D	1964–1971	460	33	98	131	545	18	0	6	6	23	
Brown, Brad	Canada	D	2000–2001	48	1	3	4	107	—	—	—	—	—	
Brown, Harold	Canada	RW	1945–1946	13	2	1	3	2	—	—	—	—	—	
Brown, Larry	Canada	D	1969–1971	46	1	4	5	18	11	0	1	1	0	
Brown, Stan	Canada	D	1927–1928	24	6	2	8	14	2	0	0	0	0	
Brubaker, Jeff	United States	LW	1987–1988	31	2	0	2	78	—	—	—	—	—	
Brydson, Glenn	Canada	RW	1935–1936	30	4	12	16	7	—	—	—	—	—	
Buchanan, Ralph	Canada	C/RW	1948–1949	2	0	0	0	0	—	—	—	—	—	
Buchnevich, Pavel	Russia	LW	2016–2021	301	79	116	195	112	8	0	1	1	6	
Buller, Hy	Canada	D	1951–1954	179	22	55	77	209	—	—	—	—	—	
Bure, Pavel	Russia	RW	2001–2003	51	31	19	50	22	—	—	—	—	—	HHoF 2012
Burnett, Kelly	Canada	C	1952–1953	3	1	0	1	0	—	—	—	—	—	
Burns, Gary	Canada	LW	1980–1981	11	2	2	4	18	5	0	0	0	2	
Burns, Norm	Canada	C	1941–1942	11	0	4	4	2	—	—	—	—	—	
Butler, Jerry	Canada	RW	1972–1975	112	24	26	50	130	15	1	2	3	41	
Byers, Dane	Canada	C	2007–2010	6	1	0	1	31	—	—	—	—	—	
Byers, Jerry	Canada	LW	1977–1978	7	2	1	3	0	—	—	—	—	—	
Cahan, Larry	Canada	D	1956–1964	303	19	39	58	337	14	0	0	0	16	
Cairns, Eric	Canada	D	1996–1998	79	0	4	4	239	3	0	0	0	0	
Callahan, Ryan	United States	RW	2006–2014	450	132	122	254	268	59	14	10	24	38	
Callighen, Frank†	Canada	D	1927–1928	36	0	0	0	32	9	0	0	0	0	SC 1928
Cameron, Scotty	Canada	C	1942–1943	35	8	11	19	0	—	—	—	—	—	
Carcillo, Daniel	Canada	LW	2013–2014	31	3	0	3	43	8	2	0	2	22	
Carey, Paul	United States	C	2017–2018	60	7	7	14	20	—	—	—	—	—	
Carkner, Terry	Canada	D	1986–1987	52	2	13	15	118	1	0	0	0	0	
Carpenter, Bobby	United States	C	1986–1987	28	2	8	10	20	—	—	—	—	—	
Carpenter, Ryan	United States	C	2022–2023	22	1	2	3	10	—	—	—	—	—	
Carr, Gene	Canada	C	1971–1974	138	18	23	41	90	17	1	4	5	21	
Carr, Lorne	Canada	RW	1933–1934	14	0	0	0	4	—	—	—	—	—	
Carrick, Sam*	Canada	C	2024–2026	140	10	20	30	111	—	—	—	—	—	
Carrigan, Gene	Canada	C	1930–1931	33	2	0	2	13	—	—	—	—	—	
Carse, Bill	Canada	C	1938–1939	1	0	1	1	0	—	—	—	—	—	
Carson, Gerald	Canada	D	1928–1929	14	0	0	0	5	—	—	—	—	—	
Carter, Anson	Canada	RW	2002–2004	54	11	11	22	20	—	—	—	—	—	
Catenacci, Daniel	Canada	C	2017–2018	1	0	0	0	0	—	—	—	—	—	
Caufield, Jay	United States	RW	1986–1987	13	2	1	3	45	3	0	0	0	0	
Chalmers, William	Canada	C	1953–1954	1	0	0	0	0	—	—	—	—	—	
Charlesworth, Todd	Canada	D	1989–1990	7	0	0	0	6	—	—	—	—	—	
Chartraw, Rick	United States	D	1982–1984	30	2	2	4	41	9	0	2	2	6	
Chmelař, Jaroslav*	Czech Republic	RW	2025–2026	28	4	2	6	11	—	—	—	—	—	
Christensen, Erik	Canada	C	2009–2012	132	20	38	58	44	5	1	0	1	2	
Chrystal, Bob	Canada	D	1953–1955	132	11	14	25	112	—	—	—	—	—	
Churla, Shane	Canada	RW	1995–1997	55	0	1	1	132	26	2	2	4	34	
Chytil, Filip	Czech Republic	C	2017–2025	378	75	89	164	94	36	8	5	13	8	
Ciesla, Hank	Canada	C	1957–1959	129	8	20	28	37	6	0	2	2	0	
Ciger, Zdeno	Slovakia	LW	2001–2002	29	6	7	13	16	—	—	—	—	—	
Cirella, Joe	Canada	D	1990–1993	141	7	18	25	258	19	0	6	6	49	
Claesson, Fredrik	Sweden	D	2018–2019	37	2	4	6	9	—	—	—	—	—	
Clark, Dan	Canada	D	1978–1979	4	0	1	1	6	—	—	—	—	—	
Clendening, Adam	United States	D	2016–2017	31	2	9	11	17	—	—	—	—	—	
Cline, Bruce	Canada	RW	1956–1957	30	2	3	5	10	—	—	—	—	—	
Collins, Bill	Canada	RW	1975–1976	50	4	4	8	38	—	—	—	—	—	
Colville, Mac†	Canada	RW/D	1935–1947	353	71	104	175	130	40	9	10	19	14	SC 1940
Colville, Neil†	Canada	C/D	1935–1949	464	99	166	265	213	46	7	19	26	32	SC 1940; HHoF 1967
Colwill, Les	Canada	RW	1958–1959	69	7	6	13	16	—	—	—	—	—	
Conacher, Jim	Canada	C	1951–1953	33	1	5	6	4	—	—	—	—	—	
Conacher, Pat	Canada	LW	1979–1983	22	0	6	6	8	4	0	1	1	2	
Connelly, Bert	Canada	LW	1934–1936	72	12	13	25	33	4	1	0	1	0	
Connor, Cam	Canada	RW	1979–1983	28	1	6	7	81	12	4	0	4	6	
Cook, Bill†	Canada	RW	1926–1937	474	229	138	367	386	46	13	11	24	68	SC 1928, 1933; HHoF 1952
Cook, Bun†	Canada	LW	1926–1936	433	154	139	293	436	46	15	3	18	50	SC 1928, 1933; HHoF 1995
Cooper, Hal	Canada	RW	1944–1945	8	0	0	0	2	—	—	—	—	—	
Cooper, Joe	Canada	D	1935–1938; 1946–1947	154	5	13	18	136	12	1	1	2	16	
Copp, Andrew	United States	C	2021–2022	16	8	10	18	8	20	6	8	14	2	
Coulter, Art†	Canada	D	1935–1942	287	18	67	85	342	37	2	5	7	46	SC 1940; HHoF 1974
Courtnall, Russ	Canada	RW	1996–1997	14	2	5	7	2	15	3	4	7	0	
Cox, Danny	Canada	LW	1933–1934	13	5	0	5	2	2	0	0	0	0	
Cracknell, Adam	Canada	RW	2017–2018	4	0	0	0	0	—	—	—	—	—	
Crawford, Bob	Canada	RW	1985–1987	14	1	2	3	12	7	0	1	1	8	
Creighton, Dave	Canada	C	1955–1958	210	55	87	142	125	16	5	5	10	4	
Cross, Cory	Canada	D	2002–2003	26	0	4	4	16	—	—	—	—	—	
Cullen, Brian	Canada	C	1959–1961	106	19	40	59	12	—	—	—	—	—	
Cullen, Matt	United States	C	2006–2007	80	16	25	41	52	10	1	3	4	6	
Cullen, Ray	Canada	C	1965–1966	8	1	3	4	0	—	—	—	—	—	
Cunningham, Bob	Canada	C	1960–1962	4	0	1	1	0	—	—	—	—	—	
Cushenan, Ian	Canada	D	1959–1960	17	0	1	1	22	—	—	—	—	—	
Cuylle, Will*	Canada	LW	2022–2026	249	53	51	104	173	16	1	1	2	8	
Cyr, Paul	Canada	LW	1987–1989	41	4	13	17	43	—	—	—	—	—	
Dahlen, Ulf	Sweden	LW	1987–1990	189	71	60	131	106	—	—	—	—	—	
Daigle, Alexandre	Canada	C	1999–2000	58	8	18	26	23	—	—	—	—	—	
D'Amore, Hank	Canada	C	1943–1944	4	1	0	1	2	—	—	—	—	—	
Davidson, Gordon	Canada	D	1942–1944	51	3	6	9	8	—	—	—	—	—	
Davies, Ken	Canada	C	1947–1948	—	—	—	—	—	1	0	0	0	0	
Dawe, Jason	Canada	RW	1999–2002	4	0	1	1	—	—	—	—	—		
Dawes, Nigel	Canada	LW	2006–2009	121	25	24	49	25	11	2	2	4	0	
de Haan, Calvin	Canada	D	2024–2025	3	0	1	1	2	—	—	—	—	—	
de Vries, Greg	Canada	D	2003–2004	53	3	12	15	37	—	—	—	—	—	
Dea, Billy	Canada	LW	1953–1954	14	1	1	2	2	—	—	—	—	—	
DeBlois, Lucien	Canada	C	1977–1980; 1986–1989	326	57	79	136	297	18	2	0	2	12	
Del Zotto, Michael	Canada	D	2009–2014	292	26	95	121	116	32	3	9	12	20	
Delory, Val	Canada	LW	1948–1949	1	0	0	0	0	—	—	—	—	—	
DeAngelo, Tony	United States	D	2017–2021	167	19	73	92	139	3	0	1	1	16	
Dewar, Tom	Canada	C	1943–1947	180	67	86	153	36	—	—	—	—	—	
Demers, Tony	Canada	RW	1943–1944	1	0	0	0	0	—	—	—	—	—	
Denis, Jean-Paul	Canada	RW	1946–1950	10	0	2	2	2	—	—	—	—	—	
Desharnais, David	Canada	C	2017–2018	71	6	22	28	18	—	—	—	—	—	
Desjardins, Victor	United States	C	1931–1932	48	3	3	6	16	7	0	0	0	0	
Deveaux, Andre	Canada	C	2011–2012	9	0	1	1	29	—	—	—	—	—	
Dewar, Tom	Canada	D	1943–1944	9	0	2	2	4	—	—	—	—	—	
Diaz, Raphael	Switzerland	D	2013–2014; 2015–2016	11	1	1	2	4	5	0	1	1	0	
Dickenson, Herb	Canada	W	1951–1953	48	18	17	35	10	—	—	—	—	—	
Di Giuseppe, Phillip	Canada	LW	2019–2021	51	2	10	12	15	3	0	0	0	0	
Dill, Bob	United States	D	1943–1945	76	15	15	30	135	—	—	—	—	—	
Dillon, Cecil†	United States	RW	1930–1939	409	160	121	281	93	38	13	9	22	14	SC 1933
Dillon, Wayne	Canada	C	1975–1978	216	43	66	109	58	3	0	1	1	0	
DiMaio, Rob	Canada	RW	1999–2000	12	1	3	4	8	—	—	—	—	—	
Dionne, Marcel†	Canada	D	1986–1989	118	42	56	98	80	6	1	1	2	2	HHoF 1992
Djoos, Par	Sweden	D	1991–1993	56	2	19	21	42	—	—	—	—	—	
Doak, Gary	Canada	D	1971–1972	49	1	10	11	54	12	0	0	0	46	
Domi, Tie	Canada	RW	1990–1993	82	5	4	9	526	6	1	1	2	32	
Donato, Ted	United States	LW	2002–2003	49	2	1	3	6	—	—	—	—	—	
Donnelly, Mike	United States	LW	1986–1988	22	3	3	6	8	—	—	—	—	—	
Dore, Andre	Canada	D	1978–1983; 1984–1985	139	8	38	46	153	10	1	1	2	16	
Dorey, Jim	Canada	D	1971–1972	1	0	0	0	0	—	—	—	—	—	
Dowling, Justin*	Canada	C	2025–2026	2	0	0	0	0	—	—	—	—	—	
Driver, Bruce	Canada	D	1995–1998	220	13	74	87	136	26	0	8	8	6	
Drummond, Jim	Canada	D	1944–1945	2	0	0	0	0	—	—	—	—	—	
Drury, Chris	United States	C	2007–2011	264	62	89	151	116	21	4	4	8	12	
Dube, Christian	Canada	C	1996–1999	33	1	1	2	4	3	0	0	0	0	
Dubinsky, Brandon	United States	C	2006–2012	393	81	132	213	457	31	7	10	17	46	
Duclair, Anthony	Canada	LW	2014–2015	18	1	6	7	4	—	—	—	—	—	
Duff, Dick†	Canada	LW	1963–1965	43	7	13	20	22	—	—	—	—	—	HHoF 2006
Dufour, Marc	Canada	RW	1963–1965	12	1	0	1	2	—	—	—	—	—	
Duguay, Ron	Canada	C/RW	1977–1983; 1986–1988	499	164	176	340	370	63	26	19	45	99	
Duncanson, Craig	Canada	LW	1992–1993	3	0	1	1	0	—	—	—	—	—	
Dupont, Andre	Canada	D	1970–1971	7	1	2	3	21	—	—	—	—	—	
Dupuis, Pascal	Canada	LW	2006–2007	6	1	0	1	0	—	—	—	—	—	
Dusablon, Benoit	Canada	C	2003–2004	3	0	0	0	2	—	—	—	—	—	
Dutkowski, L. S.	Canada	D	1933–1934	29	0	6	6	18	2	0	0	0	0	
Dvorak, Radek	Czech Republic	RW	1999–2003	256	65	99	164	60	—	—	—	—	—	
Dwyer, Gordie	Canada	LW	2002–2003	17	0	1	1	50	—	—	—	—	—	
Dyck, Henry	United States	C/LW	1943–1944	1	0	0	0	0	—	—	—	—	—	
Eakins, Dallas	United States	D	1996–1997	3	0	0	0	6	—	—	—	—	—	
Eastwood, Mike	Canada	C	1996–1998	75	6	12	18	26	15	1	2	3	22	
Eddolls, Frank	Canada	D	1947–1952	260	18	34	52	88	13	0	1	1	4	
Edstrom, Adam*	Sweden	C	2023–2026	97	10	6	16	31	—	—	—	—	—	
Egan, Pat	Canada	D	1949–1951	140	10	21	31	120	12	3	1	4	6	
Egers, Jack	Canada	RW	1969–1972; 1973–1974	111	13	14	27	72	16	4	1	5	16	
Eminger, Steve	Canada	D	2010–2013	142	4	10	14	58	15	0	2	2	4	
Eriksson, Anders	Sweden	D	2009–2010	8	0	2	2	0	—	—	—	—	—	
Erixon, Jan	Sweden	LW	1983–1993	556	57	159	216	167	58	7	7	14	16	
Errey, Bob	Canada	LW	1997–1998	12	0	0	0	7	—	—	—	—	—	
Esposito, Phil†	Canada	C	1975–1981	422	184	220	404	263	30	11	16	27	33	HHoF 1984
Evans, Jack	Canada	D	1948–1958	407	15	38	53	670	16	1	1	2	39	
Ezinicki, Bill	Canada	RW	1954–1955	16	2	2	4	22	—	—	—	—	—	
Fahey, Trevor	Canada	LW	1964–1965	1	0	0	0	0	—	—	—	—	—	
Fairbairn, Bill	Canada	RW	1968–1977	536	138	224	362	161	52	13	21	34	42	
Farrish, Dave	Canada	D	1976–1979	217	6	41	47	225	10	0	2	2	14	
Fast, Jesper	Sweden	RW	2013–2020	422	55	92	147	116	40	6	8	14	2	
Fata, Rico	Canada	RW	2001–2003	46	2	4	6	6	—	—	—	—	—	
Featherstone, Glen	Canada	D	1994–1995	6	1	0	1	18	—	—	—	—	—	
Fedorov, Fedor	Russia	C	2005–2006	3	0	0	0	6	—	—	—	—	—	
Fedotenko, Ruslan	Ukraine	LW	2010–2012	139	19	26	45	41	25	2	7	9	12	
Fedyk, Brent	Canada	LW	1998–1999	67	4	6	10	30	—	—	—	—	—	
Feltrin, Tony	Canada	D	1985–1986	10	0	0	0	21	—	—	—	—	—	
Fenton, Paul	United States	LW	1986–1987	8	0	0	0	2	—	—	—	—	—	
Ferraro, Chris	United States	C	1995–1997	14	2	1	3	6	—	—	—	—	—	
Ferraro, Peter	United States	LW	1995–1998	8	0	1	1	2	2	0	0	0	0	
Ferraro, Ray	Canada	C	1995–1996	65	25	29	54	82	—	—	—	—	—	
Finley, Jeff	Canada	D	1997–1999	65	1	6	7	55	—	—	—	—	—	
Fiorentino, Peter	Canada	D	1991–1992	1	0	0	0	0	—	—	—	—	—	
Fisher, Dunc	Canada	RW	1948–1951	142	21	37	58	82	13	3	4	7	14	
Fitzpatrick, Alex	Canada	C	1964–1965	4	0	0	0	2	—	—	—	—	—	
Flatley, Patrick	Canada	RW	1996–1997	68	10	12	22	26	11	0	0	0	14	
Fleming, Reg	Canada	D/LW	1965–1969	241	50	49	99	540	13	0	4	4	22	
Fleury, Theoren	Canada	RW	1999–2002	224	69	132	201	406	—	—	—	—	—	
Fogarty, Steven	United States	C	2017–2020	18	0	0	0	2	1	0	0	0	0	
Foley, Gerry	United States	RW	1956–1958	137	9	14	23	91	9	0	1	1	2	
Fonteyne, Val	Canada	LW	1963–1965	96	7	19	26	6	—	—	—	—	—	
Fontinato, Lou	Canada	D	1954–1961	418	22	57	79	939	15	0	1	1	19	
Forbes, Colin	Canada	C	2000–2001	19	1	4	5	15	—	—	—	—	—	
Fortescue, Drew*	United States	D	2025–2026	9	0	2	2	4	—	—	—	—	—	
Foster, Harry	Canada	D	1929–1930	31	0	0	0	10	—	—	—	—	—	
Foster, Herb	Canada	LW	1940–1941; 1947–1948	6	1	0	1	5	—	—	—	—	—	
Fotiu, Nick	United States	LW	1976–1979; 1980–1985	455	41	62	103	970	24	0	3	3	27	
Fox, Adam*	United States	D	2019–2026	486	72	350	422	194	46	5	34	39	28	
Fraser, Archie	Canada	C	1943–1944	3	0	1	1	0	—	—	—	—	—	
Fraser, Scott	Canada	C	1998–1999	28	2	4	6	14	—	—	—	—	—	
Frolov, Alexander	Russia	LW	2010–2011	43	7	9	16	8	—	—	—	—	—	
Ftorek, Robbie	United States	C	1981–1985	170	32	55	87	122	14	8	4	12	11	
Gaborik, Marian	Slovakia	RW	2009–2013	255	114	115	229	97	25	6	7	13	4	
Gadsby, Bill†	Canada	D	1954–1961	457	58	213	271	413	16	2	8	10	10	HHoF 1970
Gagner, Dave	Canada	C	1984–1986	80	11	16	27	47	—	—	—	—	—	
Gainor, Norman	Canada	C	1931–1932	46	3	9	12	9	7	0	0	0	0	
Galanov, Maxim	Russia	D	1997–1998	6	0	1	1	2	—	—	—	—	—	
Gardner, Cal	Canada	C	1945–1948	126	28	36	64	103	5	0	0	0	0	
Garrett, Dudley	Canada	D	1942–1943	23	1	1	2	18	—	—	—	—	—	
Gartner, Mike†	Canada	RW	1989–1994	322	173	113	286	231	29	14	12	26	16	HHoF 2001
Gauthier, Fern	Canada	RW	1943–1944	33	14	10	24	0	—	—	—	—	—	
Gavrikov, Vladislav*	Russia	D	2025–2026	82	14	21	35	50	—	—	—	—	—	
Gauthier, Julien	Canada	RW	2019–2023	131	11	15	26	28	3	0	0	0	0	
Gendron, Jean-Guy	Canada	LW	1955–1958; 1960–1961	272	38	41	79	217	16	3	2	5	19	
Geoffrion, Bernie†	Canada	RW	1966–1968	117	22	41	63	53	5	2	1	3	0	HHoF 1972
Gernander, Ken	United States	RW	1995–1996; 2003–2004	12	2	3	5	6	15	0	0	0	0	
Gettinger, Timothy	United States	LW	2018–2022	16	0	1	1	0	—	—	—	—	—	
Gilbert, Greg†	Canada	LW	1993–1994	76	4	11	15	29	23	1	3	4	8	SC 1994
Gilbert, Rod†	Canada	RW	1960–1978	1,065	406	615	1,021	508	79	34	33	67	43	HHoF 1982
Giles, Curt	Canada	D	1986–1988	74	2	17	19	60	5	0	0	0	6	
Gilhen, Randy	Canada	C	1991–1993	73	10	9	19	22	13	1	2	3	2	
Gillis, Jere	United States	LW	1980–1982	61	13	19	32	20	14	2	5	7	9	
Gilmour, John	Canada	D	2017–2019	33	2	3	5	18	—	—	—	—	—	
Gilroy, Matt	United States	D	2009–2011; 2012–2013	142	7	19	26	43	5	1	0	1	2	
Girardi, Dan	Canada	D	2006–2017	788	46	184	230	275	122	6	27	33	36	
Giroux, Alexandre	Canada	C/LW	2005–2006	1	0	0	0	0	—	—	—	—	—	
Glass, Tanner	Canada	LW	2014–2017	134	6	9	15	181	30	1	4	5	42	
Glover, Howie	Canada	RW	1963–1964	25	1	0	1	9	—	—	—	—	—	
Goegan, Pete	Canada	D	1961–1962	7	0	2	2	6	—	—	—	—	—	
Goldsworthy, Bill	Canada	RW	1976–1978	68	10	13	23	55	—	—	—	—	—	
Goldsworthy, Leroy	United States	RW	1929–1930	44	4	1	5	16	5	0	0	0	2	
Goldup, Hank	Canada	LW	1942–1946	103	34	46	80	69	—	—	—	—	—	
Gomez, Scott	United States	C	2007–2009	158	32	96	128	96	17	6	10	16	12	
Goneau, Daniel	Canada	LW	1996–2000	53	12	3	15	14	—	—	—	—	—	
Gooden, Billy	Canada	LW	1942–1944	53	9	11	20	15	—	—	—	—	—	
Goodrow, Barclay	Canada	RW	2021–2024	241	28	48	76	205	32	7	3	10	47	
Gordon, Jack	Canada	C	1948–1951	36	3	10	13	0	9	1	1	2	7	
Gosselin, Ben	Canada	LW	1977–1978	7	0	0	0	33	—	—	—	—	—	
Goyette, Phil	Canada	C	1963–1969; 1971–1972	397	98	231	329	51	26	2	4	6	6	
Grabner, Michael	Austria	RW	2016–2018	135	52	19	71	22	12	4	2	6	0	
Grachev, Evgeny	Russia	C	2010–2011	8	0	0	0	0	—	—	—	—	—	
Granato, Tony	United States	RW	1988–1990	115	43	45	88	217	4	1	1	2	21	
Gratton, Norm	Canada	LW	1971–1972	3	0	1	1	0	—	—	—	—	—	
Graves, Adam†	Canada	LW	1991–2001	772	280	227	507	810	68	28	16	44	70	SC 1994
Gray, Alex†	Canada	RW	1927–1928	43	7	0	7	30	9	1	0	1	0	SC 1928
Greco, Anthony	United States	RW	2021–2022	1	0	0	0	0	—	—	—	—	—	
Green, Josh	Canada	LW	2002–2003; 2003–2004	18	3	2	5	10	—	—	—	—	—	
Green, Mike	Canada	C	2003–2004	13	1	2	3	2	—	—	—	—	—	
Greschner, Ron	Canada	D	1974–1990	982	179	431	610	1,226	84	17	32	49	106	
Gretzky, Wayne†	Canada	C	1996–1999	234	57	192	249	70	15	10	10	20	2	HHoF 1999
Gronstrand, Jari	Finland	D	1987–1988	62	3	11	14	63	—	—	—	—	—	
Grosek, Michal	Czech Republic	LW	2000–2002	80	12	13	25	73	—	—	—	—	—	
Guevremont, Jocelyn	Canada	D	1979–1980	20	2	5	7	6	—	—	—	—	—	
Guidolin, Aldo	Canada	RW/D	1952–1956	182	9	15	24	117	—	—	—	—	—	
Gusarov, Alexei	Russia	D	2000–2001	26	1	3	4	6	—	—	—	—	—	
Gustafsson, Erik	Sweden	D	2023–2024	76	6	25	31	35	16	0	3	3	8	
Hadfield, Vic	Canada	LW	1961–1974	839	262	310	572	1,036	61	22	21	43	106	
Hagelin, Carl	Sweden	LW	2011–2015	266	58	72	130	132	73	12	14	26	39	
Hajek, Libor	Czech Republic	D	2018–2023	110	4	8	12	40	—	—	—	—	—	
Haley, Micheal	Canada	C	2019–2020	22	1	0	1	50	—	—	—	—	—	
Hall, Adam	United States	RW	2006–2007	49	4	8	12	18	—	—	—	—	—	
Hall, Wayne	Canada	LW	1960–1961	4	0	0	0	0	—	—	—	—	—	
Halpern, Jeff	United States	C	2012–2013	30	0	1	1	8	—	—	—	—	—	
Hamilton, Al	Canada	D	1965–1970	81	0	5	5	62	6	0	0	0	2	
Hammond, Ken	Canada	D	1988–1989	3	0	0	0	0	—	—	—	—	—	
Hampson, Ted	Canada	C	1960–1963	183	14	40	54	16	6	0	1	1	0	
Hanna, John	Canada	D	1958–1961	177	6	26	32	204	—	—	—	—	—	
Hannigan, Pat	Canada	LW	1960–1962	109	19	23	42	58	4	0	0	0	2	
Hardy, Mark	Switzerland	D	1987–1988; 1988–1993	284	7	52	59	409	26	0	6	6	94	
Harpur, Ben	Canada	D	2022–2023	42	1	5	6	20	—	—	—	—	—	
Harris, Ron	Canada	D	1972–1976	146	6	30	36	64	24	4	3	7	25	
Harrison, Ed	Canada	C/LW	1950–1951	4	1	0	1	2	—	—	—	—	—	
Hartman, Mike	United States	LW	1992–1995	39	1	1	2	80	—	—	—	—	—	
Harvey, Doug†	Canada	D	1961–1964	151	10	61	71	144	6	0	1	1	2	HHoF 1973
Harvey, Todd	Canada	RW/C	1998–2000	68	14	20	34	134	—	—	—	—	—	
Hatcher, Kevin	United States	D	1999–2000	74	4	19	23	38	—	—	—	—	—	
Hayes, Kevin	United States	C	2014–2019	361	87	129	216	98	34	2	8	10	10	
Healey, Paul	Canada	LW	2003–2004	4	0	0	0	0	—	—	—	—	—	
Heaslip, Mark	United States	RW	1976–1978	48	6	10	16	65	3	0	0	0	0	
Heath, Randy	Canada	LW	1984–1986	13	2	4	6	15	—	—	—	—	—	
Hebenton, Andy	Canada	RW	1955–1963	560	177	191	368	75	22	6	5	11	8	
Hedberg, Anders	Sweden	RW	1978–1985	465	172	225	397	144	42	35	28	63	30	
Heikkinen, Ilkka	Finland	D	2009–2010	7	0	0	0	0	—	—	—	—	—	
Heindl, Bill	Canada	LW	1972–1973	4	1	0	1	0	—	—	—	—	—	
Heisten, Barrett	United States	LW	2001–2002	10	0	0	0	2	—	—	—	—	—	
Heller, Ott†	Canada	D	1931–1946	647	55	176	231	465	61	6	8	14	61	SC 1933, 1940
Helminen, Raimo	Finland	C	1985–1987	87	12	34	46	12	2	0	0	0	0	
Henry, Camille	Canada	C	1953–1965; 1967–1968	637	256	222	478	78	17	3	7	10	5	
Hergesheimer, Wally	Canada	RW	1951–1956; 1958–1959	310	112	77	189	94	5	1	0	1	0	
Heximer, Orville	Canada	LW/C	1929–1930	19	1	0	1	4	—	—	—	—	—	
Hextall, Bryan†	Canada	RW	1936–1948	449	187	175	362	227	37	8	9	17	19	SC 1940; HHoF 1969
Hextall, Dennis	Canada	LW	1968–1969	13	1	4	5	25	2	0	0	0	0	
Hicke, Bill	Canada	RW	1964–1967	137	18	33	51	58	—	—	—	—	—	
Hickey, Greg	Canada	LW	1977–1978	1	0	0	0	0	—	—	—	—	—	
Hickey, Pat	Canada	LW	1975–1980; 1981–1982	370	128	129	257	216	21	3	7	10	6	
Higgins, Christopher	United States	LW	2009–2010	55	6	8	14	32	—	—	—	—	—	
Hildebrand, Ike	Canada	RW	1953–1954	31	6	7	13	12	—	—	—	—	—	
Hiller, Jim	Canada	RW	1993–1994	2	0	0	0	7	—	—	—	—	—	
Hiller, Wilbert†	Canada	LW	1937–1941; 1943–1944	198	49	70	119	116	23	3	4	7	11	SC 1940
Hillman, Wayne	Canada	D	1964–1968	219	6	41	47	185	6	0	0	0	2	
Hlavac, Jan	Czech Republic	LW	1999–2001; 2003–2004	218	52	80	132	52	—	—	—	—	—	
Hodge, Ken	Canada	RW	1976–1978	96	23	45	68	51	—	—	—	—	—	
Holden, Nick	Canada	D	2016–2018	135	14	32	46	49	11	2	2	4	4	
Holik, Bobby	Czech Republic	C	2002–2004	146	41	50	91	148	—	—	—	—	—	
Holland, Jerry	Canada	LW	1974–1976	37	8	4	12	6	—	—	—	—	—	
Holland, Peter	Canada	C	2017–2018	23	1	3	4	7	—	—	—	—	—	
Hollweg, Ryan	United States	LW	2005–2008	200	5	7	12	311	14	0	1	1	23	
Holst, Greg	Canada	C	1975–1978	11	0	0	0	0	—	—	—	—	—	
Horava, Miloslav	Czechoslovakia	D	1988–1991	80	5	17	22	38	2	0	1	1	0	
Horton, Tim†	Canada	D	1969–1971	93	3	23	26	73	19	2	5	7	42	HHoF 1977
Horvath, Bronco	Canada	C	1955–1957; 1962–1963	114	20	34	54	78	5	1	2	3	4	
Hospodar, Ed	United States	D	1979–1982	122	8	23	31	442	19	3	0	3	135	
Hossa, Marcel	Slovakia	LW	2005–2008	164	21	21	42	78	14	2	2	4	10	
Howden, Brett	Canada	C	2018–2021	178	16	33	49	53	3	0	0	0	4	
Howe, Vic	Canada	RW	1950–1955	33	3	4	7	10	—	—	—	—	—	
Howell, Harry†	Canada	D	1952–1969	1,160	82	263	345	1,147	34	3	2	5	30	HHoF 1979
Howell, Ron	Canada	D/LW	1954–1956	4	0	0	0	0	—	—	—	—	—	
Hrivik, Marek	Slovakia	LW	2015–2017	21	0	3	3	2	—	—	—	—	—	
Huber, Willie	Canada	D	1983–1988	238	28	58	86	282	28	5	5	10	33	
Hudson, Mike	Canada	C/LW	1993–1994	48	4	7	11	47	—	—	—	—	—	
Hughes, John	Canada	D	1980–1981	—	—	—	—	—	3	0	1	1	6	
Hull, Jody	Canada	RW	1990–1992	50	5	8	13	12	—	—	—	—	—	
Hunt, Dryden	Canada	LW	2021–2023	79	7	11	18	54	3	0	0	0	0	
Hunt, Fred	Canada	RW	1944–1945	44	13	9	22	6	—	—	—	—	—	
Hunwick, Matt	United States	D	2014–2015	55	2	9	11	16	6	0	0	0	0	
Huras, Larry	Canada	D	1976–1977	2	0	0	0	0	—	—	—	—	—	
Hurlbut, Mike	United States	D	1992–1993	23	1	8	9	16	—	—	—	—	—	
Hutchinson, Ron	Canada	C	1960–1961	9	0	0	0	0	—	—	—	—	—	
Immonen, Jarmo	Finland	C	2005–2007	20	3	5	8	4	—	—	—	—	—	
Iorio, Vincent*	Canada	D	2025–2026	6	0	0	0	0	—	—	—	—	—	
Irvine, Ted	Canada	LW	1969–1975	378	86	91	177	438	60	10	18	28	103	
Irwin, Ivan	United States	D	1953–1958	151	2	26	28	214	5	0	0	0	0	
Isbister, Brad	Canada	D	2006–2007	19	1	4	5	14	4	0	0	0	2	
Jackson, Don	United States	D	1986–1987	22	1	0	1	91	—	—	—	—	—	
Jackson, Jeff	Canada	LW	1986–1987	9	5	1	6	15	6	1	1	2	16	
Jagr, Jaromir	Czech Republic	RW	2003–2008	277	124	195	319	220	23	10	17	27	26	
Jamieson, James	Canada	D	1943–1944	1	0	1	1	0	—	—	—	—	—	
Janssens, Mark	Canada	C	1987–1992	157	14	15	29	338	15	5	1	6	16	
Jarrett, Doug	Canada	D	1975–1977	54	0	4	4	23	—	—	—	—	—	
Jarry, Pierre	Canada	LW	1971–1972	34	3	3	6	20	—	—	—	—	—	
Jeffrey, Larry	Canada	LW	1967–1969	122	3	10	13	27	7	0	0	0	2	
Jensen, Chris	Canada	RW	1985–1988	53	7	11	18	23	—	—	—	—	—	
Jensen, Nicklas	Denmark	LW	2016–2017	7	0	0	0	0	—	—	—	—	—	
Jerwa, Joe	Canada	D	1930–1931	33	4	7	11	72	4	0	0	0	4	
Johansson, Andreas	Sweden	C	2001–2002	70	14	10	24	46	—	—	—	—	—	
Johns, Don	Canada	D	1960–1965	148	2	21	23	70	—	—	—	—	—	
Johnson, Ivan†	Canada	D	1926–1937	405	38	48	86	798	55	5	2	7	159	SC 1928, 1933; HHoF 1958
Johnson, Jack	United States	D	2020–2021	13	1	0	1	8	—	—	—	—	—	
Johnson, Jim	Canada	C	1964–1967	8	1	0	1	0	—	—	—	—	—	
Johnsson, Kim	Sweden	D	1999–2001	151	11	36	47	86	—	—	—	—	—	
Johnstone, Ed	Canada	RW	1975–1983	371	109	125	234	319	53	13	10	23	83	
Jokinen, Olli	Finland	C	2009–2010	26	4	11	15	22	—	—	—	—	—	
Jones, Bob	Canada	LW	1968–1969	2	0	0	0	0	—	—	—	—	—	
Jones, Zac	United States	D	2020–2025	115	4	24	28	38	—	—	—	—	—	
Jooris, Josh	Canada	C	2016–2017	12	1	1	2	6	—	—	—	—	—	
Juckes, Bing	Canada	LW	1947–1950	16	2	1	3	6	—	—	—	—	—	
Juzda, Bill	Canada	D	1940–1948	187	11	25	36	178	12	0	1	1	13	
Kabel, Robert	Canada	C	1959–1961	48	5	13	18	34	—	—	—	—	—	
Kakko, Kaapo	Finland	RW	2019–2025	330	61	70	131	80	44	4	5	9	2	
Kaleta, Alex	Canada	LW	1948–1951	181	32	37	69	84	10	0	3	3	0	
Kalinin, Dmitri	Russia	D	2008–2009	58	1	12	13	26	—	—	—	—	—	
Kaliyev, Arthur	United States	RW	2024–2025	14	3	1	4	2	—	—	—	—	—	
Kamensky, Valeri	Russia	LW	1999–2001	123	27	39	66	60	—	—	—	—	—	
Kampfer, Steven	United States	D	2016–2018	32	1	2	3	22	—	—	—	—	—	
Kane, Patrick	United States	RW	2022–2023	19	5	7	12	6	7	1	5	6	6	
Kannegiesser, Sheldon	Canada	D	1972–1974	15	1	4	5	10	1	0	0	0	2	
Karpa, Dave	Canada	D	2001–2003	94	1	12	13	145	—	—	—	—	—	
Karpovtsev, Alexander†	Russia	D	1993–1999	280	22	75	97	211	44	2	8	10	36	SC 1994
Kartye, Tye*	Canada	F	2025–2026	24	5	9	14	17	—	—	—	—	—	
Kasparaitis, Darius	Lithuania	D	2002–2007	215	6	28	34	260	2	0	0	0	0	
Keane, Mike	Canada	RW	1997–1998	70	8	10	18	47	—	—	—	—	—	
Keating, Mike	Canada	LW	1977–1978	1	0	0	0	0	—	—	—	—	—	
Keeling, Melville†	Canada	LW	1928–1938	452	136	55	191	250	47	11	11	22	34	SC 1933
Keller, Ralph	Canada	D	1962–1963	3	1	0	1	6	—	—	—	—	—	
Kenady, Chris	United States	RW	1999–2000	2	0	0	0	0	—	—	—	—	—	
Kennedy, Dean	Canada	D	1988–1989	16	0	1	1	40	—	—	—	—	—	
Kenny, Ernie	Canada	D	1930–1935	6	0	0	0	0	—	—	—	—	—	
Kerr, Tim	Canada	C/RW	1991–1992	32	7	11	18	12	8	1	0	1	0	
King, Kris	Canada	LW	1989–1993	249	27	33	60	731	29	6	2	8	88	
King, Steven	United States	RW	1992–1993	24	7	5	12	16	—	—	—	—	—	
Kirk, Bobby	Canada	RW	1937–1938	39	4	8	12	14	—	—	—	—	—	
Kirkpatrick, Bob	Canada	C	1942–1943	49	12	12	24	6	—	—	—	—	—	
Kisio, Kelly	Canada	C	1986–1991	336	110	195	305	415	18	2	9	11	19	
Klein, Kevin	Canada	D	2013–2017	224	22	50	72	75	20	0	6	6	9	
Kleinendorst, Scot	United States	D	1982–1984	53	2	11	13	43	6	0	2	2	2	
Kloucek, Tomas	Czech Republic	D	2000–2002	95	2	7	9	211	—	—	—	—	—	
Knuble, Mike	Canada	RW	1998–2000	141	24	25	49	44	—	—	—	—	—	
Kocur, Joey	Canada	RW	1990–1996	278	14	15	29	537	48	2	4	6	84	
Kondratiev, Maxim	Russia	D	2005–2006	29	1	2	3	22	—	—	—	—	—	
Kontos, Chris	Canada	LW	1982–1985	78	12	16	28	65	—	—	—	—	—	
Korney, Mike	Canada	RW	1978–1979	18	0	1	1	18	—	—	—	—	—	
Korpikoski, Lauri	Finland	LW	2007–2009	68	6	8	14	14	8	1	2	3	0	
Kotalik, Ales	Czech Republic	RW	2009–2010	45	8	14	22	38	—	—	—	—	—	
Kotanen, Dick	Canada	D	1950–1951	1	0	0	0	0	—	—	—	—	—	
Kotsopoulos, Chris	Canada	D	1980–1981	54	4	12	16	153	14	0	3	3	63	
Kovalev, Alexei†	Russia	RW	1992–1999; 2002–2003	492	142	188	330	533	44	16	23	39	42	SC 1994
Kraftcheck, Steve	Canada	D	1951–1953	127	10	18	28	75	—	—	—	—	—	
Kravtsov, Vitali	Russia	RW	2020–2023	48	5	5	10	10	—	—	—	—	—	
Kreider, Chris	United States	LW	2012–2025	883	326	256	582	575	123	48	28	76	84	
Krog, Jason	Canada	C	2006–2007	9	2	0	2	4	—	—	—	—	—	
Krol, Joe	Canada	LW	1936–1939	2	1	1	2	0	—	—	—	—	—	
Krulicki, Jim	Canada	LW	1970–1971	27	0	2	2	6	—	—	—	—	—	
Kukulowicz, Aggie	Canada	C	1952–1954	4	1	0	1	0	—	—	—	—	—	
Kulak, Stu	Canada	RW	1986–1987	3	0	0	0	0	3	0	0	0	2	
Kullman, Ed	Canada	RW	1947–1954	343	56	70	126	298	6	1	0	1	2	
Kuntz, Alan	Canada	LW	1941–1946	45	10	12	22	12	6	1	0	1	2	
Kurri, Jari†	Finland	RW	1995–1996	14	1	4	5	2	11	3	5	8	2	HHoF 2001
Kurtenbach, Orland	Canada	C	1966–1970	198	30	61	91	191	15	2	4	6	50	
Kwong, Larry	Canada	RW	1947–1948	1	0	0	0	0	—	—	—	—	—	
Kyle, Bill	Canada	C	1949–1951	3	0	3	3	0	—	—	—	—	—	
Kyle, Walter	Canada	D	1949–1951	134	5	8	13	235	12	1	2	3	30	
Kypreos, Nick†	Canada	LW	1993–1996	128	7	12	19	272	3	0	0	0	2	SC 1994
Laba, Noah*	United States	C	2025–2026	74	9	15	24	31	—	—	—	—	—	
Labadie, Mike	Canada	RW	1952–1953	3	0	0	0	0	—	—	—	—	—	
Labossiere, Gord	Canada	C	1963–1965	16	0	0	0	12	—	—	—	—	—	
Labovitch, Max	Canada	RW	1943–1944	5	0	0	0	4	—	—	—	—	—	
Labrie, Guy	Canada	D	1944–1945	27	2	2	4	14	—	—	—	—	—	
LaCouture, Dan	United States	LW	2002–2004	83	6	6	12	82	—	—	—	—	—	
Lacroix, Daniel	Canada	LW	1993–1994; 1994–1996	30	2	2	4	30	—	—	—	—	—	
Lacroix, Eric	Canada	LW	1998–2001	146	8	12	20	67	—	—	—	—	—	
LaFayette, Nathan	Canada	C	1994–1996	17	0	0	0	2	—	—	—	—	—	
Lafleur, Guy†	Canada	RW	1988–1989	67	18	27	45	12	4	1	0	1	0	HHoF 1988
LaFontaine, Pat†	United States	C	1997–1998	67	23	39	62	36	—	—	—	—	—	HHoF 2003
Lafreniere, Alexis*	Canada	LW	2020–2026	462	116	134	250	176	43	10	13	23	17	
Lafreniere, Jason	Canada	C	1988–1989	38	8	16	24	6	3	0	0	0	17	
Laidlaw, Tom	Canada	D	1980–1987	510	20	99	119	561	48	2	8	10	66	
Lambert, Lane	Canada	RW	1986–1987	18	2	2	4	33	—	—	—	—	—	
Lamirande, Jean	Canada	LW/D	1946–1950; 1954–1955	48	5	5	10	26	8	0	0	0	4	
Lampman, Bryce	United States	D	2003–2007	10	0	0	0	2	—	—	—	—	—	
Lancien, Jack	Canada	D	1946–1951	63	1	5	6	35	6	0	1	1	2	
Lane, Myles	United States	D	1928–1929	24	1	0	1	22	—	—	—	—	—	
Langdon, Darren	Canada	LW	1994–2000	277	14	15	29	735	12	0	0	0	2	
Langlois, Albert	Canada	D	1961–1964	173	13	34	47	184	6	0	1	1	2	
Laperriere, Ian	Canada	RW	1995–1996	28	1	2	3	53	—	—	—	—	—	
Laprade, Edgar†	Canada	C	1945–1955	500	108	172	280	0	18	4	9	13	4	HHoF 1993
Larmer, Steve†	Canada	RW	1993–1995	115	35	54	89	57	33	11	9	20	20	SC 1994
Larose, Claude	Canada	LW	1979–1980	25	4	7	11	2	2	0	0	0	0	
Larose, Cory	Canada	C	2003–2004	7	0	1	1	4	—	—	—	—	—	
Larouche, Pierre	Canada	C	1983–1988	253	123	120	243	59	27	14	12	26	8	
Larouche, Steve	Canada	C	1995–1996	1	0	0	0	0	—	—	—	—	—	
Larson, Norm	Canada	RW	1946–1947	1	0	0	0	0	—	—	—	—	—	
Latos, James	Canada	RW	1988–1989	1	0	0	0	0	—	—	—	—	—	
Latreille, Phil	Canada	C/RW	1960–1961	4	0	0	0	2	—	—	—	—	—	
Laviolette, Peter	United States	D	1988–1989	12	0	0	0	6	—	—	—	—	—	
Lawton, Brian	United States	LW	1988–1989	30	7	10	17	39	—	—	—	—	—	
Laycoe, Hal	Canada	D	1945–1947	75	1	14	15	31	—	—	—	—	—	
Leavins, Jim	Canada	D	1986–1987	4	0	1	1	4	—	—	—	—	—	
LeBrun, Al	Canada	D	1960–1961; 1965–1966	6	0	2	2	4	—	—	—	—	—	
Leduc, Albert	Canada	D	1933–1934	10	0	0	0	6	—	—	—	—	—	
Ledyard, Grant	Canada	D	1984–1986	69	10	21	31	73	3	0	2	2	4	
Leetch, Brian†	United States	D	1987–2004	1,129	240	741	981	525	82	28	61	89	30	SC 1994; HHoF 2009
Lefebvre, Sylvain	Canada	D	1999–2003	229	4	30	34	131	—	—	—	—	—	
Leger, Roger	Canada	D	1943–1944	7	1	2	3	2	—	—	—	—	—	
Legge, Randy	Canada	D	1972–1973	12	0	2	2	2	—	—	—	—	—	
Leinonen, Mikko	Finland	C	1981–1984	159	31	77	108	69	19	2	11	13	28	
Lemieux, Brendan	Canada	LW	2018–2021	109	11	20	31	214	1	0	0	0	0	
Lemieux, Real	Canada	LW	1969–1970; 1973–1974	62	4	6	10	51	—	—	—	—	—	
Leschyshyn, Jake	Canada	C	2022–2024	14	0	0	0	0	—	—	—	—	—	
Leswick, Tony	Canada	LW/RW	1945–1951	368	113	89	202	420	18	5	6	11	20	
Lettieri, Vinni	United States	C	2017–2019	46	2	6	8	14	—	—	—	—	—	
Levandoski, Joe	Canada	RW	1946–1947	8	1	1	2	0	—	—	—	—	—	
Levinsky, Alex	United States	D	1934–1935	20	0	4	4	6	—	—	—	—	—	
Lewicki, Danny	Canada	LW	1954–1958	280	76	90	166	107	16	0	4	4	8	
Lewis, Dale	Canada	LW	1975–1976	8	0	0	0	0	—	—	—	—	—	
Liba, Igor	Czechoslovakia	LW	1988–1989	10	2	5	7	15	—	—	—	—	—	
Lidster, Doug	Canada	D	1993–1994; 1995–1998	177	8	19	27	131	31	4	5	9	24	
Liffiton, David	Canada	D	2005–2007	3	0	0	0	9	—	—	—	—	—	
Lindberg, Oscar	Sweden	C	2014–2017	134	21	27	48	75	14	3	1	4	4	
Lindbom, Johan	Sweden	LW	1997–1998	38	1	3	4	28	—	—	—	—	—	
Lindgren, Ryan	United States	D	2018–2025	387	12	87	99	255	43	3	8	11	22	
Lindros, Eric	Canada	C	2001–2004	192	66	92	158	339	—	—	—	—	—	
Lintner, Richard	Slovakia	D	2002–2003	10	1	0	1	0	—	—	—	—	—	
Lisin, Enver	Russia	RW	2009–2010	57	6	8	14	18	—	—	—	—	—	
Lochead, Bill	Canada	LW	1979–1980	7	0	0	0	4	—	—	—	—	—	
Locke, Corey	Canada	C	2009–2010	3	0	0	0	0	—	—	—	—	—	
Loney, Troy	Canada	LW	1994–1995	4	0	0	0	0	1	0	0	0	0	
Lorentz, Jim	Canada	C/RW	1971–1972	7	0	0	0	0	—	—	—	—	—	
Lowe, Kevin†	Canada	D	1992–1996	217	10	38	48	262	42	1	5	6	36	SC 1994
Lowe, Norman	Canada	C	1949–1950	4	1	1	2	0	—	—	—	—	—	
Luce, Don	Canada	C	1969–1971	21	1	3	4	8	5	0	1	1	4	
Lund, Pentti	Finland	RW	1948–1951	182	36	41	77	38	12	6	5	11	0	
Lundkvist, Nils	Sweden	D	2021–2022	25	1	3	4	0	—	—	—	—	—	
Lundmark, Jamie	Canada	C	2002–2006	114	11	19	30	55	—	—	—	—	—	
Lyashenko, Roman	Russia	C	2001–2003	17	2	0	2	0	—	—	—	—	—	
MacDonald, James†	Canada	LW	1939–1945	151	36	34	70	47	15	1	2	3	4	SC 1940
MacDonald, Jason	Canada	RW	2003–2004	4	0	0	0	19	—	—	—	—	—	
MacDonald, Parker	Canada	C	1956–1960	119	15	18	33	54	7	2	3	5	2	
Macey, Hubert	Canada	LW	1941–1943	18	6	8	14	0	1	0	0	0	0	
MacGregor, Bruce	Canada	C	1970–1974	220	62	73	135	44	52	10	14	24	10	
MacIntosh, Ian	Canada	RW	1952–1953	4	0	0	0	4	—	—	—	—	—	
Maciver, Norm	Canada	D	1986–1989	66	9	26	35	28	—	—	—	—	—	
MacKenzie, Bill	Canada	D	1934–1935	15	1	0	1	10	3	0	0	0	0	
Mackey, Connor*	United States	D	2023–2026	6	0	0	0	14	—	—	—	—	—	
Mackey, Reg	Canada	D	1926–1927	34	0	0	0	16	1	0	0	0	0	
MacLean, John	Canada	RW	1998–2001	161	46	51	97	98	—	—	—	—	—	
MacLellan, Brian	Canada	LW	1985–1986	51	11	21	32	47	16	2	4	6	15	
MacMillan, Bob	Canada	RW	1974–1975	22	1	2	3	4	—	—	—	—	—	
MacNeil, Al	Canada	D	1966–1967	58	0	4	4	44	4	0	0	0	2	
MacTavish, Craig†	Canada	C	1993–1994	12	4	2	6	11	23	1	4	5	22	SC 1994
Mahaffey, Johnny	Canada	C	1943–1944	28	9	20	29	0	—	—	—	—	—	
Malakhov, Vladimir	Russia	D	2000–2004	211	12	53	65	192	—	—	—	—	—	
Malhotra, Manny	Canada	C	1998–2002	206	19	22	41	90	—	—	—	—	—	
Malik, Marek	Czech Republic	D	2005–2008	185	6	43	49	196	14	1	4	5	16	
Mallette, Troy	Canada	LW	1989–1991	150	25	26	51	557	15	2	2	4	99	
Maloney, Dave	Canada	D	1974–1985	605	70	225	295	1,113	48	7	17	24	91	
Maloney, Don	Canada	LW	1978–1989	653	195	307	502	739	85	22	35	57	91	
Mancini, Victor	United States	D	2024–2025	15	1	4	5	2	—	—	—	—	—	
Mancuso, Felix	Canada	RW	1942–1943	21	6	8	14	13	—	—	—	—	—	
Maneluk, Mike	Canada	LW	1998–1999	4	0	0	0	4	—	—	—	—	—	
Mann, Jack	Canada	C	1943–1945	9	3	4	7	0	—	—	—	—	—	
Manson, Ray	Canada	LW	1948–1949	1	0	1	1	0	—	—	—	—	—	
Mara, Paul	United States	D	2006–2009	156	8	35	43	164	27	3	4	7	46	
Maracle, Henry	Canada	LW	1930–1931	11	1	3	4	4	4	0	0	0	0	
Marchant, Todd	United States	C	1993–1994	1	0	0	0	0	—	—	—	—	—	
Marcinyshyn, Dave	Canada	D	1992–1993	2	0	0	0	2	—	—	—	—	—	
Markham, Ray	Canada	C	1979–1980	14	1	1	2	21	7	1	0	1	24	
Marois, Mario	Canada	D	1977–1981	166	15	52	67	356	28	0	8	8	42	
Marotte, Gilles	Canada	D	1973–1976	180	10	66	76	131	15	0	2	2	10	
Marshall, Bert	Canada	D	1972–1973	8	0	0	0	14	6	0	1	1	8	
Marshall, Don	Canada	LW	1963–1970	479	129	141	270	40	15	3	2	5	2	
Martin, Clare	Canada	D	1951–1952	14	0	1	1	6	—	—	—	—	—	
Mason, Charlie	Canada	RW	1934–1936	74	6	14	20	44	4	0	1	1	0	
Matteau, Stephane†	Canada	LW	1993–1996	85	11	10	21	49	32	6	4	10	8	SC 1994
Maxwell, Brad	Canada	D	1986–1987	9	0	4	4	6	—	—	—	—	—	
Mayer, Jim	Canada	RW	1979–1980	4	0	0	0	0	—	—	—	—	—	
McAdam, Sammy	Canada	C/LW	1930–1931	5	0	0	0	0	—	—	—	—	—	
McAllister, Chris	Canada	D	2003–2004	12	0	1	1	12	—	—	—	—	—	
McCallum, Dunc	Canada	D	1965–1966	2	0	0	0	2	—	—	—	—	—	
McCarthy, Dan	Canada	C	1980–1981	5	4	0	4	4	—	—	—	—	—	
McCarthy, Sandy	Canada	RW	2000–2003; 2003–2004	258	28	32	60	425	—	—	—	—	—	
McClanahan, Rob	United States	C	1981–1984	141	33	43	76	77	19	4	10	14	14	
McCosh, Shawn	Canada	C	1994–1995	5	1	0	1	2	—	—	—	—	—	
McCreary Sr., Bill	Canada	LW	1953–1955	10	0	2	2	2	—	—	—	—	—	
McDonagh, Bill	Canada	LW	1949–1950	4	0	0	0	2	—	—	—	—	—	
McDonagh, Ryan	United States	D	2010–2018	516	51	187	238	221	96	10	31	41	49	
McDonald, John	Canada	RW	1943–1944	43	10	9	19	6	—	—	—	—	—	
McDonald, Wilfred	Canada	D	1943–1945	81	7	15	22	14	—	—	—	—	—	
McDonald, Robert	Canada	RW	1943–1944	1	0	0	0	0	—	—	—	—	—	
McDougall, Mike	United States	RW	1979–1981	3	0	0	0	0	—	—	—	—	—	
McEwen, Mike	Canada	D	1976–1980; 1985–1986	242	42	92	134	141	18	2	11	13	8	
McGregor, Donald	Canada	RW	1963–1964	2	0	0	0	2	—	—	—	—	—	
McIlrath, Dylan	Canada	D	2013–2017	38	2	2	4	84	1	0	0	0	0	
McIntyre, John	Canada	C	1992–1993	11	1	0	1	4	—	—	—	—	—	
McKegg, Greg	Canada	C	2019–2020; 2021–2022	96	7	7	14	23	3	0	0	0	2	
McKegney, Tony	Canada	LW	1986–1987	64	29	17	46	56	6	0	0	0	12	
McKenna, Steve	Canada	LW	2001–2002	54	2	1	3	144	—	—	—	—	—	
McKenney, Don	Canada	C	1962–1964	39	9	20	29	4	—	—	—	—	—	
McKenzie, John	Canada	RW	1965–1966	35	6	5	11	36	—	—	—	—	—	
McLeod, Cody	Canada	LW	2017–2019	56	1	2	3	99	—	—	—	—	—	
McLeod, Jackie	Canada	RW	1949–1955	106	14	23	37	12	7	0	0	0	0	
McMahon, Mike	Canada	D	1963–1966; 1971–1972	61	0	13	13	50	—	—	—	—	—	
McPhee, George	Canada	LW	1983–1987	109	21	24	45	247	29	5	3	8	69	
McQuaid, Adam	Canada	D	2018–2019	36	2	3	5	33	—	—	—	—	—	
McReynolds, Brian	Canada	C	1990–1991	1	0	0	0	0	—	—	—	—	—	
McSorley, Marty	Canada	D	1995–1996	9	0	2	2	21	4	0	0	0	0	
Megna, Jayson	United States	C	2015–2016	6	1	1	2	2	—	—	—	—	—	
Meissner, Dick	Canada	RW	1963–1965	36	3	5	8	0	—	—	—	—	—	
Melnyk, Larry	Canada	D	1985–1988	133	4	21	25	281	22	1	2	3	50	
Mertzig, Jan	Sweden	D	1998–1999	23	0	2	2	8	—	—	—	—	—	
Messier, Joby	Canada	D	1992–1995	25	0	4	4	24	—	—	—	—	—	
Messier, Mark†	Canada	LW/C	1991–1997; 2000–2004	698	250	441	691	667	70	29	51	80	69	SC 1994; HHoF 2007
Mickey, Larry	Canada	RW	1965–1968	19	0	2	2	2	—	—	—	—	—	
Mickoski, Nick	Canada	LW	1948–1955	362	88	93	181	129	14	1	6	7	2	
Middleton, Rick	Canada	RW	1974–1976	124	46	44	90	33	3	0	0	0	2	
Mikkola, Niko	Finland	D	2022–2023	31	1	2	3	23	7	0	2	2	12	
Mikol, Jim	Canada	LW/D	1964–1965	30	1	3	4	6	—	—	—	—	—	
Milks, Hib	Canada	LW/C	1931–1932	48	0	4	4	12	7	0	0	0	0	
Millen, Corey	United States	C	1989–1992	19	4	5	9	12	6	1	2	3	0	
Miller, J. T.*	United States	C	2012–2018; 2024–2026	441	102	158	260	195	40	1	15	16	29	
Miller, K'Andre	United States	D	2020–2025	368	36	96	132	162	43	3	9	12	22	
Miller, Kelly	United States	LW	1984–1987	117	19	36	55	76	19	3	4	7	6	
Miller, Kevin	United States	C	1988–1991	103	20	37	57	67	1	0	0	0	0	
Miller, Warren	United States	C	1979–1980	55	7	6	13	17	6	1	0	1	0	
Mironov, Boris	Russia	D	2002–2004	111	6	22	28	120	—	—	—	—	—	
Moe, Bill	United States	D	1944–1949	261	11	42	53	163	1	0	0	0	0	
Mohns, Lloyd	Canada	D	1943–1944	1	0	0	0	0	—	—	—	—	—	
Moller, Randy	Canada	D	1989–1992	164	7	38	45	378	16	1	8	9	43	
Molyneaux, Larry	Canada	D	1937–1939	45	0	1	1	20	10	0	0	0	8	
Momesso, Sergio	Canada	LW	1995–1997	28	4	4	8	41	11	3	1	4	14	
Monahan, Hartland	Canada	RW	1974–1975	6	0	1	1	4	—	—	—	—	—	
Moore, Dominic	Canada	C	2003–2006; 2013–2016	322	31	50	81	106	53	5	7	12	44	
Moore, John	United States	D	2012–2015	125	6	21	27	49	33	0	3	3	18	
Moore, Greg	United States	RW	2007–2008	6	0	0	0	0	—	—	—	—	—	
More, Jayson	Canada	D	1988–1989; 1996–1997	15	0	1	1	25	—	—	—	—	—	
Morenz, Howie†	Canada	C	1935–1936	19	2	4	6	6	—	—	—	—	—	HHoF 1945
Morris, Elwyn	Canada	D	1948–1949	18	0	1	1	8	—	—	—	—	—	
Morrison, Jim	Canada	D	1960–1961	19	1	6	7	6	—	—	—	—	—	
Morrison, Mark	Canada	C	1981–1983	10	1	1	2	0	—	—	—	—	—	
Morrow, Scott*	United States	D	2025–2026	29	0	6	6	4	—	—	—	—	—	
Mottau, Mike	United States	D	2000–2002	19	0	3	3	13	—	—	—	—	—	
Motte, Tyler	Canada	C	2021–2023	33	5	5	10	2	22	2	0	2	16	
Mullen, Brian	United States	RW	1987–1991	307	100	148	248	188	18	2	5	7	12	
Murdoch, Don	Canada	RW	1976–1980	221	97	93	190	110	21	8	8	16	16	
Murdoch, Murray†	Canada	LW	1926–1937	508	84	108	192	197	55	9	12	21	28	SC 1928, 1933
Murphy, Mike	Canada	RW	1972–1974	31	6	5	11	5	10	0	0	0	0	
Murphy, Ron	Canada	LW	1952–1957	207	41	60	101	141	10	0	1	1	2	
Murray, Garth	Canada	C	2003–2004	20	1	0	1	24	—	—	—	—	—	
Murray, Rem	Canada	C/LW	2001–2003	43	7	8	15	8	—	—	—	—	—	
Myles, Vic	Canada	D	1942–1943	45	6	9	15	57	—	—	—	—	—	
Namestnikov, Vladislav	Russia	C	2017–2020	99	13	22	35	56	—	—	—	—	—	
Nash, Rick	Canada	LW	2012–2018	375	145	107	252	178	77	15	26	41	22	
Nash, Riley	Canada	C	2023–2024	1	0	0	0	0	—	—	—	—	—	
Naslund, Markus	Sweden	LW	2008–2009	82	24	22	46	57	7	1	2	3	10	
Ndur, Rumun	Canada	D	1998–1999	31	1	3	4	46	—	—	—	—	—	
Neckar, Stan	Czech Republic	D	1998–1999	18	0	0	0	8	—	—	—	—	—	
Nedomansky, Vaclav	Czechoslovakia	RW	1982–1983	35	12	8	20	0	—	—	—	—	—	
Nedved, Petr	Czech Republic	C	1994–1995; 1998–2004	478	149	202	351	312	10	3	2	5	6	
Neilson, Jim	Canada	D	1962–1974	810	60	238	298	766	65	1	17	18	61	
Nemchinov, Sergei†	Soviet Union; Russia	LW	1991–1997	418	105	120	225	151	52	7	15	22	18	SC 1994
Nemeth, Patrik	Sweden	D	2021–2022	63	2	5	7	28	5	0	0	0	8	
Nemeth, Steve	Canada	C	1987–1988	12	2	0	2	2	—	—	—	—	—	
Nethery, Lance	Canada	C	1980–1982	38	11	12	23	12	14	5	3	8	9	
Nevin, Bob	Canada	RW	1963–1971	505	168	174	342	105	33	6	12	18	8	
Newman, Dan	Canada	LW	1976–1978	100	14	21	35	59	3	0	0	0	0	
Nicholls, Bernie	Canada	C	1989–1992	104	37	73	110	116	15	11	8	19	24	
Nicolson, Graeme	Canada	D	1982–1983	10	0	0	0	9	—	—	—	—	—	
Nielsen, Jeff	United States	RW	1996–1997	2	0	0	0	2	—	—	—	—	—	
Nieminen, Ville	Finland	LW	2005–2006	48	5	12	17	53	—	—	—	—	—	
Nieves, Cristoval	United States	C	2016–2020	76	5	14	19	24	—	—	—	—	—	
Nilan, Chris	United States	RW	1987–1990	85	11	14	25	332	8	0	2	2	57	
Nilsson, Ulf	Sweden	C	1978–1983	170	57	112	169	85	25	8	14	22	27	
Noonan, Brian†	United States	RW	1993–1995; 1996–1997	101	24	24	48	66	27	4	7	11	25	SC 1994
Norstrom, Mattias	Sweden	D	1993–1996	43	2	6	8	30	3	0	0	0	0	
Nycholat, Lawrence	Canada	D	2003–2004	9	0	0	0	6	—	—	—	—	—	
Nylander, Michael	Sweden	C	2005–2007	160	49	113	162	118	14	6	8	14	0	
O'Connor, Buddy†	Canada	C	1947–1951	238	62	102	164	12	—	—	—	—	—	HHoF 1988
O'Gara, Rob	United States	D	2017–2018	22	0	3	3	6	—	—	—	—	—	
Oatman, Russell	Canada	LW	1928–1929	27	1	1	2	10	4	0	0	0	0	
Ogrodnick, John	Canada	LW	1987–1992	338	126	128	254	106	20	8	3	11	0	
Olczyk, Ed†	United States	C	1992–1995	103	18	22	40	58	1	0	0	0	0	SC 1994
Oliver, David	Canada	RW	1996–1997	14	2	1	3	4	3	0	0	0	0	
Oliwa, Krzysztof	Poland	LW	2002–2003	9	0	0	0	51	—	—	—	—	—	
Orr, Colton	Canada	RW	2005–2009	224	4	7	11	522	12	0	0	0	30	
Ortmeyer, Jed	United States	C	2003–2007	177	9	15	24	76	13	1	0	1	6	
Osborne, Mark	Canada	LW	1983–1987; 1994–1995	253	61	74	135	321	30	3	4	7	39	
Othmann, Brennan*	Canada	LW	2023–2026	42	1	2	3	13	—	—	—	—	—	
Ozolinsh, Sandis	Latvia	D	2005–2007	40	3	14	17	28	—	—	—	—	—	
Paiement, Wilf	Canada	RW	1985–1986	8	1	6	7	13	16	5	5	10	45	
Paille, Daniel	Canada	LW	2015–2016	12	0	0	0	0	—	—	—	—	—	
Palazzari, Aldo	United States	RW	1943–1944	11	2	0	2	0	—	—	—	—	—	
Panarin, Artemi*	Russia	LW	2019–2026	482	205	402	607	134	46	12	23	35	14	
Parenteau, P. A.	Canada	LW	2009–2010	22	3	5	8	4	—	—	—	—	—	
Park, Brad†	Canada	D	1968–1976	465	95	283	378	738	64	12	28	40	129	HHoF 1988
Parssinen, Juuso*	Finland	C	2024–2026	31	4	4	8	21	—	—	—	—	—	
Paterson, Joe	Canada	LW	1987–1989	41	1	4	5	147	—	—	—	—	—	
Patey, Larry	Canada	C	1983–1985	16	1	3	4	16	5	0	1	1	6	
Patrick, James	Canada	D	1983–1994	671	104	363	467	541	63	5	26	31	62	
Patrick, Lester†	Canada	D	1926–1927	1	0	0	0	2	1	0	0	0	0	HHoF 1947; SC 1928
Patrick, Lynn†	Canada	C/LW	1934–1946	455	145	190	335	240	44	10	6	16	22	HHoF 1980; SC 1940
Patrick, Murray†	Canada	D	1937–1946	166	5	26	31	133	25	4	0	4	34	SC 1940
Patrick, Steve	Canada	RW	1984–1986	71	15	21	36	100	1	0	0	0	0	
Pavelich, Mark	United States	C	1981–1986	341	133	185	318	326	23	7	17	24	14	
Pavese, Jim	United States	D	1987–1988	14	0	1	1	48	—	—	—	—	—	
Pearson, Mel	Canada	LW	1959–1965	36	2	5	7	25	—	—	—	—	—	
Perreault, Fern	Canada	LW	1947–1950	3	0	0	0	0	—	—	—	—	—	
Perreault, Gabriel*	Canada	RW	2024–2026	54	12	15	27	10	—	—	—	—	—	
Peters, Frank	United States	D	1930–1931	43	0	0	0	59	4	0	0	0	2	
Peters, Garry	Canada	C	1965–1966	63	7	3	10	42	—	—	—	—	—	
Petit, Michel	Canada	D	1987–1989	133	17	49	66	377	4	0	2	2	27	
Petrovicky, Ronald	Slovakia	RW	2002–2003	66	5	9	14	77	—	—	—	—	—	
Pettinger, Gordon†	Canada	C	1932–1933	34	1	2	3	18	8	0	0	0	0	SC 1933
Pichette, Dave	Canada	D	1987–1988	6	1	3	4	4	—	—	—	—	—	
Pike, Alfred†	Canada	LW/C	1939–1947	234	42	77	119	145	21	4	2	6	12	SC 1940
Pilon, Rich	Canada	D	1999–2001	114	2	13	15	211	—	—	—	—	—	
Pionk, Neal	United States	D	2017–2019	101	7	33	40	47	—	—	—	—	—	
Pirri, Brandon	Canada	LW	2016–2017	60	8	10	18	25	—	—	—	—	—	
Pisa, Ales	Czech Republic	D	2002–2003	3	0	0	0	0	—	—	—	—	—	
Pitlick, Tyler	United States	C	2023–2024	34	1	3	4	4	—	—	—	—	—	
Plager, Bob	Canada	D	1964–1967	29	0	5	5	40	—	—	—	—	—	
Plante, Pierre	Canada	RW	1978–1979	70	6	25	31	37	18	0	6	6	20	
Pock, Thomas	Austria	D	2003–2008	59	7	7	14	20	4	0	3	3	4	
Poddubny, Walt	Canada	LW	1986–1988	152	78	97	175	125	6	0	0	0	8	
Poeschek, Rudy	Canada	RW/D	1987–1990	68	0	2	2	256	—	—	—	—	—	
Poile, Bud†	Canada	RW	1949–1950	27	3	6	9	8	—	—	—	—	—	HHoF 1990
Polich, John	United States	RW	1939–1941	3	0	1	1	0	—	—	—	—	—	
Polis, Greg	Canada	LW	1974–1979	275	65	76	141	196	3	0	0	0	6	
Popein, Larry	Canada	C	1954–1961	402	75	127	202	150	16	1	4	5	6	
Popovic, Peter	Sweden	D	1998–1999	68	1	4	5	40	—	—	—	—	—	
Poti, Tom	United States	D	2001–2006	231	25	78	103	177	4	0	0	0	2	
Potter, Corey	United States	D	2008–2010	8	1	1	2	2	—	—	—	—	—	
Pouliot, Benoit	Canada	LW	2013–2014	80	15	21	36	56	25	5	5	10	26	
Pratt, Babe†	Canada	D	1935–1943	305	27	97	124	289	39	9	8	17	70	HHoF 1966; SC 1940
Prentice, Dean	Canada	LW	1952–1963	666	186	236	422	263	19	2	7	9	10	
Presley, Wayne	United States	RW	1995–1996	61	4	6	10	71	—	—	—	—	—	
Price, Noel	Canada	D	1959–1961	7	0	0	0	4	—	—	—	—	—	
Price, Pat	Canada	D	1986–1987	13	0	2	2	49	6	0	1	1	27	
Pronger, Sean	Canada	C	1998–1999	14	0	3	3	4	—	—	—	—	—	
Prospal, Vaclav	Czech Republic	C	2009–2011	104	29	52	81	40	5	1	0	1	0	
Prucha, Petr	Czech Republic	RW	2005–2009	237	63	50	113	100	17	1	1	2	4	
Prust, Brandon	Canada	LW	2009–2012	190	22	33	55	381	24	1	2	3	35	
Puempel, Matt	Canada	LW	2016–2017	27	6	3	9	4	—	—	—	—	—	
Purinton, Dale	United States	D	1999–2004	181	4	16	20	578	—	—	—	—	—	
Pushor, Jamie	Canada	D	2003–2004	7	0	0	0	0	—	—	—	—	—	
Pusie, Jean	Canada	D	1933–1934	19	0	2	2	17	—	—	—	—	—	
Quenneville, Leo	Canada	LW/C	1929–1930	25	0	3	3	10	3	0	0	0	0	
Quintal, Stephane	Canada	D	1999–2000	75	2	14	16	77	—	—	—	—	—	
Rachunek, Karel	Czech Republic	D	2003–2007	78	7	23	30	42	6	0	4	4	2	
Raddysh, Taylor*	Canada	RW	2025–2026	68	9	10	19	12	—	—	—	—	—	
Raleigh, Don	Canada	C	1943–1956	535	101	219	320	96	18	6	5	11	6	
Ratelle, Jean†	Canada	C	1960–1976	862	336	481	817	192	65	9	28	37	14	HHoF 1985
Read, Melvin	Canada	C	1946–1947	1	0	0	0	0	—	—	—	—	—	
Reaves, Ryan	Canada	RW	2021–2023	81	5	8	13	55	18	0	0	0	12	
Redden, Wade	Canada	D	2008–2010	156	5	35	40	78	7	0	2	2	0	
Regan, Bill	Canada	D	1929–1933	67	3	2	5	67	8	0	0	0	2	
Reinnika, Ollie	Canada	C/RW	1926–1927	16	0	0	0	0	—	—	—	—	—	
Reise, Leo	Canada	D	1929–1930	14	0	1	1	8	4	0	0	0	16	
Reise, Jr., Leo	Canada	D	1952–1954	131	7	20	27	124	—	—	—	—	—	
Rempe, Matt*	Canada	C	2023–2026	85	5	6	11	149	11	1	0	1	10	
Reunanen, Tarmo	Finland	D	2020–2021	4	0	1	1	0	—	—	—	—	—	
Rheaume, Pascal	Canada	C	2003–2004	17	0	0	0	5	—	—	—	—	—	
Rice, Steven	Canada	RW	1990–1991	11	1	1	2	4	2	2	1	3	6	
Richards, Brad	Canada	C	2011–2014	210	56	95	151	54	55	12	16	28	14	
Richards, Justin	United States	F	2020–2021	1	0	1	1	0	—	—	—	—	—	
Richardson, Dave	Canada	LW	1963–1965	41	3	2	5	25	—	—	—	—	—	
Richmond, Steve	United States	D	1983–1986	77	2	12	14	263	4	0	0	0	12	
Richter, Barry	United States	D	1995–1996	4	0	1	1	0	—	—	—	—	—	
Ridley, Mike	Canada	C	1985–1987	118	38	63	101	89	16	6	8	14	26	
Ripley, Vic	Canada	LW	1933–1935	38	5	14	19	10	2	1	0	1	4	
Ritson, Alex	Canada	C	1944–1945	1	0	0	0	0	—	—	—	—	—	
Rivers, Wayne	Canada	RW	1968–1969	4	0	0	0	0	—	—	—	—	—	
Robertson, Matthew*	Canada	D	2024–2026	74	6	12	18	38	—	—	—	—	—	
Robertsson, Bert	Sweden	D	2000–2001	2	0	0	0	4	—	—	—	—	—	
Robinson, Doug	Canada	LW	1964–1967	73	16	26	42	10	—	—	—	—	—	
Robitaille, Luc†	Canada	LW	1995–1997	146	47	70	117	128	26	5	12	17	12	HHoF 2009
Robitaille, Mike	Canada	D	1969–1971	15	1	1	2	15	—	—	—	—	—	
Rochefort, Leon	Canada	RW	1960–1963	24	5	4	9	6	—	—	—	—	—	
Rochefort, Normand	Canada	D	1988–1992	112	7	15	22	108	10	2	1	3	26	
Rodden, Eddie	Canada	C	1930–1931	24	0	3	3	8	—	—	—	—	—	
Rogers, Mike	Canada	C	1981–1986	316	117	191	308	142	14	1	10	11	6	
Rolfe, Dale	Canada	D	1970–1975	244	13	66	79	250	50	5	17	22	59	
Ronson, Len	Canada	LW	1960–1961	13	2	1	3	10	—	—	—	—	—	
Ronty, Paul	Canada	C	1951–1955	260	45	113	158	62	—	—	—	—	—	
Rooney, Kevin	United States	C	2020–2022	115	14	12	26	72	15	0	2	2	10	
Roslovic, Jack	United States	C	2023–2024	19	3	5	8	2	16	2	6	8	6	
Ross, Jim	Canada	D	1951–1953	62	2	11	13	29	—	—	—	—	—	
Rousseau, Bobby	Canada	RW	1971–1975	236	41	116	157	30	38	9	22	31	15	
Rowe, Ronnie	Canada	C/LW	1947–1948	5	1	0	1	0	—	—	—	—	—	
Roy, Jean-Yves	Canada	RW	1994–1995	3	1	0	1	2	—	—	—	—	—	
Rozsival, Michal	Czech Republic	D	2005–2011	432	42	134	176	374	31	4	10	14	32	
Rucchin, Steve	Canada	C	2005–2006	72	13	23	36	10	4	1	0	1	0	
Rucinsky, Martin	Czech Republic	LW	2001–2002; 2003–2004; 2005–2006	136	32	78	110	124	2	0	1	1	2	
Ruff, Lindy	Canada	D	1988–1991	83	3	12	15	138	10	0	3	3	29	
Ruhwedel, Chad	United States	D	2023–2025	10	0	1	1	0	—	—	—	—	—	
Ruotsalainen, Reijo	Finland	D	1981–1986	389	99	217	316	154	43	11	16	27	22	
Rupp, Duane	Canada	D	1962–1963	2	0	0	0	0	—	—	—	—	—	
Rupp, Mike	United States	LW	2011–2013	68	4	1	5	109	20	0	0	0	36	
Russell, Church	Canada	LW/C	1945–1948	90	20	16	36	12	—	—	—	—	—	
Saarinen, Simo	Finland	D	1984–1985	8	0	0	0	0	—	—	—	—	—	
Sacharuk, Larry	Canada	D	1972–1974; 1975–1977	75	9	11	20	18	—	—	—	—	—	
Samuelsson, Kjell	Sweden	D	1985–1987	39	2	6	8	60	9	0	1	1	8	
Samuelsson, Mikael	Sweden	RW	2001–2003	125	14	24	38	55	—	—	—	—	—	
Samuelsson, Ulf	Sweden	D	1995–1999	287	14	46	60	475	26	1	7	8	46	
Sands, Charlie	Canada	C/RW	1943–1944	9	0	2	2	0	—	—	—	—	—	
Sanderson, Derek	Canada	C	1974–1976	83	25	25	50	110	3	0	0	0	0	
Sandstrom, Tomas	Sweden	RW	1984–1990	407	173	207	380	563	29	8	12	20	52	
Sanguinetti, Bobby	United States	D	2009–2010	5	0	0	0	4	—	—	—	—	—	
Sather, Glen†	Canada	LW	1970–1974	186	18	24	42	193	38	0	2	2	47	HHoF 2013
Sauer, Michael	United States	D	2008–2012	98	4	14	18	96	5	0	1	1	0	
Savard, Marc	Canada	C	1997–1999	98	10	41	51	42	—	—	—	—	—	
Scanlin, Brandon	Canada	D	2023–2024	1	0	0	0	0	—	—	—	—	—	
Scherza, Chuck	Canada	LW/C	1943–1945	27	5	5	10	29	—	—	—	—	—	
Schinkel, Ken	Canada	RW	1959–1967	265	34	55	89	77	6	1	1	2	0	
Schneider, Braden*	Canada	D	2021–2026	368	20	67	87	85	43	1	5	6	31	
Schneider, Mathieu	United States	D	1998–2000	155	20	44	64	149	—	—	—	—	—	
Scott, Laurie	Canada	LW/C	1927–1928	23	0	1	1	6	—	—	—	—	—	
Scott, Richard	Canada	LW	2001–2004	10	0	0	0	28	—	—	—	—	—	
Seibert, Earl†	Canada	D	1931–1936	204	27	41	68	338	21	2	2	4	38	HHoF 1963; SC 1933
Seiling, Rod	Canada	D	1963–1975	644	50	198	248	423	54	4	7	11	28	
Senick, George	Canada	LW	1952–1953	13	2	3	5	8	—	—	—	—	—	
Sevigny, Pierre	Canada	LW	1997–1998	3	0	0	0	2	—	—	—	—	—	
Shack, Eddie	Canada	LW	1958–1961	141	16	26	42	236	—	—	—	—	—	
Shack, Joe	Canada	LW	1942–1945	70	9	27	36	20	—	—	—	—	—	
Shanahan, Brendan†	Canada	LW	2006–2008	140	52	56	108	82	20	6	6	12	20	HHoF 2013
Shattenkirk, Kevin	United States	D	2017–2019	119	7	44	51	64	—	—	—	—	—	
Shaw, David	Canada	D	1987–1992	240	17	57	74	314	10	0	2	2	41	
Sheary, Conor*	United States	LW	2025–2026	62	7	11	18	14	—	—	—	—	—	
Sheehan, Bobby	United States	C	1978–1979	—	—	—	—	—	15	4	3	7	8	
Shelley, Jody	Canada	LW	2009–2010	21	2	4	6	37	—	—	—	—	—	
Shibicky, Alex†	Canada	RW	1935–1946	324	110	91	201	161	39	12	12	24	12	SC 1940
Siebert, Albert Babe†	Canada	LW/D	1932–1934	56	9	11	20	56	8	1	0	1	12	SC 1933; HHoF 1964
Siklenka, Mike	Canada	RW	2003–2004	1	0	0	0	0	—	—	—	—	—	
Silk, Dave	United States	RW	1979–1983	141	30	33	63	112	9	2	4	6	4	
Siltala, Mike	Canada	RW	1986–1988	4	0	0	0	0	—	—	—	—	—	
Simon, Chris	Canada	LW	2003–2004	65	14	9	23	225	—	—	—	—	—	
Sinclair, Reggie	Canada	RW/C	1950–1952	139	38	31	69	103	—	—	—	—	—	
Sjostrom, Fredrik	Sweden	RW	2007–2009	97	9	6	15	38	17	0	2	2	2	
Skjei, Brady	United States	D	2015–2020	307	25	87	112	170	17	4	3	7	12	
Skrudland, Brian	Canada	C	1997–1998	59	5	6	11	39	—	—	—	—	—	
Slowinski, Ed	Canada	RW	1947–1953	291	58	74	132	63	16	2	6	8	6	
Smith, Brendan	Canada	D	2016–2021	235	14	29	43	313	15	0	4	4	24	
Smith, Clint†	Canada	C	1936–1943	281	80	115	195	12	29	4	5	9	2	SC 1940; HHoF 1991
Smith, Dallas	Canada	D	1977–1978	29	1	4	5	23	1	0	1	1	0	
Smith, Don	Canada	LW/C	1949–1950	11	1	1	2	0	1	0	0	0	0	
Smith, Floyd	Canada	RW	1960–1961	29	5	9	14	0	—	—	—	—	—	
Smith, Geoff	Canada	D	1997–1999	19	1	1	2	8	—	—	—	—	—	
Smith, Reilly	Canada	RW	2024–2025	58	10	19	29	22	—	—	—	—	—	
Smith, Stanford†	Canada	C	1939–1941	9	2	1	3	0	1	0	0	0	0	SC 1940
Smrek, Peter	Slovakia	D	2000–2002	22	0	4	4	16	—	—	—	—	—	
Smyth, Brad	Canada	RW	1997–1998; 2000–2001	5	1	0	1	0	—	—	—	—	—	
Somers, Art†	Canada	C	1932–1935	145	19	37	56	82	19	1	5	6	18	SC 1933
Sonmor, Glen	Canada	LW	1953–1955	28	2	0	2	21	—	—	—	—	—	
Soucy, Carson*	Canada	D	2024–2026	62	4	7	11	22	—	—	—	—	—	
Spencer, Irv	Canada	D	1959–1962	131	4	20	24	81	1	0	0	0	2	
Spooner, Ryan	Canada	C	2017–2019	36	5	13	18	2	—	—	—	—	—	
Sproul, Ryan	Canada	D	2017–2018	16	1	4	5	6	—	—	—	—	—	
Staal, Eric	Canada	C	2015–2016	20	3	3	6	2	5	0	0	0	4	
Staal, Marc	Canada	D	2007–2020	892	43	145	188	432	107	7	13	20	42	
Stalberg, Viktor	Sweden	RW	2015–2016	75	9	11	20	22	5	0	0	0	6	
Staley, Al	Canada	C	1948–1949	1	0	1	1	0	—	—	—	—	—	
Stanley, Allan†	Canada	D	1948–1955	307	23	55	78	272	12	2	5	7	10	HHoF 1981
Stanowski, Wally	Canada	D	1948–1951	146	3	14	17	54	—	—	—	—	—	
Starr, Harold	Canada	D	1934–1936	49	1	1	2	43	4	0	0	0	2	
Stefanski, Bud	Canada	C	1977–1978	1	0	0	0	0	—	—	—	—	—	
Stemkowski, Pete	Canada	C	1970–1977	496	113	204	317	379	55	18	18	32	75	
Stepan, Derek	United States	C	2010–2017	515	128	232	360	130	97	19	30	49	24	
Sterner, Ulf	Sweden	LW	1964–1965	4	0	0	0	0	—	—	—	—	—	
Stevens, Kevin	United States	LW	1997–2000	199	40	52	92	237	—	—	—	—	—	
Stewart, Gaye	Canada	LW	1951–1953	87	16	26	42	30	—	—	—	—	—	
Stewart, Ron	Canada	RW	1967–1971; 1971–1973	306	44	37	81	74	37	4	3	7	4	
Stock, P. J.	Canada	C	1997–2000	54	2	4	6	131	—	—	—	—	—	
Stoddard, Jack	Canada	RW	1951–1953	80	16	15	31	31	—	—	—	—	—	
Stoughton, Blaine	Canada	RW	1983–1984	14	5	2	7	4	—	—	—	—	—	
Strain, Neil	Canada	LW/C	1952–1953	52	11	13	24	12	—	—	—	—	—	
Straka, Martin	Czech Republic	C	2005–2008	224	65	122	187	88	24	5	15	20	20	
Stralman, Anton	Sweden	D	2011–2014	182	7	31	38	62	55	3	8	11	8	
Stratton, Art	Canada	C/LW	1959–1960	18	2	5	7	2	—	—	—	—	—	
Strobel, Art	Canada	LW	1943–1944	7	0	0	0	0	—	—	—	—	—	
Strome, Ryan	Canada	C	2018–2022	263	71	124	195	206	22	2	9	11	17	
Strudwick, Jason	Canada	RW	2005–2008	125	4	5	9	108	5	0	0	0	0	
Summers, Chris	United States	D	2014–2016	6	0	0	0	4	—	—	—	—	—	
Sundin, Ronnie	Sweden	D	1997–1998	1	0	0	0	0	—	—	—	—	—	
Sundstrom, Niklas	Sweden	LW	1995–1999	315	65	98	163	78	20	4	8	12	6	
Sundstrom, Peter	Sweden	LW	1983–1986	206	48	62	110	70	9	1	3	4	2	
Sweeney, Bill	Canada	C	1959–1960	4	1	0	1	0	—	—	—	—	—	
Sweeney, Tim	United States	LW	1997–1998	56	11	18	29	26	—	—	—	—	—	
Sullivan, George	Canada	C	1956–1961	322	59	150	209	300	6	1	2	3	4	
Sykora, Adam*	Slovakia	LW	2025–2026	11	3	1	4	5	—	—	—	—	—	
Sykora, Petr	Czech Republic	RW	2005–2006	40	16	15	31	22	4	0	0	0	0	
Taffe, Jeff	United States	C	2005–2006	2	0	0	0	0	—	—	—	—	—	
Talafous, Dean	United States	RW	1978–1982	202	42	60	102	91	19	4	7	11	11	
Talakoski, Ron	Canada	RW	1986–1988	9	0	1	1	33	—	—	—	—	—	
Tamer, Chris	United States	D	1998–1999	52	1	5	6	92	—	—	—	—	—	
Tarasenko, Vladimir	Russia	RW	2022–2023	31	8	13	21	0	7	3	1	4	2	
Tatchell, Spence	Canada	D	1942–1943	1	0	0	0	0	—	—	—	—	—	
Taylor, Billy	Canada	C	1947–1948	2	0	0	0	0	—	—	—	—	—	
Taylor, Billy	Canada	C	1964–1965	2	0	0	0	0	—	—	—	—	—	
Taylor, Ralph	Canada	D	1929–1930	22	2	0	2	32	4	0	0	0	10	
Taylor, Ted	Canada	LW	1964–1966	8	0	1	1	6	—	—	—	—	—	
Taylor, Tim	Canada	C	1999–2001	114	11	16	27	88	—	—	—	—	—	
Thompson, Paul†	Canada	LW	1926–1931	217	35	33	68	144	24	3	2	5	40	
Thurier, Fred	Canada	C	1944–1945	50	16	19	35	14	—	—	—	—	—	
Tibbetts, Billy	United States	RW	2002–2003	11	0	0	0	12	—	—	—	—	—	
Tikkanen, Esa†	Finland	LW	1992–1994; 1998–1999	144	25	42	67	176	38	13	7	20	60	SC 1994
Tinordi, Jarred	United States	D	2021–2022	7	1	0	1	7	—	—	—	—	—	
Tinordi, Mark	Canada	D	1987–1988	24	1	2	3	50	—	—	—	—	—	
Tkaczuk, Walt	Canada	C	1967–1981	945	227	451	678	556	93	19	32	51	119	
Toms, Jeff	Canada	C	2000–2002	53	8	5	13	10	—	—	—	—	—	
Toppazzini, Zellio	Canada	RW	1950–1952	71	15	15	30	31	—	—	—	—	—	
Trainor, Wes	Canada	C/LW	1948–1949	17	1	2	3	6	—	—	—	—	—	
Tripp, John	Canada	RW	2002–2003	9	1	2	3	2	—	—	—	—	—	
Trocheck, Vincent*	United States	C	2022–2026	313	89	164	253	221	23	9	12	21	24	
Trottier, Guy	Canada	RW	1968–1969	2	0	0	0	0	—	—	—	—	—	
Trouba, Jacob	United States	D	2019–2025	364	31	105	136	329	46	2	11	13	53	
Turcotte, Darren	United States	C	1988–1994	325	122	133	255	183	25	6	8	14	10	
Trudell, Rene	Canada	RW	1945–1948	129	24	28	52	72	5	0	0	0	2	
Tustin, Norman	Canada	LW	1941–1942	18	2	4	6	0	—	—	—	—	—	
Tuzzolino, Tony	United States	RW	2000–2001	6	0	0	0	5	—	—	—	—	—	
Tyutin, Fedor	Russia	D	2003–2008	250	15	51	66	159	24	0	9	9	12	
Ulanov, Igor	Russia	D	2001–2002	39	0	6	6	53	—	—	—	—	—	
Ulmer, Jeff	Canada	D	2001–2002	21	3	0	3	8	—	—	—	—	—	
Ulmer, Layne	Canada	C	2003–2004	1	0	0	0	0	—	—	—	—	—	
Vaakanainen, Urho*	Finland	D	2024–2026	80	2	19	21	30	—	—	—	—	—	
Vadnais, Carol	Canada	D	1975–1982	485	56	190	246	690	54	5	16	21	65	
Vail, Melville	Canada	D/LW	1928–1930	50	4	1	5	18	10	0	0	0	2	
VandenBussche, Ryan	Canada	RW	1996–1998	27	2	0	2	68	—	—	—	—	—	
Vasiliev, Alexei	Russia	D	1997–1998	1	0	0	0	2	—	—	—	—	—	
Vatrano, Frank	United States	LW	2021–2022	22	8	5	13	6	20	5	8	13	13	
Verbeek, Pat	Canada	RW	1994–1996	88	51	46	97	147	21	7	12	19	32	
Vesey, Jimmy	United States	LW	2016–2019; 2022–2025	434	78	69	147	107	31	2	7	9	21	
Vial, Dennis	Canada	D/LW	1990–1991	21	0	0	0	61	—	—	—	—	—	
Vickers, Steve	Canada	LW	1972–1982	698	246	340	586	330	68	24	25	49	58	
Virtue, Terry	Canada	D	1999–2000	1	0	0	0	0	—	—	—	—	—	
Vorobiev, Vladimir	Russia	LW	1996–1998	31	7	7	14	12	—	—	—	—	—	
Voros, Aaron	Canada	C	2008–2010	95	11	12	23	211	4	0	0	0	0	
Voss, Carl†	United States	C	1932–1933	10	2	1	3	4	—	—	—	—	—	HHoF 1974
Waite, Frank	Canada	C	1930–1931	17	1	3	4	4	—	—	—	—	—	
Walker, Gordie	Canada	RW	1986–1988	19	2	4	6	21	—	—	—	—	—	
Wallin, Peter	Sweden	RW	1980–1982	52	3	14	17	14	14	2	6	8	6	
Ward, Aaron	Canada	D	2006–2007	60	3	10	13	57	—	—	—	—	—	
Ward, Dixon	Canada	RW	2002–2003	8	0	0	0	2	—	—	—	—	—	
Ward, Jason	Canada	RW	2005–2007	127	14	24	38	70	1	0	0	0	2	
Wares, Eddie	Canada	D/RW	1936–1937	2	2	0	2	0	—	—	—	—	—	
Warwick, Bill	Canada	LW	1942–1944	14	3	3	6	16	—	—	—	—	—	
Warwick, Grant	Canada	RW	1941–1948	293	117	116	233	179	6	0	1	1	2	
Watson, Phil†	Canada	RW/C	1935–1943; 1944–1948	546	127	233	360	471	45	7	20	27	51	SC 1940
Webster, John	Canada	C	1949–1950	14	0	0	0	4	—	—	—	—	—	
Weight, Doug	United States	C	1991–1993	118	23	47	70	78	8	2	2	4	0	
Weise, Dale	Canada	RW	2010–2011	10	0	0	0	19	—	—	—	—	—	
Wennberg, Alexander	Sweden	C	2023–2024	19	1	4	5	0	16	1	1	2	4	
Wells, Jay†	Canada	D	1991–1995	186	5	23	28	277	46	0	2	2	38	SC 1994
Wharton, Len	Canada	D	1944–1945	1	0	0	0	0	—	—	—	—	—	
Wheeldon, Simon	Canada	C	1988–1989	11	0	2	2	6	—	—	—	—	—	
Wheeler, Blake	United States	RW	2023–2024	54	9	12	21	23	1	0	0	0	2	
Whistle, Rob	Canada	D	1985–1986	32	4	2	6	10	3	0	0	0	2	
White, Sherman	Canada	C	1946–1947; 1949–1950	4	0	2	2	0	—	—	—	—	—	
White, Todd	Canada	C	2010–2011	18	1	1	2	2	—	—	—	—	—	
Whitfield, Trent	Canada	C	2001–2002	1	0	0	0	0	—	—	—	—	—	
Wickenheiser, Doug	Canada	C	1988–1989	1	1	0	1	0	—	—	—	—	—	
Widing, Juha	Sweden	C	1969–1970	44	7	7	14	10	—	—	—	—	—	
Wiemer, Jim	Canada	D	1984–1986	29	7	3	10	32	9	1	0	1	6	
Wilkie, David	United States	D	2000–2001	1	0	0	0	2	—	—	—	—	—	
Williams, Jeremy	Canada	RW	2010–2011	1	0	0	0	0	—	—	—	—	—	
Williams, Tom	Canada	LW	1971–1974	25	1	3	4	6	—	—	—	—	—	
Wilson, Bert	Canada	LW	1973–1975	66	6	2	8	68	—	—	—	—	—	
Wilson, Carey	Canada	C	1988–1990	82	30	51	81	102	14	3	3	6	2	
Wilson, Johnny	Canada	LW	1960–1962	96	25	15	40	38	6	2	2	4	4	
Wilson, Mike	Canada	D	2002–2003	1	0	0	0	0	—	—	—	—	—	
Wiseman, Chad	Canada	LW	2003–2006	5	1	1	2	4	—	—	—	—	—	
Witehall, Johan	Sweden	LW	1998–2001	28	1	4	5	10	—	—	—	—	—	
Wolski, Wojtek	Poland	LW	2010–2012	46	6	16	22	10	5	1	2	3	0	
Wood, Bob	Canada	D	1950–1951	1	0	0	0	0	—	—	—	—	—	
Woywitka, Jeff	Canada	D	2011–2012	27	1	5	6	8	—	—	—	—	—	
Wylie, Bill	Canada	C	1950–1951	1	0	0	0	0	—	—	—	—	—	
York, Harry	Canada	C	1997–1999	7	0	0	0	4	—	—	—	—	—	
York, Mike	United States	LW	1999–2002	230	58	80	138	54	—	—	—	—	—	
Younghans, Tom	United States	RW	1981–1982	47	3	5	8	17	2	0	0	0	0	
Yandle, Keith	United States	D	2014–2016	103	7	51	58	48	24	3	9	12	12	
Zamuner, Rob	Canada	LW	1991–1992	9	1	2	3	2	—	—	—	—	—	
Zanussi, Joe	Canada	D	1974–1975	8	0	2	2	4	—	—	—	—	—	
Zherdev, Nikolay	Russia	LW/RW	2008–2009	82	23	35	58	39	7	0	0	0	2	
Zibanejad, Mika*	Sweden	C	2016–2026	730	284	383	667	207	58	17	38	55	12	
Zubov, Sergei†	Russia	D	1992–1995	165	30	126	156	61	32	8	22	30	2	SC 1994
Zuccarello, Mats	Norway	LW	2010–2019	509	113	239	352	215	60	11	20	31	46	
