= 1943 Allan Cup =

Canadian senior ice hockey championship

The Allan Cup trophy

The 1943 Allan Cup was the Canadian senior ice hockey championship for the 1942–43 season.

== Final ==
Best of 5

- Ottawa 4 Victoria 3
- Ottawa 6 Victoria 4
- Victoria 4 Ottawa 3
- Ottawa 2 Victoria 0

Ottawa Commandos beat Victoria Army 3-1 on series.
