= Kansas City Scout (disambiguation) =

Kansas City Scout may refer to:

- The Scout (Kansas City, Missouri statue), a statue by Cyrus E. Dallin in Kansas City, Missouri
  - Kansas City Scout, a traffic management system
  - Kansas City Scouts, a defunct hockey team in Kansas City that existed between 1974 and 1976
  - Kansas City Scouts (NAHL), an NAHL hockey team that never played
