= List of NHL players (D) =

This is a list of National Hockey League (NHL) players who have played at least one game in the NHL from 1917 to present and have a last name that starts with "D".

List updated as of the 2018–19 NHL season.

== D'A–Da ==
- Matt D'Agostini
- Corrie D'Alessio
- Jerry D'Amigo
- Hank D'Amore
- Marc D'Amour
- Joey Daccord
- Kirby Dach
- Andreas Dackell
- Evgenii Dadonov
- Doug Dadswell
- Byron Dafoe
- Pierre Dagenais
- Kevin Dahl
- Klas Dahlbeck
- Jonathan Dahlen
- Ulf Dahlen
- Kjell Dahlin
- Rasmus Dahlin
- Toni Dahlman
- Chris Dahlquist
- Carl "Cully" Dahlstrom (born 1912)
- Carl Dahlstrom (born 1995)
- Alain Daigle
- Alexandre Daigle
- J. J. Daigneault
- Bob Dailey
- Michael Dal Colle
- Frank Daley
- Joe Daley
- Patrick Daley
- Trevor Daley
- Brad Dalgarno
- Kevin Dallman
- Marty Dallman
- Rod Dallman
- Zac Dalpe
- Napoleon Dame
- Riley Damiani
- Nick Damore
- Jean-Francois Damphousse
- Vincent Damphousse
- Phillip Danault
- Mathieu Dandenault
- Ken Daneyko
- Justin Danforth
- Jeff Daniels
- Kimbi Daniels
- Scott Daniels
- Yann Danis
- Marko Dano
- Oscar Dansk
- Mike Danton
- Dan Daoust
- Craig Darby
- Mathieu Darche
- Mike Dark
- Scott Darling
- Harold Darragh
- Jack Darragh
- Cleon Daskalakis
- Pavel Datsyuk
- Laurent Dauphin
- Richard David
- Bob Davidson
- Brandon Davidson
- Gordon Davidson
- John Davidson
- Matt Davidson
- Johan Davidsson
- Jonathan Davidsson
- Bob Davie
- Jeremy Davies
- Ken Davies
- Bob Davis
- Kim Davis
- Lorne Davis
- Mal Davis
- Murray Davison
- Rob Davison
- Evgeny Davydov
- Jeff Daw
- Jason Dawe
- Bob Dawes
- Nigel Dawes
- Nico Daws
- Clarence "Hap" Day
- Joe Day
- Sean Day
- Eric Daze

== De ==
- Dean De Fazio
- Calvin de Haan
- Jacob de la Rose
- Chase De Leo
- Greg De Vries
- Billy Dea
- Jean-Sebastien Dea
- Don Deacon
- Adam Deadmarsh
- Butch Deadmarsh
- Barry Dean
- Kevin Dean
- Zach Dean
- Tony DeAngelo
- Nelson DeBenedet
- Lucien DeBlois
- Dave Debol
- Alex DeBrincat
- Jake DeBrusk
- Louie DeBrusk
- Bob DeCourcy
- Brad DeFauw
- Brandon DeFazio
- Norm Defelice
- Dale DeGray
- Denis DeJordy
- Danny DeKeyser
- Luca Del Bel Belluz
- Marc Del Gaizo
- Ethan Del Mastro
- Michael Del Zotto
- Matt DelGuidice
- Collin Delia
- Jonathan Delisle
- Xavier Delisle
- Aaron Dell
- Ty Dellandrea
- Armand Delmonte
- Andy Delmore
- Gilbert Delorme
- Ron Delorme
- Val Delory
- Guy Delparte
- Alex Delvecchio
- Ab DeMarco
- Ab DeMarco, Jr.
- Dylan DeMelo
- Jason Demers
- Tony Demers
- Pavol Demitra
- Thatcher Demko
- Nathan Dempsey
- Jean-Paul Denis
- Louis Denis
- Marc Denis
- Grigori Denisenko
- Corbett Denneny
- Cy Denneny
- Norm Dennis
- Gerry Denoird
- Larry DePalma
- Semyon Der-Arguchintsev
- Bill Derlago
- Travis Dermott
- Philippe DeRouville
- Gerry Desaulniers
- Matthieu Descoteaux
- Joffre Desilets
- Nick DeSimone
- David Desharnais
- Vincent Desharnais
- Andrew Desjardins
- Cedrick Desjardins
- Eric Desjardins
- Gerry Desjardins
- Martin Desjardins
- Victor Desjardins
- Jacques Deslauriers
- Jeff Deslauriers
- Nicolas Deslauriers
- Casey DeSmith
- Elliot Desnoyers
- Simon Despres
- Patrick DesRochers
- Jarrett Deuling
- Boyd Devereaux
- Jamie Devane
- Kevin Devine
- Connor Dewar
- Tom Dewar
- Al Dewsbury
- Michel Deziel

== Dh–Di ==
- Marcel "Ching" Dheere
- Phillip Di Giuseppe
- Thomas Di Pauli
- Ed Diachuk
- Raphael Diaz
- Harry Dick
- Ernie Dickens
- Herb Dickenson
- Bill Dickie
- Jason Dickinson
- Chris DiDomenico
- Gerald Diduck
- Don Dietrich
- Darren Dietz
- Bob Dill
- Bob Dillabough
- Brenden Dillon
- Cecil Dillon
- Gary Dillon
- Wayne Dillon
- Rob DiMaio
- Niko Dimitrakos
- Bill Dineen
- Cam Dineen
- Gary Dineen
- Gord Dineen
- Kevin Dineen
- Peter Dineen
- Chris Dingman
- Chuck "Dinny" Dinsmore
- Connie Dion
- Michel Dion
- Gilbert Dionne
- Marcel Dionne
- Joe DiPenta
- Michael DiPietro
- Paul DiPietro
- Rick DiPietro
- Robert Dirk
- Jon DiSalvatore
- Reinhard Divis
- Tomas Divisek

== Dj–Do ==
- Christian Djoos
- Par Djoos
- Gary Doak
- Josh Doan
- Shane Doan
- Brian Dobbin
- Jim Dobson
- Noah Dobson
- Fred Doherty
- Jason Doig
- Bobby Dollas
- Robert Dome
- Hnat Domenichelli
- Max Domi
- Tie Domi
- Louis Domingue
- Gary Donaldson
- Clark Donatelli
- Ryan Donato
- Ted Donato
- Dave Donnelly
- Gord Donnelly
- James "Babe" Donnelly
- Mike Donnelly
- Matt Donovan
- Shean Donovan
- Joonas Donskoi
- Jamie Doornbosch
- Jiri Dopita
- Rob Dopson
- John Doran
- Lloyd Doran
- Ken Doraty
- Andre Dore
- Daniel Dore
- Jim Dorey
- Dan Dorion
- Gary Dornhoefer
- Pavel Dorofeyev
- Ed Dorohoy
- Derek Dorsett
- Lukas Dostal
- Jake Dotchin
- Drew Doughty
- Jordy Douglas
- Kent Douglas
- Les Douglas
- Doug Doull
- Peter Douris
- Jim Dowd
- Nic Dowd
- Bruce Dowie
- Justin Dowling
- Aaron Downey
- Dave Downie
- Steve Downie
- Mario Doyon

== Dr ==
- Leon Draisaitl
- Dallas Drake
- Bruce Draper
- Kris Draper
- Tom Draper
- Hunter Drew
- Davis Drewiske
- Sheldon Dries
- Gordie Drillon
- Peter Driscoll
- Bruce Driver
- Rene Drolet
- Ivan Droppa
- Clarence Drouillard
- Jonathan Drouin
- Jude Drouin
- P. C. Drouin
- Polly Drouin
- John Druce
- Harold Druken
- Stan Drulia
- Jim Drummond
- Chris Drury
- Herb Drury
- Jack Drury
- Ted Drury
- Dave Dryden
- Ken Dryden
- Jamie Drysdale

== Du–Dz ==
- Christian Dube
- Dillon Dube
- Gilles Dube
- Norm Dube
- Pierrick Dube
- Justin Duberman
- Wade Dubielewicz
- Brandon Dubinsky
- Steve Dubinsky
- Devan Dubnyk
- Pierre-Luc Dubois
- Matt Duchene
- Gaetan Duchesne
- Steve Duchesne
- Anthony Duclair
- Rick Dudley
- Walker Duehr
- Dave Duerden
- Dick Duff
- Parris Duffus
- Luc Dufour
- Marc Dufour
- William Dufour
- Donald Dufresne
- Jack Duggan
- Ken Duggan
- Ron Duguay
- Lorne Duguid
- Brandon Duhaime
- Woody Dumart
- Michel Dumas
- Mathew Dumba
- Gabriel Dumont
- Jean-Pierre Dumont
- Brian Dumoulin
- Dale Dunbar
- Art Duncan
- Iain Duncan
- Craig Duncanson
- Rocky Dundas
- Mike Dunham
- Frank Dunlap
- Blake Dunlop
- Dave Dunn
- Richie Dunn
- Vince Dunn
- Josh Dunne
- Denis Dupere
- Andre Dupont
- Jerry Dupont
- Micki DuPont
- Norm Dupont
- Yanick Dupre
- Bob Dupuis
- Pascal Dupuis
- Arnaud Durandeau
- Steve Durbano
- Vitezslav Duris
- Bill Durnan
- Chris Durno
- Sean Durzi
- Norm Dussault
- L. S. Dutkowski
- Red Dutton
- Christian Dvorak
- Miroslav Dvorak
- Radek Dvorak
- Gordie Dwyer
- Mike Dwyer
- Patrick Dwyer
- Ed Dyck
- Henry Dyck
- Babe Dye
- Karl Dykhuis
- Steve Dykstra
- Jack Dyte
- Joe Dziedzic
- Ryan Dzingel
- David Dziurzynski

== See also ==
- hockeydb.com NHL Player List - D
