= List of Kansas City Scouts draft picks =

The Kansas City Scouts were a professional ice hockey team based in Kansas City, Missouri. They were members of the Smythe Division in the Clarence Campbell Conference of the National Hockey League (NHL). The Scouts participated in three NHL amateur drafts, where participating teams select newly eligible players in a predefined order, and drafted 26 players.

== Key ==
# Played at least one game with the Scouts
↑ Spent entire NHL career with the Scouts

General terms and abbreviations
Term or abbreviation	Definition
Draft	The year that the player was selected
Round	The round of the draft in which the player was selected
Pick	The overall position in the draft at which the player was selected

Position abbreviations
Abbreviation	Definition
G	Goaltender
D	Defense
LW	Left wing
C	Center
RW	Right wing
F	Forward

Abbreviations for statistical columns
Abbreviation	Definition
Pos	Position
GP	Games played
G	Goals
A	Assists
Pts	Points
PIM	Penalties in minutes
W	Wins
L	Losses
T	Ties
GAA	Goals against average
—	Does not apply

== Draft picks ==
Draft	Round	Pick	Player	Nationality	Pos	GP	G	A	Pts	PIM	W	L	T	GAA
1974	1	2	Wilf Paiement#	Canada	RW	946	356	458	814	1757	—	—	—	—
1974	2	20	Glen Burdon↑	Canada	D	11	0	2	2	0	—	—	—	—
1974	3	38	Bob Bourne	Canada	C	964	258	324	582	605	—	—	—	—
1974	4	56	Roger Lemelin#	Canada	D	36	1	2	3	27	—	—	—	—
1974	5	74	Mark Lomenda	Canada	RW	—	—	—	—	—	—	—	—	—
1974	6	92	John Shewchuk	United States	C	—	—	—	—	—	—	—	—	—
1974	7	110	Mike Boland#	Canada	D	23	1	2	3	29	—	—	—	—
1974	9	145	Brian Kuruliak	Canada	LW	—	—	—	—	—	—	—	—	—
1974	10	162	Denis Carufel	Canada	LW	—	—	—	—	—	—	—	—	—
1974	11	177	Soren Johansson	Sweden	C	—	—	—	—	—	—	—	—	—
1974	12	191	Mats Ulander	Sweden	LW	—	—	—	—	—	—	—	—	—
1974	13	203	Ed Pizunski	Canada	RW	—	—	—	—	—	—	—	—	—
1974	14	213	Willie Wing	Canada	RW	—	—	—	—	—	—	—	—	—
1975	1	2	Barry Dean	Canada	LW	165	25	56	81	146	—	—	—	—
1975	2	20	Don Cairns#	Canada	LW	9	0	1	1	2	—	—	—	—
1975	3	38	Neil Lyseng	Canada	RW	—	—	—	—	—	—	—	—	—
1975	4	56	Ron Delorme	Canada	RW	524	83	83	166	667	—	—	—	—
1975	5	74	Terry McDonald↑	Canada	D	8	0	1	1	6	—	—	—	—
1975	6	92	Eric Sanderson	Canada	LW	—	—	—	—	—	—	—	—	—
1975	7	110	Bill Oleschuk#	Canada	G	55	0	0	0	14	7	28	10	3.98
1975	8	128	Joe Baker	United States	D	—	—	—	—	—	—	—	—	—
1975	9	145	Scott Williams	Canada	LW	—	—	—	—	—	—	—	—	—
1976	1	11	Paul Gardner	Canada	C	447	201	201	402	207	—	—	—	—
1976	3	38	Mike Kitchen	Canada	D	474	12	62	74	370	—	—	—	—
1976	5	74	Rick McIntyre	Canada	LW	—	—	—	—	—	—	—	—	—
1976	6	92	Larry Skinner	Canada	C	47	10	12	22	8	—	—	—	—

== See also ==
- List of Kansas City Scouts players
- 1974 NHL Expansion Draft
- List of Colorado Rockies draft picks
- List of New Jersey Devils draft picks
