= Plager =

Plager is a surname. Notable people with the surname include:

- Barclay Plager (1941–1988), Canadian ice hockey defenceman
- Bill Plager (1945–2016), Canadian ice hockey defenceman
- Bob Plager (1943–2021), Canadian ice hockey defenceman
- S. Jay Plager (born 1931), Senior United States Circuit Judge of the United States Court of Appeals for the Federal Circuit
