= Trevor Fahey =

Canadian ice hockey player

- Born: January 4, 1944 (age 81); New Waterford, Nova Scotia, Canada
- Height: 6 ft 1 in (185 cm)
- Weight: 175 lb (79 kg; 12 st 7 lb)
- Position: Left wing
- Shot: Left
- Played for: New York Rangers
- Playing career: 1964–1974

John Trevor Fahey (born January 4, 1944) is a Canadian retired professional ice hockey left winger who played in one National Hockey League game for the New York Rangers during the 1964–65 season. The rest of his career, which lasted from 1964 to 1974, was spent in the minor leagues.

== Playing career ==
Fahey was assigned to the Tillsonburg Mavericks of the Western Ontario Hockey League for the 1960-61 season. He was called up at the end of the season to play with the Guelph Royals in the playoffs alongside the likes of future NHL players Rod Gilbert, Jean Ratelle, and Bob Plager.

== Post-playing career ==
Following his playing career, Fahey published two hockey books entitled "All About Hockey" (1974) and "Hockey: Canadian/Soviet" (1977). He served as head coach of the Brandon Bobcats of the Great Plains Athletic Conference, leading team to a championship in 1975. He was later named athletic director at Brandon University. Fahey founded the Coach International Hockey Schools in Manitoba in 1980. He moved to Florida in 1995 and was instrumental in starting the Tampa Bay Raiders Minor Hockey Association.

In 2012, he was inducted into the Cape Breton Sports Hall of Fame during the Cape Breton Sport Heritage Awards ceremony at Centre 200. He currently resides in Tampa Bay and continues to coach hockey.

== Career statistics ==
=== Regular season and playoffs ===
			Regular season					Playoffs
Season	Team	League	GP	G	A	Pts	PIM	GP	G	A	Pts	PIM
1960–61	Guelph Royals	OHA	4	1	1	2	0	13	0	1	1	0
1961–62	Guelph Royals	OHA	26	3	2	5	6	—	—	—	—	—
1962–63	Guelph Royals	OHA	39	26	17	43	26	—	—	—	—	—
1963–64	Kitchener Rangers	OHA	35	17	11	28	23	—	—	—	—	—
1964–65	New York Rangers	NHL	1	0	0	0	0	—	—	—	—	—
1964–65	New York Rovers	EHL	72	30	25	55	41	—	—	—	—	—
1965–66	Minnesota Rangers	CHL	67	13	9	22	4	6	1	2	3	0
1966–67	Omaha Knights	CHL	54	8	5	13	22	7	0	2	2	8
1967–68	Toledo Blades	IHL	4	0	0	0	0	—	—	—	—	—
1967–68	Des Moines Oak Leafs	IHL	53	37	39	76	22	—	—	—	—	—
1968–69	Des Moines Oak Leafs	IHL	66	27	43	70	56	—	—	—	—	—
1968–69	Denver Spurs	WHL	5	1	1	2	0	—	—	—	—	—
1969–70	Des Moines Oak Leafs	IHL	12	4	7	11	64	—	—	—	—	—
1969–70	Fort Wayne Komets	IHL	55	21	26	47	10	3	1	1	2	5
1970–71	St. Francis Xavier University	CIAU	20	19	23	42	44	—	—	—	—	—
1971–72	St. Francis Xavier University	CIAU	20	15	13	28	87	—	—	—	—	—
1972–73	St. Francis Xavier University	CIAU	20	19	22	41	28	—	—	—	—	—
1973–74	St. Francis Xavier University	CIAU	19	17	16	33	34	—	—	—	—	—
IHL totals			190	89	115	204	152	3	1	1	2	5
NHL totals			1	0	0	0	0	—	—	—	—	—

== See also ==
- List of players who played only one game in the NHL
