= Guelph Royals =

Guelph Royals may refer to the following Canadian sports teams:

- Guelph Royals (baseball)
- Guelph Royals (ice hockey)
