= Eddie Bush =

Canadian ice hockey player and coach

- Born: July 11, 1918 Collingwood, Ontario, Canada
- Died: May 31, 1984 (aged 65) London, Ontario, Canada
- Height: 6 ft 1 in (185 cm)
- Weight: 195 lb (88 kg; 13 st 13 lb)
- Position: Defence
- Shot: Right
- Played for: Detroit Red Wings
- Playing career: 1938–1951

Edward Webster Bush (July 11, 1918 — May 31, 1984) was a Canadian ice hockey defenceman and coach. He played 26 games in the National Hockey League (NHL) with the Detroit Red Wings between 1939 and 1942. The rest of his career, which lasted from 1938 to 1951, was spent in various minor leagues. He later became a coach, spending several years in the junior Ontario Hockey Association, finishing by coaching the Kansas City Scouts of the NHL for 32 games during their second and final season in 1975–76.

== Career ==
Bush began his career by playing junior hockey in Guelph, Ontario. He then became a hockey vagabond, playing on fourteen separate squads over thirteen years as a professional. He played 26 games over parts of two seasons in the National Hockey League for the Detroit Red Wings, but spent most of his career in the American Hockey League Bush also saw his career interrupted by military service, as he took off the entire 1945-46 campaign to serve in the Royal Canadian Air Force. Bush's five-point Game 3 in the 1942 Stanley Cup Finals remains the record for defensemen in a championship round game.

In 1950, Bush began his long coaching career by presiding over his hometown junior club, the Collingwood Shipbuilders. He later led a variety of other teams, including the Guelph Biltmores, Kitchener Rangers and Hamilton Red Wings ( he coached Hamilton to a 1962 Memorial Cup victory) of junior hockey, and the Quebec Aces and Richmond Robins of the AHL. He took a job as a scout with the fledgling Kansas City Scouts, and he served as interim coach for 32 games in 1976.

== Career statistics ==
=== Regular season and playoffs ===
			Regular season					Playoffs
Season	Team	League	GP	G	A	Pts	PIM	GP	G	A	Pts	PIM
1936–37	Guelph Indians	OHA	10	7	3	10	24	5	2	1	3	8
1937–38	Guelph Indians	OHA	14	8	4	12	41	9	7	6	13	18
1937–38	Guelph Indians	M-Cup	—	—	—	—	—	3	1	0	1	6
1938–39	Detroit Red Wings	NHL	8	0	0	0	0	—	—	—	—	—
1938–39	Pittsburgh Hornets	IAHL	16	1	2	3	18	—	—	—	—	—
1938–39	Kansas City Greyhounds	AHA	25	4	13	17	69	—	—	—	—	—
1939–40	Indianapolis Capitals	AHL	41	7	10	17	49	2	0	0	0	2
1940–41	Indianapolis Capitals	AHL	19	2	3	5	33	—	—	—	—	—
1940–41	Providence Reds	AHL	37	8	10	18	60	4	2	0	2	11
1941–42	Detroit Red Wings	NHL	18	4	6	10	60	11	1	6	7	23
1941–42	Providence Reds	AHL	36	12	24	36	62	—	—	—	—	—
1942–43	Toronto RCAF	OHA Sr	8	0	2	2	25	1	0	2	2	2
1942–43	Toronto RCAF	Al-Cup	—	—	—	—	—	2	0	1	1	38
1943–44	Dartmouth RCAF	NSDHL	3	1	3	4	4	—	—	—	—	—
1944–45	Dartmouth RCAF	NSDHL	4	1	1	2	6	—	—	—	—	—
1946–47	St. Louis Flyers	AHL	34	5	14	19	71	—	—	—	—	—
1946–47	Providence Reds	AHL	26	7	11	18	111	—	—	—	—	—
1947–48	Philadelphia Rockets	AHL	68	24	48	72	163	—	—	—	—	—
1948–49	Philadelphia Rockets	AHL	46	2	16	18	72	—	—	—	—	—
1948–49	Cleveland Barons	AHL	21	3	5	8	41	1	0	0	0	4
1949–50	Cincinnati Mohawks	IHL	8	0	2	2	12	—	—	—	—	—
1949–50	Louisville Blades	USHL	8	0	7	7	28	—	—	—	—	—
1949–50	Sherbrooke Saints	QSHL	31	7	18	25	89	8	4	2	6	16
1949–50	Sherbrooke Saints	Al-Cup	—	—	—	—	—	10	2	7	9	27
1950–51	Collingwood Shipbuilders	OHA Sr	—	—	—	—	—	—	—	—	—	—
IAHL/AHL totals			352	71	145	216	692	7	2	0	2	17
NHL totals			26	4	6	10	60	11	1	6	7	23

== Coaching record ==
Team	Year	Regular season						Postseason
Team	Year	G	W	L	T	Pts	Finish	Result
Kansas City Scouts	1975–76	32	1	23	8	36)	5th in Smythe	Missed playoffs

Preceded by Sid Abel	Head coach of the Kansas City Scouts; 1976	Succeeded by Johnny Wilson
