= Barry Dean =

Barry Dean may refer to:

- Barry Dean (ice hockey) (born 1955), Canadian ice hockey player
- Barry Dean (songwriter) (born 1967), American country and pop music songwriter
