= Paul Gardner (ice hockey) =

Canadian ice hockey player and coach

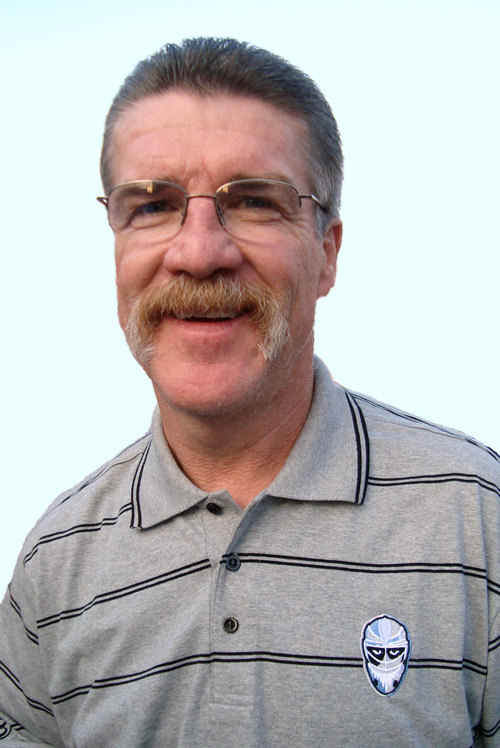
- Gardner in 2009
- Born: March 5, 1956 (age 70) Fort Erie, Ontario, Canada
- Height: 5 ft 11 in (180 cm)
- Weight: 180 lb (82 kg; 12 st 12 lb)
- Position: Centre
- Shot: Left
- Played for: Colorado Rockies; Toronto Maple Leafs; Pittsburgh Penguins; Washington Capitals; Buffalo Sabres
- NHL draft: 11th overall, 1976; Kansas City Scouts
- WHA draft: 24th overall, 1976; Toronto Toros
- Playing career: 1976–1986

Paul Malone Gardner (born March 5, 1956) is a Canadian professional ice hockey coach and a former centre, who most recently coached at Löwen Frankfurt in Germany.

Gardner is the son of former National Hockey League (NHL) player Cal Gardner and the younger brother of Dave Gardner. Paul was born in Fort Erie, Ontario while his father Cal was playing with the Boston Bruins.

== Playing career ==
As a youth, Gardner played in the 1968 Quebec International Pee-Wee Hockey Tournament with a minor ice hockey team from Leaside.

Drafted in 1976 by the Kansas City Scouts of the National Hockey League, he never got an opportunity to play for them - that same year, the Scouts franchise moved to Denver and was re-named the Colorado Rockies.

=== Colorado Rockies ===
Gardner, who had also been drafted by the Toronto Toros of the World Hockey Association, instead turned pro with the Rockies' farm team the Rhode Island Reds. The bulk of his rookie pro season was spent in the National Hockey League, however, where he scored an impressive 30 goals and 59 points in sixty games. He finished second on the club in both goals and points and managed 30 more goals (in just 46 games) during his second year in the league. Despite the prolific start to his NHL career, Colorado traded him midway through his third season to the Toronto Maple Leafs, who had been rumored to be targeting Gardner prior to the March 15, 1979 NHL trade deadline.

=== Toronto Maple Leafs ===
In Toronto Gardner joined the same team for whom his father Cal had played four seasons. Gardner started well after the trade scoring nine points including seven goals in eleven games with the Leafs to finish the season. However the following year he struggled with just eleven goals in 45 games. After failing to make the roster to start the 1980-81 season, the Maple Leafs dealt Gardner, along with Dave Burrows to the Pittsburgh Penguins in exchange for Paul Marshall and Kim Davis.

=== Pittsburgh Penguins ===
In Pittsburgh Gardner rediscovered his scoring touch reeling off seasons of 34, 36 and 28 goals as one of the club's top scoring threats. His fourth year with the Penguins saw him suddenly struggle with no goals in 16 games which led to him being assigned to the Penguins minor league affiliate in Baltimore. Gardner led the AHL team in scoring with 32 goals and 81 points in just 54 games.

=== Washington Capitals ===
His solid play in the American League earned him another chance to find his game at the NHL level when the Washington Capitals offered him a contract for the 1984-85 season. Gardner managed just 2 goals and 6 points in 12 games with Washington but had an explosive season for their farm club. Gardner led the AHL in scoring with 51 goals and 130 points in just 64 games. Despite his lofty production, the Capitals opted not to bring him back for a second year.

=== Buffalo Sabres ===
The Buffalo Sabres inked Gardner to a free agent deal but he appeared in just two games with them spending the rest of the season dominating the American Hockey League again en route to his second-straight league leading performance. He potted 61 goals and 112 points for Rochester Americans then retired from professional hockey at years end.

Eleven years after retiring, while serving as the assistant coach for the Washington Capitals AHL affiliate the Portland Pirates, Gardner was pressed into action when the team was short on players due to injury. Gardner managed to pick up an assist in the game. This assist extended an impressive accomplishment for Gardner: During his pro career he suited up with seven different American Hockey League teams and he produced at a point-a-game or better for every one of them.

== Coaching career ==
Shortly after his playing career ended, Gardner jumped into the coaching profession, becoming head coach of the Newmarket Saints of the American Hockey League for four seasons. He later became an assistant coach for the Baltimore Skipjacks (later Portland Pirates after their relocation) under coach Barry Trotz. Both Trotz and Gardner were later promoted to the NHL level when they moved to Nashville to work for the expansion Predators. Gardner would be assistant coach through the 2002–03 season and then worked as a pro scout for the organization.

In January 2007, he was named head coach of the Russian KHL team Lokomotiv Yaroslavl. He guided the team to a nine-game winning streak and made the playoffs, but was released in February 2008. In the summer of 2008, he was named head coach of Dynamo Minsk in Belarus and assistant coach of the Belarus national team. In late July 2008, his contract was cancelled for personal reasons.

On December 18, 2008, he became the coach of the Hamburg Freezers of the Deutsche Eishockey Liga (DEL) and guided the Freezers to the playoff-quarterfinals that season. In Gardner's second season at the helm, Hamburg did not qualify for the playoffs. His contract expired at the end of the 2009-10 season.

Gardner signed with the Mississippi RiverKings of the Central Hockey League (CHL) for the 2010-11 campaign. On July 29, 2011, Gardner was relieved of his duties for the following season.

In September 13, 2011 Gardner was named head coach of fellow CHL team Bloomington Blaze. On January 18, 2013 Gardner was appointed head coach of the Braehead Clan of the Elite Ice Hockey League. He guided the Scottish club to the EIHL Gardiner Conference Championship and a playoff-quarterfinal appearance, but did not have his contract renewed at the end of the 2012-13 season.

In Mai 2013, Gardner was named head coach of Dutch Eredivisie side Tilburg Trappers, signing a two-year deal with the team. Under his guidance, the Trappers won back-to-back Dutch championship titles and Dutch cup titles.

On January 1, 2016, German second-division club Lausitzer Füchse hired Gardner as their new head coach. He stayed on the job through the end of the 2015-16 season. On June 29, 2016, Gardner took over the coaching job at fellow DEL2 side Löwen Frankfurt, working alongside sporting director Rich Chernomaz. He guided the Frankfurt team to the 2017 DEL2 title in his first year in charge. Gardner was sacked on March 17, 2018, during the playoff quarterfinal series against Kassel, in which the Frankfurt team had lost the first two games.

In 2019, Gardner was inducted into the Leaside Sports Hall of Fame. Both his brother Dave and father Cal have also been inducted into the Leaside Sports Hall of Fame.

== Career statistics ==
			Regular season					Playoffs
Season	Team	League	GP	G	A	Pts	PIM	GP	G	A	Pts	PIM
1973–74	St. Michael's Buzzers	MetJHL	44	87	44	131	—	—	—	—	—	—
1974–75	Oshawa Generals	OMJHL	64	27	36	63	54	5	0	0	0	9
1975–76	Oshawa Generals	OMJHL	65	69	75	144	75	4	2	3	5	2
1976–77	Rhode Island Reds	AHL	14	10	4	14	12	—	—	—	—	—
1976–77	Colorado Rockies	NHL	60	30	29	59	25	—	—	—	—	—
1977–78	Colorado Rockies	NHL	46	30	22	52	29	—	—	—	—	—
1978–79	Colorado Rockies	NHL	64	23	26	49	32	—	—	—	—	—
1978–79	Toronto Maple Leafs	NHL	11	7	2	9	0	6	0	1	1	4
1979–80	New Brunswick Hawks	AHL	20	11	16	27	14	15	10	5	15	5
1979–80	Toronto Maple Leafs	NHL	45	11	13	24	10	—	—	—	—	—
1980–81	Springfield Indians	AHL	14	9	12	21	6	—	—	—	—	—
1980–81	Pittsburgh Penguins	NHL	62	34	40	74	59	5	1	0	1	8
1981–82	Pittsburgh Penguins	NHL	59	36	33	69	28	5	1	5	6	2
1982–83	Pittsburgh Penguins	NHL	70	28	27	55	12	—	—	—	—	—
1983–84	Baltimore Skipjacks	AHL	54	32	49	81	14	10	12	10	22	0
1983–84	Pittsburgh Penguins	NHL	16	0	5	5	6	—	—	—	—	—
1984–85	Binghamton Whalers	AHL	64	51	79	130	10	5	3	9	12	0
1984–85	Washington Capitals	NHL	12	2	4	6	6	—	—	—	—	—
1985–86	Rochester Americans	AHL	71	61	51	112	16	—	—	—	—	—
1985–86	Buffalo Sabres	NHL	2	0	0	0	0	—	—	—	—	—
1996–97	Portland Pirates	AHL	1	0	1	1	0	—	—	—	—	—
NHL totals			447	201	201	402	207	16	2	6	8	14
AHL totals			238	174	212	386	72	30	25	24	49	5

== See also ==
- Notable families in the NHL

Preceded by Barry Dean	Kansas City Scouts first-round draft pick 1976	Succeeded by Barry Beck
