= Bob Cunningham (ice hockey) =

Canadian ice hockey player

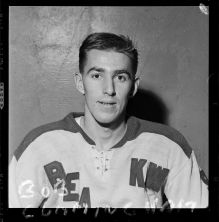
- Cunningham in KW Beavers jersey (1961)
- Born: February 26, 1941 (age 85) Welland, Ontario, Canada
- Height: 5 ft 11 in (180 cm)
- Weight: 168 lb (76 kg; 12 st 0 lb)
- Position: Centre
- Shot: Left
- Played for: New York Rangers
- Playing career: 1960–1974

Robert Graham Cunningham (born February 26, 1941) is a Canadian retired professional ice hockey centre. He played 4 games in the National Hockey League for the New York Rangers during the 1960–61 and 1961–62 seasons. The rest of his career, which lasted from 1960 to 1974, was spent in the minor leagues.

== Career statistics ==
=== Regular season and playoffs ===
			Regular season					Playoffs
Season	Team	League	GP	G	A	Pts	PIM	GP	G	A	Pts	PIM
1958–59	Guelph Biltmores	OHA	54	19	27	46	25	10	1	6	7	8
1959–60	Guelph Biltmores	OHA	48	14	23	37	26	3	1	2	3	0
1959–60	Trois-Rivières Lions	EPHL	3	1	3	4	2	5	1	1	2	0
1960–61	New York Rangers	NHL	3	0	1	1	0	—	—	—	—	—
1960–61	Guelph Royals	OHA	47	34	52	86	78	14	11	10	21	39
1961–62	New York Rangers	NHL	1	0	0	0	0	—	—	—	—	—
1961–62	Kitchener Beavers	EPHL	38	5	11	16	18	7	0	1	1	4
1962–63	Baltimore Clippers	AHL	57	9	17	26	21	3	0	1	1	0
1963–64	St. Paul Rangers	CPHL	69	25	47	72	32	8	1	5	6	7
1964–65	St. Louis Braves	CPHL	47	15	35	50	14	—	—	—	—	—
1965–66	Pittsburgh Hornets	AHL	65	10	21	31	14	3	0	0	0	0
1966–67	Baltimore Clippers	AHL	63	17	35	52	6	9	2	3	5	0
1967–68	Baltimore Clippers	AHL	71	13	30	43	8	—	—	—	—	—
1968–69	Baltimore Clippers	AHL	46	5	12	17	22	—	—	—	—	—
1968–69	Denver Spurs	WHL	17	8	5	13	0	—	—	—	—	—
1969–70	Denver Spurs	WHL	22	4	13	17	2	—	—	—	—	—
1969–70	Port Huron Flags	IHL	22	8	17	25	24	8	3	3	6	2
1970–71	Orillia Terriers	OHA Sr	40	15	29	44	32	—	—	—	—	—
1971–72	Barrie Flyers	OHA Sr	40	24	45	69	53	16	6	15	21	22
1972–73	Barrie Flyers	OHA Sr	35	23	43	66	10	—	—	—	—	—
1973–74	Brantford Foresters	OHA Sr	32	19	31	50	8	—	—	—	—	—
AHL totals			302	54	115	169	71	15	2	4	6	0
NHL totals			4	0	1	1	0	—	—	—	—	—
