= Sören Johansson =

Swedish ice hockey player

- Born: July 11, 1954 (age 70), Sweden
- Position: Right wing
- Shot: Right
- Played for: Djurgårdens IF; Hammarby IF
- National team: Sweden
- NHL draft: 177th overall, 1974; Kansas City Scouts
- Playing career: 1971–1983

Sören Johansson (born July 11, 1954) is a retired Swedish ice hockey player. Johansson began playing hockey in Ösmo IF, where he played until the 1971–72 season when he moved to Hammarby IF. He only stayed in Hammarby for one season before moving to Stockholm rival Djurgårdens IF. Johansson became the first Djurgården player to be drafted in an NHL draft. This happened when he was drafted by the Kansas City Scouts in the 11th round, 177th overall, in the 1974 NHL amateur draft. He was also the third Swede to be drafted overall. Johansson played a total of nine seasons for Djurgården before returning to Hammarby for the 1981–82 season. He played there until his retirement from elite level hockey in Swedish in 1983.

== Regular season and playoffs ==
			Regular season					Playoffs
Season	Team	League	GP	G	A	Pts	PIM	GP	G	A	Pts	PIM
1972–73	Djurgårdens IF	Swe-1	14	7	0	7	0	12	6	1	7	2
1973–74	Djurgårdens IF	Swe-1	14	6	1	7	4	13	6	2	8	10
1974–75	Djurgårdens IF	Swe-1	30	12	6	18	6	6	7	4	11	0
1975–76	Djurgårdens IF	SEL	32	17	12	29	22	—	—	—	—	—
1976–77	Djurgårdens IF	SEL	31	26	22	48	4	9	5	7	12	2
1977–78	Djurgårdens IF	SEL	28	10	6	16	4	—	—	—	—	—
1978–79	Djurgårdens IF	SEL	29	7	3	10	4	6	2	0	2	0
1979–80	Djurgårdens IF	SEL	28	8	4	12	6	—	—	—	—	—
1980–81	Djurgårdens IF	SEL	26	8	1	9	2	—	—	—	—	—
1982–83	Hammarby IF	SEL	13	2	3	5	0	—	—	—	—	—
