= Wilf Paiement =

Canadian ice hockey player (born 1955)

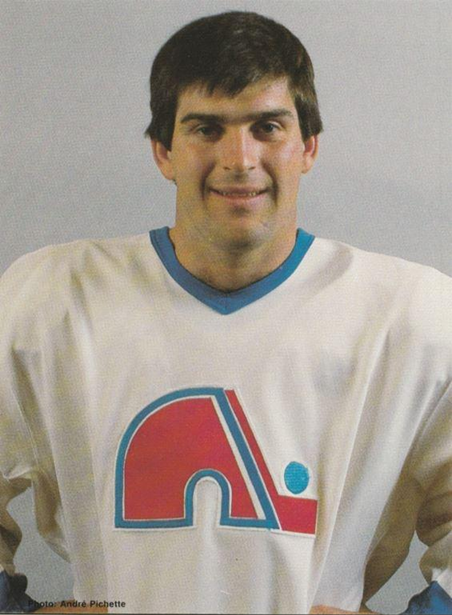
- Born: October 16, 1955 (age 71) Earlton, Ontario, Canada
- Height: 6 ft 1 in (185 cm)
- Weight: 210 lb (95 kg; 15 st 0 lb)
- Position: Right wing
- Shot: Right
- Played for: Kansas City Scouts; Colorado Rockies; Toronto Maple Leafs; Quebec Nordiques; New York Rangers; Buffalo Sabres; Pittsburgh Penguins
- National team: Canada
- NHL draft: 2nd overall, 1974; Kansas City Scouts
- Playing career: 1974–1988
Medal record
Representing Canada
World Championships
Bronze medal – third place	1978 Czechoslovakia

Wilfrid Paiement, Jr. (/peɪˈmɑːnt/; born October 16, 1955) is a Canadian former professional ice hockey right wing who played in the National Hockey League (NHL) from 1974 through 1988, for seven different NHL teams. He is the younger brother of former NHL hockey player Rosaire Paiement.

== Playing career ==
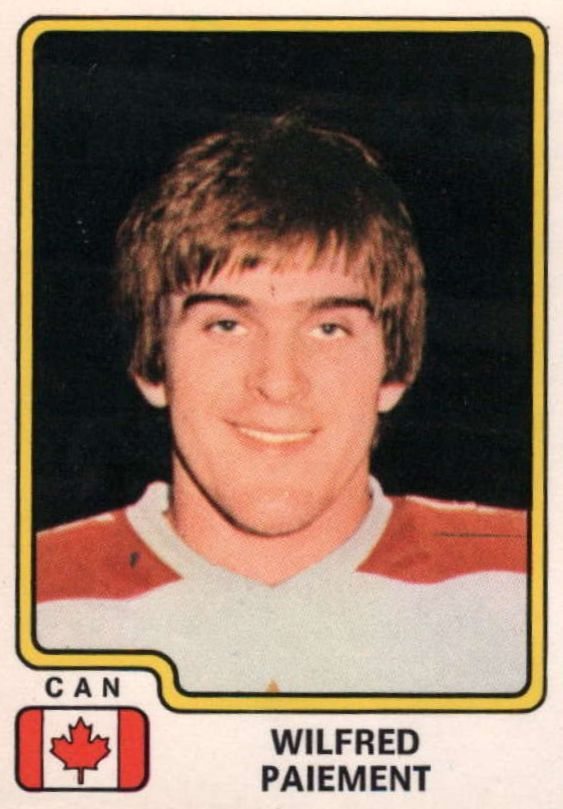
1979 card of Paiement

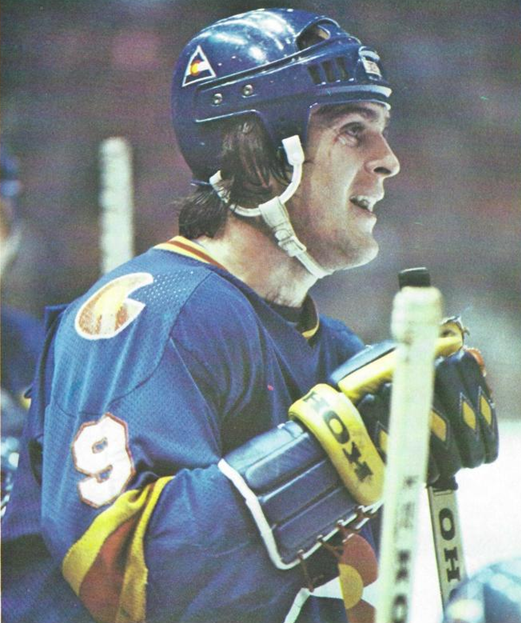
Paiement in 1979 for Colorado Rockies

Wilf Paiement was the second overall selection in the first round of the 1974 NHL amateur draft by the Kansas City Scouts. He played two seasons in Kansas City before the team moved to Colorado and became the Colorado Rockies.

Paiement was a member of the Canadian team that returned to the World Championship in Austria in 1977 after seven years of absence. During the tournament, frustrated by the lack of success, many members of Team Canada, including Paiement, resorted to violence. Paiement attacked Swedish player Lars-Erik Ericsson (who received a stick in the eye) on April 22, as well as Russian player Sergei Babinov (who was struck on the head by Paiement's hockey stick) after the score reached 8-0 in an 11-1 Team Canada loss."Wilf Paiement was the worst coward I ever saw on ice", said Swedish player Lars-Gunnar Lundberg, who played in the Swedish national team of 1977 in an interview in 2016.

On October 25, 1978, Paiement attacked Detroit Red Wings centre Dennis Polonich with his stick. The diminutive five-foot-six-inch Polonich was trash-talking with Paiement, when Paiement struck Polonich's across the face with a two-handed slash, which resulted in severe facial lacerations, a smashed nose that required extensive reconstructive surgery, and a severe concussion. Paiement received a match penalty. Initially suspended indefinitely Paiement had two league hearings before his sentence was reduced to 15 games, of which he had already served six. was given the second longest (at the time) suspension in NHL history - 15 games. Polonich sued, and was rewarded with a settlement of $850,000 on August 17, 1982.

Paiement was traded from the Rockies to the Toronto Maple Leafs along with Pat Hickey for Lanny McDonald and Joel Quenneville on December 29, 1979.

Paiement played in Toronto for the next three seasons before again being traded to the Quebec Nordiques for Miroslav Frycer and a 7th round pick in the 1982 NHL entry draft (Jeff Triano). After five seasons in Quebec, he was traded to the New York Rangers for Steve Patrick where he only played eight regular season games and 16 playoff games.

The Buffalo Sabres claimed Paiement in the 1986 waiver draft on October 6, 1986. He only played one season in Buffalo before rounding out his career with the Pittsburgh Penguins and finally, the Muskegon Lumberjacks of the International Hockey League (IHL) in 1987–88. At the time of his retirement, he was the last active player who had played for the Kansas City Scouts.

== Career statistics ==
=== Regular season and playoffs ===
			regular season					Playoffs
Season	Team	League	GP	G	A	Pts	PIM	GP	G	A	Pts	PIM
1971–72	Niagara Falls Flyers	OHA-Jr.	34	6	13	19	74	6	0	1	1	17
1972–73	St. Catharines Black Hawks	OHA-Jr.	61	18	27	45	173	—	—	—	—	—
1973–74	St. Catharines Black Hawks	OHA-Jr.	70	50	73	123	134	—	—	—	—	—
1973–74	St. Catharines Black Hawks	MC	—	—	—	—	—	3	1	0	1	17
1974–75	Kansas City Scouts	NHL	78	26	13	39	101	—	—	—	—	—
1975–76	Kansas City Scouts	NHL	57	21	22	43	121	—	—	—	—	—
1976–77	Colorado Rockies	NHL	78	41	40	81	101	—	—	—	—	—
1977–78	Colorado Rockies	NHL	80	31	56	87	114	2	0	0	0	7
1978–79	Colorado Rockies	NHL	65	24	36	60	80	—	—	—	—	—
1979–80	Colorado Rockies	NHL	34	10	16	26	41	—	—	—	—	—
1979–80	Toronto Maple Leafs	NHL	41	20	28	48	72	3	0	2	2	17
1980–81	Toronto Maple Leafs	NHL	77	40	57	97	145	3	0	0	0	2
1981–82	Toronto Maple Leafs	NHL	69	18	40	58	203	—	—	—	—	—
1981–82	Quebec Nordiques	NHL	8	7	6	13	18	14	6	6	12	28
1982–83	Quebec Nordiques	NHL	80	26	38	64	170	4	0	1	1	4
1983–84	Quebec Nordiques	NHL	80	39	37	76	121	9	3	1	4	24
1984–85	Quebec Nordiques	NHL	68	23	28	51	165	18	4	2	6	58
1985–86	Quebec Nordiques	NHL	44	7	12	19	145	—	—	—	—	—
1985–86	New York Rangers	NHL	8	1	6	7	13	16	5	5	10	45
1986–87	Buffalo Sabres	NHL	56	20	17	37	108	—	—	—	—	—
1987–88	Pittsburgh Penguins	NHL	23	2	6	8	39	—	—	—	—	—
1987–88	Muskegon Lumberjacks	IHL	28	17	18	35	52	5	0	2	2	15
NHL totals			946	356	458	814	1,757	69	18	17	35	185

=== International ===
Year	Team	Event	Result	GP	G	A	Pts	PIM
1977	Canada	WC	4th	10	5	5	10	32
1978	Canada	WC	3rd place, bronze medalist(s)	10	6	1	7	8
1979	Canada	WC	4th	8	3	3	6	6
Senior totals				28	14	9	23	46

== Achievements ==
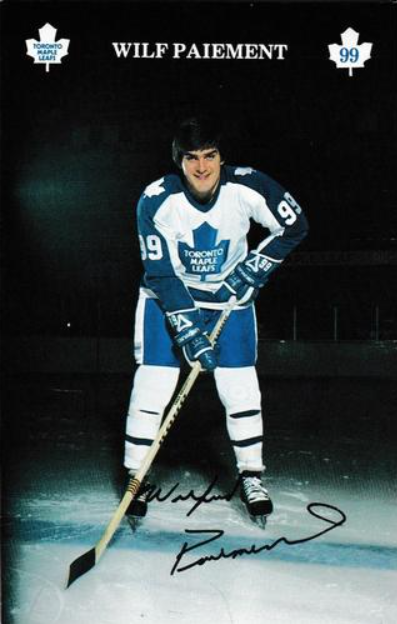
1981 photo of #99, Wilf Paiement for Toronto Maple Leafs

Wilf Paiement was the first player drafted by the Kansas City Scouts/Colorado Rockies/New Jersey Devils organization. He played in both the first games of the Scouts and the Rockies. Upon his retirement from the NHL, Paiement was the last active player to have played for the Scouts.

While Paiement was playing for the Toronto Maple Leafs he wore the number 99 for the 187 games he spent in Toronto, and was the last player other than Wayne Gretzky to wear that number, last wearing it on March 6, 1982 against the Montreal Canadiens. Referencing his time using the number 99, Paiement appeared in a commercial for the Canadian furniture store Leon's in 2008, in honour of their 99th anniversary. The commercial teased the appearance of Gretzky before revealing Paiement, who then said "What, you're expecting someone else?"

=== Awards ===
- OMJHL First All-Star Team – 1974
- WEC–A Best Forward – 1979 (Tied with Sergei Makarov)
- NHL All–Star Team – 1976, 1977, 1978

== Transactions ==
- July 15, 1976 – Transferred to Colorado after Kansas City franchise relocated.
- December 29, 1979 – Traded to Toronto by Colorado with Pat Hickey for Lanny McDonald and Joel Quenneville.
- March 9, 1982 – Traded to Quebec by Toronto for Miroslav Frycer and Quebec's 7th round choice (Jeff Triano) in 1982 Entry Draft.
- February 6, 1986 – Traded to NY Rangers by Quebec for Steve Patrick.
- October 6, 1986 – Claimed by Buffalo from NY Rangers in Waiver Draft.
- September 10, 1987 – Signed as a free agent by Pittsburgh.

Preceded by none	Kansas City Scouts first-round draft pick 1974	Succeeded by Barry Dean
Preceded by Simon Nolet	Colorado Rockies captain 1977–79	Succeeded by Gary Croteau
