= Simon Nolet =

Canadian ice hockey player (born 1941)

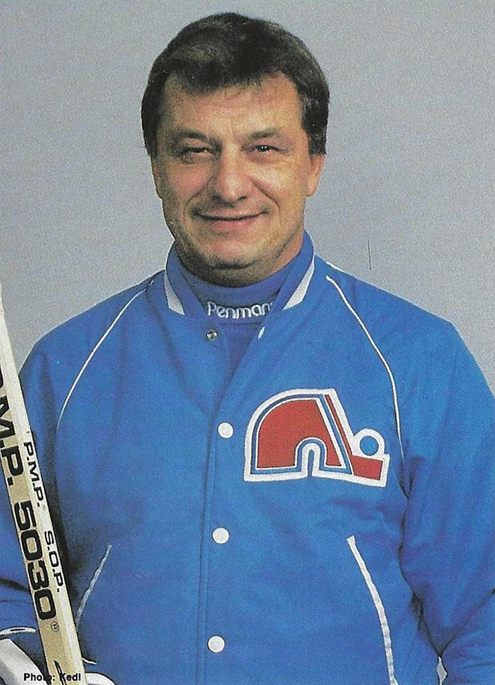
- Nolet in 1985
- Born: November 23, 1941 (age 84) Saint-Odilon-de-Cranbourne, Quebec, Canada
- Height: 5 ft 9 in (175 cm)
- Weight: 185 lb (84 kg; 13 st 3 lb)
- Position: Right wing
- Shot: Right
- Played for: Philadelphia Flyers; Kansas City Scouts; Pittsburgh Penguins; Colorado Rockies
- Playing career: 1962–1977

Simon Laurent Nolet (born November 23, 1941) is a Canadian former professional ice hockey player. He played ten seasons in the National Hockey League (NHL), most notably for the Philadelphia Flyers, with whom he won the Stanley Cup in 1973-74.

== Playing career ==
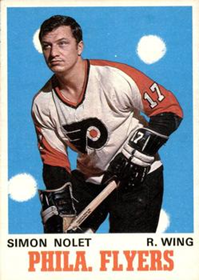
1970-71 card of Nolet for Philadelphia Flyers

Nolet started his junior career with the Quebec Citadelles of the Quebec Major Junior Hockey League and appeared in the Memorial Cup playoffs with them. In 1963-64 he scored 68 goals in 68 games with the Windsor, Nova Scotia Maple Leafs and helped them reach the Allan Cup Eastern semi-finals; he also scored ten goals in the playoffs. After sitting out most of the following season, he joined the Sherbrooke Castors, for whom he scored 21 goals in 15 games to lead them to the Allan Cup.

Immediately after that, Nolet signed with the Quebec Aces of the American Hockey League, and scored two goals and an assist in his professional debut. He starred with the Aces for most of the next five seasons; in 1967-68 he led the league in scoring with 44 goals and 52 assists for 96 points, and scored 15 points in ten playoff games, and he helped the Aces reach the Calder Cup finals that season and the following season as well.

The Philadelphia Flyers, who joined the NHL in 1967-68, purchased the Aces and the rights to its players, and Nolet made his NHL debut that season. He was a firm fixture by 1969–70, when he scored 22 goals in 56 games after his permanent promotion from Quebec. He showed strength in two-way play and penalty killing, and was known for his blazing speed and heavy slapshot. He earned a place in the All-Star Game in 1971–72.

Left exposed in the 1974 NHL Expansion Draft, Nolet was selected fifth overall by the Kansas City Scouts, and was named the team's first captain. He led a weak squad in scoring that first season and was Kansas City's sole representative in the All-Star Game. Halfway through the next year, he was dealt to the Pittsburgh Penguins, but was reacquired by the team in the 1976 offseason after it had moved to Denver and become the Colorado Rockies. He was named team captain again, and retired after the 1976–77 NHL season.

== Post-playing career ==
After his playing days, Nolet worked as a scout for the Quebec Nordiques of the World Hockey Association, and later served as an assistant coach for the club from 1982 to 1987. He later became and remains a scout in the Flyers' organization.

== Achievements and facts ==
- Won the John B. Sollenberger Trophy as the AHL's leading scorer in 1968.
- Named to the AHL Second All-Star Team in 1968.
- Played in the NHL All-Star Game in 1972 and 1975.
- Scored the first goal in Kansas City Scouts' history. (Note: This may also be considered the first goal in the New Jersey Devils' history, as the two franchises are the same, the Scouts having moved to Colorado in 1976 and to New Jersey in 1982.)
- Won the Stanley Cup with the Philadelphia Flyers in 1974.

== Career statistics ==
=== Regular season and playoffs ===
			Regular season					Playoffs
Season	Team	League	GP	G	A	Pts	PIM	GP	G	A	Pts	PIM
1960–61	Quebec Citadelles	QJHL	11	2	1	3	0	—	—	—	—	—
1961–62	Quebec Citadelles	QJHL	39	25	27	52	22	10	4	4	8	12
1961–62	Quebec Aces	AHL	1	0	0	0	2	—	—	—	—	—
1961–62	Quebec Citadelles	MC	—	—	—	—	—	9	2	4	6	2
1962–63	Windsor Maple Leafs	NSSHL	55	53	55	108	30	7	5	6	11	14
1962–63	Moncton Hawks	NSSHL	—	—	—	—	—	12	4	5	9	2
1963–64	Windsor Maple Leafs	NSSHL	68	68	65	133	19	8	2	6	8	4
1963–64	Windsor Maple Leafs	AC	—	—	—	—	—	11	10	8	18	8
1964–65	Quebec Aces	AHL	2	2	1	3	2	—	—	—	—	—
1964–65	Sherbrooke Castors	AC	—	—	—	—	—	15	21	14	35	4
1965–66	Quebec Aces	AHL	61	16	17	33	12	6	0	0	0	2
1966–67	Quebec Aces	AHL	66	32	24	56	28	5	1	4	5	4
1967–68	Philadelphia Flyers	NHL	4	0	0	0	2	1	0	0	0	0
1967–68	Quebec Aces	AHL	70	44	52	96	45	10	5	10	15	10
1968–69	Philadelphia Flyers	NHL	35	4	10	14	8	—	—	—	—	—
1968–69	Quebec Aces	AHL	33	11	21	32	28	15	5	3	8	28
1969–70	Philadelphia Flyers	NHL	56	22	22	44	36	—	—	—	—	—
1969–70	Quebec Aces	AHL	22	13	18	31	14	—	—	—	—	—
1970–71	Philadelphia Flyers	NHL	74	9	19	28	42	4	2	1	3	0
1971–72	Philadelphia Flyers	NHL	67	23	20	43	22	—	—	—	—	—
1972–73	Philadelphia Flyers	NHL	70	16	20	36	6	11	3	1	4	4
1973–74	Philadelphia Flyers	NHL	52	19	17	36	13	15	1	1	2	4
1974–75	Kansas City Scouts	NHL	72	26	32	58	30	—	—	—	—	—
1975–76	Kansas City Scouts	NHL	41	10	15	25	16	—	—	—	—	—
1975–76	Pittsburgh Penguins	NHL	39	9	8	17	2	3	0	0	0	0
1976–77	Colorado Rockies	NHL	52	12	19	31	10	—	—	—	—	—
AHL totals			255	118	133	251	131	36	11	17	28	44
NHL totals			562	150	182	332	187	34	6	3	9	8

== Notes ==
Preceded by Position created	Kansas City Scouts captain 1974–76	Succeeded by Guy Charron
Preceded by Kansas City Scouts captain Guy Charron	Colorado Rockies captain 1976–77	Succeeded by Wilf Paiement
