= Harry Dick =

Canadian ice hockey player

- Born: November 22, 1922 Port Colborne, Ontario, Canada
- Died: December 1, 2002 (aged 82) Ottawa, Kansas, U.S.
- Height: 5 ft 11 in (180 cm)
- Weight: 210 lb (95 kg; 15 st 0 lb)
- Position: Defence
- Shot: Left
- Played for: Chicago Black Hawks
- Playing career: 1939–1955

Harry Dick (November 22, 1922 – December 1, 2002) was a Canadian professional ice hockey player who played 12 games in the National Hockey League with the Chicago Black Hawks during the 1946–47 season. The rest of his career, which lasted from 1939 to 1955, was spent in various minor leagues. Dick was born in Port Colborne, Ontario.

== Career statistics ==
=== Regular season and playoffs ===
			Regular season					Playoffs
Season	Team	League	GP	G	A	Pts	PIM	GP	G	A	Pts	PIM
1938–39	Guelph Voyageurs	OHA-B	—	—	—	—	—	—	—	—	—	—
1938–39	Hershey Cubs	EAHL	6	0	0	0	0	—	—	—	—	—
1939–40	Guelph Biltmores	OHA	20	4	4	8	33	3	2	1	3	0
1939–40	Atlantic City Seagulls	EAHL	5	0	0	0	9	3	0	0	0	14
1940–41	Atlantic City Seagulls	EAHL	62	13	32	45	202	6	0	2	2	6
1941–42	Minneapolis Millers	AHA	48	8	14	22	91	—	—	—	—	—
1941–42	Cleveland Barons	AHL	3	0	0	0	12	—	—	—	—	—
1941–42	Philadelphia Rockets	AHL	2	0	0	0	4	—	—	—	—	—
1941–42	Atlantic City Seagulls	EAHL	—	—	—	—	—	2	2	1	3	2
1942–43	Cleveland Barons	AHL	2	0	0	0	0	—	—	—	—	—
1942–43	Toronto Army Daggers	OHA Sr	8	1	2	3	14	—	—	—	—	—
1942–43	Toronto People's Credit	TIHL	—	—	—	—	—	7	0	5	5	20
1943–44	Toronto Army Shamrocks	TIHL	31	12	23	35	109	4	0	3	3	6
1944–45	Toronto Army Shamrocks	TIHL	22	11	12	23	79	2	0	0	0	10
1944–45	Toronto Army Daggers	TNDHL	2	1	3	4	2	—	—	—	—	—
1944–45	Toronto Army Daggers	OHA Sr	4	1	0	1	0	—	—	—	—	—
1945–46	Kansas City Pla-Mors	USHL	51	17	19	36	87	12	1	2	3	34
1946–47	Kansas City Pla-Mors	USHL	40	6	14	20	80	11	4	3	7	12
1946–47	Chicago Black Hawks	NHL	12	0	1	1	12	—	—	—	—	—
1947–48	Tulsa Oilers	USHL	66	13	23	36	191	2	0	0	0	19
1948–49	Washington Lions	AHL	64	8	17	25	118	—	—	—	—	—
1949–50	Louisville Blades	USHL	68	14	32	46	137	—	—	—	—	—
1950–51	Buffalo Bisons	AHL	67	6	35	41	212	4	0	0	0	12
1951–52	Buffalo Bisons	AHL	54	3	22	25	119	2	0	0	0	5
1952–53	Vancouver Canucks	WHL	67	8	34	42	161	9	2	6	8	18
1953–54	Vancouver Canucks	WHL	54	4	15	19	116	12	3	2	5	45
1954–55	Vancouver Canucks	WHL	69	10	23	33	208	5	0	1	1	27
USHL totals			225	50	88	138	495	25	5	5	10	65
NHL totals			12	0	1	1	12	—	—	—	—	—
