= Guelph Biltmores =

Canadian junior ice hockey team (1939–1960)

- City: Guelph, Ontario
- League: Ontario Hockey Association
- Operated: 1939–1942; 1947–1960
- Home arena: Guelph Memorial Gardens
- Parent club: New York Rangers

Franchise history
- 1937–1939: Guelph Indians
- 1939–1942: Guelph Biltmores
- 1947–1960: Guelph Biltmores
- 1960–1963: Guelph Royals
- 1963–present: Kitchener Rangers

Championships
- Playoff championships: 1952 Memorial Cup

The Guelph Biltmores (formally the Guelph Biltmore Mad Hatters) were a Canadian junior ice hockey team in the Ontario Hockey Association (OHA) from 1939 to 1942, and 1947 to 1960. The team previously played as the Guelph Indians, before sponsorship by the Guelph Biltmore Hat Company. The Biltmores won the 1952 Memorial Cup as the national junior champions, and won the J. Ross Robertson Cup three times as OHA champions.

== History ==
=== 1937 to 1942 ===
The Guelph Indians began play during the 1937–38 OHA season and reached the playoffs finals for the J. Ross Robertson Cup, but lost to the Oshawa Generals. Following the 1938–39 OHA season, seven players from the Indians went to the Detroit Red Wings training camp.

Despite junior-aged players enlisting during World War II, Indians' team president Roy Mason planned to rebuild the team with physically bigger players, to compete with Oshawa Generals for the Memorial Cup. During the 1939–40 OHA season, the team became known as the Guelph Biltmores. They were coached by Norman Himes, and had only two returning players from the previous season. Due to natural ice in Guelph, the Biltmores played their first home game of the season at the Galt Arena Gardens. The team was sponsored by the Guelph Biltmore Hat Company, which rewarded any player scoring three or more goals in one game, the choice of a hat in the tradition of a hat-trick.

During the 1941–42 OHA season, Roy Mason reportedly wanted out of the hockey business, and had been losing money until the profits from the 1942 playoffs. Mason felt that as long as a natural ice rink arena stood in Guelph, a rink with an artificial ice surface would unlikely be built. Mason sold the Guelph Arena building in September 1942, for conversion to other purposes. The team ceased operating and its players dispersed for the 1942–43 season.

=== 1947 to 1952 ===
The Biltmores were resurrected for the 1947–48 OHA season following a six-year hiatus. Coached by Bobby Bauer, they operated as a farm team of the New York Rangers, and began training at the Waterloo Memorial Arena. The Biltmores returned to the OHA junior A division, despite not having a rink in Guelph, and played home games at the Galt Arena Gardens. Bauer resigned as coach in November 1947, and was succeeded by William "Jack" Sherry who played senior ice hockey with the Hamilton Tigers.

The Biltmores opened a new rink in Guelph during the following season, played their first home game at Guelph Memorial Gardens on November 19, 1948, versus the Toronto Marlboros. Ken Holmeshaw coached the Biltmores for the 1948–49 season, followed by Alf Pike for five seasons from 1949 to 1954.

=== 1952 Memorial Cup ===
The Memorial Cup trophy

The Biltmores placed second overall in the 1951–52 OHA season. Guelph the OHA record for single season scoring with 341 goals in a 54-game schedule, which was 34 goals more than the previous mark. Ken Laufman set on OHA record at the time with 139 points. Guelph won the OHA playoffs semifinal 4-games-to-2 versus the Toronto Marlboros, then won its second J. Ross Robertson Cup as OHA junior playoffs champions by defeating the St. Catharines Teepees in five games.

Moving into the national playoffs, Guelph won the Eastern Canada semifinal versus the Porcupine Combines in two consecutive games,
then won the Eastern Canada championship final in six games versus the Montreal Junior Canadiens. In the best-of-seven series for the 1952 Memorial Cup versus the Regina Pats, Guelph won the first game on home ice by a score of 8 to 2, then won three consecutive games at Maple Leaf Gardens to win the Memorial Cup.

=== 1952 to 1960 ===
Eddie Bush coached the Biltmores for six seasons from 1954 to 1960.

In May 1960, Madison Square Gardens Corporation who owned the New York Rangers of the National Hockey League (NHL) purchased the Biltmores as a farm team. Since "Biltmore" was considered a commercial name, the junior team was renamed. The Biltmores became the Guelph Royals for the 1960–61 OHA season.

== Players ==
=== Award winners ===
- 1951–52 – Ken Laufman, Eddie Powers Memorial Trophy (scoring champion–139 points)
- 1955–56 – Ron Howell, Red Tilson Trophy (most outstanding player)
- 1956–57 – Bill Sweeney, Eddie Powers Memorial Trophy (scoring champion–106 points)

=== Notable alumni ===
Five alumni from the Guelph Indians later played in the National Hockey League (NHL); including Eddie Bush, Lloyd Finkbeiner, John Holota, Alan Kuntz, and Joe Turner.

Four alumni of the Biltmores were inducted into the Hockey Hall of Fame; including Andy Bathgate (1949–1953), Rod Gilbert (1957–1960), Harry Howell (1949–1952), and Jean Ratelle (1958–1960). Alumnus Jim Connelly played for the Canada men's national ice hockey team at the 1960 Winter Olympics.

List of Biltmores who played in the NHL or World Hockey Association:

- Paul Andrea
- Andy Bathgate
- Frank Bathgate
- Danny Belisle
- Adam Brown
- William Chalmers
- Wally Clune
- Bob Cunningham
- Harry Dick
- Herb Dickenson
- Marc Dufour
- Lorne Ferguson
- Lou Fontinato
- Bruce Gamble
- Rod Gilbert
- Gerry Goyer
- Aldo Guidolin
- John Holota
- Harry Howell
- Ron Howell
- Al LeBrun
- Joe Levandoski
- Tony Licari
- Willie Marshall
- Clare Martin
- Shep Mayer
- Tom McCarthy
- Bill McCreary Sr.
- Sandy McGregor
- Roland McLenahan
- Mike McMahon Jr.
- Hillary Menard
- Ron Murphy
- Bob Plager
- Dean Prentice
- Jean Ratelle
- Leo Reise Jr.
- Doug Robinson
- Leon Rochefort
- Eddie Shack
- Glen Sonmor
- Ron Stewart
- Bill Sweeney
- Gilles Villemure

== Season-by-season results ==
Regular season and playoffs results:

- Guelph Indians (1937 to 1939):
- Guelph Biltmores (1939 to 1942):
- Guelph Biltmores (1947 to 1960):

Legend: GP = Games played, W = Wins, L = Losses, T = Ties, Pts = Points, GF = Goals for, GA = Goals against

Memorial Cup champions	OHA champions	OHA finalists

Season	Regular season									Playoffs
Season	GP	W	L	T	Pts	Pct	GF	GA	Finish	Playoffs
1937–38	16	11	5	0	22	0.688	60	52	2nd Group 2	Won group semifinal (Kitchener Greenshirts) 2–0; Won group final (Stratford Midgets) 3–2–2; Lost OHA final (Oshawa Generals) 3–0
1938–39	14	7	5	2	15	0.536	39	38	2nd Group 1	Lost quarterfinal (Toronto Young Rangers) 2–0
1939–40	20	10	8	2	22	0.550	88	61	4th OHA	Lost semifinal (Toronto Marlboros) 2–1
1940–41	16	11	5	0	22	0.688	85	75	2nd OHA (tie)	Lost semifinal (Toronto Marlboros) 3–2
1941–42	24	13	11	0	26	0.542	100	115	3rd OHA	Won quarterfinal (Toronto Marlboros) 2–0; Won semifinal (Toronto Young Rangers) 3–1; Lost OHA final (Oshawa Generals) 3–2
Team did not operate from 1942 to 1947
1947–48	36	12	23	1	25	0.347	144	168	8th OHA	Did not qualify
1948–49	48	20	26	2	42	0.438	169	221	7th OHA	Did not qualify
1949–50	48	26	18	4	56	0.583	189	157	4th OHA	Won quarterfinal (St. Catharines Teepees) 3–2; Won semifinal (Barrie Flyers) 3–1; Won OHA final (Windsor Spitfires) 4–2; Won Eastern Canada semifinal (Porcupine Combines) 4–1; Lost Eastern Canada championship final (Montreal Junior Canadiens) 4–2
1950–51	54	31	16	7	69	0.639	256	194	3rd OHA	Lost quarterfinal (St. Catharines Teepees) 3–2
1951–52	54	37	13	4	78	0.722	341	197	2nd OHA	Won semifinal (Toronto Marlboros) 4–2; Won OHA final (St. Catharines Teepees) 4–1; Won Eastern Canada semifinal (Porcupine Combines) 2–0; Won Eastern Canada championship final (Montreal Junior Canadiens) 4–2; Won 1952 Memorial Cup final (Regina Pats) 4–0
1952–53	56	22	32	2	46	0.411	212	244	7th OHA	Did not qualify
1953–54	59	26	31	2	54	0.458	248	268	6th OHA	Lost quarterfinal (Hamilton Tiger Cubs) 3–0
1954–55	49	32	15	2	66	0.673	211	158	2nd OHA	Won quarterfinal (Hamilton Tiger Cubs) 3–0; Lost semifinal (Toronto Marlboros) 3–0
1955–56	48	25	20	3	53	0.552	262	195	3rd OHA	Lost quarterfinal (Toronto St. Michael's Majors) 3–0
1956–57	52	37	12	3	77	0.740	237	143	1st OHA	Won semifinal (Toronto St. Michael's Majors) 4–0; Won OHA final (St. Catharines Teepees) 4–2; Lost Eastern Canada championship final (Ottawa-Hull Canadiens) 4–1–1
1957–58	52	13	34	5	31	0.298	137	223	7th OHA	Did not qualify
1958–59	54	23	18	13	59	0.546	220	206	3rd OHA	Won quarterfinal (Toronto Marlboros) 4–1; Lost semifinal (Peterborough Petes) 3–0–2
1959–60	48	19	21	8	46	0.479	197	185	6th OHA	Lost quarterfinal (St. Catharines Teepees) 4–1
