= Shep Mayer =

Canadian ice hockey player

- Born: September 11, 1923 Sturgeon Falls, Ontario, Canada
- Died: February 7, 2005 (aged 81)
- Height: 5 ft 8 in (173 cm)
- Weight: 180 lb (82 kg; 12 st 12 lb)
- Position: Right wing
- Shot: Right
- Played for: Toronto Maple Leafs
- Playing career: 1942–1951

Shephard Edwin Mayer (September 11, 1923 – February 7, 2005) was a Canadian ice hockey player who played two games in the National Hockey League with the Toronto Maple Leafs during the 1942–43 season. The rest of his career, which lasted from 1942 to 1951, was spent in various minor leagues. Mayer was born in Sturgeon Falls, Ontario.

== Career statistics ==
=== Regular season and playoffs ===
			Regular season					Playoffs
Season	Team	League	GP	G	A	Pts	PIM	GP	G	A	Pts	PIM
1940–41	Sturgeon Falls Indians	NOJHA	—	—	—	—	—	—	—	—	—	—
1941–42	Guelph Biltmores	OHA	23	9	8	17	34	11	8	7	15	20
1942–43	Toronto Maple Leafs	NHL	2	1	2	3	4	—	—	—	—	—
1942–43	Saskatoon RCAF	SSHL	16	6	3	9	27	3	2	0	2	4
1943–44	Camp Utopia Flyers	NBDHL	—	—	—	—	—	—	—	—	—	—
1944–45	North Bay RCAF	NOHA	—	14	3	17	—	—	—	—	—	—
1946–47	North Bay Rangers	NOHA	—	—	—	—	—	—	—	—	—	—
1947–48	Sault Ste. Marie Indians	NOHA	—	—	—	—	—	—	—	—	—	—
1948–49	Sault Ste. Marie Indians	NOHA	—	—	—	—	—	—	—	—	—	—
1949–50	Saskatoon Quakers	WCSHL	23	2	4	6	4	—	—	—	—	—
1949–50	Valleyfield Braves	QSHL	44	12	10	22	69	3	0	0	0	2
1950–51	Ottawa RCAF Flyers	ECSHL	34	12	9	21	20	7	5	8	13	14
NHL totals			2	1	2	3	4	—	—	—	—	—
