= Guy Charron =

Canadian ice hockey player and coach

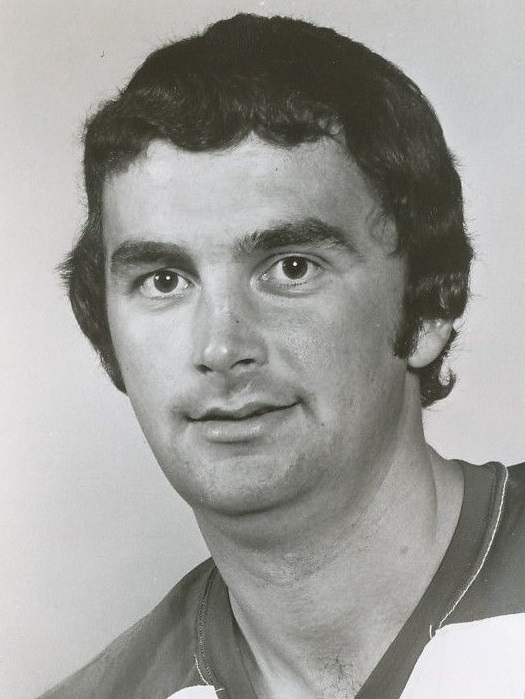
- Charron in 1976
- Born: January 24, 1949 (age 77) Verdun, Quebec, Canada
- Height: 5 ft 10 in (178 cm)
- Weight: 170 lb (77 kg; 12 st 2 lb)
- Position: Centre
- Shot: Left
- Played for: Montreal Canadiens; Detroit Red Wings; Kansas City Scouts; Washington Capitals
- National team: Canada
- Playing career: 1969–1983
Medal record
Representing Canada
Ice hockey
World Championships
Bronze medal – third place	1978 Prague

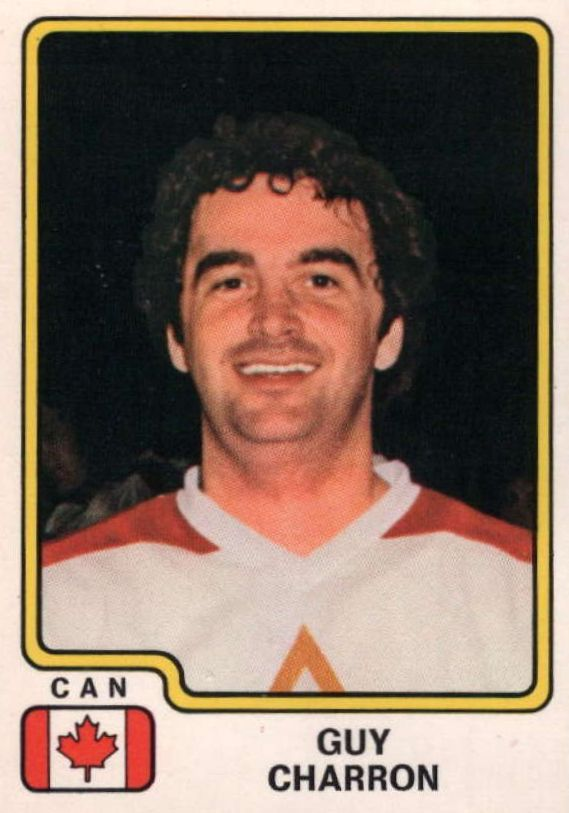
Guy Charron with the Canadian national team in 1979

Guy Joseph Jean Charron (born January 24, 1949) is a Canadian former professional ice hockey centre and coach. He played in the NHL from 1969 to 1981, and he was an assistant coach with five NHL teams from 1990 to 2008. He served brief stints as a head coach with the Calgary Flames in 1992 and with the Mighty Ducks of Anaheim during the 2000–01 season. He later served as the head coach of the WHL's Kamloops Blazers from 2010 to 2013. Charron briefly was the commissioner of the Thompson Okanagan Junior Lacrosse League in 2018.

== Playing career ==
Originally a product of the Montreal Canadiens' system, Charron played twenty games with the Canadiens before he was traded during the middle of the 1970–71 NHL season to the Detroit Red Wings in the monster deal that sent Frank Mahovlich to Montreal. He played with the Red Wings until he was traded to the expansion Kansas City Scouts in 1974. Prior to the 1976–77 NHL season, Charron signed as a free agent with the Washington Capitals, where he played until his retirement following the 1980–81 NHL season. He served as the Capitals' captain during the 1978–79 season. Despite playing in 734 NHL regular season games, he never appeared in a single playoff game, which was an NHL record until Olli Jokinen broke it early in the 2008–09 season. This record was then surpassed by Ron Hainsey and Jeff Skinner, but Jokinen, Hainsey and Skinner all subsequently participated in playoff games, so this record has reverted to Charron.

== Awards ==
- Won the 1999–2000 Commissioner's Trophy.

== Career statistics ==
=== Regular season and playoffs ===
			Regular season					Playoffs
Season	Team	League	GP	G	A	Pts	PIM	GP	G	A	Pts	PIM
1966–67	Verdun Maple Leafs	MMJHL	—	—	—	—	—	—	—	—	—	—
1966–67	Verdun Maple Leafs	M-Cup	—	—	—	—	—	4	0	1	1	4
1967–68	Verdun Maple Leafs	MMJHL	42	29	36	65	—	—	—	—	—	—
1967–68	Verdun Maple Leafs	M-Cup	—	—	—	—	—	21	14	9	23	6
1968–69	Montreal Junior Canadiens	OHA	50	27	27	54	12	14	11	15	26	6
1968–69	Montreal Junior Canadiens	M-Cup	—	—	—	—	—	8	7	5	12	4
1969–70	Montreal Canadiens	NHL	5	0	0	0	0	—	—	—	—	—
1969–70	Montreal Voyageurs	AHL	65	37	45	82	20	8	8	4	12	2
1970–71	Montreal Canadiens	NHL	15	2	2	4	2	—	—	—	—	—
1970–71	Detroit Red Wings	NHL	24	8	4	12	4	—	—	—	—	—
1970–71	Montreal Voyageurs	AHL	23	5	13	18	6	—	—	—	—	—
1971–72	Detroit Red Wings	NHL	64	9	16	25	14	—	—	—	—	—
1972–73	Detroit Red Wings	NHL	75	18	18	36	23	—	—	—	—	—
1973–74	Detroit Red Wings	NHL	76	25	30	55	10	—	—	—	—	—
1974–75	Detroit Red Wings	NHL	26	1	10	11	6	—	—	—	—	—
1974–75	Kansas City Scouts	NHL	51	13	29	42	21	—	—	—	—	—
1975–76	Kansas City Scouts	NHL	78	27	44	71	12	—	—	—	—	—
1976–77	Washington Capitals	NHL	80	36	46	82	10	—	—	—	—	—
1977–78	Washington Capitals	NHL	80	38	35	73	12	—	—	—	—	—
1978–79	Washington Capitals	NHL	80	28	42	70	24	—	—	—	—	—
1979–80	Washington Capitals	NHL	33	11	20	31	6	—	—	—	—	—
1980–81	Washington Capitals	NHL	47	5	13	18	2	—	—	—	—	—
1982–83	EHC Arosa	NDA	36	17	27	44	—	—	—	—	—	—
1982–83	New Haven Nighthawks	AHL	2	1	2	3	14	12	2	5	7	4
NHL totals			734	221	309	530	146	—	—	—	—	—

=== International ===
Year	Team	Event	GP	G	A	Pts	PIM
1977	Canada	WC	1	0	0	0	0
1978	Canada	WC	9	0	1	1	0
1979	Canada	WC	6	1	3	4	2
Senior totals			16	1	4	5	2

== Coaching statistics ==
=== NHL head coaching ===
Team	Year	Regular season							Postseason
Team	Year	G	W	L	T	OTL	Pts	Division rank	Result
Calgary Flames	1991–92	16	6	7	3	–	15	5th in Smythe	Missed playoffs
Mighty Ducks of Anaheim	2000–01	49	14	26	7	2	37	5th in Pacific	Missed playoffs
NHL Totals		65	20	33	10	2			

=== Minor league/assistant coaching ===
Season	Team	League	Type	G	W	L	T	OTL	Pct
1990–91	Calgary Flames	NHL	Assistant coach						
1991–92	Calgary Flames	NHL	Assistant coach^{1}						
1992–93	Calgary Flames	NHL	Assistant coach						
1993–94	Calgary Flames	NHL	Assistant coach						
1994–95	Calgary Flames	NHL	Assistant coach						
1995–96	New York Islanders	NHL	Assistant coach						
1998–99	Grand Rapids Griffins	IHL	Head coach	82	34	40	0	8	0.415
1999–00	Grand Rapids Griffins	IHL	Head coach	82	51	22	0	9	0.622
2001–02	Mighty Ducks of Anaheim	NHL	Assistant coach						
2002–03	Montreal Canadiens	NHL	Assistant coach						

^{1} Midseason replacement

Preceded by Simon Nolet	Kansas City Scouts captain 1976	Succeeded by Colorado Rockies captains Simon Nolet
Preceded by Yvon Labre	Washington Capitals captain 1978–79	Succeeded by Ryan Walter
Preceded by Doug Risebrough	Head coach of the Calgary Flames; 1992	Succeeded by Dave King
Preceded by Craig Hartsburg	Head coach of the Mighty Ducks of Anaheim; 2000–01	Succeeded by Bryan Murray
