= Lloyd Finkbeiner =

Canadian ice hockey player (1920–1998)

- Born: April 12, 1920 Guelph, Ontario, Canada
- Died: March 30, 1998 (aged 77)
- Height: 5 ft 10 in (178 cm)
- Weight: 175 lb (79 kg; 12 st 7 lb)
- Position: Left wing/Defence
- Shot: Left
- Played for: New York Americans
- Playing career: 1940–1957

Lloyd Cecil Finkbeiner (April 12, 1920 — March 30, 1998) was a Canadian ice hockey left winger. He played two games in the National Hockey League with the New York Americans during the 1940–41 season. The rest of his career, which lasted from 1940 to 1957, was spent in various minor leagues. Finkbeiner was born in Guelph, Ontario.

== Career statistics ==
=== Regular season and playoffs ===
			Regular season					Playoffs
Season	Team	League	GP	G	A	Pts	PIM	GP	G	A	Pts	PIM
1937–38	Guelph Indians	OHA	14	3	2	5	14	9	3	2	5	10
1937–38	Guelph Indians	M-Cup	—	—	—	—	—	3	0	0	0	2
1938–39	Guelph Indians	OHA	14	0	1	1	23	2	0	0	0	4
1939–40	Guelph Biltmores	OHA	19	2	3	5	63	3	0	0	0	6
1940–41	New York Americans	NHL	2	0	0	0	0	—	—	—	—	—
1940–41	Springfield Indians	AHL	34	3	5	8	8	—	—	—	—	—
1940–41	Atlantic City Seagulls	EAHL	6	0	0	0	0	—	—	—	—	—
1941–42	Camp Borden Army	NBSHL	4	8	5	13	4	—	—	—	—	—
1942–43	Toronto Army Daggers	OHA Sr	12	6	5	11	26	4	1	1	2	6
1942–43	Toronto CPR	TIHL	1	0	0	0	2	3	0	0	0	0
1942–43	Camp Borden Army	NSDHL	—	—	—	—	—	4	8	5	13	4
1943–44	Toronto Army Daggers	OHA Sr	1	0	0	0	0	—	—	—	—	—
1943–44	Toronto Army Shamrocks	TIHL	14	8	9	17	10	—	—	—	—	—
1944–45	Montreal Royals	QSHL	2	0	0	0	0	—	—	—	—	—
1944–45	Toronto Army Shamrocks	TIHL	1	0	0	0	0	—	—	—	—	—
1945–46	Buffalo Bisons	AHL	14	1	0	1	2	—	—	—	—	—
1945–46	Dallas Texans	USHL	42	13	8	21	28	—	—	—	—	—
1946–47	Dallas Texans	USHL	57	8	22	30	128	6	1	4	5	4
1947–48	Dallas Texans	USHL	66	9	18	27	78	—	—	—	—	—
1948–49	Houston Huskies	USHL	3	0	1	1	2	—	—	—	—	—
1948–49	Buffalo Bisons	AHL	63	7	14	21	95	—	—	—	—	—
1949–50	Buffalo Bisons	AHL	70	9	14	23	110	5	1	2	3	10
1950–51	Buffalo Bisons	AHL	64	6	20	26	85	4	1	1	2	10
1951–52	Buffalo Bisons	AHL	29	0	13	13	38	1	0	0	0	2
1951–52	Montreal Royals	QMHL	23	1	5	6	29	5	0	1	1	6
1952–53	Cincinnati Mohawks	IHL	48	5	26	31	87	9	2	5	7	32
1953–54	Stratford Indians	OHA Sr	52	9	21	30	100	3	1	0	1	12
1954–55	Stratford Indians	OHA Sr	50	2	16	18	103	7	1	6	7	8
1955–56	Stratford Indians	OHA Sr	48	6	21	27	60	6	2	1	3	6
1956–57	Strathroy Rockets	OHA Int	48	5	26	31	87	—	6	13	19	—
AHL totals			274	26	66	92	338	10	2	3	5	22
NHL totals			2	0	0	0	0	—	—	—	—	—
