= Herb Dickenson =

Canadian ice hockey player (1931–2019)

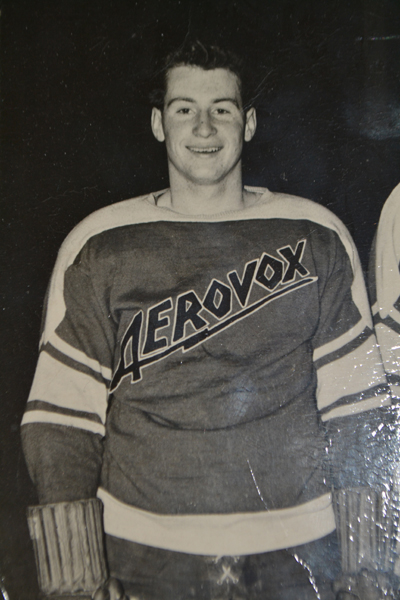
- Dickenson pictured circa 1948 with the Hamilton Aerovox of the OHA
- Born: June 11, 1931 Mount Hope, Ontario, Canada
- Died: November 12, 2019 (aged 88) Brantford, Ontario, Canada
- Height: 5 ft 11 in (180 cm)
- Weight: 175 lb (79 kg; 12 st 7 lb)
- Position: Winger
- Shot: Left
- Played for: New York Rangers
- Playing career: 1951–1953

John Herbert Dickenson (June 11, 1931 – November 12, 2019) was a Canadian ice hockey left winger. He played 48 games in the National Hockey League for the New York Rangers during the 1951–52 and 1952–53 seasons. His career ended early due to an eye injury during a game in 1952.

== Biography ==
Dickenson was born in Mount Hope, Ontario. He played in the Ontario Hockey Association with the Hamilton Aerovox in the 1948–49 hockey season, and the next two with the Guelph Biltmores. Scouted by the Rangers, he signed with them in 1951 and joined the Cincinnati Mohawks, their farm team. He played in 36 games for the Mohawks and scored 23 points. Dickenson also played 37 games for the Rangers in the 1951–52 season, scoring 14 goals and 13 assists for a total of 27 points.

In his second season with the Rangers, he sustained a career-ending eye injury at the age of 20 on November 5, 1952, in a game against the Toronto Maple Leafs when he was struck in the face by a shot. He was rushed to the hospital after being rendered unconscious and bleeding on the ice. He eventually lost sight in his right eye and never played another NHL game again. He later resided in Brantford, Ontario, where he died in 2019 at the age of 88.

== Career statistics ==
=== Regular season and playoffs ===
| | | | Regular season | | | | | Playoffs |
| Season | Team | League | GP | G | A | Pts | PIM | GP | G | A | Pts | PIM |
|---|---|---|---|---|---|---|---|---|---|---|---|---|
| 1949–50 | Guelph Biltmores | OHA | 48 | 24 | 22 | 46 | 43 | 15 | 15 | 3 | 18 | 6 |
| 1949–50 | Guelph Biltmores | M-Cup | — | — | — | — | — | 9 | 3 | 5 | 8 | 6 |
| 1950–51 | Guelph Biltmores | OHA | 49 | 27 | 36 | 63 | 44 | 4 | 1 | 3 | 4 | 4 |
| 1951–52 | New York Rangers | NHL | 37 | 14 | 13 | 27 | 8 | — | — | — | — | — |
| 1951–52 | Cincinnati Mohawks | AHL | 36 | 15 | 8 | 23 | 30 | — | — | — | — | — |
| 1952–53 | New York Rangers | NHL | 11 | 4 | 4 | 8 | 2 | — | — | — | — | — |
| NHL totals | | | 48 | 18 | 17 | 35 | 10 | — | — | — | — | — |
