= Gordon Kannegiesser =

Canadian ice hockey player (1945–2022)

- Born: December 21, 1945 North Bay, Ontario, Canada
- Died: March 1, 2022 (aged 76) North Bay, Ontario, Canada
- Height: 6 ft 0 in (183 cm)
- Weight: 190 lb (86 kg; 13 st 8 lb)
- Position: Defence
- Shot: Left
- Played for: St. Louis Blues; Houston Aeros; Indianapolis Racers
- Playing career: 1962–1975

Gordon Cameron Kannegiesser, Jr. (December 21, 1945 – March 1, 2022) was a Canadian professional ice hockey defenceman. Kannegiesser played 23 games in the National Hockey League for the St. Louis Blues during the 1967–68 and 1971–72 seasons, and 127 games in the World Hockey Association with the Houston Aeros and Indianapolis Racers from 1973 to 1975. Kannegiesser died from complications of ALS on March 1, 2022, at the age of 76. He was the brother of Sheldon Kannegiesser.

== Career statistics ==
=== Regular season and playoffs ===
			Regular season					Playoffs
Season	Team	League	GP	G	A	Pts	PIM	GP	G	A	Pts	PIM
1962–63	Guelph Royals	OHA	45	2	4	6	4	—	—	—	—	—
1963–64	Kitchener Rangers	OHA	56	5	7	12	39	—	—	—	—	—
1964–65	Kitchener Rangers	OHA	56	1	9	10	49	—	—	—	—	—
1965–66	Kitchener Rangers	OHA	46	4	10	14	53	19	3	8	11	34
1966–67	Des Moines Oak Leafs	IHL	72	7	30	37	56	7	3	2	5	4
1967–68	St. Louis Blues	NHL	19	0	1	1	13	—	—	—	—	—
1967–68	Kansas City Blues	CHL	44	5	9	14	29	7	0	1	1	8
1968–69	Kansas City Blues	CHL	72	9	18	27	74	4	1	0	1	4
1969–70	Kansas City Blues	CHL	68	1	12	13	68	—	—	—	—	—
1970–71	Seattle Totems	WHL	39	6	7	13	18	—	—	—	—	—
1970–71	Omaha Knights	CHL	—	—	—	—	—	5	2	1	3	0
1971–72	St. Louis Blues	NHL	4	0	0	0	2	—	—	—	—	—
1971–72	Denver Spurs	WHL	70	8	25	33	57	9	0	3	3	9
1972–73	Houston Aeros	WHA	45	0	10	10	37	9	0	1	1	11
1973–74	Houston Aeros	WHA	78	0	20	20	26	3	0	2	2	2
1974–75	Indianapolis Racers	WHA	4	1	4	5	4	—	—	—	—	—
1974–75	EHC Basel	NLB	19	2	6	8	34	—	—	—	—	—
WHA totals			127	1	34	35	67	12	0	3	3	13
NHL totals			23	0	1	1	15	—	—	—	—	—
