= Kansas City Scout =

Kansas City Scout is one of the United States' largest electronic active traffic management systems, designed to reduce traffic congestion and reduce road traffic incidents.

== History ==
It was created in 2000 as part of a bi-state initiative between the Missouri Department of Transportation and the Kansas Department of Transportation to provide this system for the Kansas City Metropolitan Area, which is in both Missouri and Kansas (the anchor city of Kansas City is in Missouri). The project's cost was $43 million. The Federal Highway Administration (FHWA) contributed 80-90 percent of the project cost, KDOT and MoDOT shared the remaining cost.

It was named after the iconic Kansas City statue, The Scout by Cyrus Edwin Dallin, that stands in Penn Valley Park, overlooking Downtown Kansas City.

== System design ==
The system employs a system of electronic boards placed on major highways throughout the metropolitan area that display traffic information whenever information needs to be displayed (due to an accident, lane closure, highway closure etc.), and the system also has cameras on those billboards to automatically detect traffic problems. While the system has extensive coverage of highways in the Kansas City Metropolitan Area it still has much more to cover.

A study was conducted to determine which highways or segments of highways have priority due to higher accident rates. Since the project began it has expanded from its original plans due it is success. Future plans are to extend coverage to I-635 and cover I-435 even more (especially in the northern areas of the metro) as well as other major city highways.
