= Bob Plager =

Canadian ice hockey player (1943–2021)

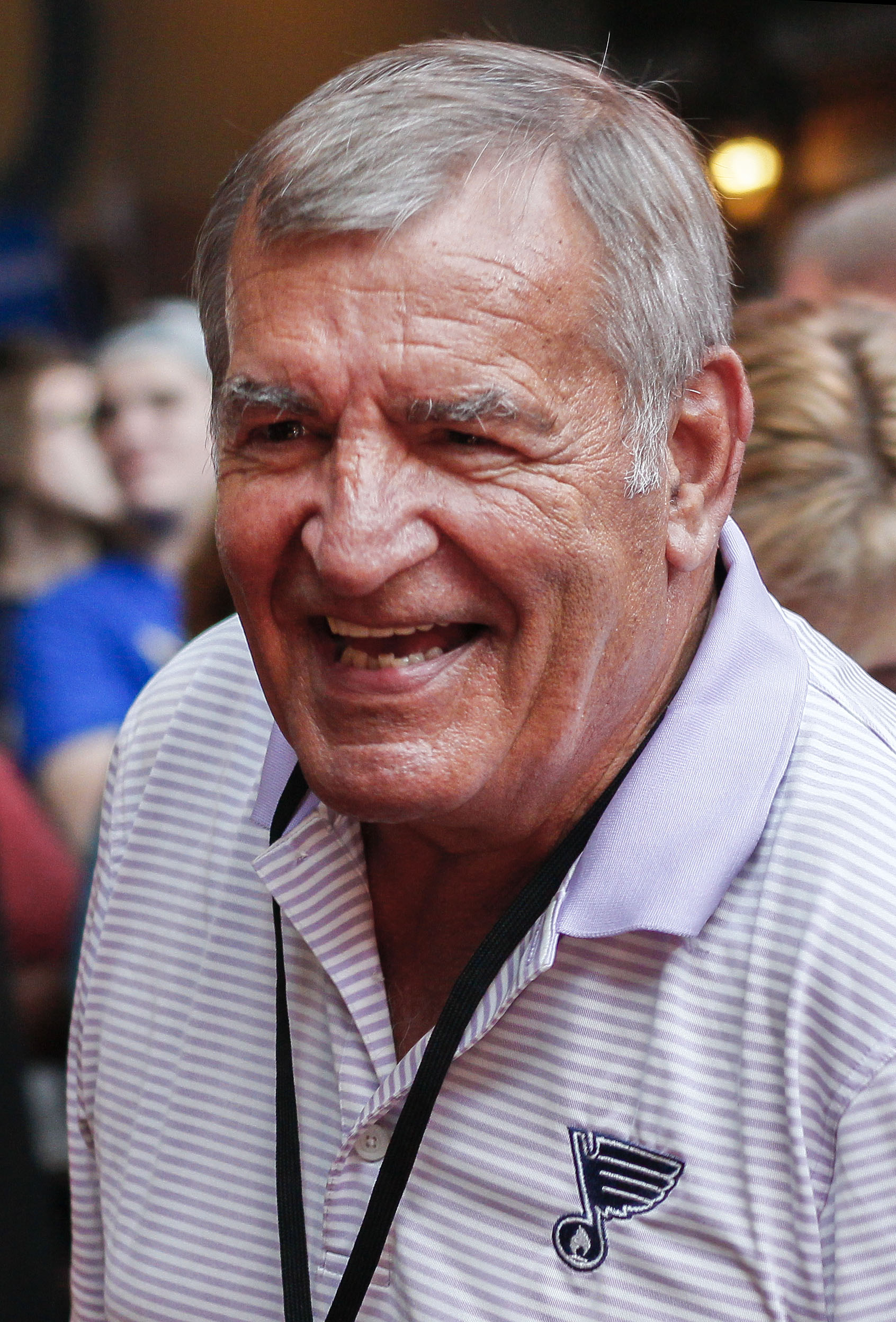
- Plager in 2014
- Born: March 11, 1943 Kirkland Lake, Ontario, Canada
- Died: March 24, 2021 (aged 78) St. Louis, Missouri, U.S.
- Height: 5 ft 11 in (180 cm)
- Weight: 195 lb (88 kg; 13 st 13 lb)
- Position: Defence
- Shot: Left
- Played for: New York Rangers; St. Louis Blues
- Playing career: 1962–1978

Robert Bryant Plager (March 11, 1943 – March 24, 2021) was a Canadian professional ice hockey defenceman who played in the National Hockey League (NHL) for 14 seasons from 1964 until 1978, primarily for the St. Louis Blues. Plager spent over half a century with the Blues organization in various capacities.

== Early career ==
Plager was born in Kirkland Lake, Ontario, on March 11, 1943. His father, Gus, worked as the chief official in the Northern Ontario Hockey Association. Plager played junior hockey with the Guelph Biltmores and the Guelph Royals. Known for his aggressive, highly physical play, he broke what was then the Ontario Hockey Association record for penalty minutes in a season in 1961–62. He subsequently signed a professional contract with the New York Rangers in 1964, but only played 29 games with this club over the next three years, spending most of his time with the minor league Baltimore Clippers. The NHL's expansion gave Plager his chance to become an NHL regular; he was traded to St. Louis with Gary Sabourin, Tim Ecclestone, and Gord Kannegiesser for Rod Seiling on June 6, 1967.

== Blues playing career ==
Plager was reunited with his brothers Bill and Barclay as all three took the ice for St. Louis Blues as the team started its existence with a hard-hitting, defensive-oriented squad that appeared in three straight Stanley Cup Finals. Plager earned a reputation as a bruising player with a devastating hip check. Off the ice, he was known as a prankster who was able to bond teammates through his lighthearted demeanor. Despite injuries, Plager was able to play 615 games over 11 years on the St. Louis blue line.

== Post-playing career ==
Plager retired from on-ice action in 1978 and took a job with the Blues front office. He is credited with developing the process of advanced scouting. During the 1990–91 season, he took over as head coach of the Peoria Rivermen, a Blues affiliate club. In his one-season behind the bench, he led the team to a Turner Cup championship and won the Commissioners' Trophy as coach of the year. During the 1992–93 season, he became the Blues' head coach, but, unhappy with his new role, he resigned after 11 games to return to his job as vice president of player development.

His jersey was retired on February 2, 2017, the seventh for a Blues player. He was either a player, coach or executive for nearly all of the Blues' existence until his death.

== Personal life ==
Plager's brothers, Bill and Barclay, also played in the NHL. All three of them played together with the St. Louis Blues from 1968 to 1972. Plager was a convert to Judaism.

== Death ==
Plager died of a "cardiac event" suffered while driving eastbound on Interstate 64, on March 24, 2021, leading to a two-vehicle collision. During a commemoration ceremony at Enterprise Center, organist Jeremy Boyer played "When The Blues Go Marching In" while Blues alumni carried his coffin out of Enterprise Center to be transported.

== Career statistics ==
=== Regular season and playoffs ===
			Regular season					Playoffs
Season	Team	League	GP	G	A	Pts	PIM	GP	G	A	Pts	PIM
1959–60	Guelph Biltmores	OHA	44	0	1	1	37	5	0	1	1	4
1960–61	Guelph Royals	OHA	43	3	12	15	99	14	3	8	11	73
1961–62	Guelph Royals	OHA	50	5	22	27	161	—	—	—	—	—
1961–62	Kitchener-Waterloo Beavers	EPHL	3	0	0	0	2	—	—	—	—	—
1962–63	Guelph Royals	OHA	45	11	28	39	97	—	—	—	—	—
1962–63	Baltimore Clippers	AHL	4	0	0	0	6	2	0	0	0	10
1963–64	St. Paul Rangers	CHL	61	13	35	48	158	8	3	6	9	21
1964–65	New York Rangers	NHL	10	0	0	0	18	—	—	—	—	—
1964–65	Vancouver Canucks	WHL	31	5	12	17	103	—	—	—	—	—
1964–65	Baltimore Clippers	AHL	19	2	12	14	27	5	0	0	0	6
1965–66	New York Rangers	NHL	18	0	5	5	22	—	—	—	—	—
1965–66	Minnesota Rangers	CHL	44	7	12	19	145	—	—	—	—	—
1966–67	New York Rangers	NHL	1	0	0	0	0	—	—	—	—	—
1966–67	Baltimore Clippers	AHL	63	3	16	19	169	9	0	5	5	15
1967–68	St. Louis Blues	NHL	53	2	5	7	86	18	1	2	3	69
1968–69	St. Louis Blues	NHL	32	0	7	7	43	9	0	4	4	47
1968–69	Kansas City Blues	CHL	5	1	3	4	16	—	—	—	—	—
1969–70	St. Louis Blues	NHL	64	3	11	14	113	16	0	3	3	46
1970–71	St. Louis Blues	NHL	70	1	19	20	114	6	0	2	2	4
1971–72	St. Louis Blues	NHL	50	4	7	11	81	11	1	4	5	5
1972–73	St. Louis Blues	NHL	77	2	31	33	107	5	0	2	2	2
1973–74	St. Louis Blues	NHL	61	3	10	13	48	—	—	—	—	—
1974–75	St. Louis Blues	NHL	73	1	14	15	53	2	0	0	0	20
1975–76	St. Louis Blues	NHL	63	3	8	11	90	3	0	0	0	2
1976–77	St. Louis Blues	NHL	54	1	9	10	23	4	0	0	0	0
1976–77	Kansas City Blues	CHL	4	0	2	2	15	—	—	—	—	—
1977–78	Salt Lake Golden Eagles	CHL	11	0	3	3	52	6	0	3	3	6
NHL totals			644	20	126	146	802	74	2	17	19	195

== Coaching record ==
Team	Year	Regular season						Postseason
Team	Year	G	W	L	T	Pts	Division rank	Result
St. Louis Blues	1992–93	11	4	6	1	(9)	(resigned)	—

== See also ==
- List of select Jewish ice hockey players

Preceded by Brian Sutter	Head coach of the St. Louis Blues; 1992	Succeeded by Bob Berry
