= Bill Plager =

Canadian ice hockey player

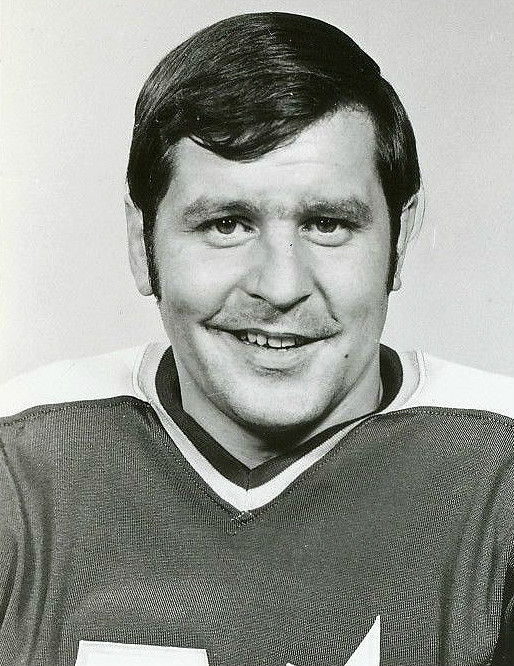
- Bill Plager 1973
- Born: July 6, 1945 Kirkland Lake, Ontario, Canada
- Died: January 3, 2016 (aged 70) Peterborough, Ontario, Canada
- Height: 5 ft 10 in (178 cm)
- Weight: 174 lb (79 kg; 12 st 6 lb)
- Position: Defence
- Shot: Right
- Played for: Minnesota North Stars; St. Louis Blues; Atlanta Flames
- Playing career: 1966–1977

William Ronald Plager (July 6, 1945 — January 3, 2016) was a Canadian professional ice hockey defenceman.

Plager started his National Hockey League (NHL) career with the Minnesota North Stars in 1967. He also played for the St. Louis Blues and Atlanta Flames. He left the NHL after the 1976 season.

== Personal life ==
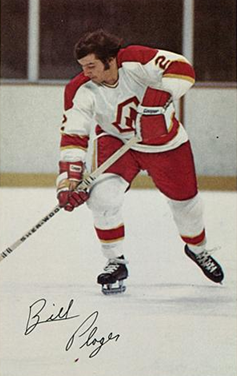
Bill Plager in 1972 for Atlanta Flames

Before playing in the National Hockey League, Plager played for the Peterborough Petes in Peterborough, Ontario, where he met his wife Donna Hickey. After retiring from the NHL, Plager returned to Peterborough with Donna, sons William Jr., Brett and daughter Dara. Plager is the brother of former NHL players/coaches Bob Plager and Barclay Plager. All three played together for four seasons with the St. Louis Blues.

Plager retired from hockey and became a manager at Quaker Oats Peterborough plant and was head coach of Atom B/C IceKats, girls hockey teams in the Peterborough Girls Hockey Association. He died on January 3, 2016.

== Career statistics ==
=== Regular season and playoffs ===
			Regular season					Playoffs
Season	Team	League	GP	G	A	Pts	PIM	GP	G	A	Pts	PIM
1962–63	Peterborough Petes	OHA	49	1	5	6	94	6	0	0	0	0
1963–64	Lachine Maroons	MMJHL	40	6	34	40	187	—	—	—	—	—
1963–64	Notre Dame Monarchs	M-Cup	—	—	—	—	—	4	0	1	1	20
1964–65	Peterborough Petes	OHA	27	4	3	7	77	12	0	3	3	31
1965–66	Peterborough Petes	OHA	47	1	21	22	190	6	0	1	1	14
1966–67	Houston Apollos	CHL	51	4	13	17	130	6	0	1	1	14
1967–68	Minnesota North Stars	NHL	32	0	3	3	30	12	0	2	2	8
1967–68	Memphis South Stars	CHL	30	0	7	7	51	—	—	—	—	—
1968–69	St. Louis Blues	NHL	2	0	0	0	2	4	0	0	0	4
1968–69	Kansas City Blues	CHL	35	1	4	5	66	4	0	1	1	6
1969–70	St. Louis Blues	NHL	24	1	4	5	30	3	0	0	0	0
1969–70	Buffalo Bisons	AHL	48	2	28	30	91	—	—	—	—	—
1970–71	St. Louis Blues	NHL	36	0	3	3	45	1	0	0	0	2
1970–71	Kansas City Blues	CHL	7	0	0	0	31	—	—	—	—	—
1971–72	St. Louis Blues	NHL	65	1	11	12	64	11	0	0	0	12
1971–72	Denver Spurs	WHL	8	0	5	5	18	—	—	—	—	—
1972–73	Atlanta Flames	NHL	76	2	11	13	92	—	—	—	—	—
1973–74	Minnesota North Stars	NHL	1	0	0	0	2	—	—	—	—	—
1973–74	New Haven Nighthawks	AHL	67	4	33	37	122	10	1	5	6	8
1974–75	Minnesota North Stars	NHL	7	0	0	0	8	—	—	—	—	—
1974–75	New Haven Nighthawks	AHL	64	6	27	33	101	16	0	4	4	23
1975–76	Minnesota North Stars	NHL	20	0	3	3	21	—	—	—	—	—
1975–76	New Haven Nighthawks	AHL	48	3	14	17	58	3	0	1	1	4
1976–77	Erie Blades	NAHL	64	5	25	30	65	—	—	—	—	—
NHL totals			263	4	35	39	294	31	0	2	2	26

== Transactions ==
- Traded to Minnesota by Montreal with the rights to Barrie Meissner and Leo Thiffault for Bryan Watson, June 6, 1967.
- Claimed by NY Rangers from Minnesota in Intra-League Draft, June 12, 1968.
- Traded to St. Louis by NY Rangers with Camille Henry and Robbie Irons for Don Caley and Wayne Rivers, June 13, 1968.
- Claimed by Atlanta from St. Louis in Expansion Draft, June 6, 1972.
- Claimed by Minnesota from Atlanta in Intra-League Draft, June 12, 1973.

== Awards and achievements ==
- AHL Second All-Star Team (1975)
