= Guelph Royals (ice hockey) =

Several Canadian ice hockey teams

- City: Guelph, Ontario
- Operated: 1908–09 (OPHL); 1920s (OHA) seniors 1960–1963 (OHA) juniors
- Home arena: Guelph Memorial Gardens (OHA juniors)
- Parent club: New York Rangers (OHA juniors)

Franchise history
- 1908–09: Guelph Royals
- c. 1920s: Guelph Royals
- 1937–1939: Guelph Indians
- 1939–1942 1947–1960: Guelph Biltmores
- 1960–1963: Guelph Royals
- 1963–present: Kitchener Rangers

The Guelph Royals name has been used for several hockey teams based in Guelph, Ontario. The most recent was a junior ice hockey team in the Ontario Hockey Association (OHA) from 1960 to 1963, that played home games at the Guelph Memorial Gardens. The junior Royals were a farm team for the New York Rangers of the National Hockey League.

Earlier versions of the Guelp Royals include a professional team during the 1908–09 Ontario Professional Hockey League season, and a senior ice hockey team in the OHA during the 1920s. The Royals namesake is the City of Guelph's nickname as the "Royal City."

== History ==
In 1960, Madison Square Gardens Corporation who owned the New York Rangers in the National Hockey League (NHL), purchased the Guelph Biltmores as a farm team. Since "Biltmore" was considered a commercial name, the junior team was renamed. The Royals were an early favourite to win the Ontario Hockey Association (OHA) junior division, with Emile Francis as head coach. Francis coached the Royals for the 1960–61 OHA season and the 1961–62 OHA season.

Guelph won the Hamilton Spectator Trophy during the 1960–61 OHA season, finishing 1st overall. The Royals' Rod Gilbert led the OHA in goals scored with 54, points scored with 103, and Jean Ratelle led the league in assists with 61. Gilbert won Eddie Powers Memorial Trophy with the most goals in the league, and was also awarded the Red Tilson Trophy as the most outstanding player. In the playoffs, the Royals lost in the league finals to the Toronto St. Michael's Majors, 4 games to 2 with a tie.

At the end of the 1962–63 OHA season, the team moved to nearby Kitchener, Ontario, becoming the Kitchener Rangers, taking the name of the NHL parent club.

== National Hockey League alumni ==
Twenty-one former Guelph Royals played in the NHL. Two alumni were elected to the Hockey Hall of Fame; Rod Gilbert and Jean Ratelle.

Seniors

- Leo Bourgeault
- Harry Connor

Juniors

- Paul Andrea
- Andy Brown
- Bob Cunningham
- Marc Dufour
- Trevor Fahey
- Sandy Fitzpatrick
- Rod Gilbert
- Duke Harris
- Bob Jones
- Gordon Kannegiesser
- Al LeBrun
- Randy Legge
- Mike McMahon Jr.
- Tom Miller
- Bob Plager
- Jean Ratelle
- Gary Sabourin
- George Standing
- Billy Taylor Jr.

== Season-by-season results ==
Regular season and playoffs results:

Legend: GP = Games played, W = Wins, L = Losses, T = Ties, Pts = Points, GF = Goals for, GA = Goals against

Memorial Cup champions	League champions	League finalists

Season	Regular season									Playoffs
Season	GP	W	L	T	Pts	Pct	GF	GA	Finish	Playoffs
1960–61	48	30	9	9	69	0.719	255	165	1st OHA	Won semifinal (Niagara Falls Flyers) 5–2; Lost OHA final (Toronto St. Michael's Majors) 4–2–1
1961–62	50	18	26	6	42	0.420	194	236	5th OHA	Did not qualify
1962–63	50	9	35	6	24	0.240	158	257	6th OHA	Did not qualify
