= The Scout (Kansas City, Missouri) =

Statue in Missouri, United States

Coordinates: 39.0757°N 94.5928°W

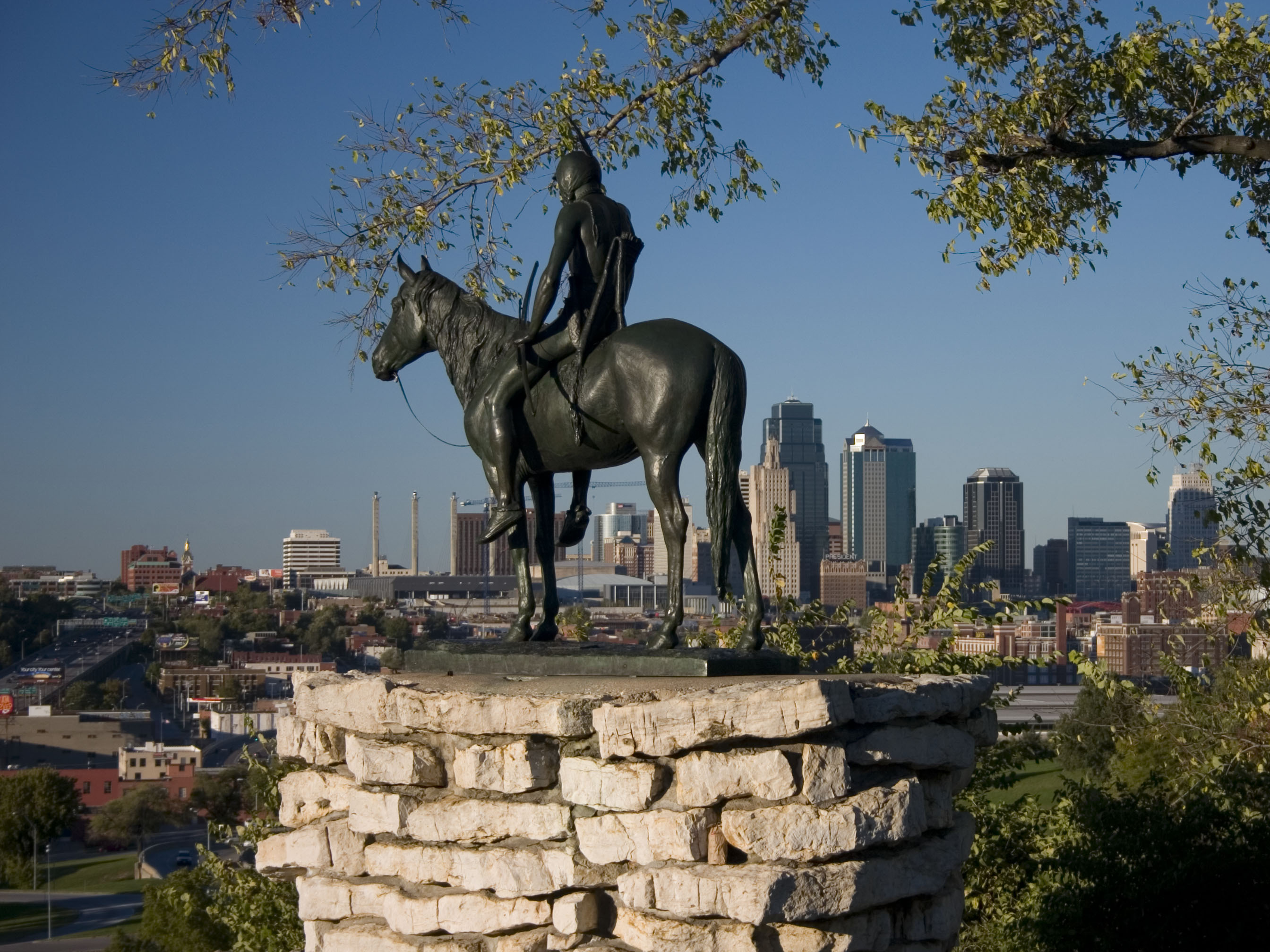
The Scout overlooking downtown Kansas City.

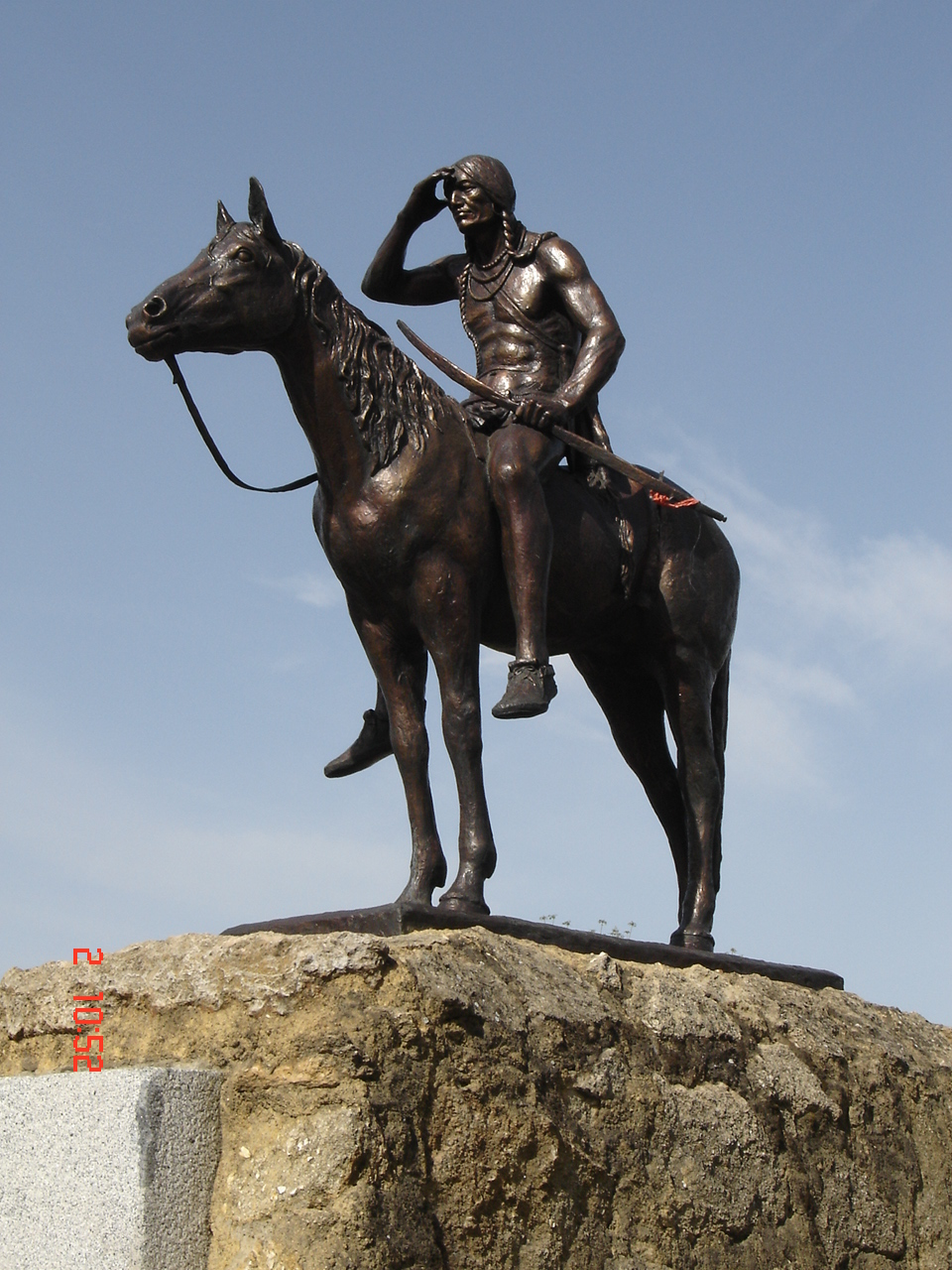
Half-size replica of The Scout in Seville, Spain.

The Scout is a famous statue by Cyrus E. Dallin in Kansas City, Missouri. It is more than 10 feet (3.0 m) tall, and depicts a Sioux Native American on horseback surveying the landscape. The Scout was conceived by Dallin in 1910, and exhibited at the 1915 Panama–Pacific International Exposition in San Francisco, where it won a gold medal. On its way back east, the statue was installed on a temporary basis in Penn Valley Park. The statue proved so popular that US$15,000 (equivalent to about $466,000 in 2024) in nickels and dimes was raised to purchase it through a campaign called "The Kids of Kansas City". The statue was dedicated in 1922 as a permanent memorial to local Native American tribes. It is located east of Southwest Trafficway in Penn Valley Park, which is south of downtown Kansas City.

Several area features have been named after the iconic statue, such as Kansas City Scout, which is the Kansas City metropolitan area's electronic traffic alert system. The statue inspired the name of the National Hockey League's Kansas City Scouts and was featured on the team's logo.

A half-size replica was given by Kansas City to its sister-city, Seville, Spain in 1992.
