= Louisville Blades =

The Louisville Blades were a minor league professional ice hockey team that played in the International Hockey League during the 1948–49 season, and the United States Hockey League during the 1949–50 season. The Blades were based in Louisville, Kentucky and played at the Louisville Gardens.

== Season-by-season results ==
Season	Games	Won	Lost	Tied	Points	Winning %	Goals for	Goals against	Standing
1948–49	32	21	5	6	48	0.750	192	127	1st, South
1949–50	70	22	39	9	53	0.379	256	333	6th, USHL

== See also ==
- Sports in Louisville, Kentucky
