= Barry Dean (ice hockey) =

Canadian ice hockey player (born 1955)

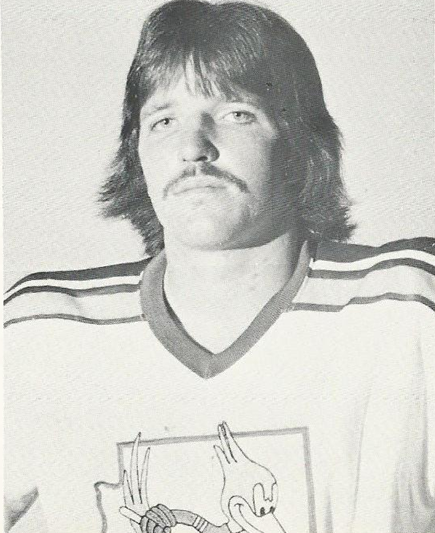
- Born: February 26, 1955 (age 71) Maple Creek, Saskatchewan, Canada
- Height: 6 ft 01 in (185 cm)
- Weight: 195 lb (88 kg; 13 st 13 lb)
- Position: Left wing
- Shot: Left
- Played for: Phoenix Roadrunners; Colorado Rockies; Philadelphia Flyers
- NHL draft: 2nd overall, 1975; Kansas City Scouts
- WHA draft: 6th overall, 1975; Edmonton Oilers
- Playing career: 1975–1982

Barry James Dean (born February 26, 1955) is a Canadian former professional ice hockey player. Dean was drafted second overall in the 1975 NHL Amateur Draft by the Kansas City Scouts. He played 71 World Hockey Association (WHA) games for the Phoenix Roadrunners, as well as 165 National Hockey League (NHL) games for the Colorado Rockies and the Philadelphia Flyers, and retired in 1982.

== Personal life ==
Barry Dean is the uncle of former NHL player Zack Smith.

== Career statistics ==
=== Regular season and playoffs ===
| | | | Regular season | | | | | Playoffs |
| Season | Team | League | GP | G | A | Pts | PIM | GP | G | A | Pts | PIM |
|---|---|---|---|---|---|---|---|---|---|---|---|---|
| 1971–72 | Saskatoon Olympics | SJHL | — | — | — | — | — | — | — | — | — | — |
| 1971–72 | Medicine Hat Tigers | WCHL | 26 | 2 | 5 | 7 | 46 | 7 | 0 | 0 | 0 | 2 |
| 1972–73 | Medicine Hat Tigers | WCHL | 68 | 23 | 30 | 53 | 208 | 17 | 6 | 10 | 16 | 35 |
| 1973–74 | Medicine Hat Tigers | WCHL | 66 | 23 | 73 | 96 | 213 | 6 | 4 | 8 | 12 | 13 |
| 1974–75 | Medicine Hat Tigers | WCHL | 64 | 40 | 75 | 115 | 159 | 5 | 4 | 6 | 10 | 28 |
| 1975–76 | Phoenix Roadrunners | WHA | 71 | 9 | 25 | 34 | 110 | — | — | — | — | — |
| 1976–77 | Colorado Rockies | NHL | 79 | 14 | 25 | 39 | 92 | — | — | — | — | — |
| 1977–78 | Philadelphia Flyers | NHL | 56 | 7 | 18 | 25 | 34 | — | — | — | — | — |
| 1978–79 | Maine Mariners | AHL | 36 | 18 | 17 | 35 | 94 | 5 | 2 | 1 | 3 | 0 |
| 1978–79 | Philadelphia Flyers | NHL | 30 | 4 | 13 | 17 | 20 | — | — | — | — | — |
| 1979–80 | Maine Mariners | AHL | 77 | 23 | 26 | 49 | 106 | 12 | 8 | 9 | 17 | 21 |
| 1980–81 | Wichita Wind | CHL | 30 | 14 | 14 | 28 | 54 | — | — | — | — | — |
| 1981–82 | Fredericton Express | AHL | 28 | 2 | 17 | 19 | 10 | — | — | — | — | — |
| WHA totals | | | 71 | 9 | 25 | 34 | 110 | — | — | — | — | — |
| NHL totals | | | 165 | 25 | 56 | 81 | 146 | — | — | — | — | — |

== Awards ==
- WCHL All-Star Team – 1975

| Preceded by Wilf Paiement | Kansas City Scouts first-round draft pick 1975 | Succeeded by Paul Gardner |
| Preceded by Gary Soetaert | Edmonton Oilers first-round draft pick 1975 | Succeeded by Blair Chapman |
