= Kansas City Scouts =

Former National Hockey League team (1974–1976)

- Founded: 1974
- History: Kansas City Scouts; 1974–1976; Colorado Rockies; 1976–1982; New Jersey Devils; 1982–present
- Home arena: Kemper Arena
- City: Kansas City, Missouri
- Team colors: Blue, red, yellow, white
- Stanley Cups: 0
- Conference championships: 0
- Division championships: 0

The Kansas City Scouts were a professional ice hockey team in the National Hockey League (NHL) from 1974 to 1976. In 1976, the franchise relocated to Denver and became the Colorado Rockies. In 1982, the Rockies relocated to New Jersey where they have since been known as the New Jersey Devils.

== History ==
In 1974, the NHL ended its first significant expansion period, that had started in 1967, by adding teams in Kansas City, Missouri, and Washington, D.C. Kansas City Hockey Associates, led by managing general partner Edwin G. Thompson, originally consisted of 22 investors. It was awarded a franchise on June 8, 1972. Kansas City Hockey Associates was one of four groups that applied for the franchise. Missouri Lt. Governor William Morris (former owner of the Central Hockey League's Kansas City Blues), Stan Glazer and Arthur Rhoades headed up the other three potential ownership groups.

Kemper Arena was constructed to host the team's home games. Kansas City had been the home of several minor league ice hockey teams through the years. The Scouts shared Kemper Arena with the Kansas City Kings (the Kings were officially the Kansas City–Omaha Kings from 1972 to 1975) of the National Basketball Association (NBA). The arrival of the Scouts and Washington Capitals resulted in the NHL creating four divisions and renaming the conferences, and the Scouts were placed in the Smythe Division of the Campbell Conference with Missouri's other NHL franchise, the St. Louis Blues.

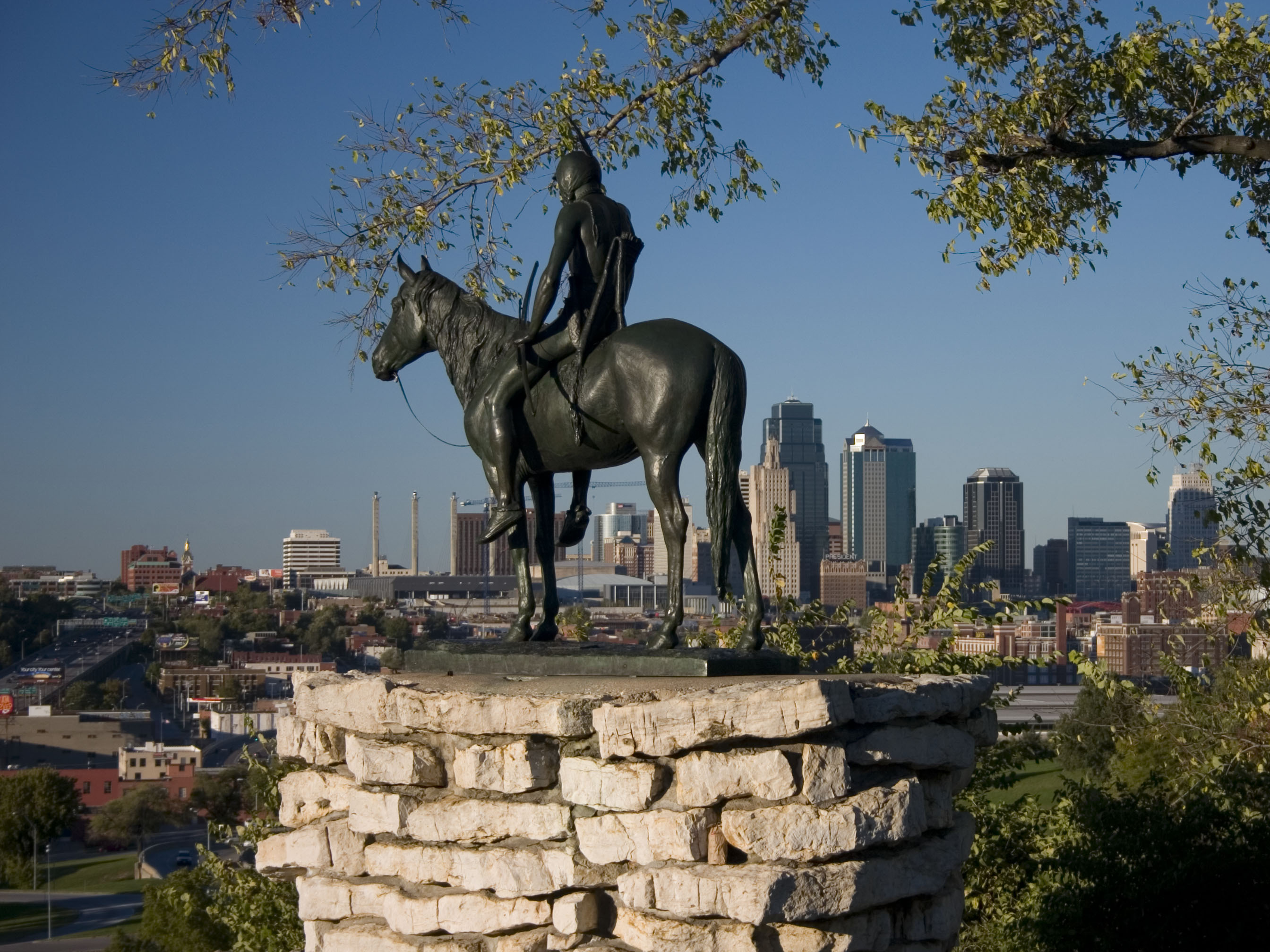
The Kansas City Scout statue inspired the franchise's name

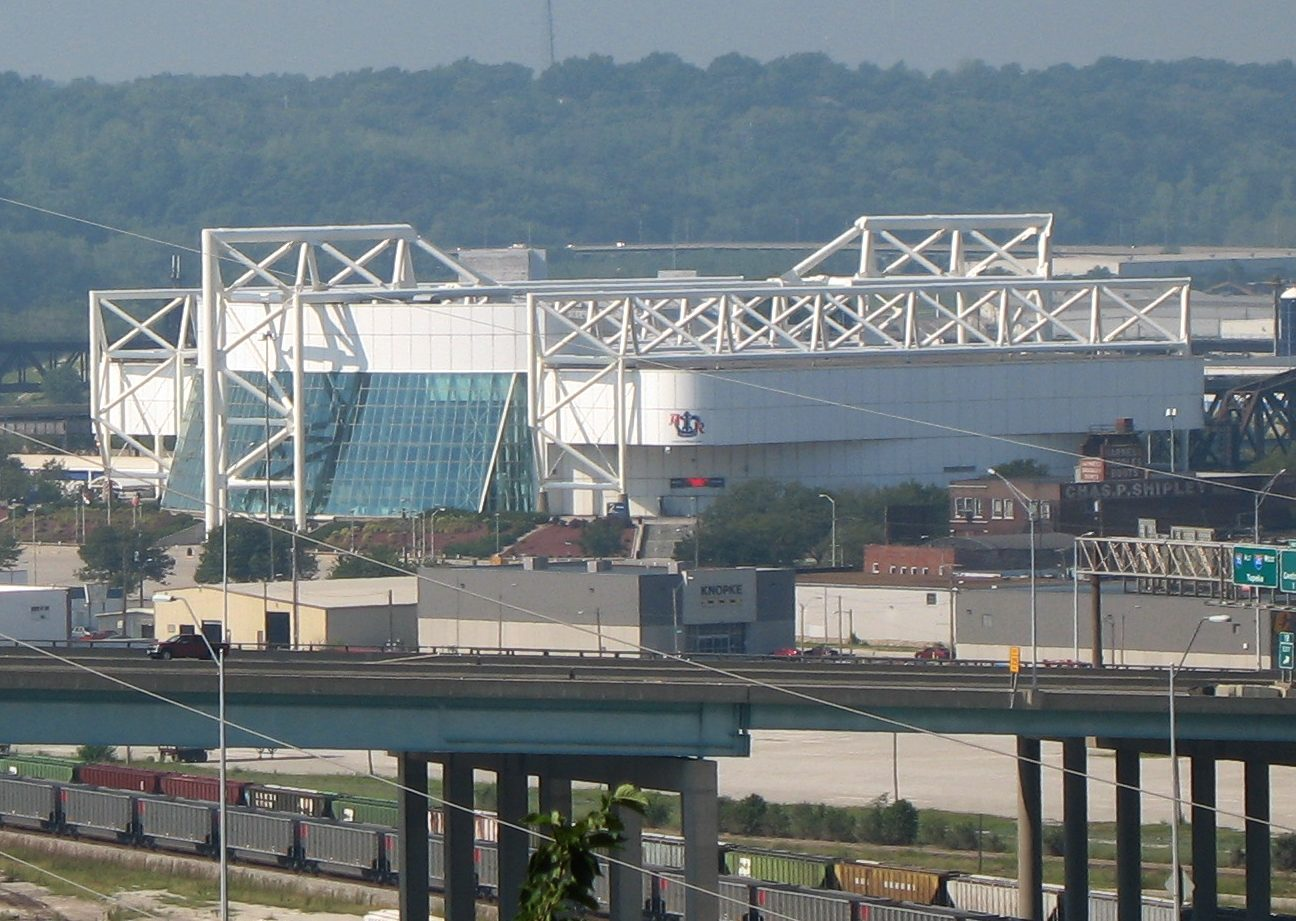
Kemper Arena served as the Scouts' home arena

The owners of the new Kansas City franchise originally wanted to call their team the "Kansas City Mohawks", since the Kansas City metropolitan area includes portions of Missouri and Kansas. The name would have combined Missouri's postal abbreviation (MO) and the Kansas nickname of "Jayhawkers". However, the Chicago Black Hawks objected because of the similarity of "Mohawks" to their own name.

The team then held a contest for people to name the new team. The name "Scouts" was chosen, named after The Scout which is located in Penn Valley Park and overlooks downtown. The iconic statue was featured on the team's logo. The club's logo was designed by lettering artist Gary Sartain of Kansas City-based Hallmark Cards in 1973 on a free-lance basis. Sartain's daughter, Sheila Snyder, told author Troy Treasure in 2018 her mother indicated Sartain was paid $2,000.

On October 9, 1974, the Scouts took the ice for the first time, at Maple Leaf Gardens in Toronto, and lost 6–2 to the Maple Leafs. Team captain Simon Nolet scored the first-ever goal in team history. To allow construction to be completed on Kemper Arena, the Scouts played their first eight games on the road, where they lost seven and tied one. The Scouts made their home debut on November 2, losing to the Black Hawks 4–3. Chicago's Ivan Boldirev scored the first NHL goal at Kemper Arena three minutes into the game. Rookie first-round draft selection Wilf Paiement scored the first Scouts goal. The following day the team's first victory came against the Washington Capitals by a score of 5–4 at Capital Centre in Landover, Maryland. Peter McDuffe was the winning goaltender for Kansas City. Like many other expansion teams, the Scouts performed poorly garnering only 41 points with a record of 15–54–11 in their inaugural season, though this would be the better result of their two-season history.

The 1975–76 season started out with some promise. Near the midway point of the season, the team was competing for a playoff spot, with a 3–1 win over the California Golden Seals on December 28, 1975 placing them just one point behind the St. Louis Blues and a playoff position in the weak Smythe Division. However, the Scouts went into free fall for their remaining 44 games. After going winless from December 30 to February 4 (0–14–2), they finally won a game, against the Capitals on February 7, before going 0–21–6 for the rest of the season. The Scouts' second-half crash left them with a season result of 12–56–12 and 36 points. At the time, this was the 10th worst record (in terms of points percentage) in NHL history and the fourth-worst since the end of the Original Six era. It is still the worst record in Scouts/Rockies/Devils franchise history.

The last four games the Scouts ever played took place in Japan. Following the conclusion of the 1975–76 regular season, Kansas City and Washington participated in an exhibition series with the first two games played in Sapporo (site of the 1972 Winter Olympics), the third and fourth in Tokyo at Yoyogi National Gymnasium, site of the swimming and diving competition at the 1964 Summer Olympics. The Capitals won the first three contests. On April 18, 1976, the Scouts defeated Washington 4–2. Thus, Kansas City won its final game but it did not count in the NHL standings.

In their two seasons, the Scouts went through three coaches – Bep Guidolin, Sid Abel (three-game interim stint), and Eddie Bush. Guidolin resigned during the 1975–76 season following a dispute with management over player personnel.

The team had two captains, Simon Nolet and Guy Charron. Steve Durbano led the league in penalty minutes during the 1975–76 season. The franchise failed to make the playoffs in either season in Kansas City and won only 27 of 160 games, including a 7–66–7 mark away from home.

With the 1972 startup of the rival World Hockey Association (WHA) resulting in a combined 32 teams between the NHL and the WHA, the talent available to stock the new teams in Kansas City and Washington was stretched thin. In their first season, the Capitals set an NHL record for futility, losing 67 of 80 games, and winning only one on the road. The Scouts fared only marginally better (losing 56 games), and the 1974 NHL expansion was widely seen as having been a mistake. Attendance tailed off so much that the National Hockey League Players' Association (NHLPA) wondered if the Scouts would make payroll.

=== Relocation to Denver ===
Poor performance on the ice was not the only problem for the Scouts. They suffered from inflated player costs, undercapitalized ownership, an economic downturn in the Midwest, and weak attendance. The Scouts averaged just 8,218 per game during their two years in the 17,000-seat Kemper Arena (at a time when the league average was approximately 13,000). The team's 37 investors, buried in debt, mounted a season-ticket drive to raise more revenue. When only 2,000 more season tickets were sold, they concluded that the Scouts were not a viable venture and opted to sell. The Capitals were far worse on the ice, having won only 19 games in their first two years to the Scouts' 27. However, Capitals owner Abe Pollin had the financing and the patience to absorb the typical struggles of a 1970s expansion team.

A Denver-based group led by oilman Jack Vickers expressed interest in buying the club and moving it to Denver for the 1976-77 season. Denver had been sounded out as a potential home for the Scouts as early as the fall of 1975. Indeed, discussions were advanced enough to force the WHA's Denver Spurs to move to Ottawa in midseason, where they only played seven games as the Ottawa Civics before folding.

A local group, according to author Troy Treasure, led by Scouts' limited partners Gene Novorr and George Shore, was also interested in buying the team. However, when the NHL informed the Scouts' owners that they would be on the hook of over a million dollars in expansion and territorial fees (owed the St. Louis Blues) if they did not sell to Vickers, they reluctantly did so on July 26, 1976.

After just two seasons in Kansas City, the club moved to Denver as the Colorado Rockies. They played six NHL seasons in Denver, but were barely competitive; they only made the playoffs once. They relocated to East Rutherford, New Jersey, and became the New Jersey Devils starting in the 1982–83 season. It was in New Jersey where they would finally achieve a measure of stability, managing their first winning record and second playoff berth in 1988, their 14th season overall and sixth in New Jersey.

The last Scouts player on the Rockies' active roster was goaltender Bill McKenzie, who last played for the franchise on April 4, 1980. The last active Scouts player in the NHL was the Scouts' first-ever drafted player, Wilf Paiement, who retired in 1988.

The Scouts and the California Golden Seals, who moved to become the Cleveland Barons the same year, were the first NHL teams to relocate since the 1934–35 season.

== Legacy ==
Following the departure of the Scouts, Kansas City became a minor league town again, most notably with the Kansas City Blades operating from 1990 to 2001 in the International Hockey League. The Kansas City Mavericks of the ECHL play in Independence, 10 mi (16 km) east of downtown Kansas City.

To this day, the Devils make almost no mention of their past as the Scouts or Rockies; the Devils' media guide and the history sections of the Devils' website do not acknowledge any captains, coaches or general managers prior to the move to New Jersey. However, inside of the Prudential Center, the Devils home rink, there is a mural on the second floor that shows the former arenas of the Rockies and Scouts, along with Devils' original (1982–2007) New Jersey home, the Brendan Byrne Arena.

For the 2022–23 season, the New Jersey Devils unveiled a new Scouts-themed "Reverse Retro" jersey. The white sweater had red, yellow and blue piping, similar to the uniforms worn in Kansas City, albeit the Scouts logo was replaced with the Devils logo. Additionally, that same season, the Devils celebrated their 40th anniversary. Unlike with prior anniversaries (10th, 20th, 30th), the Devils treated it as "40 years in Jersey", acknowledging the franchise existed prior to 1982.

== Season-by-season record ==
The Scouts had a 27–110–23 regular season record and did not qualify for the playoffs.

== Players and personnel ==
=== Team captains ===
- Simon Nolet, 1974–1976
- Guy Charron, 1976

=== Head coaches ===
- Bep Guidolin, 1974–1976
- Sid Abel, 1976
- Eddie Bush, 1976

=== General managers ===
- Sid Abel, 1974–1976
- Baz Bastien, 1976

=== First-round draft picks ===
- 1974: Wilf Paiement (2nd overall)
- 1975: Barry Dean (2nd overall)
- 1976: Paul Gardner (11th overall)

== Broadcasters ==
Dick Carlson was the radio play-by-play announcer in 1974–75 on WDAF (AM) with simulcasts on KBMA-TV (now KSHB-TV) beginning in 1975–76. Following the Scouts departure, Carlson called Major League Baseball games for the Kansas City Royals and Cincinnati Reds. He died in 2004, age 60.

In 1974–75, Gene Osborn was the sole television play-by-play announcer, also on KBMA, with analysis provided by Bill Grigsby. KBMA was an independent station distributed in the Midwest via cable television, including the cities of Des Moines, Iowa and Wichita, Kansas.

== See also ==
- 1974 NHL expansion draft
- List of defunct NHL teams
