= DeRochmont House =

Historic house in Massachusetts, United States

- U.S. National Register of Historic Places
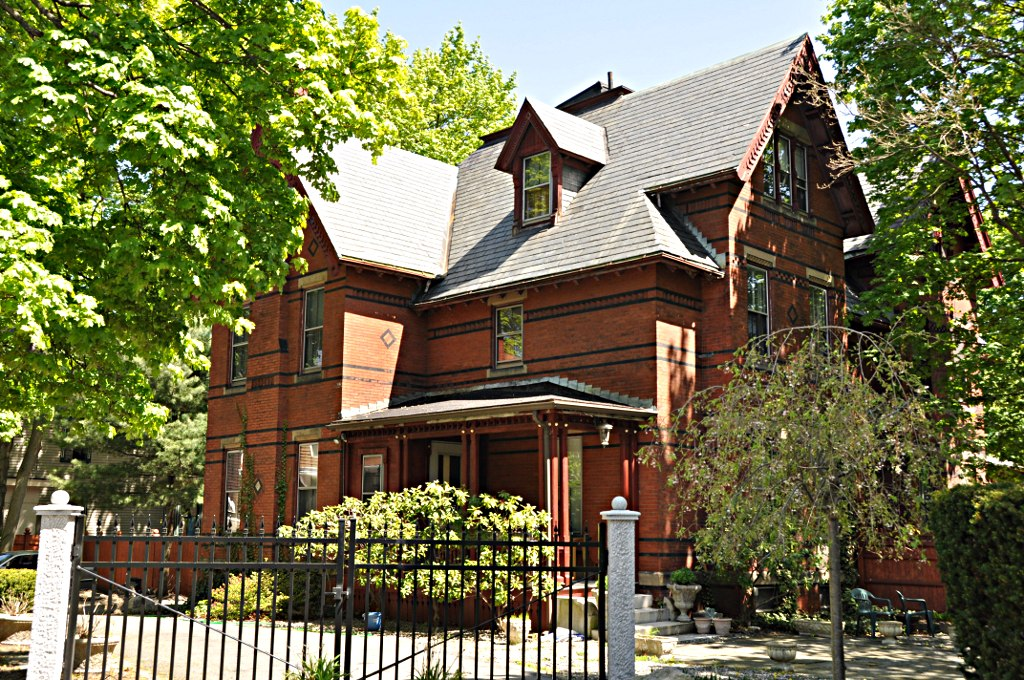

- Location within Massachusetts Location within the United States
- Location: 2–4 Rangeley Road, Winchester, Massachusetts
- Coordinates: 42°27′3″N 71°8′23″W
- Built: 1876
- Architect: George Dutton Rand
- Architectural style: Queen Anne
- MPS: Winchester MRA
- NRHP reference No.: 89000642
- Added to NRHP: July 5, 1989

The DeRochmont House is a historic house in Winchester, Massachusetts. Built about 1876 by a Maine lumber magnate as part of the exclusive Rangeley Estate, it is one three examples of Panel Brick Queen Anne architecture in the town. The house was listed on the National Register of Historic Places in 1989.

== Description and history ==
The Rangeley Estate subdivision was a high-end residential development, located southwest of Winchester center on the west side of the railroad tracks. The land was purchased by David Skilling, a lumber businessman from Maine, and developed by him into an exclusive gated development (its wall and a gate are still visible on Church Street near this house). This house was built by him for the DeRochmont family, about whom nothing is known.

The house stands at the southeast corner of Church Street and Rangeley Road, at the northern end of Skilling's development. It is a 2 1/2-story brick house, with a complex roofline typical of the Queen Anne period. The walls are made of polychromatic (principally red and black) brick, with some sandstone trim elements. Gable ends are decorated with vergeboard, and window lintels are sandstone carved with floral motifs on the first floor, and with sawtooth motif on the second. Eastlake-style posts demarcate windows in the gables, and support the small entry porch on the west side.

== See also ==
- Webster Childs House, another Skilling brick house
- Samuel Elder House, the third Skilling brick house
- National Register of Historic Places listings in Winchester, Massachusetts
