= Grover House =

Grover House may refer to:

- Henry Grover House, Winchester, Massachusetts, listed on the NRHP in Middlesex County
- Grover House (Middletown, New Jersey), listed on the NRHP in Monmouth County
- George Washington Grover House, Galveston, Texas, listed on the NRHP in Galveston County
- Groverhaus, an internet meme that originated on the Something Awful forums
