= Wyman House =

Wyman House may refer to:

- Fowle-Reed-Wyman House, Arlington, Massachusetts
- Francis Wyman House, Burlington, Massachusetts
- Otis-Wyman House, Somverville, Massachusetts
- George Wyman House, Winchester, Massachusetts
- Wyman-Rye Farmstead, Clinton, Wisconsin, listed on the National Register of Historic Places
