= United States Post Office–Winchester Main =

- US Post Office–Winchester Main
- U.S. National Register of Historic Places
- U.S. Historic district – Contributing property
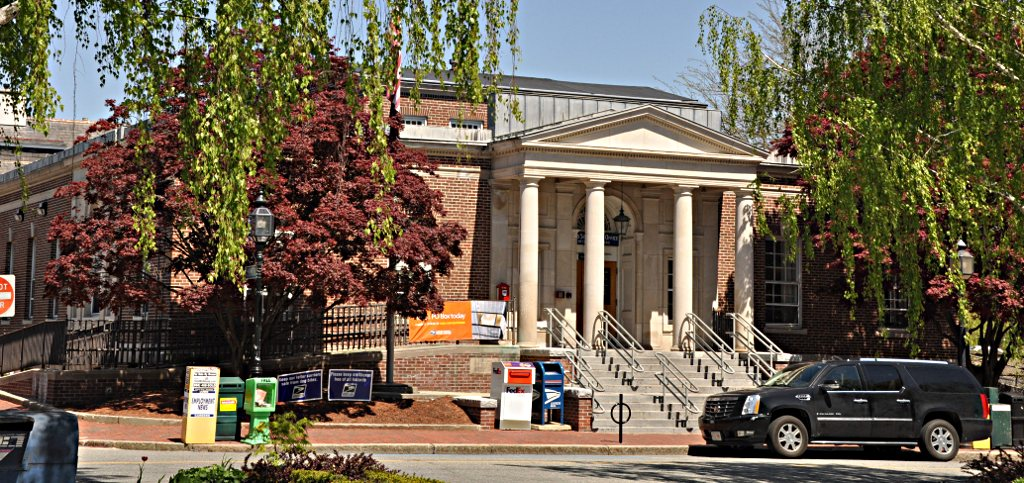

- Location within Massachusetts Location within the United States
- Location: Winchester, Massachusetts
- Coordinates: 42°27′05″N 71°08′13″W
- Built: 1927
- Architect: Office of the Supervising Architect under James A. Wetmore; Curley, John P.
- Architectural style: Classical Revival
- Part of: Winchester Center Historic District (ID86002943)
- NRHP reference No.: 87001773

Significant dates
- Added to NRHP: October 19, 1987
- Designated CP: November 21, 1986

The US Post Office—Winchester Main is a historic post office at 48 Waterfield Road in Winchester, Massachusetts. The single-story Classical Revival brick building was built in 1927 and 1928 by John P. Curley for the United States Postal Service. The building features neo-Classical temple fronts on its three principal facades, with a more elaborate projecting instance on the long south-facing facade, where the main entrance is located. The cornice has a simple dentil moulding in limestone; the roof is flat, but there is a raised clerestory section in the center.

The building was listed on the National Register of Historic Places in 1987, and included in the Winchester Center Historic District in 1986.

== See also ==
- National Register of Historic Places listings in Winchester, Massachusetts
- List of United States post offices
