= O. W. Gardner House =

Historic house in Massachusetts, United States

- U.S. National Register of Historic Places
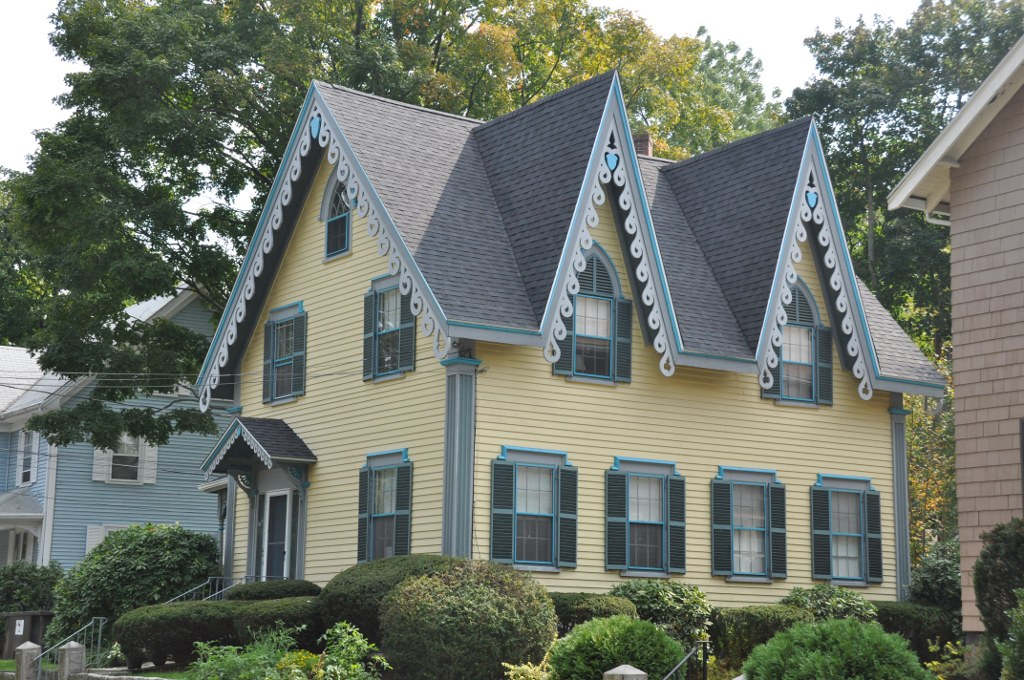

- Location within Massachusetts Location within the United States
- Location: 5 Myrtle Street, Winchester, Massachusetts
- Coordinates: 42°27′8″N 71°7′59″W
- Built: 1840
- Architectural style: Gothic Revival
- MPS: Winchester MRA
- NRHP reference No.: 89000791
- Added to NRHP: July 5, 1989

The O. W. Gardner House is a historic house in Winchester, Massachusetts. The 1 1/2-story wood-frame house was built c. 1840 by Oliver W. Gardner, and was originally one of a pair built in the area (the other is no longer extant). It is one of Winchester's finest examples of Gothic Revival architecture, with elaborate scroll-sawn vergeboard in its steep gables, which also occurs in miniature on the gable-roofed portico that shelters the door. It has windows topped by label mouldings, and some windows are topped by a Gothic pointed-arch. The corner boards have elaborately grooved pilasters.

The house was listed on the National Register of Historic Places in 1989.

== See also ==
- National Register of Historic Places listings in Winchester, Massachusetts
