= Dike-Orne House =

Historic house in Massachusetts, United States

- U.S. National Register of Historic Places
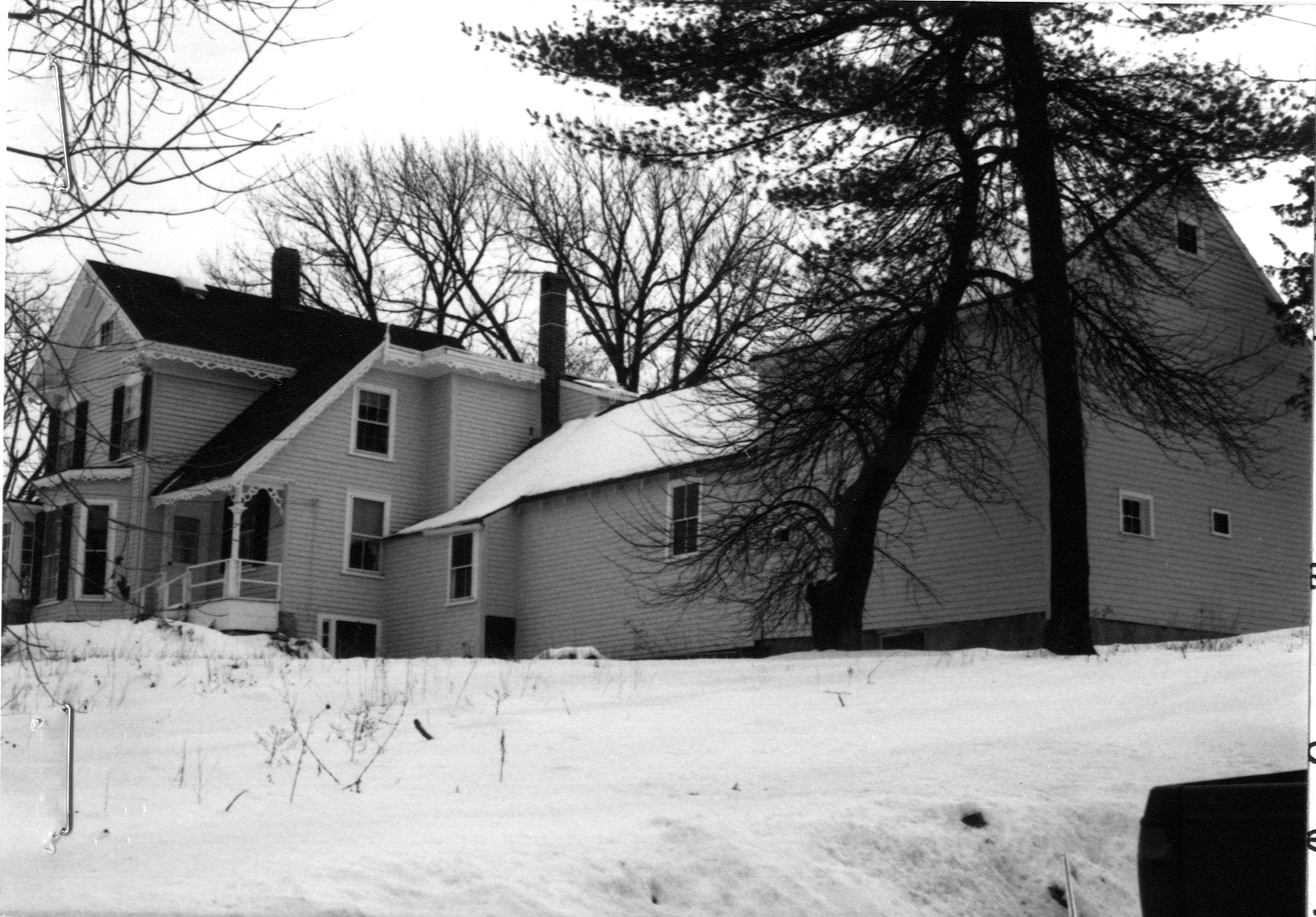
- c. 1987 photo

- Location within Massachusetts Location within the United States
- Location: 257 Forest St., Winchester, Massachusetts
- Coordinates: 42°28′23″N 71°6′47″W
- Area: 3.3 acres (1.3 ha)
- Built: 1850
- Architectural style: Gothic Revival
- MPS: Winchester MRA
- NRHP reference No.: 89000621
- Added to NRHP: July 5, 1989

The Dike-Orne House was a historic house in Winchester, Massachusetts. A typical rambling New England farmstead, this c. 1850 house was one of the few mid-19th century farmhouses to survive into the late 20th century. The house was added to the National Register of Historic Places in 1989. It was demolished in 1996.

== Description and history ==
The Dike-Orne House stood on the east side of Forest Street, a short way south of the town line between Winchester and Stoneham. It was a rambling 2 1/2-story wood-frame structure, with an attached shed and carriage barn. It was unusual for its Gothic Revival styling, which is relatively rare in Winchester. Vergeboard decoration typical of the style decorated its gables and roof line.

The house was probably built about 1850 by Lyman Dike, and predates the final settlement of the Stoneham-Winchester line, which was settled in 1864 in part through the efforts of Dike. In 1865 it was sold to Joshua Orne, a shoemaker working for a factory in Stoneham. Later owners were also recorded as having non-farm trades, indicative that these workers were engaging in farming on the side to supplement their primary income.

== See also ==
- National Register of Historic Places listings in Winchester, Massachusetts
