= Hutchinson-Blood House =

Historic house in Massachusetts, United States

- U.S. National Register of Historic Places
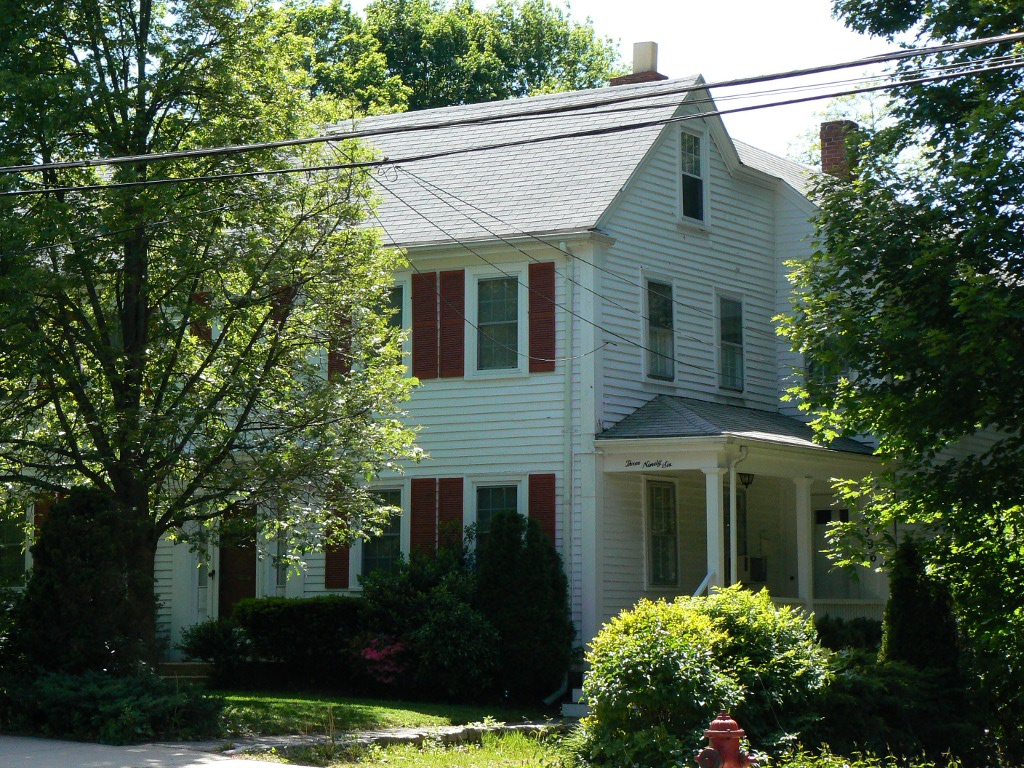

- Location within Massachusetts Location within the United States
- Location: Winchester, Massachusetts
- Coordinates: 42°26′54″N 71°8′7″W
- Built: 1840
- Architect: John H. Coats
- Architectural style: Greek Revival
- MPS: Winchester MRA
- NRHP reference No.: 89000615
- Added to NRHP: July 5, 1989

The Hutchinson-Blood House is a historic house at 394-396 Main Street in Winchester, Massachusetts, United States. The 2.5-story wood-frame house was built around 1840 by John Coats, a local housewright. The Greek Revival house was built by Coats for his in-laws, Samuel and Lucetta Hutchinson. It is basically Federal in styling, although it has a Greek Revival entry surround. The main house has had a two-story addition added to the rear, as well as a side porch.

The house was listed on the National Register of Historic Places in 1989.

== See also ==
- Hovey-Winn House, another Coats house, located next door
- National Register of Historic Places listings in Winchester, Massachusetts
