= Johnson-Thompson House =

Historic house in Massachusetts, United States

- U.S. National Register of Historic Places
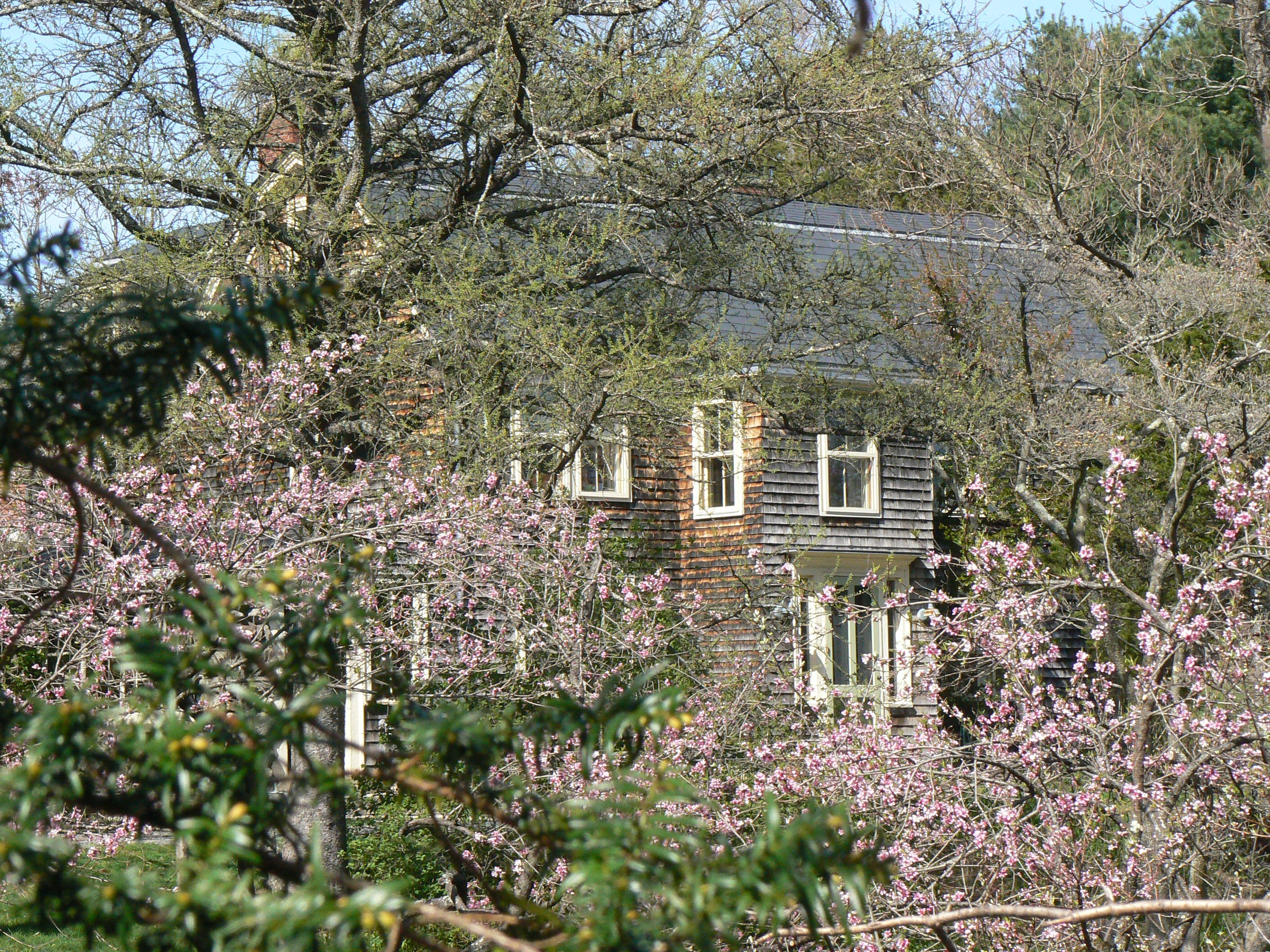

- Location within Massachusetts Location within the United States
- Location: 201 Ridge Street, Winchester, Massachusetts
- Coordinates: 42°26′54″N 71°10′36″W
- Built: 1750
- Architectural style: Georgian
- MPS: Winchester MRA
- NRHP reference No.: 89000604
- Added to NRHP: July 5, 1989

The Johnson-Thompson House is a historic house in Winchester, Massachusetts. Built c. 1750, this two story Georgian house is the oldest structure in Winchester. The house contains evidence it once had a large central chimney, a typical Georgian feature, which was later removed and replaced by the narrower chimneys on the rear wall. The house was probably built by William Johnson, a prominent figure in the history of Woburn, when this area was part of that town. In 1858 Timothy Thompson, who had married Caroline Johnson, inherited the property.

The house was listed on the National Register of Historic Places in 1989, at which time it was still in the hands of Thompson descendants.

== See also ==
- National Register of Historic Places listings in Winchester, Massachusetts
