= Sharon House (Winchester, Massachusetts) =

Historic house in Massachusetts, United States

- U.S. National Register of Historic Places
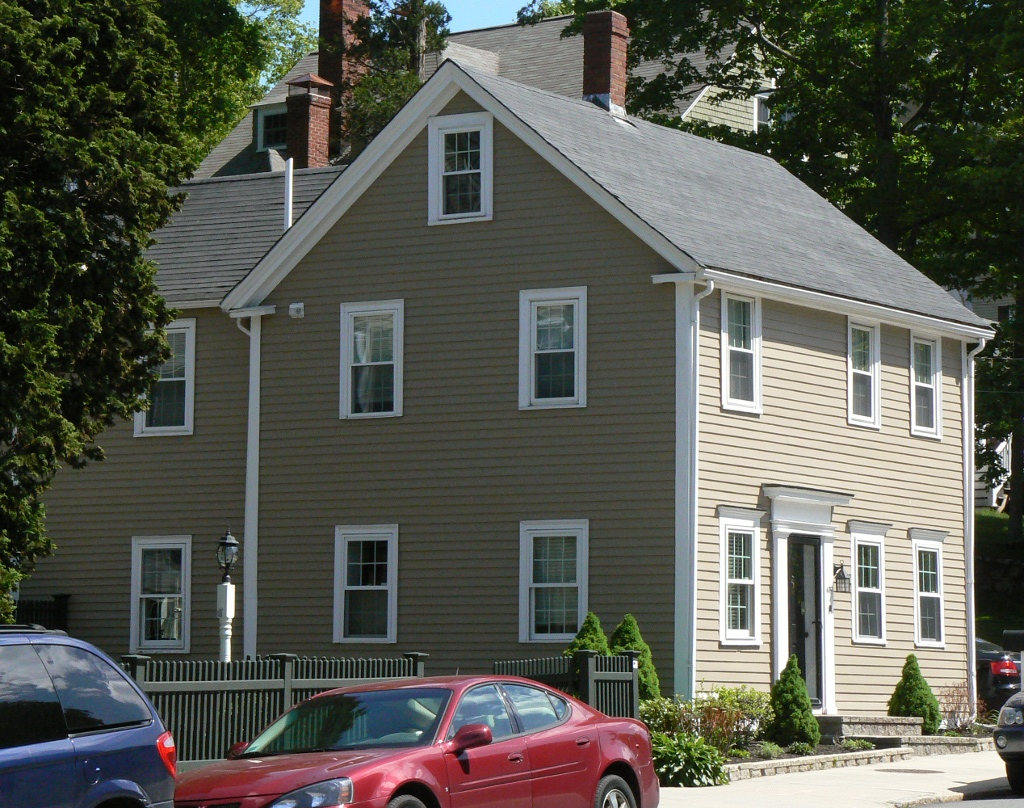

- Location within Massachusetts Location within the United States
- Location: 403 Main Street, Winchester, Massachusetts
- Coordinates: 42°26′53″N 71°8′4″W
- Built: 1835
- Architectural style: Greek Revival
- MPS: Winchester MRA
- NRHP reference No.: 89000613
- Added to NRHP: July 5, 1989

The Sharon House is a historic house in Winchester, Massachusetts. The 2.5-story wood-frame house was built c. 1835, and has basic Greek Revival styling. It is most notable as including a rare surviving remnant of the shoe manufacturing industry, which was a cottage industry in the area in the first half of the 19th century. The building's rear ell, a two-story structure, is believed to have originally been used for that purpose. It is not known if it (the ell) was built in place or moved to that location and attached to the house. The house also stands adjacent to the site of the Black Horse Tavern, and early 18th century landmark.

The house was listed on the National Register of Historic Places in 1989.

== See also ==
- National Register of Historic Places listings in Winchester, Massachusetts
