= Edward Braddock House =

Historic house in Massachusetts, United States

- U.S. National Register of Historic Places
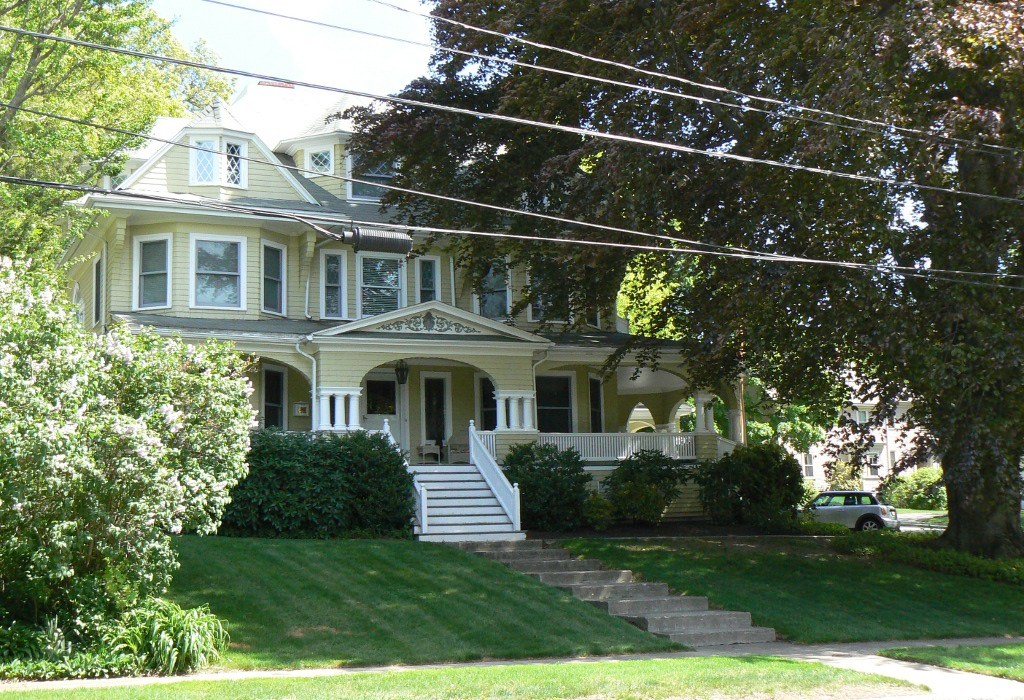

- Location within Massachusetts Location within the United States
- Location: 112 Highland Ave., Winchester, Massachusetts
- Coordinates: 42°27′41″N 71°7′27″W
- Area: less than one acre
- Built: 1893
- Architectural style: Colonial Revival, Shingle Style
- MPS: Winchester MRA
- NRHP reference No.: 89000651
- Added to NRHP: July 5, 1989

The Edward Braddock House is a historic house in Winchester, Massachusetts, United States. Built in 1893, it is a high-quality example of Colonial Revival architecture with Shingle style elements. The house was listed on the National Register of Historic Places in 1989.

== Description and history ==
The Edward Braddock House is located in an upper-class residential area of northeastern Winchester, on the east side of Highland Avenue at its junction with Wilson Street. It is a 2 1/2-story wood-frame structure, its exterior clad entirely in wooden shingles. The roof is pierced by large triangular dormers with diamond-pane windows, and a central turret-like dormer at the center of the front facade. A single-story porch extends across the front and around the side, joining to a porte-cochere. It is supported by groups of squat Tuscan columns set on shingled piers, with low balustrades in between.

The house was built in 1893, and was one of a series of fashionable homes built along Highland Avenue around the time the adjacent Middlesex Fells Reservation was established. Arthur Wyman, the developer who built the house, lived next door, and was responsible for development of much of the surrounding area. The house was owned by Edward I. Braddock, an inventor with a portfolio of patents related to metals production.

== See also ==
- National Register of Historic Places listings in Winchester, Massachusetts
