= Pressey-Eustis House =

Historic house in Massachusetts, United States

- U.S. National Register of Historic Places
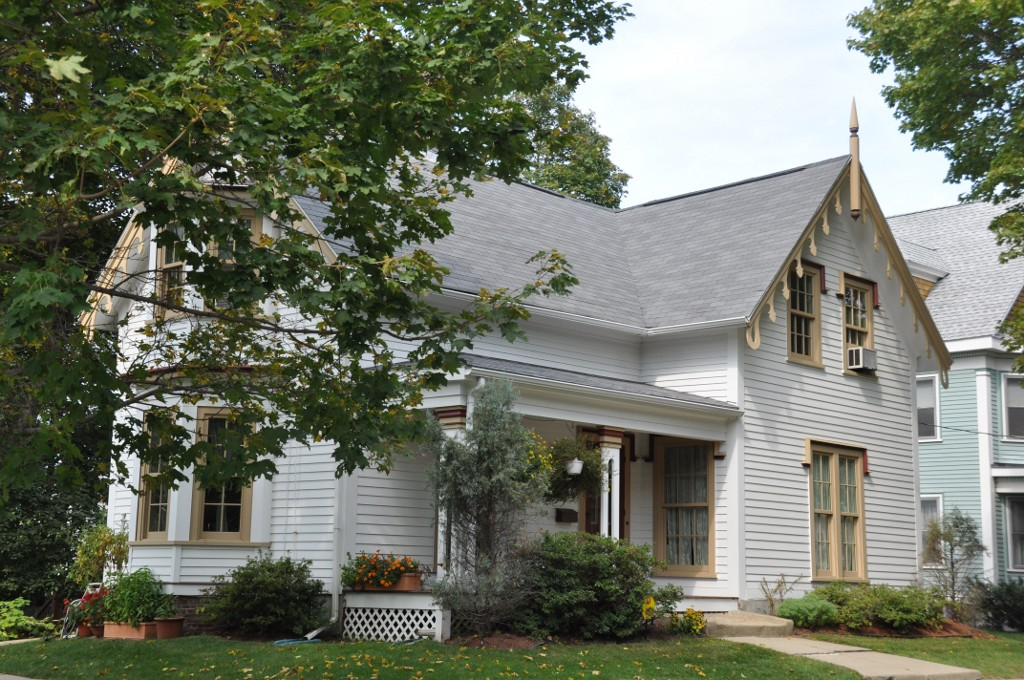

- Location within Massachusetts Location within the United States
- Location: 14 Stevens Street, Winchester, Massachusetts
- Coordinates: 42°27′13″N 71°7′51″W
- Built: 1850
- Architectural style: Gothic Revival
- MPS: Winchester MRA
- NRHP reference No.: 89000623
- Added to NRHP: July 5, 1989

The Pressey-Eustis House is a historic residence located in Winchester, Massachusetts. The 1 1/2-story wood-frame house was constructed in the early 1850s and is notable for its Gothic Victorian decorative elements. The house features an L-shaped layout typical of the period, with a porch situated at the crook of the L. Distinctive architectural features include vergeboard with an unusual acorn pattern and finials atop the gables.

George Eustis, who served as town treasurer from 1910 to 1924, resided in the house from around 1870 until 1940. The house was recognized for its historical and architectural significance and was listed on the National Register of Historic Places in 1989.

== See also ==
- National Register of Historic Places listings in Winchester, Massachusetts
