= Amy B. Mitchell House =

Historic house in Massachusetts, United States

- U.S. National Register of Historic Places
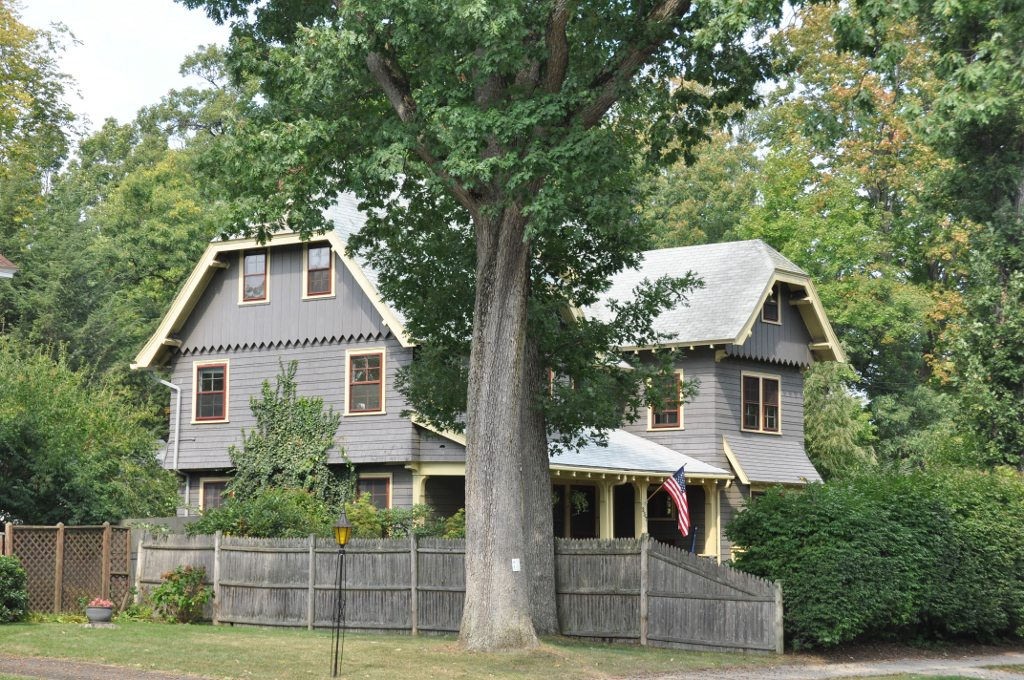

- Location within Massachusetts Location within the United States
- Location: Winchester, Massachusetts
- Coordinates: 42°27′12″N 71°7′47″W
- Built: 1909
- MPS: Winchester MRA
- NRHP reference No.: 89000653
- Added to NRHP: July 5, 1989

The Amy B. Mitchell House is a historic house at 237 Highland Avenue in Winchester, Massachusetts. The 2 1/2-story wood-frame house was built c. 1909 in an area made fashionable after the establishment of the Middlesex Fells Reservation, and is an excellent local example of Medieval Revival styling. It features jerkin-headed cross gable sections decorated with vertical valances, exposed rafter ends, and a rustic fieldstone chimney.

The house was added to the National Register of Historic Places in 1989.

== See also ==
- National Register of Historic Places listings in Winchester, Massachusetts
