= Wedgemere Historic District =

Historic district in Massachusetts, United States

- U.S. National Register of Historic Places
- U.S. Historic district
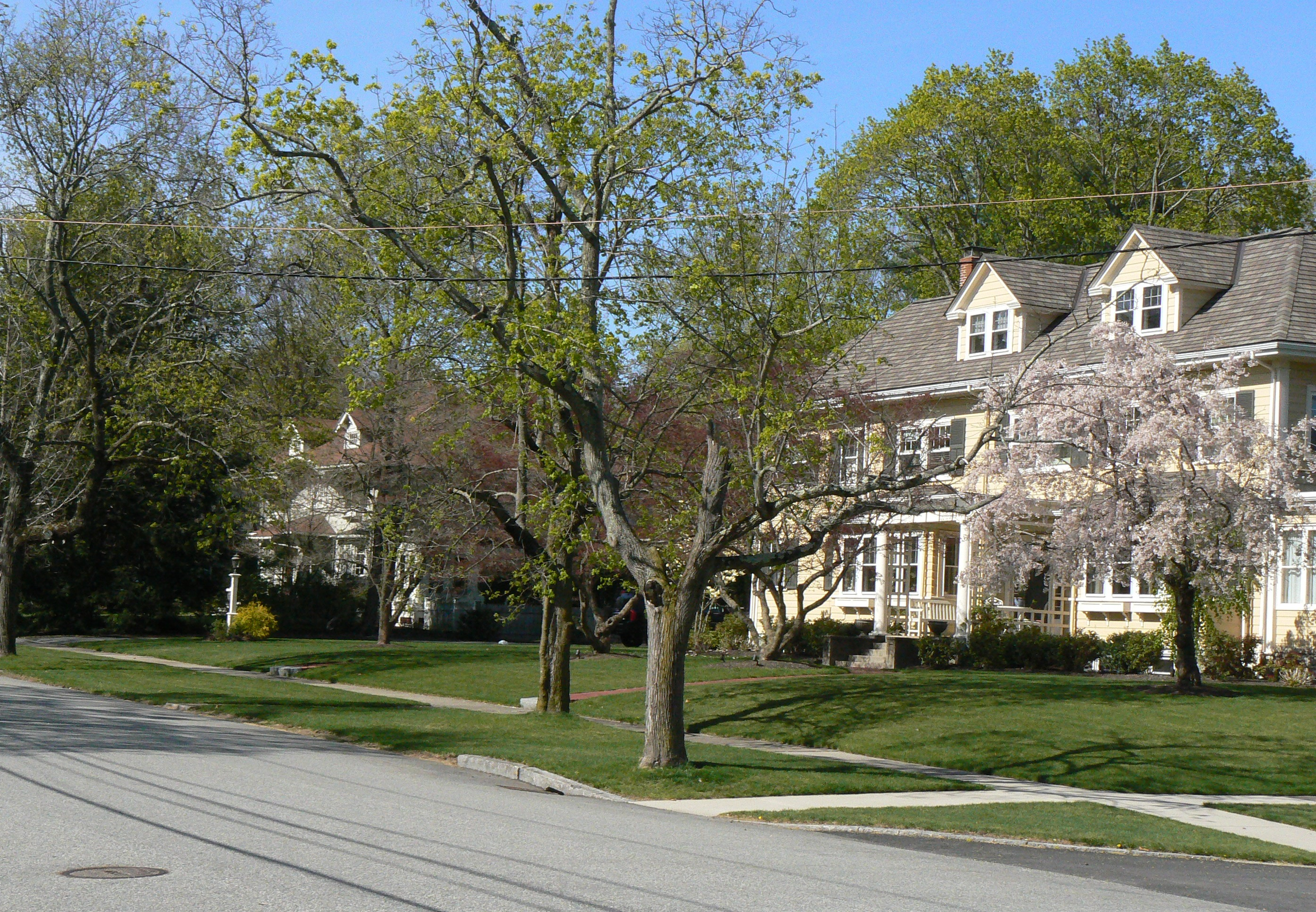
- Wedgemere Street

- Location within Massachusetts Location within the United States
- Location: Winchester, Massachusetts
- Coordinates: 42°27′8″N 71°9′2″W
- Area: 39 acres (16 ha)
- Architectural style: Colonial Revival, Bungalow/Craftsman, Queen Anne
- MPS: Winchester MRA
- NRHP reference No.: 89000659
- Added to NRHP: July 5, 1989

The Wedgemere Historic District encompasses the largest single 19th-century residential development of Winchester, Massachusetts. It is one of the town's largest surviving 19th-century residential subdivisions, with a concentration of high-quality residences built between about 1890 and 1920. The district was listed on the National Register of Historic Places in 1989.

== Description and history ==
The Wedgemere Historic District is located west of Winchester's town center, and just east of Cambridge Street (Massachusetts Route 3), a major north–south artery in the town. It is bounded on the north by Warren Street, on the east by Wildwood and Fletcher Streets, and on the south by Church Street. It is bounded on the west by Cambridge Street, but excludes properties located there. The area is characterized by large houses set back on large grassy lots, with a high level of quality and architectural character. The styles that predominate in its buildings are Queen Anne, Shingle, Colonial Revival, and Tudor Revival. Almost all of the houses were built between 1890 and 1920, with only outbuildings such as garages intruding on the landscape.

The subdivision was created by a syndicate established by Frank Forsyth, a local resident, and syndicate of Boston-based investors, who acquired 75 acres (30 ha) of land in 1891. Development was slowed by the Panic of 1893, which resulted in the dissolution of the syndicate. Over the following decades, a variety of houses were built on the land platted out by the syndicate. Early houses in the district were typically Colonial Revival with some Queen Anne styling, such as the Rice House (10 Oxford Street, c. 1893) and the Davis House (6 Calumet Road, c. 1893). By the 1910s the Craftsman style began to come into vogue, with houses like the Nickerson House (25 Calumet, built 1912). One of the most unusual houses in the district is the Spanish Revival Lombard House at 105 Church Street, built in 1908.

== See also ==
- National Register of Historic Places listings in Winchester, Massachusetts
