= William Simonds House =

Historic house in Massachusetts, United States

- U.S. National Register of Historic Places
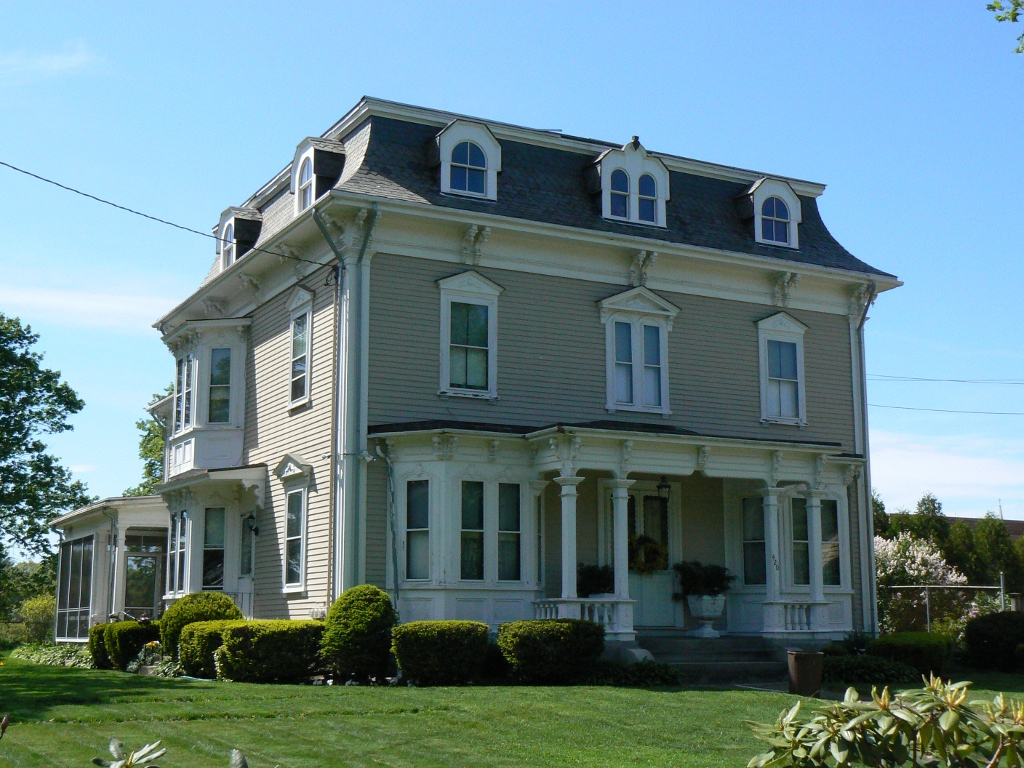

- Location within Massachusetts Location within the United States
- Location: 420 Main Street, Winchester, Massachusetts
- Coordinates: 42°26′56″N 71°8′7″W
- Built: 1877
- Architectural style: Second Empire
- MPS: Winchester MRA
- NRHP reference No.: 89000640
- Added to NRHP: July 5, 1989

The William Simonds House is a historic house in Winchester, Massachusetts. The two-story wood-frame house was built in 1877 by William Simonds and is a good local example of Second Empire styling. It has the classic mansard roof, and a symmetrical three bay front facade. On the first floor, projecting bay windows flank the entry; their bracketed roof lines are joined to that of the wide porch that shelters the front entry. The mansard roof is pierced by dormers with rounded windows.

The house was listed on the National Register of Historic Places in 1989.

== See also ==
- National Register of Historic Places listings in Winchester, Massachusetts
