= Harrison Parker Sr. House =

Historic house in Massachusetts, United States

- U.S. National Register of Historic Places
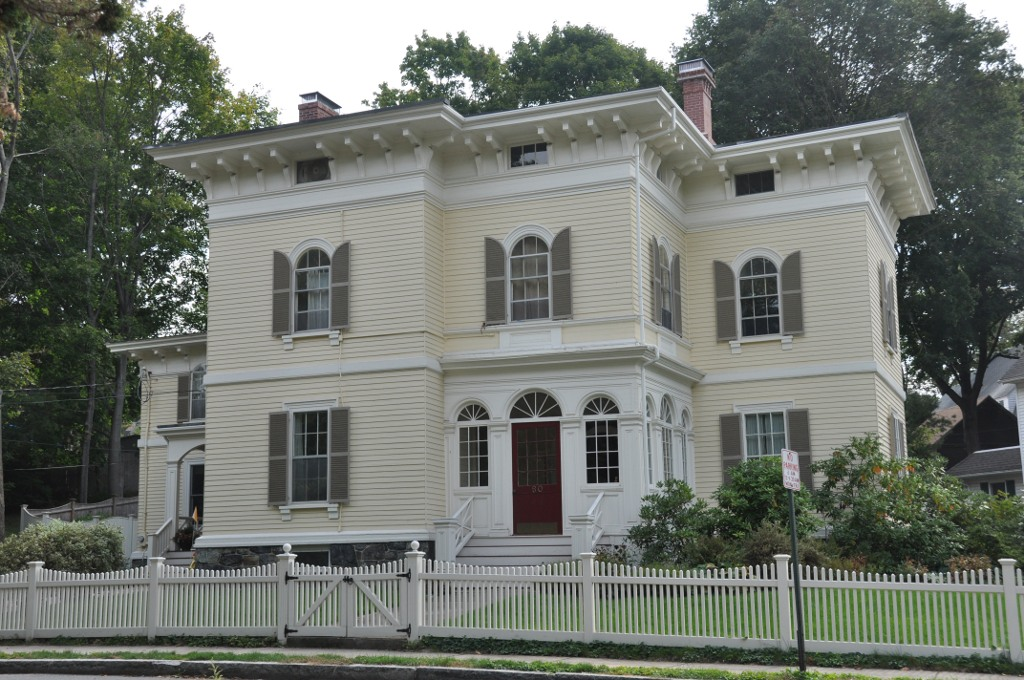

- Location within Massachusetts Location within the United States
- Location: 60 Lloyd Street, Winchester, Massachusetts
- Coordinates: 42°26′50″N 71°8′18″W
- Built: 1843
- Architectural style: Italian Villa
- MPS: Winchester MRA
- NRHP reference No.: 89000627
- Added to NRHP: July 5, 1989

The Harrison Parker Sr. House is a historic house in Winchester, Massachusetts. The 2 1/2-story wood-frame house was built in 1843 by Harrison Parker Sr., the owner of a local lumber mill. It is also one of the finer examples of Italianate style in the town, with a low-pitch hip roof with wide eaves decorated with brackets, and small attic windows set in the architrave. The second story windows have round-arch tops, and there are decorated porches on three sides. The interior includes well-preserved period details.

The house was listed on the National Register of Historic Places in 1989.

== See also ==
- National Register of Historic Places listings in Winchester, Massachusetts
