= Asa Locke House =

Historic house in Massachusetts, United States

- U.S. National Register of Historic Places
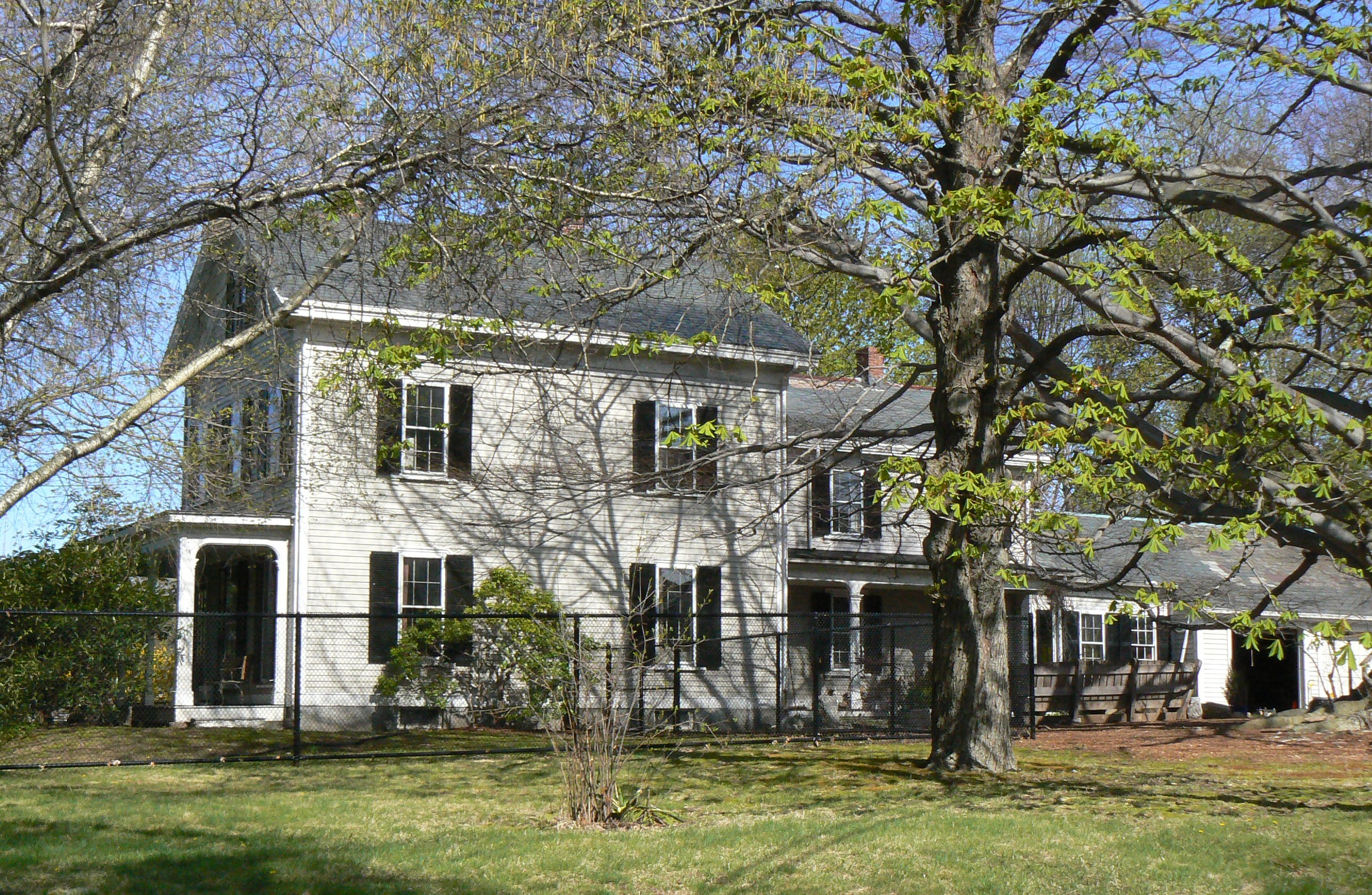

- Location within Massachusetts Location within the United States
- Location: 68 High Street, Winchester, Massachusetts
- Coordinates: 42°26′36″N 71°9′37″W
- Built: 1855
- Architectural style: Italianate
- MPS: Winchester MRA
- NRHP reference No.: 89000631
- Added to NRHP: July 5, 1989

The Asa Locke House is a historic house in Winchester, Massachusetts. Built in the mid-19th century, it is a well-preserved local example of a side-hall Italianate farmhouse. It is also notable for its association with the locally prominent Locke family, who settled the area in 1699. The house was listed on the National Register of Historic Places in 1989.

== Description and history ==
The Asa Locke House is set on the south side of High Street, at the southeast corner with Overlook Way, in what is now a predominantly residential suburban area. It is a 2 1/2-story wood-frame structure, three bays wide, with a front-facing gable roof and clapboard siding. A single-story porch extends across the north-facing front and around to the east side, supported by chamfered square posts with segmented-arch bracketing. The front door is set to one side, with full-length windows in the side base. The door is flanked by sidelight windows, and is topped by a transom window. A gabled two-story bay projects from the east side, with a lunette window in the gable, and a two-story ell and garage extend to the rear.

The Locke family history on this land dates to 1699, when James Converse bought a large tract of land in this area (then part of Woburn). Locke's descendants include Samuel Locke, who served as President of Harvard College in the 18th century. Asa Locke, a prosperous local farmer, purchased the land this house stands on in 1826. Based on stylistic analysis, this house was built c. 1855, probably for his son Elbridge, who inherited the property in 1857. The house was sold out of the Locke family in 1902, to a partner in Boston's Ivers & Pond Piano Company.

== See also ==
- National Register of Historic Places listings in Winchester, Massachusetts
