= Alfred Vinton House =

Historic house in Massachusetts, United States

- U.S. National Register of Historic Places
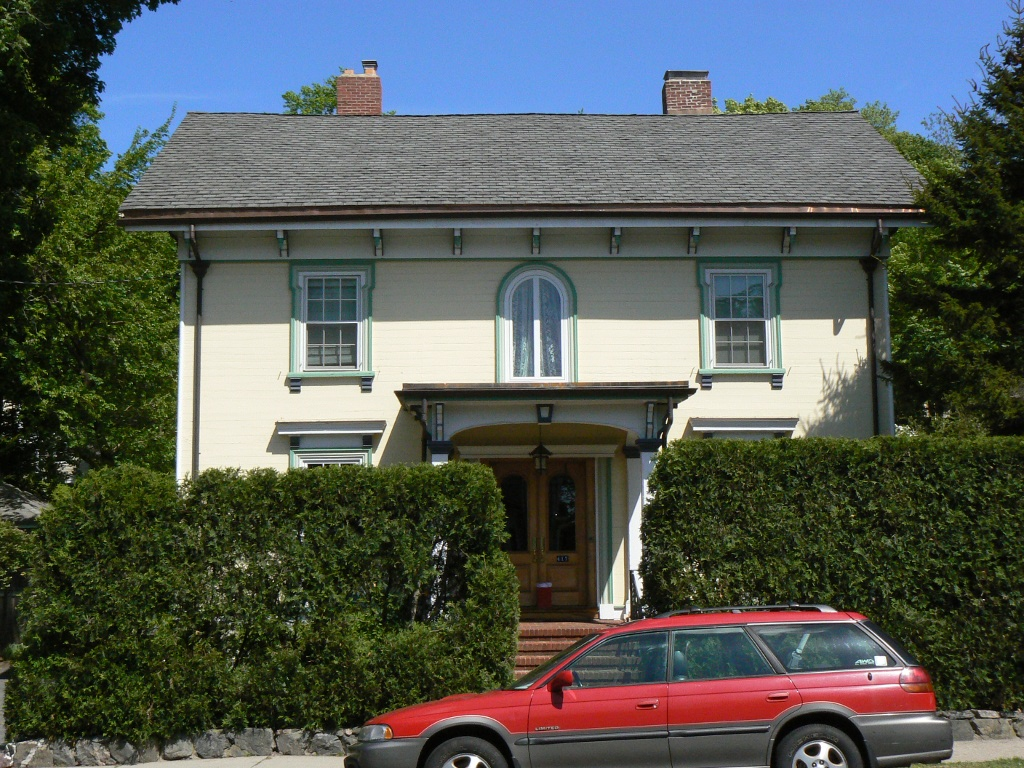

- Location within Massachusetts Location within the United States
- Location: Winchester, Massachusetts
- Coordinates: 42°26′55″N 71°8′4″W
- Built: 1854
- Architect: Symmes, Gardner
- Architectural style: Italianate
- MPS: Winchester MRA
- NRHP reference No.: 89000629
- Added to NRHP: July 5, 1989

The Alfred Vinton House is a historic house at 417 Main Street in Winchester, Massachusetts. It is a two-story wood-frame structure, three bays wide, with a side gable roof that has bracketed eaves. The front is symmetrically arranged, with a center entrance flanked by sidelight windows, and set under an elaborately decorated front porch. A round-arch window stands above the entrance. Gardner Symmes, a local builder, built the Italianate house c. 1854, and may have lived in it before Alfred Vinton, a local lawyer who married into the Symmes family, bought it in 1862. It remained in the Vinton family into the 1920s.

The house was listed on the National Register of Historic Places in 1989.

== See also ==
- National Register of Historic Places listings in Winchester, Massachusetts
