= George Brine House =

Historic house in Massachusetts, United States

- U.S. National Register of Historic Places
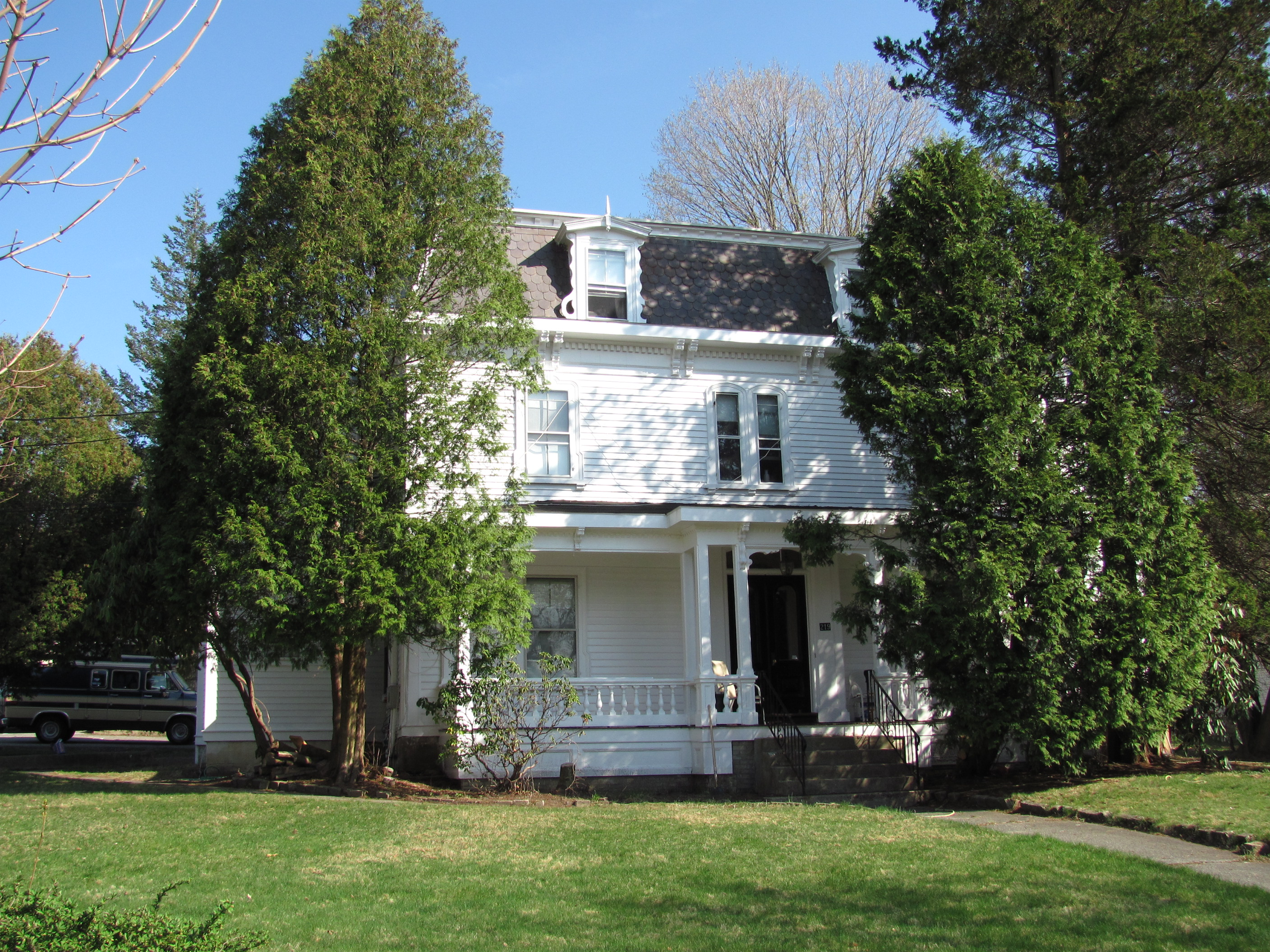
- George Brine House

- Location within Massachusetts Location within the United States
- Location: 219 Washington St., Winchester, Massachusetts
- Coordinates: 42°27′22″N 71°7′51″W
- Area: less than one acre
- Built: 1865
- Architect: Joseph S. Shattuck
- Architectural style: Second Empire
- MPS: Winchester MRA
- NRHP reference No.: 89000638
- Added to NRHP: July 5, 1989

The George Brine House is a historic house in Winchester, Massachusetts. Built about 1865, it is a well-preserved example of Second Empire architecture. It was listed on the National Register of Historic Places in 1989.

== Description and history ==
The George Brine House stands northeast of downtown Winchester, on the east side of Washington Street, a busy north–south through street, between Eaton and Webster Streets. It is a two-story wood-frame house, with a third floor under its Second Empire mansard roof. It has a full-width porch with turned balusters and paired pillars, with a projecting central section with decorative brackets. Above the central doorway are a pair of narrow round-arch windows, and the cornice has dentil moulding and paired brackets. There is scroll-cut woodwork surrounding the dormer windows, and all of the main windows have bracketed sills. Two two-story ells extend the building to the rear, and there is a period carriage barn with cupola at the back of the property.

The house was built sometime between 1854 and 1870 (estimated 1865 based on style) by Joseph Shattuck, a local builder. He apparently used it as a rental property until selling it to George Brine in 1893. The house typifies development made in the mid-19th century to attract new residents to what was then seen as a fashionable residential area.

== See also ==
- National Register of Historic Places listings in Winchester, Massachusetts
