= Skillings Estate House =

Historic house in Massachusetts, United States

- U.S. National Register of Historic Places
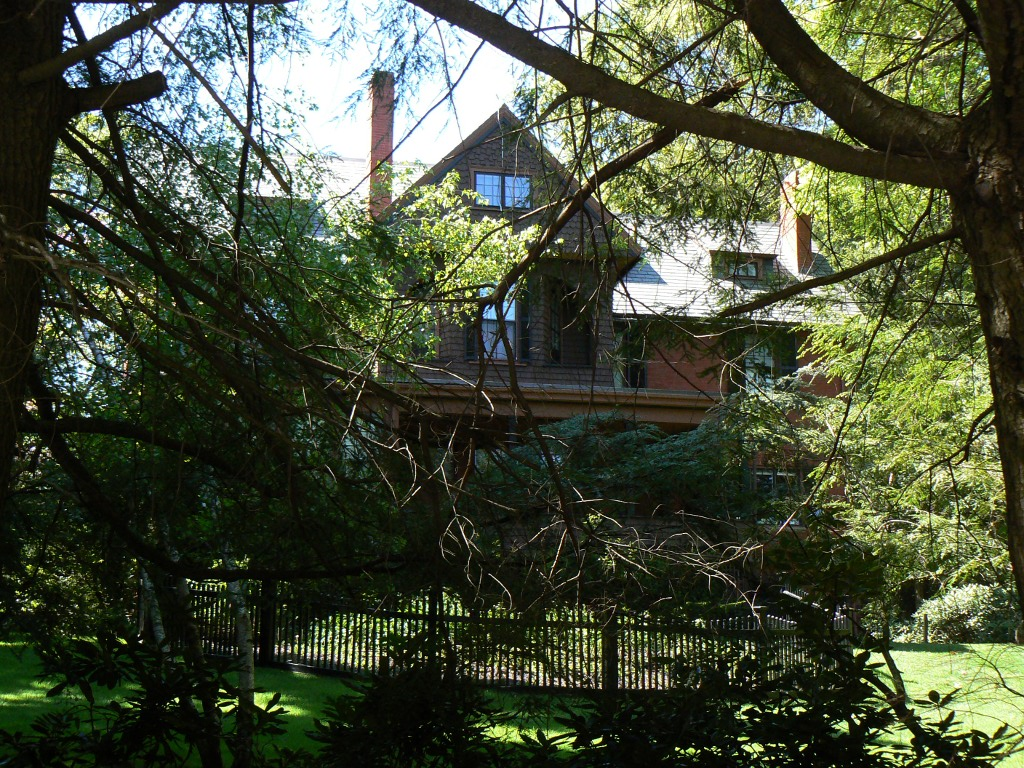

- Location within Massachusetts Location within the United States
- Location: 37 Rangeley Road, Winchester, Massachusetts
- Coordinates: 42°26′53″N 71°8′29″W
- Built: 1880
- Architectural style: Queen Anne, Shingle Style
- MPS: Winchester MRA
- NRHP reference No.: 89000645
- Added to NRHP: July 5, 1989

The Skillings Estate House is a historic house in Winchester, Massachusetts. Built about 1880 by a Maine lumber magnate David Skillings, it is one of four houses he built as part of his exclusive Rangeley Estate. The house was listed on the National Register of Historic Places in 1989.

== Description and history ==
The Rangeley Estate subdivision was a high-end residential development, located southwest of Winchester center on the west side of the railroad tracks. The land was purchased by David Skilling, a lumber businessman from Maine, and developed by him into an exclusive gated development (its wall and a gate are still visible on Church Street, at the northern end of the development). This house was built by Skilling, but it is not known for whom he built it. (Skillings' own house, built in the 1870s, has not survived.)

This house is located on a broad lot at the corner of Central Street and Rangeley Road. It is 2 1/2 stories in height, and has irregular Queen Anne massing and an asymmetrical facade that has a projecting gable section with decorative shingles. The projection is supported by shingled brackets and arches framing a double sash window. A porch, partially enclosed, extends across the front. The roof gables have Stick style woodwork, and the Central Street facade features a floral brick panel between the floors.

== See also ==
- National Register of Historic Places listings in Winchester, Massachusetts
