= Edmund Parker Jr. House =

Historic house in Massachusetts, United States

- U.S. National Register of Historic Places
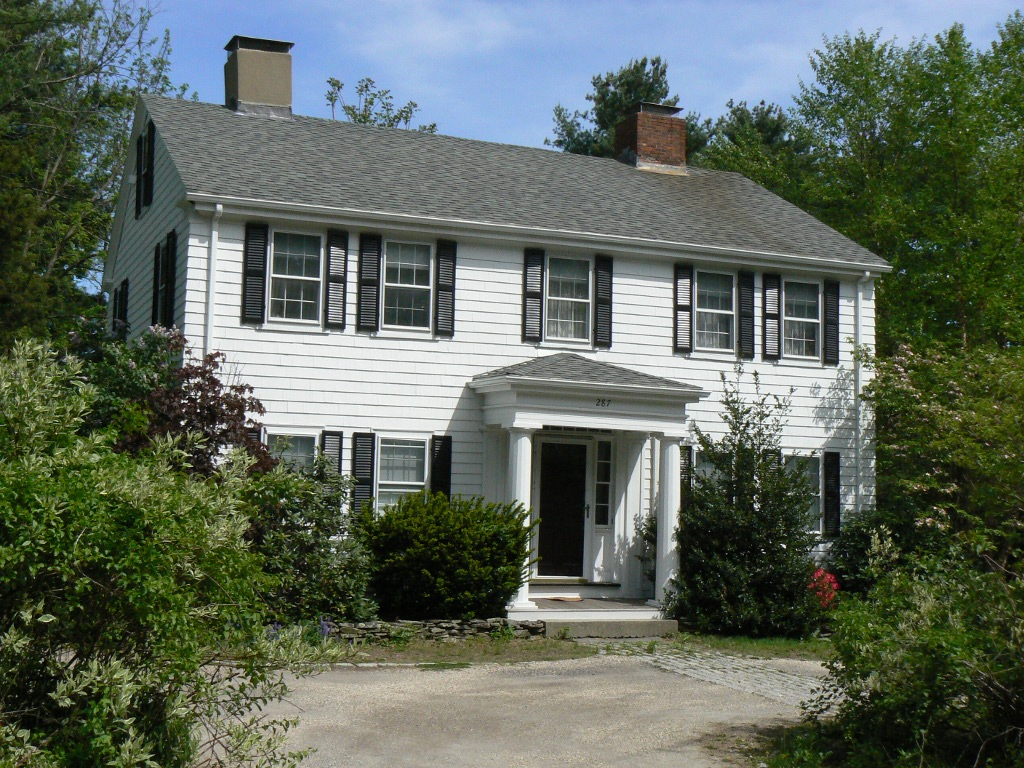

- Location within Massachusetts Location within the United States
- Location: 287 Cambridge Street, Winchester, Massachusetts
- Coordinates: 42°27′22″N 71°9′35″W
- Built: 1826
- Architectural style: Greek Revival, Federal
- MPS: Winchester MRA
- NRHP reference No.: 89000610
- Added to NRHP: July 5, 1989

The Edmund Parker Jr. House is a historic house in Winchester, Massachusetts. The 2 1/2-story wood-frame house was built c. 1826, and is one of a few transitional Federal-Greek Revival houses in the town. It has the typical Federal plan of five bays wide and two deep, with a center entry framed by a Greek Revival portico. The house was built by Edmund Parker Jr., whose father was one of the first settlers in the area.

The house was listed on the National Register of Historic Places in 1989.

== See also ==
- National Register of Historic Places listings in Winchester, Massachusetts
