= Zachariah Richardson House =

Historic house in Massachusetts, United States

- U.S. National Register of Historic Places
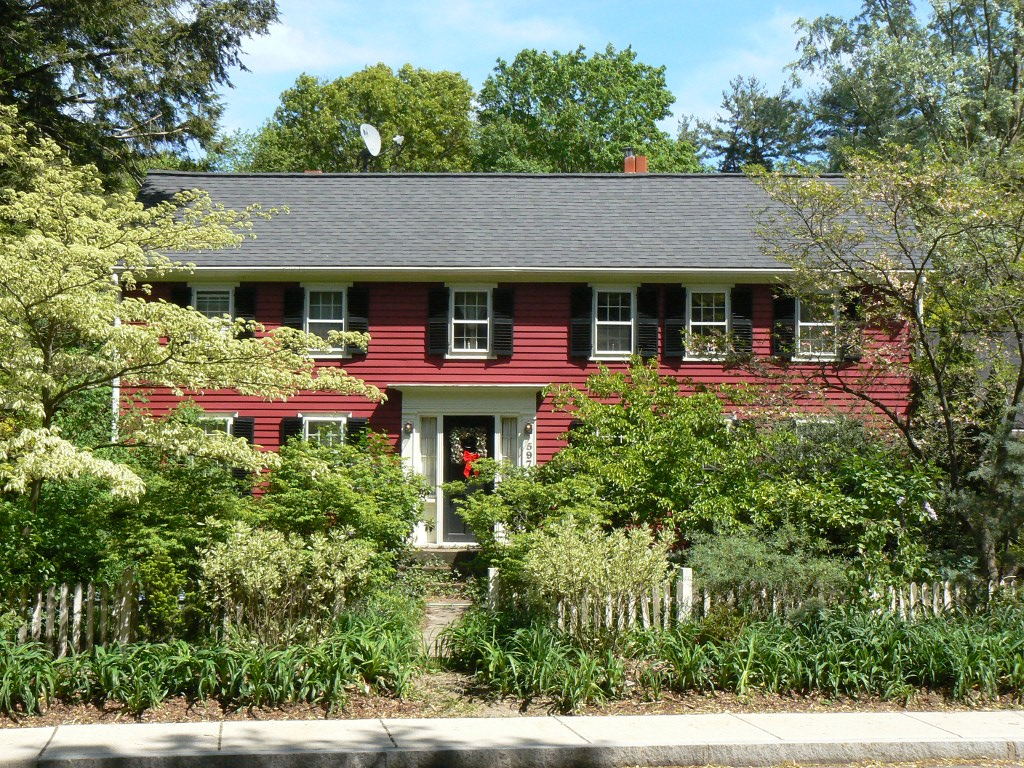

- Location within Massachusetts Location within the United States
- Location: 597 Washington Street, Winchester, Massachusetts
- Coordinates: 42°28′8″N 71°7′31″W
- Built: 1794
- Architectural style: Greek Revival
- MPS: Winchester MRA
- NRHP reference No.: 89000618
- Added to NRHP: July 5, 1989

The Zachariah Richardson House is a historic house in Winchester, Massachusetts. The 2.5-story wood-frame house has an irregular six-bay facade, a side gable roof, and clapboard siding. It was built in 1818, but may incorporate elements of a schoolhouse built in 1794, which previously stood on that site. The house is significant for its association with the Richardson family, the first colonial settlers of the area (arriving in the Washington Street area by 1642).

The house was listed on the National Register of Historic Places in 1989.

== See also ==
- National Register of Historic Places listings in Winchester, Massachusetts
