= Cole House (Winchester, Massachusetts) =

Historic house in Massachusetts, United States

- U.S. National Register of Historic Places
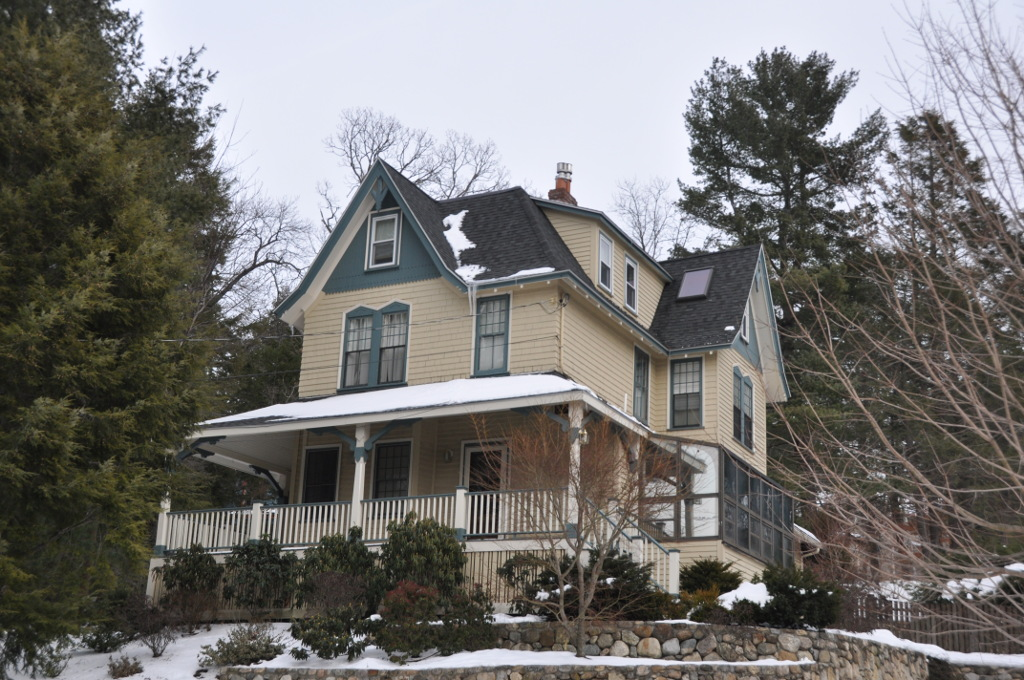

- Location within Massachusetts Location within the United States
- Location: Highland Ave., Winchester, Massachusetts
- Coordinates: 42°26′59″N 71°7′47″W
- Area: less than one acre
- Built: 1886
- Architectural style: Stick/Eastlake, Queen Anne
- MPS: Winchester MRA
- NRHP reference No.: 89000646
- Added to NRHP: July 5, 1989

The Cole House is a historic house on Highland Avenue in Winchester, Massachusetts. Built in 1886, it is one of the town's most elaborate displays of Stick style decoration. The house was added to the National Register of Historic Places in 1989.

== Description and history ==
The Cole House stands in a residential area east of downtown Winchester, on the east side of Highland Avenue just north of its junction with Mason Street. It is a 2 1/2-story wood-frame structure, with a complex gable and hip roof, an exterior of wooden clapboards and shingles, and a modern concrete foundation. Its basic plan is a T shape, with a single-story hip roofed porch extending across the front and part way along each side. Modillion blocks adorn the eaves, and there is Stick style wood work in the gable ends. The porch is supported by chamfered square posts, with large carved braces supporting its roof.

The house was built in 1886 by Frank and Emma Cole, who lived there until 1929. Since its listing on the National Register, it has been recorded as demolished by the Massachusetts Historical Commission. It was originally set directly at the corner of Mason Street and Highland Avenue, but has been moved a short distance north of its original location and is now oriented facing Highland Avenue, standing on a new foundation with a garage underneath.

== See also ==
- National Register of Historic Places listings in Winchester, Massachusetts
