= Philemon Wright/Asa Locke Farm =

- U.S. National Register of Historic Places
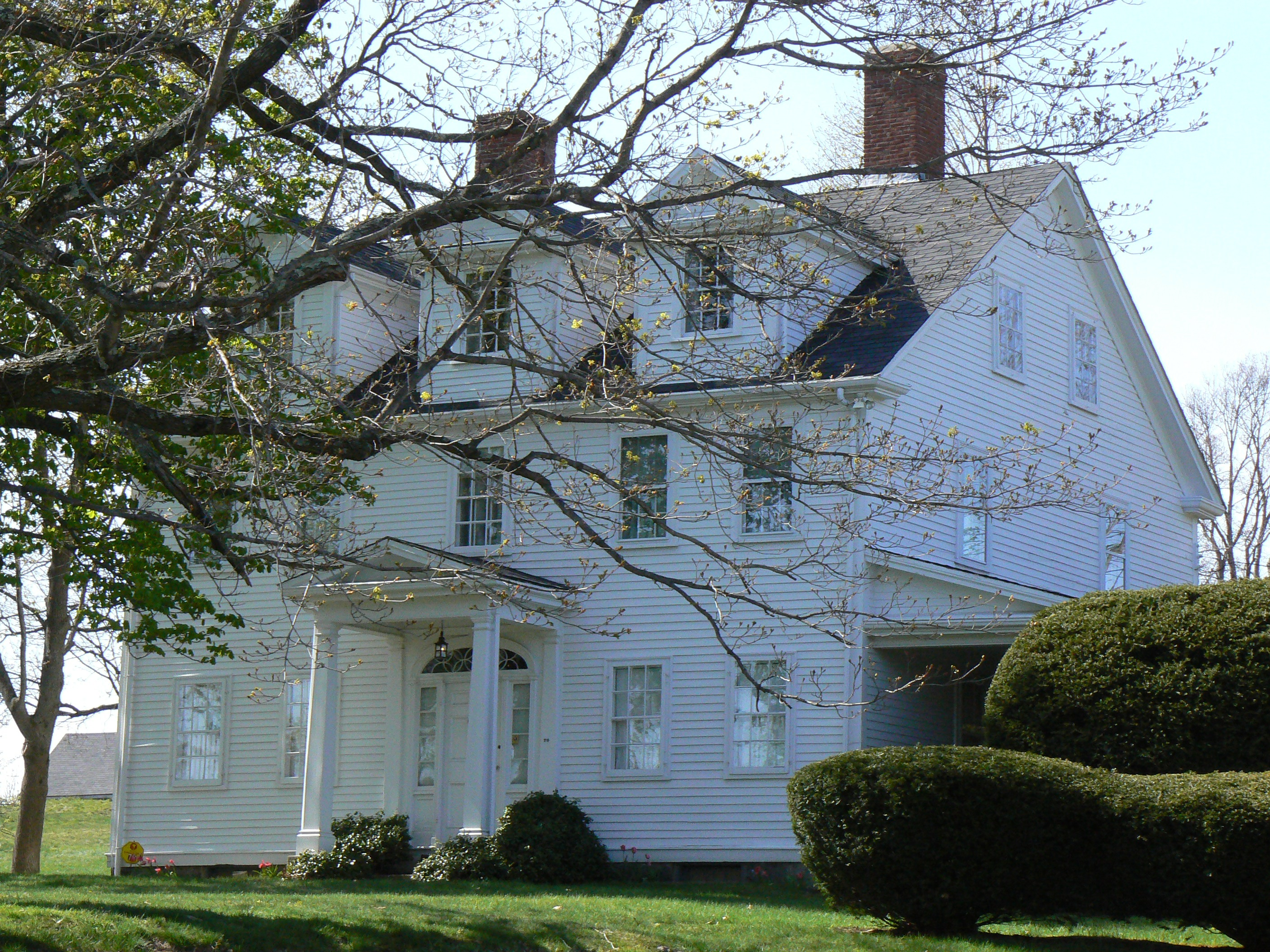

- Location within Massachusetts Location within the United States
- Location: Winchester, Massachusetts
- Coordinates: 42°26′29″N 71°10′35″W
- Built: 1827
- Architectural style: Colonial Revival
- Website: Wright-Locke Farm
- NRHP reference No.: 83000838
- Added to NRHP: March 10, 1983

The Philemon Wright/Asa Locke Farm, better known as "Wright-Locke Farm," is a historic farm at 78 Ridge Street in Winchester, Massachusetts. The organic farm grows and sells produce and offers educational programs for children and adults on land now owned by the Wright-Locke Land Trust.

== History ==
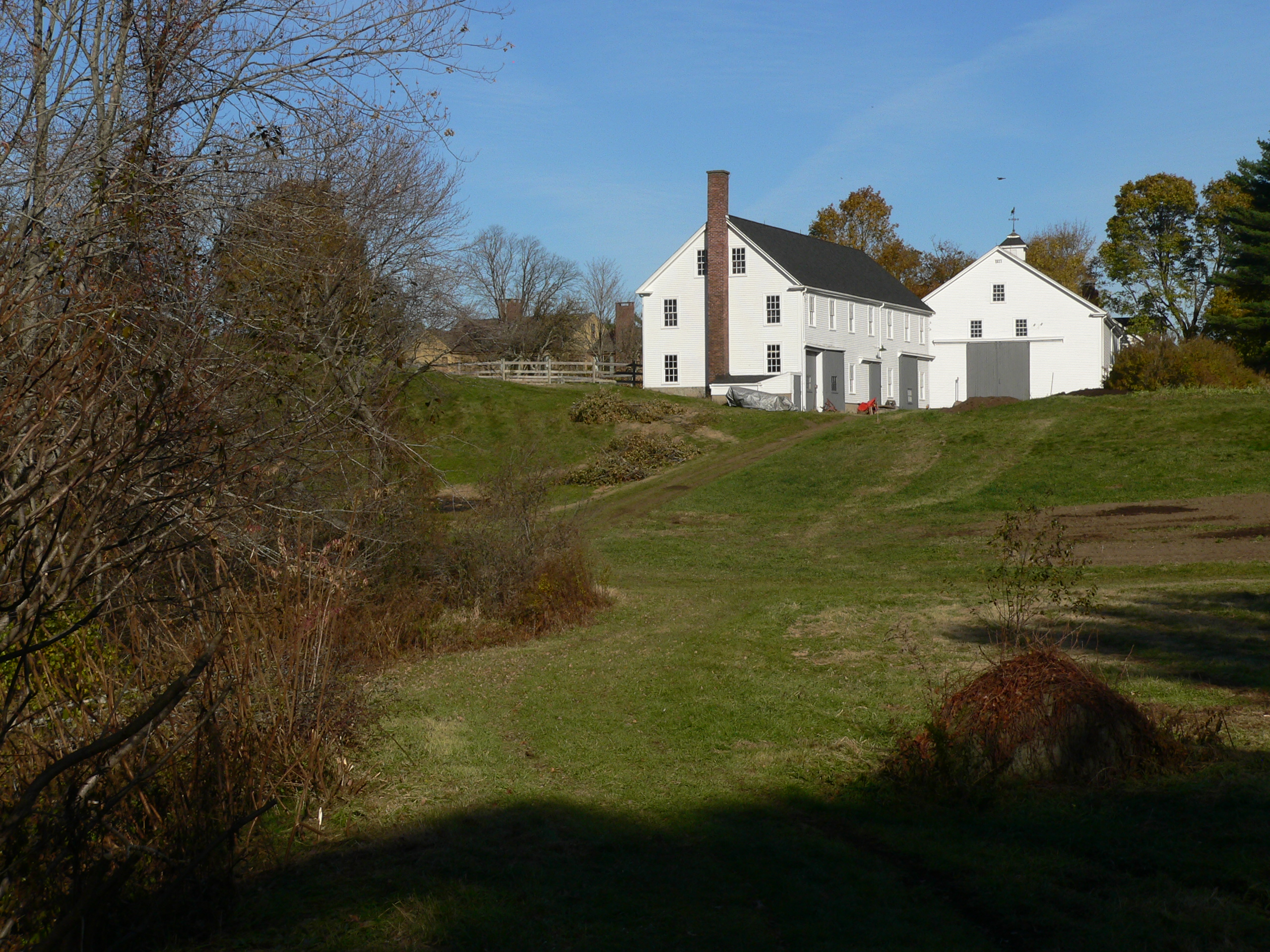

The property was owned around the turn of the 19th century by Philemon Wright, a noted explorer of Canada, and was developed by the family of Josiah Locke, to whom he sold the property in 1800 before embarking on his explorations. The Greek Revival farmhouse was probably built around 1828 by Asa Locke. The farm remained in the Locke family into the 20th century.

In 2007, the Town of Winchester purchased the farm, then 20 acres, for $14 million to prevent the construction of a 300-unit housing development. The intention at the time was to sell 12.5 acres to a developer who planned to build fewer homes. However, the developer defaulted on payments in 2010 and forfeited a deposit on the land, leaving the town in the hole.

Advocates then launched a fund-raising campaign to prevent any residential development on the land. In May 2015, Town Meeting members voted to authorize the Board of Selectmen to sell the 12.5 acres to the Wright-Locke Land Trust for $8.6 million.

The property was listed on the National Register of Historic Places in 1983. It is one of a few working farms in Winchester.

== The Farm Today ==
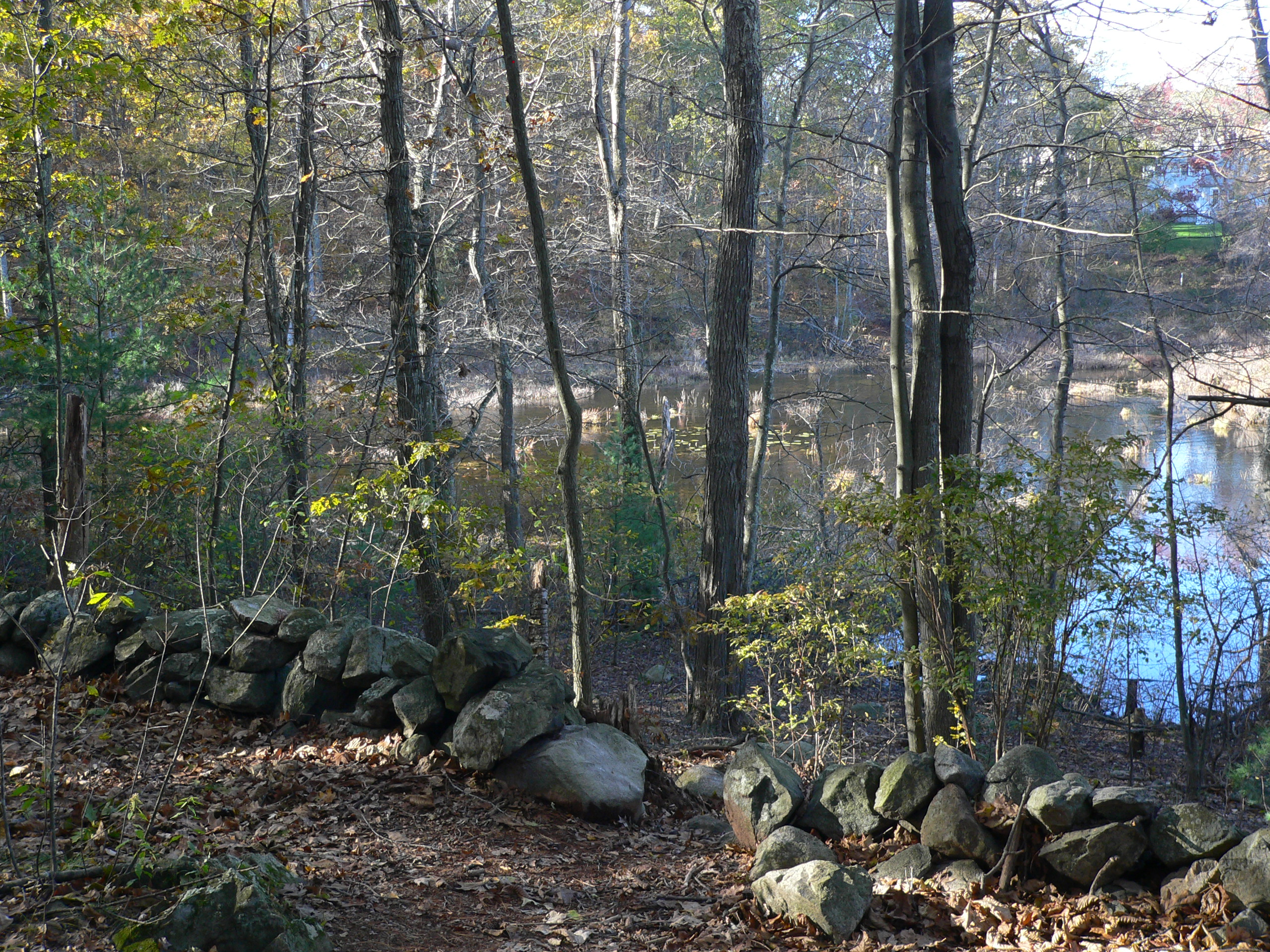
Stone fence and pond

Wright-Locke Farm draws visitors to its farm stand, outdoor concerts, lectures, workshops, educational camps for children, and pick-your-own raspberries. It also is a popular spot for weddings. Walking paths are open to public year-round.

In 2017, the farm kicked off a capital campaign to raise $4.8 million to build an Education Center with a kitchen and classroom. Such a building would allow the farm to run its educational programming year-round.

== See also ==
- National Register of Historic Places listings in Winchester, Massachusetts
