= Patience and Sarah Gardner House =

Historic house in Massachusetts, United States

- U.S. National Register of Historic Places
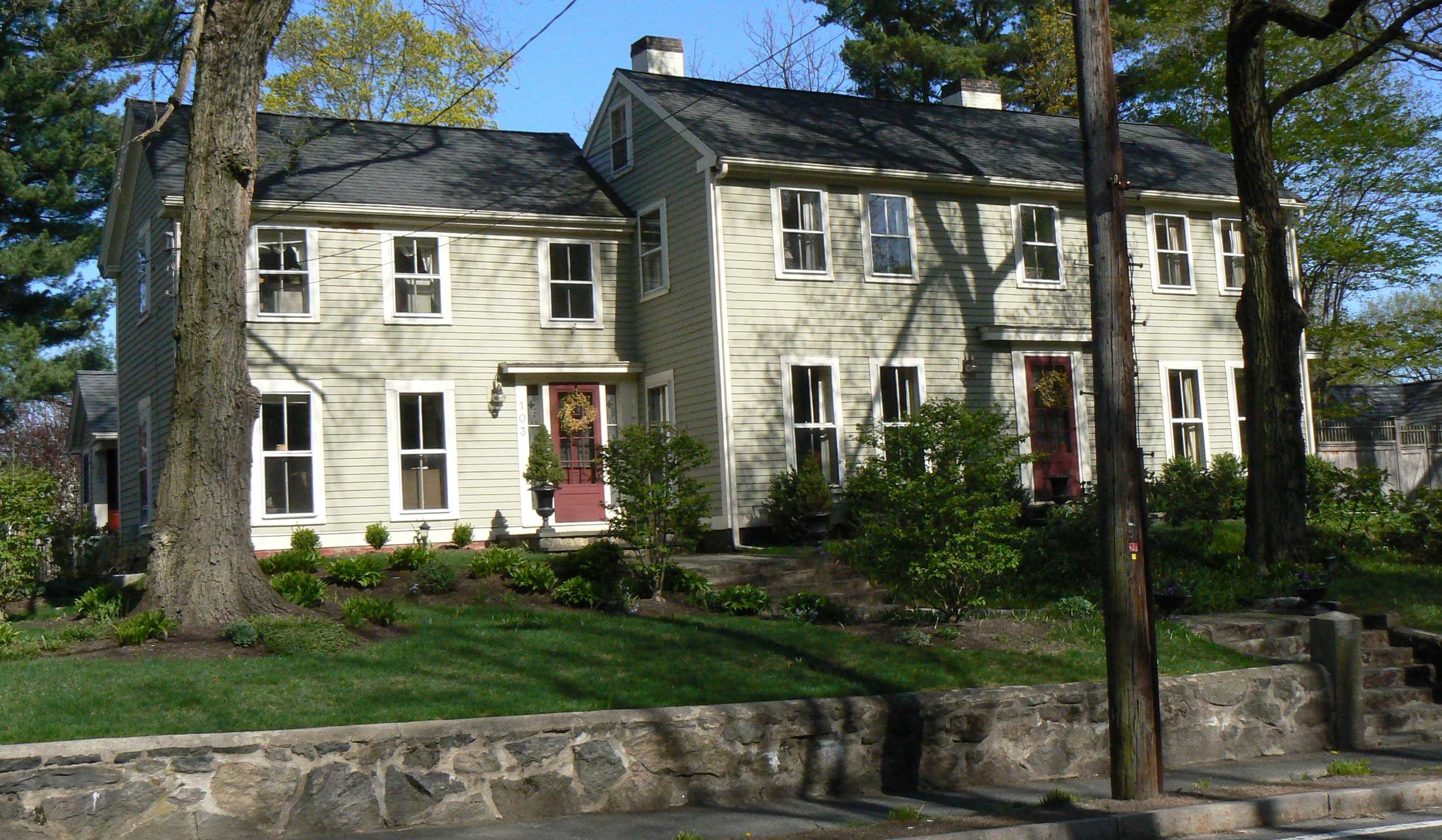

- Location within Massachusetts Location within the United States
- Location: 103–105 Cambridge Street, Winchester, Massachusetts
- Coordinates: 42°26′40″N 71°9′8″W
- Built: 1825
- Architectural style: Federal
- MPS: Winchester MRA
- NRHP reference No.: 89000608
- Added to NRHP: July 5, 1989

The Patience and Sarah Gardner House is a historic house in Winchester, Massachusetts. This 2 1/2-story wood-frame house was built c. 1830 on land that had been in the Gardner family since the mid-17th century. Patience and Sarah Gardner were sisters who purchased the property in 1825, and lived there until their deaths in 1857 and 1864. The house is an excellent local example of vernacular Federal styling.

The house was listed on the National Register of Historic Places in 1989.

== See also ==
- National Register of Historic Places listings in Winchester, Massachusetts
