= Arthur H. Russell House =

Historic house in Massachusetts, United States

- U.S. National Register of Historic Places
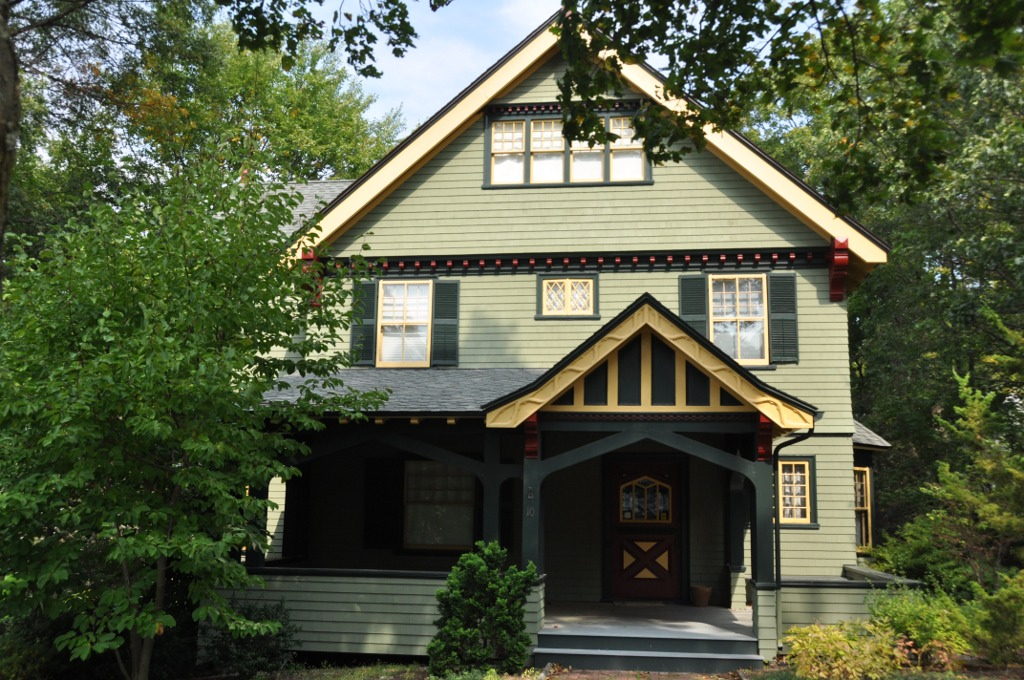

- Location within Massachusetts Location within the United States
- Location: 10 Mt. Pleasant St., Winchester, Massachusetts
- Coordinates: 42°26′53″N 71°8′29″W
- Built: 1899
- MPS: Winchester MRA
- NRHP reference No.: 89000652
- Added to NRHP: July 5, 1989

The Arthur H. Russell House is a historic house in Winchester, Massachusetts. The 2 1/2-story wood-frame house was built in 1899 for Arthur H. Russell, a Boston lawyer who also served as moderator of Winchester's town meetings. The house is a distinctive local example of Medieval Revival styling, with heavily shingled elements, decorative vergeboard trim, and window styles of varying size and window pane type.

The house was listed on the National Register of Historic Places in 1989.

== See also ==
- National Register of Historic Places listings in Winchester, Massachusetts
