= National Register of Historic Places listings in Winchester, Massachusetts =

Location of Winchester in Massachusetts

This is a list of properties and historic districts in Winchester, Massachusetts, that are listed on the National Register of Historic Places.

The locations of National Register properties and districts (at least for all showing latitude and longitude coordinates below) may be seen in an online map by clicking on "Map of all coordinates".

This National Park Service list is complete through NPS recent listings posted May 1, 2026.

== Current listings ==
	Name on the Register	Image	Date listed	Location	City or town	Description
1	Albert Ayer House	Albert Ayer House	July 5, 1989 (#89000635)	8 Brooks St. 42°26′31″N 71°08′15″W		
2	Thomas Ayer House	Thomas Ayer House	July 5, 1989 (#89000630)	8 Grove St. 42°26′32″N 71°08′14″W		
3	Robert Bacon House	Robert Bacon House	July 5, 1989 (#89000611)	6 Mystic Valley Parkway; 42°26′36″N 71°08′34″W		
4	Kenelum Baker House	Kenelum Baker House	July 5, 1989 (#89000632)	4 Norwood St. 42°26′58″N 71°08′41″W		
5	Edward A. Brackett House	Edward A. Brackett House	July 5, 1989 (#89000626)	290 Highland Ave. 42°27′00″N 71°07′45″W		
6	Edward Braddock House	Edward Braddock House	July 5, 1989 (#89000651)	112 Highland Ave. 42°27′41″N 71°07′27″W		
7	George Brine House	George Brine House	July 5, 1989 (#89000638)	219 Washington St. 42°27′22″N 71°07′51″W		
8	Carr-Jeeves House	Carr-Jeeves House	August 2, 1989 (#89000639)	57 Lake St. 42°27′23″N 71°08′30″W		
9	Webster Childs House	Webster Childs House	July 5, 1989 (#89000644)	9 Meadowcroft Rd. 42°26′49″N 71°08′27″W		
10	Cole House	Cole House	July 5, 1989 (#89000646)	Highland Ave. 42°27′00″N 71°07′46″W		Listed as demolished; house has actually been moved a short distance to a new foundation.
11	DeRochmont House	DeRochmont House	July 5, 1989 (#89000642)	2–4 Rangeley Rd. 42°27′03″N 71°08′23″W		
12	Dike-Orne House	Dike-Orne House	July 5, 1989 (#89000621)	257 Forest St. 42°28′23″N 71°06′47″W		Demolished.
13	Edmund Dwight House	Edmund Dwight House	July 5, 1989 (#89000633)	5 Cambridge St. 42°26′10″N 71°09′15″W		Property straddles the town line with Arlington
14	Samuel Elder House	Samuel Elder House	July 5, 1989 (#89000643)	38 Rangeley Rd. 42°26′51″N 71°08′30″W		
15	Everett Avenue-Sheffield Road Historic District	Everett Avenue-Sheffield Road Historic District	July 5, 1989 (#89000661)	Roughly bounded by Bacon St., Mystic Valley Parkway, Mystic Lake, Niles Ln., Everett Ave., Sheffield Rd., and Church St. 42°26′43″N 71°08′49″W		
16	Firth-Glengarry Historic District	Firth-Glengarry Historic District	July 5, 1989 (#89000662)	Roughly bounded by Pine St., Grassmere Ave., Dix St., and Wildwood St. 42°27′05″N 71°08′38″W		
17	Edward Gardner House	Edward Gardner House	July 5, 1989 (#89000605)	Zero Gardner Place; 42°26′39″N 71°09′08″W		
18	O. W. Gardner House	O. W. Gardner House	July 5, 1989 (#89000791)	5 Myrtle St. 42°27′08″N 71°07′59″W		
19	Patience and Sarah Gardner House	Patience and Sarah Gardner House	July 5, 1989 (#89000608)	103–105 Cambridge St. 42°26′40″N 71°09′08″W		
20	Ginn Carriage House	Ginn Carriage House	July 5, 1989 (#89000655)	24 Ginn Rd. 42°26′48″N 71°08′28″W		
21	Ginn Gardener's House	Ginn Gardener's House	July 5, 1989 (#89000654)	22 Ginn Rd. 42°26′47″N 71°08′26″W		
22	Henry Grover House	Henry Grover House	July 5, 1989 (#89000641)	223–225 Cambridge St. 42°27′13″N 71°09′31″W		
23	Horace Hatch House	Horace Hatch House	July 5, 1989 (#89000612)	26 Grove St. 42°26′27″N 71°08′27″W		
24	Hovey-Winn House	Hovey-Winn House	July 5, 1989 (#89000616)	384 Main St. 42°26′51″N 71°08′06″W		
25	Hutchinson-Blood House	Hutchinson-Blood House	July 5, 1989 (#89000615)	394-396 Main St. 42°26′54″N 71°08′07″W		
26	Johnson-Thompson House	Johnson-Thompson House	July 5, 1989 (#89000604)	201 Ridge St. 42°26′54″N 71°10′36″W		
27	Marshall W. Jones House	Marshall W. Jones House	July 5, 1989 (#89000649)	326 Highland Ave. 42°26′53″N 71°07′46″W		
28	Asa Locke House	Asa Locke House	July 5, 1989 (#89000631)	68 High St. 42°26′36″N 71°09′37″W		
29	Capt. Josiah Locke House	Capt. Josiah Locke House	March 2, 1979 (#79000356)	195 High St. 42°26′37″N 71°10′24″W		
30	James H. Mann House	James H. Mann House	July 5, 1989 (#89000624)	23 Hancock St. 42°27′24″N 71°07′44″W		
31	John Mason House	John Mason House	July 5, 1989 (#89000634)	10 Hillside Ave. 42°26′59″N 71°07′57″W		
32	Louis N. Maxwell House	Louis N. Maxwell House	July 5, 1989 (#89000650)	16 Herrick St. 42°26′47″N 71°07′57″W		
33	Samuel W. McCall House		July 5, 1989 (#89000657)	4 McCall Rd. 42°26′27″N 71°09′13″W		NARA ID# 63792305
34	Middlesex Canal Historic and Archaeological District	Middlesex Canal Historic and Archaeological District	November 19, 2009 (#09000936)	Numerous locations along the historic route of the Middlesex Canal; 42°26′29″N 71°08′55″W		Extends into other Middlesex County communities and Boston in Suffolk County; encompasses entire Middlesex Canal route.
35	Middlesex Fells Reservation Parkways	Middlesex Fells Reservation Parkways	February 4, 2003 (#02001749)	E Border Rd., Fellsway E., Fellsway W., Hillcrest Parkway, South St., Pond St., S. Border Rd., Ravine Rd., and Woodland Rd. 42°26′43″N 71°06′10″W		
36	Amy B. Mitchell House	Amy B. Mitchell House	July 5, 1989 (#89000653)	237 Highland Ave. 42°27′12″N 71°07′47″W		
37	Moore House	Moore House	July 5, 1989 (#89000620)	85 Walnut St. 42°27′04″N 71°07′49″W		
38	Mystic Valley Parkway, Metropolitan Park System of Greater Boston MPS	Mystic Valley Parkway, Metropolitan Park System of Greater Boston MPS	January 18, 2006 (#05001529)	Mystic Valley Parkway; 42°25′47″N 71°07′49″W		Extends from Winchester through Medford, Arlington, and Somerville
39	Oak Knoll	Oak Knoll	July 5, 1989 (#89000648)	17 Brooks Street; 42°26′25″N 71°08′21″W		
40	Parker House	Parker House	July 5, 1989 (#89000628)	180 Mystic Valley Parkway; 42°26′56″N 71°07′59″W		
41	Edmund Parker Jr. House	Edmund Parker Jr. House	July 5, 1989 (#89000610)	287 Cambridge St. 42°27′22″N 71°09′35″W		
42	Harrison Parker Sr. House	Harrison Parker Sr. House	July 5, 1989 (#89000627)	60 Lloyd St. 42°26′50″N 71°08′18″W		
43	Pressey-Eustis House	Pressey-Eustis House	July 5, 1989 (#89000623)	14 Stevens St. 42°27′13″N 71°07′51″W		
44	Joseph Remick House	Joseph Remick House	July 5, 1989 (#89000656)	84 Cambridge St./4 Swan Rd. 42°26′37″N 71°09′11″W		
45	Zachariah Richardson House	Zachariah Richardson House	July 5, 1989 (#89000618)	597 Washington St. 42°28′08″N 71°07′31″W		
46	Arthur H. Russell House	Arthur H. Russell House	July 5, 1989 (#89000652)	10 Mt. Pleasant St. 42°26′53″N 71°08′29″W		
47	Charles Russell House	Charles Russell House	July 5, 1989 (#89000617)	993 Main St. 42°27′52″N 71°08′43″W		
48	St. Mary's Catholic Church	St. Mary's Catholic Church	July 5, 1989 (#89000625)	159 Washington St. 42°27′15″N 71°07′57″W		
49	Sanborn House	Sanborn House	December 14, 1981 (#81000286)	21 High St. 42°26′44″N 71°09′24″W		
50	Sharon House	Sharon House	July 5, 1989 (#89000613)	403 Main St. 42°26′53″N 71°08′04″W		
51	William Simonds House	William Simonds House	July 5, 1989 (#89000640)	420 Main St. 42°26′56″N 71°08′07″W		
52	Skillings Estate House	Skillings Estate House	July 5, 1989 (#89000645)	37 Rangeley Rd. 42°26′53″N 71°08′29″W		
53	Jacob Stanton House	Jacob Stanton House	July 5, 1989 (#89000614)	21 Washington St. 42°26′59″N 71°08′04″W		
54	Edward Sullivan House	Edward Sullivan House	July 5, 1989 (#89000636)	9 Kendall St. 42°27′10″N 71°07′55″W		
55	Deacon John Symmes House	Deacon John Symmes House	July 5, 1989 (#89000606)	212 Main St. 42°26′29″N 71°08′11″W		
56	Marshall Symmes House	Marshall Symmes House	July 5, 1989 (#89000607)	230 Main St. 42°26′33″N 71°08′12″W		
57	Marshall Symmes Tenant House	Marshall Symmes Tenant House	July 5, 1989 (#89000637)	233 Main St. 42°26′35″N 71°08′11″W		
58	Abijah Thompson House	Abijah Thompson House	July 5, 1989 (#89000619)	81 Walnut St. 42°27′03″N 71°08′19″W		
59	Trowbridge-Badger House	Trowbridge-Badger House	July 5, 1989 (#89000647)	12 Prospect St. 42°26′49″N 71°08′00″W		
60	US Post Office-Winchester Main	US Post Office-Winchester Main	October 19, 1987 (#87001773)	48 Waterfield Rd. 42°27′04″N 71°08′13″W		
61	Alfred Vinton House	Alfred Vinton House	July 5, 1989 (#89000629)	417 Main St. 42°26′55″N 71°08′04″W		
62	Wedgemere Historic District	Wedgemere Historic District	July 5, 1989 (#89000659)	Roughly bounded by Foxcroft, Fletcher, Church, and Cambridge; 42°27′08″N 71°09′02″W		
63	S. B. White House	S. B. White House	July 5, 1989 (#89000622)	8 Stevens St. 42°27′12″N 71°07′51″W		
64	Wildwood Cemetery	Wildwood Cemetery	July 5, 1989 (#89000658)	34 Palmer St. 42°27′17″N 71°08′48″W		
65	Winchester Center Historic District	Winchester Center Historic District	November 21, 1986 (#86002943)	Roughly bounded by Mt. Vernon and Washington Sts., Waterfield Rd., Church and Main Sts. 42°27′07″N 71°08′13″W		
66	Winchester Savings Bank	Winchester Savings Bank	June 19, 1979 (#79000361)	26 Mt. Vernon St. 42°27′12″N 71°08′08″W		
67	Winchester Town Hall	Winchester Town Hall	March 31, 1983 (#83000837)	71 Mount Vernon St. 42°27′09″N 71°08′06″W		
68	Philemon Wright/Asa Locke Farm	Philemon Wright/Asa Locke Farm	March 10, 1983 (#83000838)	78 Ridge St. 42°26′29″N 71°10′35″W		
69	George Wyman House	George Wyman House	July 5, 1989 (#89000609)	195 Cambridge St. 42°27′09″N 71°09′29″W		
