= Jacob Stanton House =

Historic house in Massachusetts, United States

- U.S. National Register of Historic Places
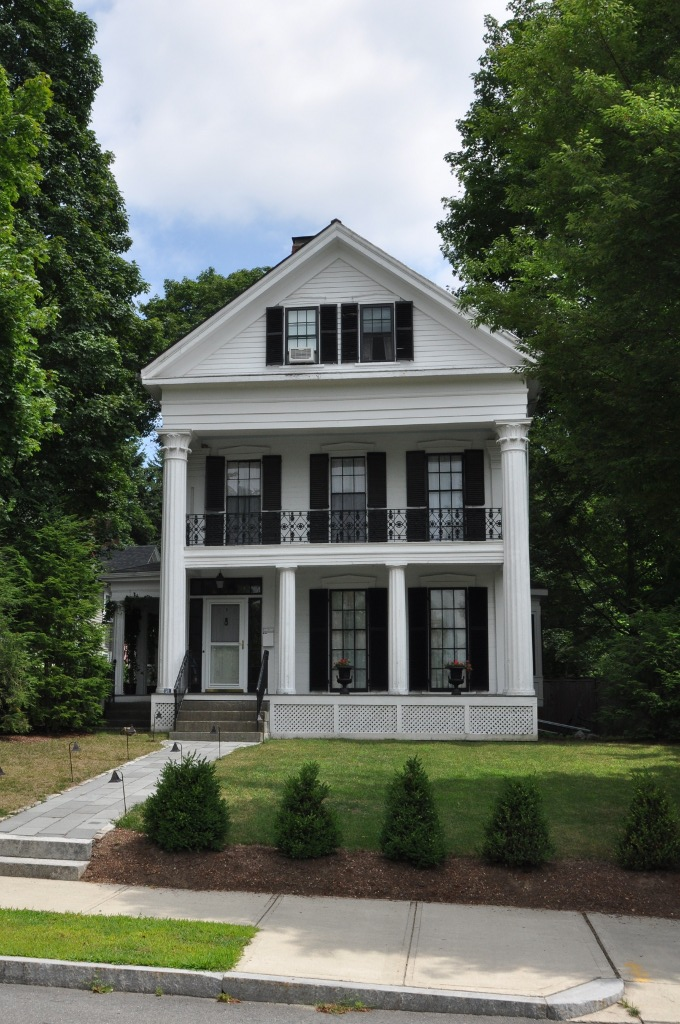

- Location within Massachusetts Location within the United States
- Location: 21 Washington Street, Winchester, Massachusetts
- Coordinates: 42°26′59″N 71°8′4″W
- Built: 1840
- Architectural style: Greek Revival
- MPS: Winchester MRA
- NRHP reference No.: 89000614
- Added to NRHP: July 5, 1989

The Jacob Stanton House is a historic house in Winchester, Massachusetts, United States. It is a 2 1/2-story wood-frame house with a gabled front portico supported by two-story smooth columns. The main facade and the gable end are finished in flushboarding, and the second-story balcony features an ironwork railing. The house was built c. 1840 by Deacon Nathan Brooks Johnson, a local blacksmith who may have made the balcony railings. It is Winchester's only high-style temple-front Greek Revival house. After Johnson's death it was purchased by Jacob Stanton, who built the Brown & Stanton Block in downtown Winchester.

The house was listed on the National Register of Historic Places in 1989.

== See also ==
- National Register of Historic Places listings in Winchester, Massachusetts
