= Trowbridge-Badger House =

Historic house in Massachusetts, United States

- U.S. National Register of Historic Places
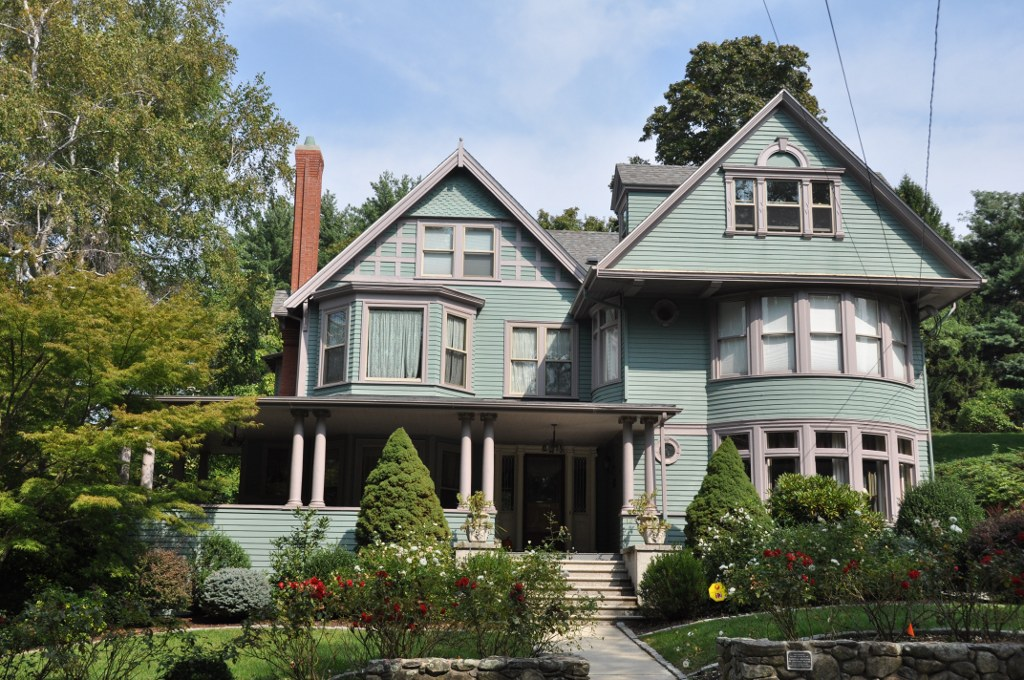

- Location within Massachusetts Location within the United States
- Location: 12 Prospect Street, Winchester, Massachusetts
- Coordinates: 42°26′49″N 71°8′0″W
- Built: 1886
- Architectural style: Colonial Revival, Queen Anne
- MPS: Winchester MRA
- NRHP reference No.: 89000647
- Added to NRHP: July 5, 1989

The Trowbridge-Badger House is a historic house in Winchester, Massachusetts. The large 2.5-story house was built c. 1886, and is an excellent local representative of predominantly Queen Anne styling with Colonial Revival features. The house's irregular roof line, with many gables and projecting sections, is typically Queen Anne, while the shingled porch with Tuscan columns is Colonial Revival. Little is known of its early owners beyond their names.

The house was listed on the National Register of Historic Places in 1989.

== See also ==
- National Register of Historic Places listings in Winchester, Massachusetts
