= Firth–Glengarry Historic District =

Historic district in Massachusetts, United States

- U.S. National Register of Historic Places
- U.S. Historic district
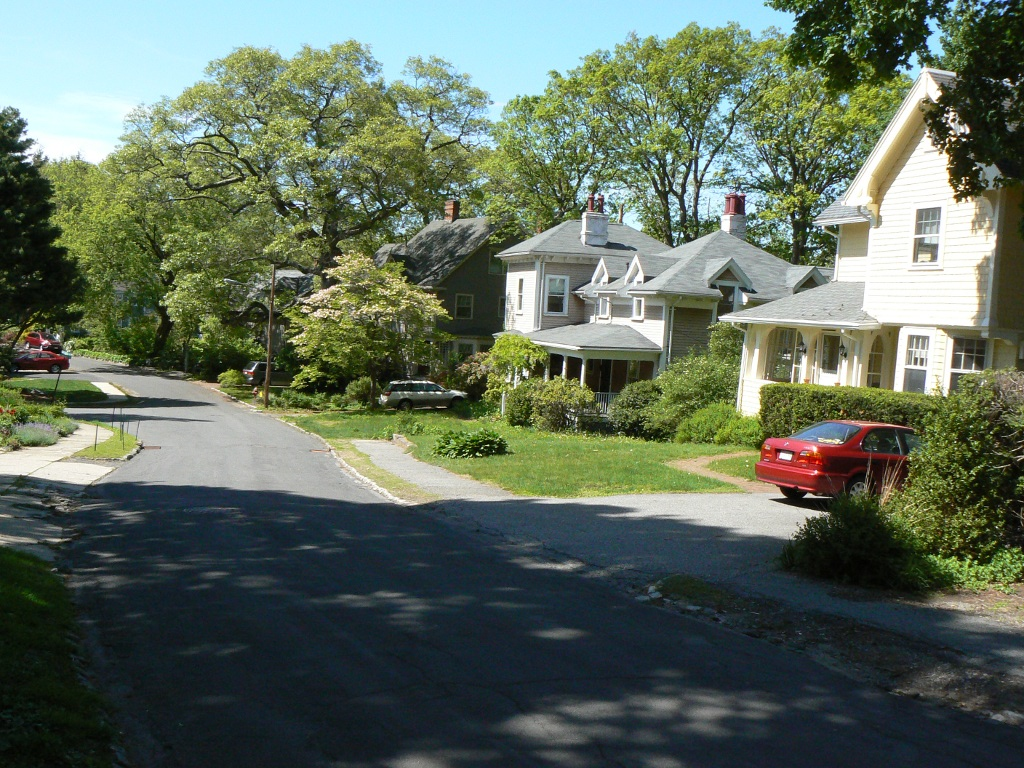
- Grassmere Street

- Location within Massachusetts Location within the United States
- Location: Winchester, Massachusetts
- Coordinates: 42°27′5″N 71°8′38″W
- Area: 13.44 acres (5.44 ha)
- Architectural style: Colonial Revival, Queen Anne, Shingle Style
- MPS: Winchester MRA
- NRHP reference No.: 89000662
- Added to NRHP: July 5, 1989

The Firth–Glengarry Historic District encompasses a residential area of Winchester, Massachusetts consisting of well-preserved high quality houses built mainly between 1880 and 1900. The district lies between Wildwood Street and Wedge Pond, and includes properties on Pine Street, Glengarry Road, Grassmere Avenue, Dix Street, and Wildwood Street; houses on Curtis Street and Curtis Circle, are excluded from the district. Much of the area was laid out by developer William Firth, and many of its houses were designed by Boston architect Robert Coit. The 13.44-acre (5.44 ha) district was listed on the National Register of Historic Places in 1989.

Prior to William Firth's consolidation of land ownership southwest of Wedge Pond in the late 19th century, this area of Winchester was sparsely inhabited. The oldest house in the area is an 1843 Greek Revival structure at 3 Wildwood Street. Two houses were built near Wedge Pond in the 1850s and 1860s, of which the Charles Curtis House (1965, 9-11 Grassmere Avenue) is a particularly fine example of Carpenter Gothic; the Bellows House, built in 1854, is also Gothic Revival in character. In the 1880s and early 1890s three Queen Anne/Stick style houses were built, of which the Langley House (1887) at 10 Pine Street is the most elaborate.

After Firth had acquired most of the land in the area, he subdivided into ample house lots, and laid out Glengarry Road and Grassmere Avenue. He hired Robert Coit to design houses which are predominantly Colonial Revival and Medieval Revival (Tudor) in character. Coit's designs used shingling to a significant degree, and mixed in features from other popular revival styles. Firth's own house at 37 Dix Street, built in 1937, is, however, a relatively straightforward Colonial Revival design, with a gambrel roof and modillioned cornice, and with gable dormers and a full-width front porch supported by Doric columns.

== See also ==
- National Register of Historic Places listings in Winchester, Massachusetts
