= S. B. White House =

Historic house in Massachusetts, United States

- U.S. National Register of Historic Places
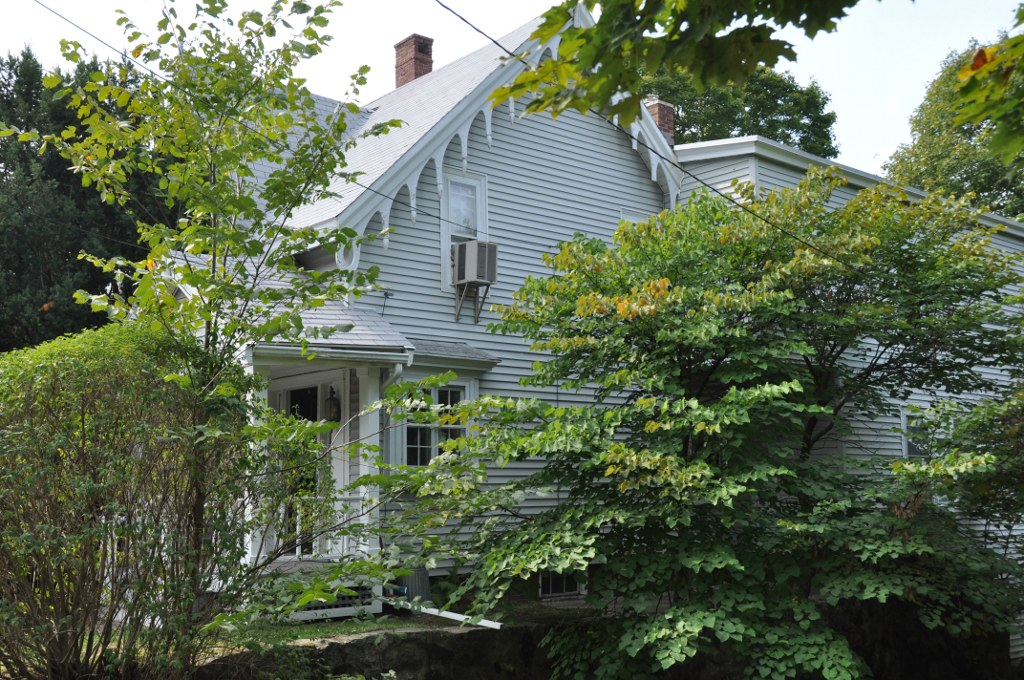

- Location within Massachusetts Location within the United States
- Location: 8 Stevens Street, Winchester, Massachusetts
- Coordinates: 42°27′12″N 71°7′51″W
- Built: 1850
- Architectural style: Gothic Revival
- MPS: Winchester MRA
- NRHP reference No.: 89000622
- Added to NRHP: July 5, 1989

The S. B. White House is a historic house in Winchester, Massachusetts. The 1 1/2-story wood-frame house was built in the early 1850s, and is one of the finest local examples of Gothic Revival architecture. Its exterior is finished in clapboards, and its steeply pitched gables are decorated with icicle-like vergeboard. Its entry is flanked by sidelight windows and sheltered by porch added later. The house was built and owned by Samuel B. White, Jr., who served as Winchester's first town treasurer.

The house was listed on the National Register of Historic Places in 1989.

== See also ==
- National Register of Historic Places listings in Winchester, Massachusetts
