= Edward Sullivan House =

Historic house in Massachusetts, United States

- U.S. National Register of Historic Places
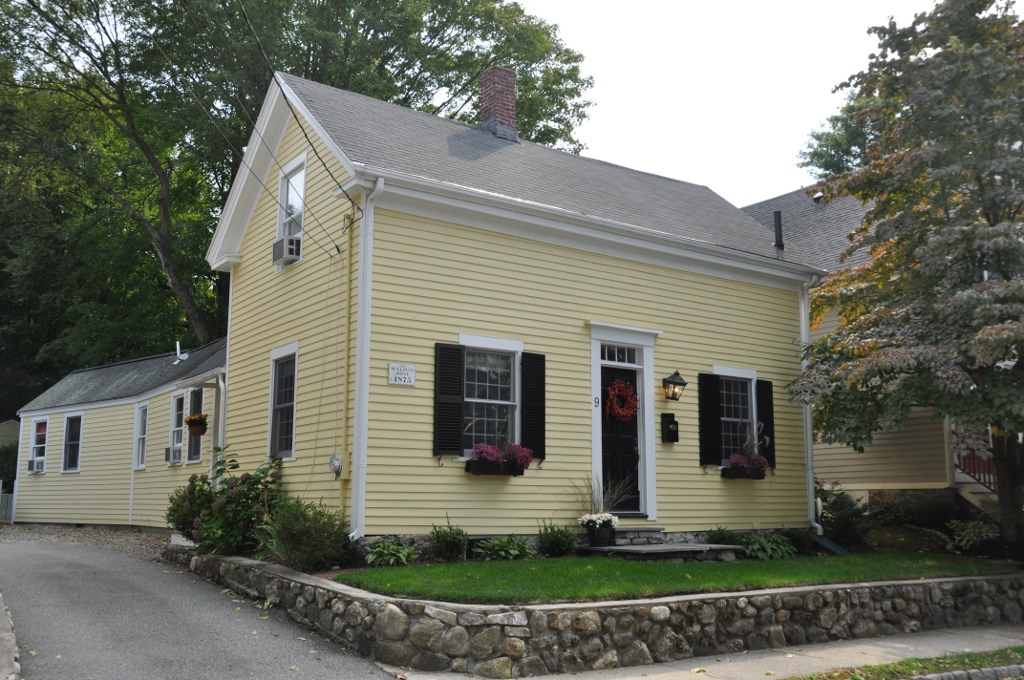

- Location within Massachusetts Location within the United States
- Location: 9 Kendall Street, Winchester, Massachusetts
- Coordinates: 42°27′10″N 71°7′55″W
- Built: 1875
- Architectural style: Italianate
- MPS: Winchester MRA
- NRHP reference No.: 89000636
- Added to NRHP: July 5, 1989

The Edward Sullivan House is a historic house in Winchester, Massachusetts. This small, 1 1/2 story house was built around 1875, and is the best-preserved example of a 19th-century worker's cottage in the town. It is three bays wide, with a side-gable roof, and simple vernacular Italianate styling. It has almost no exterior architectural styling, except for a transom window and modest entablature over the front door. The house is one of five owned by Edward Sullivan, a stonemason, and is located near St. Mary's Catholic Church, an area where many Irish immigrants sought to settle.

The house was listed on the National Register of Historic Places in 1989.

== See also ==
- National Register of Historic Places listings in Winchester, Massachusetts
