= Oak Knoll (Winchester, Massachusetts) =

Historic house in Massachusetts, United States

- U.S. National Register of Historic Places
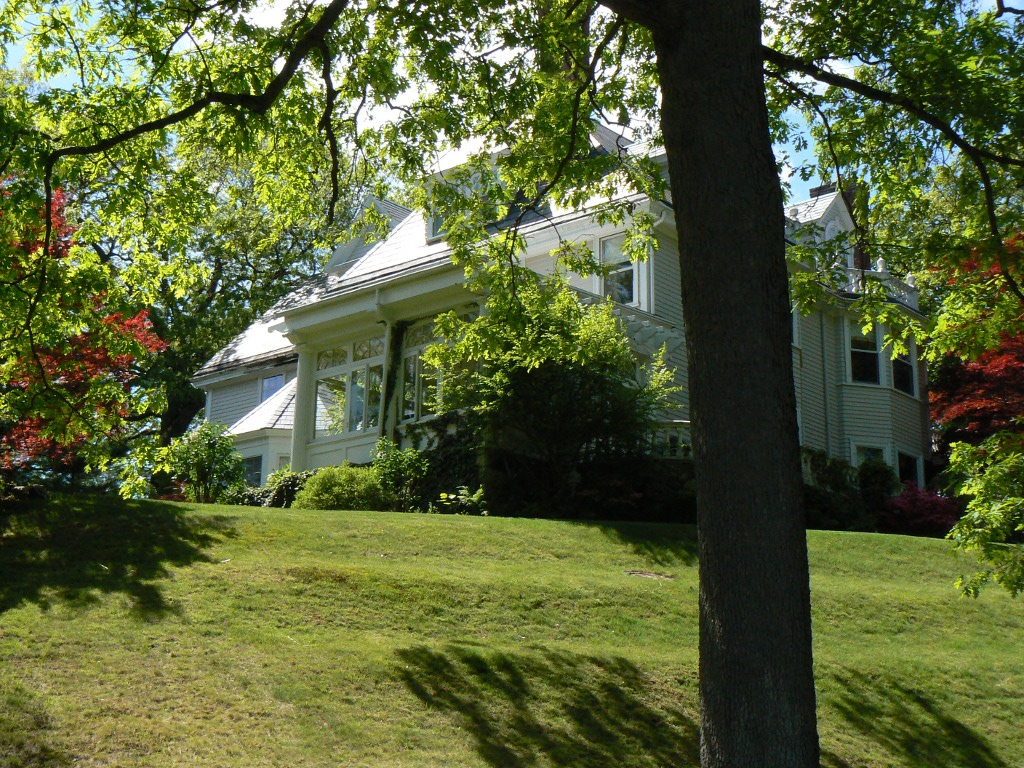

- Location within Massachusetts Location within the United States
- Location: 17 Brooks Street, Winchester, Massachusetts
- Coordinates: 42°26′25″N 71°8′21″W
- Area: 4 acres (1.6 ha)
- Built: 1893
- Architectural style: Colonial Revival, Queen Anne
- MPS: Winchester MRA
- NRHP reference No.: 89000648
- Added to NRHP: July 5, 1989

Oak Knoll is a historic estate house in Winchester, Massachusetts. This large Queen Anne/Colonial Revival house was built in the early 1890s by Lewis Parkhurst, a partner in the publishing house of Winchester resident Edwin Ginn. Parkhurst's mansion is the last surviving late 19th-century mansion house in Winchester. The house was listed on the National Register of Historic Places in 1989.

== Description and history ==
Oak Knoll is set on a large lot at the center of a rough circle formed by Brooks Street and Grove Street in a residential area of southern Winchester. It has a setting at the top of a low hill, whose drama has been reduced somewhat by encroaching development. It is a large 2 1/2-story wood-frame structure, with asymmetrical massing and busy slate roof typical of the Queen Anne style. The roof is pierced by four brick chimneys with corbelled tops, another Queen Anne hallmark. The main entrance is located on the eastern side in a corner between cross-gable sections, sheltered by a porch with Colonial Revival detailing.

The house stands on land that once belonged to the locally prominent Symmes family. The land was purchased in 1891 by Lewis Parkhurst, who served as Winchester High School principal before joining the publishing firm of Edwin Ginn. He was active in civic affairs, representing the town in the state senate, and serving as president of Middlesex National Bank, the town's first commercial bank. Parkhurst School, built in 1949, was named in his honor.

== See also ==
- National Register of Historic Places listings in Winchester, Massachusetts
