= Louis N. Maxwell House =

Historic house in Massachusetts, United States

- U.S. National Register of Historic Places
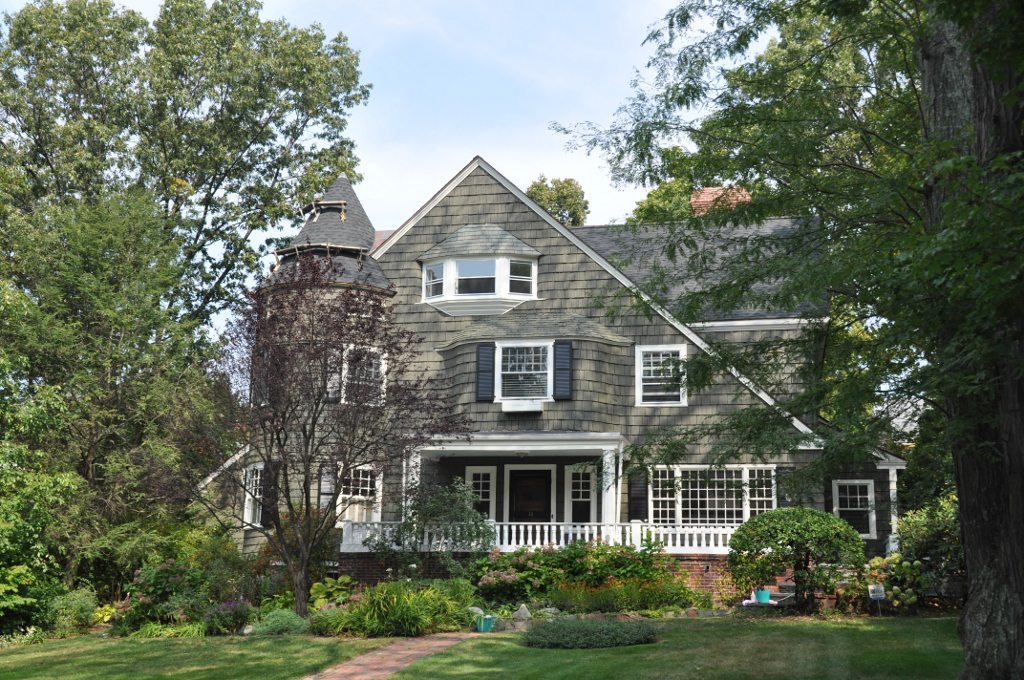

- Location within Massachusetts Location within the United States
- Location: 16 Herrick Street, Winchester, Massachusetts
- Coordinates: 42°26′47″N 71°7′57″W
- Built: 1890
- Architectural style: Shingle Style
- MPS: Winchester MRA
- NRHP reference No.: 89000650
- Added to NRHP: July 5, 1989

The Louis N. Maxwell House is a historic house in Winchester, Massachusetts. The 2.5-story wood-frame house was built c. 1890 for Louis N. Maxwell, and is one of the finest examples of Shingle style architecture in Winchester. Although the main roof ridge is parallel to the street, the front facade presents a cross gable with roof line that sweeps down to the first floor. The entry is recessed behind a porch area underneath this gable, and there is a turret with conical roof to the gable's left.

The house was listed on the National Register of Historic Places in 1989.

== See also ==
- National Register of Historic Places listings in Winchester, Massachusetts
