= Samuel Elder House =

Historic house in Massachusetts, United States

- U.S. National Register of Historic Places
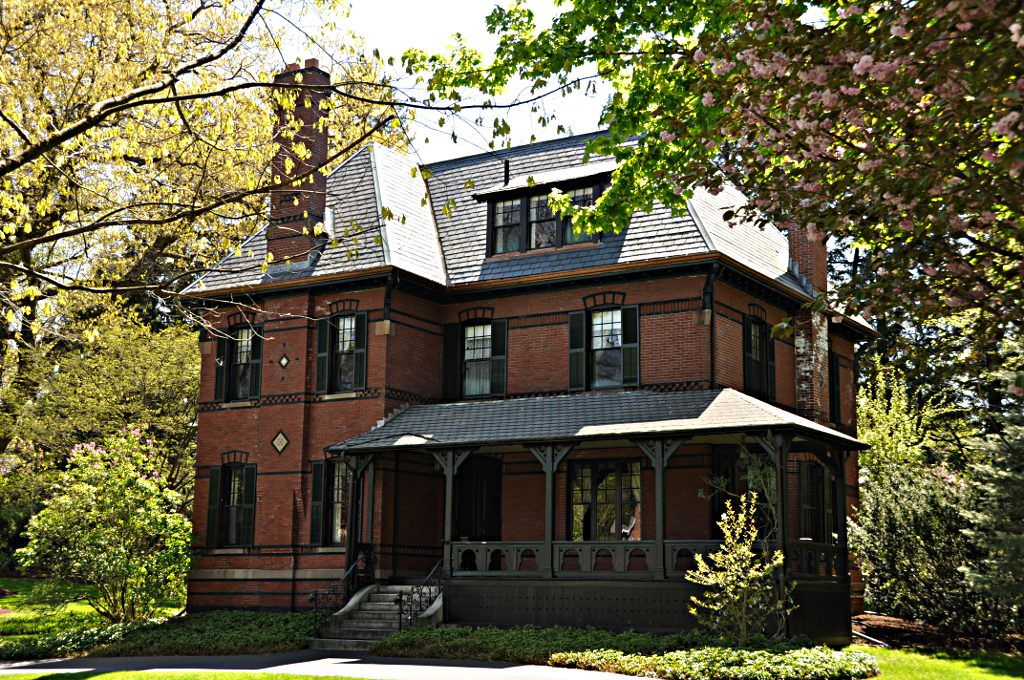

- Location within Massachusetts Location within the United States
- Location: Winchester, Massachusetts
- Coordinates: 42°26′51″N 71°8′30″W
- Built: 1876
- Architect: George Dutton Rand
- Architectural style: Ruskinian Gothic
- MPS: Winchester MRA
- NRHP reference No.: 89000643
- Added to NRHP: July 5, 1989

The historic house at 38 Rangeley Road in Winchester, Massachusetts is one of three Panel Brick in an exclusive late 19th century subdivision. The house was listed on the National Register of Historic Places in 1989 as the Samuel Elder House, on the incorrect belief that it was the home of Samuel Elder, a prominent Boston lawyer.

== Description and history ==
The Rangeley Estate subdivision was a high-end residential development, located southwest of Winchester center on the west side of the railroad tracks. The land was purchased by David Skillings, a lumber businessman from Maine, and developed by him into an exclusive gated development known as Rangeley Park (its wall and pillars that supported a gate are still visible on Church Street, at the northern end of the development). This house was built by Skillings in 1875–76 as a rental property. The house has incorrectly been described as the residence of Samuel J. Elder, one of the founding editors of The Yale Record, the world's oldest humor magazine. This error occurred because the street number of the house is 38, but the number 38 had earlier been associated with a different house in the Rangeley neighborhood where Samuel Elder lived.

The house is set on a sweeping curve of Rangeley Road in the southern part of the Skillings development, opposite Meadowcroft Road. It is a 2 1/2-story brick structure, built in a Ruskinian Gothic style to a design by George Dutton Rand. It is faced in polychrome (red and black) brick, with additional trim elements in brownstone. The main facade is asymmetrical, with the entrance set in a segmented-arch opening. A single-story porch extends across the facade, supported by bracketed posts, with a balustrade with a jigsawn trefoil pattern.

== See also ==
- National Register of Historic Places listings in Winchester, Massachusetts
