= Henry Grover House =

Historic house in Massachusetts, United States

- U.S. National Register of Historic Places
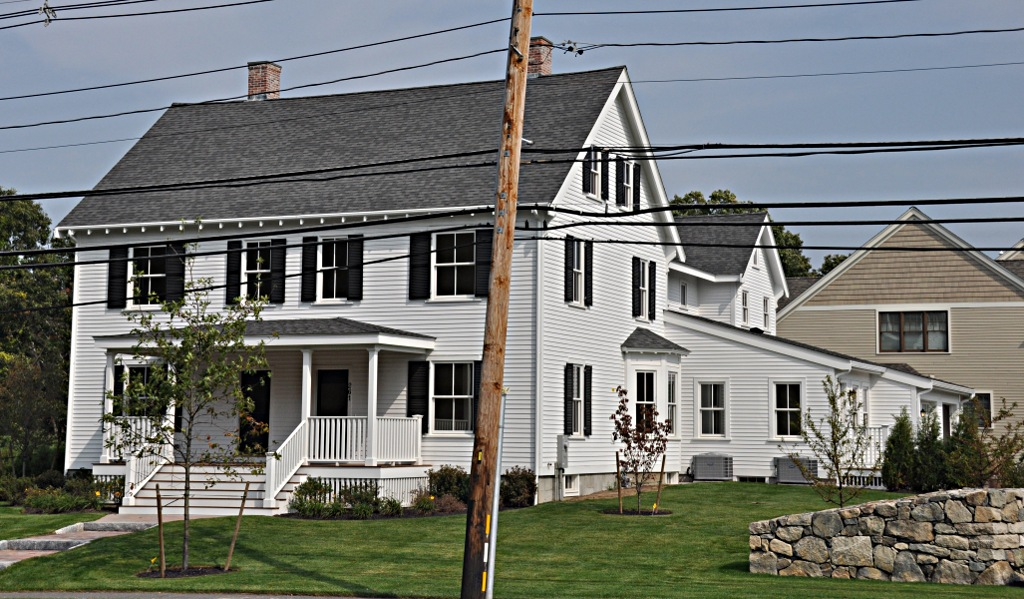

- Location within Massachusetts Location within the United States
- Location: Winchester, Massachusetts
- Coordinates: 42°27′13″N 71°9′31″W
- Built: 1885
- MPS: Winchester MRA
- NRHP reference No.: 89000641
- Added to NRHP: July 5, 1989

The Henry Grover House is a historic house at 223–225 Cambridge Street in Winchester, Massachusetts. The wood-frame 2 1/2-story double house was built in the 1880s by Henry Grover, who farmed 25 acres (10 ha) of surrounding land. In the late 20th century, the Purcell family operated a flower stand on the property known as "Purcell's Pansy Patch". When the site was developed for housing beginning in 2009, the house was rehabilitated as part of the development.

The house was built in 1885 and added to the National Register of Historic Places in 1989.

== See also ==
- National Register of Historic Places listings in Winchester, Massachusetts
