= George Wyman House =

Historic house in Massachusetts, United States

- U.S. National Register of Historic Places
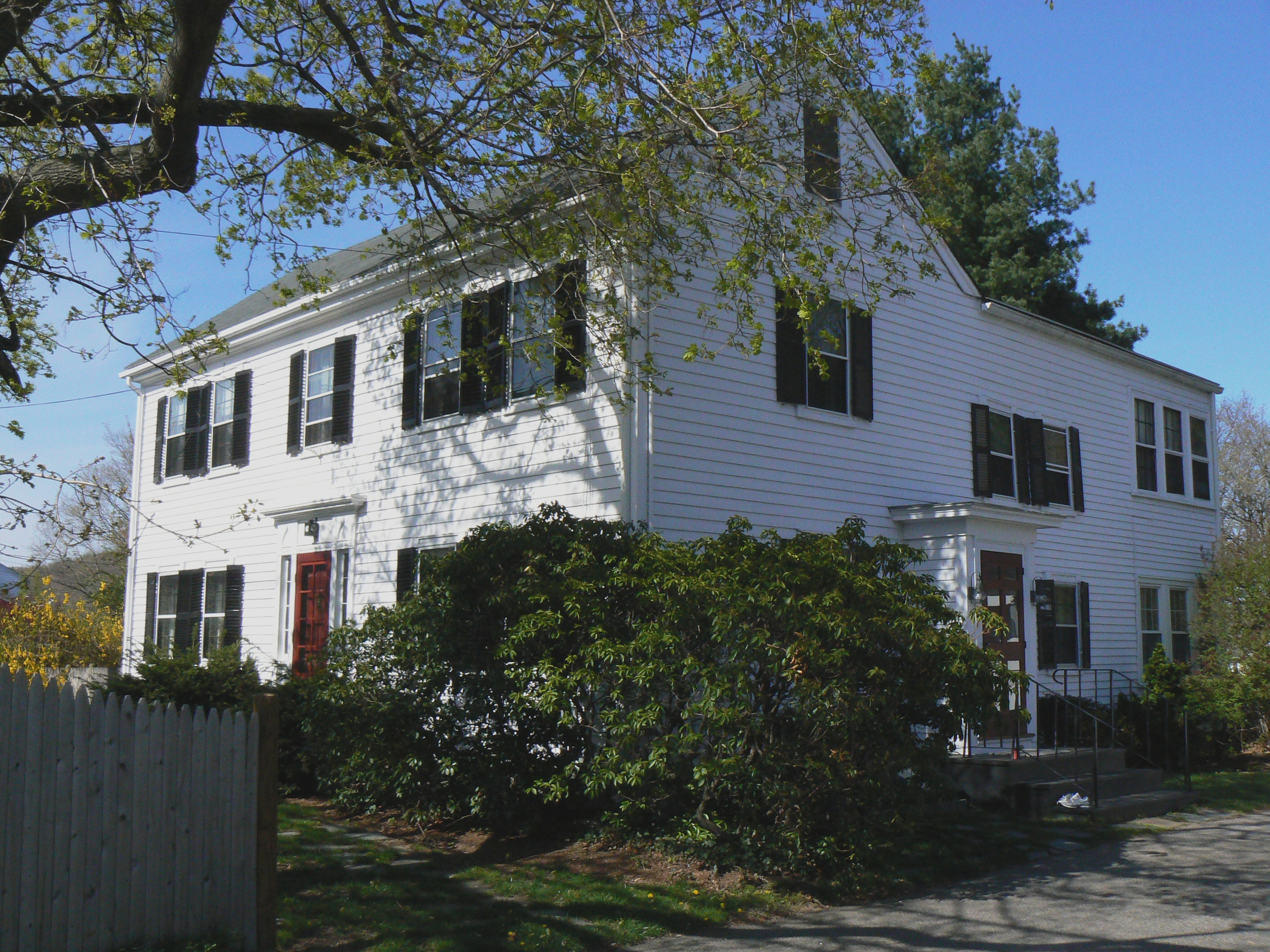

- Location within Massachusetts Location within the United States
- Location: 195 Cambridge Street, Winchester, Massachusetts
- Coordinates: 42°27′9″N 71°9′29″W
- Built: 1825
- Architectural style: Greek Revival, Federal
- MPS: Winchester MRA
- NRHP reference No.: 89000609
- Added to NRHP: July 5, 1989

The George Wyman House is a historic house in Winchester, Massachusetts. The 2.5-story wood-frame house was built in the late 1820s, and is a rare local example of transitional Federal-Greek Revival styling. Basically Federal in its form, with side gable roof and five bay front, its center entry with full-length sidelights is more Greek Revival in character. The house was built by George Wyman near the site of one of the first houses to be built in what is now Winchester (c. 1660).

The house was listed on the National Register of Historic Places in 1989.

== See also ==
- National Register of Historic Places listings in Winchester, Massachusetts
