= Webster Childs House =

Historic house in Massachusetts, United States

- U.S. National Register of Historic Places
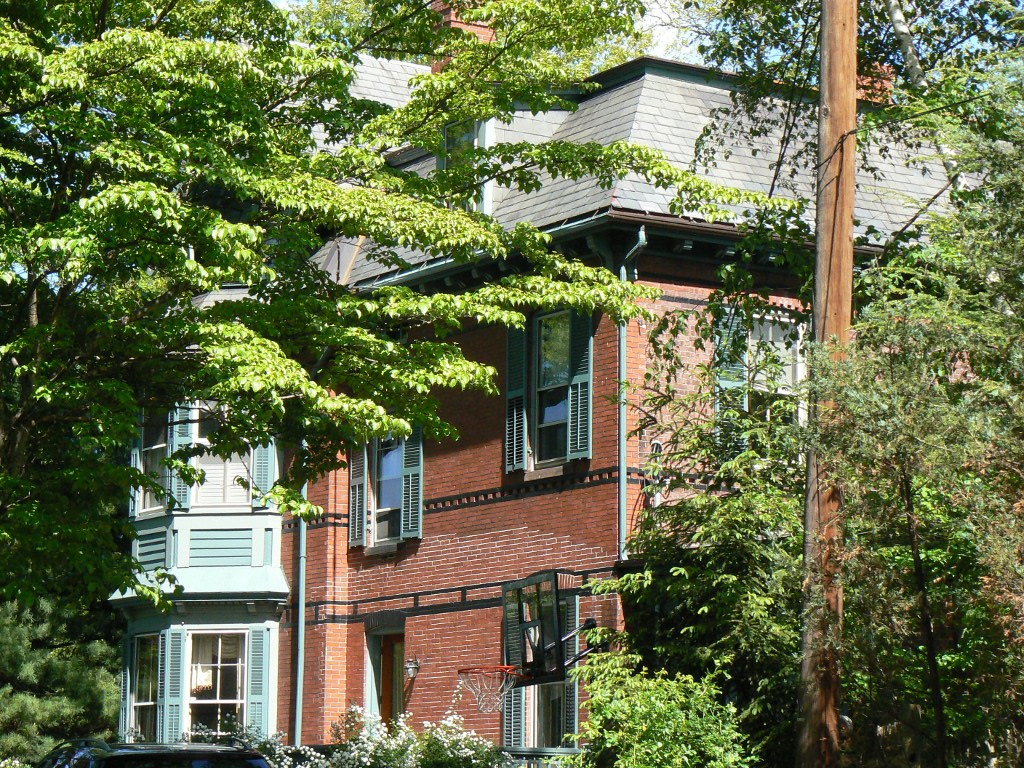

- Location within Massachusetts Location within the United States
- Location: 9 Meadowcroft Road, Winchester, Massachusetts
- Coordinates: 42°26′49″N 71°8′27″W
- Built: 1876
- Architect: George Dutton Rand
- Architectural style: Queen Anne
- MPS: Winchester MRA
- NRHP reference No.: 89000644
- Added to NRHP: July 5, 1989

The Webster Childs House is a historic house in Winchester, Massachusetts. Built about 1876 by a Maine lumber magnate as part of the exclusive Rangeley Estate, it is one three examples of Panel Brick Queen Anne architecture in the town. The house was listed on the National Register of Historic Places in 1989.

== Description and history ==
The Rangeley Estate subdivision was a high-end residential development, located southwest of Winchester center on the west side of the railroad tracks. The land was purchased by David Skilling, a lumber businessman from Maine, and developed by him into an exclusive gated development (its wall and a gate are still visible on Church Street, at the northern end of the development). This house was built by Skilling as a rental property, and was purchased in 1889 by Webster Child, a piano manufacturer.

The Childs House is set well back from Meadowcroft Road, on the southern edge of Skilling's development. It is a 2 1/2-story brick structure, with a mansard roof and Stick style decoration in projecting gable sections. The walls are polychrome brick (mainly red and black), and windows are set in segmented-arch openings with sawtooth brickwork. The main facade is symmetrically arranged, with a central projecting pavilion topped by a gable with a trefoil and a pointed-arch window. The entrance is set in a segmented-arch opening in the pavilion, sheltered by a single-story porch.

== See also ==
- National Register of Historic Places listings in Winchester, Massachusetts
