= Ginn Gardener's House =

Historic house in Massachusetts, United States

- U.S. National Register of Historic Places
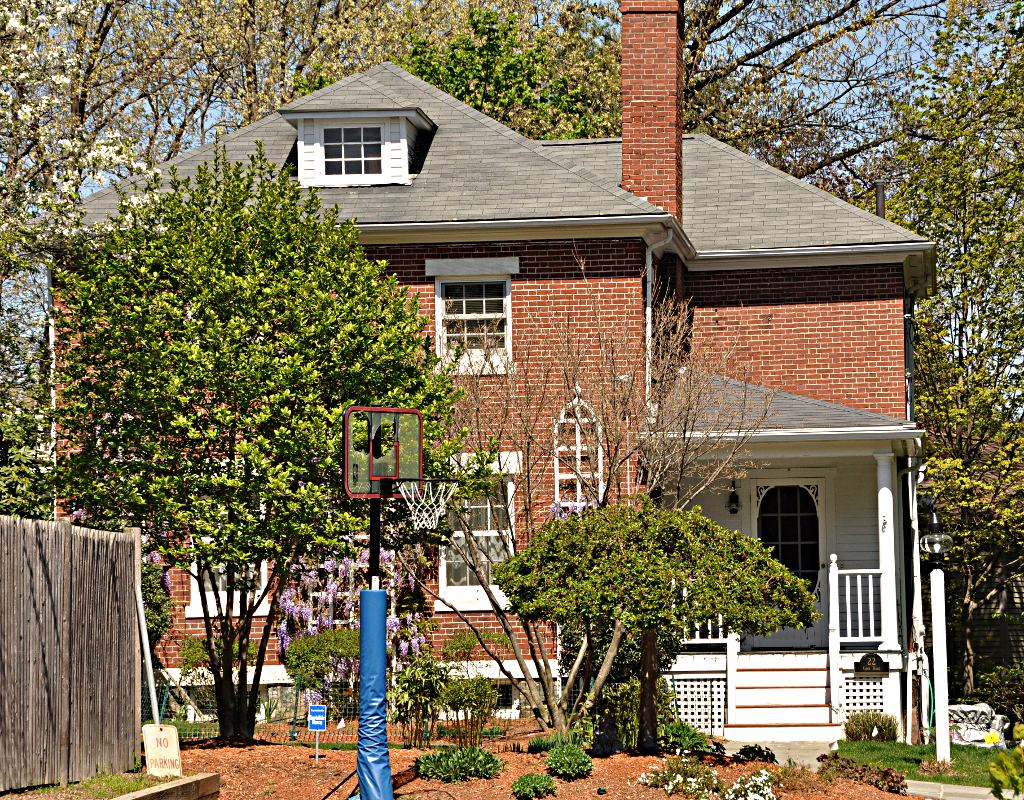

- Location within Massachusetts Location within the United States
- Location: 22 Ginn Road, Winchester, Massachusetts
- Coordinates: 42°26′47″N 71°8′26″W
- Built: 1900
- Architectural style: Colonial Revival
- MPS: Winchester MRA
- NRHP reference No.: 89000654
- Added to NRHP: July 5, 1989

The Ginn Gardener's House is a historic house in Winchester, Massachusetts. It is one of two surviving outbuildings (the other is the carriage house) of the extensive "Terrace of Oaks" estate of publisher Edwin Ginn, whose main house was demolished in 1946. The two-story brick gardener's house, built in 1900, shows the high quality of the estate and its Georgian Revival character. Its brickwork is laid in Flemish bond, with a water table and trim elements of marble. The five-bay facade has a center entry, which is sheltered by a square portico, supported by Tuscan columns and topped by a low railing with turned balusters. Above the entry is a shallow gable, below which is a large round-arch window.

The house was listed on the National Register of Historic Places in 1989.

== See also ==
- National Register of Historic Places listings in Winchester, Massachusetts
