= Arcangelo Cascieri =

American sculptor

- Born: February 22, 1902; Province of Pescara, Italy
- Died: January 14, 1997 (aged 94)
- Education: Boston Architectural Center; Boston University
- Occupation: Sculptor
- Parent(s): Corrado Cascieri; Maria Cascieri

Arcangelo "Angelo" Cascieri (February 22, 1902 – January 14, 1997) was an influential sculptor and a major figure in the evolution of the Boston Architectural College in Boston, Massachusetts.

== Early life ==
Cascieri was born in Pescara province, Italy in 1902 to Corrado and Maria Cascieri. Arcangelo's father was a cabinet maker with the ability to send wireless messages for the town. Arcangelo's mother received no formal education, although she excelled in the ways of the home such as cooking and weaving. When Arcangelo was three, his mother gave birth to another son, named Tito. Soon after, Corrado left the family to move to Boston's North End in hopes of finding wealth and prosperity.

In 1907, Maria and her sons joined Corrado in Boston, after a lengthy trip across the Atlantic by boat. The family welcomed another child, Mary Dominica, in 1908. Eventually, the family chose to leave the North End in favor of East Boston, which Corrado felt was more similar to their hometown in Italy. It was at this time that Arcangelo began attending school and learning English, although his family continued to speak Italian at home.

== Apprenticeship ==
In his early teens, Arcangelo was taken out of school and sent to work in the shipping room at a shoe factory in order to help the family financially. During this time, Arcangelo learned woodworking and began to carve. As his ability increased, Arcangelo was approached to be an apprentice to Johannes Kirchmayer, chief sculptor at W.F. Ross Studio in Cambridge. As an apprentice to Kirchmayer, Arcangelo met many sculptors and carvers from all over the world who had settled in the Boston area, including such notables as Joseph Gabler and Natale Giacone. It was also Kirchmayer who told Arcangelo about the Boston Architectural Club, the institution in which he would be involved for the rest of his life.

== Formal education and the BAC ==
In 1922, Arcangelo began studying at the Boston Architectural Center and finished the program in four years, graduating a year early. After graduating, he chose to study at the School of Fine Arts at Boston University until 1936. In 1937, Arcangelo became the head of the Boston Architectural Center. In 1943, Arcangelo was appointed Dean of the Boston Architectural Center and throughout the 1940s, the school continued to grow. Notable architects such as Buckminster Fuller and Frank Lloyd Wright lectured at the Center.

== Personal projects ==
Because all of the faculty lectured on a volunteer basis, Arcangelo supported himself as a sculptor, opening a studio with his brother-in-law, Adio diBiccari, in 1952. Together, they were involved in several large projects throughout the world including the American World War I Memorial at Belleau Wood in France and the World War II Memorial at Margraten in the Netherlands. Many of their works can be seen in Boston, the most famous being the Parkman Plaza fountain in Boston Common.

== Later years ==
In 1976, the school, undergoing a major change, began to grant degrees. At the same time, the formal Work Curriculum Program began, which allowed students to work in architecture firms during the day and attend class at night. This was a very different style of learning from other American architecture programs and it is a feature that continues to make the BAC unique today. Dean Cascieri remained an important figure at the school until shortly before his death in 1997.
