= Athenaeum Press =

- Athenæum Press
- U.S. National Register of Historic Places
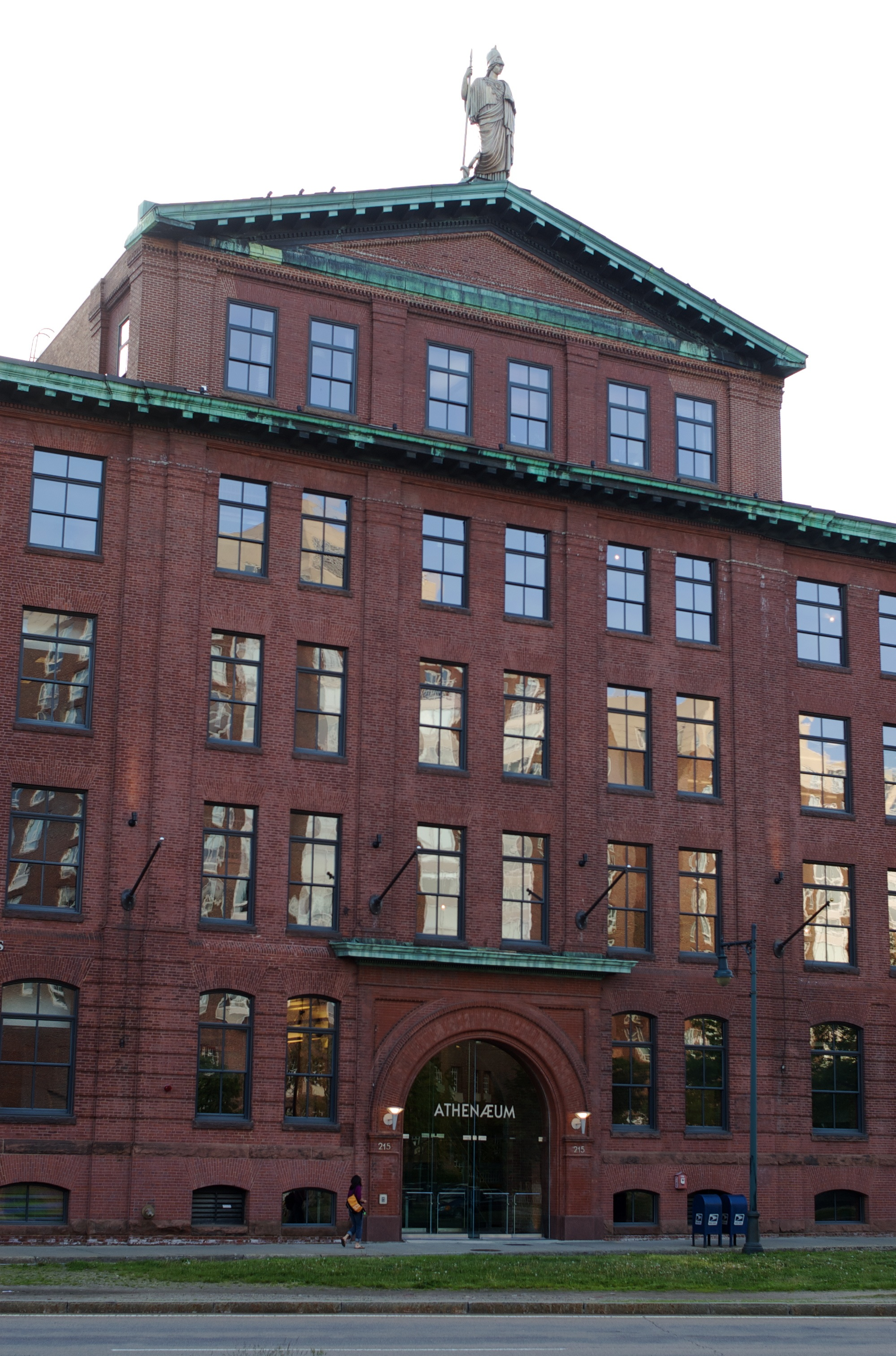
- View of the Athenaeum Press in 2009.

- Location within Massachusetts Location within the United States
- Location: 215 First Street; Cambridge, Massachusetts 02142
- Coordinates: 42.364200°N 71.0793°W
- Built: 1895
- Architect: Lockwood, Greene, and Company
- MPS: Cambridge MRA
- NRHP reference No.: 82001917
- Added to NRHP: April 13, 1982

Athenæum Press is an historic building located at 215 First Street in Cambridge, Massachusetts. The structure occupies the entire block between First Street, Second Street, Athenæum Street, and Linskey Way, which was formerly known as Munroe Street. Topped by a statue of Athena sculpted by Adio diBiccari, the building is visible from the nearby Charles River and the Longfellow Bridge.

== History ==
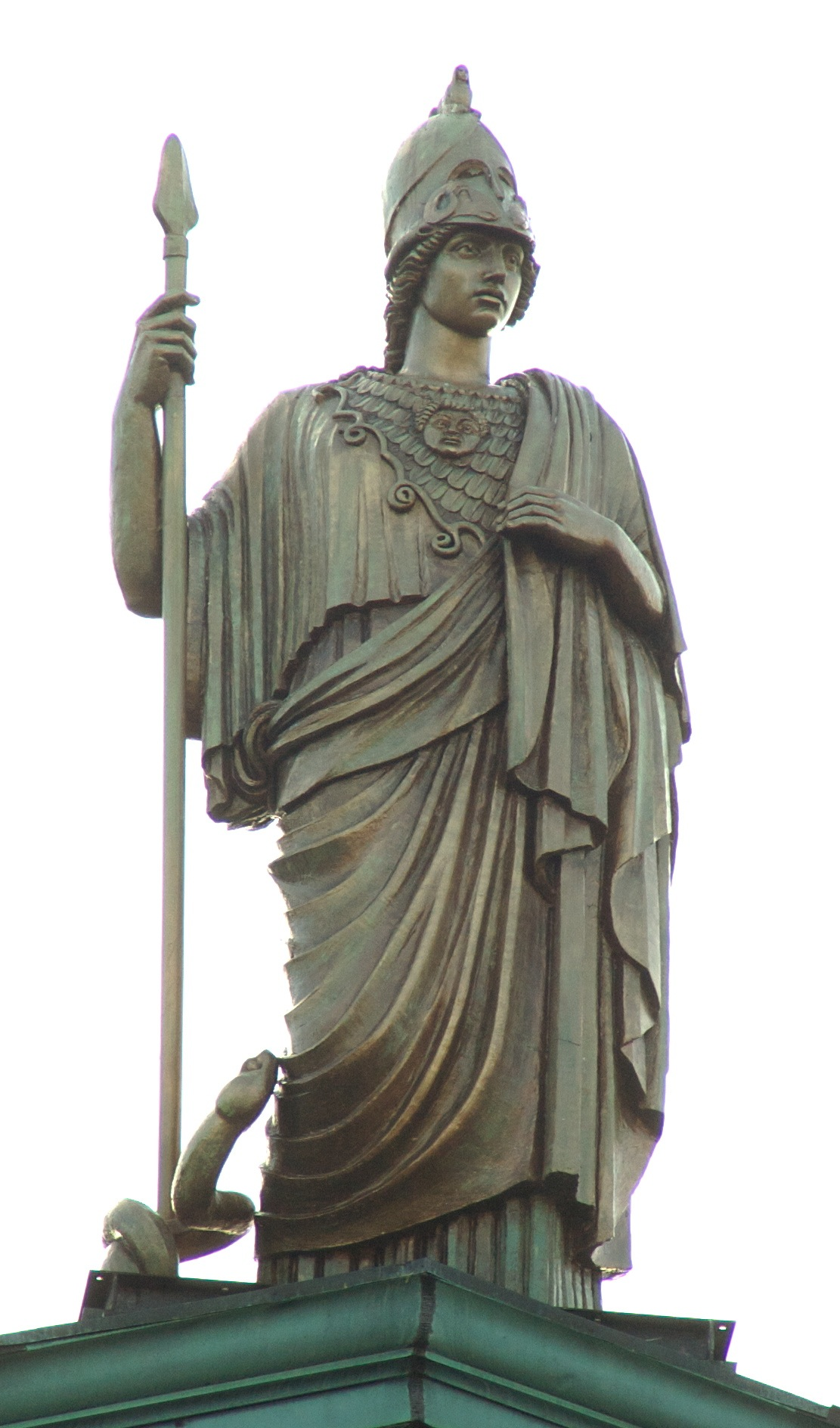
View of the sculpture of Athena atop the Press.

The Athenæum Press was designed by the architecture firm, Lockwood, Greene, and Company, with tile vaults designed by the Guastavino Company. The building was completed in 1895. The structure was built for Edwin Ginn and Ginn & Company to house its printing operations, and was built using principles of late nineteenth-century textile mill construction. Due to its highly visible location, the building was given a number of stylistic embellishments, including a large sculpture of Athena designed by Adio diBiccari. The front of the building resembles an Ancient Greek temple implemented in brick, patinated copper, and glass. The building was listed on the National Register of Historic Places in 1982. The building was the third major printing house built in Cambridge (after those of Harvard University Press and Riverside Press), and one of the first major industrial sites on Cambridge's riverfront.

The building has 380,000 square feet (35,000 m^{2}) of floor space and was renovated circa 2005. The facility was used for many years to print textbooks. Ginn & Company later became part of Pearson Education.

The building is now owned by BioMed Realty, and used for commercial and laboratory space. As of 2026, current occupants include the Cambridge Athletic Club, Partners HealthCare Innovation, the Lean Enterprise Institute, SAGE Therapeutics, Constellation Pharmaceuticals, Active Site Research, and several other small businesses.

== See also ==
- National Register of Historic Places listings in Cambridge, Massachusetts
