= Newbury Street =

Street in Boston, Massachusetts

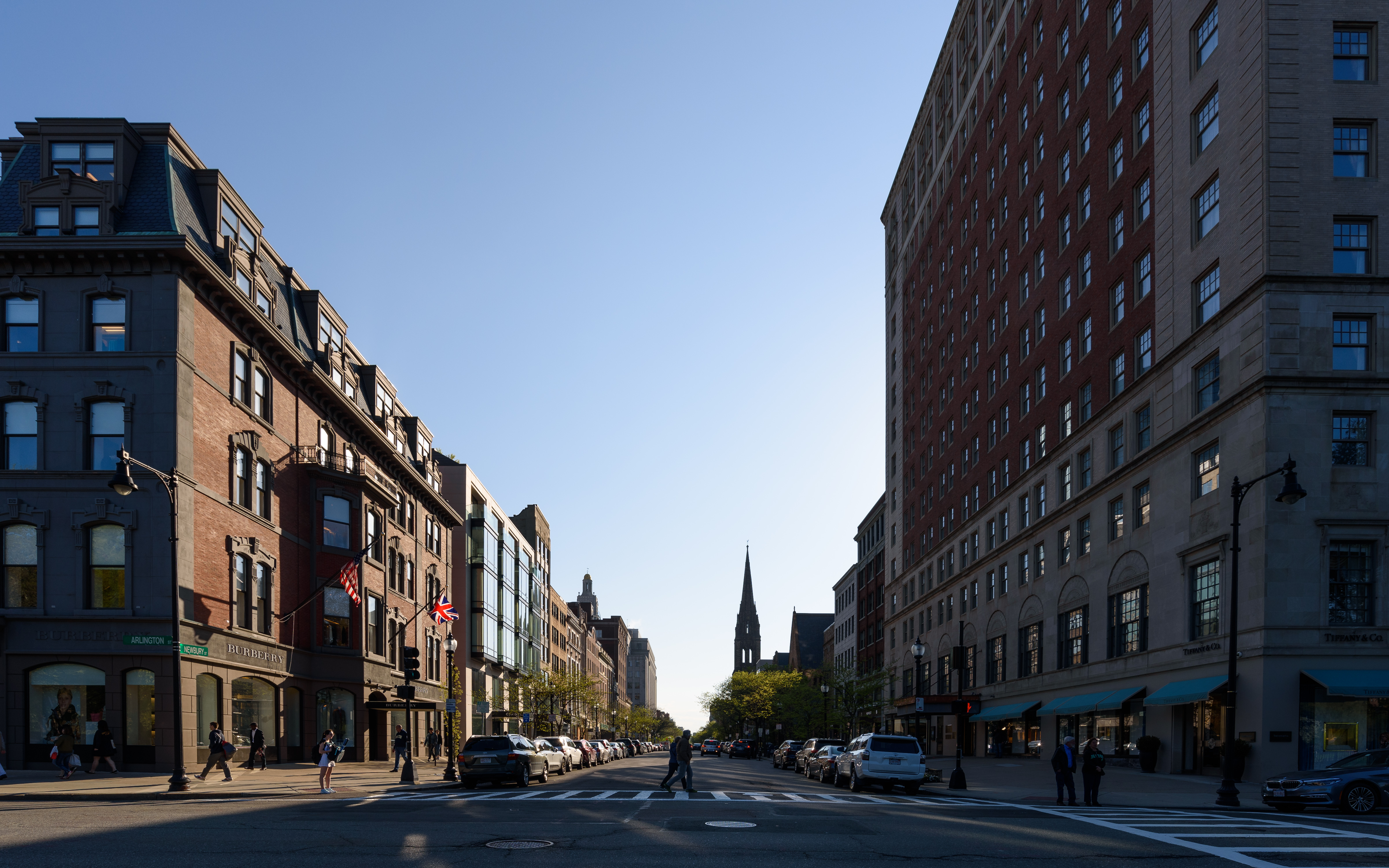
- Newbury Street (westbound) at Arlington Street, near Boston Public Garden
- Interactive map of Newbury Street
- Location: Boston, Massachusetts
- Coordinates: 42°20′57″N 71°5′3″W
- East end: Arlington Street
- West end: Brookline Avenue

Newbury Street is located in the Back Bay area of Boston, Massachusetts, in the United States. It runs roughly east–west, from the Boston Public Garden to Brookline Avenue. The road crosses several major arteries along its path, with an entrance to the Massachusetts Turnpike westbound at Massachusetts Avenue. Newbury Street is known for its retail shops and restaurants.

== Description ==
East of Massachusetts Avenue, Newbury Street is a mile-long street lined with historic 19th-century brownstones that contain hundreds of shops and restaurants, making it a popular destination for tourists and locals. Most of the "high-end boutiques" are located near the Boston Public Garden end of Newbury Street. As the address numbers climb, the shops become slightly less expensive and more bohemian up to Massachusetts Avenue.

West of Massachusetts Avenue, the street borders the Massachusetts Turnpike on its unbuilt southern side, while the northern side is reserved mainly for parking and rear service entrances for buildings on Commonwealth Avenue. Newbury Street is interrupted by the Muddy River and Charlesgate Park. It then continues to border the Turnpike on its southern side until it meets Brookline Avenue. The shopping district might be able to expand as a result of a major project that is being considered for decking over the Turnpike to the west of Massachusetts Avenue.

Newbury Street has a mix of shops and eateries. Its renovated brownstone buildings feature coffee shops, cafes, and restaurants, with stores at all retail levels. However, due to the concentration of upscale luxury stores at its easternmost end, it is known as one of the most expensive streets in the world.

Donlyn Lyndon, the Eva Li Professor Emeritus of Architecture and Urban Design at the University of California, Berkeley, writes that west of Clarendon Street

Newbury Street develops its own very distinctive and appealing character and becomes one of the nicest shopping streets in Boston, or anywhere. Renovated town houses with large glass bays on the ground floor produce a delightful urban landscape.... Owners and tenants... have further animated the street by using the 25-foot (7.6 m) space between the building and the sidewalk for various purposes. Some areas are paved and used for displays or sidewalk sales. Others have thick planting... Some lots have stairs up and down to shops and galleries; others have show windows and display cases for flowers or fashions or other items for sale. But each contributes something extra, and together they make these blocks of Newbury Street genuinely attractive.

Since 2000, the City of Boston has experimented with closing Newbury Street between Berkeley Street and Massachusetts Avenue to vehicular traffic on Sundays during the summer. This "Open Newbury Street" program was extended by the addition of two December weekends as of 2024.

== History ==
=== Early history ===
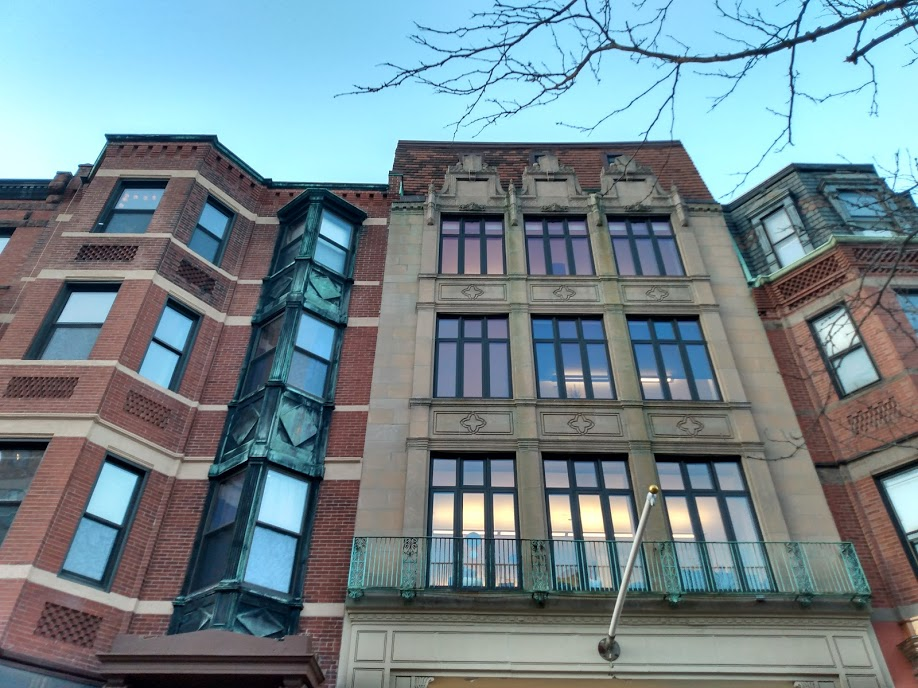
Newbury Street Back Bay

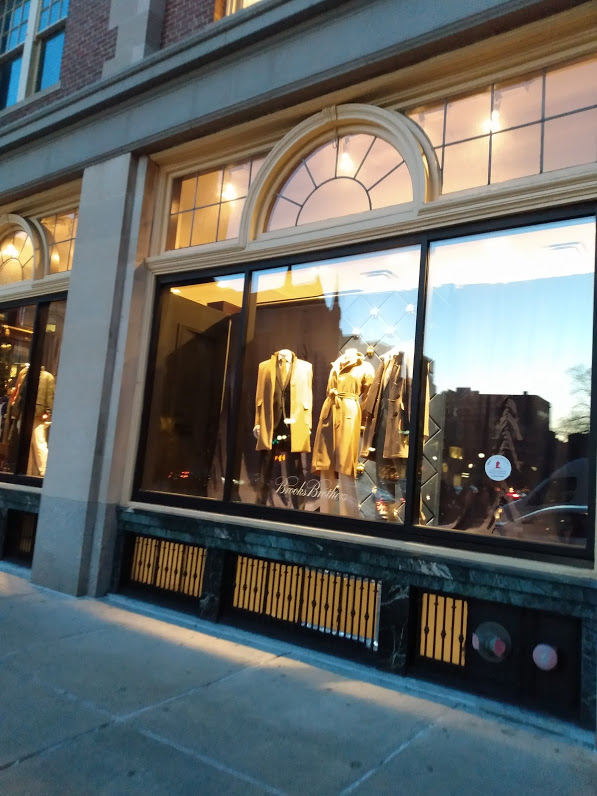
Back Bay 2019 Brooks Brothers on Newbury Street

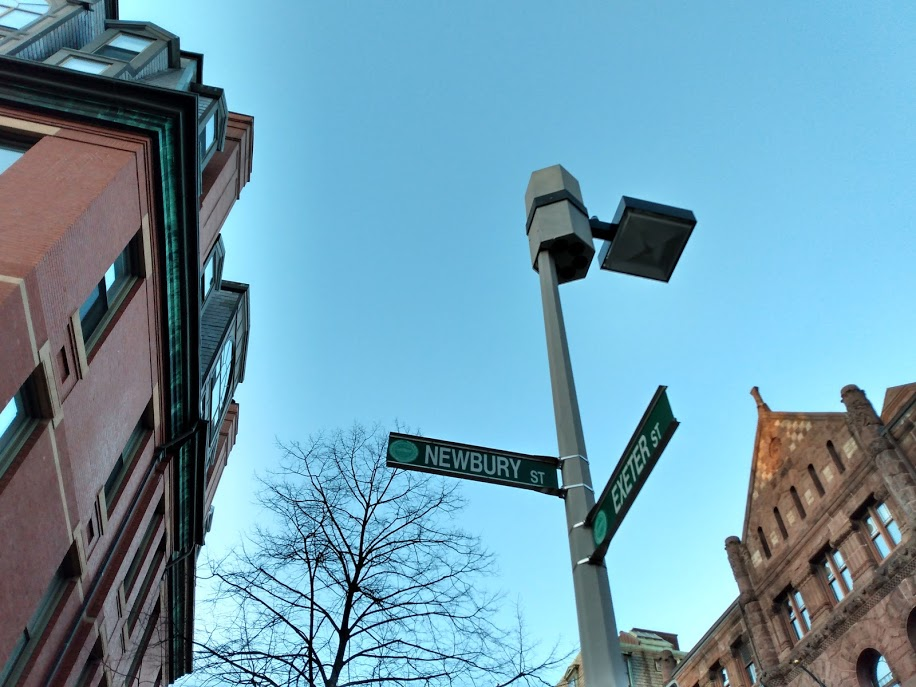
Newbury Street Street Sign at Exeter Street

Newbury Street's name celebrates the victory of the Puritans in the 1643 Battle of Newbury in the English Civil War. Newbury Street was one of the earliest roads in Boston, its portion was renamed Washington Street by the end of the 18th century. The current road was created during the filling in of Back Bay in the mid-19th century.

The 1893 edition of Baedeker's United States catalogs Boston's "finest residence streets" as Commonwealth Avenue, Beacon Street, Marlborough Street, Newbury Street, and Mt. Vernon Street. William J. Geddis, however, notes that it was "the least fashionable Street in Back Bay."

Owen Wister's novel, Philosophy 4, set in the 1870s, mentions Newbury Street:

When you saw [Harvard student Oscar Maironi] seated in a car bound for Park Square, you knew he was going into Boston, where he would read manuscript essays on Botticelli or Pico della Mirandola, or manuscript translations of Armenian folksongs; read these to ecstatic, dim-eyed ladies in Newbury Street, who would pour him cups of tea when it was over, and speak of his earnestness after he was gone. It did not do the ladies any harm; but I am not sure that it was the best thing for Oscar.

The first commercial establishments opened around 1905. By the late 1920s, lower Newbury Street had begun to establish itself as a destination for well-heeled society. With the establishment of Boston's Junior League in 1907, formal dances became very fashionable, and elegant apparel shops prospered. By 1911, 24 Newbury St. featured a salon for lessons in "social and aesthetic dance." As more retailers moved in, many lower floor shops began to feature wide glass windows to exhibit luxury goods. In the late 1950s, fashionable boutiques included Darée, Charles Sumner, Miss Harvey (at #32), furriers and Joseph Antell. One of Newbury's oldest and most established retailers is the Brooks Brothers department store which occupies its original quarters at the corner of Berkeley St.

=== Transformation into a shopping district ===
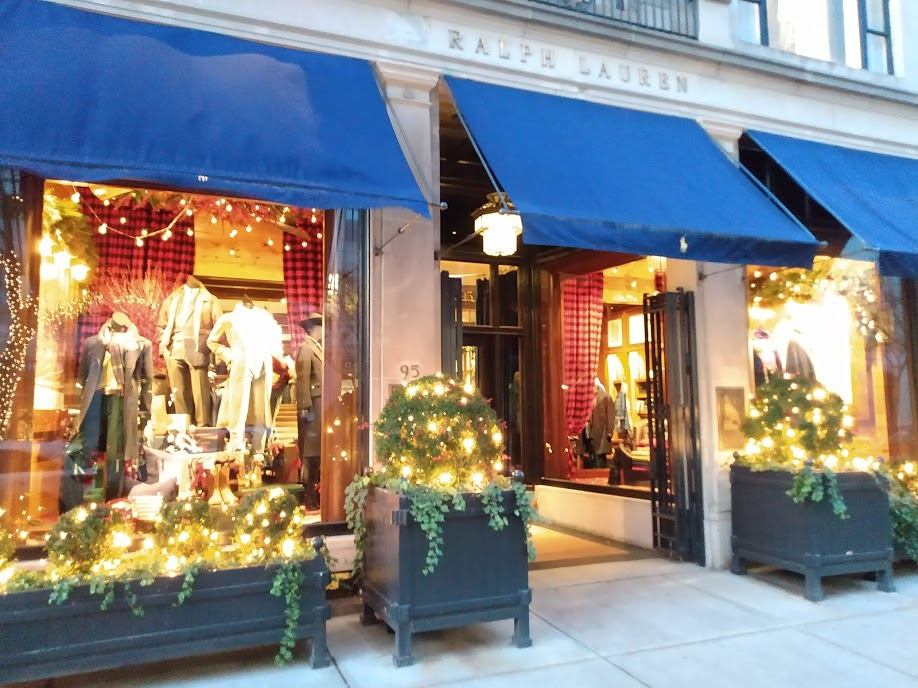
Ralph Lauren Store, 93–95 Newbury St, Boston

The transformation that turned Newbury Street into a trendy shopping district probably began in the 1970s with the opening of the original Newbury Comics.

From 1970 until the late 1990s, lower Newbury Street was lined with posh up-and-coming art galleries. Newbury Street mavens and hipsters spent Saturday afternoons gallery hopping and enjoying the ubiquitous "wine and cheese" art openings.

The renowned music instrument retailer E.U. Wurlitzer Music and Sound was a part of the greater Boston music scene since 1890, and the store had been located at 360 Newbury Street (on the corner of Massachusetts Avenue) after moving from its LaGrange Street address in the mid-1960s. The building was a plain yellow-brick building by the time the company went out of business in the mid-1980s. In 1989, it was renovated under the direction of architect Frank Gehry and won the Parker Award as the most beautiful new building in Boston. According to architecture columnist Robert Campbell, Gehry "took a blandly forgettable building and transformed it into a monument... It's the first significant example in Boston of a movement known as deconstruction. Deconstructionist buildings are designed to look as if their parts are either colliding or exploding, usually at crazy angles."

=== Recent history ===
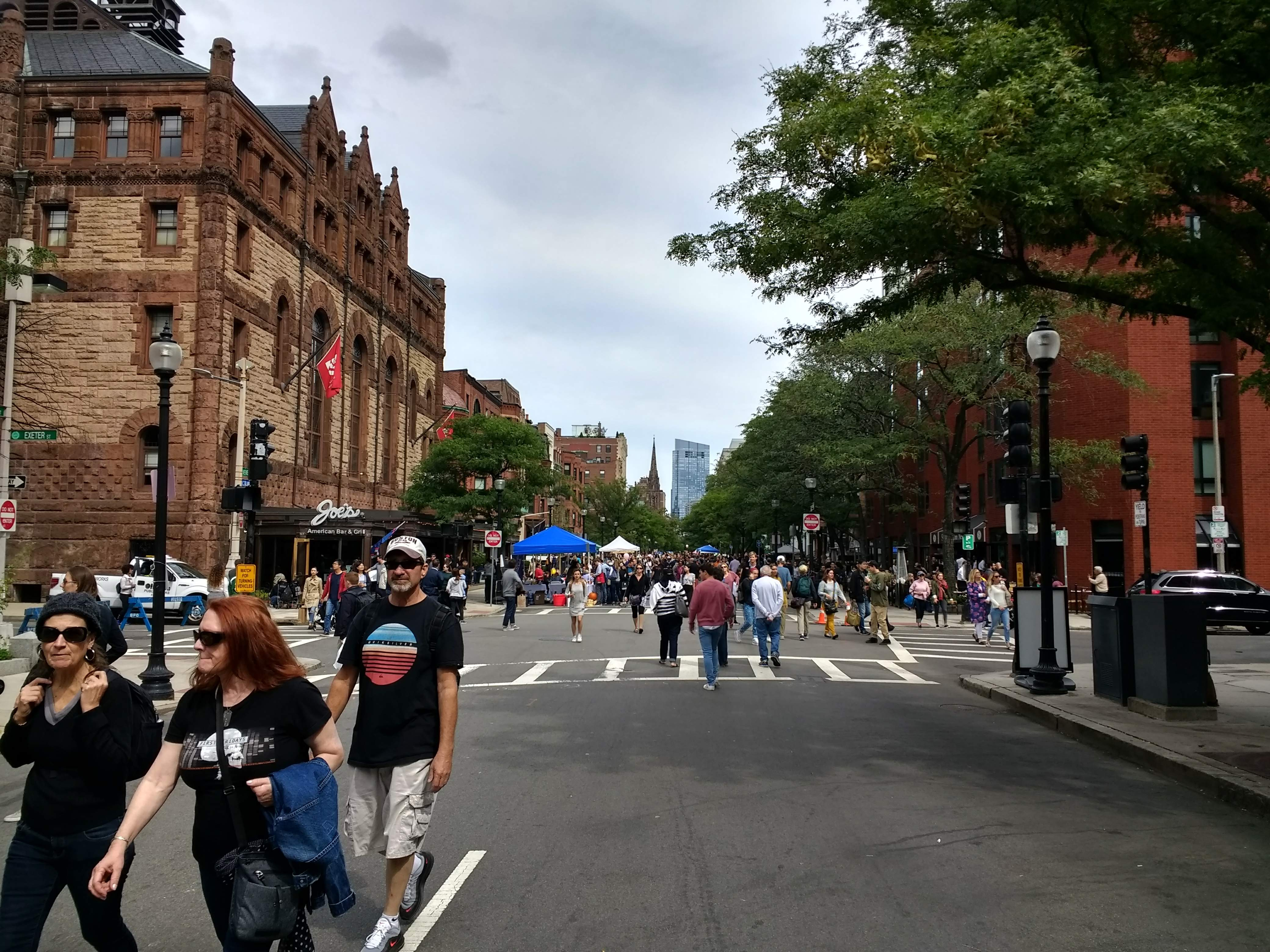
Newbury Street open to pedestrians only for "Open Newbury Street" in September 2018.

Made-to-measure suits, eco-friendly products, guide shops and concept stores are offerings now commonly found in the area. The street has retained both its architectural style and a mix of retailers, from luxury brands and high-end boutiques to newer companies, cafés and restaurants.

The district has become a popular destination for highly produced pop up shops. Many e-commerce brands use temporary storefronts on Newbury Street to test the Boston market for expansion, often landing as permanent fixtures on the street. Local and national celebrities such as Julian Edelman, Kanye West, Martellus Bennett, and Gretta Monahan have also created or contributed to pop up activations on Newbury Street.

== Notable places ==
- The first building completed in Back Bay after it was filled in 1860 was Emmanuel Church at 15 Newbury Street.
- At 234 Berkeley Street, between Newbury and Boylston Streets, is a notable building designed by William G. Preston in the classical French Beaux-Arts architecture style for the Boston Society of Natural History in 1864. Lyndon describes it as "a remarkably serene Classical building with none of the latent boosterism of its near contemporary, Old City Hall." The museum was renamed the Museum of Science in 1945 and moved to Science Park. It was the site of a Bonwit Teller store from 1947 to 1989 and the men's retailer Louis, Boston from 1990 to 2010. In March 2013, the extensively renovated building re-opened as a Restoration Hardware flagship store.
- Between 1865 and 1916, Newbury Street was the location of the Massachusetts Institute of Technology. Its Boston campus grew to include two large academic buildings adjacent to the Natural History Museum, one of which was also designed by Preston. By the beginning of the 20th century, smaller scaled townhouses and social establishments filled in much of the length of street frontage. By 1939, MIT's grand structures were demolished and replaced by an insurance building. Gentleman's Clubs on Newbury Street included MIT's Technology Club at #83 across from the original main campus.
- Boston Architectural College at 320 Newbury Street and 322 Newbury Street, the United States' oldest and largest private college of spatial design, made its home on Newbury Street in the early 1960s. A national design competition was held in 1964, and the winning entry (by Ashley, Myer & Associates) houses the BAC to this day. The main campus building located at 320 Newbury Street is a large Brutalist building, a major example of this style in Back Bay. The college also owns 951/955 Boylston, which is connected to the fire station at 941 Boylston. The fire station is still active, housing Boston Fire Department Engine Company 33, and Ladder Company 15. The west elevation of the 320 Newbury building is articulated with a mural by the artist Richard Haas, which was completed in 1975. The trompe l'oeil full-scale cross-section of a Classical-style building and dome provides a contrast to the Brutalist style of the building.
- On the corner of Exeter and Newbury Street—the address is given both as 181 Newbury Street and as 26 Exeter Street—is a striking building designed by Boston architects Hartwell and Richardson in the Romanesque Revival style. It was originally built in 1885 as the First Spiritual Temple, a Spiritualist church. In 1914 it became a movie theater, the Exeter Street Theatre. The movie theater was notable both for its ambiance ("You felt like you were in some kind of Tudor manor or English country church") and programming ("It was a theater where people did not call to see what movie was playing, but called only to determine if the movie had changed"). Beginning in the mid-1970s, the theater's midnight screenings of The Rocky Horror Picture Show gave the movie a popular cult following, often attracting patrons dressed up in costumes based on characters in the film.
- After 70 years the Exeter Street Theatre closed in 1984, due to declining box-office revenues. Its illustrious interior was dismantled and transformed into a Conran's furniture store. After the failure of Conran's, it became a Waterstone's bookstore, whose extensive inventory was ruined by massive flooding caused by sprinklers set off by a fire in the T.G.I. Friday's restaurant downstairs. Since 2005 the Kingsley Montessori School has occupied the building, with offices on the upper floors and a restaurant at street level.
- In 2012, the chocolatier L.A. Burdick opened its fourth location on Newbury Street.
- In 2023, Newbury Street has witnessed the emergence of several noteworthy establishments, contributing to the street's reputation as a hub of luxury and style. Notable among these recent additions are renowned stores including New Balance, Moscot, and Byredo.
- Trident Booksellers and Cafe, 338 Newbury Street, established in 1984.
