= D. C. Heath and Company =

- Ginn and Heath, Maine, circa 1875, the predecessor to Ginn and Heath Publishing. D.C. Heath and Co., founded by Edwin Ginn Daniel Collamore Heath
- Status: Defunct
- Founded: 1885
- Founder: Daniel Collamore Heath
- Successor: Houghton Mifflin
- Country of origin: United States
- Headquarters location: Lexington, Massachusetts
- Publication types: Textbooks

D. C. Heath and Company was an American publishing company specializing in textbooks. It was founded in 1885 in Boston by Edwin Ginn and Daniel Collamore Heath and was later located at 125 Spring Street in Lexington, Massachusetts. From 1966 to 1995 the firm was owned by Raytheon. When Raytheon exited the textbook market, it sold the company to Houghton Mifflin.

== History ==
=== 19th century ===
One of the firm's founders, Daniel Collamore Heath, stated that he had founded the company "for the purpose of providing tools for the new education".

=== 1980s ===
D.C. Heath started a small division of software editors to supplement the textbooks in the early 1980s. The editors strove to make the software packages independent of the books. (Note-these editors were former teachers) There were test banks that allowed teachers to pick and choose questions for their quizzes and tests. Development was further supported to enable teachers to create their own questions including a formula editor, tagging items by objectives, and including custom graphics in the question as well as in the answer key. This was for the Apple 2 then later Windows and Macintoshes. Many titles were commissioned for the areas of science, math, reading, social studies, and modern languages. These were interactive original programs. D.C. Heath gave this group their own identity, Collamore Educational Publishing. The editors were involved in all facets of the publishing process including contracts, development, design, publishing, marketing, and sales. Schools were just transitioning from the one computer classroom to the computer lab. In 1988 most of the software was being supported by William K. Bradford Publishing Company composed initially by D. C. Heath / Collamore personnel.

== Publications ==
Listed below are a number of the books published by D. C. Heath.

- Heath Elementary Science, by Herman and Nina Schneider, 6 volumes (1955)
- Heath middle level literature (1996?) ISBN 0-669-42948-1
- Heath Physics (1992) ISBN 0-669-25793-1
- Fundamentals of Personal Rapid Transit (1978)
- Discovering French Bleu: Complete Lesson Plans
- The Enduring Vision: A History of the American People Third Edition (1996)
- Ruy Blas by Victor Hugo (1933)
- The Renaissance Medieval or Modern?
- The Enduring South: Subcultural Persistence in Mass Society (1972), by John Shelton Reed.
- The Story of Georgia, Massey and Wood, 1904
- MC68000: Assembly Language and Systems Programming (1988) ISBN 0-669-16085-7
- Victor Hugo's Les Misérables: French Edition
- Elizabeth Rice Allgeier, Albert Richard Allgeier, Sexual Interactions, 1991
- A Short German Grammar for High Schools and Colleges. (The book cover just says "German Grammar" for the title) by E. S.Sheldon, tutor in German in Harvard University (1903), copyright 1879
- The Causes of the American Revolution (1950, 1962, 1973)
- Introductory Old English Grammar and Reader – G. T. Flom, ed. (1930)
- Builders of the Old World, Written by Gertrude Hartman and Illustrated by Marjorie Quennell (1951)
- Composition and Rhetoric by William Williams copyright 1890 published 1893
- The Nazi Revolution: Germany's Guilt or Germany's Fate?
- Children and Their Helpers New American Readers For Catholic Schools by School Sisters of Notre Dame. (1938)
- Donald Duck Sees South America (1945) H. Marion Palmer, Walt Disney
- Old Time Stories of the Old North State by L. A. McCorkle (1903)
- Old Testament Narratives selected and edited by Roy L. French and Mary Dawson (1931)
- Hamlet The Arden Shakespeare, edited by E. K. Chambers, B.A. (1908)
- Eugenie Grandet French Edition, by Honoré de Balzac, Abridged and Edited with Introduction Notes and Vocabulary by A. G. H. Spiers, Ph.D., (copyright 1914)
- "The Bug In The Hut" and "Nat The Rat", unknown authors, (1968–1970)
- Modern European History – Revised Edition – by Hutton Webster Ph.D. (copyright 1920 and 1925)
- World Civilization (1940, 1944, 1949) by Hutton Webster and Edgar Bruce Wesley
- Hints Toward A Select and Descriptive Bibliography of Education – by G Stanley Hall and John M Mansfield (copyright 13 August 1886)
- Klaeber, Friedrich (1922). Beowulf and The Fight at Finnsburg. Boston: D.C. Heath & Company.
- Elementary Linear Algebra: Second Edition by Roland E. Larson and Bruce H. Edwards (1991) ISBN 0-669-24592-5
- Software initial addition by Hal Wexler, software editor, 1984–1988 then transitioned to William K. Bradford Publishing Company.
- Campaign Organization by Xandra Kayden (1978)

== Book series ==
- The Belles-Lettres Series
- Discussions of Literature (general editor: Joseph H. Summers)
- English in Action (J. C. Tressler et al.)
- Heath's English Classics
- Heath's Golden Key Series
- Heath's Modern Language Series
- History on the March
- New World Neighbors
- Problems in European Civilization
- Walt Disney Story Books
