= Adio diBiccari =

American sculptor (1914–2009)

- Born: 1914; Revere, Massachusetts, United States
- Died: January 1, 2009 (aged 94–95); Arlington, Massachusetts, United States
- Education: School of the Museum of Fine Arts
- Known for: Sculpture
- Spouse: Evelyn Wilson
- Children: 4

Adio diBiccari (1914 – January 1, 2009) was an American sculptor.

== Career ==
DiBiccari was born in Revere to Italian immigrants, but grew up in East Boston and graduated from East Boston High School in 1932. He received a full scholarship to the School of the Museum of Fine Arts, and studied abroad in France, Germany, and Italy while there. After returning to the United States, he married Evelyn Wilson in 1937. They lived in New Hampshire, but after World War II, settled in Arlington, Massachusetts. The couple had four children: Ruth, Lynda, Eda, and Albert. Jointly with fellow East Bostonian sculptor Arcangelo Cascieri, diBiccari opened a studio on Tavern Road in the Fenway neighborhood of Boston.

Among diBiccari's best-known works are the 18-foot-tall (5.5 m) statue of the goddess Athena atop the Athenaeum Press in East Cambridge and the Northeastern University husky mascot (1962), as well as the three bronze figures of Industry, Learning, and Religion in Parkman Plaza (1958), which he produced alongside Cascieri. He also produced sculptures for churches, including the Basilica of the National Shrine of the Immaculate Conception in Washington, D.C., the Cathedral of St. John the Divine in New York City, the Cathedral of Mary Our Queen in Baltimore, as well as many churches in Massachusetts, including St. Brigid's in Lexington, the Immaculate Conception Convent in Revere, and St. Ignatius Church at Boston College.

== Gallery ==
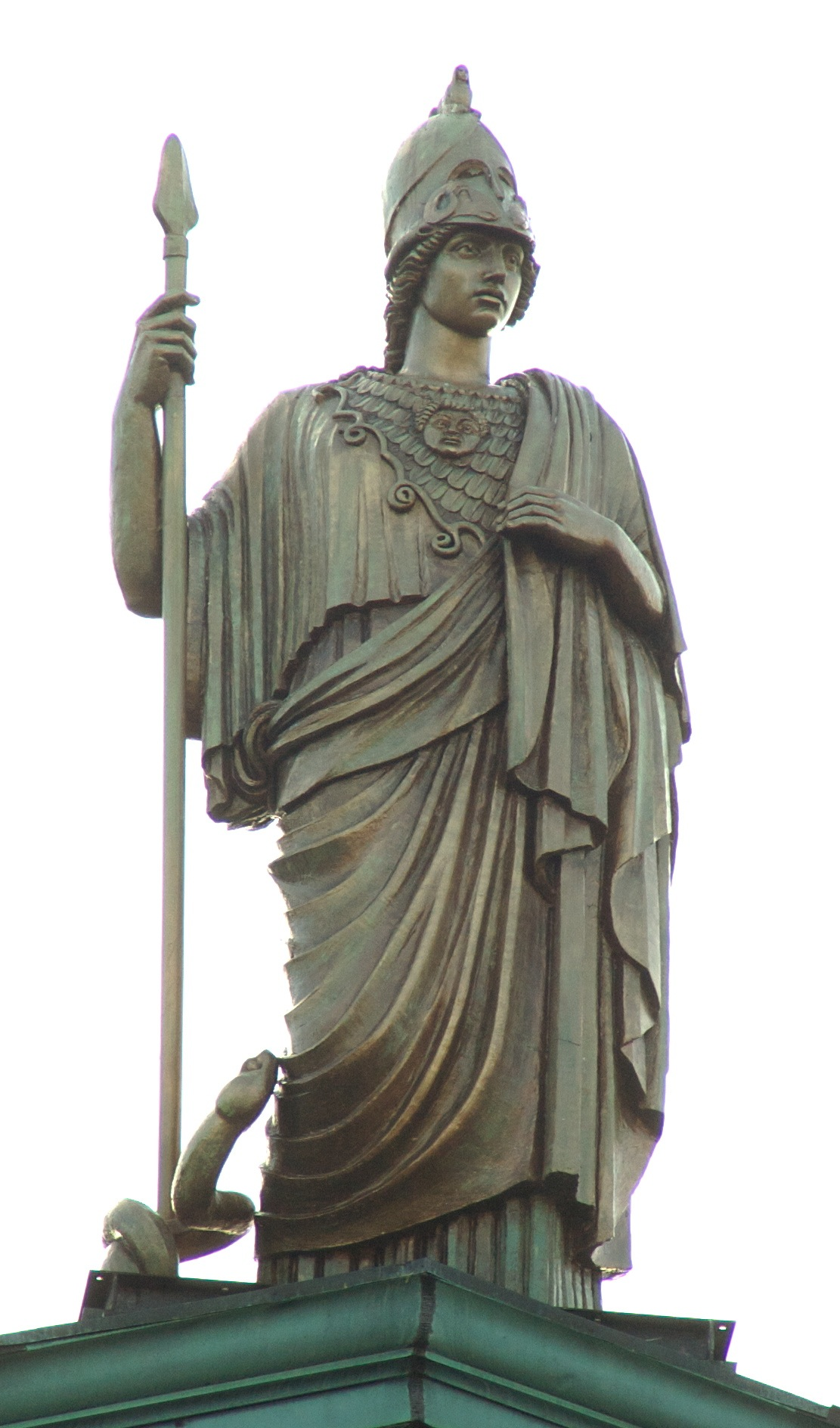
Athena at the Athenaeum Press.

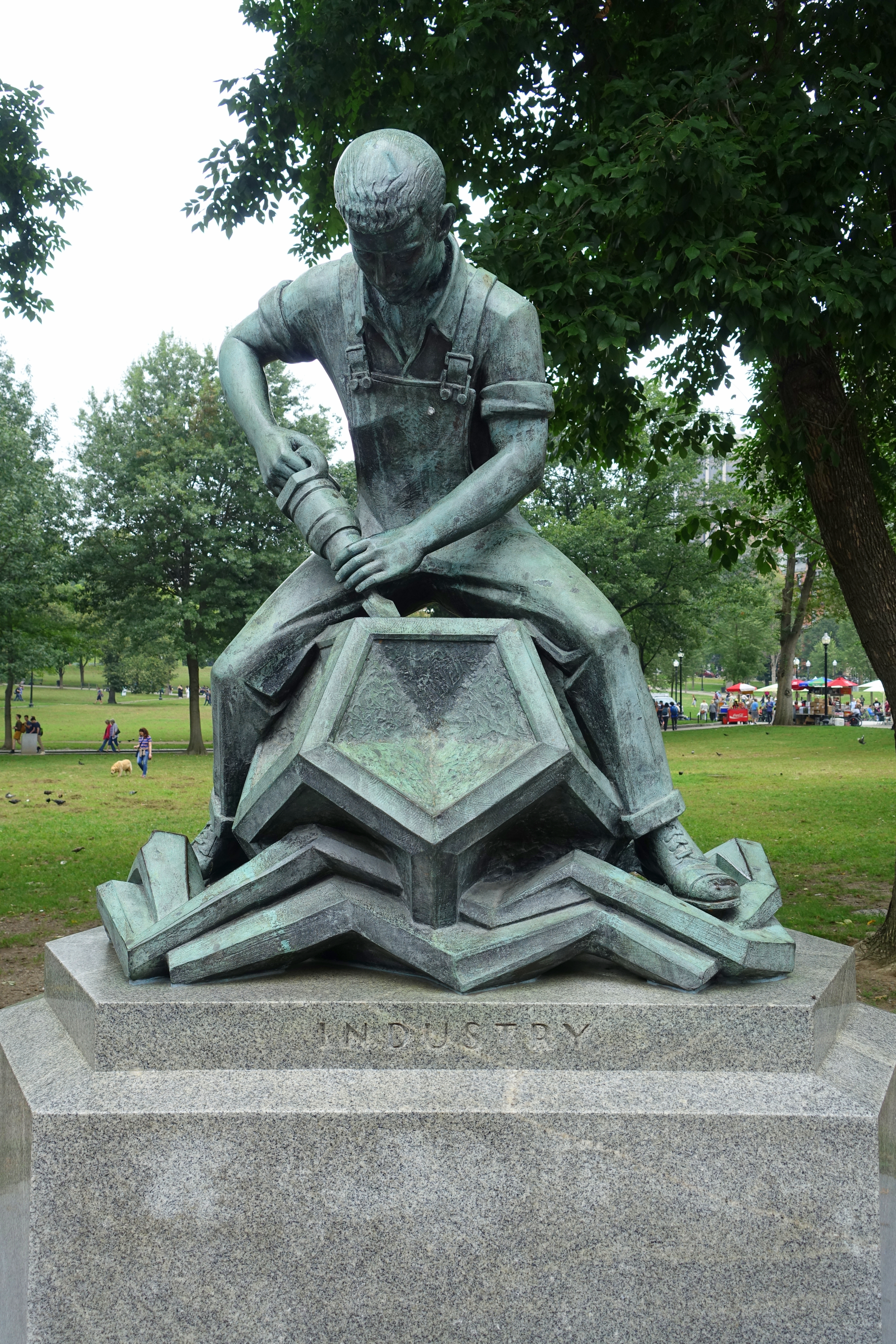
Industry in Parkman Plaza.

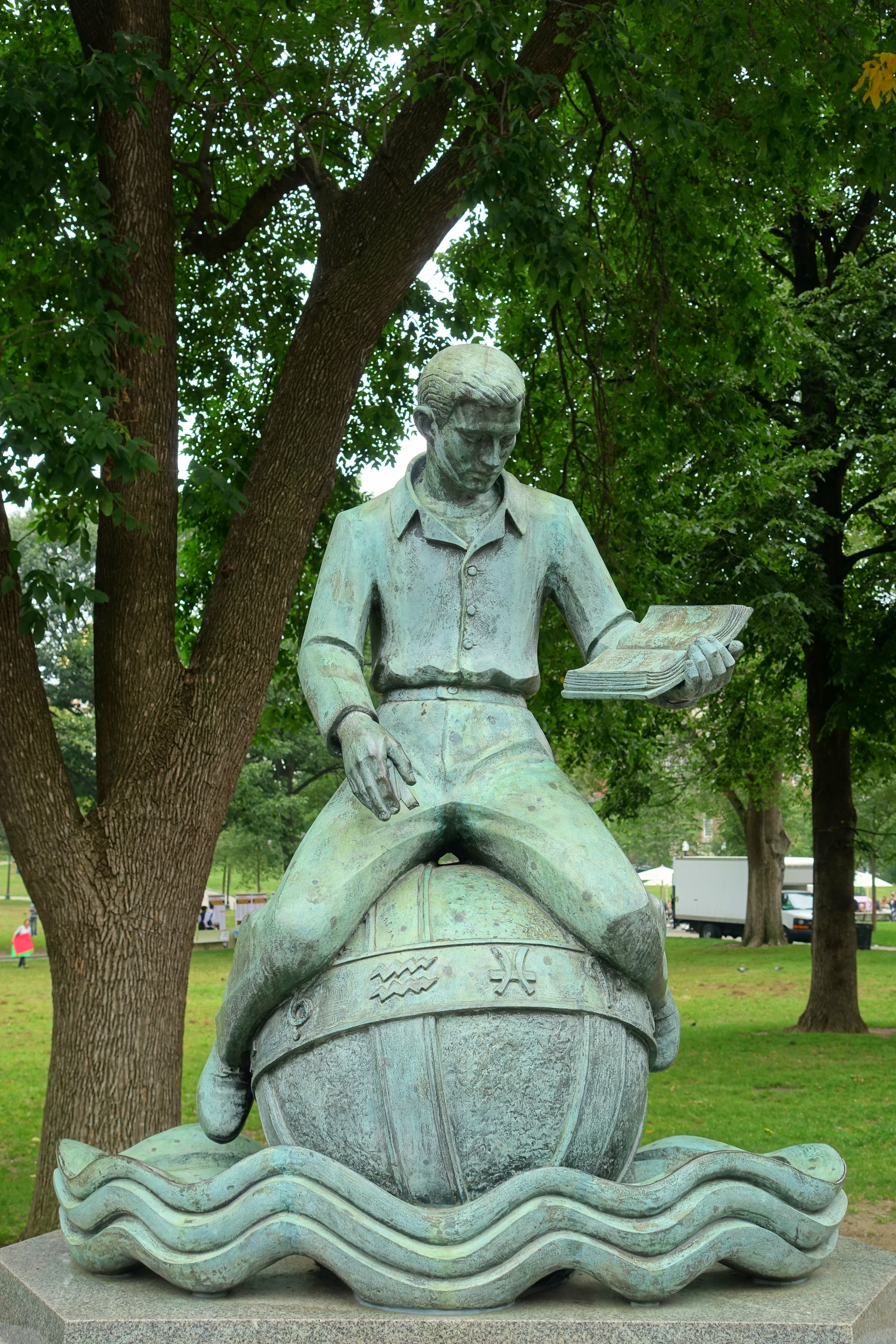
Learning in Parkman Plaza.

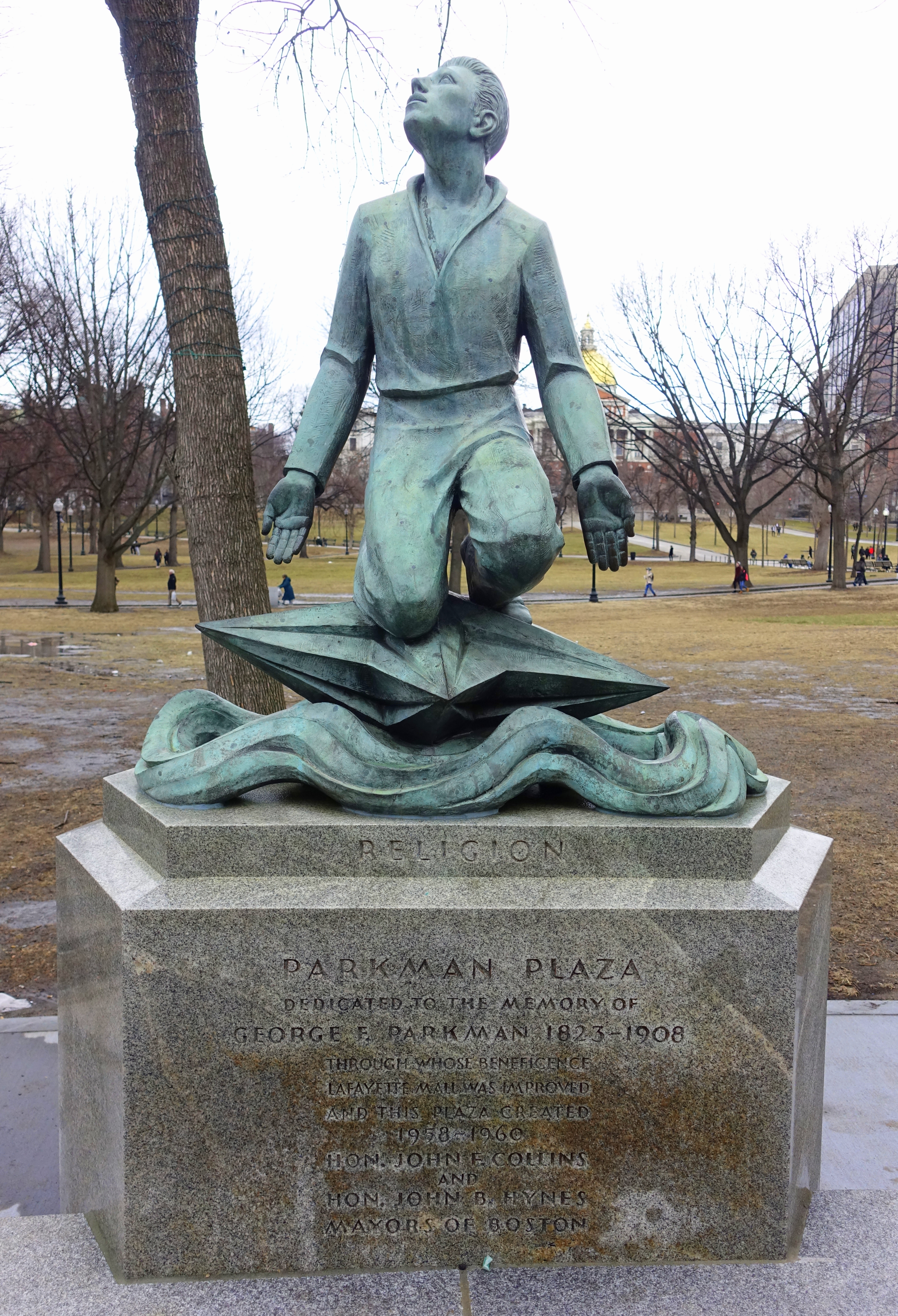
Religion in Parkman Plaza.
