= Ginn Carriage House =

- U.S. National Register of Historic Places
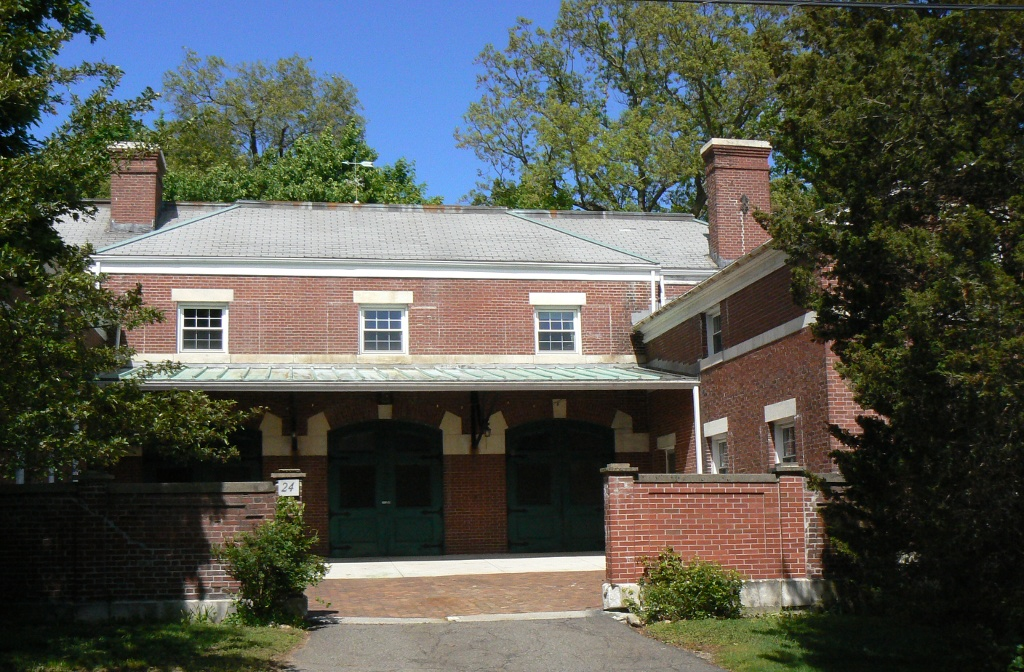

- Location within Massachusetts Location within the United States
- Location: 24 Ginn Road, Winchester, Massachusetts
- Coordinates: 42°26′48″N 71°8′28″W
- Built: 1900
- Architect: Ernest Flagg
- Architectural style: Colonial Revival
- MPS: Winchester MRA
- NRHP reference No.: 89000655
- Added to NRHP: July 5, 1989

The Ginn Carriage House is a historic carriage house in Winchester, Massachusetts. The building, which has been converted to a residence, is one of two surviving outbuildings (the other is the gardener's house) of the extensive "Terrace of Oaks" estate of publisher Edwin Ginn, whose main house was demolished in 1946. The U-shaped brick carriage house, built in 1900, exhibits high quality construction details, and has touches of Georgian Revival styling. The original doors to the carriage area are still attached to the building, sheltered by a copper shed roof.

The building was listed on the National Register of Historic Places in 1989.

== See also ==
- National Register of Historic Places listings in Winchester, Massachusetts
