= 320 Newbury Street =

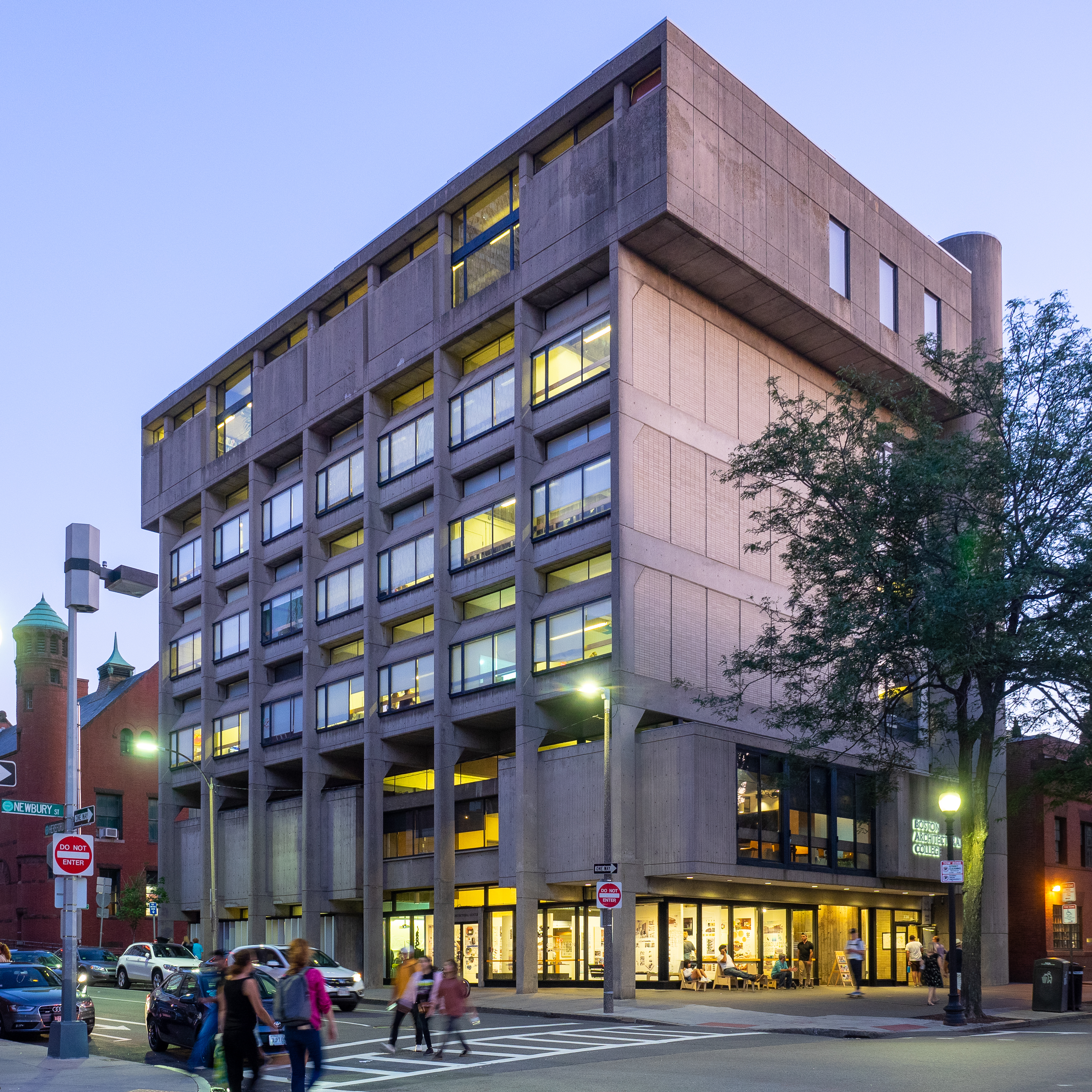
- Interactive map of the 320 Newbury Street area

General information
- Architectural style: Brutalist
- Location: 320 Newbury Street, Boston, Massachusetts
- Coordinates: 42.348451°N 71.085958°W
- Construction started: 1964
- Opened: May 8, 1966
- Cost: ~$1 million
- Owner: Boston Architectural College

Technical details
- Floor count: 6
- Floor area: 42,500 sq ft (3,950 m^{2})

Design and construction
- Architecture firm: Ashley, Myer & Associates

Other information
- Public transit: Green Line Hynes Convention Center station

320 Newbury Street is a six-story academic building on Newbury Street in the Back Bay neighborhood of Boston, Massachusetts. Since its opening in 1966, it has been the main facility for the Boston Architectural College. It was designed in the Brutalist style by Ashley, Myer & Associates.

== Location and design ==
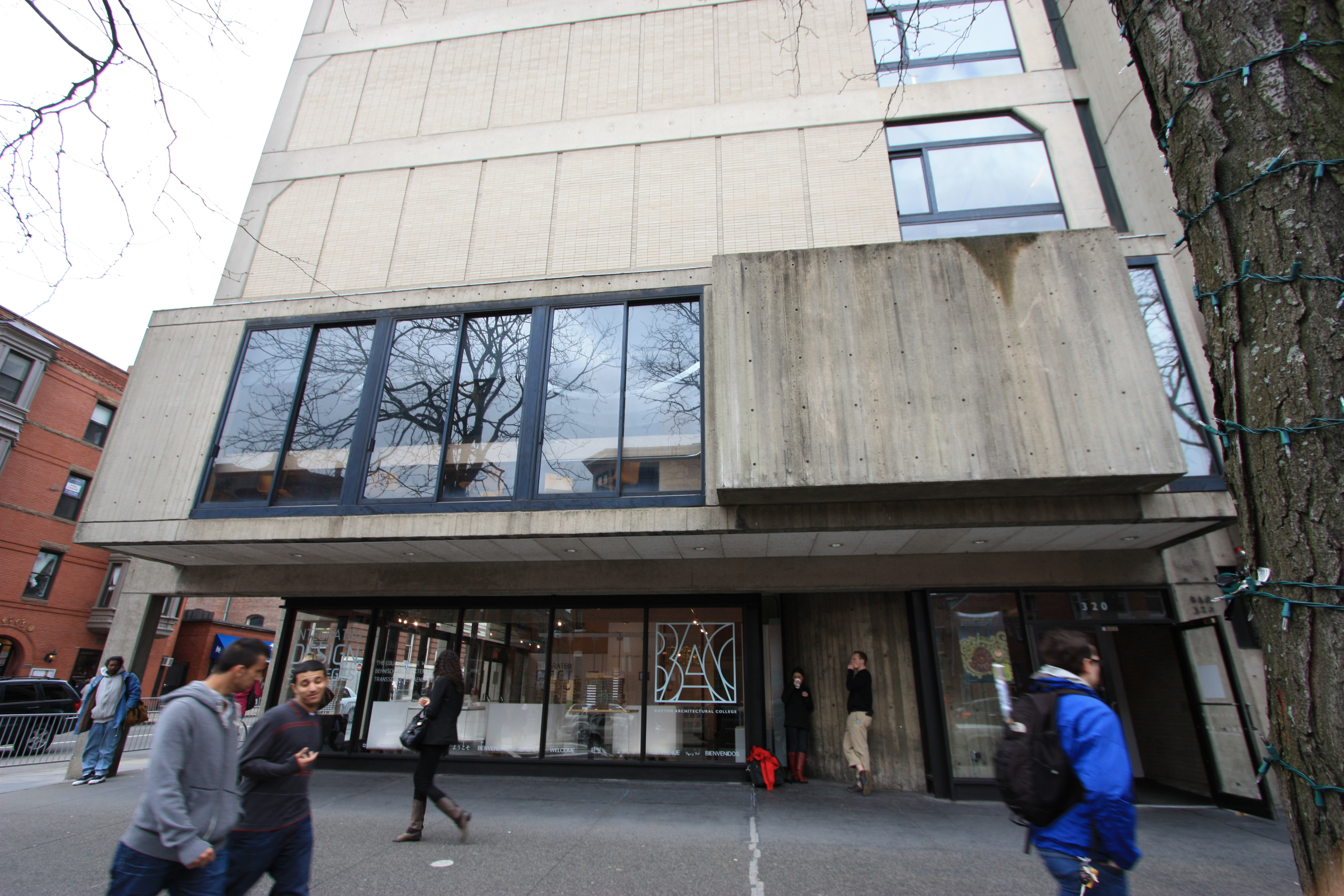
Newbury Street entrance in 2011

The school building is on the west end of Newbury Street, a row of galleries and boutique stores since before the building's construction. It was situated close to the elegant homes on Commonwealth Avenue and one block from the rising commercial district led by the construction of the Prudential Center in the 1960s. Other advantages of the site include its short distance from the Hynes Convention Center station and to the city's art museums, galleries, architectural firm offices, and universities. The brick building proved to be less structurally sound than expected, raising remodeling costs to $350,000. A new, larger building was estimated at $500,000, a small enough difference to convince the college to build the new structure on the site.

The building was designed by Ashley, Myer & Associates, with structural engineering by LeMessurier Consultants, engineering by Greenleaf Associates, and concrete consulting by Herman G. Protze. The general contractor was the John A. Volpe Construction Co. It has 42,500 sq ft (3,950 m^{2}), including its basement. The construction cost approximately $1 million.

The design intended for the building "... not to depend on a sense of weight to achieve importance but rather, through the energy of form, to evoke a sense of aliveness and contending." The design uses cantilevered, suspended masonry masses and accentuated vertical "slits" in the exterior by which some of the building's core functions can be seen from the outside. Open studio floors allow students to look in on one another's classes and studios, and the ground floor, open to Newbury Street, invites the general public into the McCormick Gallery.

The program for the new building originally had specified capacity for 200 students with 30 to 50 square feet (4.6 m^{2}) of space allocated to each student. Several floors were designed to be rented until the school required them. Growth of the student body, however, proceeded more rapidly than anticipated, and the number of students gradually increased to as many as 650 in 1974. The "extra floors" were never rented, and the expanding student body and staff needed to support them quickly placed demands on all existing space.

The building was featured on the cover of Architectural Forum in December 1966.

The building's cylindrical stair towers were inspired by the neighboring building's corner turrets. The building, 941–955 Boylston Street, has been partially owned by the college since 2007.

=== Mural ===
The west elevation of the building has a relatively featureless party wall with a concrete frame and brick infilling. A 1966 article suggested the wall could remain exposed forever under a new zoning law.

Since 1975, the wall has been decorated with a mural by the artist Richard Haas. The trompe-l'œil mural of a Classical-style building and dome provides a contrast to the Brutalist style of the building. It was described in the February 1978 AIA Journal as a "a kind of madman's fantasy of an 1800-vintage French neocolonial palace" and it was featured on the cover of that month's issue.

=== Interior ===
The first floor of the building, at street level, has offices for the college as well as an exhibition gallery. The McCormick Gallery features student work as well as themed spatial design exhibits. The gallery is free and open to the public.

As originally built, the second floor held social spaces for the Boston Society of Architects, the local chapter of the American Institute of Architects. Service spaces in the building were arranged at the west side of the building, along the party wall. This left the remaining portion of each floor free for the building's primary uses. One piece of the BAC's prior space was transferred to the Brutalist building: an oak-paneled library with rare books and a plaster ceiling. The sixth floor contains this library as well as a modern reference library space and a central courtyard.

Gallery

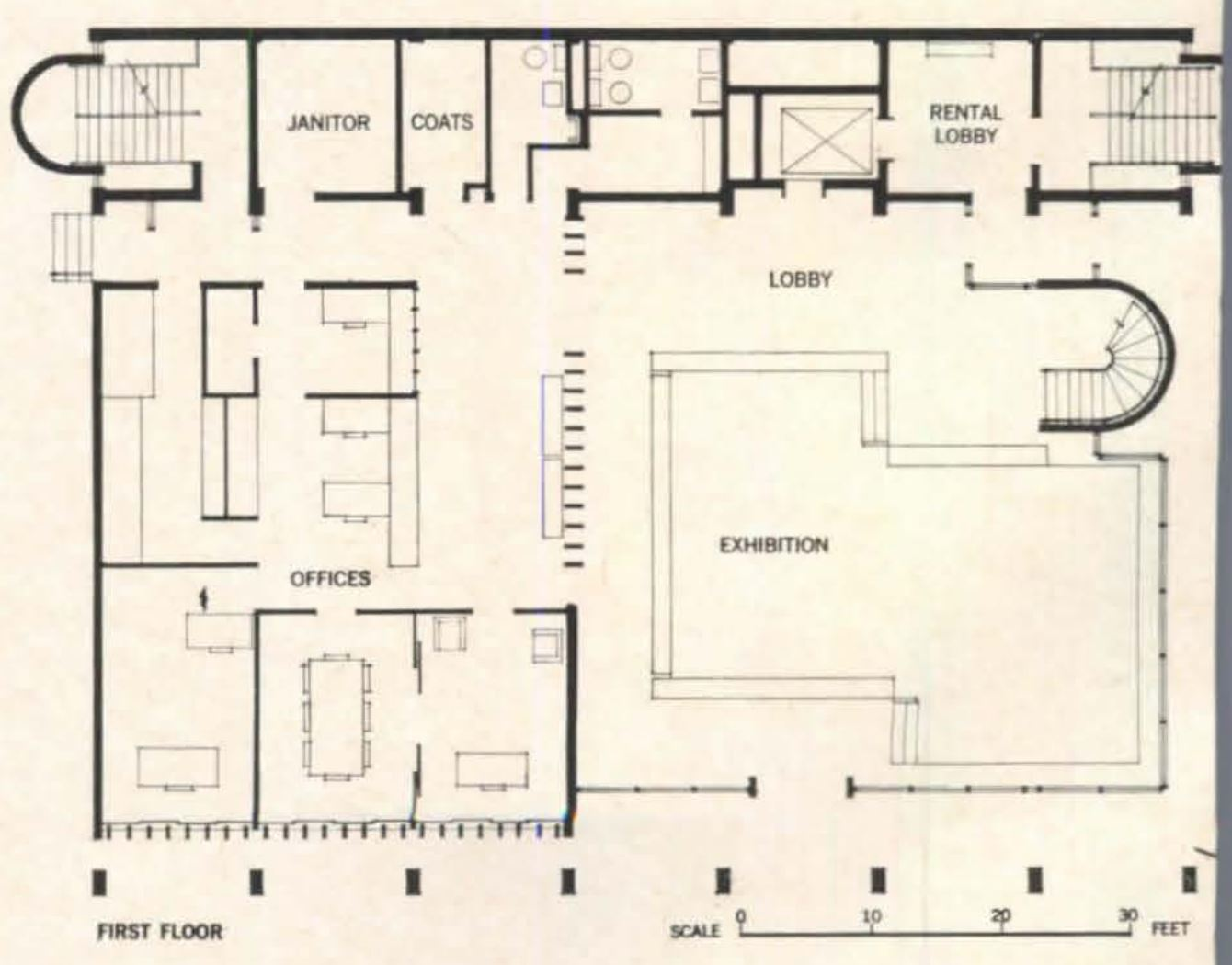
Floorplan, 1st floor

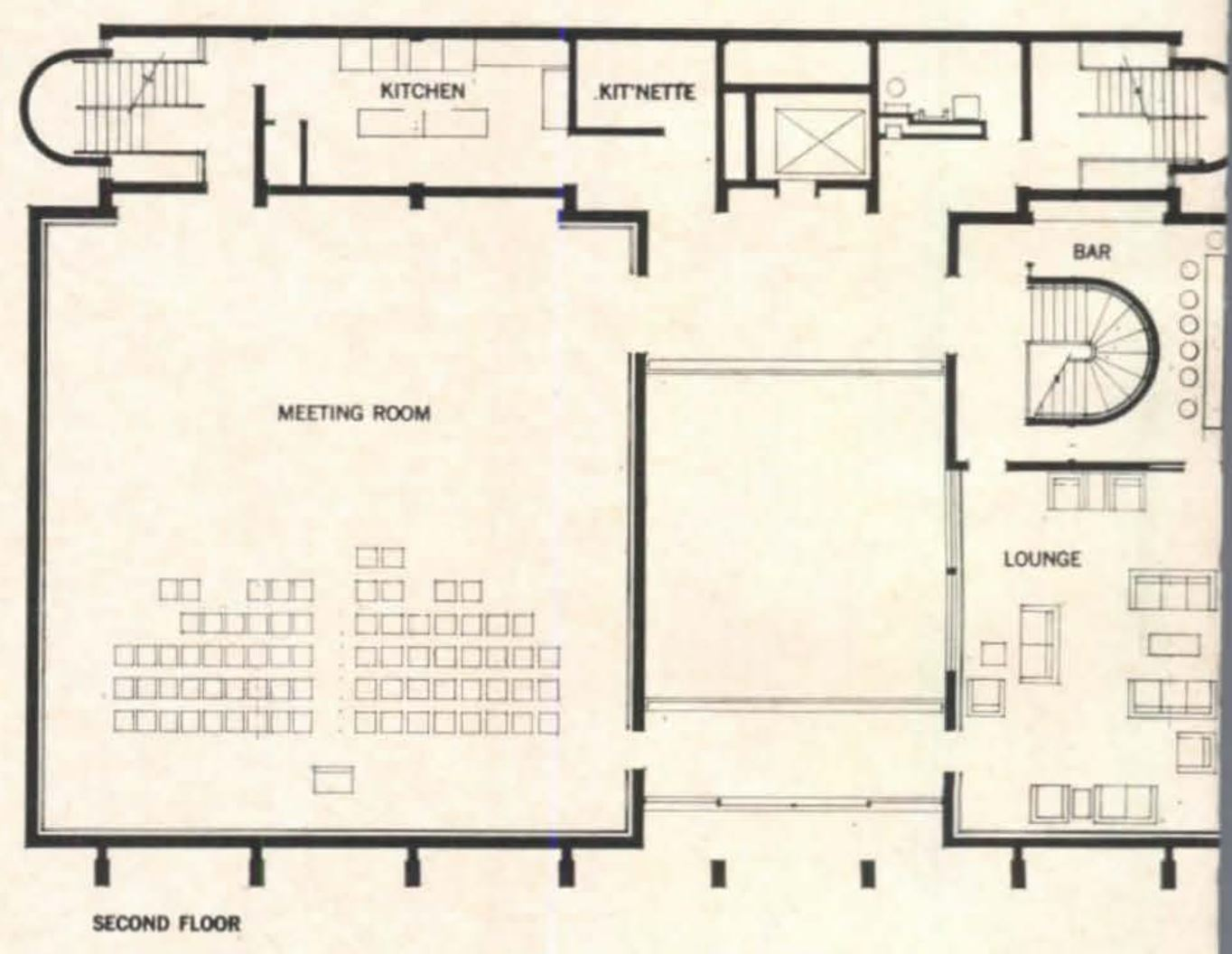
Floorplan, 2nd floor

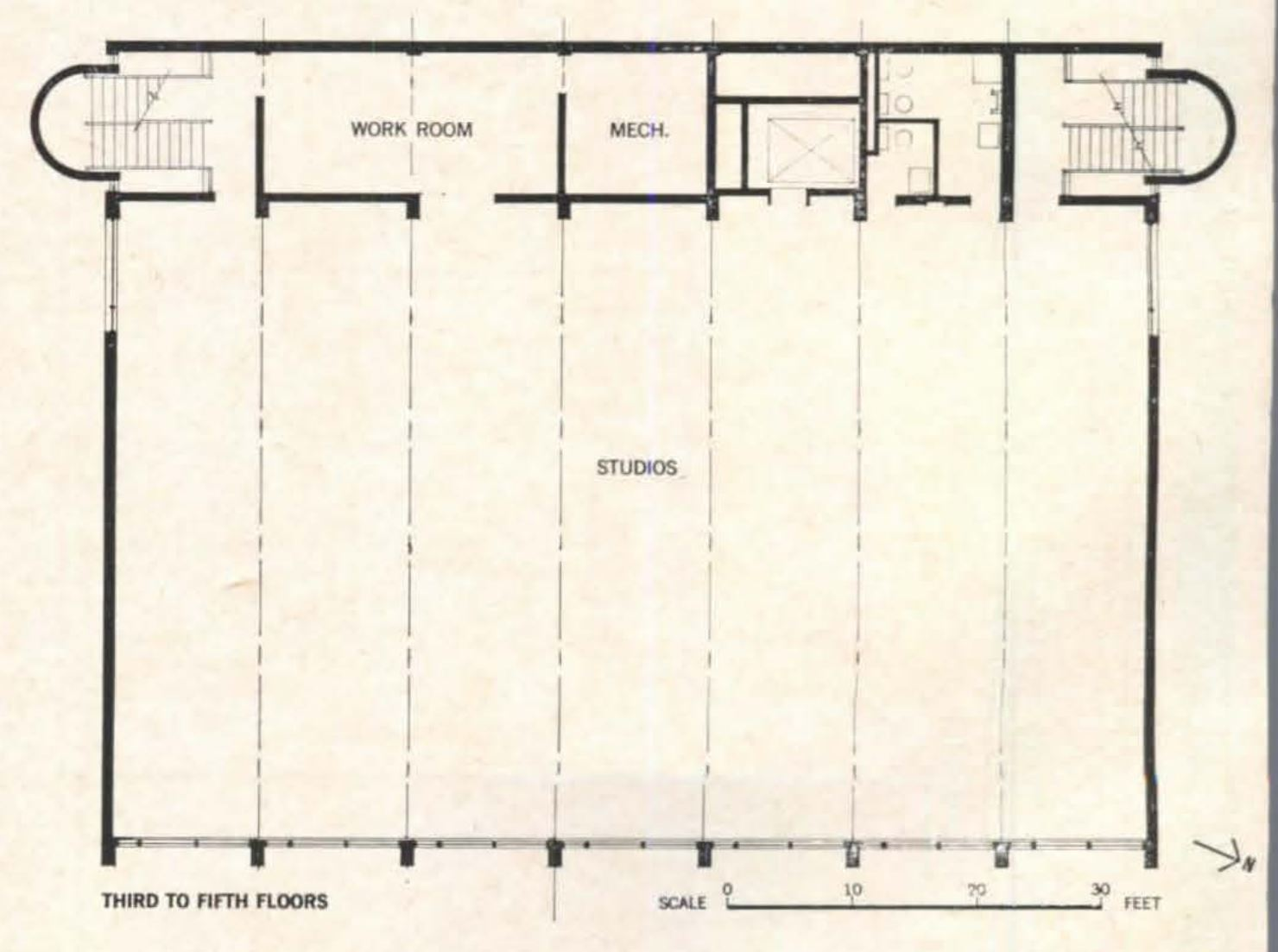
Floorplan, 3rd to 5th floors

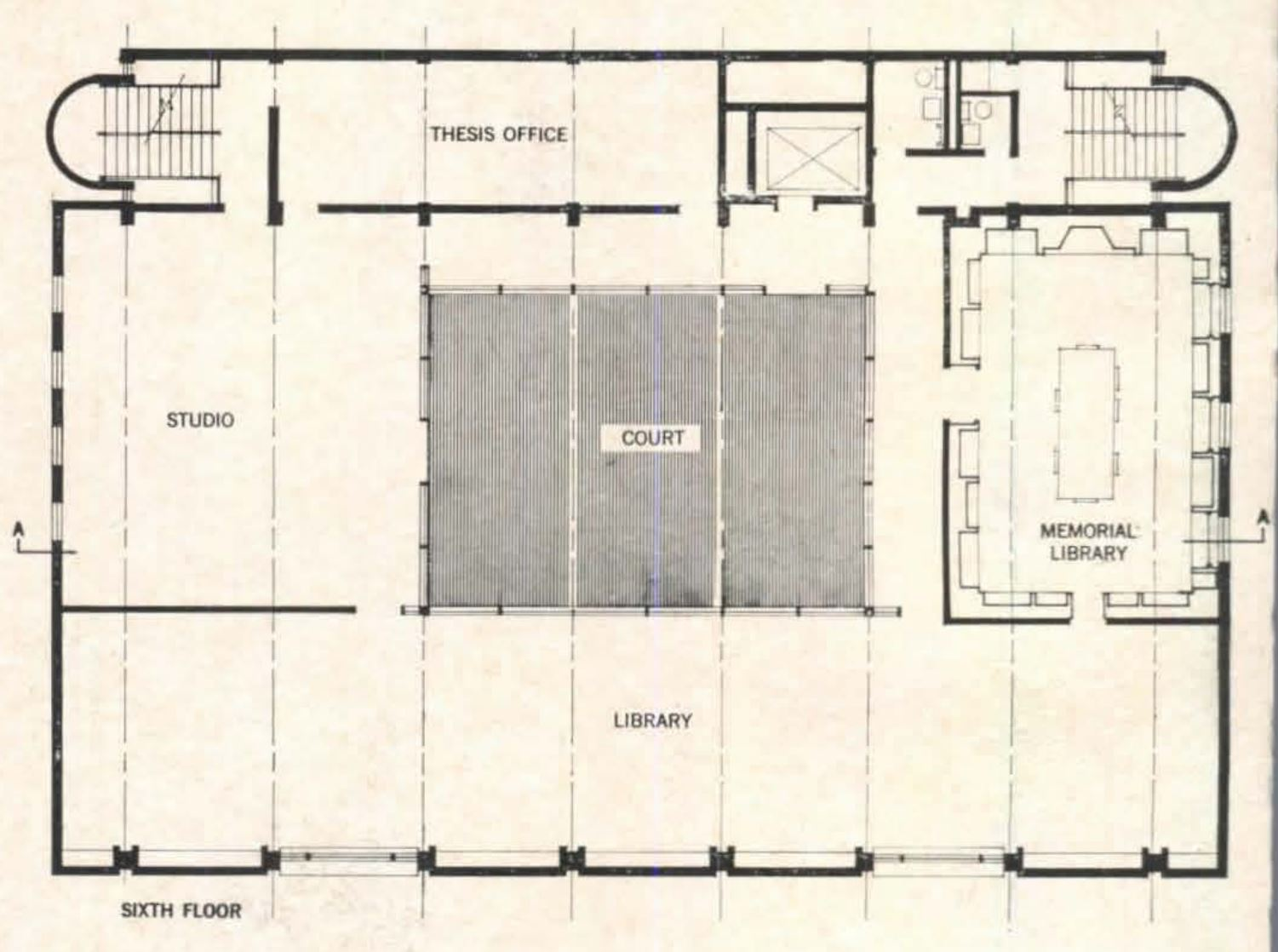
Floorplan, 6th floor

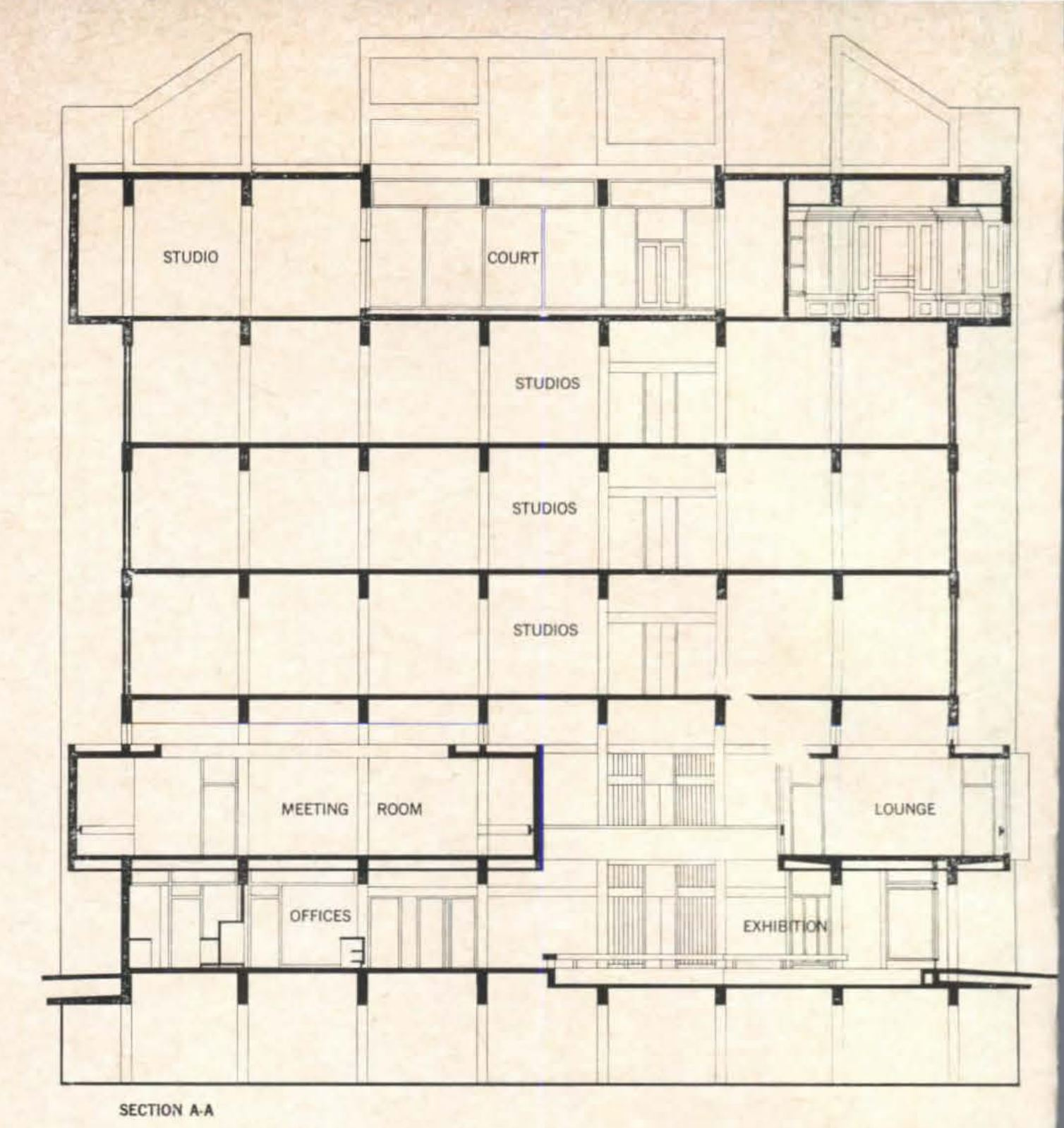
Cross-section view

== History ==
The college was previously known as the Boston Architectural Center. By 1965, the BAC had developed a continuing education program to serve the broader community. In the mid-1960s, it was forced out of its Somerset Street building and purchased a three-story brick building at 320 Newbury Street. The structure was a former stable and was solid, to be remodeled to fit the center's needs.

A national design competition was held in 1963, similar to one held for the design of Boston City Hall a year and a half prior, though it restricted who could enter. The competition required entries to reflect a widespread attention to and respect for the institute. Another prominent requirement was for evidence the construction would not exceed $500,000, not including a 10 percent limit for cost overruns. The winning entry, chosen in January 1964, was a Brutalist structure designed by the recently established firm of Ashley, Myer & Associates. The work earned the top vote of six of seven jurors, who praised its organized interior, cost efficiency of its prefabricated elements, and appropriate overall scale. In contrast, most of the entries, including the two runners-up, were criticized as striving to be too exciting for the small site. After the competition, few changes were made. Some elements were removed and later restored, and additional elements were added through gifts, government grants, and educational loans. The prefabricated elements never were created, as they were 50-foot floor beams, which would have been expensive and difficult to manipulate on the small site.

Dedication events were held from May 8 to 14, 1966, begun with a formal opening ceremony on the 8th.

In 1987, to accommodate its growth, the BAC purchased the adjoining building at 322 Newbury Street, a former carriage house built in 1899. The interior of the carriage house was renovated into administrative office space.

== Reception ==
The building was reviewed positively in the December 1966 issue of Architectural Forum. The journal called it an "aggressively prominent building" and a "good first lesson" to its students, architects, and the public. It recognized the design as fitting to its program and signifying the institution's importance to Boston.
