= Boston Architectural College =

College in Boston, Massachusetts

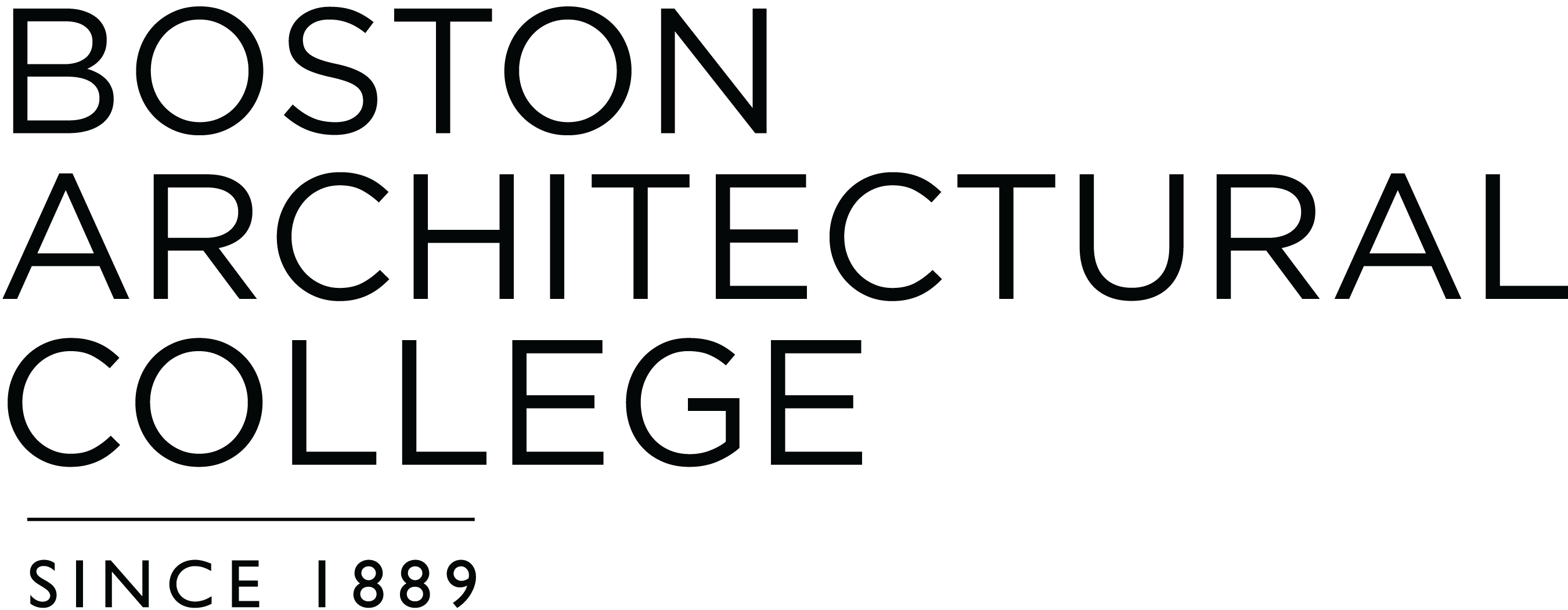
- Former names: Boston Architectural Club (1889–1944); Boston Architectural Center (1944–2006)
- Type: Private college
- Established: December 11, 1889; 136 years ago (as the Boston Architectural Club)
- Accreditation: NECHE
- Endowment: $12.2 million (2025)
- President: Mahesh Daas
- Faculty: 300 educators and professional practitioners
- Students: 700 degree students 300 continuing education students
- Location: Boston (Back Bay), Massachusetts, United States; 42.34792°N 71.08585°W
- Campus: 175 acres (71 ha); Urban, non-residential
- Website: the-bac.edu

The Boston Architectural College (BAC) is a private college in Boston. It is New England's largest private college of spatial design. The college's main building is at 320 Newbury Street in Boston's Back Bay neighborhood.

== History ==
=== Boston Architectural Club (1889–1944) ===
Boston Architectural Club was established on December 11, 1889. The certificate of incorporation explains that the club was formed "for the purpose of associating those interested in the profession of architecture with a view to mutual encouragement and help in studies, and acquiring and maintaining suitable premises, property, etc., necessary to a social club... and...for public lectures, exhibitions, classes, and entertainment." Members of the Club provided evening instruction for drafters employed in their offices. From this interchange, an informal atelier developed in the tradition of France's École des Beaux-Arts. The Club held annual public exhibitions and published illustrated catalogs. Bertrand E. Taylor was a charter member.

The BAC began its formal educational program under the joint leadership of Herbert Langford Warren and Clarence Blackall. The school was organized to offer an evening education in drawing, design, history, and structures. Like its informal predecessor, the BAC soon developed into an atelier affiliated with the Society of the École des Beaux-Arts in New York. The BAC's design curriculum, teaching methods, and philosophy closely resembled those of the École des Beaux-Arts.

In 1911, the club acquired a building at 16 Somerset Street on Beacon Hill. The BAC building contained a two-story Great Hall – designed by Ralph Adams Cram – as well as other spaces used for lectures, meetings and exhibitions, a library, and several studios. The newer facilities attracted more students, and the course of instruction became increasingly defined and formal.

In the 1930s most American schools of architecture broke away from the Beaux-Arts tradition and began to establish their own curricula and teaching methods. Without the support of a university structure, The Club struggled with the pains of growth and adjustment. The BAC appointed Arcangelo Cascieri to serve as dean. Cascieri brought the BAC through its philosophical transition without sacrificing the atelier teaching method. The BAC began to draw its faculty from nearby architectural schools and the extended local community of related professionals.

=== Boston Architectural Center (1944–2006) ===
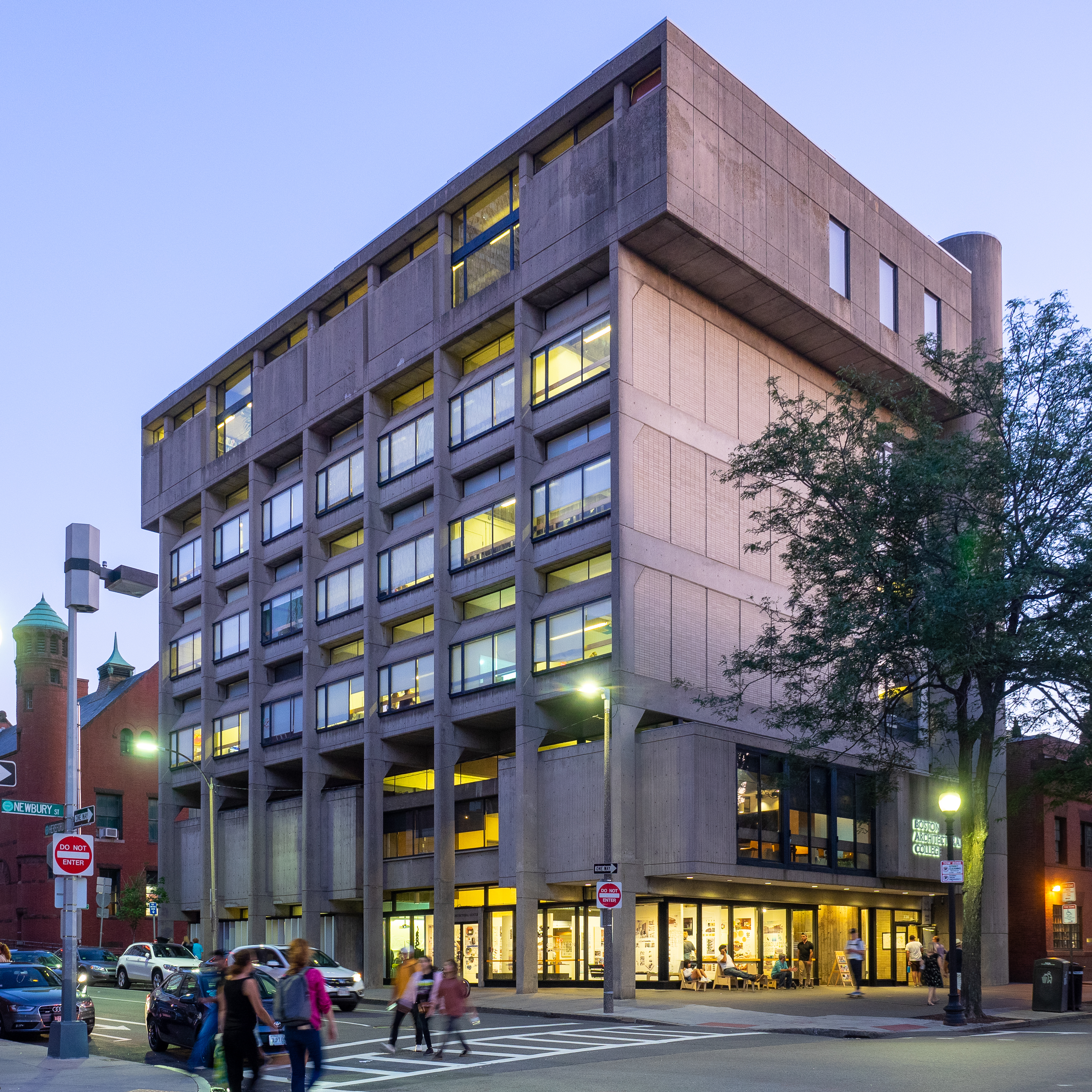
Main building, at 320 Newbury Street

The Club reorganized in 1944 as the Boston Architectural Center, with the mission "to provide instruction in architecture and related fields for draftsmen and others interested in the practice of architecture or the allied arts, especially those whose employment might interfere with such education in day schools and universities."

By 1965, the BAC had developed a continuing education program to serve the broader community. By the mid-1960s, the Somerset Street building no longer sufficed to serve the needs of the growing school, and the BAC purchased a brick building at 320 Newbury Street. A national design competition was held in 1964, and the winning entry, a Brutalist structure designed by Ashley, Myer & Associates, houses the BAC to this day.

=== Boston Architectural College (2006–present) ===
On July 1, 2006, The Boston Architectural Center formally adopted the new name Boston Architectural College (BAC) to more readily identify as a college awarding accredited professional degrees in architecture and design.

In 2007, BAC acquired 951/955 Boylston Street, the former home of the Institute of Contemporary Art, Boston, for $7.22 million. The building dates to 1887 and was originally used by the Boston Police Department, Division 16. The 25,423-square-foot (2,361.9 m^{2}) complex houses studios on the second and third floors and a lecture hall on the ground level. The first floor contains flexible gallery and lecture space. It also features, for the first time, a universally accessible entrance through the front doors of the building.

== Academics ==
The Boston Architectural College consists of four schools: School of Architecture, School of Interior Architecture, School of Landscape Architecture, and School of Design Studies. The college also offers classes through the Sustainable Design Institute (SDI) and the Continuing Education program.

=== Sustainable Design Institute ===
The Sustainable Design Institute (SDI) offers a completely online program of graduate-level courses, developed with Building Green, conferring certificates in sustainable design. Many courses are accepted for AIA Sustainable Design/Health, Safety, Welfare Learning Continuing Education Units; many have been approved as part of the US Green Building Council's Education Providers Program, and offer continuing education credits for LEED APs, and most are accepted by the Royal Institute of British Architects for Continuing Professional Development.

=== Landscape Institute ===
The Landscape Institute offers continuing education courses in landscape design, landscape design history, landscape preservation, and planting design and is the longest running program of its kind.

The Landscape Design Program was established through the Radcliffe Seminars in 1970. It was the result of positive feedback from a 1968 lecture at Radcliffe, The Intellectual History of Garden Art. The institute moved to Harvard University's Arnold Arboretum in 2002 and would later become a part of the BAC in 2009. Though now an institute of the BAC, the Landscape Institute curriculum still involves partnerships with the Arnold Arboretum in addition to partnerships with The Olmsted Center for Landscape Preservation, Historic New England, and the Wakefield Trust.

=== Continuing Education Program ===
The BAC offers a Continuing Education program. The college is also a registered AIA provider for Continuing Education.

=== Accreditation ===
BAC is accredited by the New England Commission of Higher Education and the college's first-professional degrees are professionally accredited by the National Architectural Accrediting Board (NAAB), Council for Interior Design Accreditation (CIDA, formerly FIDER), and the Landscape Architectural Accreditation Board (LAAB). It is also a member of the ProArts Consortium.

== Campus ==
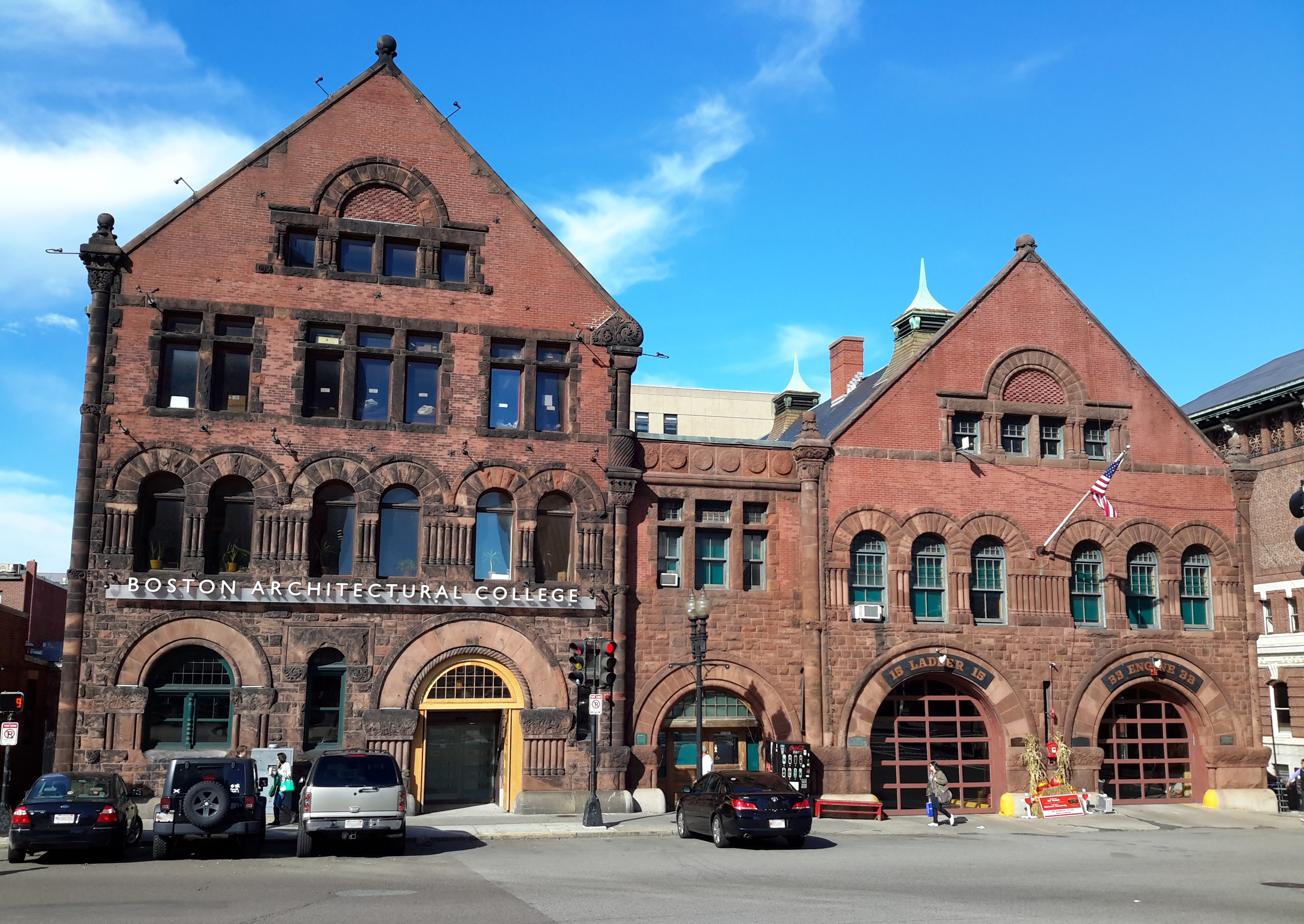
951/955 Boylston Street; the rightmost large doors house a Boston Fire Department station

Facilities at the BAC are referred to by their addresses. The college purchased 951/955 Boylston Street, which was vacated by the Institute of Contemporary Art, Boston, when it moved to the Boston waterfront in 2006. The college is planning major work on the 320/322 Newbury and 951/955 Boylston properties towards the goal of making both properties and the surrounding cityscape more sustainable by reducing rainwater runoff and powering the campus facilities with a geothermal well. The current plan also calls for improvements on the public alley between 320/322 Newbury and 951/955 Boylston.

=== 320 and 322 Newbury Street ===
320 Newbury Street is a Brutalist building designed by the firm of Ashley, Myer & Associates in 1966 and renovated in 2000 by Silverman Trykowski Associates. The design intended for the building "... not to depend on a sense of weight to achieve importance but rather, through the energy of form, to evoke a sense of aliveness and contending." The design uses cantilevered, suspended masonry masses and accentuated vertical "slits" in the exterior by which some of the building's core functions can be seen from the outside. Open studio floors allow students to look in on one another's classes and studios, and the ground floor, open to Newbury Street, invites the general public into the McCormick Gallery.

The program for the new building originally had specified capacity for 200 students with 30 to 50 square feet (4.6 m^{2}) of space allocated to each student. Several floors were designed to be rented until the school required them. Growth of the student body, however, proceeded more rapidly than anticipated, and the number of students gradually increased to as many as 650 in 1974. The "extra floors" were never rented, and the expanding student body and staff needed to support them quickly placed demands on all existing space.

In 1987, to accommodate its growth, the BAC purchased the adjoining building at 322 Newbury Street, a former carriage house built in 1899. The interior of the carriage house was renovated into administrative office space.

The west elevation of the building is articulated with a mural by the artist Richard Haas, which was completed in 1975. The trompe-l'œil mural of a Classical-style building and dome provides a contrast to the Brutalist style of the building.

=== McCormick Gallery ===
The BAC operates a gallery on the main level of its 320 Newbury Street building. The McCormick Gallery features student work as well as themed spatial design exhibits. The gallery is free and open to the public, and is prominently located at the corner of Newbury Street and Hereford.

== Traditions ==
- The Bee: The bee is somewhat of an informal mascot of the BAC, the roots of which can be traced to the "Cascieri Beehive", a nickname for a sculpture by Dean Arcangelo Cascieri titled Selfless Labor depicting bees working together in a beehive. It is featured on the BAC class ring, the medal awarded to Cascieri Lecturers, and has become the name of the BAC's weekly running club, the BAC Bees.

== Notable people ==
- Walter Atherton, architect
- Maya Bird-Murphy, architectural designer and educator
- Arcangelo Cascieri, sculptor
- Charles L. Fletcher, architect and interior designer; owner of Charles Fletcher Design
- Glenn Gissler, interior designer and president of Glenn Gissler Design, Inc
- Wallace Harrison, architect
- William Sutherland Maxwell, architect, Hands of the Cause in the Baháʼí Faith
- Louis Skidmore, co-founder of SOM
- Edward Durell Stone, architect
- Stewart Wurtz, studio furniture maker
