= Ginn & Company =

- Ginn and Heath, circa 1875
- Status: Defunct
- Founded: 1868
- Founder: Edwin Ginn, Daniel Collamore Heath
- Successor: Xerox; Simon & Schuster; Pearson Education
- Country of origin: United States
- Headquarters location: Boston, Massachusetts
- Publication types: Textbooks

Ginn & Company was an American textbook publisher founded by Edwin Ginn with his brother Fred in 1867, as Ginn Brothers. In 1876 it became Ginn & Heath (with Daniel Collamore Heath), and in 1885 it was established as Ginn & Company.

The imprint's first educational book was The English of Shakespeare by George Lillie Craik. Their Grade School Music Readers, by Luther Whiting Mason, were, for some time, a standard music textbook in American schools.

Ginn built the Athenaeum Press in Cambridge, Massachusetts in 1895 to house its printing operations, and the company's main offices moved to a brownstone on the site of the former Hancock Manor in 1901. The typeface Century Schoolbook was commissioned by Ginn in 1919 to be used as an easy-to-read type for textbooks. A silent film was created in 1925 to showcase how Ginn produced books at the Athenaeum Press.

The publisher was acquired by Xerox in 1968 during a surge in acquisitions of traditional textbook publishers by technology companies that included the acquisition of D. C. Heath by Raytheon a couple years earlier. Xerox would later sell Ginn to Simon & Schuster who merged it in the 1980s with another acquisition, Silver Burdett Press, to form the imprint Silver Burdett & Ginn. Pearson PLC acquired Simon & Schuster's educational businesses in 1998 to form Pearson Education, and closed down the Silver Burdett & Ginn imprint in 1999.
