= Trident Booksellers and Cafe =

Bookshop and cafe in Boston, Massachusetts, U.S.

- Type: Private
- Industry: Retail; Bookshop
- Founded: 1984 (42 years ago)
- Founders: Bernie Flynn; Gail Flynn
- Headquarters: 338 Newbury Street, Boston, Massachusetts, U.S.
- Number of locations: 1
- Products: Books, food and drink
- Website: tridentbookscafe.com

Trident Booksellers and Cafe is a book retailer in Boston, Massachusetts, United States. Located at 338 Newbury Street, in a building dating to 1886, the store was established in 1984 by Bernie and Gail Flynn.

It is one of the few remaining independent bookstores in Boston, and (as of 2022) one of the last 4,000 or so in the United States.

== History ==
Bernie Flynn formerly owned a bookstore, Northern Lights, in St. Johnsbury, Vermont, which opened in 1976. After moving to Newton, Massachusetts, in the early 1980s, he opened Trident Booksellers with his wife.

Originally one floor, Trident expanded to part of the building's second floor in September 2012. Twelve years later, it took over that floor in its entirety, naming it The Stacks.

In 2018, Trident was forced to close briefly after a fire. The water suppressant flooded the store and damaged its inventory.

Bernie Flynn, a Vermont native, died in 2026, aged 76.

As of 2026, the business is run by the Flynns' daughter and daughter-in-law.
