= Daniel Collamore Heath =

American publisher (1843–1908)

Daniel Collamore Heath (1843-1908)

Daniel Collamore Heath (1843–1908) was the founder of D. C. Heath and Company, part of Houghton Mifflin.

== Biography ==
Ginn and Heath, the predecessor to D.C. Heath and Co.

Daniel C. Heath was born in Salem, Maine on October 26, 1843. He studied at Nichols Latin School and Bates College (then called the Maine State Seminary) before graduating from Amherst College in 1868. Heath worked as a high school principal for two years before briefly attending Bangor Theological Seminary. After traveling through Europe for a year, Heath returned to the United States and worked for Edwin Ginn, a publisher. Together they started a firm called Ginn & Heath. Heath then sold his interest in the company and founded D. C. Heath and Company in Boston in 1886.

He married Nellie Jones Knox on January 6, 1881, and they had four children.

He died at his home in Newtonville, Massachusetts on January 29, 1908.
