= 2014 Boston brownstone fire =

Fatal fire in Boston, Massachusetts

Coordinates: 42°21′11.01″N 71°4′55.84″W

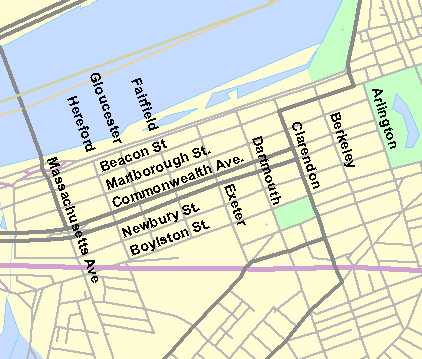
- Map of the Back Bay neighborhood of Boston, including Beacon Street
- Date: March 26, 2014 (12 years ago)
- Time: 2:42 p.m. (alarm struck) to 7:40 a.m. (all companies out)
- Location: 298 Beacon Street, Back Bay, Boston, Massachusetts, U.S
- Cause: Attributed to sparks from nearby welding
- Deaths: 2
- Injuries: 18

On March 26, 2014, at 2:42 p.m., a nine-alarm fire broke out in a four-story brick row house at 298 Beacon Street in the Back Bay neighborhood of Boston, Massachusetts. Two Boston Fire Department (BFD) firefighters died fighting the blaze: Lieutenant Edward J. Walsh, 43, of West Roxbury, and Firefighter Michael Kennedy, 33, of Hyde Park. Walsh and Kennedy were members of Engine Company 33 and Ladder Company 15, respectively, operating from the fire house at 941 Boylston Street.

The fire also injured 18 others, including 13 firefighters. The fire was believed to have been started by welders working on a nearby iron railing. On June 9, 2014, a report was released concluding that Walsh and Kennedy's deaths were both accidental.

== Fire ==
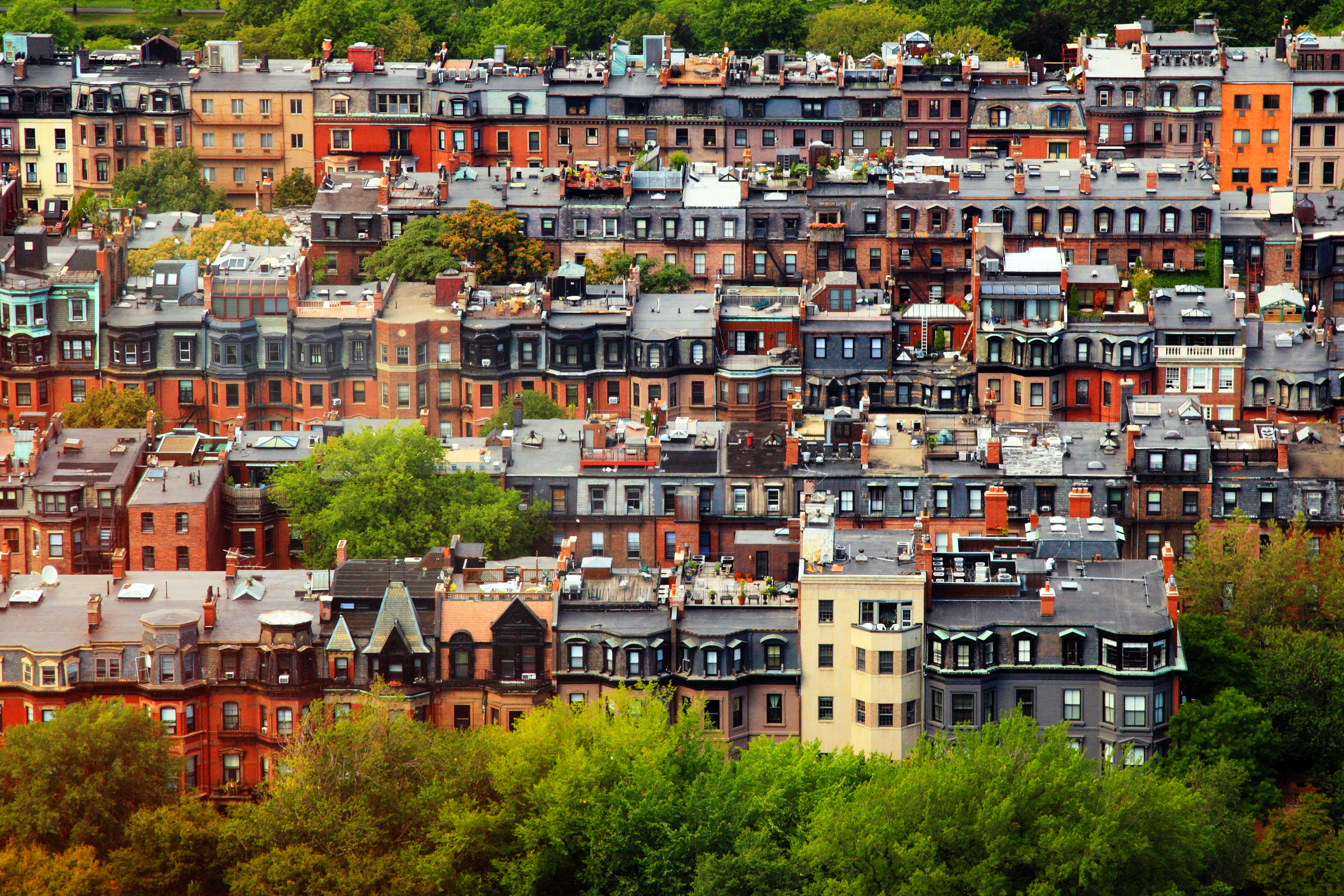
Back Bay brownstone houses

Firefighters responded at 2:42 p.m., where a fire was spreading upward from the basement fanned by winds traveling at 40 miles per hour (64 km/h). The fire companies that Walsh and Kennedy were assigned to were the first to arrive at the scene. Firefighters rushed into the building to rescue residents from the upper floors while Walsh and Kennedy ran with a hose down to the basement, where the fire was believed to have originated. The District Fire Chief in charge ordered a second alarm immediately.

A basement window had broken open and allowed high winds to further fuel the fire, which scorched at both men. Two to three minutes into the incident, the men placed a "Mayday" call over their radios signaling they were trapped. Despite rescue efforts, it took about half an hour to recover Kennedy, who was then transported to Massachusetts General Hospital, where he was pronounced dead. Another 13 firefighters were injured during the search, though their injuries were not life-threatening. A small explosion knocked a number of firefighters down a staircase inside the row house, causing burns and musculoskeletal injuries. It took firefighters until the evening to recover Walsh, who was pronounced dead at the scene.

Some of the apartments' residents were rescued from the top floor of the brownstone building, but none were hurt. The fire marked the first time a Boston firefighter had been killed on the job since 2009. Among those who witnessed the fire was Tom Brady, who decided to evacuate with his wife after watching it unfold from their neighboring home.

== Victims ==
Walsh and Kennedy died after the fire trapped them in the basement of the brownstone and prevented their colleagues from rescuing them. It has also been suggested that the strong winds that helped fuel the fire also triggered an explosion, which also trapped them in the basement. The precise reason the firefighters died after getting trapped remains unknown, but one proposed scenario involves the fire burning through their hose line, cutting off their ability to fight the fire around them.

== Investigation ==
On April 4, a number of fire officials, including Boston Fire Commissioner John Hasson, blamed the fire on sparks originating from welding being done on a nearby iron railing. The welders, according to these officials, were operating without a permit and apparently tried to warn others after the fire started. However, the welders did not call 9-1-1, which prompted state senator Ken Donnelly and other Massachusetts politicians to call for criminal charges to be brought against the welding company.

On April 22, the Boston Herald reported that Franklin Knotts, the property manager of the building where the fire killed the two firefighters (located at 298 Beacon Street), had filed an affidavit against D&J Iron Works, the Malden-based welding company whose employees had been blamed for starting the fire. In his affidavit, Knotts accused the employees working on the railing on an adjacent building (located on 296 Beacon Street) of driving away from the fire in their truck. The lawsuit itself was filed by Herbert Lerman, the executor of the estate of the building's owner, Michael J. Callahan. The supposed president of D&J Iron Works, Giuseppe Falcone, responded that this company does not exist and that he was therefore not responsible for the fire in any way.

A criminal investigation formally concluded in April 2015. No criminal charges were pressed against D&J Iron Works for the nine-alarm fire, and according to a statement from Suffolk County District Attorney Daniel F. Conley, the yearlong in-depth investigation revealed that while carelessness caused a pair of welders to accidentally start the fire at 298 Beacon St. on March 26, 2014, their actions did not constitute reckless or knowing endangerment of human life—hence, no involuntary manslaughter charges. “We cannot in good faith seek criminal charges for an accident, even one with consequences so tragically devastating,” said Conley. “Some 60 years of Massachusetts jurisprudence have made clear that negligence, even gross negligence, is in the hands of our civil courts.”

In March 2016, a report released by the National Institute for Occupational Safety and Health (NIOSH) concluded that the Boston Fire Department was partly to blame for the deaths of Walsh and Kennedy, citing "a lack of training, inadequate staffing, and failure to identify the high-risks involved with the blaze."

== Memorials ==
The funeral for Walsh was held on April 2, 2014, at St. Patrick's Church in Watertown, Massachusetts. Thousands of firefighters attended the service, as did Archbishop Sean O'Malley. Walsh was buried next to his father, also a former firefighter. Marty Walsh, the mayor of Boston, appeared at the funeral, and said, "We stand in awe of what he did last week." Edward Walsh's widow, Kristen, asked the Boston Fire Department to find her husband's wedding ring, which they were able to do, after which they gave it to her. Another funeral was held for Kennedy the following day, at Holy Name Church. Kennedy's cousin, Davin Patrick Kennedy, was among those who spoke at the service.

== Timeline ==
Below is a timeline of events that took place prior to and during the fire.

Time	Incident
2:42 p.m.	First alarm struck. Box 1579, Beacon St., and Exeter St. was struck by the BFD's Fire Alarm Office (FAO) for #298 Beacon St., located in the BFD's 4th Fire Response District. Engine Company 33 was one of six fire companies to respond on the first alarm.
2:45 p.m.	Rapid Intervention and Fireground Rehabilitation fire companies are assigned to the fire.
2:48 p.m.	Second alarm struck for Box 1579 by the orders of Car 4 (District Chief Shafer of the 4th District).
2:50 p.m.	Mayday transmitted by Engine Company 33.
2:52 p.m.	Car 3 (District Chief Mackin of the 3rd District) reports a back-draft.
2:53 p.m.	Third and fourth alarms struck for Box 1579 by the orders of Car 3 (District Chief Mackin of the 3rd District).
2:57 p.m.	Fifth alarm struck for Box 1579 by orders of C6 (Deputy Chief Finn of the 1st Division).
3:08 p.m.	Sixth and seventh alarms struck for Box 1579 by orders of C6 (Deputy Chief Finn of the 1st Division).
3:10 p.m.	One additional Engine Company special called on the seventh alarm for Box 1579 by orders of C6 (Deputy Chief Finn of the 1st Division).
3:13 p.m.	Eighth and ninth alarms struck for Box 1579 by orders of C6 (Deputy Chief Finn of the 1st Division).
3:28 p.m.	One additional Ladder Company special called on the ninth alarm for Box 1579 by orders of C6 (Deputy Chief Finn of the 1st Division).
3:49 p.m.	One additional Tower Ladder Company special called on the ninth alarm for Box 1579 by orders of C6 (Deputy Chief Finn of the 1st Division).
4:31 p.m.	One additional Engine Company special called on the ninth alarm for Box 1579 by orders of G1 (Deputy Chief Laizza of the Emergency Management Division).
7:40 a.m. (3/27)	All companies out.
6:43 p.m. (3/27)	Detail terminated.
