= Parkman Plaza =

Plaza in Boston Common, Massachusetts, U.S.

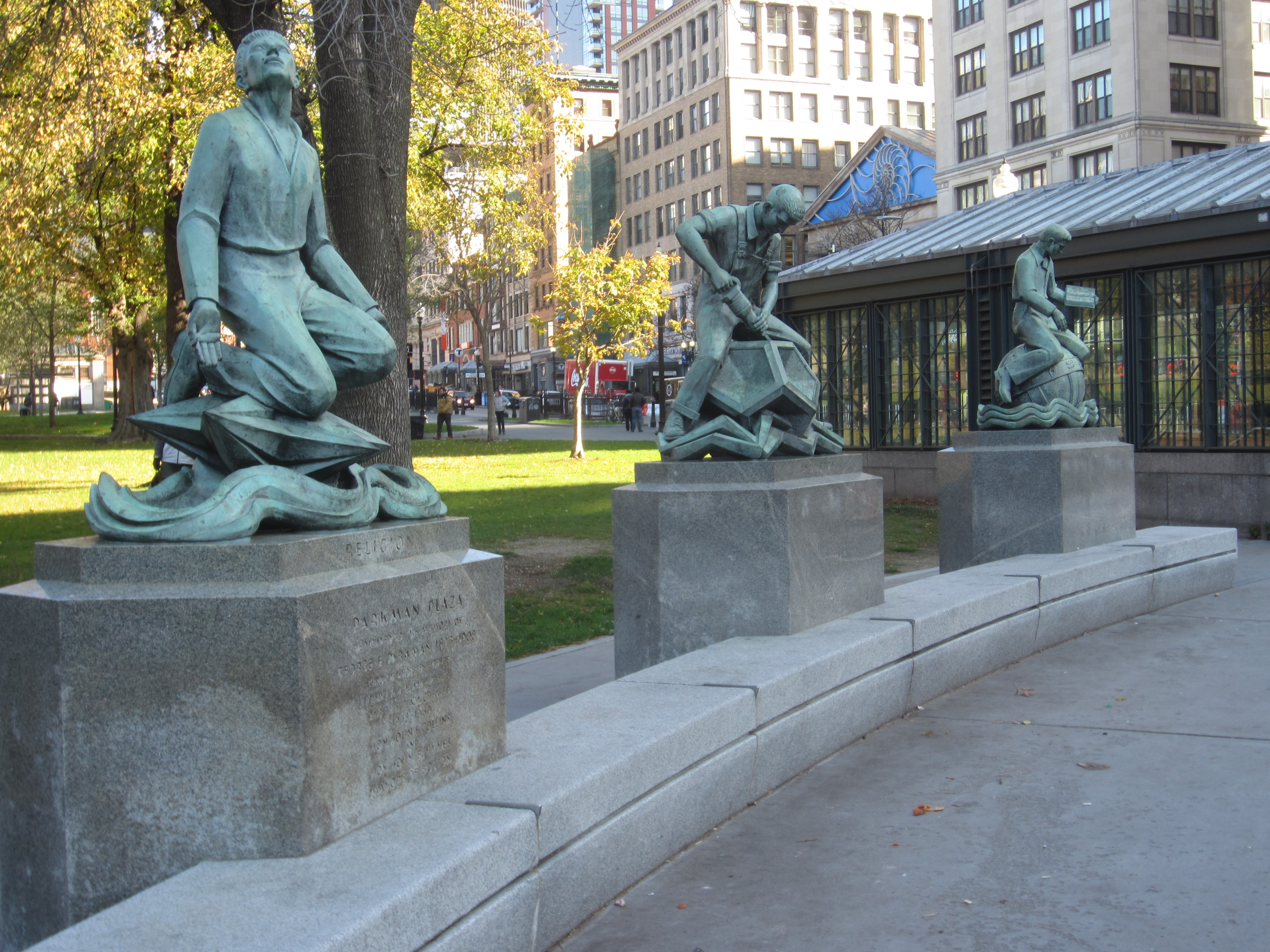
- The plaza's three statues in 2019

- Location within Boston
- Type: Plaza
- Location: Boston, Massachusetts
- Coordinates: 42°21′19.7″N 71°3′48.7″W

Parkman Plaza is a plaza in Boston Common, in Boston, Massachusetts, United States.

== Description ==
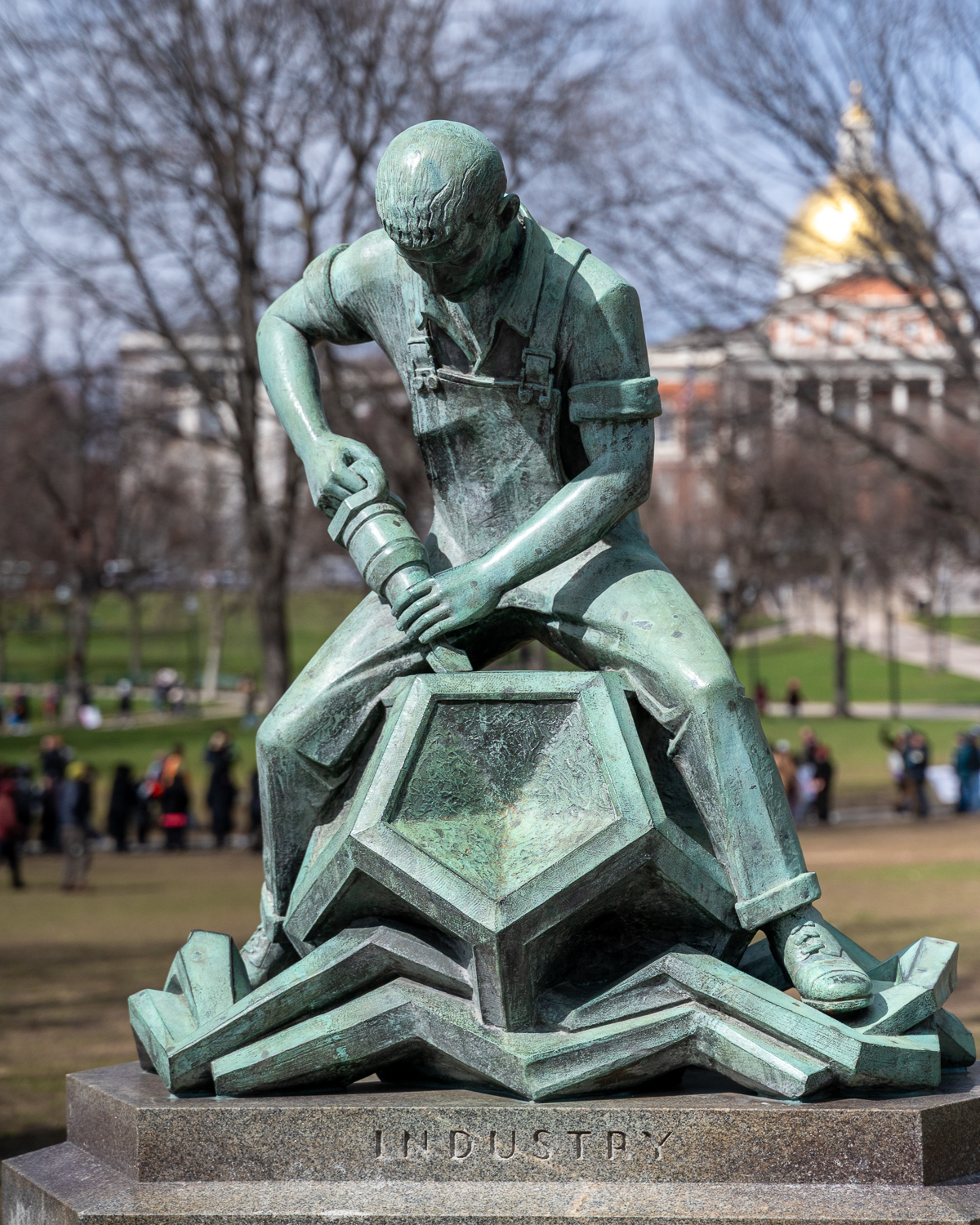
Industry - Parkman Plaza

The plaza features three bronze statues of men representing Learning, Industry, and Religion, each of which are set on granite bases. Learning depicts a seated figure using a compass while reading a book. Industry shows a man using a jackhammer. Religion depicts a man kneeing with his arms extended.

An inscription on the base of Religion reads: "PARKMAN PLAZA / DEDICATED TO THE MEMORY OF / GEORGE F. PARKMAN 1823-1908 /LAFAYETTE MALL WAS IMPROVED AND THIS PLAZA CREATED 1958-1960 BY HON. JOHN F. COLLINS AND HON. JOHN HYMES MAYORS OF BOSTON, MARTIN F. WALSH, FRANK R. KELLEY, HARRY J. BLAKE, THOMAS J. CARTY, DANIEL G. O'CONNOR, O. PHILIP SNOWDEN. PARKS & RECREATION COMMISSION, SHURCLIFF & MERRILL LANDSCAPE ARCHITECTS, CASCIERE AND DI BICCARIA SCULPTURE".

== History ==
The sculptures were commissioned by the George F. Parkman Fund, and surveyed by the Smithsonian Institution's "Save Outdoor Sculpture!" program in 1993.
