= 941–955 Boylston Street =

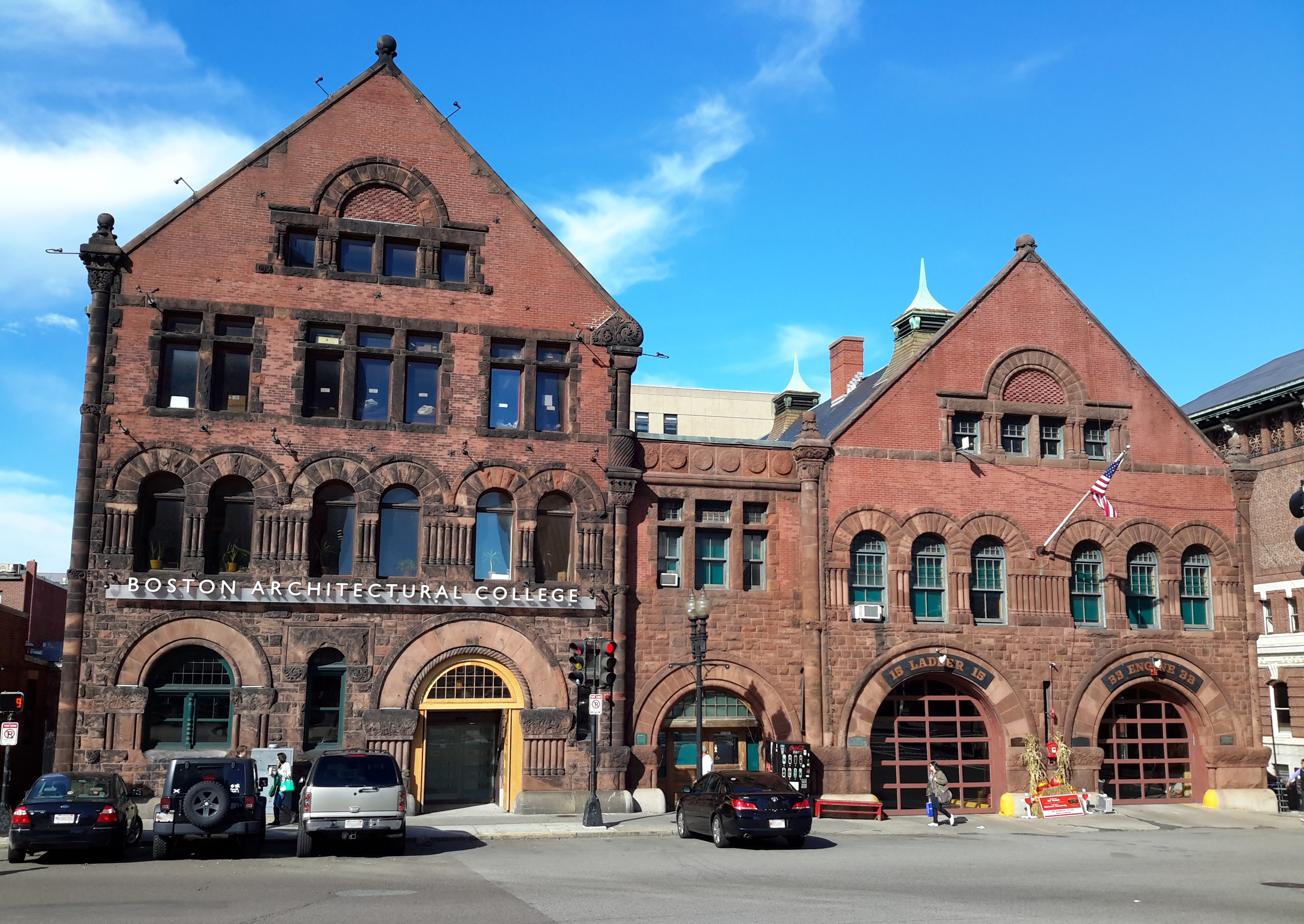
- Interactive map of the 941–955 Boylston Street area

General information
- Architectural style: Richardsonian Romanesque
- Location: Boston, Massachusetts, United States
- Coordinates: 42.34806°N 71.08566°W
- Completed: 1887
- Client: City of Boston

Design and construction
- Architect: Arthur H. Vinal

941–955 Boylston Street is a historic building in the Back Bay district of Boston, Massachusetts. Formerly a combined fire and police station, the fire station remains in active use by the Boston Fire Department. The building has been designated a Boston Landmark by the Boston Landmarks Commission.

== History ==
The building, located on Boylston Street, was designed by Arthur H. Vinal in 1886, while he was City Architect, as the city's first combined fire and police station. The building, constructed in 1887, is in the Richardsonian Romanesque style, as was Vinal's most notable other work, the Chestnut Hill Water Works pumping station, built at about the same time.

The fire station at 941 Boylston Street, which is still active, houses Boston Fire Department Engine Company 33 and Ladder Company 15. The police station at 955 Boylston Street was home to Boston Police Department Division 16 until 1976. From 1976 to 2007, the police station was home to the Institute of Contemporary Art; in 2007 it was acquired by Boston Architectural College for $7.22 million.

A courtyard between the two buildings originally led to shared stables for fire department and police horses. Division 16 later added a single-story building immediately to the west (out of frame in the photo above). By 1976, the advent of motorized patrols had led to a consolidation of Boston's smaller police divisions, including Division 16, into larger police districts, resulting in the closure and redevelopment of the police station.

Plaques on the Boylston Street facade memorialize four Boston firefighters who died in the line of duty: Cornelius J. Noonan (d. 1938), Richard F. Concannon (d. 1961), Richard B. Magee (d. 1972), and Stephen F. Minehan (d. 1994).

== See also ==
- 2014 Boston brownstone fire, which resulted in the deaths of two firefighters from the fire station at 941 Boylston Street
