= Edwin Ginn =

American publisher (1838-1914)

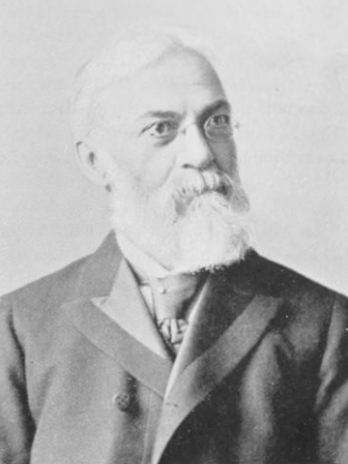
- Born: February 14, 1838; Orland, Maine, USA
- Died: January 21, 1914 (aged 75); Winchester, Massachusetts
- Education: Tufts University
- Occupation: Textbook publisher
- Known for: International School of Peace, now known as the World Peace Foundation
- Movement: World peace
- Spouse: Married twice
- Children: 6

Signature
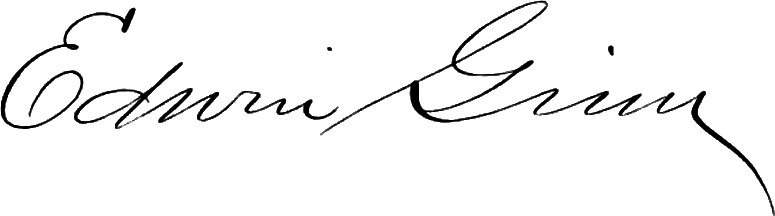

Edwin Ginn (February 14, 1838 – January 21, 1914) was an American publisher, peace advocate and philanthropist.

== Biography ==
Ginn and Heath Publishing in Maine

Ginn was born in Orland, Maine, on February 14, 1838, into a Universalist farming family who were descendants of early settlers of Maryland, Virginia, and Salem, Massachusetts. He attended Westbrook Seminary, a Universalist preparatory school. Forgoing the ministry, he enrolled instead at Tufts University in 1858. He graduated from Tufts with a Bachelor of Arts degree in 1862, receiving his Masters of Arts at the same time.

After graduation, Ginn had a successful career selling schoolbooks. In 1868, he founded Ginn & Company, which became a leading American textbook publisher. The company was later known as Ginn and Heath.

Ginn married twice, fathering six children. In his late 50s, Ginn turned his focus to philanthropy: the American peace movement was his primary concern.

Ginn died on January 21, 1914, at his home in Winchester, Massachusetts, after suffering from a paralytic stroke and pneumonia a month earlier. A library is named after him at Tufts's Fletcher School of Law and Diplomacy.

== Peace movement ==
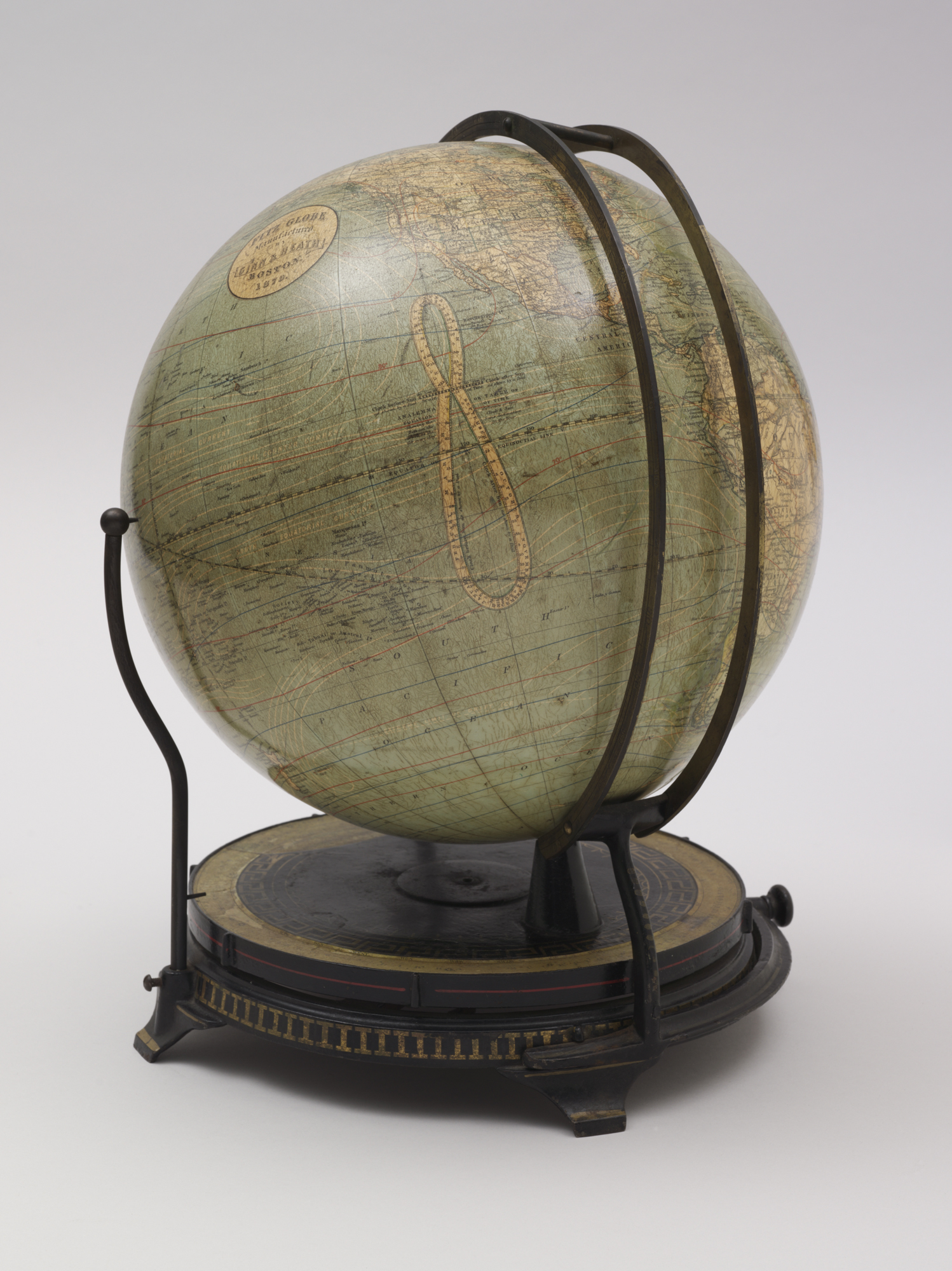
Globe manufactured by Ginn and Heath in 1879

Influenced by Edward Everett Hale, a pastor of Boston's South Congregational Church, Ginn dedicated himself to the cause and the possibility of peace. On July 12, 1910, through a $1 million endowment, he founded the International School of Peace in Boston. whose purpose was "Educating the people of all nations to a full knowledge of the waste and destructiveness of war and of preparation for war, its evil effects on present social conditions and on the wellbeing of future generations, and to promote international justice and the brotherhood of man, and generally by every practical means to promote peace and goodwill among all mankind. The school later became the World Peace Foundation. In 2007, Robert I. Rotberg published A Leadership for Peace: How Edwin Ginn Tried to Change the World (ISBN 0804754551).
