= Mann (surname) =

Mann‌ is a surname of Germanic origin. It means 'man, person, husband'.

Mann (or Maan) is also a clan name found among Jats.

Notable people with this surname include:

== A ==
- Aarti Mann, or Aarti Majumdar (born 1978), American actress
- Abby Mann (1927–2008), American film writer and producer
- Aimee Mann (born 1960), American rock guitarist, bass player, singer, and songwriter
- Alakina Mann (born 1990), English actress
- Alex Mann (bobsleigh) (born 1980), German bobsledder
- Alfred Mann (musicologist) (1917–2006), American writer
- Alfred E. Mann (1925–2016), American entrepreneur and philanthropist
- Ammtoje Mann, Punjabi actor and director
- Anthony Mann (1906–1967), American actor and film director
- Arthur Henry Mann (1850–1929), English organist, choirmaster, teacher and composer at King's College Chapel, Cambridge

== B ==
- B. B. Mann (1858–1948), Wales national rugby union player
- Barry Mann (born 1939), American songwriter
- Ben Mann (born 2002), American football player
- Benjamin Pickman Mann (1848–1926), American naturalist and educator
- Bernhard Mann (born 1950), German sociologist and public-health scholar
- Bhagwant Mann (born 1973), Indian politician and comedian
- Billy Mann (born 1968), American record producer/singer/songwriter
- Bonnie Mann, American philosopher
- Braden Mann (born 1997), American football player
- Brandon Mann (born 1984), American professional baseball player
- Bruce Mann (disambiguation), several people

== C ==
- Carol Mann (1941–2018), American championship golfer
- Charles Mann (disambiguation), several people
- Colette Mann (born 1950), Australian actress
- Coramae Richey Mann (1931–2004), American professor emeritus of criminal justice at the University of Illinois
- Curtis Mann (1815–1894), American businessman and politician

== D ==
- Daniel Mann (1912–1991), American film director
- Daniel Mann (lawyer) (born 1980), American legal scholar
- David Mann (disambiguation), several people
- Delbert Mann (1920–2007), American television and film director
- Denis Mann (born 1935), Scottish glass artist
- Dhar Mann (born 1984), Indian American entrepreneur and film producer
- Dick Mann (1934–2021), American motorcycle racer
- Dieter Mann (1942–2022), German actor
- Donald Mann (1853–1934), Canadian railway contractor and entrepreneur
- Douglas L. Mann, American physician
- Douglas Mann (politician), Missouri politician
- Duane Mann (born 1965), New Zealand rugby league footballer

== E ==
- Edna Mann (1926–1985), English painter
- Edward S. Mann (1908–2005), American educator and former president of the Eastern Nazarene College
- Elisabeth Mann Borgese (1918–2002), German environmentalist, daughter of Thomas Mann
- Erica Mann (1917–2007), Austrian-born architect and town planner
- Erika Mann (1905–1969), German actress and writer, daughter of Thomas Mann
- Erika Mann (politician) (born 1950), German politician and Member of the European Parliament with the political party SPD
- Eugenia St. John Mann (1847–1932), American evangelist and temperance lecturer

== F ==
- Franceska Mann (1917–1943), Polish dancer
- Frank Mann (disambiguation), several people

== G ==
- Gabriel Mann (born 1972), American actor
- George Mann (disambiguation), several people
- Gloria Mann, American pop singer
- Golo Mann (1909–1994), German popular historian and author, son of Thomas Mann
- Gother Mann (1746–1830), Lieutenant-General, Royal Engineers, Inspector-General of Fortifications
- Gother Victor Fyers Mann (1863–1948), Australian architect, artist and Director of the Art Gallery of New South Wales
- Gottfried Mann (1858–1904), Dutch composer, conductor, and musician
- Gustav Mann (1836–1916), German botanist

== H ==
- Harbhajan Mann, Punjabi singer and actor
- Harold Hart Mann (1872–1961), English agricultural scientist who worked in India
- Heinrich Mann (1871–1950), German novelist, brother of Thomas Mann
- Henry Mann (1905–2000), American mathematician and statistician (born in Vienna, Austria)
- Herbie Mann (1930–2003), American jazz flautist and practitioner of world music
- Holger Mann (born 1979), German politician
- Homer B. Mann (1869–1950), American college president, insurance businessman and politician
- Horace Mann (1796–1859), American education reformer and abolitionist
- Horace Mann Jr. (1844–1868), American botanist, son of Horace Mann

== I ==
- Ian Mann, British space weather researcher

== J ==
- J. J. Mann, (born 1991), American basketball player
- Jack Mann (disambiguation), several people
- Jackie Mann (1914–1995), RAF fighter pilot, kidnapped in Lebanon in 1989
- Jacob Mann (1888–1940), Polish-American historian
- James Mann (disambiguation), several people
- Jessica Mann (1937–2018), British writer
- Jimmy Mann (disambiguation), several people
- John Mann (disambiguation), several people
- Jonathan Mann (disambiguation), several people
- Joseph Mann (disambiguation)

== K ==
- Kal Mann (1917–2001), American lyricist, writer of lyrics for several popular songs
- Kalman Mann (1912–1997), Israeli physician and director general of Hadassah Medical Center
- Karl-Rüdiger Mann (born 1950), German swimmer
- Kathryn Mann, mathematician
- Kevin Danell Mann, American rapper better known as Brotha Lynch Hung
- Klaus Mann (1906–1949), German writer, son of Thomas Mann

== L ==
- Larry Mann (1930–1952), American racecar (NASCAR) driver
- Larry D. Mann (1922–2014), Canadian radio personality and television/film actor
- Leslie Mann (born 1972), American actress
- Lisa Mann, American electric blues bassist, songwriter and singer
- Lorene Mann (1937–2013), American country music singer-songwriter
- Louis Mann (1865–1931), American actor

== M ==
- Madeline Mann (born 1989), American who once held the record for being the smallest known premature baby to survive
- Manfred Mann (musician) (born 1940), musician from South Africa, after whom the eponymous band was named
- Manjeet Mann, actress and author
- Marion Mann (1920–2022), American physician and pathologist
- Marion Mann (singer) (1914–2004), American singer
- Matthias Mann (born 1959), German scientist in the field of mass spectrometry and proteomics
- Marty Mann (1904–1980), first woman to achieve long-term sobriety in Alcoholics Anonymous
- Maureen Mann (1944–2023), American politician
- Merlin Mann (born 1966), American writer and editor; author of productivity blog 43folders.com
- Michael Mann (born 1943), American film director, screenwriter, and producer
- Michael Mann (scholar) (1919–1977), German-born American musician and professor of German literature, youngest son of Thomas Mann
- Michael Mann (sociologist) (born 1942), British-born professor of sociology at UCLA
- Michael E. Mann (born 1965), American climate scientist, professor, and member of United States National Academy of Sciences (NAS)
- Monika Mann (1910–1992), German novelist, daughter of Thomas Mann
- Moshe Mann (1907–2004), Israeli military officer who was the first commander of the Golani Brigade

== N ==
- Nancy Mann, American statistician
- Natalia Mann, 21st-century New Zealand classical harpist
- Nicole Aunapu Mann (born 1977), American astronaut

== O ==
- Olly Mann (born 1981), British broadcaster and podcaster

== P ==
- Paul Mann (1913–1985), Canadian film and theater actor
- Perminder Mann, British book publisher
- Phillip Mann (1942–2022), British / New Zealand academic and author

== R ==
- Ralph Mann (1949–2025), American sprinter and hurdler
- Richie Mann (born 1954), Canadian politician
- Robert Mann (1920–2018), American violinist and composer, founder of the Juilliard String Quartet
- Ron Mann (born 1959), Canadian documentary film director
- Ronnie Mann (born 1986), English mixed martial arts fighter

== S ==
- Sally Mann (born 1951), American photographer
- Segol Mann (1918–1992), Swedish actor
- Sharry Mann, Punjabi songwriter and singer
- Shwe Mann (born 1947), Myanmar high-ranked military commander and government official
- Simon Mann (1952–2025), British Army officer and convicted mercenary
- Simon Mann (cricket commentator) (born 1963), British broadcaster
- Simon Mann (racing driver) (born 2001), British-American racing driver
- Steve Mann (American guitarist) (1943–2009), American songwriter and guitarist
- Steve Mann (English musician), English guitarist, keyboardist, record producer and engineer
- Steve Mann (inventor) (born 1962), Canadian professor, founder of the field of wearable computing

== T ==
- Tamela Mann (born 1966), American Gospel singer
- Ted Mann (1916–2001), American theatre chain owner
- Terance Mann (born 1996), American basketball player
- Terrence Mann (born 1951), American singer and actor
- Thaddeus Mann (1908–1993), Polish-English biochemist
- Thomas Mann (1875–1955), German novelist, essayist, Nobel Prize laureate
- Thomas Mann (disambiguation)
- Tom Mann (1856–1941), British trade unionist
- Tracey Mann (born 1976), US Representative from Kansas and former Lieutenant Governor
- Tracy Mann (born 1957), Australian actress
- Trevor Mann (born 1988), American professional wrestler known by his ring name Ricochet
- Troy Mann (born 1969), Canadian ice hockey coach
- Tufty Mann (1920–1952), South African cricketer

== W ==
- Wesley Mann (born 1959), American actor
- William Mann (disambiguation), several people

== See also ==
- Attorney General Mann (disambiguation)
- Justice Mann (disambiguation)
- Senator Mann (disambiguation)
- Manne
- Man (name), a given name and surname
- Maan (surname), a given name and surname
