= John Mann =

John Mann may refer to:

== Entertainment ==
- John Mann (British actor) (1915–1981), British radio actor
- John Mann (engineer), guitar engineer
- John Mann (musician) (1962–2019), Canadian folk-rock musician and actor
- Johnny Mann (1928–2014), American composer and recipient of multiple Grammy Awards

== Sports ==
- John Mann (Australian cricketer) (1919–1969), Australian cricketer
- John Mann (English cricketer) (born 1983), English cricketer
- John Mann (water polo) (born 1985), American water polo player
- J. J. Mann (born 1991), American basketball player
- John Pelham Mann (1919–2002), English cricketer and British Army officer
- Johnny Mann (baseball) (1898–1977), American baseball player
- Jack Mann (ice hockey) (John Edward Kingsley Mann, 1919–1980), Canadian ice hockey centre

== Politicians ==
- John Mann (Australian politician) (1869–1939), member of the Queensland Legislative Assembly
- Johnno Mann (John Henry Mann, 1896–1973), member of the Queensland Legislative Assembly
- John Mann, Baron Mann (born 1960), British politician
- John Mann (New Hampshire politician)

== Others ==
- John Frederick Mann (1819–1907), Australian surveyor and explorer
- John Mann (bishop) (1880–1967), English Anglican bishop

== See also ==
- Jackie Mann (1914–1995), British fighter pilot
- John Man (author) (born 1941), British author
- John Man (1512–1569), English churchman and diplomat
- Jack Mann (disambiguation)
- Jonathan Mann (disambiguation)
- Mann (surname)
