= Mann =

Mann may refer to:

== Arts, entertainment and media ==
- Mann (1999 film), an Indian Hindi-language romantic drama
- Mann (2006 film), a Tamil-language drama film
- Mann (chess), a variant chess piece
- Mann (magazine), a Norwegian magazine
- Mann (rapper), Dijon Shariff Thames (born 1991), American rapper
- Mann Theatres, a theatre chain corporation
- Bobby Mann, title character of Mann & Machine, a 1992 television series
- David and Toni Mann, protagonists of Mann & Wife, an American sitcom (2015–2017)
- Otto Mann, a fictional school bus driver in the TV series The Simpsons
- Dr. Mann, a character in Interstellar, a 2014 science fiction film
- Mann Co., a fictional company in Team Fortress 2

== People ==
- Mann (surname), people with the surname Mann
- Mann family, a German dynasty of novelists, including Thomas Mann, and an old Hanseatic patrician family
- Mann Spitler (1825–1889), American politician from Virginia

== Places ==
- Isle of Man (also Mann), an island nation in the Irish Sea
- Mann Island, Liverpool, England
- Mann, Central African Republic, a village in Lim-Pendé Prefecture
- Mann Township, Pennsylvania, United States
- Mann Lake, Oregon, United States
- Mann Lakes, Alberta, Canada, formerly one body of water named Mann Lake
- Mann River (disambiguation)

== Other uses ==
- Mann baronets, two titles, one in the Baronetage of Great Britain and one in the Baronetage of the United Kingdom
- Mann language, spoken in Guinea and Liberia
- Mann (paramilitary rank), a Nazi rank
- Mann (unit), an Arabic unit of mass
- Mann Auditorium, former name of the Heichal HaTarbut concert hall in Tel Aviv, Israel
- Mann Center for the Performing Arts, Philadelphia, Pennsylvania, United States
- MANN, the Italian abbreviation for the National Archaeological Museum, Naples

== See also ==
- Mann Act, an American federal law passed in 1910
- Mann Cup, awarded to the senior men's box lacrosse champions of Canada
- Mann House (disambiguation), various houses on the US National Register of Historic Places
- Maan (disambiguation)
- Man (disambiguation)
