= Henry Mann (disambiguation) =

Henry Mann (1905–2000) was a mathematician.

Henry Mann is also the name of:

- Henry F. Mann, inventor and blacksmith
- Harry Mann (Henry Willoughby Mann, 1873–1952), Australian police officer and politician
- Henry James Montague (Henry James Mann, 1844–1878), American actor
- Henry P. Mann (1858–1925), American politician from Maryland

== See also ==
- Henry Manne (1928–2015), American writer and academic
- Henry Man (disambiguation)
