= Man (name) =

Man is both a surname and a given name. Notable people with the name include:

== Surname ==
- Man Chong (died 242), a government official in the state of Cao Wei
- Felix H. Man (1893–1985), German photographer, photojournalist, and art collector
- Henry Man (disambiguation)
- John Man (1512–1569), English churchman, college head and diplomat
- Man Pei Tak (born 1982), Hong Kong footballer
- Phoebe Man (born 1969), Hong Kong artist
- Ralph Sandiford Man (1825–1906), American pioneer
- Janice Man (born 1988), Hong Kong actress

== Given name ==
- Man Kaur (1916–2021), Indian track-and-field athlete
- Man Mohan Adhikari (1920–1999), Prime Minister of Nepal
- Man Parrish (born 1958), American composer, songwriter, vocalist and producer
- Man Ray (1890-1976), American modernist artist
- Man Singh I (1550–1614), King of Amber (now Jaipur) and Mughal general
- Ip Man (1893–1972), Chinese martial artist
- Zhong Man (born 1983), Chinese saber fencer and 2008 Olympic gold medalist
- Man Haron Monis (1964–2014) Iranian-Australian Muslim cleric and criminal, perpetrator of 2014 Sydney siege

== See also ==
- Mann (surname)
- Wan (surname), romanized as Man in Cantonese
- Wen (disambiguation), romanized as Man in Cantonese
