= Mann House =

Mann House may refer to:

in the United States

(by state)

- Mann House (Forrest City, Arkansas), listed on the National Register of Historic Places (NRHP)
- John T. Mann House, Cave Spring, Georgia, listed on the NRHP in Floyd County, Georgia
- Mann House (Russell, Kansas), listed on the NRHP in Russell County, Kansas
- James H. Mann House, Winchester, Massachusetts, NRHP-listed
- Mann House (Concord, Michigan), NRHP-listed
- Mann-Zwonecek House, Wilber, Nebraska, NRHP-listed
- Henry Mann House, Albuquerque, New Mexico, NRHP-listed
- Mann-Simons Cottage, Columbia, South Carolina, NRHP-listed
- Irene and Walter Mann Ranch, Custer, South Dakota, listed on the NRHP in Custer County, South Dakota
- R.N. Mann House, Old Salem, Tennessee, NRHP-listed
- Brown-Mann House, McGregor, Texas, formerly listed on the NRHP in McLennan County, Texas
- John Wesley Mann House, Waco, Texas, listed on the NRHP in McLennan County, Texas
- John Mann House, Fitchburg, Wisconsin, NRHP-listed
- William G. Mann House, Waukesha, Wisconsin, listed on the NRHP in Waukesha County, Wisconsin
