= Lyn Swinburne =

Australian women's advocate

Lyn Swinburne, founder of Breast Cancer Network Australia

Lyn Mary Swinburne AO (born 6 June 1952) is an Australian women's advocate, inspirational speaker and founder of Breast Cancer Network Australia (BCNA).

== Career ==
Swinburne was diagnosed with breast cancer in 1993 and underwent surgery, radiotherapy, chemotherapy and hormone therapy. After that time, and as a result of her experiences, she became a committed advocate on behalf of women with breast cancer and their families.

In 1996, Swinburne began her work to establish Breast Cancer Network Australia, which was then formally launched in October 1998. BCNA is now the peak national breast cancer ‘consumer' organisation representing nearly 300 member groups and more than 110,000 individuals in all Australian states and territories. BCNA currently has a staff of more than 45 and a vast number of volunteers working for the organisation. Previously, Lyn had been a primary school teacher.

Swinburne is the creator of the Field of Women concept. This major public awareness and fundraising event, began in 1998 with the planting of 10,000 pink silhouettes (representing the number of Australians diagnosed with breast cancer that year) and 2,500 white silhouettes (representing the number who would die) on the lawns in front of Parliament House, Canberra. The Field of Women LIVE event evolved in later years, with major events in Melbourne 2005, Sydney 2007 and Melbourne 2010. This high-profile event involved many thousands of people standing together in pink ponchos in the shape of the Pink Lady silhouette. The Field of Women LIVE event at the MCG in 2010 was awarded the Meetings & Events Australia's Public Event of the Year. The Field of Women concept has now been taken up by various groups around the world and has become an annual event in some countries.

Swinburne established The Beacon magazine in 1996, with its current circulation of 70,000 and then The Inside Story magazine, the latter designed for women with secondary breast cancer. She led the development of the My Journey Kit, designed as a one-stop information shop’ for women recently diagnosed with breast cancer. This kit, has since been taken up and adapted by a range of cancer groups within Australia and internationally.

A passionate advocate for consumer input, Swinburne has represented women with breast cancer, and Australians affected by cancer, on a number of state, national and international committees. In 1998, she was appointed a Director of the National Breast and Ovarian Cancer Centre (NBOCC), a position she held by the appointment of respective Health Ministers until NBOCC was amalgamated with Cancer Australia in July 2011. In 2010, Swinburne was appointed as an Advisory Council member of Cancer Australia, a position she still holds.

Swinburne has been an invited speaker at numerous national and international conferences in New Zealand, Asia, the United States and Europe. In May 2006 she chaired the Third Breast Cancer Global Patient Group Summit, held in Stresa, Italy.

She has a passion for public speaking in general and has presented at corporate and educational forums across Australia. She is also well known for establishing and nurturing relationships within corporate Australia. The example of this is BCNA’s partnership with Bakers Delight which began in 2000, continues today and is frequently cited as standard practice in demonstrating community/corporate relationships.

In August 2010, Swinburne notified BCNA’s Board of Directors of her decision to step down as CEO at the end of the following year.

Swinburne has now established Lyn Swinburne Consulting and is continuing her passion for community/corporate engagement, public speaking, entrepreneurship and advocacy. She continues to be involved in several community-based enterprises including as an Advisory Council member to the City of Melbourne’s Melbourne Awards and a Selection Panel member for the Victorian Honour Roll of Women. As well, she is a member of Council at the Royal Melbourne Golf Club. She currently sits on a number of Boards including the Royal Women's Hospital, the Royal Women's Hospital Foundation, and Priceline Sisterhood Foundation. On July 1, 2015 she took up the role of Chair of the Royal Women's Hospital Board in Melbourne.

== Honours ==
In 2007, Swinburne was named Melburnian of the Year. The Queen's Birthday Honours of 2006 saw her appointed as a Member of the Order of Australia. In 2002, she was inducted onto the Victorian Honour Roll of Women and in 2003, was awarded the Centenary Medal in honour of her contribution to Australian society. In 2000, Swinburne was one of three Australians invited to sign the Charter of Paris Against Cancer at the Élysée Palace in the presence of President Jacques Chirac.

== Awards ==
- Finalist Australian of the Year Awards 2006
- Melburnian of the Year 2007
- Inducted Victorian Honour Roll of Women 2002
- Honorary Doctorate (Social Science) from Swinburne University 2015
- Centenary Medal 2003
- National Equity Trustees' Not for Profit CEO of the Year 2003
- Regional Finalist Ernst & Young Entrepreneur of the year 2003
- Victorian Telstra Business Woman of the Year (Community and Government Category) 2001
- Inducted Swinburne University’s Australian Graduate School of Entrepreneurship Hall of Fame 2008
- Inducted into Monash University’s Golden Key Society 2010
