= Breast Cancer Network Australia =

Australian non-profit organisation

- BCNA logo
- Abbreviation: BCNA
- Established: 1998
- Founder: Lyn Swinburne
- Legal status: charity
- Purpose: Support for Australians affected by breast cancer
- Location: Melbourne, Australia
- CEO: Kirsten Pilatti
- Website: www.bcna.org.au

Breast Cancer Network Australia (BCNA) is a not-for-profit organisation that supports Australians affected by breast cancer. BCNA aims to ensure that Australians affected by breast cancer receive support, information, treatment and care appropriate to their needs.

BCNA is an Australian organization for people affected by breast cancer, with a network of more than 120,000 individual members and 300 member groups.

== History ==
In 1998, Lyn Swinburne envisaged an organization that would positively influence the way breast cancer was discussed in the community. Her goal was for people to talk openly about the disease and acknowledge its personal impact.

Following a public meeting in every state and territory, over 300 women came together to discuss issues affecting women with breast cancer. An action plan was developed and the official launch of BCNA took place following this conference, at the inaugural Field of Women, a visual display of breast cancer statistics on the lawns of Parliament House in Canberra.

BCNA's vision is a better journey for all Australians affected by breast cancer.

BCNA's mission is to ensure that Australians affected by breast cancer receive the very best support, information, treatment and care appropriate to their individual needs.

- support: support and empower all Australians with a breast cancer diagnosis through services, resources and programs
- inform: develop and provide high quality information in a range of formats including information that can empower participation in decisions about treatment and care
- represent: advocate on behalf of Australians affected by or at risk of breast cancer and work to set the best possible treatment and care standards
- connect: strive to help Australians affected by breast cancer to feel less alone throughout their treatment and beyond. Connect people through their shared breast cancer experience to build support for individuals, groups and communities

Lyn retired as CEO of BCNA in November 2011. Maxine Morand served as CEO from November 2011 until December 2014. Christine Nolan retired after three years as CEO in February 2018. Kirsten Pilatti is currently CEO.

BCNA works cooperatively with the other national organizations including Cancer Australia, National Breast Cancer Foundation (NBCF), McGrath Foundation and BreastScreen Australia.

== Events and campaigns ==
Key BCNA fundraising initiatives include the Field of Women events held in 2005 (MCG), 2007 (SCG), 2010 (MCG), 2014 (MCG) and 2018 (MCG). At the 2018 event, the most recent, 15,000 people in pink ponchos formed the Pink Lady silhouette, bringing the national breast cancer statistics to life in a sparkling display of strength and support on BCNA's 20th anniversary.

The Field of Women events have now been adapted to be held in communities across Australia every year. These events are called Mini-Fields of Women. They centre around a visual display of 100 Pink Lady silhouettes planted in the ground or on display, and often include a simple ceremony. Personal messages are displayed on the silhouettes by family and friends.

In September 2010, AFL champion Shane Crawford embarked on a marathon walk from Adelaide to Melbourne, That's What I'm Walkin' About. Crawford's efforts raised $500,000 for BCNA and he continues to support the organisation. In 2013, Shane Crawford then raised more than $1.32 million for BCNA after riding 3,600 kilometres (2,200 mi) from Melbourne to Perth in 22 days on his marathon Tour de Crawf from 20 June to 11 July.

Key annual BCNA fundraising and awareness campaigns include Pink Sports Day and the Bakers Delight Pink Bun campaign. The Pink Bun campaign is an annual three week fundraising campaign which sees every Bakers Delight bakery around Australia donate 100% of the sale of their Pink Finger Buns and Paper Pink Lady cut outs to BCNA. In 2018, BCNA and Bakers Delight are celebrating 17 years of working together to support Australians affected by breast cancer. Over the past 17 years Bakers Delight has donated a total of $18 million worth of funds and pro-bono services to BCNA.

== Patron and board ==
Patron

- Her Excellency Ms Quentin Bryce AC, Governor-General of the Commonwealth of Australia

Board

- Kathryn Fagg, AO (chair)
- Prof. Jacinta Elston (deputy chair)
- Megan James (deputy chair)
- Lisa Montgomery, AIFS (deputy chair)
- Raelene Boyle, AM MBE
- Prof. Fran Boyle, AM
- Prof. Bruce Mann
- Clare Power

CEO

- Kirsten Pilatti

Founder

- Lyn Swinburne, AO (founder and former CEO)
