= Jim Mann =

Jim Mann may refer to:

- Jim Mann (baseball) (born 1974), American professional baseball pitcher
- Jim Mann (scientist) (born 1944), New Zealand nutritionist and endocrinologist

== See also ==
- James Mann
