= Frankie Mann =

Frankie Mann may refer to:

- Frankie Mann (composer)
- Frankie Mann (actress)
- Frankie Mann (jockey)

== See also ==
- Frank Mann (disambiguation)
