= William Mann =

William Mann may refer to:

- William Mann (astronomer) (1817–1873), English astronomer active in the Cape Colony
- William Mann (MP), English politician in the House of Commons, 1621–1625
- William Mann (settler) (1610–1650), original settler of Providence, Rhode Island
- William Abram Mann (1854–1934), general officer in the United States Army
- William d'Alton Mann (1839–1920), American Civil War soldier and newspaper and magazine publisher
- William C. Mann "Bill" (died 2004), American computational linguist
- William Mann (RAF officer) (1899–1966), senior Royal Air Force officer and flying ace
- Billy Mann (William H. Mann), record producer/singer/songwriter
- William Hodges Mann (1843–1927), American politician
- William Mann (cricketer) (1878–1938), English cricketer
- William J. Mann, American author and gay historian
- William Mann (Australian politician) (1875–1951), Australian politician
- William Julius Mann (1819–1892), American Lutheran theologian and author
- William M. Mann (1886–1960), entomologist and director of the National Zoo, Washington, D.C., 1925–1956
- William Mann (mathematician) (1920–2006), American mathematician
- William Mann (critic) (1924–1989), British music critic for The Times
- William Mann (rugby union), English international rugby union player
- Billy Mann (rugby union), Australian international rugby union player

== See also ==
- Mann (surname)
