= Maan =

Maan or Ma'an may refer to:

== Places ==
- Ma'an, a city in Jordan, and capital of the governorate
- Ma'an Governorate, a governorate of Jordan
- Ma'an, Syria, a village near Hama
- Maan, Punjab, a village Kasur District, Punjab, Pakistan
- Ma'an, Cameroon, a commune in Cameroon
- Man, Vikramgad, a village in Maharashtra, India
- Ma'an, Huitong County (马鞍镇), a town of Huitong County, Hunan, China

== People ==
- Maan (surname)
- Maan (singer) (born 1997), Dutch singer and actress

== Entertainment ==
- Maan (film), a 1954 Bollywood film
- Maan (Indian TV series), a 2001–2002 Indian soap opera television series that aired on Metro Gold
- Maan (Pakistani TV series), a 2015–2016 Pakistani television drama series that aired on Hum TV

== Other uses ==
- Maan family, a medieval Druze princely family
- Ma'an News Agency, a Palestinian news agency
- Arab Democratic Party (Israel)
- Mausoleum of António Agostinho Neto in Luanda, Angola

== See also ==
- Mann (disambiguation)
