= John Frederick Mann =

Australian surveyor (1819 – 1907)

John Frederick Mann (1819 – 7 September 1907) was an Australian surveyor, remembered for his accounts of Ludwig Leichhardt's second expedition.

== History ==
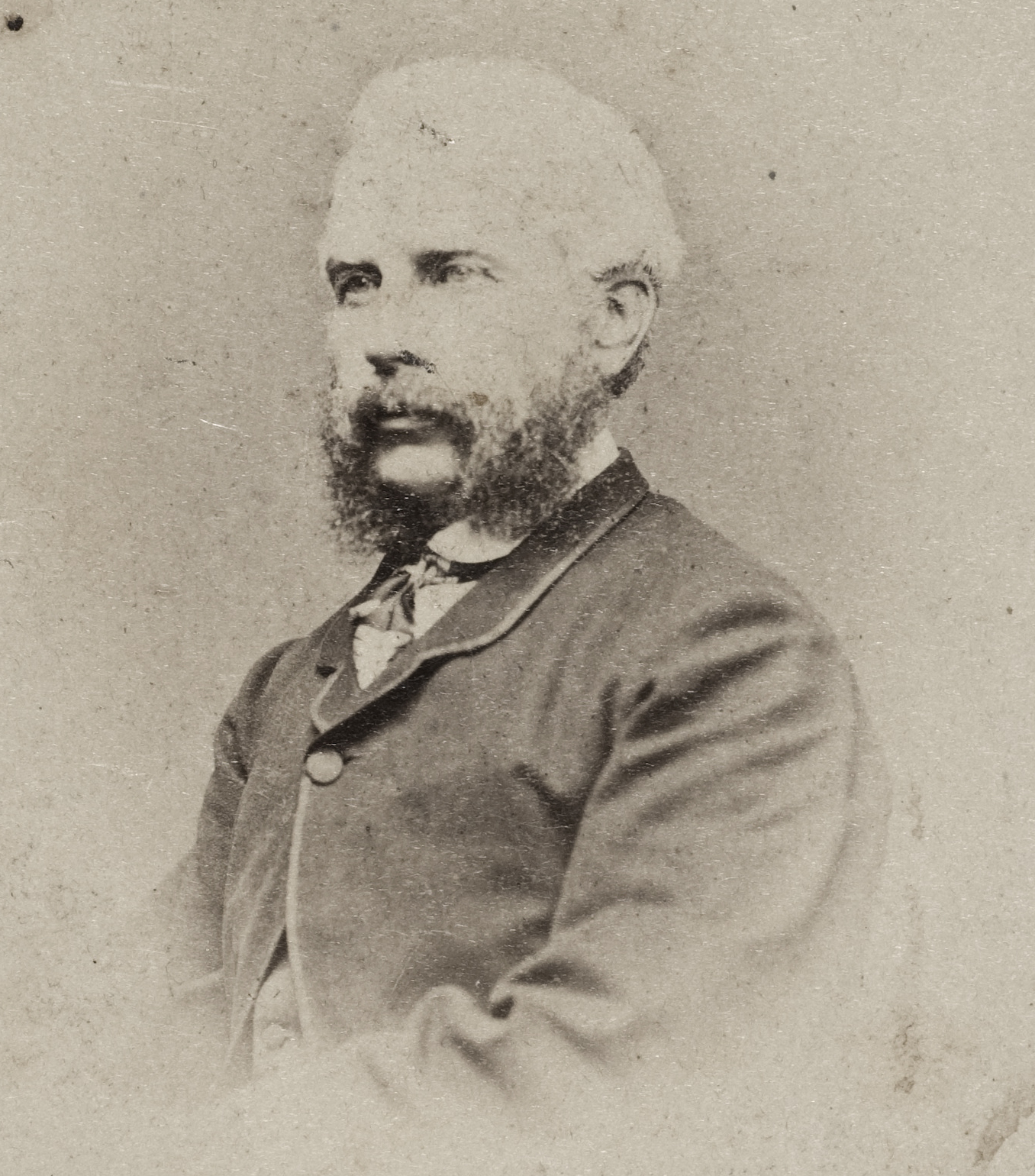
John F. Mann, Australian surveyor, ca. 1865-1870

Mann was born in Kent, England, the fourth son of Major-General Cornelius Mann, R.E., and grandson of General Gother Mann R.E. and General William Fryers R.E. He was educated at the Royal Military College, Sandhurst, England.

December 1846 – May 1847 he was second in command of Leichhardt's second expedition (Darling Downs to West Australia) in the party of nine: Leichhardt, Mann, James Perry (saddler), Heinrich Boecking (tanner and baker) (Note: According to one report, the only one from Leichhardt's earlier expedition. This has not been corroborated. That party consisted of Leichhardt, James Calvert (2-I-C), Charles Fisher and Harry Brown (Aboriginal aides), John Gilbert (ornithologist, speared to death; Calvert and Roper survived their wounds), John Roper, John Murphy (16yo), William Phillips (ex-convict), Christopher Pemberton Hodgson, and Caleb (African-American). Hodgson and Caleb left the party 3 November.) Henry Turnbull, Hovenden Hely, Daniel Bunce (botanist), and two Aboriginals: Harry Brown and Jemmy Wommai or Wamai. The expedition was abandoned at Peak Range (near present-day Emerald) after sickness overcame much of the party. Leichhardt blamed failure of that expedition on the "effeminacy" of his men. Mann responded to Leichhardt's allegations in a newspaper article 20 years later and a book (Note: Mann's Eight Months with Leichhardt may have been colored by (father-in-law) Mitchell's jealousy of Leichhardt's successful journey Moreton Bay to Port Essington.) after 40 years.

In 1848 he joined the NSW Survey Department, and surveyed a large portion of the State. He was an authority on matters relating to the early history the colony and the aboriginals.

He was for many years Hon. secretary to the Royal Geographical Society of Australasia.

== Family ==
On 16 April 1857 Mann married Camilla Victoria Mitchell, third daughter of Sir Thomas Livingstone Mitchell. They had a daughter Mary, who married William Welsh on 28 September 1872 and two sons: Livingston F. Mann, of the Lands Department and G. V. F. Mann, secretary to the National Art Gallery.

Mann died, aged 88 years, in Neutral Bay, Sydney.
