= Thomas Mann (disambiguation) =

Thomas Mann (1875–1955) was a German author, essayist, and Nobel Prize laureate.

Thomas Mann may also refer to:

- Thomas Mann (actor) (born 1991), American actor, Project X
- Thomas Mann (artist) (born 1947), American jewelry artist
- Thomas Mann (German politician) (born 1946), German politician (CDU) and Member of the European Parliament
- Thomas Mann (Iowa politician) (born 1949), American politician in the state of Iowa
- Thomas C. Mann (1912–1999), United States diplomat in Latin America
- Thomas E. Mann (born 1944), United States political scientist and author
- Thomas P. Mann (born 1965), Justice of the Supreme Court of Virginia
- Tom Mann (1856–1941), British trade unionist and socialist

== See also ==
- Thomann (retailer), a German-based retailer of musical instruments
