= Carr-Jeeves House =

Historic house in Massachusetts, United States

- U.S. National Register of Historic Places
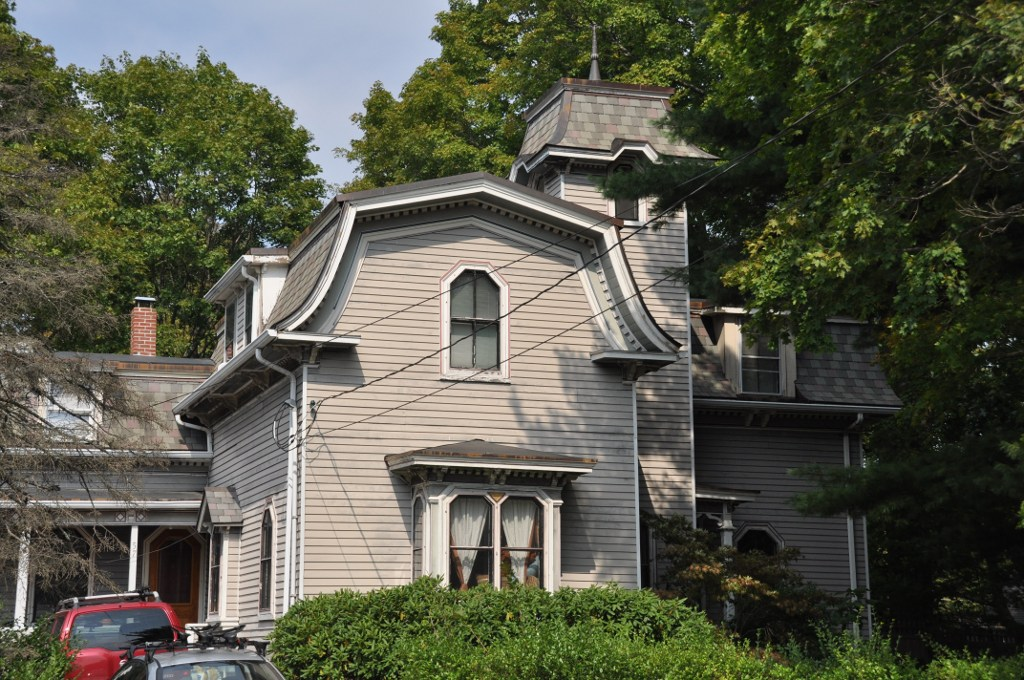

- Location within Massachusetts Location within the United States
- Location: 57 Lake St., Winchester, Massachusetts
- Coordinates: 42°27′23″N 71°8′30″W
- Area: less than one acre
- Built: 1869
- Architect: Moses Mann; James Mann
- Architectural style: Second Empire
- MPS: Winchester MRA
- NRHP reference No.: 89000639
- Added to NRHP: August 2, 1989

The Carr-Jeeves House is a historic house in Winchester, Massachusetts. Built in 1869, it is fine local example of Second Empire architecture. It was listed on the National Register of Historic Places in 1989.

== Description and history ==
The Carr-Jeeves House stands in a small residential area northwest of downtown Winchester, on the north side of Lake Street between Middlesex and Linden Streets. It is a 1 1/2-story wood-frame structure, with a mansard roof providing a full second story, and a clapboarded exterior. It has an L-shaped layout, with a gable end section facing the street, below which is a squared projecting bay. The windows on this facade are arched in polygonal fashion. The gables and eaves (including those on the roof of the projecting bay) have dentil moulding and brackets. There is a three-story turret in the crook of the L, also topped by a mansard roof.

The house was built in 1869 by Moses Mann and James Mann, local builders, as a speculative venture. Its design is apparently based on one published in a pattern book. It was sold to Mary Carr the following year, who sold it in 1878 to Thomas Jeeves. He added a carriage barn to the property (now subdivided and converted to a residence). This house is fairly typical of residential construction in Winchester from that period.

== See also ==
- James H. Mann House
- National Register of Historic Places listings in Winchester, Massachusetts
