= Manne =

Manne is a surname used in Dutch, Yiddish, and Telugu. Notable people with the surname include:

- Anne Manne, Australian journalist, wife of Robert Manne
- Criminal Manne, American rapper
- Henry Manne, American academic in the field of law and economics
- Kate Manne, American philosopher
- Mordechai Tzvi Manne (1859–1886), Hebrew poet
- Robert Manne (born 1947), Australian professor of politics at La Trobe University, Melbourne
- Shelly Manne (1920–1984), American jazz drummer

== See also ==
- Mann (disambiguation)
