= Charles Mann =

Charles Mann may refer to:

- Charles Mann (advocate-general) (1799–1860), British born administrator in South Australia (father of Charles Mann born 1838)
- Charles Mann (American football) (born 1961), American football player
- Charles Mann (Australian politician) (1838–1889), Attorney-General and Treasurer in South Australia
- Charles Mann (songwriter) (1949–1991), AKA "Charles M. Mann", American songwriter, soul singer and musician of the 1970s
- Charles Mann (singer) (born 1944), American singer from Louisiana, performer of the musical genre swamp pop
- Charles A. Mann (1803–1860), New York politician
- Charles C. Mann (born 1955), American author and journalist
- Charles C. Mann (politician) (1935–2024), American politician, member of the Georgia House of Representatives
- Charlie Mann (broadcaster) (born c. 1959), Scottish sports broadcaster
- Charlie Mann (actor) (born 2001), English actor
- USS Charles Mann, a United States Navy tug and patrol vessel in commission from 1917 to 1919
