= James Stuart MacDonald =

Australian artist and art critic

James MacDonald
- Born: James Stuart MacDonald; 28 March 1878; Carlton, Victoria
- Died: 12 November 1952 (aged 74); Melbourne, Victoria
- Education: Westminster School of Art; Académie Julian; Académie Colarossi
- Known for: Painter

James Stuart MacDonald (28 March 1878 – 12 November 1952) was an Australian artist, art critic and Director of the National Art Gallery of New South Wales from 1929 to 1937.

== Early life ==
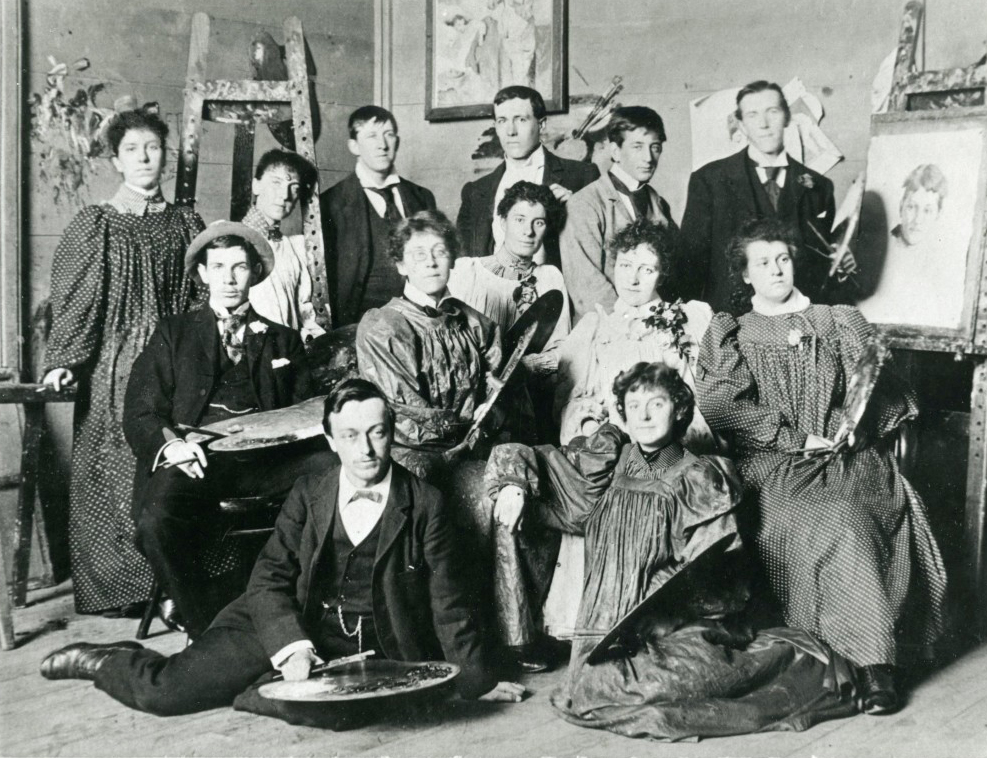
National Gallery of Victoria Art School, 1896. Back: Amy Mann, Agnes Kirkwood, Leon Pole, George Coates, Albert Ends, Hugh Ramsay Middle: James S. MacDonald, Dora Meeson, Jo Sweatman, Ada Coutie, Isabel Hunter Front: George Pontin, Portia Geach

MacDonald was born on 28 March 1878 in Carlton, Melbourne, the son of solicitor Hector MacDonald and his American wife Anna Louisa, née Flett. He attended Kew High School and Hawthorn Grammar School, but proved unsuccessful in his studies. As a child, MacDonald met many painters through family connections and, in the mid-1890s, studied at the National Gallery of Victoria's school.

MacDonald left Australia for London in 1898 to attend the Westminster School of Art. He then spent five years in Paris where he attended the Académie Julian and the Académie Colarossi. He exhibited his works in Paris at the Royal Academy of Arts and the Old Salon. He returned to Melbourne and married American arts student, Maud Keller, on 4 August 1904. They moved to New York where he taught art at a high school until 1910. Back in Australia he painted some portraits and landscapes, and turned to drawing in charcoal and to lithographic portraits.

On 9 September 1914, with the outbreak of the First World War, MacDonald enlisted in the 5th Battalion, Australian Imperial Force. With the rank of private, he served at Gallipoli where, on 26 April 1915, he was wounded in the abdomen and was classified unfit for active service. He served as a pay sergeant in England in 1916 and 1917. In 1918, he worked as a camouflage artist with the 5th Division in France and was medically discharged from the army in April 1919.

Returning to Australia, MacDonald took up art study, publishing works on Frederick McCubbin, Penleigh Boyd, David Davies and George Lambert. Having given up painting, from 1923 he was art critic for The Melbourne Herald.

== Gallery director ==
In October 1928, MacDonald was appointed as the director of the National Art Gallery of New South Wales. It was in that position that he gained a reputation for artistic conservatism and thus was in harmony with the gallery trustees. MacDonald held more exhibitions of Australian work than was customary and added workshops and storerooms to the gallery. In 1936, he applied successfully to become director of the National Gallery of Victoria. His relationship with the trustees became strained, particularly the chairman, Sir Keith Murdoch, who resented his ferocious attacks on contemporary art. In 1939, The Herald organised an exhibition of French and English painting, which MacDonald described as "exceedingly wretched paintings ... putrid meat ... the product of degenerates and perverts ... filth". In 1940, the trustees recommended against his reappointment and he was effectively dismissed in 1941.

In 1943, he was first witness on behalf of those who brought an action against the award of the Archibald Prize to William Dobell for his portrait of Joshua Smith. From 1943 to 1947, he was the art critic for The Age, and was appointed to the Commonwealth Art Advisory Board, becoming chairman from 1949 to 1952. Macdonald lived in Montrose and later joined the Liberal Party of Australia.

MacDonald died in Melbourne on 12 November 1952 and was cremated. In 1958, a collection of his writings, Australian Painting Desiderata, was published, with a foreword by Robert Menzies. His portrait, by Hugh Ramsay, is held by the University of Melbourne.

Cultural offices
Preceded by Gother Mann	Director and Secretary of the National Art Gallery of New South Wales; 1929–1937	Succeeded by Sir John Ashton
Preceded by P.M. Carew-Smyth	Director of the National Gallery of Victoria; 1936–1941	Succeeded by Daryl Lindsay
