= Jonathan Mann =

Jonathan Mann may refer to:

- Jonathan Mann (physician) (1947–1998), former head of the World Health Organization's global AIDS program, who is also the namesake of the WHO Jonathan Mann Award
- Jonathan Mann (journalist) (born 1960), journalist for CNN
- Jonathan Mann (musician) (born 1982), musician and YouTube personality

== See also ==
- John Mann (disambiguation)
- Mann (surname)
