= James Mann =

James Mann is the name of:

== Politicians ==
- James Mann (1822–1868), American legislator from Maine and U.S. Representative for Louisiana
- James Mann (Australian politician) (1892–1965), Australian state politician in Western Australia
- James Mann (South Carolina politician) (1920–2010), American soldier, lawyer and U.S. Representative from South Carolina
- James Mann, 5th Earl Cornwallis (1778–1852), British peer and Tory politician
- James Robert Mann (Illinois politician) (1856–1922), American legislator and U.S. Representative from Illinois

== Others ==
- James Mann (cricketer) (1903–1984), Australian cricketer
- James Mann (curator) (1897–1962), British collector, surveyor and historian of art
- James Mann (writer) (born 1946), American writer

== See also ==
- Jim Mann (baseball) (born 1974), American baseball player
- Jimmy Mann (disambiguation)
- James Man (1755–1823), businessman
- Mann (surname)
