= Justice Mann =

Justice Mann may refer to:

- Anthony Mann (judge) (born 1951), justice of the High Court of England and Wales from 2004 to 2021
- Frederick Mann (1869–1958), chief justice of the Australian state of Victoria
- Michael Mann (judge) (1930–1998), justice of the High Court of Justice of England from 1982 to 1988
- Thomas P. Mann (born 1965), justice of the Supreme Court of Virginia
