= Henry Man =

Henry Man may refer to:

- Henry Man (bishop) (died 1556), English bishop
- Henry Man (MP) (fl. 1415–1429), English politician, MP for Salisbury
- Henry Man (writer) (1747–1799), English author

== See also ==
- Henry Mann (disambiguation)
- Henry Manne (1928–2015), American writer and academic
