= George Mann =

George Mann may refer to:

- George Mann (footballer) (1873-unknown), see List of Manchester City F.C. players (25–99 appearances)
- George Mann (cricketer) (1917–2001), English cricketer
- George Mann (politician) (1918–1984), member of the Minnesota House of Representatives
- George Mann (rugby league) (born 1965), New Zealand-Tongan rugby league player
- George Mann (vaudeville performer) (1905–1977), half of the comedic dance team of Barto and Mann
- George Mann (writer) (born 1978), British author and editor
- Sir Anthony Mann (judge) (George Anthony Mann, born 1951), judge of the High Court of England and Wales
- George R. Mann (1856–1939), American architect
