= James Mann (cricketer) =

Australian cricketer

Personal information
- Full name: James Elliot Furneaux Mann
- Born: 2 December 1903; Melbourne, Victoria, Australia
- Died: 25 June 1984 (aged 80); Victoria, Australia
- Batting: Right-handed
- Relatives: Ian Mann (brother)

Domestic team information
- Years: Team
- 1924: Cambridge University

Career statistics
Competition	First-class
Matches	6
Runs scored	219
Batting average	24.33
100s/50s	1/–
Top score	114
Catches/stumpings	6/–
- Source: Cricinfo, 26 January 2022

James Elliot Furneaux Mann (2 December 1903 — 25 June 1984) was an Australian first-class cricketer.

Mann was born at Melbourne in December 1903. He was educated at Geelong Grammar School, before matriculating in 1923 to Corpus Christi College, Cambridge. While studying at Cambridge, he played first-class cricket for Cambridge University Cricket Club in 1925 and 1926, making four appearances. Playing in the Cambridge side as a middle order batsman, he scored 219 runs at an average of 24.33; he made one century, a score of 114 against Sussex at Hove. Mann later returned to Australia, where he died in June 1984. His brother, Ian, also played first-class cricket for Cambridge.
