= Bruce Mann =

Bruce Mann may refer to:

- Bruce Mann (civil servant), British civil servant
- Bruce Mann (oncologist), surgical oncologist
- Bruce Mann (rugby league) (1926–2007), rugby league footballer
- Bruce H. Mann (born 1950), Harvard Law School professor and legal historian

== See also ==
- Bruce Douglas-Mann (1927–2000), British politician
