= Joseph Mann (disambiguation) =

Joseph Mann may refer to:

- Joseph E. Mann (born 1955), American Congressman from Connecticut
- Joseph McElroy "Mac" Mann (1856-1919), first collegiate baseball player to throw a no-hitter and perfect the curveball

== See also ==
- Killing of Joseph Mann
- Joe Eugene Mann (1922-1944), American soldier
- Mann (surname)
