= Bakers Delight =

Australian bakery chain franchise

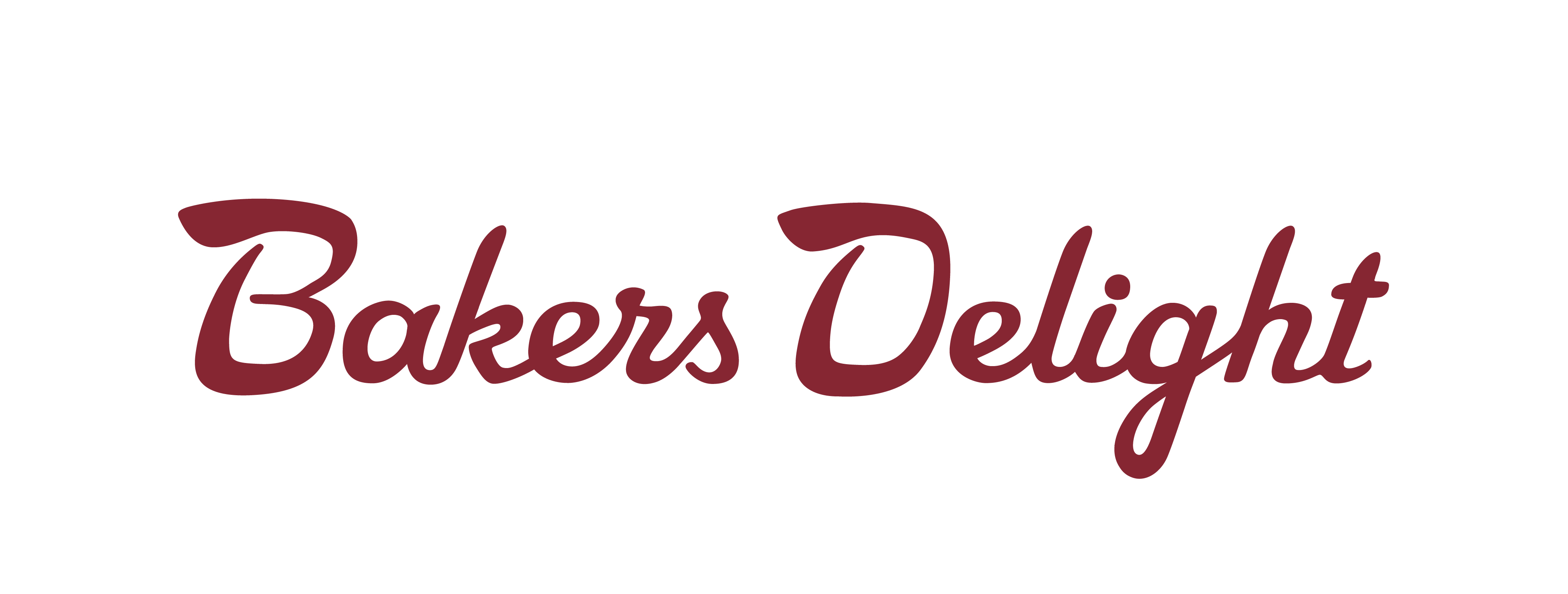

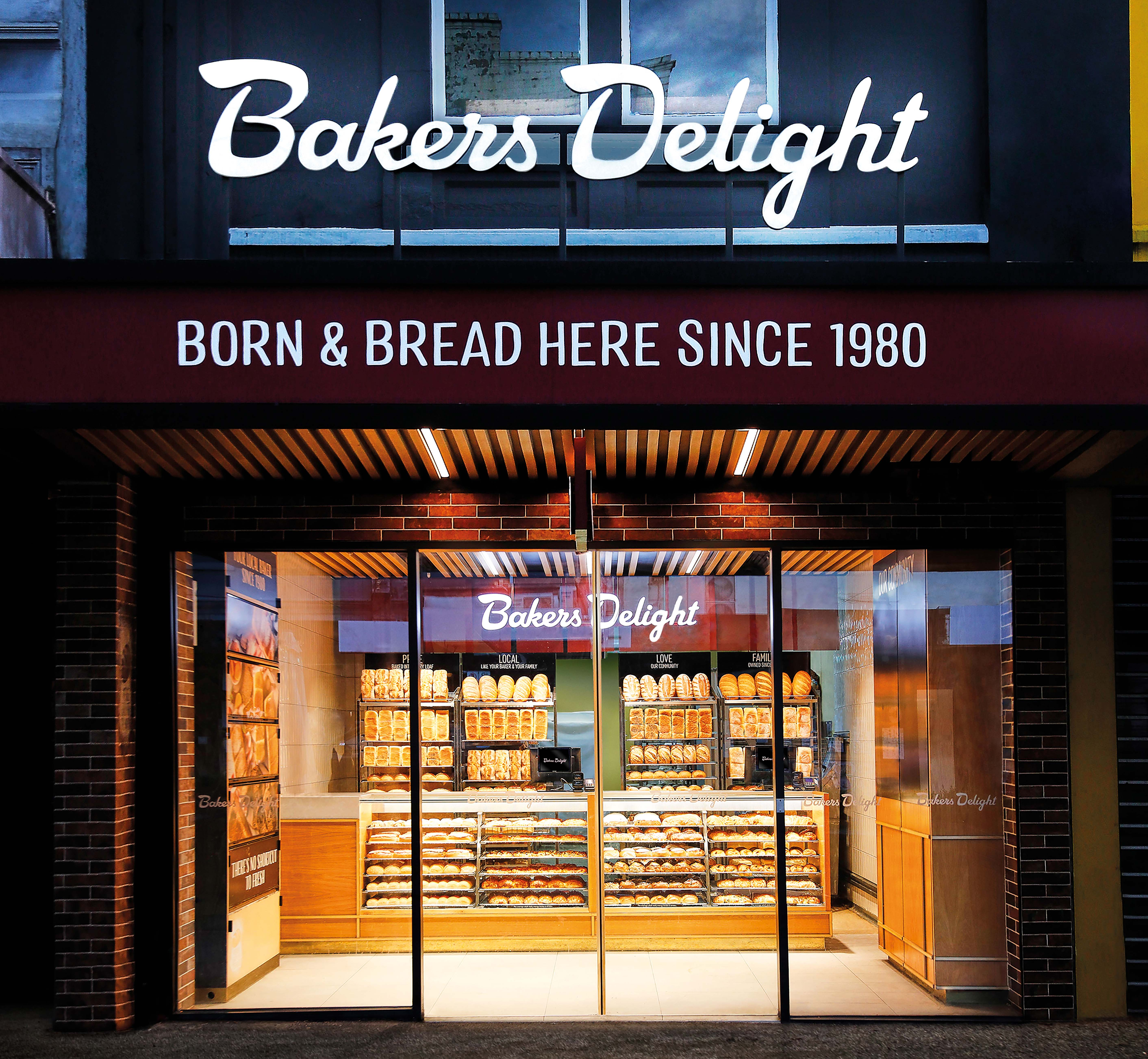
- Bakers Delight store in Hawthorn, Victoria
- Type: Franchise
- Industry: Bakery Franchising
- Founded: 1980; 46 years ago
- Founder: Roger Gillespie, Lesley Gillespie
- Headquarters: Camberwell, Victoria, Australia
- Number of locations: 700+
- Area served: Australia; New Zealand; Canada; United States
- Key people: Elise Gillespie, David Christie (joint CEOs)
- Products: Bread, pastries
- Website: bakersdelight.com.au cobsbread.com

Bakers Delight is an Australian-owned multinational bakery franchise chain, with franchisors in Australia, New Zealand, Canada and the United States. There are over 700 stores worldwide, with Australia having over 500 stores.

== History ==
Bakers Delight was established on 1 May 1980 by Roger and Lesley Gillespie. Lesley and Roger, a third-generation baker, opened a single bakery on Glenferrie Road in Hawthorn, Victoria.

In 1995, the franchise opened their first international bakery in Auckland, New Zealand. Today, there are 19 bakeries in New Zealand.

Bakers Delight entered the Canadian market in 2003, under the name COBS Bread, and now has over 140 bakeries in five provinces and five bakeries in the US.

In 2017, Roger and Lesley Gillespie took a step back from the business and appointed their daughter Elise Gillespie and her husband David Christie as joint CEOs.

Bakers Delight now operates over 700 bakeries globally.

== Community ==
Bakers Delight and Breast Cancer Network Australia (BCNA) began a long-term partnership in 2000. Since then, Bakers Delight has raised over $25 million for BCNA with their annual Pink Bun campaign that runs for three weeks in May.

== See also ==
- List of bakeries
- List of brand name breads
- List of restaurant chains in Australia
