= Jack Mann =

Jack Mann may refer to:

- Jack Mann (ice hockey) (1919–1980), ice hockey player
- Jack Mann (winemaker) (1906–1989), winemaker in Western Australia
- Jack Mann (rugby union) (born 1999), Scottish rugby player
- Jack Mann, pen name of E. C. Vivian (1882–1947), British editor and writer
