= Frank Mann =

Frank Mann may refer to:

- Frank Mann (cricketer) (1888–1964), English cricketer
- Frank Mann (engineer) (1908–1992), aeronautical and aerospace engineer
- Frank Mann (footballer) (1891–1966), English football player
- Frank E. Mann (1920–2007), American politician from the state of Virginia
- Franklin B. Mann (1941-2022), American politician
- Franklin Ware Mann (1856–1916), American inventor and ballistics scientist
