= Gottfried Mann =

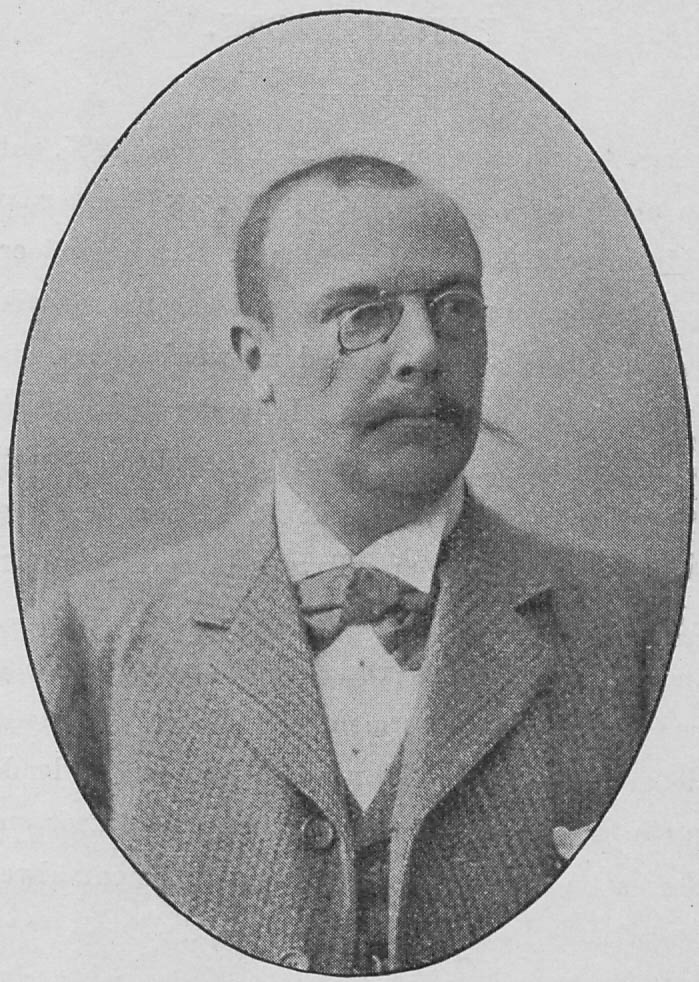
Gottfried Mann (ca. 1898)

Johann Gottfried (Godfried) Henrik Mann (The Hague, 15 July 1858 – Rosmalen, 10 February 1904) was a Dutch composer, conductor, and musician, who, despite being prodigious and producing over 100 opuses, is generally unknown.

He was first taught piano and theory by Emile Wagner, and then, after enrolling into the Royal Conservatory of The Hague, he began studying with Willem Nicolaï for composition, Carel Wirtz for piano, and "Mulder" for violin. (Note: He may be Karel Muldermans, composer and violinist (1832-1910).)

During his lifetime, his works were featured alongside well-known European composers like Antonín Dvořák and well-respected Dutch composers like Bernard Zweers and Alphons Diepenbrock. He also had interest in the public education of music and musical taste according to documented statements. Despite being a composer, he is best remembered as an orchestral conductor, recognized by musicologist Henri Anastase Viotta as such.

== Select works ==
Mann wrote for numerous genres, including concertos, sonatas, and small-ensemble and chamber works.

- 1875: Piano Quartet No. 1, Op. 26
- 1885: Clarinet Concerto, Op.90
  - Dedicated to Herrn Christian Kriens
- 1889: Andante, Op.94 (for cello and orchestra)
  - Dedicated to Leonidus Aaron van Praag
- Feest Praeludium, Op. 95
- 1896: 2 Chœurs (for 3 female voices/violin and piano)
  - Poetry of Théophile Gautier
- Troisième Suite, Op. 98
- 1901: Violin Concerto, Op.101
  - Dedicated to Czech violinist Karel Hoffmann
