= John Mann House =

Historic house in Wisconsin, United States

- U.S. National Register of Historic Places
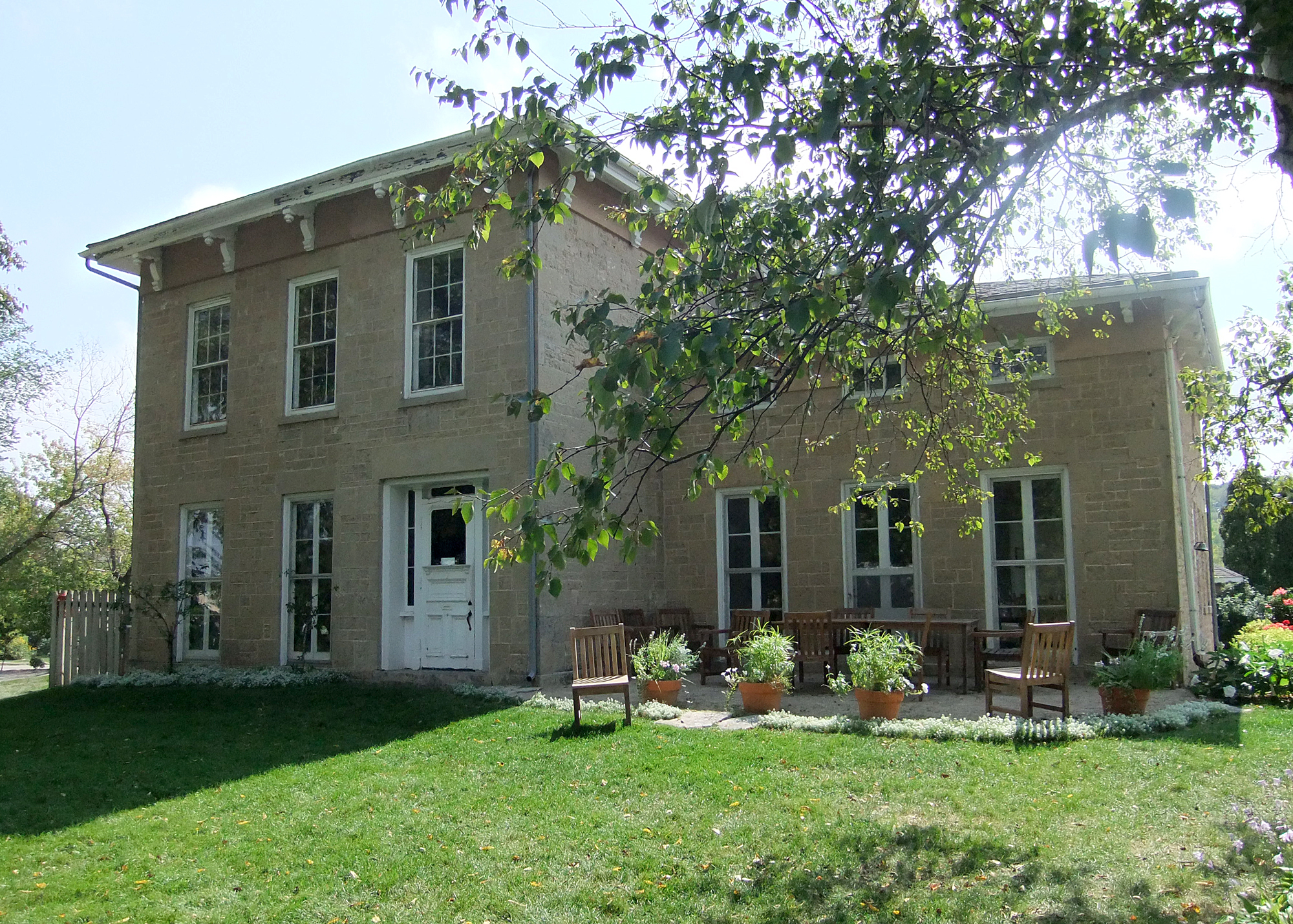

- Location within Wisconsin Location within the United States
- Location: 6261 Nesbitt Rd. Fitchburg, Wisconsin
- Coordinates: 43°0′33″N 89°28′43″W
- Built: 1856
- Architectural style: Greek Revival/Italianate
- NRHP reference No.: 82000655
- Added to NRHP: July 8, 1982

The John Mann House is an Italianate-styled farmhouse built in 1856 in Fitchburg, Wisconsin, United States. It was added to the National Register of Historic Places on July 8, 1982. Since 1980, the building has housed Quivey's Grove restaurant.

== History ==
In 1850 John Mann came west from New York state to run a livery service in Madison. After a few years he bought this farm in Fitchburg and had the house built along with a stone horse barn and two stone outhouses which still exist.

The main block of the house is a two-story cube with a hipped roof. The walls, 18 inches thick, are coursed sandstone blocks dug from a neighbor's quarry. The eaves are supported by scroll-shaped brackets. Windows are tall, with stone lintels. The front door is framed in a transom and sidelights. The adjoining secondary block is similar to the main block, but 1.5 stories tall. Inside are the original hemlock floors and maple banister and newel post.

The farm grew to 130 acres before Mann's son Edward sold the farm in 1876. It was in the J.P. Comstock family from 1886 to 1935. After that Dr. & Mrs. William Waskow lived in the house until 1980.

In 1980, the house was bought by Joe Garton and renovated by Arlan Kay of Oregon to become Quivey's Grove Restaurant.
