= James H. Mann House =

Historic house in Massachusetts, United States

- U.S. National Register of Historic Places
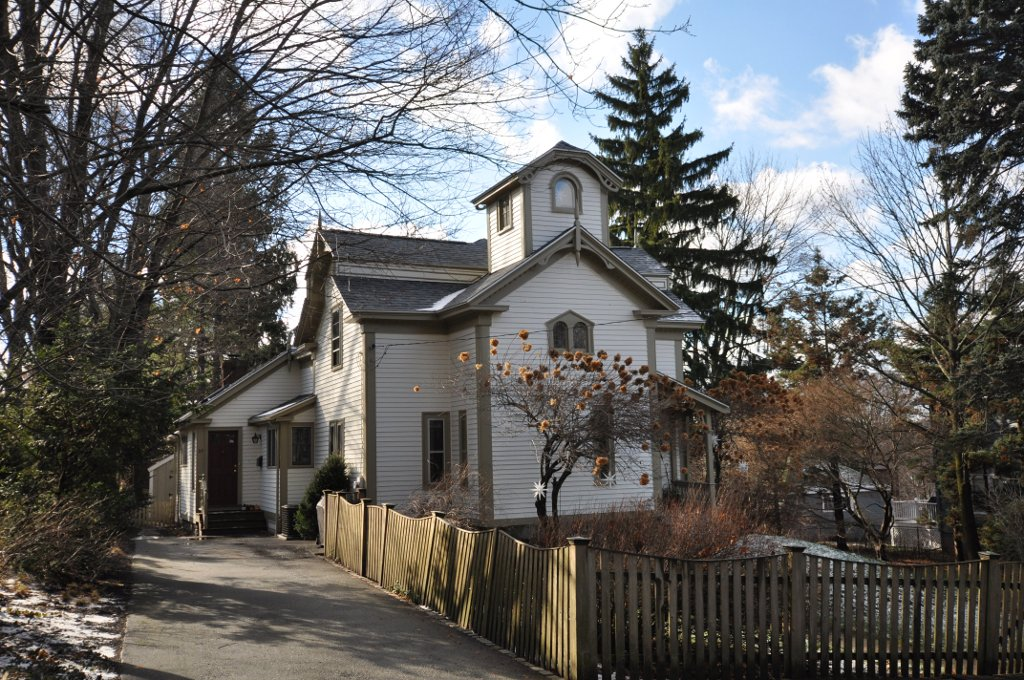

- Location within Massachusetts Location within the United States
- Location: Winchester, Massachusetts
- Coordinates: 42°27′24″N 71°7′44″W
- Architect: Mann, James H.
- Architectural style: Gothic Revival
- MPS: Winchester MRA
- NRHP reference No.: 89000624
- Added to NRHP: July 5, 1989

The James H. Mann House is a historic house at 23 Hancock Street in Winchester, Massachusetts. The 2 1/2-story wood-frame house was built by James H. Mann for his own use. Mann was a prominent local builder who also built the Carr-Jeeves House, another picturesque house with a mixture of architectural elements. This house is predominantly Gothic Revival in character, with its main body topped by a double roof roughly looking like a monitor. There is a three-story tower topped by a jerkin-headed roof, whose gable lines are decorated by Stick-style vergeboard.

The house was listed on the National Register of Historic Places in 1989.

== See also ==
- National Register of Historic Places listings in Winchester, Massachusetts
