= Henry P. Mann =

American politician (1858–1925)

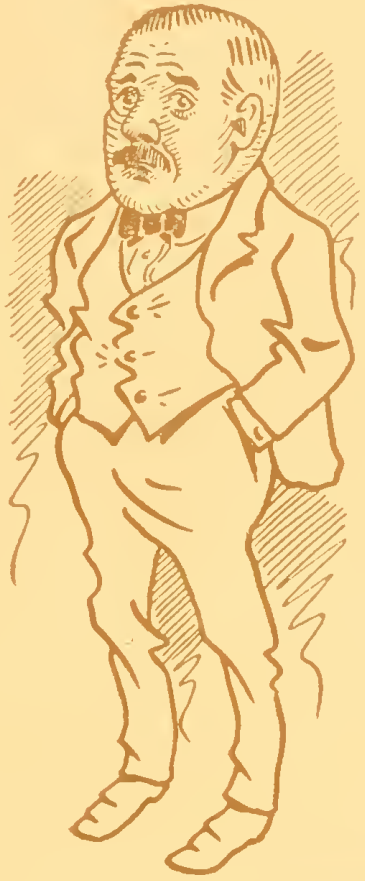
- Caricature of Mann in 1916 publication

Member of the Maryland House of Delegates from the Baltimore County district
- In office 1900–1901 Serving with Edward S. W. Choate, Joseph Jeffers, Joseph Sandman, Redmond C. Stewart, George W. Truitt

Personal details
- Born: 1858 Baltimore, Maryland, U.S.
- Died: March 30, 1925 (aged 66–67) Baltimore, Maryland, U.S.
- Resting place: Oaklawn Cemetery
- Party: Democratic
- Spouse: Helen E. Chester (died 1914)
- Children: 9
- Education: Knapp's Institute
- Occupation: Politician

Henry P. Mann (1858 – March 30, 1925) was an American politician from Maryland. He served as a member of the Maryland House of Delegates, representing Baltimore County, from 1900 to 1901.

== Early life ==
Henry P. Mann was born in 1858 in Baltimore. In 1867, Mann moved with his family to Orangeville. He was educated in public schools and Knapp's Institute.

== Career ==
Mann was a Democrat. He served as a member of the Maryland House of Delegates, representing Baltimore County, from 1900 to 1901. He then worked as chief of the fire alarm system in Baltimore County. Mann was elected county commissioner in 1903. He served five consecutive terms and served as president of the board for six years.

Mann was appointed as appraiser in the office of the Baltimore register of wills by mayor Howard W. Jackson. He ran a grain and feed business in Orangeville for 25 years.

== Personal life ==
Mann married Helen E. Chester. Mann had nine children, George S., Henry B., John M., Walter T., F. Talbott, Mary, Edith, Ruth and Myrtle. His wife died in 1914. Mann lived at 22 Hamilton Avenue in Baltimore.

Mann died on March 30, 1925, at his home in Baltimore. He was buried at Oaklawn Cemetery.
