= Gother Victor Fyers Mann =

Australian architect and painter (1863–1948)

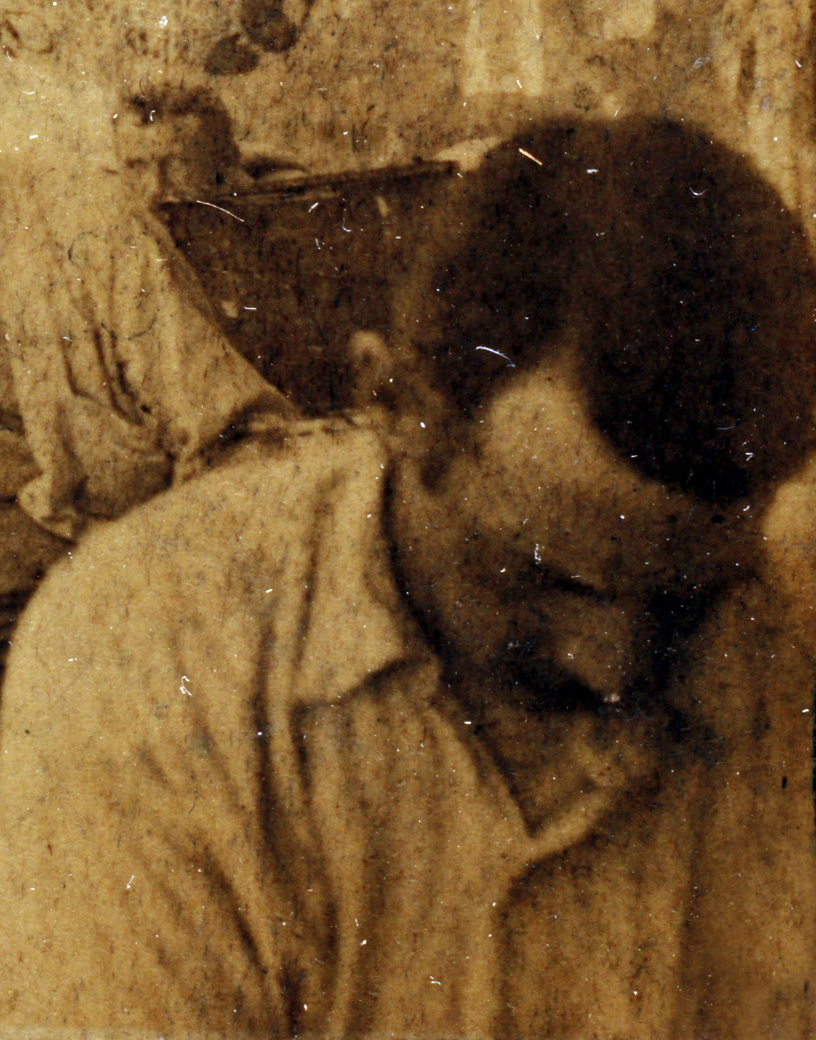
- Gother Victor Fyers Mann painting on board the 'Antidote' Hastings River [detail], 1896, vintage print, MIN 299
- Born: Gother Victor Fyers Mann; 8 October 1863; Sydney Australia
- Died: 12 November 1948; St Leonards, Sydney
- Known for: Architecture, painting
- Movement: Impressionism

Gother Victor Fyers Mann CBE (1863– 1948), also known as G. V. F. Mann, was an Australian architect, painter and Gallery Director.

== Life ==
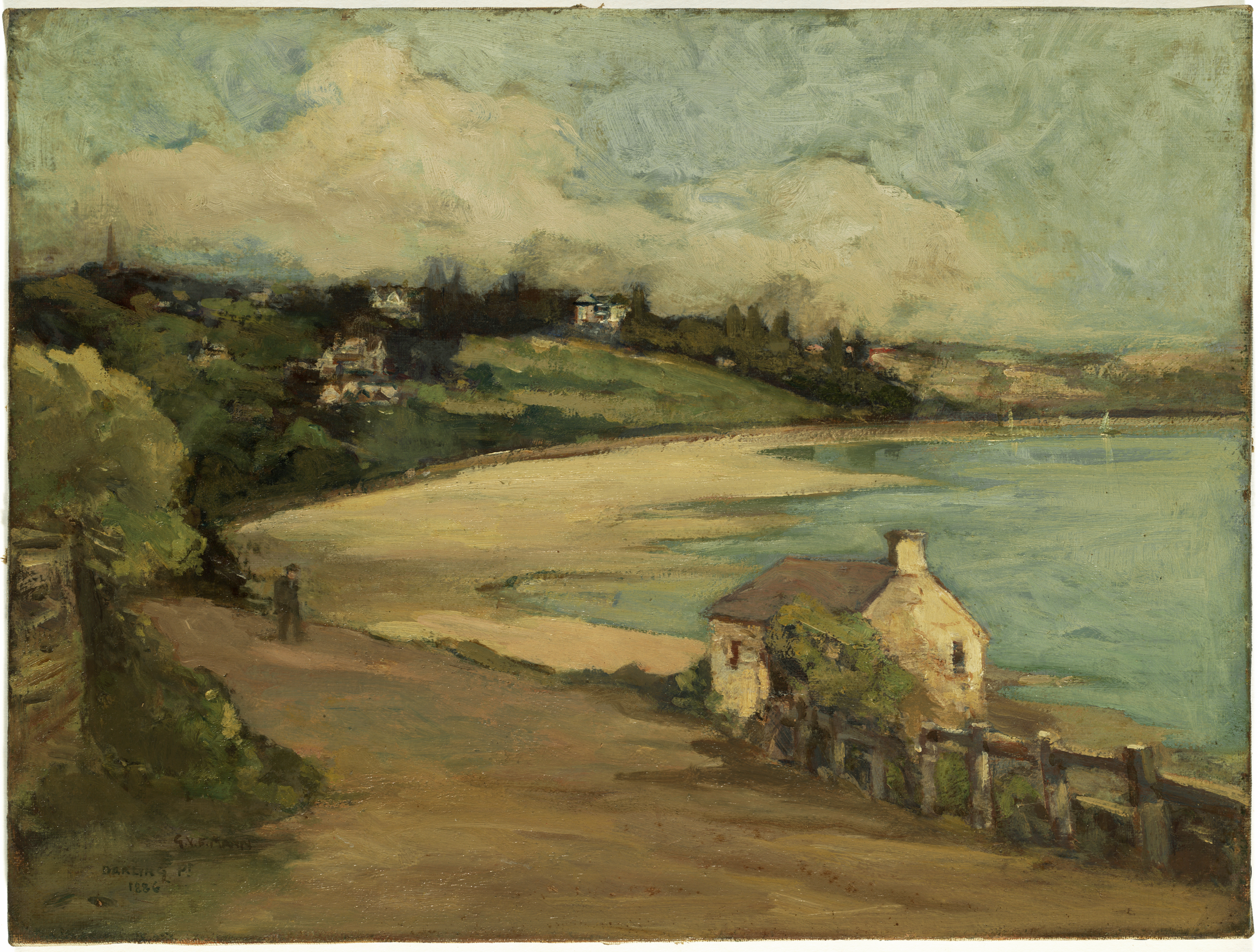
Darling Point, 1886, oil painting, Gother Victor Fyers Mann

Mann was born in Sydney on 8 October 1863. He was the fourth child of the surveyor John Frederick Mann and his wife Camilla Victoria, daughter of Sir Thomas Mitchell. He was apprenticed to the architect Thomas Rowe and elected an associate of the Institute of Architects of New South Wales in 1886. From 1888–1891 he practised in Brisbane in partnership with E. J. F. Crawford.

Mann was a keen painter and around 1885 attended classes under Julian Ashton. He continued to follow his architectural career when he returned to Sydney, setting up his practice in Bridge Street, but he continued to study art under Tom Roberts and Arthur Streeton. By the mid-1890s he was secretary of the Art Society of New South Wales and on 3 April 1902 he married Mabel Beatrice, daughter of photographer J. Hubert Newman. They lived at Neutral Bay.

In 1905, Mann was appointed secretary and superintendent of the National Art Gallery of New South Wales and from 1912 to 1928 was the Gallery's Director. He organized an important loan exhibition of Australian art in 1918 and visited Europe in 1914 and 1926 to buy for the collection. He was chairman of the Commonwealth Art Advisory Board from 1918–1948, established to advise the Historic Memorials Committee; which from 1914, at Mann's behest, began to acquire the nucleus of a national collection.

As a painter, Mann held his first and only one-man show at the Macquarie Galleries in May 1930. This retrospective exhibition included many scenes of Sydney Harbour and records of his visits abroad. Mann died on 12 November 1948 in Royal North Shore Hospital and was cremated with Anglican rites. His portrait by W. B. McInnes is in the Art Gallery of New South Wales.

On the 5 June 1930, he was formally invested with the insignia of Commander of the Civil Division of the Most Excellent Order of the British Empire.

== Exhibited work ==
- A Smart Breez, Gother Victor Fyers Mann, Agricultural Society of N.S.W. Exhibition, 1870.
- The Storm Wave off the Cape, Gother Victor Fyers Mann, Agricultural Society of N.S.W. Exhibition, 1870.
- A Tasmanian Pastoral, Gother Victor Fyers Mann, Annual exhibition of the Art Society of Tasmania, 1899.
- Deserted, Gother Victor Fyers Mann, Annual exhibition of the Art Society of Tasmania, 1899.
- Drying Sails, Gother Victor Fyers Mann, Annual exhibition of the Art Society of Tasmania, 1900.
- The English Mail, Gother Victor Fyers Mann, Annual exhibition of the Art Society of Tasmania, 1900.
- Winter Noon, Gother Victor Fyers Mann, Annual exhibition of the Art Society of Tasmania, 1900.

== Works held in collections ==
- Darling Point, 1886, oil painting, Gother Victor Fyers Mann, State Library of New South Wales, DG 246
- Old Sydney, sketches on the Rocks, 1900, watercolours, Gother Victor Fyers Mann, State Library of New South Wales, DG XV1A/1
- Park Hall, 1931, drawing, Gother Victor Fyers Mann, State Library of New South Wales, V1B/Doug P/1
- Carabella Cottage, 1931, drawing, Gother Victor Fyers Mann, State Library of New South Wales, V1A/N Syd/1
- Gother Victor Fyers Mann papers concerning the Mann and Mitchell families, 1846–1901, State Library of New South Wales, MLMSS 327

Cultural offices
Preceded by George Layton	Secretary and Superintendent of the National Art Gallery of New South Wales; 1905–1912	Succeeded by Himself as Director and Secretary
Preceded by Himself as Secretary and Superintendent	Director and Secretary of the National Art Gallery of New South Wales; 1912–1929	Succeeded by James MacDonald
