= John Mann (engineer) =

Guitar engineer

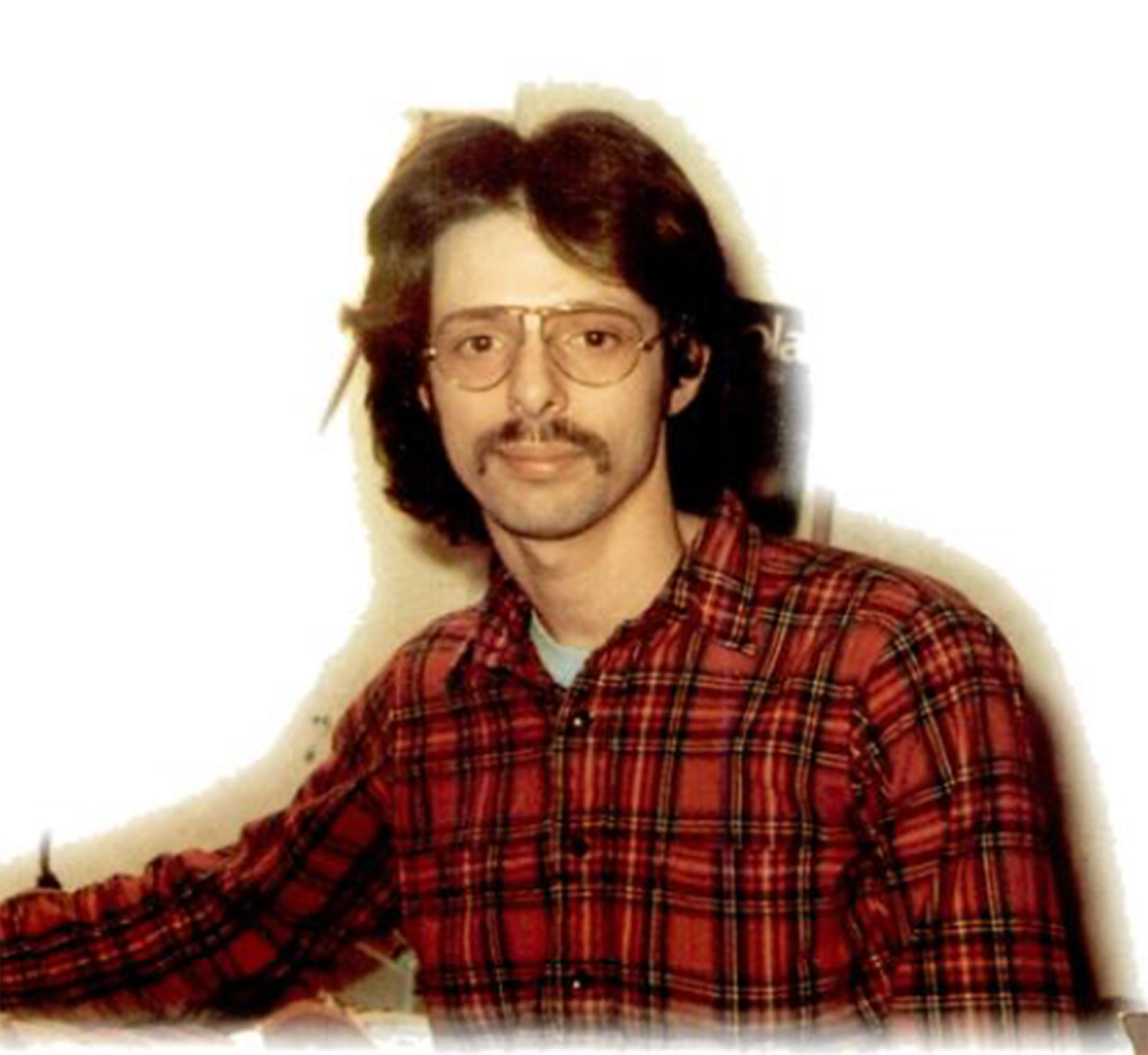
- Occupation: Engineer

John Mann is an American engineer known for his design of the PRS Vibrato/Tuning system. Today, PRS Guitars has grown into a very successful company endorsing many artists including Carlos Santana and John Mayer.

== History with Paul Reed Smith ==
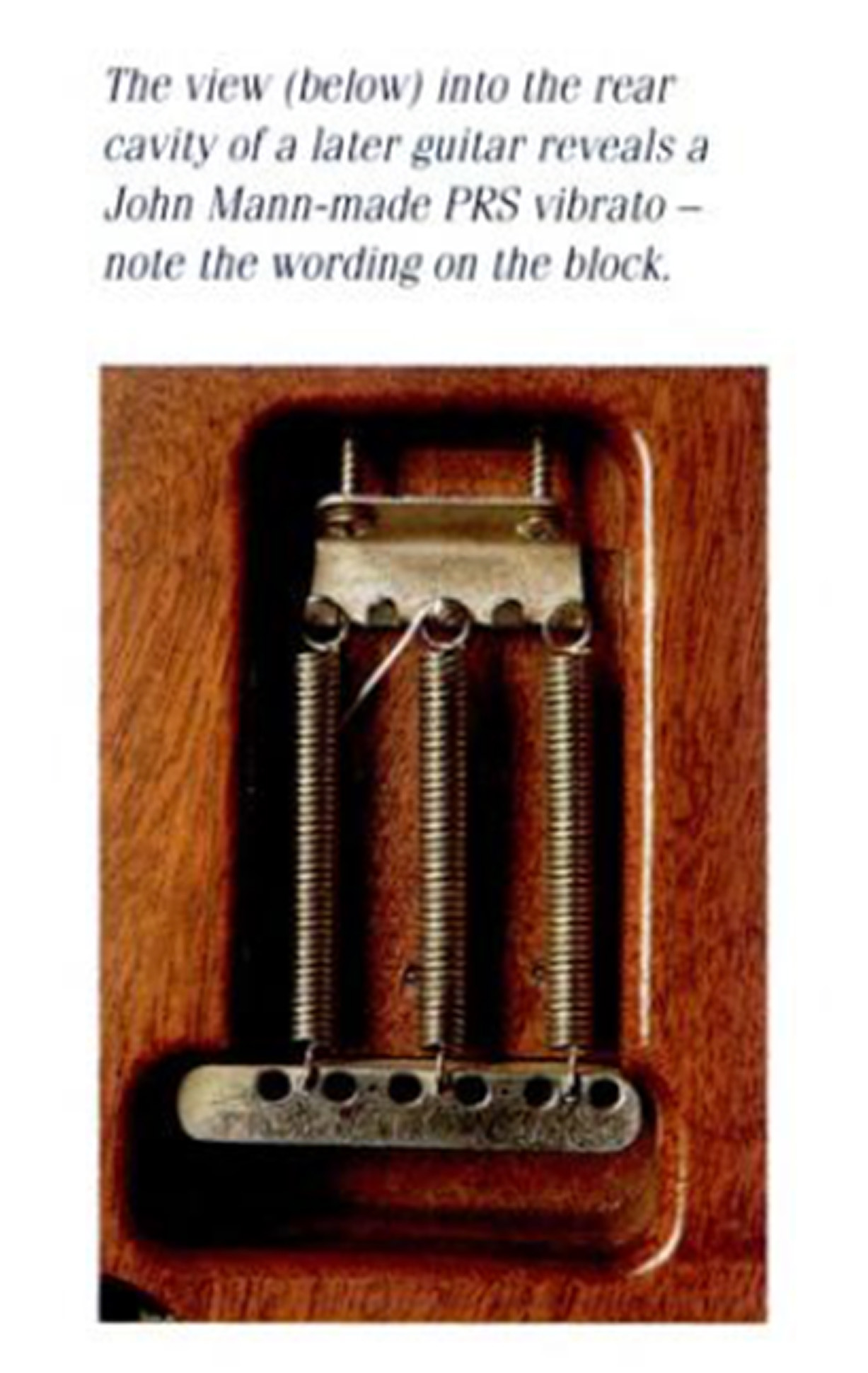
The look of a prototype PRS bridge setup from the back of the guitar

John Mann first met Paul in 1978 when he wanted to have a 1966 Gibson SG refinished. At that time, John worked at Westinghouse, Oceanic division, a large research and development engineering facility for the Navy on the outskirts of Annapolis, Maryland.

John Mann and Paul Reed Smith made history together when their PRS vibrato/tuning system received its U.S. patent. The two men have worked closely together since 1978, when they first met at Paul's one-man workshop on West Street, in Annapolis, Maryland.
