= Karl-Rüdiger Mann =

East German swimmer

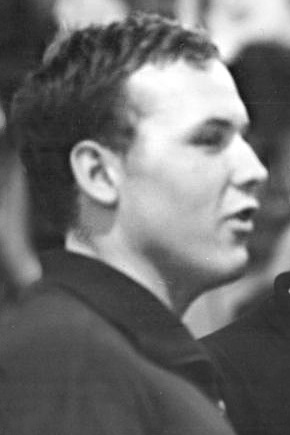
- Mann in 1971

Personal information
- Born: 24 March 1950 (age 76) Leipzig, Germany
- Height: 1.88 m (6 ft 2 in)
- Weight: 65 kg (143 lb)

Sport
- Sport: Swimming
- Club: SC Dynamo Berlin

Karl-Rüdiger Mann (born 24 March 1950) is a retired East German swimmer. In 1968 he won the national championships in the 1500 m freestyle event and was selected for the 1968 Summer Olympics, but failed to reach the finals.
