= Mann River =

Mann River may refer to:

- Mann River (New South Wales), a tributary of the Clarence River
- Mann River (Northern Territory), a tributary of the Liverpool River in central Arnhem Land, Australia
- Mann River (Maharashtra), India, a river in Buldhana district
