= Frank Mann (engineer) =

American aerospace engineer (1908–1992)

Frank Calvin Mann
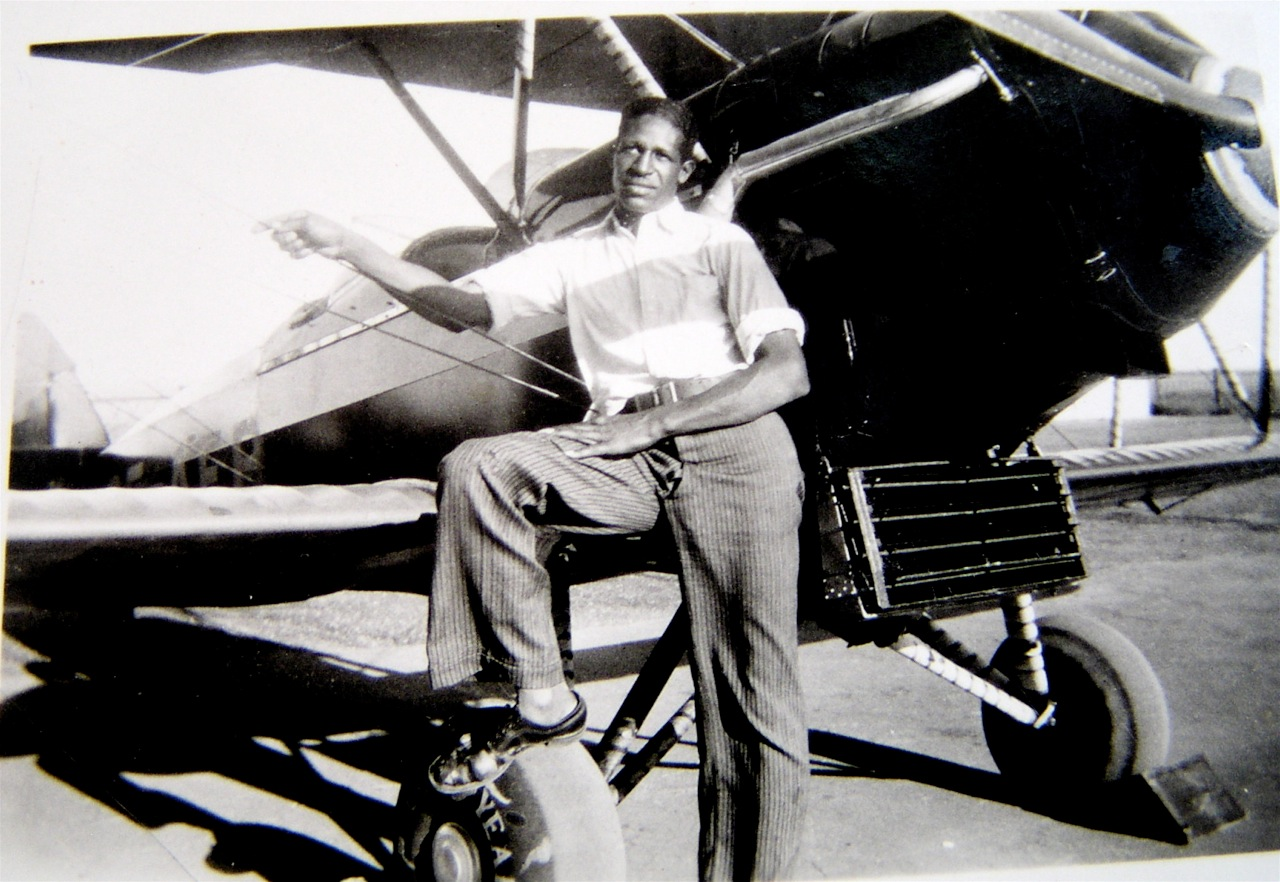
- Born: November 22, 1908; Houston, Texas
- Died: 1992 (aged 83–84)
- Education: University of Minnesota; UCLA
- Known for: Engineering
- Scientific career
- Fields: Aerospace engineering

Frank Calvin Mann (1908–1992) was an American engineer who was known for his participation in many of Howard Hughes's projects, including the Spruce Goose. He also starred in the Amos 'n' Andy radio show. Apparently, his lifelong friendship with Hughes was instrumental in opening doors for Mann's exceptional talents.

== Early life ==
Frank Mann was born in Houston, Texas on November 22, 1908 to parents who wanted him to be a school teacher. From childhood, Mann had a natural affinity for fixing things, and at age 11, he had his own mechanical shop. As a teenager, he worked alongside airplane mechanics, repairing engines. By the age of 20, he had designed and built several of his own Model-T cars. Mann attended the University of Minnesota and UCLA where he earned a mechanical engineering degree.

== World War II efforts ==
Mann was the primary civilian instructor of the Tuskegee Airmen in 1941 and served in the United States Army Air Corps. He left Tuskegee because they wanted to give the black pilots old World War I planes. Mann felt that they should be flying the same planes as their white counterparts, as they were just as qualified. The Tuskegee Airmen, known as the Red Tails, were an elite World War II escort unit hailed for the fact that they never lost a bomber they were escorting. Their participation was supported by First Lady Eleanor Roosevelt who was assured of their ability after riding with primary flight instructor C. Alfred "Chief" Anderson.

== Engineering ==
In a biography, Mann divulged, "I mostly worked on design plans for aircraft, and I redesigned components to make certain that the aircraft would work properly." He also was the first black pilot of a major airline, Northwest Airways. Mann was featured in the 1955 issue of Car Life magazine with a car - Baby Le Sabre - built as a hobby, modeled on the F-86 Sabre Jet. He received a decade's royalties on the LeSabre, Eldorado and other designs. In the 1950s, he built a 1.5" scale, live steam locomotive (currently enshrined in the Smithsonian Institution). Frank's second 1.5" scale live steam locomotive is a Texas (2-10-4) lettered as the Santa Fe 5001. It was sold to the owner of a private track near Comanche, Texas. The locomotive has been completely rebuilt, and now operates, and is housed at, the Comanche & Indian Gap Railroad. The reasoning behind the construction of the locomotive is due to the racism he experienced. He was denied entry into a live steam club until he built the largest locomotive in the state. The final product was the Santa Fe 5001.
