= John Mann (Australian cricketer) =

Australian cricketer

Personal information
- Born: 26 April 1919; Strathalbyn, South Australia
- Died: 24 September 1969 (aged 50); Lockleys, South Australia
- Source: Cricinfo, 19 August 2020

John Mann (26 April 1919 – 24 September 1969) was an Australian cricketer. He played in seven first-class matches for South Australia between 1945 and 1947.

== See also ==
- List of South Australian representative cricketers
