= Nancy Mann =

American statistician

Nancy Robbins Mann is an American statistician known for her research on quality management, reliability estimation, and the Weibull distribution.

== Education and career ==
Mann graduated from Chillicothe High School in Ohio in 1943. She earned bachelor's and master's degrees in mathematics at the University of California, Los Angeles (UCLA) in 1948 and 1949, and then worked as computing staff in the National Applied Mathematics Laboratories of the National Bureau of Standards.

She returned to UCLA and completed a Ph.D. in biostatistics there in 1965. Her doctoral dissertation was Point and Interval Estimates for Reliability Parameters when Failure Times Have the Two-parameter Weibull Distribution.

She later worked for Rocketdyne, and conducted seminars on quality control through her organization Quality Education Seminars.

== Books ==
With Ray E. Schafer and Nozer D. Singpurwalla, Mann wrote the book Methods for Statistical Analysis of Reliability and Life Data (Wiley, 1974). She is also the author of a book on the work of W. Edwards Deming, The Keys to Excellence: The Story of the Deming Philosophy (Prestwick Books, 1985, reprinted as The Keys to Excellence: The Deming Philosophy of Quality Management, Management Books, 2000).

== Recognition ==
Mann was elected as a Fellow of the American Statistical Association in 1970 "for her contributions to the theory of reliability, particularly for her research in the theory of point and interval estimation for the Weibull and extreme value distributions, and for her service to the profession as an Associate Editor of Technometrics".

She was selected to join the Chillicothe High School Distinguished Alumni Hall of Fame in 2003.
