= Attorney General Mann =

Attorney General Mann may refer to:

- Charles Mann (Australian politician) (1838–1889), Attorney-General of South Australia
- Gerald Mann (1907–1990), Attorney General of Texas
