= R.N. Mann House =

- R. N. Mann House
- U.S. National Register of Historic Places
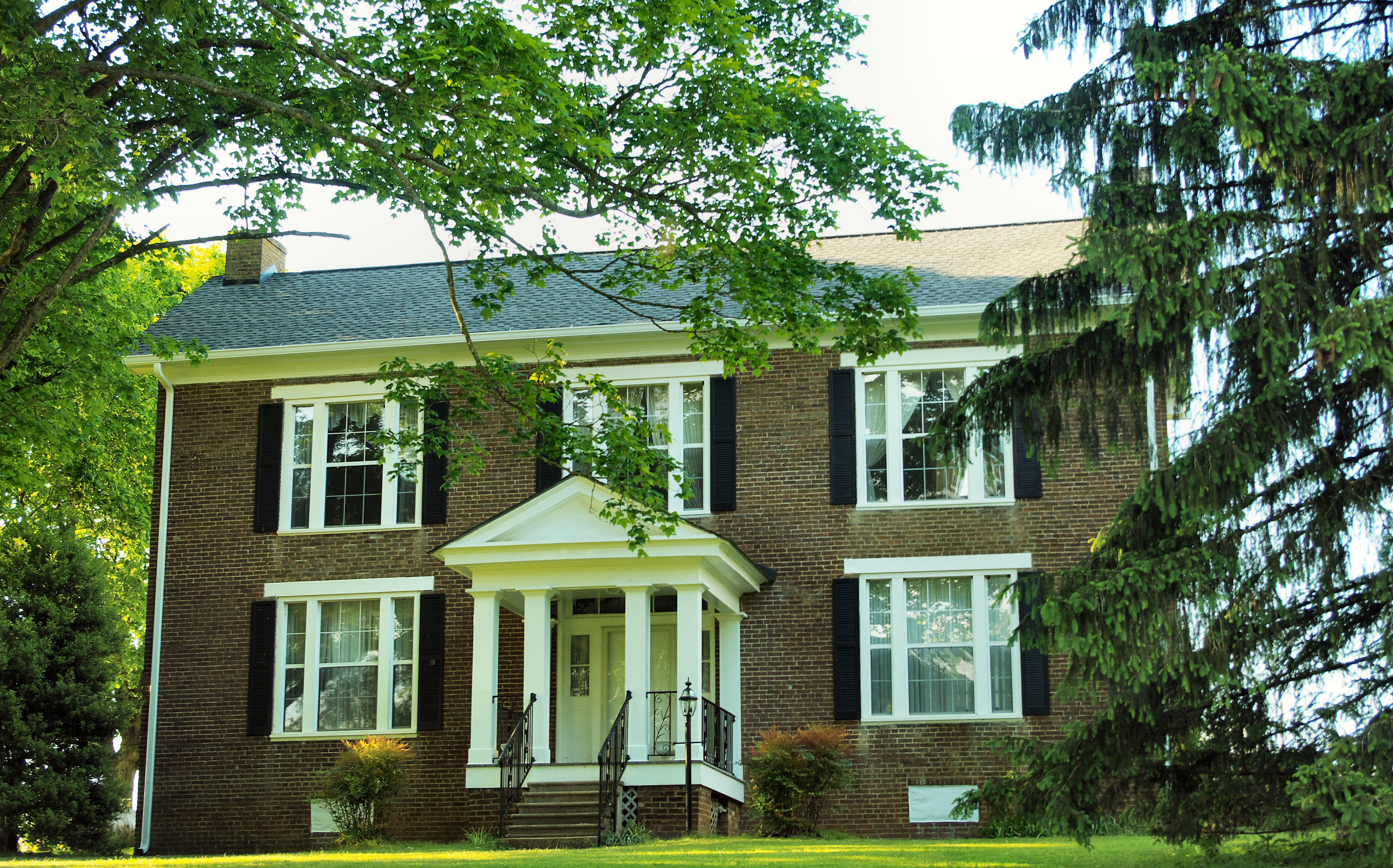
- The R.N. Mann House in 2015

- Location within Tennessee Location within the United States
- Nearest city: Huntland, Tennessee
- Coordinates: 35°06′03″N 86°15′25″W
- Area: 1 acre (0.40 ha)
- Built: 1855
- Built by: R.N. Mann
- NRHP reference No.: 77001271
- Added to NRHP: September 22, 1977

The R.N. Mann House, also known as the Painted Glass House, is a historic house in Franklin County, Tennessee, U.S.. It was built in 1855 for R.N. Mann, an investor in the Falls Mill Manufacturing Company, which operated cotton mills. It remained in the Mann family until 1917, when it was purchased by A. J. Cole.

It has been listed on the National Register of Historic Places since September 22, 1977.
