= Henry Man (writer) =

English writer

Henry Man (1747–1799) was an English writer.

Man was deputy-secretary of the South Sea House and colleague of Charles Lamb. He contributed essays to The Morning Chronicle; his works were collected, in 1802.
