= Ralph Sandiford Man =

American pioneer (1825–1906)

Ralph Sandiford Man (November 21, 1825 – November 15, 1906) was an American pioneer.

== Biography ==
Man was born in Charleston, South Carolina to John L. Man and Catherine Norton. Following a bricklaying apprenticeship with his father, Man travelled west, first to Georgia, then Louisiana and finally Harrison County, Texas where he met his future business partner Julian Feild.

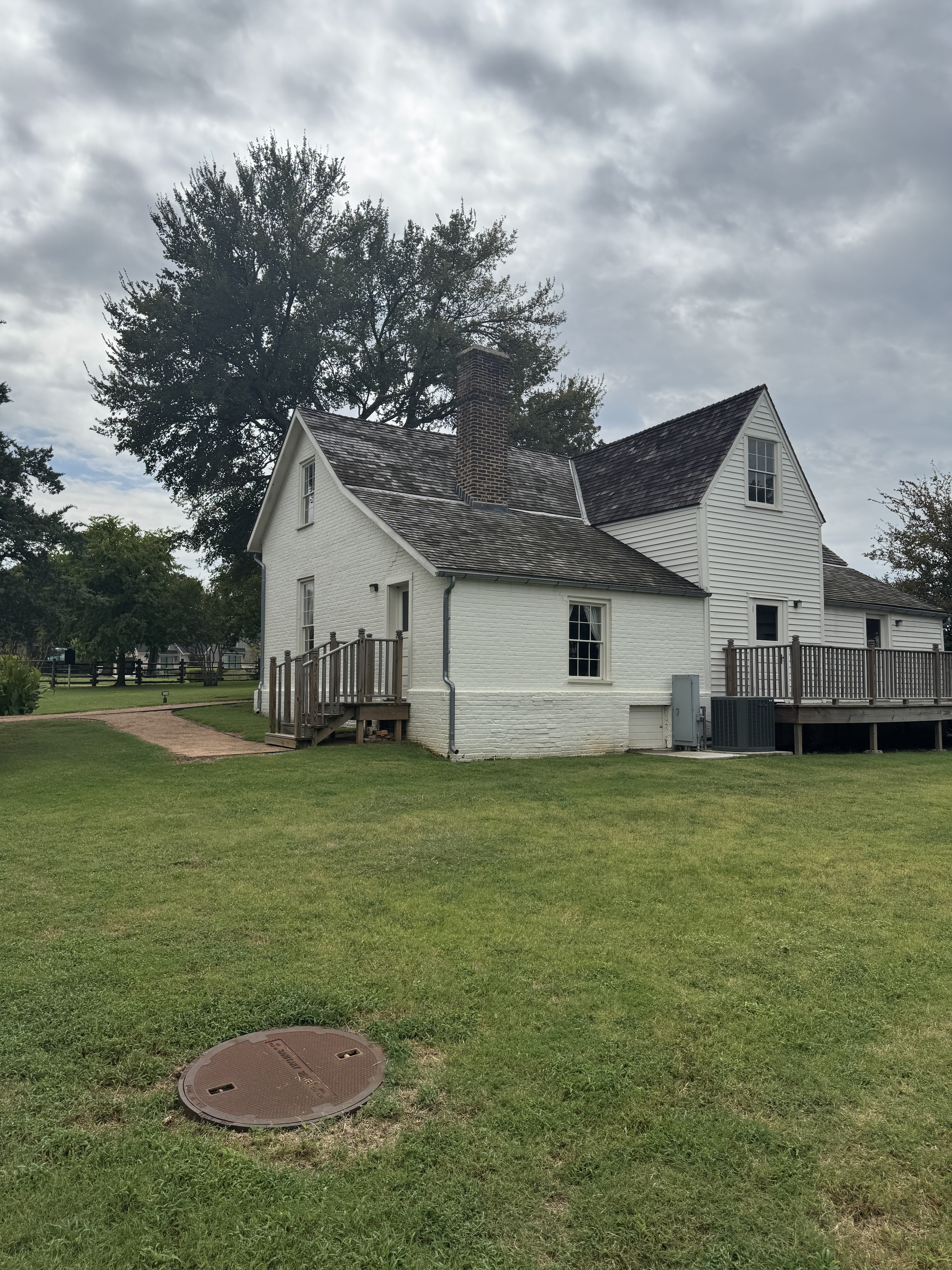
The Ralph Man Homestead

Together Man and Feild moved to Fort Worth c 1954, establishing on a Mill on the Clear Fork of the Trinity River to grind corn and wheat. Following a drought, the moved south to the Walnut Creek, building a mill in what would become Mansfield, Texas.

In 1864, Man married Julia Alice Boisseau, he sister of Feild's wife Henrietta, however she died in 1868 and he remarried to Sarah Jane Stephens.

Man remained active at his mill, and died on November 15, 1906, in Mansfield. His former homestead is now a museum, known as the "Ralph Man Homestead".
