= Henry F. Mann =

American businessman

Henry F. Mann was an American inventor and blacksmith. Mann is most famous for inventing a reaping machine in 1848 with his father Jacob J. Mann. Their first reaper patent was applied for on June 19, 1849. In 1861, Henry obtained a patent for improvement in breech loading cannons and subsequently test-fired many rounds for the chief ordnance constructor of the U.S. government.

This first reaper-harvester cut the grain with a scalloped edge sickle, and by a double series of toothed bands; one series running on a level with the cutting apparatus, and the other series, running up an inclined plane, carried the cut grain up the inclined plane by way of a revolving apron and deposited it into a rotating receptacle where the sheaf was collected, and thrown upon the ground in circular condition for binding. This was an improvement of earlier reapers where the operator did not have to rake or collect the grain into a sheaf. Ten of these machines were produced and sold in 1849. An improved machine was entered in the 1953 Indiana State Fair held at LaFayette. It won first premium in competition with the popular machines of that day. By the 1870s, around 2,000 reaper machines with the name "J.J.Mann and Sons" were being used.
