= David Mann =

David Mann may refer to:

== Entertainment ==
- David Mann (actor) (born 1966), American stage actor
- David Mann (artist) (1940–2004), American artist of the custom motorcycle subculture
- David Mann (songwriter) (1916–2002), American writer of popular songs
- David Mann (Duel), a character from the movie Duel, a film directed by Steven Spielberg

== Politics and government ==
- David E. Mann (1924–2018), U.S. Assistant Secretary of the Navy (Research, Engineering and Systems), 1977 to 1981
- David S. Mann (born 1939), Mayor of Cincinnati, Ohio and U.S. Representative

== Sports ==
- Dave Mann (archer) (born 1957), Canadian archer
- David Mann (cyclist) (born 1962), British racing cyclist
- Dave Mann (gridiron football) (1932–2012), NFL player from 1955 to 1957, CFL player 1958 and from 1960 to 1970
