= Charles C. Mann (politician) =

American politician (1935–2024)

Member of the Georgia House of Representatives from the 13th (post 3) district
- In office 1973–1983
- Preceded by: Jack A. Wheeler
- Succeeded by: abolished

Personal details
- Born: January 27, 1935 Lyons, Georgia, U.S.
- Died: December 27, 2024 (aged 89) Elberton, Georgia, U.S.
- Political party: Democratic

Charles Colquitt Mann (January 27, 1935 – December 27, 2024) was an American politician from the state of Georgia. He served as a Democratic member of the Georgia House of Representatives from 1973 to 1983.

== Electoral history ==
=== 1972 ===
==== Primary ====
Georgia House of Representatives, District 13, Post 3, 1972 primary election * denotes incumbent Source:
Party	Candidate	Votes	%
Democratic	Jack A. Wheeler	11,806	54.8
Democratic	Charles C. Mann	9,751	45.2
Total votes		21,557	100

=== 1974 ===
==== Primary ====
Georgia House of Representatives, District 13, Post 3, 1974 primary election * denotes incumbent Source:
Party	Candidate	Votes	%
Democratic	Jack A. Wheeler *	5,814	37.9
Democratic	Charles C. Mann	5,092	33.2
Democratic	Ray B. Burruss Jr.	4,453	29.0
Total votes		15,359	100
Runoff election
Democratic	Charles C. Mann	9,375	53.6
Democratic	Jack A. Wheeler *	8,115	46.4
Total votes		17,490	100

==== General election ====
Georgia House of Representatives, District 13, Post 3, 1974 general election * denotes incumbent Source:
Party	Candidate	Votes	%
Democratic	Charles C. Mann	10,794	75.9
Republican	Carl O. Martin	3,421	24.1
Write-in		7	0.0
Total votes		14,222	100

=== 1976 ===
==== Primary ====
Georgia House of Representatives, District 13, Post 3, 1976 primary election * denotes incumbent Source:
Party	Candidate	Votes	%
Democratic	Charles C. Mann *	20,120	100
Total votes		20,120	100

==== General election ====
Georgia House of Representatives, District 13, Post 3, 1976 general election * denotes incumbent Source:
Party	Candidate	Votes	%
Democratic	Charles C. Mann *	21,171	100
Write-in		3	0.0
Total votes		21,174	100

=== 1978 ===
==== Primary ====
Georgia House of Representatives, District 13, Post 3, 1978 primary election * denotes incumbent Source:
Party	Candidate	Votes	%
Democratic	Charles C. Mann *	9,749	66.4
Democratic	Charles W. Yeargin	4,943	33.6
Total votes		14,692	100

=== 1980 ===
==== Primary ====
Georgia House of Representatives, District 13, Post 3, 1980 primary election * denotes incumbent Source:
Party	Candidate	Votes	%
Democratic	Charles C. Mann *	20,592	100
Total votes		20,592	100

==== General election ====
Georgia House of Representatives, District 13, Post 3, 1976 general election * denotes incumbent Source:
Party	Candidate	Votes	%
Democratic	Charles C. Mann *	20,418	100
Write-in		1	0.0
Total votes		20,419	100

=== 1992 ===
==== Primary ====
Georgia Senate, District 47, 1992 primary election * denotes incumbent Source:
Party	Candidate	Votes	%
Democratic	Eddie Madden	10,664	35.2
Democratic	Charles C. Mann	8,817	29.1
Democratic	Joel B. Gunnells	7,521	24.8
Democratic	Wayne Phillips	3,291	10.9
Total votes		30,293	100
Runoff election
Democratic	Eddie Madden	12,270	55.8
Democratic	Charles C. Mann	9,714	44.2
Total votes		21,984	100
