= Jimmy Mann =

Jimmy Mann may refer to:

- Jimmy Mann (footballer) (1952–2026), English footballer
- Jimmy Mann (ice hockey) (born 1959), Canadian ice hockey player

== See also ==
- James Mann (disambiguation)
