= Maan (surname) =

' Maan is a surname. It is also used by the Jat people in the states of Punjab and Haryana.

== Notable people with the surname ==
- Amitoj Maan, Indian actor, director, author and screenwriter
- Amrit Maan, Indian singer-songwriter and actor
- Babbu Maan, Indian singer-songwriter, actor and producer
- Babu Singh Maan (born 1942), Indian musician and songwriter
- Baj Maan (born 2000), Canadian soccer player
- Bashir Maan (1926–2019), Pakistani-British politician, businessman and writer
- Behice Maan (1882–1969), Ottoman noble and twelfth wife of Sultan Abdul Hamid II
- Gurdas Maan (born 1957), Indian singer-songwriter, choreographer and actor
- Gurleen Maan, Canadian farmer and reality television participant
- Manjeet Maan, Indian film producer and director
- Nabyla Maan (born 1987), Moroccan singer-songwriter
- Saad Maan (born 1972), Iraqi politician and military officer
- Sandeep Singh Maan (born 1993), Indian Paralympic sprinter and long jumper
- Sharry Maan, Indian Singer and actor
- Sujeet Maan (born 1978), Indian wrestler
- Zora Singh Maan (born 1940), Indian politician

== See also ==
- Mann (surname)
