= William Mann (astronomer) =

English astronomer (1817 – 1873)

William Mann (1817–1873) was an English astronomer active at Royal Observatory, Cape of Good Hope, where he erected a new transit-circle in 1855 and made valuable observations.

== Life ==
William Mann was born at Lewisham in Kent on 25 October 1817. He was third son of Major-general Cornelius Mann, R.E., and grandson of Gother Mann, and accompanied his family to Gibraltar in 1830, on his father's appointment as commanding-royal engineer. In 1837 Admiral Shirreff procured him the post of second assistant at the Royal Observatory, Cape of Good Hope, and after due preparation he entered upon his duties in October 1839. For six years he was engaged chiefly on the remeasurement of Lacaille's arc, and sometimes passed three months without shelter even by night. His health, impaired by hardships, was recruited by a trip to England in 1846, and on his return in December 1847 he engaged, as first assistant, in the ordinary work of the observatory. His next voyage home was for the purpose of fetching the new transit-circle, erected by him at the Cape in 1855 with the aid of native labour. His observations of the great comet of December 1844, and of the transit of Mercury on 4 November 1868, were communicated to the Royal Astronomical Society, of which body he was elected a member on 10 March 1871. From a chest disorder, contracted through assiduity in cometary observations, he sought relief at Natal in 1866, in England in 1867, but was attacked in 1870 with debilitating effect by scarlet fever, of which two of his children had just died. He retired from the observatory, and died at Claremont, near Cape Town, on 30 April 1873.

=== Personal ===
He married in 1863 Caroline, second daughter of Sir Thomas Maclear. The value for three years of a small pension, granted to him from the civil list on the eve of his death, was paid to her by Gladstone's orders.

== Appraisal ==
According to Agnes Mary Clerke, writing in the Dictionary of National Biography, "Mann's character and abilities were superior to his opportunities. He was a good mathematician and mechanician". Mann's fellow-assistant, Professor Piazzi Smyth, once wrote of his "splendid intellectual parts and excellent dispositions".

== Bibliography ==
- Clerke, A. M.; McConnell, Anita (2004). "Mann, William (1817–1873), astronomer". Oxford Dictionary of National Biography (online ed.). Oxford University Press. (Subscription, Wikipedia Library access or UK public library membership required.)
- Warner, Brian (1979). Astronomers at the Royal Observatory, Cape of Good Hope: A History with Emphasis on the Nineteenth Century. University of Cape Town. pp. 55, 56, 58, 61, 62, 65, 66, 70, 74, 75, 127. ISBN 978-0-86961-109-8.
- "The foregoing observations were made by Mr. Mann". Monthly Notices of the Royal Astronomical Society. 6 (17): 254–5. June 1845. doi:10.1093/mnras/6.17.254.
- "The Volume of Memoirs will shortly appear". Monthly Notices of the Royal Astronomical Society. 26 (4): 102. February 1866.
- "William Mann". Monthly Notices of the Royal Astronomical Society. 34 (4): 144–8. February 1874. doi:10.1093/mnras/34.4.144.

Attribution:

- This article incorporates text from a publication now in the public domain: Clerke, Agnes Mary (1893). "Mann, William". In Lee, Sidney (ed.). Dictionary of National Biography. Vol. 36. London: Smith, Elder & Co. p. 46.
