= Medical Practitioners Board of Victoria =

The Victorian Board of the Medical Board of Australia is the state body for Victoria which has powers delegated to it by the Medical Board of Australia, the national body that regulates the medical profession in Australia. The operations of the Board are enabled by the Health Practitioner Regulation National Law (Vic) Act 2009, which also governs authorities for other health professions in Victoria. This Act replaced the Health Professions Registration Act 2005, under which the forerunner Board operated until 1 July 2007, and which was the successor to the Medical Practice Act 1994. The Victorian Board's delegated powers allow it to make individual practitioner registration and notification (complaints) decisions within the state, based on the national policies and standards set by the National Board.

The Board's duties, along with registering medical practitioners and medical students, include investigating notifications and complaints about medical practitioners. It includes monitoring the health and fitness to practise of doctors and students whose illnesses or conditions may affect their ability to safely practice. For serious matters, including professional misconduct, it conducts panel hearings and refers them to a tribunal for adjudication where necessary. The relevant tribunal in Victoria is the Victorian Civil and Administrative Tribunal, a statutory authority. The Board develops standards, codes and guidelines for the medical profession; assesses international medical graduates who wish to practise in Australia; and approves accreditation standards and accredited courses of study. It may also, on occasion, produce special reports for the Victorian Minister for Health.

In April 2007, the predecessor body, the Medical Practitioners Board of Victoria (MPBV), drafted guidelines aimed at stopping doctors exaggerating their expertise and also banning "before" and "after" photos in advertising to regulate the cosmetic surgery industry.

The Council of Australian Governments established the National Registration and Accreditation Scheme (NRAS) in 2010. From this time, the Victorian Board's forerunner, the MPBV, was incorporated into the national body. The nationally integrated regulation system is administered overall by the Australian Health Practitioner Regulation Agency (AHPRA).
