= Thomas Mann (artist) =

Thomas Robert Mann (born 1947) is an American jewelry artist known primarily for his metalsmithing and assemblage techniques. Combining industrial-style metals with found trinkets and baubles, Mann has dubbed his style "Techno-Romantic" and runs Studio I/O in New Orleans, Louisiana, where he now lives and works.

== Early life and education ==
Mann was born in Northampton, Pennsylvania and raised in Allentown, Pennsylvania. His father was a machinist for Bethlehem Steel, an influence to which Mann credits his "fondness for machinery." While in high school, Mann experimented with jewelry-making and worked at a silversmith shop in Allentown. The jewelry he sold during his teen years helped fund his education at East Stroudsburg University, where he earned a degree in performing arts in 1970. In 1977, Mann began exhibiting at the New Orleans Jazz & Heritage Festival and later established his home and studio in New Orleans in 1982.

== Selected collections ==
- Museum of Fine Arts, Houston
- Museum of Fine Arts, Boston
- Smithsonian American Art Museum
