= Mann, Central African Republic =

Mann
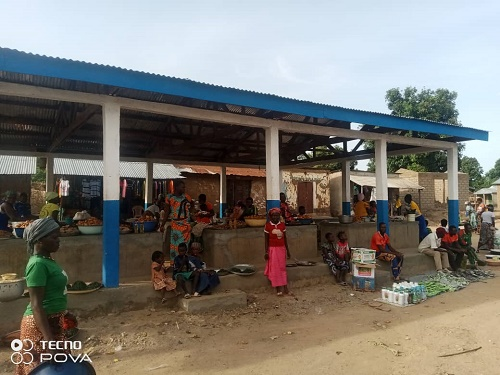
- Market in Mann

- Location in Central African Republic
- Coordinates: 7°22′31″N 15°29′8″E
- Country: Central African Republic
- Prefecture: Lim-Pendé
- Sub-prefecture: Kodi
- Commune: Kodi

Mann, also spelled Man, is a village situated in Lim-Pendé Prefecture, Central African Republic.

== History ==
A clash between APRD and FACA ensued in Mann in March 2008. An armed group attacked Mann on 14 September 2017, killing three people and raping three women. Moreover, they also looted houses. As a result, most of the women and children residents fled to the bush.

3R rebels attacked FACA position in Mann on 31 July 2021. Five soldiers were killed and some shops were damaged by the rebels. 3R visited the village on 14 September for several hours in which they looted the shops, causing all residents to flee to the bush or Cameroon. 3R captured Mann on 19 December after clashing with FACA. They later withdrew from the village and 24 government soldiers recaptured the village. Due to the attack, four civilians, one soldier, and one rebel were killed.

3R attacked Mann on 19 October 2022, and FACA repelled it. One civilian was killed and six injured, including two soldiers. The rebels burned dozens of houses. The villagers had fled to the bush before the attack after hearing the rumor of a rebel incursion into the village. 3R captured in Mann on 23 October after clashing with FACA that forced its soldiers to flee to Célé. Afterwards, the rebels torched down 100 houses and shops.

== Education ==
The village has two schools. MPC/RJ militias occupied the school in Mann on 22 September 2016.

== Healthcare ==
There is one health center in Mann, which was destroyed by the rebels.
