= Jack Mann (ice hockey) =

Canadian ice hockey player

- Born: July 27, 1919 Winnipeg, Manitoba, Canada
- Died: July 11, 1980 (aged 60)
- Height: 5 ft 7 in (170 cm)
- Weight: 180 lb (82 kg; 12 st 12 lb)
- Position: Centre
- Shot: Left
- Played for: New York Rangers
- Playing career: 1939–1948

John Edward Kingsley Mann (July 27, 1919 – July 11, 1980) was a Canadian professional ice hockey centre. He played nine games in the National Hockey League with the New York Rangers during the 1943–44 and 1944–45 seasons. The rest of his career, which lasted from 1939 to 1948, was spent in the minor leagues. Mann was born in Winnipeg, Manitoba.

== Career statistics ==
=== Regular season and playoffs ===
			Regular season					Playoffs
Season	Team	League	GP	G	A	Pts	PIM	GP	G	A	Pts	PIM
1937–38	Winnipeg Rangers	MJHL	9	0	1	1	6	2	0	0	0	0
1938–39	St. James Canadians	MJHL	17	7	7	14	10	2	0	3	3	2
1939–40	Nelson Maple Leafs	WKHL	27	20	9	29	21	7	7	2	9	6
1940–41	Nelson Maple Leafs	WKHL	27	30	15	45	30	2	2	1	3	2
1941–42	Nanaimo Clippers	PCHL	26	27	11	38	33	7	7	2	9	14
1942–43	Nanaimo Clippers	PCHL	19	16	12	28	8	3	1	0	1	0
1943–44	New York Rangers	NHL	3	0	0	0	0	—	—	—	—	—
1943–44	New York Rovers	EAHL	30	19	13	32	9	10	5	3	8	9
1943–44	Brooklyn Crescents	EAHL	2	0	0	0	5	—	—	—	—	—
1944–45	New York Rangers	NHL	6	3	4	7	0	—	—	—	—	—
1944–45	New York Rovers	EAHL	39	16	31	47	29	6	5	3	8	4
1944–45	Philadelphia Falcons	EAHL	2	1	0	1	0	—	—	—	—	—
1945–46	St. Paul Saints	USHL	36	12	11	23	6	6	0	4	4	0
1946–47	St. Paul Saints	USHL	6	1	2	3	0	—	—	—	—	—
1946–47	Fresno Falcons	PCHL	46	12	12	24	8	2	0	0	0	0
1947–48	New Westminster Royals	PCHL	56	18	34	52	16	—	—	—	—	—
PCHL totals			147	73	69	142	65	12	8	2	10	14
NHL totals			9	3	4	7	0	—	—	—	—	—
