= Ian Mann =

British space weather researcher

- Born: 6 June 1970 (age 56); UK

Academic background
- Education: BSc, Physics with Astrophysics, 1991, University of Birmingham; PhD, Applied Mathematics, 1995, University of St Andrews

Ian R. Mann FRSC (born 6 June 1970) is a British space weather researcher. He is a Full Professor of physics at the University of Alberta and former Canada Research Chair in Space Physics. In 2020, Mann was elected a Fellow of the Royal Society of Canada in recognition of how his "research has delivered transformative understanding of extreme space radiation and geospace dynamics."

== Early life and education ==
Mann was born on 6 June 1971. He completed his Bachelor of Science degree in physics from the University of Birmingham and his PhD in applied mathematics at the University of St Andrews.

== Career ==
Following his Ph.D., Mann worked at the University of York before accepting a position at the University of Alberta (U of A) in 2003. Upon joining U of A, Mann held the Canada Research Chair (CRC) in Space Physics until 2013. While serving in this role, he was named one of Canada's Top 40 Under 40. Mann also served as the principal investigator of the CARISMA magnetometer array and of the proposed space agency small satellite mission orbitals. He was also the co-investigator of NASA's Time History of Events and Macroscale Interactions during Substorms project (THEMIS). In 2011, Mann co-developed equipment for the Canadian Space Agency to help crews aboard the International Space Station monitor the radiation levels outside. Two years later, Mann collaborated with NASA researchers to identify the existence of a giant cosmic accelerator.

In 2020, Mann was elected a Fellow of the Royal Society of Canada in recognition of how his "research has delivered transformative understanding of extreme space radiation and geospace dynamics." Following this, he became the principal investigator on the RADiation Impacts on Climate and Atmospheric Loss Satellite (RADICALS) mission. The aim of the satellite mission was to assess the effects of space radiation on Earth's atmosphere in order to provide data for models of climate change.
