= Anthony Mann (judge) =

Retired British judge

Sir Anthony Mann
- Royal coat of arms of the United Kingdom

Justice of the High Court
- In office 2004–2021

Personal details
- Born: 21 May 1951 (age 75)
- Education: St Peter's College, Oxford

Sir George Anthony Mann (born 21 May 1951), is a retired judge of the High Court of England and Wales.

He was educated at The Perse School and St Peter's College, Oxford.

He was called to the bar at Lincoln's Inn in 1974 and became a bencher there in 2002. He was made a QC in 1992, recorder from 2002 to 2004, and judge of the High Court of Justice (Chancery Division) since 2004.
