= Gother Mann =

British military engineer (1747–1830)

General Gother Mann
- Coloured miniature of Mann, Practitioner Engineer and Ensign, 1763, aged 16
- Born: 21 December 1747; Plumstead, Kent, England
- Died: 27 March 1830 (aged 82); Lewisham, Kent, England
- Relatives: Gother Kerr Mann
- Military career
- Allegiance: United Kingdom
- Branch: Board of Ordnance
- Service years: 1763–1830
- Rank: General
- Service number: 165
- Unit: Corps of Royal Engineers
- Conflicts: American Revolutionary War; Invasion of Dominica (POW); War of the First Coalition; Siege of Valenciennes; Siege of Dunkirk; Battle of Hondschoote

Gother Mann (21 December 1747 – 27 March 1830) was an English army officer and military engineer in the Royal Engineers. He commanded a body of militia on Dominica when the island was captured by the French in September 1778, and his small garrison, outnumbered, surrendered on terms.

In 1781 he was employed in a tour of survey of the north-east coast of England. He was sent to North America as commanding engineer in the province of Quebec from 1785 to 1791, served under the Duke of York in Holland in 1793, and in 1794 went back to the Canadas, where he remained till 1804, when he went home to England.

He was made a colonel in 1797, colonel-commandant of his corps in 1805, lieutenant-general in 1810, and general in 1821. He was appointed inspector-general of fortifications in 1811, and held the office until death. Some of his plans for fortifying Canada are preserved in the British Library and Canada.

== Early years, 1747–1771 ==
Gother Mann, second son of Cornelius Mann and Elizabeth Gother, was born at Plumstead, Kent, on 21 December 1747. His father, a first cousin of Sir Horace Mann, went to the West Indies in 1760, and died at Saint Kitts on 9 December 1776. Gother was left under the charge of his uncle, Mr. Wilks of Faversham, Kent. After graduating from the Royal Military Academy, Woolwich, he obtained a commission as practitioner engineer and ensign in the Royal Engineers on 27 February 1763. He was employed in England on the defences of Sheerness and of the River Medway until 1775, having been promoted sub-engineer and lieutenant on 1 April 1771.

== West Indies, 1775–1777 ==
Towards the end of 1775 Mann was posted to Dominica in the West Indies and while there was promoted engineer extraordinary and captain lieutenant on 2 March 1777. In the morning of 7 September 1778, the French landed a strong force on the island, beginning a surprise invasion of Dominica. The British garrison, which was small, prepared for resistance, and Mann was named to command a detachment of the militia stationed at the new battery at Guey's Hill (now called King's Hill), which he prepared to defend. The council of the island pressured Lieutenant-governor William Stuart to capitulate; he yielded, and the island was surrendered without an effort being made to retain it.

== England, 1778–1781 ==
Mann made a report to the Board of Ordnance dated 14 September 1778, giving full details of the attack. He was only detained for a few months as a prisoner of war, and on 19 August 1779 he was appointed to the engineer staff of Great Britain, and reported on the defences of the east coast of England. He was stationed at Chatham under Colonel Hugh Debbeig. In 1781 he was selected by Lord Amherst and Sir Charles Frederick to accompany Colonel Braham, the chief engineer, on a tour of survey of the north-east coast of England, to consider what defences were desirable, as seven corporations had submitted petitions on the subject.

== Quebec, 1785–1790 ==
In 1785 Mann, age thirty-eight, was sent to the Province of Quebec as commanding engineer, succeeding William Twiss, and accompanied by fellow engineer Ralph Henry Bruyeres. Promoted captain on 16 September 1785, he was employed in every part of the country in both civil and military duties, erecting fortifications, improving ports, and laying out townships, such as Toronto and Sorel. In 1788 the governor, Guy Carleton, Lord Dorchester, had him make an extensive examination of military posts, harbours and navigable waterways from Kingston to St. Marys River, Sault Ste. Marie, in which Mann laments the ruination and ill placement of the bases: many of which were on the United States' side of the border established by the Treaty of Paris in 1783, though the British did not quit them till two years after the signing of the Jay Treaty in 1794.

== Holland, 1793 ==
Mann returned to England in 1791. He went to the Netherlands in 1792, and, joining the British army under Prince Frederick, Duke of York in June 1793, took part in the Flanders campaign. He was present at the siege of Valenciennes, which capitulated to the Coalition forces on 28 July, at the siege of Dunkirk from 24 August to 9 September, and at the battle of Hondschoote or Menin from 12 to 15 September. He was promoted lieutenant-colonel on 5 December 1793.

== Lower Canada, 1794–1804 ==
On his return to England in April 1794 Mann was briefly employed under the master-general of the ordnance in London, before being sent back to Lower Canada, as commanding engineer, to prepare defences at Quebec, since invasion from the United States then seemed a possibility. He became colonel in the Army on 26 January 1797, and colonel in the Royal Engineers on 18 August the same year. He wrote several reports in favour of establishing new and permanent defence systems at Quebec, and building more fortifications. In 1800 he made a report on the St. Lawrence River canals and pointed out needed repairs and proposed certain improvements to the locks. He became major-general on 25 September 1803. In the same year he received permission to return to England where his wife and children had remained, and he embarked in the spring of 1804.

== Later years, 1805–1830 ==
From 1805 until 1811 Mann was employed either on particular service in Ireland or on various committees in London. On 13 July 1805 he was made a colonel-commandant of the Corps of Royal Engineers, on 25 July 1810 lieutenant-general, and on 19 July 1821 general. On 23 July 1811 he succeeded General Robert Morse as inspector-general of fortifications, an office he held until his death, and in that capacity he continued to write on Canadian defences, such as the construction of the Citadelle of Quebec. He was appointed president of the committee to examine cadets for commissions on 19 May 1828.

Gother Mann was the senior officer in the engineers when he died, at age eighty-two, on 27 March 1830. He was buried in Plumstead churchyard, where a tombstone was erected to his memory.

His services in Canada were rewarded by a grant, on 22 July 1805, of 22,859 acres (9,251 hectares) of land in the township of Acton in Lower Canada. He also received while holding the office of inspector-general of fortifications the offer of a baronetcy, which, for financial considerations, he declined.

== Marriage and issue ==
On 1 March 1768, at St. Nicholas's, Rochester, Kent, Ensign Gother Mann married Ann, second daughter of Peter Wade of Rushford Manor, Eythorne, Kent, rector of Cooling, vicar of Boughton Monchelsea, and minor canon of Rochester Cathedral. By her he had five sons and three daughters. Of the sons, Gother was in the Royal Artillery, Cornelius in the Royal Engineers, John in the 28th Regiment of Foot, and Frederick William in the Royal Marines, and afterwards in the Royal Staff Corps. William, son of Cornelius, was an astronomer.

== Likenesses ==
Three coloured miniatures of Mann came into the possession of his descendants. One, taken when he had just entered the Corps of Royal Engineers in 1763, was once owned by his grandson, Major-general James Robert Mann, C.M.G., Royal Engineers, son of Major-general Cornelius Mann, Royal Engineers. This is reproduced in Porter's History of the Corps of Royal Engineers, 1889.

== Works ==
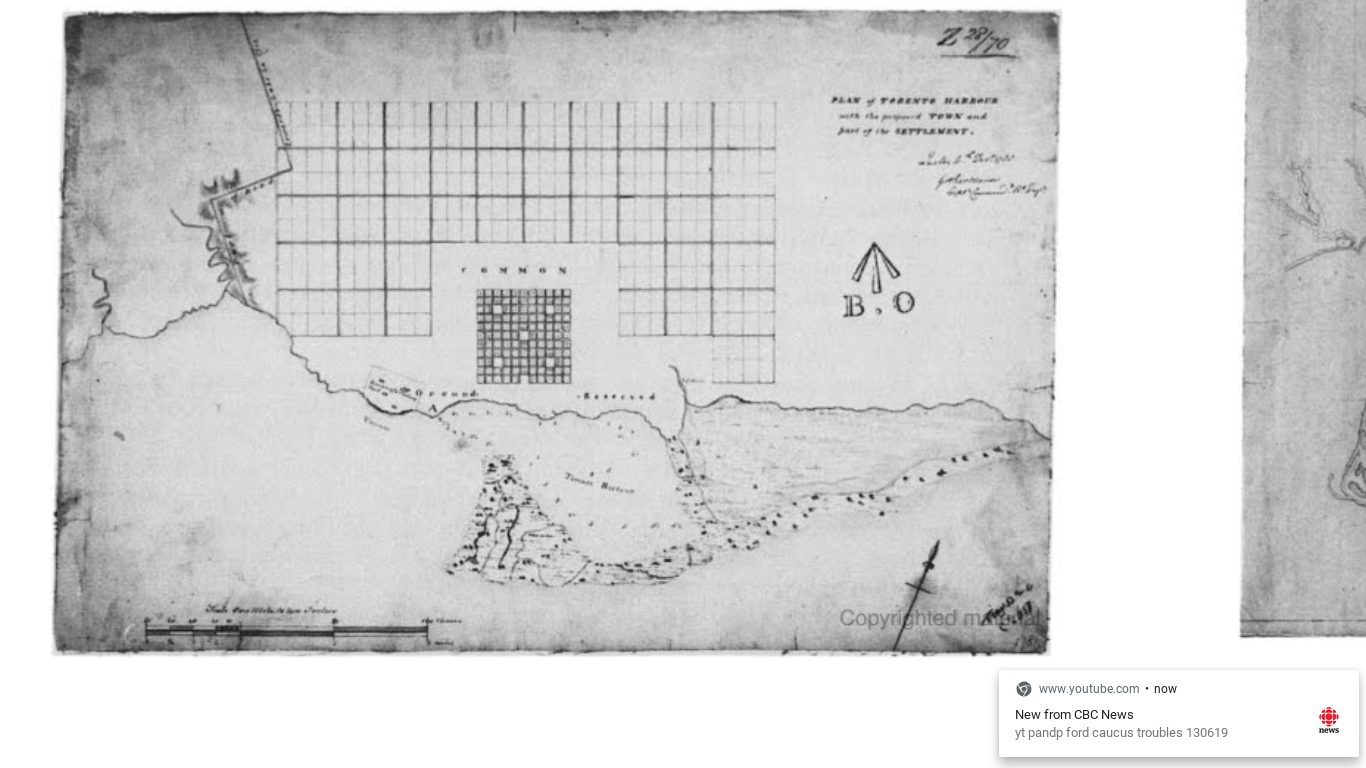
Torento Harbour, 1788

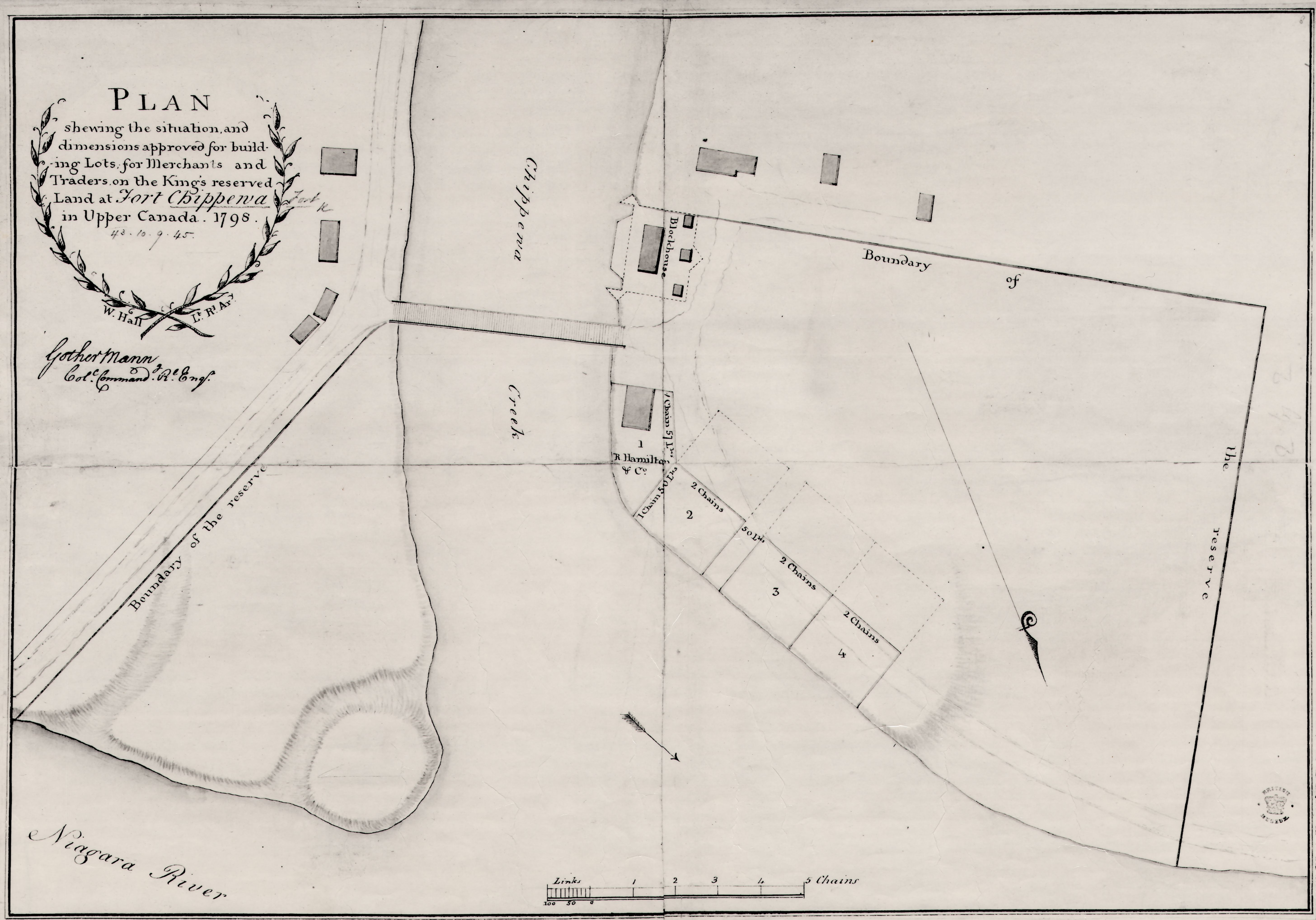
Fort Chippewa, Upper Canada, 1798

The following plans by Mann are in the British Library:

1. A drawn plan of the Isle aux Noix, with the new works proposed, 2 sheets, 1790;
2. A drawn plan of the Post at Isle aux Noix, showing the state of the works, and those proposed for connecting them together, 1790;
3. St. John Fort, Lower Canada, a drawn plan of part of Lake Champlain, with the communication down to St. John's, 2 sheets, 1791;
4. A drawn plan of Fort St. John on the river Chambly, 1791;
5. A drawn plan and sections of the new works proposed at St. John's, 1791.

The following drawn plans by Mann, formerly in the War Office, are now among the records of the government of Canada:

1. Plan of town and fortifications of Montreal, 1768;
2. Plan of Fort George, showing works of defence, n.d.;
3. Fort Erie, proposed work, n.d.;
4. Entrance of the Narrows between Lakes Erie and Detroit, n.d.;
5. St. Louis and Barrack bastions, with proposed works, and six sections, 1785;
6. Casemates proposed for forming a citadel, 1785;
7. Quebec and Heights of Abraham, with sections of works, 1785;
8. Military Ports, Lake Huron, Niagara, entrance of river to Detroit, Toronto Harbour, and Kingston Harbour, 1788;
9. Defences of Canada, 1788;
10. Position opposite Isle au Bois Blanc, 1796;
11. Isle aux Boix, and adjacent shores, showing present and proposed works, 2 sheets, 1797;
12. Works to be constructed at Amhurstburg, 1799;
13. Amhurstburgh and Isle au Bois Blanc, with works ordered to be constructed, 1799;
14. Ordnance Store House proposed for Cape Diamond Powder Magazine, 2 sheets, 1801;
15. City and Fortifications of Quebec with vicinity, 1804;
16. Citadel of Quebec, 2 sheets of sections, 1804;
17. Fortifications of Quebec, 1804.

== Sources ==
- Kendall, John C. (1987). "Mann, Gother". Dictionary of Canadian Biography (online ed.). Vol. 6. University of Toronto/Laval University. Retrieved 7 December 2022.
- Porter, Whitworth (1889). History of the Corps of Royal Engineers. Vol. 1. London: Longmans, Green, and Co. pp. 205, 215, 217, 403.
- Vetch, R. H.; Stearn, Roger T. (2004). "Mann, Gother (1747–1830), army officer and military engineer". Oxford Dictionary of National Biography (online ed.). Oxford University Press. doi:10.1093/ref:odnb/17944. (Subscription, Wikipedia Library access or UK public library membership required.)

Attribution:

- This article incorporates text from a publication now in the public domain: Vetch, Robert Hamilton (1893). "Mann, Gother". In Lee, Sidney (ed.). Dictionary of National Biography. Vol. 36. London: Smith, Elder & Co. pp. 40–41.
