= 211th Military Police Battalion =

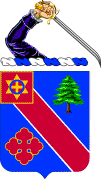
- Coat of arms
- Active: 1741 – Present
- Country: (Kingdom of Great Britain) Great Britain (1741–1776); United States (1776–Present)
- Allegiance: United States
- Branch: Military Police Corps
- Type: Military Police
- Size: Battalion
- Nickname: First Corps of Cadets (Special Designation)
- Motto: "It Points the Way"
- Engagements: World War II; Afghanistan; Iraq

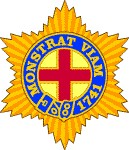
Distinctive unit insignia

The 211th Military Police Battalion ("First Corps of Cadets") is a unit of the Massachusetts Army National Guard. Its Headquarters and Headquarters Detachment is descended from the First Corps of Cadets, initially formed in 1741. It is one of several National Guard units with colonial roots. Its motto is Monstrat Viam – "It Points the Way." While it has served in five wars, the sub-unit's primary contribution to Massachusetts and to the United States was as an officer-producing institution for new regiments from the Revolutionary War through World War II.

== The inter-war years ==
The First Corps of Cadets was reorganized on 27 July 1921 as the 1st Separate Infantry Battalion. This was a temporary designation until the Massachusetts National Guard received its allotment of units. With this reorganization the Corps was no longer part of the 26th "Yankee" Division.

In March 1922, the Corps became the 211th Machinegun Battalion, Coast Artillery Corps but in May 1923 was reorganized again as the 2nd Battalion, 211th Artillery, Coast Artillery Corps and was federally recognized in April 1924.

The Corps was reorganized again as a two-battalion regiment in June 1926 as the 211th Coast Artillery (Anti-Aircraft). The Coast Artillery provided both coast and antiaircraft artillery units. With the Corps' new mission of antiaircraft artillery, it turned its attention toward recruiting and training for its federal mission. No longer was the Corps an exclusive social organization. Intelligent, educated young men were invited to join. Unlike other National Guard units however, prospective recruits had to be sponsored by a current member and were interviewed by a special committee before final acceptance in the Corps. Not all applicants were accepted. Drill pay was turned in to the unit fund to support the Armory and the many social, athletic and ceremonial activities of the Corps.

The Corps reorganized its regimental band, which played at the monthly dances. Drill and ceremonies were still an important part of the Corps' activities. A regimental parade was held every month and the Corps was reviewed by the governor on the Common each year. The only dress uniform was the Army issue Class A olive drab uniform with a choke collar, later changed to a roll collar with tie. In April 1929 the Corps returned to its prewar full dress uniform; however, only enough uniforms for the band, regimental color guard and a 100-man marching unit could be purchased due to the expense.

Drills were held once a week. Annual training was 15 days; initially summer camps were held at coast artillery installations such as Fort Wright and Fort Terry, then at Camp Edmands, Hingham and Camp Edwards. Massachusetts. The Corps was noted for its esprit de corps and spit and polish. The Corps' drill team competed in national drill competitions in full dress uniform. Athletics were very important and the Corps' teams attracted some of Boston's finest athletes. The 211th fielded baseball, football, track, pistol and rifle teams as well as a platoon of boxers. The biggest football game of the year was between the 211th and the 101st Engineers and was played at Harvard Stadium.

== World War II ==
The 211th went to three weeks of annual training at Plattsburgh Barracks, NY in the summer of 1940. There was a great deal of discussion that President Roosevelt had decided to mobilize the entire National Guard for one year of intensive training. The Corps was told that it would be one of the first units to mobilize. On August 31, 1940, President Roosevelt signed Executive Order 8350, ordering into the active military service of the United States a large number of National Guard units, including the 211th Coast Artillery (Anti-Aircraft). On 16 September the 211th Coast Artillery (AA), under the command of Colonel Stuart G. Hall, entered federal service at the Armory of the First Corps of Cadets in Boston.

The 211th was organized with the 1st battalion as a gun battalion equipped with three-inch antiaircraft guns while Battery A was the searchlight battery. The 2nd Battalion was equipped with .50 caliber machineguns and 37-mm guns. Total assigned were 51 officers, one warrant officer, and 1,280 enlisted men.

The Corps left Boston for Camp Edwards on 19 September. While at Camp Edwards, the 211th slept in tents, as contractors were busy building hundreds of new barracks. The Corps' stay was only temporary and in late October the regiment changed station to Camp Hulen, Texas, which became one of the Army's primary antiaircraft artillery training centers.

With the Corps in federal service, the Veteran Association organized a State Guard unit for state service. The First Motor Squadron began organizing in October 1940 and was accepted as a unit of the Massachusetts State Guard in February 1941. Unit personnel drilled on a weekly basis and attended annual training each summer. The First Motor Squadron was ordered into active state service several times during the war and was inactivated in October 1946.

The 211th was alerted for overseas movement to the Pacific in the fall of 1941. However, the bombing of Pearl Harbor resulted in the cancellation of the 211th's movement orders to the Pacific; instead the regiment received orders to immediately move to San Francisco which was changed to Vallejo, California. The 211th left Camp Hulen on 9–10 December by train and arrived in Vallejo on the 14th.

Under threat of a possible Japanese air attack, the 211th occupied hastily built battery positions to provide 24-hour air defense for Mare Island Naval Shipyard and Hamilton Field. In June 1942 the 1st Battalion was issued 90mm guns. A new 3rd Battalion was activated to provide searchlight support. The Corps' strength was over 1,500 men.

Because the 211th was performing an important stateside mission, it was destined to remain in the U.S. during World War II. In August 1943, the regiment was reorganized to consist of Headquarters and Headquarters Battery, 211th Antiaircraft Artillery Group; the 1st Battalion was redesignated as the 772nd Antiaircraft Artillery Gun Battalion; the 2nd Battalion was redesignated as the 747th Antiaircraft Artillery Automatic Weapons Battalion; the 3rd Battalion was redesignated as the 324th Antiaircraft Artillery Searchlight Battalion; and the regimental band was redesignated as the 491st Army Service Forces Band.

By this time in the war, hundreds of Cadets had either been commissioned after attending Officer Candidate School or had been reassigned as cadre for new antiaircraft battalions. The First Corps of Cadets lived up to its name by providing the leadership for new wartime units. Former Cadets served in every theater of the war.

The 211th Group and the 772nd and 747th Battalions continued to defend vital installations and provide replacements for overseas service. On a sad note, COL Hall, who had commanded the Corps since 1937 and the 211th Group, died in a plane crash in May 1944. The 211th and its elements were deactivated in 1944 and 1945. The 324th served in Alaska and was deactivated in 1944.

== Loss and return to its roots ==
The Corps was quick to reorganize after its World War II service; in order to keep its identity and history, it decided to organize as a separate battalion. Massachusetts was allotted a separate cavalry squadron and the Corps reorganized as the 211th Cavalry Reconnaissance Squadron and was federally recognized on 7 November 1946. In January 1949, the designation changed again. The 26th Infantry Division was short its organic tank battalion, so the Corps was reorganized and redesignated as the 126th Tank Battalion. During the next 47 years, the Corps would have to be redesignated and converted to another branch in order to remain in the National Guard force structure.

In another major reorganization of the Massachusetts National Guard, in 1959 the Corps reorganized as the 1st Battle Group (later the 1st Battalion), 220th Infantry. After 59 years, the Corps returned to its traditional infantry mission but could not reclaim its traditional federal number of 211 since the 211th Infantry was assigned to the Florida National Guard. With the 1959 reorganization, only Headquarters Company and Company A were left in the Cadet Armory; B was in Newton; C and D were in Waltham and E and Support were in Cambridge.

In 1964, Headquarters Company, 1st Battalion, 220th Infantry, the only remaining element of the Corps in the Cadet Armory, moved to Cambridge. The Veteran Association was forced to sell the Armory. This was a serious blow that had a major negative effect on the Corps; the Cadet Armory with its museum and displays was a showcase of the history and traditions of the First Corps of Cadets.

The Veteran Association purchased a townhouse at 227 Commonwealth Avenue in Boston and moved the museum there. However, despite the 220th Infantry located in Cambridge and Somerville, the physical separation from the museum and the veterans resulted in no loss of regimental pride, identity and esprit. However, in April 1975, after the end of the war in Vietnam and as part of the Army's general reorganization, the 220th Infantry was deemed no longer needed and its elements were broken up and most of its men became proud members of the 182nd Infantry and remained part of the 26th Yankee Division.

At the last minute, officials of the Adjutant General's Office realized that they had to save the lineage of the First Corps of Cadets. With the concurrence of the Army's Chief of Military History the state consolidated elements of the 220th Infantry with the 126th Signal Battalion. The 126th had been organized in 1959 from existing Artillery units.

While the intent to save the history of the First Corps of Cadets was admirable the shotgun marriage with the 126th Signal Battalion was not initially happy. It was not until the late 1980s that the battalion began wearing the historic Corps insignia and began to take part in the traditional activities of the Corps.

In 1991 the 126th Signal Battalion was identified as being excess to the needs of the Army when the Army decided to deactivate the 26th Infantry Division. While the Yankee Division deactivated in September 1993, the 126th Signal Battalion managed to hang on until 1996. From 1993 to 1996 the VAFCC worked with the Adjutant General to insure that there would be a place for the Corps in the new force structure of the Massachusetts National Guard.

After serving as infantry, engineers, antiaircraft artillery, cavalry, armor, infantry again and signals the Corps became a battalion of military police. In early 1996, it was decided that the 126th Signal Battalion would consolidate with the Headquarters and Headquarters Detachment, 685th Military Police Battalion in Newton. The new organization became Headquarters and Headquarters Detachment, 211th Military Police Battalion (First Corps of Cadets). The Corps' traditional federal number 211 was restored on 26 July 1996, and a formal military parade was held on the Newton Town Green. Lieutenant Colonel Richard Spicer was presented with the colors of the 211th along with the Bowdoin sword signifying his assumption of command of the First Corps of Cadets.

The 211th's new mission as a military police battalion in command and control of the 747th, 772nd, and 972nd Military Police Companies retain the esprit, history and tradition of the First Corps of Cadets.

== Activation to federal duty in the War on Terrorism ==
On 11 September 2001 after the attack on the World Trade Center in New York City members of the 211th MP Battalion, the Active Unit of the First Corps of Cadets, reported to their respective armories without waiting for formal notification from the governor of the state of Massachusetts or a formal state of emergency being declared by federal authorities. Within hours the unit was activated to state duty to provide security at Logan International Airport.

Currently elements of the 211th MP Battalion are on active duty serving overseas, and in various stateside locations.

Under its designation as a military police battalion commanding the 747th, 772nd, and 972nd Military Police Companies, the 211th Military Police Battalion traces its lineage to the First Corps of Cadets. Personnel of the battalion wear the unit's distinctive unit insignia, which features the motto Monstrat Viam ("It Points the Way").

== Heraldry ==
The heraldic items approved for the 211th Military Police Battalion (First Corps of Cadets) consists of a coat of arms and a distinctive unit insignia.

Coat of arms The coat of arms consists of a blue shield which represents the infantry origin of the Corps, a yellow botonny cross which represents the Civil War service of the 45th Massachusetts Infantry as part of the XVIII Corps in the upper left is the six-pointed star insignia of the Corps, the pine tree signifies service in the Revolutionary War, the red and white stripe signifies the service of the Corps in World War I as the 101st Engineers. The coat of arms was approved by the War Department on 19 October 1922.

For its distinctive unit insignia the Corps adopted an insignia that it had been using on its colors, buttons and belt buckles since 1786 and possibly earlier. The insignia is a variation of that worn by the Coldstream Guards of the British Army. It is based on the star of the Order of the Garter, which King William III authorized for use on the colors of the Coldstream Guards in 1696. The Corps' insignia is a red cross on a yellow disc, with a blue garter belt bearing the motto and date Monstrat Viam 1741 resting on a gold six-pointed star.

Why the First Corps of Cadets adopted this insignia is open to speculation. One theory is that since the Cadets served as the bodyguard to the royal governor of Massachusetts, it guarded the king's personal representative, and was, in effect, the household guard of Massachusetts. The Cadets wore a uniform similar to that worn by the Coldstream Guards and then adopted the insignia from the Guards' colors as their own.

The First Corps of Cadets' first distinctive unit insignia, based on its coat of arms, was approved for the 211th Coast Artillery in 1923 and was worn until 1944. It was one of the few units in the Army to have its designation on a scroll around the insignia "Two Hundred Eleventh First Corps Cadets Mass. N.G. Artillery." When the Corps was redesignated as cavalry, it was no longer appropriate to wear this insignia. Lieutenant Colonel Richard C. Storey, the commander in 1948, requested Department of the Army approval for the Cadets to wear its traditional insignia as its distinctive unit insignia. Someone in the unit designed the insignia and had a sample made. The Army approved it in 1950. As the 126th Tank Battalion, the Cadets began wearing the insignia on its uniforms the same year.

== Colors ==
The colors of the 211th Military Police Battalion Corps are of a standard issue Military Police battalion color, which is green with yellow fringe. In the body of the eagle is the coat of arms below which is the motto Monstrat Viam. Above the eagle is the crest of the Massachusetts National Guard, which is the arm of Myles Standish holding a sword.

The colors are currently authorized 21 campaign streamers for service in the Revolutionary War, Civil War, and World Wars I and II. Also authorized is the Philippine Presidential Unit Citation streamer. For parades, the 211th also carries a color consisting of its distinctive insignia on a white field.

== History of the 772nd Military Police Company ==
Cohannet Train Band Organized in 1638 as the Cohannet Train Band, Plymouth Colony Militia, the 772nd Military Police Company is the oldest company-sized unit in the Army National Guard. In 1639 when Taunton was incorporated, the unit became the Taunton Train Band. This was the first of many redesignations in the 772nd's history.

Company history The company was assigned to the Plymouth Regiment in 1658 and later, in 1685 when Bristol County was incorporated, to the Bristol County Regiment. In 1736 it was assigned to the 3rd Regiment, Bristol County Brigade, Plymouth Colony Militia.

The company responded to the alarm for Lexington and Concord on 19 April 1775 they did not see any fighting but probably took part in the siege of Boston. The Taunton militia took part in two campaigns against the British; in New York in 1776 and in Rhode Island in 1777.

As Captain Reed's Company, the unit was in federal service in September 1814 as a guard against British attack during the War of 1812. By 1831, the company had changed from obligatory service under federal and state militia laws to volunteer service as a light infantry company. For the first time, unit personnel were fully armed, equipped, uniformed and drilled on a regular basis whereas before individual militiamen provided their own weapons and equipment. In 1842 the company became Company C, 2nd Battalion of Light Infantry and in 1855 it became Company C, 4th Regiment. The 772nd Military Police Company is one of only nineteen Army National Guard units with campaign credit for the War of 1812.

The 4th was called into federal service twice during the Civil War; for three months in 1861, fighting in the Battle of Big Bethel, Va.; and for nine months from Sept. 1862 to August 1863, taking part in the Siege of Port Hudson, La.

Reorganized after the war as Company F, 3rd Regiment, the unit was converted to coastal artillery in 1897. During World War I, the Taunton unit served as the 24th Company, Coast Defenses of Boston. In 1920 the unit converted to field artillery as Battery F, 101st Field Artillery.

The battery was ordered into federal service in January 1941 when the 26th Infantry Division began intensive training prior to World War II at Camp Edwards. Redesignated again as Battery C, 212th Armored Field Artillery Battalion, the Taunton unit, as part of the 6th Armored Division, fought in Europe. It took part in campaigns in France, Belgium and Germany as part of General Patton's Third Army.

The battery reorganized in 1947 and was redesignated in 1955 as Battery B, 126th Antiaircraft Artillery Battalion and in 1959 as Battery B, 2nd Battalion, 211th Artillery. It rejoined the 101st Field Artillery in 1963.

In December 1967 the unit received its current designation as the 772nd Military Police Company. It also consolidated with the Attleboro unit which as, Company I, 101st Infantry, was awarded the Presidential Unit Citation for gallantry in action at Lorraine, France.

In April 1975 the 747th Military Police Company merged with the 772nd. The 747th brought to the 772nd a distinguished lineage being descendant from the Standish Guards of Plymouth, which were originally formed in 1818 and, possibly, descendant from the original militia company of Plymouth Colony commanded by Captain Miles Standish.

In 1990 the 772nd absorbed personnel from the 747th MP Company and HHD, 685th MP Battalion.

On 7 January 1991 the 772nd was ordered into federal service for duty in the Gulf War. It provided reconnaissance and security for main supply routes. The 772nd was released on 14 May 1991.

In 1995, the 772nd changed station to Brockton after being stationed in Taunton for 357 years. The current location of the 772nd Military Police Company has moved back to Taunton. In 2002 the 772nd Military Police Company was deployed in support of Operation Enduring Freedom in Bagram and Kabul Afghanistan providing base security. In 2009 the 772MP Co was deployed to Al Kut, Iraq, where they spent the year training the local police forces and assisted in Military operations. On 30 March 2010, the guard members of the 772nd responded to local flooding in Operation Rising Water. Also, the 772nd was responded to a statewide activation in response to Hurricane Earl on 3 September 2010. The 772nd was once again activated for Hurricane Sandy on 22 October 2012 and responded to the City of New York.

== History of the 972nd Military Police Company ==
The 972nd was originally organized in April 1917 as a battery of field artillery in Gloucester. The unit served as Battery A, 102d Field Artillery, 26th Division in World War I earning six campaign honors. Battery A entered federal service again in January 1941 prior to World War II.

During the war it was redesignated as Battery A, 211th Field Artillery Battalion, assigned to the 26th Division Artillery. The battery earned three campaign honors for action in France, Belgium and Germany.

In 1947 the battery was reorganized and in 1959 received its old designation back as Battery A, 2nd Battalion, 1O2nd Artillery. In 1974 the unit changed station to Lexington. In April 1975 the unit received its present designation, 972nd MP Company, when it converted to military police. The 972nd moved to Newton in 1980.

The 972nd entered federal service in November 1990 for duty in the Gulf War. For its service, it was awarded the Meritorious Unit Commendation and three campaign honors. The 972nd was released in May 1991. In October 1994, the 972nd changed station to Melrose, but later moved to Reading.

Since 9/11, the 972nd has been called upon for federal service in support of the War on Terrorism in the Middle East including a deployment to Uzbekistan, Afghanistan, and Pakistan in 2002–2003, Baghdad, Iraq in 2007–2008, and Qatar in 2012–2013. The unit also supports Massachusetts State Police during state activations, such as the Boston Marathon.

== History of the 747th Military Police Company ==
The 747th Military Police Company is the newest unit within the 211th Military Police Battalion, officially constituted in 1995 in Southbridge, Massachusetts, and federally recognized in 1997. Despite its relatively recent formation, the 747th has established a distinguished record through multiple deployments and state activations, supporting both military operations abroad and humanitarian missions at home. Since 2001, the company has been deployed four times and has been called upon frequently to assist during state emergencies.

2003 – Operation Enduring Freedom (Afghanistan) In 2003, the 747th deployed for a nine-month mission in support of Operation Enduring Freedom. The company was divided into platoons, each assigned to critical locations across Afghanistan:

- Bagram Air Force Base: Provided security operations and force protection for military personnel and infrastructure.
- U.S. Embassy in Kabul: Delivered high-level security for diplomatic missions and key American personnel.
- Kabul Military Training Center (KMTC): Supported military training initiatives and worked with coalition forces to enhance the capabilities of the [[Afghan 
    National Army]].

Daily operations included conducting force protection missions, executing presence patrols in local villages to ensure security and foster positive relations with Afghan civilians, offering private security details (PSD) for high-ranking leaders, and supporting Special Forces operations. The mission was led by Captain Margaret Oglesby and First Sergeant Aaron Washington.

2005 – Hurricane Katrina Relief (Louisiana) In response to the devastation caused by Hurricane Katrina, the 747th was activated and deployed to Louisiana for approximately six weeks. Their mission focused on supporting local law enforcement and providing critical humanitarian assistance. Soldiers conducted:

- Health and welfare checks for affected residents.
- Distribution of essential supplies and humanitarian aid.
- Security patrols to assist law enforcement in maintaining order during the recovery effort.

2005–2009 – State Emergency Response (Massachusetts) During this period, the company was frequently activated to respond to various state emergencies across Massachusetts. These missions included:

- Assisting during periods of severe winter storms by providing transportation, medical evacuation support, and traffic control.
- Responding to severe flooding, including evacuations and infrastructure protection.
- Supporting Boston Marathon Law Enforcement by providing security and logistical assistance during the annual event.

2009 – Operation Iraqi Freedom (Iraq) In 2009, the 747th deployed for a 12-month mission to support Operation Iraqi Freedom. The deployment began with initial training in Kuwait and Baghdad, preparing the unit for its primary mission—overseeing Police Transition Teams (PTTs) tasked with strengthening local Iraqi law enforcement capabilities.

The company's operations were focused primarily in the Al Anbar Governorate, with teams assigned to multiple cities, including: Fallujah, Anah, Al Qaim, Rutbah, Hit, Haditha, Rawah and Haqlaniyah.

These missions involved training and mentoring Iraqi district police leaders to improve law enforcement standards and promote stability. Later in the deployment, the company reconsolidated at Al Asad Air Base, where they provided force protection for personnel and critical assets. Under the command of Captain James Jones and First Sergeant Michael Domnarski, the 747th's outstanding performance earned them the prestigious Meritorious Unit Commendation.

2011 – Springfield Tornado Relief (Massachusetts) Following a devastating tornado in Springfield, Massachusetts, the company was activated for approximately six weeks. Their mission included:

- Assisting local law enforcement with health and welfare checks.
- Providing traffic control to ensure public safety.
- Offering security support to prevent looting and maintain order during recovery efforts.

2012 – Hurricane Sandy Relief (New York and New Jersey) In response to the destruction caused by Hurricane Sandy, the 747th was deployed to New York City and New Jersey for approximately five weeks. The company's duties focused on:

- Distributing humanitarian aid to affected communities.
- Assisting in the recovery and stabilization of impacted neighborhoods.

2013 – Boston Marathon Bombing Response In the aftermath of the Boston Marathon Bombings, the company was activated to provide critical security for the city. They worked in coordination with local and state authorities during the manhunt for suspect Dzhokhar Tsarnaev. Their roles included:

- Providing heightened security coverage throughout Boston.
- Supporting law enforcement in securing vital infrastructure and high-traffic areas.
- Assisting in the operational planning and execution of security checkpoints during the suspect's capture.

2014 – Operation Enduring Freedom (Guantanamo Bay, Cuba) In 2014, the 747th deployed for 12 months to Guantanamo Bay, Cuba, in support of Operation Enduring Freedom. Their mission centered on conducting detention operations, ensuring the humane and lawful treatment of detainees while upholding international legal standards.

The deployment was led by Captain Tyler Field and First Sergeant William Dufault. For their outstanding service and professionalism, the company was awarded the Army Superior Unit Award.

2023 – Border Security Operations (Texas) Most recently, in 2023, the 747th was deployed for 12 months to the Texas border to support ongoing border security operations. The company, under the leadership of Captain Joshua Griffith and First Sergeant Daniel Grzybowski, played a critical role in:

- Assisting with border patrol operations alongside federal and state agencies.
- Providing logistical support and conducting security patrols.
- Supporting humanitarian efforts for individuals encountered during border operations.

== See also ==
- First Corps of Cadets (Massachusetts), predecessor to the 211th.
