= The Borden-Field Museum Alaska-Arctic Expedition of 1927 =

Expedition

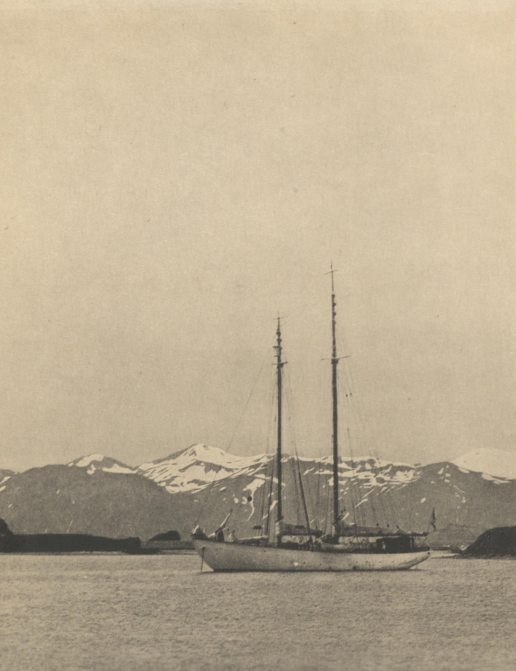
- The ship designed and built for the Borden-Field Museum Alaska-Arctic Expedition of 1927 named The Northern Light. Here it is depicted cruising in Canoe Bay, Alaska.
- Leader: Mr. John Borden
- Start: San Francisco, California; 21 April 1927
- End: 10 September 1927
- Ships: The Northern Light
- Crew: John Borden; Mrs. John Borden; Rochester B. Slaughter; Mrs. Rochester B. Slaughter; Charles B. Goodspeed; Mrs. Charles B. Goodspeed; Frances Ames; T. Ashley Hine

The Borden-Field Museum Alaska-Arctic Expedition of 1927 (21 April 1927 – 10 September 1927) was a scientific hunting expedition sponsored and led by John Borden. The purpose of the expedition was to obtain collections of land and sea mammal from Alaska and its neighboring regions for the Field Museum of Natural History of Chicago, Illinois. The expedition lasted five months starting from San Francisco, California, and they sailed as far north as Wrangel Island off the northern Siberian coast.

The expedition resulted in the collection of several large mammal specimens, 106 botanical specimens, 111 bird specimens, 533 ethnological specimens from Indigenous peoples of the region, several photographs, and film reels.

== Background ==
In the late 19th and early 20th centuries, explorers such as Roald Amundsen, Knud Rasmussen, and Vilhjalmur Stefansson conducted influential Arctic expeditions. Many institutions, like the Field Museum, also began conducting expeditions around the world during this time in pursuit of collections for display and scientific research.

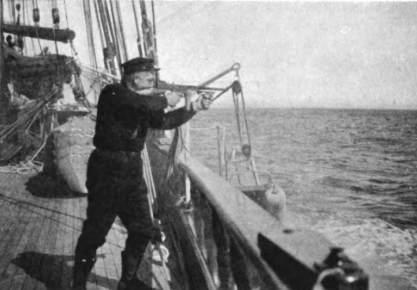
Mr. John Borden on board the Northern Light. He was the leader and captain of the Borden-Field Museum Alaska-Arctic Expedition of 1927.

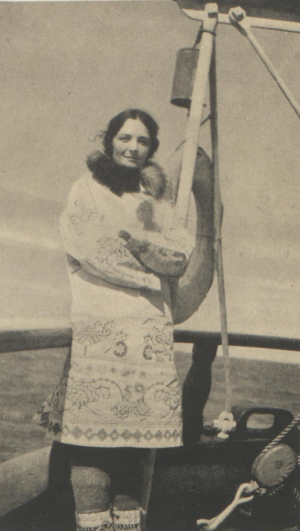
Mrs. Borden, wife of Captain John Borden.

John Borden (21 May 1884 – 29 July 1961) was a wealthy Chicago real-estate attorney, sportsman, explorer, and a Trustee of the Field Museum of Natural History. He was the founder of the Yellow Cab Company of Chicago, and he was the father-in-law to Adlai Stevenson.

Borden had previously taken hunting expeditions to Alaska in 1913 and 1916. On his 1916 expedition, his ship, The Great Bear, became lost and wrecked off the Aleutian Islands due to treacherous storms. No lives were lost, and the crew was rescued and brought back to Nome, Alaska.

Because of his eagerness to return to the region and his ties with the Field Museum, Borden financed the 1927 expedition himself with the intention of contributing scientific knowledge and collections to the museum. In particular, their aim was to obtain land and sea mammals such as the Alaskan brown bear, polar bear, and walrus. The expedition was supported by Stanley Field, President of the Field Museum, and D. C. Davies, Director of the Field Museum.

=== The Northern Light ===
Borden had a brand new vessel created for the expedition, and it was named The Northern Light. It was a 140-ft auxiliary schooner yacht specifically designed to withstand ice. The ship was designed by Chicago naval architect Henry C. Grebe and it was built in Oakland, California by W. F. Stone & Son. When the ship set sail, it carried four Atlantic dories, two sealing boats prepared for whaling, two canoes with motors, a launch with a rudder, and twelve tons of coal.

== Expedition crew ==
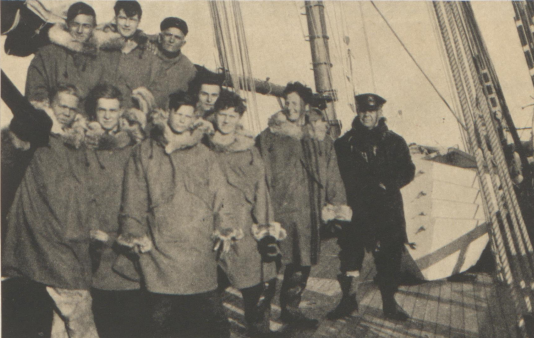
Eight sea scouts were selected to join the Borden-Field Museum Alaska-Arctic Expedition in 1927.

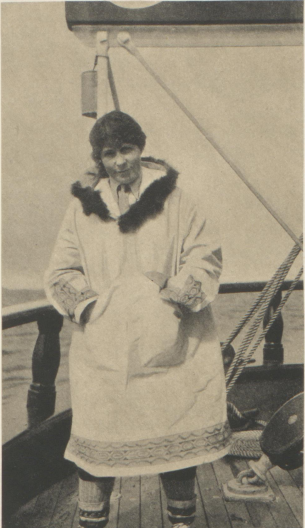
Mrs. R. B. Slaughter, crew member of the Borden-Field Museum Alaska-Arctic Expedition of 1927. She was a key hunter in the crew, helping to collect large mammal specimens for the Field Museum.

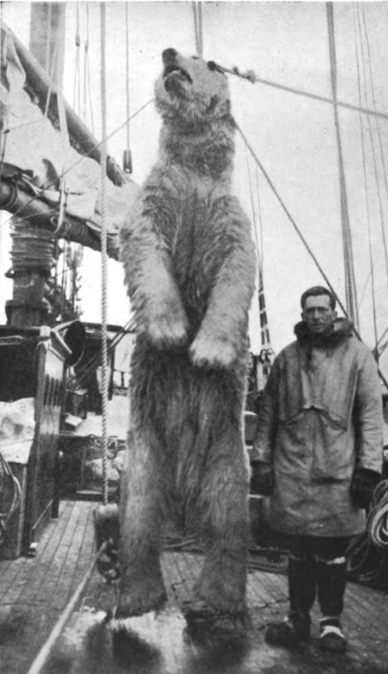
Mr. Rochester B. Slaughter was a key hunter on the Borden-Field Museum Alaska-Arctic Expedition of 1927. Here he is depicted with a polar bear he hunted for the museum.

John Borden was the expedition captain, and second in command was William F. Joseph, who was a retired whaling captain who acted as the crew's Executive Officer. The crew of the ship also included: Harry Olsen (first mate), Hans Dahl (second mate), Henry Erickson (chief engineer), Fred Stephan (second engineer), Ralph W. Hart (radio operator), A. Henderson (chef), Mrs. Henderson (stewardess), William Whatmough (steward), Alfonse Canac (chef), and Pierre Marquette (second chef).

Notable members of the crew who participated in hunting and preparation of scientific collections included: Mrs. Courtney Borden, Mr. and Mrs. Rochester B. Slaughter, Mr. and Mrs. Charles B. Goodspeed, Miss Frances Ames, Miss Edith Cummings, and Mr. T. Ashley Hine.

Eight sea scouts participated in the expedition, and the National Sea Scout Director, Lieutenant Keane, accompanied the crew on the first leg of the trip from San Francisco to Victoria, British Colombia

=== Women of the expedition ===
The women of the expedition played a significant role, particularly in hunting. Mrs. Borden, Miss Ames, and Mrs. Slaughter all successfully hunted Alaskan brown bears, the largest one of the expedition being hunted by Mrs. Slaughter. They were the first American women to travel as far north as Wrangell Island.

Mrs. Borden's maiden name was Courtney Louise Letts. She and John Borden were married in 1925 and divorced in 1933. She wrote a book about the expedition titled The Cruise of the Northern Light published by The Macmillan Company in 1928.

=== Sea Scouts ===
Approximately 200 sea scouts from across the country ranging from 15–20 years old volunteered to join the expedition. Among the scouts chosen were Johnson Powers, Bruno Andrews, Kenneth McClelland, Steven Ram, James Ryan, Jack Holbrook, Ted Purcell, and Otto Carstensen. The selection process was strict and rigorous; the scouts were chosen based on their Sea Scouting performance, seamanship, character, mental fitness, and physical fitness. In fact, the physical exam was the same required of United States Naval Officers.

== Expedition timeline ==
The crew set sail on The Northern Light from Oakland Bay in San Francisco, California on April 21, 1927. Their first stop was in Victoria, British Columbia on April 27. Several days were spent in Victoria, and on May 7, Mr. and Mrs. Slaughter and Mr. and Mrs. Goodspeed joined the crew.

They sailed up the Alaskan coast, making stops in Ketchikan and Juneau. They sailed across the Gulf of Alaska and made stops in the Aleutian Islands, including to Unimak and Unalaska. They made stops on various other islands in the region such as Bogoslof and the Pribilof islands. In these islands, they hunted Alaskan brown bears and seals.

From there, they sailed up to Nome, Alaska. This is where T. Ashley Hine, a Field Museum ornithologist and taxidermist, met the crew.

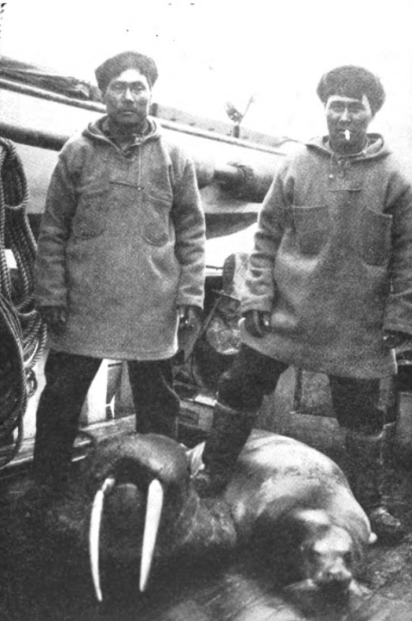
Two Indigenous walrus hunters from King Island, Alaska, joined the crew to guide them into the treacherous Arctic Ocean and to hunt walruses.

They sailed to King Island where they collected murres and puffins. Additionally, the crew were joined by two Indigenous walrus hunters who guided the crew north into the Arctic Ocean.

They sailed across the Bering Strait and along the Siberian coast. They were greeted by groups of Chukchi people in Cape Serdtse-Kamen on Siberia's north coast.

After leaving the Siberian coast, they cruised to Point Hope, Alaska. There, they received collections of carved ivory and jade implements from the Indigenous peoples.

Their final and northernmost destination was Wrangel Island. They did not go ashore the island because it was settled by the USSR. However, they sailed around the island and hunted polar bears off the coast from whaleboats.

They then sailed 4,000 miles back to San Francisco, arriving on September 10, 1927.

== Collections ==
Many zoological, botanical, and anthropological specimens were collected by the expedition crew and donated to the Field Museum.

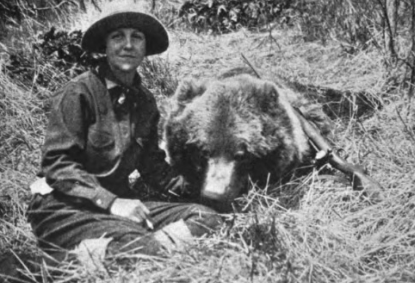
Miss Frances Ames, crew member of the Borden-Field Museum Alaska-Arctic Expedition of 1927, with the Alaska Peninsula brown bear she hunted. The women on the expedition proved to be the most skilled hunters.

Most notably, several large mammals were hunted: 4 Alaskan brown bears, 4 polar bears, 4 walruses, and 1 seal. The Alaskan brown bear and polar bear specimens were highly valued by the Field Museum as they filled an immediate need for the Hall of American Mammal Habitat Groups. In January 1930, diorama displays of both types of bear were completed and open to the public, and they remain on display today

106 plant specimens were obtained, mostly wild flowers from the region. These samples were prepared by Ms. Frances Ames

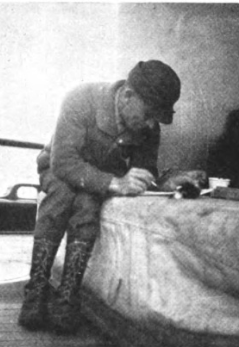
Mr. T Ashley Hine, ornithologist and taxidermist for the Field Museum of Natural History. He joined the expedition crew in Nome, Alaska, and he helped collect and prepare many water bird specimens for exhibition purposes.

111 bird specimens, mostly water birds were collected and utilized for exhibition purposes. Among the birds collected were murre, parakeet auklet, horned and turfted puffin, pigeon guillemot, glaucous-winged gull, fox sparrow, golden-crowned sparrow, and Savannah sparrow, Alaskan longspur, redpoll, golden plover

There were many significant collections obtained from various Indigenous communities of Alaska and the Arctic regions of Canada. These 533 objects included copper knives, copper arrowheads, ancient mammoth ivory carvings, carved walrus tusks, figures and toys made of walrus ivory, stone and ceramic cooking vessels, jade axes, bone and ivory harpoon points, and various other weapons.
