= Winchester Center Historic District =

Historic district in Massachusetts, United States

- U.S. National Register of Historic Places
- U.S. Historic district
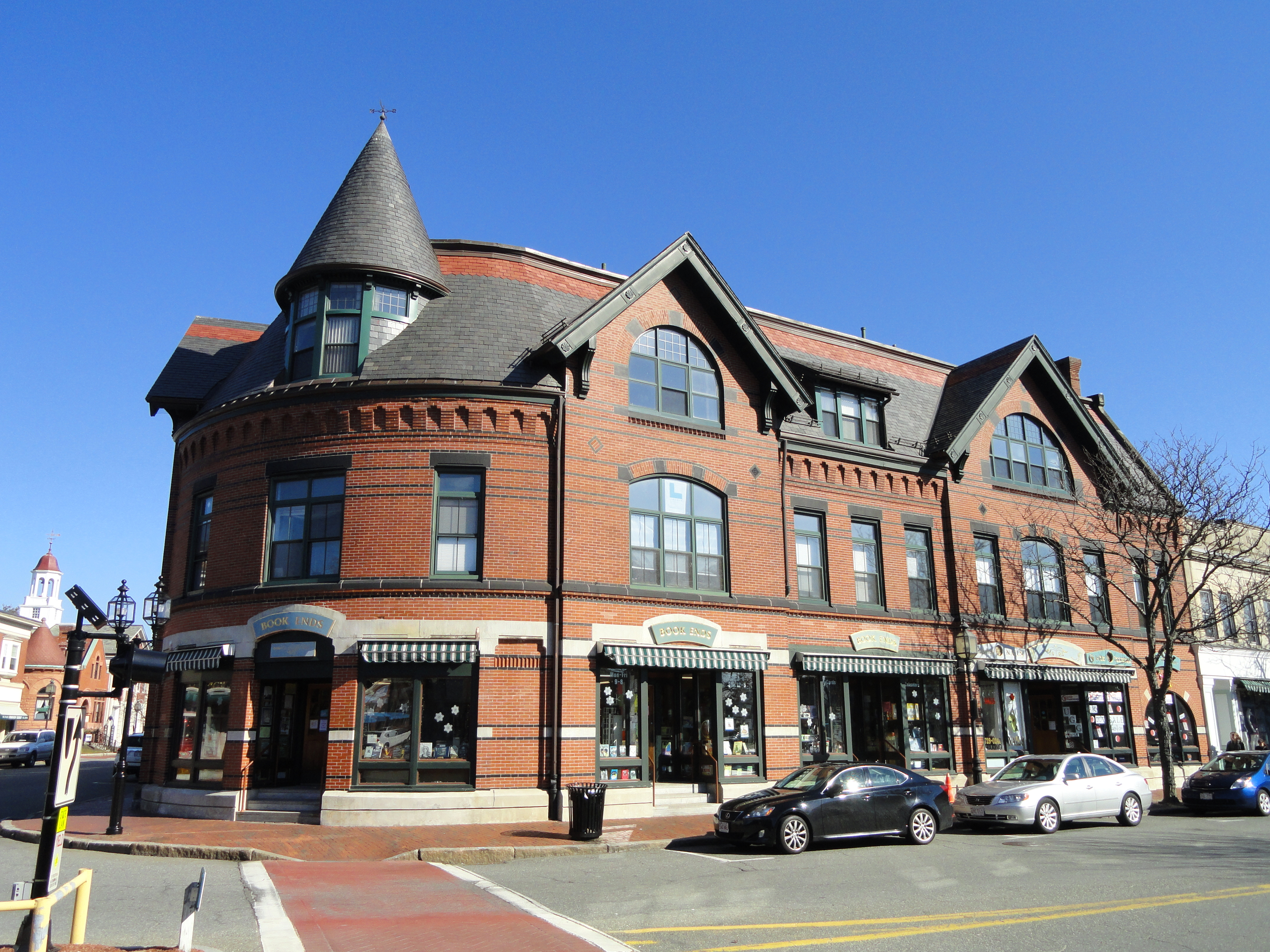
- Book Ends

- Location within Massachusetts Location within the United States
- Location: Winchester, Massachusetts
- Coordinates: 42°27′7″N 71°8′13″W
- Area: 40 acres (16 ha)
- Architect: Coit, Robert; Fletcher, Asa
- Architectural style: Late 19th And 20th Century Revivals, Late Victorian
- NRHP reference No.: 86002943
- Added to NRHP: November 21, 1986

The Winchester Center Historic District encompasses the commercial and civic heart of Winchester, Massachusetts. It is roughly bounded Mt. Vernon and Washington Streets, Waterfield Road, Church and Main Streets. The district includes a number of Romanesque Revival buildings, including Winchester Town Hall and the Winchester Savings Bank building on Mount Vernon Street. Noted architects who contributed to the district include Robert Coit and Asa Fletcher. The district was listed on the National Register of Historic Places in 1986.

== Description and history ==
The area that is now Winchester was first settled beginning in the 1640s, and was known as South Woburn. What is now the town center began as the site of a grist mill and bridge on the Aberjona River. The community remained largely agrarian until the Boston and Lowell Railroad was built through the area in 1835. This spurred immediate growth and prompted the growth of a village center. When Winchester was separated from Woburn in 1850, it became the town's civic and religious center, with the construction of the First Congregational Church (first church burned 1853, present church built 1854) on the west side of the center.

Commercial and civic buildings from the early period of growth, and of a second spurt of growth after the American Civil War survive in the center, including the Romanesque Winchester Town Hall (1887), and the 1879 Brown and Stanton Block at Main and Mount Vernon Streets. Growth continued in the early 20th century, with the Beaux Arts Lincoln School (1903), the Colonial Revival Police and Fire Station (1914), and the Gothic Revival library (1931), designed by local architect Robert Coit. The most significant ahistorical modification to the district is the elevation of the Boston and Lowell line, effectively bisecting the district.

== See also ==
- National Register of Historic Places listings in Winchester, Massachusetts
