= Winchester Savings Bank =

- U.S. National Register of Historic Places
- U.S. Historic district – Contributing property
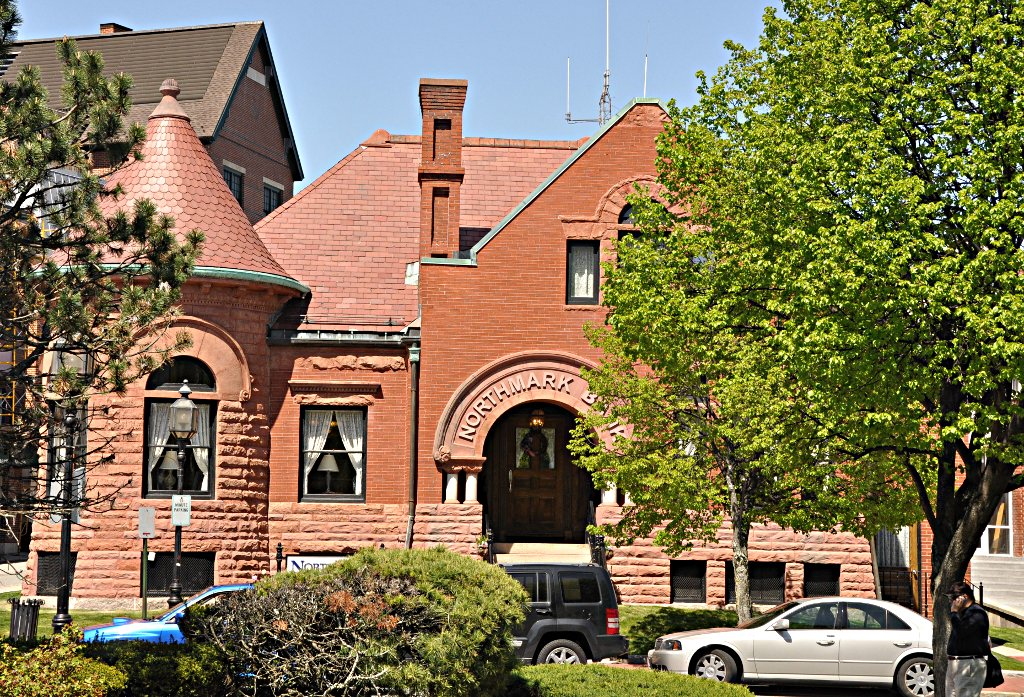

- Location within Massachusetts Location within the United States
- Location: Winchester, Massachusetts
- Coordinates: 42°27′12″N 71°8′8″W
- Built: 1892
- Architect: William E. & Edwin K. Blaikie
- Architectural style: Romanesque
- Part of: Winchester Center Historic District (ID86002943)
- NRHP reference No.: 79000361

Significant dates
- Added to NRHP: June 19, 1979
- Designated CP: November 21, 1986

The Winchester Savings Bank is a bank headquartered at 661 Main Street in Winchester, Massachusetts.

The bank is an independent, mutual, state-chartered institution with a mission of meeting the financial needs of the communities which it serves. The bank is directed by a board of trustees elected by the bank's corporators, a group of civic-minded, local individuals. Since the Bank is mutual, all profits from operations are reinvested in the bank.

== History ==
The Winchester Savings Bank was established by the Massachusetts Legislature and incorporated on March 3, 1871. The first meeting of the Corporators was held in Lyceum Hall (the building at the corner of Main and Mt. Vernon Streets in Winchester) on July 11, 1871. The Bank first opened its doors for business on August 26, 1871, in a banking room on the north side of Main Street. It was generally predicted that the Bank would not be a success, but on opening day, $11,058 was deposited, with most of this total coming from the bank's trustees and corporators.

In 1880, the bank moved to the second floor of the Brown and Stanton Block on Main Street, and remained there until 1892 when it moved into its newly constructed building at 26 Mt. Vernon Street. The bank's main office was moved on December 10, 1979, to its present location at 661 Main Street. Since its founding in 1871, the bank has grown into a full-service financial institution.

== Building ==
The bank's first purpose-built headquarters is a Richardsonian Romanesque structure was built in 1892 by William Blaikie and was added to the National Register of Historic Places in 1979. Its entry is recessed in a round arch that is supported by marble columns. The second floor feature a Palladian window, and the roof is shingled in fish-scale slate. A two-story turret on the left is capped by a conical roof.

== See also ==
- National Register of Historic Places listings in Winchester, Massachusetts
