= Golden State (schooner) =

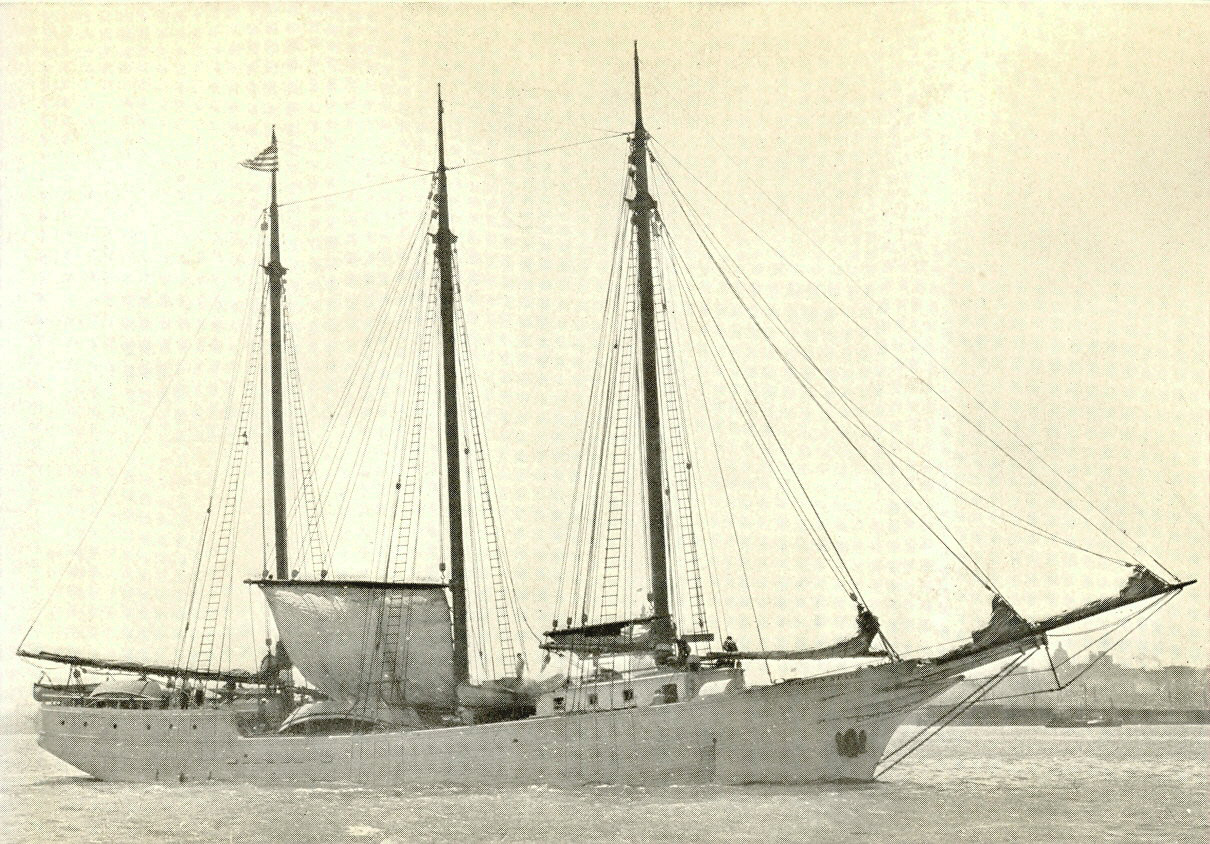
- Golden State

History

United States
- Builder: W.F. Stone, Oakland, California

General characteristics
- Type: Schooner
- Tons burthen: 353 tons
- Length: 140 ft.
- Propulsion: Union 150 hp open cross head

Golden State was a 3-masted schooner built in the W.F. Stone yard in Oakland, California in 1913.

She embarked on a fishing expedition from San Francisco to the Bering Sea in 1936.

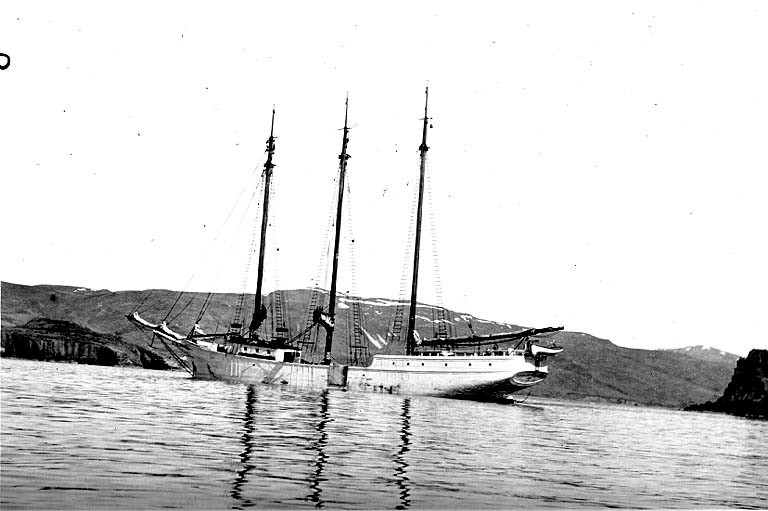
Golden State at Unga, Alaska, photo by John Nathan Cobb, undated

Golden State was laid up in Long Beach, California, in 1937 after being used in movies. She was sold in Costa Rica in 1943.

== Earlier 19th-century schooner ==
The schooner "'Golden State,' of San Francisco" was involved in the 1858 lawsuit Wetherbee vs. Schooner "Golden State" (and Captain W. S. Tuttle).
