= Stone Boat Yard =

Shipyard in Alameda, California, United States

Coordinates: 37.769854°N 122.23415°W

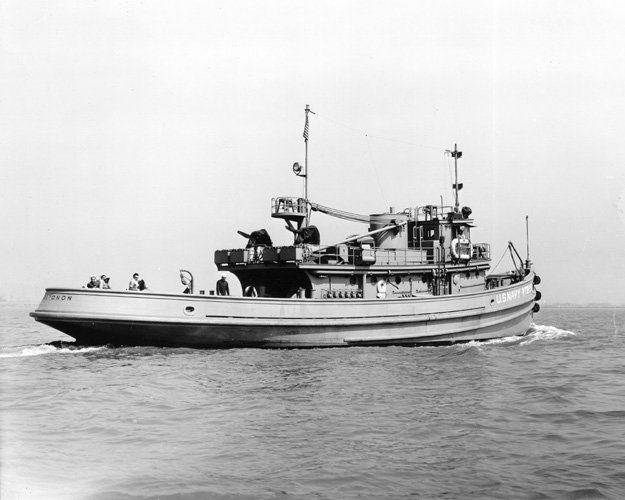
YT 254, Menatonon (YTB-254) tugboat built by Stone Boat Yard in 1944

W. F. Stone & Son in 1917, on Dennison Street, Oakland building four wooden ships; the three ships are the 117-foot (36 m) schooners Mauno, Motau and Murua for Burmes-Philip Co.

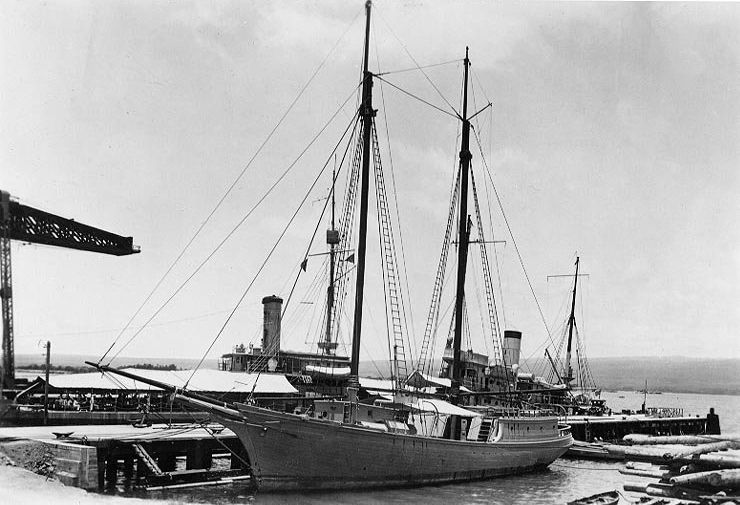
W. F. Stone & Son USS Lanikai at Pearl Harbor, in 1918, as the USS Hermes

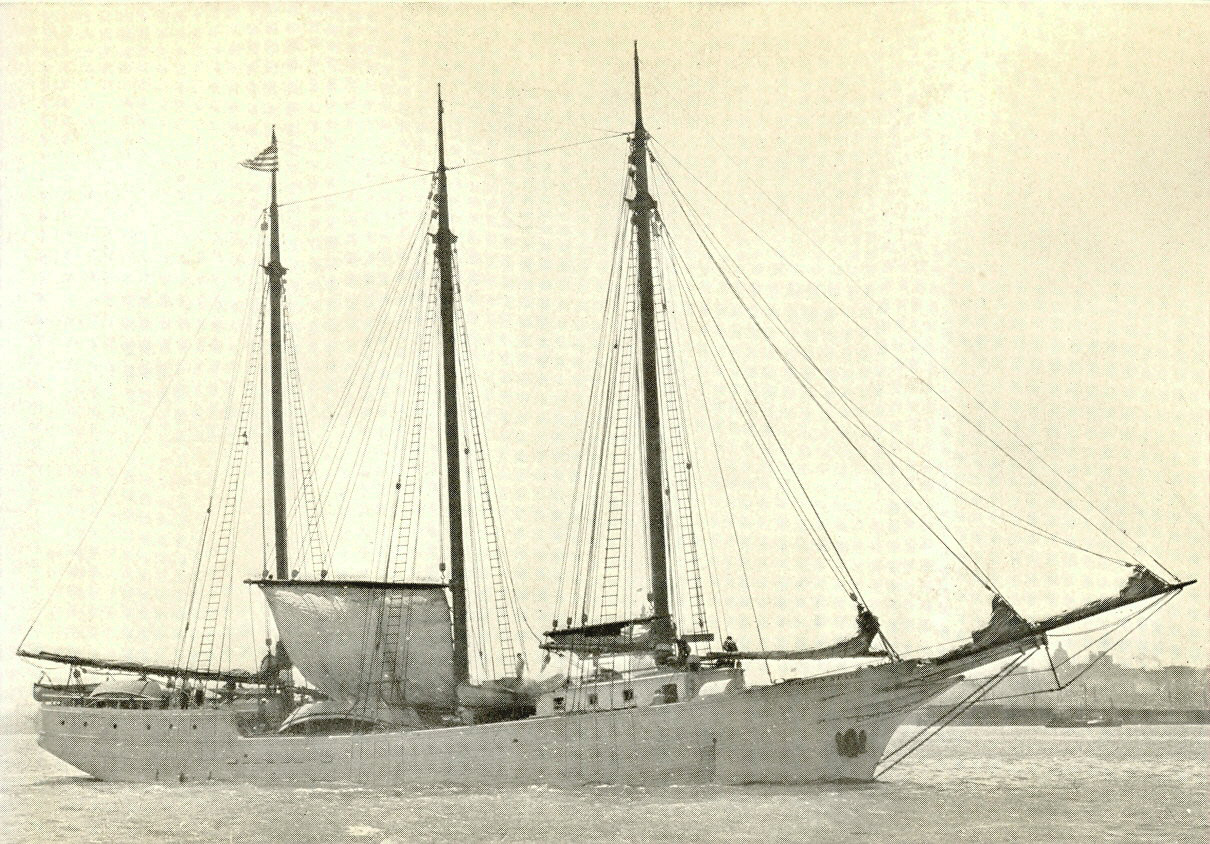
The schooner Golden State built in 1913

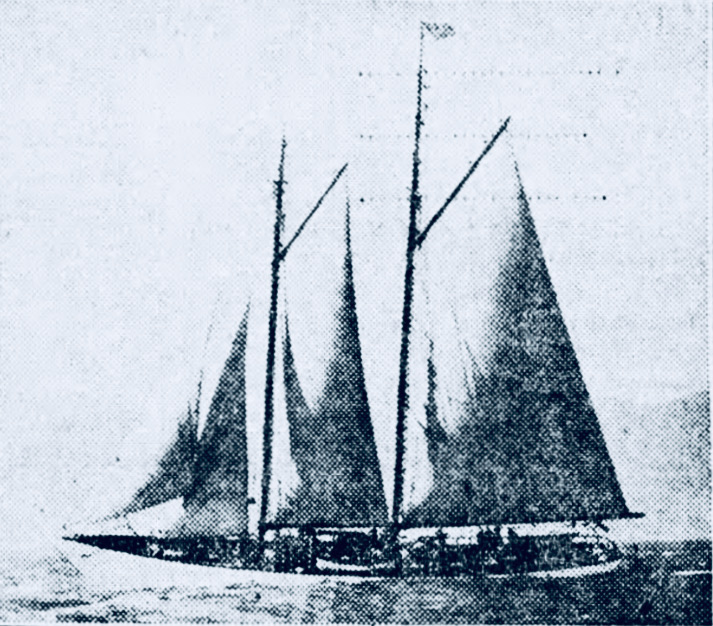
The Northern Light en route to Arctic on April 30, 1927

W. F. Stone & Son or Stone Boat Yard was a small wooden shipbuilding company in Alameda, California. To support the World War 2 demand for ships W. F. Stone & Son built tugboats, sub chasers and minesweepers. For World War 1 the shipyard, then called W. F. Stone & Son at Kennedy and Bocimer Streets, built tugboats for postwar work in 1921. The shipyard was opened in 1853 by William F. Stone (W. F. Stone), from Dartmouth, England, at the Hunter's Point in San Francisco Bay, near the current Hunters Point Naval Shipyard. In 1892 William Stone's son, Frank, ran the company and moved the shipyard to Tiburon. In 1899 he moved the shipyard again to Harbor View, San Francisco. In 1911, he again moved to Diesel Way, in Oakland, near Union Point Park on the Tidal Canal. When Lester Stone, Frank's son, became a partner, the company was changed to W. F. Stone & Son. In 1923, Frank Stone died, Lester Stone continued the company. In 1942 the company moved again, to 2517 Blanding Ave, Alameda on the south side of the Tidal Canal. In 1970 Lester Stone retired and sold the shipyard to John Whitset. Whitset, who did not rename the company, the company went into bankruptcy in 1986. It came out of bankruptcy and was sold to Bill and Grace Bodle. Bodle sold the company in 2000 to David Olson. The shipyard closed in 2004. For most of its history, the shipyard built a large variety of schooners, fishing boats, cargo ships, tugboats, sailboats, racing and recreational yachts.

== Notable ships ==
Notable ships include:

- USS Lanikai was a 1914 209-ton, 95-foot (29 m), schooner-rigged, diesel-powered yacht used by the US Navy for World War I and World War II, she was then transferred to the Royal Australian Navy. She sank in Subic Bay in 1947 during a typhoon.
- The schooner Golden State built in 1913 at 354 tons, was 140 feet (43 m) long, and was used in 1930s and 1940s movies in Long Beach, California. Sold to Costa Rica in 1943.
- Northern Light a 247-ton, 140-foot yacht built for John Borden, a Chicago banker. On April 21, 1927, Borden, his wife and crew took the Northern Light on an expedition to the Arctic on behalf of the Field Museum of Chicago. Borden's wife wrote a book about the Arctic expedition, The Cruise of the Northern Light. released in December 1928.

== World War 2 ==
World War 2 ships built for the US Navy:

Name	Type	Tons	Delivered	Notes
YMS-299	Minesweeper	278	7 April 1943	Reclassified in 1947 as Rhea (AMS 52). Sold in 1960 as training ship in Port Stanley Ontario, scrapped in 1997. Was part of the Battle of Okinawa.
YMS 300	Minesweeper	278	3 July 1943	US Navy struck in 1946
YMS 301	Minesweeper	278	11 September 1943	To the USSR 1945 as T-605, scrapped in 1956
YMS 302	Minesweeper	278	5 November 1943	US Navy struck in 1948
PCS 1421	Sub chaser	278	19 February 1944	Sold in 1947
PCS 1422	Sub chaser	278	24 April 1944	Sold in 1947
YT 254	Tug	260	24 August 1944	Renamed to Menatonon, struck 1960
YT 255	Tug	260	30 September 1944	Renamed to Kennesaw, struck 1960

- YMS-299, YMS-300 and YMS-301 were YMS-1-class minesweeper of the YMS-135 subclasss built for the US Navy to remove naval mines that had been placed in the water to prevent ships from passing. They were armed with one 40 mm gun mount, two 20 mm guns, machine guns, and two depth charge racks.
- PCS 1421 and PCS 1422 were 245 tons light and 338 tons full, had a length of 136 feet (41 m), a beam of 24 feet (7.3 m), a draft of 8 feet (2.4 m), a top speed of 14.1 knots (26.1 km/h; 16.2 mph) and a crew of 57. They were armed with one 3"/50 caliber gun, one 20 mm anti-air (AA) gun, four depth charge projectors, one depth charge Hedgehog projector, and two depth charge tracks. Power was from two 800-brake-horsepower (600 kW) General Motors 8-268A diesel engines to a Snow and Knobstedt single reduction gear to two shafts.
- YT 254 and YT 255 were District Harbor Tug, Large. The tugs were 410 tons, with a length of 110 feet (34 m), a beam of 27 feet (8.2 m), a draft of 11 feet (3.4 m), a top speed 12 knots (22 km/h; 14 mph) and a crew of 12. They were armed with two .50 cal. machine guns. Power was one diesel engine and a single propeller creating 1,000 shaft horsepower (750 kW).

== See also ==
- California during World War II
- Maritime history of California
- Wooden boats of World War 2
