= First Corps of Cadets =

The First Corps of Cadets of Massachusetts formed in 1741. Its motto is Monstrat Viam - "It Points the Way." While it has served in several wars, the sub-unit's primary contribution to Massachusetts and to the United States was as an officer-producing institution for new regiments from the Revolutionary War through World War II.

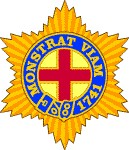
First Corps of Cadets Distinctive Unit Insignia

== History ==
=== Early period ===
Unlike the oldest regiments of the Massachusetts National Guard, which began as standing militia made up of all able-bodied men between the ages of 16 and 60, the First Corps of Cadets, the Commonwealth's and the National Guard's oldest volunteer militia unit, has always consisted of young men, and now women, who volunteered to serve.

The origin of the Corps can be traced to July 1726 when an organization called the "Company of Young Gentlemen Cadets" escorted the new royal governor of Massachusetts upon his arrival in Boston. Commanded by Benjamin Pollard, this predecessor organization of 24 young men provided their own weapons and uniforms. The "Young Gentlemen Cadets" had no formal military status and went out of existence within several years.

Benjamin Pollard apparently was keen on organizing a volunteer militia company made up of young Boston gentlemen who had the time and the money to devote to ceremonial duties. However, it was not until 1741 that such a company was chartered as the Independent Cadets.. The mission of the Independent Cadets was to serve as the ceremonial bodyguard for the royal governors of Massachusetts. On 16 October 1741 Governor William Shirley commissioned Pollard as Captain and Commander of the Independent Company of Cadets to consist of "sixty-four young Gentlemen." The Company was organized on 19 October.

Pollard was given dual rank; he was captain of the Cadets but was also accorded the rank of lieutenant colonel of militia. His two lieutenants were ranked as major and captain of militia respectively. The privilege of dual rank was a custom adopted from the three Guards regiments of the British Army. Guard officers held regimental rank and Army rank, which was two grades higher. As the personal bodyguard of the Massachusetts royal governor, Cadet officers were accorded the privilege of dual rank until 1874. Benjamin Pollard was one of the leading citizens of Boston; he had served in the Ancient and Honorable Artillery Company of Boston, and was sheriff of Suffolk County. Under Lieutenant Colonel Pollard's leadership the Cadets immediately became the elite unit of the Massachusetts Militia.

In order to join prospective Cadets had to be nominated by a member and had to be able to afford to purchase their uniform as well as pay dues for the upkeep of the Company. Unit dues were collected until 1940. These requirements limited membership to a select few.

The Cadets escorted the governor at parades and ceremonies. Once a year the governor reviewed the Cadets, usually at the parade honoring the king's birthday. In 1766, John Hancock, the Cadet's most famous alumnus, joined. Hancock later served as President of the Continental Congress, signer of the Declaration of Independence and governor of Massachusetts.

By 1772 Hancock was Commander and had a role in selecting a new uniform which consisted of a red coat with buff facings. The uniform was similar to that worn by British Guards regiments. The uniform indicated the Cadets' special status in the militia. Since Hancock was one of the richest men in Boston, he could afford to purchase new uniforms, drums and other accouterments. Hancock, one of the leaders of the revolt against British import duties, did not get along with the new royal governor, Lieutenant General Sir Thomas Gage, who came to Boston with orders to impose harsh measures in the aftermath of the Boston Tea Party. Shortly after arriving in Boston in May 1774, as was the custom, Gage presented new colors to the Cadets. As relations grew worse between patriot leaders and British officials, so did relations between Hancock and Gage.

On 1 August 1774, Lieutenant Colonel Hancock was dismissed as commander of the Cadets by Lieutenant General Gage. Since it was the custom of the Cadets to elect their own officers, the Cadets were outraged by the governor's action. The Cadets, several of whom had participated in the Boston Tea Party, met on 15 August and voted to disband and to return their colors to the governor in protest against the dismissal of their popular commander. The Cadets turned in their uniforms and musical instruments to Hancock for safekeeping.

As a result of their disbandment, the Cadets saw no action in the Lexington and Boston campaigns of 1775. While a few slipped out of Boston to join the American forces, most former Cadets could not join the American cause until the British evacuated Boston in March 1776. Sometime in the late spring or early summer of 1776 the Cadets reorganized as the Independent Company of Cadets. Since red uniforms were no longer appropriate, a black coat with red facings was adopted.

The first parade was held on Boston Common on 9 September. Hancock, now President of the Continental Congress, was elected honorary colonel while Henry Jackson was elected captain. The strength of the company stood at 78. The Cadets wanted to take an active part in the Revolutionary War and petitioned the General Court for authority to raise a battalion for the Continental Army. Shortly thereafter, Capt. Jackson was commissioned as colonel and commander of Jackson's Additional Continental Regiment on 12 January 1777.

The Cadets provided the officer cadre for the new regiment, which organized in the spring of 1777. Jackson's Regiment fought at the Battle of Monmouth on 28 June 1778 and later took part in campaigns in New Jersey and Rhode Island. The regiment was disbanded near West Point, New York on 31 December 1780. Because the Cadets were always made up of young men of officer material, the First Corps of Cadets began its tradition and secondary mission of providing officers for wartime regiments in 1777. This secondary mission continued through World War II (1941–1945). In the 1920s the War Department awarded the Corps three campaign streamers earned by Jackson's Regiment. In 1976 the Department of the Army awarded two additional Revolutionary War streamers.

While many of its members were serving on active duty, the Cadets were mobilized for active service in April 1777 and marched to Rhode Island The Cadets entered active duty again in the spring of 1778 serving as a garrison at Dorchester Heights. The Cadets served under their former commander in July and August 1778, when Maj. Gen. Hancock commanded the Massachusetts Militia in a brief campaign against the British in Rhode Island Serving in the same campaign was the Cadets' offspring Jackson's Regiment. After their third tour of active duty, the Cadets were inactive unit 1785. In August 1786, the Cadets reorganized with 36 members. A white uniform was adopted in honor of a French Army regiment with which the Cadets served in Rhode Island in 1778.

On 19 October 1786, the Cadets were formally reorganized as the Independent Company of Cadets and were given special privileges by the General Court of Massachusetts. The Cadets were accorded the honor of continuing to serve as the governor's official bodyguard; the Cadets were to be assigned to a headquarters commanded by a major general; and were to be commanded by a lieutenant colonel. These special privileges were recognized by the federal government under the Militia Acts of 1792 and 1903 and by the National Defense Acts of 1916 and 1920 and today by Title 32 of the US Code. At their reorganization parade on 19 October Governor James Bowdoin presented the Cadets with new colors. The color consisted of a sunburst star and the motto Monstrat Viam. The sunburst star was designed as a variation of the insignia of the Coldstream Guards of the British Army, and, with the motto, has been worn on the uniforms, accouterments, drums and colors of the Cadets to the present day.

Within days of reorganization, the Cadets mobilized for state service during Shays' Rebellion. The Cadets marched to Groton to assist the sheriff in enforcing state law.

Because the Cadets were originally organized on 19 October 1741 and reorganized on 19 October 1786, in addition to being its Organization Day, for many years it was the custom to present the officers with their commissions on October 19. The Cadets attracted young Boston gentlemen with the time and means to join. While they drilled on a regular basis and participated in parades and ceremonies, the Cadets social side was just as important.

Throughout its history, the Cadets have provided honor guards for distinguished visitors to Boston. In October 1789, the Cadets escorted President George Washington during his first visit to Boston as president. The Cadets escorted President Washington again in 1793 and President John Adams in 1797.

=== Quasi-War with France ===
During the Quasi- War with France in 1797, the Cadets voted to offer their services as part of the Volunteer Army. As the standing militia, which under the Militia Act of 1792, required all males from 17-45 to belong to the militia waned as its value as a military force became less effective the volunteer militia took its place. Volunteer militia units were uniformed, equipped, and drilled on a regular basis. In 1840 Massachusetts abolished the standing militia and replaced it with regiments of the Massachusetts Volunteer Militia. From 1842 to 1844 the core was commanded by Colonel William P. Winchester.

During the early 19th century, a number of volunteer units were organized in Boston. The National Lancers, organized in 1836, was designated as the governor's mounted bodyguard. Other elite units such as the Boston Fusilers and the New England Guards were organized as well. The Cadets began a friendly competition with these units. In 1786, the Cadets sister unit, the Second Corps of Cadets of Salem was organized. The First and Second Corps of Cadets were both accorded special privileges as the leading units of the volunteer militia.

The period between 1815 and 1860 was the heyday of the volunteer militia movement. Every town and city had several companies that proudly paraded in their often ornate uniforms. The Cadets frequently changed their uniforms in order to be the most splendidly clad unit in Boston. Between 1810 and 1860, the uniform changed from white with red facings to black with red facings, back to white and then grey in several variations and hues. Because of the heavy expense associated with purchasing new uniforms only wealthy young men could afford to join the Cadets.

As often as the uniforms changed so did the designation of the Cadets. Between 1801 and 1861 the Cadets alternately designated themselves the Boston Independent Cadets, Company of Independent Cadets, Divisionary Company of Cadets and Independent Company of Cadets and some six other variations of these designations.

The Cadets, like other volunteer militia units, began attending summer training sessions lasting several days. The Cadets also observed their organization day with a parade on Boston Common in addition to parades on Independence Day, Patriot's Day and other civic holidays. The Cadets often escorted the governor to Harvard commencements. This was appropriate since the Cadets always had a large number of Harvard graduates in their ranks from the colonial days up to World War II. Since the Cadets were organized as an infantry company, a state law passed in February 1861 restricted their strength to 100.

=== The Civil War ===
With the outbreak of the Civil War in April 1861, the Cadets reoriented their training and concern with uniforms and parades to war service. The Cadets volunteered for state service in May and were assigned to guard the state house and state arsenal. While the Massachusetts Volunteer Militia furnished five regiments as the state's quota under President Lincoln's call for militia, because the Cadets were an independent infantry company they were not assigned to a regiment.

Because the command was always made up of well educated and intelligent young men, the Cadets lived up to their designation by providing officers for the new three-year volunteer regiments organized by the state. Just as the Cadets had provided the officers for Jackson's Regiment in 1777, in 1861 they furnished officers for the 2d, 20th and 24th Massachusetts Volunteer Infantry Regiments as well as for other organizations. Some 170 Cadets were commissioned as officers, five of whom attained the rank of brigadier general.

The Cadets provided most of the officers for the 2d Massachusetts organized in May 1861. Cadets George Gordon and George Andrews, both graduates of West Point, were commissioned as colonel and lieutenant colonel of the 2d. Andrews later served as commander as did Cadet Samuel Quincy. The 2d was called "the best officered regiment in the entire Army." Every officer was carefully selected because it was the first three-year regiment organized by the state.

The year 1862 was an extremely busy year for the Corps. On 26 May, for the first time in its history, the Corps entered federal service. The Cadets reported to Fort Warren in Boston Harbor where they guarded Confederate prisoners. The Cadets still wore the standard peacetime grey field uniform of the Massachusetts Volunteer Militia. While in federal service the Corps was issued the standard blue army uniform. The Corps was released from federal service on 2 July 1862.

President Lincoln called on the states to furnish militia regiments for nine months service as immediate reinforcements for the Army. The Corps was given the challenge of organizing the 45th Massachusetts Volunteer Infantry Regiment. The Corps provided most of the officers and NCOs for the 45th. The "Cadet Regiment," as the 45th was known, mustered into Federal service on 26 September 1862. The 45th's mission was to reinforce the Union occupation of the North Carolina coast.

The 45th arrived in North Carolina in early November and camped near Newbern. The regiment went into action at Kinston on 14 December and at Goldsboro two days later. The 45th took part in several minor actions in April 1863. With its term of service over, the 45th mustered out of service on 8 July. For its service in the 45th, the Corps was awarded two campaign streamers; North Carolina 1862 and North Carolina 1863 which are now displayed on the Corps' colors. However, the 45th's service was not over. The commander was ordered to reorganize his regiment for state service on 14 July to restore order in Boston during the draft riots. The 45th did not hesitate in imposing order on the streets of Boston.

During the service of the 45th, the Corps, minus most of its members, remained in state service as a home guard unit. The Corps, in effect, performed two missions during the Civil War: it provided officers for new units while older Cadets remained in Boston for state service. This opportunity came in July 1863. Wearing blue uniforms, since the traditional grey was inappropriate, the Cadets were ordered to guard the governor and the state capitol during the draft riots. Serving nearby at Faneuil Hall, was their offspring the 45th Regiment.

=== The Post - Civil War Era ===
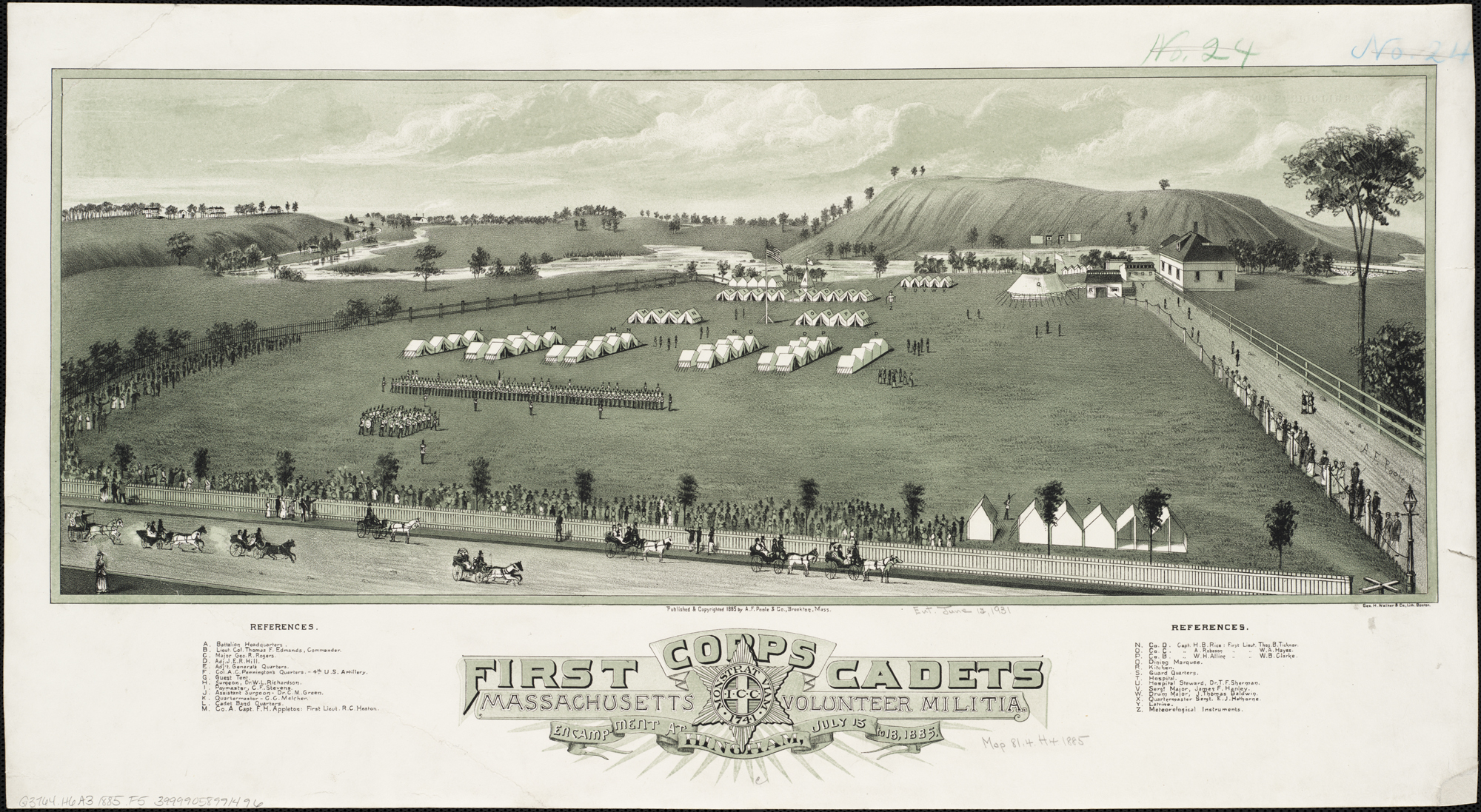
The Corp encamped at Hingham, Massachusetts, 1885

There was a general decline of interest in military affairs after the Civil War. Unlike many other volunteer militia units, the Corps did not go out of existence but membership dropped to 60 and the Corps' activities were at a low ebb. However, the Corps began to reenergize. A new full dress uniform was adopted in 1868 consisting of a white tunic, sky-blue trousers and a black shako. White was the traditional color of full dress while sky-blue was the traditional color of the infantry. This uniform, still the official Corps full dress uniform, was purposely simple in order to keep costs down for new members. While previous uniforms had been influenced by British and French military fashion, this full dress was based on uniforms worn by the Austrian Army.

The Corps began recruiting to full strength; because the cost of membership had been rather high in the past, with uniforms and dues at a reasonable level, the Corps began attracting young businessmen. In November 1872, the Corps helped police the city after a devastating fire. In July 1873 Lt. Col. Thomas F. Edmands was elected to command the Corps. Edmands Commanded the Corps for 33 years. Under his leadership, the Corps thrived and once again became the premier militia unit in Massachusetts. As a veteran of the Civil War, he knew firsthand that the Corps had to be proficient infantry unit. The Corps was both a well-drilled parade unit and an infantry battalion prepared for field service. In 1874, the Cadets were finally designated as the First Corps of Cadets and expanded into a battalion. The special privilege of dual rank ended as the officers assumed their higher rank with the battalion organization.

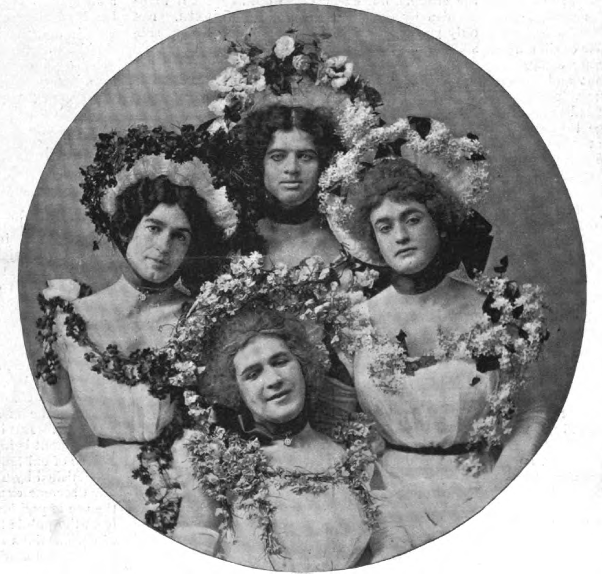
Members of the Boston Cadets performing as the "Jollity Theatre Ballet," 1898

The Veteran Association of the First Corps of Cadets was formed in 1876 to help raise funds for a new armory. Over the years, the Veteran Association has played an important role in maintaining the history and traditions of the Corps. As the elite militia unit of Boston, the Corps needed a suitable armory for its activities. During the late 19th century, there was a movement to build large medieval fortress-looking armories for the National Guard These imposing buildings were meant to show that the National Guard was ready to enforce civil peace. The funds to build these large and often ornate armories were raised by National Guard units.

In 1878 the Corps began to raise funds for its armory. The Corps raised half the funds necessary to build the armory through public subscription. The rest of the money was raised by Corps-sponsored operettas, which proved immensely popular in Boston. The armory cornerstone was laid in 1891 with construction completed in 1897. The Armory of the First Corps of Cadets is an imposing and impressive building located at the intersection of Arlington Street and Columbus Avenue in Boston. It was designated as a Boston Landmark by the Boston Landmarks Commission in 1977. During the Spanish–American War in 1898 the Corps was not mobilized for federal service since only full regiments of infantry were called. Instead, the Corps guarded coastal artillery installations on the North and South Shores.

=== World War I (1914–1918) ===
With the reform of the National Guard beginning in 1903, the Corps focused on infantry training first, but also continued its social activities and parades as well. The Corps performed state duty after the Chelsea fire in 1906 and the Salem fire in 1914. In 1912 the Corps served for several weeks during the textile workers' strike in Lawrence. The Corps purchased their own machine guns and automobiles in an early experiment as motorized infantry.

The Corps realized that it could not continue as a separate infantry battalion. Because it was not a standard Table of Organization unit, the Corps was not called for service on the Mexican border in 1916. The 275-man unit thus played no role in the crisis on the border. During the winter of 1916-1917, the Corps discussed its future role since it was told that there were no plans to include it in the new 26th Division being formed for war service. During the early part of 1916 the Corps continued its mission of training potential officers by sponsoring classes for enlisted men and civilians who later attended training sessions at Plattsburgh Barracks, NY.

After the United States entered World War I in 1917, the Corps decided to convert to engineers when it was allowed to fill the requirement for the engineer regiment for the 26th Division, and on 22 May was redesignated as the 1st Regiment of Engineers (First Corps of Cadets), Massachusetts National Guard. The Corps reorganized as a regiment with many of its members becoming the officers and NCOs of the new organization. They immediately began recruiting to the regiment's authorized strength of 1,634. The 1st Engineers mustered into federal service on 20 June 1917 and began training in the Armory and at Wentworth Institute.

With the entire Massachusetts National Guard in federal service, the state had to create a home guard organization for state duty. The Veteran Association organized the First Motor Corps as its contribution to the Massachusetts State Guard. The First Motor Corps was accepted for state service on 5 June 1917.

Meanwhile, the Corps, as a new engineer regiment, began training to the best of its ability. In order to bring it up to strength, the 6th Massachusetts Infantry transferred 82 men, the 1st Maine Field Artillery transferred 100 men, and 479 Coast Artillery men from the Maine, New Hampshire and Rhode Island National Guards brought the Corps up to full strength.

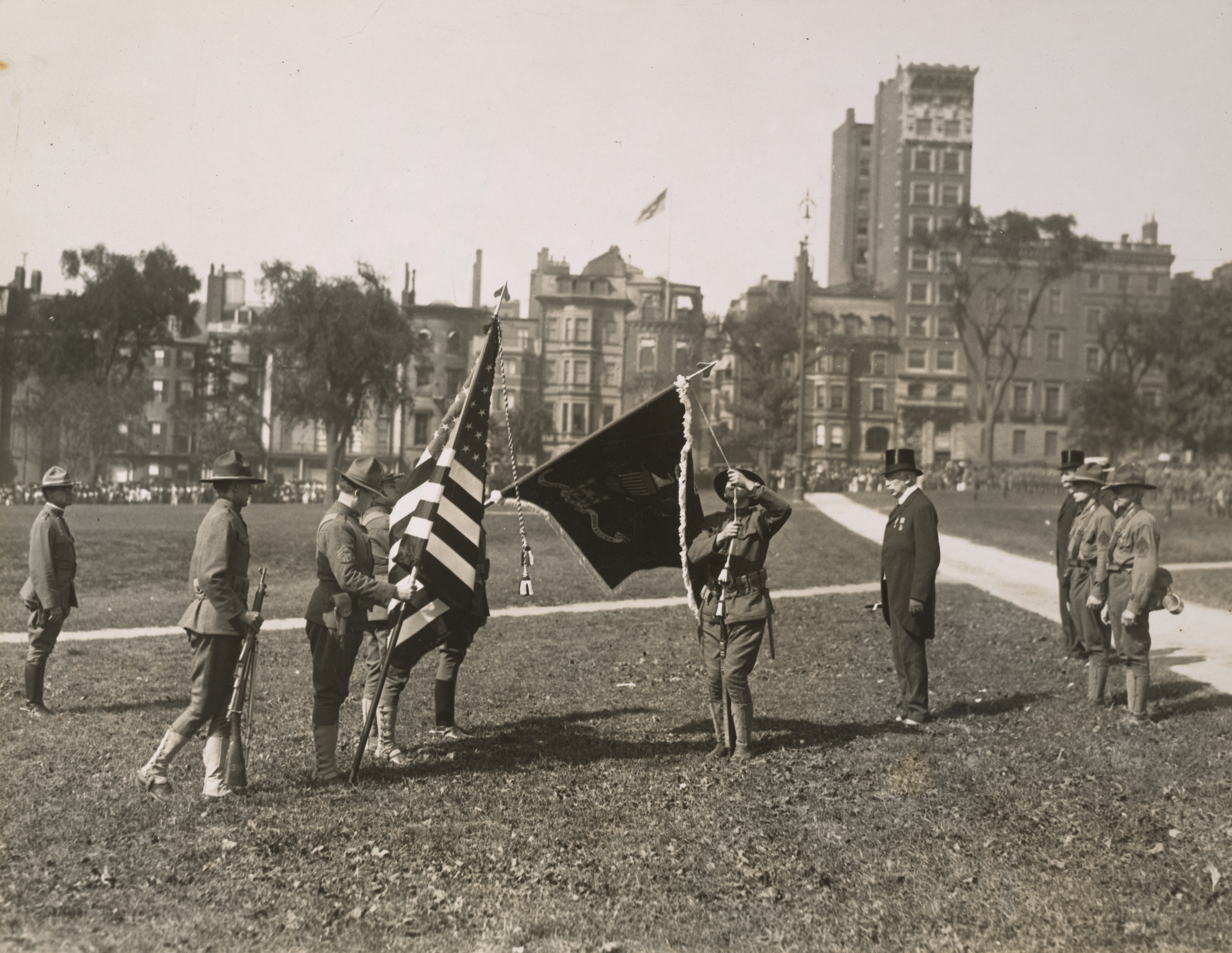
Cadet veterans present colors to 101st Engineers on Boston Common, 14 September 1917.

On 18 August, the Corps was officially redesignated as the 101st Engineers, 26th Division. On 15 September on the Common, the entire regiment paraded for the first time and was presented with a stand of new colors.

The 26th was the first National Guard division and the second US Army division to deploy overseas in World War I. The 101st Engineers arrived in France in October; the advance party landed on the 19th, the 176th anniversary of the Corps, which justified a celebration that evening. Engineer troops were in short supply, and the Corps immediately went to work building barracks and hospitals. The Corps went into the line in February 1918 in the Chemin des Dames sector in the province of Ile de France and supported the 26th Division by rebuilding trenches, dugouts, and roads. The Corps also suffered its first casualties of the Great War.

In late March 1918 the 101st moved into the Toul sector in Lorraine and supported the 26th by constructing pillboxes, building strong points, digging trenches, and rebuilding roads. In July, the 101st moved to Château Thierry where it worked despite heavy shelling. For several days, the 2d Battalion, 101st Engineers took the line as infantry. In September, the Corps moved to Saint-Mihiel where it worked nonstop rebuilding roads for the movement of artillery. When the armistice was signed on 11 November the Corps was still hard at work.

The 101st Engineers returned to Boston on 5 April 1919, and while preparing for demobilization at Camp Devens, took part in the farewell parade of the 26th Division on 25 April. Four days later the l0lst demobilized and was released from federal service. Four cadets were awarded the Distinguished Service Cross, the nation's second highest award; the l0lst was awarded six campaign streamers for its service in World War I.

While the First Corps of Cadets was in the process of reorganizing as a National Guard unit, its sister unit, the First Motor Corps was ordered into active state service in September 1919 acting as police during the Boston Police Strike. The First Motor Corps was released on 6 December and disbanded.

=== The Inter-War Years ===
The First Corps of Cadets was reorganized on 27 July 1921 as the 1st Separate Infantry Battalion. This was a temporary designation until the Massachusetts National Guard received its allotment of units. With this reorganization the Corps was no longer part of the 26th "Yankee" Division. In March 1922, the Corps became the 211th Machinegun Battalion, Coast Artillery Corps but in May 1923 was reorganized again as the 2d Battalion, 211th Artillery, Coast Artillery Corps and was federally recognized in April 1924.

== Alternate names ==
- 1741 - Governor's Company of Cadets (Provincial)
- 1776 - Independent Company (during Revolution)
- 1786 - Independent Company of Cadets
- 1799 - Independent Corps of Cadets
- 1803 - Independent Cadets
- 1840 - Divisionary Corps of Independent Cadets
- 1854 - Independent Company of Cadets
- 1861 - Independent Corps of Cadets
- 1866 - First Company of Cadets
- 1874 - First Corps of Cadets

== See also ==
- 211th Military Police Battalion, successor to the 1st Corps of Cadets, est. 1921
- Armory of the First Corps of Cadets, Boston
- Massachusetts Volunteer Militia
