= USS Rhea (AMS-52) =

Minesweeper of the United States Navy

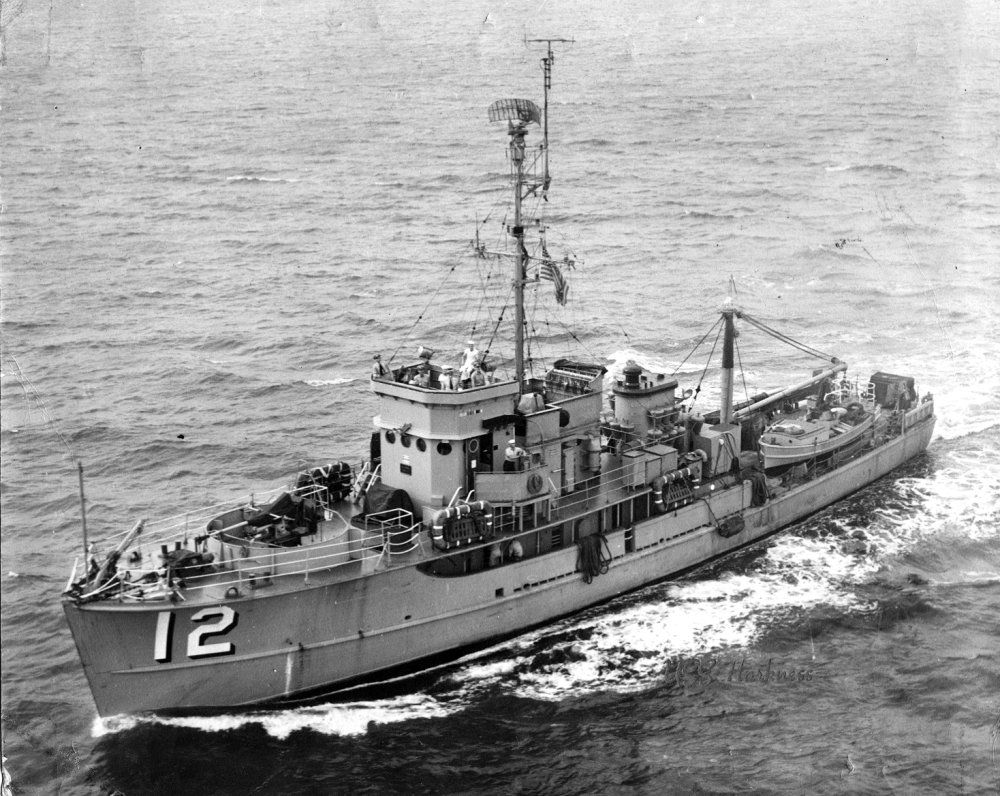
- A YMS-1-class minesweeper

History

United States
- Ordered: as YMS-299
- Builder: Stone Boat Yard
- Laid down: 5 June 1942
- Launched: 14 November 1942
- Commissioned: 7 April 1943
- Decommissioned: 6 March 1947
- In service: 6 March 1947
- Out of service: 23 December 1957
- Stricken: 1 November 1959
- Fate: Sold, June 1960; sank, 1997

General characteristics
- Displacement: 380 tons (f.)
- Length: 136 ft (41 m)
- Beam: 24 ft 6 in (7.47 m)
- Draft: 10 ft (3.0 m)
- Speed: 13 knots
- Complement: 29
- Armament: one 40 mm gun mount, two 20 mm machine guns, two depth charge racks, two depth charge tracks

USS Rhea (AMS-52/YMS-299) was a YMS-1-class minesweeper of the YMS-135 subclass acquired by the U.S. Navy for the task of removing mines that had been placed in the water to prevent ships from passing.

== History ==
The second ship to be named Rhea by the Navy was laid down as YMS-299 by William F. Stone & Sons Co., Oakland, California, 5 June 1942; launched 14 November 1942; and commissioned 7 April 1943.

Charles Paul served aboard in the US Navy. The crew had a pet monkey and a pet cat, the monkey would grab the cat's tail. Also the Pensacola towed the YMS-299 once at a speed that was too fast and the YMS-299 crew thought that it would be the end of them, but all went well!

Following shakedown, the YMS-299, a wooden hulled minesweeper, sailed west to Hawaii where she operated under Commander, Hawaiian Sea Frontier, until December 1943. Then proceeding further across the Pacific Ocean she steamed to Makin where, on 20 December, she was damaged while sweeping the approaches to Butaritari. Ordered first to Tarawa, then to Funafuti for repairs, she returned to Makin toward the end of February. In April she shifted to Kwajalein, thence to Majuro in May. Through the summer, she conducted ASW patrols and provided escort services in the Marshall Islands and, in early October, returned to the Gilbert Islands en route to Pearl Harbor and an overhaul.

Heading west again in late February 1945 YMS-299 arrived off Okinawa on 1 April. An element of task unit TU 52.7.2 she remained in the area until July, sweeping the approaches to the Hagushi beaches, to the Kerama Retto anchorage, and to Buckner Bay. Then sailing south, she performed sweeping and patrol operations in the Philippines. In September she departed Tacloban, arriving off Okinawa on the 5th. She then commenced sweeping operations in the East China Sea amongst the Ryūkyūs and off the southern Japanese home islands. In November she shifted her base to Sasebo and in early February 1946 to Pusan, Korea. Returning to Japan at midmonth, she got underway for Saipan on the 24th and from there continued eastward and arrived at San Francisco, California, 15 April.

YMS-299 remained at San Francisco, California, until 27 May 1946 when she got underway for the U.S. East Coast and U.S. Naval Reserve training duty with the 4th Naval District. Arriving at Philadelphia, Pennsylvania, 24 July she was converted to a training ship and on 6 March 1947 was placed in service in reserve. On 2 April she shifted to Camden, New Jersey, to take up her training duties. Named Rhea and reclassified AMS-52, 1 September 1947, she trained naval reservists of the 4th Naval District until ordered recommissioned 15 November 1950. Extensive overhaul followed and Rhea was again equipped as a minesweeper.

Detached from the 4th Naval District in June 1952 Rhea headed south to her new homeport, Charleston, South Carolina. Assigned in turn to MinDivs 44, 45, and 46, she conducted local exercises off the southeastern seaboard and participated in training operations in the Caribbean until she was assigned schoolship duties for the Mine Warfare School at Yorktown, Virginia, in January 1955. Reclassified MSC(O)-52 in February, she continued schoolship duties until April 1956, then resumed operations out of Charleston. In late October 1957 Rhea departed Charleston and steamed north to New London, Connecticut.

Arriving on the 31st, she was placed in reserve 1 November and decommissioned 23 December. She remained in the Reserve Fleet until struck from the Navy List on 1 November 1959 and sold to the Ships, Engines, & Equipment Co. in June 1960.

The YMS-299 was last minesweeper owned by a fisherman.

== Awards and honors ==
YMS-299 earned three battle stars during World War II.
