= Winchester Town Hall (Massachusetts) =

- U.S. National Register of Historic Places
- U.S. Historic district – Contributing property
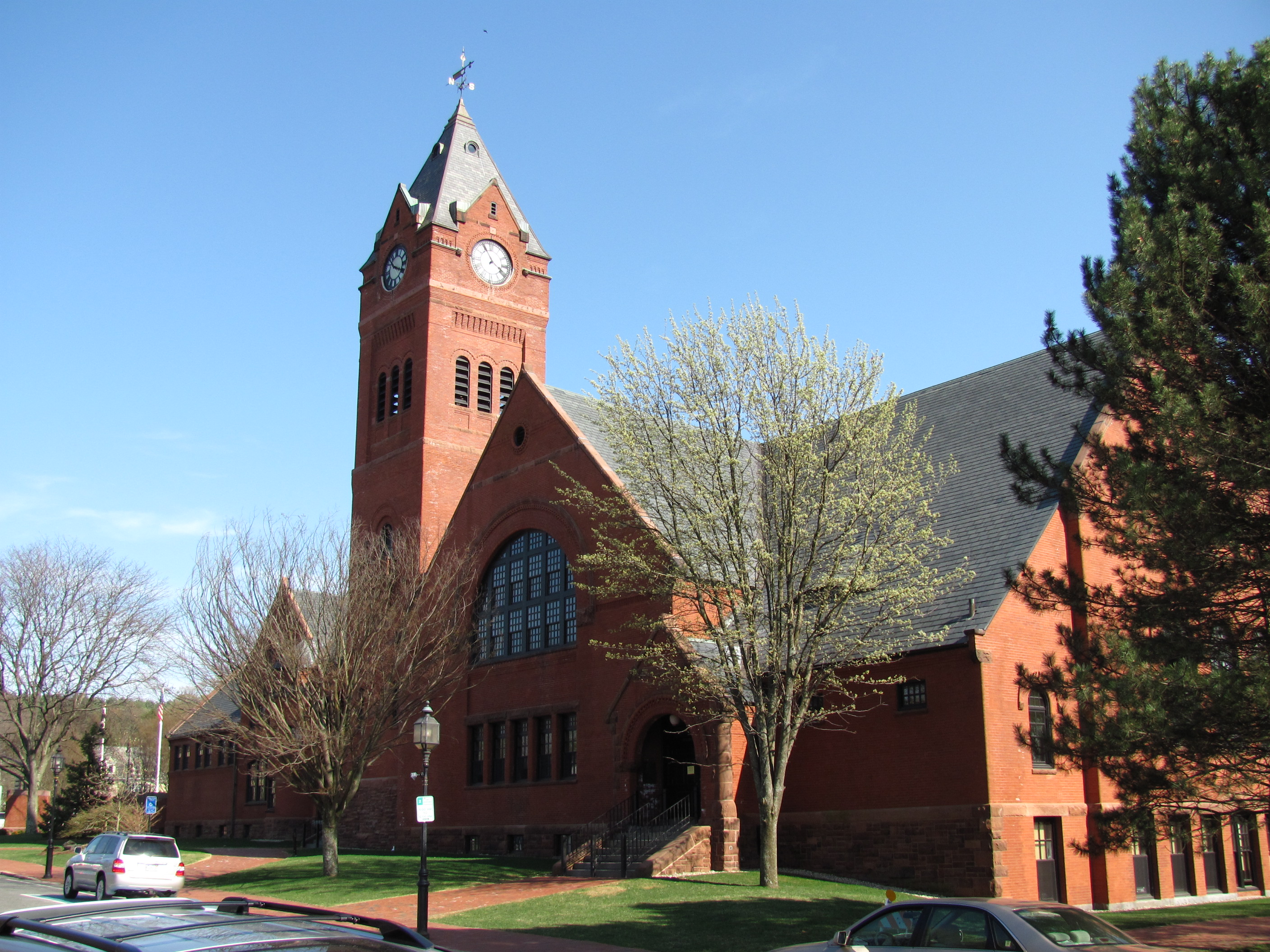
- Town Hall

- Location within Massachusetts Location within the United States
- Location: Winchester, Massachusetts
- Coordinates: 42°27′9″N 71°8′6″W
- Built: 1887
- Architect: Rand & Taylor
- Architectural style: Queen Anne, Romanesque
- Part of: Winchester Center Historic District (ID86002943)
- NRHP reference No.: 83000837

Significant dates
- Added to NRHP: March 31, 1983
- Designated CP: November 21, 1986

Winchester Town Hall is a historic town hall at 71 Mount Vernon Street in Winchester, Massachusetts. The 2 1/2-story brick building was built in 1887 to a design by Rand and Taylor. It was funded in part by a bequest from William Parsons Winchester, for whom the town is named. Stylistically the building has Queen Anne and Romanesque Revival styling. Its most prominent feature is the clock tower, a four-plus story square tower topped by a pointed roof with gables.

The building was listed on the National Register of Historic Places in 1983, and included in the Winchester Center Historic District in 1986.

== See also ==
- National Register of Historic Places listings in Winchester, Massachusetts
