= William P. Winchester =

American colonel

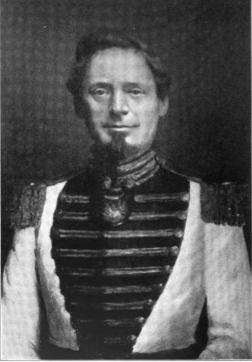
- Col. William P. Winchester (from a painting as Colonel of Cadets of Boston, Mass.)
- Born: November 9, 1801; Boston, Massachusetts, US
- Died: August 6, 1850 (aged 48); Watertown, Massachusetts, US
- Occupation: Boston merchant
- Spouse: Eliza Gill Bradlee
- Children: 7

William Parsons Winchester (9 November 1801 – 5 August 1850) was an American colonel and wholesale merchant. The rank of Colonel was earned through his participation in the First Corps of Cadets, the organization originally formed as the bodyguard of the governor of Massachusetts. He commanded the corps from October 1842 to August 1844. Winchester was an avid yachtsman who owned the racing yachts Mermaid and Northern Light. He was a wealthy businessman for whom the town of Winchester, Massachusetts was named in 1849 following a gift of $3,000 towards the construction of the town hall.

== Early life ==
Winchester was born in Boston, Massachusetts to Edmund Winchester (1772-1839) and Prudence Skillings (1770-1834). Winchester took the middle name Parsons in 1823 to distinguish himself from another prominent William Winchester of Boston. He married Eliza Gill Bradlee on 17 October 1822 in Boston. They had seven children.

== Career ==
Known for his sharp business sense and outgoing personality, Winchester was socially popular and a generous patron of the arts.

In 1821, his father's firm expanded with the addition his son William, to become E. A. and W. Winchester of Boston. They were wholesale merchants and soap manufactures. In 1839 upon his father's death Col. Winchester took over as head of the family wholesale business which was also a provisioner for the U.S. Navy. He also held the position of a director of the Boston Exchange Company and the Merchants Bank of Boston.

In October 1842, Winchester became Lieutenant colonel through his participation in the First Corps of Cadets, the organization originally formed as the bodyguard of the governor of Massachusetts in 1726. He commanded the corps from October 1842 to August 1844. The Corps presented Winchester with a silver pitcher and salver and commissioned a piece of music, Winchester’s Quick Step, which was performed in an 1843 parade and on his return from Europe in July 1844.

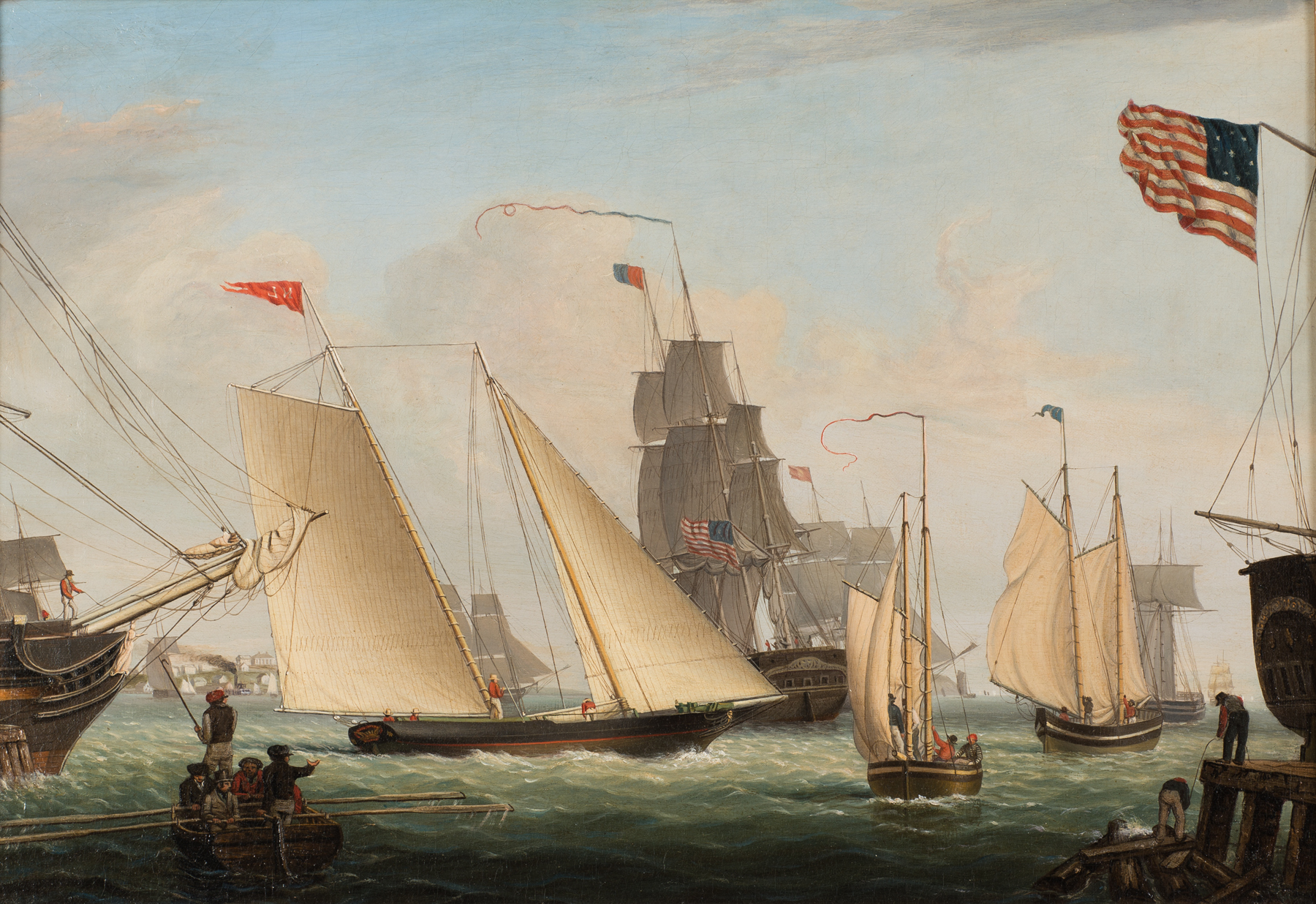
Northern Light yacht

An avid yachtsman Winchester owned the racing yachts Mermaid that was bought from Benjamin C. Clark in 1836; and the Northern Light. The Boston yacht Northern Light was built in 1839 at the Whitemore & Holbrook shipyard for Col. Winchester. He commissioned Louis Winde, an early yacht designer and shipbuilder, to design and build the model for the yacht. His unique design was later used by George Steers. Her dimensions were, 47.6 feet Length of keel, beam was 17.6 feet, depth was 7.3 feet, and she was 70-tons.

== Death ==
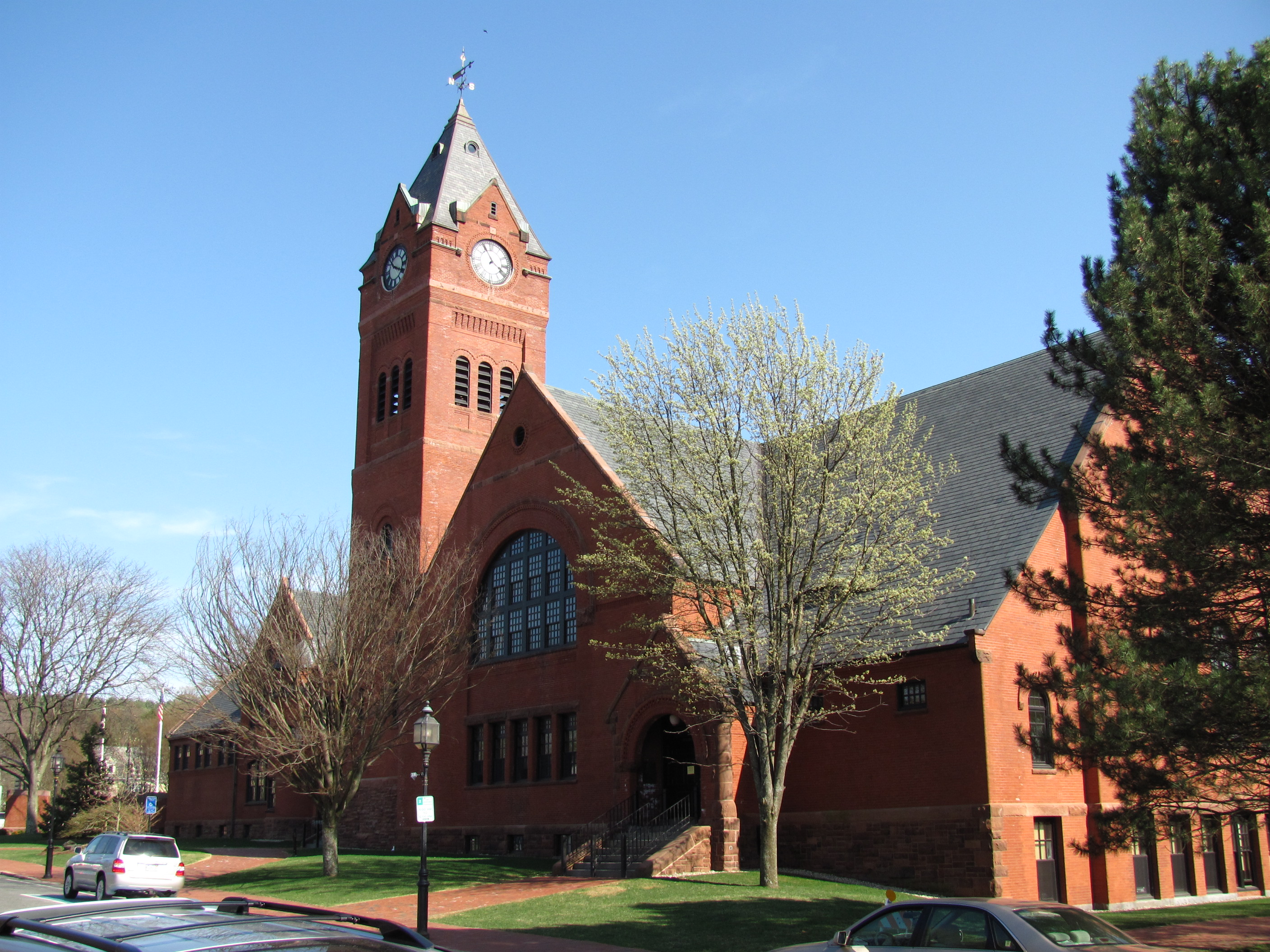
Winchester Town Hall, Winchester, Massachusetts.

Winchester died on 5 August 1850 in Watertown, Massachusetts of typhoid fever at age 49. When he died he was among the richest people in Boston.

The town of Winchester, Massachusetts was named in 1849 following a gift of $3,000 towards the construction of the Winchester Town Hall. Col. Winchester never visited the town having died suddenly soon after. His son, Thomas Bradlee Winchester, presented the town with an oil portrait and a marble bust, as well as a silver punch bowl, originally a gift to the Colonel from friends for use on his yacht.

The last of his direct descendants carrying the Winchester name, Jean Winchester wife of James K. Baldwin, who was the last known Baldwin to have lived for any period in the Baldwin Mansion until her death in 1989.
