= Northern Light (pilot boat) =

Boston Pilot boat

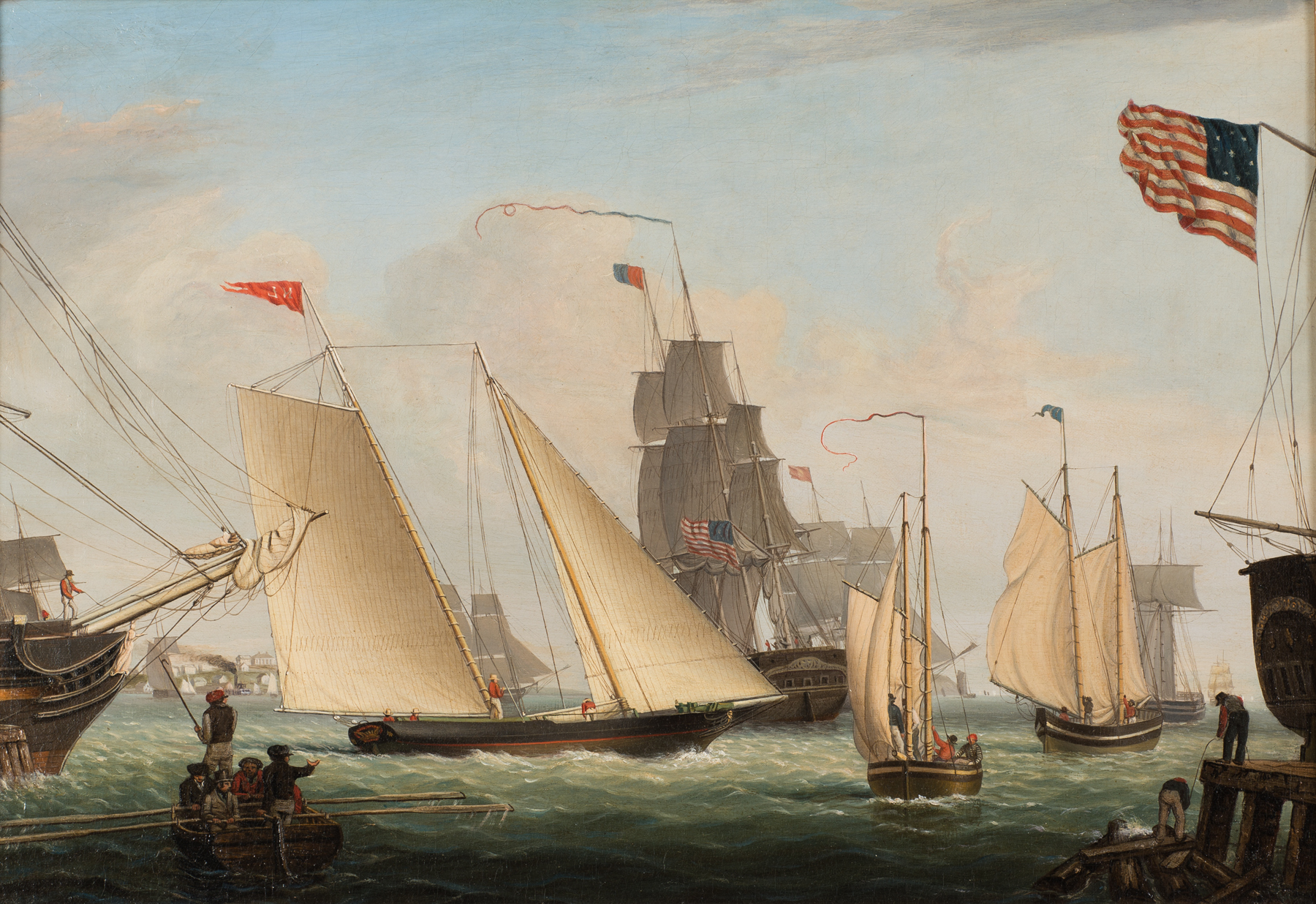
- Yacht Northern Light in Boston Harbor (painting by Fitz Henry Lane.

History

United States
- Name: Northern Light
- Owner: Colonel William P. Winchester (yacht); John Borden (2nd pilot-boat)
- Operator: William P. Winchester (yacht); John Borden (pilot-boat)
- Builder: Whitemore & Holbrook shipyard (yacht); W. F. Stone & Sons shipyard (pilot-boat)
- Launched: 1839 (yacht); 1927 (pilot-boat)
- Out of service: March 14, 1850 (yacht); 1941 (pilot-boat)
- Fate: Sank (yacht); Sold (pilot-boat)

General characteristics
- Class & type: schooner
- Tonnage: 70-tons TM (yacht); 300-tons TM (pilot boat)
- Length: 47 ft 6 in (14.48 m) (yacht); 123 ft 6 in (37.64 m) (pilot boat)
- Beam: 17 ft 6 in (5.33 m) (yacht)
- Depth: 7 ft 3 in (2.21 m) (yacht)
- Propulsion: Sail (yacht); Sail and smi-Diesel engine (pilot boat)

Northern Light was a 19th-century yacht, built in 1839 at the Whitemore & Holbrook shipyard for Colonel William P. Winchester, a Boston merchant. She was designed by Louis Winde, an early yacht designer and shipbuilder. She sank en route to California in 1850. A second Northern Light, was built in 1927 and bought by the Boston Pilots' Association to serve as a pilot-boat from 1934 to 1941. She was sold to the United States Army in 1941 to serve in the war effort during World War II.

== Construction and service ==
=== First Northern Light ===
The Boston yacht Northern Light, was built in 1839 at the Whitemore & Holbrook shipyard for Colonel William P. Winchester who was a Boston merchant. Winchester commissioned Louis Winde, an early yacht designer and shipbuilder, to design and build a model for the yacht. His unique design was later used by George Steers. Her dimensions were, 47.6 feet Length of keel, beam was 17.6 feet, depth was 7.3 feet, and she was 70-tons. She went into Boston commission on July 22, 1939. She was recognized as the "Queen" of the Boston harbor.

In 1840, the yacht Northern Light, met the steamer Brittania off Nixes Mate to welcome her to Boston.

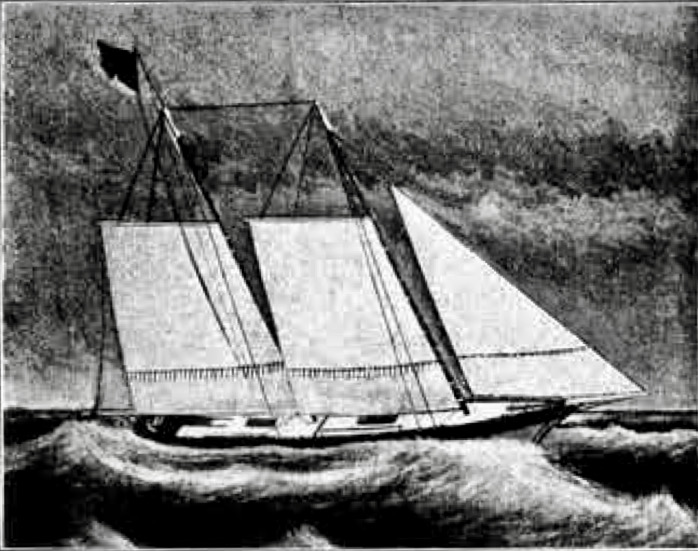
Painting of Northern Light, c. 1903.

In 1843 she started racing and in 1844 she sailed to Newport, Rhode Island, to race in the New York Yacht Club regatta. In 1846, she sailed in the club's second regatta in New York. Captain Winchester was on board the Northern Light. She raced against the schooner Coquette and other entries.

=== End of service ===
Northern Light, was sold in 1847 as a packet ship sailing between Boston and Plymouth, Massachusetts. Winchester repurchased her in 1848, then sold her on 4 December 1849 to a group of men living in Massachusetts.

On 17 December 1849, her new owners sailed Northern Light from Boston on their way to California. On 14 March 1850, she ran into fog entering the dangerous Strait of Magellan, so she anchored in Gregory Bay. When the wind picked up, she dragged her anchors, then struck the rocky shore of Barranca Point. The crew escaped from the shipwreck and arrived safely in Valparaíso, Chile. That same year, friends of Winchester presented a silver punch bowl with the inscription, "Presented To William P Winchester. To Commemorate The Pleasant Hours His Friends Have Passed With Him On Board His Yacht Northern Light."

== Second Northern Light ==
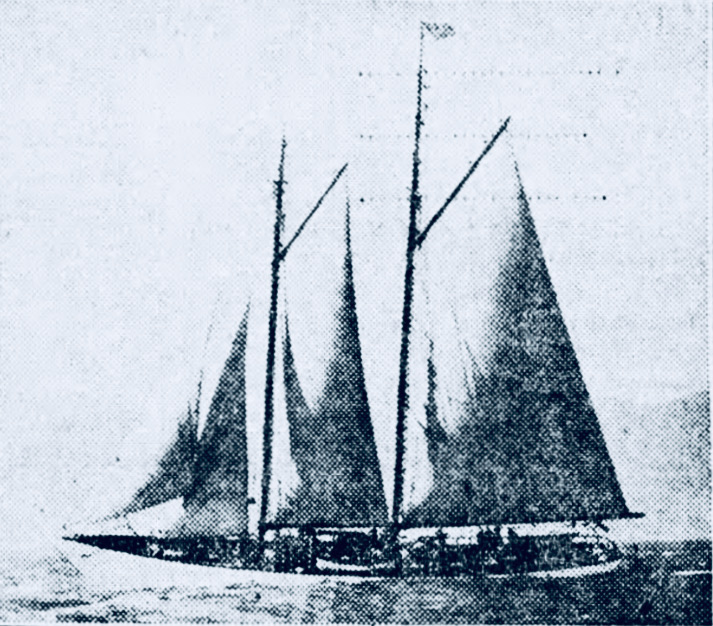
Northern Light en route to the Arctic on 30 Apr 1927.

On 20 January 1927, another boat named Northern Light, was built in W. F. Stone & Sons shipyard in Oakland, California, as a yacht for John Borden, a rich Chicago banker. On 21 April 1927, Borden took her to the Arctic on an expedition for the Field Museum of Chicago to collect Kodiak bear and polar bear and other zoological specimens. Borden, his wife, several friends and a crew of eight. In December 1928, Borden's wife wrote a book about the Arctic trip on Northern Light, called "The Cruise of the Northern Light." It was the first book in which a woman recorded her experiences in the Arctic.

The Boston pilot-boat Liberty, was built in Gloucester, Massachusetts, in 1896. She was in pilot service until 1934, when she was replaced by Northern Light on 15 May 1934. Northern Light, was bought by the Boston Pilot's Association to serve as a pilot-boat for the Boston Harbor. She was changed over to be pilot boat and served from 1934 to 1941. Charles Francis Adams was a distinguished guest when she was in pilot service. As Secretary of the Navy, he was interested in her construction.

=== End of service ===
Northern Light, was sold to the United States Army in 1941 during World War II. Roseway was a replacement for Northern Light when she was sold.

== See also ==
- List of Northeastern U. S. Pilot Boats
