= Armory of the First Corps of Cadets =

- U.S. National Register of Historic Places
- Boston Landmark
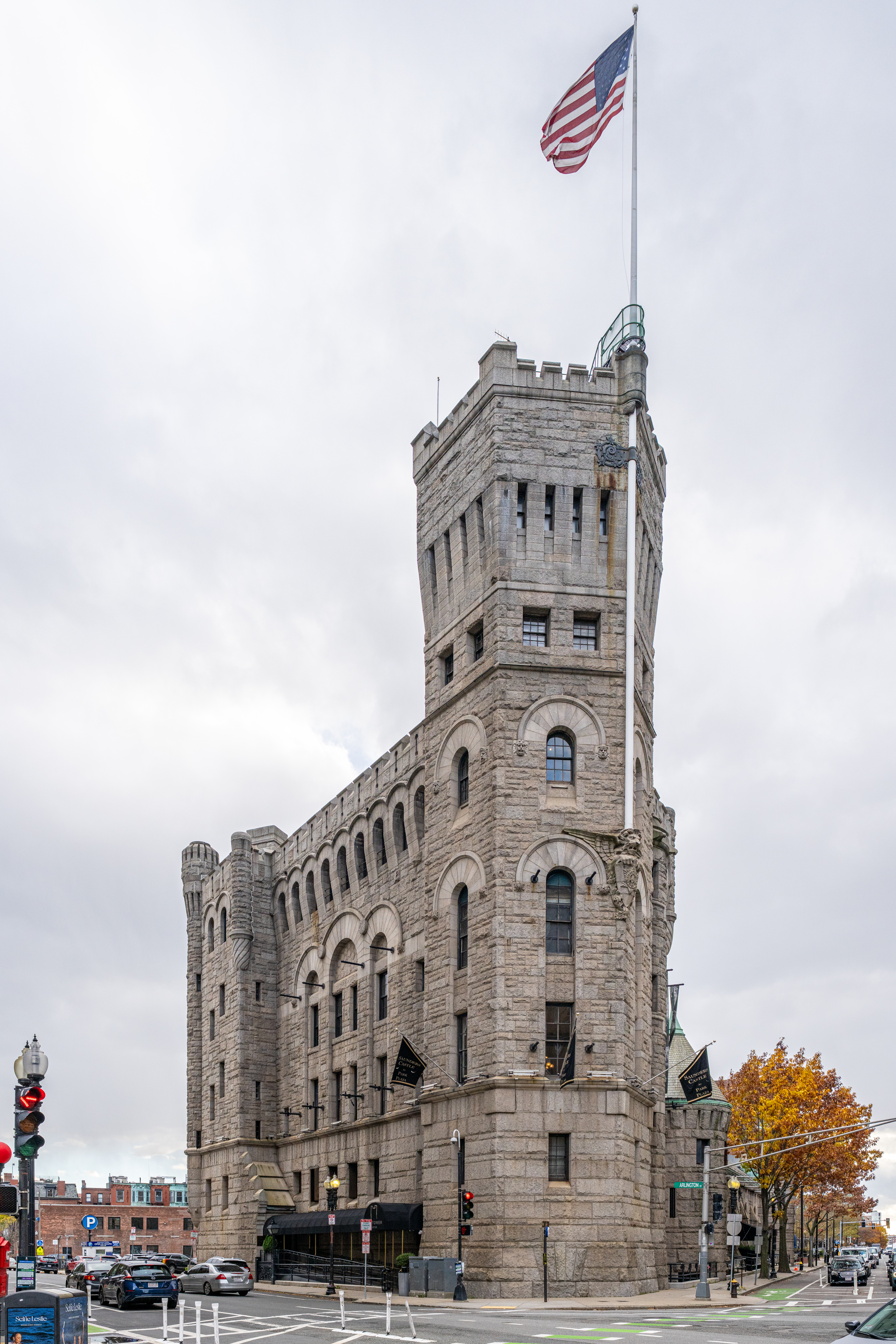
- (2025)

- Location within Boston Location within Massachusetts Location within the United States
- Location: Boston, Massachusetts
- Coordinates: 42°20′58.83″N 71°4′12.05″W
- Built: 1897
- Architect: William Gibbons Preston
- Architectural style: Late Victorian
- NRHP reference No.: 73000314

Significant dates
- Added to NRHP: May 22, 1973
- Designated BOSL: May 10, 1977

The Armory of the First Corps of Cadets is a historic armory at 97–105 Arlington Street and 130 Columbus Avenue in Boston, Massachusetts. Over the years it has been known as Park Plaza Castle, Castle at Park Plaza, and The Tower.

== Description ==
The four-story granite structure was designed by William Gibbons Preston and built beginning in 1891 and finished in 1897. Due to political unrest during the period, the building was designed to withstand mob violence. Its most prominent feature is its six-story tower. It is built in the Romanesque Revival style. The building's staircases are built by the Guastavino system, as are some tower vaults.

The building was built to store armaments and contained a rifle range, gymnasium, and drill hall.

In the late 1960s, the University of Massachusetts Boston leased the building and converted it into the university's first library. The building was listed on the National Register of Historic Places in 1973 and designated as a Boston Landmark by the Boston Landmarks Commission in 1977.

Between the early 2000s and 2018, a Smith & Wollensky steakhouse operated inside the four-story head house.

For years the building was known as the "Park Plaza Castle" and owned by the adjacent Boston Park Plaza, which used it as a banquet facility up until 2014. At that time it was sold and renamed "Castle at Park Plaza."

=== Wedding and events venue ===
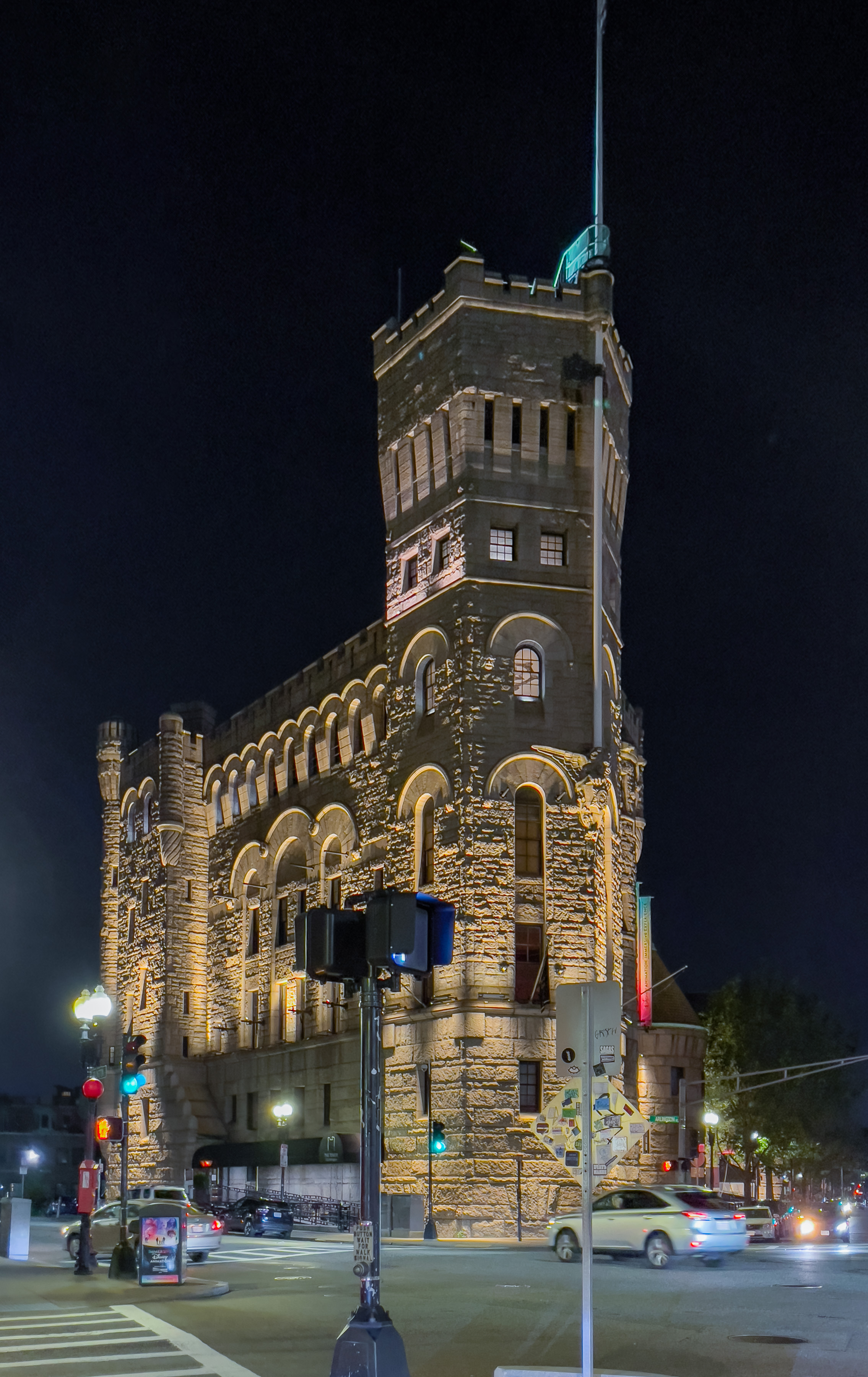
The Tower at night

In 2020, the venue was renovated by new owners and rebranded as a wedding and events venue called "The Tower." Much of the original detailing as well as the doors were retained during the renovation. The Tower contains a distinct area on each of four floors:

- First floor: The Parlor, an open space with wood beams and decorative fireplaces
- 2nd floor: The Gallery, which features high ceilings with vintage chandeliers
- 3rd floor: A 750-square-foot Reading Room
- Top floor: The Library includes a catwalk, original bookcases, and large windows

== See also ==
- First Corps of Cadets (Massachusetts)
- National Register of Historic Places listings in northern Boston, Massachusetts
