= Marshall Jones =

Marshall Jones may refer to:

- Marshall "Rock" Jones (1941–2016), American musician
- Marshall G. Jones, American mechanical engineer

== See also ==
- Marshall W. Jones House, a historic house in Winchester, Massachusetts
