= Marshall W. Jones House =

Historic house in Massachusetts, United States

- U.S. National Register of Historic Places
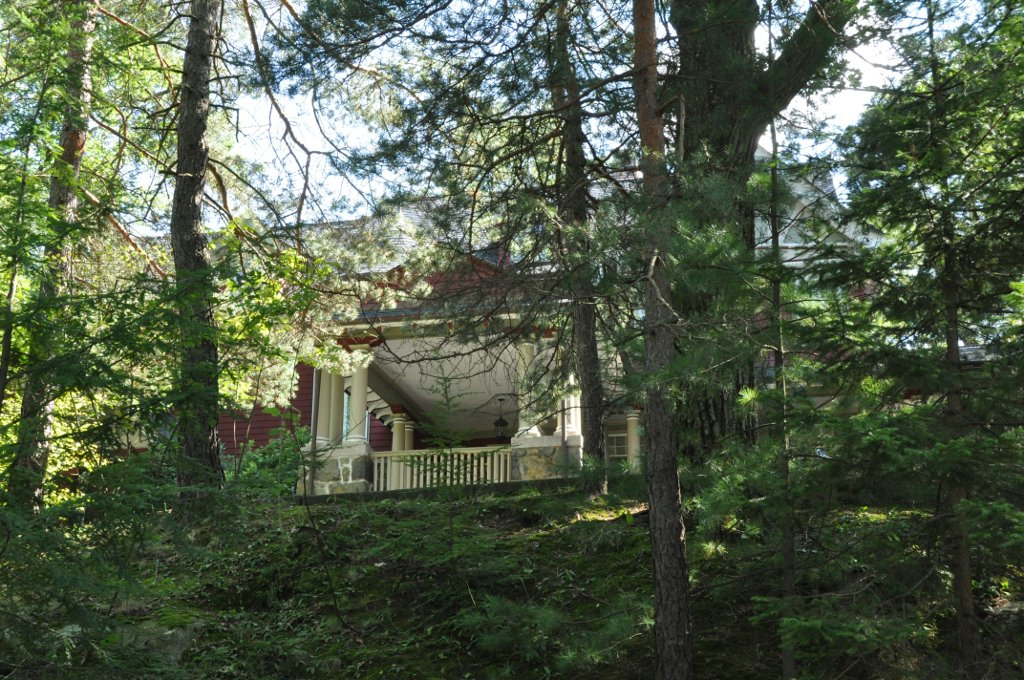

- Location within Massachusetts Location within the United States
- Location: 326 Highland Avenue, Winchester, Massachusetts
- Coordinates: 42°26′53″N 71°7′46″W
- Built: 1901
- Architectural style: Queen Anne
- MPS: Winchester MRA
- NRHP reference No.: 89000649
- Added to NRHP: July 5, 1989

The Marshall W. Jones House is a historic house in Winchester, Massachusetts. A 2.5-story wood-frame Colonial Revival structure, it was built c. 1901 for Marshall W. Jones, a local businessman and active member of the local Board of Health. The house is sited near the Middlesex Fells Reservation, which had recently been established, making the area attractive to wealthy businessmen. The house has an asymmetrical facade dominated by differently-sized cross gables, which are decorated with half-timbering and vergeboard. There is a port cochere between the gables, supported by Tuscan columns.

The house was listed on the National Register of Historic Places in 1989.

== See also ==
- National Register of Historic Places listings in Winchester, Massachusetts
