= 1947–48 British Ice Hockey season =

- Sport: ice hockey

Seasons
- ← 1946–47 1948–49 →

The 1947–48 British Ice Hockey season featured the English National League and Scottish National League.

== English Autumn Cup ==
	Club	GP	W	L	D	GF–GA	Pts
1.	Harringay Racers	10	7	3	0	62:43	14
2.	Streatham Royals	10	6	4	0	44:44	12
3.	Brighton Tigers	10	5	5	0	52:37	10
4.	Wembley All Stars	10	5	5	0	51:41	10
5.	Nottingham Panthers	10	5	5	0	43:46	10
6.	Harringay Greyhounds	10	2	8	0	50:91	4

== English National Tournament ==
	Club	GP	W	T	L	GF–GA	Pts
1.	Streatham Royals	12	7	3	2	50:38	17
2.	Harringay Racers	12	7	2	3	71:32	16
3.	Brighton Tigers	12	4	4	4	44:48	12
4.	Wembley Lions	12	4	6	2	47:70	10
5.	Nottingham Panthers	11	3	3	5	61:65	9
6.	Harringay Greyhounds	11	3	3	5	50:56	9
7.	Wembley Monarchs	12	4	1	7	53:67	9

== Scottish National League ==
=== Eastern Section ===
	Club	GP	W	L	T	GF–GA	Pts
1.	Dundee Tigers	28	20	6	2	157:105	42
2.	Dunfermline Vikings	28	15	12	1	147:122	31
3.	Fife Flyers	28	10	14	4	160:165	24
4.	Perth Panthers	28	5	21	2	120:199	12

=== Western Section ===
	Club	GP	W	L	T	GF–GA	Pts
1.	Paisley Pirates	28	16	10	2	156:134	34
2.	Ayr Raiders	28	16	11	1	146:139	33
3.	Falkirk Lions	28	11	12	5	148:139	27
4.	Glasgow Bruins	28	9	16	3	119:150	21

=== Anderson Trophy Play-offs ===
Stage	Winning Team	Agg.	1st Leg	2nd Leg	Losing Team
Semi-Final	Dundee Tigers	10-2	4-1	6-1	Ayr Raiders
Semi-Final	Dunfermline Vikings	15-2	8-0	7-2	Paisley Pirates
Final	Dundee Tigers	8-7	1-0	7-7	Dunfermline Vikings

== Scottish Cup ==
Stage	Team	Agg.	1st Leg	2nd Leg	Team
1st Round	Falkirk Lions	9-4	5-1	4-3	Dunfermline Vikings
1st Round	Glasgow Bruins	12-3	7-2	5-1	Perth Panthers
1st Round	Paisley Pirates	9-5	4-4	5-1	Dundee Tigers
1st Round	Fife Flyers	14-9	10-5	4-4	Ayr Raiders
Semi-Final	Falkirk Lions	17-8	12-2	5-6	Fife Flyers
Semi-Final	Paisley Pirates	20-5	6-2	14-3	Glasgow Bruins
Final	Paisley Pirates	6-3	3-1	3-2	Falkirk Lions

== Simpson Trophy ==
Stage	Team	Agg.	1st Leg	2nd Leg	Team
Semi-Final	Dundee Tigers	17-11	13-8	4-3	Ayr Raiders
Semi-Final	Dunfermline Vikings	18-8	8-4	10-4	Perth Panthers
Final	Dunfermline Vikings	15-10	6-7	9-3	Dundee Tigers

== Canada Cup ==
	Club	GP	W	L	T	GF	GA	Pts
1.	Dundee Tigers	14	10	2	2	77	47	22
2.	Falkirk Lions	14	9	4	1	78	50	19
3.	Perth Panthers	14	7	6	1	76	74	15
4.	Paisley Pirates	14	6	6	2	75	66	14
5.	Dunfermline Vikings	14	6	7	1	74	71	13
6.	Glasgow Bruins	14	6	7	1	59	72	13
7.	Ayr Raiders	14	5	7	2	61	78	12
8.	Fife Flyers	14	2	12	0	58	100	4

== International competition ==
Great Britain competed at the 1948 Winter Olympics in St. Moritz, Switzerland, which also formed the World Championships and the European Championships. Contested in a round robin format, the British team finished fifth, beating only the nations who finished below them, Poland, Austria and Italy.

== Varsity Match ==
Oxford University defeated Cambridge University 5-2 in the Ice Hockey Varsity Match at Brighton.
