= 1948–49 British Ice Hockey season =

- Sport: ice hockey

Seasons
- ← 1947–48 1949–50 →

The 1948–49 British Ice Hockey season featured the English National League and Scottish National League.

== English Autumn Cup ==
	Club	GP	W	L	D	GF–GA	Pts
1.	Wembley Monarchs	14	10	3	1	70:45	21
2.	Harringay Racers	14	8	3	3	76:54	19
3.	Earls Court Rangers	14	7	6	1	59:56	15
4.	Harringay Greyhounds	14	7	6	1	68:70	15
5.	Nottingham Panthers	14	7	7	0	69:58	14
6.	Streatham Royals	14	6	6	2	52:42	14
7.	Brighton Tigers	14	3	9	2	59:84	8
8.	Wembley Lions	14	3	11	0	46:90	6

== English International Tournament ==
	Club	GP	W	T	L	GF–GA	Pts
1.	Wembley Monarchs	14	9	2	3	78:41	20
2.	Nottingham Panthers	14	9	0	5	79:52	18
3.	Harringay Greyhounds	14	9	0	5	60:55	18
4.	Streatham Royals	14	8	0	6	72:45	16
5.	Brighton Tigers	14	7	0	7	80:64	14
6.	Wembley Lions	14	6	1	7	61:69	13
7.	Earls Court Rangers	14	5	1	8	52:59	11
8.	Racing Club de France	14	1	0	13	41:138	2

== Scottish National League ==
=== Regular season ===
	Club	GP	W	L	T	GF–GA	Pts
1.	Fife Flyers	24	16	5	3	119:74	35
2.	Falkirk Lions	24	17	7	0	152:91	34
3.	Dunfermline Vikings	24	14	7	3	118:103	31
4.	Paisley Pirates	24	10	11	3	137:137	23
5.	Dundee Tigers	24	8	14	2	123:138	18
6.	Perth Panthers	24	8	14	2	106:139	18
7.	Ayr Raiders	24	3	18	3	103:176	9

=== Anderson Trophy Play-offs ===
Stage	Team	Agg.	1st Leg	2nd Leg	Team
Semi-Final	Falkirk Lions	15-9	12-4	3-5	Paisley Pirates
Semi-Final	Fife Flyers	5-7	5-3	10-10	Dunfermline Vikings
Semi-Final Replay	Fife Flyers	3-10	3-4	0-6	Dunfermline Vikings
Final	Falkirk Lions	9-4	3-2	6-2	Dunfermline Vikings

== Scottish Cup ==
	Club	GP	W	L	T	GF	GA	Pts
1.	Falkirk Lions	12	8	3	1	65	49	17
2.	Paisley Pirates	12	7	4	1	79	67	15
3.	Dundee Tigers	12	6	5	1	77	75	13
4.	Fife Flyers	12	5	5	2	63	51	12
5.	Ayr Raiders	12	6	6	0	69	59	12
6.	Dunfermline Vikings	12	4	7	1	70	75	9
7.	Perth Panthers	12	3	9	0	57	104	6

== Simpson Trophy ==
=== Results ===
Final

- Perth Panthers - Dundee Tigers 17:14 on aggregate (8:8, 9:6)

== Canada Cup ==
=== Results ===
	Club	GP	W	L	T	GF	GA	Pts
1.	Falkirk Lions	12	10	2	0	84	44	20
2.	Fife Flyers	12	8	3	1	68	54	17
3.	Paisley Pirates	12	8	4	0	77	64	16
4.	Dunfermline Vikings	12	5	7	0	59	63	10
5.	Ayr Raiders	12	4	8	0	65	79	8
6.	Perth Panthers	12	3	8	1	47	74	7
7.	Dundee Tigers	12	3	9	0	53	75	6

== Varsity Match ==
Oxford University defeated Cambridge University 4-3 in the Ice Hockey Varsity Match at Richmond Ice Rink.
