= 1949–50 British Ice Hockey season =

- Sport: ice hockey

Seasons
- ← 1948–49 1950–51 →

The 1949–50 British Ice Hockey season featured the English National League and Scottish National League.

== English Autumn Cup ==
	Club	GP	W	L	D	GF–GA	Pts
1.	Harringay Racers	36	23	9	4	171:130	50
2.	Wembley Monarchs	36	20	11	5	188:129	45
3.	Nottingham Panthers	36	19	15	2	162:167	40
4.	Streatham Royals	36	16	14	6	146:122	38
5.	Brighton Tigers	36	16	18	2	168:160	34
6.	Wembley Lions	36	8	23	5	149:218	21
7.	Earls Court Rangers	36	8	24	4	110:168	20

== English National Tournament ==
	Club	GP	W	T	L	GF–GA	Pts
1.	Streatham Royals	10	7	1	2	46:34	15
2.	Wembley Monarchs	10	6	2	2	53:35	14
3.	Earls Court Rangers	10	5	2	3	43:32	12
4.	Wembley Lions	10	5	1	4	44:40	11
5.	Brighton Tigers	10	2	1	7	30:50	5
6.	Nottingham Panthers	10	1	1	8	32:57	3

== Scottish National League ==
=== Regular season ===
	Club	GP	W	L	T	GF–GA	Pts
1.	Fife Flyers	24	15	7	2	128:80	32
2.	Dunfermline Vikings	24	15	9	0	109:92	30
3.	Paisley Pirates	24	13	9	2	116:104	28
4.	Falkirk Lions	24	12	9	3	104:84	27
5.	Ayr Raiders	24	10	13	1	100:125	21
6.	Dundee Tigers	24	7	14	3	110:135	17
7.	Perth Panthers	24	6	17	1	94:141	13

=== Anderson Trophy Play-offs ===
Stage	Team	Agg.	1st Leg	2nd Leg	Team
Semi-Final	Fife Flyers	9-7	4-4	5-3	Paisley Pirates
Semi-Final	Dunfermline Vikings	3-5	2-1	1-4	Falkirk Lions
Final	Fife Flyers	5-7	4-1	1-6	Falkirk Lions

== Scottish Cup ==
Stage	Team	Agg.	1st Leg	2nd Leg	Team
1st Round	Dunfermline Vikings	11-9	6-6	5-3	Paisley Pirates
1st Round	Falkirk Lions	15-7	4-3	11-4	Ayr Raiders
1st Round	Dundee Tigers	13-11	7-6	6-5	Perth Panthers
Semi-Final	Fife Flyers	11-8	8-1	3-7	Falkirk Lions
Semi-Final	Dunfermline Vikings	7-7	5-4	2-3*	Dundee Tigers
Semi-Final Replay	Dunfermline Vikings	10-9	4-2	6-7	Dundee Tigers
Final	Dunfermline Vikings	12-11	4-6	8-5	Fife Flyers

Note: *Overtime was played to break the tie. After two scoreless 10 minute overtime periods, it was decided that the series would be replayed)

== Canada Cup ==
	Club	GP	W	L	T	GF	GA	Pts
1.	Fife Flyers	12	9	2	1	67	40	19
2.	Dunfermline Vikings	12	8	4	0	65	38	16
3.	Dundee Tigers	12	5	5	2	61	57	12
4.	Paisley Pirates	12	5	5	2	60	65	12
5.	Falkirk Lions	12	4	6	2	43	59	10
6.	Ayr Raiders	12	4	7	1	46	64	9
7.	Perth Panthers	12	3	9	0	57	76	6

== International competition ==
Great Britain hosted the 1950 Ice Hockey World Championships at Wembley Arena, Empress Hall and Harringay Arena in London. The hosts topped their first round group with wins over Norway and France, and won two more matches in the final round against Sweden and again Norway to finish fourth. The tournament also acted as the Ice Hockey European Championships, in which the British won their final silver medal at this level.

== Varsity Match ==
Oxford University defeated Cambridge University 3-0 in the Ice Hockey Varsity Match at Richmond Ice Rink.
