= 1950–51 British Ice Hockey season =

- Sport: ice hockey

Seasons
- ← 1949–50 1951–52 →

The 1950–51 British Ice Hockey season featured the English National League and Scottish National League.

== English Autumn Cup ==
	Club	GP	W	L	T	GF	GA	Pts
1.	Brighton Tigers	30	17	10	3	156	117	37
2.	Streatham Royals	30	16	10	4	113	103	36
3.	Earls Court Rangers	30	13	11	6	121	135	32
4.	Nottingham Panthers	30	12	11	7	148	134	31
5.	Wembley Lions	30	10	14	6	127	136	26
6.	Harringay Racers	30	6	18	6	138	178	18

== Scottish National League ==
=== Regular season ===
	Club	GP	W	L	T	GF–GA	Pts
1.	Paisley Pirates	36	23	10	3	202:139	49
2.	Perth Panthers	36	20	12	4	151:123	44
3.	Dunfermline Vikings	36	20	13	3	160:153	43
4.	Falkirk Lions	36	16	15	5	135:135	37
5.	Ayr Raiders	36	15	16	5	145:157	35
6.	Fife Flyers	36	12	21	3	136:166	27
7.	Dundee Tigers	36	6	25	5	110:166	17

=== Anderson Trophy Play-offs ===
Stage	Team	Agg.	1st Leg	2nd Leg	Team
Semi-Final	Paisley Pirates	17-5	4-4	13-1	Dunfermline Vikings
Semi-Final	Falkirk Lions	10-6	6-2	4-4	Perth Panthers
Final	Paisley Pirates	7-3	1-1	6-2	Falkirk Lions

== Scottish Autumn Cup ==
	Club	GP	W	L	T	GF	GA	Pts
1.	Ayr Raiders	12	7	3	2	68	51	16
2.	Fife Flyers	12	7	3	2	59	46	16
3.	Perth Panthers	12	7	5	0	63	56	14
4.	Dunfermline Vikings	12	5	5	2	55	46	12
5.	Falkirk Lions	12	5	6	1	46	43	11
6.	Paisley Pirates	12	5	6	1	57	63	11
7.	Dundee Tigers	12	2	10	0	32	75	4

=== Tiebreaker ===
Ayr and Fife played a tiebreaker series after tying on points and it had previously been decided that goal difference wouldn't count in such a situation. The first two games were completed with the teams still tied, so another two games were arranged to decide a winner.

Team	Agg.	1st Leg	2nd Leg	Team
Ayr Raiders	8-8	7-2	1-6	Fife Flyers
Ayr Raiders	11-14	7-3	4-11	Fife Flyers

== Scottish Cup ==
Stage	Team	Agg.	1st Leg	2nd Leg	Team
1st Round	Fife Flyers	14-2	7-1	7-1	Ayr Raiders
1st Round	Dunfermline Vikings	9-10	7-2	2-8	Dundee Tigers
1st Round	Paisley Pirates	14-3	6-3	8-0	Perth Panthers
Semi-Final	Paisley Pirates	12-9	4-4	8-5	Dundee Tigers
Semi-Final	Fife Flyers	16-6	10-2	6-4	Falkirk Lions
Final	Paisley Pirates	12-12	6-3	6-8 OT*	Fife Flyers

Note: *(1:2, 2:4, 1:1 - as the series was now tied on aggregate, overtime was played - 1:1, 1:0)

== Canada Cup ==
	Club	GP	W	L	T	GF	GA	Pts
1.	Dunfermline Vikings	12	7	2	3	53	47	17
2.	Falkirk Lions	12	7	5	0	51	40	14
3.	Perth Panthers	12	6	4	2	51	46	14
4.	Paisley Pirates	12	6	6	0	55	50	12
5.	Fife Flyers	12	5	6	1	52	49	11
6.	Dundee Tigers	12	4	6	2	40	48	10
7.	Ayr Raiders	12	3	9	0	50	72	6

== International competition ==
Great Britain competed at the 1951 Ice Hockey World Championships in Paris, France. The British team won one match against Finland and tied with United States to finish fifth in the world rankings and fourth in the European rankings.

== Varsity Match ==
Oxford University beat Cambridge University 6-3 in the varsity match at Richmond Ice Rink.
