= 1946–47 British Ice Hockey season =

- Sport: ice hockey

Seasons
- ← 1939–40 1947–48 →

The 1946–47 British Ice Hockey season featured the English National League and Scottish National League.

== English National Tournament ==
	Club	GP	W	T	L	GF–GA	Pts
1.	Brighton Tigers	6	6	0	0	46:14	12
2.	Nottingham Panthers	6	1	3	2	20:27	5
3.	Wembley	6	1	2	3	21:38	4
4.	Streatham Royals	6	1	1	4	24:32	3

== English Autumn Cup ==
	Club	GP	W	T	L	GF–GA	Pts
1.	Brighton Tigers	12	7	1	4	52:34	18
2.	Wembley Lions	12	3	3	5	41:41	11
3.	Wembley Monarchs	12	3	4	5	54:61	11
4.	Streatham Royals	12	2	6	4	47:54	8

== Scottish National League ==
=== Regular season ===
	Club	GP	W	L	T	GF–GA	Pts
1.	Perth Panthers	24	15	7	2	129:107	32
2.	Dunfermline Vikings	24	14	9	1	117:93	29
3.	Fife Flyers	24	12	10	2	115:108	26
4.	Paisley Pirates	24	11	10	3	102:105	25
5.	Dundee Tigers	24	9	11	4	114:109	22
6.	Ayr Raiders	24	10	13	1	118:122	21
7.	Falkirk Lions	24	6	17	1	89:140	13

=== Anderson Trophy Play-Offs ===
Stage	Team	Agg.	1st Leg	2nd Leg	Team
Semi-Final	Dunfermline Vikings	10-5	7-4	3-1	Paisley Pirates
Semi-Final	Fife Flyers	16-9	9-2	7-7	Perth Panthers
Final	Dunfermline Vikings	7-2	2-0	5-2	Fife Flyers

== Scottish League Flag Competition ==
	Club	GP	W	L	T	GF	GA	Pts
1.	Dunfermline Vikings	12	7	4	1	58	39	15
2.	Paisley Pirates	12	6	4	2	47	40	14
3.	Ayr Raiders	12	6	4	2	53	53	14
4.	Perth Panthers	12	5	5	2	60	60	12
5.	Dundee Tigers	12	6	6	0	54	61	12
6.	Falkirk Lions	12	5	6	1	52	65	11
7.	Fife Flyers	12	3	9	0	60	66	6

== Simpson Trophy ==
=== Results ===
Known scores

Team	Score	Team
Dunfermline Vikings	7-3	Perth Panthers
Falkirk Lions	6-4	Fife Flyers
Ayr Raiders	7-4	Paisley Pirates
Perth Panthers	6-5	Paisley Pirates
Fife Flyers	8-4	Dundee Tigers
Ayr Raiders	7-4	Falkirk Lions
Ayr Raiders	10-5	Dundee Tigers
Dundee Tigers	9-4	Falkirk Lions
Fife Flyers	8-3	Falkirk Lions
Ayr Raiders	12-7	Fife Flyers
Dunfermline Vikings	7-9	Perth Panthers

Table

	Club	GP	GF	GA	Avg.
1.	Ayr Raiders	4	36	20	1.80
2.	Dunfermline Vikings	4	31	22	1.41
3.	Perth Panthers	4	25	21	1.19
4.	Fife Flyers	4	27	25	1.08
5.	Dundee Tigers	4	22	29	0.76
6.	Falkirk Lions	4	17	28	0.61
7.	Paisley Pirates	4	17	30	0.57

== Canada Cup ==
	Club	GP	W	L	T	GF	GA	Pts
1.	Dunfermline Vikings	12	9	3	0	72	39	18
2.	Perth Panthers	12	8	4	0	66	63	16
3.	Paisley Pirates	12	7	5	0	58	50	14
4.	Dundee Tigers	12	6	6	0	60	52	12
5.	Ayr Raiders	12	5	7	0	53	66	10
6.	Fife Flyers	12	4	8	0	49	63	8
7.	Falkirk Lions	12	3	9	0	45	70	6

== Varsity Match ==
Oxford University defeated Cambridge University 15-4 in the Ice Hockey Varsity Match at Brighton.
