= Thomas Imrie =

Scottish ice hockey player (1937–2020)

- Born: 15 July 1937 Falkirk, Scotland
- Died: 24 August 2020 (aged 83)
- Position: Defence
- Played for: Falkirk Lions; Murrayfield/Edinburgh Royals; Paisley Pirates; Streatham; Brighton Tigers; Wembley Lions
- Playing career: 1954–1969

Thomas "Red" Imrie (15 July 1937 – 24 August 2020) was a British ice hockey defender who played in the United Kingdom during the 1950s and 1960s. He also played for the Great Britain national team between 1961 and 1966. He was inducted into the British Ice Hockey Hall of Fame in 1987.

== Career ==
Born in Falkirk, Scotland, Imrie began playing senior ice hockey for the Falkirk Lions in the Scottish National League as a forward before he settled on defence during the first season of the British National League in 1954–55. The following season, the Lions opted to play amateur ice hockey so Imrie joined the Edinburgh Royals. He helped them to win the Northern British League in the 1957–58 season. For the 1959–60 season, Imrie joined the Paisley Pirates. However, he was posted to southern England during his National Service and therefore finished the season with Streatham IHC, helping them to win both the Autumn Cup and the league title.

After Streatham also opted out of ice hockey, Imrie went on to play for the Brighton Tigers, initially as captain and then as player-coach. With the Tigers, Imrie was named to the all-star teams a total of six times, both as a player and coach. Imrie then joined the Wembley Lions after the Tigers' rink closed in 1965. Imrie retired from playing when the Wembley Lions folded in 1969. When Streatham reformed in 1974 as the Redskins, Imrie became the team coach and guided them to many playoff finals, including his last season behind the bench in 1985.

After his retirement, Imrie continued to work with the Streatham second team, the Bruins, and he became a colour commentator for BBC television.

Imrie played for the Great Britain national team on three occasions: 1961, 1962 and 1966. At the 1966 tournament in Yugoslavia, he was named the World Championships Pool B Best Defenceman.

He has two daughters, one of whom is called Elizabeth Imrie.

He died on 24 August 2020 at the age of 83.

== Awards and honours ==
- All-star A Team Defenceman in 1961–62, 1962–63 and 1964–65.
- All-star B Team Defenceman in 1963–64.
- All-star B Team Coach in 1963–64 and 1964–65.
- Named World Championships Pool B Best Defenceman in 1966.
- Inducted to the British Ice Hockey Hall of Fame in 1987.
