= British ice hockey league champions =

The British ice hockey league champions are the winners of the regular season of the highest ice hockey league in the United Kingdom, currently the Elite Ice Hockey League. Previously, the highest league has been the British National League (1954–60), the Premier Division (1983–96) and the Ice Hockey Superleague (1996–2003).

While the regular season winners are recognised as the British League champions, the British champions are regarded as the winners of the end-of-season playoffs, for which the league provides qualification and seeding.

== History ==
Prior to the formation of the British National League, England and Scotland each had their own competitions. The English League was founded in 1931 with the Scottish National League being formed a year later. The majority of English League clubs left to form the English National League in 1935, leading the disbandment of the English League at the end of the 1935–36 season. The Scottish National League and English National League both continued until 1954. In that year the decision was taken to amalgamate the two leagues into one. The new competition initially fielded 12 sides in its inaugural season, four from England and eight from Scotland. The Dunfermline Vikings withdrew from the league in early 1955 and at the end of the season six of the seven remaining Scottish sides withdrew, leaving the league with five members. This fell to four following the closure of Harringay Arena in 1958 but increased again to five in 1959 following the admission of Streatham. The league was disbanded following the 1959–60 season.

Following the closure of the British National League, no league competition took place in the United Kingdom for the next six years. Instead clubs, some of which did not have a home rink, participated in rink tournaments. In 1966 the Northern League was formed. This league was made up of teams from Scotland and North East England and was the country's only league for four years. The Southern League was established in 1970 and was divided into the English League North and Inter-City League in 1978. The British Hockey League was formed in 1982 with the Premier Division being launched a season later. There has been a British league continuously since then, although there have been three different organisations and the number of teams taking part has varied from twelve in 1993–94, 1994–95 and 2017–18 to five in 2002–03. The current Elite Ice Hockey League was established in 2003.

There has been a British league competition for 48 seasons and 16 teams have won the league championship. The most successful club is the Sheffield Steelers, who have won the championship on ten occasions, followed by the Belfast Giants (9), the Cardiff Devils (6), the now-defunct Durham Wasps (5) and the Coventry Blaze (4). The Nottingham Panthers, the only club to have played in all 47 seasons, have won the title twice (additionally Nottingham were English champions twice before the British National League was formed). The Durham Wasps, Murrayfield Racers, Cardiff Devils, Sheffield Steelers, Coventry Blaze and Belfast Giants are the only sides to have successfully defended a title.

== Champions ==
=== 1954–60: British National League ===
Season	Winner (number of titles)	Runner-up	Third	Top points scorer	
Season	Winner (number of titles)	Runner-up	Third	Player	Points
1954–55	Harringay Racers (1)	Nottingham Panthers	Paisley Pirates	Chick Zamick (Nottingham)	112
1955–56	Nottingham Panthers (1)	Wembley Lions	Paisley Pirates	Statistics not available (Note: The primary source for statistics in British ice hockey in the post war period was the Ice Hockey World Annual. This ceased publishing following its 1956 edition and therefore the top points scorer after that time is not presently known.)	
1956–57	Wembley Lions (1)	Harringay Racers	Brighton Tigers	Statistics not available	
1957–58	Brighton Tigers (1)	Nottingham Panthers	Harringay Racers	Statistics not available	
1958–59	Paisley Pirates (1)	Wembley Lions	Brighton Tigers	Statistics not available	
1959–60	Streatham (1)	Nottingham Panthers	Brighton Tigers	Statistics not available	

=== 1982–96: Premier Division ===
Season	Winner (number of titles)	Runner-up	Third	Top points scorer	
Season	Winner (number of titles)	Runner-up	Third	Player	Points
1982–83	Dundee Rockets (1)	Durham Wasps			
1983–84	Dundee Rockets (2)	Durham Wasps	Streatham Redskins	Roy Halpin (Dundee)	175
1984–85	Durham Wasps (1)	Fife Flyers	Murrayfield Racers	David Stoyanovich (Fife)	175
1985–86	Durham Wasps (2)	Murrayfield Racers	Ayr Bruins	Tim Salmon (Ayr)	254
1986–87	Murrayfield Racers (1)	Dundee Rockets	Nottingham Panthers	Rick Fera (Murrayfield)	242
1987–88	Murrayfield Racers (2)	Whitley Warriors	Fife Flyers	Scott Morrison (Whitley)	224
1988–89	Durham Wasps (3)	Murrayfield Racers	Nottingham Panthers	Rick Brebant (Durham)	218
1989–90	Cardiff Devils (1)	Murrayfield Racers	Durham Wasps	Steve Moria (Cardiff)	175
1990–91	Durham Wasps (4)	Cardiff Devils	Peterborough Pirates	Rick Brebant (Durham)	209
1991–92	Durham Wasps (5)	Nottingham Panthers	Cardiff Devils	Rick Brebant (Durham)	160
1992–93	Cardiff Devils (2)	Murrayfield Racers	Nottingham Panthers	Tony Hand (Murrayfield)	185
1993–94	Cardiff Devils (3)	Sheffield Steelers	Fife Flyers	Tony Hand (Murrayfield)	222
1994–95	Sheffield Steelers (1)	Cardiff Devils	Nottingham Panthers	Tony Hand (Murrayfield)	207
1995–96	Sheffield Steelers (2)	Cardiff Devils	Durham Wasps	Tony Hand (Sheffield)	135

=== 1996–2003: Ice Hockey Superleague ===
Season	Winner (number of titles)	Runner-up	Third	Top points scorer	
Season	Winner (number of titles)	Runner-up	Third	Player	Points
1996–97	Cardiff Devils (4)	Sheffield Steelers	Ayr Scottish Eagles	Dale Junkin (Bracknell)	60
1997–98	Ayr Scottish Eagles (1)	Manchester Storm	Cardiff Devils	Tony Hand (Sheffield)	39
1998–99	Manchester Storm (1)	Cardiff Devils	Nottingham Panthers	Paul Adey (Nottingham)	56
1999–2000	Bracknell Bees (1)	Sheffield Steelers	Manchester Storm	Ed Courtenay (Sheffield)	70
2000–01	Sheffield Steelers (3)	Cardiff Devils	Bracknell Bees	Greg Bullock (Manchester)	60
2001–02	Belfast Giants (1)	Ayr Scottish Eagles	Sheffield Steelers	Kevin Riehl (Belfast)	56
2002–03	Sheffield Steelers (4)	Belfast Giants	Nottingham Panthers	Lee Jinman (Nottingham)	36

=== 2003–present: Elite Ice Hockey League ===
Season	Winner (number of titles)	Runner-up	Third	Top points scorer	
Season	Winner (number of titles)	Runner-up	Third	Player	Points
2003-04	Sheffield Steelers (5)	Nottingham Panthers	Coventry Blaze	Mark Dutiaume (Sheffield)	88
2004–05	Coventry Blaze (1)	Belfast Giants	Cardiff Devils	Dan Carlson (Coventry)	61
2005–06	Belfast Giants (2)	Newcastle Vipers	Nottingham Panthers	Theo Fleury (Belfast)	81
2006–07	Coventry Blaze (2)	Belfast Giants	Cardiff Devils	Dan Tessier (Sheffield)	84
2007–08	Coventry Blaze (3)	Sheffield Steelers	Nottingham Panthers	Adam Calder (Coventry)	104
2008–09	Sheffield Steelers (6)	Coventry Blaze	Nottingham Panthers	David-Alexandre Beauregard (Manchester)	107
2009–10	Coventry Blaze (4)	Belfast Giants	Nottingham Panthers	Colin Shields (Belfast)	106
2010–11	Sheffield Steelers (7)	Cardiff Devils	Belfast Giants	Jon Pelle (Cardiff)	111
2011–12	Belfast Giants (3)	Sheffield Steelers	Nottingham Panthers	Jade Galbraith (Braehead)	101
2012–13	Nottingham Panthers (2)	Belfast Giants	Sheffield Steelers	David Ling (Nottingham)	95
2013–14	Belfast Giants (4)	Sheffield Steelers	Dundee Stars	Ryan Ginand (Coventry)	85
2014–15	Sheffield Steelers (8)	Braehead Clan	Cardiff Devils	Mathieu Roy (Sheffield)	79
2015–16	Sheffield Steelers (9)	Cardiff Devils	Braehead Clan	Mathew Sisca (Manchester)	75
2016–17	Cardiff Devils (5)	Belfast Giants	Sheffield Steelers	Matt Beca (Braehead)	75
2017–18	Cardiff Devils (6)	Manchester Storm	Sheffield Steelers	Mike Hammond (Manchester)	83
2018–19	Belfast Giants (5)	Cardiff Devils	Nottingham Panthers	Darcy Murphy (Belfast)	79
2019–20	Season abandoned due to coronavirus pandemic. No championship awarded.			Sam Herr (Nottingham)	59
2020–21	Season cancelled entirely due to coronavirus pandemic. No championship awarded.			N/A	N/A
2021–22	Belfast Giants (6)	Sheffield Steelers	Cardiff Devils	J.J. Piccinich (Belfast)	80
2022–23	Belfast Giants (7)	Guildford Flames	Sheffield Steelers	Scott Conway (Belfast)	90
2023–24	Sheffield Steelers (10)	Cardiff Devils	Belfast Giants	Mitchell Balmas (Sheffield)	66
2024–25	Belfast Giants (8)	Sheffield Steelers	Nottingham Panthers	Alexis D'Aoust (Manchester)	68
2025–26	Belfast Giants (9)	Cardiff Devils	Nottingham Panthers	Mitchell Balmas (Sheffield)	65

== Total titles won ==
Teams in bold are current Elite Ice Hockey League members. Teams in italics are teams which play outside of the Elite Ice Hockey League. The remaining teams are defunct, although Dundee, Edinburgh (home of the Murrayfield Racers) and Manchester still have their own ice hockey teams.

Club	Winners	Runners-up	Winning years
**Sheffield Steelers**	10	8	1994–95, 1995–96, 2000–01, 2002–03, 2003–04, 2008–09, 2010–11, 2014–15, 2015–16, 2023–24
**Belfast Giants**	9	6	2001–02, 2005–06, 2011–12, 2013–14, 2018–19, 2021–22, 2022-23, 2024-25, 2025-26
**Cardiff Devils**	6	8	1989–90, 1992–93, 1993–94, 1996–97, 2016–17, 2017–18
Durham Wasps	5	2	1984–85, 1985–86, 1988–89, 1990–91, 1991–92
**Coventry Blaze**	4	1	2004–05, 2006–07, 2007–08, 2009–10
**Nottingham Panthers**	2	5	1955–56, 2012–13
Murrayfield Racers	2	4	1986–87, 1987–88
Dundee Rockets	2	1	1982-83, 1983–84
Wembley Lions	1	2	1956–57
Harringay Racers	1	1	1954–55
Ayr Scottish Eagles	1	1	1997–98
Manchester Storm	1	1	1998–99
Brighton Tigers	1	0	1957–58
Paisley Pirates	1	0	1958–59
Streatham	1	0	1959–60
Bracknell Bees	1	0	1999–2000

== Total titles won by Home Nation ==
Each of the four constituent nations of the United Kingdom have had at least one team who have been British champions. 10 different teams from England have been league champions on 27 occasions, while 4 Scottish sides have won five times between them, while Welsh side Cardiff Devils (6) and the Northern Ireland based Belfast Giants (8) are the only sides from their parts of the United Kingdom to win the league. In 46 completed seasons, English sides have won 27 titles, while the Celtic nations combined have won 19.

Nation	Number of titles	Clubs
England	27	Sheffield Steelers (10), Durham Wasps (5), Coventry Blaze (4), Nottingham Panthers (2), Bracknell Bees (1), Manchester Storm (1), Streatham (1), Brighton Tigers (1), Wembley Lions (1), Harringay Racers (1)
Northern Ireland	9	Belfast Giants (9)
Wales	6	Cardiff Devils (6)
Scotland	5	Murrayfield Racers (2), Ayr Scottish Eagles (1), Dundee Rockets (1), Paisley Pirates (1)
