= 1938–39 British Ice Hockey season =

- Sport: ice hockey

Seasons
- ← 1937–38 1939–40 →

The 1938–39 British Ice Hockey season featured the English National League and Scottish National League.

== London Cup ==
=== Results ===
	Club	GP	W	L	T	GF	GA	Pts
1.	Wembley Lions	12	9	1	2	41	22	20
2.	Harringay Racers	12	6	3	3	34	24	15
3.	Harringay Greyhounds	12	6	4	2	20	20	14
4.	Streatham	12	5	5	2	35	33	12
5.	Wembley Monarchs	12	3	6	3	28	31	9
6.	Brighton Tigers	12	2	7	3	34	47	7
7.	Earls Court Rangers	12	2	7	3	30	45	7

== Scottish National League ==
=== Points Competition ===
Scores

Date	Team 1	Score	Team 2
10/4	Kelvingrove	4 - 3	Mohawks
10/5	Perth Panthers	2 - 2	Dundee Tigers
10/6	Falkirk Lions	3 - 1	Fife Flyers
10/7	Dundee Tigers	5 - 2	Mohawks
10/8	Falkirk Lions	3 - 0	Perth Panthers
10/11	Kelvingrove	2 - 2	Fife Flyers
10/12	Falkirk Lions	4 - 1	Dundee Tigers
10/13	Fife Flyers	4 - 2	Perth Panthers
10/14	Falkirk Lions	3 - 1	Mohawks
10/15	Dundee Tigers	4 - 2	Perth Panthers
10/18	Perth Panthers	3 - 1	Kelvingrove
10/19	Dundee Tigers	8 - 2	Mohawks
10/20	Fife Flyers	8 - 1	Kelvingrove
10/21	Perth Panthers	1 - 0	Mohawks
10/22	Perth Panthers	1 - 1	Kelvingrove
10/25	Falkirk Lions	3 - 1	Kelvingrove
10/26	Dundee Tigers	9 - 7	Fife Flyers
10/27	Fife Flyers	4 - 3	Dundee Tigers
10/28	Kelvingrove	3 - 1	Mohawks
10/29	Falkirk Lions	4 - 2	Perth Panthers
11/1	Fife Flyers	2 - 1	Mohawks
11/2	Falkirk Lions	4 - 3	Dundee Tigers
11/3	Fife Flyers	4 - 2	Mohawks
11/4	Dundee Tigers	3 - 2	Kelvingrove
11/5	Perth Panthers	4 - 2	Fife Flyers
11/8	Falkirk Lions	6 - 2	Mohawks
11/9	Dundee Tigers	4 - 1	Kelvingrove
11/10	Fife Flyers	4 - 4	Falkirk Lions
11/11	Kelvingrove	1 - 1	Mohawks
11/15	Mohawks	5 - 4	Kelvingrove
11/16	Dundee Tigers	5 - 2	Perth Panthers
11/17	Fife Flyers	3 - 1	Falkirk Lions
11/18	Dundee Tigers	3 - 2	Mohawks
11/19	Perth Panthers	5 - 3	Kelvingrove
11/22	Fife Flyers	5 - 1	Kelvingrove
11/23	Falkirk Lions	4 - 3	Dundee Tigers
11/24	Perth Panthers	4 - 3	Fife Flyers
11/26	Dundee Tigers	2 - 1	Perth Panthers
11/30	Perth Panthers	3 - 2	Falkirk Lions
11/30	Dundee Tigers	6 - 2	Mohawks
12/1	Fife Flyers	6 - 4	Kelvingrove
12/4	Falkirk Lions	5 - 3	Perth Panthers
12/6	Falkirk Lions	7 - 3	Kelvingrove
12/7	Mohawks	4 - 2	Falkirk Lions
12/7	Fife Flyers	4 - 3	Dundee Tigers
12/8	Fife Flyers	2 - 2	Dundee Tigers
12/9	Mohawks	4 - 1	Kelvingrove
12/14	Dundee Tigers	6 - 3	Falkirk Lions
12/15	Fife Flyers	4 - 1	Mohawks
12/16	Dundee Tigers	8 - 1	Kelvingrove
12/17	Perth Panthers	7 - 4	Fife Flyers
12/21	Dundee Tigers	5 - 1	Kelvingrove
12/21	Falkirk Lions	4 - 0	Mohawks
12/27	Perth Panthers	5 - 2	Kelvingrove
12/28	Falkirk Lions	4 - 0	Kelvingrove
12/30	Perth Panthers	2 - 2	Mohawks
1/3	Mohawks	4 - 4	Fife Flyers
1/4	Falkirk Lions	4 - 2	Fife Flyers
1/6	Perth Panthers	7 - 4	Mohawks
1/7	Perth Panthers	8 - 5	Mohawks

Table

	Club	GP	W	L	T	GF–GA	Pts
1.	Falkirk Lions	20	14	4	2	71:43	30
2.	Dundee Tigers	20	13	5	2	85:52	28
3.	Fife Flyers	20	10	6	4	75:62	24
4.	Perth Panthers	20	10	7	3	64:58	23
5.	Glasgow Mohawks	20	3	15	2	47:81	8
6.	Kelvingrove	20	2	15	3	37:83	7

=== Regular season ===
Scores

Date	Team 1	Score	Team 2
1/11	Perth Panthers	2 - 1	Falkirk Lions
1/11	Dundee Tigers	11 - 2	Kelvingrove
1/12	Mohawks	4 - 4	Fife Flyers
1/17	Mohawks	3 - 1	Kelvingrove
1/18	Dundee Tigers	5 - 2	Fife Flyers
1/20	Fife Flyers	5 - 0	Kelvingrove
1/21	Perth Panthers	5 - 4	Falkirk Lions
1/24	Fife Flyers	4 - 1	Mohawks
1/25	Falkirk Lions	3 - 3	Dundee Tigers
1/26	Perth Panthers	1 - 0	Fife Flyers
1/27	Dundee Tigers	2 - 2	Kelvingrove
1/31	Kelvingrove	4 - 1	Perth Panthers
2/1	Dundee Tigers	8 - 3	Mohawks
2/1	Falkirk Lions	4 - 4	Fife Flyers
2/3	Falkirk Lions	3 - 2	Mohawks
2/4	Perth Panthers	7 - 1	Kelvingrove
2/7	Perth Panthers	4 - 2	Mohawks
2/8	Dundee Tigers	9 - 2	Falkirk Lions
2/9	Fife Flyers	8 - 3	Kelvingrove
2/14	Mohawks	7 - 3	Fife Flyers
2/15	Dundee Tigers	2 - 2	Perth Panthers
2/18	Perth Panthers	1 - 1	Dundee Tigers
2/21	Dundee Tigers	3 - 3	Mohawks
2/23	Fife Flyers	9 - 1	Falkirk Lions
2/24	Mohawks	7 - 2	Kelvingrove
2/25	Perth Panthers	9 - 2	Fife Flyers
3/1	Dundee Tigers	6 - 4	Mohawks
3/1	Kelvingrove	4 - 4	Falkirk Lions
3/2	Dundee Tigers	6 - 4	Fife Flyers
3/4	Perth Panthers	8 - 3	Mohawks
3/5	Perth Panthers	4 - 1	Mohawks
3/7	Kelvingrove	8 - 3	Fife Flyers
3/8	Falkirk Lions	5 - 5	Perth Panthers
3/9	Fife Flyers	3 - 3	Kelvingrove
3/10	Mohawks	5 - 4	Falkirk Lions
3/11	Fife Flyers	3 - 2	Perth Panthers
3/14	Dundee Tigers	2 - 0	Kelvingrove
3/15	Fife Flyers	9 - 3	Falkirk Lions
3/16	Fife Flyers	10 - 2	Falkirk Lions
3/18	Kelvingrove	2 - 1	Perth Panthers
3/21	Mohawks	3 - 3	Kelvingrove
3/22	Dundee Tigers	6 - 3	Falkirk Lions
3/23	Fife Flyers	7 - 6	Mohawks
3/29	Kelvingrove	2 - 2	Falkirk Lions
4/1	Perth Panthers	4 - 1	Mohawks
4/4	Kelvingrove	4 - 2	Falkirk Lions
4/5	Fife Flyers	5 - 3	Dundee Tigers
4/6	Dundee Tigers	4 - 1	Fife Flyers
4/7	Kelvingrove	2 - 2	Mohawks
4/8	Perth Panthers	4 - 3	Falkirk Lions
4/12	Falkirk Lions	11 - 2	Mohawks
4/12	Perth Panthers	6 - 5*	Dundee Tigers
4/14	Perth Panthers	1 - 1*	Dundee Tigers
4/19	Dundee Tigers	6 - 6	Kelvingrove
4/25	Kelvingrove	7 - 4	Falkirk Lions
4/26	Mohawks	6 - 4	Falkirk Lions
4/27	Fife Flyers	5 - 3	Perth Panthers
4/28	Dundee Tigers	10 - 3	Mohawks
4/29	Perth Panthers	10 - 0	Kelvingrove
4/29	Falkirk Lions	11 - 9	Dundee Tigers

(Note: *Matches awarded to the Dundee Tigers as the Perth Panthers used an illegal player.)

Table

	Club	GP	W	L	T	GF–GA	Pts
1.	Dundee Tigers	20	12	2	6	102:64	30
2.	Perth Panthers	20	11	6	3	80:46	25
3.	Fife Flyers	20	10	7	3	91:75	23
4.	Kelvingrove	20	5	8	7	56:86	17
5.	Glasgow Mohawks	20	5	11	4	68:95	14
6.	Falkirk Lions	20	3	12	5	76:107	11

== Mitchell Trophy ==
=== Results ===
Team 1	Team 2	Score	Round
Fife Flyers	Perth Panthers	2:1	1st
Kelvingrove	Falkirk Lions	4:3	1st
Dundee Tigers	Fife Flyers	6:4 OT	Semis
Glasgow Mohawks	Kelvingrove	3:2	Semis
Dundee Tigers	Glasgow Mohawks	2:1	Final

== President's Pucks ==
=== Results ===
Team 1	Team 2	Score	Round
Glasgow Mohawks	Falkirk Lions	4:2	1st
Fife Flyers	Dundee Tigers	5:1	1st
Glasgow Mohawks	Kelvingrove	7:2	Semis
Perth Panthers	Fife Flyers	5:1	Semis
Perth Panthers	Glasgow Mohawks	6:3	Final

== Simpson Trophy ==
=== Results ===
Team 1	Team 2	1st Leg	2nd Leg	Agg.
Dundee Tigers	Perth Panthers	4-3	3-1	7-4
Dundee Tigers	Falkirk Lions	8-5	3-4	11-9
Fife Flyers	Glasgow Select	7-0	6-4	13-4
Falkirk Lions	Glasgow Select	7-2	6-2	13-4
Dundee Tigers	Glasgow Select	4-4	6-1	10-5
Perth Panthers	Glasgow Select	5-1	4-3	9-4
Perth Panthers	Falkirk Lions	3-2	9-6	12-8
Fife Flyers	Falkirk Lions	3-4	8-5	11-9
Fife Flyers	Perth Panthers	3-4	5-7	8-11*
Fife Flyers	Dundee Tigers	5-3	2-3	7-6

Note: * Panthers were forced to forfeit after playing Earl Nicholson, a player signed from the Harringay Racers, without the permission of the SIHA

Standings

	Club	GP	W	L	T	Pts
1.	Fife Flyers	4	4	0	0	8
2.	Dundee Tigers	4	3	0	1	6
3.	Perth Panthers	4	2	2	0	4
4.	Falkirk Lions	4	1	3	0	2
5.	Glasgow Select	4	0	4	0	0

== Coronation Cup ==
Stage	Winning Team	Score	Losing Team
First Round	Perth Panthers	3-2	Kelvingrove
First Round	Glasgow Mohawks	2-0	Glasgow Lions
Semi-Final	Perth Panthers	2-1	Glasgow Mohawks
Semi-Final	Perth Black Hawks	3-2	Glasgow Mustangs
Final	Perth Panthers	3-2	Perth Black Hawks

== International competition ==
Great Britain competed at the 1939 Ice Hockey World Championships in Switzerland. In the final tournament before the outbreak of the Second World War, Great Britain progressed through the first round with victories over Belgium and Hungary, before a winless second round group with Canada, Germany and Czechoslovakia. Further defeats to Hungary and Germany, as well as a loss against Poland in the placing round, saw the British relinquish the European championship.

== Varsity Match ==
Cambridge University defeated Oxford University 2-0 in the Ice Hockey Varsity Match at the Earl's Court Exhibition Centre.
