= 1937–38 British Ice Hockey season =

- Sport: ice hockey

Seasons
- ← 1936–37 1938–39 →

The 1937–38 British Ice Hockey season featured the English National League and the Scottish National League.

== English National Tournament ==
=== Results ===
Group A

| | Club | GP | W | L | T | GF–GA | Pts |
|---|---|---|---|---|---|---|---|
| 1. | Wembley Monarchs | 12 | 7 | 4 | 1 | 32:29 | 15 |
| 2. | Harringay Racers | 12 | 5 | 3 | 4 | 34:30 | 14 |
| 3. | Earls Court Rangers | 12 | 3 | 4 | 5 | 40:35 | 11 |
| 4. | Streatham | 12 | 4 | 8 | 0 | 28:45 | 8 |

Group B

| | Club | GP | W | L | T | GF–GA | Pts |
|---|---|---|---|---|---|---|---|
| 1. | Harringay Greyhounds | 12 | 9 | 2 | 1 | 47:28 | 19 |
| 2. | Wembley Lions | 12 | 4 | 3 | 5 | 45:33 | 13 |
| 3. | Brighton Tigers | 12 | 1 | 9 | 2 | 24:50 | 4 |

Semi-Finals

- Wembley Monarchs - Wembley Lions 3:3, 2:3
- Harringay Greyhounds - Harringay Racers 1:1, 1:4

Final

- Wembley Lions - Harringay Racers 4:2, 5:2

== London Cup ==
=== Results ===
First round

- Earls Court Rangers - Richmond Hawks 4:2, 1:2
- Wembley Lions - Harringay Greyhounds 2:1, 1:0
- Harringay Racers - Streatham 5:2, 3:2
- Wembley Monarchs - Earls Court Royals 7:4, 6:2

Semi-Finals

- Harringay Racers - Wembley Lions 2:1, 3:0
- Wembley Monarchs - Earls Court Rangers 5:2, 4:3

Final

- Harringay Racers - Wembley Monarchs 6:1, 3:3

== Scottish National League ==
Perth Panthers won the Scottish National League championship and received the Canada Cup.

Scores

| Date | Team 1 | Score | Team 2 |
|---|---|---|---|
| 10/1 | Mohawks | 3 - 1 | Lions |
| 10/5 | Perth Black Hawks | 7 - 1 | Mustangs |
| 10/6 | Perth Panthers | 5 - 0 | Kelvingrove |
| 10/8 | Perth Black Hawks | 6 - 0 | Lions |
| 10/12 | Perth Panthers | 10 - 0 | Mustangs |
| 10/13 | Mohawks | 1 - 1 | Kelvingrove |
| 10/15 | Mustangs | 6 - 1 | Lions |
| 10/19 | Perth Panthers | 2 - 1 | Mohawks |
| 10/22 | Perth Black Hawks | 8 - 5 | Kelvingrove |
| 10/22 | Perth Panthers | 15 - 3 | Lions |
| 10/27 | Kelvingrove | 3 - 1 | Mustangs |
| 10/28 | Perth Black Hawks | 3 - 2 | Mohawks |
| 10/30 | Lions | 2 - 1 | Kelvingrove |
| 11/2 | Mohawks | 6 - 0 | Mustangs |
| 11/5 | Mohawks | 6 - 4 | Lions |
| 11/5 | Perth Panthers | 7 - 5 | Perth Black Hawks |
| 11/9 | Perth Black Hawks | 3 - 1 | Mustangs |
| 11/10 | Perth Panthers | 7 - 2 | Kelvingrove |
| 11/15 | Lions | 4 - 3 | Perth Black Hawks |
| 11/19 | Mohawks | 2 - 2 | Kelvingrove |
| 11/19 | Perth Panthers | 6 - 4 | Mustangs |
| 11/23 | Mustangs | 2 - 1 | Lions |
| 12/24 | Perth Panthers | 10 - 4 | Mohawks |
| 11/26 | Perth Black Hawks | 3 - 0 | Kelvingrove |
| 12/1 | Lions | 6 - 3 | Perth Panthers |
| 12/7 | Kelvingrove | 3 - 2 | Mustangs |
| 12/8 | Perth Black Hawks | 5 - 0 | Mohawks |
| 12/21 | Mohawks | 2 - 0 | Mustangs |
| 12/22 | Perth Panthers | 4 - 2 | Perth Black Hawks |
| 1/4 | Lions | 4 - 3 | Mohawks |
| 1/7 | Perth Panthers | 2 - 1 | Kelvingrove |
| 1/7 | Perth Black Hawks | 2 - 2 | Mustangs |
| 1/11 | Perth Black Hawks | 3 - 2 | Lions |
| 1/12 | Perth Panthers | 6 - 3 | Mustangs |
| 1/14 | Mohawks | 2 - 2 | Kelvingrove |
| 1/18 | Mustangs | 2 - 2 | Lions |
| 1/19 | Perth Panthers | 4 - 2 | Mohawks |
| 1/21 | Perth Black Hawks | 4 - 0 | Kelvingrove |
| 1/25 | Lions | 5 - 3 | Perth Panthers |
| 1/28 | Perth Black Hawks | 1 - 0 | Mohawks |
| 1/28 | Perth Panthers | 3 - 1 | Lions |
| 2/1 | Lions | 4 - 1 | Kelvingrove |
| 2/2 | Mohawks | 1 - 0 | Perth Black Hawks |
| 2/4 | Perth Black Hawks | 8 - 2 | Perth Panthers |
| 2/8 | Mohawks | 3 - 1 | Lions |
| 2/9 | Perth Black Hawks | 1 - 0 | Mustangs |
| 2/11 | Kelvingrove | 4 - 1 | Perth Panthers |
| 2/15 | Perth Black Hawks | 3 - 1 | Lions |
| 2/18 | Perth Panthers | 4 - 0 | Mustangs |
| 2/18 | Mohawks | 3 - 0 | Kelvingrove |
| 2/23 | Mustangs | 3 - 1 | Lions |
| 3/1 | Mohawks | 4 - 2 | Perth Panthers |
| 3/2 | Kelvingrove | 5 - 1 | Perth Black Hawks |
| 3/18 | Mustangs | 5 - 4 | Mohawks |
| 3/18 | Lions | 2 - 1 | Kelvingrove |
| 3/22 | Mustangs | 3 - 1 | Mohawks |
| 3/23 | Perth Black Hawks | 5 - 3 | Perth Panthers |
| 3/24 | Mohawks | 3 - 1 | Lions |
| 3/29 | Perth Black Hawks | 7 - 2 | Mustangs |
| 3/30 | Perth Panthers | 7 - 5 | Kelvingrove |
| 4/1 | Perth Black Hawks | 2 - 1 | Lions |
| 4/5 | Perth Panthers | 12 - 5 | Mustangs |
| 4/8 | Mohawks | 2 - 2 | Kelvingrove |
| 4/12 | Perth Panthers | 3 - 2 | Mohawks |
| 4/13 | Perth Black Hawks | 6 - 2 | Kelvingrove |
| 4/15 | Perth Panthers | 6 - 2 | Lions |
| 4/19 | Kelvingrove | 3 - 2 | Mustangs |
| 4/22 | Mohawks | 5 - 4 | Perth Black Hawks |
| 4/22 | Kelvingrove | 7 - 3 | Lions |
| 4/26 | Mohawks | 4 - 3 | Mustangs |
| 4/27 | Perth Panthers | 4 - 3 | Perth Black Hawks |
| 4/29 | Lions | 9 - 0 | Kelvingrove |
| 5/3 | Mustangs | 6 - 0 | Kelvingrove |
| 5/5 | Mustangs | 3 - 2 | Kelvingrove |
| 5/6 | Lions | 4 - 2 | Mustangs |

Table

| | Club | GP | W | L | T | GF–GA | Pts |
|---|---|---|---|---|---|---|---|
| 1. | Perth Panthers | 25 | 19 | 6 | 0 | 131:77 | 38 |
| 2. | Perth Black Hawks | 25 | 17 | 7 | 1 | 95:54 | 35 |
| 3. | Glasgow Mohawks | 25 | 11 | 10 | 4 | 66:63 | 26 |
| 4. | Glasgow Lions | 25 | 9 | 15 | 1 | 65:90 | 19 |
| 5. | Glasgow Mustangs | 25 | 7 | 16 | 2 | 58:95 | 16 |
| 6. | Kelvingrove | 25 | 6 | 15 | 4 | 52:88 | 16 |

== Mitchell Trophy ==
=== Results ===
| Team 1 | Team 2 | Score | Round |
|---|---|---|---|
| Perth Panthers | Glasgow Mustangs | 2:1 | 1st |
| Glasgow Lions | Kelvingrove | 6:1 | 1st |
| Perth Black Hawks | Perth Panthers | 3:2 | Semis |
| Glasgow Lions | Glasgow Mohawks | 3:0 | Semis |
| Glasgow Lions | Perth Black Hawks | 3:0 | Final |

== President's Pucks ==
=== Results ===
| Team 1 | Team 2 | Score | Round |
|---|---|---|---|
| Glasgow Mohawks | Kelvingrove | 2:1 | 1st |
| Perth Black Hawks | Perth Panthers | 6:1 | 1st |
| Glasgow Mohawks | Glasgow Lions | 2:1 | Semis |
| Perth Black Hawks | Glasgow Mustangs | 7:1 | Semis |
| Perth Black Hawks | Glasgow Mohawks | 4:1 | Final - 1st leg |
| Perth Black Hawks | Glasgow Mohawks | 0:0 | Final - 2nd leg |

== International competition ==
Great Britain competed at the 1938 Ice Hockey World Championships in Prague, Czechoslovakia. Unbeaten in the first two rounds for the second successive year, a victory against Czechoslovakia set up a final against reigning champions Canada. A 3-1 reverse meant that Canada retained the world championship, while Great Britain retained the European title.

== Varsity Match ==
Oxford University defeated Cambridge University 1-0 in the Ice Hockey Varsity Match, their first victory since 1935.

== NHL exhibition games ==
The National Hockey League's Detroit Red Wings and Montreal Canadiens played six matches split between London and Brighton in May as part of a European exhibition tour. Montreal won all of the London contests, with the Red Wings winning two and tying one in Brighton.
