= 1951–52 British Ice Hockey season =

- Sport: ice hockey

Seasons
- ← 1950–51 1952–53 →

The 1951–52 British Ice Hockey season featured the English National League and Scottish National League.

== English Autumn Cup ==
	Club	GP	W	L	T	GF	GA	Pts
1.	Streatham Royals	30	20	9	1	145	94	41
2.	Nottingham Panthers	30	17	12	1	153	139	35
3.	Earls Court Rangers	30	16	11	3	153	146	35
4.	Harringay Racers	30	14	13	3	140	148	31
5.	Wembley Lions	30	10	16	4	144	149	24
6.	Brighton Tigers	30	7	23	0	111	170	14

== Scottish National League ==
=== Regular season ===
	Club	GP	W	L	T	GF–GA	Pts
1.	Ayr Raiders	36	24	9	3	170:111	51
2.	Dundee Tigers	36	20	12	4	154:140	44
3.	Falkirk Lions	36	19	14	3	166:138	41
4.	Perth Panthers	36	16	17	3	164:166	35
5.	Dunfermline Vikings	36	14	17	5	155:156	33
6.	Paisley Pirates	36	10	21	5	139:197	25
7.	Fife Flyers	36	9	22	5	129:169	23

=== Playoffs ===
Stage	Team	Agg.	1st Leg	2nd Leg	Team
Semi-Final	Falkirk Lions	9-7	6-1	3-6	Dundee Tigers
Semi-Final	Ayr Raiders	7-10	4-1	3-9	Perth Panthers
Final	Falkirk Lions	8-6	6-4	2-2	Perth Panthers

== Scottish Autumn Cup ==
	Club	GP	W	L	T	GF	GA	Pts
1.	Ayr Raiders	12	9	2	1	59	37	19
2.	Falkirk Lions	12	8	3	1	64	42	17
3.	Perth Panthers	12	6	6	0	55	54	12
4.	Fife Flyers	12	4	6	2	36	48	10
5.	Dundee Tigers	12	4	6	2	34	54	10
6.	Paisley Pirates	12	4	7	1	56	67	9
7.	Dunfermline Vikings	12	3	8	1	42	44	7

== Scottish Cup ==
Stage	Team	Agg.	1st Leg	2nd Leg	Team
1st Round	Ayr Raiders	11-3*	-	-	Perth Panthers
1st Round	Dundee Tigers	2-1*	-	-	Fife Flyers
1st Round	Dunfermline Vikings	9-4	-	-	Paisley Pirates
Semi-Final	Falkirk Lions	*	4-5	*	Ayr Raiders
Semi-Final	Dunfermline Vikings	12-6	3-4	9-2	Dundee Tigers
Final	Falkirk Lions	9-5	5-3	4-2	Dunfermline Vikings

* Notes:

- First round matches were single-leg ties
- Semi-final second leg was a 2+ goal win for Falkirk

== Canada Cup ==
	Club	GP	W	L	T	GF	GA	Pts
1.	Falkirk Lions	12	9	3	0	62	38	18
2.	Dundee Tigers	12	8	3	1	57	47	17
3.	Ayr Raiders	12	8	4	0	73	40	16
4.	Fife Flyers	12	6	6	0	41	47	12
5.	Perth Panthers	12	4	5	3	53	61	11
6.	Dunfermline Vikings	12	4	7	1	42	51	9
7.	Paisley Pirates	12	0	11	1	47	91	1

== International competition ==
Great Britain competed at the 1952 World Championships in Liege, Belgium. After an opening loss to Belgium, Great Britain won their next four games to finish tenth in the world rankings, behind the nine nations competing at the Olympic tournament in Oslo, Norway.

== Varsity Match ==
Cambridge University beat Oxford University 8-2 in the varsity match, their first varsity victory since 1939.
