= 1953–54 Scottish National League season =

The 1953–54 Scottish National League season was the 16th and final season of the Scottish National League, the top level of ice hockey in Scotland. Seven teams participated in the league, and the Paisley Pirates won the championship.

The league merged with the English National League to form the British National League for the 1954–55 season.

== Regular season ==
| | Club | GP | W | T | L | GF–GA | Pts |
|---|---|---|---|---|---|---|---|
| 1. | Paisley Pirates | 60 | 44 | 8 | 8 | 285:139 | 96 |
| 2. | Perth Panthers | 60 | 38 | 2 | 20 | 281:199 | 78 |
| 3. | Falkirk Lions | 60 | 33 | 8 | 19 | 241:187 | 74 |
| 4. | Edinburgh Capitals | 60 | 24 | 12 | 24 | 205:221 | 60 |
| 5. | Ayr Raiders | 60 | 24 | 6 | 30 | 238:252 | 54 |
| 6. | Dundee Tigers | 60 | 15 | 7 | 38 | 276:367 | 37 |
| 7. | Fife Flyers | 60 | 8 | 5 | 47 | 186:347 | 21 |
