= 1952–53 British Ice Hockey season =

- Sport: ice hockey

Seasons
- ← 1951–52 1953–54 →

The 1952–53 British Ice Hockey season featured the English National League and Scottish National League.

== English Autumn Cup ==
=== Results ===
	Club	GP	W	L	T	GF	GA	Pts
1.	Harringay Racers	30	20	8	2	162	107	42
2.	Streatham Royals	30	16	9	5	171	127	37
3.	Wembley Lions	30	13	13	4	159	158	30
4.	Nottingham Panthers	30	13	15	2	151	174	28
5.	Earls Court Rangers	30	12	16	2	155	164	26
6.	Brighton Tigers	30	6	19	5	113	181	17

== Scottish National League ==
=== Regular season ===
	Club	GP	W	L	T	GF–GA	Pts
1.	Ayr Raiders	28	14	9	5	103:83	33
2.	Dunfermline Vikings	28	14	9	5	106:86	33
3.	Perth Panthers	28	15	11	2	106:94	32
4.	Falkirk Lions	28	13	10	5	96:86	31
5.	Paisley Pirates	28	12	13	3	112:115	27
6.	Edinburgh Royals	28	12	14	2	88:92	26
7.	Fife Flyers	28	8	15	5	79:100	21
8.	Dundee Tigers	28	9	16	3	97:129	21

=== Playoffs ===
Semifinals

- Dunfermline Vikings - Falkirk Lions 7:6 on aggregate (4:3, 3:3)
- Ayr Raiders - Perth Panthers 10:3 on aggregate (7:1, 3:2)

Final

- Ayr Raiders - Dunfermline Vikings 8:6 on aggregate (5:5, 3:1)

== Scottish Autumn Cup ==
=== Results ===
	Club	GP	W	L	T	GF	GA	Pts
1.	Dunfermline Vikings	14	9	3	2	59	41	20
2.	Dundee Tigers	14	9	3	2	64	56	20
3.	Falkirk Lions	14	9	4	1	46	43	19
4.	Ayr Raiders	14	5	5	4	60	44	14
5.	Fife Flyers	14	4	6	4	46	53	12
6.	Paisley Pirates	14	5	9	0	62	71	10
7.	Edinburgh Royals	14	3	8	3	57	62	9
8.	Perth Panthers	14	3	9	2	68	92	8

== Canada Cup ==
=== Results ===
	Club	GP	W	L	T	GF	GA	Pts
1.	Falkirk Lions	14	10	4	0	48	50	20
2.	Ayr Raiders	14	9	5	0	62	39	18
3.	Paisley Pirates	14	7	5	2	67	53	16
4.	Edinburgh Royals	14	7	6	1	55	46	15
5.	Perth Panthers	14	6	5	3	63	60	13
6.	Dunfermline Vikings	14	5	7	2	41	48	12
7.	Dundee Tigers	14	3	8	3	50	69	9
8.	Fife Flyers	14	2	9	3	40	61	7
