= Art Hodgins =

Canadian ice hockey player

- Born: November 17, 1927 Timmins, Ontario, Canada
- Died: March , 1988 (aged 60) Nottingham, England
- Position: Defence
- Played for: Paisley Pirates; Streatham Royals; Harringay Racers; Brighton Tigers; Nottingham Panthers; Altrincham Aces; Diavoli HC Milano; Wembley Lions
- Playing career: 1946–1968

Arthur "Art" Hodgins (November 17, 1927 – c. March 1988), also known as The Timmins Tiger and Husky Hodgins, was a Canadian ice hockey player who was born in Timmins, Ontario. He played mainly in the United Kingdom and is a member of the British Ice Hockey Hall of Fame.

== Career ==
Hodgins crossed the Atlantic in 1946 to play for the Paisley Pirates, after answering an advertisement in a Timmins newspaper. At the end of his first season in Scotland he was voted 'Rookie of the Year'. He played a second season for Paisley before being taken to England by Harvey "Red" Stapleford to join the Streatham Royals of the English National League. In England he was again named 'Rookie of the Year' becoming the only player to receive he award on both sides of the border. Hodgins was the only player to be retained by Stapleford when he rebuilt Streatham in 1950 and at 23 was made Captain. It was around this time that the NHL's New York Rangers tabled an offer of $7500 to sign Hodgins but he chose to stay with his best friend and mentor Red Stapleford at Streatham. He remained with Streatham until the rink closed its doors to ice hockey in 1954. He then joined the Harringay Racers in the inaugural season of the British National League.

After a short retirement due to sinus trouble Hodgins signed for the Nottingham Panthers in 1959–60 after a brief spell with the Brighton Tigers. In 1961 he was appointed player-coach of the newly formed Altrincham Aces. He then went to play for Milan in Italy. It was in Milan where Hodgins earned his other nickname, "Il Leone" or "The Lion". During a game he received a stick to the face, shattering his nose, and left the ice for treatment. Convinced this was the last they would see of him the Milanese crowd were amazed to see him take to the ice minutes later to shore up the defence.

Hodgins returned to Britain when the Wembley Arena re-opened its doors to hockey in 1963 with the Wembley Lions. He finally retired when the Lions folded in 1968 a year after the birth of his son Richard.

== Personal life ==
Hodgins died of lung cancer in March 1988 in Nottingham, England. He was elected posthumously into the British Ice Hockey Hall of Fame in 1989.

== Awards ==
- Named to the Scottish National League All-star A Team in 1946–47 and 1947–48.
- Named to the English National League All-star A Team in 1948–49 and 1950–51.
- Named to the English National League All-star B Team in 1951–52 and 1952–53.
- Named to the British National League All-star A Team in 1954–55.
- Named to the British National League All-star B Team in 1959–60.
- Named to the Non League English 'Home' Tournament (All-star) A Team in 1963–64.

== Career statistics ==
| All British competitions | | | | |
| GP | G | A | Pts | PIM |
|---|---|---|---|---|
| 659 | 86 | 176 | 262 | 665 |
