= 1951–52 Scottish National League season =

The 1951-52 Scottish National League season was the 14th season of the Scottish National League, the top level of ice hockey in Scotland at the time. Seven teams participated in the league, and the Ayr Raiders won the championship.

== Regular season ==
	Club	GP	W	T	L	GF–GA	Pts
1.	Ayr Raiders	60	41	4	15	302:188	86
2.	Falkirk Lions	60	36	4	20	292:218	76
3.	Dundee Tigers	60	32	7	21	245:241	71
4.	Perth Panthers	60	26	6	28	272:281	58
5.	Dunfermline Vikings	60	21	7	32	239:251	49
6.	Fife Flyers	60	19	7	34	206:264	45
7.	Paisley Pirates	60	14	7	39	242:355	35
