= 1953–54 British Ice Hockey season =

- Sport: ice hockey

Seasons
- ← 1952–53 1954–55 →

The 1953–54 British Ice Hockey season featured the English National League and Scottish National League.

== English Autumn Cup ==
=== Results ===
	Club	GP	W	L	T	GF	GA	Pts
1.	Brighton Tigers	24	15	6	3	123	69	33
2.	Streatham Royals	24	10	9	5	121	133	25
3.	Harringay Racers	24	9	11	4	115	126	22
4.	Wembley Lions	24	8	11	5	107	127	21
5.	Nottingham Panthers	24	9	14	1	104	115	19

== London Cup ==
=== Results ===
	Club	GP	W	L	T	GF	GA	Pts
1.	Streatham Royals	12	9	2	1	68	47	19
2.	Harringay Racers	12	6	6	0	63	58	12
3.	Brighton Tigers	12	4	7	1	64	66	9
4.	Nottingham Panthers	12	3	7	2	46	70	8

== Scottish National League ==
=== Regular season ===
	Club	GP	W	L	T	GF–GA	Pts
1.	Paisley Pirates	36	27	5	4	181:83	58
2.	Falkirk Lions	36	19	11	5	154:127	44
3.	Perth Panthers	36	21	14	1	167:123	43
4.	Edinburgh Royals	36	14	13	9	133:130	37
5.	Ayr Raiders	36	15	18	3	153:164	33
6.	Dundee Tigers	36	9	21	6	183:235	24
7.	Fife Flyers	36	5	28	3	119:228	13

=== Playoffs ===
Semi-Finals

- Paisley Pirates - Perth Panthers 5:2, 5:7, 3:5
- Falkirk Lions - Edinburgh Royals 4:3, 6:4

Final

- Falkirk Lions - Perth Panthers 10:6, 3:2

== Scottish Autumn Cup ==
=== Results ===
	Club	GP	W	L	T	GF	GA	Pts
1.	Paisley Pirates	12	9	1	2	57	23	20
2.	Perth Panthers	12	9	2	1	61	30	19
3.	Falkirk Lions	12	6	5	1	37	33	13
4.	Edinburgh Royals	12	6	5	1	38	44	13
5.	Ayr Raiders	12	5	6	1	43	43	11
6.	Dundee Tigers	12	2	10	0	38	71	4
7.	Fife Flyers	12	2	10	0	33	63	4

== Canada Cup ==
=== Results ===
	Club	GP	W	L	T	GF	GA	Pts
1.	Paisley Pirates	12	8	2	2	47	33	18
2.	Falkirk Lions	12	8	3	1	50	27	17
3.	Perth Panthers	12	8	4	0	53	46	16
4.	Ayr Raiders	12	4	6	2	42	45	10
5.	Edinburgh Royals	12	4	6	2	34	47	10
6.	Dundee Tigers	12	4	7	1	55	61	9
7.	Fife Flyers	12	1	9	2	34	56	4

== Scottish Cup ==
=== Results ===
First round

- 10/13/53: Ayr Raiders - Fife Flyers 9:5
- 10/19/53: Falkirk Lions - Dundee Tigers 9:8
- 10/20/53: Perth Panthers - Edinburgh Royals

Semi-Finals

- Falkirk Lions - Paisley Pirates 13:3 on aggregate (10:2 on 12/9, 3:1 on 12/14)
- Perth Panthers - Ayr Raiders 14:6 on aggregate (6:1 on 12/22, 8:5 on 12/28)

Final

- Perth Panthers - Falkirk Lions 15:14 on aggregate (9:5 on 2/16, 6:9 on 3/1)
