= 1954–55 British National League season =

British ice hockey season

The 1954–55 British National League season was the first season of the ice hockey British National League. Eleven teams participated in the league, and the Harringay Racers won the championship. The Dunfermline Vikings withdrew from the league after eleven games.

== Regular season ==
	Club	GP	W	T	L	GF–GA	Pts
1.	Harringay Racers	40	30	2	8	273:166	62
2.	Nottingham Panthers	40	25	5	10	224:152	55
3.	Paisley Pirates	40	24	4	12	200:143	52
4.	Falkirk Lions	40	21	7	12	190:156	49
5.	Wembley Lions	40	17	4	19	175:185	38
6.	Edinburgh Royals	40	15	4	21	175:181	34
7.	Perth Panthers	40	12	8	20	161:221	32
8.	Brighton Tigers	40	13	6	21	200:209	32
9.	Fife Flyers	40	13	3	24	150:215	29
10.	Dundee Tigers	40	13	3	24	146:211	29
11.	Ayr Raiders	40	11	6	23	168:223	28
