= 1954–55 British Ice Hockey season =

Sports season

- Sport: ice hockey

Seasons
- ← 1953–54 1955–56 →

The 1954–55 British Ice Hockey season featured a new British National League whereby the English and Scottish teams merged into a single league.

== Autumn Cup ==
=== Results ===
	Club	GP	W	L	T	GF	GA	Pts
1.	Harringay Racers	22	15	3	4	139	80	34
2.	Falkirk Lions	22	13	5	4	119	72	30
3.	Paisley Pirates	22	13	6	3	94	52	29
4.	Edinburgh Royals	22	12	8	2	106	77	26
5.	Ayr Raiders	22	10	10	2	108	100	22
6.	Nottingham Panthers	22	9	9	4	111	95	22
7.	Wembley Lions	22	9	10	3	91	102	21
8.	Brighton Tigers	22	8	10	4	83	97	20
9.	Perth Panthers	22	8	12	2	89	117	18
10.	Fife Flyers	22	9	13	0	77	112	18
11.	Dundee Tigers	22	7	12	3	82	118	17
12.	Dunfermline Vikings	22	2	17	3	64	141	7

== London Cup ==
=== Results ===
	Club	GP	W	L	T	GF	GA	Pts
1.	Streatham Royals	12	9	2	1	68	47	19
2.	Harringay Racers	12	6	6	0	63	58	12
3.	Brighton Tigers	12	4	7	1	64	66	9
4.	Nottingham Panthers	12	3	7	2	46	70	8

== Scottish Cup ==
=== Results ===
First round

- Paisley Pirates - Perth Panthers (4:4, win for Paisley)

Semi-Finals

- Paisley Pirates - Dunfermline Vikings (14:3, ?)
- Falkirk Lions - Ayr Raiders 12:1 on aggregate (3:0, 9:1)

Final

- Paisley Pirates - Falkirk Lions 6:5 on aggregate (3:3, 3:2 OT)
