= 1952–53 Scottish National League season =

The 1952-53 Scottish National League season was the 15th and penultimate season of the Scottish National League, the top level of ice hockey in Scotland at the time. Eight teams participated in the league, and the Falkirk Lions won the championship.

== Regular season ==
	Club	GP	W	T	L	GF–GA	Pts
1.	Falkirk Lions	56	32	6	18	190:179	70
2.	Ayr Raiders	56	28	9	19	225:166	65
3.	Dunfermline Vikings	56	28	9	19	206:177	65
4.	Paisley Pirates	56	24	5	27	241:239	53
5.	Perth Panthers	56	24	7	25	237:246	53
6.	Dundee Tigers	56	21	8	27	211:254	50
7.	Edinburgh Royals	56	22	6	28	200:200	50
8.	Fife Flyers	56	14	12	30	165:214	40
