= George Beach =

Canadian ice hockey player

- Born: October 4, 1926 (age 100) Regina, Saskatchewan, Canada
- Position: Centre
- Shot: Right
- Played for: Kansas City Pla-Mors; Wembley Lions; Wembley Monarchs; HC Milano; HC Martigny; Zürcher SC; Brighton Tigers; Harringay Racers; Nottingham Panthers; Southampton Vikings
- Playing career: 1945–1967

George Beach (born October 4, 1926-2016) was a professional ice hockey centre who played in the English National League and its successor, the British National League, during the 1940s and 1950s.

== Professional career ==
Beach was born in Regina, Saskatchewan, Canada. While a teenager, George Beach was spotted by an NHL scout who recommended him to the Chicago Black Hawks. After attending a Black Hawks training camp Beach was assigned to the Kansas City Pla-Mors in the USHL.

In 1947, George Beach left the United States to join the Wembley Lions in the English National League before spending the 1948–49 and 1949–50 seasons with the Wembley Monarchs. Beach rejoined the Lions after the Monarchs folded at the end of the 1949–50 season.

In 1954–55, Beach went to play and coach for HC Milano in the Italian Serie A before moving to HC Martigny in Switzerland. Beach stayed with Martigny until he moved to Zürcher SC in Zürich for the 1958–59 season. While playing in Europe Beach would return to the UK to play for British teams during the play-offs after the European leagues' seasons had finished. These teams included the Brighton Tigers, Harringay Racers and Nottingham Panthers.

Beach returned to the Wembley Lions for the 1959–60 season. Beach played as a guest for various teams following the demise of the BNL before he signed for the Southampton Vikings in 1961. In 1962–63 Beach became the Vikings' player/coach before he returned to the Wembley Lions, playing intermittently between 1963 and 1968.

Beach retired from playing ice hockey in 1971 after playing briefly with a Wembley Vets side in the Southern League.

In 1976, Beach coached the Great Britain national ice hockey team in the Pondus Cup held in Denmark and in Pool C of the Ice Hockey World Championships.

George Beach died, aged 90 years and 2 months, in Exmouth, Devon, on 12 December 2016. He was a Provincial Grand Officer (PPrGAlm) in the Masonic Province of Middlesex; Past Master of Ickenham Lodge No. 5770, of which he became an Honorary Member in April 2016.

== Awards and recognition ==
- Named to the ENL All-star A Team in 1950.
- Named to the ENL All-star B Team in 1951.
- Named to the BNL All-Star B Team in 1960.
- Inducted to the British Ice Hockey Hall of Fame in 1989.
