= 1939–40 British Ice Hockey season =

- Sport: ice hockey

Seasons
- ← 1938–39 1946–47 →

The 1939–40 British Ice Hockey season featured the English National League and the Scottish National League. This was the final season of both competitions following the outbreak of the Second World War, both competitions would not resume until 1946.

== Scottish National League ==
=== Points Competition ===
Scores

Date	Team 1	Score	Team 2
10/30	Dunfermline Vikings	2 - 2	Dundee Tigers
11/1	Fife Flyers	5 - 1	Falkirk Lions
11/1	Dundee Tigers	7 - 2	Ayr Raiders
11/2	Fife Flyers	1 - 1	Perth Panthers
11/3	Ayr Raiders	2 - 2	Dunfermline Vikings
11/4	Perth Panthers	6 - 4	Falkirk Lions
11/6	Fife Flyers	3 - 2	Dunfermline Vikings
11/8	Ayr Raiders	4 - 2	Falkirk Lions
11/8	Perth Panthers	4 - 2	Dundee Tigers
11/9	Fife Flyers	4 - 2	Dunfermline Vikings
11/10	Ayr Raiders	7 - 4	Falkirk Lions
11/11	Dundee Tigers	2 - 2	Perth Panthers
11/13	Dunfermline Vikings	2 - 1	Ayr Raiders
11/15	Falkirk Lions	3 - 1	Perth Panthers
11/15	Dundee Tigers	3 - 3	Dunfermline Vikings
11/16	Fife Flyers	4 - 2	Falkirk Lions
11/17	Dundee Tigers	3 - 2	Ayr Raiders
11/18	Perth Panthers	5 - 3	Fife Flyers
11/20	Dunfermline Vikings	5 - 3	Perth Panthers
11/22	Falkirk Lions	5 - 1	Dundee Tigers
11/22	Fife Flyers	3 - 2	Ayr Raiders
11/23	Fife Flyers	4 - 3	Dundee Tigers
11/24	Falkirk Lions	3 - 2	Dunfermline Vikings
11/25	Perth Panthers	3 - 1	Ayr Raiders
11/27	Falkirk Lions	3 - 2	Dunfermline Vikings
11/29	Dundee Tigers	4 - 3	Falkirk Lions
11/29	Ayr Raiders	0 - 0	Perth Panthers
11/30	Fife Flyers	6 - 5	Ayr Raiders
12/2	Perth Panthers	4 - 1	Dunfermline Vikings
12/2	Dundee Tigers	4 - 0	Fife Flyers
12/4	Dundee Tigers	5 - 3	Dunfermline Vikings
12/6	Falkirk Lions	4 - 2	Fife Flyers
12/6	Ayr Raiders	6 - 5	Dundee Tigers
12/7	Perth Panthers	4 - 1	Fife Flyers
12/8	Ayr Raiders	3 - 3	Dunfermline Vikings
12/9	Perth Panthers	4 - 2	Falkirk Lions
12/11	Dunfermline Vikings	3 - 2	Fife Flyers
12/13	Perth Panthers	4 - 1	Dundee Tigers
12/13	Falkirk Lions	4 - 0	Ayr Raiders
12/14	Dunfermline Vikings	3 - 2	Fife Flyers
12/15	Falkirk Lions	3 - 2	Ayr Raiders
12/16	Perth Panthers	5 - 3	Dundee Tigers
12/18	Ayr Raiders	4 - 3	Dunfermline Vikings
12/20	Perth Panthers	1 - 0	Falkirk Lions
12/20	Dunfermline Vikings	6 - 3	Dundee Tigers
12/21	Fife Flyers	5 - 3	Falkirk Lions
12/22	Dundee Tigers	3 - 2	Ayr Raiders
12/23	Perth Panthers	2 - 1	Fife Flyers
12/25	Dunfermline Vikings	2 - 0	Perth Panthers
12/27	Falkirk Lions	8 - 5	Dundee Tigers
12/28	Dundee Tigers	6 - 6	Fife Flyers
12/29	Falkirk Lions	2 - 2	Dunfermline Vikings
12/29	Ayr Raiders	4 - 1	Fife Flyers
12/30	Ayr Raiders	4 - 2	Perth Panthers
1/1	Falkirk Lions	2 - 2	Dunfermline Vikings
1/3	Falkirk Lions	2 - 2	Dundee Tigers
1/4	Ayr Raiders	2 - 2	Fife Flyers
1/5	Ayr Raiders	4 - 3	Perth Panthers
1/6	Perth Panthers	9 - 3	Dunfermline Vikings
1/6	Fife Flyers	3 - 1	Dundee Tigers

Table

	Club	GP	W	L	T	GF–GA	Pts
1.	Perth Panthers	20	12	5	3	63:43	27
2.	Fife Flyers	20	9	8	3	58:59	21
3.	Falkirk Lions	20	8	9	3	60:61	19
4.	Ayr Raiders	20	7	9	4	57:61	18
5.	Dunfermline Vikings	20	6	8	6	53:60	18
6.	Dundee Tigers	20	6	9	5	65:72	17

=== Regular season ===
Scores

Date	Team 1	Score	Team 2
1/15	Dunfermline Vikings	5 - 5	Dundee Tigers
1/17	Dundee Tigers	8 - 5	Ayr Raiders
1/17	Falkirk Lions	6 - 4	Fife Flyers
1/18	Fife Flyers	11 - 5	Perth Panthers
1/19	Dunfermline Vikings	4 - 2	Ayr Raiders
1/20	Falkirk Lions	6 - 1	Perth Panthers
1/22	Fife Flyers	8 - 3	Dunfermline Vikings
1/24	Ayr Raiders	4 - 3	Falkirk Lions
1/24	Dundee Tigers	3 - 1	Perth Panthers
1/25	Fife Flyers	7 - 5	Dunfermline Vikings
1/26	Ayr Raiders	6 - 2	Falkirk Lions
1/27	Dundee Tigers	8 - 3	Perth Panthers
2/5	Ayr Raiders	8 - 6	Dunfermline Vikings
2/7	Falkirk Lions	2 - 1	Perth Panthers
2/7	Dundee Tigers	8 - 8	Dunfermline Vikings
2/8	Falkirk Lions	7 - 4	Fife Flyers
2/9	Dundee Tigers	6 - 1	Ayr Raiders
2/10	Fife Flyers	4 - 2	Perth Panthers
2/12	Dunfermline Vikings	7 - 2	Perth Panthers
2/14	Falkirk Lions	12 - 6	Dundee Tigers
2/15	Fife Flyers	8 - 5	Dundee Tigers
2/16	Ayr Raiders	4 - 3	Fife Flyers
2/16	Dunfermline Vikings	6 - 5	Falkirk Lions
2/17	Ayr Raiders	3 - 1	Perth Panthers
2/21	Falkirk Lions	5 - 5	Dundee Tigers
2/22	Fife Flyers	6 - 1	Ayr Raiders
2/23	Perth Panthers	6 - 1	Ayr Raiders
2/24	Dundee Tigers	12 - 6	Fife Flyers
2/24	Perth Panthers	3 - 1	Dunfermline Vikings
2/26	Perth Panthers	1 - 1	Dunfermline Vikings
2/28	Dundee Tigers	12 - 3	Falkirk Lions
2/29	Fife Flyers	5 - 3	Dundee Tigers
3/1	Fife Flyers	8 - 5	Ayr Raiders
3/2	Perth Panthers	4 - 2	Ayr Raiders
3/4	Fife Flyers	8 - 3	Dunfermline Vikings
3/6	Falkirk Lions	4 - 3	Ayr Raiders
3/6	Perth Panthers	2 - 2	Dundee Tigers
3/7	Fife Flyers	8 - 2	Dunfermline Vikings
3/8	Falkirk Lions	5 - 4	Ayr Raiders
3/9	Dundee Tigers	1 - 0	Perth Panthers
3/11	Ayr Raiders	11 - 6	Dunfermline Vikings
3/13	Perth Panthers	5 - 2	Falkirk Lions
3/13	Dundee Tigers	6 - 1	Dunfermline Vikings
3/14	Fife Flyers	6 - 4	Falkirk Lions
3/15	Dundee Tigers	7 - 2	Ayr Raiders
3/16	Fife Flyers	6 - 1	Perth Panthers
3/20	Dundee Tigers	4 - 4	Ayr Raiders
3/21	Perth Panthers	5 - 2	Fife Flyers
3/22	Ayr Raiders	5 - 3	Dunfermline Vikings
3/23	Falkirk Lions	3 - 2	Perth Panthers
3/25	Falkirk Lions	10 - 3	Dunfermline Vikings
3/27	Falkirk Lions	4 - 3	Dundee Tigers
3/28	Fife Flyers	8 - 4	Ayr Raiders
3/29	Perth Panthers	3 - 1	Ayr Raiders
3/30	Perth Panthers	7 - 3	Dunfermline Vikings
3/30	Fife Flyers	4 - 3	Dundee Tigers
4/8	Dunfermline Vikings	8 - 3	Dundee Tigers
4/10	Falkirk Lions	8 - 4	Fife Flyers
4/13	Falkirk Lions	7 - 5	Dunfermline Vikings
4/15	Falkirk Lions	5 - 4	Dunfermline Vikings

Table

	Club	GP	W	L	T	GF–GA	Pts
1.	Fife Flyers	20	14	6	0	120:88	28
2.	Falkirk Lions	20	13	6	1	103:88	27
3.	Dundee Tigers	20	9	6	5	110:87	23
4.	Perth Panthers	20	7	11	2	55:69	16
5.	Ayr Raiders	20	7	12	1	76:97	15
6.	Dunfermline Vikings	20	4	13	3	84:119	11

=== Scottish Ice Hockey League Championship ===
The winners of the Points Competition and the Regular Season met to decide the Scottish National League championship.

- Fife Flyers - Perth Panthers 4:4, 4:3, 5:4 - was originally going to be a five-game series, cut to three

== Scottish Cup ==
Stage	Team	1st Leg	2nd Leg	Score	Team
1st Round	Dunfermline Vikings	3-1	6-4	9-5	Fife Flyers
1st Round	Falkirk Lions	3-1	3-6	6-7	Ayr Raiders
1st Round	Dundee Tigers	5-3	TBC	TBC	Perth Panthers
2nd Round	Falkirk Lions	5-4	5-4	10-8	Dundee Tigers
Semi-Final	Dunfermline Vikings	3-1	7-4	10-5	Ayr Raiders
Semi-Final	Falkirk Lions	3-3	4-1	7-4	Perth Panthers
Final	Dunfermline Vikings	5-5	5-5	10-10	Falkirk Lions
Final Replay	Dunfermline Vikings	3-3	4-3	7-6	Falkirk Lions

== Simpson Trophy ==
Stage	Winning Team	1st Leg	2nd Leg	Score	Losing Team
1st Round	Ayr Raiders	5-3	5-5	10-8	Dunfermline Vikings
1st Round	Dundee Tigers	6-2	4-5	10-7	Fife Flyers
1st Round	Perth Panthers	4-6	4-2	8-8	Falkirk Lions
Semi-Final	Perth Panthers	4-2	4-2	8-4	Ayr Raiders
Semi-Final	Dundee Tigers	6-2	0-1	6-3	Falkirk Lions
Final	Perth Panthers	7-4	5-1	12-5	Dundee Tigers

== Coronation Cup ==
Date	Stage	Winning Team	Score	Losing Team
First Round	12/10	Falkirk Lions	2-1 OT	Glasgow Mohawks
First Round	12/10	Dundee Tigers	3-2	Fife Flyers
Semi-Final	12/24	Dundee Tigers	2-1 OT	Kelvingrove
Semi-Final	12/24	Perth Panthers	3-1	Falkirk Lions
Final	12/31	Perth Panthers	2-1	Dundee Tigers

== Varsity Match ==
Oxford University defeated Cambridge University 4-2 in the Ice Hockey Varsity Match at the Harringay Arena.
