= Johnny Carlyle =

- Born: 31 July 1929 Falkirk, Scotland
- Died: 15 April 2017 (aged 87) Larbert, Scotland
- Position: Forward / Defence
- Played for: Falkirk Lions; Harringay Racers; Edinburgh Royals; Nottingham Panthers; Brighton Tigers
- Playing career: 1946–1973

John Cumming Carlyle (31 July 1929 – 15 April 2017) was a British ice hockey player and coach. He is a member of the British Ice Hockey Hall of Fame.

== Career ==
Carlyle learned to play ice hockey in the Falkirk Lions junior system, the Falkirk Cubs, making his senior debut with the Lions at 17 years old. Following his National Service, Carlyle helped the Lions to win three Scottish National League play-off series before the club folded in 1955. Whilst with Falkirk, Carlyle had the first of his international call ups to the Great Britain when he played in the Ice Hockey World Championships in 1950 and 1951 as a forward and defender respectively.

Carlyle joined the Harringay Racers in the British National League for the 1955–56 season. He became the team captain the following season and was named to the All-star B-Team. When the Racers ceased playing in 1958, Carlyle returned to Scotland to the Edinburgh Royals. However, they too failed to see out the season and Carlyle finished the 1958–59 season playing with the Nottingham Panthers. The following season was the last of the British National League, and Carlyle spent the time playing with the Brighton Tigers.

In 1960 Carlyle took up coaching with the Edinburgh Royals and the team went on to beat all comers during the 1960–61 season. Carlyle received his first call up to coach Great Britain in 1961 when he was player-coach of the team which remained unbeaten in the Pool B tournament – although the team finished runners-up to Norway on goal difference. In the 1961–62 season, Carlyle returned to club playing as the player-coach of the Brighton Tigers. Following two successful seasons with the Tigers, Carlyle again returned to Edinburgh now renamed Murrayfield Racers. He remained in the capital for a decade and was named as the coach for the All-Star A-Team on four occasions between 1967 and 1972. Carlyle again coached Great Britain in the 1971 and 1973 Pool C tournaments.

Carlyle eventually retired from the game in 1973.

== Death ==
Johnny Carlyle died on 15 April 2017 in Larbert, Scotland.

== Awards ==
- Named as player to the All-star B-Team in 1957 and 1963.
- Named as player to the All-star A-Team in 1962.
- Named as coach to the All-star B-Team in 1962.
- Named as coach to the All-star A-Team in 1963, 1968, 1969, 1971 and 1972.
- Inducted to the British Ice Hockey Hall of Fame in 1988.
