= Autumn Cup =

Sports competition

The Autumn Cup was an ice hockey competition in the United Kingdom between 1946 and 2000. The competition was originally divided into English and Scottish competitions, known as the English Autumn Cup and the Scottish Autumn Cup between 1946 and 1954 when it became the British Autumn Cup until 1960. The competition did not take place again until 1967 when it was resurrected as the Northern Autumn Cup before it again became a national competition in 1983. Following a series of major sponsorships during the 1980s it became known as simply the Autumn Cup in 1991 before a sponsorship deal with Benson & Hedges renamed it the Benson & Hedges Cup (B&H Cup) in 1982 until their association ended in 2001 and the Autumn Cup discontinued.

The competition was contested during the opening months of each season with preliminary round games taking up the majority of the early season schedule. From 1983 finals were played at a predetermined venue with Sheffield Arena becoming the sole venue in 1991. Between 1983 and 2000, all but three finals were settled in regulation time with the 1983, 1986 and 1999 finals going into overtime and the 1983 and 1999 final being settled on penalty shots.

== Winners ==
=== English Autumn Cup ===
Year	Winner	Runner-up
1946	Brighton Tigers	Wembley Monarchs
1947	Harringay Racers	Streatham
1948	Wembley Monarchs	Harringay Racers
1949	Harringay Racers	Wembley Monarchs
1950	Brighton Tigers	Streatham
1951	Streatham	Nottingham Panthers
1952	Harringay Racers	Streatham
1953	Streatham	Brighton Tigers

=== Scottish Autumn Cup ===
Year	Winner	Runner-up
1946	Dunfermline Vikings	Paisley Pirates
1947	Paisley Pirates	Falkirk Lions
1948	Fife Flyers	Falkirk Lions
1949	Dundee Tigers	Fife Flyers
1950	Fife Flyers	Ayr Raiders
1951	Ayr Raiders	Falkirk Lions
1952	Dunfermline Vikings	Dundee Tigers
1953	Paisley Pirates	Perth Panthers

=== British Autumn Cup ===
Year	Winner	Runner-up
1954	Harringay Racers	Falkirk Lions
1955	Nottingham Panthers	Paisley Pirates
1956	Brighton Tigers	Harringay Racers
1957	Wembley Lions	Harringay Racers
1958	Brighton Tigers	Edinburgh Royals
1959	Streatham	Brighton Tigers

=== Northern Autumn Cup ===
From 1967 to 1977 the Autumn Cup only had a group stage. In 1978 and 1979 it also included semi-finals and the final.

Year	Winner	2nd place	3rd place
1967	Paisley Mohawks	Murrayfield Racers	Glasgow Dynamos
1968	Murrayfield Racers	Paisley Mohawks	Whitley Warriors
1970	Murrayfield Racers	Glasgow Dynamos	Dundee Rockets
1971	Whitley Warriors	Murrayfield Racers	Dundee Rockets
1972	Fife Flyers	Whitley Warriors	Murrayfield Racers
1974	Murrayfield Racers	Whitley Warriors	Fife Flyers
1975	Fife Flyers	Durham Wasps	Murrayfield Racers
1976	Fife Flyers	Whitley Warriors	Murrayfield Racers
1977	Murrayfield Racers	Fife Flyers	Whitley Warriors

Year	Winner	Runner-up	Score
1978	Fife Flyers	Murrayfield Racers	15–8
1979	Murrayfield Racers	Billingham Bombers	23–7

In 1980 the winner of Autumn Cup was awarded to the leaders of the Northern League at the halfway point (14 games into the season), that was the Murrayfield Racers

=== Kohler Engines Autumn Cup ===
Year	Winner	Runner-up	Score	Venue
1983	Dundee Rockets	Streatham Redskins	6-6; Rockets win on penalties	Streatham Ice Rink

=== Bluecol Autumn Cup ===
Year	Winner	Runner-up	Score	Venue
1984	Durham Wasps	Fife Flyers	6–4	Streatham Ice Rink

=== Norwich Union Trophy ===
Year	Winner	Runner-up	Score	Venue
1985	Murrayfield Racers	Durham Wasps	8–5	Murrayfield Ice Rink
1986	Nottingham Panthers	Fife Flyers	5–4; After overtime	National Exhibition Centre
1987	Durham Wasps	Murrayfield Racers	11–5	Fife Ice Arena
1988	Durham Wasps	Tayside Tigers	7–5	National Exhibition Centre
1989	Murrayfield Racers	Durham Wasps	10–4	Basingstoke Ice Rink
1990	Durham Wasps	Murrayfield Racers	12–6	Whitley Bay Ice Rink

=== Autumn Cup ===
Year	Winner	Runner-up	Score	Venue
1991	Nottingham Panthers	Humberside Seahawks	7–5	Sheffield Arena

=== Benson & Hedges Cup ===
Year	Winner	Runner-up	Score	Venue
1992	Cardiff Devils	Whitley Bay Warriors	10–4	Sheffield Arena
1993	Murrayfield Racers	Cardiff Devils	6–2	Sheffield Arena
1994	Nottingham Panthers	Cardiff Devils	7–2	Sheffield Arena
1995	Sheffield Steelers	Nottingham Panthers	5–2	Sheffield Arena
1996	Nottingham Panthers	Ayr Scottish Eagles	5–3	Sheffield Arena
1997	Ayr Scottish Eagles	Cardiff Devils	2–1	Sheffield Arena
1998	Nottingham Panthers	Ayr Scottish Eagles	2–1	Sheffield Arena
1999	Manchester Storm	London Knights	3-3; Storm win on penalties	Sheffield Arena
2000	Sheffield Steelers	Newcastle Jesters	4–0	Sheffield Arena

== Clubs by number of Autumn Cup titles ==
Club	Number of Titles	Runner-up	Last title
Murrayfield Racers	9	3	1993
Nottingham Panthers	6	2	1998
Brighton Tigers	4	2	1958
Durham Wasps	4	2	1990
Fife Flyers	4	2	1978
Harringay Racers	4	3	1954
Streatham	3	3	1959
Sheffield Steelers	2	0	2000
Ayr Scottish Eagles	1	2	1997
Cardiff Devils	1	3	1993
Dundee Rockets	1	0	1983
Manchester Storm	1	0	1999
Paisley Mohawks	1	0	1967
Wembley Lions	1	0	1957
Wembley Monarchs	1	2	1948
