= 1939–40 English National League season =

English ice hockey league season

The 1939–40 English National League season was the fifth season of the English National League, the top level ice hockey league in England. Five teams participated in the league, and the Harringay Greyhounds won the championship.

== Regular season ==
	Club	GP	W	T	L	GF–GA	Pts
1.	Harringay Greyhounds	24	13	3	8	105:81	29
2.	Harringay Racers	24	11	6	7	79:69	28
3.	Wembley Monarchs	24	11	4	9	104:116	26
4.	Wembley Lions	24	9	4	11	113:106	22
5.	Streatham	24	6	3	15	68:117	5
