= Marshall Key =

Scottish ice hockey player (1932–2016)

Marshall Key (18 June 1932 – 5 February 2016) was a Scottish professional ice hockey player who played in the Scottish National League and the British National League for the Dundee Tigers, Harringay Racers, Edinburgh Royals and the Paisley Pirates. He also played for the Great Britain national ice hockey team. Key was inducted to the British Ice Hockey Hall of Fame in 2007.

Key was born in Dundee, Scotland, on 18 June 1932. He died on 5 February 2016, aged 83.

== Sources ==
- British Ice Hockey Hall of Fame entry
