= Gerry Davey =

- Born: September 5, 1914 Port Arthur, Ontario, Canada
- Died: February 12, 1977 (aged 62) Orange County, Florida, USA
- Height: 5 ft 8 in (173 cm)
- Weight: 150 lb (68 kg; 10 st 10 lb)
- Position: Right wing
- Shot: Left
- Played for: Princes; ZSC Lions; Streatham; Falkirk Lions; Wembley Lions; Streatham Royals
- National team: Great Britain
- Playing career: 1931–1950

John Gerald Davey (September 5, 1914 – February 12, 1977) was a Canadian-born British ice hockey player who played in the English National League (ENL). He also played for the British national team that won the gold medal at the 1936 Winter Olympics (see Ice hockey at the 1936 Winter Olympics). He is a member of the British Ice Hockey Hall of Fame.

== Career ==
Born in Port Arthur, Ontario, Davey learned to play ice hockey with the Elmwood Midgets.

=== Club ===
When he was 16 years old, Davey's mother left with him to England in 1931. He got a place with the Princes club playing in the English League with the help of a London newspaper. After a short time with ZSC Lions in Switzerland, he returned to the UK to play with Streatham in 1933 before eventually moving on to play with the Falkirk Lions in the Scottish National League between 1938 and 1940, whom he also coached in 1938–39.

During World War II, Davey joined the Royal Canadian Navy continuing to play ice hockey in the Toronto Services League. After the war in 1946, Davey returned to Streatham where he took up playing in defence having previously played right wing. Davey then moved the Wembley Lions the following year for the 1947–48 season. Davey then turned his hand to refereeing before returning to playing for a brief spell during the 1949–50 season with the Streatham Royals in the Intermediate League.

=== International ===
Olympic medal record

Men's Ice Hockey
Gold medal – first place	1936 Garmisch-Partenkirchen	Team

After arriving in England, Davey made an immediate impact with the Princes club and was selected to play for the GB national team in the 1932 European Championships held in Berlin. The team finished the tournament in seventh position with Davey scoring seven of the team's eleven goals.

Davey went on to play for the GB national team at all the international tournaments between 1932 and 1939, most notably the team which took part in the 1936 Winter Olympics. Having fallen ill, Davey came back from his sick bed to score 40 seconds into the game against Canada — which GB won 2–1 — helping the team along the way to securing the gold medal.

Davey also helped the GB team to a bronze medal in the 1935 World Championships, which also earned a silver medal in the European Championships, and a silver medal in the 1937 and 1938 World Championships. Following World War II, Davey again represented GB at the 1948 Winter Olympics when they finished in sixth place.

Davey scored a total of forty-three goals for the GB national team, a record which still stands.

== Awards ==
- Olympic gold medalist in 1936.
- World Championship silver medalist in 1937 and 1938.
- European Championship gold medalist in 1937.

== Records ==
- Most goals scored for the GB national team with 43.

== Honours ==
- Inducted to the British Ice Hockey Hall of Fame in 1949.
