= Ted McCaskill =

Canadian ice hockey player

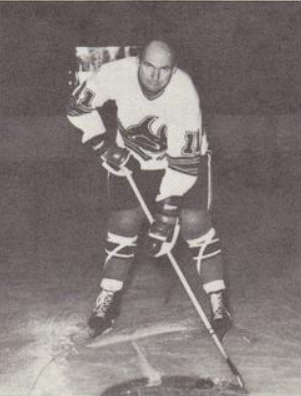
- McCaskill in 1972 photo
- Born: October 29, 1936 Kapuskasing, Ontario, Canada
- Died: March 3, 2016 (aged 79) Phoenix, Arizona, U.S.
- Height: 6 ft 1 in (185 cm)
- Weight: 195 lb (88 kg; 13 st 13 lb)
- Position: Centre
- Shot: Left
- Played for: Minnesota North Stars; Los Angeles Sharks
- Playing career: 1954–1975

Edward Joel McCaskill (October 29, 1936 – March 3, 2016) was a Canadian professional ice hockey player who played four games in the National Hockey League and 91 games in the World Hockey Association between 1968 and 1974. He played with the Minnesota North Stars, and he then served as player-coach with the Los Angeles Sharks.

== Playing career ==
McCaskill played junior hockey with the Kitchener Canucks and later on the Kapuskasing Huskies, then made the move to the UK, playing two years in the British Ice Hockey Elite League.

Upon returning to the US, he became a dominant force with the Nashville Dixie Flyers, and his offensive prowess earned the attention of NHL clubs, however, he would spend most of his playing years in the Western Hockey League with the original Vancouver Canucks and Phoenix Roadrunners.

He was the father of former Major League Baseball pitcher and minor league hockey player Kirk McCaskill.

He died in Phoenix, Arizona, in 2016 at the age of 79.

== Career statistics ==
=== Regular season and playoffs ===
			Regular season					Playoffs
Season	Team	League	GP	G	A	Pts	PIM	GP	G	A	Pts	PIM
1954–55	Kitchener Canucks	OHA	39	7	7	14	59	—	—	—	—	—
1955–56	Kitchener Canucks	OHA	16	2	2	4	8	—	—	—	—	—
1956–57	Kapuskasing Huskies	NOHA	—	—	—	—	—	—	—	—	—	—
1957–58	Kapuskasing Huskies	NOHA	—	—	—	—	—	—	—	—	—	—
1958–59	Edinburgh Royals	BNL	25	27	18	45	21	—	—	—	—	—
1959–60	Paisley Pirates	BNL	28	27	17	44	52	—	—	—	—	—
1960–61	Kapuskasing GMs	NOHA	40	32	32	64	—	—	—	—	—	—
1961–62	Kapuskasing GMs	NOHA	—	—	—	—	—	—	—	—	—	—
1962–63	Nashville Dixie Flyers	EHL	65	21	43	64	62	3	1	1	2	6
1963–64	Nashville Dixie Flyers	EHL	70	36	50	86	107	3	1	1	2	2
1964–65	Nashville Dixie Flyers	EHL	72	60	65	125	88	13	8	14	22	26
1965–66	Nashville Dixie Flyers	EHL	70	39	61	100	151	11	3	13	16	18
1966–67	Nashville Dixie Flyers	EHL	72	53	65	118	188	14	8	13	21	46
1967–68	Minnesota North Stars	NHL	4	0	2	2	0	—	—	—	—	—
1967–68	Memphis South Stars	CHL	62	17	29	46	136	3	2	0	2	0
1968–69	Memphis South Stars	CHL	5	0	0	0	6	—	—	—	—	—
1968–69	Vancouver Canucks	WHL	45	11	13	24	83	8	0	6	6	6
1969–70	Vancouver Canucks	WHL	72	24	18	42	110	11	0	2	2	47
1970–71	Phoenix Roadrunners	WHL	70	23	24	47	169	10	3	4	7	8
1971–72	Phoenix Roadrunners	WHL	71	18	37	55	237	6	1	2	3	18
1972–73	Los Angeles Sharks	WHA	73	11	11	22	150	6	2	3	5	12
1973–74	Los Angeles Sharks	WHA	18	2	2	4	63	—	—	—	—	—
1974–75	Broome Dusters	NAHL	40	14	20	34	77	15	3	10	13	—
WHA totals			91	13	13	26	213	6	2	3	5	12
NHL totals			4	0	2	2	0	—	—	—	—	—

=== WHA coaching record ===
Team	Year	Regular season						Post season
Team	Year	G	W	L	T	Pts	Division rank	Result
Los Angeles Sharks	1973-74	59	20	39	0	40	6th in West	Missed playoffs
