= George McNeil (ice hockey) =

Canadian baseball player and manager and ice hockey player and coach

- Born: July 26, 1914 Nova Scotia, Canada
- Died: December 24, 1997 (aged 83) Philadelphia, Pennsylvania, United States
- Position: Defence / Right wing
- Played for: Richmond Hawks; Brighton Tigers; Earls Court Rangers; Dundee Tigers
- Playing career: c. 1936–1940

George "Chummy" McNeil (July 26, 1914 – December 24, 1997) was a Canadian-born athlete. As an ice hockey player and coach, and as a baseball player and manager, he spent his career in the United Kingdom, which he represented internationally at both sports.

== Ice hockey ==
McNeil played for the Richmond Hawks, Brighton Tigers and Earls Court Rangers in the English National League and for the Dundee Tigers in the Scottish National League before the Second World War. He was a coach for the Tigers between 1946 and 1949 and for the Falkirk Lions between 1949 and 1954, when he retired. He was inducted into the British Ice Hockey Hall of Fame in 1956.

== Baseball ==
George McNeil
- Third baseman

Teams
- Scarborough Seagulls (1937); Hull (1937); Leeds Oaks (1938); Halifax (1939)
Medals
Men's baseball
Representing United Kingdom
Baseball World Cup
Gold medal – first place	1938 Baseball World Cup	Team

McNeil played baseball in the semi-professional Yorkshire League, 1937 and the Yorkshire-Lancashire League, 1938 and 1939 in the United Kingdom. He played regularly for the Yorkshire County representative side including against the USA Test Series side in 1938.

He started the 1937 season with Scarborough Seagulls but when they folded in August concluded the season at Hull. For the 1938 season he played third base for Leeds Oaks who he had joined as coach and captain. In August 1938, at just 24 years of age, he represented the Great Britain national baseball team as player-manager in a "Test Series" against the United States national baseball team, preparing for the 1940 Olympic Games. The British team, which consisted largely of Canadians playing baseball professionally in the UK, won the series by 4 games to 1. Subsequently, English entrepreneur and baseball executive John Moores presented a trophy for the winners, the competition and trophy becoming known as the Amateur World Series.

In the 1939 season, he captained Halifax in retaining the Yorkshire-Lancashire League Championship.
