= 1956–57 British National League season =

- Sport: ice hockey

Seasons
- ← 1955–56 1957–58 →

The 1956–57 British National League season was the third season of the British National League (1954–1960). Five teams participated in the league, and the Wembley Lions won the championship.

== British National League ==
=== Regular season ===
	Club	GP	W	T	L	GF–GA	Pts
1.	Wembley Lions	32	19	3	10	158:122	41
2.	Harringay Racers	32	15	6	11	144:136	36
3.	Brighton Tigers	32	13	7	12	138:125	33
4.	Paisley Pirates	32	11	4	17	127:142	26
5.	Nottingham Panthers	32	10	4	18	131:173	24

== Autumn Cup ==
=== Results ===
	Club	GP	W	L	T	GF	GA	Pts
1.	Brighton Tigers	24	14	6	4	111	75	32
2.	Harringay Racers	24	13	8	3	102	89	29
3.	Wembley Lions	24	10	10	4	93	81	24
4.	Paisley Pirates	24	8	14	2	74	114	18
5.	Nottingham Panthers	24	6	13	5	113	124	17
