= Falkirk Lions =

- City: Falkirk, Scotland
- League: Scottish National League
- Founded: 1938
- Operated: 1938 - 1957
- Home arena: Falkirk Ice Rink; Capacity: 4,188; Ice size: 195ft x 97ft
- Colours: Red & White
- Farm club: Falkirk Cubs

Franchise history
- 1938 - 1957: Falkirk Lions

Falkirk Lions were a Scottish ice hockey club playing out of Falkirk Ice Rink, Falkirk. Between 1938 and 1954, the Lions played in the Scottish National League, before joining the British National League for its inaugural season. The Lions joined the Scottish Amateur League the following season, remaining there until ceasing operations in 1957.

== Formation and Pre-War Period ==
The Falkirk Lions ice hockey club was formed in 1938 to play in town's newly-built ice rink. Training took place at Kirkcaldy while the rink was completed, and the team initially played all games on the road. The Lions took their name from the recently-disbanded Glasgow Lions club, and from where a number of players were signed.

In the club's debut season, the Lions won the league's Points Competition, but finished last in the regular season. In 1939–40, Falkirk recorded top-half finishes in both competitions, spearheaded by 38 goals from player-coach and Olympic gold medalist Gerry Davey. In the Scottish Cup the Lions were beaten finalists, losing 4-3 in the fourth contest of the final against Dunfermline Vikings. The next five seasons were postponed due to the Second World War, and Falkirk hosted occasional benefit matches between Canadian armed services teams and combined Scottish selections.

== Post-War Period ==
In the 1948–49 season, the Lions recruited Canadian George McNeil as head coach from Dundee Tigers. McNeil oversaw the Lions' most successful period, as well as the emergence of Johnny Carlyle, who contributed 190 points in 297 matches for the club. In McNeil's first season, Falkirk won the Scottish Cup, the Canada Cup and the post-season Anderson Trophy, retaining the latter in 1949–50. The Lions would win all three competitions again in 1951–52, with a fourth Anderson Trophy coming in the 1953–54 season, and crowds saw matches attended by 4,000 spectators.

In the 1954–55 season, the English National League and Scottish National League merged to become the British National League. The Lions lost the Autumn Cup final to Harringay Racers and the Scottish Cup final to Paisley Pirates, and finished fourth in a regular season campaign which saw the breakthrough of future British Ice Hockey Hall of Fame member Thomas 'Red' Imrie, who scored 18 goals at 17 years old.

Despite a surge in interest in British ice hockey, financial problems beset the sport and Falkirk were not unaffected. The Lions' final season was 1955–56, when they joined all of the other Scottish teams except Paisley Pirates in exiting the British league, and the club joined the Scottish Amateur League before disbanding in 1957.

== Honours ==
- Airlie Trophy winners: 1946–47
- Canada Cup winners: 1948–49, 1951–52, 1952–53
- Jubilee Cup winners: 1948–49
- Scottish Cup winners: 1948–49, 1951–52
- Scottish National League Anderson Trophy play-off champions: 1948–49, 1949–50, 1951–52, 1953–54
- Scottish National League Points Competition champions: 1938–39
