= 1957–58 British National League season =

- Sport: ice hockey

Seasons
- ← 1956–57 1958–59 →

The 1957–58 British National League season was the fourth season of the British National League (1954–1960). Five teams participated in the league, and the Brighton Tigers won the championship.

== British National League ==
=== Regular season ===
	Club	GP	W	T	L	GF–GA	Pts
1.	Brighton Tigers	32	22	1	9	198:141	45
2.	Nottingham Panthers	32	16	3	13	158:158	35
3.	Harringay Racers	32	12	5	15	157:167	29
4.	Wembley Lions	32	11	6	15	147:152	28
5.	Paisley Pirates	32	8	7	17	142:184	23

== Autumn Cup ==
=== Results ===
	Club	GP	W	L	T	GF	GA	Pts
1.	Wembley Lions	24	15	6	4	111	75	32
2.	Harringay Racers	24	13	8	3	102	89	29
3.	Nottingham Panthers	24	11	10	4	93	81	24
4.	Brighton Tigers	24	9	14	2	74	114	18
5.	Paisley Pirates	24	7	13	5	113	124	17
