= Jerry Hudson =

Canadian ice hockey player

- Born: February 12, 1929 Gananoque, Ontario, Canada
- Height: 170 cm (5 ft 7 in)
- Weight: 65 kg (143 lb; 10 st 3 lb)
- Position: Right winger
- Shoots: Right
- Played for: Dunfermline Vikings (1950-1953); Falkirk Lions (1953-1955); Nottingham Panthers (1955-1957); HC Bolzano (1957-1960); →Paisley Pirates (1958-1959); Italian national team (1958-1960); Fife Flyers (1962-1963); Falkirk Lions (1964-1965); →Den Haag Wolves (1964-1965); →Tilburg Trappers (1964-1965); Fife Flyers (1965-1967); HC Bolzano (1966-1968); →Wiener EV (1966-1967); A.S. Asiago (1968-1970)
- National team: Italy

Jerry Hudson (born February 12, 1929, in Gananoque) is a former Canadian ice hockey player. He played several seasons with clubs in the United Kingdom and Italy, and a season both in the Netherlands, and Austria during the 1950s and 60s.

== Biography ==
Born in Gananoque, Ontario, Hudson played in Scotland, first two (or three) seasons Dunfermline Vikings, where in 1950-1 and 1952-3 he was named Scottish League All-Star B Team member. The following two seasons he spent with Falkirk Lions. In 1955 he joined Nottingham Panthers, staying for two seasons.

Hudson joined Serie A club HC Bolzano in 1957. For the 1964–5 season he played for Dutch side Den Haag Wolves. For 1966-7 he played for Austrian club Wiener EV before rejoining Bolzano, where he stayed to the end of the following season. He spent 1969–70 with A.S. Asiago, also in Italy.
