= 1959–60 British National League season =

- Sport: ice hockey

Seasons
- ← 1958–59 1960–61 →

The 1959–60 British National League season was the sixth and final season of the British National League (1954–1960). Five teams participated in the league, and the Streatham Royals won the championship.

== British National League ==
=== Regular season ===
| | Club | GP | W | T | L | GF–GA | Pts |
|---|---|---|---|---|---|---|---|
| 1. | Streatham Royals | 32 | 17 | 5 | 10 | 151:123 | 39 |
| 2. | Nottingham Panthers | 32 | 16 | 2 | 14 | 127:132 | 34 |
| 3. | Brighton Tigers | 32 | 14 | 3 | 15 | 144:139 | 31 |
| 4. | Paisley Pirates | 32 | 14 | 3 | 15 | 149:151 | 31 |
| 5. | Wembley Lions | 32 | 11 | 3 | 18 | 149:175 | 25 |

== Championship Play offs ==
| Team 1 | Team 2 | Score | Round |
|---|---|---|---|
| Brighton Tigers | Nottingham Panthers | 3-2 3-3 Agg (6-5) | Final |

== Autumn Cup ==
=== Results ===
| | Club | GP | W | L | T | GF | GA | Pts |
|---|---|---|---|---|---|---|---|---|
| 1. | Streatham Royals | 24 | 18 | 5 | 1 | 130 | 68 | 37 |
| 2. | Brighton Tigers | 24 | 11 | 11 | 2 | 110 | 117 | 24 |
| 3. | Nottingham Panthers | 24 | 9 | 11 | 4 | 90 | 123 | 22 |
| 4. | Paisley Pirates | 24 | 9 | 13 | 2 | 112 | 124 | 20 |
| 5. | Wembley Lions | 24 | 8 | 15 | 1 | 108 | 118 | 17 |
