= 1955–56 British National League season =

- Sport: ice hockey

Seasons
- ← 1954–55 1956–57 →

The 1955–56 British National League season was the second season of the British National League. Five teams participated in the league, and the Nottingham Panthers won the championship.

== British National League ==
=== Regular season ===
	Club	GP	W	T	L	GF–GA	Pts
1.	Nottingham Panthers	32	17	1	14	185:166	35
2.	Wembley Lions	32	16	3	13	170:171	35
3.	Paisley Pirates	32	15	3	14	138:134	33
4.	Brighton Tigers	32	12	6	14	145:156	30
5.	Harringay Racers	32	11	5	16	171:182	27

== Autumn Cup ==
=== Results ===
	Club	GP	W	L	T	GF	GA	Pts
1.	Nottingham Panthers	24	16	6	2	124	93	34
2.	Paisley Pirates	24	12	9	3	116	94	27
3.	Wembley Lions	24	12	9	3	120	114	27
4.	Brighton Tigers	24	7	14	3	95	128	17
5.	Harringay Racers	24	7	16	1	92	118	15
