= Tommy Lauder =

Scottish ice hockey player (born 1918)

Thomas Lauder (born 7 January 1918) is a Scottish former ice hockey defender who played in the Scottish National League and the British National League for the Paisley Pirates and the Perth Panthers in the 1940s and 1950s.

Lauder was born in Johnstone, Scotland on 7 January 1918. He was inducted to the British Ice Hockey Hall of Fame in 1951. Lauder moved to Canada in 1956.

== Sources ==
- British Ice Hockey Hall of Fame entry
