= 1960–61 British Ice Hockey season =

- Sport: ice hockey

Seasons
- ← 1959–60 1961–62 →

The 1960–61 British Ice Hockey season was the first season for many years that failed to have an organised league structure after the British National League was disbanded. The costs involved for the teams had risen as a direct result of travelling long distances and the league had seen a gradual decrease in participating teams in previous years since the amalgamation of the English and Scottish teams during the 1954-55 British Ice Hockey season.

== University Match ==
- The Ice Hockey Varsity Match took place between Oxford University and Cambridge University on February 17 at the Richmond Sportsdome.

== Ahearne Cup ==
Scores

- Djurgarden 6 - Sodertalje 3
- Sodertalje 7 - Wembley 5
- Djurgarden 7 - Wembley 1

Ahearne Cup	GP	W	L	T	GF	GA	Pts
(Sweden) Djurgårdens IF	2	2	0	0	13	4	4
(Sweden) Södertälje SK	2	1	1	0	10	11	2
(United Kingdom) Wembley Lions	2	0	2	0	6	14	0
