= Thomas Lauder (disambiguation) =

Thomas Lauder was a Scottish churchman.

Thomas Lauder may also refer to:

- Thomas Dick Lauder (1784–1848), writer
- Tommy Lauder (born 1918), ice hockey player
