= 1958–59 British National League season =

- Sport: ice hockey

Seasons
- ← 1957–58 1959–60 →

The 1958–59 British National League season was the fifth season of the British National League. Four teams participated in the league, and the Paisley Pirates won the championship.

== British National League ==
=== Regular season ===
	Club	GP	W	T	L	GF–GA	Pts
1.	Paisley Pirates	30	17	2	11	163:126	36
2.	Wembley Lions	30	14	5	11	164:138	33
3.	Brighton Tigers	30	13	2	15	148:189	28
4.	Nottingham Panthers	30	9	5	16	124:146	23

== Autumn Cup ==
=== Results ===
	Club	GP	W	L	T	GF	GA	Pts
1.	Brighton Tigers	24	15	8	1	139	120	31
2.	Edinburgh Royals	24	13	8	3	136	111	29
3.	Paisley Pirates	24	12	11	1	117	121	25
4.	Wembley Lions	24	9	13	2	121	129	20
5.	Nottingham Panthers	24	6	15	3	93	125	15
