= Harvey Stapleford =

Canadian ice hockey player and coach

- Born: February 25, 1912 Watford, Ontario, Canada
- Died: c. February 1983 London, England
- Position: Left wing
- Played for: Streatham; Wembley Lions
- Playing career: 1934–1949

Harvey "Red" Stapleford (February 25, 1912 – c. February 1983) was a Canadian ice hockey player and coach. He played for Streatham between 1934 and 1938 before joining the Wembley Lions for the 1938–39 season. He returned to Streatham as player-coach in 1946. After retiring from playing, Stapleford remained as the coach for Streatham until 1954, during which time he was named All Star coach three times. He was inducted to the British Ice Hockey Hall of Fame in 1986.

He was the father of Sally-Anne Stapleford.
