= 1961–62 British Ice Hockey season =

- Sport: ice hockey

Seasons
- ← 1960–61 1962–63 →

The 1961–62 British Ice Hockey season had no organised league structure for the second consecutive year.

== University Match ==
- The Ice Hockey Varsity Match took place between Oxford University and Cambridge University on 2 March at the Richmond Ice Rink. Cambridge won 11-1.
