= Ayr Ice Rink =

Sports venue in Ayr, Scotland

- Interactive map of Ayr Ice Rink
- Location: 21 Beresford Terrace, Ayr, Scotland
- Coordinates: 55°27′24″N 4°37′41″W
- Owner: Ayr Ice Rink Ltd
- Capacity: 4,616 (3,800 seated and 816 standing)
- Field size: 200 ft × 100 ft (61 m × 30 m)

Construction
- Groundbreaking: 1938
- Opened: March 1939
- Closed: April 1972
- Architects: J & J A Carrick

Ayr Ice Rink was an ice arena in Ayr, Scotland that opened in 1939 and was used for ice skating, ice hockey and curling. The rink was notable as being the home of professional ice hockey clubs Ayr Raiders and Ayr Bruins.

The building was located at 21 Beresford Terrace on the former site of Beresford Park, home of Ayr Parkhouse Football Club. Ayr Ice Rink Ltd purchased the land from London Midland and Scottish Railway in 1938 to build the rink.

The property was demolished in 1972 to make way for a Safeway supermarket and today the site is occupied by two retail stores and carpark.

A new ice rink was built at Limekiln Road on the site of the defunct Tams Brig Stadium in 1973, but closed permanently in September 2023. It was predominantly used for curling but figure skating and recreational ice hockey.
