= Harringay Greyhounds =

British ice hockey club

Harringay Greyhounds were a British ice hockey club based in Harringay, England.

The side was founded in 1936 and initially played alongside Harringay Racers at the Harringay Arena. Both sides entered the English National League, which Greyhounds won in 1938/9 and again in 1939/40. After a break during World War II, the league resumed, but Greyhounds were unable to recapture their pre-war form. In 1949, they merged into Racers.
