= Wembley Monarchs =

United Kingdom ice hockey team

Wembley Monarchs logo

The Wembley Monarchs were an ice hockey team in the United Kingdom. They were founded in 1929 as the Grosvenor House Canadians, transferred to Wembley Canadians for the 1934–35 season and became the Monarchs in 1936. The team played in the English League 1931–35, 1936–37 and in the English National League 1935–36, 1937–50.

The Grosvenor House Canadians played their home matches at the Park Lane Rink but from 1934 the Empire Pool in Wembley Park, London, (now the SSE Arena) was the home ice for the Canadians/Monarchs (which they shared with the Wembley Lions). Foreign players faced heavy fines and deportation if found to have engaged in on-ice violence or unsportsmanlike conduct, so bar brawls and fights in the locker rooms with opposing players after games were far from uncommon.

The Grosvenor House Canadians won the English League in 1933-34 but the only success as the Monarchs came in 1948 when they won the English Autumn Cup title. After World War II ice shows became frequent events over the Christmas and New Year period and hosting two teams at Empire Pool became impractical. The Monarchs were closed down in 1950 as a result.

The heart of their strength was the famed "Kid Line", made up in 1948 of Mauno "Kid" Kauppi, Les Anning and Jean-Paul Lafortune. Left Wing Kauppi was voted MVP of the 1949 Autumn Cup game for scoring the winning goal in overtime.
