= Dunfermline Vikings =

Ice hockey team in Fife, Scotland

The Dunfermline Vikings were an ice hockey club based in Dunfermline, Scotland that played between 1946 and 1955. They played in the Scottish National League between their formation and 1954. In that year they became one of the founding members of the British National League. They finished bottom of the Autumn Cup table with two wins from 22 games, before withdrawing from the league after 11 games of the regular season in 1955.

== Honours ==
- Scottish Playoff champions : 1946–47
- Scottish Autumn Cup winners : 1946–47
- Canada Cup winners : 1946–47
- Simpson Trophy winners : 1947–48
