= English National League =

UK ice hockey league

The English National League was an early ice hockey league in England. It was founded in 1935 by most of the teams who had previously competed in the English League. It was suspended during the Second World War, but returned in 1946. In 1954 the league merged with the Scottish National League to form the British National League.

== Champions ==
1936: Wembley Lions
1937: Wembley Lions
1938: Harringay Racers
1939: Harringay Greyhounds
1940: Harringay Greyhounds
1947: Brighton Tigers
1948: Brighton Tigers
1949: Harringay Racers
1950: Streatham
1951: Nottingham Panthers
1952: Wembley Lions
1953: Streatham
1954: Nottingham Panthers

== See also ==
- British ice hockey league champions
