= Perth Panthers =

- City: Perth, Scotland
- League: Scottish National League
- Founded: 1936
- Folded: 1955
- Home arena: Central Ice Rink
- Colours: Orange, black

Championships
- Playoff championships: 1938, 1947

The Perth Panthers were a Scottish ice hockey team based in Perth. Competing in the Scottish National League, the original club operated from 1936 to 1955 and won several league championships and other tournaments. After folding in the mid-1950s, the club was revived in 1995 and played several more seasons before folding again.

== History ==
Based in Perth, Scotland, the Panthers were founded in 1936 and competed in the Scottish National League (SNL). The Panthers played their home games at the Central Ice Rink in Perth, which was also established in 1936. They were one of five teams in the league during the 1936–37 season, alongside the Glasgow Mustangs, Glasgow Mohawks, Kelvingrove and the Glasgow Lions. They also played games against teams outside the league, such as against Cambridge University. In addition to the senior Panthers team, the club ran a junior squad, known as the Perth Black Hawks.

In 1938, the Panthers became SNL champions and won the Coronation Cup championship. They failed to repeat as league champions in 1938–39, but won both their second Coronation Cup and the President's Puck tournament in the SNL. The following season, the Panthers reached the semifinals of the Scottish Cup. They played little in 1940–41 due to World War II, only playing away games. They thereafter suspended due to the war, before returning in 1946.

The Panthers peaked in popularity in the years after the war, regularly receiving attendances of 3,000. Their lineup consisted mainly of Americans and Canadians who had served in the war, along with "a sprinkling of talented locals". In their first season after returning, 1946–47, they won their second league title. They remained successful in subsequent years, led by Canadian players Bruce Hamilton, Ken Doig, Mike Mazur, and Jack Siemon, along with locals Jimmy Spence, Tommy Lauder and Ian Forbes, with the latter three all being inductees to the British Ice Hockey Hall of Fame. The Panthers won the Scottish Cup during the 1953–54 season. However, the team disbanded at the end of the 1954–55 season.

After a 10-year effort from local figures including coach Mike Fairlie and manager Richard Harding, the Panthers were announced as being revived in late 1995, playing as an independent team. Initially announced to play at Dewar's Rinks in Perth, plans fell through and they debuted in 1996 by playing "home" games in Aviemore. They remained in operation for several years and joined the Scottish National League, playing through 2002.
