= Streatham IHC =

- City: Streatham, London, UK
- League: NIHL
- Conference: Division One South
- Founded: 1932
- Home arena: Streatham Ice and Leisure Centre; Capacity: 1200; Ice size: 60m x 30m
- Colours: White, Red & Black
- Owner: Graham D'Anger (England)
- General manager: Graham D'Anger (England)
- Head coach: Ben Paynter (England)
- Captain: Ryan Watt (Scotland)
- Affiliates: Streatham Black Hawks, NIHL 2
- Website: Streatham IHC

Franchise history
- 1932–74: Streatham
- 1974–2016: Streatham Redskins
- 2016–Present: Streatham Ice Hockey Club

The Streatham Ice Hockey Club (formerly Streatham Redskins and RedHawks) is a British ice hockey club based in Streatham, London, England. Amongst the oldest British ice hockey teams still in existence, they were founded in 1932 as Streatham, and added the name Redskins in 1974. During the 1980s, the club were one of the leading teams in the British Hockey League, their biggest rivals being the Nottingham Panthers. By the end of the 1980s, however, the club's fortunes were in decline and they were relegated from the Premier Division in 1989.

The club competes in the developmental NIHL South Division 1, where they finished runners-up to the Invicta Dynamos in the 2006/07 & 2007/2008 season. In the 9/10 season the team were 7th, placed 5th in 10/11, 9th in 11/12, 7th in 12/13, 5th in 13/14, 3rd in 14/15 and 5th in 15/16.

The club was forced to move from the ice rink on Streatham High Road when it was demolished, and after a time at a temporary rink in Brixton they returned to the new Streatham Ice and Leisure Centre on the High Road, situated very close to site of the original rink.

During the 2015/16 season the club dropped the Redskins part of the name and following consultation it was decided that the club would be known as Streatham Ice Hockey Club, keeping it simple and staying true to the roots of the club. After a vote among the supporters the club adopted a new nickname of RedHawks.

In the 2021/22 season, the club achieved success winning the NIHL South Division 1 and the following NIHL South Cup.

== Club honours ==
International Cup

- 1934–35

English League championships

- 1934–35

League championships

- 1949–50, 1951–52, 1959–60

Southern League (ice hockey)

- 1973–74, 1974–75, 1975–76, 1976–77,

Inter-City League

- 1978–79, 1980–81, 1981–82

Autumn Cups

- 1951, 1953, 1954

NIHL South 1 - League Championship

- 2019–20 2021–22 2022–23 2023–24

NIHL South Cup

- 2019–20, 2021–22

NIHL South 1 Playoff Winners

- 2021–22, 2022–23

== Club roster 2022-23 ==
(*) Denotes a Non-British Trained player (Import)

Netminders
No.	Nat.	Player	Catches	Date of birth	Place of birth	Acquired	Contract
42	(England)	Danny Milton	L	28 July 1993 (age 33)	Ashford, England	2022 from Raiders 2	22/23
95	(England)	Tom Annetts	L	26 June 1987 (age 39)	Reading, England	2021 from Raiders 2	22/23
97	(England)	Nathan Gregory	R	11 July 1997 (age 29)	Woking, England	2017 from Bracknell Hornets	22/23

Defencemen
No.	Nat.	Player	Shoots	Date of birth	Place of birth	Acquired	Contract
11	(England)	Henry Aiken	L	27 September 1995 (age 30)	Winchester, England	2022 from Invicta Dynamos	22/23
13	(England)	James Warman	R	13 March 1993 (age 33)	Telford, England	2015 from Bristol Pitbulls	22/23
18	(Poland)	Tomasz Skokan*	L	22 June 1998 (age 28)	Sanok, Poland	2022 from Unia Oswiecim	22/23
23	(England)	Jack Hoppes	R	2005 (age 17)	England	2021 from Streatham U18	Two-Way
33	(England)	Milique Martelly	L	5 June 2004 (age 22)	London, England	2021 from Streatham U18	Two-Way
37	(England)	Samuel Waller 'A'	R	6 February 1992 (age 34)	Swindon, England	2021	22/23
61	(England)	Jordan Gregory 'A'	R	7 September 1995 (age 31)	Woking, England	2017 from Bracknell Hornets	22/23

Forwards
No.	Nat.	Player	Shoots	Date of birth	Place of birth	Acquired	Contract
10	(England)	Brandon Miles	R	17 August 1996 (age 30)	London, England	2019 from Invicta Dynamos	22/23
14	(England)	Ben Paynter	R	28 November 1994 (age 31)	Southampton, England	2019 from Bracknell Bees	22/23
15	(England)	Ziggy Beesley	R	15 June 1997 (age 29)	Basingstoke, England	2018 from Raiders IHC	22/23
19	(England)	Scott Bailey	R	13 January 1997 (age 29)	London, England	2018 from Invicta Dynamos	22/23
24	(England) (Russia)	Vanya Antonov	L	12 May 1997 (age 29)	Moscow, Russia	2019 from Bracknell Bees	22/23
49	(Scotland)	Ryan Watt 'C'	R	8 December 1989 (age 36)	Irvine, Scotland	2019 from Bracknell Bees	22/23
51	(England)	Jared Lane	R	31 March 1998 (age 28)	Chertsey, England	2022 from Guildford Phoenix	22/23
57	(England)	Danny Ingoldsby	R	22 May 1997 (age 29)	Frimley, England	2019 from Basingstoke Bison	22/23
63	(England)	Josh Ealey-Newman	L	20 August 1998 (age 28)	Warfield, England	2021 from Bracknell Bees	22/23
78	(England)	Ben Ealey-Newman	L	13 March 1997 (age 29)	Warfield, England	2020 from Bracknell Hornets	22/23
92	(England) (Japan)	Conner Smith	R	23 October 2001 (age 24)	London, England	2019 from Lee Valley Lions	22/23

Team Staff
No.	Nat.	Name	Acquired	Role	Place of birth	Joined From
14	(England)	Ben Paynter	2022/23	Player-Coach	Southampton, England
	(England)	Terry England	2009/10	Assistant coach	England
	(England)	Don Young	2014/15	Equipment Manager	England
	(England)	Graham D’Anger	2009/10	General Manager	England
	(England)	Dawn D’Anger	2013/14	Assistant General Manager	England
	(England)	Tanya Romans	2012/13	Physical Therapist	England

== 2021/22 Outgoing ==
Outgoing
No.	Nat.	Player	Shoots	Date of birth	Place of birth	Leaving For
8	(England)	Andrew Cook	R	26 July 1994 (age 32)	Whitley Bay, England	Retired
55	(England)	Michael Farn	L	23 June 1988 (age 38)	Durham, England	Retired

== Notable players ==
- Ken Johannson Canadian-born American ice hockey player, coach and general manager of the United States national men's ice hockey team
- Fred Perlini played for Streatham during the 1991/92 and 1992/93 seasons. Making 54 appearances, scoring 228 goals, making 144 assists, amassing 372 points.
