= British National League (1954–1960) =

Ice hockey league in the United Kingdom

The British National League was a professional ice hockey league in the United Kingdom. It was founded in 1954 by the merger of the English National League and the Scottish National League, due to a declining number of teams, as many ice rinks previously fielding several sides chose to cut back.

After the 1954–5 season, all the Scottish teams with the exception of Paisley Pirates quit professional ice hockey, and the league was never able to regain its strength. It collapsed in 1960, after which no ice hockey league operated in the UK until the formation of the Scottish League in 1962 and its successor the Northern League in 1967.

== Champions ==
- 1954–55 Harringay Racers
- 1955–56 Nottingham Panthers
- 1956–57 Wembley Lions
- 1957–58 Brighton Tigers
- 1958–59 Paisley Pirates
- 1959–60 Streatham

== See also ==
- British ice hockey league champions
