= Scottish National League (1932–1954) =

Ice hockey league

The Scottish National League was the first ice hockey league in Scotland. It was founded in 1932 by five teams from a single ice rink in Glasgow. The league gradually expanded to encompass teams from many areas of Scotland. It was suspended during the Second World War, but returned in 1946, and for the 1947/8 season was split into two divisions. These reunited the following season, and in 1954 the league merged with the English National League to form the British National League.

== Champions ==
1933: Bridge of Weir
1934: Kelvingrove
1935: Bridge of Weir
1936: Glasgow Mohawks
1937: Glasgow Mohawks
1938: Perth Panthers
1939: Dundee Tigers
1940: Dundee Tigers
1947: Perth Panthers
1948: East Division - Dundee Tigers, West Division - Paisley Pirates
1949: Fife Flyers
1950: Fife Flyers
1951: Paisley Pirates
1952: Ayr Raiders
1953: Ayr Raiders
1954: Paisley Pirates

== See also ==
- British ice hockey league champions
