= Ayr Bruins =

Defunct ice hockey team in Scotland

- City: Ayr, Scotland
- League: Scottish National League British League Northern League
- Founded: 1939
- Operated: 1939-1992
- Home arena: Ayr Ice Rink (Beresford Terrace) (1939-72) Ayr Ice Rink (Limekiln Road) (1972-92)

Franchise history
- 1939-55: Ayr Raiders
- 1963-66: Ayr Rangers
- 1966-91: Ayr Bruins
- 1991-92: Ayr Raiders

The Ayr Bruins were an ice hockey club based in Ayr, Scotland, between 1939 and 1992. Established in 1939 under the name Ayr Raiders, the club played their home games at the Ayr Ice Rink (Beresford Terrace) between 1939 and 1972 and at Ayr Ice Rink (Limekiln Road) between 1974 and 1991.

The Bruins played one season in the Northern League before withdrawing, and returned to the league in 1969. They continued to play until the closure of the Ayr Ice Rink, before returning again in 1974. The side won the Icy Smith Cup (now the British Championship) in 1976 and became a charter member of the British Hockey League's Premier Division in 1983. They made another appearance in the British Championship final in 1989 but suffered a 6–3 defeat to the Nottingham Panthers.

The Bruins changed their name back to the Ayr Raiders in 1989 and suffered relegation from the Premier Division at the end of the 91/92 season.

The club moved to Paisley in 1992 where they were known as The Bruins. After facing financial difficulties, the club dissolved in late 1992.

More recently, Ayr was represented by the Ayr Scottish Eagles between 1996 and 2002 at the Centrum Arena.

== Jerseys ==
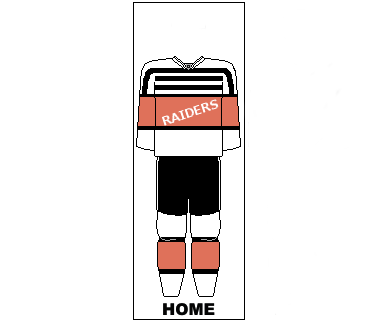
The uniform of the Ayr Raiders Ice Hockey Club (season 1954-55)
