= Dundee Tigers =

Scottish ice hockey team

- City: Dundee, Scotland
- League: Scottish National League
- Founded: 1938
- Dissolved: 2024
- Home arena: Dundee Ice Arena
- Colours
- General manager: Colin McLeod
- Head coach: Richie Phillips
- Captain: Paul Guilcher

Franchise history
- 1938–1955: Dundee Tigers
- 1987–1988: Dundee Tigers
- 1988–1996: Tayside Tigers
- 1998–2024: Dundee Tigers

Championships
- Scottish National League: 1938–39, 1939–40, 1948–49, 2001–02
- SNL Playoff Championship: 2013

The Dundee Tigers were a Scottish ice hockey team, based in the city of Dundee. The team played in the Scottish National League, and have won the competition once. Earlier, (but not related), incarnations of the Tigers have won numerous titles since the late 1930s. In 2024, the Tigers merged with the Dundee Comets to reform the Dundee Rockets.

== History ==
The first Dundee Tigers team was founded in 1938. The Tigers played in the Scottish National League from 1946 to 1954, and in the British National League in 1954–55. The team was based at Kingsway Rink, and wore a blue, red and white strip. The Tigers won the Scottish National League in 1938–39, 1939–40 and 1948–49. The original Tigers last played in 1955.

A second Dundee Tigers team was founded in 1987. They played in the British Hockey League Premier Division 1987–88, before being renamed the Tayside Tigers in 1988. They played at Kingsway Rink in white, gold and black.

The Dundee Tigers played in the Scottish Under-21 League in the late 1990s.

The present Dundee Tigers have played in the Scottish National League since 2000. They are based at the Dundee Ice Arena along with the Dundee Stars and Dundee Comets and play in white, gold and black. The Tigers won the Scottish National League 2000–01 and the SNL Playoff Championship in 2013.

== Club roster 2020–21 ==
Netminders
| No. | Nat. | Player | Catches | Date of birth | Place of birth | Acquired | Contract |

Defencemen
| No. | Nat. | Player | Shoots | Date of birth | Place of birth | Acquired | Contract |

Forwards
| No. | Nat. | Player | Shoots | Date of birth | Place of birth | Acquired | Contract |

== 2020/21 Outgoing ==
Outgoing
| No. | Nat. | Player | Shoots | Date of birth | Place of birth | Leaving For |
