= Harringay Racers =

Multiple British ice hockey teams

Harringay Racers refers to multiple British ice hockey teams based in Harringay, London, United Kingdom.

== Harringay Racers ==
The first team to use the Harringay Racers moniker was founded in 1936 and initially played alongside Harringay Greyhounds at the Harringay Arena. Both sides entered the English National League, which Racers won in 1937/8. After a break during World War II, the league resumed and Harringay were champions again in 1948/9. Following Racers' championship win, Greyhounds merged with the team.

In 1954, the English National League and the Scottish National League merged to form the British National League. Racers were the first champions, but withdrew in 1958 when the Arena was sold to a foods group for use as food storage. They did not play again.

A new team named Haringey Racers was founded in 1990, playing at Alexandra Palace. It disappeared in 1992, although Haringey Greyhounds briefly adopted the name in 2002.

== London Racers ==
Haringey Racers formed again in 2003/4 under the name of the London Racers in the newly formed Elite Ice Hockey League playing their first season at Alexandra Palace and then subsequently at Lee Valley Ice Centre. The London Racers utilised the Harringay Racers lineage within their marketing. In their debut season, the team struggled, winning only 3 games in a 56-game regular season.

The following season was more successful for the team, under the management of former London Knight Dennis Maxwell, they signed Eric Cairns and Scott Nichol during the 2004–05 NHL lockout. The team would qualify for EIHL playoffs, however, they finished bottom of their group and failed to progress.

The Racers third season seemed to continue the upward trend, as they were 6th out of 9 teams and in play off contention when a series of incidents involving the plexiglass at the Lee Valley Ice Centre forced them to deem their rink unsafe, and having failed to find a suitable replacement, they were forced to withdraw from competition and fold.

== Haringey Racers ==
The Racers name would once again be used, this time by the Haringey Racers who joined the National Ice Hockey League in the 2013–14 season, playing out of Alexandra Palace. The team was owned by Dave Richards Jnr, the son of the Assistant Coach of the EIHL's London Racers.

During their four-year tenure at Alexandra Palace, the team failed to make the playoffs, typically finishing mid-table. During the 2017 off-season it was announced, amid controversy, that the Haringey Racers would fold, and the newly formed Haringey Huskies would assume the tenancy at Alexandra Palace. Racers owner Richards claimed that the team had been 'stolen' from him, by Team Manager Lou Scott and former player Lee Mercer - now the owner of the Huskies.

The EIHA would later state that the Racers were unable to compete due to a "breakdown in the relationship between themselves and Alexandra Palace, which includes substantial monies still owed", and as such they approved the Huskies taking on the Palace tenancy.
