= Brighton Tigers =

Ice hockey team from East Sussex, England

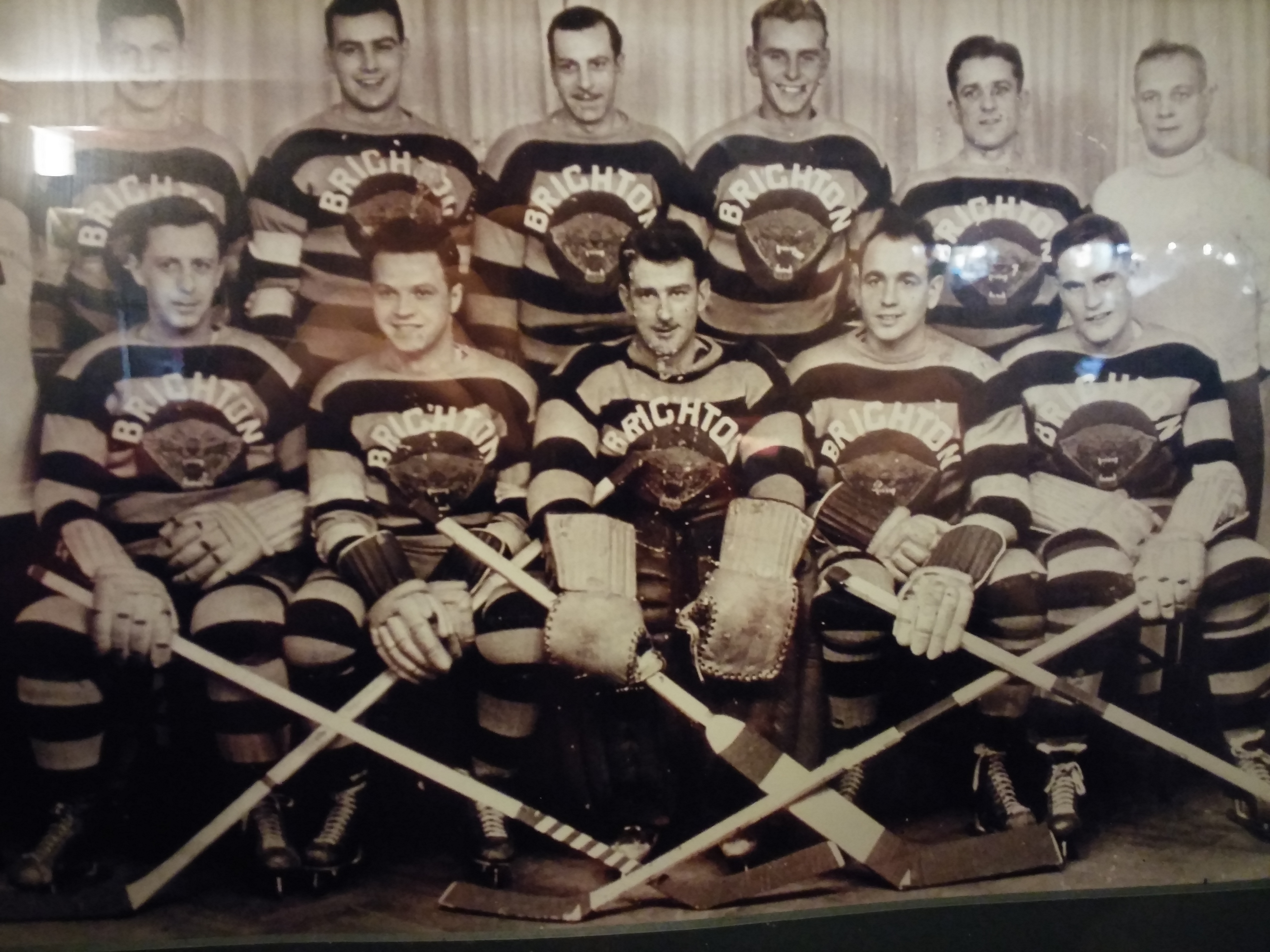
A shot of the Brighton Tigers Ice Hockey Team taken in the late 1930s.

Brighton Tigers playing in Amsterdam in 1938

The Brighton Tigers were an English ice hockey club based in Brighton. The team existed from 1935 until 1965 and were one of the United Kingdom's most successful sides during that period. The club was based at the Brighton Sports Stadium (often known by its original name of SS Brighton) on West Street.

The Tigers were members of the English National League and later the British National League. The club was one of the country's best supported teams with 4,000 spectators regularly attending matches which were held on a Thursday night.

The Tigers' most famous victory was over the Soviet Union in December 1957, winning 6–3.

The club won the first British Championship since 1930 when they defeated the Nottingham Panthers in overtime in 1960.

After the collapse of the professional league in 1960, the Tigers continued to participate in the inter-rink tournaments that were established in the league's place until 1965 when the Brighton Sports Stadium was closed down and demolished by the local council.

With the demise of the ice rink, Grice hockey, a variation of ice hockey that was played on grass, became popular for a while with pitches set up around Brighton.

The Brighton Royals team, founded in 1977, included some Tigers players. The Royals had some success in the 1980s before folding in 1988.

== Club honours ==
Competition	Year
English National League	1946-47
English National League	1947-48
English Autumn Cup	1946
English Autumn Cup	1950
British Autumn Cup	1956
British Autumn Cup	1958
British National League	1957-58
British Championship	1960
