= Wembley Lions =

English ice hockey team

The Wembley Lions were an English ice hockey team.

== History ==
The team were founded in 1934 but showed a continuity with the London Lions team which had played at various venues since 1924. The Wembley team were based at the newly built Empire Pool in Wembley Park, which they shared with the Wembley Monarchs until 1950.

The team entered the English National League, winning it in 1935-36 and 1936–37. After a break during World War II, they returned and again topped the league in 1951–52. In 1954, Lions joined the new British National League, which they won this championship in 1956/7. The League collapsed in 1960, and faced with the prospect of no regular league matches, the team folded.

Inspired by the success of Brighton Tigers, who had continued to play without a league, Lions reformed in 1963 to play friendly matches and continued until 1968.

=== 1937 international playoffs ===
The Canadian Amateur Hockey Association (CAHA) arranged an international tournament aimed to determine a world's amateur club team champion, hosted at Maple Leaf Gardens in Toronto, and invited the champions of the Allan Cup and the Memorial Cup, the Eastern Amateur Hockey League and the English National League. The world's amateur title was contested by the Wembley Lions, the Hershey Bears, the Sudbury Tigers, and the Winnipeg Monarchs. The schedule was a six-game double round-robin tournament from April 17 to 24, followed by a best-of-three game final series among the top two teams.

CAHA representative W. A. Hewitt announced the shortening of the series due to poor attendance. The game between Hershey and Winnipeg was cancelled as both teams went home early, and a final best-of-three series between Sudbury and Wembley. Sudbury and Wembley completed the best-of-three series each with a win, loss and tie. Since Wembley had travel plans to return to Europe, the series was decided by sudden death overtime period played immediately after the third game finished. Sudbury then won the series on a goal by George Hastie in the 15th minute of play.

== Notable players ==
Notable players include:

- Derek Holmes, Canadian and IIHF Hall of Fame inductee
- Ken Johannson, Canadian-born American ice hockey player, coach and general manager of the United States national men's ice hockey team
- James Robertson Justice (British actor)

== Sources ==
- A to Z Encyclopaedia of Ice Hockey
- Martin C. Harris, Homes of British Ice Hockey
