= Paisley Pirates =

- City: Renfrew, Scotland
- League: Scottish National League
- Founded: 1946
- Home arena: Braehead Arena
- Colours
- Owner: Board
- Head coach: Ian Turley
- Captain: Chris Turley
- Affiliates: Glasgow Clan

The Paisley Pirates were founded in 1946 and are one of the oldest ice hockey clubs in Scotland and the UK (the oldest being the Fife Flyers). The Pirates were the epitome of the game in Scotland during the 1950s. In season 1953–54 they won the Scottish League, the Autumn Cup, and the Canada Cup.

Their success brought them to the British National League, but local supporters could ill afford to travel to Southern England and gradually support waned. Both Pirates' junior team, Paisley Wildcats, followed by the Pirates themselves were dissolved. The Paisley Mohawks replaced them, but could not generate the enthusiasm of the Pirates. Paisley Buddies were delighted when the Pirates were relaunched in the 1990s with the opening of the new ice rink and started living up to past glories by winning Scottish Division One in their inaugural season. The following season Pirates joined British League Division One and after more league reconstruction a few seasons later joined British National League which was the start of tougher times for the Pirates, where they regularly finished out of play-off contention and close to the foot of the table. Former Aviemore Blues tough-guy/coach, Stirling Wright, was brought in from Swindon in the 1999–00 season. Local players, Bobby Chalmers, James Clarke, and O'Niell from the Pirates were selected to play for the GB junior team. Wright continued to play the home grown players more than the imports and this resulted in the imports pushing for Wright to resign. Wright met with the owner Allan Maxwell and resigned in February when he refused to reduce the playing time of the British/Scottish players. He was asked to return the next week but headed back to America. The team would not improve and the production dropped even more with many of the players leaving the club. With the costs of travel to the south of England, the Pirates could not afford to continue play in the British National League so in 2002 the club made the decision to transfer to the Scottish National League where they continue to play.

During season 2006–07, the Pirates almost had to fold due to a problem with their home ice at Paisley's Lagoon centre. However, a late move to the nearby Braehead Arena secured their survival. In an eventful season, they secured the Scottish Spring Cup, beating Dundee Tigers in the final.

After many ups and downs over the years the club was taken over by a group of supporters in 2010. The club was withdrawn from the (now defunct) SPHL during the 2009–10 season by the clubs then owner. The club joined the SNL Scottish National League.

In 2020, a partnership with the Glasgow Clan of the EIHL was announced. This would see both clubs further strengthen their links, giving Pirates commercial and marketing support whilst providing a pathway to elite ice hockey for junior players in the Greater Glasgow area.

== Club roster 2020–21 ==
Netminders
No.	Nat.	Player	Catches	Date of birth	Place of birth	Acquired	Contract

Defencemen
No.	Nat.	Player	Shoots	Date of birth	Place of birth	Acquired	Contract

Forwards
No.	Nat.	Player	Shoots	Date of birth	Place of birth	Acquired	Contract

== 2020/21 Outgoing ==
Outgoing
No.	Nat.	Player	Shoots	Date of birth	Place of birth	Leaving For
