= 1931–32 British Ice Hockey season =

- Sport: ice hockey

Seasons
- ← 1930–31 1932–33 →

The 1931–32 British Ice Hockey season consisted of English League and a Scottish League.

== English League ==
Oxford University won the inaugural English League.

	Club	GP	W	T	L	GF	GA	Pts
1.	Oxford University	12	12	0	0	53	9	24
2.	London Lions	12	9	0	3	29	16	18
3.	Princes and Queens	12	7	1	4	43	19	15
4.	Grosvenor House Canadians	12	7	1	4	37	17	15
5.	Manchester	12	3	1	8	12	43	7
6.	Sussex	12	2	1	9	8	42	5
7.	Cambridge University	12	0	0	12	6	46	0

== Scottish League ==
Nine teams participated in the league, and the Glasgow Mohawks won the championship and received the Canada Cup.

Scores

Date	Team 1	Score	Team 2
10/13	Achtungs	3 - 2	Glasgow University
10/16	Bridge of Weir	4 - 0	Bearsden
10/20	Mohawks	4 - 2	Dennistoun
10/23	Queens	4 - 2	Glasgow Skating Club
10/27	Kelvingrove	1 - 0	Achtungs
11/3	Bearsden	2 - 1	Glasgow University
11/10	Mohawks	5 - 0	Glasgow Skating Club
11/13	Queens	2 - 1	Kelvingrove
11/17	Achtungs	4 - 2	Bearsden
11/20	Bridge of Weir	3 - 1	Glasgow University
11/24	Dennistoun	3 - 0	Glasgow Skating Club
11/27	Bridge of Weir	1 - 1	Dennistoun
12/1	Mohawks	1 - 0	Queens
12/8	Bridge of Weir	2 - 0	Achtungs
12/11	Glasgow University	2 - 0	Dennistoun
12/15	Kelvingrove	3 - 0	Glasgow Skating Club
12/18	Bearsden	2 - 2	Queens
12/22	Mohawks	5 - 0	Achtungs
1/5	Bridge of Weir	6 - 2	Glasgow Skating Club
1/12	Queens	1 - 0	Dennistoun
1/15	Mohawks	3 - 1	Bearsden
1/19	Glasgow Skating Club	2 - 0	Achtungs
1/22	Kelvingrove	2 - 1	Bridge of Weir
1/26	Queens	6 - 1	Glasgow University
1/29	Dennistoun	3 - 0	Achtungs
2/2	Kelvingrove	0 - 0	Bearsden
2/23	Glasgow Skating Club	3 - 2	Bearsden
3/1	Kelvingrove	4 - 0	Mohawks
3/4	Bridge of Weir	6 - 0	Queens
3/8	Mohawks	9 - 3	Glasgow University
3/15	Kelvingrove	3 - 2	Dennistoun
3/22	Queens	3 - 1	Achtungs
3/25	Bearsden	1 - 0	Dennistoun
4/5	Glasgow Skating Club	1 - 0	Glasgow University
4/8	Mohawks	2 - 1	Bridge of Weir
4/12	Kelvingrove	2 - 0	Glasgow University

Table

	Club	GP	W	L	T	GF–GA	Pts
1.	Glasgow Mohawks	8	7	1	0	29:11	14
2.	Kelvingrove	8	6	1	1	16:5	13
3.	Bridge of Weir	8	5	2	1	24:8	11
4.	Queens	8	5	2	1	18:14	11
5.	Bearsden	8	2	4	2	10:17	6
6.	Glasgow Skating Club	8	3	5	0	10:23	6
7.	Dennistoun Eagles	8	2	5	1	11:12	5
8.	Achtungs	8	2	6	0	8:20	4
9.	Glasgow University	8	1	7	0	10:26	2

== Mitchell Trophy ==
=== Results ===
Team 1	Team 2	Score	Round
Kelvingrove	Glasgow Mohawks	1:0	1st
Glasgow Skating Club	Glasgow University	4:3	2nd
Queens	Achtungs	3:2	2nd
Bridge of Weir	Dennistoun Eagles	2:0	2nd
Kelvingrove	Bearsden	4:1	2nd
Queens	Glasgow Skating Club	5:2	Semis
Kelvingrove	Bridge of Weir	1:0	Semis
Queens	Kelvingrove	0:0	Final
Queens	Kelvingrove	2:0	Final replay

== Varsity Match ==
Oxford University defeated Cambridge University 7-0 in the Ice Hockey Varsity Match at Richmond Ice Rink.
