= 1932–33 British Ice Hockey season =

- Sport: ice hockey

Seasons
- ← 1931–32 1933–34 →

The 1932–33 British Ice Hockey season consisted of the English League and the Scottish National League.

== English League ==
The English League was won by Oxford University for the second successive year.

	Club	GP	W	L	T	GF	GA	Pts
1.	Oxford University	10	10	0	0	35	3	20
2.	Grosvenor House Canadians	10	8	0	2	42	8	16
3.	London Lions	10	4	1	5	39	22	9
4.	Princes and Queens	10	3	2	5	34	27	8
5.	Cambridge University	10	3	1	6	18	44	7
6.	Manchester	10	0	0	10	9	73	0

== Scottish National League ==
Bridge of Weir won the inaugural Scottish National League championship, receiving the Canada Cup.

Scores

Date	Team 1	Score	Team 2
10/11	Kelvingrove	3 - 1	Mohawks
10/14	Queens	3 - 0	Bridge of Weir
10/18	Juniors	2 - 1	Bears
10/21	Glasgow University	1 - 1	Dennistoun
10/25	Queens	3 - 2	Kelvingrove
11/1	Bridge of Weir	4 - 2	Mohawks
11/4	Dennistoun	1 - 0	Juniors
11/8	Bears	3 - 0	Glasgow University
11/11	Bridge of Weir	1 - 0	Kelvingrove
11/15	Juniors	3 - 2	Mohawks
11/18	Glasgow University	3 - 3	Queens
11/25	Bears	3 - 0	Dennistoun
11/29	Kelvingrove	2 - 0	Juniors
12/2	Bridge of Weir	3 - 0	Glasgow University
12/9	Dennistoun	1 - 0	Queens
12/13	Glasgow University	3 - 1	Kelvingrove
12/16	Juniors	2 - 2	Bridge of Weir
12/27	Bridge of Weir	2 - 0	Dennistoun
1/6	Mohawks	2 - 0	Dennistoun
1/10	Queens	3 - 0	Bears
1/13	Kelvingrove	2 - 0	Dennistoun
1/17	Mohawks	2 - 1	Glasgow University
1/20	Juniors	1 - 0	Queens
1/24	Bridge of Weir	1 - 0	Bears
2/14	Mohawks	4 - 1	Bears
2/21	Mohawks	1 - 0	Queens
2/28	Kelvingrove	1 - 1	Bears
3/7	Glasgow University	2 - 0	Juniors

Table

	Club	GP	W	L	T	GF–GA	Pts
1.	Bridge of Weir	7	5	1	1	13:7	11
2.	Glasgow Mohawks	7	4	3	0	14:12	8
3.	Queens	7	3	3	1	12:8	7
4.	Kelvingrove	7	3	3	1	11:9	7
5.	Juniors	7	3	3	1	8:10	7
6.	Glasgow University	7	2	3	2	10:13	6
7.	Glasgow Bears	7	2	4	1	9:11	5
8.	Dennistoun Eagles	7	2	4	1	3:10	5

== Mitchell Trophy ==
=== Results ===
Team 1	Team 2	Score	Round
Glasgow Bears	Juniors	3:2	1st
Glasgow Mohawks	Glasgow University	2:0	1st
Kelvingrove	Queens	2:0	1st
Bridge of Weir	Dennistoun Eagles	1:1, 1:0 OT	1st
Mohawks	Bears	3:3, 2:4	Semis
Kelvingrove	Bridge of Weir	0:0, 0:2	Semis
Bears	Bridge of Weir	1:0	Final

== President's Pucks ==
The 1932-33 President's Pucks was the first edition of the single-elimination tournament contested in Scotland. The title was shared by Kelvingrove and the Glasgow Mohawks.

=== Results ===
Team 1	Team 2	Score	Round
Kelvingrove	Glasgow Bears	1:0	1st
Dennistoun Eagles	Glasgow University	1:0	1st
Glasgow Mohawks	Juniors	2:0	1st
Kelvingrove	Dennistoun Eagles	2:0	Semis
Mohawks	Bridge of Weir	1:0	Semis
Kelvingrove	Mohawks	0:0	Final
Kelvingrove	Mohawks	0:0	Final replay

== Varsity Match ==
Oxford University defeated Cambridge University 1-0 in the Ice Hockey Varsity Match at Oxford.
