= Ice hockey in the United Kingdom =

- Country: United Kingdom
- Governing body: Ice Hockey UK; English Ice Hockey Association; Scottish Ice Hockey
- National teams: Men's national team; Women's national team
- First played: 1893

National competitions
- Elite Ice Hockey League National Ice Hockey League National Division, Division 1 North & South, Division 2 North & South Scottish National League Women's Elite League

International competitions
- IIHF World Championships; Winter Olympics

Ice hockey has been played in the United Kingdom since the beginning of the twentieth century, and it was a game between English Army veterans played in Canada that is the first recorded use of a sawed-off ball, which led to the use of the puck in hockey. The Great Britain men's national ice hockey team enjoyed worldwide success through the 1920s and 1930s, winning bronze at the 1924 Olympics, and gold twelve years later. They also won medals at the World Championships in 1935, 1937 and 1938, though never won the tournament. The national team has struggled since the Second World War, and has not finished better than twelfth in the World Championships since 1962. Ice hockey is played professionally in the United Kingdom in the Elite Ice Hockey League, a ten team league which was founded in 2003.

== History ==
=== General ===
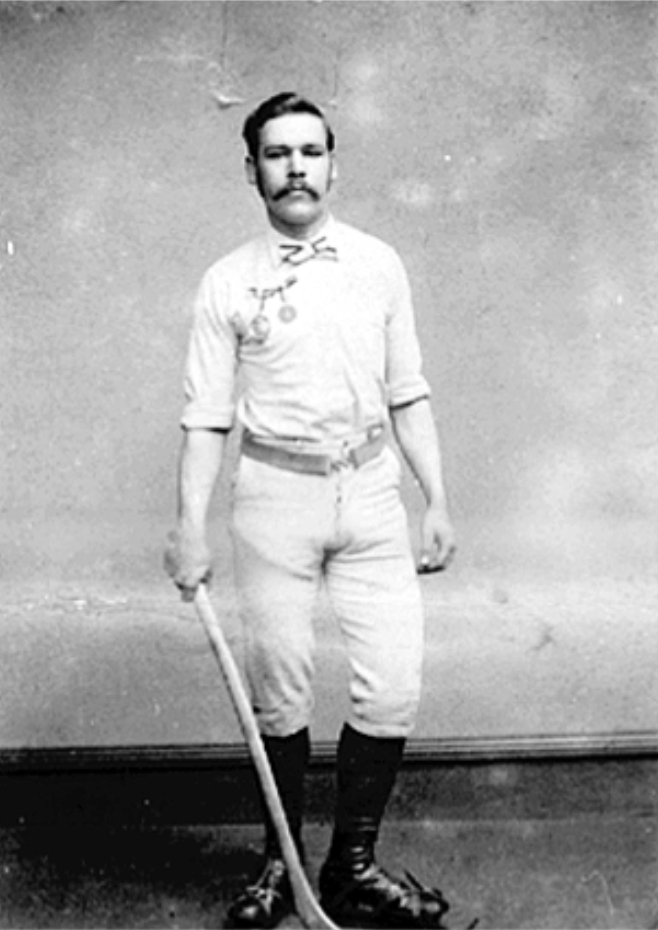
Charles Goodman Tebbutt

People in Northern climates have played sports with sticks and balls on skates for centuries, but ice hockey as we know it today was developed in Canada during the early nineteenth century, having developed from elements derived from the already existing sports of hurling, shinty, lacrosse, and sports similar to field hockey. However, in its early development period, ice hockey in British North America, present day Canada, was a conglomeration of a number of similar ice skating games which were collectively called "hockey on the ice", a phenomenon which led to the creation of what is today known as bandy, though ice hockey developed in Canada while the early development bandy began largely in England. The earliest known, extant photograph of Bandy/ice Hockey in Britain is presumably of the Oxford University Ice Hockey Club team training on Christ Church Meadow.

Bandy is considered the forerunner to ice hockey and was first identified to have been organized in Britain with English speed skater and fen skater, Charles Goodman Tebbutt who was also responsible for the creating the first published set of rules for bandy in 1882. Bury Fen, near Bluntisham, was the home of the Bury Fen Bandy Club (unbeaten for a century) where under the captaincy of Charles G. Tebbutt and his brothers (grandsons of Potto Brown's milling partner Joseph Goodman) the Bury Fen Bandy Club became responsible for formulating most of the rules of modern bandy and introducing the game into the Netherlands and other Northern European countries as well as other parts of Britain.

Today the word "bandy" is used rather than "hockey on the ice" or "ice hockey" in order to avoid confusion between the two ice skating sports. Bandy in all its forms disappeared from North America by the early 1900s after it had been absorbed into the new organized sport of ice hockey, but continued to develop in Russia and Scandinavia. Today, bandy is dominated internationally by Russia and Sweden. Meanwhile bandy is almost entirely extinct from Britain today and is played mostly as a type of cult sport in certain parts of the country, though efforts are being made to develop men's and women's national teams to compete in the international bandy competitions organized by the Federation of International Bandy. Today bandy in the United Kingdom is governed by the Great Britain Bandy Association (GBBA), formerly called the Bandy Federation of England and later the England Bandy Federation.

In early North America, indigenous persons are known to have played a type of field hockey which involved a type of "puck" or ball, and curved wooden sticks. It was first observed by Europeans being played by Mi'kmaqs in Nova Scotia during the late 17th century where it was called "ricket" by the Mi'kmaqs. It is considered possible that elements from these games were also involved in influencing the early development of ice hockey along with other existing games and sports, though in what manner and to what degree remains unclear.

The sport of ice hockey was originally played with a stick and ball, largely influenced by the British import of bandy, but in 1860 a group of English veterans from the Royal Canadian Rifle Regiment played a game in Kingston, Ontario, utilising a sliced, flattened ball, a precursor to the modern puck, for what is believed to be the first time. This use of a puck in this match, played on the frozen harbour by the city, was a significant step towards the modern game of hockey, as a flat puck acts quite differently to a round ball, changing the dynamics of the game. The game developed quickly in Canada, and in the late nineteenth century, Frederick Stanley, 16th Earl of Derby purchased a decorative punch bowl from a London silversmith to award to the leading amateur side in the country: this became known as the Stanley Cup.

=== United Kingdom ===
It was previously believed that in 1885 the first game of European ice hockey was played between Oxford University and their traditional rival Cambridge in the first Ice Hockey Varsity Match in St. Moritz, Switzerland. However, the first game is undocumented as the first photographs and team lists the date from 1895. The match was won by the Oxford Dark Blues, 6–0. Today there is no contemporary evidence that this match took place, and Oxford now claims that this was a bandy match.

In the United Kingdom, a five-team league was in operation in England in 1903; the first in Europe. The league was contested at two rinks in London: the Prince's Skating Club in Knightsbridge and Hengler's Ice Rink in the City of Westminster. It was won by the London Canadians. The first game to be played in Scotland occurred five years later in Crossmyloof, Glasgow. The same year saw the creation of the International Ice Hockey Federation, of which Great Britain was a founding member. The British Ice Hockey Association was set up in 1914, and continued until 1999, when it was replaced by Ice Hockey UK.

The sport enjoyed an increase in interest in the 1980s, primarily in North East England and Scotland, where local clubs were at the forefront of the British Hockey League. Its popularity rose further in the 1990s, when teams like the Sheffield Steelers and Manchester Storm were established, who had big, American-styled arenas and drew large crowds of up to 8,000 on average and up to 17,000 in single games, with the Manchester Storm holding the record for a British league game when they sold out Manchester Arena with 17,245 people on 23 February 1997. In the early 2000s, the Nottingham Panthers and Belfast Giants also managed to draw large crowds. In order to take British ice hockey to the next level a new, more professional, top-tier league, the Ice Hockey Superleague, was established in 1996. However, after a number of clubs withdrew from the league while others folded, the league was disbanded and replaced by the considerably more low-profile Elite Ice Hockey League in 2003, resulting in a decrease in attendance during the mid- to late 2000s.

During the 2010s, the league recovered and the popularity of ice hockey rose again, with ice hockey now being considered the United Kingdom's biggest indoor sport and fastest-growing winter sport.

==== Tiers of British ice hockey since 1995 ====
Tier	1995–96	1996–97	1997–98	1998–99	1999–2000	2000–05	2005–06	2006–17	2017–19	2019–
1	BHL Premier Division	Ice Hockey Superleague (ISL)				Elite Ice Hockey League (EIHL)				
2	BHL Division 1	British National League (BNL)					English Premier Ice Hockey League (EPIHL)		National Ice Hockey League 1 (NIHL1)	National Ice Hockey League (NIHL)
3	—N/a	English National Ice Hockey League (ENIHL)	EPIHL National Division	EPIHL Premier Division	English Premier Ice Hockey League (EPIHL)		ENIHL	National Ice Hockey League 1	National Ice Hockey League 2 (NIHL2)	National Ice Hockey League 1 (NIHL1)
3	—N/a	English National Ice Hockey League (ENIHL)	ENIHL		English Premier Ice Hockey League (EPIHL)		ENIHL	National Ice Hockey League 1	National Ice Hockey League 2 (NIHL2)	National Ice Hockey League 1 (NIHL1)
4	—N/a				ENIHL		—N/a	National Ice Hockey League 2	—N/a	National Ice Hockey League 2 (NIHL2)

== Men's leagues ==
=== Structure ===
Tier	Leagues/Divisions	
1	EIHL; 10 teams – no promotions, no relegations	
2	NIHL: National Division; 11 clubs – no promotions, no relegations	
3	NIHL: Division 1 – North (Moralee); 10 clubs – no promotions, no relegation	NIHL: Division 1 – South (Britton); 8 clubs – no promotions, no relegation
4	NIHL: Division 2 – North (Laidler); 10 clubs – no promotion	NIHL: Division 2 – South (Wilkinson); 12 clubs – no promotion

=== EIHL ===
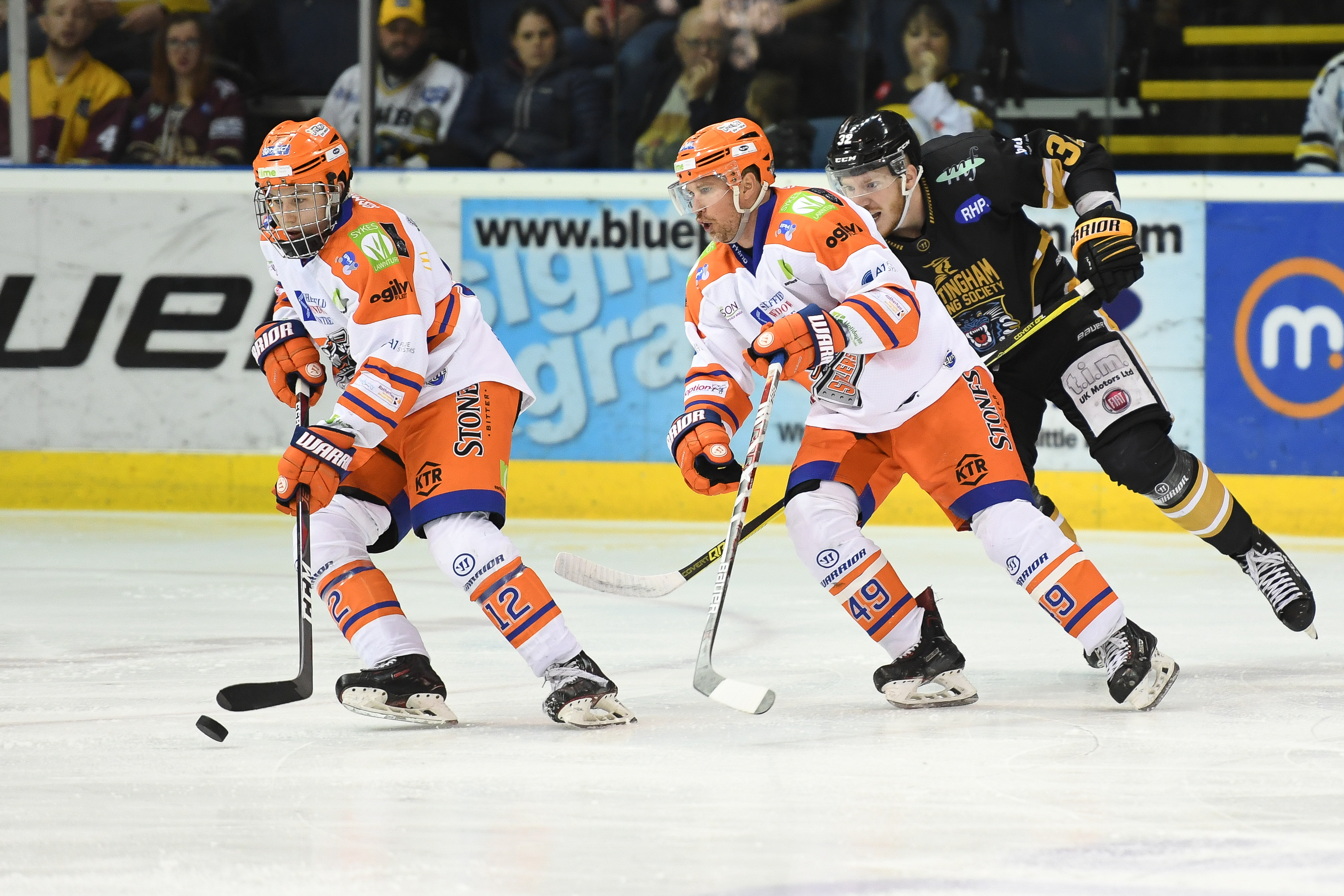
The biggest rivalry in British ice hockey is between the Nottingham Panthers and the Sheffield Steelers.

The Elite Ice Hockey League (EIHL) was formed in 2003 following the demise of the Ice Hockey Superleague and it is the highest level of ice hockey competition in the United Kingdom.

The league currently consists of ten teams, with representation from all four nations of the United Kingdom – the only league in any sport to do so. In twenty two completed seasons the league has been won by five different teams.

==== Teams ====
.	Club	Founded	City	Arena(s)	Capacity	Years in EIHL
(Northern Ireland)	Belfast Giants	2000	Belfast	SSE Arena Belfast	9,000	2003–present
(Wales)	Cardiff Devils	1986	Cardiff	Ice Arena Wales	3,088	2003–present
(England)	Coventry Blaze	1965	Coventry	SkyDome Arena	3,000	2003–present
(Scotland)	Dundee Stars	2001	Dundee	Dundee Ice Arena	2,300	2010–present
(Scotland)	Fife Flyers	1938	Kirkcaldy	Fife Ice Arena	3,525	2011–present
(Scotland)	Glasgow Clan	2010	Glasgow	Braehead Arena	4,000	2010–present
(England)	Guildford Flames	1992	Guildford	Guildford Spectrum	2,200	2017–present
(England)	Manchester Storm	2015	Altrincham	AO Arena	21,000	2015–present
(England)	Nottingham Panthers	1946	Nottingham	National Ice Centre	7,500	2003–present
(England)	Sheffield Steelers	1991	Sheffield	Utilita Arena Sheffield	9,500	2003–present

=== NIHL ===
The National Ice Hockey League (NIHL) is a set of semi-professional ice hockey leagues administered by the English Ice Hockey Association which currently form the second to fourth tiers of British ice hockey, below the Elite Ice Hockey League. Formerly called the English National Ice Hockey League (ENIHL), it was renamed in 2012 to recognise the inclusion of several teams from Scotland and Wales.

The league is split into two regions, North and South, meaning teams do not have to travel long distances for away games. Each region has 2 divisions, with rules on promotion and relegation between the divisions in each region changing regularly.

== Women's leagues ==
Tier	Leagues/Divisions	
1	Women's Elite League; 6 teams	
2	Women's Premier League; 8 teams	
3	Women Division 1; 14 teams total, divided into 2 groups geographically.	
3	South; 9 teams	North; 5 teams

== National teams ==
=== Men ===
The British national ice hockey team (also known as Team GB) was a founding member of the International Ice Hockey Federation in 1908.

The team appeared on the international scene in the early 20th century, winning the first ever IIHF European Championship in 1910, finishing as bronze medallists at the 1924 Winter Olympics, and becoming Olympic champions in 1936.

However, since then the national team has made little impact on the sport and Great Britain last qualified for the Olympics in 1948. The team's performances have increased in recent years, and in 2018, it managed to be promoted to the top division of the Ice Hockey World Championship for the first time since 1994. The Under 18 and Under 20 British teams also enjoyed success in 2018 with the former gaining promotion to group B of division I in the IIHF World U18 Championship whilst the latter finished third in their respective age category.

=== Women ===
The British women's national ice hockey team was founded in 1989 and competed in the IIHF European Championships until 1996. Since then the team has competed in the IIHF World Women's Championships finishing in 23rd place (2nd in Division IIA) in 2018. They currently sit 23rd in the world rankings just one place lower than their male counterparts. The team has never qualified for the Olympics. However, the number of British female players has nearly doubled since 2011 to 889 eligible players as of 2019.

== Participation ==
Male Players	Junior Players	Female Players	% of Population	Total Referees	Indoor Rinks	Outdoor Rinks
3,522	3,751	889	0.012	284	68	0

== Media ==
Ice hockey receives little national media coverage in the United Kingdom. Some national newspapers list results and provide short summaries of the league's news but more extensive coverage remains minimal.

On 20 July 2018 the EIHL agreed a two-year deal with FreeSports to broadcast one live EIHL game every two weeks, alongside a pre-season preview show, highlights package, and live coverage of the end of season play-off final. The coverage, which is available via Freeview (ch95), Sky (ch422), Virgin (ch553) FreeSat (ch252), TalkTalk (ch95), BT Vision (ch95) and online via the TVPlayer, will be fronted by Aaron Murphy who previously commentated on the league for Premier Sports.

Coverage in the towns and cities where ice hockey clubs are based is more extensive, and local newspapers have dedicated ice hockey reporters who cover the local team. Local radio stations such as BBC CWR, BBC Radio Nottingham and BBC Radio Sheffield all provide programming on the sport. Radio Sheffield also provides a weekly ice hockey programme Iceline while Radio Nottingham has broadcast a similar programme, Powerplay since the later stages of the 2005–06 season, and has a 15-minute weekly preview of games on a Saturday evening during the ice hockey season after the station's coverage of the local football teams is completed. BBC CWR have also followed suit with Faceoff, a programme broadcast on the first Thursday of the month during the season.

The BBC shows extensive coverage of the sport during the Winter Olympics.
