= 1935–36 British Ice Hockey season =

- Sport: ice hockey

Seasons
- ← 1934–35 1936–37 →

The 1935–36 British Ice Hockey season consisted of two separate English leagues and the Scottish National League. The English League folded and was replaced by the inaugural English National League.

== English League ==
Birmingham Maple Leafs won the final English League, defeating Streatham Royals 4–2 in the final play-off.

=== Southern Group ===
Folded in December; Streatham Royals named champion.

=== Northern Group ===
	Club	GP	W	L	T	GF	GA	Pts
1.	Birmingham Maple Leafs	10	10	0	0			
2.	Manchester	10						
3.	Cambridge University	10						
4.	Oxford University	10						

== English National League ==
Wembley Lions won the inaugural English National League championship.

	Club	GP	W	T	L	GF–GA	Pts
1.	Wembley Lions	24	15	3	6	96:54	33
2.	Richmond Hawks	24	14	5	5	83:52	33
3.	Streatham IHC	24	14	4	6	68:50	32
4.	Wembley Canadians	24	14	2	8	59:57	30
5.	Earl's Court Rangers	24	10	4	10	98:88	24
6.	Brighton Tigers	24	3	3	18	49:98	9
7.	Kensington Corinthians	24	2	3	19	64:138	7

== Scottish League ==
Glasgow Mohawks won the Scottish National League championship and the Canada Cup.

Scores

Date	Team 1	Score	Team 2
10/8	Mustangs	2 - 1	Glasgow University
10/11	Kelvingrove	3 - 0	Lions
10/15	Mohawks	5 - 1	Glasgow University
10/18	Kelvingrove	1 - 0	Mustangs
10/22	Glasgow University	5 - 0	Lions
10/25	Mohawks	2 - 1	Mustangs
10/29	Glasgow University	0 - 0	Kelvingrove
11/1	Mustangs	11 - 1	Lions
11/5	Kelvingrove	2 - 1	Mohawks
11/8	Mohawks	9 - 1	Lions
11/12	Mustangs	1 - 0	Glasgow University
11/15	Kelvingrove	4 - 0	Lions
11/22	Mohawks	4 - 0	Glasgow University
11/26	Mustangs	4 - 0	Kelvingrove
11/29	Glasgow University	1 - 0	Lions
12/10	Mustangs	0 - 0	Mohawks
12/13	Kelvingrove	2 - 1	Glasgow University
12/17	Mustangs	5 - 0	Lions
1/3	Mohawks	3 - 1	Kelvingrove
1/7	Mohawks	6 - 1	Lions
1/14	Kelvingrove	5 - 1	Lions
1/24	Glasgow University	2 - 2	Lions
1/28	Mohawks	2 - 0	Mustangs
2/4	Kelvingrove	3 - 0	Glasgow University
2/7	Mustangs	5 - 1	Lions
2/11	Mohawks	1 - 0	Kelvingrove
2/14	Mohawks	6 - 1	Lions
2/18	Mustangs	1 - 1	Glasgow University
2/28	Kelvingrove	4 - 0	Lions
3/3	Mohawks	5 - 2	Glasgow University
3/10	Kelvingrove	1 - 0	Mustangs
3/13	Glasgow University	2 - 1	Lions
3/17	Mustangs	3 - 0	Mohawks
3/20	Kelvingrove	5 - 0*	Glasgow University
3/24	Mustangs	4 - 2	Lions
3/27	Mohawks	2 - 0	Kelvingrove
3/31	Mohawks	3 - 0	Lions
4/7	Glasgow University	3 - 1	Mohawks
4/14	Mustangs	3 - 1	Glasgow University
4/21	Mustangs	4 - 1	Kelvingrove

(Note: *Match was awarded to Kelvingrove as Glasgow University scratched.)

Table

	Club	GP	W	L	T	GF–GA	Pts
1.	Glasgow Mohawks	16	12	3	1	50:16	25
2.	Glasgow Mustangs	16	10	4	2	44:14	22
3.	Kelvingrove	16	10	5	1	32:17	21
4.	Glasgow University	16	4	9	3	20:35	11
5.	Glasgow Lions	16	0	15	1	11:75	1

== Mitchell Trophy ==
=== Results ===
Team 1	Team 2	Score	Round
Glasgow Mohawks	Glasgow Lions	8:0	1st
Kelvingrove	Glasgow Mustangs	2:0	Semis
Mohawks	Glasgow University	4:2	Semis
Mohawks	Kelvingrove	1:0	Final

== President's Pucks ==
=== Results ===
Team 1	Team 2	Score	Round
Glasgow Mustangs	Glasgow University	1:0	1st
Glasgow Mohawks	Glasgow Lions	5:0	Semis
Kelvingrove	Mustangs	1:0	Semis
Mohawks	Kelvingrove	1:1	Final
Mohawks	Kelvingrove	3:0	Final replay

== Varsity Match ==
Cambridge University defeated Oxford University 2-0 in the varsity match at Earl's Court, the club's first Patton Cup victory since 1930.

== International competition ==
Great Britain competed at the 1936 Winter Olympics in Garmisch-Partenkirchen, Germany. With a largely British-born but Canadian-raised squad, The British team went unbeaten to win the gold medal. The tournament also determined the year's world and European championships, meaning Great Britain became the first team to win all three championships in the same years.
