= 1930–31 British Ice Hockey season =

- League: Scottish League and a suspended English League
- Sport: ice hockey

Seasons
- ← 1929–30 1931–32 →

The 1930–31 British Ice Hockey season consisted of a Scottish League and a English League.

The league in England was suspended due to the World Championships that took place during the season. Kelvingrove won the Scottish League and cup double.

== English League ==
A series of friendly matches were arranged featuring the following teams -

- Cambridge University
- Grosvenor House Canadians
- London Lions
- Manchester
- Oxford University
- Prince's, Hammersmith
- Queen's Ice Club, Bayswater
- Sussex
- United Services

== Scottish League ==
Nine teams participated in the league, and Kelvingrove won the championship, receiving the Canada Cup.

=== Regular season ===
Scores

Date	Team 1	Score	Team 2
10/7	Glasgow University	4 - 3	Glasgow Skating Club
10/10	Achtungs	2 - 0	Dennistoun
10/14	Bridge of Weir	3 - 0	Bearsden
10/17	Kelvingrove	1 - 0	Mohawks
10/21	Glasgow Skating Club	3 - 1	Queens
10/24	Glasgow University	5 - 1	Dennistoun
10/28	Bridge of Weir	2 - 0	Achtungs
10/31	Mohawks	3 - 0	Bearsden
11/4	Queens	0 - 0	Kelvingrove
11/7	Glasgow Skating Club	3 - 1	Dennistoun
11/11	Achtungs	4 - 2	Glasgow University
11/14	Bridge of Weir	1 - 0	Mohawks
11/18	Kelvingrove	7 - 0	Bearsden
11/21	Queens	1 - 0	Dennistoun
11/25	Bearsden	2 - 1	Glasgow Skating Club
11/28	Bridge of Weir	2 - 0	Glasgow University
12/2	Mohawks	2 - 1	Queens
12/5	Kelvingrove	4 - 0	Achtungs
12/9	Dennistoun	5 - 1	Bearsden
1/13	Queens	4 - 1	Glasgow University
1/16	Glasgow Skating Club	0 - 0	Bridge of Weir
1/20	Dennistoun	0 - 0	Kelvingrove
1/23	Glasgow University	2 - 0	Bearsden
1/27	Queens	2 - 0	Bridge of Weir
1/30	Mohawks	6 - 0	Glasgow Skating Club
2/3	Bearsden	3 - 1	Achtungs
2/13	Kelvingrove	4 - 0	Glasgow University
2/17	Bridge of Weir	4 - 3	Dennistoun
2/24	Kelvingrove	8 - 4	Glasgow Skating Club
2/27	Mohawks	1 - 1	Glasgow University
3/3	Queens	2 - 2	Bearsden
3/6	Queens	2 - 1	Achtungs
3/10	Kelvingrove	1 - 1	Bridge of Weir
3/17	Achtungs	5 - 1	Glasgow Skating Club
3/24	Mohawks	2 - 1	Dennistoun
3/31	Mohawks	1 - 0	Achtungs

Table

	Club	GP	W	L	T	GF–GA	Pts
1.	Kelvingrove	8	5	0	3	25:5	13
2.	Bridge of Weir	8	5	1	2	13:6	12
3.	Glasgow Mohawks	8	5	2	1	15:15	11
4.	Queens	8	4	2	2	13:9	10
5.	Glasgow University	8	3	4	1	15:19	7
6.	Achtungs	8	3	5	0	13:15	6
7.	Glasgow Skating Club	8	2	5	1	15:27	5
8.	Bearsden	8	2	5	1	8:24	5
9.	Dennistoun	8	1	6	1	11:18	3

== Mitchell Trophy ==
=== Results ===
Team 1	Team 2	Score	Round
Queens	Bridge of Weir	2:1	1st
Glasgow Mohawks	Dennistoun Eagles	2:2, 2:0	1st
Kelvingrove	Achtungs	4:2 OT	1st
Bearsden	Glasgow Skating Club	3:0	2nd
Queens	Glasgow University	8:1	2nd
Kelvingrove	Queens	2:1	Semis
Mohawks	Bearsden	4:0	Semis
Kelvingrove	Mohawks	2:1	Final

== Varsity Match ==
Oxford University defeated Cambridge University 5-1 in the Ice Hockey Varsity Match at St. Moritz, Switzerland.

== International Competition ==
Great Britain competed at the 1931 Ice Hockey World Championships, losing 1-0 in overtime to Austria in the first round at Krynica-Zdrój, Poland.
