= 1934–35 British Ice Hockey season =

- Sport: ice hockey

Seasons
- ← 1933–34 1935–36 →

The 1934–35 British Ice Hockey season consisted of the English League and the Scottish National League.

== English League ==
The English League was won by Streatham.

	Club	GP	W	L	T	GF	GA	Pts
1.	Streatham	14	12	1	1	82	19	25
2.	Wembley Canadians	14	11	1	2	54	27	23
3.	Wembley Lions	14	10	1	3	92	44	21
4.	Richmond Hawks	14	8	1	5	70	41	17
5.	Queens	14	6	1	7	32	68	13
6.	Oxford University	14	2	3	9	21	45	7
7.	Warwickshire	14	1	2	11	41	97	4
8.	Manchester	14	1	0	13	14	65	2

== Scottish League ==
Bridge of Weir won the Scottish National League championship, receiving the Canada Cup.

Scores

Date	Team 1	Score	Team 2
10/9	Mohawks	3 - 1	Glasgow University
10/12	Dennistoun	2 - 0	Juniors
10/16	Bridge of Weir	2 - 0	Kelvingrove
10/19	Glasgow University	3 - 1	Dennistoun
10/23	Bridge of Weir	2 - 1	Mohawks
10/26	Juniors	1 - 1*	Kelvingrove
10/30	Bridge of Weir	5 - 1	Glasgow University
11/6	Mohawks	12 - 1	Juniors
11/13	Kelvingrove	1 - 0	Dennistoun
11/20	Glasgow University	2 - 0	Juniors
11/23	Bridge of Weir	3 - 1	Dennistoun
11/27	Mohawks	1 - 1	Kelvingrove
12/4	Bridge of Weir	6 - 1	Juniors
12/11	Kelvingrove	2 - 1	Glasgow University
12/18	Dennistoun	2 - 0	Mohawks
12/25	Kelvingrove	4 - 2	Juniors
12/28	Dennistoun	5 - 1	Juniors
1/4	Kelvingrove	0 - 0	Bridge of Weir
1/8	Dennistoun	6 - 1	Glasgow University
1/11	Mohawks	2 - 1	Bridge of Weir
1/15	Kelvingrove	4 - 0	Juniors
1/18	Glasgow University	1 - 1	Bridge of Weir
1/22	Mohawks	4 - 0	Juniors
1/25	Kelvingrove	4 - 1	Dennistoun
1/29	Glasgow University	2 - 2	Juniors
2/1	Bridge of Weir	3 - 1	Dennistoun
2/5	Kelvingrove	1 - 0	Mohawks
2/8	Bridge of Weir	2 - 1	Juniors
2/12	Kelvingrove	2 - 2	Glasgow University
2/15	Mohawks	5 - 3	Dennistoun
2/19	Mohawks	3 - 1	Glasgow University
2/26	Juniors	8 - 1	Dennistoun
3/5	Bridge of Weir	3 - 1	Kelvingrove
3/8	Juniors	3 - 2	Kelvingrove
3/12	Glasgow University	2 - 1	Dennistoun
3/19	Mohawks	3 - 1	Glasgow University
3/26	Bridge of Weir	2 - 1	Glasgow University
4/2	Mohawks	7 - 3	Juniors
4/5	Kelvingrove	4 - 0	Dennistoun
4/9	Juniors	5 - 0	Glasgow University
4/12	Bridge of Weir	7 - 1	Dennistoun
4/16	Mohawks	4 - 4	Kelvingrove
4/23	Bridge of Weir	2 - 2	Juniors
4/24	Bridge of Weir	7 - 2**	Mohawks
4/30	Kelvingrove	3 - 2	Glasgow University

(Notes: *Result was voided after Kelvingrove protested. **Bridge of Weir forfeited and the match was awarded to the Mohawks.)

Table

	Club	GP	W	L	T	GF–GA	Pts
1.	Bridge of Weir	15	10	2	3	39:14	23
2.	Glasgow Mohawks	14	9	3	2	45:21	20
3.	Kelvingrove	15	8	3	4	33:21	20
4.	Glasgow University	15	3	9	3	21:39	9
5.	Dennistoun Eagles	14	4	10	0	25:42	8
6.	Juniors	15	3	10	2	29:55	8

(Note: The last game of the year, played between Dennistoun and Mohawks on 4/30, was contested as an exhibition match, with no points awarded in the standings. Mohawks won 11-5. This accounts for the two teams having played one game less.)

== Mitchell Trophy ==
=== Results ===
Team 1	Team 2	Score	Round
Glasgow Mohawks	Juniors	5:0	1st
Glasgow University	Dennistoun Eagles	3:0	1st
Glasgow Mohawks	Kelvingrove	1:0	Semis
Bridge of Weir	Glasgow University	1:1, 1:4	Semis
Glasgow Mohawks	Glasgow University	2:1	Final

== President's Pucks ==
=== Results ===
Team 1	Team 2	Score	Round
Glasgow Mohawks	Juniors	2:0	1st
Bridge of Weir	Glasgow University	2:1	1st
Mohawks	Bridge of Weir	7:1	Semis
Kelvingrove	Dennistoun Eagles	4:1	Semis
Mohawks	Kelvingrove	2:1	Final

== Varsity Match ==
Oxford University defeated Cambridge University 3-2 in the Ice Hockey Varsity Match at the Richmond Ice Rink.

== International competition ==
Great Britain competed at the 1935 Ice Hockey World Championships in January at Eisstadion Davos, Switzerland. In the first round group stage, defeat to Canada and victory over Latvia was enough to progress to the semi-final group stage. Wins over France and Austria meant further progression to the final round, despite a loss to the hosts. In the medal round, an overtime victory against Czechoslovakia secured a bronze medal in the world rankings and silver in the European standings, after further losses against Switzerland and Canada.
