= 1933–34 British Ice Hockey season =

- Sport: ice hockey

Seasons
- ← 1932–33 1934–35 →

The 1933–34 British Ice Hockey season consisted of the English League and the Scottish National League.

== English League ==
The English League was won by Grosvenor House Canadians.

	Club	GP	W	L	T	GF	GA	Pts
1.	Grosvenor House Canadians	12	11	0	1	75	22	22
2.	Queens	12	10	0	2	45	10	20
3.	Oxford University	12	7	1	4	59	22	15
4.	Streatham	12	7	1	4	50	22	15
5.	Warwickshire	12	4	0	8	26	80	8
6.	Manchester	12	2	0	10	7	80	4
7.	Cambridge University	12	0	0	12	5	31	0

== Scottish National League ==
Kelvingrove won the Scottish National League championship, receiving the Canada Cup.

Scores

Date	Team 1	Score	Team 2
10/10	Bridge of Weir	3 - 0	Bears
10/13	Kelvingrove	4 - 0	Dennistoun
10/17	Mohawks	2 - 0	Juniors
10/20	Bears	1 - 0	Glasgow University
10/24	Bridge of Weir	1 - 0	Dennistoun
10/27	Kelvingrove	3 - 0	Juniors
10/31	Mohawks	5 - 0	Bears
11/7	Dennistoun	1 - 0	Glasgow University
11/14	Kelvingrove	1 - 1	Bridge of Weir
11/21	Bears	2 - 1	Juniors
11/24	Mohawks	3 - 2	Dennistoun
11/28	Glasgow University	3 - 1	Bridge of Weir
12/5	Kelvingrove	5 - 0	Bears
12/12	Dennistoun	2 - 1	Juniors
12/15	Bridge of Weir	1 - 0	Mohawks
12/19	Kelvingrove	5 - 0	Glasgow University
12/29	Dennistoun	2 - 1	Bears
1/6	Mohawks	1 - 0	Glasgow University
1/9	Bridge of Weir	3 - 0	Juniors
1/12	Kelvingrove	2 - 1	Mohawks
1/16	Glasgow University	1 - 0	Juniors
1/19	Bridge of Weir	4 - 2	Bears
1/26	Mohawks	5 - 1	Juniors
1/30	Glasgow University	3 - 1	Bears
2/2	Bridge of Weir	2 - 0	Dennistoun
2/6	Kelvingrove	2 - 0	Juniors
2/9	Mohawks	2 - 2	Bears
2/13	Glasgow University	3 - 3	Dennistoun
2/16	Kelvingrove	1 - 0	Bridge of Weir
2/20	Bears	1 - 1	Juniors
2/27	Mohawks	5 - 1	Dennistoun
3/6	Glasgow University	5 - 1	Bridge of Weir
3/13	Kelvingrove	2 - 2	Bears
3/16	Juniors	0 - 0	Dennistoun
3/20	Mohawks	4 - 1	Bridge of Weir

Table

	Club	GP	W	L	T	GF–GA	Pts
1.	Kelvingrove	12	8	1	3	29:7	19
2.	Glasgow Mohawks	12	8	3	1	29:12	17
3.	Bridge of Weir	12	7	4	1	21:17	15
4.	Glasgow University	12	5	6	1	18:18	11
5.	Dennistoun Eagles	12	3	5	4	14:23	10
6.	Glasgow Bears	12	2	6	4	14:30	8
7.	Juniors	12	1	9	2	7:25	4

== Mitchell Trophy ==
=== Results ===
Team 1	Team 2	Score	Round
Kelvingrove	Bridge of Weir	3:0	1st
Glasgow Bears	Dennistoun Eagles	5:0	1st
Glasgow University	Juniors	2:1	1st
Kelvingrove	Bears	4:1	Semis
Glasgow University	Glasgow Mohawks	1:0	Semis
Kelvingrove	Glasgow University	8:0	Final

== President's Pucks ==
=== Results ===
Team 1	Team 2	Score	Round
Glasgow Mohawks	Dennistoun Eagles	4:0	1st
Kelvingrove	Juniors	2:0	1st
Bridge of Weir	Glasgow University	3:0	1st
Kelvingrove	Mohawks	3:0	Semis
Bridge of Weir	Glasgow Bears	6:3	Semis
Bridge of Weir	Kelvingrove	3:0	Final

== Varsity Match ==
Oxford University defeated Cambridge University 4-2 in the Ice Hockey Varsity Match at Oxford.

== International Competition ==
Great Britain competed at the 1934 Ice Hockey World Championships in February in Milan, Italy, finishing eighth in the overall rankings, and sixth in the European rankings. Victory over Czechoslovakia and a defeat to Hungary in the first round stage resulted in elimination to a consolidation round, where Great Britain recorded victories against the hosts and Romania, as well as a loss to Austria.
