= 1929–30 British Ice Hockey season =

- League: Southern and Northern British league Scottish League
- Sport: ice hockey

Seasons
- 1930–31 →

The 1929–30 British Ice Hockey season was the inaugural season where an organised league structure was implemented. The format consisted of a Southern and Northern British league and a Scottish League.

== Southern League ==
The southern league was competed for by five teams playing home and away. Oxford University and Cambridge University only played each other once in the annual varsity match at St. Moritz, Switzerland which awarded double league points.

Pos	Team	Pld	W	L	T	GF	GA	GD	Pts
1	London Lions	8	–	–	–	–	–	—	0
2	Prince's	8	–	–	–	–	–	—	0
3	United Services	8	–	–	–	–	–	—	0
4	Cambridge University	7	–	–	–	–	–	—	0
5	Oxford University	7	–	–	–	–	–	—	0

=== Southern League Championship ===
Date	Venue	Stage	Team 1	Team 2	Score
April 30	Grosvenor House	Semi-Final	Prince's	Cambridge University	3-0
May 1	Golders Green	Semi-Final	London Lions	United Services	2-1
May 3	Golders Green	Final	London Lions	Prince's	4-1

== Northern League ==
The Northern League consisted of five teams from Manchester and Glasgow.

=== Northern League Championship ===
Date	Venue	Stage	Team 1	Team 2	Score
		Final	Glasgow	Manchester	

== BIHA Grand Final (Patton Cup) ==
In the BIHA Championship, the leading teams from the southern and northern leagues would play off to determine who met in the final and compete for the Patton Cup. In the final London Lions beat Glasgow 2–1 with Blaine Sexton, who had founded the Lions in 1924, and Bushell scoring for London and MacDonald scoring for Glasgow.

The Patton Cup was named after Major Peter Patton, a founder and past president of the British Ice Hockey Association (BIHA) . Patton had founded Princes Ice Hockey Club in December 1896, the first ice hockey club in Great Britain. This was the only season that Scottish teams were linked with the Patton Cup.

Date	Venue	Team 1	Team 2	Score
May 3	Golders Green	London Lions	Glasgow Mohawks	2-1

== Scottish League ==
Ten teams first participated in the Points Competition which was played to separate the top teams from the bottom. The top five teams from the Points Competition went on to form the First Division, while the bottom five finishers were consigned to the Second Division. The Glasgow Mohawks won the championship as the top team in the First Division.

=== Points Competition ===
Scores

Date	Team 1	Score	Team 2
10/4	Bridge of Weir	2 - 1	Mohawks
10/8	Kelvingrove	6 - 0	Dennistoun
10/11	Doonside	5 - 1	Glasgow Skating Club
10/15	Queens	2 - 2	Achtungs
10/18	Bearsden	5 - 4	Mohawks
10/22	Dennistoun	3 - 3	Glasgow University
10/25	Glasgow Skating Club	2 - 0	Bridge of Weir
10/29	Queens	6 - 1	Kelvingrove
11/5	Bearsden	6 - 1	Doonside
11/8	Mohawks	4 - 1	Glasgow Skating Club
11/12	Queens	2 - 0	Dennistoun
11/15	Bridge of Weir	4 - 0	Doonside
11/19	Achtungs	8 - 0	Kelvingrove
11/22	Queens	2 - 0	Glasgow University
12/3	Achtungs	4 - 0	Dennistoun
12/6	Kelvingrove	3 - 2	Glasgow University
12/10	Bearsden	3 - 2	Bridge of Weir
12/13	Achtungs	8 - 2	Glasgow University
12/17	Bearsden	3 - 2	Glasgow Skating Club
12/20	Mohawks	7 - 0	Doonside

Table

Pos	Team	Pld	W	L	T	GF	GA	GD	Pts
1	Bearsden	4	4	0	0	17	9	+8	8
2	Achtungs	4	3	0	1	22	4	+18	7
3	Queens	4	3	0	1	12	3	+9	7
4	Glasgow Mohawks	4	2	2	0	16	8	+8	4
5	Bridge of Weir	4	2	2	0	8	6	+2	4
6	Kelvingrove	4	2	2	0	10	16	−6	4
7	Glasgow Skating Club	4	1	3	0	6	12	−6	2
8	Doonside	4	1	3	0	6	18	−12	2
9	Glasgow University	4	0	3	1	7	16	−9	1
10	Dennistoun	4	0	3	1	3	15	−12	1

=== Championship round ===
==== First Division ====
Scores

Date	Team 1	Score	Team 2
1/3	Mohawks	3 - 0	Queens
1/14	Achtungs	3 - 2	Bearsden
2/7	Achtungs	3 - 1	Bridge of Weir
2/28	Queens	6 - 2	Achtungs
3/14	Mohawks	3 - 0	Bridge of Weir
3/18	Queens	3 - 2	Bearsden
3/28	Mohawks	2 - 0	Achtungs
4/1	Queens	8 - 0	Bridge of Weir
4/8	Bearsden	3 - 1	Bridge of Weir
4/15	Mohawks	4 - 1	Bearsden

Table

Pos	Team	Pld	W	L	T	GF	GA	GD	Pts
1	Glasgow Mohawks	4	4	0	0	12	1	+11	8
2	Queens	4	3	1	0	17	7	+10	6
3	Achtungs	4	2	2	0	8	11	−3	4
4	Bearsden	4	1	3	0	8	11	−3	2
5	Bridge of Weir	4	0	4	0	2	17	−15	0

==== Second Division ====
Scores

Date	Team 1	Score	Team 2
1/7	Glasgow University	8 - 0	Doonside
1/10	Kelvingrove	3 - 2	Glasgow Skating Club
2/11	Kelvingrove	4 - 0	Dennistoun
3/4	Doonside	1 - 0	Dennistoun
3/7	Glasgow Skating Club	5 - 2	Glasgow University
3/11	Kelvingrove	1 - 0	Glasgow University
3/21	Glasgow Skating Club	8 - 0	Doonside
4/4	Kelvingrove	5 - 0	Doonside
4/11	Glasgow Skating Club	2 - 1	Dennistoun
4/18	Glasgow University	2 - 2	Dennistoun

Table

Pos	Team	Pld	W	L	T	GF	GA	GD	Pts
1	Kelvingrove	4	4	0	0	13	2	+11	8
2	Glasgow Skating Club	4	3	1	0	17	6	+11	6
3	Glasgow University	4	1	2	1	12	8	+4	3
4	Doonside	4	1	3	0	1	21	−20	2
5	Dennistoun	4	0	3	1	3	9	−6	1

== Mitchell Trophy ==
The 1929–30 Mitchell Trophy was the first edition of the single-elimination cup competition contested in Scotland. The title was won by Glasgow Skating Club.

=== Results ===
Team 1	Team 2	Score	Round
Queens	Glasgow Mohawks	1–0	1st
Glasgow Skating Club	Achtungs	2–1	1st
Bearsden	Kelvingrove	2–0	2nd
Dennistoun Eagles	Doonside	4–0	2nd
Glasgow Skating Club	Bridge of Weir	2–2, 3–1	2nd
Queens	Glasgow University	0–1	2nd
Bearsden	Glasgow University	5–1	Semis
Glasgow Skating Club	Dennistoun	4–2	Semis
Glasgow Skating Club	Bearsden	3–1	Final

== International Competition ==
Great Britain competed at the 1930 Ice Hockey World Championships, losing 4-2 to eventual winners Germany in the first round at Chamonix, France.
