= 1936–37 British Ice Hockey season =

- Sport: ice hockey

Seasons
- ← 1935–36 1937–38 →

The 1936–37 British Ice Hockey season featured the English National League and Scottish National League.

== English National Tournament ==
=== Results ===
Stage	Winning Team	1st Leg	2nd Leg	Losing Team
1st round	Wembley Lions	7:4	2:3	Richmond Hawks
1st round	Brighton Tigers	5:2	7:4	Harringay Racers
1st round	Earls Court Rangers	8:6	3:3	Southampton Vikings
1st round	Harringay Greyhounds	1:3	3:0	Wembley Monarchs
1st round	Manchester Rapids	9:6	3:4	Earls Court Royals
1st round	Streatham	Bye	Bye	N/A
2nd round	Earls Court Rangers	8:4	0:2	Wembley Lions
2nd round	Streatham	3:3	4:3	Brighton Tigers
2nd round	Harringay Greyhounds	Walk	Over	Manchester Rapids
Semi-Final	Earls Court Rangers	6:4	4:2	Streatham
Semi-Final	Harringay Greyhounds	3:4	2:2	Manchester Rapids
Final	Earls Court Rangers	3:1	2:2	Manchester Rapids

== London Cup ==
=== Results ===
	Club	GP	W	L	T	GF–GA	Pts
1.	Earls Court Rangers	10	7	2	1	40:26	15
2.	Wembley Lions	10	6	3	1	47:41	12
3.	Streatham	10	5	4	1	54:49	11
4.	Wembley Canadians	10	4	5	1	28:32	9
5.	Kensington Corinthians	10	3	7	0	48:71	6
6.	Richmond Hawks	10	1	7	2	44:42	4

== Scottish League ==
Glasgow Mohawks won the Scottish National League championship and received the Canada Cup.

Scores

Date	Team 1	Score	Team 2
10/2	Kelvingrove	5 - 0	Lions
10/6	Mohawks	2 - 2	Mustangs
10/9	Mustangs	5 - 0	Lions
10/13	Kelvingrove	1 - 1	Mohawks
10/16	Mustangs	3 - 1	Kelvingrove
10/20	Mohawks	3 - 1	Lions
10/23	Lions	2 - 1	Kelvingrove
10/27	Mohawks	4 - 2	Mustangs
10/30	Perth Panthers	2 - 2	Kelvingrove
11/3	Mustangs	6 - 1	Lions
11/6	Mohawks	3 - 0	Kelvingrove
11/10	Kelvingrove	2 - 0	Mustangs
11/11	Perth Panthers	3 - 3	Lions
11/13	Lions	2 - 1	Mohawks
11/24	Mustangs	3 - 2	Perth Panthers
12/27	Mohawks	2 - 1	Perth Panthers
12/8	Mohawks	1 - 0	Mustangs
12/9	Perth Panthers	6 - 4	Kelvingrove
12/11	Kelvingrove	4 - 2	Lions
12/15	Mustangs	4 - 3	Lions
12/23	Perth Panthers	5 - 2	Lions
1/8	Mohawks	7 - 0	Kelvingrove
1/12	Mustangs	2 - 2	Kelvingrove
1/15	Mohawks	2 - 1	Lions
1/19	Mustangs	4 - 2	Perth Panthers
1/22	Mohawks	5 - 2	Perth Panthers
1/26	Mustangs	5 - 3	Lions
1/27	Perth Panthers	4 - 2	Kelvingrove
1/29	Mustangs	4 - 1	Mohawks
2/2	Kelvingrove	6 - 3	Lions
2/9	Mohawks	4 - 1	Kelvingrove
2/12	Perth Panthers	4 - 4	Mustangs
2/16	Kelvingrove	2 - 1	Mustangs
2/23	Mohawks	6 - 1	Lions
2/26	Perth Panthers	12 - 4	Lions
3/3	Perth Panthers	3 - 3	Mohawks
3/5	Kelvingrove	3 - 3	Perth Panthers
3/9	Mohawks	3 - 1	Perth Panthers
3/10	Lions	9 - 8	Perth Panthers
3/26	Perth Panthers	W - L*	Mustangs

(*Perth was awarded a forfeit victory as the Mustangs had been suspended.)

Table

	Club	GP	W	L	T	GF–GA	Pts
1.	Glasgow Mohawks	16	11	2	3	48:22	25
2.	Glasgow Mustangs	16	8	5	3	45:30	19
3.	Perth Panthers	16	5	6	5	58:53	15
4.	Kelvingrove	16	5	7	4	36:43	14
5.	Glasgow Lions	16	3	12	1	37:78	7

== Mitchell Trophy ==
=== Results ===
Team 1	Team 2	Score	Round
Glasgow Lions	Kelvingrove	4:3 OT	Semis
Glasgow Mustangs	Glasgow Mohawks	2:1	Semis
Glasgow Lions	Glasgow Mustangs	2:3*	Final

(*The Mustangs defaulted the second leg as they were incensed about the inclusion of Ronald Milne, who had also played in the first game, on the Lions roster. They refused to play the match with him again on the team and the Scottish Ice Hockey Association awarded the Mitchell Trophy to the Lions.

== President's Pucks ==
=== Results ===
Team 1	Team 2	Score	Round
Glasgow Mohawks	Glasgow Mustangs	1:0	1st
Glasgow Mohawks	Kelvingrove	4:1	Semis
Perth Panthers	Glasgow Lions	3:2	Semis
Glasgow Mohawks	Perth Panthers	2:2	Final - 1st leg
Glasgow Mohawks	Perth Panthers	9:1	Final - 2nd leg

== Varsity Match ==
Cambridge University defeated Oxford University 5-1 in the Ice Hockey Varsity Match at Harringay Arena.

== International competition ==
Great Britain men's national ice hockey team hosted the 1937 Ice Hockey World Championships at Wembley Arena and Harringay Arena. The hosts progressed through the first two rounds unbeaten, winning six games without conceding. Great Britain book-ended the final round with victories over Switzerland and Germany, again without conceding, but a 3-0 loss to Canada meant the tournament ended with the European gold medal and the world silver medal.
