= C. Brad Faught =

Canadian historian

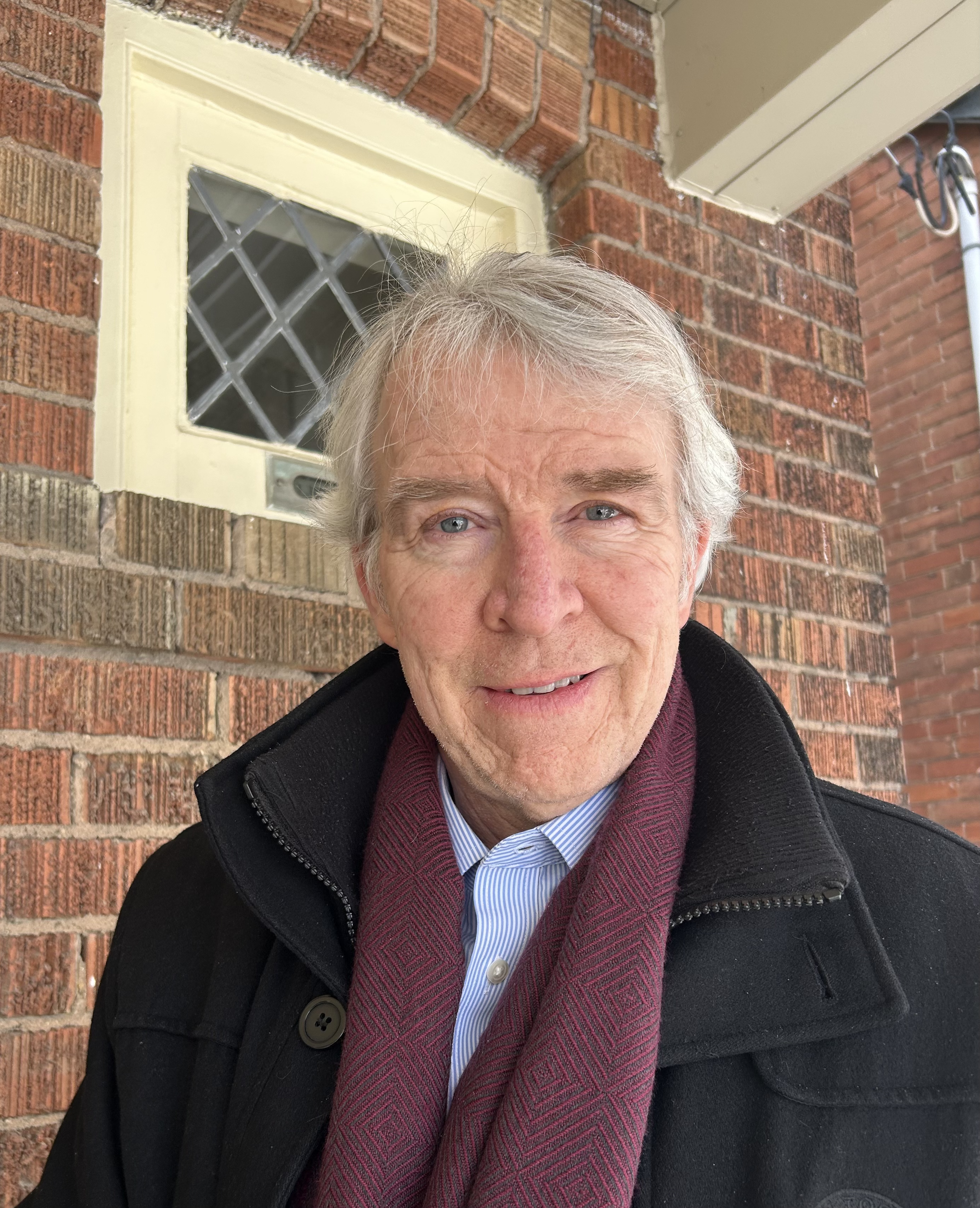
C. Brad Faught in 2025

Curtis Brad Faught (born 1963) is a Canadian historian who specializes in the history of Modern Britain, especially its politics, empire, religion, and military.

== Early life and education ==
Faught was born in Toronto, Ontario to the Rev'd Dr. J. Harry Faught, a clergyman, and Barbara Faught (née Tunnicliffe), a schoolteacher and homemaker. He grew up in Calgary and graduated from Sir Winston Churchill High School in 1981.

He received a Bachelor of Arts degree in Political Science and History from the University of Calgary in 1985. After being selected to serve as an Intern for a year at the Legislative Assembly of Alberta in Edmonton, he earned master's degrees at both the University of Oxford and Queen's University at Kingston between 1986 and 1990. In 1996, he was awarded a Doctor of Philosophy degree in History from the University of Toronto. His dissertation focused on the history of the Oxford Movement of the 1830s and 40s, which later became his first book.

During his studies at the University of Toronto, Faught worked as a teaching assistant for the historian and biographer, Michael Bliss.

== Academic and writing career ==
Faught is Professor and Chair of the Department of History and Global Studies at Tyndale University in Toronto. Prior to arriving at Tyndale in 2003, he taught mainly at Mount Allison University, as well as at the University of Toronto and University of Windsor.

Faught has published ten books, including histories of the Oxford Movement and the Cairo Conference of 1921, as well as biographies of Winston Churchill, Herbert Kitchener, and Margery Perham.

Faught is a Senior Fellow of Massey College at the University of Toronto. In 2023 and again in 2026, he was a Visiting Scholar at Pembroke College, University of Cambridge. He is a Fellow of the Royal Historical Society, as well as of the Royal Canadian Geographical Society. Until recently, he sat on the board of Wycliffe College, Toronto. He has won several awards, including the Queen Elizabeth II Diamond Jubilee Medal, the King Charles III Coronation Medal, and the Jennie Churchill Fund Award to conduct research at the Churchill Archives Centre in Cambridge.

Faught worked briefly as a journalist and freelance writer. In 2002, he was awarded Honourable Mention for a Canadian National Magazine Award from the National Media Awards Foundation for his article "Suicidal Thoughts," published by National Post Business magazine.

== Personal life ==
Faught lives in Toronto with his wife. They have two children.

As a student, Faught was a varsity athlete. He played football as a wide receiver for the University of Calgary, for which he won an athletic scholarship. Later, as a member of the Oxford University Ice Hockey Club, he was awarded a Full Blue for playing in the 1987 Varsity Match versus Cambridge University, scoring two short-handed goals twenty-two seconds apart.

== Books ==
- Faught, C. Brad (2026). Ronald Storrs: Governing British Jerusalem. New York: Bloomsbury. ISBN 978-0-7556-5340-9.
- Faught, C. Brad (2023). Churchill and Africa: Empire, Decolonisation and Race. Barnsley and Philadelphia: Pen & Sword Military. ISBN 978-1-5267-6854-4.
- Faught, C. Brad (2022). Cairo 1921: Ten Days that Made the Middle East. New Haven and London: Yale University Press. ISBN 978-0-300-25674-1. Published also in Italian (Neri Pozza, 2023), Arabic (Madarat, 2024) and Chinese (Yilin Press, 2025).
- Faught, C. Brad (2020). Allenby: Making the Modern Middle East. London: Bloomsbury/I.B. Tauris. ISBN 978-1-78831-240-0.
- Faught, C. Brad (2016). Kitchener: Hero and Anti-Hero. London and New York: I.B. Tauris. ISBN 978-1-78453-350-2.
- Faught, C. Brad (2013). Clive: Founder of British India. Washington, DC: Potomac Books/University of Nebraska Press. ISBN 978-1-61234-168-2.
- Faught, C. Brad (2012). Into Africa: The Imperial Life of Margery Perham. London and New York: I.B. Tauris. ISBN 978184885490.
- Faught, C. Brad (2011). The New A-Z of Empire: A Concise Handbook of British Imperial History. London and New York: I.B. Tauris. ISBN 978-1-84511-871-6.
- Faught, C. Brad (2008). Gordon: Victorian Hero. Washington, DC: Potomac Books/University of Nebraska Press. ISBN 978-1-59797-145-4.
- Faught, C. Brad (2003). The Oxford Movement: A Thematic History of the Tractarians and Their Times. University Park, PA: Pennsylvania State University Press. ISBN 978-0-271-02394-6.
