= Bob Walton (ice hockey) =

Canadian ice hockey player

- Born: August 5, 1912 Ottawa, Ontario, Canada
- Died: September 3, 1992 (aged 80)
- Height: 5 ft 9 in (175 cm)
- Weight: 165 lb (75 kg; 11 st 11 lb)
- Position: Centre/Right Wing
- Shot: Right
- Played for: Montreal Canadiens; Wembley Lions
- Playing career: 1931–1948

Robert Charles "Bobby, Shaky" Walton (August 5, 1912 – September 3, 1992) was a Canadian professional ice hockey forward. He played four games in the National Hockey League for the Montreal Canadiens during the 1943–44 season. The rest of his career, which lasted from 1931 to 1948, was mainly spent in the minor leagues. His son, Mike Walton, also played in the NHL.

== Career statistics ==
=== Regular season and playoffs ===
			Regular season					Playoffs
Season	Team	League	GP	G	A	Pts	PIM	GP	G	A	Pts	PIM
1929–30	Ottawa Canoe Club	OCJHL	11	7	3	10	6	—	—	—	—	—
1930–31	Ottawa Rideaus	OCJHL	16	14	5	19	20	2	0	1	1	4
1930–31	Ottawa Rideaus	—	—	—	—	—	2	0	0	0	2
1930–31	Ottawa Rideaus	M-Cup	—	—	—	—	—	3	0	0	0	2
1931–32	Ottawa New Edinburghs	OCHL	26	6	4	10	77	2	0	0	0	0
1932–33	Ottawa New Edinburghs	OCHL	14	6	5	11	12	—	—	—	—	—
1933–34	Ottawa Montagnards	OCHL	21	17	13	30	12	3	0	0	0	2
1934–35	Wembley Lions	ENG	—	—	—	—	—	—	—	—	—	—
1935–36	Wembley Lions	ENL	—	14	9	23	15	—	—	—	—	—
1936–37	Wembley Lions	ENL	—	27	17	44	22	—	—	—	—	—
1937–38	Kirkland Lake Blue Devils	GBHL	10	8	8	16	10	2	0	1	1	6
1938–39	Kirkland Lake Blue Devils	GBHL	10	7	9	16	22	3	0	1	1	0
1939–40	Kirkland Lake Blue Devils	GBHL	15	6	10	16	8	20	9	13	22	0
1940–41	Niagara Falls Brights	OHA Sr	24	15	11	26	10	3	0	1	1	0
1940–41	Sydney Millionaires	CBSHL	1	2	5	7	2	4	2	4	6	0
1940–41	Sydney Millionaires	Al-Cup	—	—	—	—	—	17	16	17	33	8
1941–42	Montreal Royals	QSHL	29	6	17	23	22	2	0	0	0	0
1942–43	Sudbury Open Pit Miners	NBHL	5	6	4	10	4	—	—	—	—	—
1943–44	Montreal Canadiens	NHL	4	0	0	0	0	—	—	—	—	—
1943–44	Buffalo Bisons	AHL	32	7	14	21	6	9	0	0	0	0
1944–45	Pittsburgh Hornets	AHL	58	37	58	95	27	—	—	—	—	—
1945–46	Pittsburgh Hornets	AHL	47	25	26	51	22	6	1	5	6	4
1946–67	Cleveland Barons	AHL	62	20	28	48	22	4	0	1	1	0
1947–48	Washington Lions	AHL	66	20	23	43	8	—	—	—	—	—
AHL totals			265	109	149	258	85	19	1	6	7	4
NHL totals			4	0	0	0	0	—	—	—	—	—
