= Prince's Skating Club =

Ice rink in Knightsbridge, London, England

Coordinates: 51.5010°N 0.1660°W

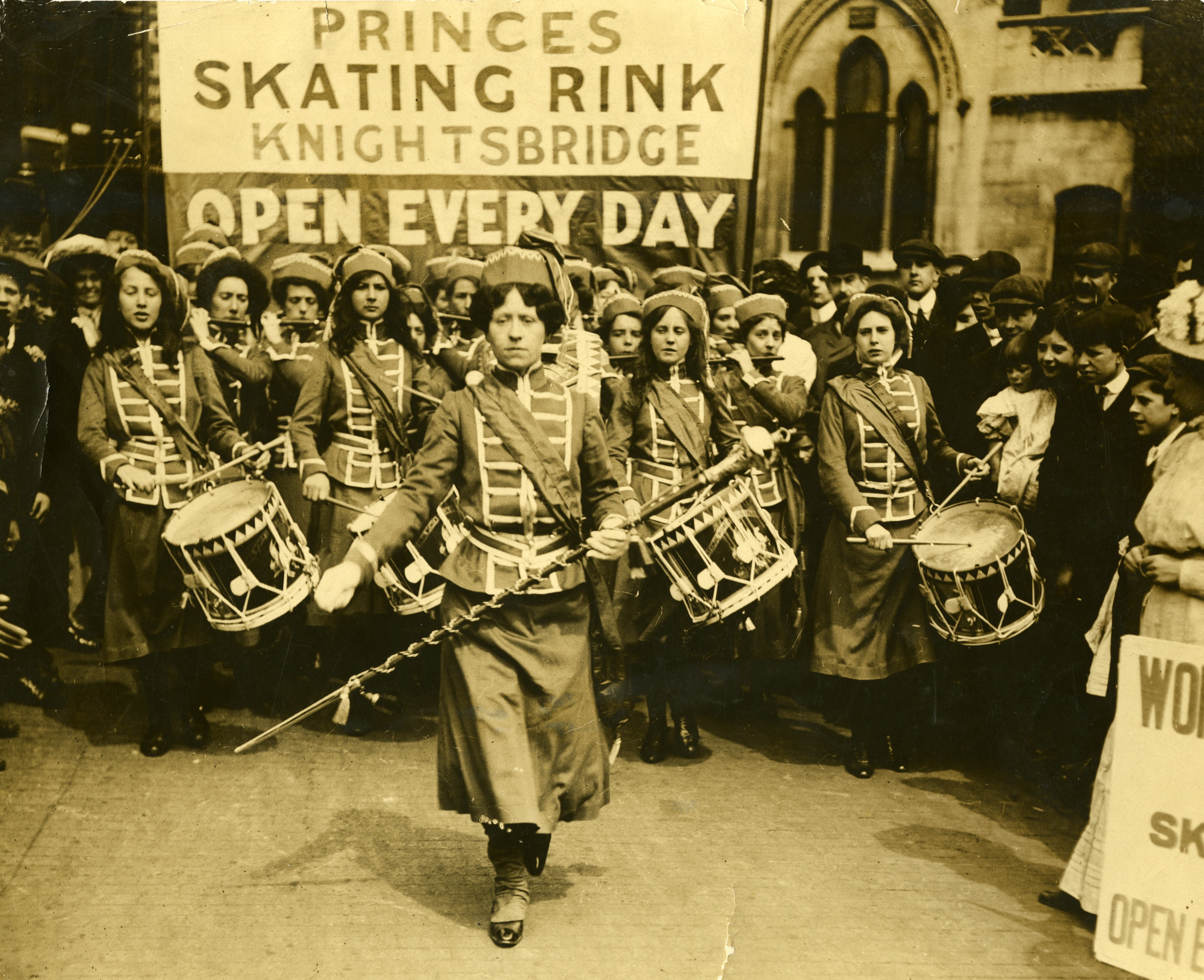
- advertising a suffragette exhibition
- Interactive map of Prince's Skating Club
- Location: Knightsbridge, London
- Owner: Prince's Club
- Surface: Ice

Construction
- Opened: 7 November 1896
- Closed: 1917

Tenants
- Princes Ice Hockey Club (1896–1914); London Canadians (1902–????)

Prince's Skating Club was an ice rink in the Knightsbridge area of London, England. It saw a number of firsts for ice hockey in Britain and Europe.

The rink was opened on Montpelier Square on 7 November 1896 by the Prince's Sporting Club. It operated on a membership-only basis and was aimed at the elite of British figure skaters who wished to practise on uncrowded ice.

Prince's was the second large rectangular rink in Britain after Stockport, its ice measuring 210 by 52 feet (64 by 16 metres). This made it an ideal venue for the developing sport of ice hockey.

The rink closed in summer 1917. The building was later used by Daimler Hire, and ultimately demolished in the mid-1970s.

== Ice hockey ==
The Princes Ice Hockey Club was founded at the rink at the end of 1896. It began playing challenge matches in early 1897, initially against the three existing teams in England: Niagara, Brighton and the Royal Engineers.

In March 1900, the rink hosted the first Ice Hockey Varsity Match, won 7–6 by Oxford, although Oxford insisted on playing with bandy sticks and a lacrosse ball. The next year, another Varsity Match was held, this time using a puck and hockey skates.

In 1902, London Canadians was founded as a second ice hockey team at the rink. They and Princes participated in Europe's first ice hockey league, which they contested against Argyll and the Amateur Skating Club, both based at Hengler's Ice Rink, and Cambridge University. The league started in November 1903 and was completed in February 1904 after eight games. Canadians won the tournament, with Princes taking second place.

The league was not repeated, as Hengler's closed. Instead, Princes began undertaking annual European tours (as did London Canadians' successors, Oxford Canadians), while teams such as Sporting Club Lyon, Brussels Club des Patineurs and C. P. P. Paris came to play the London-based teams. The 1908 match with Paris was the first under Ligue Internationale de Hockey sur Glace (international) rules in Britain; it was also notable as Thomas Sopwith played in goal.

In March 1910, the first England-Scotland ice hockey match was held at the rink, but the sport was suspended at the start of World War I. Despite this, the British Ice Hockey Association was founded at the rink in 1914.

== Figure skating ==
In October 1908, the figure skating events of the Olympics were held at the rink – the first ice sport ever included in the Olympics and the only occasion Olympic ice events have been held in Britain.

== Exhibitions ==
The rink was also used for art exhibitions. The International Society of Sculptors, Painters and Gravers held its annual exhibition there in 1898 and 1899.

The Women's Exhibition hosted by the Women's Social and Political Union and funded by Clara Mordan was held at the Prince's Ice Rink in May 1909. Its organisers included Amy Katherine Browning and Sylvia Pankhurst.
