= Charles Herbert Little =

Canadian Director of Naval Intelligence (1907–2004)

Commander Charles Herbert Little RCN, CD, FRCGS (December 11, 1907 – January 10, 2004) was Canadian Director of Naval Intelligence during the Second World War and an author.

== Biography ==
Charles Herbert (Herbie) Little was born and raised in Mount Forest, Ontario. He won scholarships to Upper Canada College (graduating in 1926) and Trinity College, Toronto (class of 1930) where he majored in German and played ice hockey, football, and cricket. He was a member of the Beta Psi fraternity.

He was offered a contract with the Montreal Maroons ice hockey team but decided to continue his studies instead.

He was selected as a Rhodes Scholar and continued Germanic studies at Brasenose College, Oxford, graduating in 1932. While there he was captain of the Oxford University Ice Hockey Club that won the Spengler Cup two consecutive seasons.

On his return to Canada, he married Ruth B. Harrison of Rothesay, New Brunswick. He taught at Upper Canada College until he joined the Royal Canadian Navy at the outbreak of the war in 1939. Little presented himself at HMCS York in Toronto, but after he mentioned that he was a teacher of German and that he had just returned from a trip to Germany, he was immediately sent to Ottawa. Upon his arrival he was asked to go through some captured German documents, some of which seemed to describe a weapon. Those papers were sent to London and were found to be partial plans for the new magnetic mines being used by the German Navy.

During the war he served as Director of Naval Intelligence on the Naval Staff. Because of his position he was one of the few Canadians to handle Ultra decrypts. After the defeat of Nazi Germany he was allowed to enter combat and was sent to join the British Pacific Fleet.

He remained in the navy until 1959, helping to develop the University Naval Training Division and the Regular Officer Training Plan.

After leaving the navy he became a federal civil servant. From 1964 to 1971 he was chief editor of the Royal Commission on Pilotage.

He wrote ten historical books, a book of poetry and numerous articles. He was a lifelong contributor to the Royal Canadian Geographical Society Journal. He was made a fellow of the society in 1969 (FRCGS). He was given an award by the Spanish government for his history of Spanish exploration of the west coast of Canada. He was National President of the Canadian Authors' Association from 1972 to 1975 and was made Honorary President in 2001. He was president of the Canadian Writers' Foundation from 1978 to 2001 and was Honorary President thereafter.

In 1977 he was awarded the Queen's Jubilee Medal. In 1991 he was awarded the Admirals' Medal. In 2000 at the age of 92, he dropped the puck at the start of the 100th annual Oxford vs Cambridge Ice Hockey game.

He died in Ottawa at the age of 96. He was buried at Frenhill Cemetery in Saint John, New Brunswick.
