= Oxford Canadians =

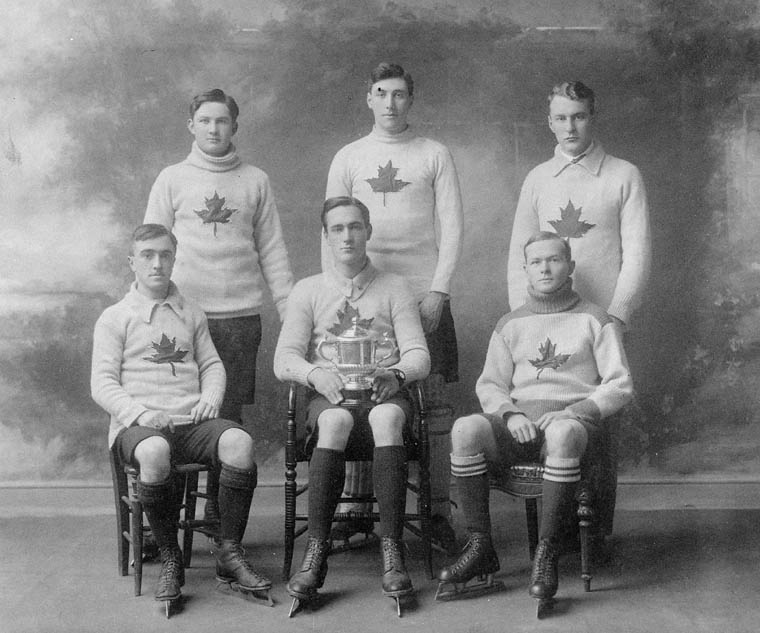
- City: Oxford, England
- Operated: 1905–1914
- Colours: White, red

The Oxford Canadians were an English amateur ice hockey team, originally formed from Rhodes Scholars who were attending Oxford University. They were the first ice hockey team representing Canada to wear a red maple leaf on their uniform. They enjoyed considerable success, winning British and European competitions.

== History ==
The team was founded in 1905, and was composed primarily of Canadian students from Oxford University attending with a Rhodes Scholarship. Initially the Rhodes Scholars played for the Oxford University Ice Hockey Club, but were banned from playing in varsity matches against Cambridge in order to prevent "a massacre". The club were the English champions in 1907 and 1910, and subsequently participated in the 1910 European Championships. They played three games, which were not considered to be part of the official competition, and beat Switzerland 8–1, Germany 4–0 and Belgium 6–0. They did not play Princes Ice Hockey Club, who were representing Great Britain in the tournament. Great Britain won the tournament, but the Oxford Canadians were accepted as European Champions owing to their success in the competition.

The Oxford Canadians began wearing a red maple leaf on their uniforms, the first hockey club representing Canada to do so. The maple leaf has been one of Canada's symbols since as early as the 18th century; in 1965, the national flag of Canada was adopted with a maple leaf on it.

The club became affiliated to the International Ice Hockey Federation in 1911. They were named English champions again in 1911, and participated in the 1912 LIHG Championship, which were unofficially considered to be "World Championships". The Oxford Canadians were the only "non-European" participants in the tournament, in which they finished second behind Berliner Schlittschuhclub, who were representing Germany in the competition. The club were the English champions for the fourth and final time in 1913. Ice hockey was suspended in the United Kingdom following the outbreak of the First World War in 1914. The Oxford Canadians club folded as a result of the war.
