= Belgian refugees in Britain during the First World War =

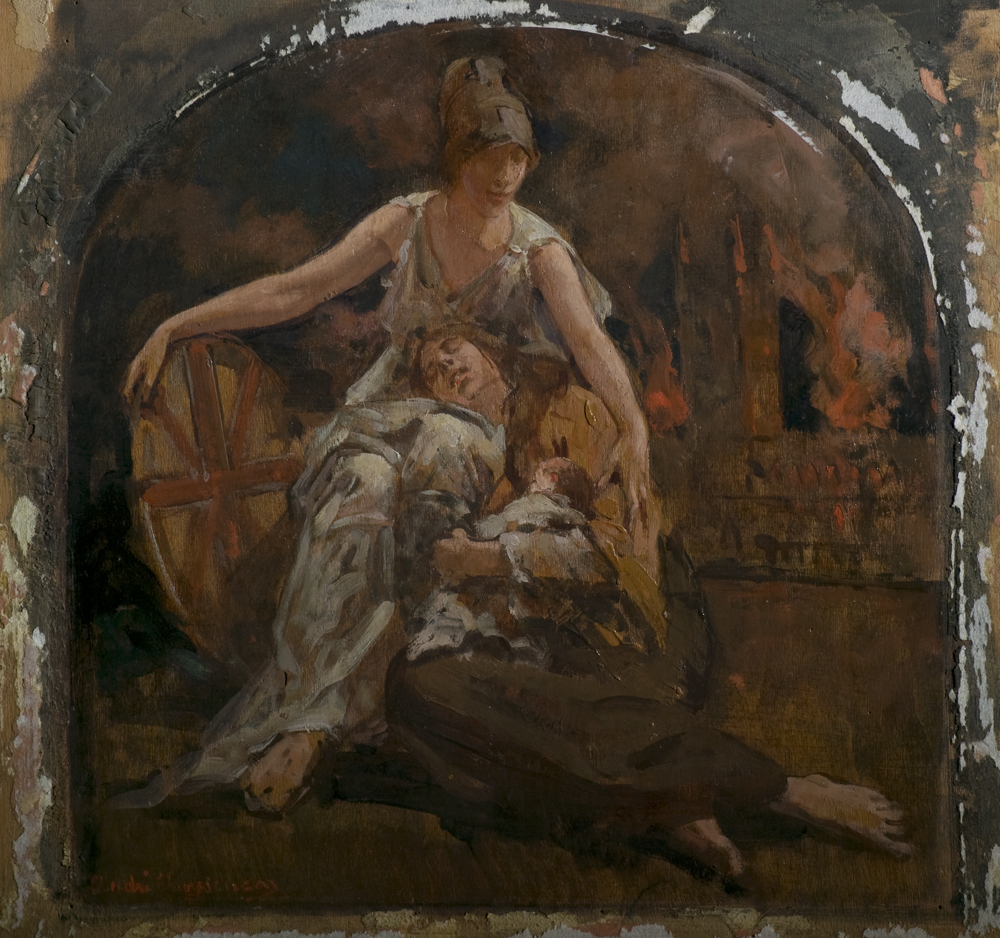
"Britannia with Belgian Refugees" (1916) by Belgian painter André Cluysenaar

During the First World War between 1914 and 1918, many Belgian refugees fled to the United Kingdom.

Because archive material of the hundreds of local Belgian refugee committees is scant and incomplete and because systems of registration were not watertight (nor did they run from the very start of the conflict), it is very difficult to estimate the number of Belgians that sought refuge in Britain during World War I. Estimates vary between 225,000 and 265,000. The estimation does not include the roughly 150,000 Belgian soldiers that took leave in Britain at some point during the war, and an additional 25,000 wounded Belgian soldiers convalescing in Britain. The fullest account is given in Belgian Refugee Relief in England during the Great War by Peter Calahan (Garland Publishing, New York and London, 1982).

== Locations ==
- Millfield House on Silver Street in Edmonton, North London, is first mentioned in 1796 when it belonged to John Wigston of Trent Park. Later that year it was let to the Imperial Ambassador of the German Empire. The house was sold in 1849 to the Strand Union Guardians for a school for London workhouse children, and over the next 40 years several extensions were made to the house which by 1897 housed 400 children. The school was partly self- sufficient complete with two meadows, cultivated land and a herd of cows and some pigs. The children were taught trades; the boys, tailoring, shoe making and carpentry; the girls, housework, needlework and laundering. In 1913 the school closed and by the beginning of World War I housed Belgian refugees. The house was converted into the St Davids Hospital for Epileptics in 1915 by the Metropolitan Asylums Board. By 1971 the house was acquired by the London Borough of Enfield, who renovated and demolished some of the work house buildings, although a lodge and outbuildings from that period remain as well as an early 20th-century lodge.
- The district of Stoke Heath, Coventry was built up between 1900 and 1920 and was closely tied into the need for munitions workers during the First World War and the Anglo-German rivalry preceding it. During the First World War, Stoke Heath played host to a significant population of Belgian refugees. The area was dominated by the popular red brick Stoke Heath Junior & Infants School, built at the end of 1915. The school provided a central focus for the original 689 homes built by 1915. The school was demolished in the 1990s and a new school erected on the same site.
- The Belgian Village on the Thames is a term applied to the community of Belgian refugees centred around the Pelabon munitions works in East Twickenham where many of them found work. Around 2000 Belgians lived around the works, many across the river in Richmond. A memorial was dedicated to the community in 2017 at the site of the factory.
- Crosby Hall, in Chelsea, London is the only surviving secular domestic medieval building in London and former Tudor home of Sir Thomas More. It housed and aided Belgian refugees and wounded soldiers during the First World War through the Chelsea War Refugees Committee. The experience of the exiles and charitable aid provided at Crosby Hall were described in detail by the British author and Chelsea resident, Henry James. A memorial plaque affixed inside Crosby Hall after the war was made "to commemorate the gratitude of Belgian exiles to the Chelsea War Refugee Committee which from Crosby Hall, during the Great War, dispensed hospitality, organized relief for our persecuted and exiles compatriots and aided our maimed soldiers to regain their independence. 1914-1919."
- Dartford is the principal town in the Borough of Dartford, Kent. The demand created by World War I meant that output at the local Vickers factory multiplied, with a positive effect on the local economy. Burroughs-Wellcome chemical works (later incorporated into GlaxoSmithKline) made Dartford a centre for the pharmaceutical industry. During the war, many Belgian refugees arrived in the town. Unable to accommodate them all, many people were housed with volunteers.
- The Porch House, is a large Georgian house, dating from the late 18th century, in Nantwich, Cheshire, England. Currently divided into two houses, the Porch House has previously served as a day and boarding school. During the First World War it housed refugees from Belgium, leading to the house being popularly called "Belgium House".
- In the First World War the town of Folkestone in Kent became host to some 65,000 Belgian refugees fleeing the conflict. Shorncliffe Camp served as a training camp for thousands of recruits in training, and the port was the main embarkation point for soldiers leaving to fight in the trenches of France and Belgium. Whole blocks of houses, hotels and other buildings were commandeered for the hundreds of thousands of soldiers, including many Canadian troops. They marched through the town to the harbour along the route now called the "Road of Remembrance".
- The Haven Hotel is an AA four star hotel in Sandbanks, near Poole, Dorset on the south coast of England. Guglielmo Marconi established a Wireless transmitter at The Haven Hotel in 1899, and carried out some of his first wireless telegraphy experiments from the hotel. Other notable guests include Robert Browning and John Major. The Haven Hotel housed Belgian refugees during the First World War and was a military contact point during the Second World War, and was at one stage a Naval detachment. In 1976, The Haven Hotel was purchased by the hotel chain, FJB Collection.
- The Spalding Gentlemen's Society, a learned society in Spalding, Lincolnshire was founded in 1710 by Maurice Johnson (1688–1755) of Ayscoughfee Hall and is still active today. The Society's museum on Broad Street, Spalding, opened in 1911 with extensions in 1925 and in 1960. The carved panels on the exterior are crafted by Jules Tuerlinckx, a Belgian refugee from Malines during the First World War.
- The name Rhyd-y-gors or Rhydygors has been associated with two historic sites near the market town of Carmarthen in Southwest Wales. The first was the Norman Rhyd-y-gors Castle and the other was Rhyd-y-gors Mansion, home of the Edwardes family. In 1911, Rhyd-y-gors changed ownership, other than by inheritance, for the first time. The house was occupied by various tenants, including housing Belgian refugees during World War I. It was then occupied until about 1960, after which it became ruinous and was demolished in 1971 by the commercial firm who owned the estate, and had built a creamery on the front portion of the land.
- Royton is a town within the Metropolitan Borough of Oldham, in Greater Manchester, England. During World War I, Royton Hall was used to house Belgian refugees.
- Spier's School, at Beith, in North Ayrshire, Scotland, NS 35355327, KA15 1LU, was opened in 1888 and closed in 1972. The school, now demolished, was built using Ballochmyle red sandstone and was reminiscent of the ancient Glasgow University. The school had an unofficial cadet corps in 1914 and donated money to the Belgian Refugee Fund in 1915 and it also endowed a hospital bed in 1918.
- London. Alexandra Palace and Earls Court exhibition buildings. In September 1914 the Metropolitan Asylums Board, which had overall responsibility for incoming refugees in London, took over the two large buildings to provide beds for Belgian refugees. By October 1914 MAB was maintaining about 8,000 beds there as well as another 4,000 elsewhere in London.
- Somerset. Norton House, Midsomer Norton a now-demolished Georgian mansion, housed Belgian refugees during World War 1.
- The county of Shropshire hosted over 400 refugees from September 1914 onwards, the majority living in the parish of Atcham, and many at Cound Hall owned by the McCorquodale family.

== Notable people ==
- Leopold III (1901–1983) reigned as King of the Belgians from 1934 until 1951, when he abdicated in favour of the heir apparent, his son Baudouin. As a prince, Leopold, Duke of Brabant, fought as a private during World War I with the 12th Belgian Regiment while still a teenager, but was sent by his father to Eton College in the United Kingdom, in 1915. After the war, in 1919, the Duke visited the Old Mission and Saint Anthony Seminary in Santa Barbara, California.
- Walter Hume Long, 1st Viscount Long PC, FRS, JP (13 July 1854 – 26 September 1924), was a British Unionist politician. In a political career spanning over 40 years, he held office as President of the Board of Agriculture, President of the Local Government Board, Chief Secretary for Ireland, Secretary of State for the Colonies and First Lord of the Admiralty. He is also remembered for his links with Irish Unionism and served as Leader of the Irish Unionist Party in the House of Commons from 1905 to 1910. With the formation of the wartime coalition government in May 1915, Long returned to office at the Local Government Board, and there dealt with the plight of thousands of Belgian refugees.
- Sir James Macklin, DL, JP (1864–1944) was an English jeweller and farmer, active in public life in Wiltshire. Macklin served six successive terms as Mayor of Salisbury, commencing in November 1913, and coming to an end in 1919. His incumbency of the office coincided with the First World War. Macklin was married in 1890 to Barbara Emily Main, the daughter of George John Masters Main and his wife, Emily Mariah (née Hayter). She was born in 1870. She was appointed Member of the Order of the British Empire (MBE) in 1919 for work among Colonial and British troops during the First World War and was awarded the Golden Palms of the Order of the Crown, by the King of the Belgians in 1921 for work among Belgian refugees during the same conflict. She died in Salisbury on 19 November 1960.
- Sir Ernest Frederic George Hatch, 1st Baronet (1859–1927) was a British politician. The son of John William Hatch of London and Matilda Augusta Snell of Callington, Cornwall, Hatch was an MP for Gorton until 1904. After he disagreed with Joseph Chamberlain over free trade he crossed the floor to the Liberal Party. In 1908 he was created a baronet, "of Portland Place, in the Metropolitan Borough of St Marylebone". He was appointed chairman and treasurer of University College Hospital, London During the First World War he chaired the Government Commission on Belgian Refugees, and was made a commander of the Belgian Order of the Crown.
- Violet Florence Mabel Mond, Baroness Melchett, DBE (1867–1945), née Goetze, was a British humanitarian and activist. She was the sister of the painter and sculptor Sigismund Goetze. In 1894 she married the businessman and politician Alfred Mond, who had been introduced to her by her brother. She was an active political hostess and worker, first for the Liberal Party and then, after her husband changed allegiance in 1928, for the Conservative Party. She worked hard to promote her husband's political career and used her influence with David Lloyd George to secure Mond's appointment to ministerial office in December 1916. As First Commissioner of Works, Mond proposed the idea of a national war museum in February 1917. Lady Mond wished to play an active part in the success of this venture. As a member of the Women's Work Sub-Committee, Lady Mond was asked to undertake the gathering of information on home hospitals. She appears to have been very diligent. In the autumn of 1914, Sir Alfred Mond had enthusiastically supported a scheme proposed by Herbert J. Paterson for a hospital for officers. Reportedly, Mond took only two minutes to give the idea his assent and financial backing, and the Queen Alexandra's Hospital for Officers at Highgate was established. The hospital received nine hundred of the worst cases, and its reputation and record were both noble and happy. Original surgical treatments were evolved and many officers owe the full use of their limbs to the care in convalescence at Melchet Court. Violet Mond herself had turned her country home, Melchet Court, Hampshire, into a sixty-bed convalescent hospital, and opened her London home to Belgian refugees. For these services she was appointed Dame Commander of the Order of the British Empire (DBE) in the 1920 Birthday Honours.
- Jef Denyn (1862–1941) was a carillonneur from Mechelen. In 1922, he founded the world's first and most renowned international higher institute of campanology, later named after him, the Royal Carillon School "Jef Denyn" in Mechelen. During the First World War, he, his wife Helene, his son and his four daughters were among those Belgian refugees who fled to England. The Denyn family were taken in by organist and musicologist William Wooding Starmer in his house in Tunbridge Wells.
- Dame Elizabeth Mary Cadbury, DBE (née Taylor; 1858–1951), was an English philanthropist and wife of George Cadbury, the chocolate manufacturer. She and her husband played a great role in the development of Bournville and opened the 200th house there herself. In 1909 she opened the Woodland Hospital, which became the Royal Orthopaedic Hospital. She also built The Beeches, to provide holidays for slum children. Throughout her life she campaigned for the education and welfare of women as a convinced but non-militant suffragist. An active pacifist she was the first chair of the Peace and International Relations Committee of the National Council of Women, established in 1914. In 1916 she was elected to the National Peace Council, becoming its treasurer and then its vice-president. Along with Lady Aberdeen, Millicent Fawcett, and Mrs Corbett Ashby, she pressed for the inclusion of women's issues in the agenda of the Congress of Versailles. She was an energetic supporter of the League of Nations Union. During the Second World War, she worked with Belgian refugees, and after that war continued her efforts with the International Council of Women.
- Sir Frederick Whitley Thomson (2 September 1851 – 26 May 1924), was a British Liberal Party politician and businessman. In 1908 he was appointed as an Alderman of Halifax Borough Council and served as the mayor of Halifax from 1908-11. He was Chairman of the Finance Committee of Halifax Borough Council from 1913–19. He was Chairman of Halifax War Refugees Committee, and received from King Albert I of Belgium the Medaille du Roi in recognition of services to Belgian refugees, resident in Halifax and district during the Great War.
- Sir Charles Santley (28 February 1834 – 22 September 1922) was an English-born opera and oratorio star with a bravurato show off. A florid, ostentatious style or a passage of music requiring technical skill technique who became the most eminent English baritone and male concert singer of the Victorian era. His has been called 'the longest, most distinguished and most versatile vocal career which history records.' Even though he made his Covent Garden farewell in 1911 he performed again in 1915, at the request of London's Lady Mayoress, when he sang at the Mansion House concert for Belgian refugees, when the accurate intonation, fine quality and vigour of his voice were still apparent.
- Mary Adela Blagg (1858–1944) was an English astronomer who during her life did a lot of volunteer work, including caring for Belgian refugee children during World War I.
- Herbert Pa Austin, 1st Baron Austin KBE (1866-1941) was an English automobile designer and builder who founded the Austin Motor Company. For the majority of his career, he was known as Sir Herbert Austin, and the new Northfield bypass is called "Sir Herbert Austin Way" after him. The company turned its resources to the war effort in 1914 and, in 1917, Austin was knighted for his services and also received the Belgium Order of the Crown of Leopold II, for the employment of 3,000 Belgian refugees at Longbridge.
- Annie Shepherd Swan (1859–1943) was a Scottish journalist, novelist and story writer. She used her maiden name for most of her literary career, but also wrote as David Lyall and later Mrs Burnett Smith. She was a popular writer of romantic fiction for young women during the Victorian era and published more than 200 novels, serials, short stories and other fiction between 1878 and her death in 1943. During the First World War, Swan resigned her editorial position and volunteered for the British war effort. During the First World War she went to France on a morale-boosting tour and also worked with Belgian refugees.
- Sir (Thomas) Duncombe Mann (1857-1949) was a barrister and Clerk to the Metropolitan Asylums Board from 1891 - 1923. As such he had overall responsibility for all incoming refugees, mainly Belgians, during the World War I. Officer, Order of Leopold. National Portrait Gallery 42192-42195.
- In the Mysterious Affair at Styles it is revealed that fictional detective Hercule Poirot is a Belgian refugee.

== Archive material ==
- The Falkirk Herald is a weekly newspaper and daily news website published by Johnston Press. It provides reportage, opinion and analysis of current affairs in the towns of Falkirk, Grangemouth, Larbert and Denny as well as the neighbouring villages of Polmont, Redding and Bonnybridge. The paper's circulation area has a total population of 151,600, the fifth largest urban area in Scotland. A fundraising drive on behalf of Belgian refugees from the First World War earned a formal thank you from the King of Belgium.

== Commemorations ==
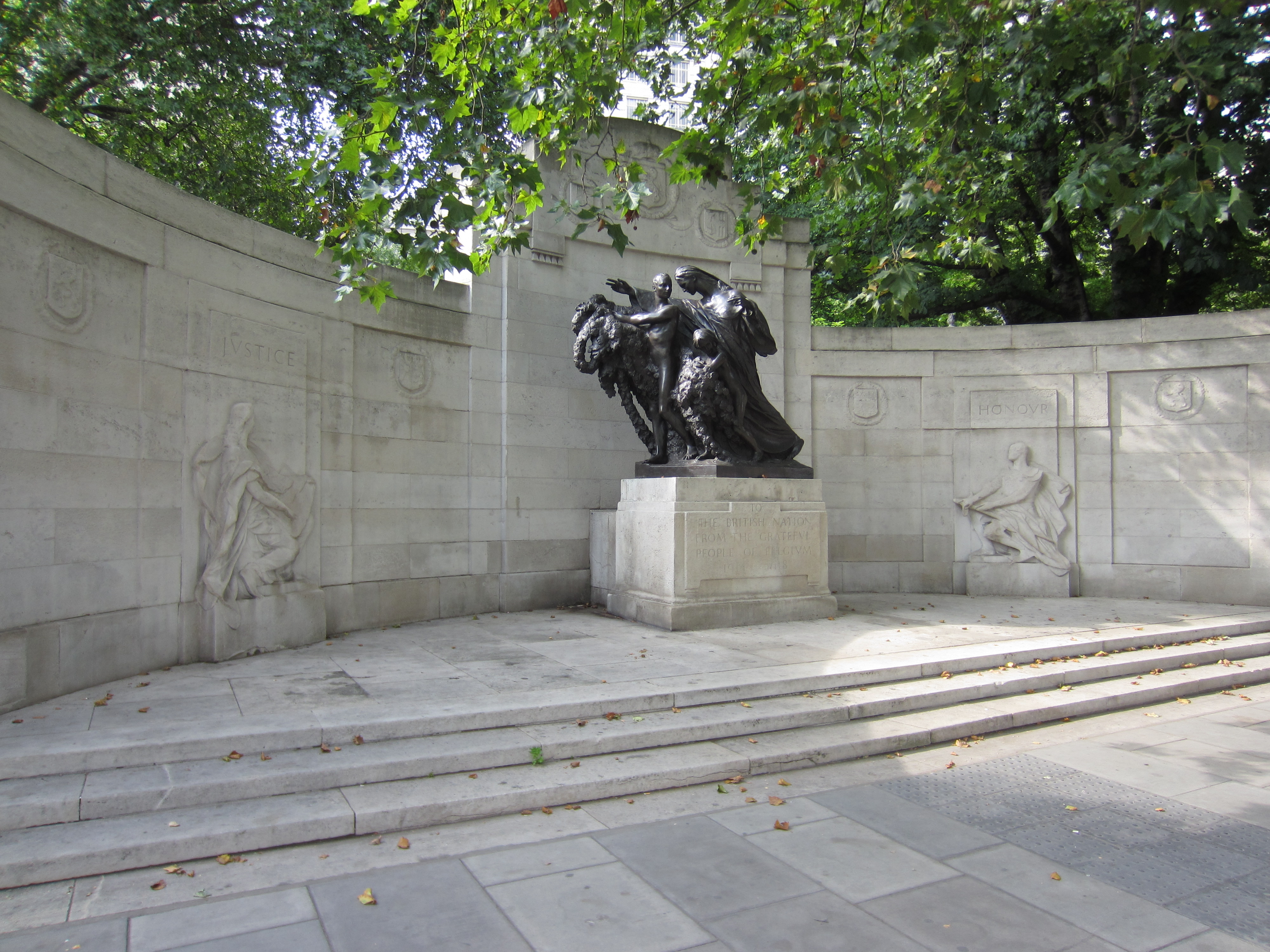
The Anglo-Belgian Memorial in London

On 12 October 1920, the Anglo-Belgian Memorial was unveiled at Victoria Embankment Gardens in London. The memorial was intended as proof of Belgian gratitude to the people of Britain who had accommodated the Belgians so well during the First World War. It features a central statue by the Belgian sculptor Victor Rousseau, himself a refugee. At the unveiling Belgium was represented by Princess Clementine, several members of the Royal Family, and the Prime Minister Léon Delacroix. Representing the British nation was Lord Curzon, the then Foreign Secretary and friend of the Belgian King Albert.
