= Princes Ice Hockey Club =

European ice hockey team

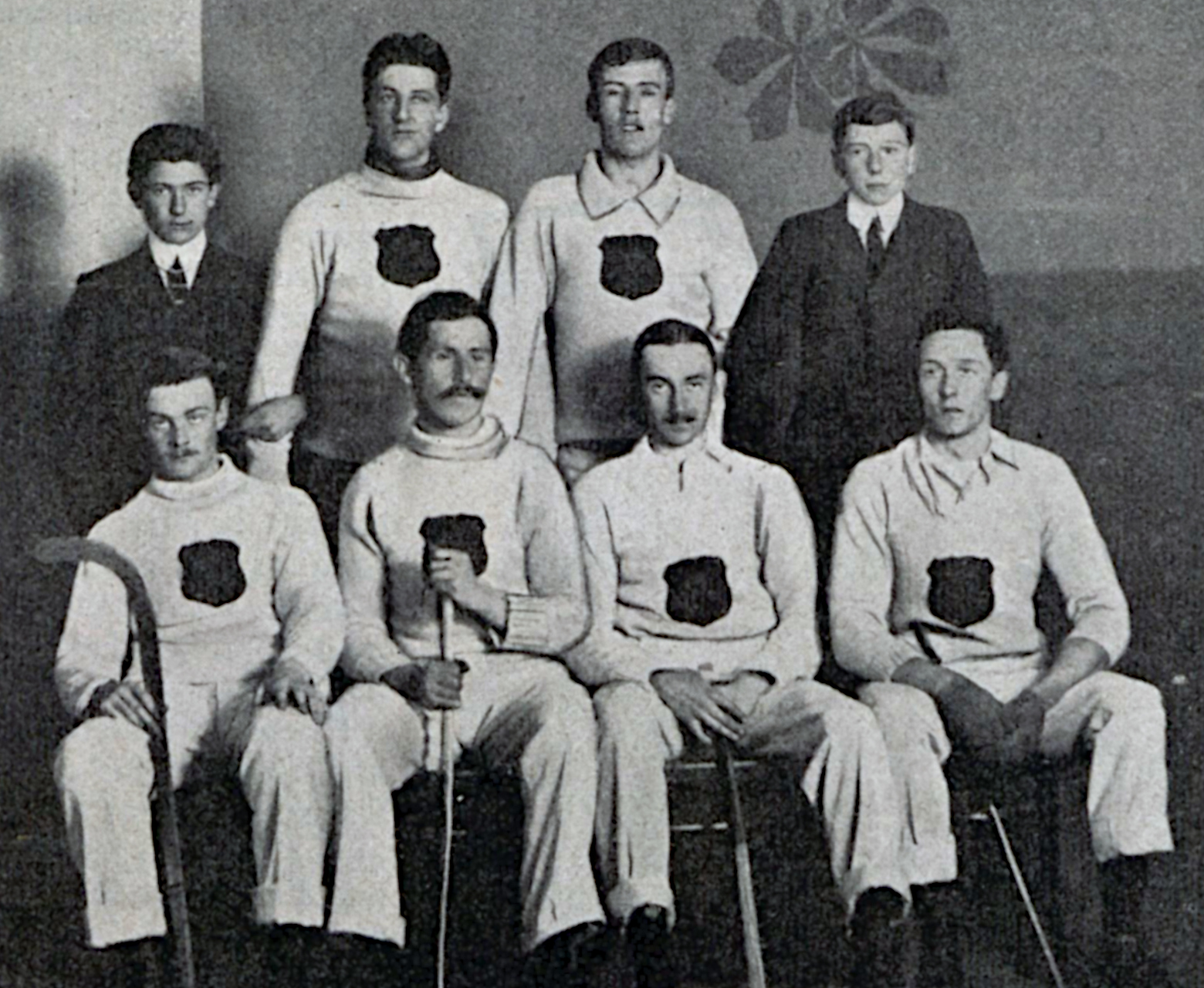
Princes Ice Hockey Club in 1904.

Princes Ice Hockey Club was one of the most influential early European ice hockey teams and is sometimes considered the first ice hockey club in Britain.

Founded in late 1896, the team was based at Prince's Skating Club in Hammersmith. They initially played three other teams founded around the same time, Niagara, Brighton and Royal Engineers. London Canadians were founded at the same rink in 1902, and both teams participated in Europe's first ice hockey league, held from November 1903 to February 1904. Princes took second position in the five-team league.

The team began taking on European opposition in 1906, playing Sporting Club de Lyon. In 1907, they played Lyon again, and also Brussels Club des Patineurs. In 1908, they faced C. P. P. Paris in the first match in Britain under Ligue Internationale de Hockey sur Glace (international) rules. That winter, they entered the first international ice hockey tournament, held in Berlin, as "England", beating Germany and France. In January 1909, again playing as England, they won a further international tournament held in Chamonix, beating France in the final after forty minutes of overtime.

Over the next few years, along with London Canadians' successors, Oxford Canadians, Princes began taking European tours to popularise the game and encourage the standardisation of rules. However, with the outbreak of World War I, Princes Skating Club closed, and with it the ice hockey team.

In 1927, a new Princes team were founded, playing out of the Westminster rink. They moved to Queens in 1930 and entered the first season of the English League the following year, but in 1932 merged into Queens Ice Hockey Club.
