= Petty France, Westminster =

Street in London, England

Coordinates: 51°29′58″N 0°8′10″W

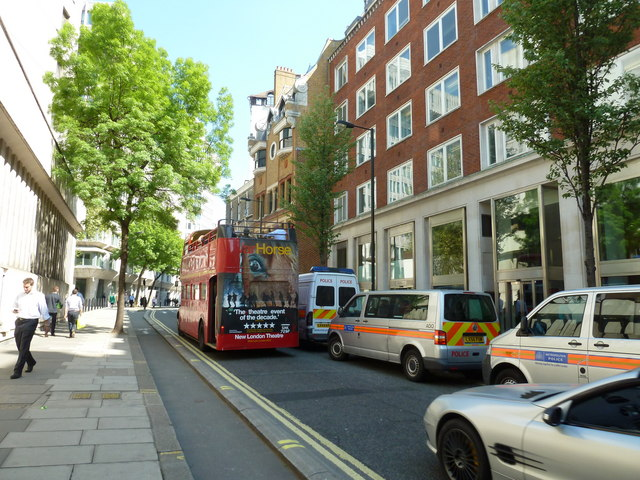
Petty France

Petty France, formerly known as York Street, is a street in the City of Westminster, linking Buckingham Gate with Broadway and Queen Anne's Gate.

Among the buildings that line the street is 102 Petty France, which currently houses the Ministry of Justice. The Charity Commission for England and Wales is also headquartered on the street.

== History ==
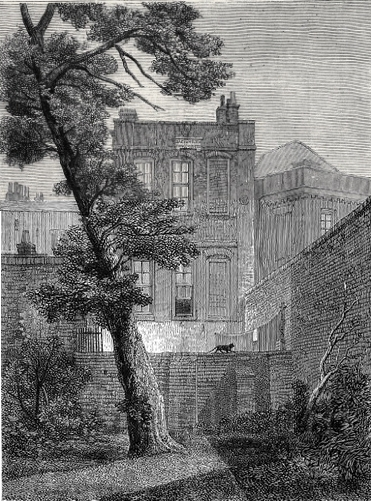
The back of No. 19, York Street (1848). In 1651 John Milton moved into a "pretty garden-house" in Petty France. He lived there until the Restoration. Later it became No. 19 York Street, belonged to Jeremy Bentham, was occupied successively by James Mill and William Hazlitt, and finally demolished in 1877.

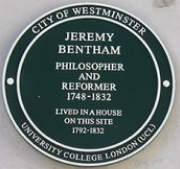
Jeremy Bentham lived in a house next to 19 York street. The commemorative plaque was unveiled on 12 October 2004.

In A New View of London (1708) Edward Hatton wrote: 'Petit France' [sic], a considerable street between Tothill Street Westminster E and James Street W ... Stow says here was built 20 houses for poor women to dwell in rent free, by Cornelius Van Dun, a Brabanter, Yeoman of the Guard to King Henry VIII, King Edward VI, Queen Mary and Queen Elizabeth.'

The name is generally thought to refer to the settlement of Huguenot refugees in the area. However, John Stow wrote of Petty France in A Survey of London (1598) and it is uncertain whether Huguenot refugees would have formed a notable community at that time. The London Encyclopaedia (1983, rev 1993) refers to the name deriving from the French wool merchants who used to live there.

The name is also used to refer to the area in the vicinity of the street, the 7th Ward of Westminster. There are similar street names elsewhere in London: e.g. a short street in Billingsgate in the City of London called Petty Wales.

In the second half of the 18th century, "the name was changed to York Street from [Edward], Duke of York, son of George II, who had made a temporary residence amongst them". (Note: Between 1746 and 1792 (Schürer 2012, p. 205).) It retained this name until around 1925, when its previous name was restored. (Note: In 1923 it was still called York Street, (Russan & Russan 1923, p. 230) and by 1927 it had been renamed Petty France (SFP staff 1927, p. 6).)

In 1719, a house was acquired in Petty France to accommodate the Westminster Infirmary. It was the first street in London to be paved for pedestrians, and it was the location of the first custom-built artificial ice-rink in London, called Niagara, which opened in the late 1890s. The street was also the home for 50 years until 2002 of the London passport office at Clive House; it is now located at Globe House in Eccleston Square, Victoria.

== See also ==
- Queen Anne's Mansions – Early block of flats in London
- John Cleland (1709–1789), journalist and the author of Fanny Hill, lived and died in a house on Petty France.
