= Oxford Shooting Stars =

- City: Oxford, United Kingdom
- Founded: 2010
- Home arena: Oxford Ice Rink, Oxpens Road; Capacity: 1,025; Ice size: 184 × 85 feet
- Colours: Green and yellow
- Head coach: Peter Smith
- Captain: James Schall
- Website: https://www.oxfordshootingstars.com/

The Oxford Shooting Stars are a recreational ice hockey team based in Oxford, England. The team currently plays teams which are registered under the EIHA Recreational Section.

== History and ethos ==
The club was founded in 2010 by ice hockey enthusiasts keen to create a beginner-friendly environment which would attract new participants into the sport. Despite many experienced players now being members of the club, players new to the sport, and of any ability, are continually joining.

The team train on a Tuesday night (11pm-12:30am outside University term-time, 11pm-12:00 in University term-time) and play games at the weekends (late night Saturday for home games Sept-April, tea-time Saturday and Sunday May–August).

The club played its first game on Saturday 11 December 2010 (against Slough Scorpions) and had its first win on Saturday 15 January 2011 (against Swindon Rec Wildcats).

The club joined the newly formed SHL cup in the summer of 2012.

In May 2014 the club travelled to Lyon France for a tournament where they finished 3rd place.

== 2013-2014 Roster ==
- Matty Davies D (GB)
- Adam Cooke D (GB)
- Alex Woollam F (GB)
- Chris Povey F (GB)
- Clay Wesebberg F (CAN)
- Dusan Lepis F (SVK)
- Ed Mifkovic F (SVK)
- Grant Blake D (GB)
- James Bird D (GB)
- James Schall D/F (SWI)
- Karen Davenport F (GB)
- Kieran Wheeler F (GB)
- Lee Merill D (GB)
- Maria Hobday D (GB)
- Martin Bureau D (CAN)
- Matthew Walton D (GB)
- Matus Michalwk D/F/NM (SVK)
- Mikko Vaisanen F (FIN)
- Nancy Carpenter D (GB)
- Oliver Parker F (GB)
- Peter Mokris D (SVK)
- Petr Larysc NM (CZE)
- Rob Newnes NM/D (GB)
- Rob Poulter F (GB)
- Stephen Edwards F (GB)
- Steve Lygo F (GB)
- Thomas Clavier (FRA)
- Thomas Kosar F (SVK)
- Toni Mrowetz F(GER)
- Jean-Baptiste Receveur D (FRA)
- Matthew Weir F (NZ)

== 2011-12 Roster ==
- Jessica Barker F (GB)
- Ray Borland F (GB)
- Enki Cheung F (HK)
- Paddy Cleary F/NM (GB)
- Adam Cooke D (GB)
- Karen Davenport F (GB)
- Matty Davies D (GB)
- Chris Fisher F/D (GB)
- Lewis Graham F (GB)
- Sam Ellis D (GB)
- Adam Hall F (GB)
- Adam Hartree D/NM (GB)
- Andrew Hastings F (GB)
- Maria Hobday D (GB)
- Tom Kosar F (SVK)
- Roman Kuzma F (SVK)
- Stevie Lygo F (GB)
- Jayson Lyon F/D (GB)
- Ginny Matthews F (GB)
- Lee Merrill D (GB)
- Matus Michalek D/F/NM (SVK)
- Dan Mills F (GB)
- Rob Newnes F (GB)
- James Rudge D (GB)
- Andy Rush F (GB)
- Hiro Saito NM (JAP)
- Nat Sinclair NM (GB)
- Mikko Vaisanen D/F (FIN)
- Clay Wesenberg F (CAN)

== Notable former players ==
- Cyrus Amini F (GB)
- Ben Ashby F (GB)
- Nancy Barker D (GB)
- Alex Benwell D (GB)
- Martin Bureau D (CAN)
- Ian Coombes F (GB)
- Andre Dalcher F (GB)
- Ron DeGiorgio D (MAL)
- J-F Gagne D (CAN)
- David Gomm F (GB)
- Gareth Jones F (GB)
- James McDougall F (GB)
- Cormac O'Keefe (IRE)
- Chris McHugh F (GB)
- Ian Ohr F (GB)
- Lawrence Orsborn F (GB)
- Niki Pidduck NM (GB)
- Jake Reich D (GB)
- Kevin Robertson F (GB)
- Kat Smith F (GB)
- Peter Smith F/D (GB)

== See also ==
- Oxford Ice Rink
- Oxford City Stars
