= Oxford Ice Rink =

Ice arena in Oxford, United Kingdom

Coordinates: 51°44′54″N 1°15′54″W

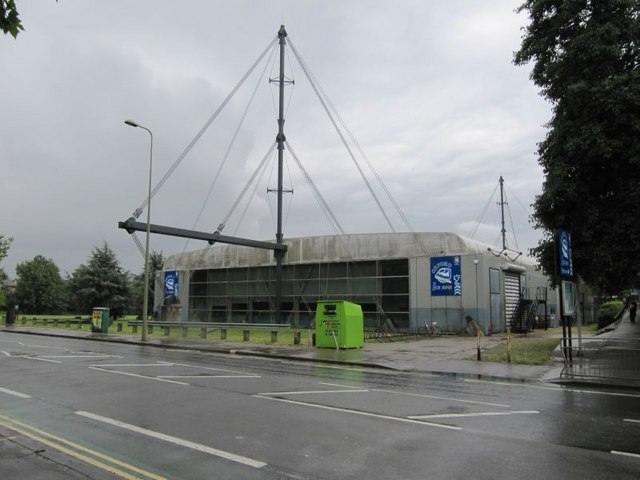
Oxford Ice Rink

Oxford Ice Rink is a 56 × 26m ice rink with capacity for 1025, located on Oxpens Road in Oxford, England. It is a ten-minute walk from Oxford city centre and railway station.

In 1980, money was raised by the Oxford Ice Skating Trust (OXIST) for the construction of a new ice rink — a project that was taken over by the Oxford City Council, who continue to own and manage the premises. The rink, designed by Nicholas Grimshaw, was built on Oxpens Road (known as Nun's Walk prior to 1850) and opened in 1984 with an ice hockey match between the Oxford City Stars and the Oxford University Ice Hockey Club. It looks like a ship, thanks to two 30-metre masts at each end. The north end of the building is fully glazed, allowing plenty of natural light into the rink.

The rink offers public and disco. Both group and individual lessons in figure skating and ice dance are available from BITA qualified instructors.

Since 31 March 2009, all of Oxford Leisure, including the Oxford Ice Rink has been run by Fusion-Lifestyle Ltd. This assured the future of the rink for the duration of the contract with Fusion, who will oversee the refurbishment of the facility.

In November 2015, The Twentieth Century Society applied for the ice rink to become a Listed building, citing it as a "fantastic example of High-Tech industrial architecture." The application was unsuccessful.

The rink suffered a chemical leak in August 2024 during work to relay the ice, leading to five fire engines and a decontamination and environmental protection unit being called to the scene.

== Ice hockey ==
Oxford Ice Rink is the home to several ice hockey teams including:

- Oxford City Stars
- Oxford Junior Stars
- Oxford University Ice Hockey Club
- Oxford Shooting Stars
