= Belgian Village on the Thames =

Belgian community in England

Coordinates: 51.4545°N 0.3048°W

The Belgian Village on the Thames was a community of Belgian refugees that settled around East Twickenham and Richmond after the beginning of the First World War. The community was centred on the Pelabon munitions factory, run by an industrialist Charles Pelabon, where many of the refugees found work.

== History ==
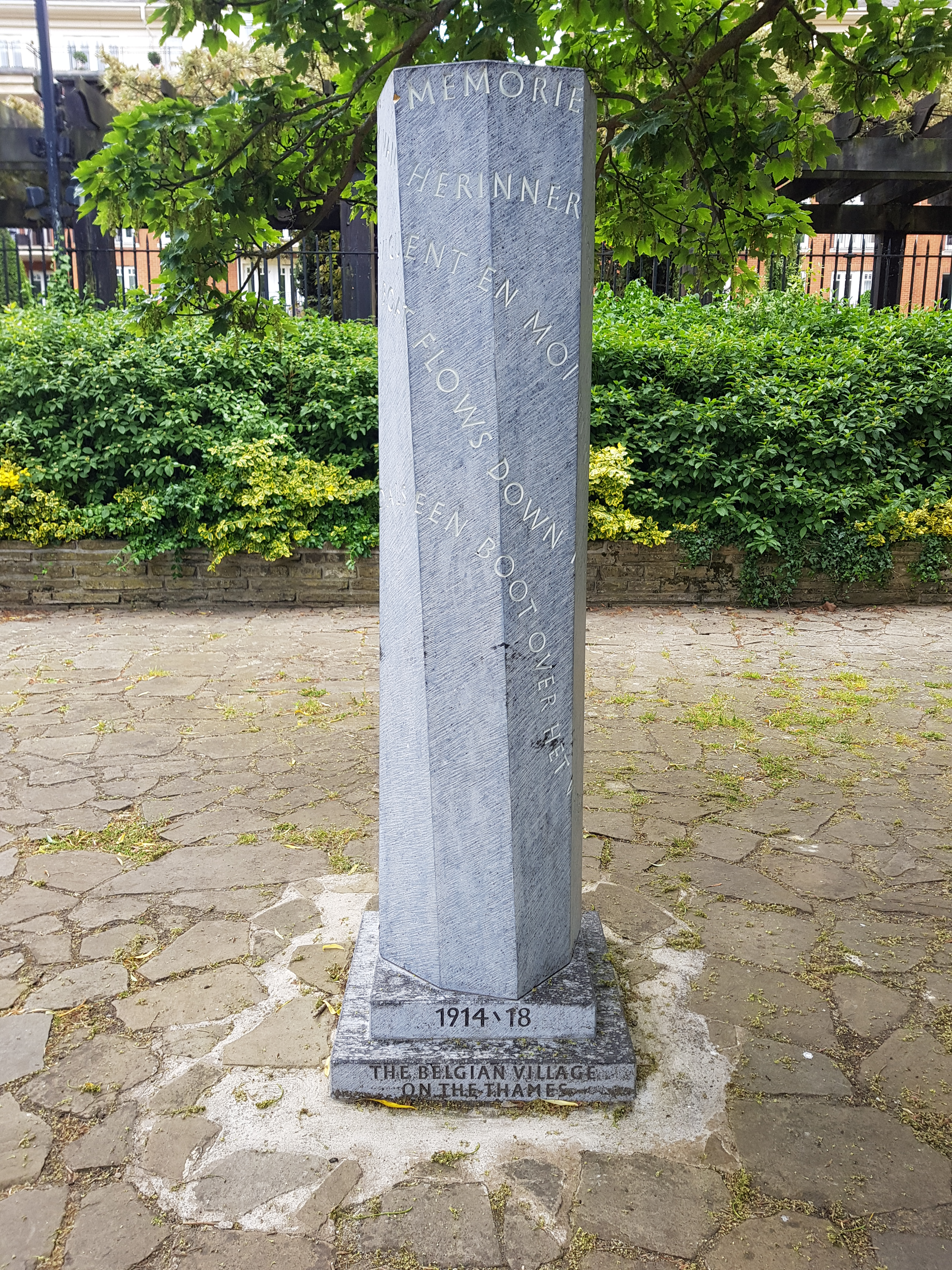
The memorial dedicated to the community in 2017

Following the outbreak of the First World War, Belgian was invaded by Germany. many Belgians moved to England as refugees, including industrialist Charles Pelabon who would set up a munitions factory on the banks of Thames in East Twickenham. The term Belgian Village on the Thames was coined by writer Paul Gérardy under the pseudonym Justin Wallon. It describes the communities of Belgians who settled along the Thames.

Richmond and Twickenham before the outbreak of war were affluent areas at the time separated from London physically and politically. Belgian arrivals came in limited number at the outbreak of war, with a larger wave following the fall of Antwerp, directed to Richmond and Twickenham by the London War Refugees Committee, and a third and largest wave attracted by the munitions factory providing employment and community for Belgian refugees. Gérardy would place the number of Belgians in the community at a peak of 6000, although a more commonly stated estimate places it at around 2000.

=== Pelabon Works ===
The Pelabon works was established by industrialist who had previously run factories in Belgium, he had moved to East Twickenham following the war, where he had met resistance for his factories by locals as well as the Twickenham and Richmond councils. An agreement was reached in 1915 to allow Pelabon to run the factory until 1921 when the council would be able to buy back the land. Production would continue through the shell crisis.

While the number of Belgians working at the factory was similar to other communities in the country, Pelabon's factory was considered a Belgian enterprise and, while not exclusively, overwhelmingly employed Belgians. The Pelabon works also employed a large number of women who were occasionally referred to as "canary girls" in reference to yellowing skin often attributed to liver damage caused by exposure to chemicals in explosive manufacturing, however it was more likely caused by cordite propellant.

The significant numbers of Belgians in Richmond and Twickenham as well as the Pelabon works at the centre of many of their lives made the area well known as a cohesive refugee community locally as well as in Belgian expatriate press. It also became the centre of the axis of the Belgian community along the Thames down the river towards London. The works would be replaced by the Richmond Ice Rink.

=== Post-War ===
After the war, the Belgian community quickly returned to Belgium both from Government initiatives and willingness of the community to return home. The community left a limited impact on the area and has since been characterised for its transience. By 2015, a memorial fund had opened to create a monument in memory of the community, which was finally erected in 2017.
