= London Canadians =

English amateur ice hockey team

- City: London, England
- Operated: 1902–?1906
- Home arena: Prince's Skating Club

The London Canadians were an English amateur ice hockey team. They played during the early part of the 20th century. Formed primarily of Canadian expats, they were the first English champions, after winning the first ice hockey league to be played in Europe.
