= Richmond Ice Rink =

Ice skating venue in London, England

- Interactive map of Richmond Ice Rink
- Location: Clevedon Road, Twickenham, London Borough of Richmond upon Thames
- Coordinates: 51°27′18″N 0°18′22″W

Construction
- Opened: 1928
- Closed: 1992
- Demolished: 1992

Richmond Ice Rink was an ice skating rink at Clevedon Road, Twickenham, formerly in Middlesex and now in the London Borough of Richmond upon Thames. When it opened, in 1928, it had the longest ice surface in any indoor rink in the world and it soon became the premier rink in London. The rink closed in 1992 and the building was demolished.

== History ==
=== The site ===
Richmond Ice Rink in a sense replaced a roller-skating rink at a very similar location. This had been built before the First World War on Cambridge Road, East Twickenham, part of the lands of the historic Cambridge House owned by the poet Richard Owen Cambridge and his son Archdeacon George Cambridge. The disused rink was bought in 1914 by the French industrialist Charles Pelabon for use as a munitions factory. He built four or five more workshops over the extensive site, and one of the last was the red-brick riverside building of 1915 which later became Richmond Ice Rink. From 1914 to 1919 up to 6,000 Belgian refugees, some of them injured soldiers, settled and established a community in the Twickenham and Richmond area after the Germans invaded their country, many of which became workers at the factory.

=== The new rink ===
After the war almost all the Belgian refugees returned home, but Charles Pelabon continued to use the site for general engineering until 1924. He then sold it to Charles Langdon, who had developed the ice rink at Hammersmith. He converted the factory into an ice rink which opened on 18 December 1928. All the skating clubs that had previously been based at the ice-rinks at Hammersmith and Earl's Court transferred to Richmond, making it the premier rink in London.

When it opened in 1928 the ice surface (286 ft long by 80 ft wide) was the longest in any indoor rink in the world. However, it was shortened to 200 feet in 1935.

Joachim von Ribbentrop, appointed German Ambassador to Britain in 1936, bought a house next door to the ice rink; his hobby was ice dancing and he reputedly spent his evenings skating and socialising at the rink.

At the outbreak of the Second World War in 1939 the rink was ordered to close, but the American Embassy subsequently persuaded the British Government to allow it to reopen for the use of American servicemen who played ice hockey there.

=== People/activities ===
Arnold Gerschwiler was head coach at the Richmond Ice Rink from 1938 and was made director in 1964 until its demolition in 1992. Betty Callaway, best known for coaching Jayne Torvill and Christopher Dean, the 1984 Olympic ice-skating champions, became a skating coach at the rink in 1950.

Richmond Ice Rink also was the home ice for several ice hockey teams. Richmond Flyers which played at premier league level in the British Hockey League was perhaps the most successful, under then coach Alec Goldstone.

It was the home of Aldwych Speed Club a very successful short track speed skating club, from 1934 until the rink's closure in 1992, when the club moved briefly to Basingstoke then its current home at Guildford Spectrum.

=== Closure and demolition ===
The rink was sold in 1978 to a property developer, who kept it running until 1987, when it was bought by another property company, the London and Edinburgh Trust, then chaired by John Beckwith and his brother Peter, who intended to develop the site for luxury housing. The planning consent stipulated that the company had to construct a new rink on an alternative site in the borough. In 1989, Richmond upon Thames Council accepted £2.5 million as compensation and withdrew this condition.

In 1992, the rink closed and the building was demolished. No replacement rink has been built.

== See also ==
- Richmond Flyers
- Richmond Trophy
- St. Ivel International
