= Niagara Ice Hockey Club =

UK ice hockey team

The Niagara Ice Hockey Club were an early ice hockey team in the United Kingdom. They played at the Niagara Ice Rink, York Street (now called Petty France), close to St James's Park tube station in London. (Note: Niagara was the first artificial ice skating rink in London (SFP staff 1927).) Contemporary accounts of the early history of British ice hockey refer to Niagara being the first English club champions in 1898.
