= London Lions (ice hockey) =

1970s English professional ice hockey team

1973–74 London Lions logo

The London Lions were an independent professional ice hockey team in London, England, that played 72 games during the 1973–74 season against the top European hockey teams. It was started by Detroit Red Wings owner Bruce Norris with a vision of building a league to be affiliated with the National Hockey League (NHL). The vice-chairman of the team was John Ziegler, who went on to become president of the NHL in 1977.

The Lions played their home games at Wembley Arena and had a record of 52 wins, 13 losses and 7 ties. They toured Europe to promote a proposed European professional ice hockey league, originally scheduled to start for the 1974–75 season. The original plan for this new league was to have the top teams participate in the Stanley Cup playoffs against the traditional North American NHL teams. The league did not gain support and never started play.

Original London Lions logo

The team was named for an earlier London Lions, which was founded in 1924 by Blane Sexton, played at Westminster from 1927, then at Golders Green and the Hammersmith Palais until 1934, when they moved to Wembley Arena as the Wembley Lions. In 1930, they won the first ever British Championship.
