= Cambridge University Ice Hockey Club =

University's ice hockey club

Cambridge University
- City: Cambridge, England
- League: BUIHA
- Founded: 1885
- Home arena: Cambridge Ice Arena
- Colours: Light blue and white
- Owner(s): University sports club
- General manager: Simrat "Sim" Sodhi & Martin "Marty" Limback-Stokin
- Head coach: Prof. Bill Harris
- Website: CUIHC

Cambridge University Ice Hockey Club at the University of Cambridge, Cambridge, England, is one of the oldest ice hockey teams in the world.

While the team claims a history dating back to 1885, the first strong evidence for their existence comes on 16 March 1900, when they played Oxford University Ice Hockey Club in the first Ice Hockey Varsity Match, at Princes Skating Club in London, losing 7–6. This match was played, on Oxford's insistence, with bandy sticks and a lacrosse ball. The Cambridge team was led by J. J. Cawthra, who later played for England. The following day, the two universities joined to play Princes Ice Hockey Club.

Cambridge played a second varsity match at Princes in 1901, this time winning 6–5. In 1903, they entered the first ice hockey league in Europe, but came last out of the five teams competing.

The squad then switched to playing European tours, popularising the sport, and from 1909 to 1913 and 1920 onwards playing an annual varsity match. From 1932, these matches were played in England, and although no longer able to compete with the top professional sides, they were watched by over 10,000 supporters.

In 1931, the club joined the English League, but when it finished in 1936 they did not follow most of the teams into the English National League, instead joining the lower-level London and Provincial League in 1938. In 1948, they played a season in the Southern Intermediate League, and in the 1970s they played two seasons in the Southern League. They then joined the Inter-City League and finally played in the inaugural season of the British Hockey League. Since then, they have contested an annual varsity match and compete in Division One of the British Universities Ice Hockey Association. Until 2019, when the Cambridge Ice Arena was completed, the team had to travel to Planet Ice Peterborough to train. This new full-size rink is the team's first permanent home, located adjacent to the Newmarket Road Park & Ride site.
