= English League (ice hockey) =

Early ice hockey league in England

The English League was an early ice hockey league in England. It was founded in 1931 and operated until 1936 when it disbanded, being replaced by the English National League.

A new league of the same name was founded during 1988 and continued on until 1997.

== Champions ==
- 1931-32 Oxford University
- 1932-33 Oxford University
- 1933-34 Grosvenor House Canadians
- 1934-35 Streatham
- 1935-36 Birmingham Maple Leafs
- 1988-89 Humberside Seahawks
- 1989-90 Bracknell Bees
- 1990-91 Oxford City Stars
- 1991-92 Medway Bears
- 1992-93 Solihull Barons
- 1993-94 Wightlink Raiders
- 1994-95 Wightlink Raiders
- 1995-96 Wightlink Raiders
- 1996-97 Wightlink Raiders

== See also ==
- British ice hockey league champions
