= Oxford University Ice Hockey Club =

University's ice hockey club

- City: Oxford, England
- League: BUIHA
- Home arena: Oxford Ice Rink
- Colours: Oxford blue, white, off-white
- President: Eli Harris-Trent

The Oxford University Ice Hockey Club (OUIHC) is home to the men's and women's Blues ice hockey teams of the University of Oxford, England. The men's Blues, also known as Oxford University Blues, is one of the world's oldest ice hockey teams. Tradition places the origin of the team in 1885, when a match is said to have been played against Cambridge University Ice Hockey Club in St. Moritz, Switzerland. This date is recognised by the Hockey Hall of Fame, and prior to the 1985 Ice Hockey Varsity Match, the International Ice Hockey Federation (IIHF) formally recognised the 1885 game as the first ice hockey match played in Europe. However, there is no contemporary evidence that this match took place, and Oxford now claims that this was a bandy match.

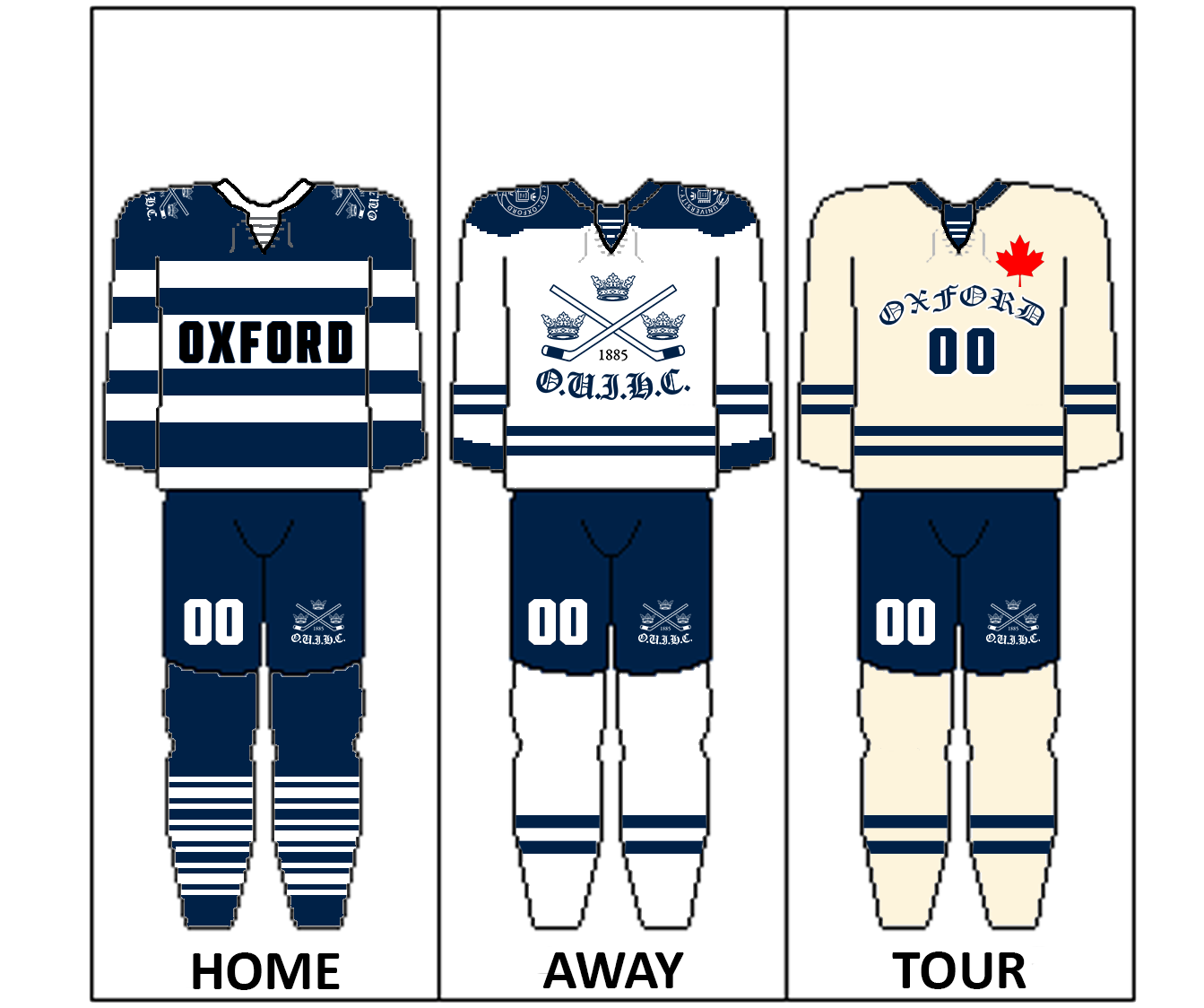
The Oxford home, away and tour jerseys

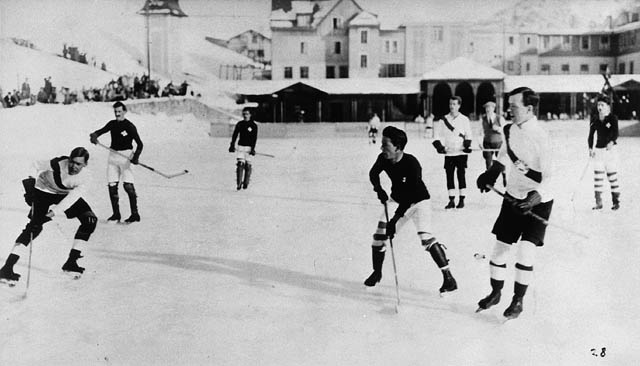
Ice hockey in Europe; Oxford University vs. Switzerland, 1922. Future Canadian Prime Minister Lester B. Pearson is at right front.

Oxford University Mens Blues
- Conference: Southern Conference
- Division: Division 1 (Checking)
- Founded: 1885
- Captain: Michael Furlan

Oxford University Womens Blues
- Conference: Southern Conference
- Division: Division 1 (Non-Checking)
- Founded: 1981
- Captain: Julia Edgar & Mira-Rose Kingsbury Lee

Oxford University Vikings A
- Nickname: "Vikes"
- Conference: Southern Conference
- Division: Division 2 (Checking)
- Founded: 1920
- Captain: Dan Ulik

Oxford University Vikings B
- Nickname: "Bikes"
- Conference: Southern Conference
- Division: Division 1 (Non-Checking)
- Founded: 2018
- Captain: Campbell MacKinnon & Jack Fulford

Oxford University Vikings C
- Nickname: "Trikes"
- Conference: Southern Conference
- Division: Division 3 (Non-Checking)
- Founded: 2023
- Captain: Josh Appleby & Will Murden

== History ==
The oldest surviving evidence of their existence is a team photo and roster from 1895, when they played Cambridge in another bandy match at Blenheim Palace. In 1900, they played Cambridge at Princes Skating Club in the first official Varsity Match, winning 7–6. Their captain in this match was future cricketer Bernard Bosanquet.

With the introduction of the Rhodes Scholarship, the top Canadian players at the University of Oxford formed the Oxford Canadians, but after World War I, the University of Oxford team included Rhodes Scholars. Such players included Lester B. Pearson, Roland Michener, George F.G. Stanley, Clarence Campbell, Allan Blakeney, Ronald Martland and Otto Lang. Thus strengthened, it won the Spengler Cup in 1923, 1925 and 1931. In 1932, they tied the tournament with LTC Prague. In 1931, the team entered the first English League, winning both the inaugural season and the second. When the league disbanded in 1936, they did not follow most of the teams into the English National League, but in 1938 joined the lower level London and Provincial League. From 1948 to 55, they played in the Southern Intermediate League. After a long break from league competition, they entered two seasons of the Southern League in the 1970s, then joined the Inter-City League and finally played in the first season of the British Hockey League. In 2004 the Blues joined the British Universities Ice Hockey Association league. Today the team is based at the Oxford Ice Rink, and continues to compete in Division One of the BUIHA, as well as playing the annual Varsity Match against Cambridge.

== Notable former players ==
The Club attracts many Canadian students at Oxford, with most of its prominent former players assuming visible roles in Canadian public life.

- Mark Carney (Captain) - Prime Minister of Canada, former Governor of the Bank of England and former Governor of the Bank of Canada; former United Nations Special Envoy for Climate Action and Finance
- Lester B. Pearson - former Prime Minister of Canada, former Foreign Minister of Canada and Nobel Peace Prize Laureate
- Michael Spence - recipient of the 2001 Nobel Prize in Economics
- Roland Michener - former Governor General of Canada
- James Coyne - former Governor of the Bank of Canada
- David Lametti (Captain) - former Minister of Justice and Attorney General of Canada
- Otto Lang - former Minister of Justice and Attorney General of Canada
- Clarence Campbell - president of the National Hockey League from 1946 to 1977
- Ronald Martland - former Puisne Justice of the Supreme Court of Canada
- H. Ian Macdonald - former President of York University and Chairman of Hockey Canada (1987-1994), responsible for Canada's Olympic and World Championship hockey programme
- George F. Stanley - former Lieutenant-Governor of New Brunswick and designer of the current Canadian flag
- Danny Williams - former Premier of Newfoundland and Labrador
- Allan Blakeney - former Premier of Saskatchewan
- Robert Gordon Robertson - former Commissioner of the Northwest Territories and Chancellor of Carleton University
- John McCall MacBain (Captain) - Canadian billionaire businessman and philanthropist, dubbed the “Second Century Founder of the Rhodes Scholarship” for his £75 million donation to the Rhodes Trust
- Charles Herbert Little - Canadian Director of Naval Intelligence during the Second World War
- Edward Pitblado - Olympic ice hockey bronze medallist
- William Feindel - Canadian neurosurgeon and Chancellor of Acadia University, who developed positron-emission tomography for medical imaging
- Gordon Blair - former judge, Member of Parliament and president of the Royal Canadian Legion
