= Ice Hockey Varsity Match =

Ice hockey club competition

The Ice Hockey Varsity Match is a longstanding competition between the Cambridge and Oxford University Ice Hockey Clubs.

== History ==
Tradition places the origin of the match in 1885, when a game is said to have been played in St Moritz. This date is recognised by the Hockey Hall of Fame, and prior to the 1985 Varsity Match, the International Ice Hockey Federation formally recognised the game played a century earlier as having been the first ice hockey match played in Europe. However, there is no contemporary evidence that the 1885 match took place, and Oxford now claim that it was a bandy match. If the 1885 date is accepted, this is the oldest rivalry in ice hockey.

The oldest surviving evidence of the competition is a team photo and roster from 1895, for a game played on Blenheim Lake in Oxford, although this was definitely a bandy match. The first match usually counted as an ice hockey contest is that of 16 March 1900 at Princes Skating Club, although at Oxford's insistence, it was played using bandy sticks and a lacrosse ball.

The following year, another Varsity Match was played at Princes, this time with hockey stick and a puck. However, a 1902 match at Blenheim Lake was again a bandy match.

The competition became established in 1909; the two universities then met each other on a European rink each year until World War I. From 1927, the match has been played for the Patton Cup, named for Peter Patton, the first President of the British Ice Hockey Association. It was then played most years until 1932, when it returned to England, being played at Richmond Ice Rink. The annual matches of the 1930s may no longer have been of professional standard, but they were able to attract crowds up to 10,000 strong. In 2016, the Patton Cup was replaced by the King Edward VII Cup.

Other than a gap during World War II, the matches have continued annually ever since, and from 1996 alternated between Oxford Ice Rink and a rink nominated by Cambridge. After a two-decade campaign, championed by Prof. Bill Harris, Cambridge University opened their own rink for the 2019-2020 season and hosted the 2020 Match. Oxford, historically strengthened by Rhodes Scholars have won more than two-thirds of the encounters.

== Results ==
No.	Date	Place	Winner	Result
1	1885 (Bandy Match)	St. Moritz	Oxford	6-0
Match not held from 1886 to 1894
2	1895 (Bandy Match)	Blenheim Lake	Oxford	6-1
Match not held from 1896 to 1899
3	1900	Princes, London	Oxford	7-6
4	1901	Princes, London	Cambridge	6-5
5	1902 (Bandy Match)	Blenheim Lake	Tie	2-2
Match not held from 1903 to 1908
6	1909	Wengen	Oxford	5-3
7	1910	Mürren	Oxford	5-3
8	1911	Mürren	Cambridge	2-0
9	1912	Mürren	Cambridge	1-0
10	1913	Mürren	Cambridge	10-0
Match not held from 1914 to 1919 due to World War I
11	1920	Mürren	Tie	0-0
12	1921	Mürren	Oxford	27-0
13	1922	Mürren	Oxford	8-1
14	1923	Mürren	Oxford	3-0
15	1926	St. Moritz	Oxford	11-0
16	1927	St. Moritz	Cambridge	3-0
17	1928	St. Moritz	Cambridge	1-0
18	1929	Zürich	Oxford	1-0
19	1930	St. Moritz	Cambridge	2-1
20	1931	St. Moritz	Oxford	5-1
21	1932	Richmond	Oxford	7-0
22	1933	Oxford	Oxford	1-0
23	1934	Oxford	Oxford	4-2
24	1935	Richmond	Oxford	3-2
25	1936	Earl's Court	Cambridge	2-0
26	1937	Harringay	Cambridge	5-1
27	1938	Site Unknown	Oxford	1-0
28	1939	Earl's Court	Cambridge	2-0
29	1940	Harringay	Oxford	4-2
Match not held from 1941 to 1946 due to World War II
30	1947	Brighton	Oxford	15-4
31	1948	Brighton	Oxford	5-2
32	1949	Richmond	Oxford	4-3
33	1950	Richmond	Oxford	3-0
34	1951	Richmond	Oxford	6-3
35	1952	Site Unknown	Cambridge	8-2
36	1953	Richmond	Oxford	5-3
37	1954	Richmond	Oxford	7-4
38	1955	Richmond	Oxford	29-0
39	1956	Richmond	Oxford	11-1
40	1957	Richmond	Oxford	5-2
41	1958	Richmond	Cambridge	6-1
42	1959	Richmond	Cambridge	13-1
43	1960	Richmond	Cambridge	6-5
44	1961	Richmond	Oxford	7-5
45	1962	Richmond	Cambridge	11-1
46	1963	Richmond	Cambridge	6-4
47	1964	Richmond	Oxford	6-4
48	1965	Richmond	Oxford	3-1
49	1966	Richmond	Oxford	16-2
50	1967	Blackpool	Oxford	18-2
51	1968	Blackpool	Oxford	14-3
52	1969	Solihull	Oxford	3-2
53	1970	Solihull	Oxford	6-1
54	1971	Blackpool	Oxford	13-5
55	1972	Blackpool	Oxford	10-0
56	1973	Billingham	Oxford	8-2
57	1974	Wembley	Oxford	5-1
58	1975	Billingham	Oxford	4-2
59	1976	Solihull	Oxford	3-1
60	1977	Solihull	Cambridge	7-4
61	1978	Solihull	Oxford	11-1
62	1979	Southampton	Oxford	5-1
63	1980	Solihull	Cambridge	5-1
64	1981	Streatham	Cambridge	6-5
65	1982	Streatham	Oxford	7-5
66	1983	Peterborough	Tie	3-3
67	1984	Streatham	Cambridge	6-3
68	1985	Peterborough	Oxford	5-1
69	1986	Oxford Ice Rink	Cambridge	8-5
70	1987	Oxford Ice Rink	Oxford	9-1
71	1988	Oxford Ice Rink	Oxford	11-3
72	1989	Oxford Ice Rink	Oxford	15-4
73	1990	Oxford Ice Rink	Oxford	18-1
74	1991	Oxford Ice Rink	Oxford	9-2
75	1992	Oxford Ice Rink	Cambridge	3-1
76	1993	Oxford Ice Rink	Oxford	19-0
77	1994	Oxford Ice Rink	Oxford	13-3
78	1995	Oxford Ice Rink	Oxford	8-4
79	1996	Oxford Ice Rink	Oxford	8-5
80	1997	Stevenage	Oxford	5-2
81	1998	Oxford Ice Rink	Cambridge	8-1
82	1999	Peterborough	Cambridge	2-1
83	2000	Oxford Ice Rink	Oxford	4-2
84	2001	Peterborough	Cambridge	12-5
85	2002	Oxford Ice Rink	Cambridge	8-1
86	2003	Peterborough	Oxford	4-3(OT)
87	2004	Oxford Ice Rink	Cambridge	5-1
88	2005	Milton Keynes	Oxford	6-1
89	2006	Oxford Ice Rink	Oxford	6-1
90	2007	Peterborough	Oxford	11-1
91	2008	Oxford Ice Rink	Oxford	8-2
92	March 2009	Planet Ice Arena Milton Keynes	Oxford	4-2
93	March 2010	Oxford Ice Rink	Oxford	6-5(OT)
94	March 2011	Peterborough	Cambridge	5-1
95	March 2012	Oxford Ice Rink	Oxford	17-1
96	March 2013	Peterborough	Cambridge	8-2
97	March 2014	Oxford Ice Rink	Oxford	13-7
98	March 2015	Peterborough	Cambridge	10-0
99	March 2016	Oxford Ice Rink	Cambridge	4-3
100	March 2017	Peterborough	Cambridge	8-3
100*	March 2018	St. Moritz	Oxford	4-3(OT)
101	March 2019	Oxford Ice Rink	Cambridge	8-1
102	March 2020	Cambridge Ice Rink	Cambridge	8-0
103	June 2021	Oxford Ice Rink	Cambridge	4-3(SO)
104	March 2022	Cambridge Ice Rink	Cambridge	4-2
105	March 2023	Oxford Ice Rink	Cambridge	4-0
106	March 2024	Cambridge Ice Rink	Cambridge	6-2
107	February 2025	Oxford Ice Rink	Oxford	3-2(OT)
108	March 2026	Cambridge Ice Rink	Cambridge	5-1

== See also ==
- List of British and Irish varsity matches
- Oxford–Cambridge rivalry
