= Bobby Lee (ice hockey) =

Canadian ice hockey player

- Born: December 28, 1911; Verdun, Quebec, Canada
- Died: December 31, 1974 (aged 63)
- Height: 5 ft 10 in (178 cm)
- Weight: 165 lb (75 kg; 11 st 11 lb)
- Position: Centre
- Shot: Left
- Played for: Baltimore Orioles; Quebec Aces; Montreal Royals; Montreal Canadiens; Wembley Lions; Earls Court Rangers; Brighton Tigers
- Playing career: 1934–1954

Robert James Lee (December 28, 1911 – December 31, 1974) was a Canadian professional ice hockey player. He played one game in the National Hockey League with the Montreal Canadiens during the 1942–43 season, on December 19, 1942, against the New York Rangers. The rest of his career, which lasted from 1934 to 1954, was mainly spent in the English National League. Bobby played with Brighton Tigers for much of his time in the UK. He was inducted to the British Ice Hockey Hall of Fame in 1949.

== Career ==
Lee played for the Baltimore Orioles in the Eastern Hockey League between 1934 and 1936, the Brighton Tigers in 1936–37 and between 1946 and 1954, the Earls Court Rangers between 1937 and 1939, the Quebec Aces between 1939 and 1942, the Montreal Royals and the Montreal Canadiens in 1942–43, and the Wembley Lions in 1945–46.

== Career statistics ==
=== Regular season and playoffs ===
			Regular season					Playoffs
Season	Team	League	GP	G	A	Pts	PIM	GP	G	A	Pts	PIM
1929–30	Queen's University	OHA Sr	9	3	0	3	0	—	—	—	—	—
1930–31	Montreal Columbus Club	MCJHL	9	4	0	4	8	—	—	—	—	—
1931–32	Queen's University	OHA Sr	—	—	—	—	—	—	—	—	—	—
1932–33	Queen's University	OHA Sr	—	—	—	—	—	—	—	—	—	—
1933–34	Montreal LaFontaine Bleus	MCJHL	15	6	2	8	10	—	—	—	—	—
1934–35	Montreal LaFontaine Bleus	MCJHL	18	9	6	15	24	—	—	—	—	—
1934–35	Baltimore Orioles	EAHL	4	0	1	1	4	9	5	2	7	4
1935–36	Baltimore Orioles	EAHL	40	19	20	39	45	8	4	6	10	15
1936–37	Brighton Tigers	ENL	36	32	21	53	32	—	—	—	—	—
1937–38	Earls Court Rangers	ENL	—	14	8	22	17	—	—	—	—	—
1938–39	Earls Court Rangers	ENL	—	13	19	32	—	—	—	—	—	—
1939–40	Quebec Aces	QSHL	30	8	13	21	27	—	—	—	—	—
1940–41	Quebec Aces	QSHL	36	14	24	38	15	4	3	1	4	2
1941–42	Quebec Aces	QSHL	40	20	30	50	10	7	0	7	7	2
1941–42	Quebec Aces	Al-Cup	—	—	—	—	—	8	5	8	13	4
1942–43	Montreal Canadiens	NHL	1	0	0	0	0	—	—	—	—	—
1942–43	Montreal Royals	QSHL	33	14	20	34	26	4	1	0	1	2
1942–43	Montreal RCAF	MCHL	—	—	—	—	—	5	2	2	4	4
1943–44	Montreal Royals	QSHL	7	1	4	5	2	—	—	—	—	—
1943–44	Montreal Canada Car	MCHL	6	1	10	11	2	—	—	—	—	—
1943–44	Montreal RCAF	MNDHL	8	8	12	20	4	4	4	7	11	6
1944–45	Toronto RCAF	SNL	—	—	—	—	—	—	—	—	—	—
1945–46	Wembley Lions	ENL	—	—	—	—	—	—	—	—	—	—
1946–47	Brighton Tigers	ENL	36	57	54	111	22	2	3	2	5	8
1947–48	Brighton Tigers	ENL	35	45	41	86	22	—	—	—	—	—
1948–49	Brighton Tigers	ENL	28	20	31	51	12	—	—	—	—	—
1949–50	Brighton Tigers	ENL	9	2	8	10	2	—	—	—	—	—
1950–51	Brighton Tigers	ENL	30	12	13	25	2	—	—	—	—	—
1951–52	Brighton Tigers	ENL	30	22	15	37	10	—	—	—	—	—
1952–53	Brighton Tigers	ENL	30	8	7	15	6	—	—	—	—	—
1953–54	Brighton Tigers	ENL	24	23	25	48	14	—	—	—	—	—
NHL totals			1	0	0	0	0	—	—	—	—	—

== See also ==
- List of players who played only one game in the NHL
