= Joe Shack =

Canadian ice hockey player

- Born: December 8, 1915 Winnipeg, Manitoba, Canada
- Died: May 5, 1987 (aged 71) London, England, GBR
- Height: 5 ft 10 in (178 cm)
- Weight: 170 lb (77 kg; 12 st 2 lb)
- Position: Left wing
- Shot: Left
- Played for: New York Rangers; Harringay Greyhounds; Harringay Racers; Dunfermline Vikings
- Playing career: 1948–1958

Joseph Shack (December 8, 1915 – May 5, 1987) was a Canadian professional ice hockey left winger. He played 70 games in the National Hockey League for the New York Rangers during the 1942–43 and 1944–45 seasons. The rest of his career, which lasted from 1935 to 1955, was spent in the minor leagues and then in the British leagues. Shack was born in Winnipeg, Manitoba, and grew up in Montreal, Quebec.

== Career statistics ==
=== Regular season and playoffs ===
			Regular season					Playoffs
Season	Team	League	GP	G	A	Pts	PIM	GP	G	A	Pts	PIM
1933–34	Elmwood Maple Leafs	MJHL	11	14	2	16	0	2	0	1	1	2
1934–35	Elmwood Maple Leafs	MJHL	10	6	7	13	16	4	2	1	3	6
1935–36	Elmwood Millionaires	MHL	10	6	3	9	15	3	0	1	1	2
1936–37	Harringay Greyhounds	ENL	24	18	9	27	12	—	—	—	—	—
1937–38	Harringay Greyhounds	ENL	—	11	17	28	—	—	—	—	—	—
1938–39	Harringay Greyhounds	ENL	—	27	26	53	—	—	—	—	—	—
1939–40	Ottawa Senators	QSHL	28	10	17	27	16	—	—	—	—	—
1940–41	Ottawa Senators	QSHL	35	21	21	42	22	8	3	1	4	8
1941–42	New Haven Eagles	AHL	56	16	29	45	12	2	0	0	0	0
1942–43	New York Rangers	NHL	20	5	9	14	6	—	—	—	—	—
1943–44	Ottawa Commandos	QSHL	19	7	16	23	11	3	0	4	4	0
1943–44	Montreal Vickers	MCHL	12	10	10	20	14	—	—	—	—	—
1944–45	New York Rangers	NHL	50	4	18	22	14	—	—	—	—	—
1945–46	St. Paul Saints	USHL	51	28	31	59	37	6	0	1	1	4
1946–47	St. Paul Saints	USHL	55	25	30	55	29	—	—	—	—	—
1947–48	St. Paul Saints	USHL	62	12	31	43	19	—	—	—	—	—
1948–49	Harringay Greyhounds	ENL	17	11	16	27	8	—	—	—	—	—
1948–49	Harringay Racers	ENL	28	28	41	69	34	—	—	—	—	—
1949–50	Harringay Racers	ENL	57	30	52	82	62	—	—	—	—	—
1950–51	Harringay Racers	ENL	44	36	40	76	62	—	—	—	—	—
1951–52	Harringay Racers	ENL	59	41	51	92	62	—	—	—	—	—
1952–53	Harringay Racers	ENL	60	57	56	113	86	—	—	—	—	—
1953–54	Harringay Racers	ENL	24	16	14	30	47	—	—	—	—	—
1954–55	Dunfermline Vikings	BNL	17	11	16	27	8	—	—	—	—	—
NHL totals			70	9	27	36	20	—	—	—	—	—
