= Gordon Poirier =

Canadian ice hockey player

- Born: October 27, 1914; Maple Creek, Saskatchewan, Canada
- Died: May 25, 1972 (aged 57); Beaconsfield, Quebec, Canada
- Height: 5 ft 6 in (168 cm)
- Weight: 150 lb (68 kg; 10 st 10 lb)
- Position: Centre
- Shot: Left
- Played for: HC Diavoli Rossoneri Milano; Brighton Tigers; Montreal Canadiens; Harringay Racers
- Playing career: 1931–1951

Gordon Arthur Poirier (October 27, 1914 – May 25, 1972) was a Canadian professional ice hockey player. He played ten games in the National Hockey League for the Montreal Canadiens during the 1939–40 season. The rest of his career, which lasted from 1931 to 1951, was mainly spent in the English National League and Quebec Senior Hockey League. Poirier was born in Maple Creek, Saskatchewan, but grew up in Montreal, Quebec. He was inducted into the British Ice Hockey Hall of Fame in 1948.

== Playing career ==
Poirier also played two seasons, 1933–34 and 1935–36, as player-coach with HC Diavoli Rossoneri Milano in the Italian Serie A where he helped the team win the league championship in 1935–36.

Poirer played a total of six seasons, three before and three after the Second World War, for the Brighton Tigers in the English National League. He helped the Tigers win the league championship in 1946–47 and 1947–48 and won the English Autumn Cup in 1946. He finished his career after spending the 1950–51 season with the Harringay Racers, also in the English National League.

== Career statistics ==
=== Regular season and playoffs ===
			Regular season					Playoffs
Season	Team	League	GP	G	A	Pts	PIM	GP	G	A	Pts	PIM
1931–32	Montreal Columbus Club	QAHA	10	6	2	8	14	—	—	—	—	—
1932–33	Montreal Saint Francis Xavier	MCHL	11	4	0	4	15	2	1	0	1	6
1933–34	Montreal Senior Canadiens	MTL Sr	15	1	1	2	8	4	1	2	3	0
1934–35	Montreal Senior Canadiens	MTL Sr	20	7	11	18	20	2	1	1	2	0
1936–37	Brighton Tigers	ENL	40	25	9	34	36	—	—	—	—	—
1937–38	Brighton Tigers	ENL	—	9	12	21	10	—	—	—	—	—
1938–39	Brighton Tigers	ENL	—	14	15	29	—	—	—	—	—	—
1939–40	Montreal Canadiens	NHL	10	0	1	1	0	—	—	—	—	—
1939–40	Saint-Hyacinthe Gaulois	QPHL	36	37	43	80	22	—	—	—	—	—
1940–41	Ottawa-Montreal	QSHL	29	8	23	31	16	8	0	5	5	10
1941–42	Ottawa Senators	QSHL	40	21	19	40	12	8	1	4	5	13
1942–43	Ottawa Commandos	QSHL	32	17	14	31	19	22	13	5	18	10
1942–43	Ottawa Army	OCHL	10	15	16	31	5	—	—	—	—	—
1943–44	Ottawa Commandos	QSHL	8	2	6	8	6	—	—	—	—	—
1945–46	Ottawa GMC's	OCHL	—	9	13	22	—	4	6	10	16	—
1946–47	Brighton Tigers	EHL	36	28	32	60	35	—	—	—	—	—
1947–48	Brighton Tigers	EHL	47	31	31	62	44	—	—	—	—	—
1948–49	Brighton Tigers	EHL	39	30	41	71	59	—	—	—	—	—
1950–51	Harringay Racers	EHL	40	2	12	14	20	—	—	—	—	—
EHL totals			—	139	152	291	—	—	—	—	—	—
NHL totals			10	0	1	1	0	—	—	—	—	—
