= James Haggarty =

Canadian ice hockey player (1914–1998)

- Born: April 14, 1914 Port Arthur, Ontario, Canada
- Died: March 8, 1998 (aged 83) Montreal, Quebec, Canada
- Height: 5 ft 11 in (180 cm)
- Weight: 167 lb (76 kg; 11 st 13 lb)
- Position: Left Wing
- Shot: Left
- Played for: Montreal Canadiens; Wembley Monarchs; Wembley Canadians
- National team: Canada
- Playing career: 1934–1950
Medal record
Representing Canada
Olympic Games
Silver medal – second place	1936 Garmisch-Partenkirchen	Team

James Timothy Haggarty (April 14, 1914 – March 8, 1998) was a Canadian ice hockey player. He played 5 games in the National Hockey League with the Montreal Canadiens during the 1941–42 season. The rest of his career, which lasted from 1934 to 1950, was mainly spent in the minor leagues. He also played for the Canadian national team at the 1936 Winter Olympics, where he won the silver medal. Haggarty was born in Port Arthur, Ontario. In 1987 he was inducted into the Northwestern Ontario Sports Hall of Fame as a member of that Olympic team.

== Career statistics ==
=== Regular season and playoffs ===
			Regular season					Playoffs
Season	Team	League	GP	G	A	Pts	PIM	GP	G	A	Pts	PIM
1932–33	Port Arthur Ports	TBJHL	12	14	5	19	4	2	0	0	0	0
1932–33	Port Arthur Ports	M-Cup	—	—	—	—	—	4	2	1	3	0
1933–34	Port Arthur Ports	TBJHL	10	6	4	10	9	2	3	0	3	)
1933–34	Port Arthur Ports	M-Cup	—	—	—	—	—	5	10	4	14	2
1934–35	Port Arthur Ports	TBSHL	16	11	2	13	21	3	5	1	6	5
1934–35	Port Arthur Bearcats	Al-Cup	—	—	—	—	—	7	8	1	9	4
1935–36	Wembley Canadians	EHL	—	15	2	17	—	—	—	—	—	—
1936–37	Wembley Monarchs	ENL	40	29	14	43	6	—	—	—	—	—
1937–38	Wembley Monarchs	ENL	—	11	7	18	—	—	—	—	—	—
1938–39	Wembley Monarchs	ENL	—	15	20	35	—	—	—	—	—	—
1939–40	Montreal Royals	QSHL	28	7	8	15	0	4	0	2	2	2
1939–40	Montreal Royals	Al-Cup	—	—	—	—	—	2	1	1	2	0
1940–41	Montreal Royals	QSHL	21	8	10	19	4	9	2	3	5	14
1940–41	Montreal Royals	Al-Cup	—	—	—	—	—	14	7	6	13	8
1941–42	Montreal Canadiens	NHL	5	1	1	2	0	3	2	1	3	0
1941–42	Montreal Royals	QSHL	36	24	14	38	12	—	—	—	—	—
1942–43	Montreal RCAF	QSHL	35	15	17	32	6	12	8	1	9	4
1943–42	Malton RCAF	TNDHL	4	5	2	7	2	2	5	3	8	0
1944–45	Montreal RCAF	QSHL	5	9	11	20	2	—	—	—	—	—
1944–45	Valleyfield Braves	QPHL	9	7	2	9	0	—	—	—	—	—
1945–46	Montreal Royals	QSHL	—	—	—	—	—	3	1	0	1	0
1946–47	Montreal Royals	QSHL	36	15	17	32	8	10	3	0	3	2
1946–47	Montreal Royals	Al-Cup	—	—	—	—	—	6	1	2	3	0
1947–48	Montreal Royals	QSHL	48	20	42	62	12	3	0	0	0	0
1948–49	Montreal Royals	QSHL	29	17	30	47	8	9	1	7	8	0
1949–50	Montreal Royals	QSHL	8	1	6	7	0	—	—	—	—	—
1949–50	Valleyfield Braves	QSHL	24	2	6	8	0	—	—	—	—	—
QSHL totals			270	118	161	279	52	50	15	13	28	22
NHL totals			5	1	1	2	0	3	2	1	3	2

=== International ===
Year	Team	Event	GP	G	A	Pts	PIM
1936	Canada	OLY	2	2	3	5	0
Senior totals			2	2	3	5	0
