= List of NHL players (P) =

This is a list of National Hockey League (NHL) players who have played at least one game in the NHL from 1917 to present and have a last name that starts with "P".

List updated as of the 2018–19 NHL season.

== Pa ==
- Magnus Paajarvi
- Brayden Pachal
- Clayton Pachal
- Max Pacioretty
- Cam Paddock
- John Paddock
- Jim Paek
- Nathan Paetsch
- Jean-Gabriel Pageau
- Paul Pageau
- Samuel Pahlsson
- Rosaire Paiement
- Wilf Paiement
- Daniel Paille
- Marcel Paille
- Iiro Pakarinen
- Pete Palangio
- Ondrej Palat
- Aldo Palazzari
- Doug Palazzari
- Zigmund Palffy
- Michael Paliotta
- Mike Palmateer
- Brad Palmer
- Jarod Palmer
- Rob Palmer (born 1952)
- Rob Palmer (born 1956)
- Kyle Palmieri
- Nick Palmieri
- Aaron Palushaj
- Eddie Panagabko
- Artemi Panarin
- Jay Pandolfo
- Mike Pandolfo
- Darren Pang
- Richard Panik
- Greg Pankewicz
- Grigorijs Pantelejevs
- Joe Papike
- Justin Papineau
- Jim Pappin
- Cedric Paquette
- Bob Paradise
- Colton Parayko
- Adam Pardy
- Bernie Parent
- Bob Parent
- Rich Parent
- Ryan Parent
- P. A. Parenteau
- George Pargeter
- J. P. Parise
- Zach Parise
- Michel Parizeau
- Brad Park
- Richard Park
- Jeff Parker
- Scott Parker
- Ernie Parkes
- Greg Parks
- Mark Parrish
- Dave Parro
- George Parros
- Scott Parse
- George Parsons
- Juuso Parssinen
- Timo Parssinen
- Dusan Pasek
- Dave Pasin
- Greg Paslawski
- Edward Pasquale
- Steve Passmore
- David Pastrnak
- Jiri Patera
- Ondrej Pavel
- Pavel Patera
- Joe Paterson
- Mark Paterson
- Rick Paterson
- Greg Pateryn
- Doug Patey
- Larry Patey
- Craig Patrick
- Glenn Patrick
- James Patrick
- Lester Patrick
- Lynn Patrick
- Murray "Muzz" Patrick
- Nolan Patrick
- Steve Patrick
- Colin Patterson
- Dennis Patterson
- Ed Patterson
- George Patterson
- Dimitri Patzold
- Butch Paul
- Jeff Paul
- Nick Paul
- Roland Paulhus
- Ondrej Pavelec
- Mark Pavelich
- Marty Pavelich
- Joe Pavelski
- Jim Pavese
- Evariste Payer
- Serge Payer
- Adam Payerl
- Davis Payne
- Steve Payne
- Kent Paynter

== Pe ==
- Pat Peake
- Chase Pearson
- Mel Pearson
- Rob Pearson
- Scott Pearson
- Tanner Pearson
- Stephen Peat
- Matthew Peca
- Michael Peca
- Alexander Pechursky
- Theo Peckham
- Andrey Pedan
- Allen Pedersen
- Barry Pederson
- Denis Pederson
- Lane Pederson
- Mark Pederson
- Tom Pederson
- Andrew Peeke
- Bert Peer
- Pete Peeters
- Johnny Peirson
- Adam Pelech
- Matt Pelech
- Perry Pelensky
- Scott Pellerin
- Jakob Pelletier
- Jean-Marc Pelletier
- Marcel Pelletier
- Pascal Pelletier
- Roger Pelletier
- Rod Pelley
- Andre Peloffy
- Derek Peltier
- Ville Peltonen
- Anthony Peluso
- Mike Peluso (born 1965)
- Mike Peluso (born 1974)
- Mike Pelyk
- Dustin Penner
- Jeff Penner
- Chad Penney
- Steve Penney
- Cliff Pennington
- Jim Peplinski
- Nick Perbix
- Stuart Percy
- Yaniv Perets
- Alexander Perezhogin
- Cole Perfetti
- Brendan Perlini
- Fred Perlini
- Joel Perrault
- Bob Perreault
- Fern Perreault
- Gilbert Perreault
- Jacob Perreault
- Mathieu Perreault
- Yanic Perreault
- Eric Perrin
- David Perron
- Nathan Perrott
- Brian Perry
- Corey Perry
- Joel Persson
- John Persson
- Ricard Persson
- Stefan Persson
- Scott Perunovich
- Brett Pesce
- Harri Pesonen
- Janne Pesonen
- George Pesut
- Nic Petan
- JJ Peterka
- Andrew Peters
- Frank Peters
- Garry Peters
- Jimmy Peters, Sr.
- Jimmy Peters, Jr.
- Steve Peters
- Warren Peters
- Cal Petersen
- Toby Petersen
- Brent Peterson (born 1958)
- Brent Peterson (born 1972)
- Jacob Peterson
- Andre Petersson
- Richard Petiot
- Michel Petit
- Nick Petrecki
- Lennart Petrell
- Sergei Petrenko
- Oleg Petrov
- Alex Petrovic
- Robert Petrovicky
- Ronald Petrovicky
- Jakub Petruzalek
- Jeff Petry
- Elias Pettersson
- Jorgen Pettersson
- Marcus Pettersson
- Jim Pettie
- Tomi Pettinen
- Eric Pettinger
- Gordon Pettinger
- Matt Pettinger
- Rich Peverley
- Michael Pezzetta

== Ph–Pi ==
- Lyle Phair
- Dion Phaneuf
- Harold Phillipoff
- Bill "Bat" Phillips
- Charlie "Red" Phillips
- Chris Phillips
- Isaak Phillips
- Merlyn "Bill" Phillips
- Luke Philp
- Alexandre Picard
- Alexandre R. Picard
- Michel Picard
- Noel Picard
- Robert Picard
- Roger Picard
- Dave Pichette
- Calvin Pickard
- Hal Picketts
- Harry Pidhirny
- Timo Pielmeier
- Randy Pierce
- Blake Pietila
- Alex Pietrangelo
- Frank Pietrangelo
- Tuomas Pihlman
- Antti Pihlstrom
- Alf Pike
- Ilkka Pikkarainen
- Karel Pilar
- Rich Pilon
- Pierre Pilote
- Lawrence Pilut
- Gerry Pinder
- Brian Pinho
- Adam Pineault
- Steve Pinizzotto
- Shane Pinto
- Neal Pionk
- Lasse Pirjeta
- Esa Pirnes
- Kamil Piros
- Brandon Pirri
- Alex Pirus
- Ales Pisa
- Fernando Pisani
- Joe Piskula
- Joni Pitkanen
- Lance Pitlick
- Rem Pitlick
- Didier Pitre
- Domenic Pittis
- Libor Pivko
- Michal Pivonka

== Pl ==
- Barclay Plager
- Bill Plager
- Bob Plager
- Gerry Plamondon
- Alex Plante
- Cam Plante
- Dan Plante
- Derek Plante
- Jacques Plante
- Pierre Plante
- Mark Plantery
- Michel Plasse
- Geoff Platt
- Adrien Plavsic
- Hugh Plaxton
- Jim Playfair
- Larry Playfair
- Larry Pleau
- Tomas Plekanec
- Vaclav Pletka
- Charles Pletsch
- Willi Plett
- Tomas Plihal
- Sergei Plotnikov
- Rob Plumb
- Ron Plumb

== Po ==
- Steve Poapst
- Thomas Pock
- Harvie Pocza
- Walt Poddubny
- Shjon Podein
- Vasily Podkolzin
- Andrej Podkonicky
- Ray Podloski
- Jason Podollan
- Nels Podolsky
- Ryan Poehling
- Rudy Poeschek
- Tony Poeta
- Austin Poganski
- Justin Pogge
- John Pohl
- Bud Poile
- Don Poile
- Brayden Point
- Emile Poirier
- Gordon Poirier
- Matthew Poitras
- Roman Polak
- Vojtech Polan
- Tom Polanic
- John Polich
- Mike Polich
- Jason Polin
- Greg Polis
- Dan Poliziani
- Jame Pollock
- Dennis Polonich
- Jason Pominville
- Alexei Ponikarovsky
- Vasili Ponomaryov
- Paul Pooley
- Tucker Poolman
- Larry Popein
- Poul Popiel
- Mark Popovic
- Peter Popovic
- Tomas Popperle
- Chris Porter
- Kevin Porter
- Jack Portland
- Jukka Porvari
- Victor Posa
- Mike Posavad
- Marek Posmyk
- Martin Pospisil
- Paul Postma
- Brian Pothier
- Tom Poti
- Barry Potomski
- Corey Potter
- Ryan Potulny
- Andrew Poturalski
- Denis Potvin
- Felix Potvin
- Jean Potvin
- Marc Potvin
- Daniel Poudrier
- Dan Poulin
- Dave Poulin
- Patrick Poulin
- Samuel Poulin
- Benoit Pouliot
- Derrick Pouliot
- Marc-Antoine Pouliot
- Jaroslav Pouzar
- Darroll Powe
- Ray Powell
- Owen Power
- Geoff Powis
- Lynn Powis

== Pr ==
- Petr Prajsler
- Jack Pratt
- Kelly Pratt
- Nolan Pratt
- Tracy Pratt
- Walter "Babe" Pratt
- Tom Preissing
- Dean Prentice
- Eric "Doc" Prentice
- Wayne Presley
- Rich Preston
- Yves Preston
- Carey Price
- Jack Price
- Noel Price
- Pat Price
- Tom Price
- Ken Priestlay
- Cayden Primeau
- Joe Primeau
- Keith Primeau
- Kevin Primeau
- Wayne Primeau
- Shane Prince
- Ellis Pringle
- David Printz
- Chase Priskie
- Bob Probert
- Martin Prochazka
- George "Goldie" Prodgers
- Nikolai Prokhorkin
- Vitali Prokhorov
- Mike Prokopec
- Chris Pronger
- Sean Pronger
- Andre Pronovost
- Claude Pronovost
- Jean Pronovost
- Marcel Pronovost
- Brian Propp
- Vaclav Prospal
- Ivan Prosvetov
- Aliaksei Protas
- Christian Proulx
- Dalton Prout
- Ivan Provorov
- Claude Provost
- Ethan Prow
- Joel Prpic
- Petr Prucha
- Martin Prusek
- Brandon Prust
- Sergei Pryakhin
- Chris Pryor
- Metro Prystai

== Pu–Py ==
- Albert Pudas
- Matt Puempel
- Bob Pulford
- Jesse Puljujarvi
- David Pulkkinen
- Teemu Pulkkinen
- Ryan Pulock
- Daren Puppa
- Teddy Purcell
- Dale Purinton
- Cliff "Fido" Purpur
- John Purves
- Chris Pusey
- Konstantin Pushkarev
- Jamie Pushor
- Jean Pusie
- Valtteri Puustinen
- Nelson Pyatt
- Taylor Pyatt
- Tom Pyatt
- Mika Pyorala
- Mark Pysyk
- Mikael Pyyhtia

== See also ==
- hockeydb.com NHL Player List - P
