= Bob Whitelaw =

Scottish-born Canadian ice hockey player

- Born: October 5, 1916 Motherwell, Scotland, U.K.
- Died: October 6, 1972 (aged 56)
- Height: 6 ft 0 in (183 cm)
- Weight: 195 lb (88 kg; 13 st 13 lb)
- Position: Defence
- Shot: Left
- Played for: Detroit Red Wings; Harringay Racers; Wembley Lions
- Playing career: 1936–1948

Robert Whitelaw (October 5, 1916 – October 6, 1972) was a Canadian professional ice hockey player who played 32 games in the National Hockey League with the Detroit Red Wings during the 1940–41 and 1941–42 seasons. The rest of his career, which lasted from 1936 to 1948, was mainly spent in the minor leagues. Whitelaw was born in Motherwell, Scotland, United Kingdom and raised in Winnipeg, Manitoba.

== Career statistics ==
=== Regular season and playoffs ===
			Regular season					Playoffs
Season	Team	League	GP	G	A	Pts	PIM	GP	G	A	Pts	PIM
1934–35	Winnipeg Rangers	MJHL	6	0	0	0	6	—	—	—	—	—
1935–36	Winnipeg Rangers	MJHL	12	4	4	8	10	2	3	0	3	6
1936–37	Harringay Racers	ENL	—	5	3	8	10	—	—	—	—	—
1937–38	Harringay Racers	ENL	—	8	4	12	15	—	—	—	—	—
1938–39	Pittsburgh Hornets	IAHL	50	1	7	8	23	—	—	—	—	—
1939–40	Indianapolis Capitals	IAHL	67	6	7	13	22	5	0	0	0	0
1940–41	Detroit Red Wings	NHL	23	0	1	1	2	8	0	0	0	0
1940–41	Indianapolis Capitals	AHL	24	1	4	5	8	—	—	—	—	—
1941–42	Detroit Red Wings	NHL	9	0	0	0	0	—	—	—	—	—
1941–42	Indianapolis Capitals	AHL	9	1	2	3	5	—	—	—	—	—
1941–42	Providence Reds	AHL	19	0	1	1	8	—	—	—	—	—
1942–43	Providence Reds	AHL	55	7	15	22	27	2	0	0	0	0
1944–45	Winnipeg RCAF	WNDHL	11	1	2	3	6	—	—	—	—	—
1946–47	Wembley Lions	EHL	—	—	—	—	—	—	—	—	—	—
1946–47	Providence Reds	AHL	60	2	6	8	7	—	—	—	—	—
1947–48	Winnipeg Nationals	WSRHL	7	1	1	2	0	—	—	—	—	—
IAHL/AHL totals			284	18	42	60	100	7	0	0	0	0
NHL totals			32	0	1	1	2	8	0	0	0	0

== See also ==
- List of National Hockey League players from the United Kingdom
