= Tony Licari =

Canadian ice hockey player

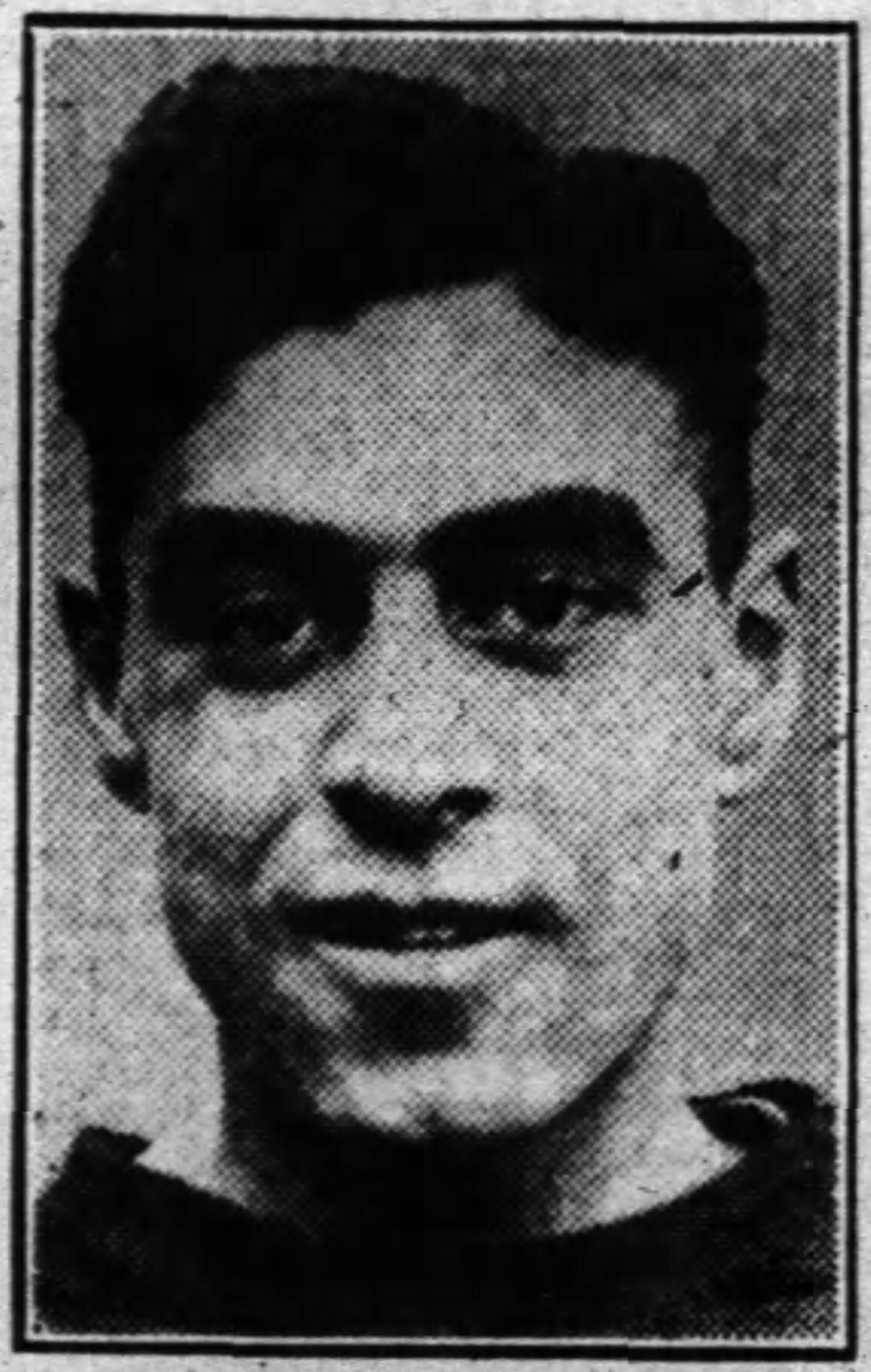
- Licari pictured in a 1940 newspaper
- Born: April 9, 1921 Ottawa, Ontario, Canada
- Died: July 4, 2013 (aged 92) Ottawa, Ontario, Canada
- Height: 5 ft 7 in (170 cm)
- Weight: 154 lb (70 kg; 11 st 0 lb)
- Position: Right wing
- Shot: Right
- Played for: Detroit Red Wings; Harringay Racers
- Playing career: 1941–1955

Anthony Licari (April 9, 1921 – July 4, 2013) was a Canadian professional ice hockey player. He played nine games in the National Hockey League (NHL) with the Detroit Red Wings during the 1946–47 season. The rest of his career lasted from 1941 to 1955 and was mainly spent in various minor leagues.

== Playing career ==
Born in Ottawa, Licari played high school hockey for Ottawa Technical School before joining the Perth Blue Wings junior team of the Ottawa City Hockey League. In 1940, he joined the Guelph Biltmores of the Ontario Hockey Association for one season. Licari turned professional in 1941 with the Dallas Texans of the American Hockey Association. World War II interrupted his professional career and he enlisted in the RCAF. While in the RCAF, he was able to continue playing senior hockey, playing for the Ottawa RCAF, Vancouver RCAF, and Ottawa Equipment Depot teams.

After the war, he played exhibition matches with the Wembley Lions in England. In 1946, Licari joined the Indianapolis Capitals of the American Hockey League (AHL). His play earned him a call-up to the NHL Red Wings where he played for nine games, scoring one assist. After the nine games, Licari returned to the minors. After two further seasons with Indianapolis, he was traded by Detroit to Chicago, where he played with their AHL affiliate St. Louis Flyers for one season in 1948–49. He left the AHL ranks and returned to senior hockey with the Ottawa RCAF Flyers for two seasons. He also played with the Ottawa Senators of the Quebec Senior Hockey League (QSHL) in 1950.

In 1951, he moved to England to join the Harringay Racers where he played professionally for three seasons. Licari was a member of the Racers' Autumn Cup winners in 1952. He returned to Canada and played one more season of senior hockey for the Pembroke Lumber Kings of the Northern Ontario Hockey Association before hanging them up.

Licari died on July 4, 2013, at a hospital in Ottawa.

== Career statistics ==
=== Regular season and playoffs ===
			Regular season					Playoffs
Season	Team	League	GP	G	A	Pts	PIM	GP	G	A	Pts	PIM
1938–39	Glebe Collegiate	HS-CA	—	—	—	—	—	—	—	—	—	—
1939–40	Perth Blue Wings	OVHL	9	13	12	25	0	4	6	6	12	4
1939–40	Perth Blue Wings	M-Cup	—	—	—	—	—	8	9	6	15	2
1940–41	Guelph Biltmores	OHA	12	10	16	26	4	5	8	4	12	2
1941–42	Dallas Texans	AHA	49	15	18	33	10	—	—	—	—	—
1942–43	Ottawa RCAF Flyers	OCHL	19	19	17	36	0	8	6	6	12	4
1942–43	Ottawa RCAF Flyers	Al-Cup	—	—	—	—	—	7	5	5	10	0
1943–44	Vancouver RCAF	NNDHL	14	16	7	23	9	3	4	1	5	0
1944–45	Ottawa Depot #17	OCHL	7	13	22	35	2	—	—	—	—	—
1946–47	Detroit Red Wings	NHL	9	0	1	1	0	—	—	—	—	—
1946–47	Indianapolis Capitals	AHL	52	21	28	49	6	—	—	—	—	—
1947–48	Indianapolis Capitals	AHL	65	20	39	59	10	—	—	—	—	—
1948–49	St. Louis Flyers	AHL	68	22	52	74	8	7	1	4	5	2
1949–50	Ottawa RCAF Flyers	OCHL	40	28	29	57	22	5	4	3	7	4
1950–51	Ottawa Senators	QSHL	2	1	0	1	0	—	—	—	—	—
1950–51	Ottawa RCAF Flyers	OCHL	40	23	28	51	14	7	9	5	14	6
1951–52	Harringay Racers	ENL	30	15	28	43	20	—	—	—	—	—
1952–53	Harringay Racers	ENL	21	20	26	46	6	—	—	—	—	—
1953–54	Harringay Racers	ENL	24	17	31	48	16	—	—	—	—	—
1954–55	Pembroke Lumber Kings	NOHA	1	0	0	0	0	—	—	—	—	—
AHL totals			185	63	119	182	24	7	1	4	5	2
NHL totals			9	0	1	1	0	—	—	—	—	—
