= Don Willson =

Canadian ice hockey player

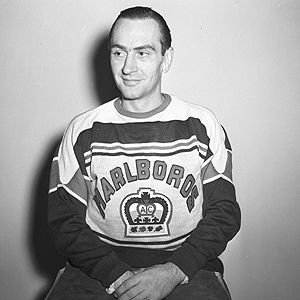
- Born: January 13, 1913; Chatham, Ontario, Canada
- Died: March 23, 1967 (aged 54); Toronto, Ontario, Canada
- Height: 5 ft 8 in (173 cm)
- Weight: 157 lb (71 kg; 11 st 3 lb)
- Position: Centre
- Shot: Left
- Played for: Montreal Canadiens; Earls Court Rangers
- Playing career: 1935–1948

Donald Walter Willson (January 13, 1913 – March 23, 1967) was a Canadian professional ice hockey forward. He played 22 games in the National Hockey League for the Montreal Canadiens during the 1937–38 and 1938–39 seasons. The rest of his career, which lasted from 1935 to 1948, was mainly spent in the minor leagues.

== Biography ==
Willson was born in Chatham, Ontario, but grew up in Bradford, Ontario. In 1929 he joined the junior hockey team the Newmarket Redmen, and played with them in the Memorial Cup four times, winning in 1933. He moved on to the Toronto St. Michael's Majors in 1933 and was a member of the 1934 Memorial Cup-winning team.

In 1934, Willson entered senior hockey with the Oshawa Chevies for a season, then moved to England to play in the English National League with the Earls Court Rangers for two seasons.

Willson returned to North America for the 1937–38 season, when Willson played for the Verdun Maple Leafs and 18 games for the Montreal Canadiens. Willson played a further four games for the Canadiens in the 1938–39 season. Willson played the rest of the season for the New Haven Eagles and a further three seasons for the Eagles before Willson enlisted in the Royal Canadian Air Force for wartime service.

Willson returned after World War II and played four seasons of organized senior ice hockey before retiring in 1949. Willson died at a Toronto hospital in 1967 at the age of 54.

== Career statistics ==
=== Regular season and playoffs ===
			Regular season					Playoffs
Season	Team	League	GP	G	A	Pts	PIM	GP	G	A	Pts	PIM
1931–32	Newmarket Royals	Exhib	7	6	0	6	2	—	—	—	—	—
1931–32	Newmarket Redmen	M-Cup	—	—	—	—	—	6	11	1	12	—
1932–33	Newmarket Royals	Exhib	17	15	5	20	—	—	—	—	—	—
1932–33	Newmarket Redmen	M-Cup	—	—	—	—	—	19	7	2	9	10
1933–34	St. Michael's Majors	OHA	8	9	9	18	0	3	1	1	2	0
1933–34	St. Michael's Majors	M-Cup	—	—	—	—	—	11	7	12	19	8
1934–35	Oshawa Chevies	OHA	15	10	6	16	8	—	—	—	—	—
1935–36	Earls Court Rangers	ENL	—	22	16	38	—	—	—	—	—	—
1936–37	Earls Court Rangers	ENL	38	37	28	65	16	—	—	—	—	—
1937–38	Montreal Canadiens	NHL	18	2	7	9	0	3	0	0	0	0
1937–38	Verdun Maple Leafs	QSHL	14	9	13	22	2	—	—	—	—	—
1938–39	Montreal Canadiens	NHL	4	0	0	0	0	—	—	—	—	—
1938–39	New Haven Eagles	IAHL	42	10	10	20	2	—	—	—	—	—
1939–40	New Haven Eagles	IAHL	54	12	32	44	6	3	0	3	3	—
1940–41	New Haven Eagles	AHL	49	11	19	30	6	—	—	—	—	—
1941–42	New Haven Eagles	AHL	53	16	24	40	10	2	0	1	1	0
1942–43	Toronto RCAF	OHA Sr	9	7	9	16	2	2	1	0	1	2
1945–46	Toronto Staffords	OHA Sr	16	18	9	27	4	10	6	10	16	0
1946–47	Toronto Staffords	OHA Sr	24	2	5	7	20	5	1	2	3	2
1947–48	Toronto Marlboros	OHA Sr	11	0	2	2	5	—	—	—	—	—
IAHL/AHL totals			198	49	85	134	24	2	0	1	1	0
NHL totals			22	2	7	9	0	3	0	0	0	0
