= Hazen McAndrew =

Canadian ice hockey player

- Born: August 7, 1917; Mayo, Quebec, Canada
- Died: August 27, 1993 (aged 76)
- Height: 5 ft 10 in (178 cm)
- Weight: 189 lb (86 kg; 13 st 7 lb)
- Position: Defence
- Shot: Left
- Played for: Brooklyn Americans
- Playing career: 1939–1950

Bernard Hazen McAndrew (August 7, 1917 — August 27, 1993) was a Canadian ice hockey player who played seven games in the National Hockey League for the Brooklyn Americans during the 1941–42 season. The rest of his career, which lasted from 1939 to 1950, was spent in different minor leagues.

== Career statistics ==
=== Regular season and playoffs ===
			Regular season					Playoffs
Season	Team	League	GP	G	A	Pts	PIM	GP	G	A	Pts	PIM
1935–36	Niagara Falls Cataracts	OHA Sr	8	5	2	7	24	2	0	0	0	4
1935–36	Niagara Falls Cataracts	Al-Cup	—	—	—	—	—	2	0	0	0	2
1936–37	Toronto British Consols	OHA-B	12	8	1	9	36	6	3	0	3	14
1936–37	Niagara Falls Cataracts	OHA Sr	—	—	—	—	—	4	0	0	0	2
1937–38	Harringay Greyhounds	GBR	—	1	1	2	—	—	—	—	—	—
1937–38	Harringay Greyhounds	Nat-Tmt	—	1	0	1	—	—	—	—	—	—
1938–39	Ottawa Senators	QSHL	9	0	0	0	10	—	—	—	—	—
1938–39	Harringay Greyhounds	Ln-Cup	—	0	1	1	—	—	—	—	—	—
1938–39	Harringay Greyhounds	GBR	—	4	3	7	—	—	—	—	—	—
1938–39	Harringay Grehounds	Ntl-Tmt	—	1	1	2	—	—	—	—	—	—
1939–40	Niagara Falls Cataracts	OHA Sr	3	1	1	2	4	—	—	—	—	—
1939–40	Atlantic City Seagulls	EAHL	34	10	9	19	26	3	2	0	2	6
1940–41	Niagara Falls Brights	OHA Sr	28	2	3	5	78	3	0	1	1	0
1940–41	Springfield Indians	AHL	7	1	3	4	21	3	0	0	0	6
1941–42	Brooklyn Americans	NHL	7	0	1	1	6	—	—	—	—	—
1941–42	Hershey Bears	AHL	3	1	0	1	2	—	—	—	—	—
1941–42	Philadelphia Ramblers	AHL	15	1	3	4	20	—	—	—	—	—
1941–42	Port Colborne Sailors	OHA Sr	2	0	0	0	0	—	—	—	—	—
1941–42	Springfield Indians	AHL	30	1	4	5	32	5	0	1	1	9
1942–43	Niagara Falls Cataracts	OHA Sr	24	9	10	19	80	2	0	0	0	6
1946–47	Springfield Indians	AHL	63	2	8	10	94	2	0	0	0	2
1946–47	Owen Sound Mohawks	OHA Sr	3	0	1	1	6	—	—	—	—	—
1948–49	Springfield Indians	AHL	63	3	8	11	70	3	0	0	0	0
1949–50	Vancouver Canucks	PCHL	63	1	14	15	67	3	0	0	0	16
AHL totals			181	9	26	35	239	13	0	1	1	17
NHL totals			7	0	1	1	6	—	—	—	—	—
