= Des Smith (ice hockey) =

Canadian ice hockey player

- Born: February 22, 1914 Ottawa, Ontario, Canada
- Died: September 26, 1981 (aged 67) Ottawa, Ontario, Canada
- Height: 6 ft 0 in (183 cm)
- Weight: 185 lb (84 kg; 13 st 3 lb)
- Position: Defence
- Shot: Left
- Played for: Wembley Lions; Wembley Monarchs; Montreal Maroons; Montreal Canadiens; Chicago Black Hawks; Boston Bruins
- Playing career: 1935–1946

Desmond Patrick Smith (February 22, 1914 – September 26, 1981) was a Canadian ice hockey defenceman who played for four teams in the National Hockey League (NHL) between 1937 and 1942. He won the Stanley Cup with the Boston Bruins in 1941. His sons Brian and Gary also played in the NHL.

== Playing career ==
=== Pre-NHL career ===
Des Smith began his hockey career in his hometown playing for the Ottawa Montagnards from 1932–34. He would later play for the Charlottetown Abbies of the Maritime Senior Hockey League and the Saint John St. Peters of the Saint John City Hockey League. In 1935–36 he moved to England to play for the Wembley Lions where he won the English National League championship. He spent the 1936–37 season with the Wembley Monarchs.

=== NHL ===
He moved back to Canada after the 1937 season. He was signed as a free agent by the Montreal Maroons on October 7, 1937. After one season with the Maroons he was traded for cash to the Montreal Canadiens on September 14, 1938. He again would play just one season on the other side of town. He was again traded for cash this time to the Chicago Black Hawks on May 15, 1939. He played the 1938–39 season in the International American Hockey League with the New Haven Eagles. He joined Chicago in 1940. He played there for one season before being traded to the Boston Bruins for Jack Portland on January 27, 1940. He found his greatest success in Boston playing with Hall of Famers like Bobby Bauer, Milt Schmidt, and Roy Conacher. He helped the Bruins win the Stanley Cup in 1941 defeating the Detroit Red Wings in four straight games. He played one more season in Boston before retiring from the NHL.

=== Post-NHL ===
Des Smith returned to Ottawa where he took up a position coaching the Ottawa Army Team. He coached there for two seasons. He came back to the ice as a player with the Montreal Army Team in 1944–45. He played his last games with the Springfield Indians of the AHL in 1947.

He later became a referee in the AHL for several years.

After his various hockey careers ended he became the announcer at the Rideau-Carleton Raceway in Ottawa in 1962. He also served as the public relations director until his death in 1981. Des was inducted into the Ottawa Sports Hall of Fame in 1985 and onto the Rideau Carleton's Wall of Fame in 1989. The annual Des Smith Classic is held every September at the track.

== Career statistics ==
=== Regular season and playoffs ===
			Regular season					Playoffs
Season	Team	League	GP	G	A	Pts	PIM	GP	G	A	Pts	PIM
1930–31	Ottawa St. Malachy's	OCHL	13	1	0	1	32	—	—	—	—	—
1931–32	Ottawa Montagnards	OCHL	1	0	0	0	0	—	—	—	—	—
1931–32	Ottawa Jr. Montagnards	OCJHL	12	2	4	6	18	2	0	0	0	11
1932–33	Ottawa Montagnards	OCHL	1	0	0	0	0	1	0	0	0	0
1932–33	Ottawa Jr. Montagnards	OCJHL	15	3	5	8	25	2	0	0	0	4
1933–34	Ottawa Montagnards	OCHL	21	6	5	11	37	3	0	1	1	4
1934–35	Charlottetown Abbies	MSHL	19	0	2	2	54	—	—	—	—	—
1934–35	Saint John St. Peters	SJCHL	14	6	15	21	19	12	4	1	5	21
1935–36	Wembley Lions	ENL	—	7	4	11	—	—	—	—	—	—
1936–37	Wembley Monarchs	ENL	34	8	8	16	40	—	—	—	—	—
1937–38	Montreal Maroons	NHL	40	3	1	4	47	—	—	—	—	—
1938–39	Montreal Canadiens	NHL	16	3	3	6	8	3	0	0	0	4
1938–39	New Haven Eagles	IAHL	34	4	9	13	34	—	—	—	—	—
1939–40	Chicago Black Hawks	NHL	26	1	4	5	27	—	—	—	—	—
1939–40	Boston Bruins	NHL	17	2	2	4	23	6	0	0	0	0
1940–41	Boston Bruins	NHL	48	6	8	14	61	11	0	2	2	12
1941–42	Boston Bruins	NHL	48	7	8	15	80	5	1	2	3	2
1942–43	Ottawa Army	OCHL	—	—	—	—	—	—	—	—	—	—
1943–44	Ottawa Army	OCHL	—	—	—	—	—	—	—	—	—	—
1944–45	Montreal Army	CHL	10	6	2	8	10	3	0	1	1	4
1945–46	Shawinigan Falls Cataractes	QSHL	14	0	3	3	12	—	—	—	—	—
1946–47	Springfield Indians	AHL	2	1	0	1	0	—	—	—	—	—
NHL totals			195	22	26	48	246	25	1	4	5	18
