= Archie Fraser (ice hockey) =

Canadian ice hockey player

- Born: February 9, 1914; Souris, Manitoba, Canada
- Died: August 2, 1993 (aged 79)
- Height: 5 ft 11 in (180 cm)
- Weight: 160 lb (73 kg; 11 st 6 lb)
- Position: Centre
- Shot: Left
- Played for: New York Rangers; Wembley Monarchs
- Playing career: 1933–1952

Archibald McKay "Archie" Fraser (February 9, 1914 – August 2, 1993) was a Canadian ice hockey player who played three games in the National Hockey League with the New York Rangers during the 1943–44 season. The rest of his career, which lasted from 1933 to 1952, was mainly spent in senior leagues. He was born in Souris, Manitoba, and was the brother of Harvey Fraser.

== Career statistics ==
=== Regular season and playoffs ===
			Regular season					Playoffs
Season	Team	League	GP	G	A	Pts	PIM	GP	G	A	Pts	PIM
1932–33	Yorkton Terriers	S-SJHL	—	—	—	—	—	—	—	—	—	—
1932–33	Yorkton Terriers	M-Cup	—	—	—	—	—	2	0	0	0	0
1933–34	Yorkton Terriers	S-SSHL	—	—	—	—	—	—	—	—	—	—
1934–35	Yorkton Terriers	Exhib	—	—	—	—	—	—	—	—	—	—
1934–35	Yorkton Terriers	Al-Cup	—	—	—	—	—	1	0	0	0	)
1935–36	Yorkton Terriers	S-SSHL	17	5	7	12	4	3	0	1	1	4
1936–37	Yorkton Terriers	S-SSHL	24	14	11	25	20	7	1	4	5	6
1937–38	Yorkton Terriers	S-SSHL	24	25	12	37	14	5	3	2	5	0
1938–39	Wembley Monarchs	ENL	—	13	11	24	—	—	11	3	14	—
1939–40	Yorkton Terriers	SSHL	27	20	20	40	6	5	3	0	3	8
1940–41	Yorkton Terriers	SSHL	31	18	19	37	8	8	3	5	8	2
1941–42	Yorkton Terriers	SSHL	32	17	17	34	10	—	—	—	—	—
1942–43	Yorkton Wings	SSHL	24	11	9	20	10	—	—	—	—	—
1943–44	New York Rangers	NHL	3	0	1	1	0	—	—	—	—	—
1943–44	Moose Jaw Victorias	SSHL	1	2	2	4	0	—	—	—	—	—
1946–47	Yorkton Legionnaires	SIHA	12	7	7	14	12	5	1	2	3	0
1947–48	Tacoma Rockets	PCHL	10	1	1	2	2	—	—	—	—	—
1947–48	Yorkton Legionnaires	SIHA	5	2	6	8	2	4	0	0	0	4
1948–49	Yorkton Legionnaires	SIHA	22	12	16	28	0	—	—	—	—	—
1949–50	Yorkton Legionnaires	SIHA	24	12	18	30	8	8	4	6	10	11
1950–51	Yorkton Legionnaires	S-SSHL	2	1	1	2	0	5	6	3	9	2
1950–51	Yorkton Legionnaires	Al-Cup	—	—	—	—	—	4	0	3	3	2
1951–52	Yorkton Legionnaires	S-SSHL	2	0	0	0	0	—	—	—	—	—
SSHL totals			115	68	67	135	34	13	6	5	11	10
NHL totals			3	0	1	1	0	—	—	—	—	—
