= 1993 Memorial Cup =

Canadian junior men's ice hockey championship

Tournament details
- Venue(s): Sault Memorial Gardens; Sault Ste. Marie, Ontario
- Dates: May 15–23, 1993
- Teams: 4
- Host team: Sault Ste. Marie Greyhounds (OHL)
- TV partner: TSN

Final positions
- Champions: Sault Ste. Marie Greyhounds (OHL) (1st title)

Tournament statistics
- Games played: 8

The Memorial Cup trophy

The 1993 Memorial Cup took place 15–23 May 1993, at the Sault Memorial Gardens in Sault Ste. Marie, Ontario. It was the 75th annual Memorial Cup competition and determined the major junior ice hockey champion of the Canadian Hockey League (CHL).

Sault Ste. Marie won their first Memorial Cup, defeating Peterborough in the championship game.

== Teams ==
QMJHL Team OHL Team WHL Team Host Team

=== Laval Titan ===
The Laval Titan represented the Quebec Major Junior Hockey League at the 1993 Memorial Cup. The Titan finished the 1992–93 season with a 43-25-2 record, earning 88 points, and finishing in first place in the Lebel Division. Laval was the highest scoring team in the league during the regular season, scoring 367 goals. Defensively, the Titan allowed 277 goals against, ranking them third in the twelve team league. In the QMJHL quarter-finals, the Titan swept the Verdun Collège Français in four games to advance to the next round. In the league semi-finals, the Titan stayed red hot, as they swept the Drummondville Voltigeurs in four games, advancing to the President's Cup. In the final round, Laval defeated the top ranked club of the regular season, the Sherbrooke Faucons in five games, to win the QMJHL championship and earn a berth into the 1993 Memorial Cup.

The Titan were led offensively by Eric Veilleux, who led the club with 55 goals and 125 points in 70 games, finishing sixth in QMJHL league scoring. Laval received a boost when the Detroit Red Wings returned top prospect Martin Lapointe to the team midway through the season. In 35 games with the Titan, Lapointe scored 38 goals and 89 points. Lapointe led the club in post-season scoring with 13 goals and 30 points in 13 games. Lapointe would win the Paul Dumont Trophy, awarded to the QMJHL Personality of the Year. Yanick Dube had a strong season for the Titan, scoring 45 goals and 83 points in 68 games. Defensively, the club was led by Benoit Larose, as in 63 games, he scored 16 goals and 78 points. Larose was awarded the Emile Bouchard Trophy, awarded to the QMJHL Defenceman of the Year. In goal, Manny Fernandez saw the bulk of action, earning a 26-14-2 record with a 3.61 GAA and a .885 save percentage. In the post-season, Fernandez posted a record of 12-1 with a 3.08 GAA and a .909 save percentage, as he won the Guy Lafleur Trophy as QMJHL Playoff MVP.

The 1993 Memorial Cup was the fourth appearance by Laval at the tournament in team history. In their previous trip at the 1990 Memorial Cup, the Titan finished in third place. In their other appearances in 1984 and 1989, the Titan finished in fourth place.

=== Peterborough Petes ===
The Peterborough Petes represented the Ontario Hockey League at the 1993 Memorial Cup. The Petes finished as the top club in the OHL during the 1992–93 season, earning a record of 46-15-5 for 97 points and winning the Hamilton Spectator Trophy. Peterborough led the league in goals scored with 352, while they were also the top defensive club in the OHL, allowing a league-low 239 goals. In the first round of the playoffs, the Petes faced off against the top team in the Emms Division, the Sault Ste. Marie Greyhounds, for the right to host the 1993 Memorial Cup. The Greyhounds swept Peterborough in four games, as Sault Ste. Marie was named the host of the tournament. Despite the series loss, the Petes were not eliminated from the post-season. In their next round, the Leyden Division semi-finals, the Petes narrowly defeated the Sudbury Wolves in seven games. In the Leyden Division finals, Peterborough began to find their stride, as they defeated the Kingston Frontenacs in five games, advancing to the J. Ross Robertson Cup finals. In the championship round, the Petes had a rematch against the Sault Ste. Marie Greyhounds, and Peterborough was able to get revenge, as they defeated the Greyhounds four games to one, to win the OHL title and earn a berth into the 1993 Memorial Cup.

The Petes high powered offense was led by Mike Harding, who scored 54 goals and 136 points in 66 games, finishing tied for fourth in the OHL scoring race. Buffalo Sabres prospect Jason Dawe scored a team high 58 goals, as he earned 126 points in 59 games. In the post-season, Dawe led the Petes with 18 goals and 51 points in 21 games. David Roche, a Pittsburgh Penguins prospect, scored 40 goals and 100 points in 56 games, giving Peterborough three 100+ point players. Defensively, the blue line was anchored by top prospect Chris Pronger, who in 61 games, scored 15 goals and 77 points, winning the Max Kaminsky Trophy as the OHL's Most Outstanding Defenceman. In the post-season, Pronger scored 15 goals and 40 points in 21 games. Following the season, Pronger was selected by the Hartford Whalers with the second overall selection at the 1993 NHL entry draft. Chad Lang got the majority of playing time in goal for the Petes, as he earned a 32-6-4 record with a 3.29 GAA and a .890 save percentage in 43 games. Both he and backup goaltender, Ryan Douglas, were awarded the Dave Pinkney Trophy as the Goaltenders on the Team that Allowed the Fewest Goals.

The 1993 Memorial Cup was the seventh time in club history that the Petes qualified for a chance to win the title. In their previous appearance at the 1989 Memorial Cup, Peterborough finished in third place. Peterborough had previously won the Memorial Cup once in team history, as they defeated the Brandon Wheat Kings in the final game at the 1979 Memorial Cup. The Petes had also been finalists at the 1980, 1978, 1972 and 1959 tournaments.

=== Sault Ste. Marie Greyhounds ===
The Sault Ste. Marie Greyhounds represented the Ontario Hockey League as the host team at the 1993 Memorial Cup. This marked the Greyhounds third consecutive appearance at the tournament. The Greyhounds finished in first place in the Emms Division during the 1992–93 season, earning a 38-23-5 record, accumulating 81 points. Sault Ste. Marie was a high scoring team, as they scored 334 goals, ranking them third in the OHL. Defensively, the Greyhounds allowed 260 goals, which was the second fewest in the league. In the first round of the post-season, the Greyhounds faced off against the top team in the Leyden Division, the Peterborough Petes, in a best-of-seven series to determine which city would host the Memorial Cup. The Greyhounds swept the Petes in four games, which earned the club a berth into the 1993 Memorial Cup as the host team. In the following round of the playoffs, the Emms Division semi-finals, the Greyhounds swept the Owen Sound Platers in four games, advancing to the division finals. In the Emms Division final, the Greyhounds knocked off the Detroit Junior Red Wings four games to one, advancing to the J. Ross Robertson Cup finals. In the final round, Sault Ste. Marie had a rematch against the Peterborough Petes, however, the Petes defeated the Greyhounds four games to one in this series to win the OHL championship.

The Greyhounds offense was led by Jarrett Reid, as he scored 36 goals and 96 points in 64 games to lead the club in scoring. In the post-season, Reid scored a team leading 19 goals and 35 points in 18 games. Aaron Gavey scored a team high 45 goals, while earning 84 points, in 62 games during the regular season. Ralph Intranuovo scored 36 goals and 78 points in 54 games, followed by 10 goals and 26 points in 18 post-season games. Chad Penney was acquired by the Greyhounds from the North Bay Centennials in an early season trade. In 48 games with Sault Ste. Marie, Penney scored 29 goals and 73 points. The Greyhounds defense was led by Wade Gibson, also acquired by the Greyhounds from the North Bay Centennials in the same trade that Penney was acquired, as in 48 games, Gibson scored 13 goals and 37 points. Tampa Bay Lightning prospect Drew Bannister was solid, scoring five goals and 33 points in 59 games from the Greyhounds blue line. In goal, Kevin Hodson emerged as the starting goaltender after returning to the club, as he began the season with the Indianapolis Ice of the IHL. In 26 games, Hodson earned a 18-5-2 record with a 3.10 GAA and a .896 save percentage. Dan Tanevski began the season as the Greyhounds starting goaltender, however, after Hodson's return, he was relegated to backup duties. In 32 games, Tanevski posted a 14-10-2 record with a 4.29 GAA and a .855 save percentage.

The 1993 Memorial Cup was the Greyhounds third consecutive appearance at the tournament, and fourth overall in team history. At the 1992 Memorial Cup, the Greyhounds lost to the Kamloops Blazers 5-4 in the final game. The club finished a disappointing fourth at the 1991 Memorial Cup, and at the 1985 Memorial Cup, Sault Ste. Marie finished in third place.

=== Swift Current Broncos ===
The Swift Current Broncos represented the Western Hockey League at the 1993 Memorial Cup. The Broncos were the top team during the 1992–93 season, finishing with a league best record of 49-21-2, earning 100 points, as they won the Scotty Munro Memorial Trophy. Swift Current was a very high scoring club, scoring a WHL high 384 goals, while defensively, the Broncos allowed 267 goals, ranking them sixth in the sixteen team league. The Broncos earned a first round bye in the playoffs, advancing straight to the East Division semi-finals, where they matched up against the Medicine Hat Tigers. Swift Current defeated the Tigers four games to two, advancing to the division finals. In the East Division finals, the Broncos swept the Regina Pats in four games, earning a spot in the President's Cup finals. In the WHL championship round, the Broncos faced off against the top team in the West Division, the Portland Winter Hawks. Swift Current won a thrilling seven game series over Portland to win the championship and earn a berth into the 1993 Memorial Cup.

Swift Current's offense was powered by Jason Krywulak, who scored 81 goals and 162 points in 72 games, as he won the Bob Clarke Trophy as the highest scorer in the WHL. In the playoffs, Krywulak led the club with 15 goals in 17 games. Krywulak was named the winner of the Four Broncos Memorial Trophy as the WHL's Most Valuable Player. Rick Girard scored 71 goals and 141 points in 72 games during the regular season, finishing third in the WHL scoring race. Girard was named the winner of the Brad Hornung Trophy as the WHL's Most Sportsmanlike Player. Following the season, Girard would be drafted by the Vancouver Canucks in the second round of the 1993 NHL entry draft. Todd Holt scored 56 goals and 113 points in 67 games for the club, giving Swift Current three 50+ goal, 100+ scorers on the team. Andy Schneider returned to Swift Current after beginning the season with the New Haven Senators of the American Hockey League. In 38 games, Schneider scored 19 goals and 85 points. In the post-season, Schneider led the Broncos with 39 points in 17 games, and won the airBC Trophy as the WHL's Playoff Most Valuable Player. The Broncos received Tyler Wright back after he began the season with the Edmonton Oilers of the National Hockey League. In 37 games, Wright scored 21 goals and 65 points. Swift Current acquired Chicago Blackhawks prospect Dean McAmmond in a late season trade with the Prince Albert Raiders. In 18 games with Swift Current, McAmmond scored 10 goals and 23 points. In the post-season, McAmmond finished second on the club with 16 goals and 35 points in 17 games. On defense, Montreal Canadiens prospect Brent Bilodeau led the club, as in 59 games, he scored 11 goals and 68 points. In goal, Milan Hnilicka received a majority of the playing time, as he posted a 46-12-2 record with a 3.36 GAA in 65 games.

The 1993 Memorial Cup was the third time in club history that the Broncos qualified for the tournament. At the 1989 Memorial Cup, Swift Current defeated the Saskatoon Blades 4-3 in overtime to clinch the Memorial Cup. At the 1983 Memorial Cup, the franchise was known as the Lethbridge Broncos, and they finished in fourth place at the tournament.

== Round-robin standings ==
Pos	Team	Pld	W	L	GF	GA	
1	Sault Ste. Marie Greyhounds (Host)	3	2	1	13	10	Advanced directly to the championship game
2	Peterborough Petes (OHL)	3	2	1	16	14	Advanced to the semifinal game
3	Laval Titan (QMJHL)	3	1	2	10	12	Advanced to the tiebreaker
4	Swift Current Broncos (WHL)	3	1	2	11	14	Advanced to the tiebreaker

== Scores ==
Round-robin

- May 15 Sault Ste. Marie 3-2 Laval
- May 16 Peterborough 6-4 Laval
- May 16 Swift Current 5-3 Sault Ste. Marie
- May 18 Peterborough 7-3 Swift Current
- May 19 Laval 4-3 Swift Current
- May 20 Sault Ste. Marie 7-3 Peterborough

Tie-breaker

- May 21 Laval 4-3 Swift Current

Semi-final

- May 22 Peterborough 3-1 Laval

Final

- May 23 Sault Ste. Marie 4-2 Peterborough

=== Winning roster ===
1992-93 Sault Ste. Marie Greyhounds
Goaltenders: – Dan Cloutier; – Kevin Hodson	Defencemen: – Drew Bannister; – Sean Gagnon; – Wade Gibson; – Neal Martin; – Mark Matier; – Oliver Pastinsky; – Gary Roach; – Briane Thompson	Wingers: – Brad Baber; – Kiley Hill; – Ralph Intranuovo; – Rick Kowalsky - C; – David Matsos; – Jodi Murphy; – Perry Pappas; – Chad Penney; – Steve Sullivan; – Joe Van Volson	Centres: – Aaron Gavey; – Tom MacDonald; – Jarret Reid; – Jeff Toms; Coach: Ted Nolan; General Manager: Sherwood Bassin

== Award winners ==
- Stafford Smythe Memorial Trophy (MVP): Ralph Intranuovo, Sault Ste. Marie
- George Parsons Trophy (Sportsmanship): Jason Dawe, Peterborough
- Hap Emms Memorial Trophy (Goaltender): Kevin Hodson, Sault Ste. Marie

All-star team

- Goal: Kevin Hodson, Sault Ste. Marie
- Defence: Michael Gaul, Laval; Drew Bannister, Sault Ste. Marie
- Centre: Ralph Intranuovo, Sault Ste. Marie
- Left wing: Chad Penney, Sault Ste. Marie
- Right wing: Martin Lapointe, Laval
