= Bert Peer =

Canadian ice hockey player

- Born: November 12, 1910 Port Credit, Ontario, Canada
- Died: July 19, 1992 (aged 81) Mississauga, Ontario, Canada
- Height: 5 ft 11 in (180 cm)
- Weight: 175 lb (79 kg; 12 st 7 lb)
- Position: Right wing
- Shot: Right
- Played for: Detroit Red Wings; Harringay Racers
- Playing career: 1932–1948

Herbert John Peer (November 12, 1910 – July 19, 1992) was a Canadian professional ice hockey right winger who played in one National Hockey League game for the Detroit Red Wings during the 1939–40 season, on March 15, 1940 against the Chicago Black Hawks. The rest of his career, which lasted from 1932 to 1948, was spent in various minor leagues, as well as two seasons in the English National League. Peer joined the British Ice Hockey Hall of Fame in 1955.

== Career statistics ==
=== Regular season and playoffs ===
			Regular season					Playoffs
Season	Team	League	GP	G	A	Pts	PIM	GP	G	A	Pts	PIM
1932–33	Toronto Bell Telephone	TMHL	11	4	1	5	10	4	1	1	2	4
1933–34	Toronto Bell Telephone	TMHL	—	—	—	—	—	—	—	—	—	—
1934–35	Toronto British Consols	TIHL	12	7	3	10	2	4	2	0	2	6
1934–35	Oakville Villans	OHA Sr	14	9	3	12	20	2	0	2	2	0
1935–36	Oakville Villans	OHA Sr	15	10	4	14	15	2	1	0	1	2
1935–36	Toronto British Consols	TMHL	14	11	3	14	19	5	0	1	1	26
1936–37	Harringay Racers	ENL	—	38	22	60	26	—	—	—	—	—
1937–38	Harringay Racers	ENL	—	8	5	13	—	—	—	—	—	—
1938–39	Valleyfield Braves	QSHL	36	25	24	49	61	11	5	6	11	8
1939–40	Detroit Red Wings	NHL	1	0	0	0	0	—	—	—	—	—
1939–40	Omaha Knights	AHA	34	14	17	31	14	9	1	7	8	19
1939–40	Ottawa Senators	QSHL	8	0	2	2	0	—	—	—	—	—
1940–41	Omaha Knights	AHA	32	8	14	22	13	—	—	—	—	—
1941–42	Fort Worth Rangers	AHA	50	38	40	78	31	5	3	4	7	7
1942–43	Toronto Navy	OHA Sr	10	3	15	18	4	10	7	9	16	8
1945–46	Tulsa Oilers	USHL	11	7	8	15	4	13	5	4	9	2
1945–46	Valleyfield Braves	QSHL	16	6	9	15	4	—	—	—	—	—
1946–47	Hamilton Tigers	OHA Sr	24	16	17	33	2	7	3	3	6	0
1946–47	Hamilton Tigers	Al-Cup	—	—	—	—	—	9	5	3	8	6
1947–48	Hamilton Tigers	OHA Sr	35	6	13	19	10	10	0	2	2	6
1947–48	Hamilton Tigers	Al-Cup	—	—	—	—	—	6	0	1	1	0
AHA totals			116	60	71	131	58	14	4	11	15	26
NHL totals			1	0	0	0	0	—	—	—	—	—

== See also ==
- List of players who played only one game in the NHL
