= Harvey Fraser =

Canadian ice hockey player

- Born: October 14, 1918 Souris, Manitoba, Canada
- Died: November 15, 1996 (aged 78)
- Height: 5 ft 10 in (178 cm)
- Weight: 168 lb (76 kg; 12 st 0 lb)
- Position: Centre
- Shot: Right
- Played for: Chicago Black Hawks
- Playing career: 1935–1951

Harvey James Fraser (October 14, 1918 – November 15, 1996) was a Canadian ice hockey player who played 21 games in the National Hockey League with the Chicago Black Hawks during the 1944–45 season. The rest of his career, which lasted from 1935 to 1951, was spent in the minor leagues. Harvey was the brother of Archie Fraser

== Career statistics ==
=== Regular season and playoffs ===
			Regular season					Playoffs
Season	Team	League	GP	G	A	Pts	PIM	GP	G	A	Pts	PIM
1935–36	Yorkton Terriers	S-SSHL	17	12	5	17	8	3	5	1	6	0
1936–37	Yorkton Terriers	S-SSHL	24	13	8	21	16	7	5	1	6	6
1937–38	Yorkton Terriers	S-SSHL	24	27	24	51	29	5	3	2	5	4
1938–39	Wembley Monarchs	ENL	—	11	15	26	—	—	—	—	—	—
1939–40	Yorkton Terriers	SSHL	31	32	17	49	14	5	3	1	4	10
1940–41	Yorkton Terriers	SSHL	30	26	18	44	16	9	9	4	13	2
1941–42	Yorkton Terriers	SSHL	4	3	2	5	4	—	—	—	—	—
1942–43	Flin Flon Bombers	SSHL	22	8	11	19	10	8	7	5	12	6
1943–44	Moose Jaw Victorias	SSHL	5	12	4	16	0	—	—	—	—	—
1943–44	Seattle Ironmen	NorIHL	2	2	3	5	0	—	—	—	—	—
1943–44	New Westminster Royals	PCHL	11	9	7	16	4	3	6	5	11	5
1943–44	New Westminster Royals	Al-Cup	—	—	—	—	—	15	5	12	17	6
1944–45	Chicago Black Hawks	NHL	21	5	4	9	0	—	—	—	—	—
1944–45	Providence Reds	AHL	8	7	6	13	4	—	—	—	—	—
1944–45	Cleveland Barons	AHL	13	6	11	17	4	12	1	3	4	4
1945–46	Cleveland Barons	AHL	11	2	5	7	6	—	—	—	—	—
1945–46	New Haven Eagles	AHL	22	4	12	16	4	—	—	—	—	—
1945–46	St. Louis Flyers	AHL	17	9	9	18	6	—	—	—	—	—
1946–47	St. Louis Flyers	AHL	49	21	16	37	17	—	—	—	—	—
1946–47	Providence Reds	AHL	15	7	9	16	4	—	—	—	—	—
1947–48	Providence Reds	AHL	64	45	52	97	12	5	1	2	3	4
1948–49	Providence Reds	AHL	68	34	55	89	16	14	4	7	11	14
1949–50	Providence Reds	AHL	52	20	30	50	4	3	0	2	2	4
1950–51	Hamilton Tigers	OHA Sr	28	15	16	31	12	8	2	4	6	4
AHL totals			219	155	205	360	77	34	6	14	20	26
NHL totals			21	5	4	9	0	—	—	—	—	—
