= Hickey Nicholson =

Canadian ice hockey player

- Born: September 9, 1911 Charlottetown, PEI, Canada
- Died: November 22, 1956 (aged 45) Charlottetown, PEI, Canada
- Height: 5 ft 10 in (178 cm)
- Weight: 170 lb (77 kg; 12 st 2 lb)
- Position: Left wing
- Shot: Left
- Played for: Chicago Blackhawks; Harringay Racers; Richmond Hawks
- Playing career: 1929–1941

John Ivan "Hickey" Nicholson (September 9, 1911 – November 22, 1956) was a Canadian ice hockey player who played two games in the National Hockey League with the Chicago Black Hawks during the 1937–38 season. The rest of his career, which lasted from 1929 to 1941, was mainly spent in the minor leagues. Nicholson was born in Charlottetown, Prince Edward Island in 1911 and died there in 1956.

== Career statistics ==
=== Regular season and playoffs ===
			Regular season					Playoffs
Season	Team	League	GP	G	A	Pts	PIM	GP	G	A	Pts	PIM
1929–30	Moncton Atlantics	NBSHL	1	1	1	2	0	—	—	—	—	—
1929–30	Charlottetown Abbies	PEI Sr	8	6	1	7	28	2	3	0	3	2
1929–30	Charlottetown Islanders	Al-Cup	—	—	—	—	—	2	0	0	0	0
1930–31	Charlottetown Abbies	PEI Sr	11	8	3	11	—	1	0	0	0	2
1931–32	Charlottetown Abbies	MSHL	24	6	3	9	18	—	—	—	—	—
1932–33	Charlottetown Abbies	MSHL	10	0	2	2	12	4	2	0	2	4
1933–34	Charlottetown Abbies	MSHL	39	12	7	19	43	3	2	2	4	4
1934–35	Charlottetown Abbies	MSHL	19	8	15	23	34	6	1	0	1	14
1935–36	Richmond Hawks	ENL	—	8	8	16	—	—	—	—	—	—
1935–36	Harringay Racers	ENL	34	9	8	17	30	—	—	—	—	—
1937–38	Chicago Black Hawks	NHL	2	1	0	1	0	—	—	—	—	—
1937–38	Kansas City Greyhounds	AHA	47	11	17	28	26	—	—	—	—	—
1938–39	Kansas City Greyhounds	AHA	48	16	35	51	33	—	—	—	—	—
1939–40	Kansas City Greyhounds	AHA	47	14	14	28	33	—	—	—	—	—
1940–41	Halifax Army	NSDHL	4	6	2	8	2	—	—	—	—	—
AHA totals			142	41	66	107	92	—	—	—	—	—
NHL totals			2	1	0	1	0	—	—	—	—	—
