= Gib Hutchinson =

Canadian-British ice hockey player

- Born: 25 December 1912 Swift Current, Saskatchewan, Canada
- Died: 30 December 1996 (aged 84) Portslade, England
- Position: Goaltender
- Played for: Earls Court Rangers; Brighton Tigers; Streatham; Wembley Lions
- Playing career: 1937–1953

Gordon Gibson "Gib" Hutchinson (25 December 1912 – 30 December 1996) was a Canadian-British ice hockey goaltender who had a long and successful career in the English National League (ENL). He was inducted into the British Ice Hockey Hall of Fame in 1951. He married Audrey Wells, daughter of boxing champion Bombardier Billy Wells, in 1942.

== Career ==
Hutchinson came to Britain in 1936 when he joined the Earls Court Rangers. However, he had a poor start to his British ice hockey career, giving up 232 goals in forty games. Deciding his future in ice hockey looked bleak, Hutchinson worked as a carpenter at the Earls Court Exhibition Centre. When the goaltender who replaced Hutchinson was injured, he was asked to play again. The following season, 1938–39, Hutchinson was named to the ENL All-star team. An honour he was to receive another four times during his career playing for Streatham, the Wembley Lions and the Brighton Tigers. Whilst with the Tigers, Hutchinson helped them to with the league championship in 1946–47 and 1947–48, and the Autumn Cup in 1946 and 1950.

When Hutchinson retired from playing, he became the stage manager for the Tom Arnold Ice Show at the Brighton Sports Stadium. Later in life, he ran a number of public houses in Sussex before he died on 30 December 1996 at the Mile Oak Inn in Portslade near Brighton.

== Awards and honours ==
- Named to the ENL All-star team in 1939, 1940, 1947, 1948 and 1951.
- Inducted to the British Ice Hockey Hall of Fame in 1951.
