= Fort Worth Rangers =

The Fort Worth Rangers were a minor professional ice hockey franchise based in Fort Worth, Texas. They played in the American Hockey Association (AHA) during the 1941–1942 season and in the United States Hockey League (USHL) from 1945–1946 to 1948–1949. They played home games at the Will Rogers Memorial Center.

== History ==
The Rangers were granted a franchise to play in the AHA for the 1941–1942 season, but they were only able to play in that one season before the AHA ceased operations due to World War II. The league was resurrected for the 1945–1946 season as the USHL, where the Rangers played for four seasons until the team folded after the 1948–1949 season.

The team's most successful seasons on the ice were the 1946–1947 and 1947–1948 seasons, when they finished in second place. The team folded after the 1948–1949 season due to excessive travel expenses.

Fort Worth Rangers Hockey Team 1945–46 (scan of original owned by Devin Pipes)

== Coaches ==
- 1941–42: Gene Carrigan
- 1945–46: Eddie Shore
- 1946–47: Wally Kilrea
- 1947–49: Gordon Savage

== Notable players ==
- Gordie Bell
- Paul Bibeault
- Tony Bukovich
- Gene Carrigan
- Bert Connelly
- Chuck Corrigan
- Bill Cupolo
- Joffre Desilets
- Tommy Filmore
- Tom Fowler
- Harry Frost
- Bill Gooden
- Walter "Red" Jackson
- Vern Kaiser
- Francis Kane
- Ken Kilrea
- Russ Kopak
- Pete Leswick
- George Pargeter
- Bert Peer
- Ray Powell
- Alex Ritson
- Al Rittinger
- Bill Summerhill
- Gordon Tottle
- Bill Warwick
- Don Webster
