= Art Green (ice hockey) =

British ice hockey player

Personal information
- Full name: Arthur William Green
- Nationality: British
- Born: 12 May 1921; Aylesbury, England
- Died: 31 July 2003 (aged 82); Southport, England

Sport
- Sport: Ice hockey
- Position: Defenceman

Arthur William Green (12 May 1921 – 31 July 2003) was a British ice hockey player. He played as a defenceman for various teams in London and represented Great Britain internationally.

Green began playing ice hockey when he was 12. He was given his first trial for Wembley after the coach had noticed him roller skating in the stadium car park. Wembley juniors won the league title in 1937–38 with Green as captain. The following season he played for the Wembley Terriers and was selected in the Great Britain squad for the 1939 World Championships in Switzerland, becoming the youngest ever competitor in the event. In the 1939–1940 season, he played for the Wembley Monarchs in the English National League.

In 1941, Green joined the Royal Air Force. He returned to ice hockey after the war with the Wembley Lions. He was appointed captain of the team for the 1947–1948 season, the first English-born player to captain an English National League side. That season, he was selected in the Great Britain squad for 1948 Winter Olympics. The following season, he joined the Earls Court Rangers. He returned to Wembley in 1950, and retired at the end of the 1952–1953 season.

Green also played football, and scored twice for the victorious Alperton side in the 1940 Wembley Youth Cup final at Wembley. After retiring from ice hockey, he moved to Merseyside. He died in Southport in 2003.
