= Les Anning =

- Born: 17 March 1927 Rimouski, Quebec, Canada
- Died: 28 January 2008 (aged 80) Stayner, Ontario, Canada
- Height: 5 ft 9 in (175 cm)
- Weight: 170 lb (77 kg; 12 st 2 lb)
- Position: Right wing
- Shot: Left
- Played for: Wembley Monarchs; Montreal Royals; Shawinigan-Falls Cataracts; Wembley Lions; Earls Court Rangers; Ayr Raiders; Brighton Tigers; IK Viking
- Playing career: 1946–1965

Les "Rimouski Rocket" Anning (17 March 1927 – 28 January 2008) was an ice hockey player who played mainly in Great Britain during the 1940s and 1950s. He was a member of the British Ice Hockey Hall of Fame.

== Career ==
Anning was born in Rimouski, Quebec, Canada. He came to England when he was 19 years old and joined the Wembley Monarchs for the 1946–47 English National League season. The following season he split his time between the Monarchs in the UK and the Montreal Royals and Shawinigan-Falls Cataracts in the Quebec Senior Hockey League. Anning moved to the Wembley Lions for the 1948–49 season before moving to the Earls Court Rangers for three seasons. Whilst playing for the Rangers, Anning was voted to the All-star team twice and being one third of the high scoring "BAR line" with Kenny Booth and Cliff Ryan.

For the 1954–55 season, Anning moved to play with the Ayr Raiders in the newly formed British National League. However, he moved backed to the Wembley Lions the following season. He then went to the Brighton Tigers for the 1958–59 season before again returning to the Wembley Lions for the 1959–60 season. With the Lions in the late 1950s, Anning was again a member of a high scoring line with Kenny Booth and Les Strongman – known as the "BSA line" – the same post war acronym for the famous British military arms manufacturer "British Small Arms"

Anning spent the 1963–64 and 1964–65 seasons in Sweden playing for IK Viking.

== Awards ==
- Named to the ENL All-star B Team in 1947.
- Named to the ENL All-star A Team in 1951 and 1952.
- Inducted to the British Ice Hockey Hall of Fame in 1999.
