= Al Rittinger =

Canadian ice hockey player

- Born: January 28, 1925 Regina, Saskatchewan, Canada
- Died: December 10, 2017 (aged 92) Delta, British Columbia, Canada
- Height: 5 ft 10 in (178 cm)
- Weight: 170 lb (77 kg; 12 st 2 lb)
- Position: Winger
- Shot: Right
- Played for: Boston Bruins
- Playing career: 1943–1952

Alan Wilber Rittinger (January 28, 1925 – December 10, 2017) was a Canadian ice hockey player who played 19 games in the National Hockey League with Boston Bruins during the 1943–44 season. The rest of his career, which lasted from 1943 to 1952, was spent in different minor leagues.

== Career statistics ==
=== Regular season and playoffs ===
			Regular season					Playoffs
Season	Team	League	GP	G	A	Pts	PIM	GP	G	A	Pts	PIM
1941–42	Regina Abbotts	S-SJHL	—	—	—	—	—	—	—	—	—	—
1942–43	Regina Abbotts	S-SJHL	10	1	4	5	17	4	1	1	2	0
1943–44	Boston Bruins	NHL	19	3	7	10	0	—	—	—	—	—
1943–44	Boston Olympics	EAHL	31	18	25	43	16	8	3	4	7	10
1944–45	Boston Olympics	EAHL	48	29	39	68	100	12	7	12	19	19
1945–46	New Haven Eagles	AHL	14	0	7	7	12	—	—	—	—	—
1945–46	Fort Worth Rangers	USHL	41	12	25	37	32	—	—	—	—	—
1946–47	Seattle Ironmen	PCHL	60	24	26	50	73	10	2	4	6	17
1947–48	Oakland Oaks	PCHL	53	17	29	46	72	—	—	—	—	—
1948–49	Vancouver Canucks	PCHL	16	4	0	4	8	—	—	—	—	—
1949–50	Kerrisdale Monarchs	WKHL	34	23	19	42	68	4	1	1	2	4
1950–51	Kerrisdale Monarchs	WKHL	42	13	17	30	58	—	—	—	—	—
1951–52	Kerrisdale Monarchs	WKHL	21	20	14	34	38	6	4	3	7	8
PCHL totals			129	45	55	100	153	10	2	4	6	17
WKHL totals			97	56	50	106	164	15	6	6	12	16
NHL totals			19	3	7	10	0	—	—	—	—	—
