= Russ Kopak =

Canadian ice hockey player

- Born: April 26, 1924 Edmonton, Alberta, Canada
- Died: November 25, 1998 (aged 74) Bellevue, Washington, United States
- Height: 5 ft 10 in (178 cm)
- Weight: 158 lb (72 kg; 11 st 4 lb)
- Position: Centre
- Shot: Left
- Played for: Boston Bruins
- Playing career: 1943–1950

Russell Jerald Kopak (April 26, 1924 in Edmonton, Alberta – November 25, 1998 in Bellevue, Washington) was a Canadian ice hockey player who played 24 games in the National Hockey League with the Boston Bruins during the 1943–44 season. The rest of his career, which lasted from 1943 to 1950, was spent in different minor leagues.

== Career statistics ==
=== Regular season and playoffs ===
			Regular season					Playoffs
Season	Team	League	GP	G	A	Pts	PIM	GP	G	A	Pts	PIM
1942–43	Regina Abbots	S-SJHL	13	14	8	22	16	4	1	0	1	13
1943–44	Boston Bruins	NHL	24	7	9	16	0	—	—	—	—	—
1943–44	Boston Olympics	EAHL	19	20	24	44	4	9	4	5	9	11
1944–45	Boston Olympics	EAHL	41	41	41	82	53	10	15	10	25	6
1945–46	Fort Worth Rangers	USHL	56	21	31	52	23	—	—	—	—	—
1946–47	Fort Worth Rangers	USHL	59	22	25	47	30	9	0	2	2	2
1947–48	Fort Worth Rangers	USHL	44	15	28	43	23	—	—	—	—	—
1948–49	Fort Worth Rangers	USHL	66	17	33	50	14	2	0	0	0	0
1949–50	Seattle Ironmen	PCHL	72	13	20	33	21	—	—	—	—	—
USHL totals			225	75	117	192	90	11	0	2	2	2
NHL totals			24	7	9	16	0	—	—	—	—	—
