= Alex Ritson =

Canadian ice hockey player

- Born: March 7, 1922; Peace River, Alberta, Canada
- Died: July 18, 2008 (aged 86)
- Height: 5 ft 11 in (180 cm)
- Weight: 172 lb (78 kg; 12 st 4 lb)
- Position: Centre
- Shot: Left
- Played for: New York Rangers
- Playing career: 1941–1952

Alexander Clive Ritson (March 7, 1922 – July 18, 2008) was a Canadian professional ice hockey centre. He played one game in the National Hockey League with the New York Rangers during the 1944–45 season, on January 14, 1945, against the Montreal Canadiens. The rest of his career, which lasted from 1941 to 1952, was spent in the minor leagues.

== Career statistics ==
=== Regular season and playoffs ===
			Regular season					Playoffs
Season	Team	League	GP	G	A	Pts	PIM	GP	G	A	Pts	PIM
1940–41	Regina Generals	S-SJHL	19	9	12	21	14	4	1	5	6	2
1941–42	Tulsa Oilers	AHA	50	14	13	27	12	2	0	0	0	0
1942–43	Washington Lions	AHL	12	5	7	12	0	—	—	—	—	—
1942–43	Providence Reds	AHL	40	9	23	32	19	2	0	0	0	0
1943–44	Indianapolis Capitals	AHL	53	22	21	43	13	5	0	1	1	0
1944–45	New York Rangers	NHL	1	0	0	0	0	—	—	—	—	—
1944–45	Hershey Bears	AHL	42	13	29	42	13	11	5	3	8	4
1945–46	Hershey Bears	AHL	11	0	2	2	4	—	—	—	—	—
1945–46	New Haven Eagles	AHL	14	4	2	6	0	—	—	—	—	—
1945–46	Omaha Knights	USHL	3	0	0	0	5	—	—	—	—	—
1945–46	Fort Worth Rangers	USHL	7	0	4	4	0	—	—	—	—	—
1946–47	Fort Worth Rangers	USHL	60	21	26	47	37	9	1	1	2	0
1947–48	Fort Worth Rangers	USHL	66	22	40	62	42	4	0	1	1	0
1948–49	Tulsa Oilers	USHL	66	16	43	59	73	7	1	1	2	12
1949–50	Cincinnati Mohawks	AHL	6	0	0	0	7	—	—	—	—	—
1949–50	Louisville Blades	USHL	45	10	18	28	18	—	—	—	—	—
1949–50	Seattle Ironmen	PCHL	16	1	4	5	11	4	2	0	2	0
1950–51	Seattle Ironmen	PCHL	3	0	0	0	0	—	—	—	—	—
1950–51	Vernon Vipers	OSHL	47	33	36	69	44	10	4	2	6	4
1951–52	Vernon Vipers	OSHL	48	24	25	49	47	—	—	—	—	—
USHL totals			247	69	131	200	175	20	2	3	5	12
NHL totals			1	0	0	0	0	—	—	—	—	—

== See also ==
- List of players who played only one game in the NHL
