= Ralph Intranuovo =

Canadian ice hockey player

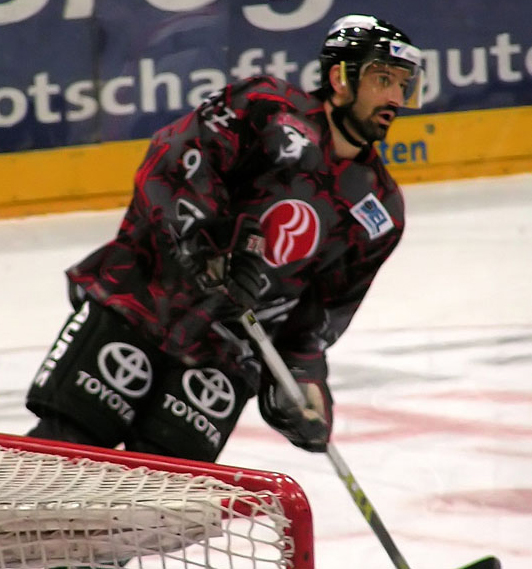
- Born: December 11, 1973 (age 52) East York, Ontario, Canada
- Height: 5 ft 8 in (173 cm)
- Weight: 205 lb (93 kg; 14 st 9 lb)
- Position: Left wing
- Shot: Left
- Played for: Edmonton Oilers; Toronto Maple Leafs; Adler Mannheim; Essen Mosquitoes; EHC Linz; Iserlohn Roosters; EC KAC; Kölner Haie; HDD Olimpija Ljubljana; Asiago Hockey AS; HC Valpellice
- National team: Canada
- NHL draft: 96th overall, 1992; Edmonton Oilers
- Playing career: 1993–2013

Ralph Intranuovo
Medal record

Men's ice hockey

Representing Canada

World Championships
Bronze medal – third place	1995 Sweden	Ice hockey

Ralph Intranuovo (born December 11, 1973) is a Canadian former professional ice hockey left winger. He played 22 games in the National Hockey League with the Edmonton Oilers and Toronto Maple Leafs between 1995 and 1997. The rest of his career, which lasted from 1993 to 2013, was mainly spent in various European leagues. Internationally Intranuovo played for the Canadian national team at the 1995 World Championships, where he won a bronze medal.

== Biography ==
Ralph Intranuovo was born in East York, Ontario the son of Marco Intranuovo, an Italian immigrant, and Rosa Intranuovo. As a youth, he played in the 1987 Quebec International Pee-Wee Hockey Tournament with the Toronto Red Wings minor ice hockey team.

In addition to playing a little hockey, "Iceman" enjoys tennis, baseball, and collecting trading cards. He scored on 25 percent of his shots to lead the 1993 Canadian National Junior Team at the 1993 World Junior Ice Hockey Championships. He registered 3 goals, and 2 assists, helping the Canadians win the gold medal.

Intranuovo was drafted in the fourth round, 96th overall, by the Edmonton Oilers in the 1992 NHL entry draft. He played in twenty-two games in the National Hockey League, nineteen with the Oilers and three with the Toronto Maple Leafs, scoring two goals and four assists.

Intranuovo played for Slovenian team HDD Olimpija Ljubljana of the Erste Bank Hockey League in Austria until 2009. He finished his career in Italian team Asiago Hockey AS.

Ralph Intranuovo is married to his high school sweetheart, Teri-Lou Turco.

== Career statistics ==
=== Regular season and playoffs ===
			Regular season					Playoffs
Season	Team	League	GP	G	A	Pts	PIM	GP	G	A	Pts	PIM
1989–90	Toronto Nationals	GTHL	37	33	26	59	20	—	—	—	—	—
1990–91	Sault Ste. Marie Greyhounds	OHL	63	25	42	67	22	14	7	13	20	17
1990–91	Sault Ste. Marie Greyhounds	Memorial Cup	—	—	—	—	—	3	0	0	0	0
1991–92	Sault Ste. Marie Greyhounds	OHL	65	50	63	113	44	18	10	14	24	12
1991–92	Sault Ste. Marie Greyhounds	M-Cup	—	—	—	—	—	4	1	3	4	4
1992–93	Sault Ste. Marie Greyhounds	OHL	54	31	47	78	61	18	10	16	26	30
1992–93	Sault Ste. Marie Greyhounds	M-Cup	—	—	—	—	—	4	3	4	7	8
1993–94	Cape Breton Oilers	AHL	66	21	31	52	39	4	1	2	3	2
1994–95	Edmonton Oilers	NHL	1	0	1	1	0	—	—	—	—	—
1994–95	Cape Breton Oilers	AHL	70	46	47	93	62	—	—	—	—	—
1995–96	Edmonton Oilers	NHL	13	1	2	3	2	—	—	—	—	—
1995–96	Cape Breton Oilers	AHL	52	34	39	73	84	—	—	—	—	—
1996–97	Edmonton Oilers	NHL	5	1	0	1	2	—	—	—	—	—
1996–97	Hamilton Bulldogs	AHL	68	36	40	76	88	22	8	4	12	30
1996–97	Toronto Maple Leafs	NHL	3	0	1	1	0	—	—	—	—	—
1997–98	Manitoba Moose	IHL	81	26	35	61	68	3	2	0	2	4
1998–99	Manitoba Moose	IHL	71	29	31	60	70	5	2	1	3	4
1999–00	Adler Mannheim	DEL	54	14	19	33	20	5	1	0	1	2
2000–01	Essen Mosquitoes	DEL	51	27	20	47	87	—	—	—	—	—
2001–02	Essen Mosquitoes	DEL	58	20	15	35	66	—	—	—	—	—
2002–03	EHC Linz	AUT	41	26	16	42	36	10	5	3	8	6
2003–04	EHC Linz	EBEL	35	6	6	12	68	—	—	—	—	—
2004–05	Iserlohn Roosters	DEL	51	12	13	25	95	—	—	—	—	—
2005–06	Iserlohn Roosters	DEL	52	24	22	46	38	—	—	—	—	—
2006–07	EC KAC	EBEL	24	15	19	34	24	—	—	—	—	—
2006–07	Kölner Haie	DEL	8	3	2	5	4	9	0	1	1	4
2007–08	Olimpija Ljubljana	EBEL	38	19	19	38	101	14	8	4	12	48
2007–08	Olimpija Ljubljana	SLO	—	—	—	—	—	6	0	3	3	27
2008–09	Olimpija Ljubljana	EBEL	48	15	21	36	46	—	—	—	—	—
2008–09	Olimpija Ljubljana	SLO	—	—	—	—	—	7	2	2	4	6
2009–10	HC Asiago	ITA	35	16	26	42	34	16	9	5	14	8
2010–11	HC Asiago	ITA	36	16	20	36	34	15	1	12	13	37
2011–12	HC Asiago	ITA	28	10	12	22	18	2	0	0	0	2
2011–12	EV Bolzen 84	ITA-2	13	6	10	16	4	—	—	—	—	—
2012–13	HC Valpellice	ITA	44	10	15	25	60	16	1	7	8	24
2014–15	Norwood Vipers	ACH	1	0	0	0	0	—	—	—	—	—
DEL totals			274	100	91	191	310	14	1	1	2	6
NHL totals			22	2	4	6	4	—	—	—	—	—

=== International ===
Year	Team	Event	GP	G	A	Pts	PIM
1993	Canada	WJC	7	3	2	5	4
1995	Canada	WC	8	5	1	6	6
Junior totals			7	3	2	5	4
Senior totals			8	5	1	6	6
