= Tony Bukovich =

American ice hockey player (1915–2009)

- Born: August 30, 1915 Painesdale, Michigan, U.S.
- Died: December 19, 2009 (aged 94) Hancock, Michigan, U.S.
- Height: 5 ft 11 in (180 cm)
- Weight: 160 lb (73 kg; 11 st 6 lb)
- Position: Left wing
- Shot: Left
- Played for: Detroit Red Wings
- Playing career: 1939–1948

Anthony John Bukovich (August 30, 1915 — December 19, 2009) was an American ice hockey player who played 17 games for the Detroit Red Wings in the National Hockey League between 1943 and 1945. The rest of his career, which lasted from 1939 to 1948, was spent in the minor leagues. He was born in Painesdale, Michigan. At the time of his death, at the age of 94 in Hancock, Michigan, he was the oldest former member of the Detroit Red Wings.

== Career statistics ==
=== Regular season and playoffs ===
			Regular season					Playoffs
Season	Team	League	GP	G	A	Pts	PIM	GP	G	A	Pts	PIM
1939–40	Painesdale Pontiac Chiefs	MOHL	24	16	17	33	—	—	—	—	—	—
1940–41	Painesdale Pontiac Chiefs	MOHL	—	—	—	—	—	—	—	—	—	—
1941–42	Fort Worth Rangers	AHA	47	1	4	5	6	5	0	0	0	0
1942–43	Windsor Colonial Tools	MOHL	7	10	6	16	2	7	10	13	23	4
1943–44	Detroit Red Wings	NHL	3	0	1	1	0	—	—	—	—	—
1943–44	Indianapolis Capitals	AHL	6	1	0	1	5	—	—	—	—	—
1944–45	Detroit Red Wings	NHL	14	7	2	9	6	6	0	1	1	0
1944–45	Indianapolis Capitals	AHL	32	22	18	40	43	—	—	—	—	—
1945–46	Indianapolis Capitals	AHL	59	25	28	53	68	5	2	3	5	2
1946–47	Indianapolis Capitals	AHL	49	20	23	43	43	—	—	—	—	—
1947–48	Cleveland Barons	AHL	7	4	2	6	2	3	1	1	2	4
1947–48	Minneapolis Millers	USHL	10	4	4	8	11	—	—	—	—	—
AHL totals			153	72	71	143	161	8	3	4	7	6
NHL totals			17	7	3	10	6	6	0	1	1	0
