= Michael Gaul =

Canadian ice hockey player

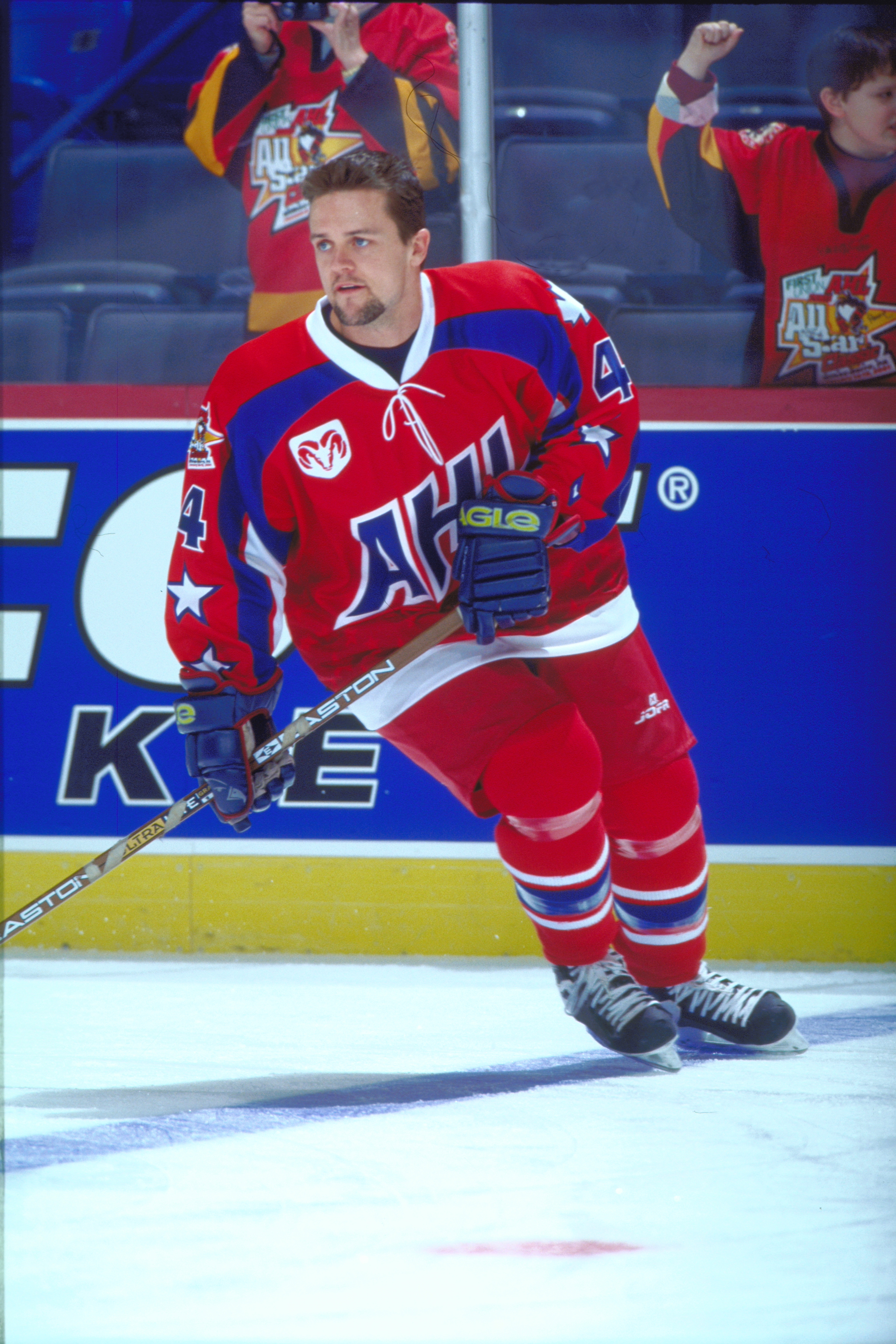
- Gaul in 2001
- Born: April 28, 1973 (age 53) Lachine, Quebec, Canada
- Height: 6 ft 1 in (185 cm)
- Weight: 200 lb (91 kg; 14 st 4 lb)
- Position: Defence
- Shot: Right
- Played for: Colorado Avalanche; Columbus Blue Jackets; HC Fribourg-Gottéron; HC Ambri-Piotta
- NHL draft: 262nd overall, 1991; Los Angeles Kings
- Playing career: 1993–2004

Michael S. "Mike" Gaul (born April 28, 1973) is a Canadian former professional ice hockey defenceman who played in the National Hockey League (NHL).

== Playing career ==
After playing for St. Lawrence University, he was drafted in the ninth round by the Los Angeles Kings in the 1991 NHL entry draft. After a few successful years in the American Hockey League (AHL) He made his National Hockey League debut in the 1998–99 season with the Colorado Avalanche. He also played with the Columbus Blue Jackets in the 2000–01 season. Upon retiring from Professional hockey in 2004, Gaul accepted a position as a senior partner at an Investment Bank Vires Capital VII where he is currently developing and overseeing a portfolio of infrastructure projects totalling over $80B.

== Career statistics ==
| | | | Regular season | | | | | Playoffs |
| Season | Team | League | GP | G | A | Pts | PIM | GP | G | A | Pts | PIM |
|---|---|---|---|---|---|---|---|---|---|---|---|---|
| 1990–91 | St. Lawrence University | ECAC | 26 | 1 | 2 | 3 | 46 | — | — | — | — | — |
| 1991–92 | Laval Titan | QMJHL | 50 | 6 | 38 | 44 | 44 | 10 | 0 | 2 | 2 | 20 |
| 1992–93 | Laval Titan | QMJHL | 57 | 16 | 57 | 73 | 66 | 13 | 3 | 10 | 13 | 10 |
| 1993–94 | Laval Titan | QMJHL | 22 | 10 | 17 | 27 | 24 | 21 | 5 | 15 | 20 | 14 |
| 1994–95 | Knoxville Cherokees | ECHL | 68 | 13 | 41 | 54 | 51 | 4 | 2 | 1 | 3 | 2 |
| 1994–95 | Phoenix Roadrunners | IHL | 4 | 0 | 1 | 1 | 2 | — | — | — | — | — |
| 1995–96 | Knoxville Cherokees | ECHL | 54 | 13 | 48 | 61 | 44 | — | — | — | — | — |
| 1996–97 | EC Timmendorf Strand | Ger.1 | 45 | 22 | 35 | 57 | 67 | — | — | — | — | — |
| 1997–98 | Mobile Mysticks | ECHL | 5 | 0 | 7 | 7 | 0 | — | — | — | — | — |
| 1997–98 | Hershey Bears | AHL | 60 | 12 | 47 | 59 | 69 | 7 | 0 | 7 | 7 | 6 |
| 1998–99 | Lowell Lock Monsters | AHL | 18 | 3 | 5 | 8 | 14 | — | — | — | — | — |
| 1998–99 | Hershey Bears | AHL | 43 | 9 | 31 | 40 | 22 | 5 | 1 | 1 | 2 | 6 |
| 1998–99 | Colorado Avalanche | NHL | 1 | 0 | 0 | 0 | 0 | — | — | — | — | — |
| 1999–00 | Hershey Bears | AHL | 65 | 12 | 57 | 69 | 52 | 12 | 0 | 8 | 8 | 6 |
| 2000–01 | Syracuse Crunch | AHL | 70 | 16 | 45 | 61 | 80 | 5 | 1 | 2 | 3 | 8 |
| 2000–01 | Columbus Blue Jackets | NHL | 2 | 0 | 0 | 0 | 4 | — | — | — | — | — |
| 2001–02 | HC Fribourg-Gottéron | NLA | 44 | 11 | 29 | 40 | 74 | 4 | 0 | 1 | 1 | 10 |
| 2002–03 | Fribourg-Gottéron | NLA | 39 | 6 | 29 | 35 | 32 | — | — | — | — | — |
| 2003–04 | HC Ambri-Piotta | NLA | 30 | 5 | 19 | 24 | 32 | 3 | 0 | 1 | 1 | 2 |
| NHL totals | | | 3 | 0 | 0 | 0 | 4 | — | — | — | — | — |

== Awards and honours ==
| Award | Year |
|---|---|
QMJHL
| All-Rookie Team | 1992 |
| Memorial Cup All-Star Team | 1993 |
AHL
| All-Rookie Team | 1998 |
| All-Star Game | 2000, 2001 |
| Second All-Star Team | 2000 |
