= Keith Campbell (ice hockey) =

Canadian ice hockey player

- Born: September 21, 1909 Stratton, Ontario, Canada
- Died: July 25, 1981 (aged 71) Winnipeg, Manitoba, Canada
- Height: 5 ft 8 in (173 cm)
- Weight: 163 lb (74 kg; 11 st 9 lb)
- Position: Left wing / Defence
- Played for: Pittsburgh Yellow Jackets; Moncton Hawks; Richmond Hawks; Harringay Greyhounds; Harringay Racers; Earls Court Rangers
- Playing career: c. 1935–1952

Keith William "Duke" Campbell (September 21, 1909 – July 25, 1981) was a Canadian ice hockey player who mainly played in Great Britain. Born in Stratton, Ontario, he is a member of the British Ice Hockey Hall of Fame.

== Career ==
Campbell grew up in Winnipeg, Manitoba. Campbell played the 1928–29 season of junior hockey with the St. Vital Saints of the Winnipeg and District Junior League. In 1931–32, Campbell played senior hockey with the Winnipeg Native Sons in the Winnipeg Senior League. He then played two seasons with the Selkirk Fishermen of the Manitoba Senior League from 1932 to 1934. In the 1934–35 season, Campbell played for four teams: the independent Pittsburgh Yellow Jackets, and the Saint John Peters, Moncton Hawks and Saint John Beavers of the Maritime Senior Hockey League. In 1935, Campbell moved to England and Campbell signed with the Richmond Hawks of the English National League (ENL) for the 1935–36 season. Campbell then moved to the Harringay Greyhounds in the 1936–37 season where he stayed for four seasons, helping them to win the ENL in 1937–38 and 1938–39. Whilst with the Greyhounds, Campbell was named as a winger to the All-star A Team of the ENL in 1940.

During World War II, Campbell worked in an aircraft factory. However, he continued to play ice hockey for a Sunday league team in Brighton.

After the War, Campbell briefly joined the Brighton Tigers in the autumn of 1946 before he returned to Harringay to join the Harringay Racers for the remainder of the 1946–47 season and earning his second nomination to the All-star A Team, although this time as a defender. Campbell stayed with the Racers for four seasons, being named to the All-star B Team in 1948 and helping them to win the ENL in 1948–49.

Campbell then joined the Earls Court Rangers in 1950 as player-coach, where he stayed until he retired from ice hockey in 1953 when he was 44 years old. Whilst with the Rangers, Campbell was again named to the All-star B Team, this time as coach in 1952.

Campbell returned to Winnipeg, where he died in 1971.

== Awards ==
- Named to the ENL All-star A-Team in 1940 and 1947.
- Named to the ENL All-star B-Team in 1948.
- Named as coach to the ENL All-star B-Team in 1952.
- Inducted as the first honoured member of the British Ice Hockey Hall of Fame in December 1948.

== Career statistics ==
			Regular season					Playoffs				
Season	Team	League	GP	G	A	Pts	PIM	GP	G	A	Pts	PIM
1935–36	Richmond Hawks	ENL	???	8	7	15	12					
1936–37	Harringay Greyhounds	ENL	Statistics unavailable									
1937–38	Harringay Greyhounds	ENL	Statistics unavailable									
1938–39	Harringay Greyhounds	ENL	Statistics unavailable									
1939–40	Harringay Greyhounds	ENL	???	15	25	40	0					
1946–47	Brighton Tigers	ENL	Statistics unavailable									
1946–47	Harringay Racers	ENL	36	14	38	52	18					
1948–49	Harringay Racers	ENL	42	14	35	49	34					
1949–50	Harringay Racers	ENL	60	17	23	40	18					
1950–51	Earls Court Rangers	ENL	60	15	23	38	18					
1951–52	Earls Court Rangers	ENL	7	1	2	3	0					
1952–53	Earls Court Rangers	ENL	31	0	5	6	2					

Although Campbell's career statistics are incomplete, it is known that he scored 156 goals and 255 assists for 411 points from 545 games, taking 203 penalty minutes in the process.
