= Chad Penney =

Canadian ice hockey player (born 1973)

- Born: September 18, 1973 (age 52) Labrador City, Newfoundland, Canada
- Height: 6 ft 0 in (183 cm)
- Weight: 195 lb (88 kg; 13 st 13 lb)
- Position: Left wing
- Shot: Left
- Played for: Ottawa Senators
- NHL draft: 25th overall, 1992; Ottawa Senators
- Playing career: 1993–1999

Chadwick Paul Penney (born September 18, 1973) is a Canadian former professional ice hockey player. A career minor leaguer, Penney played three games in the National Hockey League (NHL) for the Ottawa Senators during the 1993–94 season. Penney was highly regarded by many as the future left winger to Alexei Yashin after being drafted. Despite impressive numbers with the Ontario Hockey League's North Bay Centennials and later with the American Hockey League's Prince Edward Island Senators, Penney never realized his potential at the NHL level. He is the second player from Labrador to play in the NHL. Dan LaCosta, Pascal Pelletier, and Darryl Williams are the only other three players from Labrador to make it to the NHL. Penney was born in Labrador City, Newfoundland and Labrador.

== Early life ==
Penney was born in Labrador City, Newfoundland and Labrador, but moved to Dartmouth, Nova Scotia as child and grew up there. He played midget hockey in Moncton, New Brunswick.

== Playing career ==
=== Amateur ===
==== North Bay Centennials (1990–1992) ====
Penney was selected by the North Bay Centennials of the Ontario Hockey League (OHL) in the 1990 draft in the second round, 23rd overall. He joined North Bay in the 1990–91 season, and was placed on the team's top line with Derek Switzer and K. J. White as a rookie by head coach Bert Templeton. In 66 games, he scored 34 goals and 34 assists for 67 points. North Bay qualified for the postseason by finishing second in the division and faced the Peterborough Petes in the first round. They swept the Petes only to be eliminated in the next round by the Ottawa 67's. In ten playoff games, Penney scored two goals and eight points.

Ahead of the 1991–92 season, his linemates, Switzer and White, left the team in the offseason. Playing on a new line with Jason Firth and Jack Williams, Penney added 25 goals and 52 points in 57 games for the Centennials. He missed OHL games attending the 1992 World Junior Championship. In the postseason, North Bay advanced to the OHL's championship series versus the Sault Ste. Marie Greyhounds having defeated the Petes, Sudbury Wolves and Belleville Bulls. Penney played on a line with John Spoltore and Mark Lawrence in the playoffs. The Centennials lost to the Greyhounds in the finals in seven games. Penney tallied 13 goals and 30 points in 21 playoffs games. Penney began the 1992–93 season with North Bay, where in 18 games, he scored eight goals and 15 points. Penney, along with defenceman Wade Gibson, was traded from the rebuilding Centennials to the Sault Ste. Marie Greyhounds on November 16, 1992, in an eight-player trade.

==== Sault Ste. Marie Greyhounds (1992–1993) ====
Considered an expensive acquisition in the Greyhounds' general manager Sherry Bassin's attempt to win a Memorial Cup and nothing more than a "hired gun", was also used as a penalty killer by head coach Ted Nolan. Penney finished the season recording 28 goals and 73 points, and helping the club reach the postseason. Sault Ste. Marie earned a first round playoff bye for winning the Emms Division, but as the OHL, which was hosting the Memorial Cup that season, had not named a host city, the two division-winning teams, the Greyhounds and the Peterborough Petes faced off in an OHL Superseries. The Greyhounds defeated the Petes and automatically qualified for the Memorial Cup as the host city. The Greyhounds advanced to the OHL championship series for the third season in a row and faced the Petes, who proceeded to defeat Sault Ste. Marie. In the playoffs, Penney scored seven goals and 17 points in 18 games.

With Sault Ste. Marie hosting the 1993 Memorial Cup, the Greyhounds were automatically entered into the round-robin tournament as the host team, facing the champions of the three Canadian major junior leagues; the OHL's Petes, the Swift Current Broncos of the Western Hockey League and the Laval Titan of the Quebec Major Junior Hockey League. In the opening game of the tournament, Penney scored two goals, including the game winner, in a 3–2 victory over the Titan. In the last game of the round-robin portion, Penney added two goals in a 7–3 victory over the Petes, with the Greyhounds advancing the cup final with the win. He scored in the final, a 4–3 victory over the Petes, earning the franchise its first Memorial Cup. In four games, Penney scored five goals and seven points. Penney was named to the Memorial Cup all-star team.

=== Professional ===
==== Ottawa Senators (1992–1996) ====
Penney was selected by the Ottawa Senators of the National Hockey League (NHL) in the second round, 25th overall, of the 1992 NHL entry draft. He signed a three-year contract with the Senators in May 1993. He joined the Senators for their training camp in September, but suffered a broken hand early in camp. On September 23, he was assigned to Ottawa's American Hockey League (AHL) affiliate, the Prince Edward Island Senators, to recuperate. He made his professional debut on October 13 in a 6–5 win over the Moncton Hawks. He was recalled on October 20 after appearing in three games in the AHL, scoring two goals and five points. With Ottawa, Penney replaced Vladimír Růžička, who was sidelined by injury. Penney made his NHL debut in the 1993–94 season on October 21 in a 6–5 overtime loss to the Dallas Stars. In total, Penney appeared in three games, going scoreless, before Růžička returned from injury and Penney was sent back to Prince Edward Island. Playing on a line with former Centennials teammate Jason Firth and Pavol Demitra, Penney scored 20 goals and 50 points in 73 games with Prince Edward Island. The team finished last in the Atlantic Division and missed the playoffs.

Penney was assigned to Prince Edward Island during training camp in September 1994 ahead of the projected 1994–95 NHL lockout. Penney spent the entire 1994–95 season with PEI, scoring 16 goals and 32 points in 66 games. The Senators won the AHL's Atlantic Division in the regular season and qualified for the 1995 Calder Cup playoffs. They faced the Saint John Flames in the opening round, eliminating them in five games, earning the franchise its first playoff series victory. They faced the Fredericton Canadiens in the second round, and Penney scored the team's first goal in the opening game Senators win in the series on April 27. However, the Senators were eliminated by Canadiens 4 games to 2. In 11 playoff games, Penney scored two goals and four points.

He attended Ottawa's training camp in September 1995, but once again found himself assigned to PEI to begin the 1995–96 season. After a series of injuries ravaged Ottawa's lineup, Penney was among the players recalled from the AHL in early October. However, the recall was brief, after five players returned from injury and Penney was returned to PEI without playing a game. Penney saw recorded 23 goals and 60 points in 79 games, playing on a line with Demitra and Shawn Heaphy in December, and then on the team's top line with Jean-Yves Roy and Steve Guolla in March 1996. PEI qualified for the playoffs once again, finishing tied for first in the division with the Saint John Flames, but took the title as division champions based on having more wins. They faced Fredericton in the first round and were eliminated in five games. Penney was scratched for games 2 and 3 after a poor opening game in the series. In three playoff games, Penney had a goal and two points.

==== Manchester Storm (1996–1997) ====
An unrestricted free agent from the Senators in the 1996 offseason, In September, Penney headed to the United Kingdom to sign for the Manchester Storm of the British Ice Hockey Superleague for the 1996–97 season. His debut was delayed by three weeks as he waited for a work permit. In 39 games, Penney scored nine goals and 25 points for the Storm, finishing sixth in team scoring. He also added in one goal and two points in six playoff games, as the team failed to make the semi-finals.

==== Kentucky Thoroughblades (1997–1998) ====
Penney returned to the AHL for the 1997–98 season, joining the Kentucky Thoroughblades. Early in the season, he went on a 15-game goalless drought, ending it with a two-goal performance on November 21 against the Fredericton Canadiens. Placed on a line with Sean Haggerty and Niklas Andersson, in 78 games, Penney had 16 goals and 37 points. The Thoroughblades made the playoffs and faced the Hershey Bears in the opening round best-of-five series. Hershey swept Kentucky in three games. Penney appeared in two playoff games and did not earn any points.

==== Colorado Gold Kings (1998–1999) ====
Penney attended the Orlando Solar Bears of the International Hockey League 1998 training camp, but was released in late September. He then signed with the Colorado Gold Kings of the West Coast Hockey League for the 1998–99 season. He was suspended for three games in December by the league, along with his coach. In 67 games, Penney scored 31 goals and 77 points, helping Colorado reach the postseason. In three playoff games, Penney had two assists.

== International play ==
Penney was selected to play for Team Canada at the 1992 World Junior Championships. He was only the third player from Newfoundland and Labrador to play for the Canadian junior team, after Dwayne Norris and John Slaney. The team finished in sixth place, with Penney appearing in all seven games, going scoreless.

== Personal life ==
Penney moved back east to New Brunswick after his playing days and worked for the city of Fredericton.

== Career statistics ==
=== Regular season and playoffs ===
			Regular season					Playoffs
Season	Team	League	GP	G	A	Pts	PIM	GP	G	A	Pts	PIM
1989–90	Dartmouth Olands Express	NSAHA	45	41	54	95	—	—	—	—	—	—
1990–91	North Bay Centennials	OHL	66	33	34	67	56	10	2	6	8	12
1991–92	North Bay Centennials	OHL	57	25	27	52	90	21	13	17	30	9
1992–93	North Bay Centennials	OHL	18	8	7	15	19	—	—	—	—	—
1992–93	Sault Ste. Marie Greyhounds	OHL	48	29	44	73	67	18	7	10	17	18
1992–93	Sault Ste. Marie Greyhounds	M-Cup	—	—	—	—	—	4	5	2	7	6
1993–94	Ottawa Senators	NHL	3	0	0	0	2	—	—	—	—	—
1993–94	PEI Senators	AHL	73	20	30	50	66	—	—	—	—	—
1994–95	PEI Senators	AHL	66	16	16	32	19	11	2	2	4	2
1995–96	PEI Senators	AHL	79	23	37	60	48	3	1	1	2	0
1996–97	Manchester Storm	BISL	39	9	16	25	48	6	1	1	2	6
1997–98	Kentucky Thoroughblades	AHL	78	16	21	37	43	2	0	0	0	0
1998–99	Colorado Gold Kings	WCHL	67	31	46	77	58	3	0	2	2	4
AHL totals			296	75	104	179	176	16	3	3	6	2
NHL totals			3	0	0	0	2	—	—	—	—	—

=== International ===
Year	Team	Event	GP	G	A	Pts	PIM
1992	Canada	WJC	7	0	0	0	2
Junior totals			7	0	0	0	2

== Bibliography ==
- Lapp, Richard M.; Macauley, Alex (1997). The Memorial Cup: Canada's National Junior Hockey Championship. Madeira Park, British Columbia: Harbour Publishing. ISBN 1-55017-170-4.
- Ottawa Senators 2024–25 Media Guide. Ottawa, Ontario: Ottawa Senators Hockey Club. 2024.
- Podnieks, Andrew (1998). Red, White, and Gold: Canada at the World Junior Championships 1974–1999. Toronto: ECW Press. ISBN 1-55022-382-8.
