= Norm Gustavsen =

Canadian ice hockey player (1927–1993)

- Born: September 8, 1927 Timmins, Ontario, Canada
- Died: May 16, 1993 (aged 65) United States
- Height: 6 ft 0 in (183 cm)
- Weight: 210 lb (95 kg; 15 st 0 lb)
- Position: Defense
- Shot: Right
- Played for: Tacoma Rockets; Vancouver Canucks; Syracuse Warriors; Charlottetown Islanders; Philadelphia Ramblers
- Playing career: 1946–1962

Norman "Gus" Gustavsen (September 8, 1927 – May 16, 1993) was a Canadian professional ice hockey player who played for the Tacoma Rockets and Vancouver Canucks in the Pacific Coast Hockey League, Syracuse Warriors in the American Hockey League, Charlottetown Islanders in the Maritime Major Hockey League (serving as captain), and Philadelphia Ramblers in the Eastern Hockey League. Gustavsen died in the United States on May 16, 1993, at the age of 65.
