= 1949–50 English National League season =

English ice hockey league season

The 1949–50 English National League season was the ninth season of the English National League, the top level ice hockey league in England. Seven teams participated in the league, and the Streatham Royals won the championship.

== Regular season ==
	Club	GP	W	T	L	GF–GA	Pts
1.	Streatham Royals	24	14	2	8	96:86	30
2.	Wembley Monarchs	24	12	4	8	126:108	28
3.	Harringay Racers	24	12	3	9	125:108	27
4.	Wembley Lions	24	12	0	12	119:112	24
5.	Brighton Tigers	24	9	4	11	113:126	22
6.	Nottingham Panthers	24	10	1	13	126:151	21
7.	Earls Court Rangers	24	7	4	13	86:100	18
