= Aaron Gavey =

Canadian ice hockey player (born 1974)

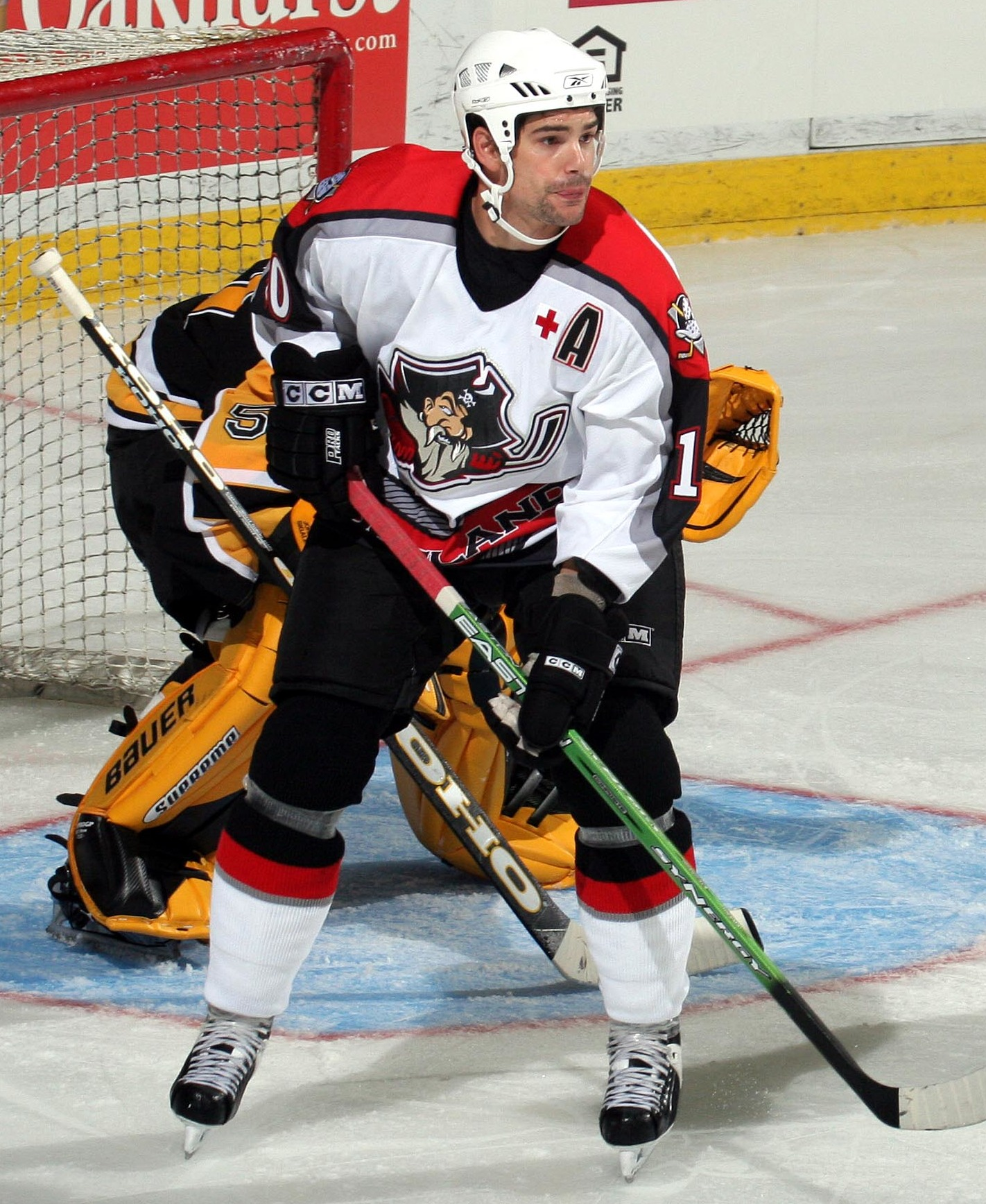
- Gavey with the Portland Pirates in 2005
- Born: February 22, 1974 (age 52) Sudbury, Ontario, Canada
- Height: 6 ft 2 in (188 cm)
- Weight: 189 lb (86 kg; 13 st 7 lb)
- Position: Centre
- Shot: Left
- Played for: Tampa Bay Lightning; Calgary Flames; Dallas Stars; Minnesota Wild; Toronto Maple Leafs; Mighty Ducks of Anaheim; Cologne Sharks
- NHL draft: 74th overall, 1992; Tampa Bay Lightning
- Playing career: 1994–2007

Aaron Gavey (born February 22, 1974) is a Canadian former professional ice hockey player. He last played in the Deutsche Eishockey Liga for the Kölner Haie (Cologne Sharks).

== Playing career ==
As a youth, Gavey played in the 1987 Quebec International Pee-Wee Hockey Tournament with a minor ice hockey team from Cornwall, Ontario.

Gavey played his minor hockey for the Peterborough Minor Petes (OMHA) before spending the 1990-91 season as a 16-year-old playing for the Peterborough Roadrunners Jr.B. club. Following that season, he was selected in the 1st round (15th overall) in the 1991 OHL Priority Selection held in Kitchener, Ontario.

Gavey played major junior hockey for the Sault Ste. Marie Greyhounds in the Ontario Hockey League from 1991 through 1994, during which time he tallied 94 goals and 110 assists in 170 games. The Greyhounds played in the Memorial Cup all three years, winning the tournament in 1993 and finishing as the runner-up in 1992.

Gavey was drafted 74th overall by the Tampa Bay Lightning in the 1992 NHL entry draft and has played for six different NHL teams including the Tampa Bay Lightning, Calgary Flames, Dallas Stars, Minnesota Wild, Toronto Maple Leafs, and the Mighty Ducks of Anaheim. He has played 355 career NHL games, scoring 41 goals and 50 assists for 91 points.

During the 2004/05 season, he had a very brief stint with the Storhamar Dragons of Hamar, Norway. He only played two games before leaving the club. He moved to Germany and played for the Kölner Haie in season 2006/07. His contract was not renewed.

== Career statistics ==
=== Regular season and playoffs ===
			Regular season					Playoffs
Season	Team	League	GP	G	A	Pts	PIM	GP	G	A	Pts	PIM
1990–91	Peterborough Petes	COJHL	42	26	30	56	68	—	—	—	—	—
1991–92	Sault Ste. Marie Greyhounds	OHL	48	7	11	18	27	19	5	1	6	10
1992–93	Sault Ste. Marie Greyhounds	OHL	62	45	39	84	114	18	5	9	14	36
1993–94	Sault Ste. Marie Greyhounds	OHL	60	42	60	102	116	14	11	10	21	22
1994–95	Atlanta Knights	IHL	66	18	17	35	85	5	0	0	1	9
1995–96	Tampa Bay Lightning	NHL	73	8	4	12	56	6	0	0	0	4
1996–97	Tampa Bay Lightning	NHL	16	1	2	3	12	—	—	—	—	—
1996–97	Calgary Flames	NHL	41	7	9	16	34	—	—	—	—	—
1997–98	Calgary Flames	NHL	26	2	3	5	24	—	—	—	—	—
1997–98	Saint John Flames	AHL	8	4	3	7	28	—	—	—	—	—
1998–99	Michigan K-Wings	IHL	67	24	33	57	128	5	2	3	5	4
1998–99	Dallas Stars	NHL	7	0	0	0	10	—	—	—	—	—
1999–00	Michigan K-Wings	IHL	28	14	15	29	73	—	—	—	—	—
1999–00	Dallas Stars	NHL	41	7	6	13	44	13	1	2	3	10
2000–01	Minnesota Wild	NHL	75	10	14	24	52	—	—	—	—	—
2001–02	Minnesota Wild	NHL	71	6	11	17	48	—	—	—	—	—
2002–03	St. John's Maple Leafs	AHL	70	14	29	43	83	—	—	—	—	—
2002–03	Toronto Maple Leafs	NHL	5	0	1	1	0	—	—	—	—	—
2003–04	St. John's Maple Leafs	AHL	75	22	45	67	100	—	—	—	—	—
2004–05	Utah Grizzlies	AHL	60	5	14	19	59	—	—	—	—	—
2005–06	Portland Pirates	AHL	72	16	31	47	106	—	—	—	—	—
2005–06	Mighty Ducks of Anaheim	NHL	5	0	0	0	2	—	—	—	—	—
2006–07	Kölner Haie	DEL	39	7	4	11	91	9	5	3	8	20
NHL totals			360	41	50	91	272	19	1	2	3	14
