= 1948–49 English National League season =

English ice hockey league season

The 1948–49 English National League season was the eighth season of the English National League, the top level ice hockey league in England. Eight teams participated in the league, and the Harringay Racers won the championship.

== Regular season ==
	Club	GP	W	T	L	GF–GA	Pts
1.	Harringay Racers	28	20	3	5	179:98	43
2.	Streatham Royals	28	13	6	19	116:109	32
3.	Harringay Greyhounds	28	15	2	11	131:124	32
4.	Nottingham Panthers	28	12	5	11	122:126	29
5.	Wembley Monarchs	28	11	4	13	126:119	26
6.	Brighton Tigers	28	10	2	16	116:142	22
7.	Earls Court Rangers	28	7	7	14	104:131	21
8.	Wembley Lions	28	9	3	16	102:147	21

== Rosters ==
=== Brighton Tigers ===
Gib Hutchinson, Fish Robertson, Gordie Poirier, Al Truelove, Bill Booth, Bill Rooker, Johnny Oxley, Bobby Lee, Tommy Durling, Lorne Trottier, Lefty Willmot, Casey Stangle, Lee Thorne, Jimmy Chappell, Lennie Baker, Ted Cumming, Harry Vedan.

=== Earl's Court Rangers ===
Johnny Bourada, Stan Simon, Arthur Green, Hal Meyer, Willis Mosdell, Joe Farley, Kenny Campbell, Henry Hayes, Abbie Hodkinson, Kenny Booth, Walt Sullivan, Stan DeQuoy, Harold Young, Alf Harvey, Rocky Rothwell.

=== Harringay Greyhounds ===
Tommy Donachey, Bill Allan, Gunnar Telkkinen, Ted Hallam, Duke Macdonald, Ken Kennedy, Ed Blondin, Alf Menchini, Johnny Gauthier, Wyn Cook, Ross Planch, Gaston Gauthier, Freddie Dunkleman, Terry McGibbon.

=== Harringay Racers ===
Lorne Lussier, Duke Campbell, Danny Linton, Pat Coburn, Joe Shack, Bill Glennie, Pete Payette, Ricky Ricard, Ronnie Lay, George Steele, Toby Defalco, Erwin Duncan, Edwin Duncan.

=== Nottingham Panthers ===
Dick Halverson, Jim Herriot, Kenny Westman, Roger Goodman, Bill Allen, Archie Stinchcombe, Chick Zamick, Ed Young, Wally Black, Paul Theriault, Hal Brown, Larry McKay, Maurice Laforge.

=== Streatham ===
Monty Reynolds, Harold Smith, Art Hodgins, Bob Brodrick, Paddy Ryan, Doug Wilson, George Drysdale, Bud McEachern, Johnny Costigan, Jimmy Campbell, Johnny Sergnese, George Baillie, Red Stapleford, Vic Niemi, Dave Miller, Norm Gustavsen.

=== Wembley Lions ===
Wilf McCluskey, Vic Shettler, Frank Orlando, Vic Berke, Earl Mollard, Gerry Rowse, Eric Fleet, Toddy Thurston, Don Stay, Stan Petrow, Mal Davidson, Vern Smith, Johnny Pyryhora, Stan Obodiac, Don Mann, Goldie Goldstrand, Bert Oig.

=== Wembley Monarchs ===
Stubby Mason, Sonny Rost, Red Kurz, Don Thomson, Roy Thompson, Marvin Thomson, George Beach, Freddie Sutherland, Mac McLachlan, Kid Kauppi, Jean-Paul Lafortune, Les Anning, Frank Trottier.
