= George Pargeter =

Canadian ice hockey player (1923–2005)

- Born: 24 February 1923 Calgary, Alberta, Canada
- Died: 2 October 2005 (aged 82)
- Height: 170 cm (5 ft 7 in)
- Weight: 76 kg (168 lb; 12 st 0 lb)
- Position: Left wing
- Shot: Left
- Played for: Montreal Canadiens
- Playing career: 1942–1955

George William Pargeter (February 24, 1923 – October 2, 2005) was a Canadian professional ice hockey forward who played four games in the National Hockey League for the Montreal Canadiens during the 1946–47 season. The rest of his career, which lasted from 1942 to 1955, was spent in various minor leagues. He was born in Calgary, Alberta.

== Career statistics ==
=== Regular season and playoffs ===
| | | | Regular season | | | | | Playoffs |
| Season | Team | League | GP | G | A | Pts | PIM | GP | G | A | Pts | PIM |
|---|---|---|---|---|---|---|---|---|---|---|---|---|
| 1941–42 | Calgary Royals | CCJHL | — | — | — | — | — | — | — | — | — | — |
| 1941–42 | Calgary Royals | M-Cup | — | — | — | — | — | 2 | 2 | 0 | 2 | 0 |
| 1942–43 | Red Deer Wheelers | ASHL | 24 | 18 | 9 | 27 | 8 | — | — | — | — | — |
| 1943–44 | Red Deer Wheelers | ASHL | 16 | 5 | 6 | 11 | 8 | 5 | 2 | 6 | 8 | 7 |
| 1944–45 | Buffalo Bisons | AHL | 53 | 25 | 14 | 39 | 12 | 6 | 3 | 5 | 8 | 0 |
| 1945–46 | Fort Worth Rangers | USHL | 14 | 8 | 4 | 12 | 0 | — | — | — | — | — |
| 1945–46 | New Haven Eagles | AHL | 48 | 21 | 15 | 36 | 6 | — | — | — | — | — |
| 1946–47 | Montreal Canadiens | NHL | 4 | 0 | 0 | 0 | 0 | — | — | — | — | — |
| 1946–47 | Springfield Indians | AHL | 58 | 14 | 24 | 38 | 21 | — | — | — | — | — |
| 1947–48 | Houston Huskies | USHL | 26 | 11 | 16 | 27 | 2 | — | — | — | — | — |
| 1947–48 | Buffalo Bisons | AHL | 33 | 3 | 4 | 7 | 2 | 8 | 1 | 1 | 2 | 0 |
| 1948–49 | Buffalo Bisons | AHL | 66 | 31 | 34 | 65 | 18 | — | — | — | — | — |
| 1949–50 | Buffalo Bisons | AHL | 8 | 21 | 23 | 44 | 9 | 5 | 1 | 0 | 1 | 2 |
| 1950–51 | Buffalo Bisons | AHL | 63 | 20 | 24 | 44 | 6 | 4 | 0 | 1 | 1 | 0 |
| 1951–52 | Buffalo Bisons | AHL | 51 | 7 | 15 | 22 | 8 | 3 | 0 | 0 | 0 | 0 |
| 1952–53 | Seattle Bombers | WHL | 69 | 16 | 33 | 49 | 4 | 5 | 2 | 0 | 2 | 0 |
| 1953–54 | Calgary Stampeders | WHL | 67 | 20 | 15 | 35 | 4 | 18 | 5 | 8 | 13 | 2 |
| 1954–55 | Calgary Stampeders | WHL | 70 | 17 | 19 | 36 | 10 | 9 | 2 | 2 | 4 | 0 |
| NHL totals | | | 4 | 0 | 0 | 0 | 0 | — | — | — | — | — |
