= 1951–52 English National League season =

English ice hockey league season

The 1951–52 English National League season was the 11th season of the English National League, the top level ice hockey league in England. Six teams participated in the league, and the Wembley Lions won the championship.

== Regular season ==
	Club	GP	W	T	L	GF–GA	Pts
1.	Wembley Lions	30	17	4	9	156:120	38
2.	Earls Court Rangers	30	17	1	12	166:147	35
3.	Streatham Royals	30	14	4	12	127:132	32
4.	Brighton Tigers	30	13	3	14	139:134	29
5.	Harringay Racers	30	12	3	15	137:145	27
6.	Nottingham Panthers	30	9	1	20	122:169	19
