= 1933 Memorial Cup =

Canadian junior ice hockey championship

The Memorial Cup trophy

The 1933 Memorial Cup final was the 15th junior ice hockey championship of the Canadian Amateur Hockey Association. The George Richardson Memorial Trophy champions Newmarket Redmen of the Ontario Hockey Association in Eastern Canada competed against the Abbott Cup champions Regina Pats of the South Saskatchewan Junior Hockey League in Western Canada. In a best-of-three series, held at Maple Leaf Gardens in Toronto, Ontario, Newmarket won their 1st Memorial Cup, defeating Regina 2 games to 0.

== Scores ==
- Game 1: Newmarket 2-1 Regina
- Game 2: Newmarket 2-1 Regina (3OT)

== Winning roster ==
Silver Doran, Ran Forder, Chief Huggins, Pep Kelly, Norm Mann, Aubrey Marshall, Red McArthur, M. Ogilvie, Jimmy Parr, Howard Peterson, Gar Preston, Sparky Vail, Don Willson. Coach: Bill Hancock
