= 1950–51 English National League season =

English ice hockey league season

The 1950–51 English National League season was the 10th season of the English National League, the top level ice hockey league in England. Six teams participated in the league, and the Nottingham Panthers won the championship.

== Regular season ==
	Club	GP	W	T	L	GF–GA	Pts
1.	Nottingham Panthers	30	18	3	9	156:105	39
2.	Brighton Tigers	30	16	6	8	150:116	38
3.	Wembley Lions	30	12	3	15	140:161	27
4.	Streatham Royals	30	11	5	14	116:139	27
5.	Harringay Racers	30	10	5	15	142:167	25
6.	Earls Court Rangers	30	10	4	16	144:160	24
