= 1952–53 English National League season =

English ice hockey league season

The 1952–53 English National League season was the 12th season of the English National League, the top level ice hockey league in England. Six teams participated in the league, and the Streatham Royals won the championship.

== Regular season ==
	Club	GP	W	T	L	GF–GA	Pts
1.	Streatham Royals	30	21	3	6	188:126	45
2.	Harringay Racers	30	19	2	9	183:144	40
3.	Nottingham Panthers	30	15	3	12	144:144	33
4.	Earls Court Rangers	30	15	0	15	166:172	30
5.	Brighton Tigers	30	7	3	20	107:151	17
6.	Wembley Lions	30	6	3	21	131:179	15
