= 1953–54 English National League season =

English ice hockey league season

The 1953–54 English National League season was the 13th and final season of the English National League, the top level ice hockey league in England. Five teams participated in the league, and the Nottingham Panthers won the championship.

The league merged with the Scottish National League to form the British National League for the 1954-55 season.

== Regular season ==
	Club	GP	W	T	L	GF–GA	Pts
1.	Nottingham Panthers	24	15	4	5	136:106	34
2.	Streatham Royals	24	15	3	6	144:101	33
3.	Harringay Racers	24	7	5	12	133:160	19
4.	Wembley Lions	24	7	4	13	135:164	18
5.	Brighton Tigers	24	6	4	14	138:155	16
