= 1946–47 English National League season =

English ice hockey league season

The 1946–47 English National League season was the sixth season of the English National League, the top level ice hockey league in England. Seven teams participated in the league, and the Brighton Tigers won the championship.

== Regular season ==
| | Club | GP | W | T | L | GF–GA | Pts |
|---|---|---|---|---|---|---|---|
| 1. | Brighton Tigers | 36 | 24 | 5 | 7 | 221:142 | 53 |
| 2. | Harringay Racers | 36 | 21 | 3 | 12 | 222:173 | 45 |
| 3. | Wembley Lions | 36 | 20 | 1 | 15 | 166:157 | 41 |
| 4. | Harringay Greyhounds | 36 | 14 | 5 | 17 | 166:167 | 33 |
| 5. | Streatham | 36 | 14 | 5 | 17 | 177:196 | 33 |
| 6. | Wembley Monarchs | 36 | 14 | 1 | 21 | 163:191 | 29 |
| 7. | Nottingham Panthers | 36 | 7 | 4 | 25 | 134:223 | 18 |
