= 1935–36 English National League season =

English ice hockey league season

The 1935–36 English National League season was the first season of the English National League, the top level ice hockey league in England. Seven teams participated in the league, and the Wembley Lions won the championship.

== Regular season ==
	Club	GP	W	T	L	GF–GA	Pts
1.	Wembley Lions	24	15	3	6	96:54	33
2.	Richmond Hawks	24	14	5	5	83:52	33
3.	Streatham	24	14	4	6	68:50	32
4.	Wembley Canadians	24	14	2	8	59:57	30
5.	Earl's Court Rangers	24	10	4	10	98:88	24
6.	Brighton Tigers	24	3	3	18	49:98	9
7.	Kensington Corinthians	24	2	3	19	64:138	7
