= 1937–38 English National League season =

English ice hockey league season

The 1937–38 English National League season was the third season of the English National League, the top level ice hockey league in England. Seven teams participated in the league, and the Harringay Racers won the championship.

== Regular season ==
	Club	GP	W	T	L	GF–GA	Pts
1.	Harringay Racers	24	17	3	4	81:42	37
2.	Wembley Lions	24	7	10	7	60:59	24
3.	Wembley Monarchs	24	10	4	10	70:53	24
4.	Harringay Greyhounds	24	9	5	10	56:61	23
5.	Brighton Tigers	24	10	2	12	72:101	22
6.	Earl's Court Rangers	24	8	5	11	76:73	21
7.	Streatham	24	7	3	14	58:84	17
