= 1938–39 English National League season =

English ice hockey league season

The 1938–39 English National League season was the fourth season of the English National League, the top level ice hockey league in England. Six teams participated in the league, and the Harringay Greyhounds won the championship.

Streatham was suspended from the league early in the season, by the Association, for the use of players who had previously been subjected to disciplinary action, and were thus ineligible, in two matches.

== Regular season ==
	Club	GP	W	T	L	GF–GA	Pts
1.	Harringay Greyhounds	30	16	6	8	106:78	38
2.	Wembley Lions	30	13	11	6	103:82	37
3.	Earls Court Rangers	30	13	8	9	105:91	34
4.	Harringay Racers	30	14	5	11	91:88	33
5.	Wembley Monarchs	30	9	7	14	88:104	25
6.	Brighton Tigers	30	3	7	20	80:130	13
