= 1936–37 English National League season =

English ice hockey league season

The 1936–37 English National League season was the second season of the English National League, the top level ice hockey league in England. 11 teams participated in the league, and the Wembley Lions won the championship.

== Regular season ==
	Club	GP	W	T	L	GF–GA	Pts
1.	Wembley Lions	40	30	2	8	171:100	62
2.	Harringay Racers	40	27	5	8	158:88	59
3.	Harringay Greyhounds	40	23	9	8	144:97	55
4.	Earls Court Rangers	40	23	5	12	192:138	51
5.	Wembley Monarchs	40	18	6	16	150:138	42
6.	Brighton Tigers	40	16	5	19	137:133	37
7.	Streatham	40	12	10	18	135:154	34
8.	Southampton Vikings	40	9	10	21	143:175	28
9.	Earl's Court Royals	40	11	5	24	161:232	27
10.	Manchester Rapids	40	8	10	22	113:161	26
11.	Richmond Hawks	40	8	3	29	108:196	19
