= Earls Court Rangers =

Former English ice hockey team

- Founded: 1935
- Dissolved: 1953
- League: English National League
- Based in: London
- Arena: Earls Court Arena
- Colours: Orange and chocolate; (1935–37); Orange and black; (1937–39 & 1948–51); Gold, black and white; (1951–53)
- Head coach: George Redding (1937–39)

Earls Court Rangers were an early English ice hockey team that played in the English National League. They were formed in 1935 and disbanded in 1953. They played their home games at the Earls Court Arena in west London, England at Empress Hall; played only 9 seasons interrupted in 1939 by World War II.

== Empress Hall ==
In September 1953, the British Ice Hockey association announced that in the upcoming season the Earls Court Rangers would not play. The club's directors chose not to play that season because its headquarters, Empress Hall in London, was undergoing structural alterations. The alterations were expected to take three months, but in fact the Empress Hall was never rebuilt and now Earls Court 2 and Lillie Road Bus and Tube Depot stand in its spot.

The team was formed in 1935 and played in the league every year until 1940, then from 1948 to 1953. From 1940 to 1947, Empress Hall was under government requisition.

== 1937 Fixtures ==
Earl Nicholson, of Harringay Greyhounds, and Howie Peterson, of Earl's Court Rangers, were suspended on 31 December 1937 until 23 January 1938 for 26 days which was at the time the longest suspension awarded in British ice hockey when both Canadian players "tried to take each other apart" when Earls Court Rangers lost 4–2 against Harringay Greyhounds on 29 December 1937. On 6 November 1937 Princess Maria Gabriella of Savoy when visiting London saw Earls Court Rangers play against Harringay Racers.

== Coaches ==
Frank Currie – player coach

== Notable players ==
Name	Nationality	Position	Timespan	Ref
Les Anning	Canadian	Winger	1951–1953	
Gerry Brown	Canadian	Winger	1937–1939	
Keith Campbell	Canadian	Winger	1949–1953	
Jack Forsey	Canadian	Winger	1936–1939	
Art Green	British	Defenceman	1948–1950	
Bill Jennings	Canadian	Winger	1938–1939	
Gib Hutchinson	Canadian-British	Goaltender	1937–1939	
Leo Lamoureux	Canadian	Defenceman	1938–1939	
Bobby Lee	Canadian	Centre	1937–1939	
George McNeil	Canadian	Defenceman/winger	1937–1938	
Don Willson	Canadian	Centre	1935–1937	
Robert Wyman	British	Defenceman	1937–1938	

== See also ==
- Empress State Building
- Wembley Canadians
