= History of the Nottingham Panthers (1939–1960) =

History of the original Nottingham Panthers between 1939 and 1960

The history of the original Nottingham Panthers between 1939 and 1960 covers the history of the Nottingham Panthers ice hockey team from the initial attempts to establish the club in 1939 and the team's first season in 1946 to the closure of the Panthers in 1960.

Originally planned to begin play in 1939 after the opening of the Nottingham Ice Stadium, World War II prevented this from happening until 1946. The Nottingham Panthers would go on to play for fourteen seasons, claiming three league championships and one Autumn Cup title. The Panthers joined the new British National League in 1954 and following the league's collapse in 1960 the club were left with little option but to fold. The Nottingham Panthers would eventually be reformed two decades later and continue play to this day.

== 1939–1950: Formation, World War II and early years ==
The Nottingham Ice Stadium opened on 10 April 1939 and hosted its first game of ice hockey two days later when the Harringay Racers defeated the Harringay Greyhounds 10–6 in a challenge game. The souvenir brochure published to mark the Stadium's opening included details of a new professional ice hockey team called the Nottingham Panthers to begin play in the English National League that autumn. A team was assembled in Canada and brought to the United Kingdom, but at the outbreak of World War II they were promptly sent home having not played a single game; some of the players never saw the Ice Stadium.

However, three challenge games were played by a team during 1939–40 styling themselves the Nottingham Panthers. They began on 15 November 1939 when the Panthers lost 7–4 to a team of Canadians based at the nearby RAF Grantham. The second match on 2 December 1939 had the Panthers 8–7 over the 'RAF (Canadians Section). The final match on 2 February 1940 was a 12–1 triumph over the 'Cambridge Canadians'. Like their opposition, these Panthers teams were made up of Canadian soldiers based in and around Nottingham. The Stadium was requisitioned soon afterwards for use as a makeshift munitions store and morgue, preventing further ice hockey games from taking place.

The Ice Stadium reopened on 31 August 1946 and plans were immediately made to bring a professional team to the venue. The new club appointed Olympic gold medalist and former Wembley Lions player Alex 'Sandy' Archer as their coach and he recruited a team largely from his home city of Winnipeg, Manitoba. The Panthers made their competitive debut on 22 November 1946 when they defeated the Wembley Monarchs 3–2 at the Ice Stadium. The following day they played their first away game, losing 11–3 to the Harringay Greyhounds. The club's first season was a difficult one. After their opening night win the Panthers would win just six more games and finish bottom of the seven team English National League by eleven points.

Archer brought in five new players for the club's second season. A late withdrawal led Archer to recruit 21-year-old Chick Zamick to the team. The Panthers continued to struggle, finishing next to last in the Autumn Cup and English League tables and third from bottom in the English National Tournament, level on points with the two clubs below them. Zamick led the team in scoring, with 65 goals and 124 points in his first season.

Archer left the club during the close season and was replaced by another of Great Britain's Olympic winning team, Archie Stinchcombe. Stinchcombe's first season saw a small improvement in the club's fortunes with a fifth-placed finish in the Autumn Cup, a fourth-placed finish in the league standings and a runners-up spot in the International Tournament (a competition involving all the members of the English League apart from Harringay Racers along with French side Racing Club de Paris). Zamick was again the top scorer, with 134 points in total.

Nottingham's first silverware came the following season when they lifted the Sussex Daily News Cup, a competition involving the Panthers, Brighton Tigers, Earls Court Rangers and Streatham. This followed a third-place finish in the Autumn Cup and a sixth-place finish in the league. In 1949 Zamick won the Nottingham Sportsman of the Year award for the first time, beating opposition such as the Notts County and England centre forward Tommy Lawton.

== 1950–1955: Contrasting fortunes ==
The 1950–51 began with a fourth-place finish in the Autumn Cup. In the league, the Panthers were involved in a two-horse race with Brighton for the league championship. The two sides went head-to-head on the penultimate weekend of the season, with Panthers winning 7–3 in Brighton before drawing 2–2 in Nottingham the following day. The Panthers secured their first league title with a 9–4 victory over the Rangers at Earls Court in their final game of the season. Chick Zamick scored 39 goals during the league campaign and won a second Nottingham Sportsman of the Year award. The 1950–51 also saw the Panthers undertake a tour of Sweden. The team defeated Djurgårdens IF and Södertälje SK and played two games against the Sweden national team, winning one and losing the other.

The club toured Sweden for a second time during December 1951. The Panthers defeated AIK and Hammarby IF before again splitting two games against the Sweden national side. After a second-place finish in the Autumn Cup, the Panthers' season took a bad turn in February 1952 when Zamick broke his left arm. The team won only eight more games and the reigning league champions fell to the bottom of the standings. Despite playing only 41 games, Zamick remained the club's top points scorer, earning 47 goals and 98 points in total. The club fared slightly better during the 1952–53 season, finishing fourth in the Autumn Cup and third in the English League.

The 1953–54 season began poorly for the Panthers. The team won only nine of their thirty games in the Autumn Cup and finished bottom of the table. The Panthers fared no better in the four-team London Cup, finishing bottom of the table with only three wins. Stinchcombe strengthened the team for the beginning of the league campaign in early February and the Panthers soon emerged as one of the contenders for the championship. With defending champions Streatham their closest challengers, the Panthers tied their final game away at Brighton to claim the single point they needed to win their second title.

In 1954 the Panthers became part of the new British National League. This new structure involved four of the five members of the English League and the eight members of the Scottish National League. The membership of the league fell to eleven following the withdrawal of Dunfermline Vikings early in the league campaign and it was soon announced that all Scottish clubs apart from Paisley Pirates would be withdrawing at the end of the season. The Panthers finished in second place in the league behind Harringay Racers. In the summer Archie Stinchcombe departed after a seven-year spell as coach, to be replaced by Chick Zamick.

== 1955–1960: The British League years and closure ==
The 1955–56 would prove to be one of the club's most successful. After losing six of their first twelve games in the Autumn Cup, Panthers would win the next eleven and tie their final game to win the title by seven points over Paisley Pirates. In the league, Nottingham were triumphant in a tight league race that saw only eight points separate first and last place. The championship went right down to the wire, with Panthers needing 11–10 and 7–6 wins over Harringay Racers on the final weekend of the season to claim the title on goal average over the Wembley Lions. The Panthers also travelled to Sweden where they won the Ahearne Cup and entertained Sweden, Czechoslovakia and the United States in challenge games.

In contrast, the 1956–57 season saw the Panthers fall to the bottom of the standings in the Autumn Cup and the league. During December, Nottingham toured Czechoslovakia and Germany where they played the Czechoslovak national team and club sides including Köln, Düsseldorf and Mannheim. In 1957–58 the Panthers finished third in the Autumn Cup table and a runner-up to Brighton Tigers in the league and again undertook a tour of Czechoslovakia.

After an eleven association with the Panthers, Chick Zamick left Nottingham in the summer of 1958 to take up a coaching position in Geneva. He was replaced by player Lorne Smith. Though Edinburgh took part in the Autumn Cup, the 1958–59 league consisted of only four teams after the closure of the Harringay Arena. Panthers finished bottom in both competitions. The following season Streatham rejoined the league after a five-year absence. The 1959–60 season also saw the reintroduction of the British Championship after a thirty-year absence. After a third-place finish in the Autumn Cup, the Panthers finished second in the league to qualify for Championships.

In the semi-final the Panthers faced the league champions Streatham. The Panthers were defeated 5–4 in the first leg in London but won the second leg 3–1 to win the tie 7–6. In the final the Panthers faced Brighton who had defeated Paisley 11–8 in the other semi final. The first leg was played in Brighton, with the Tigers winning 3–2. A week later, on 6 May 1960, the Panthers won the second leg by the same scoreline, forcing the first overtime the club had ever taken part in. The Tigers clinched the tie 6–5 after 6.32 of the extra session to win the Championship. This would prove to be the final game the original Nottingham Panthers played.

During the summer of 1960, the British National League collapsed. Faced with the prospect of no regular income the Ice Stadium took the decision to disband the Panthers. The club remained dormant for the next twenty years. The main figure behind the reformation of the club in 1980 was Gary Keward, a fan of the original Panthers while the first coach of the reformed side was a former player, Les Strongman.

== Honours ==
- British League champions: 1955–56
- English League champions: 1950–51, 1953–54
- Autumn Cup champions: 1955–56
- Ahearne Cup winners: 1955–56
- Sussex Daily News Cup winners: 1949–50
