= Mike Blaisdell =

Canadian ice hockey player and coach

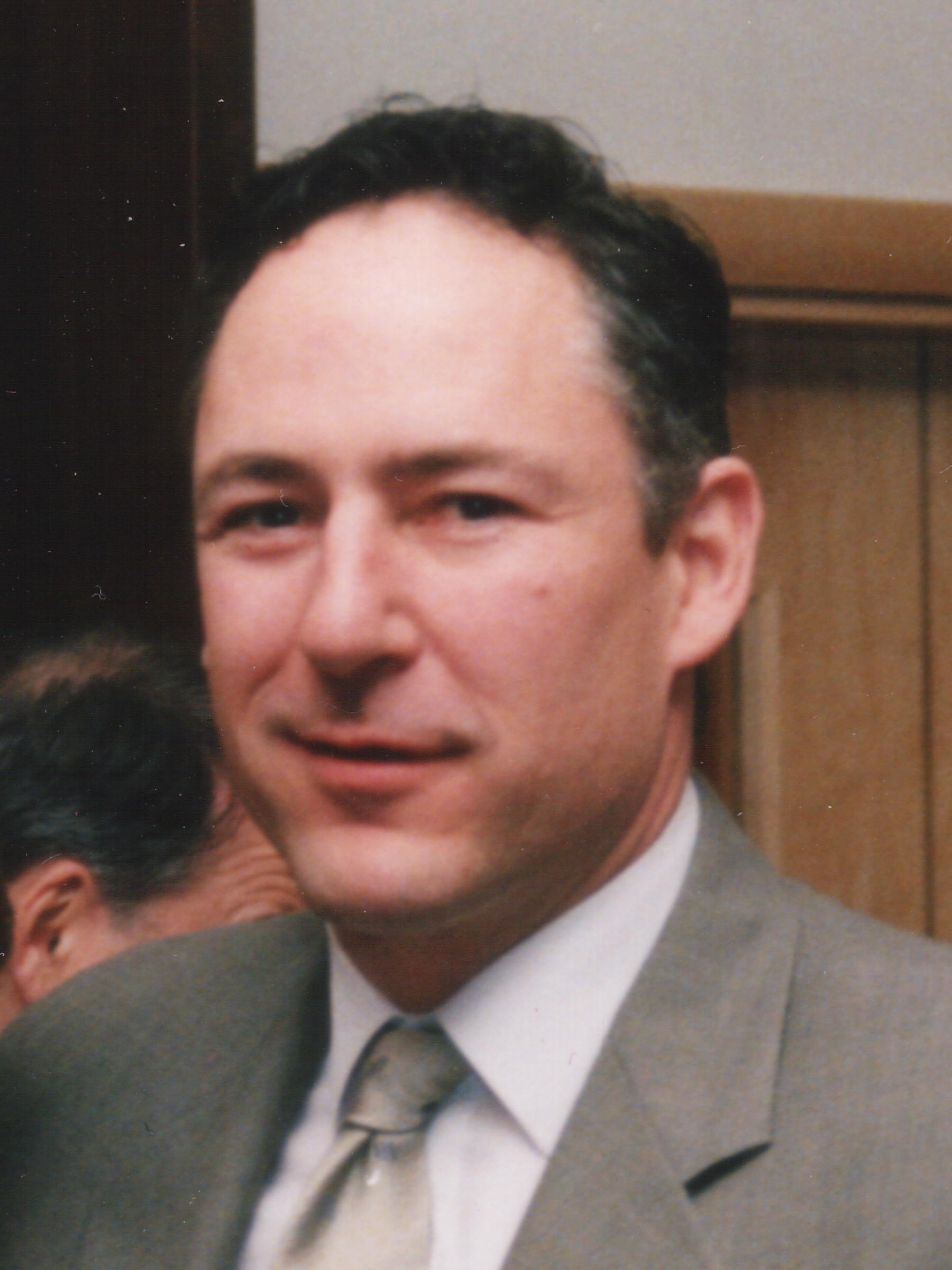
- Blaisdell circa 2001
- Born: January 18, 1960 (age 66) Moose Jaw, Saskatchewan, Canada
- Height: 6 ft 1 in (185 cm)
- Weight: 200 lb (91 kg; 14 st 4 lb)
- Position: Right Wing
- Shot: Right
- Played for: Detroit Red Wings; New York Rangers; Pittsburgh Penguins; Toronto Maple Leafs; Schwenninger ERC; Durham Wasps; Nottingham Panthers; Sheffield Steelers
- NHL draft: 11th overall, 1980; Detroit Red Wings
- Playing career: 1980–2001

Michael Walter Blaisdell (born January 18, 1960) is a Canadian former professional ice hockey right winger who played in the National Hockey League (NHL) between 1980 and 1989 and later in the British Hockey League (BHL) from 1990 to 2001. He was selected 11th overall in the 1980 NHL entry draft by the Detroit Red Wings. Blaisdell later worked as a coach in the United Kingdom.

== Professional career ==
=== Amateur and college hockey ===
Blaisdell was born in Moose Jaw, Saskatchewan and raised in Regina, Saskatchewan. In 1978, Blaisdell joined the Regina Pats of the WCHL (later the WHL for the end of the 1977-78 regular season and the playoffs. In the final six games of the season, Blaisdell scored 5 goals and 5 assists, for 10 points and a 1.66 points per game average. He added 11 points in 13 playoff games. The following season, Blaisdell played 20 games at University of Wisconsin–Madison before returning to the Pats for the 1979–80 WHL season.

=== NHL career ===
In the 1980 NHL entry draft the Detroit Red Wings took Blaisdell with their 11th overall pick. They placed him in their farm team the Adirondack Red Wings of the American Hockey League (AHL) and instantly saw his potential. After just 41 games, Blaisdell was called up to play for Detroit. In the 1981–82 season, Blaisdell formed a solid unit with Mark Kirton and Paul Woods. He scored 23 goals and ended with 55 points that season but the Red Wings failed to reach the playoffs. He continued to chip in goals for the Red Wings and on June 13, 1983 was involved in a large trade to the New York Rangers with Willie Huber and Mark Osborne for Ron Duguay, Eddie Mio and Eddie Johnstone.

Most of Blaisdell's time with the Rangers was spent in and out of their farm teams; the Tulsa Oilers of the Central Hockey League (CHL) and the New Haven Nighthawks of the AHL. He won the 1983-84 CHL Championship (Adams Cup) as a member of the Tulsa Oilers team coached by Tom Webster. Due to bankruptcy, the Oilers suspended operations on February 16, 1984, and the team played only road games for final six weeks of 1983-84 season. Despite this adversity, the team went on to win the league's championship. Blaisdell played in all nine playoff games, and lead the team in both goals (6 - tied with Bob Scurfield) and points (12 - tied with Gary Burns).

After failing to find a role in the organization, he was claimed in the 1985 NHL Waiver Draft by the Pittsburgh Penguins on October 7, 1985. He scored 15 goals and played some of his best two-way hockey during the 1985–86 season, but his playing time decreased the next year while splitting time with Pittsburgh's farm team, the Baltimore Skipjacks. After that season, Blaisdell was signed as a free agent by the Toronto Maple Leafs on July 10, 1987 but only played in 27 games for the Leafs for the following two years, which would be his last in the National Hockey League.

=== International play ===
Blaisdell played with the Canadian National Team during the 1990–91 season. Partway through, he changed his mind and decided to look for other opportunities. He joined the roster of Schwenninger ERC in West Germany's Eishockey-Bundesliga for three games and then the Albany Choppers of the International Hockey League (IHL) before heading back to Europe, joining the Durham Wasps of the British Hockey League where he instantly became a fan favourite. He went on to score a record-breaking 74 goals in 1991–92 leading the Wasps to the second of their back-to-back championships. Blaisdell added 41 points the following season before coaching with the Nottingham Panthers. After coaching for half the year, Blaisdell felt he still offered more when he was on the ice. In the 1995–96 season, Blaisdell scored 35 goals to finish with 81 points on the season. Blaisdell slowly drew away from the league (by then called the Ice Hockey Superleague), but would continue to play in a few games until 2001 when he played his last four games for the Sheffield Steelers before retiring.

=== Coach Blaisdell ===
Blaisdell again returned to coaching in the 2001–02 season with the team he last stepped on the ice for, the Sheffield Steelers, and finished the 2003–04 season with a record of 44–8–3 and a 0.821 win percentage. He led the Steelers to the league's best record and won the League Championship before retiring from hockey.

== Personal life ==
Blaisdell's son Harrison played junior hockey for the Chilliwack Chiefs in the British Columbia Hockey League and later attended the University of North Dakota.

== Career statistics ==
=== Regular season and playoffs ===
			Regular season					Playoffs
Season	Team	League	GP	G	A	Pts	PIM	GP	G	A	Pts	PIM
1977–78	Regina Pat Blues	SJHL	60	70	46	116	43	—	—	—	—	—
1977–78	Regina Pats	WCHL	6	5	5	10	2	13	4	7	11	0
1978–79	University of Wisconsin	WCHA	23	7	2	9	19	—	—	—	—	—
1979–80	University of Wisconsin	WCHA	1	0	0	0	2	—	—	—	—	—
1979–80	Regina Pats	WHL	63	71	38	109	62	18	16	9	25	26
1979–80	Regina Pats	M-Cup	—	—	—	—	—	4	4	5	9	0
1980–81	Detroit Red Wings	NHL	32	3	6	9	10	—	—	—	—	—
1980–81	Adirondack Red Wings	AHL	41	10	4	14	8	12	2	2	4	5
1981–82	Detroit Red Wings	NHL	80	23	32	55	48	—	—	—	—	—
1982–83	Detroit Red Wings	NHL	80	18	23	41	22	—	—	—	—	—
1983–84	New York Rangers	NHL	36	5	6	11	31	—	—	—	—	—
1983–84	Tulsa Oilers	CHL	32	10	8	18	23	9	6	6	12	6
1984–85	New York Rangers	NHL	12	1	0	1	11	—	—	—	—	—
1984–85	New Haven Nighthawks	AHL	64	21	23	44	41	—	—	—	—	—
1985–86	Pittsburgh Penguins	NHL	66	15	14	29	36	—	—	—	—	—
1986–87	Pittsburgh Penguins	NHL	10	1	1	2	2	—	—	—	—	—
1986–87	Baltimore Skipjacks	AHL	43	12	12	24	47	—	—	—	—	—
1987–88	Toronto Maple Leafs	NHL	18	3	2	5	2	6	1	2	3	10
1987–88	Newmarket Saints	AHL	57	28	28	56	30	—	—	—	—	—
1988–89	Toronto Maple Leafs	NHL	9	1	0	1	4	—	—	—	—	—
1988–89	Newmarket Saints	AHL	40	16	7	23	48	—	—	—	—	—
1989–90	Canadian National Team	Intl	50	12	18	30	40	—	—	—	—	—
1989–90	Schwenninger ERC	GER	3	1	0	1	0	—	—	—	—	—
1990–91	Albany Choppers	IHL	6	2	0	2	0	—	—	—	—	—
1990–91	Durham Wasps	BHL	18	36	35	71	114	8	24	14	38	18
1990–91	HC Sierre	NDA	5	4	0	4	6	—	—	—	—	—
1991–92	Durham Wasps	BHL	36	74	52	126	86	8	11	13	24	22
1992–93	Durham Wasps	BHL	13	23	18	41	46	—	—	—	—	—
1994–95	Nottingham Panthers	BHL	11	7	10	17	60	—	—	—	—	—
1995–96	Nottingham Panthers	BHL	33	26	33	59	77	8	1	6	7	4
1996–97	Nottingham Panthers	BISL	7	2	2	4	6	—	—	—	—	—
1998–99	Nottingham Panthers	BISL	3	0	1	1	0	—	—	—	—	—
2000–01	Sheffield Steelers	BISL	4	0	1	1	0	—	—	—	—	—
AHL totals			245	87	74	161	174	12	2	2	4	5
BHL totals			111	166	148	314	383	24	36	33	69	44
NHL totals			343	70	84	154	166	6	1	2	3	10

=== Coaching ===
			Regular season
Season	Team	League	G	W	L	T	OTL	PCT	Finished	Playoffs
1993–94	Nottingham Panthers	BHL	44	26	16	2	—	.591	5th	Semi-final
1994–95	Nottingham Panthers	BHL	44	32	8	4	—	.727	2nd	Semi-final
1995–96	Nottingham Panthers	BHL	36	19	12	4	—	.528	4th	Runners up
1996–97	Nottingham Panthers	BISL	44	21	20	1	2	.477	4th	Runners up
1997–98	Nottingham Panthers	BISL	44	22	18	4	0	.500	5th	Preliminary Round Group A
1998–99	Nottingham Panthers	BISL	42	25	14	1	2	.595	3rd	Runners up
1999–00	Nottingham Panthers	BISL	—	—	—	—	—	—	—	—
1999–00	Sheffield Steelers	BISL	—	—	—	—	—	—	1st	Semi-final
2000–01	Sheffield Steelers	BISL	48	35	9	0	4	.729	1st	Winners
2001–02	Sheffield Steelers	BISL	48	18	18	12	0	.375	3rd	Winners
2002–03	Sheffield Steelers	BISL	32	18	8	5	1	.563	1st	Semi-final
2003–04	Sheffield Steelers	EIHL	56	44	8	3	1	.786	1st	Winners
2005–06	Nottingham Panthers	EIHL	42	23	11	6	2	.548	3rd	Preliminary Round Group B

== Awards ==
- WHL Second All-Star Team – 1980
- AHL Calder Cup in 1981 (Adirondack Red Wings)
- CHL Championship Adams Cup in 1984 (Tulsa Oilers)
- Great Britain Championship: 1991, 1992 (Durham) 2001 (Sheffield) (as head coach), 2002 (Sheffield) (as head coach)
- Ice Hockey Journalists UK Coach of the Year in 1994–95, 2000–01, 2002–03 and 2003–04
- Inducted to the British Ice Hockey Hall of Fame in 2004
- Inducted to the Sheffield Steelers Hall of Fame in 2006

Awards
Preceded by John Lawless; Dave Whistle; Dave Whistle	BIHWA Coach of the Year; 1994–95; 2000–01; 2002–03, 2003–04	Succeeded by Paul Heavey; Dave Whistle; Paul Thompson
Sporting positions
Preceded by Mike Foligno	Detroit Red Wings first-round draft pick 1980	Succeeded by Murray Craven
Preceded by Kevin Murphy	Nottingham Panthers Head Coach; 1993–99	Succeeded by Alex Dampier
Preceded by Don McKee	Sheffield Steelers Head Coach; 1999–04	Succeeded by Rob Stewart
Preceded by Paul Adey	Nottingham Panthers Head Coach; 2005–06	Succeeded by Mike Ellis
