= Nottingham Arena =

Indoor multi use events arena

Nottingham Arena Motorpoint Arena Nottingham

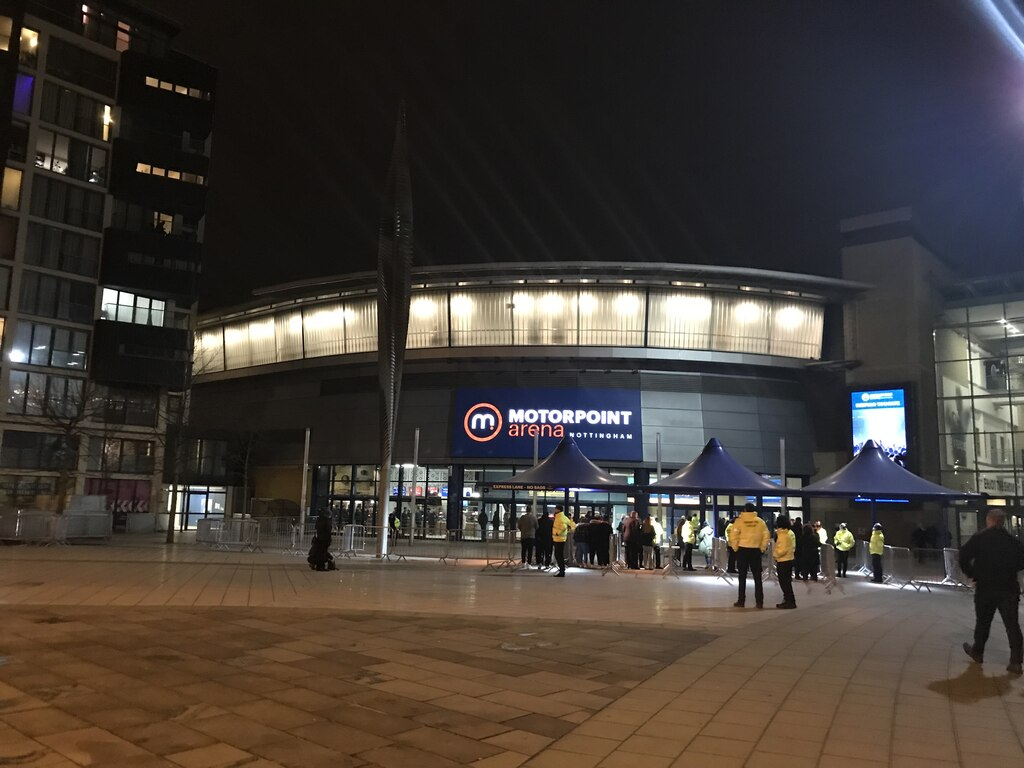
- Interactive map of Nottingham Arena; Motorpoint Arena Nottingham
- Full name: Nottingham Arena
- Former names: Trent FM Arena (2008–2011); Capital FM Arena (2011–2015)
- Address: Bolero Square; The Lace Market; Nottingham NG1 1LA; England
- Location: National Ice Centre
- Coordinates: 52°57′10″N 1°8′22″W
- Owner: Nottingham City Council
- Operator: Nottingham Ice Centre Ltd
- Capacity: 10,000 without standing room (15,865 with standing room)

Construction
- Groundbreaking: August 1998
- Built: 1998–2000
- Opened: 1 April 2000
- Expanded: 2011
- Architect: FaulknerBrowns
- Project manager: Gleeds
- Structural engineer: Ove Arup
- Services engineer: Ove Arup
- Main contractor: John Laing Group

Tenant
- Nottingham Panthers (2000–present) Nottingham Forest Netball (2025-present)

Website
- Venue Website

Nottingham Arena (known for sponsorship reasons as Motorpoint Arena Nottingham) is a multi-use indoor arena, part of the National Ice Centre in the Lace Market district of Nottingham, England. The National Ice Centre and Nottingham Arena were opened by Olympic gold medalist Jayne Torvill on 1 April 2000. The arena is the biggest live entertainment venue in the East Midlands.

== History ==
=== Background ===
The arena is part of the National Ice Centre which was constructed on the site of the former Nottingham Ice Stadium. The ice stadium opened in 1939 and was showing its age, so, in September 1995, plans were announced to replace the Ice Stadium. Plans for the new ice rink, supported by the British Olympic Association, were unveiled in October 1996.

=== Construction ===
Several buildings were demolished to make way for the new ice centre; this included an Art Deco warehouse and "The Old Cricket Players" pub, which was initially spared but closed a few years later and replaced with apartments. The former Ice Stadium closed in March 2000, and by May 2000 was described as "nearly demolished", with four skip loads of demolition rubble being removed from the site every day.

During excavation for the new building in July 1998 a rare 1,100-year-old Saxon jug was found, which is on display at the Nottingham Castle Museum. A 19th-century graveyard was also found under the car park, from which the bodies were then exhumed.

=== Opening ===
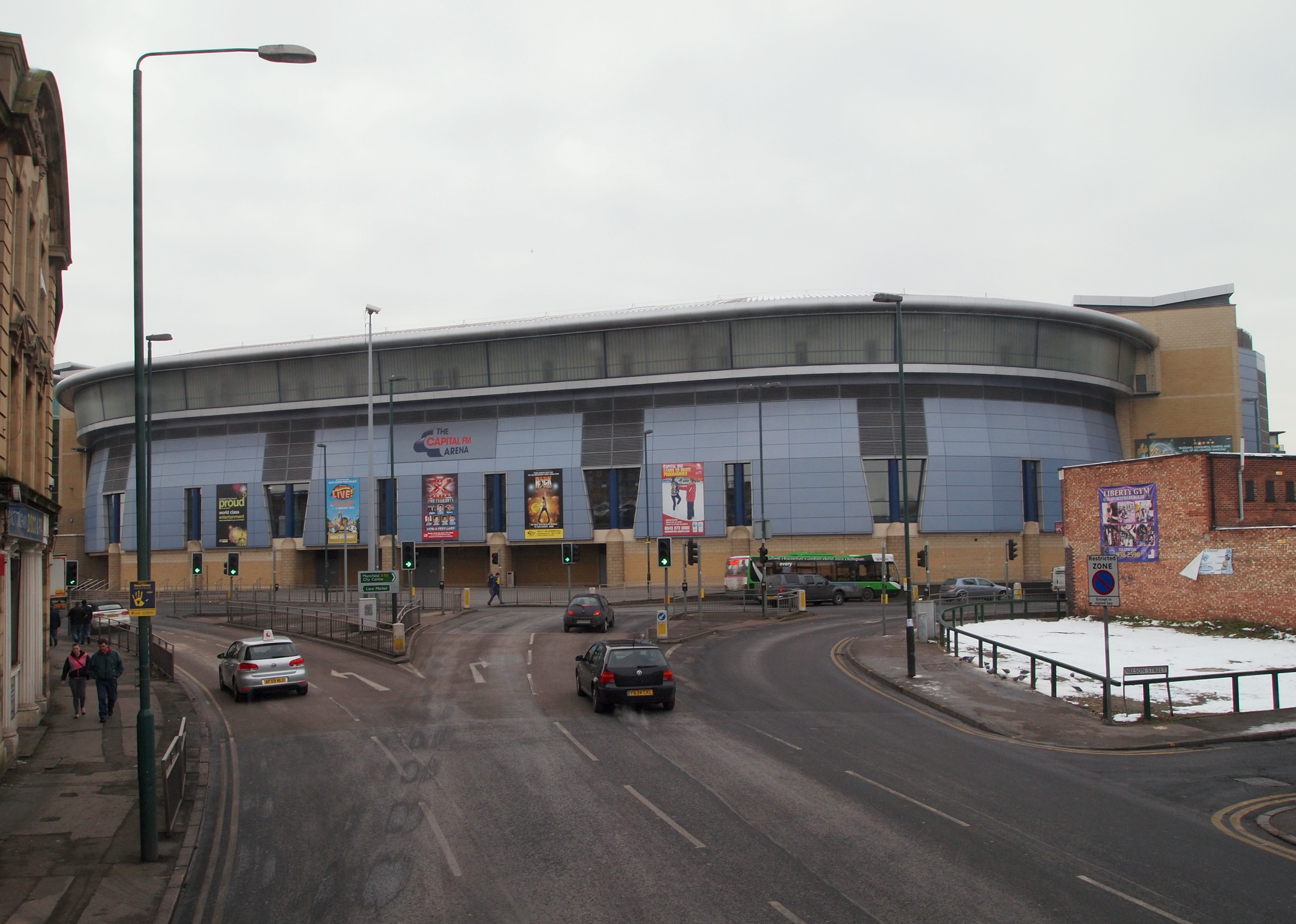
The arena, under 2011–15 signage, viewed from Southwell Road (2013)

On 1 April 2000, the National Ice Centre was officially opened by Olympic gold medalist Jayne Torvill. The second phase of the project — the family rink — was scheduled to be completed by May–June 2001, but opened early on 7 April 2001. The National Ice Centre was the first twin Olympic-sized ice rink in the United Kingdom. The final cost of the project was £43 million. The arena was inaugurated by English band, Simply Red on 29 April 2000.

By 2002, the arena was not as popular as planned. The venue posted an operating loss of £1 million in its first year. Concert promoters would often have acts skip Nottingham in favour of Sheffield and Birmingham. Elizabeth II visited the National Ice Centre and adjoined arena on 31 July 2002.

In 2007, former radio station Trent FM purchased naming rights for four years, becoming the Trent FM Arena Nottingham. When Trent FM was bought by Global Radio, the naming rights were assigned to Capital FM, and the arena now became known as Capital FM Arena Nottingham. In 2011, the arena installed a draping system, reducing the capacity to 4,000 for intimate shows. The arena's overall capacity was also expanded from 9,000 to 10,000.

Despite the average event ticket price rising almost £5 from the year before (to £37.22), in the 2012–13 season the arena made a £200,000 "operating deficit", with a 9% drop in attendance at the arena, and a 6% fall in the number of events held.

== Events ==
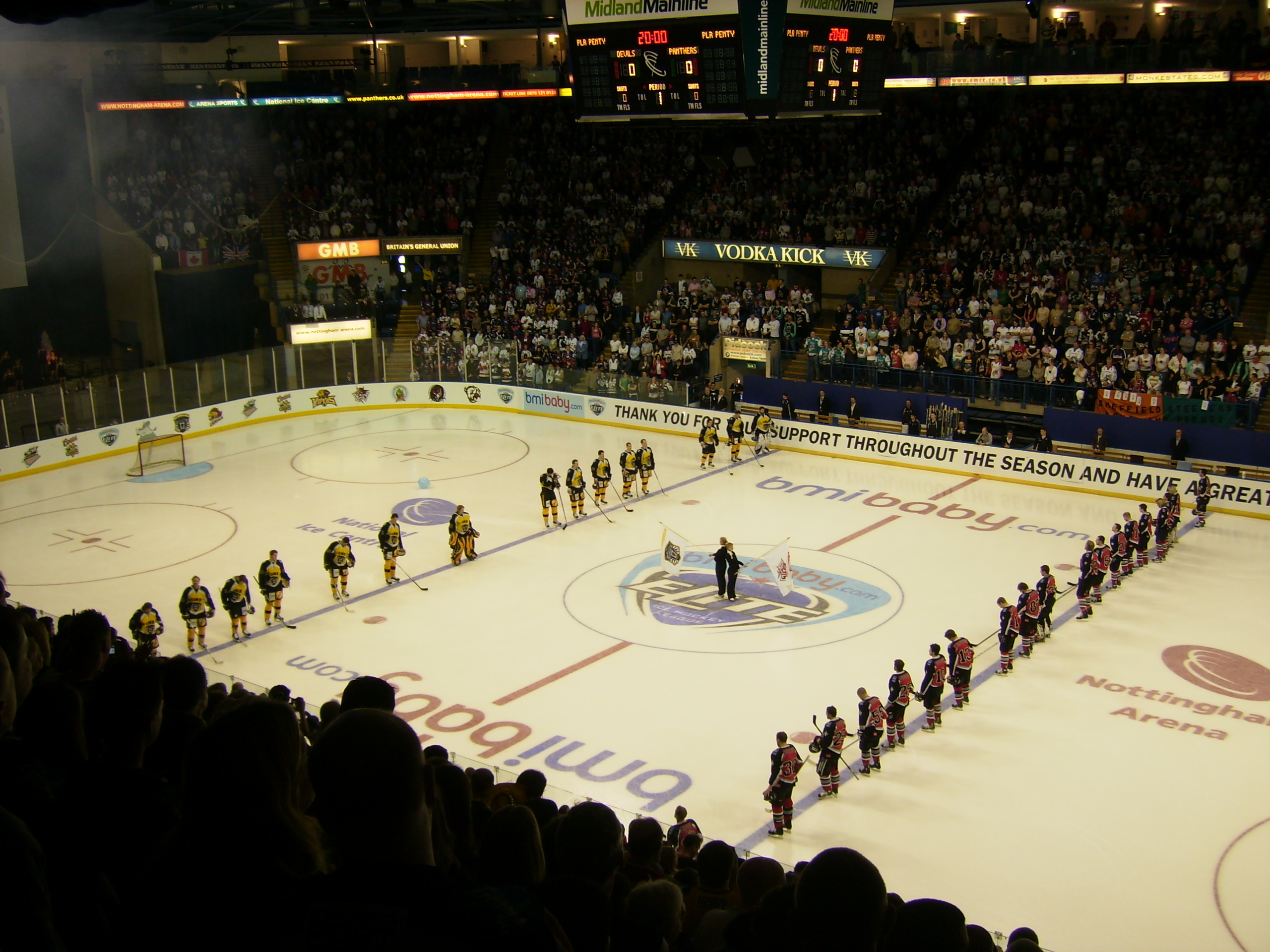
Inside the NIC Arena before the 2007 EIHL Play Off Final

The Nottingham Panthers ice hockey team plays their home games at the Arena.

Little Mix hold the record for the largest concert at the arena, with an audience of 15,685. Westlife has performed the most at the arena, with 22 shows between 2001 and 2019. As of 2014 the arena has hosted artists and events including Beyoncé, Kylie Minogue, Bruno Mars, Ed Sheeran, Katy Perry, Elton John, Lady Gaga, Dua Lipa, The 1975, One Direction, The X Factor Tour, Strictly Come Dancing Live! and We Will Rock You: 10th Anniversary Tour, as well as conferences, galas and balls, including Nottingham Trent University’s Graduation Ball. On 17 November 2012, the arena hosted the fight between Nottingham boxer Carl Froch and Yusaf Mack, with Froch retaining his IBF super-middleweight world title.

The Arena was the site of the 2023 IIHF World Championship Division I Group A ice hockey tournament. Nottingham saw Great Britain win all 5 round-robin games to be promoted back into the top division.
