= Randall Weber =

Canadian ice hockey player (born 1968)

- Born: September 2, 1968 (age 58) Fort St. John, British Columbia
- Height: 5 ft 10 in (178 cm)
- Weight: 169 lb (77 kg; 12 st 1 lb)
- Position: Centre
- Shot: Right
- Played for: Nottingham Panthers
- Playing career: 1985–2002

Randall Weber (born September 2, 1968) is a retired ice hockey centre. He moved to Nottingham in the late 1970s and made his debut for the Nottingham Panthers at the age of seventeen in 1985. He played for the Panthers for his entire professional career, breaking the club record for number of appearances and becoming the club's longest-serving player. His 845 appearances is over 200 more than second placed Chick Zamick. His number 10 jersey was retired by the Panthers following his retirement in 2002.

== Career statistics ==
| | | | Autumn Cup | | | | | Regular season | | | | | Playoffs | | | | |
| Season | Team | League | GP | G | A | Pts | PIM | GP | G | A | Pts | PIM | GP | G | A | Pts | PIM |
|---|---|---|---|---|---|---|---|---|---|---|---|---|---|---|---|---|---|
| 1985-86 | Nottingham Panthers | BHL | 9 | 0 | 6 | 6 | 2 | 30 | 4 | 5 | 9 | 17 | 4 | 1 | 0 | 1 | 2 |
| 1986-87 | Nottingham Panthers | BHL | 10 | 4 | 9 | 13 | 14 | 35 | 10 | 25 | 35 | 6 | 4 | 1 | 1 | 2 | 6 |
| 1987-88 | Nottingham Panthers | BHL | 8 | 4 | 10 | 14 | 4 | 21 | 12 | 23 | 35 | 16 | 2 | 0 | 1 | 1 | 0 |
| 1988-89 | Nottingham Panthers | BHL | 7 | 9 | 6 | 11 | 6 | 35 | 36 | 42 | 78 | 45 | 6 | 7 | 6 | 13 | 4 |
| 1989-90 | Nottingham Panthers | BHL | 8 | 11 | 12 | 23 | 2 | 32 | 19 | 27 | 46 | 30 | 5 | 2 | 5 | 7 | 6 |
| 1990-91 | Nottingham Panthers | BHL | 4 | 1 | 3 | 4 | 2 | 34 | 23 | 36 | 59 | 24 | 6 | 4 | 3 | 7 | 18 |
| 1991-92 | Nottingham Panthers | BHL | 11 | 12 | 15 | 27 | 8 | 31 | 18 | 27 | 45 | 24 | 8 | 2 | 11 | 13 | 8 |
| 1992-93 | Nottingham Panthers | BHL | 10 | 3 | 4 | 7 | 12 | 36 | 14 | 30 | 44 | 20 | 7 | 6 | 4 | 10 | 6 |
| 1993-94 | Nottingham Panthers | BHL | 4 | 3 | 2 | 5 | 2 | 33 | 16 | 34 | 50 | 40 | 7 | 4 | 4 | 8 | 16 |
| 1994-95 | Nottingham Panthers | BHL | 12 | 9 | 20 | 29 | 14 | 38 | 30 | 45 | 75 | 12 | 7 | 2 | 4 | 6 | 2 |
| 1995-96 | Nottingham Panthers | BHL | 13 | 8 | 4 | 12 | 14 | 36 | 11 | 23 | 34 | 40 | 8 | 2 | 3 | 5 | 6 |
| 1996-97 | Nottingham Panthers | ISL | 11 | 3 | 7 | 10 | 6 | 37 | 4 | 7 | 11 | 32 | 5 | 1 | 0 | 1 | 2 |
| 1997-98 | Nottingham Panthers | ISL | 12 | 1 | 2 | 3 | 4 | 27 | 3 | 5 | 8 | 8 | 6 | 0 | 2 | 2 | 0 |
| 1998-99 | Nottingham Panthers | ISL | 11 | 1 | 4 | 5 | 0 | 36 | 4 | 6 | 10 | 10 | 8 | 0 | 0 | 0 | 0 |
| 1999-00 | Nottingham Panthers | ISL | 7 | 0 | 2 | 2 | 0 | 36 | 7 | 3 | 7 | 4 | 6 | 0 | 0 | 0 | 0 |
| 2000-01 | Nottingham Panthers | ISL | 9 | 3 | 1 | 4 | 2 | 40 | 4 | 11 | 7 | 8 | 6 | 0 | 0 | 0 | 2 |
| 2001-02 | Nottingham Panthers | ISL | - | - | - | - | - | 40 | 1 | 4 | 5 | 6 | 6 | 1 | 0 | 1 | 0 |
