= Lorne Smith =

Canadian ice hockey player and coach

Lorne Smith (1928–2002) was an ice hockey player and later a coach who played defence. He was born in Port Credit, Ontario (now Mississauga). He played for the Baltimore Clippers, Moncton Hawks and Saint John Beavers before moving to the Nottingham Panthers in 1952. He appeared 421 times for the Panthers over eight seasons, scoring 85 goals, 149 assists and 234 points. He also received one first team all star selection and three second team all star selections. In 1958 he was made coach of the Panthers following the departure of Chick Zamick, leading the club until its closure in 1960.

Following the closure of the Panthers, Smith settled in Nottingham where he died in 2002.
