= Nottingham Panthers =

Ice hockey club in Nottingham, England

- City: Nottingham, England
- League: Elite Ice Hockey League
- Founded: 1946
- Home arena: Motorpoint Arena Nottingham (capacity: 7,500)
- Colours: Black, gold, white
- Owner: Neil Black
- CEO: Omar Pacha
- Head coach: Danny Stewart
- Captain: Matt Alfaro
- Affiliates: Nottingham Lions
- Website: Nottingham Panthers
Home colours	Away colours	Third colours

Franchise history
- 1946–1960: Nottingham Panthers
- 1980–present: Nottingham Panthers

The Nottingham Panthers are a British professional ice hockey club based in Nottingham, England. They are members of the Elite Ice Hockey League and play at the Motorpoint Arena.

The Nottingham Panthers have won four league titles (two English National League titles, one British National League title and one Elite Ice Hockey League title), seven Championships, six Autumn Cups and nine Challenge Cups during their history. The Panthers were the first British team to win European club honours with one Continental Cup. In 2026 they became the first British club to win the Continental Cup twice. They are the only team to have played in every season where a British league championship has been contested and are the only founding member of the Premier Division in 1983 to have continually participated in the top flight league. The Panthers have 16 members enshrined in the British Ice Hockey Hall of Fame and have had 34 players represent Great Britain at the World Championships and in Olympic qualifying.

The club was founded in 1946 after earlier attempts to establish a team were postponed due to World War II. During their first eight seasons the Panthers played in the English National League. They joined the newly formed British National League in 1954, which they competed in until its disbandment in 1960. With no league to play in the club also ceased operations. In 1980, players and officials from the Sheffield Lancers relocated to Nottingham and reformed the Panthers. Both the original and modern Nottingham Panthers played their home games at the Ice Stadium until 2000 when the team moved into the National Ice Centre.

The Nottingham Panthers have one of the largest fanbases in British ice hockey, averaging over 5,000 spectators per game during the 2014–15 season. Their supporters have shared a number of rivalries with other teams during their history. Most recently, the Panthers have had a fierce rivalry with the Sheffield Steelers. The two sides have played over 200 games, including eleven major finals, since 1992.

== History ==
=== 1946–60: Original era ===
An initial attempt to bring a professional ice hockey team to Nottingham was made in 1939 following the completion of the Ice Stadium in Nottingham City Centre. A team was assembled and brought to the United Kingdom from Canada to compete in the 1939–40 English National League season but were promptly sent home having not played a single game due to the outbreak of World War II. Seven years later, after the war had ended, a second effort to bring ice hockey to the city was begun. With a team of Canadians largely from Winnipeg, Manitoba, the Nottingham Panthers played their first competitive game on 22 November 1946 with a 3–2 home victory over the Wembley Monarchs.

The Panthers struggled during their early years and only once during their first four seasons did they finish in the upper half of the league table. The club's first coach, Alex Archer, left Nottingham after two seasons and was replaced by Archie Stinchcombe who would coach the team until 1955. Despite a lack of success in their formative years the team had a number of players who would become local heroes including forwards Les Strongman and Chick Zamick. Zamick became one of the most prolific scorers in the league and won the Nottingham Sportsman of the Year award on two occasions, defeating sportsmen such as the Notts County and England international footballer Tommy Lawton.

The club's first major title came in the 1950–51 season. After finishing fourth in the Autumn Cup the Panthers won 18 of their 30 league games and clinched the league championship. The team also ended the campaign having scored the most goals and conceded the least. The following season Nottingham lost Chick Zamick to injury and fell to the bottom of the rankings. Success returned in 1953–54 when, after a last place finish in the Autumn Cup, the Panthers secured their second English League title by one point over Streatham.

In the close season of 1954 the English League and the Scottish League were merged to form a British League. The Panthers finished second to the Harringay Racers in the eleven team competition. After one season all the Scottish teams, with the exception of the Paisley Pirates, withdrew from the British League and left it with only five members. The close season of 1955 also saw the departure of Stinchcombe who was replaced as coach by Zamick. The 1955–56 season proved to be one of the club's most successful. Nottingham won the Autumn Cup at the beginning of the season before clinching their third league title on goal average ahead of the Wembley Lions. They also travelled to Sweden where they won the Ahearne Cup.

The 1955–56 title win proved to be the original Panthers' last. Over the next four years Nottingham alternated between bottom and second place in the league standings. After finishing runner-up in 1959–60, the Panthers took part in the first British Championship final in thirty years where they faced the Brighton Tigers. Nottingham were defeated 3–2 in the first leg but won the second in regulation time by the same scoreline forcing overtime. The Tigers clinched the tie 6–5 after six minutes and 32 seconds of the extra session. During the close season of 1960 the British National League collapsed and the Nottingham Panthers were disbanded. Ice hockey would not return to Nottingham for the next two decades.

=== 1980–present: Modern era ===
==== Ice Stadium years ====
The Nottingham Panthers were revived largely thanks to the efforts of Gary Keward. In 1980 the Ice Stadium directors, led by Charles Walker, agreed to a request by Keward to give ice hockey another chance. The Sheffield Lancers, a team Keward helped to run, were relocated to Nottingham taking the name of the team that had occupied the same building 20 years earlier. On 20 September 1980 the modern Panthers took to the ice for the first time defeating the Solihull Barons 7–4 at the Ice Stadium.

During their first three seasons the Panthers played in regional leagues, first in the English League South and then in Section B of the British Hockey League. In 1983 the British Hockey League reconstituted itself into the first truly national ice hockey league for 23 years and Nottingham became one of nine founder members of the league's Premier Division. The Panthers were one of the best supported teams in the league with games regularly selling out but success on the ice eluded them as the team struggled against more established opponents such as the Durham Wasps and the Murrayfield Racers. It was not until the appointment of Alex Dampier as coach in 1985 that the team's fortunes began to change. In his first season Dampier led Nottingham to the playoffs for the first time since reforming. The Panthers lost all four of their quarter final group games and failed to advance to the finals at Wembley Arena.

In 1986 Nottingham secured their first trophy since reforming and their first overall in thirty years when they defeated the Fife Flyers 5–4 in overtime to win the Norwich Union Trophy at the NEC in Birmingham in front of a crowd of 5,600. Layton Eratt scored the winning goal after one minute and 53 seconds of the extra session in a game that had seen both the Panthers and the Flyers lead twice. In the league Nottingham again succeeded in qualifying for the playoffs but again failed to register a point. The team repeated this in the Championships the following season bringing the number of consecutive playoff defeats to twelve.

In 1988–89 the Panthers enjoyed one of their most successful seasons. They finished third in the league and were not only able to register their first win in the playoffs but also advance to the finals at Wembley for the first time. Nottingham met Whitley Warriors in the semi-final, winning the match 8–6. In the final the following day the Panthers defeated the Ayr Bruins 6–3, clinching their first Championship title. Another Autumn Cup followed in 1991 but Dampier left the club during the 1992–93 season to join the newly formed Sheffield Steelers. He was replaced by Kevin Murphy who coached the team for the remainder of the campaign. Murphy was in turn replaced by Mike Blaisdell during the close season of 1993.

Blaisdell assembled a strong team for the 1994–95 season and led the Panthers to the Benson & Hedges Cup with a 7–2 victory over the Cardiff Devils in the final. Nottingham opened their league campaign with a 21-game unbeaten run but four defeats over the final two weekends of the regular season, including an 8–6 home defeat by nearest rivals and eventual champions Sheffield, denied the club their first league championship in 39 years. During the 1995–96 season the Panthers made it to both the Benson & Hedges Cup and playoff finals, but they were defeated on each occasion by the Steelers.

In 1996 the Panthers became a founder member of the new Ice Hockey Superleague. The new league abolished the wage cap and restrictions on the number of non-British trained players a club was allowed. Many of Nottingham's British players, who had risen through the ranks of the club's youth development system, were dropped in favour of North American imports. Of Nottingham's locally trained contingent only Randall Weber, Ashley Tait and Simon Hunt were retained. The Panthers began the season by qualifying for the Benson & Hedges Cup final for a third straight year following a 6–3 aggregate victory over archrival Sheffield at the semi-final stage. In the final they defeated the Ayr Scottish Eagles 5–3, taking the lead 29 seconds into the game and never relinquishing it. The Panthers finished fourth in the league and qualified for the last four in the playoffs after finishing top of their group with five wins and one overtime loss from six games. Their semi final against the Ayr Scottish Eagles became the longest game in British ice hockey history. The scores were level at 5–5 after regulation time and each of the following five periods of ten-minute overtime ended goalless. Only in the sixth period of overtime, with the two-hour mark of the match nearing, did Jeff Hoad finally score a shorthanded winner for Nottingham ending the game after 115 minutes and 49 seconds. In the final the Panthers met Sheffield where they were defeated 3–1 after taking an early lead.

In 1997 the Panthers franchise was sold after directors revealed the club was in considerable debt. A buyer was found in London based businessman Neil Black and his sports management company. The 1998–99 season saw the Panthers sign one of their strongest ever line-ups. After finishing third in their Benson & Hedges Cup group, the Panthers eliminated the Slough Jets and Newcastle Riverkings before defeating the Manchester Storm in the semi-final despite being depleted by injuries and facing a full strength Storm side. The final saw the Panthers taking on the Ayr Scottish Eagles in a repeat of the 1996 final. Here Nottingham came from behind to defeat the Eagles 2–1 with Finn Pekka Virta scoring both goals. In the league the Panthers finished in third place, twelve points behind champions Manchester. Nottingham also qualified for the finals of the Challenge Cup and the playoffs but the team were defeated by the Sheffield Steelers and Cardiff Devils respectively. During the course of the season Paul Adey and Greg Hadden scored 141 points between them, four players scored more than 20 goals, six players earned more than 30 assists and seven players achieved 30 or more points.

The 1999–00 season was the club's final year at the Ice Stadium before moving to the National Ice Centre. The budget for players was limited by the club chairman so that the Panthers would be able to break even the following season. Players were asked to take a wage cut, leading to the departure of Trevor Robins, Mike Bishop, Mark Kolesar, Eric Dubios and record goalscorer Paul Adey. This frustrated Mike Blaisdell who left the club in November to become head coach of the Sheffield Steelers. He was replaced by former coach Alex Dampier. Lacking the spending power of many of their rivals, Nottingham finished sixth in the eight team league. The club fared better in the Challenge Cup where it made the final for the second successive year but the team was defeated 2–1 at London Arena by Mike Blaisdell's Steelers. On 22 March 2000 the Panthers hosted Newcastle in their final game at the Ice Stadium. Jamie Leach scored Nottingham's last goal at their home of 54 years but the club was defeated 2–1 in overtime.

==== Move to the National Ice Centre ====
The Panthers moved to the new National Ice Centre in September 2000 but endured a terrible first season in their new home. They were knocked out at the semi-final stage of the Benson & Hedges Cup by the Steelers and suffered a dire first half to the regular season. By Christmas the team faced the prospect of not qualifying for the playoffs for the first time since 1985. Form improved during the second half of the season with the team winning five of their first seven home games during 2001, including a 6–4 victory over the Sheffield Steelers marred by a violent bench clearing brawl. The Panthers still lay in ninth and last place going into their final game of the regular season, three points behind their opponents Newcastle Jesters. Nottingham required a regulation time win to claim the eighth and final playoff berth, something they had not done away from their home ice all season. The Jesters needed only to tie. With 10.1 seconds to go, the game was locked at 2–2, but with an extra attacker the Panthers won a faceoff next to the Newcastle goal and Robert Nordmark scored with 4.4 seconds remaining to take them into the playoffs and eliminate the Jesters. In the playoffs a 5–0 win over a financially troubled Sheffield Steelers was their only victory of the post season.

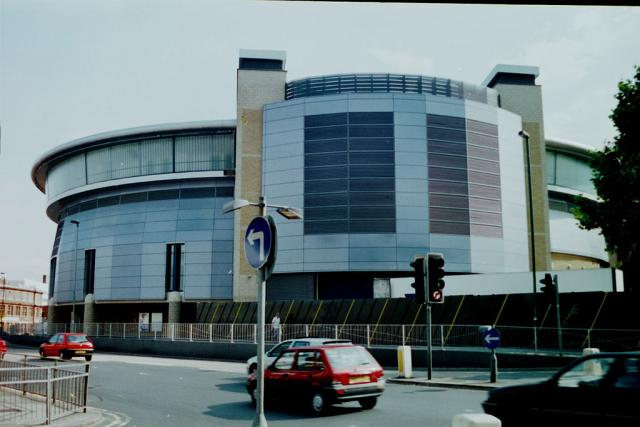
The National Ice Centre seen in 2001

In 2003 the Superleague collapsed after financial problems; it was left with only five members and faced the prospect of having only three. After uncertainty over which league the Panthers would be taking part in and even uncertainty over the future of the club itself, Nottingham became a founding member of the new Elite Ice Hockey League. Changes to the rules regarding the number of non-British trained players a club was allowed to sign saw the Panthers make substantial changes to their squad. After finishing second in the league, their highest finish in twelve years, Panthers qualified for the Challenge Cup final. Their opponent in the two-legged final was archrival Sheffield Steelers, a team that Nottingham had failed to beat in each of the six finals the two club's had contested. The first leg ended in a 1–1 tie in Nottingham. In the second leg at Sheffield Arena the Panthers raced to an early 3–1 aggregate lead. However, Sheffield pulled a goal back late in the second period and equalised with ten minutes remaining, forcing overtime. After 53 seconds of the extra session Kim Ahlroos scored the winning goal, ending an eight-year wait for the Panthers to beat the Steelers in a showpiece final and securing the club's first silverware since 1998. The Panthers followed up their trophy win with a strong playoff campaign, but after a 6–1 win over the Manchester Phoenix in the semi-final, the Steelers avenged their Challenge Cup defeat with a narrow 2–1 win in the final.

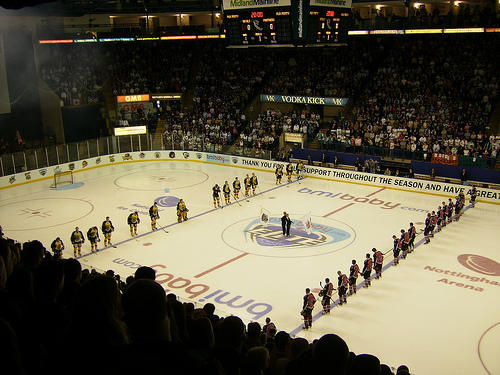
Nottingham and Cardiff line up prior to the 2007 playoff final

The 2004–05 season saw the club take part in the Continental Cup. The Panthers were placed into a group with host team Gothiques d'Amiens, Italian side Milano Vipers and Slovenian side Olimpija Ljubljana. Nottingham tied their first game against Milan before recording 1–0 and 3–1 victories over the Slovenians and French, narrowly missing out on a place in the second round of the competition due to Milan's better goal difference. Domestically the team struggled for much of season and only during the end of season playoffs did the Panthers replicate the form they showed in Europe where, despite being depleted by injuries, they qualified for a second successive playoff final, losing 2–1 in overtime to eventual Grand Slam winners Coventry Blaze.

Mike Blaisdell briefly returned to the club as coach for the 2005–06 season, before being succeeded by Mike Ellis. Ellis made numerous changes to the playing staff and led the Panthers to a fifth place league finish. In the playoffs Nottingham eliminated the Sheffield Steelers and Belfast Giants before defeating the Cardiff Devils to clinch their first playoff title in 18 years. All three ties were decided on penalty shots with goaltender Rastislav Rovnianek saving all seven shots he faced during the course of the competition. The following season the Panthers won a second Challenge Cup title, defeating the Sheffield Steelers 9–7 on aggregate in the final. This was the first time that the Panthers had won major honours in successive seasons.

==== The Corey Neilson era ====
Coach Mike Ellis departed the club following the 2007–08 season, to be replaced by Corey Neilson. After a third-place finish in the 2008–09 season, the Panthers mounted a title challenge during 2009–10, remaining in contention for the championship until the final stages of the season. They eventually finished third for a third successive season. The Panthers also won the Challenge Cup for the second time in three seasons, defeating the Cardiff Devils 8–7 on aggregate in the final. The 2010–11 season started strongly, but the Panthers suffered a poor mid season run which scuppered their chances of winning the regular season title and led to players being fined a proportion of their wages. The team were able to rebound from this, first securing a 4–3 aggregate victory over the Belfast Giants to successfully defend the Challenge Cup, then securing their third playoff championship with a 5–4 win over the Cardiff Devils. The Panthers repeated the double in the 2011–12 season first winning a third straight Challenge Cup with a 10–4 aggregate victory over Belfast. In the playoffs, the Panthers defeated Braehead and Hull in the playoffs before winning 2–0 against Cardiff in the final. The game was a tight affair, with David-Alexandre Beauregard breaking the deadlock after 53 goalless minutes.

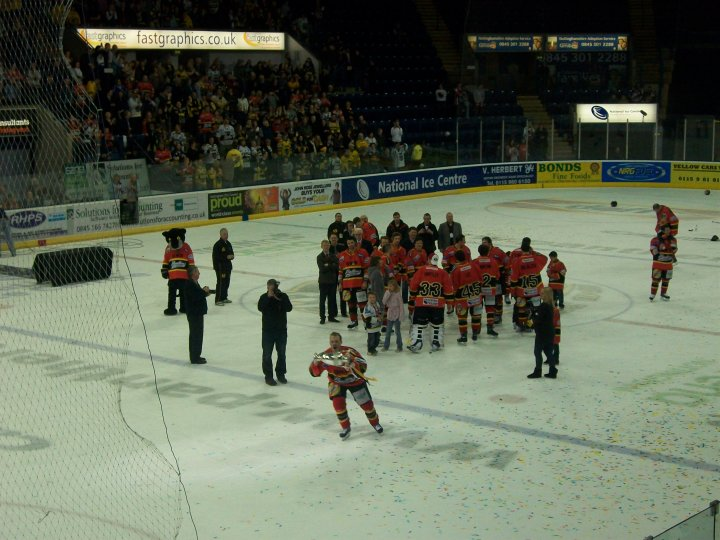
The Panthers win the 2010 Challenge Cup, the first of nine titles won over the next 5 seasons.

The 2012 off-season began with the release of captain Danny Meyers and his replacement by fellow Great Britain international Jonathan Weaver. Other new additions included forwards David Ling, Patrick Galivan and Bruce Graham, while Jason Beckett and Eric Werner were brought in as new defencemen. The season began with the Panthers losing 2 of their first 4 home games. This prompted Neilson to re-sign defenceman Guillaume Lepine as well as Anthony Stewart, then of the Carolina Hurricanes, on a short-term deal due to the NHL lockout. Form began to improve and, following a shootout win in Cardiff on 8 December, Panthers went top of the league standings. They remained there for the rest of the season, clinching their first regular season title in 57 years on 15 March 2013. Patrick Galivan scored the championship-sealing goal late in the third period before Matt Francis added an empty-netter in a 5–3 victory over the Belfast Giants. Five days later the Panthers defeated Sheffield 4–1 in the first leg of the Challenge Cup final. This proved decisive, and a 2–1 defeat in the second leg was not enough to deny the Panthers a fourth consecutive Challenge Cup title. Nottingham went on to face Belfast in the playoff final. The Panthers opened a 2–0 lead before the Giants rallied to tie the game and force overtime. On the powerplay in the extra session, captain Jordan Fox scored to give Panthers the win and complete the Grand Slam.

By contrast, the 2013–14 season was plagued by injuries, suspensions and a high turnover of players, and the Panthers fell to fourth in the final league table. They once again reached the Challenge Cup final, but were considered outsiders against a Belfast Giants team that comfortably won the league championship and finished 32 points ahead of Nottingham. The Panthers lost the first leg 5–2, a result that left the Giants as strong favourites to lift the cup. However, the Panthers won the second leg 4–1 to level the tie and force overtime. When that finished goalless, goaltender Craig Kowalski saved all three Belfast penalty shots and Petr Kalus scored to give Panthers a 7–6 aggregate victory and a fifth consecutive Challenge Cup.

Although a third playoff and Challenge Cup double followed in 2015–16, the remainder of Neilson's tenure was highlighted by the club's performances in European competition. The club entered the Champions Hockey League in its inaugural season, and, although they were eliminated in the group stage, they did secure a 3–1 victory over the Hamburg Freezers. Two seasons later, the Panthers entered the 2016–17 edition of the Continental Cup. After navigating their way through the first two rounds, the club participated in the final tournament in Ritten, where they won all three of their matches and became the first British team to win a major European tournament. Their victory earned them a place in the 2017–18 Champions Hockey League. Though they were seeded last in the competition, the Panthers produced a major upset by winning four of their six group matches, including a 4–2 win over the fourth-seed SC Bern, to qualify for the tournament's knockout stage. They were eliminated in the round of sixteen with a 6–1 aggregate defeat to the ZSC Lions.

==== Life after Neilson: Chernomaz to Wallace ====
After the departure of Corey Neilson in 2018 the Panthers turned to Rich Chernomaz as their new head coach, but he would be replaced before the end of the 2018-19 EIHL season.

In 2019, the club appointed former player Gui Doucet as Director of Hockey and his first move was to hire former NHLer Tim Wallace as head coach. Wallace had served as player-coach at Milton Keynes Lightning during the 2018–19 season.

The 2019-20 EIHL season prematurely ended in March 2020, without the league campaign being played to its conclusion, due to the coronavirus pandemic. Only the Challenge Cup final was contested, with the subsequent play-offs also cancelled.

On 15 September 2020, the Elite League announced the suspension of the 2020–21 season. The league said restrictions on social distancing and no crowds at sporting venues made the league season non-viable. The season was cancelled completely in February 2021.

On 3 March 2021, Nottingham were announced as one of four Elite League teams taking part in the 'Elite Series' between April–May 2021, a total of 24 games culminating in a best-of-three play-off final series. Panthers won the tournament on 2 May 2021 courtesy of a 2–0 series win over the Sheffield Steelers, winning game one 5–3 and game two 5–2.

On 5 January 2022, Nottingham parted company with head coach Tim Wallace following a poor run of form that saw the club slip to sixth in the Elite League standings with a 9–10 record. Player/Assistant coach Mark Matheson and captain Stephen Lee were placed in interim charge. The decision to move on from Wallace came just over a week after the passing of Panthers GM Gary Moran.

David Whistle, most recently head coach of Leeds Knights, later joined the interim coaching staff until the end of the season.

==== Pacha arrives as CEO; coaching changes ====
In May 2022, Nottingham announced they had parted ways with Director of Hockey Gui Doucet after three years in the role. The club subsequently appointed former Dundee Stars head coach and general manager Omar Pacha into a newly created role of chief executive officer.

The same month, Pacha's first move of note was to name American Gary Graham as the new Nottingham Panthers head coach. Graham arrived having most recently coached USHL side Omaha Lancers. He was also previously the coach of Pensacola Ice Flyers and Fort Wayne Komets.

However, Nottingham parted company with Graham in November 2022. The team sat sixth in the standings with a 6–8–1 record but had failed to deliver consistent results under Graham's leadership. The Panthers then announced that Corey Neilson had returned as head coach until the end of the 2022–23 season. Neilson had previously played with Nottingham from 2006 to 2013 and coached the team from 2008 to 2018.

Nottingham finished the 2022–23 season in 7th place with 47 points and a 21–28–5 record from 54 games, after which Neilson stepped down as head coach to take up an opportunity elsewhere in Europe.

In April 2023, Nottingham confirmed the arrival of Frenchman Jonathan Paredes as the club's new head coach from the 2023–24 season. Paredes arrived from French Ligue Magnus side Jokers de Cergy-Pontoise, who he had coached for six years and taken from the French second tier to the upper reaches of the French top division.

On 28 October 2023, during a Challenge Cup game against the Sheffield Steelers, Panthers forward Adam Johnson was fatally injured after an on-ice collision resulted in his throat being slashed by Steelers defenceman Matt Petgrave's skate. Immediately following the incident, the game was abandoned and medical personnel attempted to save Johnson's life, but to no avail. The incident is currently under police investigation.

Following the incident the Panthers would sign free agent Simon Després, Austin Farley from HC Nove Zamky and young English defender Joseph Hazeldine from the Fehérvár Hockey Academy 19. On 20 November 2023, Swedish defender Viktor Björkung departed the club for HK Spišská Nová Ves.

On 8 November 2023, the Panthers announced that they were withdrawing from the 2023–24 Challenge cup competition. On 26 November 2023, Panthers returned to playing with a 2–4 loss to the Belfast Giants but won their second game back 4–2 against the Cardiff Devils. The Panthers would earn a record of 14–24–8 following the incident.

Nottingham finished the 2023–24 season in 9th narrowly missing the playoffs by 1 point. Their final game of the season was a 3–2 overtime win against the Manchester Storm, however the Fife Flyers and Coventry Blaze winning their final regular season games meant the Panthers would not make the playoffs for the first time in the EIHL era. After the season the club confirmed Paredes would leave after one season in charge, to take up a job in Europe.

==== Danny Stewart era ====
On 30 April 2024, the Panthers announced the signing of new head coach Danny Stewart, who joined from the Coventry Blaze after eight seasons with the club. On 3 May 2024, Panthers assistant coach Kevin Moore departed to replace Stewart as head coach at the Coventry Blaze.

The Panthers were mathematically in with a shot at the league title heading into the final weekend of the 2024–25 season, as Stewart led Nottingham to their best league finish in years. They ultimately finished 3rd behind Sheffield and six points behind eventual champions Belfast. Panthers went on to win the playoffs, first defeating Sheffield 4–3 in overtime in the semi-finals and then in the final overcoming Cardiff by the same score, this time in double overtime, to lift their first domestic trophy since 2016.

Nottingham then went on to win the IIHF Continental Cup for the second time in team history. The Panthers beat Torpedo from Kazakhstan 4-2 in the Gold Medal Game on 17 January 2026. In March 2026, Nottingham won the Challenge Cup for a ninth time (and first since 2016) beating Coventry Blaze 3-2 in overtime. The Panthers title hopes would come to an end in late March 2026 following a 4-2 road defeat to the Belfast Giants

== Name origins, logos and colours ==
The origin of the name Panthers is uncertain. One of the most widely known theories is that the club were named for a squadron of Canadian airmen based near Nottingham during World War II. However, there is no evidence to suggest that such a squadron existed and records indicate that the name was coined before these events could have taken place. A souvenir brochure produced to mark of the opening of the Ice Stadium in April 1939 stated that the venue's new team would be known as the Nottingham Panthers. It does not, however, explain the rationale behind the name. Three games were played by teams using the name Nottingham Panthers during the winter of 1939–40 before the name was revived in 1946.

During the original era the Panthers did not have a logo, instead using stylised lettering on the front of their shirts. The club's current logo was adopted in 2003 and is the fifth to be used since the Panthers were reformed. The first was used between 1980 and 1994 and was the silhouette of a Panthers' head in a red circle. The second logo, adopted in 1994, was similar to the first but used a more detailed Panthers' head. The third logo, introduced in 1998, featured a keyhole shaped like the head of a cat with a Panther reaching through it. The fourth logo was adopted following the move to the National Ice Centre and was similar to the logo of German side Augsburger Panther. The stylised lettering used during the original era was used again on special shirts made to mark the sixtieth anniversary of the club in 2006.

The colours used by the original Panthers were black and white. Home shirts were black with a black and white striped lining on the shoulders. When the club reformed in 1980, the black and white colours were also revived, with a gold lining also being added to the jerseys. In 1996 red was added to the colour scheme of the shirts. In 2001–02 the club's colour scheme was changed to black and gold. Home jerseys are gold with a black lining with away jerseys being the reverse. In 2007–08, the Panthers brought out a predominantly white third jersey for the Challenge Cup.

The Swedish 2nd tier (Hockeyallsvenskan) club IK Pantern (The Panther Sports Club) from Malmö who have participated on two occasions in the promotion qualifiers to Sweden's top flight, were named after Nottingham Panthers. It was founded in 1959, by young car mechanic workers who were fans of Nottingham Panthers after a tour in Scania, where the English team impressed the Scanian boys.

In July 2024, the Panthers unveiled refreshed primary logos ahead of the 2024–25 season. In a similar style to the NHL's Florida Panthers, Nottingham's home shirt would feature the word 'Panthers' on the crest. The away shirt would have the name 'Nottingham' above the logo.

== Stadiums ==
The original home of the Panthers was the Ice Stadium. Built by Sims, Sons and Cooke Ltd, the Ice Stadium was based on the Harringay Arena design and officially opened on 10 April 1939. The building hosted its first game two days later with the Harringay Greyhounds defeating the Harringay Racers 10–6 in a challenge game in front of a crowd of 5,000 spectators. Though a team playing under the name Nottingham Panthers would play three games during the winter of 1939–40, it would be 1946 before the venue would host a competitive match. During World War II the Ice Stadium served as a makeshift munitions store and morgue. The building reopened on 31 August 1946 and hosted another game between the Greyhounds and Racers before the Panthers made their competitive debut on 22 November, defeating the Wembley Monarchs 3–2. The venue became the home of the team between 1946 and 1960 and again from the club's reformation in 1980 to 2000.

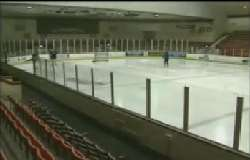
Nottingham Ice Stadium

The Ice Stadium held a capacity of 2,950 spectators and had an ice pad measuring 185 feet (56 m) by 85 feet (26 m). After the club's reformation a second ice pad was installed in 1983. In October 1996 plans were announced by Nottingham City Council to replace the ageing building with a twin-rinked National Ice Centre. Work began on the 6,500 capacity arena section of the facility in the summer of 1998 and was completed in the spring of 2000. The Panthers played their final game at the Ice Stadium on 22 March 2000. After the game supporters were allowed to dismantle anything easily removable from the interior of the building to take home as souvenirs. The Ice Stadium was demolished soon afterwards to allow for the completion of the new Ice Centre.

The new National Ice Centre was designed by Nottingham City Council officials and was built by John Laing plc. The building cost £40 million to construct, of which £22.5 million was awarded by the National Lottery. The arena half of the facility was opened on 1 April 2000, with the second public skating pad opening a year later. Both rinks are Olympic sized ice pads measuring 196 feet (60 m) by 97 feet (30 m). The Panthers played their first game at their new home on 2 September 2000 when the team hosted the London Knights in the Benson & Hedges Cup. Barry Nieckar scored the club's first goal in a 2–1 Panthers victory played to a crowd of 4,800.

== Honours ==
Nottingham's first trophy was the English National League regular season title, which it won in 1950–51. The first trophy of the modern era (beginning with the club's reformation in 1980) was the Autumn Cup, won in 1986–87. The original club won four major honours (3 regular season titles and 1 Autumn Cup) in 14 seasons, whereas the modern Panthers have secured 22 trophies in 39 seasons (2 Continental Cups, 1 regular season title, 6 playoff championships, 8 Challenge Cups and 5 Autumn Cups).

=== Domestic ===
League Championships

- 1950–51, 1953–54, 1955–56, 2012–13

Playoff Championships

- 1988–89, 2006–07, 2010–11, 2011–12, 2012–13, 2015–16, 2024–25

Autumn Cups

- 1955–56, 1986–87, 1991–92, 1994–95, 1996–97, 1998–99

Challenge Cups

- 2003–04, 2007–08, 2009–10, 2010–11, 2011–12, 2012–13, 2013–14, 2015–16, 2025–26

=== European ===
IIHF Continental Cup

- 2016–17, 2025–26

=== Individual ===
EIHL All-Stars First Team

- 2006–07: Jan Krajíček
- 2007–08: Sean McAslan
- 2009–10: Jade Galbraith
- 2011–12: Corey Neilson
- 2012–13: Craig Kowalski, David Ling
- 2015–16: Juraj Kolnik
- 2019–20: Mark Matheson, Sam Herr
- 2025–26: Tim Doherty

EIHL All-Stars Second Team

- 2004–05: Carl Carlsson
- 2006–07: Rastislav Rovnianek, Sean McAslan
- 2007–08: Tom Askey, Corey Neilson
- 2008–09: Corey Neilson
- 2009–10: Corey Neilson
- 2010–11: Corey Neilson
- 2011–12: Craig Kowalski, Jordan Fox, David-Alexandre Beauregard
- 2012–13: Eric Werner, Bruce Graham
- 2024–25: Jason Grande

== Records and statistics ==
Randall Weber holds the record for Nottingham Panthers appearances, having played for the club 845 times between 1985 and 2002. Centre Chick Zamick comes second, having appeared 624 times between 1947 and 1958.

Canadian forward Paul Adey is the club's all-time leader in goals, assists and points. He scored 828 goals and 781 assists for a total of 1,609 points in 609 appearances between 1988 and 1999. Zamick is in second place having scored 774 goals and 638 assists for 1412 points. He is the only other player to have amassed more than 1,000 points for the Panthers. Adey also holds the record for the most goals scored by a Panthers player in a single season with 120 during the 1994–95 season. During the same season Rick Brebant set club records for the most assists and most points in a single season with 156 and 241 respectively.

British forward Simon Hunt holds the club record for the most penalty minutes, serving 1,226 minutes in 524 appearances between 1988 and 1999. During 2000–01 Barry Nieckar earned 352 penalty minutes, the highest number for a player in a single season.

The club's record win came on 31 October 1981 when the Panthers defeated the Southampton Vikings 31–2 at the Ice Stadium. A few weeks earlier, on 4 October, the Panthers had recorded their record away victory with a 23–1 win over the same opposition. The team's heaviest defeat came on 20 March 1988 with a 23–1 away defeat at the Whitley Warriors. Nottingham's largest home defeat was a 14–2 loss to the Dundee Rockets on 25 February 1984.

The Nottingham Panthers have held continuous membership of British ice hockey's highest division since the foundation of the Premier League in 1983 and are the only team to have this distinction. The club are one of the oldest in the Elite Ice Hockey League having been founded eight years after the Fife Flyers, but forty years before the Cardiff Devils.

On 29 December 2011, forward David Clarke became the leading goalscorer in Elite Ice Hockey League history. Clarke scored his 230th goal in all competitions to pass Adam Calder.

In the same game, another milestone was set as David-Alexandre Beauregard reached his 1,000th career point.

On 9 March 2014, David Clarke registered his 600th EIHL point in his career and, in the same game, Corey Neilson also became Nottingham Panthers most successful coach, overtaking Mike Blaisdell.

On 17 January 2026 the Panthers became the first British club to win the Continental Cup twice.

== Current squad ==
Squad for 2026–27 Elite League season

- * Denotes two-way deal with Peterborough Phantoms of the NIHL

Netminders
No.		Player	Catches	Acquired	Place of Birth	Joined from	Press Release
20	(Canada) (United Kingdom)	Mat Robson	L	2026	Mississauga, Canada	Coventry Blaze, EIHL
27	(Canada)	Kai Edmonds	L	2026	Ottawa, Canada	Toronto Metro Univ, U Sports
33	(England)	Luca Sheldon	L	2022	Nottingham, England	Nottingham Lions, NIHL 1

Defencemen
No.		Player	Shoots	Acquired	Place of Birth	Joined from	Press Release
2	(Canada)	Darick Louis-Jean	L	2026	Montreal, Canada	Trois-Rivières Lions, ECHL
4	(Canada)	Gordie Ballhorn	L	2026	Wetaskiwin, Canada	Esbjerg Energy, Metal Ligaen
13	(England)	Henry Newell*	R	2026	Nottingham, England	Kalix HC J20, U20 Region
26	(Finland)	Jaakko Niskala	R	2026	Rovaniemi, Finland	Nikkō Ice Bucks, ALIH
29	(Canada)	Aiden Hansen-Bukata	L	2026	Vancouver, Canada	Utah Grizzlies, ECHL
70	(Hungary)	Zsombor Garát A	L	2024	Budapest, Hungary	Worcester Railers, ECHL
73	(England) (United Kingdom)	Joseph Hazeldine	L	2026	Nottingham, England	Glasgow Clan, EIHL

Forwards
No.		Player	Position	Acquired	Place of Birth	Joined from	Press Release
8	(United States)	Spencer Naas	LW/C	2026	St. Louis Park, United States	Dundee Stars, EIHL
9	(England) (Canada)	Patrick Larkin	C/D	2026	Swindon, England	McGill Univ, U Sports
12	(Canada) (United States)	Chase Pearson	C/LW	2025	Cornwall, Canada	EC VSV, IceHL
14	(England)	Jordan Kelsall	C	2017	Nottingham, England	Swindon Wildcats, NIHL
17	(United States)	Tim Doherty A	C/LW	2024	Portsmouth, United States	SG Cortina, AlpsHL
21	(Canada)	Matt Alfaro C	C	2024	Calgary, Canada	Ravensburg Towerstars, DEL2
23	(Canada)	Brandon Frattaroli	C/RW	2026	Pierrefonds, Canada	IF Troja-Ljungby, HockeyAllsvenskan
61	(Finland)	Miikka Pitkänen	C/LW	2026	Kuopio, Finland	Nybro Vikings, HockeyAllsvenskan
74	(England) (United Kingdom)	Ollie Betteridge A	RW	2023	Nottingham, England	Ferencvárosi TC, Erste Liga
83	(United States)	Brendan Harris	C/LW	2026	Port Jefferson, United States	Orlando Solar Bears, ECHL
84	(Canada)	Benjamin Corbeil	RW	2026	Granby, Canada	Eispiraten Crimmitschau, DEL2
89	(Canada)	Zach O'Brien	C/RW	2026	St. John's, Canada	Storhamar, EHL
91	(Canada)	Max Grondin	C/LW	2026	Hearst, Canada	Norfolk Admirals, ECHL

Team staff
	Name	Position	Place of Birth	Joined from	Press Release
(Canada)	Danny Stewart	Head coach	Fort McMurray, Canada	Coventry Blaze, EIHL
(England)	Linton Grant	Assistant coach	Birmingham, England	Okotoks Oilers, BCHL
(Canada)	Omar Pacha	Chief Executive Officer	Boucherville, Canada	Dundee Stars, EIHL
(England)	Adam Goodridge	Chief Operations Officer	Nottingham, England	No Team
(England)	Mitchell Bowler	Equipment manager	England

Recent departures
No.		Player	Position	Acquired	Leaving For	Press Release
7	(United States)	Cooper Zech	D	2024	Toledo Walleye, ECHL
8	(Canada)	Matt Marcinew	C/RW	2025	EC Bad Nauheim, DEL2
9	(Canada)	Jarod Hilderman	D	2025	Boxers de Bordeaux, Ligue Magnus
16	(United States)	Bryan Lemos	RW/C	2025	Lausitzer Füchse, DEL2
18	(United States)	Mitchell Fossier A	LW	2024	Retired
19	(Canada)	Ross Armour	C/RW	2025	Glasgow Clan, EIHL
23	(England)	Bradley Bowering	D	2024	Peterborough Phantoms, NIHL
24	(Canada)	Matt Spencer	D	2024	Glasgow Clan, EIHL
25	(England) (United Kingdom)	Josh Tetlow A	D	2023	Retired
27	(England)	Finlay Ulrick	RW/C	2025	Hull Seahawks, NIHL
28	(Canada)	David Noël	D	2025	Brûleurs de Loups, Ligue Magnus
30	(United States)	Jason Grande	G	2024	Anglet Hormadi Élite, Ligue Magnus
37	(Canada)	Kevin Carr	G	2025	Retired
44	(England)	Oliver Endicott	C/LW	2024	Leeds Knights, NIHL
55	(England)	Milique Martelly	D	2025	Milton Keynes Lightning, NIHL
61	(England)	Alex Rushby	F	2025	Hull Seahawks, NIHL
64	(Canada)	Nolan Volcan	LW	2025	Jokers de Cergy-Pontoise, Ligue Magnus
92	(Sweden)	Jakob Stridsberg	D	2025	Tilburg Trappers, Oberliga
98	(Sweden)	Didrik Henbrant	RW/C	2023	Odense Bulldogs, Metal Ligaen

== Honoured members ==
The Panthers have retired the numbers of seven players since reforming. The number 3 of defenceman Gary Rippingale was retired following his death at the age of eighteen in 1992. Randall Weber, who spent his entire seventeen-year career at the Panthers, had his number 10 retired following his final game for the club in 2002. The number 11 of forward Greg Hadden and the number 22 of the club's all-time leading goal, assist and point scorer Paul Adey were retired in 2003. The number 77 of defenceman and head coach Corey Neilson was retired in 2013 on the same night the club were presented with their first league championship trophy since 1956. Upon the announcement of his retirement at the end of the 2017–2018 season, the club announced David Clarke’s number 5 would be retired during the 2018–19 season. On 18 November 2023, it was announced that the Panthers will retire the number 47, following the death of Adam Johnson. On 15 December 2024, a ceremony took place before the game against Fife Flyers, where Johnson’s number was formally retired.

On Wednesday 9 November 2022, Nottingham Panthers CEO Omar Pacha confirmed the club would be hanging up the six retired jerseys above the stage end of the ice at the National Ice Centre. The banner depicting the jerseys was unveiled at the game on 12 November 2022 against Belfast Giants.

Sixteen people who have been associated with the Panthers are members of British ice hockey's Hall of Fame. As a member of the Great Britain team that won gold at the 1936 Winter Olympics, Panthers coach Archie Stinchcombe was inducted in 1951. The club's first coach, Alex Archer was posthumously elected to the Hall of Fame as a member of the Olympic winning team in 1993. Forward Chick Zamick, who played for the Panthers between 1947 and 1958 and holds the original club's records for most goals and most appearances, was inducted into the Hall of Fame in 1951 while fellow forward and teammate Les Strongman who went on to serve as the modern club's coach, secretary and as a club director was inducted in 1987. Coaches Alex Dampier and Mike Blaisdell were inducted in 1995 and 2004 respectively while Paul Adey was inducted in 2006. Former players George Beach, Rick Brebant, Johnny Carlyle, Stephen Cooper, Jack Dryburgh, Art Hodgins, Chris Kelland, Jimmy Spence and Mike Urquhart are also members of the Hall of Fame. Zamick is the only person associated with the Nottingham Panthers to have membership of another Hall of Fame, having been inducted into the Manitoba Hockey Hall of Fame in 1995.

== Leaders ==
=== Head coaches ===
- Alex Archer, 1946–48
- Archie Stinchcombe, 1948–55
- Chick Zamick, 1955–58
- Lorne Smith, 1958–60
- Les Strongman, 1980–82
- Terry Gudziunas, 1982–83
- Mike Urquhart, 1983–85
- Alex Dampier, 1985–93
- Kevin Murphy, 1993
- Mike Blaisdell, 1993–99
- Alex Dampier, 1999–02†
- Paul Adey, 2002–05
- Mike Blaisdell, 2005–06
- Mike Ellis, 2006–08
- Corey Neilson, 2008–18
- Rich Chernomaz, 2018–19
- Rick Strachan, 2019 (interim)
- Tim Wallace, 2019–22
- Mark Matheson, David Whistle & Stephen Lee, 2022 (interim)
- Gary Graham, 2022
- Corey Neilson, 2022–23
- Jonathan Paredes, 2023–24
- Danny Stewart, 2024–

†Dampier was Director of Hockey between 2000 and 2002. Coaching during this period was overseen by Peter Woods (2000–01) and Paul Adey (2001–02), however overall responsibility for the team remained with Dampier.

=== Team captains ===
- Reg Howard, 1947–48
- Ed Young, 1948–49
- Ken Westman, 1948–50
- Les Strongman, 1950–55
- Lorne Smith, 1955–56
- Ken Westman, 1957–58
- Les Strongman, 1958–59
- Dwayne Keward, 1980–81
- Daryl Easson, 1981–82
- Mike Urquhart, 1982–83
- Gavin Fraser, 1983–84
- Greg McDonald, 1983–84
- Jeff Andison, Robin Andrew, 1984–85
- Gavin Fraser, 1985–87
- Terry Kurtenbach, 1986–93
- Andre Malo, 1993–94
- Paul Adey, 1993–94
- Ross Lambert, 1993–94
- Rick Brebant, 1994–95
- Garth Premak, 1995–98
- Jamie Leach, 1998–01
- Joel Poirier, 2001–02
- John Purves, 2002–03
- Briane Thompson, 2003–04
- Calle Carlsson, 2004–06
- David Clarke, 2006–07
- Sean McAslan, 2007–08
- Danny Meyers, 2008–12
- Jordan Fox, 2012–13
- David Clarke, 2013–16
- Brad Moran, 2016–17
- Stephen Lee, 2017–18
- Gui Lepine, 2018–19
- Sam Herr, 2019–20
- Stephen Lee, 2021–22
- Matthew Myers, 2022–23
- Mike Caruso, 2023–24
- Sam Herr, 2024–25
- Matt Alfaro, 2025–

Preceded by Streatham HC	English League Champions; 1950–51	Succeeded by Wembley Lions
Preceded by Streatham HC	English League Champions; 1953–54	Succeeded by Last Champions
Preceded by Harringay Racers	Autumn Cup Winners; 1955–56	Succeeded by Brighton Tigers
Preceded by Harringay Racers	British League Champions; 1955–56	Succeeded by Wembley Lions
Preceded by Murrayfield Racers	Autumn Cup Winners; 1986–87	Succeeded by Durham Wasps
Preceded by Durham Wasps	Playoff Champions; 1988–89	Succeeded by Cardiff Devils
Preceded by Durham Wasps	Autumn Cup Winners; 1991–92	Succeeded by Cardiff Devils
Preceded by Murrayfield Racers	Autumn Cup Winners; 1994–95	Succeeded by Sheffield Steelers
Preceded by Sheffield Steelers	Autumn Cup Winners; 1996–97	Succeeded by Ayr Scottish Eagles
Preceded by Ayr Scottish Eagles	Autumn Cup Winners; 1998–99	Succeeded by Manchester Storm
Preceded by Sheffield Steelers	Challenge Cup Winners; 2003–04	Succeeded by Coventry Blaze
Preceded by Newcastle Vipers	Playoff Champions; 2006–07	Succeeded by Sheffield Steelers
Preceded by Coventry Blaze	Challenge Cup Winners; 2007–08	Succeeded by Belfast Giants
Preceded by Belfast Giants	Challenge Cup Winners; 2009–10, 2010–11, 2011–12, 2012–13, 2013-14	Succeeded by Cardiff Devils
Preceded by Belfast Giants	Playoff Champions; 2010–11, 2011–12, 2012–13	Succeeded by Belfast Giants
Preceded by Belfast Giants	Elite League Champions; 2012–13	Succeeded by Belfast Giants
Preceded by Cardiff Devils	Challenge Cup Winners; 2015-16	Succeeded by Cardiff Devils
Preceded by Coventry Blaze	Playoff Champions; 2015-16	Succeeded by Sheffield Steelers
Preceded by Dragons de Rouen	Continental Cup Winners; 2016-17	Succeeded by Yunost Minsk
