= 1976 Ahearne Cup =

Ice hockey tournament

Tournament details
- Host country: Sweden
- City: Stockholm
- Venue: 1 (in 1 host city)
- Dates: December 26, 1975 – December 30, 1975
- Teams: 6 (from 3 nations)

Final positions
- Champions: (Soviet Union) HC Dynamo Moscow
- Runners-up: (Czechoslovakia) HC Sparta Praha
- Third place: (Sweden) Södertälje SK
- Fourth place: (Sweden) AIK

Tournament statistics
- Games played: 15
- Goals scored: 133 (8.87 per game)

The 1976 Ahearne Cup was the 24th edition of the Ahearne Cup ice hockey tournament. Six teams participated in the tournament, which was won by HC Dynamo Moscow of the Soviet Union. It was held from December 26–30, 1975, in Stockholm, Sweden.

== Results ==
	Club	GP	W	T	L	GF–GA	Pts
1.	(Soviet Union) HC Dynamo Moscow	5	5	0	0	34:14	10
2.	(Czechoslovakia) HC Sparta Praha	5	3	1	1	26:22	7
3.	(Sweden) Södertälje SK	5	1	3	1	22:21	5
4.	(Sweden) AIK	5	2	1	2	17:15	5
5.	(Sweden) Djurgårdens IF	5	1	0	4	21:33	2
6.	(Sweden) Hammarby IF	5	0	1	4	13:26	1
