= 1975 Ahearne Cup =

The 1975 Ahearne Cup was the 23rd edition of the Ahearne Cup ice hockey tournament. Six teams participated in the tournament, which was won by HC Dynamo Moscow of the Soviet Union. It was held from December 26–30, 1974, in Stockholm, Sweden.

== Results ==
	Club	GP	W	T	L	GF–GA	Pts
1.	(Soviet Union) HC Dynamo Moscow	5	3	2	0	17:12	8
2.	(Czechoslovakia) HC Sparta Praha	5	3	1	1	20:14	7
3.	(Sweden) Södertälje SK	5	3	0	2	23:18	6
4.	(Sweden) Leksands IF	5	2	1	2	21:19	5
5.	(Sweden) AIK	5	1	1	3	20:25	3
6.	(Sweden) Djurgårdens IF	5	0	1	4	16:29	1
