= Chick Zamick =

Canadian ice hockey player and coach

- Born: 16 April 1926 Winnipeg, Manitoba, Canada
- Died: 8 October 2007 (aged 81) London, England
- Height: 5 ft 8 in (173 cm)
- Weight: 176 lb (80 kg; 12 st 8 lb)
- Position: Centre
- Played for: Cleveland Barons; Nottingham Panthers; Altrincham Aces; Wembley Lions
- Playing career: 1947–1963

Victor Zamick (16 August 1926 – 8 October 2007), better known as Chick Zamick, was a Canadian ice hockey player and coach best known for his success as a player at the Nottingham Panthers. He is a member of the British Ice Hockey Hall of Fame and the Manitoba Hockey Hall of Fame.

== Early life ==
Zamick was born in Winnipeg, Manitoba, and was Jewish. He was one of 10 surviving children (of 13) born to Jewish parents originally from Ukraine. The children often went by the nickname "Chick", in reference to the number of pieces in a pack of Chiclets brand chewing gum (10). This nickname stuck to Victor. He began playing ice hockey at the age of 15 and played for the Cleveland Barons in the American Hockey League and St Catherine Teepees in the Ontario Hockey Association, and served in the Canadian Army, before his move to Europe.

== Nottingham Panthers ==
In 1947 he was asked by Sandy Archer, who had grown up in Winnipeg, to join the Nottingham Panthers, who were in their second season. Zamick went on to play for the English club for 11 seasons. He won seven scoring titles, and had 778 career goals with the Panthers with 645 assists in 624 games. He finished as the club's top point scorer in every season and only failed to score above 100 points twice. His best season came in 1954-55 when he scored 169 points in 62 games. During the 1955–56 season he coached the Panthers to the Autumn Cup, Ahearne Cup and league treble. He was voted on to nine consecutive All-Star teams.

Zamick left Nottingham in 1958 to take up a three-year coaching position in Geneva, Switzerland. After returning to the United Kingdom he spent time playing for the Altrincham Aces and Wembley Lions.

== Later life and death ==
After retiring from playing, Zamick opened several business in Nottingham including a dry cleaners, a sauna, and a squash club. Eventually Zamick moved to London. In 2005, a plaque was unveiled at the National Ice Centre commemorating his achievements.

Zamick died after a short illness on 8 October 2007 at 81 years of age. He was survived by his wife Vera, four children, and six grandchildren.

== Legacy ==
He scored 1,423 points in 778 appearances and remains one of the Nottingham Panthers' all-time leaders. His scoring records have only been surpassed by Paul Adey, who is the only other player to have amassed more than 1,000 points for the club.

== See also ==
- List of select Jewish ice hockey players
