= 1977 Ahearne Cup =

The 1977 Ahearne Cup was the 25th and final edition of the Ahearne Cup ice hockey tournament. Five teams participated in the tournament, which was won by Stockholm-based AIK. It was held from December 26–30, 1976, in Stockholm, Sweden.

== Results ==
	Club	GP	W	T	L	GF–GA	Pts
1.	(Sweden) AIK	4	4	0	0	34:16	8
2.	(Soviet Union) HC Dynamo Moscow	4	3	0	1	20:12	6
3.	(Sweden) Djurgårdens IF	4	1	1	2	21:24	3
4.	(Sweden) Södertälje SK	4	1	1	2	18:25	3
5.	(Finland) HIFK Helsinki	4	0	0	4	17:33	0
