= Archibald Stinchcombe =

British ice hockey player (1912–1994)

Archibald Stinchcombe (17 November 1912 – 3 November 1994) was a British ice hockey player from Cudworth near Barnsley, Yorkshire. The right-winger is best known for representing Great Britain at the international level, including at the 1936 and 1948 Winter Olympics. Stinchcombe was somewhat of a novelty among hockey players in that his vision was limited – he could only see out of one eye, and yet was able to enjoy an extremely successful career.

== Career ==
Olympic medal record

Men's Ice Hockey
Gold medal – first place	1936 Garmisch-Partenkirchen	Team

Stinchcombe's first appearance in British hockey was playing for Streatham in 1935. In his rookie season, he was selected as an All-Star. The recognition was enough to earn him a spot on the national team for the 1936 Winter Olympics.

The British team was a prohibitive underdog at the Olympics, with Canada favoured to take gold in ice hockey. However, behind the strong play of goalie Jimmy Foster and several other players with dual Canadian-British citizenship, Great Britain was able to win every game and capture its first (and only) Olympic gold in ice hockey.

After the Second World War, Stinchcombe played with the Wembley Lions and Wembley Monarchs. He was one of the first British hockey players to score over one hundred goals in the post-War period.

Stinchcombe continued to represent Great Britain on the national team until 1948. As captain of the team, Stinchcombe led Great Britain to a respectable fifth-place finish at the 1948 Winter Olympics in St. Moritz.

Upon his retirement in 1949, Stinchcombe went on to coach the Nottingham Panthers, leading them to English National Championships in 1951 and 1953. He was inducted into the British Ice Hockey Hall of Fame in 1951.
