= Alex Dampier =

Canadian hockey player and coach

- Born: May 3, 1951 (age 75) Nipigon, Ontario, Canada
- Height: 6 ft 0 in (183 cm)
- Weight: 180 lb (82 kg; 12 st 12 lb)
- Position: Left wing
- Shot: Left
- Played for: Cape Cod Cubs; Muskegon Mohawks; Murrayfield Racers
- Playing career: 1972–1985

Alex "Damps" Dampier (born May 3, 1951) is a Canadian former professional ice hockey player and coach. He is a member of the British Ice Hockey Hall of Fame.

== Playing career ==
Born in Nipigon, Ontario, Dampier combined playing ice hockey with a degree course in Physical Education at Lakehead University. He played for the Cape Cod Cubs in the Eastern Hockey League during the 1972–73 season before joining the Muskegon Mohawks in the International Hockey League the season after.

Dampier moved to the United Kingdom in 1978 and joined the Murrayfield Racers as a defender. He became the Racers' player-coach the following season and then only played intermittently for them from the beginning of the 1983–84 season until he retired from playing in 1985.

== Coaching career ==
=== Club ===
Whilst still playing (and coaching) the Racers, the team won the Northern League in the 1978–79, 1979–80 and 1980–81 seasons; the Northern Autumn Cup in 1979 and 1980; and the Icy Smith Cup in 1979, 1980 and 1981. After he retired from playing he coached the Racers to the playoff finals in 1984 and 1985.

In the summer of 1985 Dampier joined the Nottingham Panthers as coach. In his second season with the Panthers they won the Norwich Union Trophy in 1986 and the Autumn Cup in 1991. They also won the playoffs in 1989, made the playoffs semifinals in 1990 and were losing finalists in the playoffs in 1992. Whilst with the Panthers, Dampier was twice named the British Ice Hockey Writers Association's Coach of the Year in 1987 and 1989.

Dampier moved to the Panthers' arch-rivals, the Sheffield Steelers, in January 1993. Whilst with the Steelers, he guided them to promotion from the British Hockey League Division 1 and the following season, in the Premier Division, he took them to the playoff weekend at Wembley Arena. He became the club's General Manager and hired Clyde Tuyl as the head coach. Together, Dampier and Tuyl guided the Steelers to the club's first league championship. The following season, 1995–96, the team again won the league championship (the final one before the formation of the Ice Hockey Superleague) as well as the playoffs and the Benson & Hedges Cup for the club's first grand slam. The Steelers again won the playoffs in 1996–97.

At the end of the 1997–98 season, Dampier left the Steelers for the Newcastle Riverkings. He then rejoined the Panthers as Director of Hockey midway through the 1999–00 season and guided them to the finals of the Challenge Cup. The following season, 2001–02, he shared the coaching duties with Paul Adey before he returned to the North East to join the Newcastle Vipers for their inaugural season, 2002–03, in the British National League, again teaming up with Clyde Tuyl.

=== International ===
Dampier's first involvement on the international scene came in 1981 when he was the coach of the Great Britain team at the World Championships Pool C tournament in Peking, China. It was an inauspicious start for his international coaching career as the GB team lost all their matches and did not take part in world competition again until 1990. However, Dampier was put in charge of the under-21 GB team between 1982 and 1988 when they won the bronze medal in Pool C twice.

In 1990 Dampier was again made coach to the senior team for the World Championships Pool D tournament in Cardiff, Wales. The team won all four of the games and gained promotion to Pool C. Despite high expectations in 1991, the team only finished fifth in the nine team tournament held in Copenhagen, Denmark. However, the following year, 1992, in Hull, England the team gained promotion to World Championships Pool B and, in 1993, promotion into Pool A. However, in 1994 in Bolzano, Italy, the team lost all their matches and were relegated back to Pool B.

== Awards and honours ==
- BIHWA Coach of the Year for 1986–87 and 1988–89.
- Inducted to the British Ice Hockey Hall of Fame in 1995.
