= Nottingham Ice Stadium =

Defunct Ice rink in Nottingham, England

Coordinates: 52°57′10″N 1°8′22″W

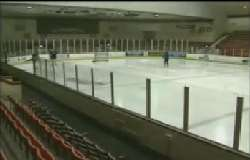
Nottingham Ice Stadium rink

The Nottingham Ice Stadium was an ice rink in Nottingham, England from 1939 to 2000. It had a seating capacity of 2800 for Ice hockey games.

The building was first opened in 1939 but it was quickly called upon for other purposes. Throughout World War II, the Ice Stadium acted as a store for guns, bullets and other ammunition produced at the nearby Royal Ordnance Factory, ROF Nottingham.

When the war ended, the building soon returned to being a recreational and ice sports building. A year after the end of the war, the Ice Stadium became the home of the Nottingham Panthers ice hockey team, who would use the facility until it closed, albeit with a twenty-year break.

When the Panthers disbanded in 1960, the Ice Stadium continued to be used for ice skating and some other ice sports. It was to be the rink where ice dancers Torvill and Dean would practise in their early years.

The Panthers were re-established in 1980, and the Ice Stadium became renowned as one of the most intimidating venues for opposition ice hockey teams to visit. It was affectionately known amongst the ice hockey fraternity as 'The Barn'. From 1980 to 1982, the legendary ice hockey player Les Strongman, was the Panthers Head coach.

In 1996, plans were announced to replace the ageing building with a modern arena and a new skating pad. The Nottingham Ice Stadium was closed after 61 years in 2000. The Panthers played their final game at the Ice Stadium against the Newcastle Riverkings, which was lost 2–1 in overtime. The building was demolished soon afterwards to allow for the completion of the National Ice Centre.
