= Paul Adey =

Canadian ice hockey player

- Born: August 28, 1963 (age 63) Montreal, Quebec, Canada
- Height: 5 ft 10 in (178 cm)
- Weight: 190 lb (86 kg; 13 st 8 lb)
- Position: Right wing
- Shot: Right
- Played for: Toledo Goaldiggers; Fort Wayne Komets; Peoria Rivermen; Briançon Alpes Provence; Nottingham Panthers; HC Milano; Sheffield Steelers
- National team: Great Britain
- Playing career: 1983–2004

Paul Adey (born August 28, 1963) is a Canadian former ice hockey player and coach. Adey enjoyed a notable playing career in British ice hockey, playing 11 seasons for the Nottingham Panthers between 1988 and 1999 and 29 games for the Sheffield Steelers during the 2000–01 season. His number 22 jersey is retired by the Panthers and he is a member of the British Ice Hockey Hall of Fame.

== Playing career ==
Born in Montreal, Quebec, Canada, Adey joined the Hull Olympiques in the Quebec Major Junior Hockey League in 1981 at the age of 18, moving to the Shawinigan Cataractes in 1983. His professional career began in International Hockey League with the Toledo Goaldiggers before he moved to the Fort Wayne Komets. After three seasons he moved to the Peoria Rivermen before moving to Europe in 1988. He began the 1988–89 season with Ligue Magnus side Briançon but in October joined the Nottingham Panthers in the British Hockey League. He played for the club for the next 11 seasons, finishing as the top point scorer on five occasions and setting club records for goals, assists, and points, surpassing the records previously held by Chick Zamick. Adey helped the team to the Playoff Championship in his first season and won four Autumn Cup winners medals with the team.

Adey departed for Italy in 1999 having scored 828 goals, 781 assists and 1,609 points in 609 appearances for the Panthers. In 2000–01 Adey was a mid-season signing for Nottingham's archrivals, the Sheffield Steelers. He scored 11 goals and earned 12 assists in 29 games for the Steelers, helping the club to a Grand Slam of all four cups. He retired from playing at the end of the 2000–01 season. However, whilst coaching, he played as an injury cover twice in the 2001–02 season and once in the 2003–04 season.

== Coaching career ==
Following his retirement as a player in 2001, Adey returned to Nottingham as a coach under director of hockey Alex Dampier. In 2002 he assumed the role of head coach after Dampier's dismissal. Adey presided over the Panthers for three seasons, leading the club the Challenge Cup in 2004, their first trophy since 1998. Following the 2004–05 season, Adey's contract was not renewed. In the summer of 2006 he became the head coach of Italian side Renon Ritten. He was retained for the 2007–08 season. He became coach of the Belfast Giants in the Elite Ice Hockey League for the 2013–2014 season, and helped bring them the League Cup and to the final of the Challenge Cup and the playoffs. He also won coach of the year that season. However, there was a lot of controversy when he was not retained to be coach in the following season. A statement released by Belfast Giants said 'that Adey and general manager Todd Kelman had failed to come to an agreement for next season and mutually decided to part ways'. Fans were shocked by this move by Kelman and the controversy continued when Kelman then left his general manager role at the Giants to buy the Cardiff Devils for the next season.

== Awards ==
- Named to the ISL All-star first team 1997 and 1999.
- Sekonda Face to Watch in January 1999.
- World Championships Pool B Silver medallist 1999.
- Jersey number (22) retired by Nottingham Panthers in 2003.
- Inducted to the British Ice Hockey Hall of Fame in 2006.

== Records ==
- All-time points record for Nottingham Panthers with 1609.

== Career statistics ==
=== Regular season and playoffs ===
			Regular season					Playoffs
Season	Team	League	GP	G	A	Pts	PIM	GP	G	A	Pts	PIM
1981–82	Hull Olympiques	QMJHL	54	17	24	41	0	14	8	9	17	9
1982–83	Hull Olympiques	QMJHL	70	58	104	162	14	7	5	11	16	0
1983–84	Shawinigan Cataractes	QMJHL	56	37	52	39	78	6	6	3	9	13
1983–84	Toledo Goaldiggers	IHL	2	0	0	0	0	—	—	—	—	—
1983–84	Fort Wayne Komets	IHL	—	—	—	—	—	3	0	0	0	0
1984–85	Fort Wayne Komets	IHL	81	30	31	61	135	13	4	7	11	23
1985–86	Fort Wayne Komets	IHL	39	13	11	24	44	—	—	—	—	—
1985–86	Peoria Rivermen	IHL	14	8	7	15	7	11	4	5	9	6
1986–87	Peoria Rivermen	IHL	79	35	28	63	40	—	—	—	—	—
1987–88	Briançon Alpes Provence	FRA	31	32	22	54	49	—	—	—	—	—
1988–89	Nottingham Panthers	BHL	34	82	71	153	99	6	6	12	18	6
1989–90	Nottingham Panthers	BHL	31	54	49	103	50	5	5	7	12	2
1990–91	Nottingham Panthers	BHL	36	72	35	107	30	6	7	6	13	4
1991–92	Nottingham Panthers	BHL	36	55	50	105	12	8	11	11	22	18
1992–93	Nottingham Panthers	BHL	35	66	58	124	50	7	10	15	25	10
1993–94	Nottingham Panthers	BHL	45	80	63	143	58	1	0	0	0	2
1995–96	Nottingham Panthers	BHL	56	85	69	154	81	8	10	1	11	39
1996–97	Nottingham Panthers	ISL	34	28	26	54	67	8	6	3	9	6
1997–98	Nottingham Panthers	ISL	44	14	23	37	14	6	0	5	5	6
1998–99	Nottingham Panthers	ISL	42	21	35	56	20	3	0	1	1	2
1999–00	HC Milano	FRA	29	15	17	32	24	—	—	—	—	—
2000–01	Sheffield Steelers	ISL	29	11	12	23	8	2	0	0	0	0
2001–02	Nottingham Panthers	ISL	2	0	0	0	0	1	0	0	0	0
2003–04	Nottingham Panthers	EIHL	1	0	0	0	0	—	—	—	—	—
IHL totals			215	86	77	163	226	24	8	12	20	29

=== International ===
Year	Team	Event	GP	G	A	Pts	PIM
1996	Great Britain	World Championships Pool B	7	4	4	8	10
1997	Great Britain	World Championships Pool B	7	5	1	6	4
1999	Great Britain	World Championships Pool B	7	3	3	6	2
1999	Great Britain	World Championships Pool A Qualifiers	3	0	0	0	0
2000	Great Britain	World Championships Pool B	7	2	5	7	14
2001	Great Britain	World Championships Division 1	5	3	2	5	4
Senior totals			36	17	15	32	34

=== Coaching career ===
Season	Team	League	G	W	L	T	OTL	PCT
2002–03	Nottingham Panthers	ISL	32	15	13	4	--	.469
2003–04	Nottingham Panthers	EIHL	56	34	14	6	2	.607
2004–05	Nottingham Panthers	EIHL	50	25	14	5	6	.500
2006–07	Renon Ritten	Italian Serie A	32	14	8	10	--	.438
2013–14	Belfast Giants	EIHL	52	43	6	0	3	.827
