= National Ice Centre =

Ice rink in Nottingham

The National Ice Centre
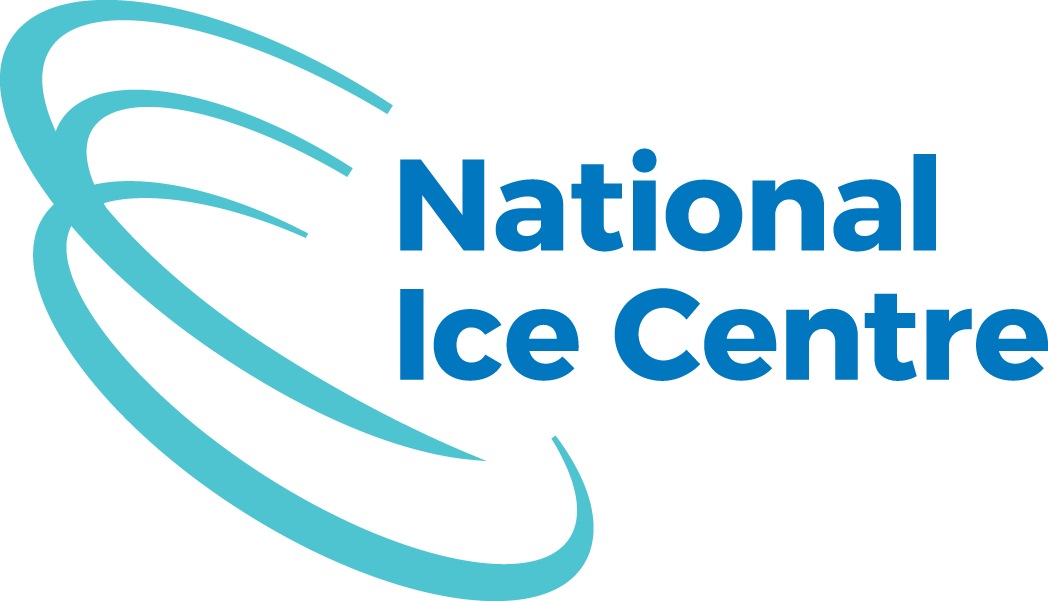

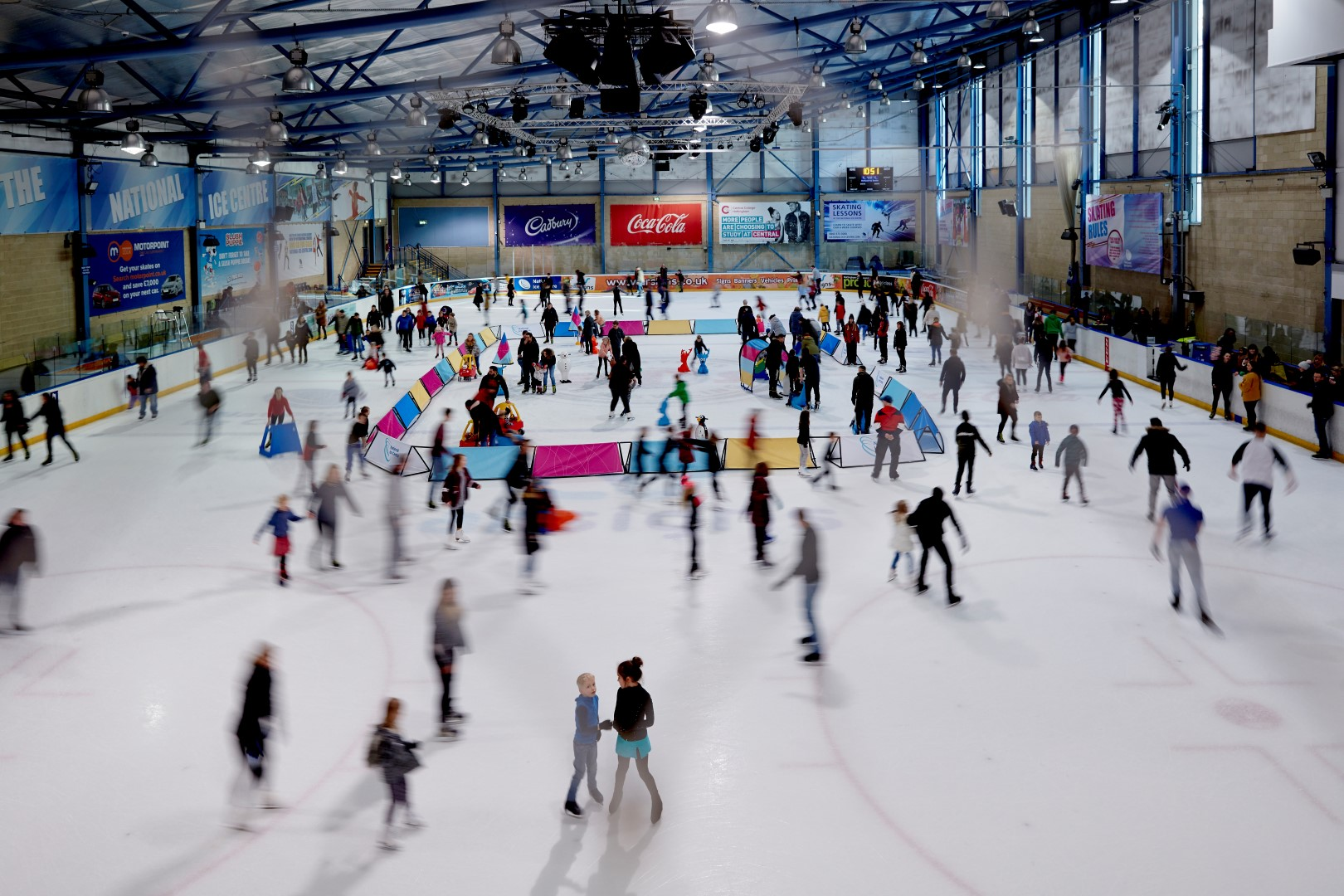
- The public rink at the National Ice Centre
- Interactive map of The National Ice Centre
- Location: Bolero Square; The Lace Market; Nottingham NG1 1LA; United Kingdom
- Coordinates: 52°57′10″N 1°8′22″W
- Owner: Nottingham City Council

Construction
- Groundbreaking: 1993
- Opened: 1 April 2000
- Cost: £43 million

Website
- national-ice-centre.com

The National Ice Centre (NIC) is located in Nottingham, England. It is situated just east of the city centre, close to the historic Lace Market area. The NIC was the first twin Olympic-sized (60m x 30m) ice pad facility in the UK, "heralding a new era in the development of ice skating". Incorporating the Nottingham Arena (since January 2016, rebranded as the Motorpoint Arena Nottingham), the NIC is a combined live entertainment and leisure venue.

The first ice rink (housed within the Arena) was opened on 1 April 2000 by Olympic Gold Medalist, Jayne Torvill. The second Olympic Rink was opened the following year, on 7 April 2001.

== History ==
=== Construction ===
The National Ice Centre was constructed on the site of the former Nottingham Ice Stadium, which opened in 1939 and was showing its age. Plans to replace the stadium were first announced in September 1995. The estimated cost of replacement was £13 million, part of which was to come from National Lottery funds. The plans were unveiled in October 1996, by which time the British Olympic Association were in support of the proposal.

Several buildings were demolished to make way for the new ice centre; this included an Art Deco warehouse and "The Old Cricket Players" pub, which was initially planned to be spared. The former Ice Stadium closed in March 2000, and by May 2000 was described as "nearly demolished", with four skip loads of demolition rubble being removed from the site every day. This had been the former training ground for Olympic ice dancing champions Torvill and Dean (Jayne Torvill and Christopher Dean). The square in front of the new building was named 'Bolero Square' to honour their achievements.

During excavation for the new building in July 1998, a rare 1,100-year-old Saxon jug was found, which is on display at the Nottingham Castle Museum. A 19th-century graveyard was also found under the car park, from which the bodies were then exhumed.

=== Opening ===
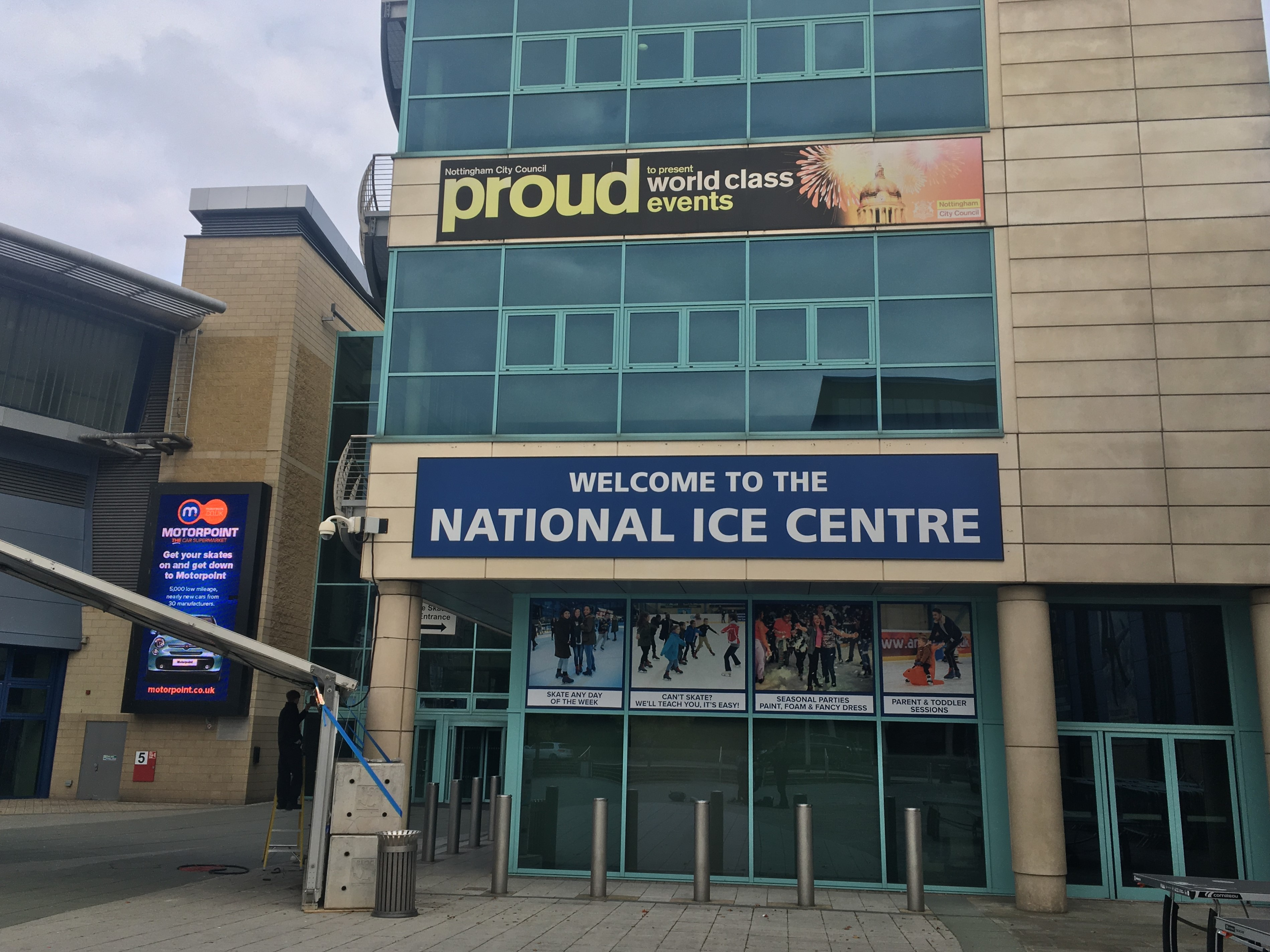
Main entrance on Bolero Square

The centre was officially opened on 1 April 2000 by Olympic Gold Medalist, Jayne Torvill; with the first public skating sessions taking place the same month. The second phase of the project – the 'family rink' – was scheduled to be completed by May–June 2001, but opened ahead of schedule, on 7 April 2001. The final cost of the project was £43 million, 10% of which came from the lottery – one of the highest grants awarded.

HM The Queen visited the National Ice Centre and Nottingham Arena on 31 July 2002.

== Facilities ==
Opened in April 2000, the Arena doubles as an Olympic-sized ice rink and a concert venue, in which case the ice is boarded over and the seating and staging are converted to suit the event. The seating capacity of the arena is 7,500 for ice sports and 10,000 for concerts.

The Olympic Rink was the second Olympic-sized ice pad to be opened, in April 2001. Sometimes referred to as the 'family rink', this is where the public ice skating sessions and fun family events are accommodated.

Incorporating these two ice pads, the NIC is used for a range of ice sports activities: ice hockey, figure skating, speed skating and synchronized skating. As well as encouraging absolute beginners to participate in these ice sports, there are many elite ice skaters training at the NIC.

=== GB Speed Skating Squad ===
The National Ice Skating Association (NISA) has designated the National Ice Centre as a Centre of Excellence for Short Track Speed Skating and it is the training ground for the GB Short Track Speed Skating Squad. Preparations for the 2018 Winter Olympics took place at the NIC prior to the squad flying out to PyeongChang at the end of January 2018.

The 2017 triple ISU World Champion, Elise Christie, is a member of the GB Short Track Speed Skating Squad. Christie broke the 500 m short track speed skating world record on 13 November 2016 in Salt Lake City, United States. This achievement was recognised by the NIC through the unveiling of a venue banner describing her as the "fastest woman on ice".

== Ice Stars ==
The award-winning TV documentary series, Ice Stars, was filmed at the National Ice Centre. Commissioned by CBBC, this series showcased the various disciplines of a group of young ice skaters at the NIC. There have been a total of three series to date; the first series aired in 2015.

The show featured young ice hockey players, speed skaters, teams from the Nottingham Synchronized Skating Academy (NSSA), and members of the NIC Figure Skating & Ice Dance Academy. The NIC has invested time and resources to support the production of Ice Stars in a bid to revive interest in ice skating around the UK.

Ice Stars is classified as a live-action programme in the BBC children's TV programmes list.

== Green accreditation ==
The National Ice Centre is an Industry Green accredited venue, committed to significantly reducing energy consumption. The facility takes into consideration the energy usage and the behaviour and activities of all staff, contractors and customers that visit the venue.

The environmental impact is managed in terms of:

- consumption of electricity, water, heat, gas and other resources
- production and disposal of waste and pollution
- atmosphere emissions from travel associated with the business

On Saturday 22 April 2017, the NIC participated in Earth Day 2017. On this day "the NIC generated all its energy from the sun for one hour via solar panels – the average energy used in one hour on a Saturday at the venue is 500 KWh, this is equivalent to 40 hairdryers being used for 30 minutes every day for a whole year!" An ice skating discount was offered on the day to customers who travelled to the venue via environmentally friendly means such as public transport or on foot.
