= Alex Archer (ice hockey) =

English ice hockey player (1908–1979)

- Born: 1 May 1908 West Ham, Essex, England
- Died: 15 June 1979 (aged 71) Exeter, England
- Height: 5 ft 11 in (180 cm)
- Weight: 160 lb (73 kg; 11 st 6 lb)
- Position: Right wing
- Shot: Right
- Played for: Wembley Lions
- National team: Great Britain
- Playing career: 1929–1947

Alexander Albert Archer (1 May 1908 – 15 June 1979) was a British ice hockey right winger who played in the English National League for the Wembley Lions. He is best remembered as a member of the Great Britain national ice hockey team which won gold in ice hockey at the 1936 Winter Olympics.

== Sporting career ==
Coach Archer (back row far right)

Archer was born in West Ham, Essex to Scottish parents. They moved to Winnipeg, Manitoba, when he was 3 years old. It was in Manitoba that Archer learned to play ice hockey and football. As well as being a Manitoban All-Star twice for ice hockey, Archer also played for the Manitoban All-Stars against a touring side from the Football Association of Wales in 1929 and against a touring side from the Scottish Football Association in 1935.

In 1993, Archer was inducted to the British Ice Hockey Hall of Fame with the rest of the 1936 Olympic British ice hockey squad who had not previously been inducted.

=== Club career ===
Archer returned to England to join the Wembley Lions for the 1935–36 season. He played for the Lions for the next five seasons scoring a total of 82 goals and 77 assists. Archer was also selected to the All-star A Team in 1938, 1939, and 1940.

Due to a fractured skull Archer's playing career came to an end in 1945, and he became a coach – first for Wembley and then for Nottingham Panthers and Murrayfield Racers. As a successful coach he was selected to coach the All-star B Team in 1947 and then again in 1948.

=== International career ===
Olympic medal record

Men's Ice Hockey
Gold medal – first place	1936 Garmisch-Partenkirchen	Team

Archer was selected to play for the Great Britain team at the 1936 Winter Olympics. However, this led to a complaint from the Canadian Amateur Hockey Association (CAHA) to the International Ice Hockey Federation (IIHF) as they claimed he had not been released from the Association. The IIHF suspended Archer for the duration of the tournament. CAHA president E. A. Gilroy chose not to object on the eve of the Olympics to Archer participating as a gesture of sportsmanship towards Great Britain. Archer went on to play in all seven of the games of the tournament and scored two goals.

Archer won two further medals with the GB team, winning silver medals at the 1937 and 1938 Ice Hockey World Championships. Archer retired from ice hockey in 1945 after he received a fractured skull in a game for GB against Sweden.

Archer played 24 times for GB, scoring 14 goals and 10 assists.

== Awards ==
- Two time Manitoban All-star.
- Olympic gold medalist in 1936.
- World championship silver medalist in 1937 and 1938.
- Named to the English National League All-star A Team in 1938, 1939 and 1940.
- Named as coach to the English National League All-star B Team in 1947 and 1948.
- Inducted to the British Ice Hockey Hall of Fame in 1993.
