= Les Strongman =

Canadian ice hockey player (1924–2019)

- Born: August 24, 1924; Winnipeg, Manitoba, Canada
- Died: August 8, 2019 (aged 94); Victoria, British Columbia, Canada
- Height: 6 ft 1 in (185 cm)
- Weight: 181 lb (82 kg; 12 st 13 lb)
- Position: Left wing
- Shot: Left
- Played for: Nottingham Panthers; Wembley Lions; Malmö FF; Zurich SC
- Playing career: 1946–1967

Les Strongman (23 August 1924 – 8 August 2019) was a Canadian ice hockey player. He was born in Winnipeg. Strongman played professional hockey in Europe between 1946 and 1968 with Malmo FF (Sweden), Zurich SC (Switzerland) and British National League teams Nottingham Panthers and Wembley Lions. Strongman was one of the most prolific scorers in European post-war ice hockey, and was elected to the British Ice Hockey Hall of Fame in 1987.
