= Ahearne Cup =

Two ice hockey tournaments

- Status: cancelled
- Genre: sporting event
- Date: Christmas-New Year
- Frequency: annual
- Location: Stockholm
- Country: Sweden
- Inaugurated: 1952
- Organiser: Dagens Nyheter

Ahearne Cup or Ahearne Trophy is the name of two ice hockey tournaments, the first played from 1952 to 1977 and the second created in 2001. Both are named after British ice hockey promoter, J. F. "Bunny" Ahearne.

== The original Ahearne Cup ==
The original Ahearne Cup was held in Sweden annually from 1952 to 1977 (no tournament played in 1957), with the finals at Johanneshovs Isstadion in Stockholm, and co-arranged by newspaper Dagens Nyheter. It was held in December and open to both club teams and national teams, although national teams seldom competed. While most teams were from Sweden, many teams from the United Kingdom, the Soviet Union, Czechoslovakia, Canada and Finland also competed. The record for most tournaments attended is shared between Swedish teams Södertälje SK and Djurgårdens IF, both with 20 entries, followed by Leksands IF and AIK with 12 each. Djurgården also has the record for most wins, four, while Harringay Racers and Spartak Moscow won the tournament three times each.

For many Swedes, this tournament was the first meeting with North American playing style, represented by Canadian amateur teams and British teams filled with Canadians. However, as professional hockey evolved in North America, the transatlantic amateur teams became both less competitive and less interested in joining European tournaments of this kind. The resulting downturn in public interest, together with tougher playing schedules in the European leagues, led to the cancellation of the tournament.

=== Winners ===
- 1952: (Canada) Edmonton Mercurys
- 1953: Harringay Racers
- 1954: Harringay Racers
- 1955: Nottingham Panthers
- 1956: Soviet Union
- 1957: not played
- 1958: Harringay Racers
- 1959: Wembley Lions
- 1960: Djurgårdens IF
- 1961: Krylya Sovetov Moscow
- 1962: (Canada) Port Arthur Bear Cats
- 1963: Djurgårdens IF
- 1964: Soviet Union
- 1965: Brynäs IF
- 1966: Sherbrooke Castors
- 1967: Leksands IF
- 1968: Krylya Sovetov Moscow
- 1969: Djurgårdens IF
- 1970: HIFK Helsinki
- 1971: Spartak Moscow
- 1972: Spartak Moscow
- 1973: Spartak Moscow
- 1974: Djurgårdens IF
- 1975: Dynamo Moscow
- 1976: Dynamo Moscow
- 1977: AIK

=== Champion Table By Nation ===
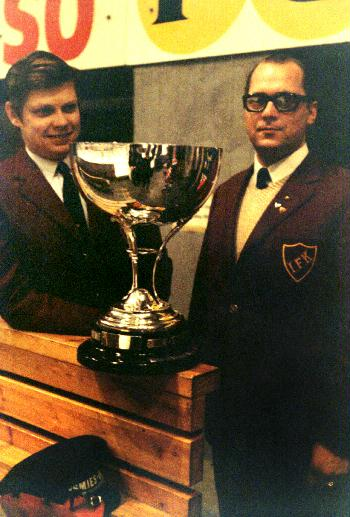
The only Finnish winner of the tournament was HIFK in 1970. Göran Stubb and Esko Rekomaa pose with the Ahearne trophy

Country	Gold
Soviet Union	9
Sweden	7
(United Kingdom) Great Britain	5
\ Canada	3
Finland	1
Total	25

== The Ahearne Trophy ==
The Ahearne Trophy was created to promote interest in the British Ice Hockey Superleague. It was played in 2002 between teams from the ISL and teams from the Deutsche Eishockey Liga and in 2003 between British and Norwegian teams. It was again played for in 2006 between British and German teams, this time with the British teams coming from the Elite Ice Hockey League.
Although the more recent event was called Ahearne Trophy instead of Ahearne Cup, and was not considered an official revival, Superleague organizers acknowledged that the similar name was meant to recapture some of the classic tournament's prestige.
