= Gord Redahl =

Canadian ice hockey player

- Born: August 28, 1935 Kinistino, Saskatchewan, Canada
- Died: June 22, 2011 (aged 75) Flin Flon, Manitoba, Canada
- Height: 5 ft 11 in (180 cm)
- Weight: 170 lb (77 kg; 12 st 2 lb)
- Position: Right wing
- Shot: Left
- Played for: Boston Bruins
- Playing career: 1954–1970

Gordon Charles Redahl (August 28, 1935 — June 22, 2011) was a Canadian professional ice hockey left winger who played 18 games in the National Hockey League for the Boston Bruins during the 1958–59 season. The rest of his career, which lasted from 1954 to 1970, was mainly spent in the minor Western Hockey League. He died in Flin Flon, Manitoba in 2011.

== Career statistics ==
=== Regular season and playoffs ===
			Regular season					Playoffs
Season	Team	League	GP	G	A	Pts	PIM	GP	G	A	Pts	PIM
1952–53	Flin Flon Bombers	SJHL	1	0	0	0	0	—	—	—	—	—
1953–54	Flin Flon Bombers	SJHL	39	27	19	46	10	17	8	8	16	8
1953–54	Saskatoon Quakers	WHL	1	1	0	1	0	—	—	—	—	—
1953–54	Flin Flon Bombers	M-Cup	—	—	—	—	—	4	0	0	0	2
1954–55	Flin Flon Bombers	SJHL	45	33	23	56	49	5	2	1	3	4
1955–56	Flin Flon Bombers	SJHL	48	39	39	78	62	12	9	5	14	8
1955–56	Saskatoon Quakers	WHL	1	0	0	0	2	—	—	—	—	—
1955–56	Flin Flon Bombers	M-Cup	—	—	—	—	—	7	2	1	3	12
1956–57	Winnipeg Warriors	WHL	65	14	12	26	19	—	—	—	—	—
1957–58	Winnipeg Warriors	WHL	57	20	27	47	30	7	5	3	8	4
1958–59	Boston Bruins	NHL	18	0	1	1	2	—	—	—	—	—
1958–59	Providence Reds	AHL	16	0	0	0	11	—	—	—	—	—
1958–59	Rochester Americans	AHL	15	4	2	6	2	—	—	—	—	—
1959–60	Winnipeg Warriors	WHL	70	24	22	46	20	—	—	—	—	—
1960–61	Winnipeg Warriors	WHL	67	19	24	43	19	—	—	—	—	—
1961–62	San Francisco Seals	WHL	51	16	17	33	10	—	—	—	—	—
1961–62	Pittsburgh Hornets	AHL	10	3	3	6	6	—	—	—	—	—
1962–63	Pittsburgh Hornets	AHL	5	1	0	1	2	—	—	—	—	—
1962–63	Calgary Stampeders	WHL	55	14	25	39	10	—	—	—	—	—
1963–64	Denver Invaders	WHL	69	25	33	58	24	6	2	4	6	4
1964–65	Victoria Maple Leafs	WHL	70	32	29	61	22	12	3	4	7	6
1965–66	Victoria Maple Leafs	WHL	66	23	26	49	12	14	3	3	6	2
1966–67	Rochester Americans	AHL	6	0	3	3	0	—	—	—	—	—
1966–67	Victoria Maple Leafs	WHL	41	9	10	19	12	5	0	1	1	0
1967–68	Phoenix Roadrunners	WHL	52	16	16	32	10	4	0	0	0	0
1968–69	Denver Spurs	WHL	65	18	17	35	18	—	—	—	—	—
1969–70	Denver Spurs	WHL	14	0	3	3	0	—	—	—	—	—
WHL totals			744	231	261	492	208	48	13	15	28	16
NHL totals			18	0	1	1	2	—	—	—	—	—
