= Norm Johnson (ice hockey) =

Canadian ice hockey player

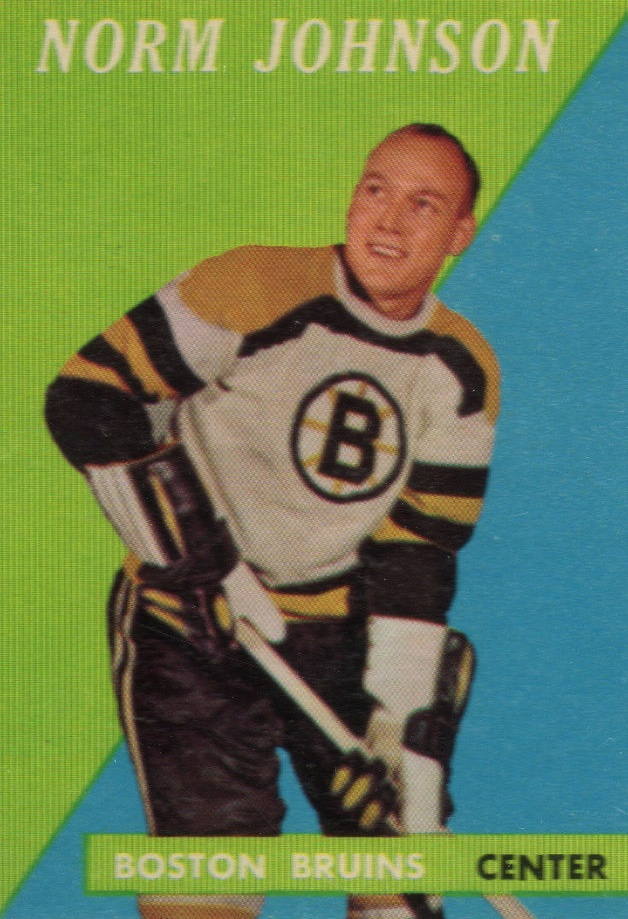
- Born: November 27, 1932 Moose Jaw, Saskatchewan, Canada
- Died: March 22, 2016 (aged 83) Portland, Oregon, United States
- Height: 5 ft 10 in (178 cm)
- Weight: 170 lb (77 kg; 12 st 2 lb)
- Position: Centre
- Shot: Left
- Played for: Boston Bruins; Chicago Black Hawks
- Playing career: 1953–1971

Norman Bruce Johnson (November 27, 1932 – March 22, 2016) was a Canadian ice hockey centre. He played for the Boston Bruins and Chicago Black Hawks between 1957 and 1960. The rest of his career, which lasted from 1953 to 1971, was mainly spent in the Western Hockey League.

== Career statistics ==
=== Regular season and playoffs ===
| | | | Regular season | | | | | Playoffs |
| Season | Team | League | GP | G | A | Pts | PIM | GP | G | A | Pts | PIM |
|---|---|---|---|---|---|---|---|---|---|---|---|---|
| 1949–50 | Moose Jaw Canucks | WCJHL | 3 | 0 | 0 | 0 | 0 | — | — | — | — | — |
| 1950–51 | Moose Jaw Canucks | WCJHL | 39 | 6 | 9 | 15 | 24 | — | — | — | — | — |
| 1951–52 | Moose Jaw Canucks | WCJHL | 44 | 16 | 13 | 29 | 96 | — | — | — | — | — |
| 1952–53 | Moose Jaw Canucks | WJHL | 33 | 25 | 16 | 41 | 42 | 9 | 4 | 3 | 7 | 8 |
| 1953–54 | Moose Jaw Millers | SSHL | 37 | 22 | 35 | 57 | 40 | 8 | 2 | 3 | 5 | 6 |
| 1953–54 | Moose Jaw Millers | Al-Cup | — | — | — | — | — | 7 | 2 | 3 | 5 | 4 |
| 1954–55 | Fort Wayne Komets | IHL | 22 | 7 | 8 | 15 | 17 | — | — | — | — | — |
| 1954–55 | Yorkton Terriers | WCSHL | — | — | — | — | — | 6 | 1 | 1 | 2 | 4 |
| 1954–55 | Yorkton Terriers | Al-Cup | — | — | — | — | — | 6 | 1 | 1 | 2 | 4 |
| 1955–56 | Brandon Regals | WHL | 69 | 15 | 22 | 37 | 53 | — | — | — | — | — |
| 1956–57 | Brandon Regals | WHL | 70 | 32 | 46 | 78 | 75 | 9 | 2 | 7 | 9 | 2 |
| 1957–58 | Boston Bruins | NHL | 15 | 2 | 3 | 5 | 8 | 12 | 4 | 0 | 4 | 6 |
| 1957–58 | Springfield Indians | AHL | 52 | 8 | 33 | 41 | 46 | — | — | — | — | — |
| 1958–59 | Boston Bruins | NHL | 39 | 2 | 17 | 19 | 25 | — | — | — | — | — |
| 1958–59 | Chicago Black Hawks | NHL | 7 | 1 | 0 | 1 | 8 | — | — | — | — | — |
| 1958–59 | Rochester Americans | AHL | 14 | 3 | 4 | 7 | 8 | 5 | 1 | 2 | 3 | 13 |
| 1959–60 | Calgary Stampeders | WHL | 45 | 20 | 40 | 60 | 32 | — | — | — | — | — |
| 1959–60 | Buffalo Bisons | AHL | 23 | 5 | 12 | 17 | 10 | — | — | — | — | — |
| 1959–60 | Chicago Black Hawks | NHL | — | — | — | — | — | 2 | 0 | 0 | 0 | 0 |
| 1960–61 | Calgary Stampeders | WHL | 58 | 23 | 64 | 87 | 19 | 5 | 1 | 3 | 4 | 2 |
| 1961–62 | Calgary Stampeders | WHL | 69 | 29 | 64 | 93 | 25 | 7 | 0 | 5 | 5 | 2 |
| 1962–63 | Calgary Stampeders | WHL | 69 | 22 | 43 | 65 | 27 | — | — | — | — | — |
| 1963–64 | Los Angeles Blades | WHL | 70 | 33 | 53 | 86 | 38 | 12 | 5 | 14 | 19 | 18 |
| 1963–64 | St. Paul Rangers | CHL | 1 | 0 | 1 | 1 | 2 | — | — | — | — | — |
| 1964–65 | Los Angeles Blades | WHL | 69 | 26 | 55 | 81 | 39 | — | — | — | — | — |
| 1965–66 | Los Angeles Blades | WHL | 71 | 23 | 54 | 77 | 34 | — | — | — | — | — |
| 1966–67 | Los Angeles Blades | WHL | 67 | 31 | 46 | 77 | 20 | — | — | — | — | — |
| 1967–68 | Portland Buckaroos | WHL | 72 | 23 | 40 | 63 | 24 | 12 | 1 | 9 | 10 | 14 |
| 1968–69 | Portland Bucakroos | WHL | 71 | 43 | 47 | 90 | 40 | 11 | 4 | 6 | 10 | 8 |
| 1969–70 | Portland Buckaroos | WHL | 71 | 34 | 62 | 96 | 34 | 11 | 7 | 10 | 17 | 24 |
| 1970–71 | Portland Buckaroos | WHL | 72 | 37 | 55 | 92 | 86 | 13 | 3 | 11 | 14 | 29 |
| 1971–72 | Spokane Jets | WIHL | — | — | — | — | — | — | — | — | — | — |
| WHL totals | | | 943 | 391 | 691 | 1082 | 546 | 80 | 23 | 65 | 88 | 99 |
| NHL totals | | | 61 | 5 | 20 | 25 | 41 | 14 | 4 | 0 | 4 | 6 |
