= Lou Jankowski =

Canadian ice hockey player (1931–2010)

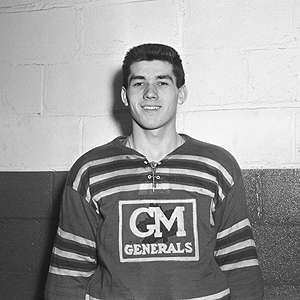
- Lou Jankowski as an Oshawa General.
- Born: June 27, 1931 Regina, Saskatchewan, Canada
- Died: March 21, 2010 (aged 78) Clearwater, Florida, U.S.
- Height: 6 ft 1 in (185 cm)
- Weight: 180 lb (82 kg; 12 st 12 lb)
- Position: Center/Right wing
- Shot: Right
- Played for: Chicago Black Hawks; Detroit Red Wings
- Playing career: 1951–1969

Louis Casimer Jankowski (June 27, 1931 – March 21, 2010) was a Canadian professional ice hockey forward and scout who played 131 games in the National Hockey League with the Detroit Red Wings and Chicago Black Hawks between 1951 and 1955. The rest of his career, which lasted from 1951 to 1969, was mainly spent in the minor Western Hockey League.

== Early life ==
Louis Casimer Jankowski was born on June 27, 1931, in Regina, Saskatchewan, the fourth of six sons to a Polish Catholic mother, Anna Jankowska. Anna, her husband, and three sons had immigrated to Canada in 1927 from Świdnik, Poland. The family later moved to Hamilton, Ontario.

== Playing career ==
Jankowski spent three seasons playing for the Oshawa Generals of the OHA. He played alongside Alex Delvecchio, where the duo became known for their offensive scoring punch.

A versatile forward who could play both the right wing and center positions, along with an ability to score profusely, Jankowski won the Eddie Powers Memorial Trophy as a member of the Generals, recording 65 goals, 59 assists and 124 points during the 1950-51 season.

Jankowski earned a tryout with the NHL’s Detroit Red Wings, where he reunited with Delvecchio. While Delvecchio was established as a mainstay in the Wings lineup, Jankowski's tenure with the club was seen as a disappointment, managing only a goal and two assists in 22 games.

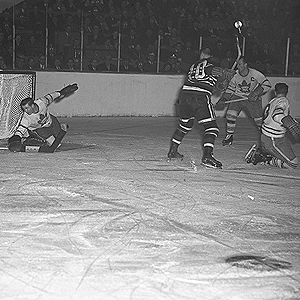
Jankowski (#10 for Chicago) scores during a 1954 game against the Toronto Maple Leafs and Harry Lumley while Leafs Captain Ted Kennedy looks on.

In the summer of 1953, the Red Wings sold Jankowski's contract to the Chicago Black Hawks. Jankowski displayed some of his scoring touch, notching 15 goals in 68 games, despite limited playing time.

Jankowski's NHL career ended with 19 goals, 18 assists and 15 penalty minutes in 127 career games played.

After other NHL clubs showed no interest in offering a contract, Jankowski signed with the Calgary Stampeders of the Western Hockey League, where he would reestablish his offensive game. Jankowski led the league in goals during his first three seasons, scoring a career high 57 goals in the 1960-61 season.

Jankowski was named to the WHL All-Star Team four times between 1959 and 1963, earning the Leader Cup award as the WHL's Most Valuable Player in 1961.

Jankowski led the league in goals with 41, during the 1963-64 season as a member of the Denver Invaders, where he was the recipient of the Fred J. Hume Cup as the league's most gentlemanly player.

Jankowski would play for various minor league clubs, before announcing his retirement after 18 professional seasons.

Jankowski found a second career as a scout in 1972. He would work for the St. Louis Blues, Washington Capitals, the NHL Central Scouting Bureau, and the New York Rangers, for whom he was employed for 15 years, retiring from the organization in 1993.

== Personal life ==
Jankowski was married twice. His first marriage was to Helen Kelly, the sister of Hall of Famer Red Kelly.

Jankowski has three children. His son Ryan serves as the assistant general manager for the Seattle Kraken.

His grandson, Mark Jankowski is a forward for the Carolina Hurricanes.

== Career statistics ==
=== Regular season and playoffs ===
			Regular season					Playoffs
Season	Team	League	GP	G	A	Pts	PIM	GP	G	A	Pts	PIM
1947–48	Hamilton Aerovox	OHA-B	—	—	—	—	—	9	5	4	9	2
1948–49	Oshawa Generals	OHA	34	7	5	12	27	2	0	0	0	0
1949–50	Oshawa Generals	OHA	45	20	32	52	31	—	—	—	—	—
1950–51	Oshawa Generals	OHA	54	65	59	124	14	5	6	4	10	2
1950–51	Detroit Red Wings	NHL	1	0	1	1	0	—	—	—	—	—
1951–52	Indianapolis Capitals	AHL	51	18	18	36	49	—	—	—	—	—
1952–53	Detroit Red Wings	NHL	22	1	2	3	0	1	0	0	0	0
1952–53	Edmonton Flyers	WHL	10	3	1	4	0	—	—	—	—	—
1953–54	Chicago Black Hawks	NHL	68	15	13	28	7	—	—	—	—	—
1954–55	Chicago Black Hawks	NHL	40	3	2	5	8	—	—	—	—	—
1954–55	Buffalo Bisons	AHL	11	8	8	16	2	10	0	7	7	0
1955–56	Buffalo Bisons	AHL	62	14	20	34	8	4	1	2	3	0
1956–57	Buffalo Bisons	AHL	64	13	24	37	17	—	—	—	—	—
1957–58	Buffalo Bisons	AHL	59	21	25	46	0	—	—	—	—	—
1958–59	Calgary Stampeders	WHL	54	45	47	92	13	4	1	1	2	0
1959–60	Calgary Stampeders	WHL	70	42	42	84	9	—	—	—	—	—
1960–61	Calgary Stampeders	WHL	69	57	42	99	7	5	3	2	5	2
1961–62	Calgary Stampeders	WHL	64	44	40	84	13	7	2	4	6	0
1962–63	Calgary Stampeders	WHL	67	24	26	50	4	—	—	—	—	—
1963–64	Denver Invaders	WHL	69	41	44	85	10	6	5	2	7	2
1964–65	Victoria Maple Leafs	WHL	69	30	27	57	16	12	3	2	5	2
1965–66	Victoria Maple Leafs	WHL	68	32	32	64	10	14	4	2	6	8
1966–67	Victoria Maple Leafs	WHL	67	22	37	59	4	—	—	—	—	—
1967–68	Phoenix Roadrunners	WHL	72	25	23	48	6	4	0	0	0	0
1968–69	Denver Spurs	WHL	19	2	3	5	0	—	—	—	—	—
1968–69	Amarillo Wranglers	CHL	46	14	11	25	2	—	—	—	—	—
NHL totals			127	19	18	37	15	1	0	0	0	0
WHL totals			698	367	364	731	92	52	18	13	31	14

== Awards and achievements ==
- Eddie Powers Memorial Trophy (OHA/OHL Leading Scorer) (1950–51)
- WHL Prairie Division First All-Star Team (1959)
- WHL First All-Star Team (1960, 1961, 1964)
- Leader Cup (MVP - WHL) (1961)
- WHL Second All-Star Team (1962)
- Fred J. Hume Cup (Most Gentlemanly Player - WHL) (1964)

== Records ==
- OHA - Most points in one season (65G, 59A, 124P in 54 games)
- WHL - Most goals in one season (57G in 69 games)
