= Fred Hucul =

Canadian ice hockey player (1931–2025)

- Born: December 4, 1931 Tuberose, Saskatchewan, Canada
- Died: June 5, 2025 (aged 93)
- Height: 5 ft 10 in (178 cm)
- Weight: 170 lb (77 kg; 12 st 2 lb)
- Position: Defence
- Shot: Left
- Played for: Chicago Black Hawks; St. Louis Blues
- Playing career: 1951–1969

Frederick Albert Hucul (December 4, 1931 – June 5, 2025) was a Canadian professional ice hockey player who appeared in 164 games in the National Hockey League (NHL) for the Chicago Black Hawks and St. Louis Blues between 1951 and 1968. The rest of his career, which stretched from 1951 to 1969, was spent in the minor leagues. Hucul shares the NHL record for the longest gap between NHL appearances, 13 years, along with Larry Zeidel, his former Chicago teammate.

== Career ==
A star in junior hockey with the Moose Jaw Canucks and Regina Capitals, Hucul debuted with the Black Hawks during 1950–51 season the and bounced between Chicago and minor league clubs for the next four seasons. Following 27 games in the NHL in 1953–54, Hucul then spent the bulk of his professional career in the Western Hockey League with the Calgary Stampeders and Victoria Maple Leafs. For six years in Calgary and in Victoria, he was teamed with his brother Sandy Hucul. In the 1955–56 season, Hucul scored 21 goals and 38 assists. Upon the NHL's expansion beyond six teams for the 1967–68 season, Hucul signed with the St. Louis Blues and began their inaugural season on the Blues' blue line. However, before the Stanley Cup Playoffs, Hucul was sent to the Blues' minor league team, the Kansas City Blues in the Central Hockey League, where he replaced Doug Harvey as the coach and general manager after Harvey was called up to the parent Blues for the postseason. Amid conflict and interference with Scotty Bowman and Cliff Fletcher, manager and assistant manager of the parent St. Louis Blues, over how to run the team, Hucul guided the Kansas City Blues through two losing seasons before being replaced. He gave coaching one more try in 1971–72, leading the Victoria Cougars of the WCHL to an 18-48-2 record before being fired and retiring to his cattle ranch in Alberta.

== Later life and death ==
Hucul later resided in Tucson, Arizona. His death at the age of 93 was announced by the NHL Alumni Association on June 27, 2025.

== Career statistics ==
=== Regular season and playoffs ===
			Regular season					Playoffs
Season	Team	League	GP	G	A	Pts	PIM	GP	G	A	Pts	PIM
1948–49	Wetaskiwin Canadians	EJrHL	—	—	—	—	—	—	—	—	—	—
1948–49	Wetaskiwin Canadians	M-Cup	—	—	—	—	—	3	1	2	3	14
1949–50	Moose Jaw Canucks	WCJHL	27	8	11	19	59	4	1	2	3	8
1950–51	Moose Jaw Canucks	WCJHL	37	19	27	46	165	—	—	—	—	—
1950–51	Chicago Black Hawks	NHL	3	1	0	1	2	—	—	—	—	—
1950–51	Regina Capitals	WCSHL	5	0	2	2	4	—	—	—	—	—
1951–52	St. Louis Flyers	AHL	9	2	3	5	8	—	—	—	—	—
1951–52	Chicago Black Hawks	NHL	34	3	7	10	37	—	—	—	—	—
1952–53	Chicago Black Hawks	NHL	55	5	7	12	25	6	1	0	1	10
1953–54	Calgary Stampeders	WHL	15	7	4	11	12	—	—	—	—	—
1953–54	Quebec Aces	QSHL	13	4	6	10	26	12	1	3	4	10
1953–54	Chicago Black Hawks	NHL	27	0	3	3	19	—	—	—	—	—
1954–55	Calgary Stampeders	WHL	51	12	23	35	59	—	—	—	—	—
1955–56	Calgary Stampeders	WHL	70	21	38	59	85	8	1	4	5	19
1956–57	Buffalo Bisons	AHL	9	0	6	6	11	—	—	—	—	—
1957–58	Calgary Stampeders	WHL	61	18	40	58	51	14	1	4	5	27
1958–59	Calgary Stampeders	WHL	64	7	36	43	61	8	1	0	1	9
1959–60	Calgary Stampeders	WHL	66	7	46	53	32	—	—	—	—	—
1960–61	Calgary Stampeders	WHL	67	9	42	51	55	5	0	0	0	9
1961–62	Calgary Stampeders	WHL	53	19	37	56	42	7	0	4	4	2
1963–63	Calgary Stampeders	WHL	70	16	41	57	56	—	—	—	—	—
1963–64	Denver Invaders	WHL	69	8	49	57	58	6	3	4	7	6
1964–65	Victoria Maple Leafs	WHL	51	8	20	28	67	12	1	4	5	28
1965–66	Tulsa Oilers	CHL	7	1	0	1	4	—	—	—	—	—
1965–66	Victoria Maple Leafs	WHL	61	16	43	59	56	14	8	7	15	14
1966–67	Victoria Maple Leafs	WHL	13	3	6	9	12	—	—	—	—	—
1967–68	St. Louis Blues	NHL	43	2	13	15	30	14	8	7	15	14
1968–69	Kansas City Blues	CHL	2	0	1	1	0	—	—	—	—	—
WHL totals			711	151	425	576	646	74	15	27	42	114
NHL totals			162	11	30	41	113	6	1	0	1	10
