= Jimmy McLeod =

Canadian ice hockey player (1937–2019)

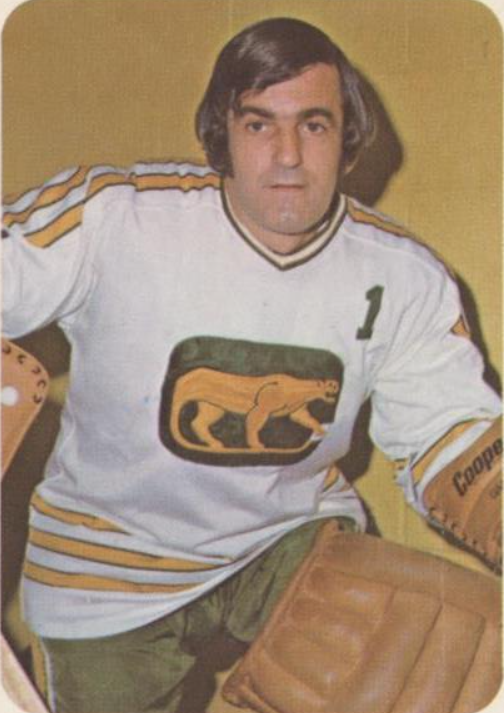
- McLeod with the Chicago Cougars in 1973
- Born: April 8, 1937 Thunder Bay, Ontario, Canada
- Died: May 18, 2019 (aged 82) Clackamas County, Oregon, U.S.
- Height: 5 ft 8 in (173 cm)
- Weight: 170 lb (77 kg; 12 st 2 lb)
- Position: Goaltender
- Caught: Left
- Played for: St. Louis Blues; Chicago Cougars; New York Golden Blades/Jersey Knights; Los Angeles Sharks; Michigan Stags
- Playing career: 1956–1975

James Bradley McLeod (April 8, 1937 – May 18, 2019) was a Canadian ice hockey goaltender. He played 16 games in the National Hockey League with the St. Louis Blues during the 1971–72 season, and 97 games in the World Hockey Association with the Chicago Cougars, New York Golden Blades/Jersey Knights, Los Angeles Sharks, and Michigan Stags from 1972 to 1975. The rest of his career, which lasted from 1956 to 1975, was spent in the minor leagues.

== Playing career ==
McLeod started his National Hockey League career with the St. Louis Blues in 1972. He also played in the World Hockey Association with the Chicago Cougars, Los Angeles Sharks, Michigan Stags, and New York Golden Blades. He retired after the 1975 season, and died in 2019.

== Career statistics ==
=== Regular season and playoffs ===
			Regular season									Playoffs
Season	Team	League	GP	W	L	T	MIN	GA	SO	GAA	SV%	GP	W	L	T	MIN	GA	SO	GAA	SV%
1955–56	Port Arthur Bearcats	TBJHL	—	—	—	—	—	—	—	—	—	—	—	—	—	—	—	—	—	—
1956–57	Vernon Canadians	OSHL	4	—	—	—	240	15	0	3.75	—	—	—	—	—	—	—	—	—	—
1957–58	Vernon Canadians	OSHL	2	—	—	—	120	12	0	6.00	—	—	—	—	—	—	—	—	—	—
1958–59	Vernon Canadians	OSHL	6	—	—	—	360	30	1	5.00	—	—	—	—	—	—	—	—	—	—
1959–60	Vernon Canadians	OSHL	44	—	—	—	2640	148	2	3.36	—	13	7	5	1	760	44	1	3.38	—
1959–60	Kelowna Packers	Al-Cup	—	—	—	—	—	—	—	—	—	3	0	3	—	180	20	6.67	—	—
1960–61	Muskegon Zephyrs	IHL	62	—	—	—	3720	269	1	4.34	—	13	5	8	—	780	48	0	3.38	—
1960–61	Seattle Totems	WHL	7	5	2	0	428	24	0	3.36	—	—	—	—	—	—	—	—	—	—
1961–62	Muskegon Zephyrs	IHL	47	—	—	—	2820	157	1	3.34	—	9	8	1	—	540	28	0	3.11	—
1961–62	Seattle Totems	WHL	12	6	6	0	720	37	0	3.08	—	—	—	—	—	—	—	—	—	—
1962–63	San Francisco Seals	WHL	67	43	23	1	4090	202	4	3.01	—	17	10	7	—	1054	56	3	3.19	—
1963–64	Los Angeles Blades	WHL	39	18	15	6	2340	127	4	3.26	—	5	2	2	—	260	14	0	3.23	—
1964–65	Seattle Totems	WHL	65	35	27	3	3970	181	5	2.74	—	7	3	4	—	420	19	1	2.71	—
1965–66	Seattle Totems	WHL	46	20	23	2	2751	167	2	3.64	—	—	—	—	—	—	—	—	—	—
1966–67	Seattle Totems	WHL	42	26	11	4	2528	101	4	2.40	—	8	6	2	—	480	15	1	1.88	—
1967–68	Portland Buckaroos	WHL	33	18	10	4	1961	73	4	2.23	—	7	4	3	—	407	17	1	2.51	—
1968–69	Portland Buckaroos	WHL	42	23	9	8	2363	90	3	2.29	—	8	4	3	—	433	27	0	3.74	—
1969–70	Portland Buckaroos	WHL	33	21	9	0	1794	103	0	3.44	—	9	5	4	—	539	25	2	2.78	—
1970–71	Portland Buckaroos	WHL	47	32	10	3	2710	122	5	2.70	—	11	8	3	—	678	23	1	2.03	—
1971–72	St. Louis Blues	NHL	16	6	6	4	879	44	0	3.01	.890	—	—	—	—	—	—	—	—	—
1971–72	Portland Buckaroos	WHL	13	9	3	0	735	34	0	2.78	—	11	5	6	—	658	39	0	3.55	—
1972–73	Chicago Cougars	WHA	54	22	25	2	2996	166	1	3.32	.905	—	—	—	—	—	—	—	—	—
1973–74	New York Golden Blades/Jersey Knights	WHA	10	3	7	0	517	36	0	4.18	.878	—	—	—	—	—	—	—	—	—
1973–74	Los Angeles Sharks	WHA	17	4	13	0	969	69	1	4.27	.857	—	—	—	—	—	—	—	—	—
1974–75	Michigan Stags	WHA	16	3	6	1	694	53	0	4.58	.874	—	—	—	—	—	—	—	—	—
1974–75	Syracuse Blazers	NAHL	3	3	0	0	180	5	0	1.67	—	—	—	—	—	—	—	—	—	—
1974–75	Greensboro Generals	SHL	2	—	—	—	120	8	0	4.00	.917	—	—	—	—	—	—	—	—	—
WHA totals			97	32	51	3	5175	324	2	3.76	.890	—	—	—	—	—	—	—	—	—
NHL totals			16	6	6	4	879	44	0	3.01	.890	—	—	—	—	—	—	—	—	—
