= Chuck Holmes (ice hockey) =

Canadian ice hockey player (1934–2019)

- Born: September 21, 1934 Edmonton, Alberta, Canada
- Died: March 13, 2019 (aged 84)
- Height: 6 ft 0 in (183 cm)
- Weight: 185 lb (84 kg; 13 st 3 lb)
- Position: Right wing
- Shot: Right
- Played for: Detroit Red Wings
- Playing career: 1955–1971

Charles Frank Holmes (September 21, 1934 – March 13, 2019) was a Canadian professional ice hockey player who played 23 games in the National Hockey League with the Detroit Red Wings 1958 and 1962. The rest of his career, which lasted from 1955 to 1971, was mainly spent in the minor Western Hockey League. He is the son of the former NHL hockey player, Louis Holmes.

== Career statistics ==
=== Regular season and playoffs ===
			Regular season					Playoffs
Season	Team	League	GP	G	A	Pts	PIM	GP	G	A	Pts	PIM
1951–52	Edmonton Oil Kings	WCJHL	1	1	0	1	2	—	—	—	—	—
1952–53	Edmonton Oil Kings	WCJHL	14	12	8	20	17	11	5	4	9	6
1953–54	Edmonton Oil Kings	WCJHL	35	32	36	68	41	10	7	15	22	12
1953–54	Edmonton Oil Kings	M-Cup	—	—	—	—	—	13	5	11	16	30
1954–55	Edmonton Oil Kings	WCJHL	26	17	14	31	43	5	2	2	4	14
1954–55	Edmonton Flyers	WHL	8	1	2	3	0	9	2	1	3	2
1955–56	Edmonton Flyers	WHL	69	16	22	38	54	3	1	0	1	0
1956–57	Edmonton Flyers	WHL	65	18	23	41	35	8	1	3	4	8
1957–58	Edmonton Flyers	WHL	57	23	34	57	58	5	0	0	0	2
1958–59	Edmonton Flyers	WHL	43	13	22	35	44	3	0	0	0	0
1958–59	Detroit Red Wings	NHL	15	0	3	3	6	—	—	—	—	—
1959–60	Edmonton Flyers	WHL	64	22	37	59	33	4	0	1	1	2
1960–61	Edmonton Flyers	WHL	68	19	32	51	19	—	—	—	—	—
1961–62	Edmonton Flyers	WHL	60	27	47	74	43	12	3	8	11	6
1961–62	Detroit Red Wings	NHL	8	1	0	1	4	—	—	—	—	—
1962–63	Pittsburgh Hornets	AHL	30	1	15	16	8	—	—	—	—	—
1962–63	Edmonton Flyers	WHL	39	14	23	37	39	3	1	2	3	10
1963–64	Pittsburgh Hornets	AHL	37	8	14	22	28	—	—	—	—	—
1964–65	Memphis Wings	CPHL	15	2	6	8	12	—	—	—	—	—
1964–65	Seattle Totems	WHL	42	11	13	24	41	7	3	1	4	12
1965–66	Portland Buckaroos	WHL	71	10	20	30	20	8	0	1	1	2
1966–67	Seattle Totems	WHL	71	14	13	27	44	10	5	2	7	13
1967–68	Seattle Totems	WHL	72	23	24	47	55	9	4	4	8	2
1968–69	Seattle Totems	WHL	74	25	38	63	40	4	0	1	1	0
1969–70	Seattle Totems	WHL	69	16	15	31	26	6	2	1	3	0
1970–71	Seattle Totems	WHL	44	11	18	29	31	—	—	—	—	—
WHL totals			916	263	383	646	582	91	22	25	47	59
NHL totals			23	1	3	4	10	—	—	—	—	—
