= Robert Kabel =

Canadian ice hockey player

- Born: November 11, 1934 Dauphin, Manitoba, Canada
- Died: November 12, 2016 (aged 82) Alberta, Canada
- Height: 6 ft 0 in (183 cm)
- Weight: 183 lb (83 kg; 13 st 1 lb)
- Position: Centre
- Shot: Right
- Played for: New York Rangers
- Playing career: 1955–1970

Robert Gerald Kabel (November 11, 1934 – November 12, 2016) was a Canadian ice hockey forward who played 48 games in the National Hockey League with New York Rangers during the 1959–60 and 1960–61 seasons. The rest of his career, which lasted from 1955 to 1970, was spent in various minor leagues.

== Career statistics ==
=== Regular season and playoffs ===
| | | | Regular season | | | | | Playoffs |
| Season | Team | League | GP | G | A | Pts | PIM | GP | G | A | Pts | PIM |
|---|---|---|---|---|---|---|---|---|---|---|---|---|
| 1952–53 | Flin Flon Bombers | SJHL | 47 | 26 | 12 | 38 | 54 | 11 | 5 | 2 | 7 | 4 |
| 1952–53 | Flin Flon Bombers | M-Cup | — | — | — | — | — | 2 | 1 | 0 | 1 | 2 |
| 1953–54 | Flin Flon Bombers | SJHL | 46 | 23 | 34 | 57 | 50 | 17 | 3 | 14 | 17 | 37 |
| 1953–54 | Flin Flon Bombers | M-Cup | — | — | — | — | — | 4 | 0 | 3 | 3 | 4 |
| 1954–55 | Saskatoon Westleys | SJHL | 46 | 19 | 21 | 40 | 62 | 5 | 1 | 1 | 2 | 17 |
| 1954–55 | Saskatoon Quakers | WHL | 1 | 0 | 0 | 0 | 2 | — | — | — | — | — |
| 1955–56 | Vancouver Canucks | WHL | 60 | 14 | 12 | 26 | 60 | 15 | 2 | 4 | 6 | 14 |
| 1956–57 | Trois-Rivières Lions | QSHL | 57 | 9 | 16 | 25 | 49 | 4 | 0 | 0 | 0 | 14 |
| 1956–57 | Providence Reds | AHL | 7 | 0 | 2 | 2 | 6 | — | — | — | — | — |
| 1957–58 | Saskatoon Regals/St. Paul Saints | WHL | 69 | 23 | 43 | 66 | 82 | — | — | — | — | — |
| 1958–59 | Saskatoon Quakers | WHL | 63 | 28 | 27 | 55 | 29 | — | — | — | — | — |
| 1959–60 | New York Rangers | NHL | 44 | 5 | 11 | 16 | 32 | — | — | — | — | — |
| 1959–60 | Vancouver Canucks | WHL | 25 | 9 | 4 | 13 | 22 | — | — | — | — | — |
| 1960–61 | New York Rangers | NHL | 4 | 0 | 2 | 2 | 2 | — | — | — | — | — |
| 1960–61 | Springfield Indians | AHL | 53 | 27 | 25 | 52 | 45 | 6 | 0 | 4 | 4 | 6 |
| 1961–62 | Springfield Indians | AHL | 50 | 8 | 28 | 36 | 26 | 11 | 1 | 5 | 6 | 12 |
| 1962–63 | Vancouver Canucks | WHL | 63 | 20 | 51 | 71 | 32 | 7 | 5 | 4 | 9 | 2 |
| 1962–63 | Baltimore Clippers | AHL | 3 | 0 | 0 | 0 | 0 | — | — | — | — | — |
| 1963–64 | Vancouver Canucks | WHL | 70 | 17 | 50 | 67 | 52 | — | — | — | — | — |
| 1963–64 | St. Paul Rangers | CPHL | — | — | — | — | — | 4 | 1 | 3 | 4 | 0 |
| 1964–65 | Vancouver Canucks | WHL | 70 | 20 | 40 | 60 | 62 | 5 | 0 | 1 | 1 | 4 |
| 1965–66 | Providence Reds | AHL | 27 | 8 | 6 | 14 | 6 | — | — | — | — | — |
| 1965–66 | Vancouver Canucks | WHL | 42 | 9 | 9 | 18 | 14 | — | — | — | — | — |
| 1966–67 | California Seals | WHL | 47 | 9 | 9 | 18 | 20 | 4 | 0 | 0 | 0 | 2 |
| 1967–68 | Phoenix Roadrunners | WHL | 70 | 16 | 32 | 48 | 12 | 4 | 0 | 3 | 3 | 2 |
| 1968–69 | Phoenix Roadrunners | WHL | 68 | 14 | 33 | 47 | 20 | — | — | — | — | — |
| 1969–70 | Salt Lake Golden Eagles | WHL | 3 | 0 | 2 | 2 | 7 | — | — | — | — | — |
| WHL totals | | | 651 | 179 | 312 | 491 | 414 | 35 | 7 | 12 | 19 | 24 |
| NHL totals | | | 48 | 5 | 13 | 18 | 34 | — | — | — | — | — |

== Awards and achievements ==
- Calder Cup (AHL) Championships (1961 & 1962)
- Honoured Member of the Manitoba Hockey Hall of Fame
