= Tom Thurlby =

Canadian ice hockey player

- Born: November 9, 1938 (age 87) Kingston, Ontario, Canada
- Height: 5 ft 10 in (178 cm)
- Weight: 175 lb (79 kg; 12 st 7 lb)
- Position: Defence
- Shot: Left
- Played for: Oakland Seals
- Playing career: 1959–1973

Thomas Newman Thurlby (born November 9, 1938) is a Canadian former professional ice hockey defenceman who briefly played in the National Hockey League for the Oakland Seals.

== Career statistics ==
=== Regular season and playoffs ===
			Regular season					Playoffs
Season	Team	League	GP	G	A	Pts	PIM	GP	G	A	Pts	PIM
1955–56	Kitchener Canucks	OHA	35	2	4	6	4	8	2	4	6	4
1956–57	Peterborough Petes	OHA	52	8	7	15	30	—	—	—	—	—
1957–58	Peterborough Petes	OHA	52	7	10	17	28	5	2	0	2	8
1958–59	Peterborough Petes	OHA	54	9	19	28	34	19	0	3	3	18
1959–60	Montreal Royals	EPHL	68	4	12	16	57	11	0	1	1	14
1960–61	Kingston Frontenacs	EPHL	44	3	11	14	37	—	—	—	—	—
1960–61	Winnipeg Warriors/Portland Buckaroos	WHL	23	4	3	7	17	14	2	3	5	17
1961–62	San Francisco Seals	WHL	70	4	17	21	36	2	0	0	0	0
1962–63	San Francisco Seals	WHL	70	12	24	36	41	17	3	5	8	4
1963–64	San Francisco Seals	WHL	61	7	10	17	14	11	4	6	10	12
1964–65	San Francisco Seals	WHL	70	11	22	33	32	—	—	—	—	—
1965–66	San Francisco Seals	WHL	71	13	17	30	26	7	1	1	2	4
1966–67	San Francisco Seals	WHL	72	10	16	26	26	6	0	0	0	2
1967–68	Oakland Seals	NHL	20	1	1	2	4	—	—	—	—	—
1967–68	Vancouver Canucks	WHL	47	4	11	15	20	—	—	—	—	—
1968–69	Houston Apollos	CHL	53	3	7	10	8	3	0	0	0	0
1969–70	Muskegon Mohawks	IHL	60	5	19	24	28	6	0	3	3	2
1971–72	Kingston Aces	OHA Sr. A	36	5	20	25	24	—	—	—	—	—
1972–73	Kingston Aces	OHA Sr. A	31	2	9	11	20	—	—	—	—	—
NHL totals			20	1	1	2	4	0	0	0	0	0
