= Al Nicholson =

Canadian ice hockey player

- Born: April 26, 1936; Estevan, Saskatchewan, Canada
- Died: December 9, 1978 (aged 42)
- Height: 6 ft 1 in (185 cm)
- Weight: 180 lb (82 kg; 12 st 12 lb)
- Position: Left wing
- Shot: Left
- Played for: Boston Bruins
- Playing career: 1955–1972

Allan Douglas Nicholson (April 26, 1936 – December 9, 1978) was a Canadian ice hockey left winger. Born in Estevan, Saskatchewan, he played in 19 games for the Boston Bruins during the 1955–56 and 1956–57 seasons and recorded one assist. The rest of his career, which lasted from 1955 to 1972, was mainly spent in the minor Western Hockey League.

== Career statistics ==
=== Regular season and playoffs ===
			Regular season					Playoffs
Season	Team	League	GP	G	A	Pts	PIM	GP	G	A	Pts	PIM
1951–52	Estevan Miners	SIHA	—	—	—	—	—	—	—	—	—	—
1952–53	Humboldt Indians	SJHL	40	6	9	15	24	12	3	1	4	2
1953–54	Humboldt Indians	SJHL	47	18	22	40	59	5	1	0	1	10
1953–54	Humboldt Indians	M-Cup	—	—	—	—	—	5	1	1	2	2
1954–55	Humboldt Indians	SJHL	38	37	34	71	52	10	6	7	13	8
1954–55	Humboldt Indians	M-Cup	—	—	—	—	—	5	1	1	2	2
1955–56	Boston Bruins	NHL	14	0	0	0	4	—	—	—	—	—
1955–56	Hershey Bears	AHL	38	9	15	24	32	—	—	—	—	—
1956–57	Boston Bruins	NHL	5	0	1	1	0	—	—	—	—	—
1956–57	Hershey Bears	AHL	55	22	27	49	51	3	0	0	0	2
1957–58	Springfield Indians	AHL	61	14	19	33	38	13	0	2	2	10
1958–59	Vancouver Canucks	WHL	69	36	51	87	78	3	1	1	2	0
1959–60	Vancouver Canucks	WHL	71	21	34	55	22	—	—	—	—	—
1960–61	Winnipeg Warriors	WHL	70	15	33	48	51	—	—	—	—	—
1961–62	San Francisco Seals	WHL	70	25	35	60	8	2	1	1	2	0
1962–63	San Francisco Seals	WHL	70	27	35	62	4	17	5	9	14	6
1963–64	San Francisco Seals	WHL	69	24	30	54	31	11	6	8	14	4
1964–65	San Francisco Seals	WHL	70	28	30	58	37	—	—	—	—	—
1965–66	San Francisco Seals	WHL	70	23	28	51	23	7	1	0	1	0
1966–67	San Diego Gulls	WHL	72	25	27	52	24	—	—	—	—	—
1967–68	San Diego Gulls	WHL	72	28	33	61	23	7	3	2	5	4
1968–69	San Diego Gulls	WHL	74	22	33	55	49	7	3	5	8	4
1969–70	San Diego Gulls	WHL	72	28	25	53	14	6	1	5	6	10
1970–71	San Diego Gulls	WHL	72	28	44	72	27	6	2	1	3	8
1971–72	San Diego Gulls	WHL	72	26	36	62	26	4	0	0	0	2
WHL totals			993	356	474	830	417	70	23	32	55	38
NHL totals			19	0	1	1	4	—	—	—	—	—

== Awards and achievements ==
- WHL Championship (1963, 1964)
