= Don Ward (ice hockey) =

Canadian ice hockey player (1935–2014)

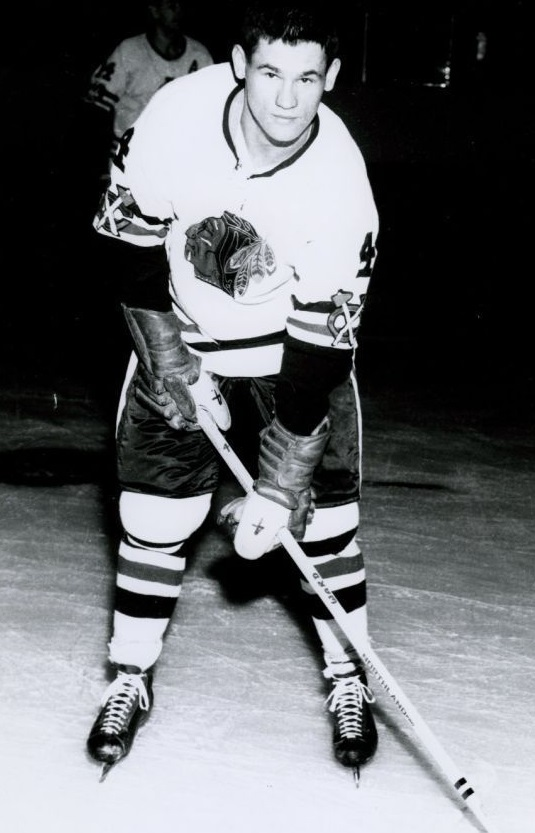
- Born: October 19, 1935; Sarnia, Ontario, Canada
- Died: January 6, 2014 (aged 78); Shoreline, Washington, United States
- Height: 6 ft 2 in (188 cm)
- Weight: 200 lb (91 kg; 14 st 4 lb)
- Position: Defence
- Shot: Left
- Played for: Chicago Black Hawks; Boston Bruins
- Playing career: 1956–1973

Donald Joseph Ward (October 19, 1935 – January 6, 2014) was a Canadian professional ice hockey defenceman. He played 34 games in the National Hockey League with the Chicago Black Hawks and Boston Bruins between 1957 and 1960. The rest of his career, which lasted from 1956 to 1973, was mainly spent with the Seattle Totems in the minor Western Hockey League.

== Early life ==
Ward was born on October 19, 1935, in Sarnia, Ontario, to Agnes and Joseph Ward.

== Playing career ==
Ward played 34 games in the National Hockey League for the Chicago Black Hawks and Boston Bruins in the late 1950s.

== Personal life ==
Ward is the father of Joe Ward, who also played professional ice hockey.

== Retirement and death ==
After retiring from hockey in following the 1972/73 season, Ward went to work for Ellstrom Manufacturing staying on until retiring in 2006.

He died on January 6, 2014, at the age of 78.

== Career statistics ==
=== Regular season and playoffs ===
| | | | Regular season | | | | | Playoffs |
| Season | Team | League | GP | G | A | Pts | PIM | GP | G | A | Pts | PIM |
|---|---|---|---|---|---|---|---|---|---|---|---|---|
| 1954–55 | Sarnia Legionnaires | WOJBHL | — | — | — | — | — | — | — | — | — | — |
| 1955–56 | Sarnia Legionnaires | WOJBHL | 36 | 17 | 24 | 41 | — | — | — | — | — | — |
| 1956–57 | Windsor Bulldogs | OHA Sr | 21 | 3 | 6 | 9 | 24 | — | — | — | — | — |
| 1956–57 | Buffalo Bisons | AHL | 31 | 3 | 6 | 9 | 48 | — | — | — | — | — |
| 1957–58 | Chicago Black Hawks | NHL | 3 | 0 | 0 | 0 | 0 | — | — | — | — | — |
| 1957–58 | Buffalo Bisons | AHL | 54 | 1 | 11 | 12 | 65 | — | — | — | — | — |
| 1958–59 | Calgary Stampeders | WHL | 64 | 4 | 18 | 22 | 131 | 8 | 1 | 4 | 5 | 8 |
| 1959–60 | Boston Bruins | NHL | 31 | 0 | 1 | 1 | 16 | — | — | — | — | — |
| 1959–60 | Providence Reds | AHL | 27 | 2 | 3 | 5 | 54 | 5 | 0 | 0 | 0 | 0 |
| 1960–61 | Winnipeg Warriors | WHL | 70 | 5 | 12 | 17 | 95 | — | — | — | — | — |
| 1961–62 | Seattle Totems | WHL | 70 | 7 | 23 | 30 | 91 | 2 | 0 | 0 | 0 | 4 |
| 1962–63 | Seattle Totems | WHL | 69 | 3 | 18 | 21 | 131 | 17 | 1 | 2 | 3 | 10 |
| 1963–64 | Seattle Totems | WHL | 70 | 5 | 25 | 30 | 122 | — | — | — | — | — |
| 1964–65 | Seattle Totems | WHL | 70 | 3 | 8 | 11 | 140 | 7 | 1 | 1 | 2 | 10 |
| 1965–66 | Seattle Totems | WHL | 56 | 5 | 8 | 13 | 84 | — | — | — | — | — |
| 1966–67 | Seattle Totems | WHL | 44 | 0 | 5 | 5 | 48 | 6 | 0 | 1 | 1 | 2 |
| 1967–68 | Seattle Totems | WHL | 70 | 2 | 12 | 14 | 107 | 9 | 1 | 2 | 3 | 14 |
| 1968–69 | Seattle Totems | WHL | 73 | 3 | 15 | 18 | 129 | 4 | 0 | 1 | 1 | 4 |
| 1969–70 | Seattle Totems | WHL | 72 | 3 | 17 | 20 | 96 | 6 | 0 | 2 | 2 | 20 |
| 1970–71 | Seattle Totems | WHL | 56 | 0 | 11 | 11 | 80 | — | — | — | — | — |
| 1971–72 | Seattle Totems | WHL | 41 | 1 | 8 | 9 | 82 | — | — | — | — | — |
| 1972–73 | Greensboro Generals | EHL | 13 | 0 | 1 | 1 | 30 | 7 | 1 | 2 | 3 | 24 |
| WHL totals | | | 825 | 41 | 180 | 221 | 1336 | 59 | 4 | 13 | 17 | 72 |
| NHL totals | | | 34 | 0 | 1 | 1 | 16 | — | — | — | — | — |
