= Larry Keenan =

Canadian ice hockey player (born 1940)

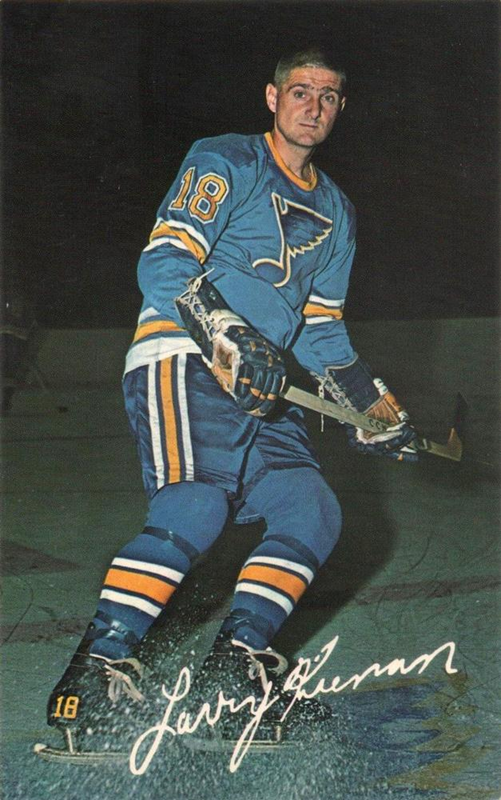
- Keenan with the St. Louis Blues in 1969
- Born: October 1, 1940 (age 85) North Bay, Ontario, Canada
- Height: 5 ft 10 in (178 cm)
- Weight: 177 lb (80 kg; 12 st 9 lb)
- Position: Left wing
- Shot: Left
- Played for: Toronto Maple Leafs; St. Louis Blues; Buffalo Sabres; Philadelphia Flyers
- Playing career: 1961–1974

Christopher Lawrence Keenan (born October 1, 1940) is a Canadian former professional ice hockey left wing. He played in the National Hockey League with the Toronto Maple Leafs, St. Louis Blues, Buffalo Sabres, and Philadelphia Flyers between 1962 and 1971.

== Playing career ==
In his NHL career, Keenan appeared in 234 games. He scored 38 goals and added 64 assists. He is 12th in the Blues all-time playoff scoring with 15 goals in 46 playoff games. He was called up for a pair of games with the Toronto Maple Leafs in 1961-62 before spending six years in the AHL and WHL. When the league expansion in 1967 made journeymen a desirable commodity, Keenan found himself back in the NHL with the St. Louis Blues. He formed a hard-working forward line with Terry Crisp and Jim Roberts.

Keenan scored the first-ever goal in St. Louis Blues history on October 11, 1967, against Cesare Maniago of the Minnesota North Stars. He scored in the first Blues home playoff game. As of 2026, Keenan is one of just four players in the expansion era to score a goal in the first home game of an expansion team in the regular season and the playoffs.

Keenan was also on the ice for Bobby Orr's famous 1970 Stanley Cup Finals clinching goal—a scoring play that began when Orr pinched at the blue line and blocked Keenan's attempt to clear the zone with a pass to Red Berenson.

Keenan was traded to the Buffalo Sabres on November 4, 1970, along with Jean-Guy Talbot for Bobby Baun. His career ended prematurely due to injuries.

== Life after NHL ==
Keenan went on to become president of the North Bay Trappers midget AAA and led the club for 23 years from 1986 to 2009. Keenan and manager Art Tiernay operated the club since the Great North Midget League was formed in 1986.

== Personal ==
Keenan grew up with three sisters. His son Cory played junior hockey for the Kitchener Rangers as a defenceman. Cory was drafted in the sixth round of the 1990 NHL entry draft by the Hartford Whalers, and ended up playing professionally in Europe. Cory was on the 1990 Memorial Cup all-star team. On June 29, 2023, his grandson (also named Larry) was drafted by the Detroit Red Wings to play at defense; he was the 117th draft pick of 2023, a higher selection than the projected 200th pick.

== Career statistics ==
=== Regular season and playoffs ===
			Regular season					Playoffs
Season	Team	League	GP	G	A	Pts	PIM	GP	G	A	Pts	PIM
1957–58	St. Michael's Buzzers	MetJBHL	—	—	—	—	—	—	—	—	—	—
1957–58	Toronto St. Michael's Majors	OHA	3	0	1	1	2	—	—	—	—	—
1958–59	Toronto St. Michael's Majors	OHA	48	17	12	29	24	15	5	4	9	0
1959–60	Toronto St. Michael's Majors	OHA	48	21	20	41	34	10	8	10	18	0
1960–61	Toronto St. Michael's Majors	OHA	48	31	38	69	41	20	24	13	37	8
1960–61	Toronto St. Michael's Majors	M-Cup	—	—	—	—	—	9	7	6	13	4
1961–62	Toronto Maple Leafs	NHL	2	0	0	0	0	—	—	—	—	—
1961–62	Rochester Americans	AHL	57	11	19	30	12	2	0	0	0	0
1962–63	Rochester Americans	AHL	64	11	28	39	24	2	0	1	1	0
1963–64	Denver Invaders	WHL	66	25	30	55	22	6	2	2	4	4
1964–65	Victoria Maple Leafs	WHL	67	35	20	55	27	12	5	2	7	8
1965–66	Victoria Maple Leafs	WHL	36	8	18	26	6	14	2	4	6	2
1966–67	Victoria Maple Leafs	WHL	17	4	10	14	6	—	—	—	—	—
1967–68	St. Louis Blues	NHL	40	12	8	20	4	18	4	5	9	4
1968–69	St. Louis Blues	NHL	46	5	9	14	6	12	4	5	9	8
1968–69	Kansas City Blues	CHL	7	3	1	4	0	—	—	—	—	—
1969–70	St. Louis Blues	NHL	56	10	23	33	8	16	7	6	13	0
1969–70	Kansas City Blues	CHL	6	6	2	8	0	—	—	—	—	—
1970–71	St. Louis Blues	NHL	10	1	3	4	0	—	—	—	—	—
1970–71	Buffalo Sabres	NHL	51	7	20	27	6	—	—	—	—	—
1971–72	Buffalo Sabres	NHL	14	2	0	2	2	—	—	—	—	—
1971–72	Philadelphia Flyers	NHL	14	1	1	2	2	—	—	—	—	—
1971–72	Richmond Robins	AHL	23	3	6	9	0	—	—	—	—	—
1972–73	Richmond Robins	AHL	35	15	18	33	8	3	1	0	1	0
1973–74	Richmond Robins	AHL	68	22	37	59	28	5	1	0	1	0
NHL totals			233	38	64	102	28	46	15	16	31	12
