= Gerry Odrowski =

Canadian ice hockey player

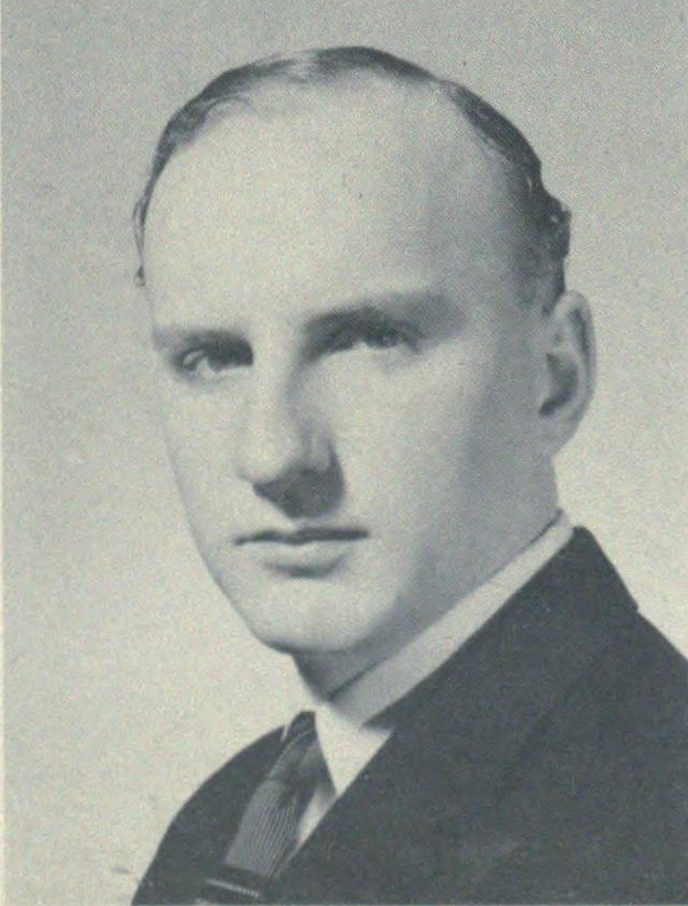
- Odrowski at St. Michaels College, c. 1957
- Born: October 4, 1938 (age 87) Trout Creek, Ontario, Canada
- Height: 5 ft 10 in (178 cm)
- Weight: 180 lb (82 kg; 12 st 12 lb)
- Position: Defence
- Shot: Left
- Played for: Detroit Red Wings; Oakland Seals; St. Louis Blues; Los Angeles Sharks; Phoenix Roadrunners; Minnesota Fighting Saints; Winnipeg Jets
- Playing career: 1959–1976

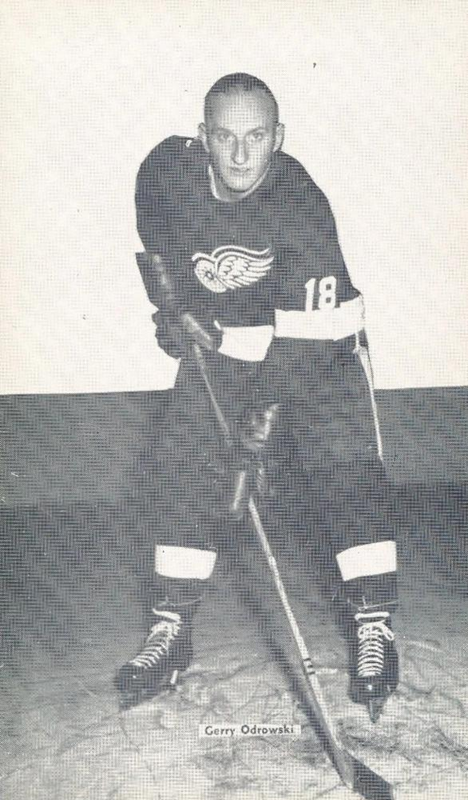
1960s postcard of Odrowski for Detroit Red Wings

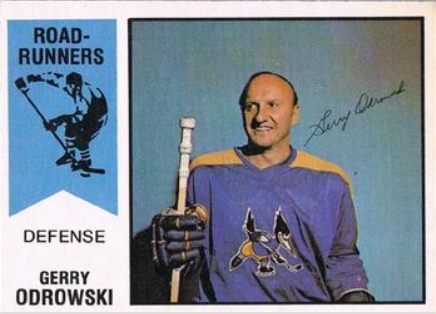
1974-75 card of Odrowski for Phoenix Roadrunners of the WHA

Gerald Bernard Odrowski (born October 4, 1938) is a Canadian former professional ice hockey defenceman who played 309 games in the National Hockey League and another 282 in the World Hockey Association. He played for the NHL's Detroit Red Wings, Oakland Seals and St. Louis Blues as well as the WHA's Los Angeles Sharks, Phoenix Roadrunners, Minnesota Fighting Saints and the Winnipeg Jets. Odrowski scored only 12 goals in his NHL career, but 7 of those goals were scored when his team was playing shorthanded.

== Career statistics ==
=== Regular season and playoffs ===
			Regular season					Playoffs
Season	Team	League	GP	G	A	Pts	PIM	GP	G	A	Pts	PIM
1955–56	Sunridge Beavers	OHA Int	—	—	—	—	—	—	—	—	—	—
1956–57	Toronto St. Michael's Majors	OHA	52	0	1	1	4	—	—	—	—	—
1957–58	Sault Ste. Marie Greyhounds	NOHA	48	4	7	11	20	1	0	0	0	0
1958–59	Sault Ste. Marie Greyhounds	NOHA	53	3	12	15	40	4	0	0	0	2
1959–60	Sudbury Wolves	EPHL	67	8	21	29	69	4	1	8	9	28
1960–61	Detroit Red Wings	NHL	68	1	4	5	45	10	0	0	0	4
1961–62	Detroit Red Wings	NHL	69	1	6	7	24	—	—	—	—	—
1962–63	Pittsburgh Hornets	AHL	69	7	23	30	125	—	—	—	—	—
1962–63	Detroit Red Wings	NHL	1	0	0	0	0	2	0	0	0	2
1963–64	Quebec Aces	AHL	8	0	0	0	25	—	—	—	—	—
1963–64	San Francisco Seals	WHL	37	3	12	15	70	11	0	3	3	30
1964–65	San Francisco Seals	WHL	70	9	20	29	114	—	—	—	—	—
1965–66	San Francisco Seals	WHL	71	7	24	31	102	7	0	0	0	4
1966–67	California Seals	WHL	72	8	27	35	64	6	0	1	1	10
1967–68	Vancouver Canucks	WHL	8	2	3	5	6	—	—	—	—	—
1967–68	California/Oakland Seals	NHL	42	4	6	10	10	—	—	—	—	—
1968–69	Oakland Seals	NHL	74	5	1	6	24	7	0	1	1	2
1969–70	San Diego Gulls	WHL	68	6	30	36	78	6	0	2	2	12
1970–71	Phoenix Roadrunners	WHL	70	7	28	35	56	10	0	5	5	13
1971–72	Phoenix Roadrunners	WHL	20	3	4	7	30	—	—	—	—	—
1971–72	St. Louis Blues	NHL	55	1	2	3	8	11	0	0	0	8
1972–73	Los Angeles Sharks	WHA	78	6	31	37	89	6	1	2	3	6
1973–74	Los Angeles Sharks	WHA	77	4	32	36	48	—	—	—	—	—
1974–75	Phoenix Roadrunners	WHA	77	5	38	43	77	5	0	2	2	0
1975–76	Minnesota Fighting Saints	WHA	37	1	12	13	10	—	—	—	—	—
1975–76	Winnipeg Jets	WHA	13	0	1	1	6	—	—	—	—	—
WHA totals			282	16	114	130	230	11	1	4	5	6
NHL totals			309	12	19	31	111	30	0	1	1	16
