= Don Head (ice hockey) =

Canadian ice hockey player

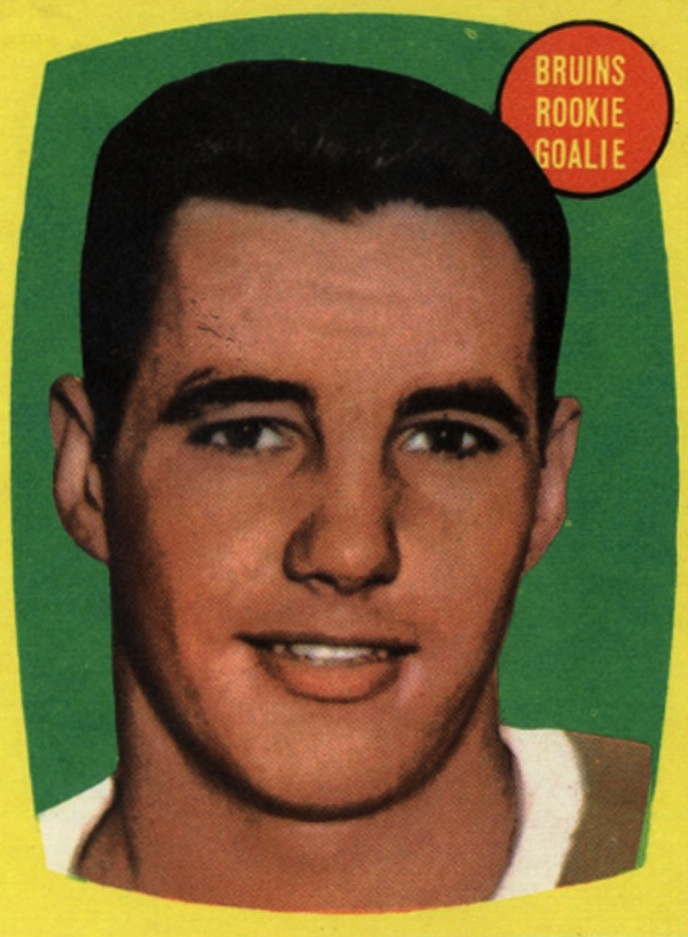
- Born: June 30, 1933 (age 93) York Township, Ontario, Canada
- Height: 5 ft 10 in (178 cm)
- Weight: 200 lb (91 kg; 14 st 4 lb)
- Position: Goaltender
- Caught: Left
- Played for: Boston Bruins
- Playing career: 1953–1971

Olympic medal record

Men's Ice hockey

Representing Canada
Silver medal – second place	1960 Squaw Valley	Team

Donald Charles Head (born June 30, 1933) is a Canadian former professional ice hockey player. He played 38 games in the National Hockey League with the Boston Bruins during the 1961–62 season. The rest of his career, which lasted from 1953 to 1971, was spent in the senior Ontario Hockey Association and the Western Hockey League. Head also played for the Canadian national team at the 1960 Winter Olympics, winning a silver medal.

== Playing career ==
=== Amateur career ===
Head, a goaltender, played junior hockey for the Toronto Marlboros where he won the Dave Pinkney Trophy for an outstanding goaltender in the 1952-53 season. He was the goalie for the Canadian ice hockey team at the 1960 Winter Olympics in Squaw Valley, California, which was expected to take home the gold medals, but settled for silver behind the United States.

=== Professional career ===
Following the Olympics, Head signed with the expansion Portland Buckaroos of the Western Hockey League. The Buckaroos would go on to win the league championship, and Head was named to the league all-star team and was chosen the league's rookie of the year and outstanding goalkeeper. He was among the very few goalies who did not wear a helmet in a game.

The next year, Head was called up to the NHL Boston Bruins but did not fare as well, winning only 9 of the 38 games he played as the Bruins finished last in the league. He returned to the WHL and won two more outstanding goalkeeper awards with the Buckaroos and was named to two more all-star teams. He also played for the Seattle Totems before ending his career with the Buckaroos in 1975, the same year the franchise folded.

== Legacy ==
Head was named to the Oregon Sports Hall of Fame in 1993.

== Career statistics ==
=== Regular season and playoffs ===
			Regular season									Playoffs
Season	Team	League	GP	W	L	T	MIN	GA	SO	GAA	SV%	GP	W	L	MIN	GA	SO	GAA	SV%
1950–51	Weston Dukes	OHA-B	—	—	—	—	—	—	—	—	—	—	—	—	—	—	—	—	—
1951–52	Toronto Marlboros	OHA	37	—	—	—	2220	107	4	2.87	—	—	—	—	—	—	—	—	—
1952–53	Weston Dukes	OHA-B	—	—	—	—	—	—	—	—	—	—	—	—	—	—	—	—	—
1953–54	Stratford Indians	OHA Sr	14	—	—	—	840	53	1	3.79	—	—	—	—	—	—	—	—	—
1954–55	Stratford Indians	OHA Sr	13	—	—	—	780	49	0	3.77	—	—	—	—	—	—	—	—	—
1955–56	Stratford Indians	OHA Sr	47	—	—	—	2820	186	3	3.96	—	6	—	—	360	25	0	4.17	—
1956–57	Windsor Bulldogs	OHA Sr	50	30	17	3	3000	144	6	2.88	—	12	—	—	720	50	0	4.17	—
1957–58	Chatham Maroons	NOHA	49	—	—	—	2940	168	3	3.43	—	—	—	—	—	—	—	—	—
1958–59	Chatham Maroons	NOHA	47	—	—	—	2820	152	6	3.23	—	10	—	—	600	27	1	2.70	—
1959–60	Windsor Bulldogs	OHA Sr	48	—	—	—	2860	138	3	2.90	—	17	—	—	1020	47	3	2.76	—
1960–61	Portland Buckaroos	WHL	70	38	23	9	4290	192	7	2.69	—	14	10	4	846	30	2	2.13	—
1961–62	Boston Bruins	NHL	38	9	26	3	2280	158	2	4.16	879	—	—	—	—	—	—	—	—
1961–62	Portland Buckaroos	WHL	5	3	1	1	300	16	0	3.20	—	—	—	—	—	—	—	—	—
1962–63	Portland Buckaroos	WHL	70	43	21	6	4200	178	4	2.54	—	7	3	4	423	22	0	3.12	—
1963–64	Portland Buckaroos	WHL	16	6	9	1	940	57	0	3.64	—	—	—	—	—	—	—	—	—
1964–65	Portland Buckaroos	WHL	51	26	20	4	3055	153	3	3.00	—	9	8	1	554	13	3	1.41	—
1965–66	Portland Buckaroos	WHL	36	20	12	3	2154	100	4	2.79	—	—	—	—	—	—	—	—	—
1966–67	Portland Buckaroos	WHL	44	26	13	5	2714	120	3	2.65	—	4	0	3	225	10	0	2.67	—
1967–68	Seattle Totems	WHL	46	23	19	4	2717	114	3	2.52	—	9	8	1	556	20	2	2.17	—
1968–69	Seattle Totems	WHL	44	22	13	4	2377	120	1	3.03	—	4	0	4	245	19	0	4.65	—
1969–70	Seattle Totems	WHL	20	8	10	2	1200	71	0	3.55	—	—	—	—	—	—	—	—	—
1970–71	Seattle Totems	WHL	16	4	7	3	769	45	0	3.51	—	—	—	—	—	—	—	—	—
WHL totals			418	219	148	42	25,083	1166	25	2.79	—	47	29	17	2849	114	7	2.40	—
NHL totals			38	9	26	3	2280	158	2	4.16	.879	—	—	—	—	—	—	—	—

=== International ===
Year	Team	Event	GP	W	L	T	MIN	GA	SO	GAA	SV%
1960	Canada	OLY	7	5	1	0	385	12	2	1.87	—
Senior totals			7	5	1	0	385	12	2	1.87	—
