= Bob Barlow =

Canadian ice hockey player

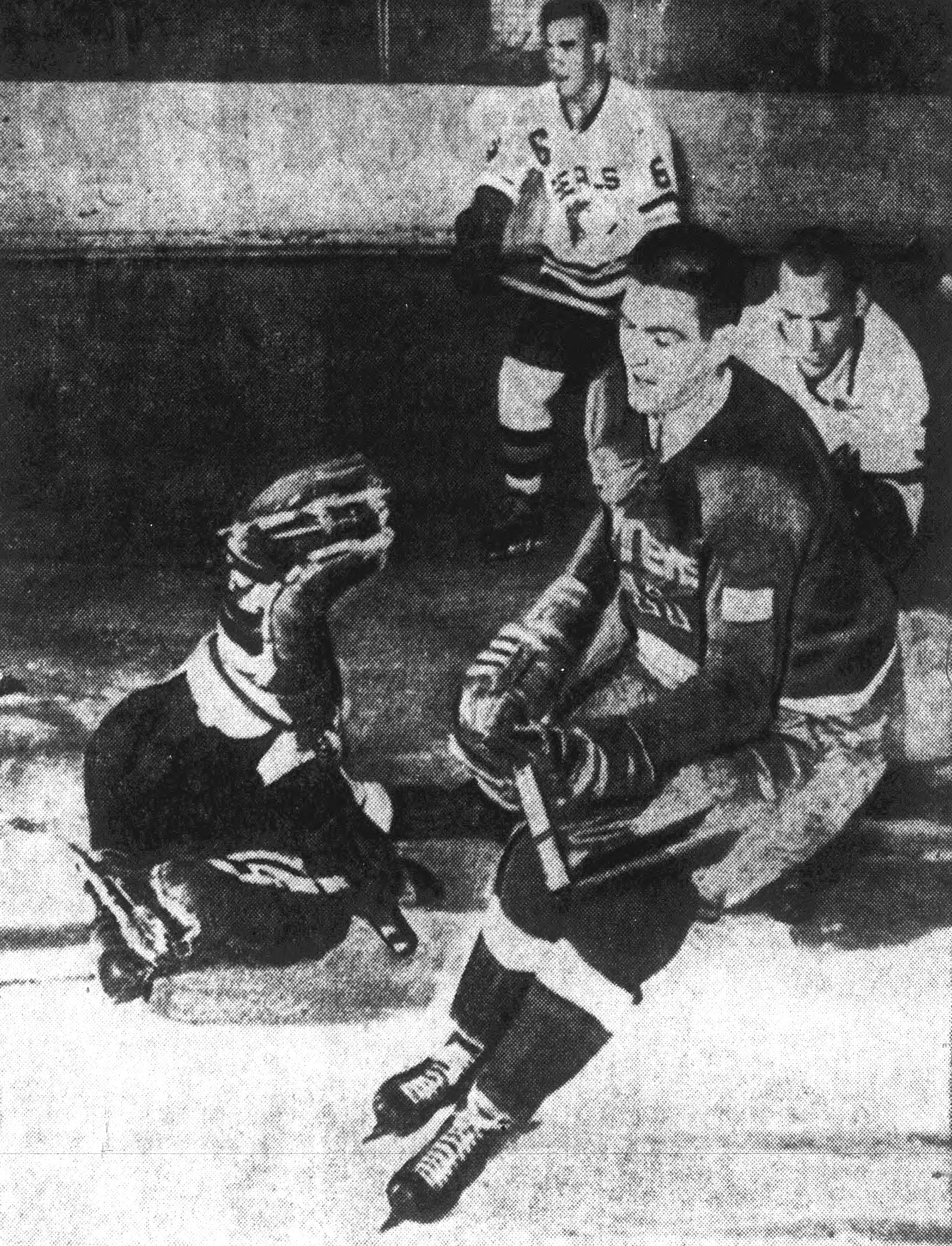
- Barlow (right, foreground) as a member of the Seattle Totems during a game on 13 March 1963.
- Born: June 17, 1935 (age 91) Hamilton, Ontario, Canada
- Height: 5 ft 10 in (178 cm)
- Weight: 167 lb (76 kg; 11 st 13 lb)
- Position: Left Wing
- Shot: Left
- Played for: Minnesota North Stars; Phoenix Roadrunners
- Playing career: 1955–1976

Robert George Barlow (born June 17, 1935) is a Canadian retired professional ice hockey player. He played 77 games in the National Hockey League with the Minnesota North Stars between 1969 and 1970, and 51 games in the World Hockey Association between 1974 and 1975. The rest of his career, which lasted from 1955 to 1976, was spent in various minor leagues.

== Playing career ==
Barlow was born in Hamilton, Ontario. He was the captain of the Vancouver Canucks of the Western Hockey League during the 1968–69 season. He played in 77 National Hockey League games with the Minnesota North Stars over parts of two seasons and 51 World Hockey Association games with the Phoenix Roadrunners during the 1974–75 season. He retired after that season and became the coach of the Tucson Mavericks in 1975–76. He played 2 games for the team, which marked the end of his playing career. Bob served as the captain of the Vancouver Canucks, where he won the WHL championship that led the Canucks into the NHL. He was one of the most potent scoring machines in that League, and for that matter, in most of the teams he played on. His career spanned twenty-four years in five professional Hockey leagues-NHL, WHL, AHL, CHL, WHA-accumulating a total of 1,052 points (including 522 goals)-one AHL Championship and four WHL Championships.

On Oct. 11, 1969, at the age of 34, Barlow made his NHL debut as a member of the Minnesota North Stars; becoming the oldest rookie to play a game in NHL history (to be eclipsed three years later, by 38-year-old Connie Madigan. He scored on his first shift, beating Bernie Parent of the Philadelphia Flyers. Bob scored his first NHL goal, on the first shot of his first shift after six seconds on the ice. This record fastest first goal remains the NHL record.

== Personal life ==
Barlow's daughter, Wendy Barlow, was an All-American tennis player at Brigham Young University. In addition, she played six years of professional tennis and was inducted into the Greater Victoria Sports Hall of Fame. His granddaughter, Hillary Pattenden, was an all-star-goaltender for the Mercyhurst Lakers women's ice hockey program. Bob and his wife Marilyn reside in Victoria, BC They have three daughters and five grandchildren.

== Career statistics ==
=== Regular season and playoffs ===
			Regular season					Playoffs
Season	Team	League	GP	G	A	Pts	PIM	GP	G	A	Pts	PIM
1953–54	Barrie Flyers	OHA	29	5	7	12	4	—	—	—	—	—
1954–55	Barrie Flyers	OHA	46	33	27	60	41	—	—	—	—	—
1954–55	Cleveland Barons	AHL	3	0	0	0	0	—	—	—	—	—
1955–56	Cleveland Barons	AHL	2	1	0	1	0	—	—	—	—	—
1955–56	North Bay Trappers	NOHA	56	20	18	38	56	10	2	2	4	4
1956–57	Cleveland Barons	AHL	3	0	2	2	2	—	—	—	—	—
1956–57	North Bay Trappers	NOHA	56	21	20	41	27	13	7	5	12	8
1957–58	Cleveland Barons	AHL	6	4	0	4	2	7	2	2	4	4
1957–58	North Bay Trappers	OHA Sr	60	27	36	63	39	—	—	—	—	—
1958–59	Cleveland Barons	AHL	70	27	27	54	39	7	1	2	3	20
1959–60	Quebec Aces	AHL	72	28	32	60	50	—	—	—	—	—
1960–61	Quebec Aces	AHL	67	12	17	29	41	—	—	—	—	—
1961–62	Quebec Aces	AHL	61	11	12	23	25	—	—	—	—	—
1962–63	Seattle Totems	WHL	70	47	30	77	17	17	8	9	17	10
1963–64	Seattle Totems	WHL	66	35	20	55	18	—	—	—	—	—
1964–65	Seattle Totems	WHL	70	30	17	47	50	7	3	2	5	10
1965–66	Victoria Maple Leafs	WHL	71	42	39	81	20	14	10	9	19	21
1966–67	Victoria Maple Leafs	WHL	70	21	38	59	44	—	—	—	—	—
1967–68	Rochester Americans	AHL	72	43	52	95	72	11	9	3	12	25
1968–69	Vancouver Canucks	WHL	74	36	48	84	50	8	4	6	10	11
1969–70	Minnesota North Stars	NHL	70	16	17	33	10	6	2	2	4	6
1970–71	Minnesota North Stars	NHL	7	0	0	0	0	—	—	—	—	—
1970–71	Phoenix Roadrunners	WHL	44	19	26	45	21	10	3	3	6	26
1971–72	Phoenix Roadrunners	WHL	64	16	21	37	24	5	0	1	1	2
1972–73	Phoenix Roadrunners	WHL	51	26	42	68	41	10	4	7	11	28
1973–74	Phoenix Roadrunners	WHL	48	19	30	49	12	9	6	5	11	6
1974–75	Phoenix Roadrunners	WHA	51	6	20	26	8	—	—	—	—	—
1974–75	Tulsa Oilers	CHL	25	7	12	19	10	2	0	1	1	2
1975–76	Tucson Mavericks	CHL	2	0	3	3	2	—	—	—	—	—
WHA totals			51	6	20	26	8	—	—	—	—	—
NHL totals			77	16	17	33	10	6	2	2	4	6
