= Connie Madigan =

Canadian ice hockey player (1934–2024)

- Born: October 4, 1934 Port Arthur, Ontario, Canada
- Died: January 2, 2024 (aged 89) Portland, Oregon, US
- Height: 5 ft 10 in (178 cm)
- Weight: 185 lb (84 kg; 13 st 3 lb)
- Position: Defence
- Shot: Left
- Played for: St. Louis Blues
- Playing career: 1955–1976

Cornelius Dennis "Mad Dog" Madigan (October 4, 1934 – January 2, 2024) was a Canadian professional ice hockey defenceman. He played 20 games in the National Hockey League with the St. Louis Blues during the 1972–73 season. The rest of his career, which lasted from 1955 to 1976, was spent in the minor leagues. Madigan was the oldest rookie in NHL history, aged 38.

== Biography ==
Cornelius Dennis Madigan was born in Port Arthur, Ontario on October 4, 1934. After playing several years in senior leagues in Ontario and British Columbia in the late 1950s, Madigan had a lengthy career as a minor league star, most notably with the Fort Wayne Komets of the International Hockey League for three seasons in the early 1960s, and then for the Portland Buckaroos of the Western Hockey League for nine seasons. He won accolades as First Team league All-Star in 1960, 1966, 1967, 1968 and 1969, Second Team All-Star in 1965, 1971 and 1972, as well as winning best defenceman honors in 1966.

Beset with numerous injuries in the 1972–73 season, the St. Louis Blues of the NHL bought Madigan's rights from the Buckaroos, and he suited up for the Blues in January 1973 at the age of 38, becoming the oldest rookie ever. He played competently for the Blues in twenty regular-season games and five playoff games, before finishing his career with Portland in parts of the two successive seasons.

At the time of his retirement, Madigan was second in minor league history in career penalty minutes. As of 2024, he is 77th in career penalty minutes.

In addition to Madigan's hockey career, he had a minor role in the 1977 cult classic movie Slap Shot as legendary hockey goon Ross "Mad Dog" Madison.

Madigan died in Portland on January 2, 2024, at the age of 89.

== Career statistics ==
=== Regular season and playoffs ===
			Regular season					Playoffs
Season	Team	League	GP	G	A	Pts	PIM	GP	G	A	Pts	PIM
1952–53	Port Arthur Bruins	TBJHL	27	4	3	7	67	—	—	—	—	—
1953–54	Port Arthur Bruins	TBJHL	26	2	11	13	124	9	1	2	3	18
1954–55	Port Arthur Bruins	TBJHL	34	7	11	18	168	—	—	—	—	—
1954–55	Humboldt Indians	SJHL	5	0	0	0	0	—	—	—	—	—
1955–56	Penticton Vees	OSHL	54	4	18	22	231	—	—	—	—	—
1956–57	Penticton Vees	OSHL	—	—	—	—	—	—	—	—	—	—
1957–58	Vernon Canadians	OSHL	8	0	3	3	34	—	—	—	—	—
1958–59	Vernon Maple Leafs	WIHL	50	4	24	28	145	11	2	4	6	24
1958–59	Spokane Spokes	WHL	3	1	1	2	2	—	—	—	—	—
1958–59	Nelson Maple Leafs	Al-Cup	—	—	—	—	—	7	0	3	3	12
1959–60	Fort Wayne Komets	IHL	66	7	50	57	272	13	0	3	3	44
1960–61	Cleveland Barons	AHL	8	0	2	2	13	—	—	—	—	—
1960–61	Fort Wayne Komets	IHL	57	9	28	37	231	8	2	3	5	26
1961–62	Fort Wayne Komets	IHL	2	0	0	0	9	—	—	—	—	—
1961–62	Spokane Comets	WHL	63	9	28	37	171	16	0	4	4	28
1962–63	Spokane Comets	WHL	48	7	15	22	115	—	—	—	—	—
1963–64	Los Angeles Blades	WHL	68	10	27	37	120	12	2	4	6	49
1964–65	Providence Reds	AHL	10	1	2	3	34	—	—	—	—	—
1964–65	Portland Buckaroos	WHL	60	11	20	31	158	10	1	4	5	18
1965–66	Portland Buckaroos	WHL	72	13	31	44	159	14	1	6	7	15
1966–67	Portland Buckaroos	WHL	72	9	42	51	147	4	2	1	3	6
1967–68	Portland Buckaroos	WHL	59	7	25	32	105	12	1	5	6	16
1968–69	Portland Buckaroos	WHL	71	3	25	28	175	10	1	8	9	22
1969–70	Dallas Black Hawks	CHL	10	1	4	5	26	—	—	—	—	—
1969–70	Portland Buckaroos	WHL	60	5	28	33	101	11	0	6	6	59
1970–71	Portland Buckaroos	WHL	72	8	59	67	175	3	0	3	3	38
1971–72	Portland Buckaroos	WHL	61	8	48	56	170	11	0	7	7	44
1972–73	St. Louis Blues	NHL	20	0	3	3	25	5	0	0	0	4
1972–73	Portland Buckaroos	WHL	42	3	26	29	146	—	—	—	—	—
1973–74	San Diego Gulls	WHL	39	3	19	22	80	—	—	—	—	—
1973–74	Portland Buckaroos	WHL	16	0	12	12	22	9	0	2	2	40
1974–75	Portland Buckaroos	WIHL	10	2	11	13	20	—	—	—	—	—
1975–76	Portland Buckaroos	NWHL	24	7	16	23	88	—	—	—	—	—
WHL totals			806	97	406	503	1846	112	8	50	58	335
NHL totals			20	0	3	3	25	5	0	0	0	4
