= Al Millar =

Canadian ice hockey player

- Born: September 18, 1929; Winnipeg, Manitoba, Canada
- Died: December 20, 1987 (aged 58); Broward County, Florida, USA
- Height: 5 ft 11 in (180 cm)
- Weight: 180 lb (82 kg; 12 st 12 lb)
- Position: Goaltender
- Caught: Left
- Played for: Boston Bruins
- Playing career: 1949–1970

Franklin Allan Millar (September 18, 1929 – December 20, 1987) was a Canadian professional ice hockey goaltender who played in six games in the National Hockey League with the Boston Bruins during the 1957–58 season. The rest of his career, which lasted from 1949 to 1970, was spent in various minor leagues. He was involved in the first trade in Philadelphia Flyers history when the Toronto Maple Leafs traded him to Philadelphia for cash on September 12, 1967.

== Career statistics ==
=== Regular season and playoffs ===
			Regular season									Playoffs
Season	Team	League	GP	W	L	T	MIN	GA	SO	GAA	SV%	GP	W	L	MIN	GA	SO	GAA	SV%
1947–48	Winnipeg Canadians	MJHL	17	10	4	2	1010	65	0	3.80	—	6	2	4	310	29	0	5.61	—
1948–49	Saint-Hyacinthe Flyers	QJAHA	28	14	12	1	1680	85	1	3.04	—	—	—	—	—	—	—	—	—
1948–49	Montreal Nationale	QJAHA	2	1	1	0	120	11	1	5.50	—	—	—	—	—	—	—	—	—
1948–49	Montreal Junior Canadiens	QJAHA	—	—	—	—	—	—	—	—	—	1	0	1	60	4	0	4.00	—
1949–50	Quebec Aces	QSHL	37	21	14	2	2250	109	2	2.91	—	13	7	6	780	35	2	2.69	—
1950–51	New Haven Eagles	AHL	19	3	16	0	1160	105	1	5.43	—	—	—	—	—	—	—	—	—
1950–51	Kansas City Royals	USHL	4	2	2	0	240	15	1	3.75	—	—	—	—	—	—	—	—	—
1950–51	Portland Eagles	PCHL	28	15	10	3	1680	95	0	3.39	—	—	—	—	—	—	—	—	—
1951–52	Shawinigan Catractes	QMHL	60	19	34	7	3680	200	5	3.26	—	—	—	—	—	—	—	—	—
1952–53	Quebec Aces	QSHL	4	1	3	0	240	22	0	5.50	—	—	—	—	—	—	—	—	—
1952–53	Charlottetown Islanders	MMHL	67	37	26	4	4038	200	6	3.01	—	18	9	9	1142	61	1	3.20	—
1953–54	Sudbury Wolves	NOHA	32	18	13	1	1920	120	2	3.75	—	4	3	1	250	8	0	1.92	—
1954–55	Sault Ste. Marie Indians	NOHA	60	27	27	6	3600	190	5	3.17	—	7	3	4	400	18	1	2.70	—
1955–56	Sault Ste. Marie Indians	NOHA	60	26	29	5	3600	207	3	3.45	—	7	3	4	420	22	0	3.14	—
1955–56	Quebec Aces	QSHL	3	2	1	0	180	8	1	2.67	—	7	3	4	426	20	0	2.82	—
1956–57	Quebec Aces	QSHL	65	38	20	7	3988	165	5	2.48	—	16	13	3	960	48	1	3.00	—
1957–58	Boston Bruins	NHL	6	1	4	1	360	25	0	4.17	.863	—	—	—	—	—	—	—	—
1957–58	Quebec Aces	QSHL	25	9	15	1	1500	97	0	3.88	—	13	7	6	827	28	2	2.03	—
1957–58	Buffalo Bisons	AHL	5	2	3	0	300	19	0	3.80	—	—	—	—	—	—	—	—	—
1957–58	Chicoutimi Sagueneens	QSHL	1	0	1	0	60	7	0	7.00	—	—	—	—	—	—	—	—	—
1957–58	Springfield Indians	AHL	14	2	9	3	873	56	1	3.85	—	5	3	2	—	—	—	—	—
1958–59	Quebec Aces	QSHL	62	21	33	8	3809	232	1	3.65	—		—	—	—	—	—	—	—
1959–60	Quebec Aces	QSHL	61	16	42	2	3660	273	2	4.48	—	—	—	—	—	—	—	—	—
1960–61	Hershey Bears	AHL	32	14	16	1	1894	90	2	2.85	—	—	—	—	—	—	—	—	—
1960–61	Sudbury Wolves	EPHL	2	2	0	0	120	7	0	3.50	—	—	—	—	—	—	—	—	—
1961–62	Seattle Totems	WHL	58	30	23	5	3540	182	3	3.08	—	2	0	2	119	6	0	3.03	—
1962–63	Seattle Totems	WHL	70	35	33	2	4200	232	0	3.31	—	17	9	8	1061	56	0	3.17	—
1963–64	Denver Invaders	WHL	70	44	23	3	4230	198	4	2.81	—	3	1	2	179	13	0	4.36	—
1964–65	Victoria Maple Leafs	WHL	64	31	31	2	3835	208	4	3.25	—	10	5	5	600	25	0	2.50	—
1965–66	Victoria Maple Leafs	WHL	51	29	18	4	3100	160	0	3.10	—	—	—	—	—	—	—	—	—
1965–66	Tulsa Oilers	CHL	16	8	5	3	960	43	1	2.69	—	11	4	7	694	47	1	4.06	—
1966–67	Tulsa Oilers	CHL	62	12	36	14	3732	241	1	3.87	—	—	—	—	—	—	—	—	—
1967–68	Quebec Aces	AHL	33	15	12	4	1771	100	1	3.39	—	5	3	2	298	18	0	3.62	—
1968–69	Vancouver Canucks	WHL	12	4	4	1	580	34	0	3.52	—	—	—	—	—	—	—	—	—
1969–70	Rochester Americans	AHL	11	3	8	0	577	52	0	5.41	—	—	—	—	—	—	—	—	—
NHL totals			6	1	4	1	360	25	0	4.17	.863	—	—	—	—	—	—	—	—
