= Cliff Schmautz =

Canadian ice hockey player

- Born: March 17, 1939; Saskatoon, Saskatchewan, Canada
- Died: February 11, 2002 (aged 62); Portland, Oregon, U.S.
- Height: 5 ft 9 in (175 cm)
- Weight: 170 lb (77 kg; 12 st 2 lb)
- Position: Right wing
- Shot: Right
- Played for: Buffalo Sabres; Philadelphia Flyers
- Playing career: 1959–1975

Clifford Harvey Schmautz (March 17, 1939 – February 11, 2002) was a Canadian professional ice hockey right wing. The majority of his career, which lasted from 1959 to 1975, was spent in the Western Hockey League with the Portland Buckaroos, where he played together with his brother Arnie Schmautz and scored forty goals three times and led the league in scoring in the 1965–66 season. He also played 56 games in the National Hockey League with the Buffalo Sabres and Philadelphia Flyers during the 1970–71 season. In his short NHL career, Schmautz scored thirteen goals and added nineteen assists. His younger brother Bobby Schmautz also played in the NHL.

Schmautz died on 11 February 2002 at the age of 62 due to complications from heart surgery.

== Career statistics ==
=== Regular season and playoffs ===
| | | | Regular season | | | | | Playoffs |
| Season | Team | League | GP | G | A | Pts | PIM | GP | G | A | Pts | PIM |
|---|---|---|---|---|---|---|---|---|---|---|---|---|
| 1956–57 | Saskatoon Quakers | SJHL | 47 | 9 | 10 | 19 | 65 | — | — | — | — | — |
| 1957–58 | Saskatoon Quakers | SJHL | 33 | 10 | 16 | 26 | 58 | — | — | — | — | — |
| 1958–59 | Moose Jaw Canucks | SJHL | 42 | 33 | 32 | 65 | 90 | — | — | — | — | — |
| 1958–59 | Nelson Maple Leafs | WIHL | 2 | 0 | 1 | 1 | 6 | — | — | — | — | — |
| 1959–60 | Omaha Knights | IHL | 63 | 32 | 20 | 52 | 91 | — | — | — | — | — |
| 1959–60 | Calgary Stampeders | WHL | 5 | 1 | 1 | 2 | 11 | — | — | — | — | — |
| 1960–61 | Sault Thunderbirds | EPHL | 70 | 32 | 20 | 52 | 91 | 12 | 7 | 6 | 13 | 4 |
| 1961–62 | Sault Thunderbirds | EPHL | 24 | 6 | 9 | 15 | 24 | — | — | — | — | — |
| 1961–62 | Buffalo Bisons | AHL | 43 | 14 | 13 | 27 | 29 | 4 | 0 | 0 | 0 | 12 |
| 1962–63 | Buffalo Bisons | AHL | 64 | 24 | 15 | 39 | 24 | 13 | 8 | 4 | 12 | 4 |
| 1963–64 | Buffalo Bisons | AHL | 26 | 3 | 7 | 10 | 6 | — | — | — | — | — |
| 1963–64 | Portland Buckaroos | WHL | 34 | 7 | 7 | 14 | 22 | 5 | 2 | 3 | 5 | 2 |
| 1964–65 | Portland Buckaroos | WHL | 66 | 17 | 42 | 59 | 84 | 10 | 3 | 2 | 5 | 0 |
| 1965–66 | Portland Buckaroos | WHL | 72 | 46 | 58 | 104 | 47 | 14 | 9 | 7 | 16 | 17 |
| 1966–67 | Portland Buckaroos | WHL | 66 | 28 | 29 | 57 | 53 | 4 | 2 | 1 | 3 | 2 |
| 1967–68 | Portland Buckaroos | WHL | 69 | 26 | 33 | 59 | 36 | 12 | 7 | 4 | 11 | 4 |
| 1968–69 | Portland Buckaroos | WHL | 53 | 27 | 29 | 56 | 28 | 11 | 10 | 4 | 14 | 4 |
| 1969–70 | Portland Buckaroos | WHL | 70 | 40 | 33 | 73 | 23 | 11 | 6 | 6 | 12 | 6 |
| 1970–71 | Buffalo Sabres | NHL | 26 | 5 | 7 | 12 | 10 | — | — | — | — | — |
| 1970–71 | Philadelphia Flyers | NHL | 30 | 8 | 12 | 20 | 23 | — | — | — | — | — |
| 1971–72 | Portland Buckaroos | WHL | 68 | 40 | 37 | 77 | 44 | 11 | 6 | 2 | 8 | 2 |
| 1972–73 | Portland Buckaroos | WHL | 54 | 30 | 21 | 51 | 47 | — | — | — | — | — |
| 1974–75 | Portland Buckaroos | WIHL | 34 | 11 | 8 | 19 | 8 | — | — | — | — | — |
| WHL totals | | | 557 | 262 | 290 | 552 | 395 | 78 | 45 | 29 | 74 | 37 |
| NHL totals | | | 56 | 13 | 19 | 32 | 33 | — | — | — | — | — |
