= 1962–63 WIHL season =

North American ice hockey season

1962–63 would have been the 17th season of the Western International Hockey League; however, the Trail Smoke Eaters had represented Canada, and won, at the 1961 World Ice Hockey Championships, and Spokane had placed a team (the Spokane Comets in the professional Western Hockey League commencing with the 1960–61 season. League play resumed for the 1963–64 WIHL season.
