= Bob Charlebois =

Canadian ice hockey player

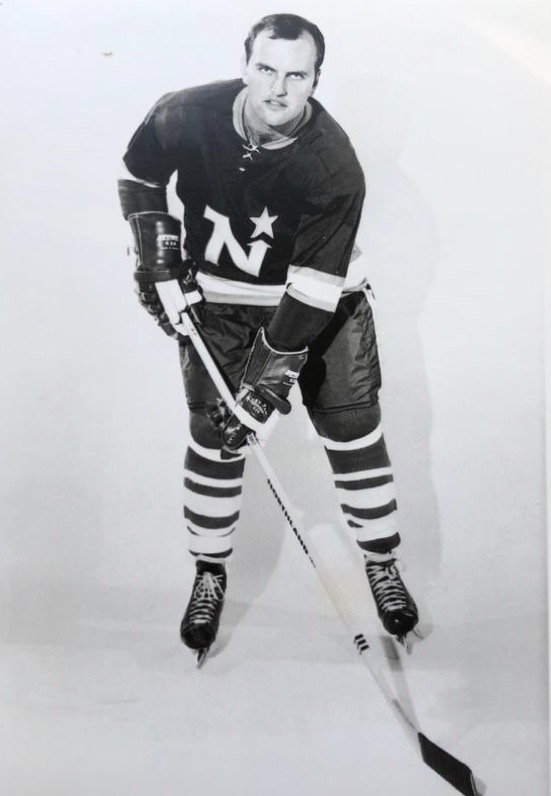
- Bob Charlebois Minnesota North Stars 1967-68
- Born: May 27, 1944 (age 82); Cornwall, Ontario, Canada
- Education: University of Ottawa, Harvard Business School
- Occupations: Professional Hockey Player; Academic Administrator
Ice hockey career
- Height: 5 ft 11 in (180 cm)
- Weight: 175 lb (79 kg; 12 st 7 lb)
- Position: Left wing
- Shot: Left
- Played for: Minnesota North Stars; Ottawa Nationals; New England Whalers
- Playing career: 1964–1976

Robert Richard Charlebois (born May 27, 1944) is a Canadian retired professional ice hockey forward and academic administrator. He played 7 games in the National Hockey League for the Minnesota North Stars during the 1967–68 season. He would also play 188 games in the World Hockey Association with the New England Whalers and Ottawa Nationals between 1972 and 1976. The rest of his career, which lasted from 1964 to 1976, was spent in various minor leagues.

Charlebois was a long time senior management executive at Algonquin College in Ottawa (1978-2008) and worked in the Continuing Education department of the University of Ottawa. He was named Best All-Around Junior Athlete (1963) of the City of Cornwall and is a member of the Cornwall Sports Hall of Fame (1996).

== Playing career – hockey ==
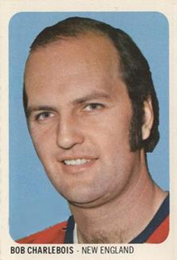
1973-74 Quaker Oats card of Charlebois in WHA

Charlebois developed his hockey skills with the local Cornwall Minor Hockey Association, and quickly moved through the midget level and Junior “B” ranks. He was scouted by the Canadiens organization, and played with St. Jerome of the Metro “A” league in 1960-61. The 16 year old went on to score 44 goals and assist on another 45, giving him second place in league scoring, which led to his selection to the All-Star team as well as being named Rookie of the Year. His team won the league championship.

The next three years of his career were spent with a top junior team in the country, the Montreal Junior Canadiens of the O.H.A. where he collected 179 points. His teammates included NHL Hall of Famers Jacques Laperriere, Serge Savard, Jacques Lemaire, Yvan Cournoyer, and Rogatien Vachon. He was scouted by Cliff Fletcher of the Canadiens and signed his first professional contract with General Manager Sam Pollock of the Canadiens.

At the age of 20, Charlebois turned pro with the Omaha Knights of the Central Professional Hockey League. He played in CPHL for four seasons with Omaha, Houston, and Memphis, scoring 99 goals. At the 1967 NHL Expansion Draft, he was traded to the Minnesota North Stars. He played seven games with the North Stars, scoring one goal, before being moved to the Western Hockey League's Phoenix Roadrunners where he recorded 31 goals and 30 assists to lead the team.

With the formation of the World Hockey Association in 1972, Charlebois found a new home with the Ottawa Nationals. His hard work and perseverance gave him a birth at the All-Star game after a season of 24 goals and 39 assists. He finished his professional playing career with the New England Whalers in Boston and Hartford.

== Coaching and scouting – hockey ==
After retiring as a professional hockey player, Charlebois relocated from Hartford to Ottawa. His first coaching job in 1976 was Head Coach of the University of Ottawa Men's Varsity Hockey Team. He also had successful years coaching the Bantam Ottawa West Golden Knights – championship (1992–93) and C.J.H.L. Junior A Gloucester Rangers Championship (1993–94).

Following his amateur coaching years, he worked for 10 years as a regional scout for the St. Michael's Majors OHL and the Kanata Stallions of the CJHL.

== University of Ottawa and Algonquin College ==
After completing his hockey career, Charlebois accepted the position of Head Coach Men's Varsity Hockey Team as well as administrator in the Department of Continuing Education at the University of Ottawa.

His experience at University of Ottawa led to an opportunity at Algonquin College and a lengthy and successful administrative career at the college (1978 – 2008). Charlebois started as Manager, Career Development at the Heron Campus of Algonquin College. He later moved on to Director of Corporate Training Center in the Continuing Education Department. His progress led to senior ranks at the college finishing his administrative career in the position of Vice President, Business Development of ACERRA, a division of Algonquin College.

During his career at Algonquin, Charlebois completed his master's degree in education at University of Ottawa. He was also selected and sponsored to attend the Harvard Business School in 1986. This program required Charlebois to leave his Ottawa residence to live on campus at the Business school. He received a diploma in management development.

== Personal life ==
Charlebois lives in Ottawa with his wife Maureen Delaney. He has two children Rob (Austin) and Jody (Toronto) from his previous marriage to Diane Levy.

== Career statistics ==
=== Regular season and playoffs ===
| | | | Regular season | | | | | Playoffs |
| Season | Team | League | GP | G | A | Pts | PIM | GP | G | A | Pts | PIM |
|---|---|---|---|---|---|---|---|---|---|---|---|---|
| 1960–61 | Saint-Jerome Alouettes | QJHL | 35 | 41 | 46 | 87 | — | — | — | — | — | — |
| 1961–62 | Montreal Junior Canadiens | OHA | 46 | 9 | 9 | 18 | 28 | 6 | 2 | 1 | 3 | 6 |
| 1962–63 | Montreal Junior Canadiens | OHA | 50 | 23 | 15 | 38 | 78 | 10 | 5 | 5 | 10 | 20 |
| 1963–64 | Montreal Junior Canadiens | OHA | 53 | 35 | 43 | 78 | 50 | 17 | 10 | 12 | 22 | 14 |
| 1964–65 | Omaha Knights | CPHL | 70 | 24 | 34 | 58 | 43 | 6 | 4 | 3 | 7 | 2 |
| 1965–66 | Houston Apollos | CPHL | 70 | 23 | 26 | 49 | 32 | — | — | — | — | — |
| 1966–67 | Houston Apollos | CPHL | 67 | 27 | 34 | 61 | 38 | 6 | 0 | 1 | 1 | 2 |
| 1967–68 | Minnesota North Stars | NHL | 7 | 1 | 0 | 1 | 0 | — | — | — | — | — |
| 1967–68 | Memphis South Stars | CPHL | 47 | 25 | 24 | 49 | 16 | — | — | — | — | — |
| 1967–68 | Phoenix Roadrunners | WHL | 15 | 2 | 8 | 10 | 4 | 4 | 1 | 2 | 3 | 0 |
| 1968–69 | Phoenix Roadrunners | WHL | 74 | 31 | 30 | 61 | 12 | — | — | — | — | — |
| 1969–70 | Phoenix Roadrunners | WHL | 73 | 24 | 34 | 58 | 12 | — | — | — | — | — |
| 1970–71 | Phoenix Roadrunners | WHL | 62 | 15 | 25 | 40 | 20 | 7 | 2 | 3 | 5 | 0 |
| 1971–72 | Tulsa Oilers | CHL | 6 | 0 | 0 | 0 | 4 | — | — | — | — | — |
| 1972–73 | Ottawa Nationals | WHA | 78 | 24 | 40 | 64 | 28 | 5 | 1 | 1 | 2 | 4 |
| 1973–74 | New England Whalers | WHA | 74 | 4 | 7 | 11 | 6 | 7 | 0 | 0 | 0 | 4 |
| 1974–75 | New England Whalers | WHA | 8 | 1 | 0 | 1 | 0 | 4 | 1 | 0 | 1 | 0 |
| 1974–75 | Cape Codders | NAHL | 60 | 24 | 57 | 81 | 54 | — | — | — | — | — |
| 1975–76 | New England Whalers | WHA | 28 | 3 | 3 | 6 | 0 | — | — | — | — | — |
| 1975–76 | Cape Codders | NAHL | 25 | 12 | 20 | 32 | 26 | — | — | — | — | — |
| 1975–76 | Broome Dusters | NAHL | 5 | 0 | 5 | 5 | 0 | — | — | — | — | — |
| WHA totals | | | 188 | 32 | 50 | 82 | 34 | 16 | 2 | 1 | 3 | 8 |
| NHL totals | | | 7 | 1 | 0 | 1 | 0 | — | — | — | — | — |
