= Dave Kelly (ice hockey, born 1943) =

Canadian ice hockey player

- Born: July 29, 1943 (age 83) Toronto, Ontario, Canada
- Height: 5 ft 8 in (173 cm)
- Weight: 165 lb (75 kg; 11 st 11 lb)
- Position: Goaltender
- Played for: Portland Buckaroos; Los Angeles Blades; San Diego Gulls
- Playing career: 1963–1976

Dave Kelly (born July 29, 1943) is a Canadian retired ice hockey goaltender.

== Early life ==
Kelly was born in Toronto, Ontario. He played junior hockey with the Toronto Neil McNeil Maroons and Toronto Knob Hill Farms.

== Career ==
Kelly played for several seasons in the Western Hockey League with the Portland Buckaroos. Kelly was a two-time winner of the WHL Outstanding Goaltender Award.
