= Don Head =

Don Head may refer to:

- Don Head (ice hockey) (born 1933), former professional ice hockey player
- Don Head (public servant), Canadian public servant
