= Charlebois =

Charlebois can refer to:

== People ==
- Bob Charlebois (1944), Canadian ice hockey player
- Lucie Charlebois, (1959), Canadian politician
- Robert Charlebois (1944), Canadian author, actor, composer, and singer
- Sylvain Charlebois (1970), Canadian researcher, food and agriculture expert

== Places ==
- Charlebois railway station in Charlebois, Manitoba, Canada

== Other uses ==
- Charlebois v. Saint John (City) a Supreme Court of Canada decision on language
