= Sandy Hucul =

Canadian ice hockey player, coach (1933–2022)

Alex "Sandy" Hucul (December 5, 1933 – February 6, 2022) was a former Canadian ice hockey player and coach.

Hucul was born in Eston, Saskatchewan. Hucul had a long playing career, turning professional in 1954 with the Calgary Stampeders of the Western Hockey League. He would remain with the WHL for almost his entire career (barring a partial season in 1957 with the Buffalo Bisons of the American Hockey League), playing for the Spokane Comets, the Victoria Maple Leafs and for his final five seasons, the Phoenix Roadrunners. He won the Hal Laycoe Cup as the league's best defenceman in 1968 and 1972, after which he retired as a player.

Hucul served an interim stint as the Roadrunners' head coach in 1970, and was named the permanent coach after his retirement, also serving as head coach of the WHA Roadrunners from 1974 to 1976 when the team joined the World Hockey Association, winning the Howard Baldwin Trophy as the coach of the year in 1975. A personality conflict led to his firing in 1976. After the Roadrunners left the league, he continued as coach for two more seasons in the Central and Pacific minor leagues until the team finally folded after the 1979 season. In the 1980s, Hucul survived a bout with rectal cancer. Hucul was a Christian.

Hucul died in Phoenix, Arizona, on February 6, 2022, and is survived by his loving & long-time wife Shirley, two daughters and two sons.

== Coaching record ==
Team	Year	Regular season						Postseason
Team	Year	G	W	L	T	Pts	Finish	Result
Phoenix Roadrunners	1974-75	78	39	31	8	76	4th in WHA West	Lost in quarter-finals
Phoenix Roadrunners	1975-76	80	39	35	6	84	2nd in WHA West	Lost in preliminary round
