= Lester Patrick Cup =

Western CAN-AM ice hockey championship (1949–74)

The Lester Patrick Cup was the championship trophy of the Pacific Coast Hockey League and the Western Hockey League (WHL) from 1949 to 1974. Originally known as the Phil Henderson Cup and then in 1952 it was renamed to the President's Cup. The trophy was again renamed in 1960 to honour Pacific coast hockey pioneer Lester Patrick following his death on June 1 of that year.

The Lester Patrick Cup was retired following the demise of the WHL, and is on display at the Hockey Hall of Fame in Toronto, Ontario, Canada.

== Winners ==
Pacific Coast Hockey League

Season	Winner
1944–45	Seattle Ironmen
1945–46	Vancouver Canucks
1946–47	Los Angeles Monarchs
1947–48	Vancouver Canucks
1948–49	San Diego Skyhawks
1949–50	New Westminster Royals
1950–51	Victoria Cougars
1951–52	Saskatoon Quakers

Following the merger of the PCHL with the Western Canada Senior Hockey League in 1951, the league renamed itself the Western Hockey League for the 1952–53 season.

Western Hockey League

Season	Winner
1952–53	Edmonton Flyers
1953–54	Calgary Stampeders
1954–55	Edmonton Flyers
1955–56	Winnipeg Warriors
1956–57	Brandon Regals
1957–58	Vancouver Canucks
1958–59	Seattle Totems
1959–60	Vancouver Canucks
1960–61	Portland Buckaroos
1961–62	Edmonton Flyers
1962–63	San Francisco Seals
1963–64	San Francisco Seals
1964–65	Portland Buckaroos
1965–66	Victoria Maple Leafs
1966–67	Seattle Totems
1967–68	Seattle Totems
1968–69	Vancouver Canucks
1969–70	Vancouver Canucks
1970–71	Portland Buckaroos
1971–72	Denver Spurs
1972–73	Phoenix Roadrunners
1973–74	Phoenix Roadrunners
