= Spokane Comets =

- City: Spokane, Washington
- League: Western Hockey League
- Operated: 1959–63
- Home arena: Spokane Coliseum
- Colours: Blue, red and white
- Owner(s): Mel Smith
- Affiliate: Montreal Canadiens

Franchise history
- 1958–1959: Spokane Spokes
- 1959–1963: Spokane Comets
- 1963–1964: Denver Invaders
- 1964–1967: Victoria Maple Leafs
- 1967–1974: Phoenix Roadrunners (WHL)
- 1974–1977: Phoenix Roadrunners (WHA)

The Spokane Comets were a minor professional ice hockey team that was located in Spokane, Washington. They played in the Western Hockey League (WHL) from 1959 to 1963.

== History ==
In April 1961, the franchise considered a move to San Francisco in view of the financial loss of the previous three years but, after several meetings, it remained in Spokane.

The 1962-63 team was coached by Roy McBride who piloted the team to a 30-38-2 record.

In June 1963 the Spokane franchise was purchased by a group led by the Toronto Maple Leafs of the National Hockey League which relocated them to become the Denver Invaders and act as their farm team. Spokane quickly generated the Spokane Jets, which commenced play in the Western International Hockey League in the 1963–64 WIHL season.

The previous hockey team to play in Spokane had been the Spokane Flyers, who played in the senior amateur WIHL until the pro Flyers joined the WHL as the Spokane Spokes. The pro team's nickname was changed to the Comets in 1959–60.

== Season-by-season records ==
All seasons played in Spokane included.

Season	GP	W	L	T	Pts	GF	GA	Finish	Playoffs
1958-59	70	26	38	6	58	217	275	4th	Lost opening round
1959-60	70	19	48	3	41	201	324	7th	out of playoffs
1960-61	70	33	34	3	69	247	258	5th	Lost Quarter Final
1961-62	70	37	28	5	79	272	242	2nd South	Lost Final
1962-63	70	30	38	2	62	219	252	4th South	out of playoffs

== Comets who played in the NHL ==
- Norm Beaudin
- Gilles Boisvert
- Gerry Brisson
- Don Cherry
- Roy Edwards
- Bill Folk
- Emile Francis
- Bill Johansen
- Earl Johnson
- Eddie Johnston
- Forbes Kennedy
- Connie Madigan
- Cesare Maniago
- Seth Martin
- Ernie Wakely
- Carl Wetzel
- Steve Witiuk
