= Victoria Memorial Arena =

Ice hockey arena in Victoria, British Columbia

- "The Barn on Blanshard"
- Interactive map of Victoria Memorial Arena
- Address: 1925 Blanshard Street
- Location: Victoria, British Columbia, Canada
- Coordinates: 48°25′53″N 123°21′37″W
- Capacity: 5,000

Construction
- Opened: 1949
- Closed: 2003

Tenants
- Victoria Shamrocks (WLA) (1950–2003); Victoria Maple Leafs (WHL) (1964–1967); Victoria Cougars (WHL) (1971–1994); Victoria Salsa (BCHL) (1994–2003)

Victoria Memorial Arena was an ice hockey arena in Victoria, British Columbia, Canada. It was built in 1949 and demolished in 2003 due to poor acoustics and climbing maintenance costs.

Its nickname, the "Barn on Blanshard", was due to its design (rectangular with a curved roof, resembling a barn or aircraft hangar).

The Victoria Shamrocks of the Western Lacrosse Association began play in 1950, one year after the arena's opening.

The Victoria Maple Leafs of the Western Hockey League played in the arena in the 1960s.

The arena hosted the Victoria Cougars of the Western Hockey League between 1971 and 1994, when the team moved to Prince George. Afterward, the arena hosted the Victoria Salsa of the British Columbia Hockey League from 1994 to 2004.

The replacement, Save-On-Foods Memorial Centre, now occupies the site. In 2004, the Jim Pattison Group agreed to pay $125,000 per year for 10 years to the City of Victoria for the Save-On-Foods name rights on Victoria's new arena, amidst unpopular public opinion.
