= Victoria Maple Leafs =

- City: Victoria, British Columbia
- League: Western Hockey League
- Operated: 1964-67
- Home arena: Victoria Memorial Arena
- Colours: Blue and white
- Owner(s): Maple Leaf Gardens Limited
- Affiliate: Toronto Maple Leafs

Franchise history
- 1958–1959: Spokane Spokes
- 1959–1963: Spokane Comets
- 1963–1964: Denver Invaders
- 1964–1967: Victoria Maple Leafs
- 1967–1974: Phoenix Roadrunners (WHL)
- 1974–1977: Phoenix Roadrunners (WHA)

The Victoria Maple Leafs were a minor professional ice hockey team in the Western Hockey League (WHL) that played three seasons in Victoria, British Columbia, beginning in 1964. They were the farm team of the Toronto Maple Leafs. The previous season the team had played as the Denver Invaders, with the best regular season record in the WHL, and from 1959 to 1963 the team had played as the Spokane Comets. In 1967 they became the Phoenix Roadrunners.

== History ==
Victoria had had a baseball team named the Maple Leafs in 1915. The Victoria Cougars entered the WHL as an expansion team for the 1949–50 season, but in 1961 they moved to Los Angeles to become the Blades.

In 1964 it was announced that the Denver Invaders of the WHL would be relocated to Victoria after Denver had failed to reach a 2,000 season ticket target before the June 19 deadline the league had imposed. The team, which was owned by the Toronto Maple Leafs of the National Hockey League, had lost a reported $150,000 in their first season. The team became known as the Victoria Maple Leafs for the following season.

The team logo was a stylized blue maple leaf, with the words "Victoria Maple Leafs" on it. They played in the Victoria Memorial Arena which opened in 1949 and sat 5033 spectators. Andy Stephen called the games for local radio station CKDA. Fans of the team were well known for chanting the parent-team's cheer, "Go Leafs Go!"

In June 1967, Maple Leaf Gardens Limited sold the team for $500,000 to a group from Phoenix which relocated it to become the Roadrunners, where they played until the WHL's demise in 1974. In Phoenix, the franchise won the last two WHL championships in 1973 and 1974. The Roadrunners then competed in the World Hockey Association in 1974-75 using essentially the same team from the previous year.

== 1964-65 season ==
The Maple Leafs finished the 1964–65 season with a 32–36–2 W-L-T record in fourth place in the six-team league, making the WHL playoffs. Milan Marcetta led the team in scoring with 34 goals and 46 assists, and Larry Keenan scored 35 goals. Victoria sported four 30-goal scorers. Journeyman goaltender Al Millar played 63 games and future NHL goaltender Gary Smith also played in seven. The Leafs beat the Seattle Totems in a seven-game semi-final, but lost to the Portland Buckaroos in five games for the championship.

Millar played 10 playoff games in goal, with Jean-Guy Morissette playing the other two.

== 1965-66 season ==
In the 1965–66 season, the Maple Leafs defeated the San Francisco Seals in a seven-game semi-final, to set up a rematch of the previous year's final. They beat the regular season champion Buckaroos in seven games to capture their only Lester Patrick Cup in Victoria and the first for the franchise going back to Denver and Spokane.

They finished the regular season in second place, with a 40–28–4 record under coach Frank Mario. Milan Marcetta repeated as team scoring leader with 28 goals and 54 assists. Bob Barlow scored 42 goals and added 39 assists, Lou Jankowski scored 32 and Andy Hebenton added 31. Marcetta got 7 goals and 13 assists to win the playoff scoring title and Barlow scored another 10 goals and 9 assists tying Portland's Art Jones for second place in playoff scoring.

Barlow earned a place on the WHL First All-Star team.

Journeyman Al Millar started 51 games as goaltender before being sent to the Tulsa Oilers of the CPHL and John Henderson played in 24. With Millar gone, Henderson started all 14 playoff games.

== 1966-67 season ==
In their last season in the WHL, the Maple Leafs finished out of the playoffs with a fifth-place 30–34–8 W-L-T record. Buck Houle was the general manager and Frank Mario was the coach. Milan Marcetta continued as the team's top goal and point scorer with 40 goals and 35 assists. Bruce Carmichael added 30 goals. Gary Smith started 17 games for Victoria in the net. Al Smith had started the season with Toronto but arrived in time to play 55 games for Victoria. Al Smith went on to play in the NHL with Toronto and five other teams over nine seasons, as well as the New England Whalers of the WHA.

Marcetta's output in Victoria earned him a trip to Toronto to play three playoff games for the 1967 Stanley Cup champion Toronto Maple Leafs where his name is engraved on the Stanley Cup.

== Season-by-season record ==
Note: GP = Games played, W = Wins, L = Losses, T = Ties, Pts = Points, GF = Goals for, GA = Goals against, PIM = Penalties in minutes

Season	GP	W	L	T	Pts	GF	GA	PIM	Finish	Playoffs
1964-65	70	32	36	2	66	246	242	926	4th	Lost final (Portland Buckaroos)
1965-66	72	40	28	4	84	260	243	735	2nd	Won Lester Patrick Cup
1966-67	72	30	34	8	68	224	232	613	5th	Did not qualify
Totals	214	102	98	14	218	730	717	2274		
