= Phoenix Roadrunners (WHL) =

Defunct minor professional ice hockey team

- City: Phoenix, Arizona
- League: Western Hockey League
- Operated: 1967–74
- Home arena: Arizona Veterans Memorial Coliseum
- Colors: Blue, yellow and white

Franchise history
- 1958–1959: Spokane Spokes
- 1959–1963: Spokane Comets
- 1963–1964: Denver Invaders
- 1964–1967: Victoria Maple Leafs
- 1967–1974: Phoenix Roadrunners (WHL)
- 1974–1977: Phoenix Roadrunners (WHA)

The Phoenix Roadrunners were a professional ice hockey team in Phoenix, Arizona. They were a member of the Western Hockey League from 1967 to 1974. After the 1974 season, the franchise moved to the World Hockey Association. The team played at the Arizona Veterans Memorial Coliseum, aka “The Madhouse on McDowell.”

== History ==
The franchise originally competed in the Western Hockey League (WHL) from 1967 to 1974. The team was established after a group from Phoenix purchased the Victoria Maple Leafs in June 1967 from Maple Leaf Gardens Limited for $500,000 and relocated the team from Victoria, British Columbia, where they had played for the three previous seasons, to become the Roadrunners.

They won the championship trophy, the Lester Patrick Cup, twice during their tenure in the WHL (1972–73 and 1973–74). In 1974 they joined the WHA with their roster mostly intact when the minor pro WHL ceased operations.

== Notable players WHL 1967–74 ==
- Jim Murray – played 364 games in 5 seasons on defence, scored 211 points
- Harry Shaw – played 335 games in 6 seasons on defence
- Larry Lund – scored 261 points in 203 games over 3 seasons
- Alex "Sandy" Hucul – played 308 games over 5 seasons, won Hal Laycoe Cup (best defenceman) in 1968 and 1972; coached the WHA team in 1974
- Andre Hinse – scored 143 goals and 313 points in 277 games over 4 seasons
- Wayne Hicks – finished career in Phoenix with 218 points in 275 games
- Bob Charlebois – scored 169 points in 224 games
- Bob Barlow – scored 199 points in 207 games
- Howie Young – for 3 of his 23 professional seasons, scored 170 points in 190 games, 1st Team All-Star 1974
