= Denver Invaders =

- City: Denver, Colorado
- League: Western Hockey League
- Operated: 1963–64
- Home arena: Denver Coliseum
- Colors: Red and blue
- Owner: Maple Leaf Gardens Limited
- Affiliates: Toronto Maple Leafs

Franchise history
- 1958–1959: Spokane Spokes
- 1959–1963: Spokane Comets
- 1963–1964: Denver Invaders
- 1964–1967: Victoria Maple Leafs
- 1967–1974: Phoenix Roadrunners (WHL)
- 1974–1977: Phoenix Roadrunners (WHA)

The Denver Invaders were a minor professional ice hockey team that played in Denver, Colorado in the Western Hockey League (WHL) during the 1963–1964 season. In June 1963, the Spokane Comets WHL franchise was purchased by a group led by the Toronto Maple Leafs of the National Hockey League which relocated them to Denver to act as their farm team. Though the league did not acknowledge that the Maple Leafs had an ownership stake in the team, they held a majority position with the Denver partners only owning roughly 36%.

They played their regular season games at the Denver Coliseum, and their playoff games at the arena at the University of Denver. The head coach was Rudy Pilous, who had been fired the year before from the head coaching job with the NHL Chicago Black Hawks.

In the 1963–64 season the Invaders won the regular season championship with the best record in the Western Hockey League, and as such was awarded the WHL Governor's Trophy. The Invaders would lose to the Los Angeles Blades in the playoffs.

Following reported losses of $150,000 in their first season, Stafford Smythe, owner of the Maple Leafs, announced that the team would be relocated after the city failed to reach a 2,000 season ticket target before the June 19 deadline the league had imposed. The team became the Victoria Maple Leafs for the following season.
