= 1960–61 WHL season =

- League: Western Hockey League
- Sport: Ice hockey
- Number of games: 70
- Number of teams: 8

Regular season
- Season champions: Calgary Stampeders
- Season MVP: Lou Jankowski (Calgary)
- Top scorer: Art Jones (Portland)

Lester Patrick Cup
- Champions: Portland Buckaroos
- Runners-up: Seattle Totems

Seasons
- ← 1959–60 1961–62 →

The 1960–61 WHL season was the ninth season of the Western Hockey League. The Portland Buckaroos were the Lester Patrick Cup champions as they beat the Seattle Totems four games to two in the final series.

Lester Patrick died on June 1, 1960, and in honour of him the WHL voted to rename the championship trophy from the President's Cup to the Lester Patrick Cup.

The Portland Buckaroos joined the league, and the eight teams played in one division.

Lou Jankowski of Calgary set a league record with 57 goals, and was named most valuable player. Art Jones of Portland won the scoring title with 100 points, one more than Jankowski.

== Teams ==
1960–61 Western Hockey League
Team	City	Arena	Capacity
Calgary Stampeders	Calgary, Alberta	Stampede Corral	6,475
Edmonton Flyers	Edmonton, Alberta	Edmonton Stock Pavilion	6,000
Portland Buckaroos	Portland, Oregon	Memorial Coliseum	12,000
Seattle Totems	Seattle, Washington	Civic Ice Arena	5,000
Spokane Comets	Spokane, Washington	Spokane Coliseum	5,400
Vancouver Canucks	Vancouver, British Columbia	PNE Forum	5,050
Victoria Cougars	Victoria, British Columbia	Victoria Memorial Arena	5,000
Winnipeg Warriors	Winnipeg, Manitoba	Winnipeg Arena	9,500

=== Map of teams ===
WHL Teams

== Final standings ==
League Standings
R	Team	GP	W	L	T	GF	GA	Pts
**1**	**Calgary Stampeders**	**70**	**44**	**22**	**4**	**300**	**215**	**92**
**2**	**Portland Buckaroos**	**70**	**38**	**23**	**9**	**242**	**192**	**85**
**3**	**Vancouver Canucks**	**70**	**38**	**29**	**3**	**208**	**191**	**79**
**4**	**Seattle Totems**	**70**	**37**	**28**	**5**	**262**	**222**	**79**
**5**	**Spokane Comets**	**70**	**33**	**34**	**3**	**247**	**258**	**69**
**6**	**Victoria Cougars**	**70**	**27**	**41**	**2**	**220**	**267**	**56**
7	Edmonton Flyers	70	27	43	0	229	295	54
8	Winnipeg Warriors	70	21	45	4	191	259	46

bold – qualified for playoffs

== Playoffs ==
=== Playoff bracket ===
Quarterfinals
2	Portland Buckaroos	3
5	Spokane Comets	1
3	Vancouver Canucks	3
6	Victoria Cougars	2

Semifinals
1	Calgary Stampeders	1
4	Seattle Totems	4
2	Portland Buckaroos	3
3	Vancouver Canucks	1

Finals
2	Portland Buckaroos	4
4	Seattle Totems	2

The final, between Portland and Seattle, was the first in league history to feature two American teams. The Portland Buckaroos defeated the Seattle Totems 4 games to 2 to win the Lester Patrick Cup.

== Bibliography ==
- Stott, Jon C. (2008), Ice Warriors: The Pacific Coast/Western Hockey League 1948–1974, Surrey, British Columbia: Heritage House Publishing, ISBN 978-1-894974-54-7
