= Los Angeles Blades (WHL) =

Hockey team in Los Angeles, United States

The Los Angeles Blades were a minor league hockey team which played in the Western Hockey League from 1961 to 1967.

== History ==
Following the 1960–61 season, Spokane Comets owner Mel Smith informed the WHL that he was considering moving his team to either Los Angeles or San Francisco. At the same time, Los Angeles Sports Arena general manager Bill Nicholas revealed that he intended to affiliate with the WHL if he could not gain an NHL franchise. As a result, the WHL evaluated both the Sports Arena and the Cow Palace near San Francisco to evaluate their readiness for possible expansion.

On April 23, 1961, the WHL approved the transfer of the Victoria Cougars to a Los Angeles–based ownership group headed by James Piggott and Los Angeles Rams owner Dan Reeves. The WHL also approved a conditional expansion franchise on the same day, the San Francisco Seals, creating an all-California rivalry that would begin in October 1961.

After finishing 25-39-6 in their inaugural season, the Blades improved to 35-32-3 in 1962–63, led by coach Jack Bownass and fleet left wing Willie O'Ree, the NHL's first black player. Los Angeles won its playoff opener over San Francisco, only to lose the next two games and the best-of-three series to the Seals.

The Blades' breakout year came in 1963–64, when Alf Pike took over as coach. While Los Angeles finished at .500 (31-31-8), the Blades would make it all the way to the WHL finals, where the San Francisco Seals defeated Los Angeles in six games.

Pike's biggest impact on the Blades came when he shifted O'Ree - who'd lost the vision in his right eye to a puck during his junior hockey days – from left wing to right. O'Ree went on to become one of the WHL's most exciting players and prolific scorers, improving from 17 goals in 1963–64 to 38 in 1964–65 and scoring 30 or more goals in three consecutive seasons in Los Angeles. But the Blades were unable to match O'Ree's artistry, failing to make the playoffs in their final three seasons in the WHL.

On Feb. 9, 1966, the National Hockey League – sensing a possible merger between the WHL and the American Hockey League – awarded expansion franchises to Los Angeles, Minneapolis, Philadelphia, Pittsburgh, St. Louis and San Francisco for the 1967–68 season. Jack Kent Cooke was awarded the Los Angeles franchise, which would be called the Kings; the Blades played their final game in April 1967.

The Blades name was used again – once for a short-lived franchise in the Pacific Hockey League from 1978 to 1979 and again for a franchise in Roller Hockey International from 1993 to 1997; as well, in 1985, a team called the Los Angeles Blades was organized as the first gay hockey team in the United States. The last link to the Los Angeles Blades is the Saskatoon Blades of the major junior Western Hockey League, founded as a feeder team for Los Angeles in 1964; the Saskatoon club wore hand-me-down Los Angeles Blades uniforms into the 1970s.

== See also ==
- Los Angeles Blades players
- Ice hockey in Los Angeles
- Ice hockey teams in California
