= 1966–67 WHL season =

- League: Western Hockey League
- Sport: Ice hockey
- Games: 72
- Teams: 7

Regular season
- Season champions: Portland Buckaroos
- Season MVP: Billy McNeill (Vancouver)
- Top scorer: Cliff Schmautz (Portland)

Lester Patrick Cup
- Champions: Seattle Totems
- Runners-up: Vancouver Canucks

Seasons
- 1965–66 1967–68

The 1966–67 WHL season was the 15th season of the Western Hockey League. Seven teams played a 72-game schedule, and the Seattle Totems were the Lester Patrick Cup champions, defeating the as Vancouver Canucks four games to three in the final series.

Prior to the start of the season the San Francisco Seals were purchased by a group that was awarded a National Hockey League expansion team for the 1967–68 season, with plans to move the team to the NHL. The team was renamed the "California Seals" for their last season in the WHL. A new team was also added, the San Diego Gulls.

Guyle Fielder of Seattle led the league in scoring and was named the most valuable player.

== Teams ==
1966–67 Western Hockey League
Team	City	Arena	Capacity
California Seals	Oakland, California	Oakland Arena	15,000
Los Angeles Blades	Los Angeles, California	Los Angeles Sports Arena	14,546
Portland Buckaroos	Portland, Oregon	Memorial Coliseum	12,000
San Diego Gulls	San Diego, California	San Diego International Sports Center	12,920
Seattle Totems	Seattle, Washington	Seattle Center Coliseum	12,250
Vancouver Canucks	Vancouver, British Columbia	PNE Forum	5,050
Victoria Maple Leafs	Victoria, British Columbia	Victoria Memorial Arena	5,000

=== Map of teams ===
WHL Teams

== Final standings ==
WHL Standings
R	Team	GP	W	L	T	GF	GA	Pts
**1**	**Portland Buckaroos**	**72**	**41**	**24**	**7**	**255**	**209**	**89**
**2**	**Seattle Totems**	**72**	**39**	**26**	**7**	**228**	**195**	**85**
**3**	**Vancouver Canucks**	**72**	**38**	**32**	**2**	**228**	**215**	**78**
**4**	**California Seals**	**72**	**32**	**30**	**10**	**228**	**242**	**74**
5	Victoria Maple Leafs	72	30	34	8	224	232	68
6	Los Angeles Blades	72	29	38	5	260	286	63
7	San Diego Gulls	72	22	47	3	222	266	47

bold - qualified for playoffs

== Playoffs ==
Semifinals
1	Portland Buckaroos	0
3	Vancouver Canucks	4
2	Seattle Totems	4
4	California Seals	2

Finals
3	Vancouver Canucks	0
2	Seattle Totems	4

The Seattle Totems defeated the Vancouver Canucks 4 games to 0 to win the Lester Patrick Cup.

== Bibliography ==
- Stott, Jon C. (2008), Ice Warriors: The Pacific Coast/Western Hockey League 1948–1974, Surrey, British Columbia: Heritage House Publishing, ISBN 978-1-894974-54-7
