= 1967–68 WHL season =

- League: Western Hockey League
- Sport: Ice hockey
- Games: 72
- Teams: 5

Regular season
- Season champions: Portland Buckaroos
- Season MVP: Art Jones
- Top scorer: Len Ronson

Lester Patrick Cup
- Champions: Seattle Totems
- Runners-up: Portland Buckaroos

Seasons
- 1966–67 1968–69

The 1967–68 WHL season was the 16th season of the Western Hockey League. Five teams played a 72-game schedule, and the Seattle Totems were the Lester Patrick Cup champions, defeating the Portland Buckaroos four games to one in the final series. The Los Angeles Blades ceased operations, when the Los Angeles Kings joined the National Hockey League as an expansion team.

== Teams ==
1967–68 Western Hockey League
Team	City	Arena	Capacity
Phoenix Roadrunners	Phoenix, Arizona	Arizona Veterans Memorial Coliseum	12,371
Portland Buckaroos	Portland, Oregon	Memorial Coliseum	12,000
San Diego Gulls	San Diego, California	San Diego International Sports Center	12,920
Seattle Totems	Seattle, Washington	Seattle Center Coliseum	12,250
Vancouver Canucks	Vancouver, British Columbia	PNE Forum	5,050

=== Map of teams ===
WHL Teams

== Final standings ==
WHL Standings
R	Team	GP	W	L	T	GF	GA	Pts
**1**	**Portland Buckaroos**	**72**	**40**	**26**	**6**	**246**	**168**	**86**
**2**	**Seattle Totems**	**72**	**35**	**30**	**7**	**207**	**199**	**77**
**3**	**San Diego Gulls**	**72**	**31**	**36**	**5**	**241**	**236**	**67**
**4**	**Phoenix Roadrunners**	**72**	**28**	**40**	**4**	**215**	**276**	**60**
5	Vancouver Canucks	72	26	41	5	213	258	57

bold - qualified for playoffs

== Playoffs ==
Semifinals
1	Portland Buckaroos	4
3	San Diego Gulls	3
2	Seattle Totems	4
4	Phoenix Roadrunners	0

Finals
1	Portland Buckaroos	1
2	Seattle Totems	4

The Seattle Totems defeated the Portland Buckaroos 4 games to 1 to win the Lester Patrick Cup.
