= Portland Buckaroos =

American ice hockey team (1928–41, 1960–75)

- City: Portland, Oregon
- League: Western Hockey League
- Operated: 1960–1974
- Home arena: Memorial Coliseum
- Colors: Red, White, and Black

Franchise history
- 1928–1941 (PCHL/NWHL): Portland Buckaroos
- 1960–1974 (WHL): Portland Buckaroos
- 1975 (WIHL): Portland Buckaroos

The Portland Buckaroos was the name of several professional ice hockey teams based in Portland, Oregon.

== PCHL/NWHL era (1928–1941) ==
The first incarnation of Portland Buckaroos played their home games at the Portland Ice Arena. The Buckaroos initially played in the four-team Pacific Coast Hockey League (PCHL) from 1928 to 1931. The PCHL folded in 1931, and in 1933, the Buckaroos joined the new North West Hockey League. In 1936, the Buckaroos rejoined the reconstituted four-team PCHL, and won league championships in 1937 and 1939.

With the onset of World War II, the PCHL folded again in 1941. In 1944, it was again resurrected, but this time, Portland's team was the Portland Eagles (known as the Portland Penguins for one season).

== WHL/WIHL era (1960–1975) ==
In 1960, Portland was granted a franchise in the minor league Western Hockey League (WHL) for its newly built 10,500 seat Memorial Coliseum, and the Buckaroos name was reincarnated. The new Buckaroos were composed mostly of players and coaches from the New Westminster Royals, including its head coach Hal Laycoe. The Buckaroos went on to beat the Seattle Totems in the league championship and win the Lester Patrick Cup in its first season of existence. That 1960–61 Buckaroos team was inducted into the Oregon Sports Hall of Fame in 1990.

The Buckaroos won another league championship under Laycoe in 1964–65, and a third in 1970–71 under coach and former team captain Gord Fashoway. In the early '70s, the Buckaroos served as a minor league affiliate for a variety of National Hockey League teams, most notably the Los Angeles Kings.

In 1974, the WHL folded and the Buckaroos moved to the semi-pro Western International Hockey League for the 1974–75 season, and to the startup Northwest Hockey League the next year, but that league did not last a full season.

== Notable Buckaroos ==
An incomplete list of noted Buckaroos players:

=== PCHL/NWHL era ===
- Andy Aitkenhead (goalie; 1987 Oregon Sports Hall of Fame inductee)

=== WHL era ===
- Marv Edwards (WHL Outstanding Goaltender Award)
- Gord Fashoway (1960–61 team captain; 1960–61 Fred Hume Cup for sportsmanship; coach from 1969–1973)
- Don Head (1960–61 WHL Rookie of the Year; three-time Outstanding Goaltender Award; 1993 Oregon Sports Hall of Fame inductee)
- Andy Hebenton (five-time Fred Hume Cup for sportsmanship)
- Art Jones (two-time George Leader Cup for most valuable player; six-time Leading Scorer Award; 1984 Oregon Sports Hall of Fame inductee)
- Dave Kelly (1963–64 WHL Rookie of the Year; two-time WHL Outstanding Goaltender Award)
- Connie Madigan (Hal Laycoe Cup for outstanding WHL defenseman)
- Jimmy McLeod (four-time WHL Outstanding Goaltender Award)
- Doug Messier (father of NHL Hall of Famer Mark Messier)
- Cliff Schmautz (1965–66 Leading Scorer Award)
- Pat Stapleton (Hal Laycoe Cup for outstanding WHL defenseman)
