= 1968–69 WHL season =

- League: Western Hockey League
- Sport: Ice hockey
- Number of games: 74
- Number of teams: 6

Regular season
- Season champions: Portland Buckaroos
- Top scorer: Art Jones

Lester Patrick Cup
- Champions: Vancouver Canucks
- Runners-up: Portland Buckaroos

Seasons
- ← 1967–68 1969–70 →

The 1968–69 WHL season was the 17th season of the Western Hockey League. Six teams played a 74-game schedule, and the Vancouver Canucks were the Lester Patrick Cup champions, defeating the Portland Buckaroos four games to none in the final series. The Denver Spurs joined the WHL as sixth team.

== Teams ==
1968–69 Western Hockey League
Team	City	Arena	Capacity
Denver Spurs	Denver, Colorado	Denver Coliseum	8,140
Phoenix Roadrunners	Phoenix, Arizona	Arizona Veterans Memorial Coliseum	12,371
Portland Buckaroos	Portland, Oregon	Memorial Coliseum	12,000
San Diego Gulls	San Diego, California	San Diego International Sports Center	12,920
Seattle Totems	Seattle, Washington	Seattle Center Coliseum	12,250
Vancouver Canucks	Vancouver, British Columbia	Pacific Coliseum	15,038

=== Map of teams ===
WHL Teams

== Final standings ==
WHL Standings
R	Team	GP	W	L	T	GF	GA	Pts
**1**	**Portland Buckaroos**	**74**	**40**	**18**	**16**	**291**	**201**	**96**
**2**	**Vancouver Canucks**	**74**	**36**	**24**	**14**	**259**	**223**	**86**
**3**	**San Diego Gulls**	**74**	**33**	**29**	**12**	**273**	**260**	**78**
**4**	**Seattle Totems**	**74**	**33**	**30**	**11**	**236**	**238**	**77**
5	Phoenix Roadrunners	74	21	41	12	199	282	54
6	Denver Spurs	74	23	44	7	254	308	53

bold - qualified for playoffs

== Playoffs ==
Semifinals
1	Portland Buckaroos	4
3	San Diego Gulls	3
2	Vancouver Canucks	4
4	Seattle Totems	0

Finals
1	Portland Buckaroos	0
2	Vancouver Canucks	4

The Vancouver Canucks defeated the Portland Buckaroos 4 games to 0 to win the Lester Patrick Cup.
