= 1965–66 WHL season =

- League: Western Hockey League
- Sport: Ice hockey
- Games: 72
- Teams: 6

Regular season
- Season champions: Portland Buckaroos
- Season MVP: Billy McNeill (Vancouver)
- Top scorer: Cliff Schmautz (Portland)

Lester Patrick Cup
- Champions: Victoria Maple Leafs
- Runners-up: Portland Buckaroos

Seasons
- 1964–65 1966–67

The 1965–66 WHL season was the 14th season of the Western Hockey League. Six teams played a 72-game schedule, and the Victoria Maple Leafs were the Lester Patrick Cup champions, defeating the as Portland Buckaroos four games to three in the final series.

Billy McNeill of Vancouver was named the most valuable player, while Cliff Schmautz of Portland led the league in scoring.

== Teams ==
1965–66 Western Hockey League
Team	City	Arena	Capacity
Los Angeles Blades	Los Angeles, California	Los Angeles Sports Arena	14,546
Portland Buckaroos	Portland, Oregon	Memorial Coliseum	12,000
San Francisco Seals	San Francisco, California	Cow Palace	11,089
Seattle Totems	Seattle, Washington	Seattle Center Coliseum	12,250
Vancouver Canucks	Vancouver, British Columbia	PNE Forum	5,050
Victoria Maple Leafs	Victoria, British Columbia	Victoria Memorial Arena	5,000

=== Map of teams ===
WHL Teams

== Final standings ==
WHL Standings
R	Team	GP	W	L	T	GF	GA	Pts
**1**	**Portland Buckaroos**	**72**	**43**	**24**	**5**	**271**	**218**	**91**
**2**	**Victoria Maple Leafs**	**72**	**40**	**28**	**4**	**260**	**243**	**84**
**3**	**Vancouver Canucks**	**72**	**33**	**35**	**4**	**252**	**233**	**70**
**4**	**San Francisco Seals**	**72**	**32**	**36**	**4**	**243**	**248**	**68**
5	Seattle Totems	72	32	37	3	231	256	67
6	Los Angeles Blades	72	22	48	2	236	329	46

bold - qualified for playoffs

== Playoffs ==
Semifinals
1	Portland Buckaroos	4
3	Vancouver Canucks	3
2	Victoria Maple Leafs	4
4	San Francisco Seals	3

Finals
1	Portland Buckaroos	3
2	Victoria Maple Leafs	4

The Victoria Maple Leafs defeated the Portland Buckaroos 4 games to 3 to win the Lester Patrick Cup.

== Bibliography ==
- Stott, Jon C. (2008), Ice Warriors: The Pacific Coast/Western Hockey League 1948–1974, Surrey, British Columbia: Heritage House Publishing, ISBN 978-1-894974-54-7
