= 1963–64 WHL season =

- League: Western Hockey League
- Sport: Ice hockey
- Games: 70
- Teams: 6

Regular season
- Season champions: Denver Invaders

President's Cup
- Champions: San Francisco Seals
- Runners-up: Los Angeles Blades

Seasons
- 1962–63 1964–65

The 1963–64 WHL season was the 12th season of the Western Hockey League. The San Francisco Seals were the President's Cup champions as they beat the Los Angeles Blades in six games in the final series.

== Teams ==
1963–64 Western Hockey League
Team	City	Arena	Capacity
Denver Invaders	Denver, Colorado	Denver Coliseum	8,140
Los Angeles Blades	Los Angeles, California	Los Angeles Sports Arena	14,546
Portland Buckaroos	Portland, Oregon	Memorial Coliseum	12,000
San Francisco Seals	San Francisco, California	Cow Palace	11,089
Seattle Totems	Seattle, Washington	Civic Ice Arena	5,000
Vancouver Canucks	Vancouver, British Columbia	PNE Forum	5,050

=== Map of teams ===
WHL Teams

== Final standings ==
WHL Standings
R	Team	GP	W	L	T	GF	GA	Pts
**1**	**Denver Invaders**	**70**	**44**	**23**	**3**	**271**	**202**	**91**
**2**	**Portland Buckaroos**	**70**	**33**	**30**	**7**	**229**	**228**	**73**
**3**	**Los Angeles Blades**	**70**	**31**	**31**	**8**	**218**	**244**	**70**
**4**	**San Francisco Seals**	**70**	**32**	**35**	**3**	**228**	**262**	**67**
5	Seattle Totems	70	29	35	6	247	228	64
6	Vancouver Canucks	70	26	41	3	229	258	55

bold - qualified for playoffs

== Playoffs ==
Round 1
1	Denver Invaders	2
3	**Los Angeles Blades**	**4**
2	Portland Buckaroos	1
4	**San Francisco Seals**	**4**

Finals
3	Los Angeles Blades	2
4	**San Francisco Seals**	**4**

The San Francisco Seals win the President's Cup 4 games to 2.
