= 1964–65 WHL season =

- League: Western Hockey League
- Sport: Ice hockey
- Games: 70
- Teams: 6

Regular season
- Season champions: Portland Buckaroos

President's Cup
- Champions: Portland Buckaroos
- Runners-up: Victoria Maple Leafs

Seasons
- 1963–64 1965–66

The 1964–65 WHL season was the 13th season of the Western Hockey League. The Portland Buckaroos were the President's Cup champions as they beat the Victoria Maple Leafs in five games in the final series.

== Teams ==
1964–65 Western Hockey League
Team	City	Arena	Capacity
Los Angeles Blades	Los Angeles, California	Los Angeles Sports Arena	14,546
Portland Buckaroos	Portland, Oregon	Memorial Coliseum	12,000
San Francisco Seals	San Francisco, California	Cow Palace	11,089
Seattle Totems	Seattle, Washington	Seattle Center Coliseum	12,250
Vancouver Canucks	Vancouver, British Columbia	PNE Forum	5,050
Victoria Maple Leafs	Victoria, British Columbia	Victoria Memorial Arena	5,000

=== Map of teams ===
WHL Teams

== Final standings ==
WHL Standings
R	Team	GP	W	L	T	GF	GA	Pts
**1**	**Portland Buckaroos**	**70**	**42**	**23**	**5**	**267**	**216**	**89**
**2**	**Seattle Totems**	**70**	**36**	**30**	**4**	**204**	**198**	**76**
**3**	**Vancouver Canucks**	**70**	**32**	**32**	**6**	**263**	**244**	**70**
**4**	**Victoria Maple Leafs**	**70**	**32**	**36**	**2**	**246**	**242**	**66**
5	San Francisco Seals	70	31	37	2	255	283	64
6	Los Angeles Blades	70	26	41	3	217	269	55

bold - qualified for playoffs

== Playoffs ==
Round 1
1	**Portland Buckaroos**	**4**
3	Vancouver Canucks	1
2	Seattle Totems	3
4	**Victoria Maple Leafs**	**4**

Finals
1	**Portland Buckaroos**	**4**
4	Victoria Maple Leafs	1

The Portland Buckaroos win the President's Cup 4 games to 1.
