= Doug Anderson (ice hockey) =

Canadian ice hockey player (1927–1998)

- Born: October 20, 1927 Edmonton, Alberta, Canada
- Died: January 8, 1998 (aged 70) Victoria, British Columbia, Canada
- Height: 5 ft 7 in (170 cm)
- Weight: 157 lb (71 kg; 11 st 3 lb)
- Position: Centre
- Shot: Left
- Played for: Montreal Canadiens
- Playing career: 1947–1963

Douglas MacLean "Andy" Anderson (October 20, 1927 – January 8, 1998) was a Canadian professional ice hockey centre who played two playoff games for the Montreal Canadiens of the National Hockey League (NHL) during the 1952–53 season. The rest of his career, which lasted from 1947 to 1963, was mainly spent in the minor professional Western Hockey League. Anderson also played with the 1947–48 Edmonton Flyers team that won the 1948 Allan Cup the senior Canadian championship.

== Playing career ==
Anderson played with the 1947–48 Edmonton Flyers that won the 1948 Allan Cup. In the tournament leading up to the final, played in Calgary, the Flyers played in Manitoba, Saskatchewan, Alberta and British Columbia. Out of 24 games played, the Flyer's record was 19 wins, four losses and one draw. This was a vital moment in Western Canada hockey history that helped create the foundation for Alberta's rich hockey tradition. The Flyer's thrilling victory over the Ottawa Senators energized the entire city and their victory parade attracted more than 60,000 people, half the population of Edmonton in 1948. The national title was only the third national hockey title ever won by an Alberta team.

Anderson played two playoff games for the Montreal Canadiens of the National Hockey League during the 1953 playoffs. He scored no points and had no penalty minutes during those two games. He qualified to be engraved on the Stanley Cup, but his name was left off, since he did not play regularly with Montreal. He spent most of his career playing for the Vancouver Canucks of the minor professional Western Hockey League. He retired from hockey after the 1962–63 season.

He was inducted with the rest of the 1947–48 Edmonton Flyers team to the Alberta Sports Hall of Fame and Museum in 2005.

== Personal life ==
Anderson married Barbara Gayle Webster in 1953 and had three children. He died on January 8, 1998. Due to his commitment to athletes getting a good education, a memorial bursary was set up in his name and memory at the University of Victoria. His death date was confirmed with a newspaper obituary in Victoria.

== Career statistics ==
=== Regular season and playoffs ===
			Regular season					Playoffs
Season	Team	League	GP	G	A	Pts	PIM	GP	G	A	Pts	PIM
1945–46	Edmonton Canadians	EJrHL	—	—	—	—	—	—	—	—	—	—
1945–46	Edmonton Canadians	M-Cup	—	—	—	—	—	10	3	4	7	0
1946–47	Edmonton Canadians	EJrHL	6	4	4	8	2	—	—	—	—	—
1947–48	Edmonton Flyers	WCSHL	40	15	35	50	10	10	5	10	15	4
1947–48	Edmonton Flyers	Al-Cup	—	—	—	—	—	14	6	19	25	2
1948–49	Edmonton Flyers	WCSHL	40	16	31	47	20	9	2	2	4	6
1949–50	Edmonton Flyers	WCSHL	45	18	44	62	28	6	1	5	6	7
1950–51	Edmonton Flyers	WCSHL	51	16	30	46	20	7	1	5	6	0
1951–52	Vancouver Canucks	PCHL	67	14	33	47	10	13	4	4	8	10
1952–53	Vancouver Canucks	WHL	70	18	50	68	14	—	—	—	—	—
1952–53	Montreal Canadiens	NHL	—	—	—	—	—	2	0	0	0	0
1953–54	Vancouver Canucks	WHL	60	7	15	22	10	—	—	—	—	—
1953–54	Buffalo Bisons	AHL	7	0	2	2	4	—	—	—	—	—
1954–55	Vancouver Canucks	WHL	51	15	28	43	4	3	0	0	0	0
1955–56	Victoria Cougars	WHL	62	23	40	63	24	9	3	2	5	4
1956–57	Vancouver Canucks	WHL	70	22	42	64	22	3	1	0	1	0
1957–58	Vancouver Canucks	WHL	26	4	9	13	2	—	—	—	—	—
1958–59	Vancouver Canucks	WHL	67	16	32	48	12	3	0	2	2	0
1959–60	Vancouver Canucks	WHL	70	10	22	32	2	11	2	2	4	0
1960–61	Vancouver Canucks	WHL	70	6	30	36	12	5	1	4	5	0
1961–62	Portland Buckaroos	WHL	54	4	22	26	2	7	1	2	3	7
1962–63	Portland Buckaroos	WHL	60	5	6	11	0	—	—	—	—	—
PCHL/WHL totals			727	144	329	473	114	54	12	16	28	21
NHL totals			—	—	—	—	—	2	0	0	0	0
