= Sid Finney =

Canadian ice hockey player

- Born: May 1, 1929 Banbridge, Northern Ireland
- Died: February 3, 2009 (aged 79) Calgary, Alberta, Canada
- Height: 5 ft 10 in (178 cm)
- Weight: 160 lb (73 kg; 11 st 6 lb)
- Position: Centre
- Shot: Left
- Played for: Chicago Black Hawks
- Playing career: 1949–1969

Joseph Sidney Finney (May 1, 1929 – February 3, 2009) was a Canadian professional ice hockey player. He was a centre for 59 games in the National Hockey League (NHL) with the Chicago Black Hawks between 1951 and 1953. The rest of his career, which lasted from 1949 to 1969, was spent in the minor leagues. Finnery would be the 13th all-time scorer in the Western Hockey League. He led the Calgary Stampeders to a championship in 1954 and led the WHL in scoring with 45 goals in 1958. Finney was born in Banbridge, Northern Ireland, but grew up in Calgary, Alberta.

== Career statistics ==
=== Regular season and playoffs ===
			Regular season					Playoffs
Season	Team	League	GP	G	A	Pts	PIM	GP	G	A	Pts	PIM
1947–48	Calgary Buffaloes	SAJHL	15	6	8	14	9	8	2	2	4	0
1948–49	Calgary Buffaloes	WCJHL	32	27	16	43	14	8	9	3	12	2
1948–49	Calgary Buffaloes	M-Cup	—	—	—	—	—	16	12	7	19	4
1949–50	Calgary Stampeders	WCSHL	17	7	5	12	4	—	—	—	—	—
1950–51	Calgary Stampeders	WCSHL	57	44	37	81	12	8	4	1	5	0
1951–52	Chicago Black Hawks	NHL	35	6	5	11	0	—	—	—	—	—
1951–52	St. Louis Flyers	AHL	23	8	5	13	2	—	—	—	—	—
1952–53	Chicago Black Hawks	NHL	18	4	2	6	4	7	0	2	2	0
1952–53	Calgary Stampeders	WHL	39	25	19	44	12	—	—	—	—	—
1953–54	Chicago Black Hawks	NHL	6	0	0	0	0	—	—	—	—	—
1953–54	Calgary Stampeders	WHL	47	29	33	62	9	18	15	5	20	4
1954–55	Calgary Stampeders	WHL	70	35	42	77	20	9	4	5	9	0
1955–56	Calgary Stampeders	WHL	69	43	36	79	24	8	7	4	11	0
1956–57	Calgary Stampeders	WHL	68	41	38	79	47	3	0	0	0	8
1957–58	Calgary Stampeders	WHL	58	45	43	88	8	12	5	9	14	12
1958–59	Calgary Stampeders	WHL	60	29	30	59	24	8	1	5	6	2
1959–60	Calgary Stampeders	WHL	59	28	32	60	6	—	—	—	—	—
1960–61	Calgary Stampeders	WHL	59	26	42	68	12	5	2	4	6	0
1961–62	Calgary Stampeders	WHL	61	35	32	67	4	7	2	2	4	0
1962–63	Edmonton Flyers	WHL	65	23	42	65	16	3	1	3	4	0
1963–64	Cincinnati Wings	CPHL	13	3	3	6	4	—	—	—	—	—
1963–64	Portland Buckaroos	WHL	39	9	10	19	2	—	—	—	—	—
1965–66	Drumheller Miners	ASHL	24	13	21	34	4	12	6	9	15	0
1965–66	Drumheller Miners	Al-Cup	—	—	—	—	—	16	13	15	28	4
1968–69	Calgary Stampeders	ASHL	—	7	12	19	12	4	2	1	3	0
WHL totals			694	368	399	767	184	73	37	37	74	26
NHL totals			59	10	7	17	4	7	0	2	2	0

== Accomplishments and awards ==
- WHL Prairie Division First All-Star Team (1957, 1958)
- Leader Cup (MVP - WHL Prairie Division) (1958)

== See also ==
- List of National Hockey League players from the United Kingdom
