= Hugh Coflin =

Canadian ice hockey player (1928–2021)

- Born: December 15, 1928 Blaine Lake, Saskatchewan, Canada
- Died: April 30, 2021 (aged 92) Tsawwassen, British Columbia, Canada
- Height: 6 ft 0 in (183 cm)
- Weight: 190 lb (86 kg; 13 st 8 lb)
- Position: Defence
- Shot: Left
- Played for: Chicago Black Hawks
- Playing career: 1948–1960

Hugh Jay Alexander Coflin (December 15, 1928 – April 30, 2021) was a Canadian ice hockey player who played 31 games in the National Hockey League with the Chicago Black Hawks during the 1950–51 season. In the summer of 1951, Hugh had the distinction of being part of the largest player and cash transaction in NHL history to that date. Detroit sent six players to Chicago for $75,000.00 and a player to be named later-Coflin. The Wings labelled him "a promising NHL prospect" and sent him to their top farm club in Indianapolis for the experience. Hugh was called up to the Red Wings and landed his name on the Stanley Cup. In Detroit's 1952 training camp, Hugh had his Achilles tendon severed and was sent to Detroit's farm club, Edmonton Flyers. (Western Hockey League) Hugh played 8 seasons with the Flyers, was the team Captain, and 2-time WHL 1st team All-Star. Coflin was born in Blaine Lake, Saskatchewan Hugh Coflin retired in 1960.

== Career statistics ==
=== Regular season and playoffs ===
			Regular season					Playoffs
Season	Team	League	GP	G	A	Pts	PIM	GP	G	A	Pts	PIM
1946–47	Humboldt Indians	SJHL	22	7	4	11	4	—	—	—	—	—
1947–48	Moose Jaw Canucks	SJHL	26	8	11	19	34	5	1	2	3	8
1947–48	Moose Jaw Canucks	M-Cup	—	—	—	—	—	5	2	0	2	4
1948–49	Moose Jaw Canucks	WCJHL	26	10	7	17	62	9	0	1	1	19
1948–49	Moose Jaw Canucks	M-Cup	—	—	—	—	—	7	2	1	3	11
1949–50	Calgary Stampeders	WCSHL	50	6	11	17	133	10	0	4	4	35
1949–50	Calgary Stampeders	Al-Cup	—	—	—	—	—	14	4	10	14	42
1950–51	Chicago Black Hawks	NHL	31	0	3	3	33	—	—	—	—	—
1950–51	Milwaukee Sea Gulls	USHL	35	1	16	17	26	—	—	—	—	—
1951–52	Indianapolis Capitals/Detroit Red Wings	AHL/NHL	68	3	25	28	64	—	—	—	—	—	1952–53	Edmonton Flyers	WHL	23	1	4	5	55	—	—	—	—	—
1953–54	Edmonton Flyers	WHL	70	8	18	26	115	13	1	3	4	12
1954–55	Edmonton Flyers	WHL	44	5	25	30	78	9	0	2	2	18
1955–56	Edmonton Flyers	WHL	67	9	14	23	109	3	0	0	0	2
1956–57	Edmonton Flyers	WHL	57	6	20	26	77	8	1	0	1	8
1957–58	Edmonton Flyers	WHL	70	12	32	44	61	5	1	1	2	10
1958–59	Edmonton Flyers	WHL	61	9	25	34	61	3	0	1	1	0
1959–60	Edmonton Flyers	WHL	65	7	20	27	18	4	0	0	0	0
WHL totals			457	57	158	215	574	45	3	7	10	50
NHL totals			31	0	3	3	33	—	—	—	—	—
