= Billy McNeill (ice hockey) =

Canadian ice hockey player

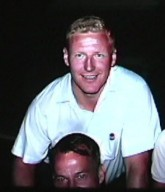
- Billy McNeill, North Vancouver, BC, standing over Gordie Howe c. 1965
- Born: January 26, 1936; Edmonton, Alberta, Canada
- Died: August 31, 2007 (aged 71); Surrey, British Columbia, Canada
- Height: 5 ft 10 in (178 cm)
- Weight: 185 lb (84 kg; 13 st 3 lb)
- Position: Right wing
- Shot: Right
- Played for: Detroit Red Wings
- Playing career: 1953–1971

William Ronald McNeill (January 26, 1936 – August 31, 2007) was a Canadian professional ice hockey player. He played in the National Hockey League with the Detroit Red Wings between 1956 and 1963. The rest of his career, which lasted from 1953 to 1971, was mainly spent in the minor Western Hockey League.

== Early life ==
McNeill broke in with the local junior team, the Edmonton Oil Kings in 1951. He also played 49 games in 1954-55 with the Hamilton Tiger Cubs of the Ontario Hockey Association junior league.

== Professional career ==
=== Edmonton and Detroit ===
In 1955 McNeill turned pro with the local Edmonton Flyers of the WHL, who played their games in the old Edmonton Gardens. In 1956 McNeill was called up to the Detroit Red Wings in the NHL following serious injuries to Alex Delvecchio and Bill Dineen. During the next eight seasons, he was called up from the Flyers six times, playing 257 games in the NHL.

On February 5, 1960, McNeill was to be traded to the New York Rangers with Red Kelly for Bill Gadsby and Eddie Shack, but Kelly and McNeill refused to report and the transaction was cancelled. As a result, Kelly temporarily retired and McNeill was suspended for the rest of the season. New York then picked him up in the intra-league draft in June of that year, only to trade him back to Detroit in January 1961, who in turn assigned him back to the Flyers in Edmonton.

In the six seasons he played for Detroit, he wore sweater numbers 19 and 15.

=== Later WHL career ===
In January 1964, McNeill was traded by Detroit to the Vancouver Canucks (of the WHL) for Barrie Ross and future considerations. In Vancouver he began six seasons with the Canucks wearing sweater number 16. He became an enduring star player and perennial fan favourite in the PNE Forum arena, winning the Leader Cup as MVP of the WHL two years' running, in 1965 and 1966. He was also selected to the WHL's First All-Star team both those years. He was known for his short stick with a rounded bottom to the blade.

His best season as a pro was 1965-'66 in Vancouver when he finished with 40 goals and 62 assists, both career highs. He tied Portland's Art Jones for second place in league scoring. He also had 6 goals and 13 points in the playoffs that year.

On August 19, 1969, he was traded by Vancouver to the Salt Lake Golden Eagles for Germain Gagnon and cash. He missed most of the 1969-70 season with an ankle injury suffered against Phoenix in November 1969. McNeill retired after the 1971 season while with the San Diego Gulls, scoring 29 points in 64 games and appearing in six playoff games.

== Assist on record-breaking goal ==
McNeill assisted on Gordie Howe's (then) record-breaking 545th goal in November 1963.

It was McNeill's first assist of the season. He told reporter Pat Curran that it was a "perfect goal." "Bill Gadsby was yelling at me on one side and Gordie was shouting on the other and telling me to take the lead out. He knew we had a three-on-two break. When I dumped the puck over he shot past (Canadiens' goalie Charlie) Hodge on the short side." Montreal Canadiens' legends Jean Béliveau and Jacques Laperrière were defending on the play.

== Career statistics ==
=== Regular season and playoffs ===
			Regular season					Playoffs
Season	Team	League	GP	G	A	Pts	PIM	GP	G	A	Pts	PIM
1951–52	Edmonton Oil Kings	WCJHL	42	23	24	47	41	9	4	10	14	2
1952–53	Edmonton Oil Kings	WJHL	36	15	15	30	59	10	5	3	8	12
1952–53	Edmonton Flyers	WHL	1	0	0	0	0	—	—	—	—	—
1953–54	Edmonton Oil Kings	WJHL	35	21	39	60	47	10	10	18	28	23
1953–54	Edmonton Oil Kings	M-Cup	—	—	—	—	—	14	4	13	17	27
1954–55	Hamilton Tiger Cubs	OHA	49	22	28	50	66	3	3	2	5	2
1954–55	Edmonton Flyers	WHL	3	1	1	2	0	—	—	—	—	—
1955–56	Edmonton Flyers	WHL	68	19	31	50	69	1	0	0	0	0
1956–57	Detroit Red Wings	NHL	64	5	10	15	24	—	—	—	—	—
1956–57	Edmonton Flyers	WHL	4	1	0	1	26	—	—	—	—	—
1957–58	Detroit Red Wings	NHL	35	5	10	15	24	4	1	1	2	4
1957–58	Edmonton Flyers	WHL	31	17	14	31	42	—	—	—	—	—
1958–59	Detroit Red Wings	NHL	54	2	5	7	32	—	—	—	—	—
1958–59	Edmonton Flyers	WHL	12	12	12	24	15	3	1	1	2	0
1959–60	Detroit Red Wings	NHL	47	5	13	18	31	—	—	—	—	—
1960–61	Edmonton Flyers	WHL	23	8	17	25	16	—	—	—	—	—
1961–62	Edmonton Flyers	WHL	26	13	28	41	68	12	7	4	11	19
1962–63	Detroit Red Wings	NHL	42	3	7	10	12	—	—	—	—	—
1962–63	Edmonton Flyers	WHL	22	5	19	24	8	3	0	3	3	0
1963–64	Detroit Red Wings	NHL	15	1	1	2	2	—	—	—	—	—
1963–64	Pittsburgh Hornets	AHL	20	1	6	7	23	—	—	—	—	—
1963–64	Vancouver Canucks	WHL	24	4	20	24	4	—	—	—	—	—
1964–65	Vancouver Canucks	WHL	58	29	59	88	86	5	2	4	6	0
1965–66	Vancouver Canucks	WHL	72	40	62	102	20	7	6	7	13	0
1966–67	Vancouver Canucks	WHL	6	3	5	8	4	—	—	—	—	—
1967–68	Vancouver Canucks	WHL	41	11	24	35	41	—	—	—	—	—
1968–69	Vancouver Canucks	WHL	22	3	2	5	10	—	—	—	—	—
1968–69	Rochester Americans	AHL	19	3	15	18	18	—	—	—	—	—
1969–70	Salt Lake Golden Eagles	WHL	24	6	16	22	4	—	—	—	—	—
1970–71	Salt Lake Golden Eagles	WHL	5	0	0	0	2	—	—	—	—	—
1970–71	San Diego Gulls	WHL	65	14	15	29	39	6	0	1	1	0
WHL totals			507	186	325	511	454	37	16	20	36	19
NHL totals			257	21	46	67	130	4	1	1	2	4
