= Dennis Riggin =

Canadian ice hockey player (1936–2016)

- Born: April 11, 1936 Kincardine, Ontario, Canada
- Died: April 2, 2016 (aged 79) Kincardine, Ontario, Canada
- Height: 5 ft 11 in (180 cm)
- Weight: 156 lb (71 kg; 11 st 2 lb)
- Position: Goaltender
- Caught: Left
- Played for: Detroit Red Wings
- Playing career: 1952–1976

Dennis Melville Riggin (April 11, 1936 – April 2, 2016) was a Canadian professional ice hockey player who played 18 games in the National Hockey League in two short stints with the Detroit Red Wings during the 1959–60 and 1962–63 seasons. The rest of his career, which lasted from 1954 to 1963, was spent in the minor leagues.

Post-hockey Riggin worked at Molson's for 30 years in London, Ontario and Toronto before retiring to Kincardine. His son Pat also played in the NHL as a goaltender.

== Career statistics ==
=== Regular season and playoffs ===
			Regular season									Playoffs
Season	Team	League	GP	W	L	T	MIN	GA	SO	GAA	SV%	GP	W	L	MIN	GA	SO	GAA	SV%
1951–52	Windsor Spitfires	OHA	25	—	—	—	1480	163	0	6.61	—	—	—	—	—	—	—	—	—
1952–53	Windsor Spitfires	OHA	55	—	—	—	3300	177	4	3.21	—	—	—	—	—	—	—	—	—
1953–54	Hamilton Tiger Cubs	OHA	53	30	20	3	3180	176	3	3.32	—	7	—	—	420	23	0	3.39	—
1953–54	Hamilton Tigers	OHA Sr	1	1	0	0	60	1	0	1.00	—	—	—	—	—	—	—	—	—
1954–55	Hamilton Tiger Cubs	OHA	49	21	23	5	2940	173	0	3.45	—	12	—	—	720	42	2	3.50	—
1955–56	Hamilton Tiger Cubs	OHA	47	13	29	5	2820	244	0	5.19	—	—	—	—	—	—	—	—	—
1955–56	Edmonton Flyers	WHL	8	3	5	0	480	29	0	3.63	—	3	0	3	188	13	0	4.15	—
1956–57	Edmonton Flyers	WHL	67	38	25	4	4085	200	1	2.94	—	8	3	5	480	21	0	2.62	—
1957–58	Edmonton Flyers	WHL	69	37	28	4	4190	222	5	3.18	—	5	2	3	300	13	1	2.60	—
1957–58	Calgary Stampeders	WHL	1	0	1	0	60	4	0	4.00	—	—	—	—	—	—	—	—	—
1958–59	Edmonton Flyers	WHL	13	7	5	1	800	27	3	2.03	—	—	—	—	—	—	—	—	—
1959–60	Detroit Red Wings	NHL	9	2	6	1	538	31	1	3.46	—	—	—	—	—	—	—	—	—
1959–60	Edmonton Flyers	WHL	59	30	25	4	3580	200	3	3.35	—	4	0	4	274	13	0	2.85	—
1960–61	Edmonton Flyers	WHL	69	26	43	0	4140	289	0	4.19	—	—	—	—	—	—	—	—	—
1961–62	Edmonton Flyers	WHL	10	9	1	0	602	18	1	1.79	—	—	—	—	—	—	—	—	—
1962–63	Detroit Red Wings	NHL	9	5	3	1	459	22	0	2.88	—	—	—	—	—	—	—	—	—
1962–63	Pittsburgh Hornets	AHL	19	1	16	1	1140	112	0	5.89	—	—	—	—	—	—	—	—	—
1962–63	Edmonton Flyers	WHL	8	3	4	1	480	34	0	4.25	—	—	—	—	—	—	—	—	—
WHL totals			308	153	137	14	18,417	1023	13	3.33	—	20	5	15	1242	60	1	2.90	—
NHL totals			18	7	9	2	997	53	1	3.19	.886	—	—	—	—	—	—	—	—

== Honours ==
- 1956–57 WHL Rookie Award
