= Ray Barry (ice hockey) =

Canadian ice hockey player (1928–2018)

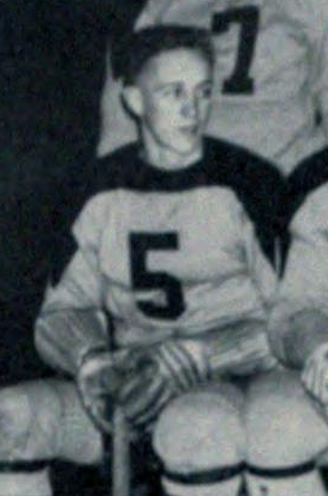
- Barry with the St. Michaels Majors
- Born: October 4, 1928 Revere, Massachusetts, U.S.
- Died: August 28, 2018 (aged 89) Calgary, Alberta, Canada
- Height: 5 ft 11 in (180 cm)
- Weight: 170 lb (77 kg; 12 st 2 lb)
- Position: Centre
- Shot: Left
- Played for: Boston Bruins
- Playing career: 1948–1957

William Raymond Barry (October 4, 1928 – August 28, 2018) was an American-born Canadian professional ice hockey player who played 18 games in the National Hockey League with the Boston Bruins during the 1951–52 season.

== Early life ==
Barry was born in Revere, Massachusetts, and raised in Edmonton, Alberta.

== Career ==
Barry spent most of his career, which lasted from 1948 to 1957 in the minor Western Hockey League, though split the 1951–52 season between the NHL and the minor American Hockey League. Barry scored his lone NHL goal in Boston's 4–1 loss to Toronto at Boston Garden on November 25, 1951.

== Personal life ==
He died on August 28, 2018, in Calgary.

== Career statistics ==
=== Regular season and playoffs ===
			Regular season					Playoffs
Season	Team	League	GP	G	A	Pts	PIM	GP	G	A	Pts	PIM
1945–46	Edmonton Maple Leafs	EJrHL	—	—	—	—	—	—	—	—	—	—
1946–47	Edmonton Capitals	EJrHL	7	5	2	7	2	3	2	1	3	0
1947–48	St. Michael's Majors	OHA	31	9	28	37	8	—	—	—	—	—
1948–49	Sherbrooke Saint-Francois	QSHL	63	18	61	79	18	12	2	10	12	6
1949–50	Sherbrooke Saints	QSHL	59	21	40	61	47	11	2	2	4	8
1949–50	Sherbrooke Saints	Al-Cup	—	—	—	—	—	10	3	7	10	18
1950–51	Edmonton Flyers	WCSHL	60	28	40	68	38	8	5	5	10	0
1951–52	Boston Bruins	NHL	18	1	2	3	6	—	—	—	—	—
1951–52	Hershey Bears	AHL	49	17	29	46	20	4	1	1	2	2
1952–53	Calgary Stampeders	WHL	53	15	25	40	16	5	2	2	4	0
1953–54	Calgary Stampeders	WHL	70	17	24	41	20	18	4	10	14	12
1954–55	Calgary Stampeders	WHL	68	25	28	53	17	9	1	4	5	0
1955–56	Calgary Stampeders	WHL	65	23	43	66	13	8	3	8	11	0
1956–57	Calgary Stampeders	WHL	61	11	37	48	26	3	1	2	3	0
1957–58	Red Deer Rustlers	ASHL	—	—	—	—	—	—	—	—	—	—
WHL totals			317	91	157	248	92	43	11	26	37	12
NHL totals			18	1	2	3	6	—	—	—	—	—
