= Hank Bassen =

- Born: December 6, 1932 Calgary, Alberta, Canada
- Died: May 29, 2009 (aged 76) Calgary, Alberta, Canada
- Height: 5 ft 10 in (178 cm)
- Weight: 180 lb (82 kg; 12 st 12 lb)
- Position: Goaltender
- Caught: Left
- Played for: Chicago Black Hawks; Pittsburgh Penguins; Detroit Red Wings
- Playing career: 1954–1968

Henry "Hank, Red" Bassen (December 6, 1932 – May 29, 2009) was a Canadian ice hockey goaltender. He played in the National Hockey League for the Chicago Black Hawks, Detroit Red Wings and Pittsburgh Penguins between 1954 and 1968. He was the father of Bob Bassen, who played 765 regular-season games in the NHL.

== Playing career ==
Bassen began his NHL career in 1954 with the Chicago Black Hawks where he spent two seasons as the backup to Al Rollins. Bassen went on to have starting roles in the Western Hockey League for the Calgary Stampeders, Seattle Americans and the Vancouver Canucks before moving to the Detroit Red Wings where over three seasons he would serve as the backup to Terry Sawchuk between 1960 and 1963.

During the 1963–64 season, Bassen played seven games with the Indianapolis Capitals/Cincinnati Wings in the CPHL and 26 games with the Pittsburgh Hornets in the AHL.

After spending most of the season with the Pittsburgh Hornets, Bassen returned to the Red Wings roster to serve as a backup once more, this time to Roger Crozier during the 1963–64 NHL season. He played one final year with the Pittsburgh Penguins, backing up Les Binkley before retiring in 1968.

After retiring Bassen managed the junior Calgary Wranglers from 1984 to 1986, and had two sons go on to play professional hockey.

Bassen died on May 29, 2009, of heart failure at age 76.

== Career statistics ==
=== Regular season and playoffs ===
			Regular season									Playoffs
Season	Team	League	GP	W	L	T	MIN	GA	SO	GAA	SV%	GP	W	L	MIN	GA	SO	GAA	SV%
1949–50	Calgary Buffaloes	WCJHL	30	11	18	1	1800	111	0	3.70	—	—	—	—	—	—	—	—	—
1950–51	Calgary Buffaloes	WCJHL	37	8	27	2	2280	176	2	4.63	—	—	—	—	—	—	—	—	—
1950–51	Medicine Hat Tigers	WCJHL	1	0	1	0	60	10	0	10.00	—	—	—	—	—	—	—	—	—
1951–52	Calgary Buffaloes	WCJHL	42	21	17	4	2580	132	1	3.07	—	3	0	3	180	13	0	4.33	—
1952–53	Calgary Buffaloes	WJHL	30	14	13	3	1860	145	0	4.68	—	3	0	3	180	11	0	3.67	—
1953–54	Chatham Maroons	OHA Sr	55	22	30	3	3300	205	2	3.73	—	6	2	4	360	25	1	4.17	—
1954–55	Chicago Blackhawks	NHL	21	4	9	8	1260	63	0	3.00	—	—	—	—	—	—	—	—	—
1954–55	Buffalo Bisons	AHL	37	13	19	5	2220	121	3	3.27	—	—	—	—	—	—	—	—	—
1955–56	Chicago Blackhawks	NHL	12	2	9	1	720	41	1	3.42	.885	—	—	—	—	—	—	—	—
1955–56	Buffalo Bisons	AHL	53	26	23	4	3300	201	0	3.65	—	5	2	3	299	20	0	4.01	—
1956–57	Calgary Stampeders	WHL	68	29	35	4	4125	223	5	3.24	—	3	1	2	180	12	0	4.00	—
1957–58	Seattle Americans	WHL	60	27	27	6	3600	184	3	3.07	—	9	5	4	557	21	0	2.26	—
1958–59	Springfield Indians	AHL	29	13	14	2	1740	102	2	3.52	—	—	—	—	—	—	—	—	—
1959–60	Vancouver Canucks	WHL	70	44	19	6	4220	172	5	2.45	—	11	9	2	696	22	0	1.90	—
1960–61	Detroit Red Wings	NHL	34	13	12	9	2120	98	0	2.77	.894	4	1	2	220	9	0	2.45	.917
1961–62	Detroit Red Wings	NHL	27	9	12	6	1620	75	3	2.78	.902	—	—	—	—	—	—	—	—
1961–62	Sudbury Wolves	EPHL	3	1	2	0	180	14	0	4.67	—	—	—	—	—	—	—	—	—
1961–62	Edmonton Flyers	WHL	9	4	4	1	557	30	0	3.23	—	—	—	—	—	—	—	—	—
1962–63	Detroit Red Wings	NHL	16	6	5	5	960	52	0	3.25	.897	—	—	—	—	—	—	—	—
1962–63	Pittsburgh Hornets	AHL	40	15	23	2	2400	134	2	3.35	—	—	—	—	—	—	—	—	—
1963–64	Detroit Red Wings	NHL	1	0	1	0	60	4	0	4.00	.882	—	—	—	—	—	—	—	—
1963–64	Cincinnati Wings	CPHL	7	0	6	1	420	39	0	5.57	—	—	—	—	—	—	—	—	—
1963–64	Pittsburgh Hornets	AHL	26	9	15	2	1560	82	1	3.15	—	1	0	1	60	4	0	4.00	—
1964–65	Pittsburgh Hornets	AHL	57	24	25	7	3433	182	2	3.18	—	4	1	3	240	15	0	3.75	—
1965–66	Detroit Red Wings	NHL	11	3	3	0	406	17	0	2.51	.904	1	0	1	54	2	0	2.22	.933
1966–67	Detroit Red Wings	NHL	8	2	4	0	384	22	0	3.44	.898	—	—	—	—	—	—	—	—
1966–67	Pittsburgh Hornets	AHL	10	6	3	1	570	18	3	1.89	—	9	8	1	541	15	1	1.66	—
1967–68	Pittsburgh Penguins	NHL	25	7	10	3	1299	62	1	2.86	.909	—	—	—	—	—	—	—	—
NHL totals			156	46	65	31	8759	434	5	2.97	—	5	1	3	274	11	0	2.41	.920

== Awards and achievements ==
- WCJHL Second All-Star Team (1950)
- WCJHL First All-Star Team (1952)
- OHA Sr First All-Star Team (1954)
- WHL First All-Star Team (1960)
- Outstanding Goaltender Award (fewest goals against - WHL) (1960)
- Leader Cup (MVP - WHL) (co-winner - Guyle Fielder) (1960)
