= Phil Maloney =

Canadian ice hockey player and coach (1927–2020)

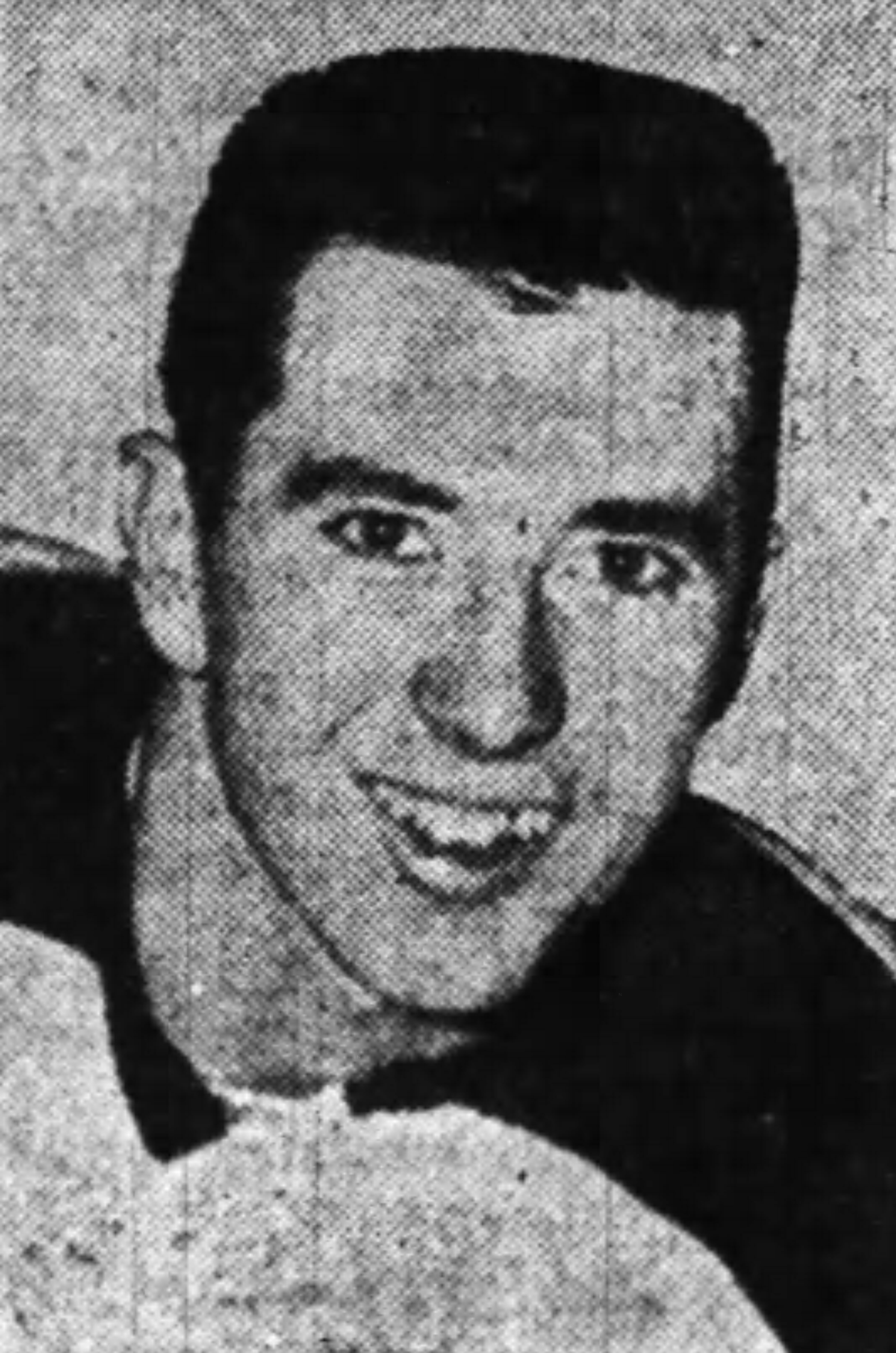
- Maloney pictured c. 1948
- Born: October 6, 1927 Ottawa, Ontario, Canada
- Died: February 21, 2020 (aged 92) British Columbia, Canada
- Height: 5 ft 9 in (175 cm)
- Weight: 170 lb (77 kg; 12 st 2 lb)
- Position: Centre
- Shot: Left
- Played for: Toronto Maple Leafs; Chicago Black Hawks; Boston Bruins
- Playing career: 1946–1970

Philip Francis Anthony Maloney (October 6, 1927 – February 21, 2020) was a Canadian professional ice hockey player and coach. He played in the National Hockey League (NHL) with the Boston Bruins, Toronto Maple Leafs, and Chicago Black Hawks between 1949 and 1960. The rest of his career, which lasted from 1946 to 1970, was spent in various minor leagues, mainly with the Vancouver Canucks of the Western Hockey League (WHL). After retiring he turned to coaching and coached the Vancouver Canucks of the NHL from 1974 to 1977. He also served as the general manager of the Canucks from 1974 to 1976.

== Playing career ==
Maloney began his career with the Shawinigan Cataractes before signing a free-agent contract with the Boston Bruins in 1948. Sent to the American Hockey League's Hershey Bears, he finished with 79 points in his first professional campaign. The next year, he earned a spot on the Bruins' National Hockey League roster and tallied 46 points (15 goals, 31 assists) in 70 games. As a result, he finished second in the 1949-50 Calder Memorial Trophy vote for Rookie of the Year. He played thirteen games with the Bruins the next season before being traded to the Toronto Maple Leafs. Maloney played 29 games with the Leafs in 1952–53. He later made NHL appearances with the Chicago Black Hawks, playing 45 games between 1958 and 1960.

Maloney spent 14 years with the Vancouver Canucks in the Western Hockey League. He retired at the end of the 1969–70 season, the year before the Canucks became a part of the NHL, and was the career scoring leader for the franchise with 923 points. He scored a career-high 102 points in 1960-61 during a two-year stint with the Buffalo Bisons. Maloney later was hired as an assistant coach by the NHL's Vancouver Canucks. He became the head coach late in the 1973–74 season and coached 37 games with the franchise. In 1974–75, he coached the team to a first-place finish in the Smythe Division and to the first playoff appearance in its history.

Maloney died on February 21, 2020, aged 92.

== Career statistics ==
=== Regular season and playoffs ===
			Regular season					Playoffs
Season	Team	League	GP	G	A	Pts	PIM	GP	G	A	Pts	PIM
1944–45	Ottawa St. Pats	OCJHL	12	14	6	20	5	5	5	4	9	0
1944–45	Ottawa St. Pats	M-Cup	—	—	—	—	—	5	0	2	2	5
1945–46	Ottawa St. Pats	OCJHL	12	18	9	27	9	5	0	8	8	0
1946–47	Shawinigan Falls Cataracts	QSHL	34	10	15	25	4	4	3	3	6	0
1947–48	Shawinigan Falls Cataracts	QSHL	48	18	46	64	24	7	2	6	8	0
1948–49	Hershey Bears	AHL	64	29	50	79	21	11	5	6	11	2
1949–50	Boston Bruins	NHL	70	15	31	46	6	—	—	—	—	—
1950–51	Boston Bruins	NHL	13	2	0	2	2	—	—	—	—	—
1950–51	Toronto Maple Leafs	NHL	1	1	0	1	0	—	—	—	—	—
1950–51	Pittsburgh Hornets	AHL	54	13	23	36	14	5	2	0	2	2
1951–52	Pittsburgh Hornets	AHL	66	19	37	56	25	5	0	1	1	0
1952–53	Toronto Maple Leafs	NHL	29	2	6	8	2	—	—	—	—	—
1952–53	Pittsburgh Hornets	AHL	28	8	22	30	22	—	—	—	—	—
1953–54	Pittsburgh Hornets	AHL	35	7	11	18	20	—	—	—	—	—
1953–54	Ottawa Senators	QSHL	27	9	13	22	37	22	8	6	14	18
1954–55	Ottawa Senators	QSHL	25	8	14	22	7	—	—	—	—	—
1954–55	Vancouver Canucks	WHL	37	16	27	43	9	5	2	2	4	0
1955–56	Vancouver Canucks	WHL	70	37	58	95	14	15	8	7	15	4
1956–57	Vancouver Canucks	WHL	70	43	55	98	8	—	—	—	—	—
1957–58	Vancouver Canucks	WHL	70	35	59	94	0	11	8	17	25	4
1958–59	Vancouver Canucks	WHL	13	8	9	17	2	—	—	—	—	—
1958–59	Chicago Black Hawks	NHL	24	2	2	4	6	6	0	0	0	0
1959–60	Chicago Black Hawks	NHL	21	6	4	10	0	—	—	—	—	—
1959–60	Buffalo Bisons	AHL	46	21	41	62	14	—	—	—	—	—
1960–61	Buffalo Bisons	AHL	71	37	65	102	27	4	0	3	3	0
1961–62	Vancouver Canucks	WHL	70	34	52	86	2	—	—	—	—	—
1962–63	Vancouver Canucks	WHL	64	29	61	90	8	7	2	7	9	0
1963–64	Vancouver Canucks	WHL	65	28	53	81	38	—	—	—	—	—
1964–65	Vancouver Canucks	WHL	69	29	52	81	18	5	1	5	6	0
1965–66	Vancouver Canucks	WHL	65	22	51	73	16	7	5	8	13	0
1966–67	Vancouver Canucks	WHL	72	17	49	66	42	8	1	6	7	0
1967–68	Vancouver Canucks	WHL	72	22	46	68	6	—	—	—	—	—
1968–69	Vancouver Canucks	WHL	65	4	24	28	19	2	0	0	0	0
1969–70	Vancouver Canucks	WHL	16	2	1	3	0	—	—	—	—	—
WHL totals			818	326	597	923	182	60	27	52	79	8
NHL totals			158	28	43	71	16	6	0	0	0	0

=== Coaching record ===
			Regular season					Playoffs
Season	Team	League	GC	W	L	T	Finish	GC	W	L	Result
1972–73	Seattle Totems	WHL	72	26	32	14	5th, WHL	—	—	—	—
1973–74	Seattle Totems	WHL	—	—	—	—	—	—	—	—	—
1973–74	Vancouver Canucks	NHL	37	15	18	4	7th, East	—	—	—	—
1974–75	Vancouver Canucks	NHL	80	38	32	10	1st, Smythe	5	1	4	Lost in Quarterfinals
1975–76	Vancouver Canucks	NHL	80	33	32	15	2nd, Smythe	2	0	2	Lost in Preliminary
1976–77	Vancouver Canucks	NHL	35	9	23	3	—	—	—	—	—
NHL totals			232	95	105	32	—	—	—	—	—

Preceded by Bill McCreary	Head coach of the Vancouver Canucks; 1974–77	Succeeded by Orland Kurtenbach
Preceded by Hal Laycoe	General Manager of the Vancouver Canucks; 1974–76	Succeeded by Jake Milford
