= Frank Ashworth =

Canadian ice hockey player (1926–2021)

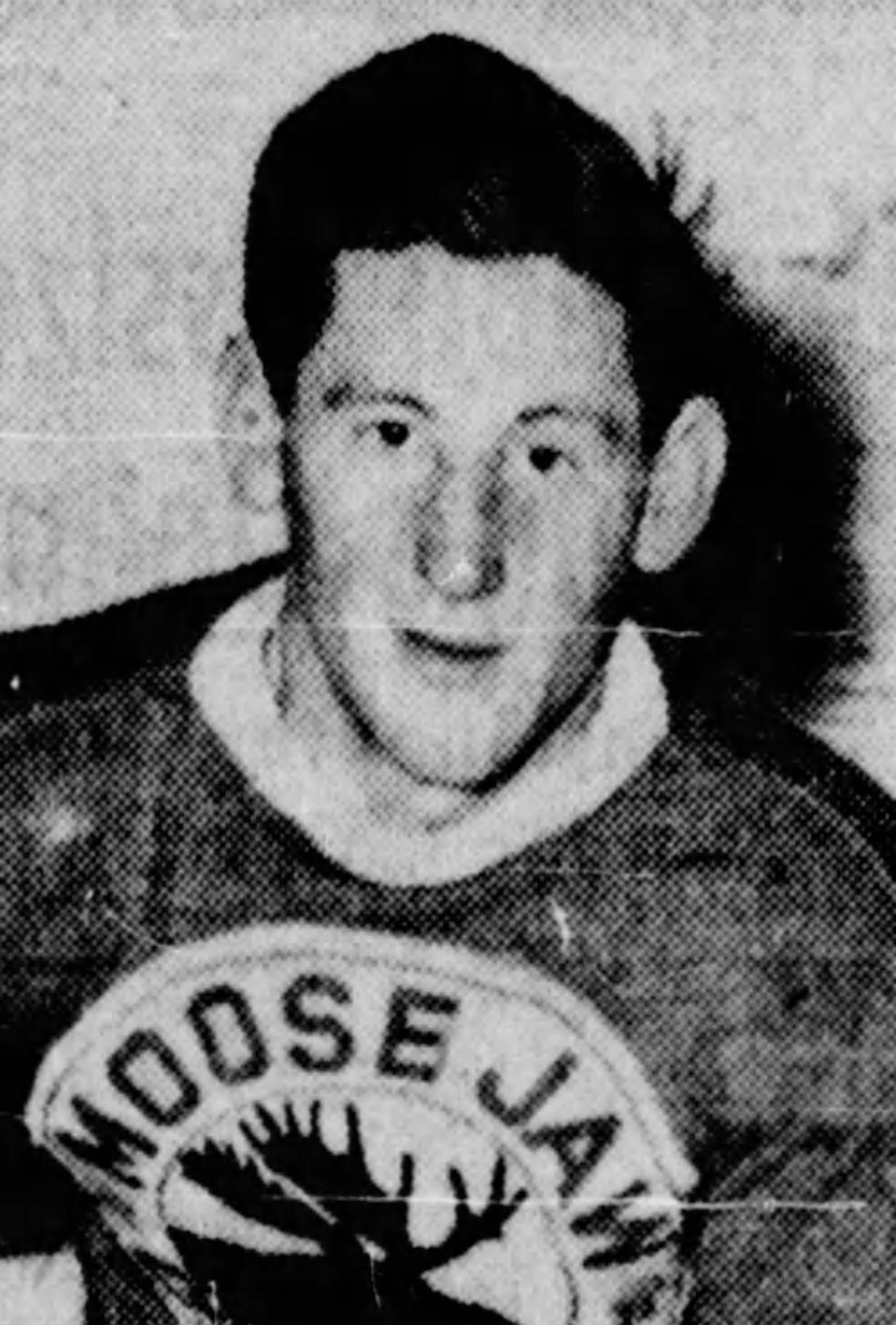
- Ashworth pictured in a 1947 newspaper
- Born: October 16, 1926; Moose Jaw, Saskatchewan, Canada
- Died: July 30, 2021 (aged 94)
- Height: 5 ft 9 in (175 cm)
- Weight: 165 lb (75 kg; 11 st 11 lb)
- Position: Centre
- Shot: Left
- Played for: Chicago Black Hawks
- Playing career: 1943–1957

Frank Winsor Ashworth (October 16, 1926 – July 30, 2021) was a Canadian professional ice hockey centre. He played 18 games in the National Hockey League with the Chicago Black Hawks during the 1946–47 season. The rest of his career, which lasted from 1943 to 1957, was spent in various minor leagues.

== Career statistics ==
=== Regular season and playoffs ===
			Regular season					Playoffs
Season	Team	League	GP	G	A	Pts	PIM	GP	G	A	Pts	PIM
1943–44	New York Rovers	EAHL	17	10	1	11	16	—	—	—	—	—
1943–44	Brooklyn Crescents	EAHL	30	15	19	34	7	11	3	6	9	10
1944–45	Moose Jaw Canucks	S-SJHL	16	22	13	35	26	4	6	5	11	8
1944–45	Moose Jaw Canucks	M-Cup	—	—	—	—	—	17	11	22	33	8
1945–46	Moose Jaw Canucks	S-SJHL	16	30	20	50	17	4	5	5	10	4
1945–46	Moose Jaw Canucks	M-Cup	—	—	—	—	—	8	8	8	16	2
1946–47	Chicago Black Hawks	NHL	18	5	4	9	2	—	—	—	—	—
1946–47	Kansas City Pla-Mors	USHL	47	17	23	40	47	—	—	—	—	—
1947–48	Kansas City Pla-Mors	USHL	66	19	27	46	40	7	3	1	4	4
1948–49	Hershey Bears	AHL	8	0	0	0	2	—	—	—	—	—
1948–49	Tulsa Oilers	USHL	58	36	60	96	27	7	3	5	8	14
1949–50	Tulsa Oilers	USHL	70	28	50	78	44	—	—	—	—	—
1950–51	Tulsa Oilers	USHL	—	—	—	—	—	—	—	—	—	—
1951–52	Calgary Stampeders	PCHL	55	22	26	48	69	—	—	—	—	—
1952–53	Calgary Stampeders	WHL	70	15	26	41	66	5	3	3	6	0
1953–54	Calgary Stampeders	WHL	67	24	42	66	28	18	5	11	16	21
1954–55	Vancouver Canucks	WHL	51	5	7	12	20	5	0	1	1	2
1955–56	Olds Elks	AIHA	—	—	—	—	—	—	—	—	—	—
1956–57	Calgary Stampeders	WHL	48	11	20	31	33	3	0	1	1	0
1957–58	Olds B's	ChHL	—	—	—	—	—	—	—	—	—	—
1958–59	Olds B's	ChHL	—	—	—	—	—	—	—	—	—	—
1959–60	Olds B's	ChHL	—	—	—	—	—	—	—	—	—	—
1964–65	Olds B's	ChHL	—	—	—	—	—	—	—	—	—	—
1965–66	Calgary Spurs	WCSHL	27	8	13	21	6	3	2	1	3	2
USHL totals			241	100	160	260	158	14	6	6	12	18
WHL totals			236	55	95	150	147	31	8	16	24	23
NHL totals			18	5	4	9	2	—	—	—	—	—
