= Gerry Melnyk =

Canadian ice hockey player

- Born: September 16, 1934; Edmonton, Alberta, Canada
- Died: June 14, 2001 (aged 66); Edmonton, Alberta, Canada
- Height: 5 ft 10 in (178 cm)
- Weight: 165 lb (75 kg; 11 st 11 lb)
- Position: Centre
- Shot: Right
- Played for: Detroit Red Wings; Chicago Black Hawks; St. Louis Blues
- Playing career: 1953–1968

Michael Gerald Melnyk (September 16, 1934 – June 14, 2001) was a Canadian professional ice hockey forward who played in the National Hockey League (NHL) for the Detroit Red Wings, Chicago Black Hawks and St. Louis Blues between 1956 and 1968. The rest of his career, which lasted from 1953 to 1968, was spent in the minor leagues. After retiring in 1968, Melnyk became a scout with the Philadelphia Flyers, a role he would remain at until 1997.

== Playing career ==
Melnyk began his NHL career with the Detroit Red Wings during the 1956 Stanley Cup playoffs. He also played for the Chicago Black Hawks and St. Louis Blues. After playing the 1967–68 season with the Blues, Melnyk was traded to the Philadelphia Flyers but retired a week prior to the start of the new season. He became a scout for the Flyers and successfully lobbied for the selection of Bobby Clarke at the 1969 NHL Amateur Draft. In 269 regular season NHL games, Melnyk recorded 39 goals and 77 assists for 116 career points.

== Career statistics ==
=== Regular season and playoffs ===
			Regular season					Playoffs
Season	Team	League	GP	G	A	Pts	PIM	GP	G	A	Pts	PIM
1951–52	Edmonton Oil Kings	WCJHL	42	29	29	58	24	9	9	4	13	2
1952–53	Edmonton Oil Kings	WCJHL	36	27	28	55	22	9	5	8	13	6
1952–53	Edmonton Flyers	WHL	—	—	—	—	—	2	0	1	1	0
1953–54	Edmonton Oil Kings	WCJHL	36	39	49	88	25	10	10	15	25	10
1953–54	Edmonton Flyers	WHL	3	1	1	2	0	—	—	—	—	—
1953–54	Edmonton Oil Kings	M-Cup	—	—	—	—	—	14	7	17	24	10
1954–55	Edmonton Flyers	WHL	69	14	29	43	24	9	2	8	10	0
1955–56	Edmonton Flyers	WHL	70	37	50	87	37	3	1	3	4	2
1955–56	Detroit Red Wings	NHL	—	—	—	—	—	6	0	0	0	0
1956–57	Edmonton Flyers	WHL	60	21	44	65	26	8	5	3	8	2
1957–58	Edmonton Flyers	WHL	50	22	40	62	19	—	—	—	—	—
1958–59	Edmonton Flyers	WHL	64	30	37	67	8	3	0	1	1	2
1959–60	Detroit Red Wings	NHL	63	10	10	20	12	6	3	0	3	0
1960–61	Detroit Red Wings	NHL	70	9	16	25	2	11	1	0	1	2
1961–62	Chicago Black Hawks	NHL	63	5	16	21	6	7	0	0	0	2
1962–63	Buffalo Bisons	AHL	72	14	36	50	20	13	6	7	13	4
1963–64	Buffalo Bisons	AHL	70	11	34	45	0	—	—	—	—	—
1963–64	St. Louis Braves	CHL	—	—	—	—	—	6	1	4	5	2
1964–65	Buffalo Bisons	AHL	72	22	47	69	12	9	1	4	5	2
1964–65	Chicago Black Hawks	NHL	—	—	—	—	—	6	0	0	0	0
1965–66	Buffalo Bisons	AHL	69	18	61	79	10	—	—	—	—	—
1966–67	St. Louis Braves	CHL	67	24	47	71	12	—	—	—	—	—
1967–68	St. Louis Blues	NHL	73	15	35	50	14	17	2	6	8	6
WHL totals			316	125	201	326	114	25	8	16	24	6
NHL totals			269	39	77	116	34	53	6	6	12	10
