= Hugh Currie =

Canadian ice hockey player

- Born: October 22, 1925; Saskatoon, Saskatchewan, Canada
- Died: November 21, 2017 (aged 92); Wetaskiwin, Alberta, Canada
- Height: 6 ft 0 in (183 cm)
- Weight: 190 lb (86 kg; 13 st 8 lb)
- Position: Defence
- Shot: Left
- Played for: Montreal Canadiens
- Playing career: 1944–1966

Hugh Roy Currie (October 22, 1925 – November 21, 2017) was a Canadian professional ice hockey defenceman. He played one game in the National Hockey League for the Montreal Canadiens during the 1950–51 season, on December 16, 1950, against the New York Rangers. The rest of his career, which lasted from 1944 to 1966, was spent in the minor leagues.

== Career statistics ==
=== Regular season and playoffs ===
			Regular season					Playoffs
Season	Team	League	GP	G	A	Pts	PIM	GP	G	A	Pts	PIM
1943–44	Saskatoon Lions	SAHA	4	1	4	5	4	2	0	3	3	2
1944–45	Baltimore Blades	EAHL	47	3	15	18	44	11	2	4	6	18
1945–46	Dallas Texans	USHL	18	3	1	4	14	—	—	—	—	—
1945–46	Washington Lions	EAHL	22	1	5	6	33	12	0	6	6	10
1946–47	Houston Huskies	USHL	36	4	8	12	30	—	—	—	—	—
1946–47	Tacoma Rockets	PCHL	18	5	8	13	44	—	—	—	—	—
1947–48	Buffalo Bisons	AHL	9	0	0	0	10	—	—	—	—	—
1947–48	Houston Huskies	USHL	52	5	7	12	67	12	1	0	1	2
1948–49	Houston Huskies	USHL	11	1	1	2	13	—	—	—	—	—
1948–49	San Diego Skyhawks	PCHL	51	4	11	15	52	14	2	6	8	30
1949–50	Louisville Blades	USHL	7	1	6	7	8	—	—	—	—	—
1949–50	Buffalo Bisons	AHL	54	3	25	28	64	5	0	0	0	13
1950–51	Montreal Canadiens	NHL	1	0	0	0	0	—	—	—	—	—
1950–51	Buffalo Bisons	AHL	57	9	56	65	54	4	0	1	1	2
1951–52	Buffalo Bisons	AHL	11	0	4	4	4	—	—	—	—	—
1951–52	Vancouver Canucks	PCHL	34	5	20	25	36	—	—	—	—	—
1952–53	Vancouver Canucks	WHL	68	3	25	28	77	9	2	5	7	10
1953–54	Syracuse Warriors	AHL	41	2	13	15	26	—	—	—	—	—
1953–54	Springfield Indians	QSHL	31	5	21	26	11	—	—	—	—	—
1954–55	Springfield Indians	AHL	64	5	43	48	60	4	0	1	1	4
1955–56	Vancouver Canucks	WHL	69	6	30	36	36	15	0	3	3	6
1956–57	Vancouver Canucks	WHL	68	6	32	38	47	—	—	—	—	—
1957–58	Vancouver Canucks	WHL	70	3	40	43	72	11	1	1	2	10
1958–59	Vancouver Canucks	WHL	67	4	26	30	36	9	0	4	4	10
1959–60	Calgary Stampeders	WHL	66	1	25	26	30	—	—	—	—	—
1960–61	Vancouver Canucks	WHL	70	1	16	17	39	5	0	1	1	0
1961–62	San Francisco Seals	WHL	7	0	1	1	2	—	—	—	—	—
1961–62	Vancouver Canucks	WHL	43	1	13	14	16	—	—	—	—	—
1962–63	Philadelphia Ramblers	EHL	65	2	50	52	31	3	1	0	1	2
1963–64	Edmonton Nuggets	ASHL	—	—	—	—	—	—	—	—	—	—
1964–65	Edmonton Nuggets	ASHL	—	—	—	—	—	—	—	—	—	—
1965–66	Edmonton Nuggets	WCSHL	—	—	—	—	—	—	—	—	—	—
WHL totals			528	25	205	233	355	49	3	14	17	36
NHL totals			1	0	0	0	0	—	—	—	—	—

== See also ==
- List of players who played only one game in the NHL
