= Al Rollins =

Canadian ice hockey player

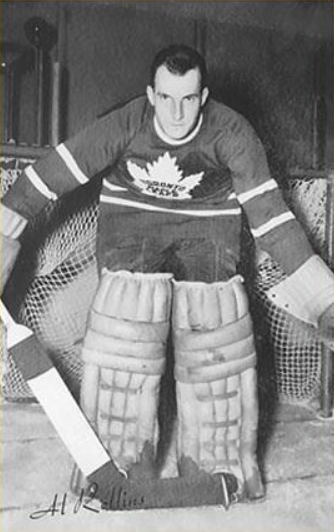
- Born: October 9, 1926 Vanguard, Saskatchewan, Canada
- Died: July 27, 1996 (aged 69) Calgary, Alberta, Canada
- Height: 6 ft 2 in (188 cm)
- Weight: 180 lb (82 kg; 12 st 12 lb)
- Position: Goaltender
- Caught: Left
- Played for: Toronto Maple Leafs; Chicago Black Hawks; New York Rangers
- Playing career: 1949–1962

Elwin Ira Rollins (October 9, 1926 – July 27, 1996) was a Canadian professional ice hockey goaltender who played for the Chicago Black Hawks, New York Rangers and the Toronto Maple Leafs. Rollins was born in Vanguard, Saskatchewan, but grew up in Moose Jaw, Saskatchewan.

== Playing career ==
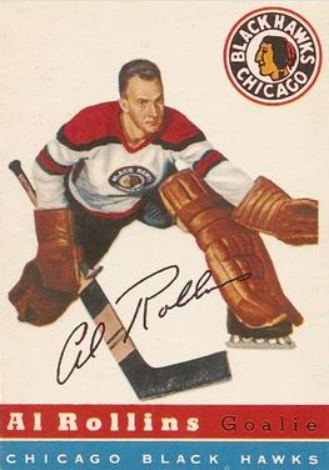
1954 Topps card of Rollins for Chicago Black Hawks

Before joining the NHL, Rollins played with the Vancouver Canucks in the PCHL. Next year, Rollins at age 21, moved to Edmonton to play for the Edmonton Flyers. Rollins believed the Flyers were a team capable of capturing the Allan Cup and he also believed if he played well enough he might get signed into the NHL. Rollins' gamble paid off and the Edmonton Flyers won the Allan Cup in 1947–48. He played 24 games that season, winning 20 and posting a 1.93 GAA.

Rollins played in the minor leagues for a couple of years before he was signed by the Toronto Maple Leafs in 1950–51. Rumors had it that he was there to simply put pressure on Turk Broda to lose weight. This was not exactly true as the Leafs also needed to shore up their rapidly thinning goaltender depth chart. That season the Maple Leafs won the Stanley Cup.

Rollins could not convince the Leafs management that he could be their full-time goaltender. In 1951–52, he was traded to the Chicago Black Hawks for veteran Harry Lumley. For five years he played for the Black Hawks, a team that usually finished last in the NHL which majorly contributed to his 141-205-83 record. But despite that, hockey pundits saw Rollins as one of the league's best goaltenders.

In 1953–54, he played in the NHL All-Star Game and was awarded the Hart Trophy after he played in 66 games during Chicago's franchise-worst 51-loss season. He posted a 3.23 GAA with seven shutouts and 47 losses, but finished first in voting for the award ahead of Detroit's Red Kelly and Montréal's Maurice Richard.

Rollins is, as of 2025, one of four eligible players, along with Tommy Anderson, Jose Theodore, and Carey Price, to win the Hart Memorial Trophy and not be elected to the Hockey Hall of Fame.

In 1957–58, the Chicago Black Hawks acquired Glenn Hall from the Detroit Red Wings. Rollins was sent to the minor leagues as the Black Hawks preferred Hall. He would stay in the minor leagues until 1959–60, when he was signed on by the New York Rangers. He played 10 games with the club before he was sent back to the minor leagues again. This would mark the end of his NHL career. In 1966, although he was 37 years old, Rollins helped the Drumheller Miners to an Allan Cup victory in 1965–66.

== Coaching career ==
After retiring, Rollins became a coach. He coached the University of Calgary hockey team as well as clubs in Spokane, Salt Lake City, Houston, Tulsa, and Phoenix. As a coach, he achieved a good measure of success, including an Allan Cup victory with the Spokane Jets in 1970. Rollins was named coach of the World Hockey Association's (WHA) Phoenix Roadrunners in 1976, replacing local favourite Sandy Hucul. Rollins was generally hated in Phoenix after his years as coach of the WHL rival Salt Lake Golden Eagles, and his tenure in Phoenix resulted in the demise of the Roadrunner franchise after only one season at the helm.

Rollins' son Jerry played in the now-defunct WHA.

== Awards and achievements ==
- Vezina Trophy Winner (1951)
- Stanley Cup Championship (1951)
- Hart Memorial Trophy Winner (1954)
- Played in NHL All-Star Game (1954)
- Allan Cup Championships as a player (1948, 1966)
- Allan Cup Championship as a coach (1970)

== Career statistics ==
=== Regular season and playoffs ===
			Regular season									Playoffs
Season	Team	League	GP	W	L	T	MIN	GA	SO	GAA	SV%	GP	W	L	T	MIN	GA	SO	GAA	SV%
1942–43	Moose Jaw Canucks	S-SJHL	15	6	7	2	900	51	0	3.40	—	2	0	2	—	120	7	0	3.50	—
1943–44	New York Rovers	EAHL	22	—	—	—	1290	120	0	5.58	—	—	—	—	—	—	—	—	—	—
1944–45	Seattle Stars	PCHL	27	20	6	1	1620	84	1	3.11	—	6	4	2	—	—	—	0	3.67	—
1944–45	New Westminster Cubs	PCJHL	16	11	5	0	960	33	2	2.06	—	4	2	2	—	250	19	0	4.56	—
1945–46	Seattle Ironmen	PCHL	55	27	28	0	3300	210	2	3.65	—	3	—	—	—	180	12	0	4.00	—
1946–47	Vancouver Canucks	PCHL	54	27	26	1	3240	253	0	4.59	—	4	1	3	—	240	17	0	4.25	—
1947–48	Edmonton Flyers	WCSHL	46	24	20	2	2800	167	1	3.20	—	10	8	1	1	600	32	0	3.20	—
1947–48	Edmonton Flyers	Al-Cup	—	—	—	—	—	—	—	—	—	14	12	2	—	840	27	4	1.93	—
1948–49	Kansas City Pla-Mors	USHL	60	29	21	10	3600	189	1	3.16	—	2	0	2	—	120	6	0	3.00	—
1949–50	Cleveland Barons	AHL	6	4	0	2	360	17	0	2.83	—	—	—	—	—	—	—	—	—	—
1949–50	Toronto Maple Leafs	NHL	2	1	1	0	100	4	1	2.40	—	—	—	—	—	—	—	—	—	—
1949–50	Pittsburgh Hornets	AHL	20	9	7	4	1200	43	3	2.15	—	—	—	—	—	—	—	—	—	—
1950–51	Toronto Maple Leafs	NHL	40	27	5	8	2373	70	5	1.77	—	4	3	1	—	210	6	0	1.71	—
1951–52	Toronto Maple Leafs	NHL	70	29	24	16	4170	154	5	2.22	—	2	0	2	—	120	6	0	3.00	—
1952–53	Chicago Black Hawks	NHL	70	27	28	15	4200	175	6	2.50	—	7	3	4	—	425	18	0	2.54	.927
1953–54	Chicago Black Hawks	NHL	66	12	47	7	3960	213	5	3.23	—	—	—	—	—	—	—	—	—	—
1954–55	Chicago Black Hawks	NHL	44	9	27	8	2640	150	0	3.41	—	—	—	—	—	—	—	—	—	—
1955–56	Chicago Black Hawks	NHL	58	17	30	11	3480	171	3	2.95	.917	—	—	—	—	—	—	—	—	—
1955–56	Buffalo Bisons	AHL	6	2	3	1	360	25	1	4.17	—	—	—	—	—	—	—	—	—	—
1956–57	Chicago Black Hawks	NHL	70	16	39	15	4200	224	3	3.20	.900	—	—	—	—	—	—	—	—	—
1957–58	Calgary Stampeders	WHL	68	30	33	5	4130	214	3	3.11	.893	14	6	8	—	880	47	0	3.20	—
1958–59	Winnipeg Warriors	WHL	31	17	14	0	1860	99	3	3.19	.892	7	3	4	—	420	22	0	3.14	—
1959–60	Winnipeg Warriors	WHL	55	22	31	2	3300	193	2	3.51	—	—	—	—	—	—	—	—	—	—
1959–60	New York Rangers	NHL	10	3	4	3	600	31	0	3.10	.918	—	—	—	—	—	—	—	—	—
1961–62	Portland Buckaroos	WHL	8	5	3	0	480	18	1	2.25	—	7	3	4	—	432	18	0	2.49	—
1964–65	Drumheller Miners	ASHL	—	—	—	—	—	—	—	—	—	—	—	—	—	—	—	—	—	—
1965–66	Drumheller Miners	ASHL	—	—	—	—	—	—	—	—	—	2	2	0	—	120	3	0	1.50	—
1965–66	Drumheller Miners	Al-Cup	—	—	—	—	—	—	—	—	—	15	12	3	—	911	32	2	2.11	—
1968–69	Spokane Jets	WIHL	1	1	0	0	60	4	0	4.00	—	—	—	—	—	—	—	—	—	—
NHL totals			430	141	205	83	25,723	1192	28	2.78	—	13	6	7	—	755	30	0	2.38	—

== Coaching record ==
Team	Year	Regular season						Postseason
Team	Year	G	W	L	T	Pts	Finish	Result
Phoenix Roadrunners	1976–77	80	28	48	4	60	6th in WHA West	Missed playoffs

Preceded by Gordie Howe	Winner of the Hart Trophy; 1954	Succeeded by Ted Kennedy
Preceded by Bill Durnan	Winner of the Vezina Trophy; 1951	Succeeded by Terry Sawchuk
