= Jack Hendrickson =

Canadian ice hockey player (1936–2016)

- Born: December 5, 1936; Kingston, Ontario, Canada
- Died: June 27, 2016 (aged 79)
- Height: 5 ft 11 in (180 cm)
- Weight: 175 lb (79 kg; 12 st 7 lb)
- Position: Defenceman
- Shot: Right
- Played for: Detroit Red Wings
- Playing career: 1957–1971

John Gunnard "Jack, Jake" Hendrickson (December 5, 1936 – June 27, 2016) was a Canadian ice hockey player who played 5 games in the National Hockey League with the Detroit Red Wings between 1957 and 1962. The rest of his career, which lasted from 1957 to 1971, was spent in various minor leagues.

== Career ==
Hendrickson was born in Kingston, Ontario. In 2004, he was inducted as a player into the Midland, Ontario Sports Hall of Fame. He had previously been inducted twice; first in 1996, as a member of the Midland team that won the 1958 Ontario Baseball Association Intermediate 'A' championship and second, in 1998, as a member of the 1953-54 Midland Red Wings hockey team. Hendrickson starred on defence when this team, coached by Hockey Hall of Famer Roy Conacher, won the Ontario Hockey Association Junior C championship.

Hendrickson played professional hockey from 1954-55 through the 1970-71 season. He played a total of five games in the National Hockey League with the Detroit Red Wings. He also played in the American Hockey League, the Eastern Professional Hockey League, the Western Hockey League, the Central Professional Hockey League, the International Hockey League, and the Eastern Hockey League.

== Career statistics ==
=== Regular season and playoffs ===
			Regular season					Playoffs
Season	Team	League	GP	G	A	Pts	PIM	GP	G	A	Pts	PIM
1953–54	Hamilton Tiger Cubs	OHA	4	0	0	0	0	—	—	—	—	—
1953–54	Midland Greenshirts	OHA-B	—	—	—	—	—	—	—	—	—	—
1954–55	Hamilton Tiger Cubs	OHA	38	1	7	8	15	3	0	0	0	0
1955–56	Hamilton Tiger Cubs	OHA	44	10	14	24	98	—	—	—	—	—
1956–57	Hamilton Tiger Cubs	OHA	46	6	9	15	120	4	0	0	0	2
1956–57	Springfield Indians	AHL	2	0	0	0	2	—	—	—	—	—
1957–58	Detroit Red Wings	NHL	1	0	0	0	0	—	—	—	—	—
1957–58	Edmonton Flyers	WHL	62	4	10	14	88	5	1	1	2	6
1958–59	Detroit Red Wings	NHL	3	0	0	0	2	—	—	—	—	—
1958–59	Hershey Bears	AHL	2	0	0	0	4	—	—	—	—	—
1958–59	Springfield Indians	AHL	13	0	0	0	4	—	—	—	—	—
1958–59	Edmonton Flyers	WHL	35	5	10	15	39	2	0	0	0	0
1959–60	Seattle Totems	WHL	1	0	0	0	0	—	—	—	—	—
1959–60	Sudbury Wolves	EPHL	64	8	27	35	71	3	1	1	2	4
1960–61	Sudbury Wolves	EPHL	48	9	14	23	67	—	—	—	—	—
1961–62	Detroit Red Wings	NHL	1	0	0	0	2	—	—	—	—	—
1961–62	Sudbury Wolves	EPHL	69	18	22	40	98	4	1	3	4	6
1962–63	Calgary Stampeders	WHL	61	14	35	49	64	—	—	—	—	—
1963–64	St. Louis Braves	CPHL	70	6	32	38	86	6	1	5	6	4
1964–65	St. Louis Braves	CPHL	25	2	12	14	30	—	—	—	—	—
1964–65	Los Angeles Blades	WHL	14	2	4	6	12	—	—	—	—	—
1965–66	Los Angeles Blades	WHL	67	10	44	54	61	—	—	—	—	—
1965–66	Los Angeles Blades	WHL	57	3	25	28	63	—	—	—	—	—
1967–68	Port Huron Flags	IHL	22	4	12	16	20	—	—	—	—	—
1968–69	Des Moines Oak Leafs	IHL	30	2	14	16	25	—	—	—	—	—
1968–69	Fort Wayne Komets	IHL	36	3	11	14	27	6	1	3	4	0
1969–70	Long Island Ducks	EHL	46	5	40	45	38	—	—	—	—	—
1970–71	Port Huron Flags	IHL	21	5	3	8	16	—	—	—	—	—
1970–71	Cranbrook Royals	WIHL	30	2	14	16	25	—	—	—	—	—
WHL totals			297	38	128	166	327	7	1	1	2	6
NHL totals			5	0	0	0	4	—	—	—	—	—
