= Chuck Blair =

Canadian ice hockey player (1928–2006)

- Born: July 23, 1928 Edinburgh, Scotland, United Kingdom
- Died: December 14, 2006 (aged 78) Fort Erie, Ontario, Canada
- Height: 5 ft 10 in (178 cm)
- Weight: 175 lb (79 kg; 12 st 7 lb)
- Position: Right wing
- Shot: Right
- Played for: Toronto Maple Leafs
- Playing career: 1948–1961

Charlie Franklin Blair (July 23, 1928 – December 14, 2006) was a Canadian ice hockey player born in Scotland. He made a single National Hockey League appearance with the Toronto Maple Leafs during the 1948–49 season, playing on December 4, 1948, against the Chicago Black Hawks. The remainder of his career, spanning from 1948 to 1961, was spent primarily in the American Hockey League.

== Playing career ==
Blair was born in Edinburgh, Scotland, and immigrated to Canada with his family as an infant, settling in South Porcupine, Ontario. Growing up in northern Ontario, he developed a passion for hockey and honed his skills on outdoor rinks, eventually earning a place with the Oshawa Generals at the junior level. His play with Oshawa caught the attention of scouts, and he was called up by the Toronto Maple Leafs, where he made his lone National Hockey League appearance. Following that brief stint, Blair continued to develop his game with the Toronto Marlboros before signing with the Pittsburgh Hornets of the American Hockey League in 1950. Over the next several years, he built a steady professional career in the AHL, being traded to the Cleveland Barons in 1953 and then to the Buffalo Bisons in 1954. In 1957, seeking new opportunities, Blair joined the Western Hockey League's Calgary Stampeders, where he spent two productive seasons before returning east to rejoin the AHL with the Quebec Aces. He eventually closed out his playing days with one final campaign in the Eastern Hockey League, suiting up for the Clinton Comets before hanging up his skates in 1961. Notably, Blair came from a hockey family, as his brother, George Blair, also enjoyed a professional career on the ice.

== Career statistics ==
=== Regular season and playoffs ===
			Regular season					Playoffs
Season	Team	League	GP	G	A	Pts	PIM	GP	G	A	Pts	PIM
1946–47	Oshawa Generals	OHA	28	19	22	41	6	—	—	—	—	—
1947–48	Oshawa Generals	OHA	33	18	20	38	24	6	0	1	1	13
1948–49	Toronto Maple Leafs	NHL	1	0	0	0	0	—	—	—	—	—
1948–49	Toronto Marlboros	OHA Sr	36	21	14	35	47	10	6	5	11	6
1948–49	Toronto Marlboros	Al-Cup	—	—	—	—	—	13	4	5	9	10
1949–50	Toronto Marlboros	OHA Sr	39	21	23	44	36	14	5	4	9	4
1949–50	Toronto Marlboros	Al-Cup	—	—	—	—	—	17	8	9	17	17
1950–51	Pittsburgh Hornets	AHL	71	27	16	43	41	13	6	1	7	8
1951–52	Pittsburgh Hornets	AHL	57	13	25	38	22	11	1	2	3	6
1952–53	Pittsburgh Hornets	AHL	48	17	18	35	16	10	2	3	5	10
1953–54	Cleveland Barons	AHL	59	23	15	38	2	9	4	3	7	2
1954–55	Cleveland Barons	AHL	21	3	4	7	0	—	—	—	—	—
1954–55	Buffalo Bisons	AHL	38	9	13	22	8	10	5	0	5	0
1955–56	Buffalo Bisons	AHL	56	17	16	33	20	5	3	1	4	4
1956–57	Buffalo Bisons	AHL	64	19	18	37	22	—	—	—	—	—
1957–58	Calgary Stampeders	WHL	65	25	23	48	31	14	2	9	11	0
1958–59	Calgary Stampeders	WHL	35	19	15	34	6	8	4	0	4	4
1959–60	Quebec Aces	AHL	48	8	12	20	8	—	—	—	—	—
1960–61	Clinton Comets	EHL	61	21	41	62	12	4	0	1	1	0
AHL totals			462	136	137	273	139	58	21	10	31	30
NHL totals			1	0	0	0	0	—	—	—	—	—

== See also ==
- List of National Hockey League players born in the United Kingdom
- List of players who played only one game in the NHL
