= Gordon Vejprava =

Canadian ice hockey player (1933–2023)

- Born: May 2, 1933 Blairmore, Alberta, Canada
- Died: December 9, 2023 (aged 90) Calgary, Alberta, Canada
- Height: 5 ft 8 in (173 cm)
- Weight: 165 lb (75 kg; 11 st 11 lb)
- Position: Center
- Shot: Left
- Played for: Cleveland Barons; Providence Reds; Marion Barons; Toledo Mercurys; Vancouver Canucks; Calgary Stampeders; Vancouver Canucks; Los Angeles Blades; Denver Spurs
- Playing career: 1949–1971

Gordon Hudson Vejprava (May 2, 1933 – December 9, 2023) was a Canadian professional ice hockey player who played for the Cleveland Barons and Providence Reds in the American Hockey League. He also played for the Marion Barons and Toledo Mercurys in the International Hockey League, and the Calgary Stampeders, Vancouver Canucks, Los Angeles Blades, and Denver Spurs in the Western Hockey League. Vejprava died in Calgary, Alberta on December 9, 2023, at the age of 90.
