= 1959–60 WHL season =

- League: Western Hockey League
- Sport: Ice hockey
- Number of games: 70
- Number of teams: 7

Regular season
- Season champions: Vancouver Canucks
- Season MVP: Guyle Fielder (Seattle) and Hank Bassen (Vancouver)
- Top scorer: Guyle Fielder (Seattle)

President's Cup
- Champions: Vancouver Canucks
- Runners-up: Victoria Cougars

Seasons
- ← 1958–59 1960–61 →

The 1959–60 WHL season was the eighth season of the Western Hockey League. The Vancouver Canucks were the President's Cup champions as they beat the Victoria Cougars in five games to two in the final series.

Both the Saskatoon Quakers and New Westminster Royals announced they would not play the season, leaving the league with seven teams.

== Teams ==
1959–60 Western Hockey League
Team	City	Arena	Capacity
Calgary Stampeders	Calgary, Alberta	Stampede Corral	6,475
Edmonton Flyers	Edmonton, Alberta	Edmonton Stock Pavilion	6,000
Seattle Totems	Seattle, Washington	Civic Ice Arena	5,000
Spokane Comets	Spokane, Washington	Spokane Coliseum	5,400
Vancouver Canucks	Vancouver, British Columbia	PNE Forum	5,050
Victoria Cougars	Victoria, British Columbia	Victoria Memorial Arena	5,000
Winnipeg Warriors	Winnipeg, Manitoba	Winnipeg Arena	9,500

=== Map of teams ===
WHL Teams

== Final standings ==
League Standings
R	Team	GP	W	L	T	GF	GA	Pts
**1**	**Vancouver Canucks**	**70**	**44**	**20**	**6**	**230**	**177**	**94**
**2**	**Seattle Totems**	**70**	**38**	**28**	**4**	**270**	**219**	**80**
**3**	**Victoria Cougars**	**70**	**37**	**29**	**4**	**227**	**194**	**78**
**4**	**Edmonton Flyers**	**70**	**37**	**29**	**4**	**246**	**240**	**78**
5	Calgary Stampeders	70	32	36	2	245	227	66
6	Winnipeg Warriors	70	25	42	3	224	262	53
7	Spokane Comets	70	19	48	3	201	324	41

bold – qualified for playoffs

== Playoffs ==
Semifinals
1	Vancouver Canucks	4
4	Edmonton Flyers	0
2	Seattle Totems	0
4	Victoria Cougars	4

Finals
1	Vancouver Canucks	5
4	Victoria Cougars	2

The Vancouver Canucks defeated the Victoria Cougars 5 games to 2 to win the President's Cup.

== All Star Team ==
Position	Player
G	Hank Bassen, Vancouver Canucks
D	Gord Sinclair, Seattle Totems
D	Brent MacNab, Vancouver Canucks
C	Guyle Fielder, Seattle Totems
RW	Lou Jankowski, Calgary Stampeders
LW	Al Johnson, Spokane Comets

== Bibliography ==
- Stott, Jon C. (2008), Ice Warriors: The Pacific Coast/Western Hockey League 1948–1974, Surrey, British Columbia: Heritage House Publishing, ISBN 978-1-894974-54-7
- Stott, Jon C. (2011). Ice Warriors The Pacific Coast/Western Hockey League 1948-1974. Heritage House. ISBN 978-1-927051-04-7.
