= 1962–63 WHL season =

- League: Western Hockey League
- Sport: Ice hockey
- Games: 70
- Teams: 8

Regular season
- Season MVP: Phil Maloney (Vancouver Canucks)
- Top scorer: Guyle Fielder (Seattle)

President's Cup
- Champions: San Francisco Seals
- Runners-up: Seattle Totems

Seasons
- 1961–62 1963–64

The 1962–63 WHL season was the 11th season of the Western Hockey League. The San Francisco Seals were the Lester Patrick Cup champions as they beat the Seattle Totems four games to three in the final series.

Phil Maloney of Vancouver was named the most valuable player, while Guyle Fielder led the league in scoring.

== Teams ==
1962–63 Western Hockey League
Division	Team	City	Arena	Capacity
Northern	Calgary Stampeders	Calgary, Alberta	Stampede Corral	6,475
Northern	Edmonton Flyers	Edmonton, Alberta	Edmonton Stock Pavilion	6,000
Northern	Seattle Totems	Seattle, Washington	Civic Ice Arena	5,000
Northern	Vancouver Canucks	Vancouver, British Columbia	PNE Forum	5,050
Southern	Los Angeles Blades	Los Angeles, California	Los Angeles Sports Arena	14,546
Southern	Portland Buckaroos	Portland, Oregon	Memorial Coliseum	12,000
Southern	San Francisco Seals	San Francisco, California	Cow Palace	11,089
Southern	Spokane Comets	Spokane, Washington	Spokane Coliseum	5,400

=== Map of teams ===
Northern Division Southern Division

== Final standings ==
Northern Division Standings
R	Team	GP	W	L	T	GF	GA	Pts
**1**	**Vancouver Canucks**	**70**	**35**	**31**	**4**	**243**	**234**	**74**
**2**	**Seattle Totems**	**70**	**35**	**33**	**2**	**239**	**237**	**72**
**3**	**Edmonton Flyers**	**70**	**24**	**44**	**2**	**215**	**309**	**50**
4	Calgary Stampeders	70	23	45	2	227	284	48

Southern Division Standings
R	Team	GP	W	L	T	GF	GA	Pts
**1**	**Portland Buckaroos**	**70**	**43**	**21**	**6**	**279**	**184**	**92**
**2**	**San Francisco Seals**	**70**	**44**	**25**	**1**	**288**	**219**	**89**
**3**	**Los Angeles Blades**	**70**	**35**	**32**	**3**	**235**	**226**	**73**
4	Spokane Comets	70	30	38	2	219	252	62

bold - qualified for playoffs

== Playoffs ==
Preliminary round
Vancouver Canucks	–
(First-round bye)	–
Seattle Totems	2
Edmonton Flyers	1
Portland Buckaroos	–
(First-round bye)	–
San Francisco Seals	2
Los Angeles Blades	1

Semifinals
Seattle Totems	4
Vancouver Canucks	3
San Francisco Seals	4
Portland Buckaroos	3

Finals
San Francisco Seals	4
Seattle Totems	3

The San Francisco Seals defeated the Seattle Totems 4 games to 3 to win the Lester Patrick Cup.

== Bibliography ==
- Stott, Jon C. (2008), Ice Warriors: The Pacific Coast/Western Hockey League 1948–1974, Surrey, British Columbia: Heritage House Publishing, ISBN 978-1-894974-54-7
