= 1953–54 WHL season =

- League: Western Hockey League
- Sport: Ice hockey
- Games: 70
- Teams: 7

Regular season
- Season champions: Vancouver Canucks

President's Cup
- Champions: Calgary Stampeders
- Runners-up: Vancouver Canucks

Seasons
- 1952–53 1954–55

The 1953–54 WHL season was the second season of the Western Hockey League. The Calgary Stampeders were the President's Cup champions as they beat the Vancouver Canucks four games to two in the final series.

== Teams ==
1953–54 Western Hockey League
Team	City	Arena	Capacity
Calgary Stampeders	Calgary, Alberta	Stampede Corral	6,475
Edmonton Flyers	Edmonton, Alberta	Edmonton Stock Pavilion	6,000
New Westminster Royals	New Westminster, British Columbia	Queen's Park Arena	3,500
Saskatoon Quakers	Saskatoon, Saskatchewan	Saskatoon Arena	3,304
Seattle Bombers	Seattle, Washington	Civic Ice Arena	5,000
Vancouver Canucks	Vancouver, British Columbia	PNE Forum	5,050
Victoria Cougars	Victoria, British Columbia	Victoria Memorial Arena	5,000

=== Map of teams ===
WHL Teams

== Final standings ==
Final Season Standings
R	Team	GP	W	L	T	GF	GA	Pts
**1**	**Vancouver Canucks**	**70**	**39**	**24**	**7**	**218**	**174**	**85**
**2**	**Calgary Stampeders**	**70**	**38**	**25**	**7**	**266**	**206**	**83**
**3**	**Saskatoon Quakers**	**70**	**32**	**29**	**9**	**226**	**214**	**73**
**4**	**Edmonton Flyers**	**70**	**29**	**30**	**11**	**246**	**260**	**69**
**5**	**Victoria Cougars**	**70**	**27**	**32**	**11**	**203**	**223**	**65**
**6**	**New Westminster Royals**	**70**	**28**	**34**	**8**	**218**	**261**	**64**
7	Seattle Bombers	70	22	41	7	209	248	51

bold - qualified for playoffs

== Playoffs ==
Round 1
1	**Vancouver Canucks**	**5**
6	New Westminster Royals	2
2	**Calgary Stampeders**	**4**
5	Victoria Cougars	1
3	Saskatoon Quakers	2
4	**Edmonton Flyers**	**4**

Round 2
1	**Vancouver Canucks**	-
bye	-
2	**Calgary Stampeders**	**4**
4	Edmonton Flyers	2

Finals
1	Vancouver Canucks	2
2	**Calgary Stampeders**	**4**

The Calgary Stampeders win the President's Cup 4 games to 2.

== Awards ==
1953-54 WHL awards
Award	Recipient(s)
President's Cup	Calgary Stampeders
Outstanding Goalkeeper Award	Gump Worsley
Leading Scorer Award	Guyle Fielder
George Leader Cup	Lorne Worsley
Rookie Award	Don Poile
