= 1954–55 WHL season =

- League: Western Hockey League
- Sport: Ice hockey
- Number of games: 70
- Number of teams: 6

Regular season
- Season champions: Edmonton Flyers

President's Cup
- Champions: Edmonton Flyers
- Runners-up: Calgary Stampeders

Seasons
- ← 1953–54 1955–56 →

The 1954–55 WHL season was the third season of the Western Hockey League. The Edmonton Flyers were the President's Cup champions as they beat the Calgary Stampeders in four games in the final series.

== Teams ==
1954–55 Western Hockey League
Team	City	Arena	Capacity
Calgary Stampeders	Calgary, Alberta	Stampede Corral	6,475
Edmonton Flyers	Edmonton, Alberta	Edmonton Stock Pavilion	6,000
New Westminster Royals	New Westminster, British Columbia	Queen's Park Arena	3,500
Saskatoon Quakers	Saskatoon, Saskatchewan	Saskatoon Arena	3,304
Vancouver Canucks	Vancouver, British Columbia	PNE Forum	5,050
Victoria Cougars	Victoria, British Columbia	Victoria Memorial Arena	5,000

=== Map of teams ===
WHL Teams

== Final standings ==
Final Season Standings
R	Team	GP	W	L	T	GF	GA	Pts
**1**	**Edmonton Flyers**	**70**	**39**	**20**	**11**	**273**	**204**	**89**
**2**	**Victoria Cougars**	**70**	**33**	**29**	**8**	**237**	**199**	**74**
**3**	**Vancouver Canucks**	**70**	**31**	**30**	**9**	**207**	**202**	**71**
**4**	**Calgary Stampeders**	**70**	**29**	**29**	**12**	**262**	**258**	**70**
5	New Westminster Royals	70	29	32	9	249	299	67
6	Saskatoon Quakers	70	19	40	11	207	273	49

bold - qualified for playoffs

== Playoffs ==
Round 1
1	**Edmonton Flyers**	**4**
3	Vancouver Canucks	1
2	Victoria Cougars	1
4	**Calgary Stampeders**	**4**

Finals
1	**Edmonton Flyers**	**4**
4	Calgary Stampeders	0

The Edmonton Flyers win the President's Cup 4 games to 0.

== All Star Team ==
Position	Player
G	Glenn Hall, Edmonton Flyers
D	Lloyd Durham, Victoria Cougars
D	Larry Zeidel, Edmonton Flyers
C	Bronco Horvath, Edmonton Flyers
RW	Gerry Couture, Calgary Stampeders
LW	Andy Hebenton, Victoria Cougars
