= 1950 Allan Cup =

Canadian senior ice hockey championship

The Allan Cup was the championship trophy for amateur senior ice hockey in Canada.

The 1950 Allan Cup was the senior ice hockey championship for the Canadian Amateur Hockey Association (CAHA) during the 1949–50 season. The event was hosted by the Calgary Stampeders and Calgary and Edmonton, Alberta. The 1950 playoff marked the 42nd time that the Allan Cup has been awarded.

The CAHA faced issues with the professional-style operation of its top-level senior teams during the 1950 Allan Cup playoffs. Conn Smythe threatened that the Toronto Marlboros senior team would not continue the playoffs unless the CAHA guaranteed the team against financial losses for travel to the finals in Calgary, and claimed that it cost C$2,000 per week to keep the team operational. Although the CAHA offered to pay tourist-class train tickets, the Marlboros insisted they travelled only by first-class accommodations. The London Free Press sports editor Jack Park, wrote that Smythe did not appreciate the prestige of winning the Allan Cup, and that the CAHA was essentially sponsoring teams by covering travel expenses. Park speculated that amateur hockey might be fading away, and that teams in larger cities would rather operate openly as professional to have more control over player salaries due to the competition for talent.

== Teams ==
- Toronto Marlboros (Eastern Canadian Champions)
- Calgary Stampeders (Western Canadian Champions)

== Playdowns ==
=== Allan Cup Best-of-Seven Series ===
Toronto Marlboros defeated Calgary Stampeders 4-games-to-1

Toronto Marlboros 6 - Calgary Stampeders 5
Calgary Stampeders 5 - Toronto Marlboros 4
Toronto Marlboros 4 - Calgary Stampeders 1
Toronto Marlboros 3 - Calgary Stampeders 1
Toronto Marlboros 9 - Calgary Stampeders 5

=== Eastern Playdowns ===
Quarter-final

Toronto Marlboros defeated Sault Ste. Marie Greyhounds 2-games-to-none

Toronto Marlboros 10 - Sault Ste. Marie Greyhounds 4
Toronto Marlboros 13 - Sault Ste. Marie Greyhounds 0

Semi-final

Toronto Marlboros defeated Cornwall Calumets 4-games-to-none

Toronto Marlboros 7 - Cornwall Calumets 1
Toronto Marlboros 12 - Cornwall Calumets 2
Toronto Marlboros 8 - Cornwall Calumets 4
Toronto Marlboros 13 - Cornwall Calumets 1

Sherbrooke Saints defeated Sydney Millionaires 4-games-to-none

Sherbrooke Saints 4 - Sydney Millionaires 2
Sherbrooke Saints 4 - Sydney Millionaires 2
Sherbrooke Saints 5 - Sydney Millionaires 3
Sherbrooke Saints 5 - Sydney Millionaires 0

Final

Toronto Marlboros defeated Sherbrooke Saints 4-games-to-2

Toronto Marlboros 7 - Sherbrooke Saints 4
Toronto Marlboros 3 - Sherbrooke Saints 1
Toronto Marlboros 11 - Sherbrooke Saints 3
Sherbrooke Saints 6 - Toronto Marlboros 5
Sherbrooke Saints 5 - Toronto Marlboros 2
Toronto Marlboros 3 - Sherbrooke Saints 1

=== Western Playdowns ===
Semi-final

Calgary Stampeders defeated Kamloops Elks 4-games-to-1

Kamloops Elks 6 - Calgary Stampeders 1
Calgary Stampeders 5 - Kamloops Elks 3
Calgary Stampeders 5 - Kamloops Elks 2
Calgary Stampeders 3 - Kamloops Elks 2
Calgary Stampeders 6 - Kamloops Elks 3

Fort Frances Canadians defeated Emerson Canadians 3-games-to-2

Emerson Canadians 4 - Fort Frances Canadians 3
Fort Frances Canadians 9 - Emerson Canadians 4
Fort Frances Canadians 6 - Emerson Canadians 0
Emerson Canadians 4 - Fort Frances Canadians 3
Fort Frances Canadians 8 - Emerson Canadians 3

Final

Calgary Stampeders defeated Fort Frances Canadians 4-games-to-1

Calgary Stampeders 11 - Fort Frances Canadians 0
Fort Frances Canadians 3 - Calgary Stampeders 2
Calgary Stampeders 9 - Fort Frances Canadians 1
Calgary Stampeders 5 - Fort Frances Canadians 2
Calgary Stampeders 4 - Fort Frances Canadians 3
