= 1948 Allan Cup =

Canadian senior ice hockey championship

The Allan Cup trophy

The 1948 Allan Cup was the Canadian senior ice hockey championship for the 1947–48 season.

== Final ==
Best of 7

- Edmonton 6 Ottawa 2
- Ottawa 3 Edmonton 2
- Edmonton 7 Ottawa 0
- Edmonton 5 Ottawa 3
- Edmonton 5 Ottawa 3

Edmonton Flyers beat Ottawa Senators 4–1 on series.

== Team rosters ==
=== Edmonton Flyers ===
Coach Frank Currie

Al Rollins

Doug Anderson

Black

Andy Clovechok

Kreller

MacPherson

Billy Maher

Bing Merluk

Pringle

Rimstad

Freddy Smitten

Gordie Watt (captain)

Pug Young

=== Ottawa Senators ===
Coach George Boucher

Bill Fraser

Lude Check

Copp

Eddie Emberg

George Greene

Jake Irvine

Mather

Regan

Alec Smart

Smith

Stahan

Ray Trainor

Tudin
