= 1961–62 WHL season =

- League: Western Hockey League
- Sport: Ice hockey
- Games: 70
- Teams: 8

Regular season

President's Cup
- Champions: Edmonton Flyers
- Runners-up: Spokane Comets

Seasons
- 1960–61 1962–63

The 1961–62 WHL season was the tenth season of the Western Hockey League. The Edmonton Flyers were the President's Cup champions as they beat the Spokane Comets in seven games in the final series.

== Teams ==
1961–62 Western Hockey League
Division	Team	City	Arena	Capacity
Northern	Calgary Stampeders	Calgary, Alberta	Stampede Corral	6,475
Northern	Edmonton Flyers	Edmonton, Alberta	Edmonton Stock Pavilion	6,000
Northern	Seattle Totems	Seattle, Washington	Civic Ice Arena	5,000
Northern	Vancouver Canucks	Vancouver, British Columbia	PNE Forum	5,050
Southern	Los Angeles Blades	Los Angeles, California	Los Angeles Sports Arena	14,546
Southern	Portland Buckaroos	Portland, Oregon	Memorial Coliseum	12,000
Southern	San Francisco Seals	San Francisco, California	Cow Palace	11,089
Southern	Spokane Comets	Spokane, Washington	Spokane Coliseum	5,400

=== Map of teams ===
Northern Division Southern Division

== Final standings ==
Northern Division Standings
R	Team	GP	W	L	T	GF	GA	Pts
**1**	**Edmonton Flyers**	**70**	**39**	**27**	**4**	**296**	**245**	**82**
**2**	**Seattle Totems**	**70**	**36**	**29**	**5**	**244**	**222**	**77**
**3**	**Calgary Stampeders**	**70**	**36**	**29**	**5**	**292**	**271**	**77**
4	Vancouver Canucks	70	18	48	4	223	324	40

Southern Division Standings
R	Team	GP	W	L	T	GF	GA	Pts
**1**	**Portland Buckaroos**	**70**	**42**	**23**	**5**	**265**	**203**	**89**
**2**	**Spokane Comets**	**70**	**37**	**28**	**5**	**272**	**242**	**79**
**3**	**San Francisco Seals**	**70**	**29**	**39**	**2**	**229**	**270**	**60**
4	Los Angeles Blades	70	25	39	6	265	309	56

bold - qualified for playoffs

== Playoffs ==
The Edmonton Flyers win the President's Cup 4 games to 3.
