= Western Canada Senior Hockey League =

Defunct senior men's ice hockey league in Albert and Saskatchewan

- Classification: Senior
- Sport: Ice hockey
- Founded: 1945
- Founder: W. G. Hardy
- Folded: 1951
- Country: Canada
- Region: Alberta and Saskatchewan
- Most titles: Calgary Stampeders (3)

The Western Canada Senior Hockey League was a senior ice hockey league that played six seasons in Alberta and Saskatchewan, from 1945 to 1951. The league produced the 1946 Allan Cup and the 1948 Allan Cup champions, and merged into the Pacific Coast Hockey League for the 1951–52 season.

== History ==
In April 1945, W. G. Hardy sought to organize a senior hockey league including teams from Alberta and Saskatchewan. The result was the Western Canada Senior Hockey League (WCSHL) which began in the 1945–46 season, with Hardy as a league governor. The first season had teams in Edmonton, Calgary, Saskatoon and Regina. A fifth team was added in Lethbridge in the 1946–47 season.

The league produced the 1946 Allan Cup champion Calgary Stampeders, and the 1948 Allan Cup champion Edmonton Flyers. Hardy had nominated the Flyers to represent Canada at the 1947 Ice Hockey World Championships, but the Canadian Amateur Hockey Association ultimately did not to send a team due to funding issues.

D. P. McDonald of Calgary served as the league president from 1945 to 1950, until he was succeeded by Al Pickard in September 1950. He expected the WCSHL to be part of the Major Series for senior hockey which was proposed as a new Canadian playoffs structure at a higher calibre of competition than the Allan Cup. The Alexander Cup was established as the championship trophy of the Major Series, donated by Viscount Alexander, the Governor General of Canada at the time.

The league established the Dave Dryburgh Memorial Trophy in 1948, awarded to the top goaltender during the regular season.

The WCHSL wanted to expand to six teams for the 1951–52 season, and Pickard followed up on interest in Moose Jaw and Winnipeg. The CAHA required that all leagues in the Major Series post a $5,000 performance bond and guarantee its winner to participate in the national playoffs. The Regina Capitals submitted notice of financial issues and likelihood of folding. The remaining teams chose to become professional and the WCSHL merged into the Pacific Coast Hockey League for the 1951–52 season.

== Teams ==
- Calgary Stampeders (1945–51)
- Edmonton Flyers (1945–51)
- Lethbridge Maple Leafs (1946–49)
- Regina Capitals (1945–51)
- Saskatoon Elks (1945–47)
- Saskatoon Quakers (1947–51)

== Champions ==
- 1945–46 – Calgary Stampeders (1946 Allan Cup champion)
- 1946–47 – Calgary Stampeders
- 1947–48 – Edmonton Flyers (1948 Allan Cup champion)
- 1948–49 – Regina Capitals
- 1949–50 – Calgary Stampeders
- 1950–51 – Saskatoon Quakers
