= 1956–57 WHL season =

- League: Western Hockey League
- Sport: Ice hockey
- Games: 70
- Teams: 8

Regular season

President's Cup
- Champions: Brandon Regals
- Runners-up: New Westminster Royals

Seasons
- 1955–56 1957–58

The 1956–57 WHL season was the fifth season of the Western Hockey League. The Brandon Regals were the President's Cup champions as they beat the New Westminster Royals in four games in the final series.

== Teams ==
1956–57 Western Hockey League
Division	Team	City	Arena	Capacity
Coast	New Westminster Royals	New Westminster, British Columbia	Queen's Park Arena	3,500
Coast	Seattle Americans	Seattle, Washington	Civic Ice Arena	5,000
Coast	Vancouver Canucks	Vancouver, British Columbia	PNE Forum	5,050
Coast	Victoria Cougars	Victoria, British Columbia	Victoria Memorial Arena	5,000
Prairie	Brandon Regals	Brandon, Manitoba	Wheat City Arena	5,100
Prairie	Calgary Stampeders	Calgary, Alberta	Stampede Corral	6,475
Prairie	Edmonton Flyers	Edmonton, Alberta	Edmonton Stock Pavilion	6,000
Prairie	Winnipeg Warriors	Winnipeg, Manitoba	Winnipeg Arena	9,500

=== Map of teams ===
Coast Division Teams Prairie Division Teams

== Final standings ==
Coast Division Standings
R	Team	GP	W	L	T	GF	GA	Pts
**1**	**Seattle Americans**	**70**	**36**	**28**	**6**	**263**	**225**	**78**
**2**	**New Westminster Royals**	**70**	**34**	**31**	**5**	**215**	**235**	**73**
**3**	**Victoria Cougars**	**70**	**29**	**34**	**7**	**208**	**204**	**65**
4	Vancouver Canucks	70	27	37	6	203	231	60

Prairie Division Standings
R	Team	GP	W	L	T	GF	GA	Pts
**1**	**Brandon Regals**	**70**	**44**	**22**	**4**	**250**	**186**	**92**
**2**	**Edmonton Flyers**	**70**	**39**	**27**	**4**	**239**	**212**	**82**
**3**	**Calgary Stampeders**	**70**	**29**	**37**	**4**	**220**	**230**	**62**
4	Winnipeg Warriors	70	23	45	2	198	273	48

bold - qualified for playoffs

== Playoffs ==
Quarterfinals
C2	**New Westminster Royals**	**2**
C3	Victoria Cougars	1
P2	**Edmonton Flyers**	**2**
P3	Calgary Stampeders	1

Semifinals
C1	Seattle Americans	2
C2	**New Westminster Royals**	**4**
P1	**Brandon Regals**	**4**
P2	Edmonton Flyers	1

Finals
C2	New Westminster Royals	0
P1	**Brandon Regals**	4

The Brandon Regals win the President's Cup 4 games to 0.
