= Victoria Cougars (1949–1961) =

- City: Victoria, British Columbia
- League: Pacific Coast Hockey League; Western Hockey League
- Founded: 1949
- Operated: 1949–61

The Victoria Cougars were a minor professional ice hockey team based in Victoria, British Columbia. They played in the Pacific Coast Hockey League from 1949 to 1952, and they played in the Western Hockey League from 1952 to 1961.
