= Calgary Stampeders (ice hockey) =

Ice hockey team in Alberta, Canada (1938–1972)

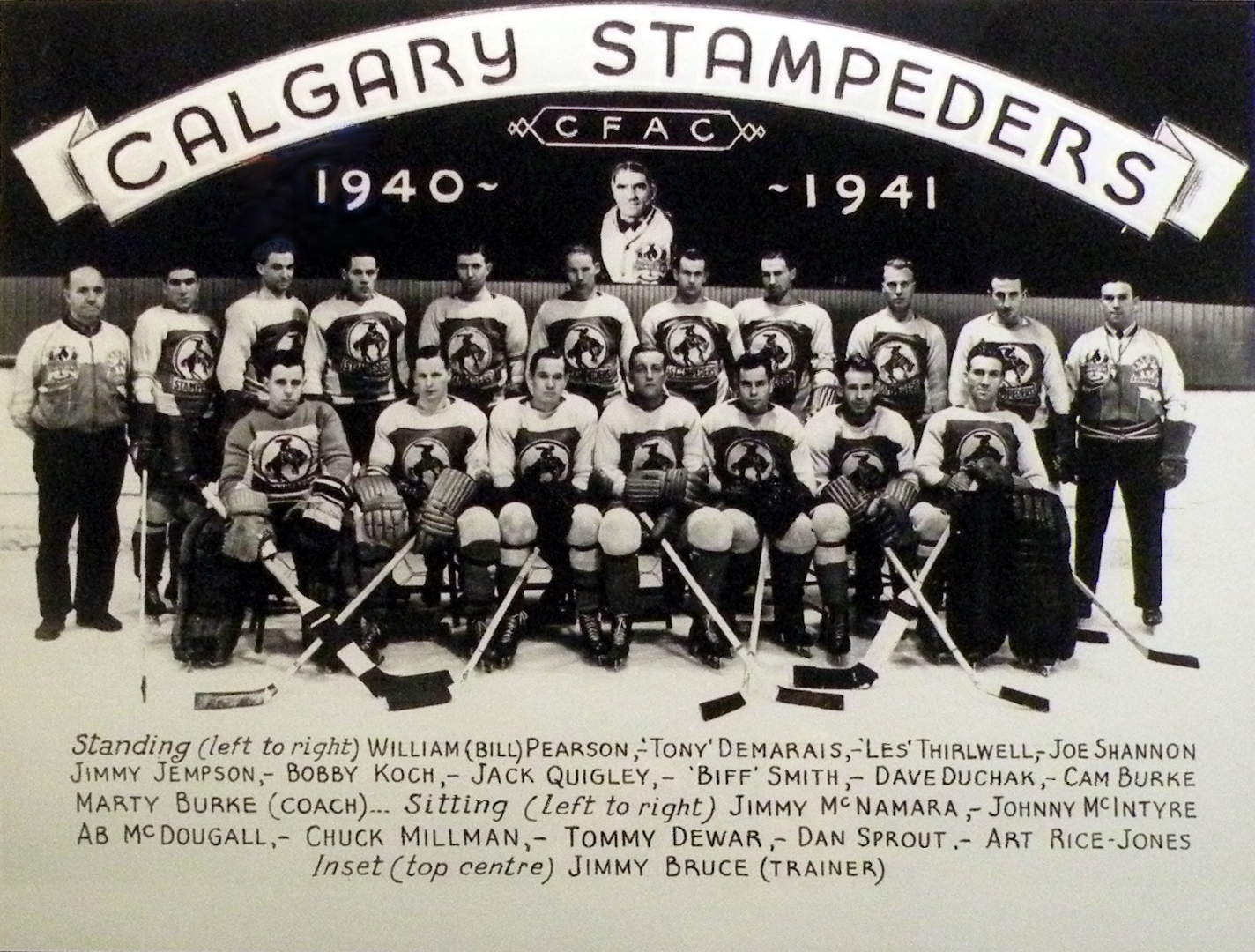
- 1940–41 Calgary Stampeders
- Sport: Ice hockey
- Founded: 1938
- Folded: 1972
- League: WIHL (1978–79); PHL (1971–72); ASHL (1938–42, 1968–71); WHL (1952–63); PCHL (1951–52); WCSHL (1945–51)
- Location: Calgary, Alberta, Canada
- Chairman: Gordon Love (1963)
- Affiliation: Chicago Black Hawks
- Championships: 1
- League titles: 2

The Calgary Stampeders were a defunct ice hockey team that was based in Calgary, Alberta, Canada. The team existed from 1938 until 1972, playing in various senior amateur and minor professional leagues during that time. In 1946, the Stampeders captured the Allan Cup as Canadian senior hockey champions, the first Alberta based club to do so.

A team of this same name also played the 1978–79 season in the Western International Hockey League.

== History ==
=== Senior hockey ===
The 1945–46 Stampeders were a powerhouse in the Western Canada Senior Hockey League (WCSHL). Led by Ken "Red" Hunter's then senior-amateur record 81 points, the Stamps finished first overall in the WCSHL with a 28–7–1 record, earning a bye into the league championship where they quickly dispatched the Edmonton Flyers four games to one. The Stamps then faced the Winnipeg Orioles for the Prairie championship. While Winnipeg's coach predicted his team would sweep Calgary in three games, it was instead the Stampeders who eliminated Winnipeg in three by scores of 5–1, 10–2 and 8–2. In the Western Canada final, the Stampeders once again easily handled their opponents, this time, the Trail Smoke Eaters. After tying the first two games, Calgary won the next two by 7–3 and 4–2 scores to reach the Allan Cup final against the Hamilton Tigers.

The series almost never happened, with the tournament scheduled to be held out west. The Hamilton players considered forgoing the Allan Cup final because the $6 per day they were offered for the trip was not enough to be able to take time off from their jobs. The Tigers did make the trip, but they were easily dispatched by the Calgary Stampeders in five games only winning the fifth game by a 1–0 score in Edmonton before a crowd of 6,000.

In 1946–47, the Stampeders once again reached the Allan Cup final. They were defeated, however, by the Montreal Royals. The deciding game was held in Quebec City in front of over 11,000 spectators.

As occurred frequently with senior hockey, growing concerns were surfacing regarding the status of players, as many teams were using former professionals in violation of the rules laid out by the Allan Cup committee. Many teams, including the Stampeders, were facing pressure to declare whether they were professional or amateur teams.

=== Professional hockey ===
Before the start of the 1951–52 season, the Stampeders, along with their provincial cousins, the Edmonton Flyers, officially turned professional, joining the Pacific Coast Hockey League, which was renamed the Western Hockey League (WHL) by the 1952–53 season. The WHL was the top professional league in Western Canada and the United States. The Stampeders became the minor-league affiliate of the Chicago Black Hawks.

The Stampeders quickly found success in the minor-pro ranks, winning the WHL title in 1953–54, defeating the Vancouver Canucks four games to one. The Stampeders then went on to face the Quebec Aces of the Quebec Hockey League in the Edinburgh Trophy for the championship of Canadian minor professional hockey. Calgary won the best-of-nine series in six games, with the clinching game held in Calgary, a 4–2 victory in front of 6,500 fans.

The Stampeders would reach the WHL final three more times: in 1955, falling to the Flyers in a four-game sweep; in 1958, when they fell to the Canucks; and in 1959, falling to the Victoria Cougars. During this time, The Stampeders were one of the top draws in the league. Including all playoff games, the 1953–54 Stampeders drew over 300,000 fans in a city of 150,000. In 1955–56, Calgary drew 157,803 fans in the regular season, second only to the Winnipeg Warriors.

In 1963, disenchanted with their affiliation with the Chicago Black Hawks, the Stampeders took a one-year leave of absence. Gordon Love, chairman of the Calgary Stampede Board, owners of the Stampeders, stated: "We have been treated so shabbily by Chicago, that we have no alternative... Tommy Ivan simply wasn't interested in the future of hockey in Calgary, and that's all there is to it." The Stampeders had also lost $90,000 during the season. Isolated in what was now a mostly Pacific coast league, Edmonton suspended operations along with Calgary. Neither team would ever resume operations, as the Flyers decided they could not be financially stable in the old Edmonton Gardens, and Calgary could not go it alone without an Edmonton team.

=== Revivals ===
The Calgary Stampeders name was revived for teams playing amateur senior hockey in later years: three seasons in the Alberta Senior Hockey League, one season in the Prairie Hockey League, and one season in the Western International Hockey League.

== League membership ==
The Stampeders played in the following leagues:

- 1938–42: Alberta Senior Hockey League (amateur)
- 1942–45: Did not operate (World War II)
- 1945–51: Western Canada Senior Hockey League (amateur)
- 1951–52: Pacific Coast Hockey League (minor pro)
- 1952–63: Western Hockey League (minor pro)
- 1968–71: Alberta Senior Hockey League (amateur)
- 1971–72: Prairie Hockey League (amateur)
- 1978–79: Western International Hockey League (amateur)

== Season-by-season record ==
Note: GP = Games played, W = Wins, L = Losses, T = Ties Pts = Points, GF = Goals for, GA = Goals against

Season	League	GP	W	L	T	GF	GA	Points	Finish	Playoffs
1938–39	ASHL	32	6	21	5	81	113	17	7th Overall	Out of playoffs
1939–40	ASHL	—	—	—	—	—	—	—		
1940–41	ASHL	30	17	13	0	119	90	34		
1941–42	ABCSL	32	22	6	4	154	97	48		
1945–46	WCSHL	36	28	7	1	219	95	57	1st Overall	Won league and Allan Cup
1946–47	WCSHL	40	27	9	4	187	105	58	1st Overall	Won league
1947–48	WCSHL	48	28	19	1	225	191	57	1st Overall	Lost final
1948–49	WCSHL	48	23	22	3	220	177	49	3rd Overall	
1949–50	WCSHL	50	22	23	5	176	163	49	2nd Overall	Won league
1950–51	WCSHL	60	38	21	1	282	202	77	1st Overall	
1951–52	PCHL	70	24	37	9	278	320	57	7th Overall	
1952–53	WHL	70	31	27	12	254	252	74	3rd Overall	
1953–54	WHL	70	38	25	7	266	206	84	2nd Overall	Won championship
1954–55	WHL	70	29	29	12	262	258	70	4th Overall	Lost final
1955–56	WHL	70	40	30	0	292	242	80	2nd Prairie	
1956–57	WHL	70	29	37	4	220	230	62	3rd Prairie	
1957–58	WHL	70	30	35	5	222	223	65	3rd Prairie	Lost final
1958–59	WHL	64	42	21	1	263	196	85	1st Prairie	Lost final
1959–60	WHL	70	32	36	2	245	227	66	5th Overall	
1960–61	WHL	70	44	22	4	300	215	92	1st Overall	
1961–62	WHL	70	36	29	5	292	271	77	T-2 North	Lost final
1962–63	WHL	70	23	45	2	227	284	48	4th North	Out of playoffs
1968–69	ASHL	—	—	—	—	—	—	—		
1969–70	ASHL	38	30	8	0	—	—	60		
1970–71	ASHL	48	28	17	3	224	163	59		
1971–72	PrHL	28	14	13	1	96	91	29		
1978–79	WIHL	25	12	11	2	117	112	26		

== NHL alumni ==
Partially as a result of their affiliation with the Black Hawks, 84 former Stampeders would also play in the National Hockey League.

- Red Almas
- Hub Anslow
- Frank Ashworth
- Doug Barkley
- Ray Barry
- Hank Bassen
- Garry Bauman
- Steve Black
- Hank Blade
- Chuck Blair
- Dusty Blair
- Gilles Boisvert
- George Boothman
- Harold Brown
- Bill Burega
- Dick Butler
- Don Campbell
- Hugh Coflin
- Gerry Couture
- Hugh Currie
- Claude Cyr
- Bunny Dame
- Tom Dewar
- Ernie Dickens
- Eddie Dorohoy
- Marv Edwards
- Roy Edwards
- Aut Erickson
- Sid Finney
- Joe Fisher
- Lee Fogolin Sr.
- Ray Frederick
- Howie Glover
- Terry Gray
- Bill Hay
- Jack Hendrickson
- Fred Hergerts
- Wally Hergesheimer
- Wayne Hicks
- Cec Hoekstra
- Fred Hucul
- Ron Huston
- Lou Jankowski
- Norm Johnson
- Eddie Joyal
- Bing Juckes
- Alex Kaleta
- Merv Kuryluk
- Gus Kyle
- Norm Larson
- Joe Levandoski
- Pat Lundy
- Milan Marcetta
- George McAvoy
- Butch McDonald
- Jim McFadden
- John McKenzie
- Jackie McLeod
- Art Michaluk
- John Michaluk
- Larry Mickey
- Jack Miller
- Bill Moe
- Randy Murray
- George Pargeter
- Claude Pronovost
- Max Quackenbush
- Billy Reay
- Gord Redahl
- Dennis Riggin
- Al Rollins
- Fred Sasakamoose
- Cliff Schmaultz
- Enio Sclisizzi
- Gary Simmons
- Peter Slobodian
- Doug Stevenson
- Ken Stewart
- Cy Thomas
- Ed Van Impe
- Don Ward
- Arch Wilder
- Bob Wilson
- Steve Witiuk

== See also ==
- Alberta-British Columbia Senior League
- Ice hockey in Calgary
- List of ice hockey teams in Alberta
