= 1957–58 WHL season =

- League: Western Hockey League
- Sport: Ice hockey
- Number of games: 70
- Number of teams: 8

Regular season

President's Cup
- Champions: Vancouver Canucks
- Runners-up: Calgary Stampeders

Seasons
- ← 1956–57 1958–59 →

The 1957–58 WHL season was the sixth season of the Western Hockey League. The Vancouver Canucks were the President's Cup champions as they beat the Calgary Stampeders in four games in the final series.

== Teams ==
1957–58 Western Hockey League
| Division | Team | City | Arena | Capacity |
| Coast | New Westminster Royals | New Westminster, British Columbia | Queen's Park Arena | 3,500 |
| Coast | Seattle Americans | Seattle, Washington | Civic Ice Arena | 5,000 |
| Coast | Vancouver Canucks | Vancouver, British Columbia | PNE Forum | 5,050 |
| Coast | Victoria Cougars | Victoria, British Columbia | Victoria Memorial Arena | 5,000 |
| Prairie | Calgary Stampeders | Calgary, Alberta | Stampede Corral | 6,475 |
| Prairie | Edmonton Flyers | Edmonton, Alberta | Edmonton Stock Pavilion | 6,000 |
| Prairie | Saskatoon/St. Paul Regals | Saskatoon, Saskatchewan; St. Paul, Minnesota | Saskatoon Arena; St. Paul Auditorium | 3,304; 5,000 |
| Prairie | Winnipeg Warriors | Winnipeg, Manitoba | Winnipeg Arena | 9,500 |

=== Map of teams ===
Coast Division Teams Prairie Division Teams

== Final standings ==
Coast Division Standings
| R | Team | GP | W | L | T | GF | GA | Pts |
|---|---|---|---|---|---|---|---|---|
| **1** | **Vancouver Canucks** | **70** | **44** | **21** | **5** | **238** | **174** | **93** |
| **2** | **New Westminster Royals** | **70** | **39** | **28** | **3** | **254** | **224** | **81** |
| **3** | **Seattle Americans** | **70** | **32** | **32** | **6** | **244** | **231** | **70** |
| 4 | Victoria Cougars | 70 | 18 | 50 | 2 | 226 | 313 | 38 |

Prairie Division Standings
| R | Team | GP | W | L | T | GF | GA | Pts |
|---|---|---|---|---|---|---|---|---|
| **1** | **Winnipeg Warriors** | **70** | **39** | **26** | **5** | **262** | **211** | **83** |
| **2** | **Edmonton Flyers** | **70** | **38** | **28** | **4** | **264** | **225** | **80** |
| **3** | **Calgary Stampeders** | **70** | **30** | **35** | **5** | **222** | **223** | **65** |
| 4 | Saskatoon Regals/Saint Paul Saints | 70 | 25 | 45 | 0 | 214 | 323 | 50 |

bold - qualified for playoffs

== Playoffs ==
Quarterfinals
C1 | **Vancouver Canucks** | **4**
P1 | Winnipeg Warriors | 3
C2 | New Westminster Royals | 1
C3 | **Seattle Americans** | **3**
P2 | Edmonton Flyers | 2
P3 | **Calgary Stampeders** | **3**

Semifinals
P1 | Vancouver Canucks
bye
C3 | Seattle Americans | 2
P3 | **Calgary Stampeders** | **3**

Finals
P1 | **Vancouver Canucks** | **4**
P3 | Calgary Stampeders | 0

The Vancouver Canucks win the President's Cup 4 games to 0.
