= Vancouver Forum =

Indoor arena in Vancouver, British Columbia, Canada

Coordinates: 49.28232°N 123.04304°W

PNE Forum
- Exhibition Forum, PNE Forum
- Interactive map of PNE Forum
- Location: North Renfrew Street, Vancouver, British Columbia V5K 3N7
- Owner: City of Vancouver
- Operator: City of Vancouver
- Capacity: Ice hockey: 5,050 until 1980; Concerts: 3,900

Construction
- Groundbreaking: 1930
- Opened: 1931
- Renovated: 1943 by the Royal Canadian Army; est. 1980's to an exhibition facility.

Tenants
- Vancouver Canucks (PCHL) (1945–1951) Vancouver Canucks (WHL) (1952-1968); Vancouver Burrards (WLA) (1938–1949) Vancouver Skating Club and the Connaught Skating Club also shared both ice surfaces with the hockey teams. Beginning in the late '50s, the VSC named the Forum its home rink until moving to the Agrodome in 1980. The 1960 World Figure Skating Competition was hosted at the Forum as were other high level events in the skating world. Ice Capades and Ice Follies performed here as well.

The Forum (also known as the Exhibition Forum, Vancouver Forum and PNE Forum) is an indoor arena in Vancouver, British Columbia, Canada located on the grounds of the Pacific National Exhibition.

== Sports, Ice Hockey and the Canucks ==
The building became Vancouver's premier indoor sports facility in 1936 when the 10,500 seat Denman Arena burned to the ground and was not rebuilt. The arena had seating for 5,050 spectators for hockey and box lacrosse. Some of the other major spectator arenas in the area besides the Forum included the Kerrisdale Arena (Vancouver) and Queen's Park Arena (New Westminster).

The venue hosted the boxing events during the 1954 British Empire and Commonwealth Games.

It hosted the Pacific Coast Hockey League's and Western Hockey League's Vancouver Canucks from 1945 to 1968. In 1968 The WHL Canucks moved to the newly completed Pacific Coliseum which was located close by on the PNE grounds (the N.H.L. version of the Vancouver Canucks started play in 1970).

The Vancouver Burrards of the Intercity Lacrosse League later known as the Western Lacrosse Association played at the Forum from 1938 until 1949. The team left for Kerrisdale Arena for the 1950 season.

The building was refurbished as a concert and exhibition space in the early 1980s. The hockey boards were removed to create more floor space. Much of the hockey seating remains however along with one of the original press boxes which is still in place. The ice plant has since been removed from the building. The various ice activities that used to take place in the Forum are now held in the Agrodome which is also located on the P.N.E. grounds next to the Pacific Coliseum. The Agrodome had a new separate ice plant installed when the move took place but now shares one with the Pacific Coliseum after the renovations that took place in that facility for the 2010 Vancouver/Whistler Olympic Winter Games.

Roller Derby and Professional Wrestling have also been staged at the Forum at various times throughout its lifespan.

== Concerts ==
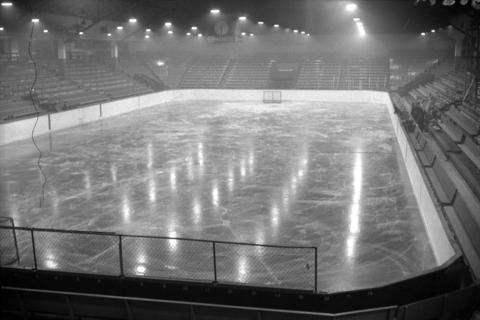
PNE Forum interior in 1943

It has hosted several concerts during its lifespan, before but mostly after the renovation.

Jimmy Durante played in the Forum during the 1930s. Bing Crosby on the invitation of Vancouver boxer Jimmy McLarnin played a fundraiser for the Sunset Memorial Centre. Crosby staged his radio show in September 1948 in front of a crowd of 9,000 which was a record for the facility.

The PNE says Pink Floyd played the Forum, although the band's online record indicate five concerts at the neighbouring and smaller PNE Gardens between 1968 and 1974. Musician Frank Zappa and his band, The Mothers of Invention played a concert on August 25, 1968. A recording of this concert was released in 2012, titled Road Tapes, Venue#1.

In the 1970s it hosted local acts like Prism in 1977 and Triumph in 1978.

1990s: On December 10, 1990, Jane's Addiction played the Forum with The Pixes and Primus the opening acts. On October 24, 1991 the Forum hosted Public Enemy and Anthrax, with Primus and Young Black Teenagers as the openers. Big Audio Dynamite shared a bill with Public Image Ltd, Live, and Blind Melon on March 30, 1992. Nirvana played two sold out show's there on January 3 and 4, 1994. In one of the more infamous rock media interviews, Nardwuar interviewed Kurt Cobain and Courtney Love in the Forum dressing room. Soundgarden and Tad on May 27, 1994. Tool with openers Cows on October 25 1996. Soundgarden, Rocket From the Crypt and Pond on December 7, 1996. Since the early 2000s, the venue has become popular with alternative and independent bands. Arcade Fire, Wolfmother, Portishead and the Arctic Monkeys are some of the bands who have played the venue since 2005.

There have been issues surrounding the staging of all ages concerts in recent years. In 2007, a 20-year-old man died in a mosh pit at a Smashing Pumpkins concert.

== Other uses ==
The Forum was also used as a rock venue for shooting of the movie Ladies and Gentlemen, The Fabulous Stains, a 1981 film about three teenage girls, played by Diane Lane, Laura Dern and Marin Kanter, who start a punk band.

The film also featured Ray Winstone, Christine Lahti, ex-Sex Pistols Steve Jones and Paul Cook, along with Paul Simonon from The Clash.

== 2010 Olympic Winter Games ==
It was the Uniform and Accreditation Centre Vancouver for the 2010 Winter Olympics and 2010 Winter Paralympics.

== See also ==
- List of Commonwealth Games venues

| Preceded by none | Home of the Vancouver Canucks (PCHL); 1945 – 1951 | Succeeded by PCHL franchise merged with Western Hockey League |
| Preceded by none | Home of the Vancouver Canucks (WHL); 1952 – 1968 | Succeeded by Pacific Coliseum |
| Preceded by none | Home of the Vancouver Burrards (WLA); 1938 – 1949 | Succeeded by Kerrisdale Arena |
