= Edmonton Gardens =

Indoor hockey arena built in Edmonton, Alberta, Canada

- The Cow Barn
- Interactive map of Edmonton Gardens
- Former names: Edmonton Stock Pavilion
- Location: SW corner of 118 Avenue & 73 Street, Edmonton, Alberta
- Coordinates: 53°34′10″N 113°27′26″W
- Owner: City of Edmonton
- Operator: Northlands
- Capacity: 5,200

Construction
- Groundbreaking: 1912
- Opened: December 13, 1913
- Renovated: 1947, 1963, 1966
- Demolished: February 1982
- Cost: C$163,827 Renovations: 1947: $329,156 ($5.25 million in 2025 dollars); 1963: $60,000 ($611,925 in 2025 dollars); 1966: $670,000 ($6.29 million in 2025 dollars)

Tenants
- Edmonton Drillers (NASL) 1980–81; Alberta/Edmonton Oilers (WHA) 1972–1974; Edmonton Oil Kings (WCJHL/CAHL) 1951–66 (CMJHL/WCHL) 1966–1974; Edmonton Flyers (ASHL/WCSHL) 1939–51, (PCHL) 1951–52, (WHL) 1952–63; Edmonton Eskimos 1913–1919, (Big Four) 1919–21, (WCHL/PHL) 1921–1927, (ASHL) 1938–39; Edmonton Dominions (ASHL) 1936–38

The Edmonton Gardens was the first indoor hockey arena built in Edmonton, Alberta, Canada. It was originally built as Edmonton Stock Pavilion in 1913, and held 5,200 spectators after its 1966 renovations.

It was home to the World Hockey Association's Edmonton Oilers from 1972 to 1974. The Oilers moved to the brand new Northlands Coliseum after the 1973–74 season. In addition to the Oilers, the Edmonton Oil Kings, Edmonton Eskimos hockey team, and Edmonton Flyers played their home games at Edmonton Gardens. It held a wide variety of events, including hockey, curling, basketball, boxing, figure skating, circuses, rodeos, bingo nights, car shows, conventions, horse shows, and bull sales.

== History ==
The arena was built at the fairgrounds in order to be away from the city, thus allowing it to also be used as a livestock pavilion, alongside the stables and horse race track. The opening ceremonies were held on Christmas Day 1913, exactly 19 years after Edmonton's first hockey game, featuring a hockey game between two Stanley Cup finalists, the Edmonton Eskimos and the Edmonton Dominions, which over 2,000 fans attended. Their previous arena, Thistle Rink, had just burnt down that year. The Dominion's forward Russell "Barney" Stanley would become a member of the Hockey Hall of Fame, and the arena would be home to other Stanley Cup finalist teams, Memorial Cup teams, and three Memorial Cups. It was the only home of the Edmonton Flyers (1939–51).

The Gardens got the nickname "The Cow Barn" from attendants emphasizing its use for agriculture exhibitions, in particular for livestock shows. It also was notorious for bad sight lines and uncomfortable seats. The girders, that were also in the way of spectators, dripped water onto the ice/play surface creating mounds during play. By the 1960s, it was often criticized as being a fire hazard. A $60,000 improvement in 1963 did little to improve its safety, leading to having seven Edmonton Fire Department firefighters stationed at each event. Media increasingly called it a dirty, obsolete, and rickety building, and an April 15, 1966 Edmonton Journal article called Edmonton Gardens "a disaster waiting to happen. The old house, with its obsolete lighting fixtures, oily wooden floors, and sordid washrooms, is an eyesore to hockey fans." The following month, the city fire chief condemned it, and ordered it closed as a fire hazard. That summer saw a $670,000 renovation that gutted the interior, and replaced the steel girders with 8-inch (200 mm) columns at 45°. The wooden bleachers were replaced with a fireproof concrete grandstand, and reduced the seating capacity to 5,200.

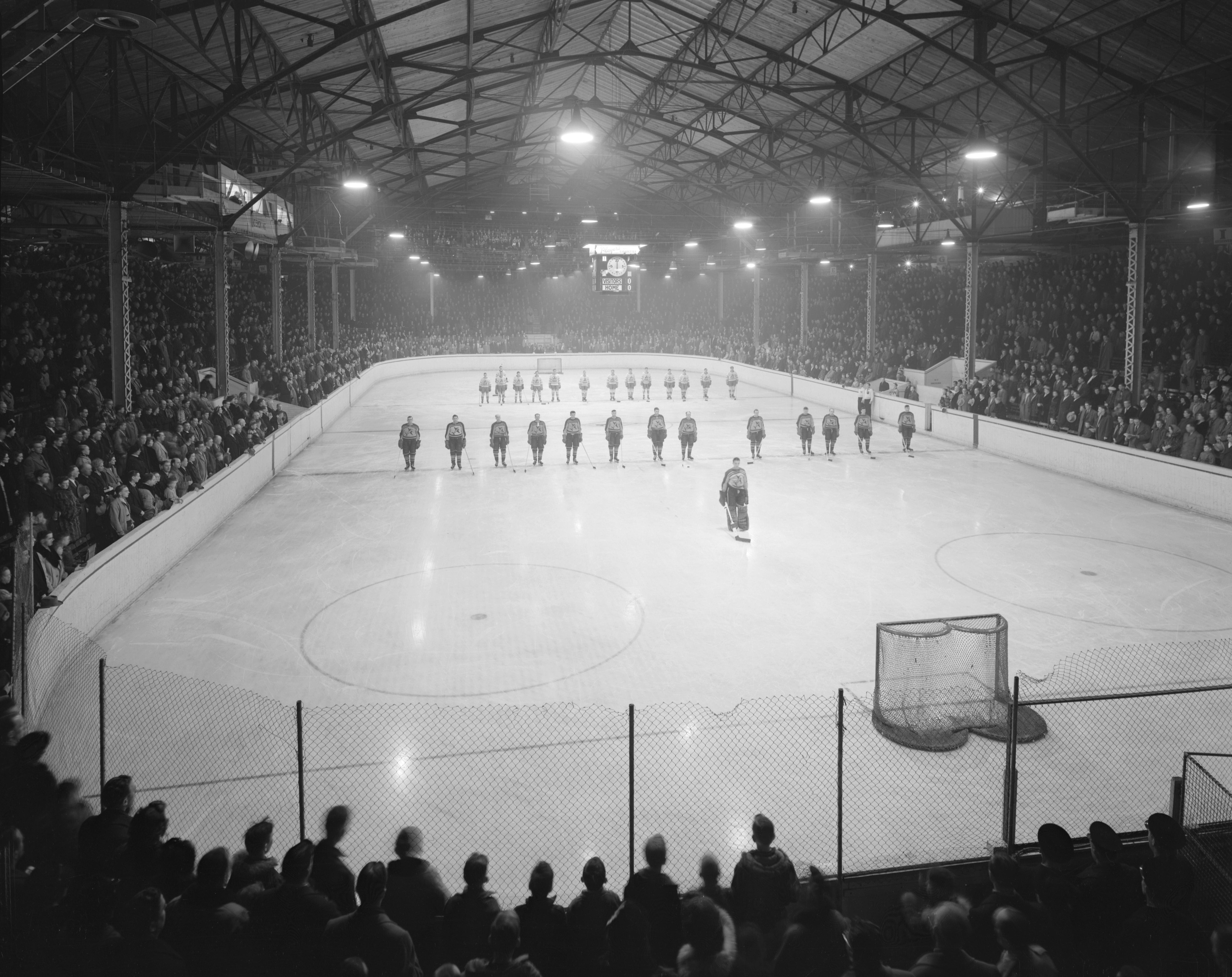
Edmonton Flyers hockey team at Edmonton Gardens in 1950

The Oilers and Oil Kings moved across 118 Avenue to Northlands Coliseum, in 1974.

The boxing events for the 1978 Commonwealth Games were held at Edmonton Gardens.

On March 2, 1981, game 1 of the 1981 NASL indoor finals was played at the Edmonton Gardens because the Northlands Coliseum was unavailable. In it the Edmonton Drillers defeated the Chicago Sting, 9–6, in front of 5,089 fans. The Drillers went onto sweep the finals, two games to none, five days later in Chicago.

Demolition of the Gardens began January 20, 1982, but quickly disproved the moniker "accident waiting to happen." "Firstly, they stuffed it with 50 kilograms of dynamite, then, they used a bulldozer, but still the grand old lady of Edmonton sports wouldn't budge," one story reported. "Gardens won't go boom," the headline read, recounting two days of the crew drilling holes into the walls and supports, and then cramming in 320 sticks of dynamite. An Edmonton Journal article on February 25, 1982, read "Gardens 2 TNT 0. A second try at demolishing what's left of the Edmonton Gardens ended with a wham, a puff of dust and peals of laughter. The building stood in mock defiance amid hoots of glee from the gallery (of onlookers)." Northlands Park elected to finish the demolition with a wrecking ball. Another arena, Hall D of the Edmonton Expo Centre, currently occupies the site.

First arena	Home of the Edmonton Oilers; 1972–1974	Succeeded by Northlands Coliseum
First arena	Home of the Edmonton Oil Kings (WCHL); 1966–1974	Succeeded by Northlands Coliseum
Preceded by Winnipeg Arena and Wheat City Arena	Host of odd year Memorial Cups; 1961, 1963, 1965	Succeeded by Fort William Gardens
Preceded by Thistle Rink	Home of the Edmonton Eskimos (WCHL); 1913–1927	Dissolved

== See also ==
- List of Commonwealth Games venues
