= Vancouver Canucks (WHL) =

- City: Vancouver, British Columbia
- League: WHL
- Founded: 1945
- Operated: 1945–70
- Home arena: PNE Forum; Pacific Coliseum
- Affiliates: Rochester Americans (AHL) (1968–1970)

Franchise history
- 1945–1952: Vancouver Canucks (PCHL)

Championships
- Playoff championships: 6 (1946, 1948, 1958, 1960,1969, 1970)

The Vancouver Canucks were a minor league professional ice hockey team in the Pacific Coast Hockey League and the Western Hockey League, based in Vancouver, British Columbia, Canada. Inaugurated in 1945 with the PCHL, they became a WHL team with the merger of the PCHL with the Western Canada Senior Hockey League in 1952. The Canucks played 25 seasons in the WHL between 1945 and 1970. They were replaced by an expansion National Hockey League franchise of the same name in 1970, joining that league with the expansion Buffalo Sabres.

The Vancouver Canucks won six President's/Lester Patrick Cups (the trophy was renamed in 1960 after the death of Lester Patrick), two PCHL titles (1946 and 1948) and four WHL titles (1958, 1960, 1969 and 1970). They were also regular season champions four times. They played home games in the PNE Forum arena at the Pacific National Exhibition in east Vancouver, before moving for their last two seasons into the Pacific Coliseum just to the north.

== Personnel ==
=== Players ===
Five Canucks players have been inducted into the Hockey Hall of Fame. Andy Bathgate (inducted in 1978) played with Vancouver for four years (1952–54 and 1968–70) and was on the team for their final two championships. In 1969–70, he recorded 108 points in 72 games, earning the George Leader Cup as league MVP. Johnny Bower, Tony Esposito, Allan Stanley and Gump Worsley – all Hall of Fame inductees – have all played one season with the Canucks.

=== Coaches ===
1948–49: Bill Cowley
1949–50: Bill Carse
1950–51: Bill Carse replaced by Murph Chamberlain
1951–52: Murph Chamberlain; replaced by Hugh Currie; replaced by Joe Carveth
1959–61: Art Chapman
1961–62: Phil Maloney (11–35–3); replaced by Hugh Currie (7–13–1) (February 7, 1962)
1962–63: Max McNab
1966–67: Bert Olmstead
1967–68: Jim Gregory
1968–69: Joe Crozier
1969–70: Joe Crozier; replaced by Hal Laycoe

=== General Managers ===
1948–49: Bill Cowley
1949–50: Coleman E. Hall
1950–51: –
1960–61: Coley Hall
1961–62: Art Chapman (temp); replaced by Dave Dauphine (after Nov.)
1962–63: Max McNab
1967–68: Annis Stukus
1968–69: Joe Crozier
1969–70: Joe Crozier; replaced by Bud Poile

=== Presidents ===
1948–61: Coleman E. Hall
1962–63: Fred J. Hume (owner)
1968–69: Cyrus McLean
1969–70: Cyrus McLean; replaced by Thomas K. Scallen

== Honoured members ==
=== Hall of famers ===
Players

- Andy Bathgate, C, 1952–54 & 1968–70, inducted 1978
- Johnny Bower, G, 1954–55, inducted 1976
- Tony Esposito, G, 1967–68, inducted 1988
- Allan Stanley, D, 1953–54, inducted 1981
- Gump Worsley, G, 1953–54, inducted 1980

=== WHL league award winners ===
Players

Leader Cup – MVP

- Emile Francis, G, 1952–53
- Lorne Worsley, G, 1953–54
- Phil Maloney, F, 1955–56
- Hank Bassen, G, 1959–60
- Phil Maloney, F, 1962–63
- Billy McNeill, F, 1964–65
- Billy McNeill, F, 1965–66
- Andy Bathgate, F, 1969–70

Rookie Award

- Orland Kurtenbach, D, 1957–58
- Bruce Gamble, G, 1958–59
- Jim Baird, G, 1961–62
- Gilles Villemure, G,
- Ron Boehm, F, 1966–67
- Brad Selwood, F, 1969–70

Most Gentlemanly Player – Fred J. Hume Cup

- Phil Maloney, F, 1961–62
- Phil Maloney, F, 1962–63
- Phil Maloney, F, 1967–68

Outstanding Defenceman – Hal Laycoe Cup

- Larry Cahan, D, 1966–67
- Marc Reaume, D, 1969–70

Leading Scorer Award

- Phil Maloney, F, 1955–56 (95 points)

Outstanding Goaltender Award

- Emile Francis, G, 1952–53 GA-216 GAA-3.08
- Lorne Worsley, G, 1953–54 GA-168 GAA-2.40
- Johnny Bower, G, 1954–55 GP-63 GA-171 GAA-2.71
- Ray Mikulan, G, 1955–56 GA-181 GAA-2.54
- Marcel Pelletier, G, 1957–58 GA-173 GAA-2.43
- Hank Bassen, G, 1959–60 GA-172 GAA-2.48
- George Gardner, G, 1969–70 GA-171 GAA-2.88

== Year by year standings ==
Presidents'/Lester Patrick Cup champions	Division/reg. season champions	League leader

Note: GP = Games played, W = Wins, L = Losses, T = Ties Pts = Points, GF = Goals for, GA = Goals against

Season	League	GP	W	L	T	Pts	GF	GA	Finish	Playoffs
1945–46	PCHL	64	37	27	0	74	308	247		Won championship
1946–47	PCHL	60	30	29	1	61	267	287		
1947–48	PCHL	66	34	29	3	71	284	264		Won championship
1948–49	PCHL	70	33	31	6	72	262	256	3rd North	
1949–50	PCHL	70	33	28	9	75	300	264	3rd North	
1950–51	PCHL	70	19	34	17	55	216	285	6th overall	
1951–52	PCHL	70	23	38	9	55	226	283	8th overall	
1952–53	WHL	70	32	28	10	74	222	216	2nd overall	
1953–54	WHL	70	39	24	7	85	218	174	1st overall	
1954–55	WHL	70	31	30	9	71	207	202	3rd overall	
1955–56	WHL	70	38	28	4	80	252	181	1st Coast	
1956–57	WHL	70	27	37	6	60	203	231	4th Coast	
1957–58	WHL	70	44	21	5	93	238	174	1st Coast	Won championship
1958–59	WHL	70	31	28	11	73	219	214	2nd Coast	
1959–60	WHL	70	44	20	6	94	230	177	1st overall	Won championship
1960–61	WHL	70	38	29	3	79	208	191	3rd overall	
1961–62	WHL	70	18	48	4	40	223	324	4th Northern	
1962–63	WHL	70	35	31	4	74	243	234	1st Northern	
1963–64	WHL	70	26	41	3	55	229	258	6th overall	
1964–65	WHL	70	32	32	6	70	263	244	3rd overall	
1965–66	WHL	72	33	35	4	70	252	233	3rd overall	
1966–67	WHL	72	38	32	2	78	228	215	3rd overall	
1967–68	WHL	72	26	41	5	57	213	258	5th overall	
1968–69	WHL	74	36	24	14	86	259	223	2nd overall	Won championship
1969–70	WHL	72	47	17	8	102	334	219	1st overall	Won championship
Season	League	GP	W	L	T	Pts	GF	GA	Finish	Playoffs

== Year by year statistical leaders ==
=== Total points (team, season) ===
Year	Player	GM	Goals	Assists	Points	PIM	Leading scorer
1952–53	Larry Popein	70	25	44	69	23	Ian MacIntosh, Walt Atanas – 28
1953–54	Larry Popein	70	34	32	66	22	Larry Popein
1954–55	Doug Adam	67	30	22	52	53	Doug Adam
1955–56	Phil Maloney	70	37	58	95	14	Phil Maloney
1956–57	Phil Maloney	70	43	55	98	8	Phil Maloney
1957–58	Phil Maloney	70	35	59	94	0	Jack McLeod – 44*
1958–59	Ted Hampson	66	27	41	68	23	Dan Belisle – 31
1959–60	Colin Kilburn	70	23	47	70	79	Jim Powers – 30
1960–61	Bruce Carmichael	70	30	47	77	36	Dan Belisle – 30
1961–62	Phil Maloney	70	34	52	86	2	Barrie Ross – 35
1962–63	Phil Maloney	69	24	61	90	8	Carl "Buddy" Boone – 44*
1963–64	Phil Maloney	65	28	53	81	38	Carl "Buddy" Boone – 38
1964–65	Billy McNeill	68	29	59	88	86	Phil Maloney – 29
1965–66	Billy McNeill	72	40	62	102	20	Billy McNeill
1966–67	Gordon Vejprava	71	36	46	82	27	Gordon Vejprava
1967–68	Phil Maloney	72	22	46	68	6	Bruce Carmichael – 31
1968–69	Bob Barlow	74	36	48	84	50	Andy Bathgate – 37
1969–70	Andy Bathgate	72	40	68*	108*	66	Paul Andrea – 44*

* – team record
 Team record for PIM/season   – 251, John Arbor, 1969–'70

=== Total points (team, playoffs) ===
Year        Player              GP   Goals  Assists  Pts   PIM
1952–'53    Larry Popein         9      5     10      15     0
1953–'54    Charles McCullough  13      5      8      13     0
1954–'55    Phil Maloney         5      2      2       4     0
1955–'56    Phil Maloney        15      8      7      15     4
1957–'58    Phil Maloney        11      8     17*     25*    4
1958–'59    (three players tied with 7 points in 9 games)
1959–'60    Ray Cyr             11      5     11      16    11
1960–'61    Bruce Carmichael     9      3      3       6     2
1962–'63    Phil Maloney         7      2      7       9     0
            Robert Kabel         7      5      4       9     2
1964–'65    Phil Maloney         5      1      5       6     0
            Billy McNeill        5      2      4       6     0
1965–'66    Larry Cahan          7      4     12      16     4
1966–'67    Bryan Hextall        8      3      5       8    11
1968–'69    Bryan Hextall        8      4      7      11    22
1969–'70    Murray Hall         11     10     11      21    10
            Gerry Glover        11      5     16      21    12
* – team record
Team record for goals/playoff – 14, Jack McLeod, 1957–'58
Team record for PIM/playoff   – 47, Ted McCaskill, 1969–'70

=== Goaltender stats, season ===
Year        Player                GP    GA  EN  SO  GAA    W   L   T   SVS   .PC
1952–'53    Emile Francis         70   216       5  3.09  32  28  10               – won Outstanding Goalkeeper
1953–'54    Lorne "Gump" Worsley  70   168       4  2.40  39  24   7               – won Outstanding Goalkeeper
1954–'55    Johnny Bower          63   171       7  2.71  30  25   8               – won Outstanding Goalkeeper
1955–'56    Ray Mikulan           71   181          2.54                           – won Outstanding Goalkeeper
1956–'57    Ray Mikulan           71   231   0   4  3.25               1772  .885
1957–'58    Marcel Pelletier      71   173   0   8* 2.43               1749  .910* – won Outstanding Goalkeeper
1958–'59    Bruce Gamble          65   199   2   7  3.06  29  26  20   1630  .891
1959–'60    Hank Bassen           69   172       5  2.45  44  19   6               – won Outstanding Goalkeeper
1960–'61    Claude Evans          53   147       6  2.77  27  23   3
1961–'62    Claude Evans          40   165       2  4.08  11  26   3
            Art LaRiviere         23
1962–'63    Gilles Villemure      70   228       5  3.26  35  31   4
1963–'64    Marcel Paille         70   254       2  3.60  26  41   3
1964–'65    Gilles Villemure      60   212       6  3.46  27  26   6
1965–'66    Gilles Villemure      69   223       5  3.20  32  34   3
1966–'67    Don Simmons           72   213   1   7  2.95  38  32   2
1967–'68    Tony Esposito         63   199   0   4  3.20  25  33   4   
            Jean-Guy Morissette   11    58   0   0  5.45   1   8   1
1968–'69    George Gardner        53   154   2   2  3.01  25  18   9
            Charlie Hodge         13    32   1   0  2.54   7   2   4
            Al Millar             12    34   0   0  3.52   4   4   1
1969–'70    George Gardner        60   171   0   3  2.88  41  14   6               – won Outstanding Goalkeeper
            Lynn Zimmerman        13    48   0   0  3.78
