= Edmonton Flyers =

Professional ice hockey team in Edmonton, Alberta (1940–1963)

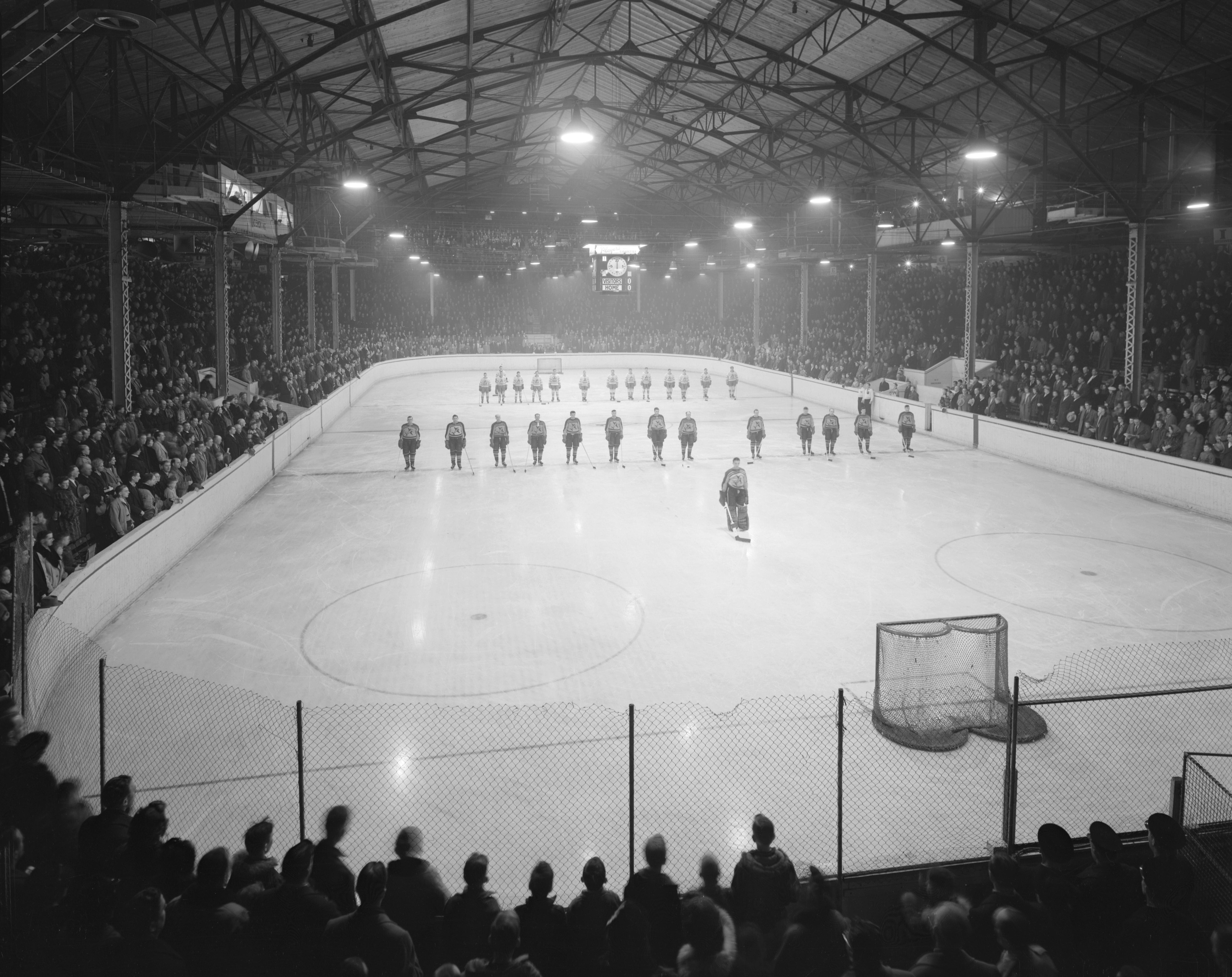
Edmonton Flyers at Edmonton Gardens (1950)

The Edmonton Flyers were an ice hockey team that was based in Edmonton, Alberta, Canada. The team existed from 1940 until 1963, first as an amateur senior ice hockey team (1940–1951), and then as a professional minor league team. The Flyers played in the Edmonton Gardens.

The Flyers were nominated by W. G. Hardy to represent Canada at the 1947 Ice Hockey World Championships, but the Canadian Amateur Hockey Association ultimately did not to send a team due to funding issues.

The Flyers won the 1948 Allan Cup as Canadian senior hockey champions. The Flyers later won three Lester Patrick Cups as Western Hockey League champions.

The Flyers were a minor league affiliate of the National Hockey League's Detroit Red Wings during their tenure in the WHL. During this time, many future NHL stars passed through the Flyers organization. Among them were Al Arbour, Johnny Bucyk, Glenn Hall, Bronco Horvath and Norm Ullman.

== Season-by-season record ==
The Flyers played in the following leagues:

- 1940-41: Alberta Senior Hockey League (amateur)
- 1941-45: Did not operate (World War II)
- 1945-51: Western Canada Senior Hockey League (amateur)
- 1951-52: Pacific Coast Hockey League (minor professional)
- 1952-63: Western Hockey League (minor professional)

Note: GP = Games played, W = Wins, L = Losses, T = Ties Pts = Points, GF = Goals for, GA = Goals against

Season	League	GP	W	L	T	GF	GA	Points	Finish	Playoffs
1940-41	ASHL	30	15	14	1	121	117	31		
1945-46	WCSHL	36	24	10	2	181	130	50	2nd Overall	
1946-47	WCSHL	40	??	??	?	174	139	46	2nd Overall	
1947-48	WCSHL	48	24	22	2	231	184	50	3rd Overall	Won league and Allan Cup
1948-49	WCSHL	48	30	17	1	262	172	61	2nd Overall	
1949-50	WCSHL	50	27	18	5	238	174	59	1st Overall	
1950-51	WCSHL	60	34	25	1	242	198	69	2nd Overall	
1951-52	PCHL	70	30	32	8	244	246	68	5th Overall	
1952-53	WHL	70	31	28	11	263	227	73	4th Overall	Won championship
1953-54	WHL	70	29	30	11	246	260	69	4th Overall	
1954-55	WHL	70	39	20	11	273	204	89	1st Overall	Won championship
1955-56	WHL	70	33	34	3	236	256	56	4th Prairie	
1956-57	WHL	70	39	27	4	239	212	82	2nd Prairie	
1957-58	WHL	70	38	28	4	264	225	80	2nd Prairie	
1958-59	WHL	64	33	28	3	205	206	69	2nd Prairie	
1959-60	WHL	70	37	29	4	246	240	78	4th Overall	
1960-61	WHL	70	27	43	0	229	295	54	7th Overall	
1961-62	WHL	70	39	27	4	296	245	82	1st North	Won championship
1962-63	WHL	70	24	44	2	215	309	50	3rd North	

== Notable alumni ==
List of Edmonton Flyers alumni who played more than 100 games in Edmonton and 100 or more games in the National Hockey League.

- Al Arbour
- Glenn Hall
- Jack Hendrickson
- Eddie Joyal
- Forbes Kennedy
- Tony Leswick
- Len Lunde
- Bud MacPherson
- Billy McNeill
- Gerry Melnyk
- John Miszuk
- Bud Poile
- Larry Zeidel

In 1955, John Utendale became the first Black player to sign a contract with an NHL team, the Detroit Red Wings. Utendale instead played with the Edmonton Flyers, as they were the Red Wings' minor league affiliate.

== See also ==
- List of ice hockey teams in Alberta
