= Bryan Lefley =

Canadian ice hockey player and coach

- Born: October 18, 1948 Grosse Isle, Manitoba, Canada
- Died: October 28, 1997 (aged 49) Bolzano, Italy
- Height: 6 ft 0 in (183 cm)
- Weight: 180 lb (82 kg; 12 st 12 lb)
- Position: Defence
- Shot: Left
- Played for: New York Islanders; Kansas City Scouts; Colorado Rockies
- NHL draft: Undrafted
- Playing career: 1969–1981

Bryan Andrew Lefley (October 18, 1948 – October 28, 1997) was a Canadian professional ice hockey player and coach. He played in 228 games in the National Hockey League between 1972 and 1978, and later played in Europe.

Lefley was born in Grosse Isle, Manitoba. After his playing days, he coached in Europe, notably coaching the Italy men's national ice hockey team from 1993 to 1997, until his death in a car accident on October 28, 1997, in Bolzano, Italy, ten days after his 49th birthday. Bryan was the brother of Chuck Lefley.

== Career statistics ==
=== Regular season and playoffs ===
			Regular season					Playoffs
Season	Team	League	GP	G	A	Pts	PIM	GP	G	A	Pts	PIM
1964–65	Winnipeg Rangers	MJHL	24	3	2	5	8	4	0	0	0	0
1965–66	Winnipeg Rangers	MJHL	14	1	1	2	10	9	0	2	2	12
1966–67	Winnipeg Rangers	MJHL	36	5	15	20	26	7	1	1	2	16
1967–68	Winnipeg Rangers	MJHL	—	—	—	—	—	—	—	—	—	—
1968–69	Nelson Maple Leafs	WIHL	—	—	—	—	—	—	—	—	—	—
1969–70	Omaha Knights	CHL	63	7	9	16	42	12	7	3	10	9
1970–71	Omaha Knights	CHL	67	8	25	33	111	10	0	3	3	2
1971–72	Omaha Knights	CHL	71	10	20	30	109	—	—	—	—	—
1972–73	New York Islanders	NHL	63	3	7	10	56	—	—	—	—	—
1973–74	New York Islanders	NHL	7	0	0	0	0	—	—	—	—	—
1973–74	Fort Worth Wings	CHL	58	8	36	44	88	5	0	1	1	6
1974–75	Baltimore Clippers	AHL	9	3	0	3	6	—	—	—	—	—
1974–75	Providence Reds	AHL	29	3	10	13	32	1	0	0	0	2
1974–75	Kansas City Scouts	NHL	29	0	3	3	6	—	—	—	—	—
1975–76	Springfield Indians	AHL	71	4	25	29	48	—	—	—	—	—
1976–77	Oklahoma City Blazers	CHL	8	2	3	5	4	—	—	—	—	—
1976–77	Colorado Rockies	NHL	58	0	6	6	27	—	—	—	—	—
1977–78	Colorado Rockies	NHL	71	4	13	17	12	2	0	0	0	0
1978–79	Düsseldorfer EG	GER	51	13	25	38	44	—	—	—	—	—
1979–80	Düsseldorfer EG	GER	45	13	23	36	36	—	—	—	—	—
1980–81	Düsseldorfer EG	GER	1	0	1	1	0	—	—	—	—	—
1980–81	SC Bern	SUI	28	7	20	27	26	—	—	—	—	—
1981–82	SC Bern	SUI	—	7	14	21	—	—	—	—	—	—
NHL totals			228	7	29	36	101	2	0	0	0	0
