= Rick Newell =

Canadian ice hockey player

- Born: February 18, 1948 (age 78) Winnipeg, Manitoba, Canada
- Height: 5 ft 11 in (180 cm)
- Weight: 180 lb (82 kg; 12 st 12 lb)
- Position: Defence
- Shot: Left
- Played for: Detroit Red Wings; Phoenix Roadrunners
- Playing career: 1969–1978

Gordon Richard Newell (born February 18, 1948) is a Canadian former professional ice hockey player who played seven games in the National Hockey League for the Detroit Red Wings and 25 games in the World Hockey Association for the Phoenix Roadrunners between 1972 and 1975. The rest of his career, which lasted from 1969 to 1978, was spent in various minor leagues.

== Career statistics ==
=== Regular season and playoffs ===
			Regular season					Playoffs
Season	Team	League	GP	G	A	Pts	PIM	GP	G	A	Pts	PIM
1964–65	Winnipeg Rangers	MJHL	35	5	13	18	74	5	1	8	9	15
1965–66	Winnipeg Rangers	MJHL	3	0	2	2	6	—	—	—	—	—
1966–67	University of Minnesota Duluth	WCHA	22	6	13	19	68	—	—	—	—	—
1967–68	University of Minnesota Duluth	WCHA	18	1	7	8	52	—	—	—	—	—
1968–69	University of Minnesota Duluth	WCHA	18	1	6	7	16	—	—	—	—	—
1969–70	University of Minnesota Duluth	WCHA	17	3	4	7	28	—	—	—	—	—
1969–70	Omaha Knights	CHL	6	0	0	0	4	—	—	—	—	—
1970–71	Omaha Knights	CHL	69	6	17	23	110	11	1	4	5	4
1970–71	Providence Reds	AHL	19	1	6	7	15	—	—	—	—	—
1971–72	Omaha Knights	CHL	53	8	21	29	76	—	—	—	—	—
1971–72	Phoenix Roadrunners	WHL	1	0	0	0	0	—	—	—	—	—
1971–72	Providence Reds	AHL	19	1	6	7	15	—	—	—	—	—
1972–73	Virginia Wings	AHL	68	24	23	47	125	9	2	3	5	6
1972–73	Detroit Red Wings	NHL	3	0	0	0	0	—	—	—	—	—
1973–74	Virginia Wings	AHL	50	9	22	31	44	—	—	—	—	—
1973–74	Detroit Red Wings	NHL	4	0	0	0	0	—	—	—	—	—
1973–74	London Lions	Intl	17	12	11	23	63	—	—	—	—	—
1974–75	Tulsa Oilers	CHL	22	5	9	14	24	—	—	—	—	—
1974–75	Phoenix Roadrunners	WHA	25	0	4	4	39	5	0	1	1	2
1975–76	Tucson Mavericks	CHL	57	9	23	32	104	—	—	—	—	—
1975–76	Syracuse Blazers	NAHL	6	1	3	4	0	—	—	—	—	—
1977–78	Phoenix Roadrunners	PHL	35	10	32	42	28	—	—	—	—	—
WHA totals			25	0	4	4	39	5	0	1	1	2
NHL totals			7	0	0	0	0	—	—	—	—	—
