= 1963–64 MJHL season =

Manitoba ice hockey season

The Brandon Wheat Kings won for the third year in a row, and fourth in five years. The win on March 8, 1964, in Fort Frances was the first time the Wheat Kings won the Turnbull Memorial Trophy not playing on home ice.

== League notes ==
The MJHL expands to Fort Frances, with the Fort Frances Royals joining the league.

== Regular season ==
League Standings	GP	W	L	T	Pts	GF	GA
Brandon Wheat Kings	30	27	1	2	56	209	67
Fort Frances Royals	30	17	12	1	35	118	136
Winnipeg Rangers	30	15	12	3	33	120	91
Winnipeg Monarchs	30	13	15	2	28	112	124
Winnipeg Braves	30	11	16	3	25	92	120
St. Boniface Canadiens	30	1	28	1	3	97	210

== All-Star game ==
The SJHL click for three unanswered goals in the third period, two within 25 seconds, to beat the MJHL 5-2 in the 3rd annual Manitoba - Saskatchewan all-star game was played in Brandon on February 3. Ron Boehm, Fran Huck, Gary Holland, Wayne Doll, and Larry Mickey scored for Saskatchewan, who with the win, retain the Charlie Gardner Memorial Trophy. Replying for the Manitoba were Jim Irving and Felix LaVallee.
MJHL Lineup:

- Goal: Ken Kachulak (Brandon); Ben Harper (Fort Frances)
- Defence: Bob Ash (Brandon); Jim Murray (Brandon); George Hayes (Brandon);
  Terry Ball (Rangers); Bob Howard (Rangers)
- Centre: Felix LaVallee (Brandon); Dan Johnson (Fort Frances); Alton White (Rangers)
- Leftwing: Ted Irvine (Braves); Jim Irving (Rangers); Dunc Rousseau (Braves)
- Rightwing: John Vopni (Brandon); Freeman Asmundson (Monarchs); Wayne Kitchen (Braves)
- Coach: Ron Maxwell (Brandon); Manager: Bill Addison (Braves)

== Playoffs ==
Semi-Finals

Brandon defeated Rangers 4-games-to-none
Fort Frances defeated Monarchs 4-games-to-none

Turnbull Cup Championship

Brandon defeated Fort Frances 10-points-to-2 (9 point series)

Western Memorial Cup Inter-Provincial Playoff

Brandon defeated Fort William Canadiens (TBJHL) 4-games-to-2

Western Memorial Cup Semi-Final

Brandon lost to Edmonton Oil Kings (CAHL) 4-games-to-1

== Awards ==
Trophy	Winner	Team
MVP		
Top Goaltender	Ken Kachulak	Brandon Wheat Kings
Rookie of the Year		
Sportsmanship Award	Jim Irving	Winnipeg Rangers
Scoring Champion	John Vopni	Brandon Wheat Kings
Most Goals	John Vopni	Brandon Wheat Kings

== All-Star teams ==
First All-Star Team
Goaltender	Ken Kachulak	Brandon Wheat Kings
Defencemen	Bob Ash	Brandon Wheat Kings
Defencemen	Jim Murray	Brandon Wheat Kings
Centreman	Felix LaVallee	Brandon Wheat Kings
Leftwinger	Ted Irvine	Winnipeg Braves
Rightwinger	John Vopni	Brandon Wheat Kings
Coach	Ron Maxwell	Brandon Wheat Kings
Second All-Star Team
Goaltender	Ben Harper	Fort Frances Royals
Defencemen (tie)	Terry Ball	Winnipeg Rangers
Defencemen (tie)	Bob Howard	Winnipeg Rangers
Defencemen (tie)	George Hayes	Brandon Wheat Kings
Centreman	Dan Johnson	Fort Frances Royals
Leftwinger	Jim Irving	Winnipeg Rangers
Rightwinger	Freeman Asmundson	Winnipeg Monarchs
