= 1976–77 NHL transactions =

The following is a list of all team-to-team transactions that have occurred in the National Hockey League during the 1976–77 NHL season. It lists what team each player has been traded to, signed by, or claimed by, and for which player(s) or draft pick(s), if applicable.

== Trades between teams ==
=== May ===
May 26, 1976	To Boston Bruins Rick Middleton	To New York Rangers Ken Hodge
May 28, 1976	To Los Angeles Kings John Campbell	To New York Rangers Mark Heaslip

=== June ===
June 12, 1976	To Montreal Canadiens 3rd-rd pick - 1977 Amateur Draft (# 49 - Moe Robinson); 1st-rd pick - 1978 Amateur Draft (# 8 - Dan Geoffrion)	To Los Angeles Kings Glenn Goldup; 3rd-rd pick - 1978 Amateur Draft (DET - # 53 - Doug Derkson)^{1}

1. Los Angeles' third-round pick went to Detroit as the result of a trade on January 9, 1978 that sent Danny Grant to Los Angeles in exchange for the rights to Barry Long and this pick.

=== August ===
August 11, 1976	To Montreal Canadiens 3rd-rd pick - 1978 Amateur Draft (# 42 - Richard David)	To Pittsburgh Penguins Don Awrey
August 23, 1976	To Minnesota North Stars Gary Smith	To Vancouver Canucks Cesare Maniago

=== September ===
September 12, 1976	To Vancouver Canucks 5th-rd pick - 1978 Amateur Draft (# 73 - Tim Thomlison)	To Colorado Rockies 4th-rd pick - 1977 Amateur Draft (# 56 - Dave Morrow)
September 13, 1976	To Montreal Canadiens cash Canadiens option to swap 1st-rd picks - 1980 Entry Draft (# 1 - Doug Wickenheiser)^{1}	To Colorado Rockies Ron Andruff; Sean Shanahan
September 15, 1976	To Toronto Maple Leafs cash	To Colorado Rockies Doug Favell
September 27, 1976	To Toronto Maple Leafs Blair MacKasey	To Washington Capitals cash
September 28, 1976	To Toronto Maple Leafs 2nd-rd pick - 1977 Amateur Draft (# 24 - Bob Gladney)	To Chicago Black Hawks rights to Jim Harrison
September 29, 1976	To Los Angeles Kings Dave Schultz	To Philadelphia Flyers 4th-rd pick - 1977 Amateur Draft (# 67 - Yves Guillemette); 2nd-rd pick - 1978 Amateur Draft (COL - # 27 - Merlin Malinowski)^{2}

1. Montreal exercised the option and swap the 19th pick for the 1st overall pick in 1980.
2. Philadelphia's second-round pick went to Colorado as the result of a trade on June 15, 1978 that sent Colorado's second-round pick in 1979 in exchange for this pick.

=== October ===
October 6, 1976	To Vancouver Canucks Dave Fortier; Ralph Stewart	To New York Islanders cash
October 8, 1976	To Pittsburgh Penguins Dunc Wilson	To New York Rangers 4th-rd pick - 1978 Amateur Draft (# 59 - Dave Silk)
October 18, 1976	To Los Angeles Kings 5th-rd pick - 1977 Amateur Draft (# 84 - Julian Baretta)	To Pittsburgh Penguins Mike Corrigan

=== November ===
November 11, 1976	To Minnesota North Stars Nick Beverley; Bill Fairbairn	To New York Rangers Bill Goldsworthy
November 24, 1976	To Montreal Canadiens 3rd-rd pick - 1979 Entry Draft (# 43 - Craig Levie)	To Colorado Rockies John Van Boxmeer
November 24, 1976	To Washington Capitals cash	To Philadelphia Flyers Harvey Bennett Jr.
November 30, 1976	To Detroit Red Wings Greg Joly	To Washington Capitals Bryan Watson

=== December ===
December 2, 1976	To Vancouver Canucks Larry Carriere; Hilliard Graves	To Atlanta Flames John Gould; 2nd-rd pick - 1977 Amateur Draft (# 31 - Brian Hill)
December 4, 1976	To Washington Capitals Bill Collins	To Philadelphia Flyers cash
December 20, 1976	To Boston Bruins Rick Smith	To St. Louis Blues Joe Zanussi

=== January ===
January 20, 1977	To Vancouver Canucks Larry Goodenough; Jack McIlhargey	To Philadelphia Flyers Bob Dailey
January 22, 1977	To Cleveland Barons Gary Edwards; Juha Widing	To Los Angeles Kings Jim Moxey; Gary Simmons

=== February ===
February 11, 1977	To Colorado Rockies rights to Danny Gruen	To Detroit Red Wings cash
February 17, 1977	To Detroit Red Wings Steve Coates; Dave Kelly; Terry Murray; Bob Ritchie	To Philadelphia Flyers Mike Korney; Rick Lapointe
February 18, 1977	To Vancouver Canucks Derek Sanderson	To St. Louis Blues cash
February 25, 1977	To Montreal Canadiens cash future considerations	To Detroit Red Wings rights to Marty Howe

=== March ===
March 3, 1977	To Buffalo Sabres cash	To Washington Capitals Roger Crozier
March 8, 1977	To Toronto Maple Leafs Tracy Pratt	To Colorado Rockies 3rd-rd pick - 1977 Amateur Draft (# 47 - Randy Pierce)

== Additional sources ==
- hockeydb.com - search for player and select "show trades"
- "NHL trades for 1976-1977". NHL Trade Tracker.
