= Jim Murray (ice hockey) =

Canadian ice hockey player

- Born: November 25, 1943 (age 81); Virden, Manitoba, Canada
- Height: 6 ft 1 in (185 cm)
- Weight: 165 lb (75 kg; 11 st 11 lb)
- Position: Defence
- Shot: Left
- Played for: Los Angeles Kings
- Playing career: 1964–1979

James Arnold Murray (born November 25, 1943) is a Canadian former ice hockey defenceman, who played 30 games in the National Hockey League with the Los Angeles Kings during the 1967–68 season. In those 30 games, he made two assists and collected 14 penalty minutes. The rest of his career, which lasted from 1964 to 1978, was spent in the minor leagues.

== Career statistics ==
=== Regular season and playoffs ===
			Regular season					Playoffs
Season	Team	League	GP	G	A	Pts	PIM	GP	G	A	Pts	PIM
1961–62	Brandon Wheat Kings	MJHL	37	6	8	14	32	8	0	1	1	16
1961–62	Brandon Wheat Kings	M-Cup	—	—	—	—	—	11	0	3	3	9
1962–63	Brandon Wheat Kings	MJHL	39	11	21	32	51	10	4	6	10	12
1962–63	Brandon Wheat Kings	M-Cup	—	—	—	—	—	9	2	4	6	6
1963–64	Brandon Wheat Kings	MJHL	30	11	23	34	38	10	1	8	9	24
1963–64	Brandon Wheat Kings	M-Cup	—	—	—	—	—	11	2	4	6	14
1964–65	New York Rovers	EHL	72	10	29	39	113	—	—	—	—	—
1965–66	Knoxville Knights	EHL	70	9	42	51	50	3	0	2	2	2
1966–67	Knoxville Knights	EHL	72	17	35	52	79	4	0	1	1	4
1967–68	Los Angeles Kings	NHL	30	0	2	2	14	—	—	—	—	—
1967–68	Springfield Kings	AHL	30	2	8	10	33	—	—	—	—	—
1968–69	Springfield Kings	AHL	72	7	26	33	83	—	—	—	—	—
1969–70	Phoenix Roadrunners	WHL	72	2	28	30	93	—	—	—	—	—
1970–71	Phoenix Roadrunners	WHL	72	4	18	22	58	10	0	1	1	14
1971–72	Phoenix Roadrunners	WHL	72	7	30	37	136	6	0	4	4	10
1972–73	Phoenix Roadrunners	WHL	72	10	53	63	138	10	1	6	7	8
1973–74	Phoenix Roadrunners	WHL	76	10	39	49	113	—	—	—	—	—
1974–75	Johnstown Jets	NAHL	5	0	2	2	2	—	—	—	—	—
1974–75	Winston-Salem Polar Twins	SHL	37	7	33	40	74	7	1	5	6	6
1977–78	Brandon Olympics	CCSHL	30	5	17	22	32	—	—	—	—	—
WHL totals			364	33	168	201	538	26	1	11	12	32
NHL totals			30	0	2	2	14	—	—	—	—	—

== Awards and achievements ==
- MJHL First All-Star Team (1964)
- Turnbull Cup (MJHL) Championship (1962, 1963, 1964)
