= 1966–67 MJHL season =

Manitoba ice hockey season

The Manitoba Junior Hockey League (MJHL) expanded from four to six teams for the 1966–67 season when it readmitted the Brandon Wheat Kings and accepted the Selkirk Steelers. MJHL commissioner Jimmy Dunn announced his resignation on October 24, 1966, and cited personal reasons. Despite being offered a pay raise, he felt that the increase in teams made the job too much for him and had "taken the fun out of it". His resignation came shortly after a game between the Winnipeg Rangers and the Brandon Wheat Kings in which 242 penalty minutes were given in the first period.

== Champion ==
On April 7 in Flin Flon, the Bombers won the MJHL championship and were presented with the Turnbull Memorial Trophy.

== League notes ==
Brandon Wheat Kings and Flin Flon Bombers transfer from the Saskatchewan Junior Hockey League after the league folds.
The MJHL expands to Selkirk, with the Selkirk Steelers joining the league.
The Winnipeg Braves change their name to the St. James Braves.
Bobby Clarke (Flin Flon) set league records for most goals (71), assists (112), and points (183),
in a single season.

== Regular season ==
| League Standings | GP | W | L | T | Pts | GF | GA |
|---|---|---|---|---|---|---|---|
| Flin Flon Bombers | 48 | 42 | 6 | 0 | 104 | 407 | 125 |
| Brandon Wheat Kings | 57 | 47 | 9 | 1 | 95 | 416 | 178 |
| Winnipeg Rangers | 57 | 34 | 19 | 4 | 74 | 263 | 201 |
| Winnipeg Monarchs | 57 | 21 | 34 | 2 | 46 | 235 | 316 |
| St. James Braves | 56 | 21 | 34 | 1 | 43 | 254 | 361 |
| Selkirk Steelers | 57 | 14 | 42 | 1 | 29 | 216 | 382 |
| Winnipeg Warriors | 58 | 10 | 45 | 3 | 23 | 162 | 390 |

Flin Flon played 12 four point games, winning 10.
Monarchs & Rangers each won 1 four point game.
Some postponed games not played.

== All-Star game ==
On February 24, the MJHL All-Stars played Canada's National Team at St. James.
MJHL Lineup:

- Goal: Chris Worthy (Flin Flon); George Surmay (Rangers)
- Defence: Gerry Hart (Flin Flon); Jim Pritchard (Monarchs); Jack Criel (Flin Flon);
  Larry Brown (Brandon); George Sykes (Rangers)
- Centre: Bobby Clarke (Flin Flon); Juha Widing (Brandon); Dezi Desrochers (Selkirk)
- Leftwing: Cal Swenson (Brandon); Murray Klein (Rangers); Chuck Lefley (Rangers)
- Rightwing: Reggie Leach (Flin Flon); Bill Fairbairn (Brandon); Jim Benzelock (St. James)
- Coach: Ed Dorohoy (Brandon)

== Playoffs ==
Quarter-Finals

Brandon defeated St. James 3-games-to-none
Rangers defeated Selkirk 3-games-to-none

Semi-Finals

Flin Flon defeated Monarchs 3-games-to-none
Brandon defeated Rangers 4-games-to-1

Turnbull Cup Championship

Flin Flon defeated Brandon 3-games-to-2

Western Memorial Cup Semi-Final

Flin Flon lost to Port Arthur Marrs (TBJHL) 4-games-to-2

== Awards ==
| Trophy | Winner | Team |
|---|---|---|
| MVP | | |
| Top Goaltender | Chris Worthy | Flin Flon Bombers |
| Rookie of the Year | Bobby Clarke | Flin Flon Bombers |
| Hockey Ability & Sportsmanship Award | Butch Goring | Winnipeg Rangers |
| Scoring Champion | Bobby Clarke | Flin Flon Bombers |
| Most Goals | Bobby Clarke | Flin Flon Bombers |

== All-Star teams ==
First All-Star Team
| Goaltender | Chris Worthy | Flin Flon Bombers |
| Defencemen | Gerry Hart | Flin Flon Bombers |
| Defencemen | Jim Pritchard | Winnipeg Monarchs |
| Centreman | Bobby Clarke | Flin Flon Bombers |
| Leftwinger | Cal Swenson | Brandon Wheat Kings |
| Rightwinger | Reggie Leach | Flin Flon Bombers |
| Coach | Ed Dorohoy | Brandon Wheat Kings |
Second All-Star Team
| Goaltender | George Surmay | Winnipeg Rangers |
| Defencemen | Jack Criel | Flin Flon Bombers |
| Defencemen | Larry Brown | Brandon Wheat Kings |
| Centreman | Juha Widing | Brandon Wheat Kings |
| Leftwinger | Murray Klein | Winnipeg Rangers |
| Rightwinger | Bill Fairbairn | Brandon Wheat Kings |
