= Chuck Lefley =

Canadian ice hockey player (1950–2026)

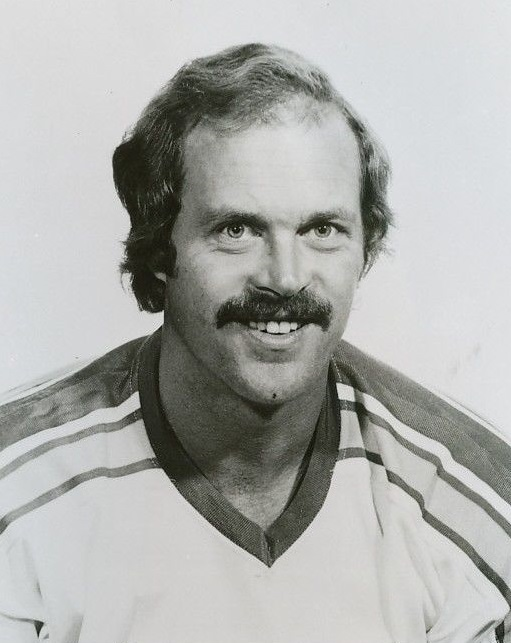
- Lefley in 1980
- Born: January 20, 1950 Winnipeg, Manitoba, Canada
- Died: January 26, 2026 (aged 76) Grosse Isle, Manitoba, Canada
- Height: 6 ft 2 in (188 cm)
- Weight: 190 lb (86 kg; 13 st 8 lb)
- Position: Centre
- Shot: Left
- Played for: Montreal Canadiens; St. Louis Blues; Jokerit; Düsseldorfer EG
- National team: Canada
- NHL draft: 6th overall, 1970; Montreal Canadiens
- Playing career: 1970–1980

Charles Thomas Lefley (January 20, 1950 – January 26, 2026) was a Canadian professional ice hockey forward. He played in the National Hockey League with the Montreal Canadiens and St. Louis Blues from 1970 to 1980. With the Canadiens he won the Stanley Cup twice, in 1971 and 1973. Internationally he played for the Canadian national team at the 1969 World Championship.

== Biography ==
Lefley was born in Winnipeg, Manitoba on January 20, 1950. Drafted by the Montreal Canadiens sixth overall in the 1970 NHL Amateur Draft, Lefley started his National Hockey League career with Montreal in 1971. He was traded from the Canadiens to the St. Louis Blues for Don Awrey on November 28, 1974. In 1975–76 he set a Blues franchise record by scoring 43 goals, a record later broken by Wayne Babych. Lefley, whose older brother Bryan Lefley spent five seasons in the NHL, left the Blues in 1977-78, joining Jokerit Helsinki for one season scoring 12 goals and 11 assists in 24 games. He returned to the Blues in 1979-80, playing parts of two seasons before retiring after the 1980–81 season.

Lefley died on January 26, 2026, at the age of 76.

== Awards and achievements ==
- MJHL Rookie of Year (1966)
- Turnbull Cup MJHL Championship (1966)
- Calder Cup (AHL) Championship (1972)
- Stanley Cup Championship (1971, 1973)
- Honoured Member of the Manitoba Hockey Hall of Fame

== Career statistics ==
=== Regular season and playoffs ===
			Regular season					Playoffs
Season	Team	League	GP	G	A	Pts	PIM	GP	G	A	Pts	PIM
1965–66	Winnipeg Rangers	MJHL	46	19	20	39	10	9	4	5	9	2
1966–67	Winnipeg Rangers	MJHL	43	25	21	46	33	7	6	2	8	2
1967–68	Canadian National Team	Intl	—	—	—	—	—	—	—	—	—	—
1968–69	Canadian National Team	Intl	—	—	—	—	—	—	—	—	—	—
1969–70	Canadian National Team	Intl	—	—	—	—	—	—	—	—	—	—
1969–70	Brandon Wheat Kings	WCHL	7	6	6	12	0	—	—	—	—	—
1970–71	Montreal Canadiens	NHL	1	0	0	0	0	1	0	0	0	0
1970–71	Montreal Voyageurs	AHL	48	16	19	35	33	3	1	1	2	2
1971–72	Montreal Canadiens	NHL	16	0	2	2	0	—	—	—	—	—
1971–72	Nova Scotia Voyageurs	AHL	45	15	30	45	18	15	7	7	14	0
1972–73	Montreal Canadiens	NHL	65	21	25	46	22	17	3	5	8	6
1973–74	Montreal Canadiens	NHL	74	23	31	54	34	6	0	1	1	0
1974–75	Montreal Canadiens	NHL	18	1	2	3	4	—	—	—	—	—
1974–75	St. Louis Blues	NHL	57	23	26	49	24	2	0	0	0	2
1975–76	St. Louis Blues	NHL	75	43	42	85	41	2	2	1	3	0
1976–77	St. Louis Blues	NHL	71	11	30	41	12	1	0	1	1	2
1977–78	Jokerit	SM-l	24	11	12	23	12	—	—	—	—	—
1978–79	Düsseldorfer EG	GER	26	17	5	22	2	—	—	—	—	—
1979–80	St. Louis Blues	NHL	28	6	6	12	0	—	—	—	—	—
1980–81	St. Louis Blues	NHL	2	0	0	0	0	—	—	—	—	—
NHL totals			407	128	164	292	137	29	5	8	13	10

=== International ===
Year	Team	Event	GP	G	A	Pts	PIM
1969	Canada	WC	7	0	1	1	10
Senior totals			7	0	1	1	10

Preceded by Ray Martynuik	Montreal Canadiens first-round draft pick 1970	Succeeded by Guy Lafleur
