= Juha Widing =

Swedish ice hockey player

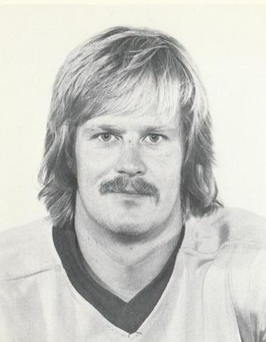
- Widing in 1974 photo
- Born: July 4, 1947 Oulu, Finland
- Died: December 30, 1984 (aged 37) Kelowna, British Columbia, Canada
- Height: 6 ft 1 in (185 cm)
- Weight: 190 lb (86 kg; 13 st 8 lb)
- Position: Centre
- Shot: Left
- Played for: New York Rangers; Los Angeles Kings; Cleveland Barons; Edmonton Oilers
- Playing career: 1967–1978

Juha Markku Widing (VEE-ding; July 4, 1947 – December 30, 1984) was a Swedish-Finnish professional ice hockey centre and the third Finn (after Albert Pudas and Pentti Lund) to play in the National Hockey League (NHL). Here he spent eight seasons, mostly with the Los Angeles Kings. His nicknames were "Whitey" and "Flying Finn".

== Career ==
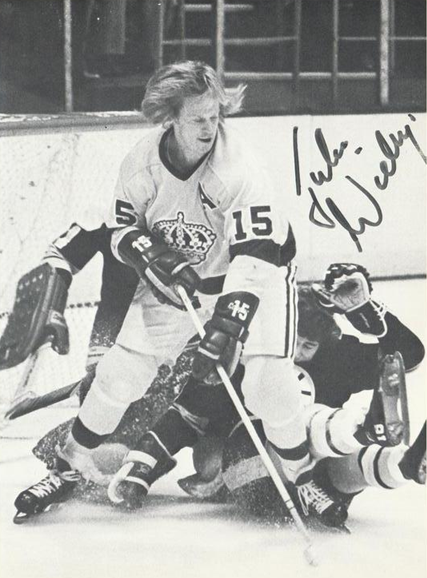
Widing in 1974 action shot for the Kings

Widing was born in Oulu, Finland, to a Finnish mother, Hilkka (née Moilanen). They moved to Sweden with his Swedish-speaking Finnish stepfather, Yngve Widing, when he was four years old, and he received Swedish citizenship. In 1964 his family moved to Brandon, Manitoba, Canada, so he could play junior ice hockey for the Brandon Wheat Kings. He played three seasons there, improving his point total each season from 38 to 114 and then finally to 144 in only a 50-game schedule. He was named to the Manitoba Junior Hockey League Second All-Star Team in 1967.

Widing joined the New York Rangers of the NHL in 1969–70, thus becoming the first mostly European-trained player with a full-time contract in the NHL. After only 44 games he was traded to the Los Angeles Kings along with Réal Lemieux for Ted Irvine. In Los Angeles he developed into a legitimate scoring threat, garnering at least 55 points in five consecutive seasons. Kings' owner Jack Kent Cooke gave him the nickname "Whitey" and instructed his announcers to pronounce his last name as "why-ding" as opposed to the real pronunciation of "vee-ding". He often played on a line with Bob Berry and Mike Corrigan known as "the hot line".

By 1976 Widing's productivity had dropped considerably, and he was traded to the Cleveland Barons the following season. In 1977–78, he played for the Edmonton Oilers of the World Hockey Association, scoring 42 points in his final professional season. Traded to the Indianapolis Racers for Bill Goldsworthy, he retired instead of playing.

=== Statistics ===
==== Regular season and playoffs ====
			Regular season					Playoffs
Season	Team	League	GP	G	A	Pts	PIM	GP	G	A	Pts	PIM
1963–64	GAIS	SWE II	18	12	—	—	—	—	—	—	—	—
1964–65	Brandon Wheat Kings	SJHL	45	23	15	38	26	9	3	5	8	6
1965–66	Brandon Wheat Kings	SJHL	50	62	52	114	29	11	8	14	22	4
1966–67	Brandon Wheat Kings	MJHL	43	70	74	144	64	9	5	10	15	6
1967–68	Omaha Knights	CHL	62	27	33	60	19	—	—	—	—	—
1968–69	Omaha Knights	CHL	72	41	39	80	58	7	2	4	6	0
1969–70	New York Rangers	NHL	44	7	7	14	10	—	—	—	—	—
1969–70	Los Angeles Kings	NHL	4	0	2	2	2	—	—	—	—	—
1970–71	Los Angeles Kings	NHL	78	25	40	65	24	—	—	—	—	—
1971–72	Los Angeles Kings	NHL	78	27	28	55	26	—	—	—	—	—
1972–73	Los Angeles Kings	NHL	77	16	54	70	30	—	—	—	—	—
1973–74	Los Angeles Kings	NHL	71	27	30	57	26	5	1	0	1	2
1974–75	Los Angeles Kings	NHL	80	24	36	60	46	3	0	2	2	0
1975–76	Los Angeles Kings	NHL	67	7	15	22	26	—	—	—	—	—
1976–77	Los Angeles Kings	NHL	47	3	8	11	8	—	—	—	—	—
1976–77	Cleveland Barons	NHL	29	6	8	14	10	—	—	—	—	—
1977–78	Edmonton Oilers	WHA	71	18	24	42	8	—	—	—	—	—
WHA totals			71	18	24	42	8	—	—	—	—	—
NHL totals			575	144	226	370	208	8	1	2	3	2

==== International ====
Year	Team	Event	GP	G	A	Pts	PIM
1976	Sweden	CC	5	1	1	2	0

== Death ==
Widing settled in British Columbia in 1978 and died of a heart attack on December 30, 1984, aged 37.
