= Joe Zorica =

Canadian ice hockey player

- Born: November 28, 1934 (age 90); Noranda, Quebec, Canada
- Height: 5 ft 10 in (178 cm)
- Weight: 180 lb (82 kg; 12 st 12 lb)
- Position: Right wing
- Shot: Left
- Played for: Knoxville Knights; Nashville Dixie Flyers
- Playing career: 1958–1971

Joe Zorica (born November 28, 1934) is a Canadian retired professional hockey player who played 375 games in the Eastern Hockey League with the Knoxville Knights and Nashville Dixie Flyers.
