= Ted Irvine =

Canadian ice hockey player

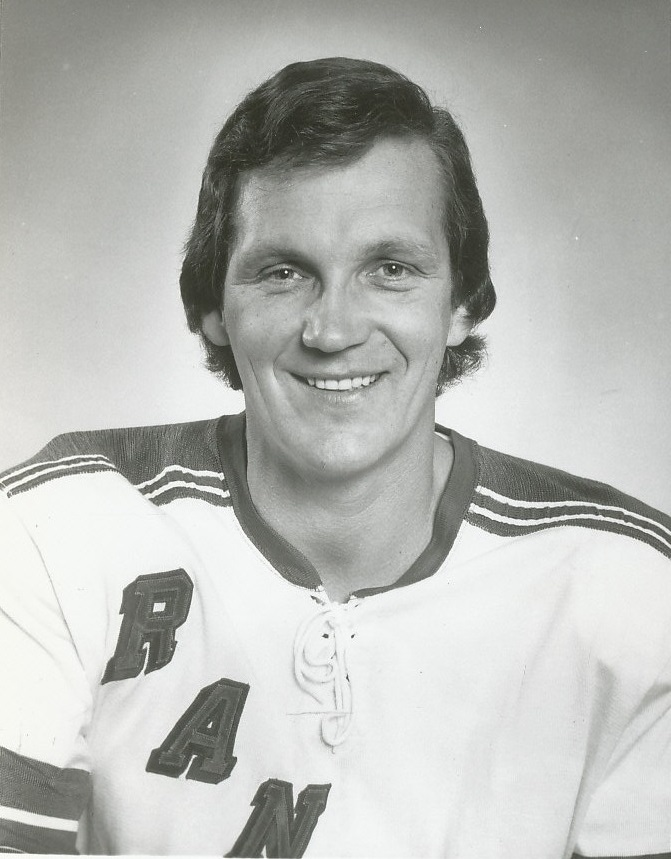
- Irvine in 1970
- Born: December 8, 1944 (age 81) Winnipeg, Manitoba, Canada
- Height: 6 ft 2 in (188 cm)
- Weight: 195 lb (88 kg; 13 st 13 lb)
- Position: Left wing
- Shot: Left
- Played for: Boston Bruins; New York Rangers; Los Angeles Kings; St. Louis Blues
- Playing career: 1963–1977

Edward Amos Irvine (born December 8, 1944) is a Canadian former professional hockey player. He played in the National Hockey League from 1964 to 1977.

== Career ==
Irvine was a left winger. He amassed a total of 331 points in 774 games played over a 15-year professional career. In his NHL career, Irvine played for the Boston Bruins, Los Angeles Kings, New York Rangers and St. Louis Blues between 1964 and 1977. His jersey number was 27.

Irvine appeared on an episode of the professional wrestling television show AEW Dynamite, on November 27, 2019. He was revealed as a surprise guest for his son, professional wrestler Chris Jericho, to celebrate Thanksgiving. During the appearance, Irvine learned that they were in Chicago and went on to taunt the crowd by mentioning the number of times the New York Rangers defeated the Chicago Blackhawks.

== Personal life ==
Irvine is of Scottish ancestry. He is married to Bonnie Davis. He is the father of professional wrestler and musician Chris Irvine, better known by his ring name Chris Jericho.

== Career statistics ==
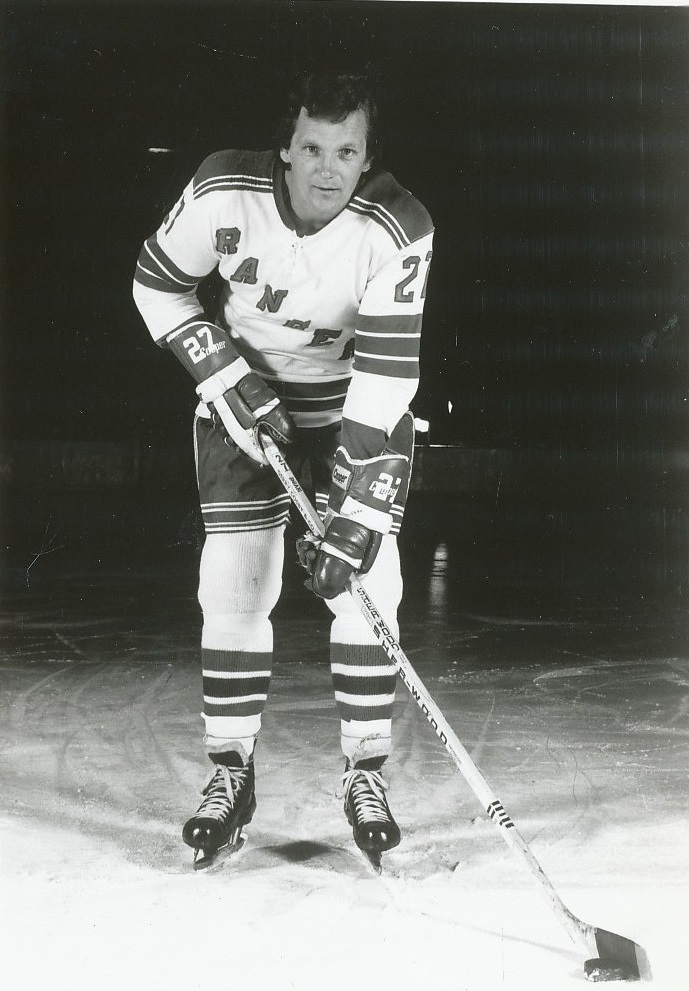
Irvine playing for the New York Rangers in 1970

=== Regular season and playoffs ===
			Regular season					Playoffs
Season	Team	League	GP	G	A	Pts	PIM	GP	G	A	Pts	PIM
1961–62	St. Boniface Canadiens	MJHL	36	6	7	13	4	4	5	0	5	0
1962–63	St. Boniface Canadiens	MJHL	32	31	23	54	13	8	7	5	12	6
1962–63	St. Boniface Canadiens	M-Cup	—	—	—	—	—	5	2	2	4	4
1963–64	St. Boniface Canadiens	MJHL	19	17	11	28	19	—	—	—	—	—
1963–64	Winnipeg Braves	MJHL	10	3	5	8	2	—	—	—	—	—
1963–64	Boston Bruins	NHL	1	0	0	0	0	—	—	—	—	—
1963–64	Minneapolis Bruins	CPHL	3	1	5	6	0	4	1	1	2	2
1964–65	Minneapolis Bruins	CPHL	68	15	16	31	40	5	0	1	1	6
1965–66	Oklahoma City Blazers	CPHL	69	26	20	46	27	9	6	3	9	4
1966–67	Oklahoma City Blazers	CPHL	63	15	17	32	54	11	6	1	7	0
1967–68	Los Angeles Kings	NHL	73	18	22	40	26	6	1	3	4	2
1968–69	Los Angeles Kings	NHL	76	15	24	39	47	11	5	1	6	7
1969–70	Los Angeles Kings	NHL	58	11	13	24	28	—	—	—	—	—
1969–70	New York Rangers	NHL	17	0	3	3	10	6	1	2	3	8
1970–71	New York Rangers	NHL	76	20	18	38	137	12	1	2	3	28
1971–72	New York Rangers	NHL	78	15	21	36	66	16	4	5	9	19
1972–73	New York Rangers	NHL	53	8	12	20	54	10	1	3	4	20
1973–74	New York Rangers	NHL	75	26	20	46	105	13	3	5	8	16
1974–75	New York Rangers	NHL	79	17	17	34	66	3	0	1	1	11
1975–76	St. Louis Blues	NHL	69	10	13	23	80	3	0	2	2	2
1976–77	St. Louis Blues	NHL	69	14	14	28	38	3	0	0	0	2
1977–78	St. James Flyers	CSHL	12	6	6	12	30	—	—	—	—	—
NHL totals			724	154	177	331	657	83	16	24	40	115

== Awards and achievements ==
- MJHL Co-Goal Scoring Leader (1963)
- MJHL First All-Star Team (1964)
- CPHL Championships (1966 and 1967)
- Honoured Member of the Manitoba Hockey Hall of Fame
- In the 2009 book 100 Ranger Greats, the authors ranked Irvine at No. 74 all-time of the 901 New York Rangers who had played during the team's first 82 seasons.
