= Terry Ball (ice hockey) =

Canadian ice hockey player (b. 1944)

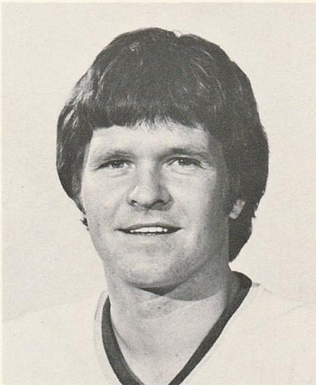
- Born: November 29, 1944 (age 81) Selkirk, Manitoba, Canada
- Height: 5 ft 9 in (175 cm)
- Weight: 160 lb (73 kg; 11 st 6 lb)
- Position: Defence
- Shot: Right
- Played for: Philadelphia Flyers; Buffalo Sabres; Minnesota Fighting Saints; Cleveland Crusaders; Cincinnati Stingers; Birmingham Bulls; HIFK
- Playing career: 1964–1979

Terrance James Ball (born November 29, 1944) is a Canadian former professional ice hockey defenceman. Ball played in the National Hockey League, the World Hockey Association, the Finnish SM-Liiga, and several minor leagues in a career that spanned from 1964 until 1979.

== Early life ==
Ball was born in Selkirk, Manitoba. He played junior with the Winnipeg Rangers and Brandon Wheat Kings, and Kitchener Rangers.

== Career ==
In 1963–64, Ball played eight games with the Vancouver Canucks of the Western Hockey League but finished the season in junior. He played one further season in junior, with Kitchener and signed underage with the New York Rangers.

In 1964–65, Ball moved on to minor professional leagues, with the Minnesota Rangers. Ball remained in the New York Rangers farm system until 1967 when he was claimed in the expansion draft by Philadelphia. He played one game for the Flyers but spent the rest of the season with their Quebec Aces affiliate. Ball played full-time in the NHL in 1969–70 with the Flyers, before being traded in the off-season to the Pittsburgh Penguins. Ball did not play in the NHL for the Penguins and was traded to the Buffalo Sabres in 1971. Ball was a European scout for the Edmonton Oilers during the 1970s.

Ball was chosen by the World Hockey Association's Minnesota Fighting Saints in the 1972 general draft, and he signed with them. Ball played three seasons with Minnesota before being claimed by the Cleveland Crusaders in 1975. Ball played one season with Cleveland before being traded to the Cincinnati Stingers. Ball was picked up by the Birmingham Bulls in 1976, and he split the season between the Bulls and the minors.

In 1977, Ball signed with HIFK Helsinki, where he played two further seasons of hockey before ending his career.

Ball was inducted into the Manitoba Sports Hall of Fame in 2012.

== Career statistics ==
=== Regular season and playoffs ===
			Regular season					Playoffs
Season	Team	League	GP	G	A	Pts	PIM	GP	G	A	Pts	PIM
1961–62	Winnipeg Rangers	MJHL	39	2	2	4	65	3	0	1	1	5
1962–63	Winnipeg Rangers	MJHL	39	8	23	31	104	—	—	—	—	—
1962–63	Brandon Wheat Kings	MJHL	—	—	—	—	—	5	0	0	0	12
1962–63	Brandon Wheat Kings	M-Cup	—	—	—	—	—	5	0	0	0	12
1963–64	Winnipeg Rangers	MJHL	29	6	16	22	110	4	0	2	2	11
1963–64	Vancouver Canucks	WHL	8	0	2	2	4	—	—	—	—	—
1963–64	Winnipeg Maroons	MHL	—	—	—	—	—	3	1	0	1	0
1964–65	Kitchener Rangers	OHA	55	6	47	53	!53	—	—	—	—	—
1964–65	St. Paul Rangers	CHL	—	—	—	—	—	1	0	0	0	0
1965–66	Minnesota Rangers	CHL	68	0	10	10	98	7	1	0	1	17
1966–67	Omaha Knights	CHL	70	5	15	20	78	5	1	0	1	2
1967–68	Philadelphia Flyers	NHL	1	0	0	0	0	—	—	—	—	—
1967–68	Quebec Aces	AHL	72	3	39	42	99	15	1	7	8	22
1968–69	Quebec Aces	AHL	74	14	45	59	72	15	8	8	16	8
1969–70	Philadelphia Flyers	NHL	61	7	18	25	20	—	—	—	—	—
1969–70	Quebec Aces	AHL	10	3	5	8	8	—	—	—	—	—
1970–71	Amarillo Wranglers	CHL	41	5	30	35	24	—	—	—	—	—
1970–71	Buffalo Sabres	NHL	2	0	0	0	0	—	—	—	—	—
1970–71	Salt Lake Golden Eagles	WHL	22	2	12	14	20	—	—	—	—	—
1971–72	Buffalo Sabres	NHL	10	0	1	1	6	—	—	—	—	—
1971–72	Cincinnati Swords	AHL	68	17	39	56	62	10	3	8	11	2
1972–73	Minnesota Fighting Saints	WHA	76	6	34	40	66	5	1	2	3	4
1973–74	Minnesota Fighting Saints	WHA	71	8	28	36	34	11	1	2	3	6
1974–75	Minnesota Fighting Saints	WHA	76	8	37	45	36	12	3	4	7	4
1975–76	Cleveland Crusaders	WHA	23	2	15	17	18	—	—	—	—	—
1975–76	Cincinnati Stingers	WHA	36	3	14	17	12	—	—	—	—	—
1976–77	Birmingham Bulls	WHA	23	1	6	7	8	—	—	—	—	—
1976–77	Oklahoma City Blazers	CHL	15	0	4	4	4	—	—	—	—	—
1977–78	HIFK	FIN	33	1	4	5	44	—	—	—	—	—
1978–79	HIFK	FIN	6	0	2	2	4	—	—	—	—	—
WHA totals			305	28	134	162	174	28	5	8	13	14
NHL totals			74	7	19	26	26	—	—	—	—	—

== Awards and achievements ==
- MJHL All-Star Team (1964)
- Manitoba Hockey Hall of Fame (2011)
