= Wayne Stephenson =

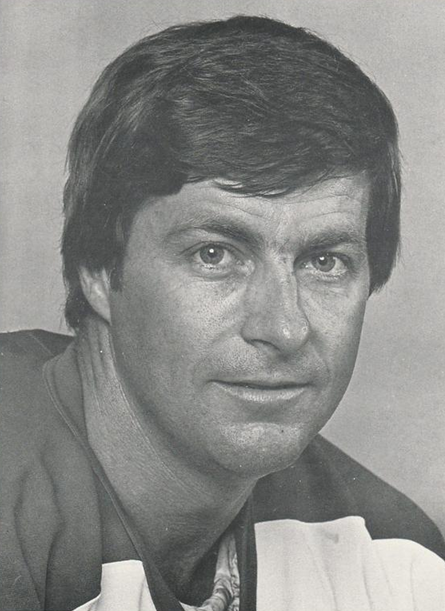
- Born: January 29, 1945 Fort William, Ontario, Canada
- Died: June 22, 2010 (aged 65) Madison, Wisconsin, U.S.
- Height: 5 ft 9 in (175 cm)
- Weight: 175 lb (79 kg; 12 st 7 lb)
- Position: Goaltender
- Caught: Left
- Played for: St. Louis Blues; Philadelphia Flyers; Washington Capitals
- National team: Canada
- Playing career: 1965–1981

Olympic medal record

Men's Ice hockey
Bronze medal – third place	1968 Grenoble	Ice hockey

Wayne Frederick Stephenson (January 29, 1945 – June 22, 2010) was a Canadian professional ice hockey goaltender. He was born in Fort William, Ontario.

== Biography ==
Stephenson played primarily with the Canadian National Team early in his career, and was a member of the 1968 Canadian Olympic Hockey Team that won the Bronze Medal.

Stephenson graduated from the University of Winnipeg with an economics degree and worked as an accountant. After he retired from professional hockey, he worked in the banking industry.

His NHL career would begin in 1971 when he was signed as a free agent by the St. Louis Blues. After three seasons with the Blues, he was traded to the Philadelphia Flyers in September 1974. While in Philadelphia, Wayne toiled as a backup to Bernie Parent for the 1974-1975 season. When Parent suffered a pinched nerve in his neck during the 1975-1976 pre season that required surgery, Stephenson became the Flyers starting goaltender and retained the job when Parent returned late in the season but couldn't regain his previous All Star form. During that year, Stephenson allowed one goal in the Flyers' win over the Soviet Red Army hockey team, a victory Stephenson referred to as the highlight of his career. Stephenson sought a salary increase to reflect his new responsibilities and value to the team in 1976 but management held firm and he returned to the Philadelphia lineup after a two-month holdout. The friction generated by the dispute fueled his exit from Philadelphia. Stephenson was traded to the Washington Capitals prior to the 1979–80 NHL season and played there for two seasons before retiring.

After retiring from the NHL, Stephenson worked with the hockey teams at Barnstable High School in Massachusetts. He died on June 22, 2010 in Madison, Wisconsin at the age of 65.

== Awards and achievements ==
- MJHL First All-Star Team (1965)
- MJHL Top Goaltender (1965)
- MJHL Most Valuable Player (1965)
- Turnbull Cup MJHL Championship (1965)
- Played in the World Championships for Team Canada (1967 and 1969)
- Olympic bronze medalist (1968)
- Stanley Cup championship (1975)
- Played in NHL All-Star Game (1976 and 1978)
- "Honoured Member" of the Manitoba Hockey Hall of Fame

== Career statistics ==
=== Regular season and playoffs ===
			Regular season									Playoffs
Season	Team	League	GP	W	L	T	MIN	GA	SO	GAA	SV%	GP	W	L	MIN	GA	SO	GAA	SV%
1963–64	Winnipeg Braves	MJHL	29	11	15	3	1804	120	0	3.99	—	—	—	—	—	—	—	—	—
1964–65	Winnipeg Braves	MJHL	43	26	12	5	2580	128	2	2.98	—	4	4	0	240	12	0	3.00	—
1964–65	Edmonton Oil Kings	M-Cup	—	—	—	—	—	—	—	—	—	5	1	4	300	25	0	5.00	—
1965–66	Canada	Intl	—	—	—	—	—	—	—	—	—	—	—	—	—	—	—	—	—
1966–67	Canada	Intl	—	—	—	—	—	—	—	—	—	—	—	—	—	—	—	—	—
1967–68	Winnipeg Nationals	WCSHL	15	—	—	—	900	30	1	2.00	—	—	—	—	—	—	—	—	—
1968–69	Canada	Intl	—	—	—	—	—	—	—	—	—	—	—	—	—	—	—	—	—
1969–70	Canada	Intl	—	—	—	—	—	—	—	—	—	—	—	—	—	—	—	—	—
1970–71	Canada	Intl	—	—	—	—	—	—	—	—	—	—	—	—	—	—	—	—	—
1971–72	St. Louis Blues	NHL	2	0	1	0	100	9	0	5.40	.804	—	—	—	—	—	—	—	—
1971–72	Kansas City Blues	CHL	21	5	11	4	1210	80	0	3.97	—	—	—	—	—	—	—	—	—
1972–73	St. Louis Blues	NHL	45	18	15	7	2535	128	1	3.03	.898	3	1	2	160	14	0	5.25	.860
1973–74	St. Louis Blues	NHL	40	13	21	5	2360	123	2	3.13	.898	—	—	—	—	—	—	—	—
1974–75	Philadelphia Flyers	NHL	12	7	2	1	639	29	1	2.72	.895	2	2	0	123	4	1	1.95	.922
1975–76	Philadelphia Flyers	NHL	66	40	10	13	3819	164	1	2.58	.908	8	4	4	494	22	0	2.67	.904
1976–77	Philadelphia Flyers	NHL	21	12	3	2	1065	41	1	2.31	.913	9	4	3	532	23	1	2.59	.903
1977–78	Philadelphia Flyers	NHL	26	14	10	1	1482	68	3	2.75	.893	—	—	—	—	—	—	—	—
1978–79	Philadelphia Flyers	NHL	40	20	10	5	2187	122	2	3.35	.873	4	0	3	213	16	0	4.51	.826
1979–80	Washington Capitals	NHL	56	18	24	10	3146	187	0	3.57	.880	—	—	—	—	—	—	—	—
1980–81	Washington Capitals	NHL	20	4	7	5	1010	66	1	3.92	.867	—	—	—	—	—	—	—	—
NHL totals			328	146	103	49	18,343	937	14	3.06	.892	26	11	12	1522	79	2	3.11	.889

=== International ===
Year	Team	Event	GP	W	L	T	MIN	GA	SO	GAA
1967	Canada	WC	1	1	0	0	60	1	0	1.00
1968	Canada	OG	3	2	0	0	140	3	1	1.29
1969	Canada	WC	8	3	5	0	480	27	1	3.38
Senior totals			12	6	5	0	680	31	2	2.74

"Stephenson's stats". The Goaltender Home Page.
