= Danny Johnson (ice hockey) =

Canadian ice hockey player (1944–1993)

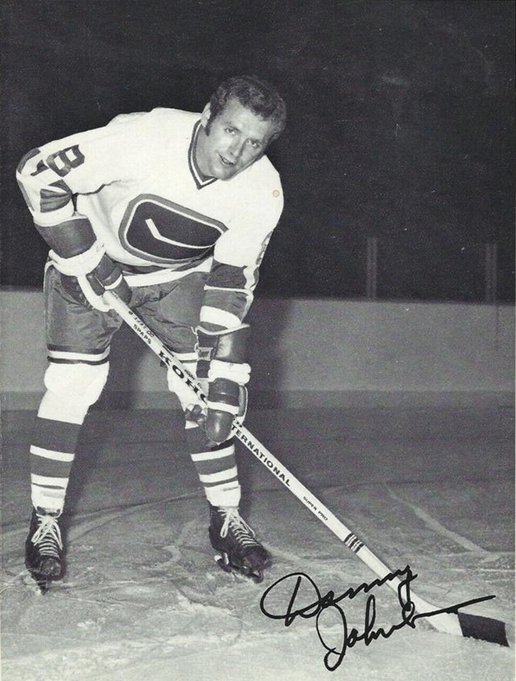
- Johnson in 1970 photo
- Born: October 1, 1944 Winnipegosis, Manitoba, Canada
- Died: March 6, 1993 (aged 48) Winnipeg, Manitoba, Canada
- Height: 5 ft 11 in (180 cm)
- Weight: 170 lb (77 kg; 12 st 2 lb)
- Position: Centre
- Shot: Left
- Played for: Toronto Maple Leafs; Vancouver Canucks; Detroit Red Wings; Winnipeg Jets
- Playing career: 1965–1975

Daniel Douglas Johnson (October 1, 1944 – March 6, 1993) was a Canadian professional ice hockey player who spent three seasons in the National Hockey League (NHL) and another three seasons in the World Hockey Association (WHA) during the 1970s. He was a member of the Vancouver Canucks' inaugural NHL team in 1970.

== Playing career ==
Johnson was signed by the Toronto Maple Leafs following his junior career and spent five seasons with their Central Hockey League (CHL) affiliate, the Tulsa Oilers. He was twice a CHL All-Star and was league MVP in 1970, but only managed to earn a single game with the Leafs in the 1969–70 season.

He was claimed by the Vancouver Canucks in the 1970 NHL Expansion Draft and finally received the opportunity to stick in the NHL. In the Canucks' first season, he appeared in 66 games and recorded 15 goals (seventh on the team) along with 11 assists for 26 points. Midway through the following season, however, he was waived by the Canucks and claimed by the Detroit Red Wings. He struggled to find his offensive touch and finished the 1971–72 season with just 3 goals and 11 points in 54 games between Detroit and Vancouver.

In 1972, Johnson jumped to the fledgling WHA, signing with a Winnipeg Jets team featuring superstar Bobby Hull. He had the most successful stretch of his career in Winnipeg, emerging as a valuable leader and two-way player. In 1972–73, he recorded 19 goals and 42 points en route to helping the Jets to the inaugural Avco Cup Finals. Over the next two years, he added another 34 goals and was named Jets' captain for the 1974–75 before retiring the following year.

Johnson finished his career with 18 goals and 19 assists for 37 points in 121 NHL games, along with 62 penalty minutes. He added 53 goals and 58 assists for 111 points in 232 games in the WHA.

Johnson died of amyoltrophic lateral sclerosis on March 6, 1993.

== Personal life ==
Johnson's grandson Anders Johnson is a Canadian speed skater.

== Career statistics ==
			Regular season					Playoffs
Season	Team	League	GP	G	A	Pts	PIM	GP	G	A	Pts	PIM
1962–63	Flin Flon Bombers	SJHL	45	5	14	19	26	6	2	4	6	2
1963–64	Fort Frances Royals	MJHL	26	8	11	19	49	9	6	2	8	24
1964–65	Brandon Wheat Kings	MJHL	56	26	29	55	90	—	—	—	—	—
1965–66	Tulsa Oilers	CPHL	67	6	23	29	40	10	2	0	2	4
1966–67	Omaha Knights	CPHL	38	9	11	20	20	—	—	—	—	—
1966–67	Tulsa Oilers	CPHL	22	2	6	8	10	12	1	4	5	4
1967–68	Tulsa Oilers	CPHL	69	19	37	56	42	11	3	2	5	21
1968–69	Tulsa Oilers	CHL	72	34	38	72	63	7	2	6	8	12
1969–70	Toronto Maple Leafs	NHL	1	0	0	0	0	—	—	—	—	—
1969–70	Tulsa Oilers	CHL	72	33	46	79	56	6	3	4	7	4
1970–71	Vancouver Canucks	NHL	66	15	11	26	16	—	—	—	—	—
1970–71	Rochester Americans	AHL	7	2	2	4	4	—	—	—	—	—
1971–72	Vancouver Canucks	NHL	11	1	3	4	0	—	—	—	—	—
1971–72	Detroit Red Wings	NHL	43	2	5	7	8	—	—	—	—	—
1972–73	Winnipeg Jets	WHA	76	19	23	42	17	14	4	1	5	0
1973–74	Winnipeg Jets	WHA	78	16	21	37	20	4	1	0	1	5
1974–75	Winnipeg Jets	WHA	78	18	14	32	25	—	—	—	—	—
CPHL/CHL totals			340	103	161	264	231	46	11	16	27	45
NHL totals			121	18	19	37	24	—	—	—	—	—
WHA totals			232	53	58	111	62	18	5	1	6	5

== Awards and achievements ==
- MJHL Second All-Star Team (1964)
- CPHL Championship (1968)
- CHL Second All-Star Team (1969 & 1970)
- Most Valuable Player (CHL) (1970)
- "Honoured Member" of the Manitoba Hockey Hall of Fame

Preceded by Jim Lorentz	CHL Most Valuable Player Award; 1969–70	Succeeded by^{(Shared)} André Dupont; Peter McDuffe; Gerry Ouellette; Joe Zanussi
Preceded by Ab McDonald	Winnipeg Jets captain 1974–75	Succeeded by Lars-Erik Sjoberg
