= Tracy Pratt =

American-born Canadian ice hockey player (born 1943)

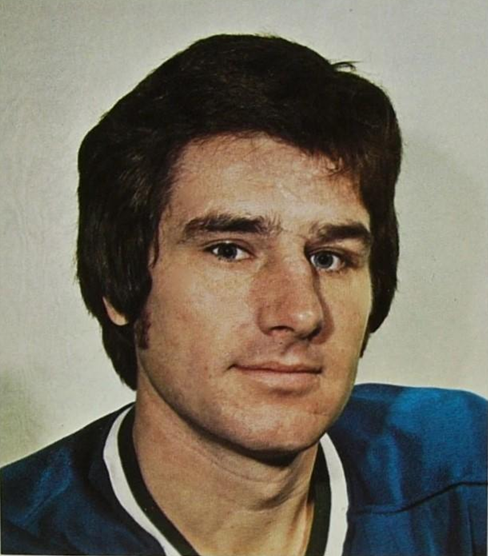
- Born: March 8, 1943 (age 83) New York City, U.S.
- Height: 6 ft 0 in (183 cm)
- Weight: 185 lb (84 kg; 13 st 3 lb)
- Position: Defense
- Shot: Left
- Played for: Toronto Maple Leafs; Colorado Rockies; Vancouver Canucks; Buffalo Sabres; Pittsburgh Penguins; Oakland Seals
- NHL draft: Undrafted
- Playing career: 1967–1977

Tracy Arnold Pratt (born March 8, 1943) is an American-born Canadian former professional ice hockey defenseman who played in the National Hockey League. He was born in New York City, where his father, Hockey Hall of Fame defenseman Babe Pratt, played for the New York Rangers.

== Playing career ==
Unsigned by any NHL team, Pratt started his junior hockey career in 1960 with the Flin Flon Bombers of the Saskatchewan Junior Hockey League. Moving on to the Brandon Wheat Kings of the Manitoba Junior Hockey League in 1962, leading the team's defensemen in the playoffs and winning the league championship.

Signing with the New York Rangers, Pratt turned professional in 1963 with the St. Paul Rangers of the Central Professional Hockey League, he played four seasons in the minors before being selected in the 1967 NHL Expansion Draft in the 14th round, 83rd overall, by the California Seals. He made his NHL debut for the renamed Oakland Seals that season, splitting the time between the Seals and their Vancouver Canucks farm team, and was one of the two players involved in the check that resulted in Bill Masterton's death that season.

Starting the 1969 season with Vancouver, he was traded mid-season to the Pittsburgh Penguins, finishing the season back in the NHL with them. At the 1970 NHL Expansion Draft, Pratt was drafted again, this time 7th overall by the Buffalo Sabres, for whom he went on to play four seasons. A noted pugilist, unusually, in that first season, Pratt had a celebrated fight with future Hockey Hall of Fame goaltender Billy Smith.

In December of 1973, Pratt was dealt with John Gould to the Vancouver Canucks (which had joined the NHL in 1970 with Buffalo for Jerry Korab. He played two and a half seasons for the Canucks before signing as a free agent with the Colorado Rockies in 1976. After a late-season trade that year to the Toronto Maple Leafs, Pratt retired as a hockey player.

Pratt's best year was 1975, when he scored 22 points with a +7 rating, and was one of two Canucks (the other being goaltender Gary Smith) named to play in that season's NHL All-Star Game.

After retirement, Pratt coached for a single season in 1980 as head coach of the Abbotsford Flyers of the Junior A British Columbia Hockey League; the team finished out of the playoffs for the only time in the franchise's history, and he was not retained.

== Career statistics ==
=== Regular season and playoffs ===
			Regular season					Playoffs
Season	Team	League	GP	G	A	Pts	PIM	GP	G	A	Pts	PIM
1959–60	Vancouver College	HS-BC	—	—	—	—	—	—	—	—	—	—
1960–61	Flin Flon Bombers	SJHL	59	3	13	16	83	—	—	—	—	—
1961–62	Flin Flon Bombers	SJHL	51	7	16	23	143	10	2	4	6	36
1962–63	Brandon Wheat Kings	MJHL	33	10	17	27	132	10	3	8	11	38
1962–63	Brandon Wheat Kings	MC	—	—	—	—	—	9	2	4	6	35
1963–64	St. Paul Rangers	CPHL	52	4	15	19	128	11	0	0	0	49
1964–65	St. Paul Rangers	CPHL	66	15	25	40	200	9	1	2	3	27
1965–66	St. Louis Braves	CPHL	70	2	23	25	206	5	1	2	3	6
1966–67	Portland Buckaroos	WHL	63	0	10	10	92	4	0	1	1	4
1967–68	Oakland Seals	NHL	34	0	5	5	90	—	—	—	—	—
1967–68	Vancouver Canucks	WHL	29	1	8	9	73	—	—	—	—	—
1968–69	Vancouver Canucks	WHL	45	2	10	12	74	—	—	—	—	—
1968–69	Pittsburgh Penguins	NHL	18	0	5	5	34	—	—	—	—	—
1969–70	Pittsburgh Penguins	NHL	65	5	7	12	124	10	0	1	1	51
1970–71	Buffalo Sabres	NHL	76	1	7	8	179	—	—	—	—	—
1971–72	Buffalo Sabres	NHL	27	0	10	10	52	—	—	—	—	—
1971–72	Cincinnati Swords	AHL	16	0	11	11	40	—	—	—	—	—
1972–73	Buffalo Sabres	NHL	74	1	15	16	116	6	0	0	0	6
1973–74	Buffalo Sabres	NHL	33	0	7	7	52	—	—	—	—	—
1973–74	Vancouver Canucks	NHL	45	3	8	11	44	—	—	—	—	—
1974–75	Vancouver Canucks	NHL	79	5	17	22	145	3	0	0	0	5
1975–76	Vancouver Canucks	NHL	52	1	5	6	72	2	0	0	0	0
1976–77	Colorado Rockies	NHL	66	1	10	11	110	—	—	—	—	—
1976–77	Toronto Maple Leafs	NHL	11	0	1	1	8	4	0	0	0	0
NHL totals			580	17	97	114	1026	25	0	1	1	62
