= 1962–63 MJHL season =

Manitoba ice hockey season

On March 23, 1963, the Brandon Wheat Kings clinched their second straight MJHL title before more than 4,000 hometown fans in Brandon. The Wheat Kings retained the Turnbull Memorial Trophy.

== League notes ==
League shorten the 40 game regular season in order to accommodate Memorial Cup playoffs.

== Regular season ==
League Standings	GP	W	L	T	Pts	GF	GA
Brandon Wheat Kings	39	32	7	0	64	206	124
St. Boniface Canadiens	39	19	16	4	42	186	148
Winnipeg Monarchs	39	15	21	3	33	141	177
Winnipeg Braves	39	14	22	3	31	127	156
Winnipeg Rangers	40	11	25	4	26	141	196

== All-Star game ==
The Manitoba - Saskatchewan classic was held in Regina on January 21, with SJHL winning 5-2. The SJHL scored the first two goals of the game, held period leads of 2-1 and 4-1. SJHL leading goal scorer Wayne Caufield lead the way with a pair, Joe Watson, Garry Peters, and Granger Evans added singles. MJHL scoring leader Bob Stoyko, and Bobby Brown scored for the MJHL.
MJHL Lineup:

- Goal: Henry Goy (St. Boniface); Rick Best (Braves)
- Defence: Ray Clearwater (Braves); Tracy Pratt (Brandon); George Butterworth (St. Boniface);
  John Trojack (St. Boniface); Terry Ball (Rangers)
- Centre: Bob Stoyko (Brandon); Steve Yoshino (St. Boniface); Bob Toothhill (Braves)
- Leftwing: Ted Irvine (St. Boniface); Jim Irving (Rangers); Dave Janaway (Brandon)
- Rightwing: Jerry Korp (Brandon); Dave Confrey (St. Boniface); Bobby Brown (Brandon)
- Coach: Pete Kapusta (St. Boniface); Manager: Bill Addison (Braves)

== Playoffs ==
Semi-Finals

Brandon defeated Monarchs 3-games-to-2
St. Boniface defeated Braves 3-games-to-none

Turnbull Cup Championship

Brandon defeated St. Boniface 4-games-to-1

Western Memorial Cup Semi-Final

Brandon defeated Fort William Canadiens (TBJHL) 4-games-to-none

Western Memorial Cup Final (Abbott Cup)

Brandon lost to Edmonton Oil Kings (CAHL) 4-games-to-1

== Awards ==
Trophy	Winner	Team
MVP		
Top Goaltender	Ken Kachulak	Brandon Wheat Kings
Rookie of the Year	Ken Kachulak	Brandon Wheat Kings
Sportsmanship Award	Bruce Wright	Winnipeg Monarchs
Scoring Champion	Bob Stoyko	Brandon Wheat Kings
Most Goals (tie)	Ted Irvine	St. Boniface Canadiens
Most Goals (tie)	Wayne Kitchen	St. Boniface Canadiens
