= 1965–66 MJHL season =

Manitoba ice hockey season

Manitoba Junior Hockey League (MJHL) commissioner Jimmy Dunn implemented an automatic one-game minimum suspension for any player who received a match penalty as of the 1965–66 season. He felt that professional hockey influenced fisticuffs in junior hockey and said that, "Any time there's a big fight in the National Hockey League, the kids drop their sticks and put up their dukes in the next game. It happens almost every time".

== Champion ==
On March 18, 1966, at the Winnipeg Arena, the Winnipeg Rangers won the Turnbull Memorial Trophy as MJHL champs.

== Regular season ==
League Standings	GP	W	L	T	Pts	GF	GA
Winnipeg Rangers	48	27	16	5	59	219	186
Winnipeg Warriors	48	19	22	7	45	207	229
Winnipeg Braves	48	20	24	4	44	207	219
Winnipeg Monarchs	48	20	24	4	44	198	197

Tie Breaker (single game) Braves defeated Monarchs

== Playoffs ==
Semi-Finals

Warriors lost to Braves 3-games-to-2

Turnbull Cup Championship

Rangers defeated Braves 4-games-to-1

Western Memorial Cup Semi-Final

Rangers lost to Fort William Canadiens (TBJHL) 4-games-to-none

== Awards ==
Trophy	Winner	Team
MVP	Terry Jones	Winnipeg Rangers
Top Goaltender	George Surmay	Winnipeg Rangers
Rookie of the Year	Chuck Lefley	Winnipeg Rangers
Hockey Ability & Sportsmanship Award	Gerry Mazur	Winnipeg Rangers
Scoring Champion	Terry Jones	Winnipeg Rangers
Most Goals	Terry Jones	Winnipeg Rangers

== All-Star teams ==
First All-Star Team
Goaltender	George Surmay	Winnipeg Rangers
Defencemen	Gord Malinosk	Brandon Wheat Kings
Defencemen	Mel Shewchuk	Winnipeg Warriors
Centreman	Terry Jones	Winnipeg Rangers
Leftwinger	Brent McLean	Winnipeg Monarchs
Rightwinger	Bob Anderson	Winnipeg Rangers
Coach	Jack Bownass	Winnipeg Rangers
Second All-Star Team
Goaltender	Bob Tole	Winnipeg Monarchs
Defencemen	Tom Freeman	Winnipeg Rangers
Defencemen	Jim Woloshyn	Winnipeg Braves
Centreman	Ken Sucharski	Winnipeg Braves
Leftwinger	Glen Beckett	Winnipeg Rangers
Rightwinger	George Anderson	Winnipeg Braves
