= 1964–65 MJHL season =

Manitoba ice hockey season

Jimmy Dunn was hired as commissioner of the Manitoba Junior Hockey League (MJHL) in May 1964. The league had been reduced to four teams based in the Greater Winnipeg area after the withdrawal of the Brandon Wheat Kings and the Fort Frances Royals. The MJHL transitioned from a draft of players in the Greater Winnipeg Minor Hockey Association, into a system where each team chose players from a set geographic district. The new "zoning" arrangement was planned to be in effect for three seasons to stimulate more localized interest in junior hockey and aimed to keep teammates together from the minor hockey level to the junior hockey level. Dunn supported the change and noted that the concept had produced forward lines on previous Memorial Cup championship teams from Winnipeg. The Charlie Gardiner Memorial Trophy series was revived as a preseason tournament for the league's teams. Dunn reached an agreement to televise MJHL games on CJAY-TV, and the league experimented with playing games on Sunday evenings instead of afternoons to increase its attendance and avoid competing with televised football games. Dunn requested to the Canadian Amateur Hockey Association (CAHA) that the MJHL waive its bye into the Abbott Cup finals and its playoffs champion meet the Thunder Bay Junior A Hockey League champion in the first round. He felt that the loss of gate receipts from a bye was a financial hardship for the MJHL, and shorten the league's playoffs to accommodate the change approved by the CAHA.

== Champion ==
On March 31, 1965, at the Winnipeg Arena, the Winnipeg Braves captured the MJHL championship and Turnbull Memorial Trophy.

== League notes ==
Brandon Wheat Kings transfer to the Saskatchewan Junior Hockey League, and Fort Frances Royals transfer to the Thunder Bay Junior Hockey League.
The St. Boniface Canadiens change their name to the Winnipeg Warriors.
The League announced that the Manitoba - Saskatchewan all-star game has been cancelled.
League shortens 48 game schedule, no reason given.

== Regular season ==
| League Standings | GP | W | L | T | Pts | GF | GA |
|---|---|---|---|---|---|---|---|
| Winnipeg Braves | 44 | 26 | 13 | 5 | 57 | 184 | 140 |
| Winnipeg Rangers | 45 | 21 | 18 | 6 | 48 | 202 | 170 |
| Winnipeg Monarchs | 45 | 19 | 21 | 5 | 43 | 159 | 165 |
| Winnipeg Warriors | 44 | 13 | 27 | 4 | 30 | 152 | 222 |

== Playoffs ==
Semi-Finals

Rangers lost to Monarchs 3-games-to-2

Turnbull Cup Championship

Braves defeated Monarchs 4-games-to-none

Western Memorial Cup Semi-Final

Braves defeated Port Arthur North Stars (TBJHL) 4-games-to-1

Western Memorial Cup Final (Abbott Cup)

Braves lost to Edmonton Oil Kings (CAHL) 4-games-to-2

== Awards ==
| Trophy | Winner | Team |
|---|---|---|
| MVP | Wayne Stephenson | Winnipeg Braves |
| Top Goaltender | Wayne Stephenson | Winnipeg Braves |
| Rookie of the Year | Bill Ramsay | Winnipeg Monarchs |
| Sportsmanship Award | Bill Scott | Winnipeg Monarchs |
| Scoring Champion | Ken Sucharski | Winnipeg Rangers |
| Most Goals | Terry Jones | Winnipeg Rangers |

== All-Star teams ==
First All-Star Team
| Goaltender | Wayne Stephenson | Winnipeg Braves |
| Defencemen | Al Dylcer | Winnipeg Monarchs |
| Defencemen | Jim Lane | Winnipeg Rangers |
| Centreman | Ken Sucharski | Winnipeg Warriors |
| Leftwinger | Doug Overton | Winnipeg Warriors |
| Rightwinger | Bill Cooper | Winnipeg Warriors |
Second All-Star Team
| Goaltender | Gary Thornton | Winnipeg Warriors |
| Defencemen | Mike Kolody | Winnipeg Rangers |
| Defencemen | Brian Dyck | Winnipeg Braves |
| Centreman | Bill Heindl Jr. | Winnipeg Braves |
| Leftwinger | Dunc Rousseau | Winnipeg Braves |
| Rightwinger | George Anderson | Winnipeg Braves |
