= Marc Dufour =

Canadian ice hockey player

- Born: September 11, 1941 Trois-Rivières, Quebec, Canada
- Died: January 23, 2015 (aged 73) Trois-Rivières, Quebec, Canada
- Height: 6 ft 0 in (183 cm)
- Weight: 175 lb (79 kg; 12 st 7 lb)
- Position: Right wing
- Shot: Right
- Played for: New York Rangers; Los Angeles Kings
- Playing career: 1963–1975

Marc Carol Joseph Dufour (September 11, 1941 – January 23, 2015) was a Canadian ice hockey player. He played 14 games in the National Hockey League with the New York Rangers and Los Angeles Kings between 1963 and 1968. The rest of his career, which lasted from 1962 to 1975, was spent in the minor leagues. He died in January 2015, aged 73.

== Career statistics ==
=== Regular season and playoffs ===
			Regular season					Playoffs
Season	Team	League	GP	G	A	Pts	PIM	GP	G	A	Pts	PIM
1959–60	Guelph Biltmores	OHA	38	7	13	20	12	5	0	1	1	2
1960–61	Guelph Biltmores	OHA	4	0	0	0	0	—	—	—	—	—
1960–61	Trois-Rivieres Reds	QPJHL	—	—	—	—	—	10	8	10	18	6
1961–62	Brandon Wheat Kings	MJHL	33	37	20	57	48	9	9	8	17	12
1961–62	Edmonton Oil Kings	M-Cup	—	—	—	—	—	3	2	2	4	10
1961–62	Brandon Wheat Kings	M-Cup	—	—	—	—	—	11	10	6	16	20
1962–63	Sudbury Wolves	EPHL	71	50	49	99	27	8	2	7	9	4
1963–64	New York Rangers	NHL	10	1	0	1	2	—	—	—	—	—
1963–64	Baltimore Clippers	AHL	38	7	16	23	28	—	—	—	—	—
1963–64	Los Angeles Blades	WHL	12	2	3	5	0	6	1	0	1	0
1964–65	New York Rangers	NHL	2	0	0	0	0	—	—	—	—	—
1964–65	St. Paul Rangers	CPHL	69	43	50	93	33	11	4	14	18	21
1965–66	Baltimore Clippers	AHL	65	14	23	37	8	—	—	—	—	—
1966–67	Vancouver Canucks	WHL	70	19	17	36	18	8	1	1	2	2
1967–68	Springfield Kings	AHL	65	20	25	45	12	4	3	1	4	0
1968–69	Los Angeles Kings	NHL	2	0	0	0	0	—	—	—	—	—
1968–69	Springfield Kings	AHL	70	34	36	70	20	—	—	—	—	—
1969–70	Springfield Kings	AHL	71	32	53	85	22	14	2	6	8	4
1970–71	Baltimore Clippers	AHL	69	31	51	82	15	6	0	5	5	0
1971–72	Baltimore Clippers	AHL	59	15	36	51	12	18	7	6	13	8
1972–73	Baltimore Clippers	AHL	67	30	32	62	16	—	—	—	—	—
1973–74	Baltimore Clippers	AHL	74	42	62	104	21	9	4	3	7	2
1974–75	Baltimore Clippers	AHL	29	8	7	15	12	—	—	—	—	—
AHL totals			607	233	341	574	166	51	16	21	37	14
NHL totals			14	1	0	1	2	—	—	—	—	—

== Awards and achievements ==
- MJHL Goal Scoring Leader (1962)
- Turnbull Cup (MJHL Championship) (1962)
