= 1961–62 MJHL season =

Manitoba ice hockey season

On March 21, 1962, in Brandon, the Wheat Kings captured the Turnbull Memorial Trophy as MJHL champions.

== Regular season ==
| League Standings | GP | W | L | T | Pts | GF | GA |
|---|---|---|---|---|---|---|---|
| Brandon Wheat Kings | 40 | 26 | 12 | 2 | 54 | 238 | 137 |
| Winnipeg Monarchs | 40 | 20 | 16 | 4 | 44 | 143 | 138 |
| St. Boniface Canadiens | 40 | 17 | 17 | 6 | 40 | 135 | 152 |
| Winnipeg Rangers | 40 | 16 | 20 | 4 | 36 | 128 | 150 |
| Winnipeg Braves | 40 | 9 | 23 | 8 | 26 | 110 | 177 |

== All-Star game ==
The inaugural Manitoba - Saskatchewan all-star game was held in Winnipeg on January 21 before 7,044 fans. The MJHL scored a 6-2 triumph to win the Charlie Gardiner Memorial Trophy. Brandon stars Gerry Kell and Marc Dufour lead the attack with two goals each, Jim Johnson and Paul Allan added singles. Replying for the SJHL were Ron Willy and George Swarbrick.
MJHL Lineup:

- Goal: Henry Goy (St. Boniface); Rick Best (Braves)
- Defence: John Trojack (St. Boniface); Bob Peers (St. Boniface); Bob Woytowich (Rangers);
  Dennis Toyne (Rangers); Wayne Schultz (Braves)
- Centre: Gerry Kell (Brandon); Bob Stoyko (Rangers); Peter Stemkowski (Monarchs)
- Leftwing: Ted Taylor (Brandon); Paul Allan (St. Boniface); Terry Moore (Monarchs)
- Rightwing: Marc Dufour (Brandon); Jim Johnson (Rangers); Rick Brown (Brandon)
- Coach: Gord Pennell (Rangers); Manager: Jake Milford (Brandon)

Trojack did not play; replaced by Bob Ash (Brandon)

== Playoffs ==
Semi-Finals

Brandon defeated St. Boniface 3-games-to-1
Monarchs defeated Rangers 3-games-to-none

Turnbull Cup Championship

Brandon defeated Monarchs 4-games-to-1

Western Memorial Cup Semi-Final

Brandon defeated Port Arthur North Stars (TBJHL) 4-games-to-none

Western Memorial Cup Final (Abbott Cup)

Brandon lost to Edmonton Oil Kings (CAHL) 4-games-to-3

== Awards ==
| Trophy | Winner | Team |
|---|---|---|
| MVP | | |
| Top Goaltender | Gary McAlpine | Brandon Wheat Kings |
| Rookie of the Year | | |
| Scoring Champion | Gerry Kell | Brandon Wheat Kings |
| Most Goals | Marc Dufour | Brandon Wheat Kings |
