= 1958–59 WHL season =

- League: Western Hockey League
- Sport: Ice hockey
- Number of games: 70 (Coast Division); 64 (Prairie Division)
- Number of teams: 9

Regular season
- Season champions: Calgary Stampeders
- Season MVP: Coast Division: Guyle Fielder (Seattle); Prairie Division: Ed Dorohoy (Calgary)
- Top scorer: Guyle Fielder (Seattle)

President's Cup
- Champions: Seattle Totems
- Runners-up: Calgary Stampeders

Seasons
- ← 1957–58 1959–60 →

The 1958–59 WHL season was the seventh season of the Western Hockey League. The Seattle Totems were the President's Cup champions as they beat the Calgary Stampeders in four games in the final series.

The Spokane Spokes joined as an expansion club. Initially named the "Flyers" they were forced to modify their name after complaints from the Edmonton Flyers, who cited seniority. The Seattle franchise also changed names, going from the "Americans" to the "Totems". The teams played an unbalanced schedule: the Coast Division teams played 70 games each, while the Prairie Division teams had 64 each.

Guyle Fielder set a league record with 95 assists, winning the scoring title with 119 points. He was named the Coast Division's most valuable player, while Ed Dorohoy of the Calgary Stampeders, who scored 109 points, was named so for the Prairie Division.

== Teams ==
1958–59 Western Hockey League
| Division | Team | City | Arena | Capacity |
| Coast | New Westminster Royals | New Westminster, British Columbia | Queen's Park Arena | 3,500 |
| Coast | Seattle Totems | Seattle, Washington | Civic Ice Arena | 5,000 |
| Coast | Spokane Spokes | Spokane, Washington | Spokane Coliseum | 5,400 |
| Coast | Vancouver Canucks | Vancouver, British Columbia | PNE Forum | 5,050 |
| Coast | Victoria Cougars | Victoria, British Columbia | Victoria Memorial Arena | 5,000 |
| Prairie | Calgary Stampeders | Calgary, Alberta | Stampede Corral | 6,475 |
| Prairie | Edmonton Flyers | Edmonton, Alberta | Edmonton Stock Pavilion | 6,000 |
| Prairie | Saskatoon Quakers | Saskatoon, Saskatchewan | Saskatoon Arena | 3,304 |
| Prairie | Winnipeg Warriors | Winnipeg, Manitoba | Winnipeg Arena | 9,500 |

=== Map of teams ===
Coast Division Teams Prairie Division Teams

== Final standings ==
Coast Division Standings
| R | Team | GP | W | L | T | GF | GA | Pts |
|---|---|---|---|---|---|---|---|---|
| **1** | **Seattle Totems** | **70** | **40** | **27** | **3** | **277** | **225** | **83** |
| **2** | **Vancouver Canucks** | **70** | **31** | **28** | **11** | **219** | **214** | **73** |
| **3** | **Victoria Cougars** | **70** | **30** | **36** | **4** | **219** | **254** | **64** |
| **4** | **Spokane Spokes** | **70** | **26** | **38** | **6** | **217** | **275** | **58** |
| 5 | New Westminster Royals | 70 | 23 | 45 | 2 | 237 | 301 | 48 |

Prairie Division Standings
| R | Team | GP | W | L | T | GF | GA | Pts |
|---|---|---|---|---|---|---|---|---|
| **1** | **Calgary Stampeders** | **64** | **42** | **21** | **1** | **263** | **196** | **85** |
| **2** | **Edmonton Flyers** | **64** | **33** | **28** | **3** | **205** | **206** | **69** |
| **3** | **Winnipeg Warriors** | **64** | **31** | **31** | **2** | **256** | **229** | **64** |
| 4 | Saskatoon Quakers | 64 | 29 | 31 | 4 | 208 | 201 | 62 |

bold - qualified for playoffs

== Playoffs ==
Preliminary Round
Seattle Totems | 3
Victoria Cougars | 0
Vancouver Canucks | 3
Spokane Spokes | 1
Calgary Stampeders | –
(First-round bye) | –
Winnipeg Warriors | 3
Edmonton Flyers | 0

Semifinals
Seattle Totems | 4
Vancouver Canucks | 1
Calgary Stampeders | 4
Winnipeg Warriors | 0

Finals
Seattle Totems | 4
Calgary Stampeders | 0

The Seattle Totems defeated the Calgary Stampeders 4 games to 0 to win the President's Cup.

== Bibliography ==
- Stott, Jon C. (2008), Ice Warriors: The Pacific Coast/Western Hockey League 1948–1974, Surrey, British Columbia: Heritage House Publishing, ISBN 978-1-894974-54-7
