= Tom Williams (ice hockey, born 1951) =

Canadian ice hockey player

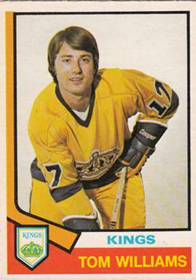
- Williams in 1974 card
- Born: February 7, 1951 (age 75) Windsor, Ontario, Canada
- Height: 5 ft 11 in (180 cm)
- Weight: 187 lb (85 kg; 13 st 5 lb)
- Position: Left wing
- Shot: Right
- Played for: New York Rangers; Los Angeles Kings
- NHL draft: 27th overall, 1971; New York Rangers
- Playing career: 1971–1980

Thomas Charles Williams (born February 7, 1951) is a Canadian former ice hockey player who played in the National Hockey League with the New York Rangers and Los Angeles Kings from 1972 to 1979.

== Career ==
Williams was chosen by the New York Rangers in the second round of the 1971 NHL Amateur Draft, 27th overall. He played for the Rangers from 1971–72 through early in the 1973–74 season, when he was traded to the Los Angeles Kings on November 30. His best season came in 1976–77 when he scored 35 goals along with 39 assists. He was traded to the St. Louis Blues following the 1978–79 season, but his only action following the trade was a short stint with the Salt Lake Golden Eagles in the CHL. He retired with career totals of 115 goals and 138 assists in 399 NHL games.

== Career statistics ==
=== Regular season and playoffs ===
			Regular season					Playoffs
Season	Team	League	GP	G	A	Pts	PIM	GP	G	A	Pts	PIM
1968–69	Hamilton Red Wings	OHA	54	21	29	50	18	5	0	1	1	0
1969–70	Hamilton Red Wings	OHA	54	23	27	50	17	—	—	—	—	—
1970–71	Hamilton Red Wings	OHA	59	43	26	69	8	7	1	2	3	0
1971–72	New York Rangers	NHL	3	0	0	0	2	—	—	—	—	—
1971–72	Omaha Knights	CHL	67	30	34	64	4	—	—	—	—	—
1972–73	New York Rangers	NHL	8	0	1	1	0	—	—	—	—	—
1972–73	Providence Reds	AHL	50	20	27	47	9	3	1	2	3	0
1973–74	New York Rangers	NHL	14	1	2	3	4	—	—	—	—	—
1973–74	Los Angeles Kings	NHL	46	11	17	28	6	5	3	1	4	0
1974–75	Los Angeles Kings	NHL	74	24	22	46	16	3	0	0	0	0
1975–76	Los Angeles Kings	NHL	70	19	20	39	14	9	2	2	4	2
1976–77	Los Angeles Kings	NHL	80	35	39	74	14	9	3	4	7	2
1977–78	Los Angeles Kings	NHL	58	15	22	37	9	2	0	0	0	0
1977–78	Springfield Indians	AHL	7	6	3	9	13	—	—	—	—	—
1978–79	Los Angeles Kings	NHL	44	10	15	25	8	1	0	0	0	0
1979–80	Salt Lake Golden Eagles	CHL	11	1	3	4	0	—	—	—	—	—
NHL totals			397	115	138	253	73	29	8	7	15	4
