= Gord Pennell =

Canadian ice hockey player (1929–2015)

- Born: January 13, 1929 Winnipeg, Manitoba, Canada
- Died: September 13, 2015 (aged 86) Winnipeg, Manitoba, Canada
- Height: 6 ft 1 in (185 cm)
- Weight: 150 lb (68 kg; 10 st 10 lb)
- Position: Centre
- Shot: Right
- Played for: Buffalo Bisons
- Playing career: 1946–1960

Gordon Pennell (January 13, 1929 – September 13, 2015) was a Canadian professional hockey player who played 383 games for the Buffalo Bisons in the American Hockey League.

He was named to the Manitoba Hockey Hall of Fame in 2005.

Born in Winnipeg, Manitoba, Pennell played for the St. James and Winnipeg Canadians of the MJHL in 1947 and 1948.

He next played his last junior season with the OHA Junior A Barrie Flyers, scoring 30 goals & 67 points in only 46 games. He also had 6 goals in 8 games in the 1949 Memorial Cup playdowns.

Signed by the powerhouse Montreal Canadiens organisation, Pennell turned pro with the AHL Buffalo Bisons for the 1949-1950 campaign.

Pennell played in the first AHL All-Star game on October 27, 1954. He suffered from a broken leg. After 7 seasons with Buffalo. he finished his professional career with the Vancouver Canucks of the Western Hockey League.

After retiring at age 28, Gord began his long coaching career in 1959 with MJHL Winnipeg Rangers. In 1961 led his club to the Western Canada final and the Charlie Gardiner Memorial Trophy in 1967.

He also coached the WHL Winnipeg Clubs and the St James Canadians & St Boniface Saints over several seasons in the MJHL, helping many players to the NHL & WHA. He finished his coaching career by coaching his son Grant to a provincial Manitoba Minor Midget Championship. Gord was also a member of the Winnipeg Club Oldtimer hockey team that went to the Soviet Union to play against the former USSR oldtimers in 1983.

== Awards & achievements ==
- MJHL Goal Scoring Leader (1948)
- Ontario Hockey Association Junior A Champion (1949)
- Played in inaugural American Hockey League All-Star game (1954)
- Ontario-Minnesota Hockey League Scoring Champion (1958 & 1959)
- Ontario-Minnesota Hockey League First All-Star Team (1958 & 1959)
- Ontario-Minnesota Hockey League Championship (1958 & 1959)
- Turnbull Cup, Manitoba Junior Hockey League Championship (1961)
- Coached in MJHL / SJHL All-Star Game (1962)
- MJHL All-Star Team Coach (1962)
- Inducted into Manitoba Hockey Hall of Fame (2007)
