= Terry Jones (ice hockey) =

Canadian ice hockey player

- Born: August 31, 1946 (age 80) Winnipeg, Manitoba, Canada
- Height: 5 ft 9 in (175 cm)
- Weight: 170 lb (77 kg; 12 st 2 lb)
- Position: Centre
- Played for: Winnipeg Rangers (MJHL); New Haven Blades (EHL); Nelson Maple Leafs (WIHL); Trail Smoke Eaters (WIHL)
- NHL draft: 10th overall, 1963; New York Rangers
- Playing career: 1967–1975

Terry Jones (born August 31, 1946) is a Canadian retired professional ice hockey player.

== Career ==
Jones was selected by the New York Rangers in the second round (tenth overall) of the 1963 NHL amateur draft. Although he never played in the National Hockey League, he went pro in the Eastern Hockey League with the New Haven Blades, and in the Western International Hockey League with the Nelson Maple Leafs and Trail Smoke Eaters.

== Awards and honours ==
Award	Year
Mike Ridley Trophy - MJHL Leading Scorer	1965–66
