= Knoxville Knights =

Semi-professional minor league ice hockey team

The Knoxville Knights were a semi-professional minor league ice hockey team based in the James White Civic Coliseum in Knoxville, Tennessee. The Knights played for seven seasons in the Eastern Hockey League from 1961 to 1968. The Knights folded at the end of the 1967–68 season. In December 1963, the Knights played against the Soviet Union men's national ice hockey team tying the game 4–4.

The Knights had the distinction of having the youngest player in EHL history appear in a game during their existence. On March 13, 1966 in a game against the Jacksonville Rockets, Knights head coach Doug Bentley inserted his son Doug, Jr. into the lineup after a rash of injuries hit the team a few days before. Doug, Jr, was born June 1, 1951, making him 14 years of age at the time of his Knights debut.

== Notable players ==
Notable players include several who played in the National Hockey League:

- Gene Achtymichuk
- Glen Cressman
- Ray Cullen
- Claude Cyr
- Ed Dorohoy
- Marv Edwards
- Harrison Gray
- Earl Heiskala
- Dennis Hextall
- Jack LeClair
- Jack Martin
- Jim Murray
- Pat Quinn
- Bill Speer
- Guy Trottier

== Season-by-season results ==
Knoxville Knights season standings:

Season	Games	Won	Lost	Tied	Points	Goals For	Goals Against
1961–62	68	30	35	3	63	216	256
1962–63	68	37	28	3	77	295	245
1963–64	72	40	31	1	81	340	287
1964–65	72	34	36	2	70	281	284
1965–66	72	34	36	2	70	278	261
1966–67	72	27	42	3	57	232	268
1967–68	72	23	43	6	52	250	294
