= Ed Dorohoy =

Canadian ice hockey player

- Ed Dorohoy
- Born: March 13, 1929; Medicine Hat, Alberta, Canada
- Died: May 28, 2009 (aged 80); Vancouver, British Columbia, Canada
- Height: 5 ft 9 in (175 cm)
- Weight: 150 lb (68 kg; 10 st 10 lb)
- Position: Centre
- Shot: Left
- Played for: Montreal Canadiens
- Playing career: 1948–1965

Edward Eli "Eddie" Dorohoy (March 13, 1929 – May 28, 2009) was a Canadian ice hockey centre. He played in 16 games for the Montreal Canadiens in 1948–49 season and scored no points. The rest of his career, which lasted from 1948 to 1965, was spent in the minor leagues. He was born in Medicine Hat, Alberta.

He left behind his wife, Shirley, four children, eight grandchildren, and four great-grandchildren.

== Career statistics ==
=== Regular season and playoffs ===
			Regular season					Playoffs
Season	Team	League	GP	G	A	Pts	PIM	GP	G	A	Pts	PIM
1946–47	Lethbridge Native Sons	AJHL	11	2	1	3	4	4	2	0	2	0
1947–48	Lethbridge Native Sons	AJHL	27	32	49	81	22	6	6	15	21	9
1947–48	Lethbridge Native Sons	M-Cup	—	—	—	—	—	11	4	7	11	6
1948–49	Montreal Canadiens	NHL	16	0	0	0	0	—	—	—	—	—
1948–49	Dallas Texans	USHL	34	19	21	40	76	4	2	2	4	0
1949–50	Cincinnati Mohawks	AHL	6	0	0	0	0	—	—	—	—	—
1949–50	Vancouver Canucks	PCHL	31	15	16	31	25	—	—	—	—	—
1950–51	Vancouver Canucks	PCHL	68	29	58	87	64	12	6	8	14	8
1951–52	Vancouver Canucks	PCHL	68	29	56	85	66	13	3	4	7	12
1952–53	Vancouver Canucks	WHL	70	24	54	78	97	—	—	—	—	—
1953–54	Vancouver Canucks	WHL	70	26	53	79	46	5	1	2	3	4
1954–55	Vancouver Canucks	WHL	68	33	52	85	41	5	2	2	4	10
1955–56	Seattle Americans	WHL	69	18	41	59	131	—	—	—	—	—
1956–57	Seattle Americans	WHL	70	31	55	86	70	6	2	6	8	4
1957–58	Vancouver Canucks	WHL	58	34	41	75	51	—	—	—	—	—
1958–59	Calgary Stampeders	WHL	64	35	74	109	56	8	2	4	6	6
1959–60	Vancouver Canucks	WHL	33	17	21	38	30	—	—	—	—	—
1960–61	Vancouver Canucks	WHL	2	0	0	0	0	—	—	—	—	—
1961–62	Los Angeles Blades/Vancouver Canucks	WHL	37	6	10	16	14	—	—	—	—	—
1962–63	Vancouver Canucks	WHL	6	0	2	2	0	—	—	—	—	—
1962–63	Knoxville Knights	EHL	20	7	20	27	2	5	1	2	3	0
1963–64	New Haven Blades	EHL	18	11	18	29	6	5	2	3	5	2
1964–65	Spokane Jets	WIHL	47	20	50	70	118	3	0	2	2	12
WHL totals			547	224	403	627	536	24	7	14	21	24
NHL totals			16	0	0	0	6	—	—	—	—	—

== Awards and achievements ==
- MJHL First All-Star Team Coach (1967)
