= Cal Swenson =

Canadian ice hockey player

- Born: April 16, 1948 Watson, Saskatchewan, Canada
- Died: January 1, 2014 (aged 65) Stony Plain, Alberta, Canada
- Height: 5 ft 8 in (173 cm)
- Weight: 175 lb (79 kg; 12 st 7 lb)
- Position: forward
- Shot: Left
- Played for: Jacksonville Barons; Syracuse Eagles; Tulsa Oilers; Winnipeg Jets
- Playing career: 1967–1975

Calvin Berle Swenson (April 16, 1948 – January 1, 2014) was a Canadian professional ice hockey forward.

== Early life ==
Swenson was born in Watson, Saskatchewan.

== Playing career ==
Swenson played 102 games in the World Hockey Association with the Winnipeg Jets.

== Death ==
Swenson died suddenly on January 1, 2014, aged 65.

== Career statistics ==
=== Regular season and playoffs ===
			Regular season					Playoffs
Season	Team	League	GP	G	A	Pts	PIM	GP	G	A	Pts	PIM
1966–67	Brandon Wheat Kings	MJHL	––	43	55	98	86
1967–68	Brandon Wheat Kings	WCJHL	16	9	9	18	33	––	––	––	––	––
1967–68	Flin Flon Bombers	WCJHL	36	35	38	73	87	––	––	––	––	––
1968–69	Tulsa Oilers	CHL	63	11	20	31	43	7	0	3	3	11
1969–70	Tulsa Oilers	CHL	60	18	24	42	59	6	1	2	3	4
1970–71	Tulsa Oilers	CHL	72	27	46	73	45	––	––	––	––	––
1971–72	Tulsa Oilers	CHL	66	35	46	81	80	13	4	7	11	19
1972–73	Winnipeg Jets	WHA	77	7	21	28	19	14	1	5	6	7
1973–74	Jacksonville Barons	AHL	35	13	15	28	27	––	––	––	––	––
1973–74	Winnipeg Jets	WHA	25	5	4	9	2	1	0	0	0	0
1974–75	Syracuse Eagles	AHL	68	27	34	61	31	1	0	0	0	0
WHA totals			102	12	25	37	21	15	1	5	6	7

== Awards and achievements ==
- MJHL First All-Star Team (1967)
- WCJHL Second All-Star Team (1968)
- In 1970, he scored the fastest hat trick in the Central Hockey League's history, in 1 minute, 44 seconds.
