= Fort Frances Royals =

Manitoba former ice hockey team

- City: Fort Frances, Ontario
- League: Thunder Bay Junior A Hockey League; Manitoba Junior Hockey League
- Operated: 1963-1971
- Home arena: Fort Frances Arena
- Colours: Orange, Black, and White
- Head coach: Glen Witherspoon

The Fort Frances Royals were a Junior ice hockey club from Fort Frances, Ontario, Canada. The Royals were members of the Memorial Cup-eligible Thunder Bay Junior A Hockey League.

== History ==
The Fort Frances Royals were founded in 1963 as members of the Manitoba Junior Hockey League. After a season playing against all Manitoba opponents, the Royals elected to transfer to the Thunder Bay Junior A Hockey League. They were the first team in decades to play in the TBJHL without existing within what would eventually become the City of Thunder Bay.

The Royals folded mid-season in 1969 after a terrible start to the season. Up to this point, the Royals were a force to reckon with in the TBJHL despite never winning a league title.

In 1970-71, the Royals entered the 1971 Centennial Cup playdowns as an independent team. They were defeated 3-games-to-none by the Thunder Bay Marrs in the Northwestern Ontario final.

== Season-by-season standings ==
Season	GP	W	L	T	OTL	GF	GA	P	Results
1963-64	30	17	12	1	-	118	136	35	2nd MJHL
1964-65	22	8	10	4	-	105	108	20	3rd TBJHL
1965-66	30	11	19	0	-	145	173	22	3rd TBJHL
1966-67	28	9	16	3	-	120	170	21	3rd TBJHL
1967-68	24	14	6	4	-	141	120	48	1st TBJHL
1968-69	24	1	23	0	-	78	200	2	4th TBJHL

== Notable alumni ==
- Danny Johnson
