= Bob Ash =

Canadian ice hockey player (born 1943)

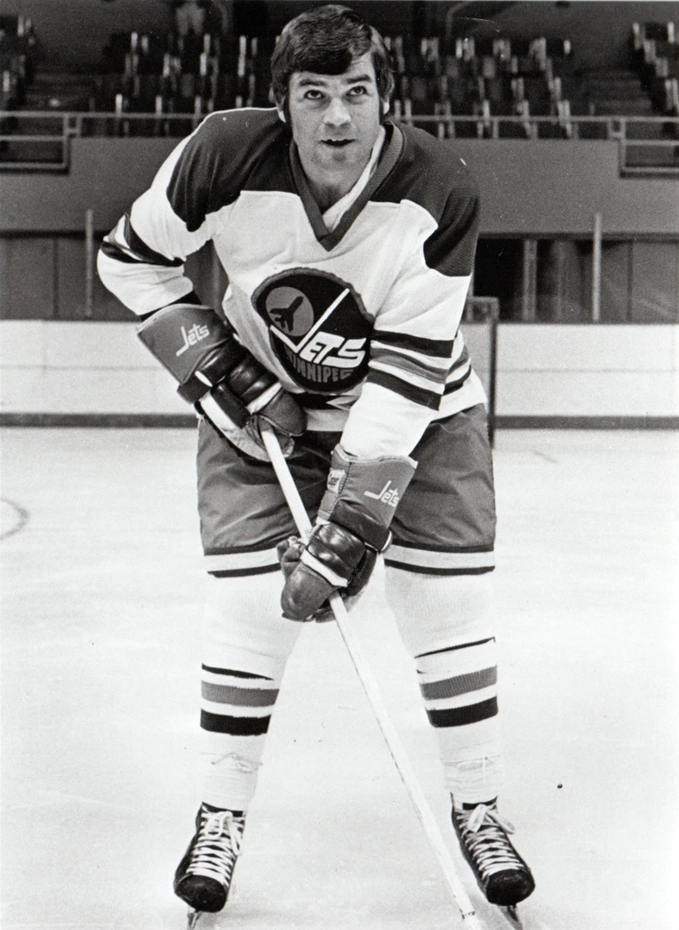
- Ash in 1973 photo
- Born: September 29, 1943 (age 82) Broadview, Saskatchewan, Canada
- Height: 5 ft 9 in (175 cm)
- Weight: 170 lb (77 kg; 12 st 2 lb)
- Position: Defence
- Shot: Left
- Played for: Winnipeg Jets (WHA); Indianapolis Racers (WHA)
- National team: Canada
- NHL draft: Undrafted
- Playing career: 1964–1975

Robert John Ash (born September 29, 1943) is a Canadian former professional ice hockey defenceman. He played 200 games in the World Hockey Association with the Winnipeg Jets and Indianapolis Racers, scoring six goals and 46 assists.

== Career statistics ==
=== Regular season and playoffs ===
			Regular season					Playoffs
Season	Team	League	GP	G	A	Pts	PIM	GP	G	A	Pts	PIM
1961–62	Brandon Wheat Kings	MJHL	40	6	19	25	0	—	—	—	—	—
1962–63	Brandon Wheat Kings	MJHL	Statistics Unavailable
1963–64	Brandon Wheat Kings	MJHL	29	6	25	31	21	—	—	—	—	—
1964–65	St. Paul Rangers	CPHL	69	3	5	8	28	11	2	0	2	11
1965–66	Minnesota Rangers	CPHL	70	5	17	22	47	4	0	2	2	2
1966–67	Omaha Knights	CPHL	70	2	16	18	42	12	0	5	5	2
1967–68	Buffalo Bisons	AHL	67	5	11	16	80	5	1	3	4	19
1968–69	Buffalo Bisons	AHL	65	1	12	13	74	6	0	1	1	4
1969–70	Buffalo Bisons	AHL	71	0	21	21	43	14	1	8	9	8
1970–71	Omaha Knights	CHL	9	1	1	2	4	8	2	2	4	13
1970–71	Seattle Totems	WHL	46	5	12	17	26	—	—	—	—	—
1971–72	Providence Reds	AHL	3	0	0	0	0	—	—	—	—	—
1971–72	Omaha Knights	CHL	64	5	26	31	66	—	—	—	—	—
1972–73	Winnipeg Jets	WHA	76	3	14	17	39	13	1	3	4	4
1973–74	Winnipeg Jets	WHA	60	2	18	20	30	4	0	1	1	2
1974–75	Indianapolis Racers	WHA	64	1	14	15	19	—	—	—	—	—
WHA totals			200	6	46	52	88	17	1	4	5	6

== Awards and achievements ==
- MJHL First All-Star Team (1964)
- Turnbull Cup MJHL Championship (1962, 1963, & 1964)
