= 1976–77 NHL season =

National Hockey League season

- League: National Hockey League
- Sport: Ice hockey
- Duration: October 5, 1976 – May 14, 1977
- Games: 80
- Teams: 18
- TV partner(s): CBC, SRC (Canada); NHL Network (United States)

Draft
- Top draft pick: Rick Green
- Picked by: Washington Capitals

Regular season
- Season champions: Montreal Canadiens
- Season MVP: Guy Lafleur (Canadiens)
- Top scorer: Guy Lafleur (Canadiens)

Playoffs
- Playoffs MVP: Guy Lafleur (Canadiens)

Stanley Cup
- Champions: Montreal Canadiens
- Runners-up: Boston Bruins

NHL seasons
- 1975–76 1977–78

The 1976–77 NHL season was the 60th season of the National Hockey League. The Kansas City Scouts moved to Denver, Colorado, and became the Colorado Rockies and the California Golden Seals moved to Cleveland, Ohio, and became the Cleveland Barons. The Montreal Canadiens once again dominated the playoffs as, for the second straight year, they swept their opponent four games to none in the final series for the Stanley Cup.

== League business ==
Two teams relocated: The Kansas City Scouts moved to Denver, Colorado, and became the Colorado Rockies and the California Golden Seals moved to Cleveland, Ohio, and became the Cleveland Barons. These were the first franchise moves since the original Ottawa Senators had relocated in 1934 to become the St. Louis Eagles. Instability and the poor performances of the Washington Capitals and the Scouts since the 1974 expansion caused the league to shelve an expansion to Denver and Seattle that had been proposed for this season. Seattle would not have a team until the expansion Seattle Kraken in the 2021–22 season.

The 1976 NHL amateur draft was held on June 1, at the NHL offices in Montreal, Quebec. Rick Green was selected first overall by the Washington Capitals.

This season was Clarence Campbell's last as NHL President before he was succeeded by John Ziegler.

== Arena changes ==
- The relocated Cleveland Barons moved from the Oakland Coliseum Arena to Cleveland's Richfield Coliseum.
- The relocated Colorado Rockies moved from Kemper Arena in Kansas City, Missouri to McNichols Sports Arena in Denver, Colorado.

== Regular season ==
The previous season saw the Montreal Canadiens set new records in wins and points. Both of those records were broken again by the Canadiens this season as, with the highest points percentage in post-expansion NHL history (.825), they had 60 wins and 132 points. Their home record was 33 wins, 1 loss, and 6 ties. Scoring 216 more goals than they allowed, the Canadiens were a full 20 points ahead of the second-place Philadelphia Flyers. The Flyers, however, were swept in four straight games by the third-place Boston Bruins in the semi-finals. The Bruins were in turn swept by the Canadiens in four straight in the finals.

On February 2, 1977, during a game against the Detroit Red Wings, Toronto Maple Leafs defenceman Ian Turnbull became the first player in NHL history to score five goals on five shots.

=== Final standings ===
==== Prince of Wales Conference ====
Adams Division
	GP	W	L	T	GF	GA	Pts
Boston Bruins	80	49	23	8	312	240	106
Buffalo Sabres	80	48	24	8	301	220	104
Toronto Maple Leafs	80	33	32	15	301	285	81
Cleveland Barons	80	25	42	13	240	292	63

Norris Division
	GP	W	L	T	GF	GA	Pts
Montreal Canadiens	80	60	8	12	387	171	132
Los Angeles Kings	80	34	31	15	271	241	83
Pittsburgh Penguins	80	34	33	13	240	252	81
Washington Capitals	80	24	42	14	221	307	62
Detroit Red Wings	80	16	55	9	183	309	41

==== Clarence Campbell Conference ====
Patrick Division
	GP	W	L	T	GF	GA	Pts
Philadelphia Flyers	80	48	16	16	323	213	112
New York Islanders	80	47	21	12	288	193	106
Atlanta Flames	80	34	34	12	264	265	80
New York Rangers	80	29	37	14	272	310	72

Smythe Division
	GP	W	L	T	GF	GA	Pts
St. Louis Blues	80	32	39	9	239	276	73
Minnesota North Stars	80	23	39	18	240	310	64
Chicago Black Hawks	80	26	43	11	240	298	63
Vancouver Canucks	80	25	42	13	235	294	63
Colorado Rockies	80	20	46	14	226	307	54

== Playoffs ==
The New York Islanders won six consecutive games before the semifinal and were the only team from the preliminary round to make it to the semifinals, where they lost to the first-ranked, defending, and eventual Stanley Cup champion Montreal Canadiens. The Canadiens swept the St. Louis Blues and dispatched the Islanders in six to reach the final. The losses to the Islanders were the Canadiens' only losses of their playoff run. Second-ranked Philadelphia Flyers defeated the Toronto Maple Leafs in the quarterfinals, before being swept by the third-ranked Boston Bruins in the semifinals.

=== Playoff seeds ===
The top three teams in each division made the playoffs. All 12 clubs then were seeded 1–12 based on regular season points, regardless of conference or division.

Note: Only teams that qualified for the playoffs are listed here.

1. Montreal Canadiens, Norris Division champions, Prince of Wales Conference regular season champions – 132 points
2. Philadelphia Flyers, Patrick Division champions, Clarence Campbell Conference regular season champions – 112 points
3. Boston Bruins, Adams Division champions – 106 points (49 wins)
4. New York Islanders – 106 points (47 wins)
5. Buffalo Sabres – 104 points
6. Los Angeles Kings – 83 points
7. Pittsburgh Penguins – 81 points (34 wins)
8. Toronto Maple Leafs – 81 points (33 wins)
9. Atlanta Flames – 80 points
10. St. Louis Blues, Smythe Division champions – 73 points
11. Minnesota North Stars – 64 points
12. Chicago Black Hawks – 63 points

=== Playoff bracket ===
The NHL used "re-seeding" instead of a fixed bracket playoff system: in each round, the highest remaining seed was matched against the lowest remaining seed, the second-highest remaining seed played the second-lowest remaining seed, and so forth.

Regardless of playoff seed, all four division winners received a bye to the Quarterfinals, including this season's 10th overall seeded Smythe Division champion St. Louis Blues.

Each series in the Preliminary Round was played in a best-of-three format while each series in the other three rounds were played in a best-of-seven format (scores in the bracket indicate the number of games won in each series).

Preliminary round
1	NY Islanders	2
8	Chicago	0
2	Buffalo	2
7	Minnesota	0
4	Pittsburgh	1
5	Toronto	2
3	Los Angeles	2
6	Atlanta	1

Quarterfinals
1	Montreal	4
8	St. Louis	0
4	NY Islanders	4
5	Buffalo	0
2	Philadelphia	4
7	Toronto	2
3	Boston	4
6	Los Angeles	2

Semifinals
1	Montreal	4
4	NY Islanders	2
2	Philadelphia	0
3	Boston	4

Stanley Cup Finals
1	Montreal	4
3	Boston	0

=== Preliminary round ===
==== (1) New York Islanders vs. (8) Chicago Black Hawks ====
This was the first playoff series meeting between these two teams. The Black Hawks were originally scheduled as the home team for the second game, but its home rink Chicago Stadium had already been booked that night for the second of three Led Zeppelin concerts.

April 5	Chicago Black Hawks	2–5	New York Islanders	Nassau Coliseum	Recap
Grant Mulvey (1) – pp – 15:22		First period	No scoring
Kirk Bowman (1) – pp – 08:24		Second period	02:31 – J.P. Parise (1)
No scoring		Third period	03:18 – pp – Denis Potvin (1); 04:53 – Billy MacMillan (1); 11:56 – Bob Bourne (1); 19:22 – en – J.P. Parise (2)
Tony Esposito 32 saves / 37 shots		Goalie stats	Billy Smith 14 saves / 16 shots

April 7	Chicago Black Hawks	1–2	New York Islanders	Nassau Coliseum	Recap
Dennis Hull (1) – pp – 11:12		First period	13:56 – Jude Drouin (1)
No scoring		Second period	14:18 – Clark Gillies (1)
No scoring		Third period	No scoring
Tony Esposito 33 saves / 35 shots		Goalie stats	Billy Smith 18 saves / 19 shots

New York won series 2–0

==== (2) Buffalo Sabres vs. (7) Minnesota North Stars ====
This was the first playoff series meeting between these two teams.

April 5	Minnesota North Stars	2–4	Buffalo Sabres	Buffalo Memorial Auditorium	Recap
Roland Eriksson (1) – 02:08		First period	02:55 – Rene Robert (1)
Tim Young (1) – 7:35		Second period	02:47 – Jim Lorentz (1); 04:35 – Jerry Korab (1)
No scoring		Third period	19:55 – en – Rene Robert (2)
Pete LoPresti 37 saves / 41 shots		Goalie stats	Don Edwards 23 saves / 25 shots

April 7	Buffalo Sabres	7–1	Minnesota North Stars	Met Center	Recap
Jim Lorentz (2) – 04:33; Rick Martin (1) – 16:11; Jim Lorentz (3) – 17:07		First period	10:07 – Doug Hicks (1)
Gary McAdam (1) – 16:36; Jocelyn Guevremont (1) – 17:55		Second period	No scoring
Jocelyn Guevremont (2) – pp – 02:09; Jim Lorentz (4) – 15:28		Third period	No scoring
Don Edwards 24 saves / 25 shots		Goalie stats	Pete LoPresti 5 saves / 8 shots Gary Smith 11 saves / 15 shots

Buffalo won series 2–0

==== (3) Los Angeles Kings vs. (6) Atlanta Flames ====
This was the second playoff series meeting between these two teams. This was a rematch of last year's preliminary round, in which Los Angeles won in a two-game sweep.

April 5	Atlanta Flames	2–5	Los Angeles Kings	The Forum	Recap
Guy Chouinard (1) – pp – 04:07		First period	00:23 – Glenn Goldup (1); 10:33 – pp – Mike Murphy (1); 17:38 – pp – Butch Goring (1)
Willi Plett (1) – 08:06		Second period	14:04 – Don Kozak (1)
No scoring		Third period	17:57 – Glenn Goldup (2)
Dan Bouchard 20 saves / 25 shots		Goalie stats	Rogie Vachon 20 saves / 22 shots

April 7	Los Angeles Kings	2–3	Atlanta Flames	Omni Coliseum	Recap
Marcel Dionne (1) – 15:30		First period	15:14 – Guy Chouinard (2); 16:52 – Curt Bennett (1)
Don Kozak (2) – pp – 15:13		Second period	08:47 – Eric Vail (1)
No scoring		Third period	No scoring
Rogie Vachon 31 saves / 34 shots		Goalie stats	Phil Myre 22 saves / 24 shots

April 9	Atlanta Flames	2–4	Los Angeles Kings	The Forum	Recap
Bill Clement (1) – sh – 14:58		First period	03:47 – Butch Goring (2); 05:52 – Marcel Dionne (2)
No scoring		Second period	03:06 – Butch Goring (3)
Tom Lysiak (1) – pp – 05:05		Third period	19:59 – en – Butch Goring (4)
Phil Myre 19 saves / 22 shots		Goalie stats	Rogie Vachon 25 saves / 27 shots

Los Angeles won series 2–1

==== (4) Pittsburgh Penguins vs. (5) Toronto Maple Leafs ====
This was the second playoff series meeting between these two teams. This was a rematch of last year's preliminary round, in which Toronto won the series 2–1.

April 5	Toronto Maple Leafs	4–2	Pittsburgh Penguins	Civic Arena	Recap
No scoring		First period	13:25 – Bob Kelly (1)
Don Ashby (1) – 04:12; Lanny McDonald (1) – 12:11		Second period	No scoring
Tiger Williams (1) – 10:32; Darryl Sittler (1) – en – 19:52		Third period	18:34 – pp – Mario Faubert (1)
Wayne Thomas 29 saves / 31 shots		Goalie stats	Denis Herron 29 saves / 32 shots

April 7	Pittsburgh Penguins	6–4	Toronto Maple Leafs	Maple Leaf Gardens	Recap
Jean Pronovost (1) – 01:01; Ron Stackhouse (1) – 06:37; Syl Apps Jr. (1) – pp – 12:30		First period	No scoring
Lowell MacDonald (1) – 07:38		Second period	06:10 – pp – Darryl Sittler (2); 12:38 – Stan Weir (1)
Greg Malone (1) – 13:57; Ron Stackhouse (2) – en – 19:23		Third period	03:37 – pp – Ian Turnbull (1); 07:52 – Borje Salming (1)
Denis Herron 37 saves / 41 shots		Goalie stats	Wayne Thomas 28 saves / 33 shots

April 9	Toronto Maple Leafs	5–2	Pittsburgh Penguins	Civic Arena	Recap
Borje Salming (2) – pp – 08:34; Ian Turnbull (2) – pp – 14:14		First period	19:40 – pp – Jean Pronovost (2)
Lanny McDonald (2) – 08:46; Lanny McDonald (3) – 14:17		Second period	16:06 – Blair Chapman (1)
Lanny McDonald (4) – en – 19:44		Third period	No scoring
Mike Palmateer 38 saves / 40 shots		Goalie stats	Denis Herron 37 saves / 41 shots

Toronto won series 2–1

=== Quarterfinals ===
==== (1) Montreal Canadiens vs. (8) St. Louis Blues ====
This was the third, and as of today, most recent, playoff series meeting between the two teams. Montreal won both previous meetings in four-game sweeps in both the 1968 & 1969 Stanley Cup Finals.

April 11	St. Louis Blues	2–7	Montreal Canadiens	Montreal Forum	Recap
Bernie Federko (1) – 18:38		First period	00:51 – Guy Lafleur (1); 07:54 – pp – Larry Robinson (1); 16:30 – Guy Lafleur (2); 19:35 – Jacques Lemaire (1)
No scoring		Second period	11:27 – Guy Lafleur (3); 14:33 – pp – Guy Lapointe (1)
Brian Sutter (1) – 12:32		Third period	02:23 – Bill Nyrop (1)
Ed Staniowski 26 saves / 32 shots Eddie Johnston 9 saves / 10 shots		Goalie stats	Ken Dryden 18 saves / 20 shots

April 13	St. Louis Blues	0–3	Montreal Canadiens	Montreal Forum	Recap
No scoring		First period	06:15 – Steve Shutt (1); 13:19 – Bob Gainey (1)
No scoring		Second period	18:01 – Guy Lafleur (4)
No scoring		Third period	No scoring
Eddie Johnston 38 saves / 41 shots Ed Staniowski 0 saves / 0 shots		Goalie stats	Ken Dryden 23 saves / 23 shots

April 16	Montreal Canadiens	5–1	St. Louis Blues	St. Louis Arena	Recap
Serge Savard (1) – pp – 02:57; Serge Savard (2) – 19:45		First period	No scoring
No scoring		Second period	No scoring
Steve Shutt (2) – 01:35; Rick Chartraw (1) – 08:46; Jacques Lemaire (2) – 13:10		Third period	16:50 – Claude Larose (1)
Ken Dryden 36 saves / 37 shots		Goalie stats	Eddie Johnston 30 saves / 35 shots

April 17	Montreal Canadiens	4–1	St. Louis Blues	St. Louis Arena	Recap
Steve Shutt (3) – pp – 18:21		First period	No scoring
No scoring		Second period	02:46 – Larry Patey (1)
Guy Lafleur (5) – 02:34; Peter Mahovlich (1) – 14:49; Bob Gainey (2) – sh-en – 19:55		Third period	No scoring
Ken Dryden 24 saves / 25 shots		Goalie stats	Ed Staniowski 27 saves / 30 shots

Montreal won series 4–0

==== (2) Philadelphia Flyers vs. (7) Toronto Maple Leafs ====
This was the third playoff series meeting between these two teams. Philadelphia won both previous meetings in the last two seasons. The latter of which Philadelphia won in seven games in last year's Stanley Cup Quarterfinals.

Jimmy Watson's game-winning goal with 2:38 left in Game 6 gave the Flyers the series, eliminating Toronto for the second straight year and sending them to the semifinals.

April 11	Toronto Maple Leafs	3–2	Philadelphia Flyers	Spectrum	Recap
Darryl Sittler (3) – pp – 04:10; Tiger Williams (2) – 07:11; Errol Thompson (1) – 8:52		First period	No scoring
No scoring		Second period	13:25 – pp – Rick MacLeish (1)
No scoring		Third period	10:27 – pp – Bob Dailey (1)
Mike Palmateer 17 saves / 18 shots Wayne Thomas 10 saves / 11 shots		Goalie stats	Bernie Parent 21 saves / 24 shots

April 13	Toronto Maple Leafs	4–1	Philadelphia Flyers	Spectrum	Recap
Bob Neely (1) – pp – 06:55; Stan Weir (2) – pp – 11:15		First period	No scoring
Tiger Williams (3) – 00:37; Darryl Sittler (4) – 15:08		Second period	06:07 – Bill Barber (1)
No scoring		Third period	No scoring
Mike Palmateer 27 saves / 28 shots		Goalie stats	Bernie Parent 11 saves / 15 shots Wayne Stephenson 5 saves / 5 shots

April 15	Philadelphia Flyers	4–3	OT	Toronto Maple Leafs	Maple Leaf Gardens	Recap
No scoring		First period		03:48 – pp – Darryl Sittler (5); 18:27 – pp – Ian Turnbull (3)
Ross Lonsberry (1) – 03:18; Orest Kindrachuk (1) – pp – 12:53		Second period		No scoring
Rick MacLeish (2) – 19:22		Third period		15:41 – Errol Thompson (2)
Rick MacLeish (3) – 02:55		First overtime period		No scoring
Wayne Stephenson 25 saves / 28 shots		Goalie stats		Mike Palmateer 33 saves / 37 shots

April 17	Philadelphia Flyers	6–5	OT	Toronto Maple Leafs	Maple Leaf Gardens	Recap
Bobby Clarke (1) – pp – 13:28		First period		No scoring
Reggie Leach (1) – 11:21		Second period		04:03 – Lanny McDonald (5); 06:16 – pp – Borje Salming (3); 18:45 – pp – Lanny McDonald (6)
Mel Bridgman (1) – sh – 14:11; Tom Bladon (1) – 18:11; Bobby Clarke (2) – 18:27		Third period		06:24 – Lanny McDonald (7); 12:44 – pp – Lanny McDonald (8)
Reggie Leach (2) – 19:10		First overtime period		No scoring
Wayne Stephenson 37 saves / 42 shots		Goalie stats		Mike Palmateer 39 saves / 45 shots

April 19	Toronto Maple Leafs	0–2	Philadelphia Flyers	Spectrum	Recap
No scoring		First period	14:12 – Reggie Leach (3)
No scoring		Second period	No scoring
No scoring		Third period	15:07 – Reggie Leach (4)
Mike Palmateer 37 saves / 39 shots		Goalie stats	Wayne Stephenson 21 saves / 21 shots

April 21	Philadelphia Flyers	4–3	Toronto Maple Leafs	Maple Leaf Gardens	Recap
No scoring		First period	11:43 – pp – Ian Turnbull (4)
Bobby Clarke (3) – 04:10; Bob Dailey (2) – 15:36		Second period	07:17 – Lanny McDonald (9)
Rick MacLeish (4) – pp – 07:37; Jimmy Watson (1) – 17:22		Third period	05:06 – pp – Lanny McDonald (10)
Wayne Stephenson 21 saves / 24 shots		Goalie stats	Wayne Thomas 26 saves / 30 shots

Philadelphia won series 4–2

==== (3) Boston Bruins vs. (6) Los Angeles Kings ====
This was the second playoff series meeting between these two teams. This was a rematch of last year's Stanley Cup Quarterfinals, in which Boston won in seven games.

Gregg Sheppard's game-winning goal in Game 6 prevented a Kings comeback and won the series for the Bruins.

April 11	Los Angeles Kings	3–8	Boston Bruins	Boston Garden	Recap
No scoring		First period	01:49 – Bobby Schmautz (1); 02:45 – Brad Park (1); 04:50 – Bobby Schmautz (2); 12:15 – sh – Gregg Sheppard (1); 19:24 – Bobby Schmautz (3)
Don Kozak (3) – 09:45; Vic Venasky (1) – pp – 18:37		Second period	11:30 – Terry O'Reilly (1)
Dave Hutchison (1) – 10:24		Third period	02:06 – Stan Jonathan (1); 15:52 – pp – Peter McNab (1)
Rogie Vachon 24 saves / 32 shots		Goalie stats	Gerry Cheevers 19 saves / 22 shots

April 13	Los Angeles Kings	2–6	Boston Bruins	Boston Garden	Recap
No scoring		First period	06:14 – Stan Jonathan (2); 07:28 – Terry O'Reilly (2); 09:53 – Bobby Schmautz (4)
No scoring		Second period	17:03 – Jean Ratelle (1); 17:59 – Bobby Schmautz (5)
Tom Williams (1) – pp – 14:11; Marcel Dionne (3) – pp – 19:29		Third period	03:09 – Gregg Sheppard (2)
Rogie Vachon 11 saves / 16 shots Gary Simmons 6 saves / 7 shots		Goalie stats	Gerry Cheevers 15 saves / 17 shots

April 15	Boston Bruins	7–6	Los Angeles Kings	The Forum	Recap
Bobby Schmautz (6) – pp – 05:49		First period	03:40 – Mike Murphy (2); 10:51 – pp – Bob Murdoch (1); 19:20 – Butch Goring (5)
Terry O'Reilly (3) – 01:59; Don Marcotte (1) – 03:39		Second period	07:00 – Gary Sargent (1); 16:33 – Tom Williams (2)
Bobby Schmautz (7) – pp – 00:10; Wayne Cashman – 11:27; Don Marcotte (2) – 17:08; Stan Jonathan (3) – 19:47		Third period	18:05 – Marcel Dionne (4)
Gerry Cheevers 18 saves / 24 shots		Goalie stats	Rogie Vachon 22 saves / 29 shots

April 17	Boston Bruins	4–7	Los Angeles Kings	The Forum	Recap
No scoring		First period	00:06 – Don Kozak (4); 18:39 – Frank St. Marseille (1)
Peter McNab (2) – 01:30		Second period	15:56 – pp – Butch Goring (6); 18:40 – pp – Gary Sargent (2)
Jean Ratelle (2) – pp – 03:26; Bobby Schmautz (8) – 05:51; Rick Middleton (1) – 15:08		Third period	10:08 – Marcel Dionne (5); 10:51 – Mike Murphy (3); 14:45 – Gene Carr (1)
Gerry Cheevers 11 saves / 15 shots Gilles Gilbert 4 saves / 7 shots		Goalie stats	Rogie Vachon 30 saves / 34 shots

April 19	Los Angeles Kings	3–1	Boston Bruins	Boston Garden	Recap
Dave Schultz (1) – pp – 16:22		First period	No scoring
No scoring		Second period	13:42 – Rick Middleton (2)
Bob Murdoch (2) – 01:00; Mike Murphy (4) – en – 19:59		Third period	No scoring
Rogie Vachon 39 saves / 40 shots		Goalie stats	Gerry Cheevers 18 saves / 20 shots

April 21	Boston Bruins	4–3	Los Angeles Kings	The Forum	Recap
Rick Middleton (3) – 03:42; Stan Jonathan (4) – 07:35; Rick Middleton (4) – 07:46		First period	No scoring
No scoring		Second period	No scoring
Gregg Sheppard (3) – pp – 12:58		Third period	00:42 – pp – Gary Sargent (3); 05:39 – Tom Williams (3); 08:51 – pp – Butch Goring (7)
Gerry Cheevers 15 saves / 18 shots		Goalie stats	Rogie Vachon 34 saves / 38 shots

Boston won series 4–2

==== (4) New York Islanders vs. (5) Buffalo Sabres ====
This was the second playoff series meeting between these two teams. This was a rematch of last year's Stanley Cup Quarterfinals, in which New York won in six games.

April 11	Buffalo Sabres	2–4	New York Islanders	Nassau Coliseum	Recap
No scoring		First period	12:28 – Garry Howatt (1); 18:44 – Billy Harris (1)
Gilbert Perreault (1) – 09:38; Rene Robert (3) – 11:39		Second period	12:04 – Clark Gillies (2); 18:33 – Jude Drouin (2)
No scoring		Third period	No scoring
Don Edwards 24 saves / 28 shots		Goalie stats	Billy Smith 37 saves / 39 shots

April 13	Buffalo Sabres	2–4	New York Islanders	Nassau Coliseum	Recap
Don Luce (1) – 11:26; Rene Robert (4) – pp – 15:40		First period	No scoring
No scoring		Second period	13:50 – Bob Bourne (2); 16:31 – Bryan Trottier (1)
No scoring		Third period	08:30 – Clark Gillies (3); 11:35 – Dave Lewis (1)
Don Edwards 18 saves / 22 shots		Goalie stats	Billy Smith 24 saves / 26 shots

April 15	New York Islanders	4–3	Buffalo Sabres	Buffalo Memorial Auditorium	Recap
Billy Harris (2) – 17:39		First period	02:18 – pp – Rick Martin (2); 06:29 – pp – Jerry Korab (2)
Jude Drouin (3) – 10:55; Jude Drouin (4) – pp – 13:40		Second period	No scoring
Clark Gillies (4) – 00:09		Third period	10:10 – pp – Don Luce (2)
Billy Smith 45 saves / 48 shots		Goalie stats	Don Edwards 19 saves / 23 shots

April 17	New York Islanders	4–3	Buffalo Sabres	Buffalo Memorial Auditorium	Recap
Billy Harris (3) – pp – 10:29		First period	02:49 – Jocelyn Guevremont (3)
Ed Westfall (1) – sh – 09:54; Denis Potvin (2) – 18:51		Second period	06:16 – pp – Don Luce (3)
Billy MacMillan (2) – 07:42		Third period	04:57 – Rene Robert (5)
Billy Smith 26 saves / 29 shots		Goalie stats	Gerry Desjardins 17 saves / 21 shots

New York won series 4–0

=== Semifinals ===
==== (1) Montreal Canadiens vs. (4) New York Islanders ====
This was the second playoff series meeting between these two teams. This was a rematch of last year's Stanley Cup Semifinals, in which Montreal won in five games.

April 23	New York Islanders	3–4	Montreal Canadiens	Montreal Forum	Recap
Billy Harris (4) – pp – 08:39; Billy Harris (5) – 12:56		First period	12:14 – Peter Mahovlich (2)
Billy Harris (6) – 00:49		Second period	09:40 – Murray Wilson (1)
No scoring		Third period	02:25 – Guy Lafleur (6); 04:07 – Steve Shutt (4)
Billy Smith 34 saves / 38 shots		Goalie stats	Ken Dryden 16 saves / 19 shots

April 26	New York Islanders	0–3	Montreal Canadiens	Montreal Forum	Recap
No scoring		First period	No scoring
No scoring		Second period	No scoring
No scoring		Third period	07:46 – sh – Jimmy Roberts (1); 11:31 – Larry Robinson (2); 19:24 – pp – Peter Mahovlich (3)
Billy Smith 30 saves / 33 shots		Goalie stats	Ken Dryden 19 saves / 19 shots

April 28	Montreal Canadiens	3–5	New York Islanders	Nassau Coliseum	Recap
Guy Lapointe (2) – 11:10; Jimmy Roberts (2) – 17:29		First period	12:49 – pp – Denis Potvin (3); 19:50 – Denis Potvin (4)
No scoring		Second period	06:04 – J.P. Parise (3)
Guy Lapointe (3) – 16:20		Third period	11:09 – Andre St. Laurent (1); 19:49 – en – Bryan Trottier (2)
Ken Dryden 19 saves / 23 shots		Goalie stats	Billy Smith 35 saves / 38 shots

April 30	Montreal Canadiens	4–0	New York Islanders	Nassau Coliseum	Recap
Steve Shutt (5) – 01:04; Guy Lafleur (7) – 02:23; Jimmy Roberts (3) – 08:18		First period	No scoring
Steve Shutt (6) – 17:31		Second period	No scoring
No scoring		Third period	No scoring
Ken Dryden 18 saves / 18 shots		Goalie stats	Billy Smith 18 saves / 22 shots Chico Resch 11 saves / 11 shots

May 3	New York Islanders	4–3	OT	Montreal Canadiens	Montreal Forum	Recap
J.P. Parise (4) – pp – 08:11		First period		09:08 – Jacques Lemaire (3)
Denis Potvin (5) – 18:11		Second period		03:27 – Mario Tremblay (1)
Jude Drouin (5) – 13:09		Third period		11:38 – Yvon Lambert (1)
Billy Harris (7) – 03:58		First overtime period		No scoring
Chico Resch 26 saves / 29 shots		Goalie stats		Ken Dryden 15 saves / 19 shots

May 5	Montreal Canadiens	2–1	New York Islanders	Nassau Coliseum	Recap
Bob Gainey (3) – 00:07		First period	No scoring
No scoring		Second period	No scoring
Bob Gainey (4) – 9:12		Third period	19:51 – Denis Potvin (6)
Ken Dryden 27 saves / 28 shots		Goalie stats	Chico Resch 18 saves / 20 shots

Montreal won series 4–2

==== (2) Philadelphia Flyers vs. (3) Boston Bruins ====
This was the third playoff series meeting between these two teams. Philadelphia won both previous meetings. This was a rematch of last year's Stanley Cup Semifinals, in which Philadelphia won in five games.

April 24	Boston Bruins	4–3	OT	Philadelphia Flyers	Spectrum	Recap
Jean Ratelle (3) – 11:36		First period		No scoring
Bobby Schmautz (9) – pp – 06:56; Don Marcotte (3) – sh – 15:31		Second period		No scoring
No scoring		Third period		01:45 – pp – Bobby Clarke (4); 16:33 – Bob Dailey (3); 19:31 – Bobby Clarke (5)
Rick Middleton (5) – 02:57		First overtime period		No scoring
Gerry Cheevers 35 saves / 38 shots		Goalie stats		Wayne Stephenson 17 saves / 20 shots Bernie Parent 3 saves / 4 shots

April 26	Boston Bruins	5–4	2OT	Philadelphia Flyers	Spectrum	Recap
Peter McNab (3) – 13:45		First period		14:53 – Andre Dupont (1)
Gregg Sheppard (4) – 14:01; Mike Milbury (1) – 15:01; Jean Ratelle (4) – 15:39		Second period		05:35 – Orest Kindrachuk (2); 07:58 – Paul Holmgren (1); 15:16 – Gary Dornhoefer (1)
No scoring		Third period		No scoring
Terry O'Reilly (4) – 10:07		Second overtime period		No scoring
Gerry Cheevers 43 saves / 47 shots		Goalie stats		Wayne Stephenson 28 saves / 33 shots

April 28	Philadelphia Flyers	1–2	Boston Bruins	Boston Garden	Recap
Bob Dailey (4) – pp – 08:59		First period	No scoring
No scoring		Second period	12:07 – Peter McNab (4)
No scoring		Third period	07:51 – Mike Milbury (2)
Wayne Stephenson 26 saves / 28 shots		Goalie stats	Gerry Cheevers 14 saves / 15 shots

May 1	Philadelphia Flyers	0–3	Boston Bruins	Boston Garden	Recap
No scoring		First period	No scoring
No scoring		Second period	10:45 – Jean Ratelle (5)
No scoring		Third period	14:05 – Don Marcotte (4); 19:13 – en – Don Marcotte (5)
Wayne Stephenson 35 saves / 37 shots		Goalie stats	Gerry Cheevers 21 saves / 21 shots

Boston won series 4–0

=== Stanley Cup Final ===
This was the 16th playoff series meeting between these two teams. Montreal lead 13–2 in previous meetings. They last met in the 1971 Stanley Cup quarterfinals, in which Montreal upset Boston in seven games.

The defending champion Montreal Canadiens took on the "Original Six" rival, the third-ranked Boston Bruins in the Final. Both teams had swept a series and had lost only two games in the earlier rounds. The Canadiens swept the series in four games to win their second consecutive Stanley Cup.

May 7	Boston Bruins	3–7	Montreal Canadiens	Montreal Forum	Recap
Brad Park (2) – 05:23		First period	01:45 – Doug Risebrough (1); 04:23 – pp – Yvon Lambert (2); 14:35 – Mario Tremblay (2)
Terry O'Reilly (5) – 11:54; Bobby Schmautz (10) – pp – 16:35		Second period	05:08 – Jacques Lemaire (4)
No scoring		Third period	00:59 – Rick Chartraw (2); 02:04 – Mario Tremblay (3); 13:58 – Yvon Lambert (3)
Gerry Cheevers 17 saves / 24 shots		Goalie stats	Ken Dryden 17 saves / 20 shots

May 10	Boston Bruins	0–3	Montreal Canadiens	Montreal Forum	Recap
No scoring		First period	No scoring
No scoring		Second period	07:43 – pp – Peter Mahovlich (4); 12:07 – Doug Risebrough (2)
No scoring		Third period	05:40 – Steve Shutt (7)
Gerry Cheevers 16 saves / 19 shots		Goalie stats	Ken Dryden 22 saves / 22 shots

May 12	Montreal Canadiens	4–2	Boston Bruins	Boston Garden	Recap
Guy Lafleur (8) – pp – 04:08; Steve Shutt (8) – pp – 07:58; Jacques Lemaire (5) – pp – 18:29		First period	No scoring
No scoring		Second period	06:32 – Gregg Sheppard (5)
Guy Lafleur (9) – 12:52		Third period	18:34 – pp – Peter McNab (5)
Ken Dryden 23 saves / 25 shots		Goalie stats	Gerry Cheevers 15 saves / 19 shots

May 14	Montreal Canadiens	2–1	OT	Boston Bruins	Boston Garden	Recap
No scoring		First period		11:38 – Bobby Schmautz (11)
Jacques Lemaire (6) – 01:34		Second period		No scoring
No scoring		Third period		No scoring
Jacques Lemaire (7) – 04:32		First overtime period		No scoring
Ken Dryden 25 saves / 26 shots		Goalie stats		Gerry Cheevers 26 saves / 28 shots

Montreal won series 4–0

== Awards ==
1977 NHL awards
Prince of Wales Trophy: (Wales Conference regular season champion)	Montreal Canadiens
Clarence S. Campbell Bowl: (Campbell Conference regular season champion)	Philadelphia Flyers
Art Ross Trophy: (Top scorer, regular season)	Guy Lafleur, Montreal Canadiens
Bill Masterton Memorial Trophy: (Perseverance, sportsmanship, and dedication)	Ed Westfall, New York Islanders
Calder Memorial Trophy: (Top first-year player)	Willi Plett, Atlanta Flames
Conn Smythe Trophy: (Most valuable player, playoffs)	Guy Lafleur, Montreal Canadiens
Hart Memorial Trophy: (Most valuable player, regular season)	Guy Lafleur, Montreal Canadiens
Jack Adams Award: (Best coach)	Scotty Bowman, Montreal Canadiens
James Norris Memorial Trophy: (Best defenceman)	Larry Robinson, Montreal Canadiens
Lady Byng Memorial Trophy: (Excellence and sportsmanship)	Marcel Dionne, Los Angeles Kings
Lester B. Pearson Award: (Outstanding player, regular season)	Guy Lafleur, Montreal Canadiens
Vezina Trophy: (Goaltender(s) of team(s) with best goaltending record)	Ken Dryden & Michel Larocque, Montreal Canadiens

=== All-Star teams ===
First Team	Position	Second Team
Ken Dryden, Montreal Canadiens	G	Rogie Vachon, Los Angeles Kings
Larry Robinson, Montreal Canadiens	D	Denis Potvin, New York Islanders
Borje Salming, Toronto Maple Leafs	D	Guy Lapointe, Montreal Canadiens
Marcel Dionne, Los Angeles Kings	C	Gilbert Perreault, Buffalo Sabres
Guy Lafleur, Montreal Canadiens	RW	Lanny McDonald, Toronto Maple Leafs
Steve Shutt, Montreal Canadiens	LW	Rick Martin, Buffalo Sabres

== Player statistics ==
=== Scoring leaders ===
GP = Games Played, G = Goals, A = Assists, Pts = Points, PIM = Penalties In Minutes

Player	Team	GP	G	A	Pts	PIM
Guy Lafleur	Montreal Canadiens	80	56	80	136	20
Marcel Dionne	Los Angeles Kings	80	53	69	122	12
Steve Shutt	Montreal Canadiens	80	60	45	105	28
Rick MacLeish	Philadelphia Flyers	79	49	48	97	42
Gilbert Perreault	Buffalo Sabres	80	39	56	95	30
Tim Young	Minnesota North Stars	80	29	66	95	58
Jean Ratelle	Boston Bruins	78	33	61	94	22
Lanny McDonald	Toronto Maple Leafs	80	46	44	90	77
Darryl Sittler	Toronto Maple Leafs	73	38	52	90	89
Bobby Clarke	Philadelphia Flyers	80	27	63	90	71

Source: NHL.

=== Leading goaltenders ===
Note: GP = Games played; Min = Minutes played; GA = Goals against; GAA = Goals against average; W = Wins; L = Losses; T = Ties; SO = Shutouts

Player	Team	GP	MIN	GA	GAA	W	L	T	SO
Michel Larocque	Montreal Canadiens	26	1525	53	2.09	19	2	4	4
Ken Dryden	Montreal Canadiens	56	3275	117	2.14	41	6	8	10
Chico Resch	N.Y. Islanders	46	2711	103	2.28	26	13	6	4
Billy Smith	N.Y. Islanders	36	2089	98	2.50	21	8	6	2
Don Edwards	Buffalo Sabres	25	1480	62	2.51	16	7	2	2
Gerry Desjardins	Buffalo Sabres	49	2871	126	2.63	31	12	6	3
Bernie Parent	Philadelphia Flyers	61	3525	159	2.71	35	13	12	5
Rogatien Vachon	Los Angeles Kings	68	4059	184	2.72	33	23	12	8
Denis Herron	Pittsburgh Penguins	34	1920	94	2.94	15	11	5	1
Dunc Wilson	Pittsburgh Penguins	45	2627	129	2.95	18	19	8	5

== Coaches ==
=== Patrick Division ===
- Atlanta Flames: Fred Creighton
- New York Islanders: Al Arbour
- New York Rangers: John Ferguson Sr.
- Philadelphia Flyers: Fred Shero

=== Adams Division ===
- Boston Bruins: Don Cherry
- Buffalo Sabres: Floyd Smith
- Cleveland Barons: Jack Evans
- Toronto Maple Leafs: Red Kelly

=== Norris Division ===
- Detroit Red Wings: Larry Wilson
- Los Angeles Kings: Bob Pulford
- Montreal Canadiens: Scotty Bowman
- Pittsburgh Penguins: Ken Schinkel
- Washington Capitals: Tom McVie

=== Smythe Division ===
- Chicago Black Hawks: Billy Reay and Bill White
- Colorado Rockies: Johnny Wilson
- Minnesota North Stars: Ted Harris
- St. Louis Blues: Emile Francis
- Vancouver Canucks: Phil Maloney and Orland Kurtenbach

== Debuts ==
The following is a list of players of note who played their first NHL game in 1976–77 (listed with their first team, asterisk(*) marks debut in playoffs):

- Mike Palmateer, Toronto Maple Leafs
- Don Edwards, Buffalo Sabres
- Bob Sauve, Buffalo Sabres
- Reed Larson, Detroit Red Wings
- Brian Engblom*, Montreal Canadiens
- Don Murdoch, New York Rangers
- Bernie Federko, St. Louis Blues
- Brian Sutter, St. Louis Blues
- Randy Carlyle, Toronto Maple Leafs
- Rick Green, Washington Capitals

== Last games ==
The following is a list of players of note that played their last game in the NHL in 1976–77 (listed with their last team):

- Pat Quinn, Atlanta Flames
- Gilles Villemure, Chicago Black Hawks
- Jim Pappin, Cleveland Barons
- Simon Nolet, Colorado Rockies
- Bob Berry, Los Angeles Kings
- Ed Van Impe, Pittsburgh Penguins
- Vic Hadfield, Pittsburgh Penguins
- Barclay Plager, St. Louis Blues
- Roger Crozier, Washington Capitals

== Broadcasting ==
Hockey Night in Canada on CBC Television televised Saturday night regular season games and Stanley Cup playoff games. CTV stopped regularly airing HNIC-produced Wednesday night regular season game telecasts, and started to give the rights to these midweek games back to local stations.

In the U.S., this was the second season that NHL games aired in national broadcast syndication under the NHL Network package.

== See also ==
- List of Stanley Cup champions
- 1976 NHL amateur draft
- 1976–77 NHL transactions
- 1976 Canada Cup
- 30th National Hockey League All-Star Game
- National Hockey League All-Star Game
- 1976–77 WHA season
- Lester Patrick Trophy
- 1976 in sports
- 1977 in sports
