= Winnipeg Rangers (1956–1967) =

Manitoba former ice hockey team

- City: Winnipeg, Manitoba
- League: Manitoba Junior Hockey League
- Operated: 1956-1967

Franchise history
- 1956-1957: Winnipeg Rangers
- 1957-1958: Brandon Rangers
- 1958-1959: Transcona Rangers
- 1959-1967: Winnipeg Rangers
- 1967-2000: St.Boniface Saints
- 2000-2012: Winnipeg Saints
- 2012-Present: Virden Oil Capitals

The Winnipeg Rangers were a Canadian junior hockey team in the Manitoba Junior Hockey League and the second team to use this name. This version of the Rangers won two Turnbull Cups (1961–62 and 1965–66).

The team was founded in 1956, but after one season in Winnipeg, the Rangers moved to Brandon due to lack of ice availability. Soon after, the team moved to Transcona (now part of Winnipeg). In 1959, the name changed back to the Winnipeg Rangers.

On March 18, 1966 at the Winnipeg Arena, the Rangers won the Turnbull Memorial Cup as MJHL champs.

Notable Rangers players included Butch Goring, Chuck Lefley, Terry Ball, and Bryan Lefley.

During the summer of 1967, a community-minded sports group purchased the Rangers from Ben Hatskin. The team was relocated to St. Boniface where they became the St. Boniface Saints. The franchise exists today as the Virden Oil Capitals.

== Season-by-season record ==
Note: GP = Games Played, W = Wins, L = Losses, T = Ties, OTL = Overtime Losses, GF = Goals for, GA = Goals against

Season	GP	W	L	T	OTL	GF	GA	Points	Finish	Playoffs
1956-57	29	7	21	1	-	95	203	15	3rd MJHL	
1957-58	30	10	20	0	-	128	193	20	4th MJHL	
1958-59	32	10	19	3	-	110	166	23	4th MJHL	
1959-60	32	10	21	1	-	100	144	21	4th MJHL	
1960-61	32	21	11	0	-	157	120	42	2nd MJHL	Won League
1961-62	40	16	20	4	-	128	150	36	4th MJHL	
1962-63	40	11	25	4	-	141	196	26	5th MJHL	
1963-64	30	15	12	3	-	120	91	33	3rd MJHL	
1964-65	45	21	18	6	-	202	170	48	2nd MJHL	
1965-66	48	27	16	5	-	219	186	59	1st MJHL	Won League
1966-67	57	34	19	4	-	263	201	74	3rd MJHL	

== See also ==
- Winnipeg Saints
- Virden Oil Capitals
