= Wayne Brown (ice hockey) =

Canadian ice hockey player (1930–2019)

Wayne "Weiner" Brown
- Born: November 16, 1930; Belleville, Ontario, Canada
- Died: September 20, 2019 (aged 88); Belleville, Ontario, Canada
- Height: 5 ft 8 in (173 cm)
- Weight: 150 lb (68 kg; 10 st 10 lb)
- Position: Right wing
- Shot: Left
- Played for: Boston Bruins; Seattle Bombers; Tacoma Rockets; Victoria Cougars
- Playing career: 1951–1973

Wayne Hewitson "Weiner" Brown (November 16, 1930 – September 20, 2019) was a Canadian professional ice hockey right winger. Although he never played in a regular season National Hockey League (NHL) game, he did play in four playoff games for the Boston Bruins in the 1953–54 season.

== Career statistics ==
=== Regular season and playoffs ===
			Regular season					Playoffs
Season	Team	League	GP	G	A	Pts	PIM	GP	G	A	Pts	PIM
1948–49	St. Catharines Teepees	OHA	46	9	13	22	35	5	0	1	1	0
1949–50	St. Catharines Teepees	OHA	47	23	17	40	58	5	0	0	0	0
1950–51	St. Catharines Teepees	OHA	51	29	23	52	80	9	5	3	8	12
1951–52	Tacoma Rockets	PCHL	70	28	30	58	36	6	1	0	1	2
1952–53	Tacoma Rockets	WHL	70	27	24	51	37	—	—	—	—	—
1953–54	Seattle Bombers	WHL	70	49	32	81	24	—	—	—	—	—
1953–54	Boston Bruins	HHL	—	—	—	—	—	4	0	0	0	2
1954–55	Vancouver Canucks	WHL	3	1	1	2	2	—	—	—	—	—
1955–56	Victoria Cougars	WHL	70	21	26	47	25	9	3	2	5	0
1956–57	Vancouver Canucks	WHL	70	27	30	57	14	3	1	1	2	2
1957–58	Belleville McFarlands	OHA Sr	48	26	24	50	22	13	10	7	17	14
1957–58	Belleville McFarlands	Al-Cup	—	—	—	—	—	14	9	7	16	2
1958–59	Belleville McFarlands	OHA Sr	46	24	29	53	46	—	—	—	—	—
1959–60	Belleville McFarlands	OHA Sr	48	23	28	51	6	13	3	4	7	4
1960–61	Clinton Comets	EHL	53	30	46	76	14	4	1	2	3	0
1964–65	Syracuse Stars	Exhib	47	34	33	67	—	—	—	—	—	—
1965–66	Syracuse Stars	Exhib	—	—	—	—	—	—	—	—	—	—
1966–67	Belleville Mohawks	OHA Sr	35	14	20	34	24	—	—	—	—	—
1967–68	Belleville Mohawks	OHA Sr	39	14	24	38	2	—	—	—	—	—
1968–69	Belleville Mohawks	OHA Sr	25	8	21	29	2	—	—	—	—	—
1969–70	Belleville Mohawks	OHA Sr	20	2	9	11	12	—	—	—	—	—
1970–71	Belleville Quintes	OHA Sr	—	—	—	—	—	—	—	—	—	—
1971–72	Belleville Quintes	OHA Sr	6	0	2	2	0	—	—	—	—	—
1972–73	Belleville Quintes	OHA Sr	1	0	0	0	0	—	—	—	—	—
WHL totals			283	125	113	238	102	12	4	3	7	2
NHL totals			—	—	—	—	—	4	0	0	0	2

=== International ===
Year	Team	Event	GP	G	A	Pts	PIM
1959	Canada	WC	5	2	1	3	7
Senior totals			5	2	1	3	7
