= Ike Hildebrand =

Canadian ice hockey and lacrosse player

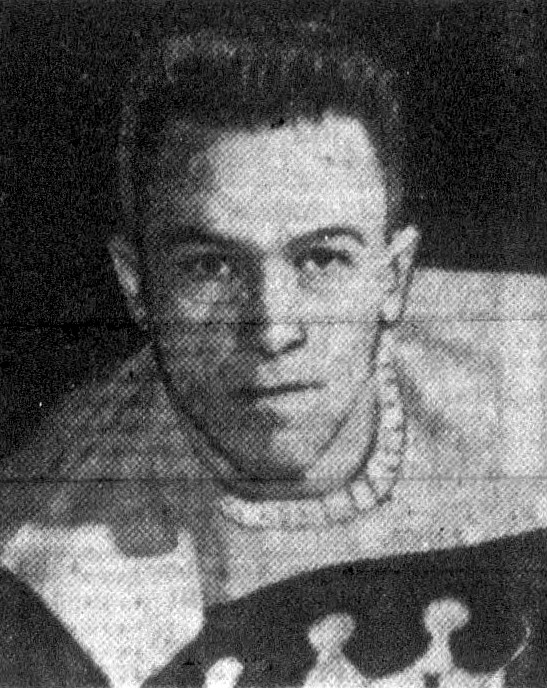
- Hildebrand, circa 1949
- Born: May 27, 1927 Winnipeg, Manitoba, Canada
- Died: August 27, 2006 (aged 79) St. Albert, Alberta, Canada
- Height: 5 ft 7 in (170 cm)
- Weight: 147 lb (67 kg; 10 st 7 lb)
- Position: Right wing
- Shot: Right
- Played for: New York Rangers; Chicago Black Hawks
- National team: Canada
- Playing career: 1944–1960

Isaac Bruce Hildebrand (May 27, 1927 – August 27, 2006) was a Canadian ice hockey and lacrosse player. Born in Winnipeg, Manitoba, he played 41 games in the National Hockey League with the New York Rangers and Chicago Black Hawks during the 1953–54 and 1954–55 seasons. The rest of his career, which lasted from 1944 to 1960, was spent in various minor leagues.

== Career ==
In 1985, he was inducted into Canada's Sports Hall of Fame for the sport of lacrosse. He was inducted into Canada's Lacrosse Hall of Fame in 1972 and Canada's Sports Hall of Fame in 1985 as well as Sports Halls of Fame in Peterborough (1978), Belleville (1989) and Oshawa (1993).

Ike excelled at both of Canada's national sports, lacrosse and hockey. He played lacrosse with the New Westminster Salmonbellies senior team and at age 17 won the MVP award in the Mann Cup Canadian championship. In a lacrosse career that spanned 17 years (1943–1960), he was honored 13 times as an all-star. After a junior ice hockey career with the Oshawa Generals, he spent 10 years playing professional hockey with minor league teams in the Pacific Coast Hockey League, the United States Hockey League, the Quebec Senior Hockey League and the American Hockey League.

Hildebrand also played 41 games in the National Hockey League with the New York Rangers, and the Chicago Black Hawks from 1953 to 1954. He was playing coach with the Belleville McFarlands and scored the winning goal when they won the 1959 World Championship for Canada.

After his playing days, Hildebrand turned to coaching with the London Nationals, Orillia Terriers, and two years with the Oshawa Generals.

He died in St. Albert, Alberta in 2006.

He is the grandfather of Canadian-American musician and record label owner Warren Hildebrand, who makes music under the name Foxes in Fiction.

== Career statistics ==
=== Regular season and playoffs ===
| | | | Regular season | | | | | Playoffs |
| Season | Team | League | GP | G | A | Pts | PIM | GP | G | A | Pts | PIM |
|---|---|---|---|---|---|---|---|---|---|---|---|---|
| 1944–45 | Seattle Ironmen | PCHL | 9 | 3 | 5 | 8 | 2 | — | — | — | — | — |
| 1945–46 | Oshawa Generals | OHA | 27 | 14 | 21 | 35 | 8 | 12 | 21 | 11 | 32 | 4 |
| 1946–47 | Oshawa Generals | OHA | 29 | 28 | 25 | 53 | 23 | 5 | 3 | 1 | 4 | 16 |
| 1947–48 | Toronto Marlboros | OHA | 35 | 29 | 37 | 66 | 29 | 5 | 2 | 0 | 2 | 6 |
| 1948–49 | Los Angeles Monarchs | PCHL | 45 | 17 | 19 | 36 | 32 | 7 | 1 | 5 | 6 | 17 |
| 1949–50 | Los Angeles Monarchs | PCHL | 63 | 24 | 36 | 60 | 28 | 17 | 6 | 8 | 14 | 20 |
| 1950–51 | Kansas City Royals | USHL | 63 | 42 | 49 | 91 | 67 | — | — | — | — | — |
| 1951–52 | Cleveland Barons | AHL | 48 | 31 | 16 | 47 | 19 | 5 | 1 | 3 | 4 | 7 |
| 1952–53 | Cleveland Barons | AHL | 64 | 38 | 34 | 72 | 40 | 11 | 1 | 1 | 2 | 11 |
| 1953–54 | New York Rangers | NHL | 31 | 6 | 7 | 13 | 12 | — | — | — | — | — |
| 1953–54 | Vancouver Canucks | WHL | 8 | 0 | 0 | 0 | 2 | — | — | — | — | — |
| 1953–54 | Chicago Black Hawks | NHL | 7 | 1 | 4 | 5 | 4 | — | — | — | — | — |
| 1954–55 | Chicago Black Hawks | NHL | 3 | 0 | 0 | 0 | 0 | — | — | — | — | — |
| 1954–55 | Montreal Royals | QSHL | 53 | 17 | 25 | 42 | 27 | 14 | 1 | 6 | 7 | 14 |
| 1955–56 | Cleveland Barons | AHL | 54 | 9 | 19 | 28 | 43 | 8 | 1 | 1 | 2 | 10 |
| 1956–57 | Pembroke Lumber Kings | EOHL | 23 | 6 | 12 | 18 | 44 | — | — | — | — | — |
| 1956–57 | Belleville McFarlands | OHA Sr | 25 | 19 | 36 | 55 | 73 | 10 | 2 | 5 | 7 | 10 |
| 1957–58 | Belleville McFarlands | OHA Sr | 51 | 15 | 39 | 54 | 55 | 13 | 5 | 19 | 24 | 2 |
| 1957–58 | Belleville McFarlands | Al-Cup | — | — | — | — | — | 14 | 6 | 12 | 18 | 12 |
| 1958–59 | Belleville McFarlands | OHA Sr | 46 | 30 | 36 | 66 | 31 | — | — | — | — | — |
| 1959–60 | Belleville McFarlands | OHA Sr | 45 | 23 | 22 | 45 | 20 | 12 | 3 | 11 | 14 | 4 |
| AHL totals | | | 166 | 78 | 69 | 147 | 102 | 24 | 3 | 5 | 8 | 28 |
| OHA Sr totals | | | 167 | 87 | 133 | 220 | 179 | 35 | 10 | 35 | 45 | 16 |
| NHL totals | | | 41 | 7 | 11 | 18 | 16 | — | — | — | — | — |

=== International ===
| Year | Team | Event | GP | G | A | Pts | PIM |
|---|---|---|---|---|---|---|---|
| 1959 | Canada | WC | 8 | 6 | 6 | 12 | 4 |
| Senior totals | | | 8 | 6 | 6 | 12 | 4 |
