= Barton Bradley =

Canadian ice hockey player (1930–2006)

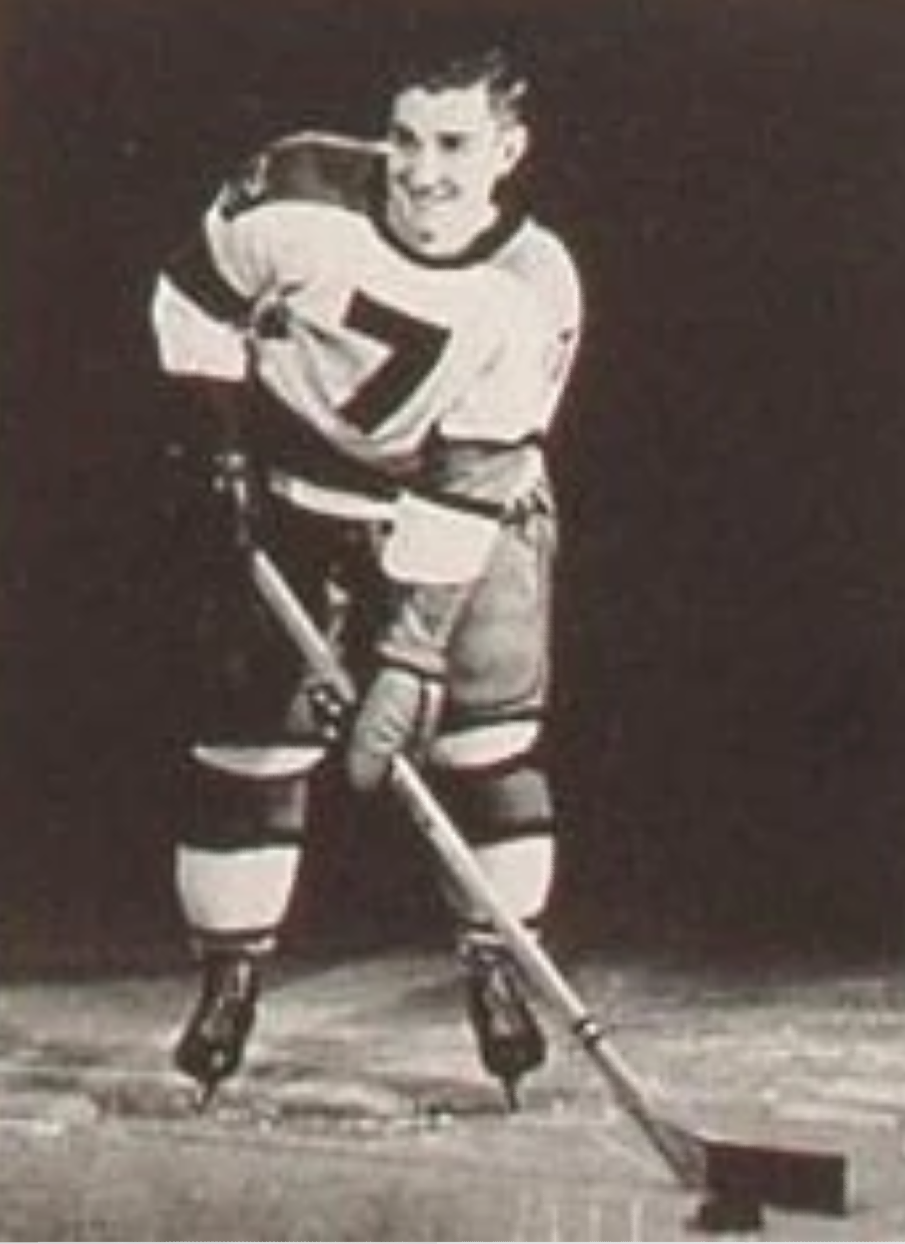
- Born: July 29, 1930; Fort William, Ontario, Canada
- Died: September 16, 2006 (aged 76); Surrey, British Columbia, Canada
- Height: 5 ft 8 in (173 cm)
- Weight: 150 lb (68 kg; 10 st 10 lb)
- Position: Centre
- Shot: Left
- Played for: Boston Bruins
- National team: Canada
- Playing career: 1949–1960

Barton Bradley
Medal record

Men's ice hockey

Representing Canada

World Championships
Gold medal – first place	1959 Czechoslovakia	

Barton William "Bart" Bradley (July 29, 1930 – September 16, 2006) was a Canadian ice hockey centre. He played one game in the National Hockey League with the Boston Bruins during the 1949–50 season. The rest of his career, which lasted from 1949 to 1960, was spent in various minor leagues. Internationally Bradley played for the Canadian national team at the 1959 World Championships, winning a gold medal.

== Playing career ==
Bradley played junior hockey in the Thunder Bay Junior Hockey League for the Port Arthur West End Bruins from 1946 to 1949, winning the playoff championship in 1948 and 1949 as well as the 1948 Memorial Cup. He turned pro in 1949 and signed with the American Hockey League's Hershey Bears, but was called up to play one game in the National Hockey League (NHL) for the Boston Bruins on March 22, 1950, against the Chicago Black Hawks; this would be his only game in the NHL. Spells in the United States Hockey League for the Tulsa Oilers and the Pacific Coast Hockey League with the Tacoma Rockets was followed by a seven-year tenure in the Western Hockey League, beginning with the Rockets who only lasted one season. He then had spells with the Seattle Bombers, New Westminster Royals, Victoria Cougars and the Seattle Americans.

In 1957, Bradley began playing senior hockey, beginning with two seasons with the Belleville McFarlands. He also played for the Port Arthur Bearcats and the Fort William Beavers before officially retiring in 1966.

== Career statistics ==
=== Regular season and playoffs ===
			Regular season					Playoffs
Season	Team	League	GP	G	A	Pts	PIM	GP	G	A	Pts	PIM
1946–47	Port Arthur Bruins	TBJHL	6	5	6	11	7	7	5	4	9	4
1947–48	Port Arthur Bruins	TBJHL	9	9	9	18	7	5	4	3	7	2
1947–48	Port Arthur Bruins	M-Cup	—	—	—	—	—	17	10	18	28	12
1948–49	Port Arthur Bruins	TBJHL	12	10	20	30	28	5	2	9	11	12
1948–49	Port Arthur Bruins	M-Cup	—	—	—	—	—	5	3	3	6	2
1949–50	Boston Bruins	NHL	1	0	0	0	0	—	—	—	—	—
1949–50	Hershey Bears	AHL	61	16	19	35	8	—	—	—	—	—
1950–51	Tulsa Oilers	USHL	64	27	37	64	32	9	3	3	6	30
1951–52	Tacoma Rockets	PCHL	70	37	39	76	28	7	2	8	10	2
1952–53	Tacoma Rockets	WHL	70	26	47	73	28	—	—	—	—	—
1953–54	Seattle Bombers	WHL	27	7	19	26	8	—	—	—	—	—
1954–55	New Westminster Royals	WHL	47	12	15	27	9	1	0	0	0	0
1955–56	Seattle Americans	WHL	68	22	28	50	37	—	—	—	—	—
1956–57	Seattle Americans	WHL	63	10	16	26	19	6	1	1	2	7
1957–58	Belleville McFarlands	OHA Sr	50	30	34	64	32	13	9	11	20	—
1957–58	Belleville McFarlands	Al-Cup	—	—	—	—	—	12	3	9	12	2
1958–59	Belleville McFarlands	OHA Sr	48	21	29	50	18	—	—	—	—	—
1959–60	Belleville McFarlands	OHA Sr	53	12	30	42	8	12	3	5	8	8
1963–64	Port Arthur Bearcats	Al-Cup	—	—	—	—	—	2	0	0	0	0
1965–66	Fort William Beavers	TBSHL	10	5	7	12	2	—	—	—	—	—
WHL totals			275	77	125	202	101	7	1	1	2	7
NHL totals			1	0	0	0	0	—	—	—	—	—

=== International ===
Year	Team	Event	GP	G	A	Pts	PIM
1959	Canada	Ice Hockey World Championships	8	5	5	10	8
Senior totals			8	5	5	10	8

== See also ==
- List of players who played only one game in the NHL
