= Gerry Goyer =

Canadian ice hockey player (1936–2022)

- Born: October 20, 1936 Belleville, Ontario, Canada
- Died: March 10, 2022 (aged 85) Cranbrook, British Columbia, Canada
- Height: 6 ft 1 in (185 cm)
- Weight: 196 lb (89 kg; 14 st 0 lb)
- Position: Centre
- Shot: Left
- Played for: Chicago Black Hawks
- Playing career: 1958–1977

Gerald Francis Goyer (October 20, 1936 – March 10, 2022) was a Canadian professional ice hockey player who played 40 games in the National Hockey League with the Chicago Black Hawks during the 1967–68 season. The rest of his career, which lasted from 1958 to 1977, was mainly spent in the minor Western Hockey League. Goyer was also a member of the Allan Cup champion Belleville McFarlands in 1957–58. He died on March 10, 2022, at the age of 85.

== Career statistics ==
=== Regular season and playoffs ===
			Regular season					Playoffs
Season	Team	League	GP	G	A	Pts	PIM	GP	G	A	Pts	PIM
1954–55	Pointe Anne Hawks	OHA-INT	—	—	—	—	—	—	—	—	—	—
1955–56	Guelph Biltmores	OHA	48	27	36	63	9	3	3	0	3	0
1955–56	Guelph Biltmores	M-Cup	—	—	—	—	—	6	0	1	1	0
1956–57	Guelph Biltmores	OHA	52	17	20	37	0	10	4	5	9	0
1956–57	Belleville McFarlands	OHA Sr	1	0	0	0	0	—	—	—	—	—
1956–57	Guelph Biltmores	M-Cup	—	—	—	—	—	6	0	1	1	0
1957–58	Belleville McFarlands	OHA Sr	45	12	25	37	17	—	—	—	—	—
1957–58	Belleville McFarlands	Al-Cup	—	—	—	—	—	7	5	8	13	0
1958–59	Kelowna Packers	OSHL	54	42	50	92	57	—	—	—	—	—
1958–59	Seattle Totems	WHL	—	—	—	—	—	12	4	2	6	2
1959–60	Seattle Totems	WHL	71	15	26	41	19	11	5	4	9	0
1960–61	Victoria Cougars	WHL	70	31	46	77	28	5	0	4	4	0
1961–62	Los Angeles Blades	WHL	53	29	41	70	24	—	—	—	—	—
1962–63	Portland Buckaroos	WHL	68	22	56	78	10	7	4	5	9	0
1963–64	Portland Buckaroos	WHL	68	26	26	52	25	5	1	3	4	0
1964–65	Portland Buckaroos	WHL	70	26	51	77	20	10	7	8	15	8
1965–66	Portland Buckaroos	WHL	72	31	45	76	16	14	8	9	17	4
1966–67	Portland Buckaroos	WHL	71	20	48	68	14	4	0	0	0	4
1967–68	Chicago Black Hawks	NHL	40	1	2	3	4	3	0	0	0	2
1967–68	Dallas Black Hawks	CHL	5	1	5	6	2	—	—	—	—	—
1968–69	Portland Buckaroos	WHL	67	12	28	40	28	11	1	2	3	0
1969–70	Portland Buckaroos	WHL	2	1	0	1	0	—	—	—	—	—
1969–70	Rochester Americans	AHL	5	2	5	7	2	—	—	—	—	—
1969–70	Vancouver Canucks	WHL	58	24	50	74	12	11	5	16	21	12
1970–71	San Diego Gulls	WHL	72	24	67	91	39	6	1	4	5	8
1971–72	San Diego Gulls	WHL	71	22	48	70	27	4	0	2	2	0
1972–73	San Diego Gulls	WHL	70	28	41	69	36	6	0	1	1	13
1973–74	San Diego Gulls	WHL	68	18	46	64	43	4	0	0	0	0
1974–75	Cranbrook Royals	WIHL	45	23	57	80	49	—	—	—	—	—
1975–76	Cranbrook Royals	WIHL	25	6	23	29	23	12	6	16	22	—
1976–77	Cranbrook Royals	WIHL	56	12	53	65	19	—	—	—	—	—
WHL totals			951	314	593	907	322	110	36	60	96	51
NHL totals			40	1	2	3	4	3	0	0	0	2
