= Gordie Bell =

Canadian ice hockey player (1925–1980)

- Born: March 13, 1925 Portage la Prairie, Manitoba, Canada
- Died: November 3, 1980 (aged 55) Belleville, Ontario, Canada
- Height: 5 ft 10 in (178 cm)
- Weight: 164 lb (74 kg; 11 st 10 lb)
- Position: Goaltender
- Shot: Left
- Played for: Toronto Maple Leafs; New York Rangers
- National team: Canada
- Playing career: 1942–1959

Gordon John Edward "Tinkle" Bell (March 13, 1925 – November 3, 1980) was a Canadian professional ice hockey goaltender.

In the 1945–46 season he made 8 appearances for the Toronto Maple Leafs. He would not play another NHL game for 10 more years when he suited up for the New York Rangers in 2 playoff games during the 1955–56 season.

Bell played several seasons in the minor league American Hockey League. He began his pro career in 1942–43 with the Buffalo Bisons of the AHL. After a two-season absence from pro hockey, he split the 1944–5 season between Toronto and the Providence Reds. He died in Belleville, Ontario on November 3, 1980.

His brother Joe Bell also played in the NHL.

== Career statistics ==
=== Regular season and playoffs ===
			Regular season								Playoffs
Season	Team	League	GP	W	L	T	Min	GA	SO	GAA	GP	W	L	T	Min	GA	SO	GAA
1941–42	Portage Terriers	MJHL	17	14	2	0	1000	77	0	4.62	5	5	0	0	300	22	0	4.40
1941–42	Portage Terriers	M-Cup	—	—	—	—	—	—	—	—	10	9	1	0	600	52	0	5.20
1942–43	Buffalo Bisons	AHL	52	28	17	7	3220	125	9	2.33	9	7	2	0	550	16	1	1.75
1943–44	Winnipeg Navy	WNDHL	10	—	—	—	600	35	0	3.50	—	—	—	—	—	—	—	—
1943–44	Cornwallis Navy	Exhib	2	2	0	0	120	6	0	3.00	—	—	—	—	—	—	—	—
1943–44	Cornwallis Navy	Al-Cup	—	—	—	—	—	—	—	—	5	4	1	0	300	15	0	3.00
1945–46	Toronto Maple Leafs	NHL	8	3	5	0	480	31	0	3.88	—	—	—	—	—	—	—	—
1945–46	Providence Reds	AHL	37	14	19	4	2220	152	1	4.10	2	0	2	—	120	7	0	3.50
1946–47	Pittsburgh Hornets	AHL	23	11	7	5	1380	80	1	3.48	—	—	—	—	—	—	—	—
1946–47	Hollywood Wolves	PCHL	26	—	—	—	1560	67	1	2.58	7	4	3	—	420	17	1	2.43
1947–48	Washington Lions	AHL	64	14	42	6	3840	332	1	5.19	—	—	—	—	—	—	—	—
1948–49	Fort Worth Rangers	USHL	13	5	5	3	780	57	0	4.38	—	—	—	—	—	—	—	—
1948–49	Springfield Indians	AHL	4	1	3	0	240	16	0	4.00	—	—	—	—	—	—	—	—
1948–49	Omaha Knights	USHL	36	21	7	7	2160	84	0	2.33	4	2	2	—	254	18	0	4.25
1949–50	Louisville Blades	USHL	29	13	13	3	1740	121	0	4.17	—	—	—	—	—	—	—	—
1949–50	Buffalo Bisons	AHL	36	17	14	5	2160	114	2	3.17	3	1	2	—	188	14	0	4.47
1950–51	Buffalo Bisons	AHL	7	5	2	0	420	23	0	3.29	—	—	—	—	—	—	—	—
1950–51	Springfield Indians	AHL	51	20	29	2	3120	186	2	3.58	2	0	2	—	120	15	0	7.50
1951–52	Syracuse Warriors	AHL	63	24	38	1	3820	244	0	3.83	—	—	—	—	—	—	—	—
1952–53	Syracuse Warriors	AHL	64	31	31	2	3870	200	6	3.10	4	1	3	—	239	8	0	2.01
1953–54	Syracuse Warriors	AHL	49	21	25	3	2940	176	0	3.59	—	—	—	—	—	—	—	—
1954–55	Springfield Indians	AHL	10	2	8	0	600	47	0	4.70	—	—	—	—	—	—	—	—
1955–56	Springfield Indians	AHL	11	4	7	0	660	57	0	5.18	—	—	—	—	—	—	—	—
1955–56	Trois-Rivières Lions	QSHL	14	6	8	0	852	48	1	3.38	—	—	—	—	—	—	—	—
1955–56	New York Rangers	NHL	—	—	—	—	—	—	—	—	2	1	1	—	120	9	0	4.50
1956–57	Trois-Rivières Lions	QSHL	4	2	1	1	250	10	0	2.40	—	—	—	—	—	—	—	—
1956–57	Belleville McFarlands	OHA Sr	41	19	17	5	2460	154	0	3.75	9	4	5	0	540	30	2	3.33
1957–58	Belleville McFarlands	OHA Sr	49	29	17	3	2940	176	4	3.59	30	21	8	1	1817	81	3	2.67
1957–58	Belleville McFarlands	Al-Cup	—	—	—	—	—	—	—	—	14	10	4	—	850	43	1	3.04
1958–59	Belleville McFarlands	OHA Sr	46	—	—	—	2760	156	2	3.39	—	—	—	—	—	—	—	—
1959–60	Belleville McFarlands	OHA Sr	9	—	—	—	500	39	0	4.68	—	—	—	—	—	—	—	—
NHL totals			8	3	5	0	480	31	0	3.88	2	1	1	—	120	15	0	7.50

=== International ===
Year	Team	Event	GP	W	L	T	MIN	GA	SO	GAA
1959	Canada	WC	6	5	1	0	360	9	2	1.50
Senior totals			6	5	1	0	360	9	2	1.50

== Awards and achievements ==
- Turnbull Cup (MJHL) Championship (1942)
- Memorial Cup Championship (1942)
- Calder Cup (AHL) Championship (1943)
- AHL First All-Star Team (1943)
- USHL Second All-Star Team (1949)
- Honoured Member of the Manitoba Hockey Hall of Fame
