= John McLellan (ice hockey) =

Canadian ice hockey player and coach

- Born: August 6, 1928 South Porcupine, Ontario, Canada
- Died: October 27, 1979 (aged 51) Agincourt, Toronto, Ontario, Canada
- Height: 5 ft 11 in (180 cm)
- Weight: 150 lb (68 kg; 10 st 10 lb)
- Position: Centre
- Shot: Left
- Played for: Toronto Maple Leafs
- National team: Canada
- Playing career: 1947–1965

Daniel John McLellan (August 6, 1928 – October 27, 1979) was a Canadian professional hockey player and coach in the National Hockey League (NHL). He was a member of teams that won the Memorial Cup, the Allan Cup and the world championships.

== Playing career ==
Born in South Porcupine, Ontario (now part of Timmins), McLellan was signed by the Toronto Maple Leafs and brought to Toronto to play for the St. Michael's Buzzers (1945–46) and then the St. Michael's Majors, playing on the team that won the Memorial Cup in 1947. As a senior, McLellan played three seasons with the Toronto Marlboros, winning the Allan Cup in 1950. Both of McLellan's cup victories came under coach Joe Primeau.

McLellan turned professional in 1950, and would play most of the next four seasons with the Pittsburgh Hornets, the Maple Leafs' American Hockey League affiliate. In 1950–51, he also played for the Tulsa Oilers of the United States Hockey League. McLellan was called up to the Maple Leafs for two games in 1951–52, and they would be his only games as a player in the NHL.

He was traded by the Leafs to the AHL Cleveland Barons in September 1954, and played there for four years. In May 1958, the Barons told him he could make his own deal to join another team. For the 1958–59 season, McLellan was reinstated as an amateur and played for the Belleville McFarlands. The team represented Canada at the 1959 Ice Hockey World Championships, winning gold.

McLellan played in other minor professional leagues through the rest of his career, playing for the Milwaukee Falcons of the International Hockey League in 1959–60 and the Timmins Flyers of the Northern Ontario Hockey League in 1960–61. In 1962, he joined the Nashville Dixie Flyers of the Eastern Hockey League and played there for two seasons, before retiring as a player and becoming coach of the Nashville team.

== Coaching career ==
After two years coaching in Nashville–winning the league championship both seasons—McLellan rejoined the Maple Leafs organization in 1967 as the head coach of their top minor league affiliate, the Tulsa Oilers of the Central Hockey League. He spent two years in Tulsa and was then brought back to the NHL in 1969 to succeed the fired Punch Imlach as head coach of the Toronto Maple Leafs. McLellan was coach of the Leafs for four seasons—missing 15 games in 1971–72 due to a duodenal ulcer. He was voted NHL coach of the year in 1971. McLellan resigned as coach in 1973 to become the Leafs' assistant general manager.

In 1977, Imlach offered him the head coaching job with the Buffalo Sabres, but McLellan declined. The two were briefly reunited in Toronto when Imlach rejoined the Maple Leafs in 1979. A few months later, the 51-year-old McLellan died from an apparent heart attack after raking leaves at his home in Agincourt, Toronto.

== Career statistics ==
=== Regular season and playoffs ===
			Regular season					Playoffs
Season	Team	League	GP	G	A	Pts	PIM	GP	G	A	Pts	PIM
1945–46	St. Michael's Buzzers	OHA-B	8	4	1	5	6	2	0	1	1	0
1946–47	St. Michael's Majors	OHA	30	11	13	24	8	9	0	0	0	0
1946–47	St. Michael's Majors	M-Cup	—	—	—	—	—	8	1	3	4	2
1947–48	Toronto Marlboros	OHA Sr	36	16	26	42	45	5	1	2	3	8
1948–49	Toronto Marlboros	OHA Sr	36	11	19	30	38	10	7	6	13	8
1948–49	Toronto Marlboros	Al-Cup	—	—	—	—	—	13	9	9	18	12
1949–50	Toronto Marlboros	OHA Sr	36	12	20	32	41	14	3	7	10	14
1949–50	Toronto Marlboros	Al-Cup	—	—	—	—	—	17	7	8	15	15
1950–51	Pittsburgh Hornets	AHL	37	8	6	14	23	—	—	—	—	—
1950–51	Tulsa Oilers	USHL	14	9	5	14	16	9	4	1	5	9
1951–52	Toronto Maple Leafs	NHL	2	0	0	0	0	—	—	—	—	—
1951–52	Pittsburgh Hornets	AHL	60	21	22	43	43	11	1	1	2	12
1952–53	Pittsburgh Hornets	AHL	51	13	24	37	59	10	2	2	4	0
1953–54	Pittsburgh Hornets	AHL	55	8	16	24	72	2	0	0	0	0
1954–55	Cleveland Barons	AHL	60	30	31	61	97	4	1	1	2	4
1955–56	Cleveland Barons	AHL	61	12	12	24	72	5	3	1	4	8
1956–57	Cleveland Barons	AHL	57	20	13	33	83	12	7	2	9	12
1957–58	Cleveland Barons	AHL	46	11	15	26	53	4	0	0	0	2
1958–59	Belleville McFarlands	OHA Sr	45	17	27	44	74	—	—	—	—	—
1959–60	Belleville McFarlands	OHA Sr	—	—	—	—	—	—	—	—	—	—
1959–60	Milwaukee Falcons	IHL	23	7	18	25	29	—	—	—	—	—
1960–61	Rouyn-Noranda Alouettes	Al-Cup	—	—	—	—	—	3	2	1	3	4
1962–63	Nashville Dixie Flyers	EHL	58	19	37	56	46	3	0	2	2	2
1963–64	Nashville Dixie Flyers	EHL	1	0	0	0	0	—	—	—	—	—
1964–65	Nashville Dixie Flyers	EHL	—	—	—	—	—	—	—	—	—	—
AHL totals			427	123	139	262	502	48	14	7	21	38
NHL totals			2	0	0	0	0	—	—	—	—	—

=== International ===
Year	Team	Event	GP	G	A	Pts	PIM
1959	Canada	WC	7	4	7	11	10
Senior totals			7	4	7	11	10

== Coaching record ==
Team	Year	Regular Season						Post Season
Team	Year	G	W	L	T	Pts	Finish	Result
Toronto Maple Leafs	1969–70	76	29	34	13	71	6th in East	Did not qualify
Toronto Maple Leafs	1970–71	78	37	33	8	82	4th in East	Lost in quarter-finals
Toronto Maple Leafs	1971–72	78	33	31	14	80	4th in East	Lost in quarter-finals
Toronto Maple Leafs	1972–73	78	27	41	10	64	6th in East	Did not qualify
NHL Totals		310	126	139	45	297		

Preceded by Punch Imlach	Head coach of the Toronto Maple Leafs; 1969–73	Succeeded by Red Kelly
