= Belleville McFarlands =

Canadian senior ice hockey team (1956–61)

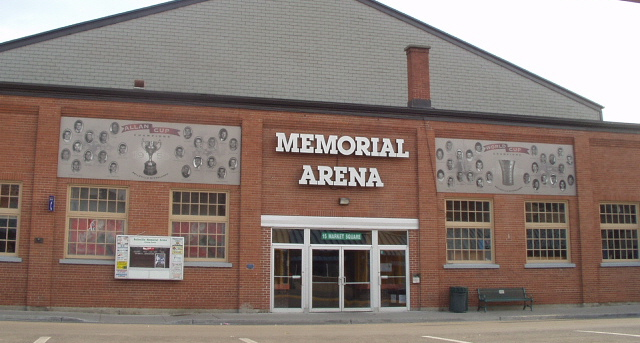
The Belleville Memorial Arena was home to the McFarlands. Allan Cup and World Championship posters on display above the front entrance.

The Belleville McFarlands were a Canadian senior ice hockey team in the Ontario Hockey Association (OHA) from 1956 to 1961. The McFarlands were based out of Belleville, Ontario, playing home games at the Belleville Memorial Arena.

== History ==
The McFarlands played in the OHA Senior A League and won the J. Ross Robertson Cup as league champions in 1958. The McFarlands also won the 1958 Allan Cup, defeating the Kelowna Packers four games to three. The following season, they represented Canada at the Ice Hockey World Championships, in Czechoslovakia winning the gold medal at the 1959 World Championship. The team won eight of nine games, including a final-round match versus the Soviet Union. Their only loss at the event came on the last day of the tournament versus the host Czechs when they already had first place clinched.

Games were broadcast on CJBQ radio by Jack Devine, including the world championship game in Prague.

The team name was revived by a later team in the Eastern Ontario Senior Hockey League from 2003 to 2006, known as the Belleville Macs.

== NHL alumni ==
Fifteen alumni of the McFarlands also played professionally in the National Hockey League.

- Frank Bathgate
- Gordie Bell
- Red Berenson
- Barton Bradley
- Wayne Brown
- Pete Conacher
- Al Dewsbury
- Gerry Goyer
- Bep Guidolin
- Ike Hildebrand
- Jean Lamirande
- John McLellan
- Hillary Menard
- Tony Poeta
- Rags Raglan

== 1959 roster ==
- Gordie Bell, Maurice Benoit, Red Berenson, Denis Boucher, Barton Bradley, Wayne Brown, Pete Conacher, Floyd Crawford, Al Dewsbury, Marv Edwards, Ike Hildebrand, Jean Lamirande, John McLellan, Jean-Paul Payette, Lou Smrke

== Season-by-season results ==
Ontario Hockey Association regular season competition results.

Season	Games	Won	Lost	Tied	Points	Winning Pct. (%)	Goals for	Goals against	Notes
1956–57	52	23	24	5	49	49.0	216	206	
1957–58	52	29	20	3	61	58.7	214	195	won J. Ross Robertson Cup, won the Allan Cup
1958–59	48	27	13	8	62	64.6	215	160	representing Canada, won the 1959 Ice Hockey World Championships
1959–60	54	18	35	1	39	34.3	196	262	
1960–61	Data unavailable.								
