= Floyd Crawford =

Canadian ice hockey player

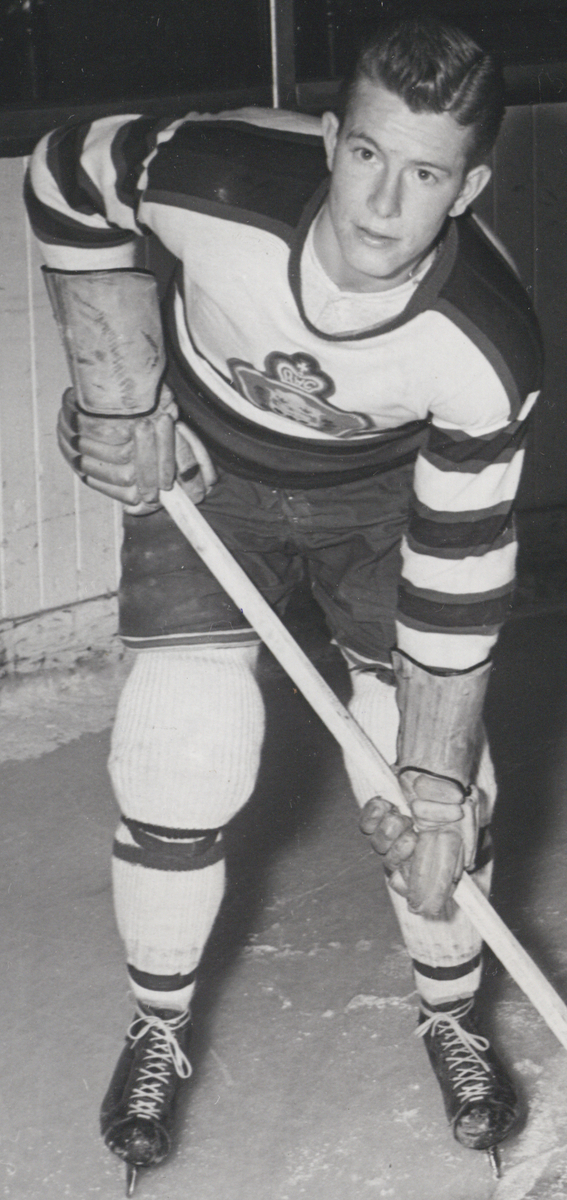
- Born: November 28, 1928 Toronto, Ontario, Canada
- Died: November 11, 2017 (aged 88) Belleville, Ontario
- Height: 5 ft 11 in (180 cm)
- Weight: 190 lb (86 kg; 13 st 8 lb)
- Position: Right wing
- Shot: Left
- Played for: Belleville McFarlands; Chicoutimi Sagueneens
- National team: Canada
- Playing career: 1944–1960
Medal record
Men's ice hockey
| Gold medal – first place | 1959 Prague | Ice hockey |

Floyd Stone "Pete" Crawford (November 28, 1928 – November 11, 2017) was a Canadian ice hockey player with the Belleville McFarlands. He won a gold medal at the 1959 World Ice Hockey Championships in Prague. He is the father of former NHLers Lou, Bob and Marc Crawford.
