= Al Dewsbury =

Canadian ice hockey player

- Born: April 12, 1926; Goderich, Ontario, Canada
- Died: December 16, 2006 (aged 80); Markham, Ontario, Canada
- Height: 6 ft 2 in (188 cm)
- Weight: 202 lb (92 kg; 14 st 6 lb)
- Position: Defence
- Shot: Left
- Played for: Detroit Red Wings; Chicago Black Hawks
- National team: Canada
- Playing career: 1943–1959

Albert Percy "Dews" Dewsbury (April 12, 1926 – December 16, 2006) was a Canadian ice hockey defenceman. He played in the National Hockey League with the Detroit Red Wings and Chicago Black Hawks between 1946 and 1956. He was born in Goderich, Ontario.

== Career statistics ==
=== Regular season and playoffs ===
			Regular season					Playoffs
Season	Team	League	GP	G	A	Pts	PIM	GP	G	A	Pts	PIM
1941–42	Toronto Young Rangers	OHA	—	—	—	—	—	—	—	—	—	—
1941–42	Toronto Native Sons	OHA	1	0	0	0	0	—	—	—	—	—
1942–43	Toronto Young Rangers	OHA	—	—	—	—	—	—	—	—	—	—
1943–44	Toronto Young Rangers	OHA	19	12	8	20	34	—	—	—	—	—
1943–44	Toronto CIL	TIHL	11	10	6	16	12	7	2	3	5	2
1943–44	Hamilton Whizzers	OHA	—	—	—	—	—	3	1	0	1	0
1944–45	Toronto Young Rangers	OHA	19	12	8	20	34	4	0	0	0	8
1944–45	Toronto Fuels	TMHL	9	1	3	4	24	—	—	—	—	—
1944–45	Toronto Maher Jewels	TIHL	3	0	0	0	0	—	—	—	—	—
1944–45	Porcupine Combines	M-Cup	—	—	—	—	—	3	0	0	0	2
1945–46	Omaha Knights	USHL	41	6	6	12	28	7	1	2	3	0
1946–47	Detroit Red Wings	NHL	23	2	1	3	12	2	0	0	0	4
1946–47	Indianapolis Capitals	AHL	34	6	4	10	80	—	—	—	—	—
1947–48	Indianapolis Capitals	AHL	10	0	4	4	34	—	—	—	—	—
1947–48	Omaha Knights	USHL	32	11	7	18	57	3	0	2	2	9
1947–48	Detroit Red Wings	NHL	—	—	—	—	—	1	0	0	0	0
1948–49	Indianapolis Capitals	AHL	65	8	24	32	103	2	0	2	2	0
1949–50	Detroit Red Wings	NHL	11	2	2	4	2	5	0	3	3	8
1949–50	Indianapolis Capitals	AHL	30	15	22	37	55	8	2	5	7	16
1950–51	Chicago Black Hawks	NHL	67	5	14	19	79	—	—	—	—	—
1951–52	Chicago Black Hawks	NHL	69	7	17	24	99	—	—	—	—	—
1952–53	Chicago Black Hawks	NHL	69	5	16	21	97	7	1	2	3	4
1953–54	Chicago Black Hawks	NHL	69	6	15	21	44	—	—	—	—	—
1954–55	Chicago Black Hawks	NHL	12	0	1	1	10	—	—	—	—	—
1954–55	Montreal Royals	QSHL	41	7	9	16	80	14	3	2	5	34
1955–56	Chicago Black Hawks	NHL	37	3	12	15	22	—	—	—	—	—
1955–56	Buffalo Bisons	AHL	31	8	18	26	48	5	0	3	3	4
1956–57	Hershey Bears	AHL	59	6	31	37	101	5	0	0	0	2
1957–58	Hershey Bears	AHL	60	7	31	38	114	1	0	0	0	0
1958–59	Belleville McFarlands	OHA Sr	40	7	31	38	114	—	—	—	—	—
NHL totals			357	30	78	108	365	15	1	5	6	16

=== International ===
Year	Team	Event	GP	G	A	Pts	PIM
1959	Canada	WC	8	3	2	5	28
Senior totals			8	3	2	5	28

== Awards and achievements ==
- 1950 Stanley Cup Championship (Detroit Red Wings)
- 1950 Calder Cup Championship (Indianapolis Capitals)
- 1951 NHL All Star (Chicago Black Hawks)
- 1958 Calder Cup Championship (Hershey Bears)
- 1959 World Championship (Belleville McFarlands)
