= Marv Edwards =

Canadian ice hockey player (1934–2023)

- Born: August 15, 1934 St. Catharines, Ontario, Canada
- Died: May 20, 2023 (aged 88) St. Catharines, Ontario, Canada
- Height: 5 ft 8 in (173 cm)
- Weight: 155 lb (70 kg; 11 st 1 lb)
- Position: Goaltender
- Caught: Left
- Played for: Pittsburgh Penguins; Toronto Maple Leafs; California Golden Seals
- National team: Canada
- Playing career: 1955–1974

Marvin Wayne Edwards (August 15, 1934 – May 20, 2023) was a Canadian ice hockey goaltender. He played 61 games in the National Hockey League with the Pittsburgh Penguins, Toronto Maple Leafs, and California Golden Seals between 1969 and 1974. The rest of his career, which lasted from 1955 to 1974, was spent in various minor leagues, professional and amateur. Internationally, Edwards played for Canada "Belleville McFarlands" at the 1959 World Championships, winning a gold medal.

== Playing career ==
=== Junior ===
Edwards was born in St. Catharines, Ontario and played with local teams before joining the Ontario Hockey Association's St. Catharines Teepees from 1951 to 1955, culminating with a triple win of the J. Ross Robertson Cup (OHL), George Richardson Memorial Trophy over Quebec Amateur Hockey Association Champion Quebec Frontenacs for the Eastern Canada Championship, and then the 1954 Memorial Cup as Canadian Junior Hockey Champions over Edmonton Oil Kings. This was the Teepees first Memorial Cup, but not for Edwards; the previous spring, he was added to the 1953 Memorial Cup roster for the Barrie Flyers, replacing an injured Bill Harrington, and he led this team to victory over the St. Boniface Canadiens.

=== Senior ===
Edwards moved into the OHL Senior ranks in Chatham, Ontario playing with the Chatham Maroons. In his rookie season, he lost the Allan Cup to Vernon Canadians, and remained another season, before moving to the nearby Windsor Bulldogs. In 1958–59, he went to North Bay, Ontario o play for the short-lived North Bay Trappers. The defending Allan Cup champions Belleville McFarlands required an additional goalie for the 1959 Ice Hockey World Championships, and Edwards took the position; the team won the Gold.

The following year, he turned professional, and began a minor league career, that led up to the NHL Expansion.

Edwards started his National Hockey League career with the Pittsburgh Penguins in 1968 after playing for several seasons with the Nashville Dixie Flyers of the Eastern Hockey League, where in his best season he led that circuit with 15 shutouts. He also later played with the Toronto Maple Leafs and California Golden Seals. He retired after the 1973–74 season, at the age of 41.

He later served as a goaltender coach with the OHL Peterborough Petes in the 1990s.

== Death ==
Edwards died on May 20, 2023, at the age of 88.

== Career statistics ==
=== Regular season and playoffs ===
			Regular season									Playoffs
Season	Team	League	GP	W	L	T	MIN	GA	SO	GAA	SV%	GP	W	L	T	MIN	GA	SO	GAA	SV%
1950–51	St. Catharines Teepees	OHA	1	0	1	0	60	11	0	11.00	—	—	—	—	—	—	—	—	—	—
1951–52	St. Catharines Teepees	OHA	48	—	—	—	2880	198	2	4.13	—	13	7	6	0	780	47	0	3.62	—
1952–53	St. Catharines Teepees	OHA	36	—	—	—	2160	149	2	4.14	—	1	—	—	—	60	5	0	5.00	—
1952–53	Barrie Flyers	M-Cup	—	—	—	—	—	—	—	—	—	10	8	2	0	600	37	0	3.70	—
1953–54	St. Catharines Teepees	OHA	49	—	—	—	—	—	—	3.71	—	15	—	—	—	900	55	1	3.67	—
1953–54	St. Catharines Teepees	M-Cup	—	—	—	—	—	—	—	—	—	11	8	2	1	670	28	0	2.51	—
1954–55	St. Catharines Teepees	OHA	47	32	13	2	2820	162	1	3.45	—	6	—	—	—	360	20	0	3.33	—
1954–55	Buffalo Bisons	AHL	2	1	1	0	120	6	0	3.00	—	—	—	—	—	—	—	—	—	—
1955–56	Chatham Maroons	OHA Sr	34	—	—	—	2040	158	0	4.72	—	11	8	3	0	660	38	0	3.45	—
1955–56	Chatham Maroons	Al-Cup	—	—	—	—	—	—	—	—	—	17	8	7	2	1040	55	0	3.17	—
1956–57	Chatham Maroons	OHA Sr	52	28	22	2	3120	183	5	3.52	—	6	2	4	0	360	14	0	2.33	—
1956–57	Calgary Stampeders	WHL	2	0	2	0	119	5	0	2.52	—	—	—	—	—	—	—	—	—	—
1956–57	Buffalo Bisons	AHL	1	0	1	0	60	4	0	4.00	—	—	—	—	—	—	—	—	—	—
1957–58	Windsor Bulldogs	OHA Sr	57	25	30	2	3420	213	1	3.73	—	13	7	4	2	780	42	1	3.23	—
1957–58	Buffalo Bisons	AHL	2	0	2	0	120	10	0	5.00	—	—	—	—	—	—	—	—	—	—
1958–59	North Bay Trappers	OHA Sr	35	—	—	—	2100	180	0	5.14	—	—	—	—	—	—	—	—	—	—
1959–60	Milwaukee Falcons	IHL	64	24	39	1	3840	296	3	4.62	—	—	—	—	—	—	—	—	—	—
1959–60	Minneapolis Millers	IHL	—	—	—	—	—	—	—	—	—	6	2	4	—	360	17	1	2.83	—
1960–61	Johnstown Jets	EHL	64	40	22	2	3840	215	4	3.36	—	12	10	2	—	720	18	4	1.50	—
1960–61	New Haven Blades	EHL	1	—	—	—	60	3	0	3.00	—	—	—	—	—	—	—	—	—	—
1961–62	Johnstown Jets	EHL	55	—	—	—	3300	193	3	3.51	—	—	—	—	—	—	—	—	—	—
1962–63	Knoxville Knights	EHL	1	1	0	0	60	1	0	1.00	—	—	—	—	—	—	—	—	—	—
1962–63	Nashville Dixie Flyers	EHL	68	16	48	4	4080	262	1	3.85	—	3	0	3	—	184	13	0	4.24	—
1963–64	Nashville Dixie Flyers	EHL	70	37	29	4	4200	230	5	3.29	—	3	0	3	—	180	14	0	4.67	—
1963–64	Clinton Comets	EHL	—	—	—	—	—	—	—	—	—	3	2	1	—	180	9	0	3.00	—
1964–65	Nashville Dixie Flyers	EHL	71	54	17	0	4260	193	1	2.72	—	13	8	5	—	780	34	1	2.62	—
1965–66	Nashville Dixie Flyers	EHL	71	42	22	7	4260	174	7	2.45	—	11	11	0	—	660	13	2	1.18	—
1966–67	Nashville Dixie Flyers	EHL	72	51	19	2	4320	168	6	2.33	—	14	11	3	—	840	29	1	2.07	—
1967–68	Portland Buckaroos	WHL	40	21	16	2	2366	93	4	2.36	—	5	1	4	—	328	16	1	2.93	—
1968–69	Pittsburgh Penguins	NHL	1	0	1	0	60	3	0	3.00	.909	—	—	—	—	—	—	—	—	—
1968–69	Amarillo Wranglers	CHL	39	—	—	—	2190	116	1	3.18	—	—	—	—	—	—	—	—	—	—
1968–69	Baltimore Clippers	AHL	14	6	7	1	839	42	2	3.00	—	4	1	3	—	200	13	0	3.90	—
1969–70	Toronto Maple Leafs	NHL	25	10	9	4	1419	77	1	3.26	.910	—	—	—	—	—	—	—	—	—
1970–71	Phoenix Roadrunners	WHL	53	27	17	6	2949	157	2	3.19	—	7	3	4	—	410	24	0	3.51	—
1971–72	Phoenix Roadrunners	WHL	35	19	11	3	1891	103	1	3.26	—	3	1	2	—	186	11	0	3.55	—
1972–73	California Golden Seals	NHL	21	4	14	2	1205	87	1	4.33	.874	—	—	—	—	—	—	—	—	—
1973–74	California Golden Seals	NHL	14	1	10	1	778	51	0	3.93	.889	—	—	—	—	—	—	—	—	—
NHL totals			61	15	34	7	3462	218	2	3.78	.893	—	—	—	—	—	—	—	—	—

=== International ===
Year	Team	Event	GP	W	L	T	MIN	GA	SO	GAA	SV%
1959	Canada	WC	2	2	0	0	120	0	2	0.00	1.000
Senior totals			2	2	0	0	120	0	2	0.00	1.000
