= CJTN-FM =

Radio station in Trenton–Belleville, Ontario

Coordinates: 44°07′42″N 77°39′41″W

- Trenton, Ontario; Canada
- Broadcast area: Belleville-Quinte West
- Frequency: 107.1 MHz
- Branding: Rock 107

Programming
- Format: Classic rock
- Affiliations: United Stations Radio Networks; Westwood One

Ownership
- Owner: Quinte Broadcasting
- Sister stations: CJBQ, CIGL-FM

History
- First air date: January 22, 1979
- Former frequencies: 1270 kHz (1979–2004)
- Call sign meaning: Trenton

Technical information
- Licensing authority: CRTC
- Class: B
- ERP: 3,640 watts (average); 15,000 watts (peak)
- HAAT: 185.7 metres (609 ft)

Links
- Webcast: Listen live
- Website: rock107.ca

CJTN-FM is a radio station in Trenton, Ontario, broadcasting on the assigned frequency of 107.1 MHz, serving Belleville and the Quinte region. Owned by Quinte Broadcasting, the station airs a classic rock music format branded as Rock 107.

== History ==
On June 5, 1978, Quinte Broadcasting Company Limited received CRTC approval to operate a new English language AM radio station at Trenton, Ontario, on the frequency of 1270 kHz with a power of 1,000 watts day and night. The station began broadcasting on 1270 kHz on January 22, 1979, with a power of 1,000 watts, to service Trenton; hence the TN in the call sign. Ted Snider was the station's first manager. The original AM transmitter was located at Carrying Place, just south of Trenton. CJTN moved to its current frequency at 107.1 FM on August 16, 2004, and was branded as Lite 107 with an adult contemporary format. The station changed to a classic rock format on May 18, 2007, and was re-branded as Rock 107.

CJTN's weekday line-up consists of The Morning Buzz with Buzz Collins featuring Tim Durkin. Rick Kevan hosts afternoons. Special feature shows include The House of Hair with Dee Snider on Friday nights, The Acoustic Storm with Jeff Parets on Saturday mornings, Flashback with Max Pinfield on Saturday nights and Sunday mornings and weekend afternoons with Greg Moulton and Scott Hunter. In August 2019, veteran announcer Rick Kevan celebrated 40 years with Quinte Broadcasting.

CJTN's transmitter is located near Wooler Road and Highway 401, northwest of Trenton. Its signal is directional, to avoid co-channel interference to the west with CILQ-FM in Toronto.
