= Jim Powers (ice hockey) =

Canadian ice hockey player (1936–2026)

- Born: September 30, 1936 Claresholm, Alberta, Canada
- Died: August 13, 2026 (aged 89) Mill Creek, Washington, U.S.
- Height: 5 ft 8 in (173 cm)
- Weight: 165 lb (75 kg; 11 st 11 lb)
- Position: Left wing
- Shot: Left
- Played for: Vancouver Canucks; Los Angeles Blades; Seattle Totems; Providence Reds
- Playing career: 1953–1970

James Leroy Powers (September 30, 1936 – August 13, 2026) was a Canadian professional ice hockey player who played for the Vancouver Canucks, Los Angeles Blades, and Seattle Totems of the Western Hockey League, totaling 854 games in that league. He also played one season for the Providence Reds in the American Hockey League. Powers died in Mill Creek, Washington on August 13, 2026, at the age of 89.
