= Jean Lamirande =

Canadian ice hockey player

- Born: August 20, 1923 Shawinigan Falls, Quebec, Canada
- Died: January 30, 1976 (aged 52)
- Height: 5 ft 8 in (173 cm)
- Weight: 170 lb (77 kg; 12 st 2 lb)
- Position: Left wing
- Shot: Right
- Played for: New York Rangers; Montreal Canadiens
- National team: Canada
- Playing career: 1943–1961

Jean Lamirande
Medal record

Representing Canada

World Championships
Gold medal – first place	1959 Czechoslovakia	
Gold medal – first place	1958 Norway	

Joseph Jean-Paul "J. P." Lamirande (August 20, 1923 – January 30, 1976) was a Canadian professional ice hockey player. He played 49 games in the National Hockey League for the New York Rangers and Montreal Canadiens between 1946 and 1957. The rest of his career, which lasted from 1943 to 1961, was spent in the minor leagues. He was born in Shawinigan Falls, Quebec. Lamirande also played for the Canadian national team at the 1958 and 1959 World Championships. Canada won the gold medal both times and Lamirande was named the tournament's top defenceman in 1959.

== Career statistics ==
=== Regular season and playoffs ===
			Regular season					Playoffs
Season	Team	League	GP	G	A	Pts	PIM	GP	G	A	Pts	PIM
1943–44	Montreal Army	MCHL	2	0	0	0	0	2	0	0	0	2
1944–45	Montreal Cyclones	MCHL	12	2	8	10	—	—	—	—	—	—
1944–45	Montreal Army	MCHL	14	3	5	8	10	3	0	0	0	2
1945–46	Montreal Royals	QSHL	36	6	8	14	60	9	2	2	4	22
1946–47	New York Rangers	NHL	14	1	1	2	14	—	—	—	—	—
1946–47	New Haven Ramblers	AHL	4	0	1	1	6	—	—	—	—	—
1946–47	St. Paul Saints	USHL	26	0	4	4	18	—	—	—	—	—
1947–48	New York Rangers	NHL	18	0	1	1	6	6	0	0	0	4
1947–48	New Haven Ramblers	AHL	46	7	20	27	22	—	—	—	—	—
1948–49	New Haven Ramblers	AHL	30	3	7	10	18	—	—	—	—	—
1949–50	New York Rangers	NHL	16	4	3	7	6	2	0	0	0	0
1949–50	New Haven Ramblers	AHL	52	26	31	57	16	—	—	—	—	—
1950–51	St. Louis Flyers	AHL	64	13	36	49	6	—	—	—	—	—
1951–52	Chicoutimi Sagueneens	QSHL	58	11	28	39	32	18	2	7	9	4
1952–53	Chicoutimi Sagueneens	QSHL	56	4	19	23	36	20	2	6	8	17
1953–54	Chicoutimi Sagueneens	QSHL	68	5	22	27	65	7	0	0	0	4
1954–55	Montreal Canadiens	NHL	1	0	0	0	0	—	—	—	—	—
1954–55	Shawinigan Falls Cataractes	QSHL	60	3	29	32	59	11	2	4	6	8
1955–56	Shawinigan Falls Cataractes	QSHL	58	6	16	22	44	11	1	2	3	10
1956–57	Quebec Aces	QSHL	67	4	14	18	52	10	0	5	5	6
1957–58	Quebec Aces	QSHL	45	3	16	19	24	13	1	2	3	6
1958–59	Belleville McFarlands	OHA Sr	20	5	8	13	10	—	—	—	—	—
1959–60	Windsor Bulldogs	OHA Sr	49	6	16	22	50	14	0	4	4	2
1960–61	Kingston Frontenacs	EPHL	2	0	1	1	2	—	—	—	—	—
1960–61	Clinton Comets	EHL	52	6	27	33	22	4	0	1	1	7
QSHL totals			448	42	152	194	372	99	10	28	38	77
NHL totals			49	5	5	10	26	8	0	0	0	4

=== International ===
Year	Team	Event	GP	G	A	Pts	PIM
1958	Canada	WC	7	0	6	6	2
1959	Canada	WC	8	1	4	5	0
Senior totals			15	1	10	11	2
