= Jack Miller (sportscaster) =

Canadian sportscaster and politician

Jack Miller is a Canadian sportscaster and politician born and raised in Cornwall, Ontario.

Miller was hired by CJBQ-AM in Belleville, Ontario as the afternoon drive announcer 1974, working alongside Jack Devine. He took over the sports director position in 1979 and became the play-by-play voice of the Ontario Hockey League's Belleville Bulls in 1981 and has remained in those positions ever since.

Miller also hosted the "OHL game of the week" on the Global Television Network until it was sold to CFMT. Miller has also worked for Rogers Sportsnet as a play-by-play announcer for Canadian Hockey League Broadcasts in the late 1990s and early 2000s. Miller was the back up colour commentator and play-by-play voice for the Ottawa Senators radio network during the late 1990s and early 2000s. Miller also served as the colour commentator and intermission host of Hockey Canada's broadcast IIHF under 20 ( World Junior Hockey Tournament) on the FAN radio Network which was heard on the networks flagship station the FAN590, Miller's home station 800 CJBQ-AM in Belleville, and numerous other stations across the country, until the broadcast rights switched to the TSN Radio Networks. On these broadcasts, Miller worked with Dan Dunleavy.

In November 2006, Miller was elected to Belleville City Council. He had previously served as a member of the Belleville Police Services Board.
