= Jack Devine (ice hockey) =

Canadian ice hockey administrator and radio personality (1919–1989)

- Born: February 22, 1919; Toronto, Ontario, Canada
- Died: April 27, 1989 (aged 70); Belleville, Ontario, Canada
- Occupation: CJBQ sports director
- Years active: 1945–1984
- Known for: Canadian Amateur Hockey Association and Ontario Hockey Association president
- Awards: Belleville Sports Hall of Fame
- Military career
- Allegiance: Canada
- Branch: Royal Canadian Air Force
- Battles / wars: World War II

William John Devine (February 22, 1919 – April 27, 1989) was a Canadian ice hockey administrator and radio sports commentator. He worked for CJBQ radio in Belleville, Ontario for 40 years as the sports director. He was involved with the local sports scene, and was president of the Ontario Hockey Association from 1967 to 1969. He moved up to the national level in 1969 becoming vice-president of the Canadian Amateur Hockey Association (CAHA) in 1969, and later served as its president from 1973 to 1975.

Devine was president of the CAHA during a period when the National Hockey League and the World Hockey Association were competing for junior ice hockey players. He spent significant time over two years negotiating the drafting and development agreements with the respective professional leagues. He oversaw the split of Canadian Junior A hockey into Tier 1 and Tier 2, and the subsequent draft system. He helped lay the groundwork for a national midget hockey tournament which later became the Telus Cup. He was involved in planning both the 1974 Summit Series, and the 1975 World Junior Ice Hockey Championships partially hosted in Canada. He was part of the negotiations for Canada returning to play at the Ice Hockey World Championships, and the planning stages of what became the Canada Cup. He later represented Canada at the International Ice Hockey Federation, and was inducted into the Belleville Sports Hall of Fame.

== Early life ==
William John Devine was born on February 22, 1919, in Toronto, Ontario. He was the son of John James Devine, and later served in the Royal Canadian Air Force during World War II.

== Radio career and local sports ==
Starting in 1945, he was the sports director at CJBQ radio in Belleville, Ontario, for forty years until 1984. It was the first radio station in Belleville, and Devine was its first employee. He was the sports commentator for the local Belleville McFarlands ice hockey team, and travelled with them to Prague, and broadcast the game in which Belleville won the 1959 Ice Hockey World Championships. On August 20, 1960, Devine broadcast the Harmsworth Cup race for motorboats, won by the Canadian entry Miss Supertest III. He was known for finishing on-air broadcasts by saying, "to play a sport, you must be one". Devine later worked with Jack Miller, who would be his replacement at CJBQ.

Devine also served as a president of the Eastern Ontario branch of Baseball Ontario, and was a commander of the Bay of Quinte Power Boat Squadron. He also served terms as president of the Ontario Sports Writers Association, and the Ontario Sportscasters Association.

== Ontario Hockey Association ==
Devine was elected to the Ontario Hockey Association (OHA) board of directors in 1959. He served as the OHA president from 1967 to 1969, succeeding Matt Leyden. Devine was in charge of settling the protested 1967 OHA Junior D Championship between the Tweed-Madoc Twins and the Mitchell Hawks. Mitchell protested the eligibility of five players, the lack of a scoreclock, the lack of a washroom in the visiting dressing room, and illegal goal posts. Devine ruled the five players eligible based on residency rules, and was able to get suitable upgrades to the arena to resume the series.

Devine chaired the OHA committee which considered the application of the Western Ontario Junior B Hockey League to become a Junior A league in June 1968, but declined it due to the lateness of the application, and recommended the group remain as Junior B. The league instead proposed to operate outside of the OHA jurisdiction, and Devine warned the league of possible ramifications. He also urged local Belleville goaltender prodigy Steve Rexe to play for Canada men's national ice hockey team.

Devine was succeeded by Tubby Schmalz as OHA president in 1972.

== CAHA vice-president ==
Devine was elected the Canadian Amateur Hockey Association (CAHA) vice-president in charge of junior ice hockey on May 23, 1969, at the annual meeting. He served two years in the capacity, being re-elected at the 1970 meeting. During this time he oversaw competition for the Memorial Cup and its scheduling. He also worked on the disagreement between the Western Canada Hockey League (WCHL) and the CAHA regarding the use of overage players and distribution of development funds from the National Hockey League (NHL), which led the WCHL to leave the CAHA's jurisdiction. He stated the present draft agreement with the NHL expires in 1972, and it sets the upper age limit on junior hockey at 20, whereas the WCHL wanted it to be 21. Devine later said that the CAHA would also reevaluate its junior league classifications at the upcoming general meeting.

At the 1970 CAHA general meeting, Devine proposed splitting junior hockey into tiers for better balance, and felt that too many leagues classified themselves as Junior A, just to compete for the Memorial Cup. CAHA delegates initially disagreed over the amount of development money from the NHL, that was allocated to the leagues under Devine's tiered proposal. His proposal was successfully implemented for the 1970–71 season, and including a draft system where Tier 1 Junior A teams were able to draft players from Tier 2 Junior A teams.

At the 1971 CAHA general meeting, Devine was elected first vice-president of the CAHA, and served in that role for two years. The WCHL requested to revisit his tiered draft configuration, and wanted an exemption from the restrictions on inter-provincial transfers, since its league operates in three provinces. Devine agreed and proposed the NHL draft payments for players at American colleges, be distributed to the last Canadian club for which the draftee played. He also led the CAHA into more involvement in minor ice hockey and skills development, after seeing the results of the Soviet Union's development system during the 1972 Summit Series.

== CAHA president ==
=== First term ===
Devine succeeded Joe Kryczka as president of the CAHA, at the annual meeting on May 25, 1973. Devine aimed to put the fun back into hockey for children, and felt that hockey parents in Canada put too much emphasis on winning. He and the technical advisory committee of the CAHA shared the same stance against competitive hockey below age ten, and he spoke against parents that attempt to circumvent rules designed for balanced teams and fair play. He also felt that there were too many minor ice hockey organizations that were giving into parents' desires at younger age groups.

In 1973, Devine announced that the CAHA sanctioned a new national midget hockey tournament for the top 12 teams in the country, which became known as the Wrigley Cup due to Wrigley Company being the initial sponsor. The 1974 event was scheduled at the Oshawa Civic Auditorium, with the winning team to earn a trip to the Soviet Union, and future events would be rotated around Canada. He also responded to an Alberta government report about junior hockey, and said its recommendation to eliminate player contracts would defeat the purpose of the CAHA, to provide a competitive structure in hockey. If player movements were unrestricted, the balance of power would shift to teams with more money.

During the 1974 World Junior Ice Hockey Championships, Devine and Gordon Juckes were approached by Andrey Starovoytov of the Soviet Union, regarding having another Summit Series. On April 29, 1974, Devine represented the CAHA at an agreement for Team Canada to play the Soviet Team in a six-game series, and that Canada would be represented by players from the World Hockey Association (WHA). He became part of the directing committee for the 1974 Summit Series, and later extended it to eight games. Before the games in the Soviet Union, he announced that Team Canada would depart early, and play exhibition games versus Finland, Czechoslovakia, and hopefully Sweden.

The remainder of his first year as president was consumed by negotiating development and draft agreements for CAHA players, with the NHL and the WHA. In May 1973, Devine met with the NHL to review details of the current agreement up for renewal on June 30, 1973, and prevent efforts by the WHA to deal independently with the WCHL. The WHA had recently signed junior-age players Mark Howe and Marty Howe, despite two letters from the WHA to Kryczka that the WHA would not do so. The WHA felt that development fees for the CAHA were too high, and took the stance that CAHA players were already professionals since they received a weekly stipend to cover living expenses.

The existing agreement with the NHL provides education for players, and development funds for the junior teams. Devine doubted that the NHL would begin drafting players below the age of 20, despite internally discussing whether to renew the existing agreement with the CAHA, in response to the signings supported by WHA president Gary Davidson. Devine cautioned that a bidding war between the NHL and the WHA for junior players, would be detrimental to the amateur hockey system in Canada. Devine and the CAHA met with Davidson and the WHA in Toronto on September 7, 1973, along with Canadian Minister of Health and Welfare Marc Lalonde, and Sport Canada director Lou Lefaive to discuss long-term solutions.

Devine announced a tentative draft agreement with the WHA on September 8, 1973, but he did not disclose amounts, pending ratification by both bodies. Payments were expected to be retroactive, and a clause was included for exceptional underage players to be drafted. On September 17, 1973, Devine announced that the CAHA and the NHL were close to a new draft agreement, also with a clause inserted to allow drafting players 18 to 20 years old of exceptional status. On March 29, 1974, the CAHA and the WHA signed a one-year draft agreement allowing for one exceptional player per WHA team to be drafted in the first or second round only.

=== Second term ===
Devine was re-elected to a second year as CAHA president by acclamation, on May 24, 1974. The CAHA gained another branch when it approved splitting the Maritime Amateur Hockey Association into the Nova Scotia Hockey Association and the Prince Edward Island Hockey Association. At the same meeting, Devine announced that the CAHA would shift the decision making to each individual province on how to rank its leagues within the pyramid of play, but also expressed reservation that too many leagues might rank themselves at too high of a tier. Also at the 1974 general meeting, he announced that the 1975 World Junior Ice Hockey Championships would be co-hosted in Manitoba and Minnesota. It was decided later that, an all-star team from the WCHL would represent Canada.

On June 3, 1974, Devine announced that a meeting among Canada, Czechoslovakia, Finland, Sweden, and the Soviet Union, resulted in an agreement in principle to have open competition in IIHF World Championships, and be within Olympic regulations, which later became the basis for the Canada Cup. It was a welcome development, as he had previously stated it was difficult for Canada to field a competitive international team due to professional leagues controlling too many players. The announcement foreshadowed a potential World Cup of Hockey, and the possibility of Canada's return to international competition. In December that year, the CAHA proposed making its own international council independent of Hockey Canada, because Devine felt that one organization with its subcommittees was more streamlined.

In August 1974, the report Investigation and Inquiry into Violence in Amateur Hockey was made public by René Brunelle, the Ontario Minister of Social and Family Services. The report was commissioned after the Bramalea Blues withdrew from the OHA due to violence in the 1974 playoffs. In response to the report, Devine said that the recommended financial support from the government to better instruct coaches and referees would only be beneficial. The CAHA later followed up on safety recommendations, and endorsed its first brand-name helmet in January 1975.

In November 1974, Devine and the CAHA requested a follow-up meeting with the NHL, the WHA, and government officials to find long-term solutions to protect amateur hockey in Canada. Devine had been criticized by Ed Chynoweth of the WCHL, for failing to pressure the NHL and the WHA on the late payment of development money, and threatened to pull the WCHL out of the CAHA. Devine also came under fire from the new WHA president John F. Bassett in February 1975, when Bassett stated that his league will resume signing players 18 years of age and older when the one-year contract expired with the CAHA, until the legal age laws in Canada were changed. The agreement with the NHL regarding drafted players expired in May 1975, and Devine was unable to reach agreement on a renewal. He was succeeded by Don Johnson as president of the CAHA, at the annual meeting on May 22, 1975.

== Later life ==
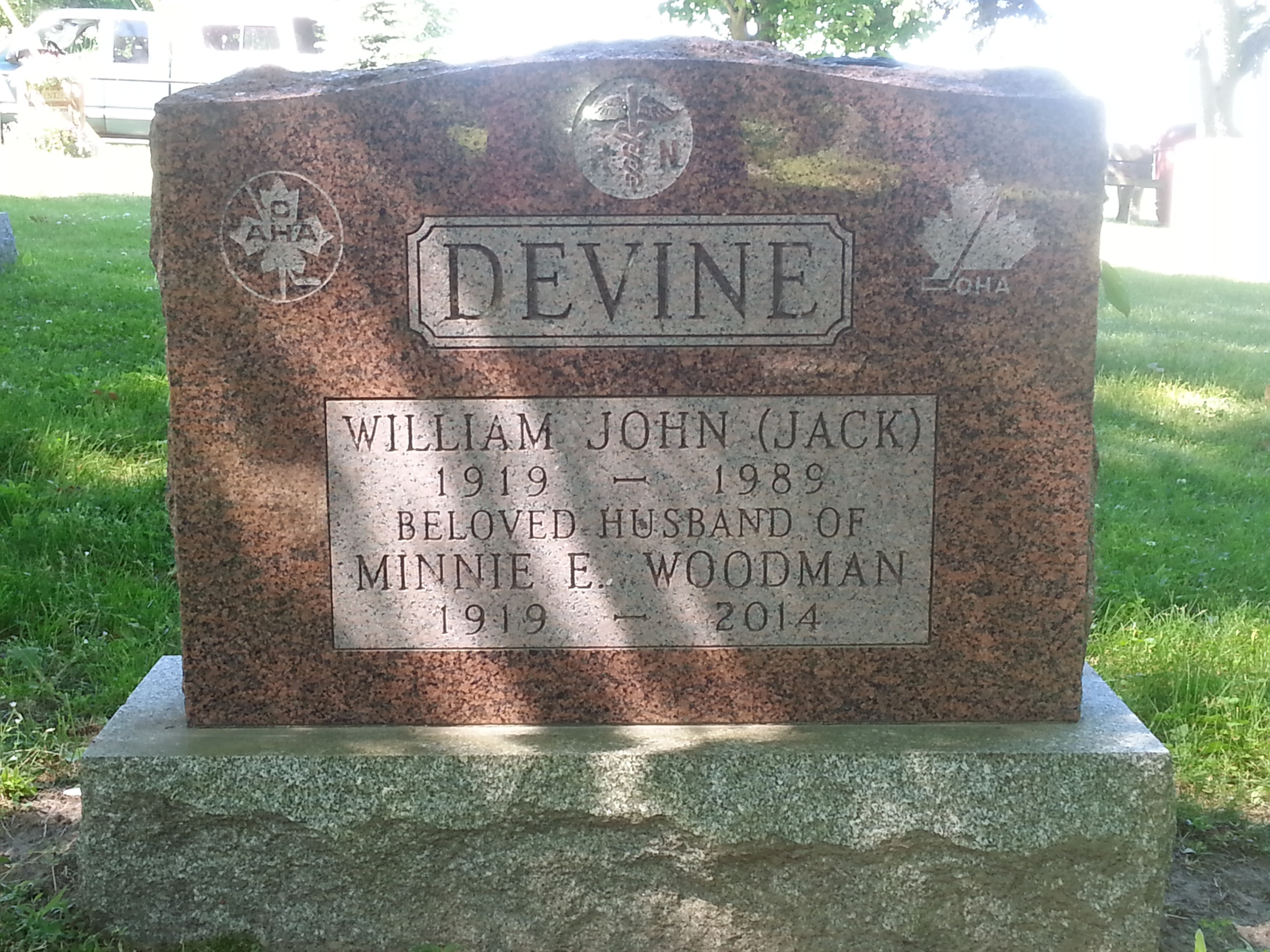
Devine's gravestone in the Wolfe Island United Church's Point Alexandria Cemetery

After leaving the presidency of the CAHA, Devine was elected to the International Ice Hockey Federation (IIHF) governing council on July 24, 1975. He served in that position with the IIHF until 1978. During his time with the IIHF, it voted to allow professionals to participate in the Ice Hockey World Championships as of 1977. Devine said there were some issues to resolve before Canada decided to return to international play, such as the time of year which usually coincided with professional ice hockey playoffs.

In a 1988 interview about his hockey career, he remarked that "when it comes to hockey, politicians get on and off bandwagons faster than anybody".

Devine died at Belleville General Hospital on April 27, 1989, at age 70. He and his wife Minnie Woodman had two sons and one daughter. He was interred in the Wolfe Island United Church's Point Alexandria Cemetery.

== Honours and awards ==
Devine received the Sports Federation of Canada broadcasting award in 1967. In 1973, he was recognized by Sport Canada for his contributions to amateur sport participation in Canada. He received the OHA Gold Stick award of merit in 1974, and was made a life member of the OHA in 1976. He received the City of Bellevlle Award in 1976. On May 23, 1979, Devine was given life membership in the CAHA.

Devine received the Canadian Boating Federation award of the decade for the 1970s. He was inducted into the Belleville Sports Hall of Fame in 1988. He was also life member of the Prince Edward Power Boat Racing Club, and an honorary life member of the Metro Toronto Hockey League.
