= Matt Leyden =

Canadian ice hockey executive (1904–1975)

- Born: 1904; Hawick, Scotland
- Died: December 23, 1975 (aged 71); Oshawa, Ontario
- Occupations: Ice hockey executive Oshawa Generals manager

Matthew Leyden (1904 – December 23, 1975) was a Scotland-born Canadian former ice hockey executive and administrator, with the Ontario Hockey Association (OHA). He managed the Oshawa Generals from 1937 to 1953, and built the team which won seven consecutive OHA championships, and three Memorial Cups. He is the namesake of both the Matt Leyden Trophy, and the Leyden Trophy.

== Career ==
Leyden was born in 1904, and was the first of three boys to parents Robert and Margaret Leyden. He immigrated with his family to Oshawa, Ontario, from Hawick, Scotland, in 1914 at age 10.

Leyden managed the Oshawa Majors from 1928 to 1937, and the Oshawa Generals from 1937 to 1953. Leyden established the Generals dynasty from 1937 to 1944, winning seven consecutive J. Ross Robertson Cups under his leadership. The Generals also won three Memorial Cups, in 1939, 1940, and 1944. As of the 2017 Memorial Cup, Leyden remains one of only three general managers to assemble three Memorial Cup winning teams; the others are Warren Rychel of the Windsor Spitfires, and Bob Brown of the Kamloops Blazers.

Leyden was also involved with men's box lacrosse. He managed the Oshawa team to the 1929 Mann Cup title, and was an active member of Oshawa Green Gaels from 1964 to 1971. Leyden served on the Canadian Amateur Hockey Association executive, while he was president of the Ontario Hockey Association (OHA) from 1965 to 1967. Leyden and CAHA president Art Potter spoke at the 1965 Memorial Cup banquet and gave similar views on the state of minor ice hockey in Canada, and noted the booming growth in participation in the game, but that boys lost interest in their late teenage years after having played organized hockey for 10 years. Leyden felt that Ontario was on the right course with the established of multiple tiers in junior ice hockey to keep the players involved. He was succeeded by Jack Devine as OHA president.

Leyden died December 23, 1975, in Oshawa. He was interred at Mount Lawn Cemetery in Whitby, Ontario. He was regarded by Hap Emms as a close friend, an honorable person, and someone who should have been enshrined in the Hockey Hall of Fame.

== Honours ==
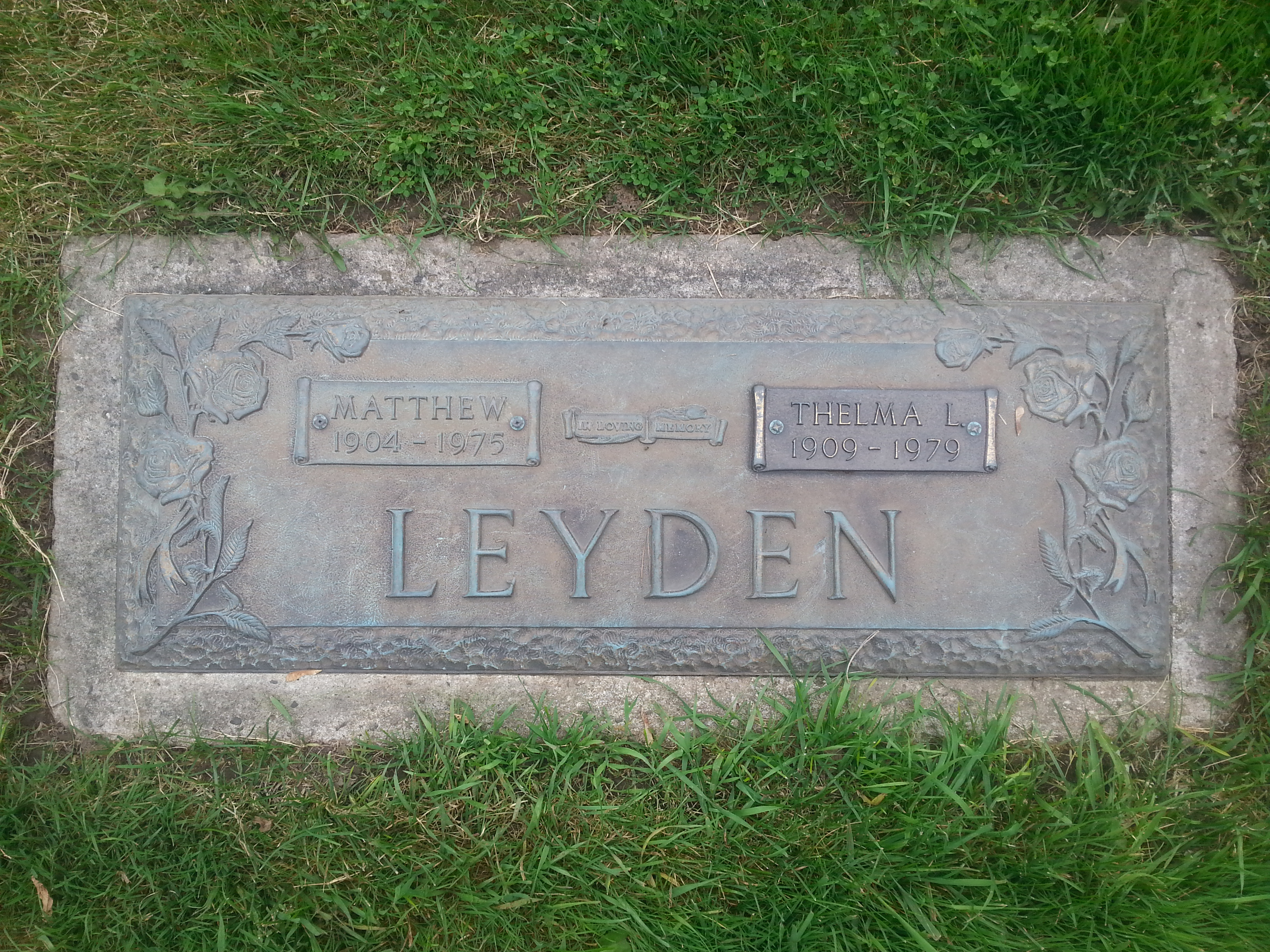
Leyden's gravestone in Mount Lawn Cemetery in Whitby, Ontario

Leyden received the Ontario Hockey Association gold stick award for dedication and service to the sport in 1956, and was made a lifetime member in 1972. The Ontario Hockey League has awarded Matt Leyden Trophy annually since 1972, for the OHL Coach of the Year. In 1973, Leyden received the CAHA Order of Merit. In 1975, the Ontario Hockey League split into east and west division, creating the Leyden division for the eastern teams. The Leyden Trophy was awarded to the winner of the Leyden division until 1994–95, when the league realigned into three divisions. It is now awarded to the regular season champion of the East division. Oshawa Minor Hockey introduced the Matt Leyden Memorial Award in 1976, as the organization's outstanding player award. Leyden was inducted into the Oshawa Sports Hall of Fame in 1986.
