= Frank Bathgate =

Canadian ice hockey player

- Born: February 14, 1930 Winnipeg, Manitoba, Canada
- Died: February 21, 2015 (aged 85) Brampton, Ontario, Canada
- Height: 5 ft 10 in (178 cm)
- Weight: 162 lb (73 kg; 11 st 8 lb)
- Position: Centre
- Shot: Right
- Played for: New York Rangers
- Playing career: 1950–1962

Frank Douglas Bathgate (February 14, 1930 – February 21, 2015) was a Canadian ice hockey centre. He played two games in the National Hockey League with the New York Rangers during the 1952–53 season. The rest of his career, which lasted from 1950 to 1962, was spent in the minor leagues.

His brother was the Hockey Hall of Famer Andy Bathgate. He died in 2015.

== Career statistics ==
=== Regular season and playoffs ===
			Regular season					Playoffs
Season	Team	League	GP	G	A	Pts	PIM	GP	G	A	Pts	PIM
1947–48	Guelph Biltmores	OHA	29	4	5	9	6	—	—	—	—	—
1948–49	Guelph Biltmores	OHA	45	16	22	38	34	—	—	—	—	—
1949–50	Guelph Biltmores	OHA	42	15	30	45	77	15	7	10	17	10
1949–50	Guelph Biltmores	M-Cup	—	—	—	—	—	11	3	7	10	11
1950–51	Charlottetown Islanders	MMHL	79	35	58	93	51	—	—	—	—	—
1951–52	Vancouver Canucks	PCHL	13	0	3	3	2	—	—	—	—	—
1951–52	Sydney Millionaires	MMHL	79	35	58	93	51	—	—	—	—	—
1952–53	New York Rangers	NHL	2	0	0	0	2	—	—	—	—	—
1952–53	Shawinigan Falls Cataractes	QSHL	54	22	31	55	10	—	—	—	—	—
1953–54	Vancouver Canucks	WHL	5	0	3	3	7	—	—	—	—	—
1953–54	Windsor Bulldogs	OHA Sr	42	20	39	59	81	3	0	1	1	4
1954–55	Windsor Bulldogs	OHA Sr	45	18	31	49	76	12	6	2	8	16
1955–56	Windsor Bulldogs	OHA Sr	48	23	30	53	82	—	—	—	—	—
1956–57	Windsor Bulldogs	OHA Sr	52	16	37	53	67	12	6	6	12	31
1957–58	Windsor Bulldogs	OHA Sr	59	33	37	70	99	13	3	11	14	20
1958–59	Windsor Bulldogs	OHA Sr	21	4	10	14	10	—	—	—	—	—
1958–59	Belleville McFarlands	OHA Sr	18	7	7	14	2	—	—	—	—	—
1958–59	Toledo Mercurys	IHL	25	9	18	27	34	—	—	—	—	—
1959–60	Chatham Maroons	OHA Sr	51	13	25	38	12	19	7	12	19	20
1959–60	Chatham Maroons	Al-Cup	—	—	—	—	—	13	6	21	27	33
1960–61	Chatham Maroons	OHA Sr	15	6	11	17	4	—	—	—	—	—
1961–62	Waterloo Tigers	OHA Sr	11	3	10	13	10	—	—	—	—	—
OHA Sr totals			362	143	237	380	443	59	22	32	54	91
NHL totals			2	0	0	0	2	—	—	—	—	—
