= CIGL-FM =

Radio station in Belleville, Ontario

Coordinates: 44°11′15″N 77°25′27″W

- Belleville, Ontario; Canada
- Broadcast area: Belleville-Quinte West
- Frequency: 97.1 MHz
- Branding: Mix 97

Programming
- Format: Hot adult contemporary
- Affiliations: Compass Media Networks; Premiere Networks

Ownership
- Owner: Quinte Broadcasting
- Sister stations: CJBQ, CJTN-FM

History
- First air date: August 1962
- Former call signs: CJBQ-FM (1962–1978)

Technical information
- Licensing authority: CRTC
- Class: B
- ERP: 18,000 watts
- HAAT: 121 metres (397 ft)

Links
- Website: mix97.com

CIGL-FM is a Canadian radio station, broadcasting on the assigned frequency of 97.1 MHz in Belleville, Ontario, with the on-air branding of Mix 97. It airs a hot adult contemporary format.

== History ==
The station first started in 1962 as CJBQ-FM, then changed its callsign to CIGL-FM in 1978. The former CJBQ callsign currently belongs to its sister station CJBQ. The call letters CIGL were often featured with seagulls in logos and advertisements, leading many to conclude that the call letters were a short form for "seagull".

Until 1995 CIGL featured essentially a "Beautiful Music" format playing many instrumental renditions of popular songs by artists such as Percy Faith, Nelson Riddle, Richard Clayderman, Frank Mills and Floyd Cramer. As the popularity of the Beautiful Music format decreased throughout the 1980s all around North America, more soft rock vocal music was added, including light songs by Kenny Rogers, Glenn Medieros and many others. On July 1, 1995, the station was re-branded as Mix 97, and adopted its current format.

CIGL is owned by Quinte Broadcasting.

On July 14, 2021, Quinte Broadcasting received CRTC approval to decrease the radiated power from 50,000 to 18,000 watts, increasing the effective antenna height above average terrain from 48.5 to 121 metres, and amending the existing coordinates of the transmitter site.
