= Gerry Leonard (ice hockey) =

Canadian ice hockey player

- Born: March 30, 1936 (age 88); Edmonton, Alberta, Canada
- Height: 5 ft 11 in (180 cm)
- Weight: 165 lb (75 kg; 11 st 11 lb)
- Position: Center
- Shot: Left
- Played for: Seattle Totems
- Playing career: 1954–1970

Gerard Leonard (born March 30, 1936) is a Canadian retired professional hockey center who played 910 games in the Western Hockey League with the Edmonton Flyers and Seattle Totems from 1956 to 1970.
