= Windsor Bulldogs =

- City: Windsor, Ontario
- League: OHA Senior "A" 1953–1963; IHL 1963–1964
- Operated: 1953–1964
- Home arena: Windsor Arena
- Head coach: Jimmy Peters; Erwin Chamberlain; Jean Lamirande; Harry Watson

The Windsor Bulldogs are a defunct semi-professional and amateur senior ice hockey team. The team played in the City of Windsor, Ontario, Canada and participated in the International Hockey League and the OHA Senior A Hockey League prior to the IHL.

== History ==
The creation of the Windsor Bulldogs in 1953 coincided with the folding of the Ontario Hockey Association's Junior "A" Windsor Spitfires. Although no Spitfires made the direct jump to the Bulldogs, eventually five members of the team did eventually play for the Bulldogs.

In 1955, the Windsor Bulldogs made it to the OHA Senior league's final, but were put down by the Kitchener-Waterloo Dutchmen in five games. The Bulldogs were showing their worth by only their second season.

The 1959–60 season saw the Bulldogs make the final again. Windsor ran into their local rivals, the Chatham Maroons and were defeated in six games. The Maroons went on to win the Allan Cup as Canadian National Senior A Champions.

The next season, the Bulldogs made it back to the finals to fall to a different opponent. The other finalist was the Galt Terriers and Galt took no prisoners sweeping the series in four games. Again, their opponents went on to win the Allan Cup.

The 1961–62 season was a different story. In the final, the Bulldogs drew the Chatham Maroons. The series went the distance, but the Bulldogs pulled out game seven and won the series in seven games to win their first J. Ross Robertson Cup as league champions. In the Allan Cup Eastern final, the Bulldogs could not make it past the Montreal Olympics.

In 1962–63, the Windsor Bulldogs repeated as Robertson Cup champions as they swept the Chatham Maroons in four games. Everything went right for the Bulldogs and they found themselves in the Allan Cup Finals against the Winnipeg Maroons. In a low scoring series, the Bulldogs defeated the Maroons in five games to clinch their first and only Allan Cup as National Champions.

Riding the wave of success, the Allan Cup champions committed to join the International Hockey League along with the Chatham Maroons for the 1963–64 season. After a mediocre losing season, the Bulldogs ceased operations.

== Season-by-season results ==
Season	GP	W	L	T	GF	GA	P	Results	Playoffs
1953–54	56	29	26	1	241	214	59	3rd OHA Sr. A	
1954–55	50	27	19	4	221	183	58	2nd OHA Sr. A	Lost Final
1955–56	48	21	25	2	187	198	44	5th OHA Sr. A	
1956–57	52	32	17	3	214	152	67	2nd OHA Sr. A	
1957–58	60	25	33	2	211	229	52	8th OHA Sr. A	
1958–59	54	20	32	2	219	241	42	9th OHA Sr. A	
1959–60	54	29	22	3	241	158	63	2nd OHA Sr. A	Lost Final
1960–61	40	24	14	2	199	143	50	1st OHA Sr. A	Lost Final
1961–62	34	23	10	1	180	117	47	2nd OHA Sr. A	Won League
1962–63	40	27	12	1	299	161	55	1st OHA Sr. A	Won League, Won Allan Cup
1963–64	70	32	35	3	226	280	67	4th IHL	

== Notable players ==
- Reg Abbott
- Frank Bathgate
- Marv Edwards
- Don Head
- Lionel Heinrich
- Floyd Hillman
- Derek Holmes
- Dick Kotanen
- Ed Kullman
- Jean Lamirande
- Bill Mitchell
- Clare Raglan
- Wayne Rutledge
- Don Ward
- Bob White
