= Clare Raglan =

Canadian ice hockey player

- Born: September 4, 1927 Pembroke, Ontario, Canada
- Died: April 15, 2002 (aged 74) Peterborough, Ontario, Canada
- Height: 6 ft 1 in (185 cm)
- Weight: 177 lb (80 kg; 12 st 9 lb)
- Position: Defence
- Shot: Left
- Played for: Detroit Red Wings; Chicago Black Hawks
- Playing career: 1944–1961

Clarence Eldon "Rags" Raglan (September 4, 1927 – April 15, 2002) was a Canadian professional ice hockey defenceman who played 100 games in the National Hockey League with the Detroit Red Wings and Chicago Black Hawks between 1950 and 1953. The rest of his career, which lasted from 1944 to 1961, was spent in various minor leagues. Raglan was born in Pembroke, Ontario, and his son, Herb Raglan, also played in the NHL.

== Career statistics ==
=== Regular season and playoffs ===
			Regular season					Playoffs
Season	Team	League	GP	G	A	Pts	PIM	GP	G	A	Pts	PIM
1944–45	Toronto Marlboros	OHA	6	0	1	1	16	—	—	—	—	—
1944–45	Toronto Uptown Tire	TMHL	5	0	0	0	4	—	—	—	—	—
1945–46	Toronto Marlboros	OHA	25	2	10	12	41	4	0	2	2	6
1945–46	Toronto Dorsts	TMHL	1	0	0	0	0	—	—	—	—	—
1945–46	Toronto People's Credit	TIHL	3	0	1	1	0	—	—	—	—	—
1946–47	Toronto Marlboros	OHA	20	5	4	9	50	2	0	2	2	0
1946–47	Toronto Dorsts	TMHL	2	0	2	2	0	11	9	8	17	26
1947–48	Quebec Aces	QSHL	45	9	11	20	106	10	0	1	1	16
1948–49	Quebec Aces	QSHL	63	11	24	35	121	3	0	2	2	4
1949–50	Indianapolis Capitals	AHL	68	4	17	21	61	8	0	2	2	11
1950–51	Indianapolis Capitals	AHL	30	2	10	12	35	3	0	1	1	4
1950–51	Detroit Red Wings	NHL	33	1	4	5	14	—	—	—	—	—
1951–52	St. Louis Flyers	AHL	30	2	12	14	42	—	—	—	—	—
1951–52	Chicago Black Hawks	NHL	35	0	5	5	28	—	—	—	—	—
1952–53	Edmonton Flyers	WHL	18	3	2	5	38	—	—	—	—	—
1952–53	Chicago Black Hawks	NHL	32	1	3	4	10	3	0	0	0	0
1953–54	Quebec Aces	QSHL	63	10	12	22	86	14	0	1	1	4
1954–55	Buffalo Bisons	AHL	57	5	8	13	92	10	0	4	4	14
1955–56	Buffalo Bisons	AHL	43	2	18	20	48	3	0	1	1	6
1956–57	Vancouver Canucks	WHL	18	2	3	5	16	—	—	—	—	—
1957–58	Vancouver Canucks	WHL	50	4	13	17	50	—	—	—	—	—
1958–59	Belleville McFarlands	OHA Sr	22	0	9	9	26	—	—	—	—	—
1958–59	Kingston CKLCs	EOHL	30	4	24	28	44	12	0	5	5	6
1959–60	Washington Presidents	EHL	49	3	12	15	41	—	—	—	—	—
1960–61	Windsor Bulldogs	OHA Sr	8	1	4	5	20	—	—	—	—	—
AHL totals			228	15	65	80	278	24	0	8	8	35
NHL totals			100	4	9	13	52	3	0	0	0	0
