= Joe Bell (ice hockey) =

Canadian ice hockey player

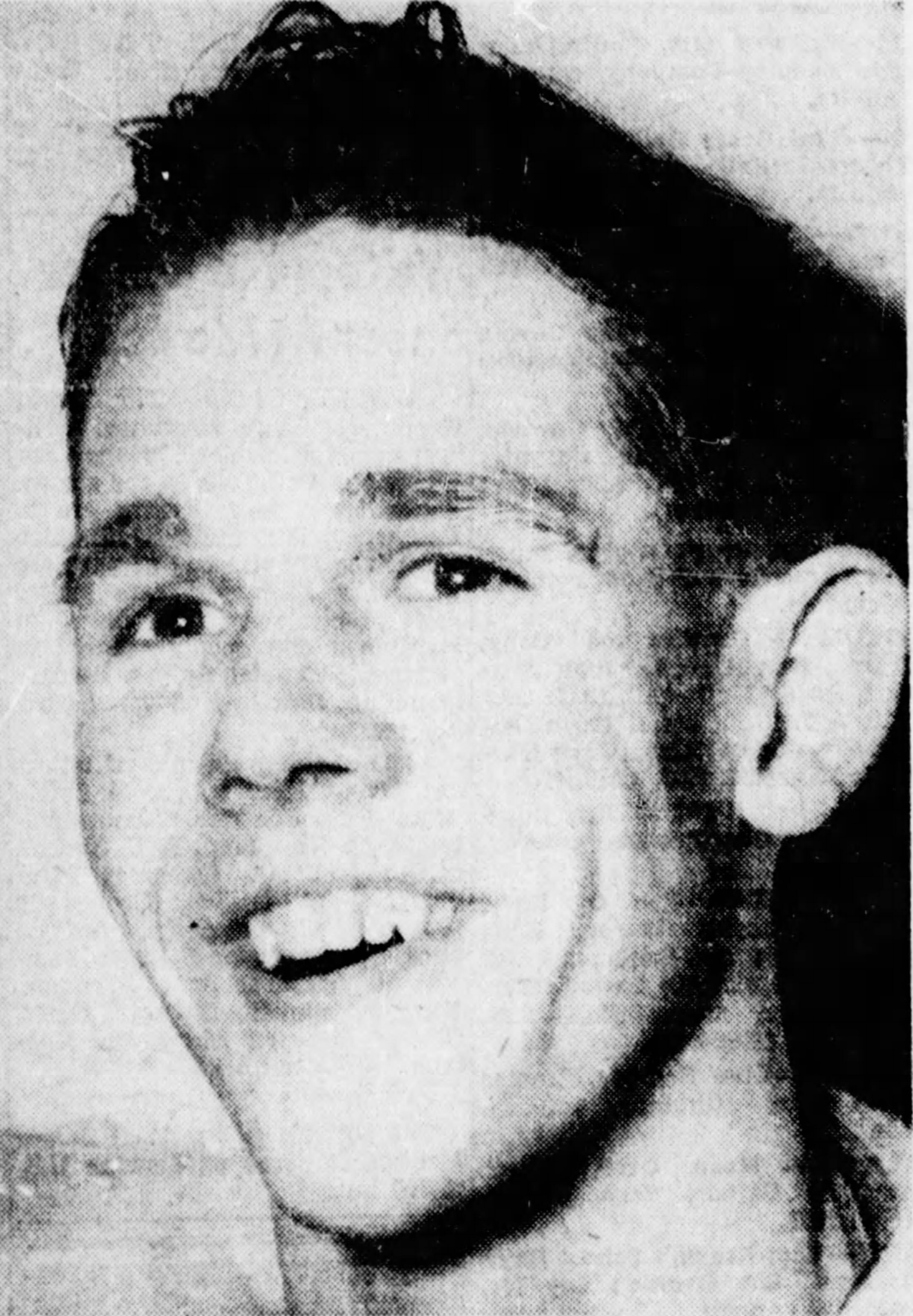
- Bell pictured in 1942
- Born: November 27, 1923; Portage la Prairie, Manitoba, Canada
- Died: February 17, 2014 (aged 90); Seattle, Washington, U.S.
- Height: 5 ft 10 in (178 cm)
- Weight: 170 lb (77 kg; 12 st 2 lb)
- Position: Left wing
- Shot: Left
- Played for: New York Rangers
- Playing career: 1942–1956

Joseph Alexander Bell (November 27, 1923 – February 17, 2014) was a Canadian professional ice hockey player who played 62 games in the National Hockey League with the New York Rangers during the 1942–43 and 1946–47 seasons. The rest of his career, which lasted from 1942 to 1956, was spent in the minor leagues. He was born in Portage la Prairie, Manitoba. His brother Gordie Bell also played in the NHL. Bell died in February 2014, at the age of 90.

== Career statistics ==
=== Regular season and playoffs ===
			Regular season					Playoffs
Season	Team	League	GP	G	A	Pts	PIM	GP	G	A	Pts	PIM
1939–40	Portage Terriers	MJHL	1	0	1	1	0	—	—	—	—	—
1940–41	Portage Terriers	MJHL	16	17	13	30	14	5	5	2	7	12
1941–42	Portage Terriers	MJHL	18	36	19	55	21	12	31	16	47	6
1942–43	New York Rangers	NHL	15	2	5	7	6	—	—	—	—	—
1942–43	Winnipeg HCMS Chippewas	WNDHL	9	4	5	9	2	4	2	2	4	8
1943–44	Winnipeg HCMS Chippewas	WNDHL	10	17	6	23	14	—	—	—	—	—
1943–44	Cornwallis Navy	NSDHL	1	5	2	7	—	11	12	15	27	29
1945–46	New Haven Eagles	AHL	45	33	17	50	16	—	—	—	—	—
1945–46	Hershey Bears	AHL	17	13	14	27	20	3	1	1	2	4
1946–47	New York Rangers	NHL	47	6	4	10	12	—	—	—	—	—
1946–47	New Haven Ramblers	AHL	13	10	4	14	10	—	—	—	—	—
1947–48	Buffalo Bisons	AHL	66	30	27	57	64	8	4	0	4	4
1948–49	Buffalo Bisons	AHL	3	0	0	0	0	—	—	—	—	—
1948–49	Dallas Texans	USHL	55	37	38	75	40	4	4	1	5	2
1949–50	Cincinnati Mohawks	AHL	7	1	2	3	0	—	—	—	—	—
1949–50	Louisville Blades	USHL	53	31	25	56	8	—	—	—	—	—
1950–51	Seattle Ironmen	PCHL	63	46	32	78	32	—	—	—	—	—
1951–52	Seattle Ironmen	PCHL	66	38	31	69	24	4	0	3	3	0
1952–53	Seattle Bombers	WHL	59	25	28	53	20	5	1	3	4	2
1953–54	Seattle Bombers	WHL	70	24	23	47	22	—	—	—	—	—
1954–55	Nelson Maple Leafs	WIHL	38	29	49	78	58	9	5	3	8	24
1955–56	Nelson Maple Leafs	WIHL	42	19	31	50	42	5	1	1	2	14
AHL totals			151	87	64	151	110	11	5	1	6	8
NHL totals			62	8	9	17	18	—	—	—	—	—

== Awards and achievements ==
- MJHL Goal Scoring Leader (1942)
- Turnbull Cup (MJHL) Championship (1942)
- Memorial Cup Championship (1942)
- AHL First All-Star Team (1946)
- AHL Goal Scoring Leader (1946)
- USHL Second All-Star Team (1949)
- PCHL First All-Star Team (1951)
- PCHL Goal Scoring Leader (1951)
- WIHL Scoring Champion (1955)
- Honoured Member of the Manitoba Hockey Hall of Fame
