= Kelowna Packers =

The Kelowna Packers were a senior ice hockey team from Kelowna, British Columbia. The team existed from 1949 to 1960, and played as members of the Okanagan Senior Hockey League from 1951 onward. They were runners-up in the 1958 Allan Cup finals, and were the first ice hockey team from Canada to play an exhibition tour in the Soviet Union.

== History ==
The Kelowna Packers were established in 1949 in Kelowna, British Columbia. The Packers finished first place in the Okanagan Senior Hockey League (OSHL) during the 1957–58 season. In that year's playoffs, the Packers defeated the Kamloops Chiefs in a best-of-seven series to win the OSHL championship. In the Western Canada playoffs, the Packers defeated the Winnipeg Maroons to win the T. B. Patton Cup. The Packers qualified for the 1958 Allan Cup finals against the Eastern Canada champion Belleville McFarlands, but lost in seven games.

In May 1958, the Canadian Amateur Hockey Association approved sending its first Canadian team on an exhibition tour of the Soviet Union. The Kelowna Packers were chosen as the Allan Cup finalists. CAHA secretary-manager George Dudley arranged a five-game tour in the Soviet Union, and for three subsequent games in Sweden. Dudley hoped that the Kelowna tour would promote future cultural exchanges with Eastern Europe.

Outside Kelowna, there were critics of this decision and some predicted that the Packers would return without so much as a single win. The Packers lost their first game against the Russian Army team 4–3. They tied the next two games 1–1 against Krylya Sovetov Moscow and 2–2 against Dynamo Moscow. In the fourth game, against the Soviet Juniors, the Packers won 4–3. In the final match, they faced the Moscow Selects, and won 5–1. During the Packers' exhibition tour of Sweden, they won two of three games played versus the Sweden men's national ice hockey team. Each game finished in a 5–2 score.

In the 1959–60 season, the Packers again captured the OSHL title. The team folded after the season.

== Legacy ==
A junior ice hockey team of the same name that played in the British Columbia Hockey League from 1986 to 1989. This junior team was renamed the Kelowna Spartans in 1989.
