= CJBQ =

Radio station in Belleville, Ontario

Coordinates: 43°58′10″N 77°25′13″W

- Belleville, Ontario; Canada
- Broadcast area: Quinte West
- Frequency: 800 kHz
- Branding: CJBQ 800 AM

Programming
- Format: Full-service (country/oldies/adult contemporary)

Ownership
- Owner: Quinte Broadcasting
- Sister stations: CIGL-FM, CJTN-FM

History
- First air date: 1946
- Former frequencies: 1230 kHz (1946–1957)
- Call sign meaning: Belleville Quinte

Technical information
- Licensing authority: CRTC
- Class: B
- Power: 10 kW

Links
- Website: cjbq.com

CJBQ is a Canadian radio station licensed at Belleville, Ontario. It is owned by Quinte Broadcasting along with CIGL-FM and CJTN-FM. CJBQ broadcasts on 800 kHz at a power of 10 kW. The transmitter is located in Prince Edward County. The antenna is a six-tower array with differing patterns day and night, to protect Class-A clear-channel station XEROK-AM in Ciudad Juárez, Mexico, as well as other Canadian and U.S. stations on the same frequency. Since the late 2000s, CJBQ is the only remaining Canadian AM radio station operating between Ottawa and the Greater Toronto Area.

CJBQ's format includes country, oldies and adult contemporary. It is mostly locally programmed, with the exception of John Tesh's syndicated program that airs during evenings. CJBQ also carries live broadcasts of Belleville Senators hockey games.

== History ==
The station launched in 1946 on AM 1230, and moved to its current frequency in 1957. An FM sister station, CJBQ-FM, was launched in 1962. Semi-satellites in Bancroft (CJNH) and Trenton (CJTN) were added in 1975 and 1979 respectively; the Bancroft station was sold in 2000.

In the summer of 1970 a budding young Peter Mansbridge, then at CBC Radio affiliate CHFC in Churchill, Manitoba, answered a trade publication ad for a "Broadcast position available at CJBQ in Belleville, Ontario", only to have the station turn him down flat. He landed at CBC owned-and-operated station CBW 990 in Winnipeg in 1971, crossing to television a year later and eventually taking the national news anchor desk.

CJBQ, CJTN and CJNH were private affiliates of CBC Radio. They lost this affiliation in 1984 when CBC added CBCP-FM, a Peterborough-based rebroadcaster of CBL Toronto. The station subsequently adopted an adult contemporary ("hits of the present and past") format, which it retained until switching to a full time country format in 1993. Today the station's music format is predominantly gold-based AC spanning the 1960s through the 2010s, with some classic country and oldies mixed in, in addition to a continued heavy local news, talk and sports commitment; sister station CIGL-FM programs a more contemporary AC format.

During the years when it was a CBC affiliate, CJBQ dayparted its music programming between Top 40 and country. It gained national prominence in the 1960s for its strident support of Canadian artists, programming as much as 40% Canadian content in the era before it was mandated by the government. This practice led the Canadian music trade paper RPM to dub Belleville "the capital of Canadian music" in 1966.

In 2021, CJBQ celebrated its 75th anniversary on the air.

== Notable employees ==
- Jack Devine
- Jack Miller
