= Seattle Totems =

Professional ice hockey team

- City: Seattle, Washington
- League: NIHL (1943–44); PCHL (1944–1952); WHL (1952–1974); CHL (1974–75)
- Founded: 1943
- Operated: 1943–1975
- Home arena: Civic Ice Arena; Seattle Center Coliseum
- Colors: 1943–1952: Red, blue, white 1952–1954: Green, black 1955–1965: Blue, white, red 1965–1975: Kelly green, white

Franchise history
- 1943–44: Seattle Isacsson Iron Workers (NIHL)
- 1944–1952: Seattle Ironmen (PCHL)
- 1952–1954: Seattle Bombers (WHL)
- 1955–1958: Seattle Americans (WHL)
- 1958–1974: Seattle Totems (WHL)
- 1974–75: Seattle Totems (CHL)

Championships
- Playoff championships: 3 (1959, 1967, 1968)

The Seattle Totems were a professional ice hockey franchise in Seattle, Washington. Under several names prior to 1958, the franchise was a member of the Pacific Coast Hockey League (renamed the Western Hockey League in 1952) between 1944 and 1974. In their last season of existence, the Totems played in the Central Hockey League in the 1974–75 season. They played their home games in the Civic Ice Arena and later at the Seattle Center Coliseum. The Totems won three WHL Lester Patrick Cup championships in 1959, 1967 and 1968.

The Totems were one of the few American-based professional clubs to play a touring Soviet team. On December 25, 1972, the Totems lost to the Soviets 9–4. A rematch between the two teams was held on January 4, 1974, where, led by Don Westbrooke's three goals, the Totems won 8–4.

== Franchise history ==
=== Seattle Ironmen (1944–1952) ===
1951–52 logo for the Seattle Ironmen, whose uniform inspired the 2022 Seattle Kraken alternate uniform

After World War II, the Pacific Coast Hockey League (PCHL), a major professional league on the West Coast in the 1910s and 1920s, was resurrected as a semi-professional loop. Seattle, as a notably strong hockey town and the first city outside of Canada to host a Stanley Cup champion (the 1917 Seattle Metropolitans), was granted two franchises, one of which were the Seattle Ironmen.

The club had been founded as an amateur team the previous year in the Northwest Industrial Hockey League, where they were known as the Seattle Isaacson Iron Workers. As NIHL teams were operated by war industry companies, most players for the Iron Workers additionally worked at the production lines of the U.S. Navy's Isaacson Steel plant in nearby Tukwila, Washington.

When the club entered the new PCHL in its inaugural 1944–45 season, it was renamed the Seattle Ironmen and hired Frank Dotten as its new head coach. The club had modest success, finishing in first place in the 1947–48 regular season. When the league itself became fully professional for the 1948–49 season, only four of the previous season's players remained, leaving the roster to be replaced by amateur players from Tacoma and the team to finish last in its division.

Over its existence, the Ironmen's most notable stars were Gordon Kerr, the team's leading scorer in those years with 235 points in 244 games, William Robinson, Eddie Dartnell and Joe Bell. Among other notables for the team were future NHL star goaltender Al Rollins and legendary Philadelphia Flyers coach Fred Shero.

The Ironmen served as inspiration for the 2022 Reverse Retro alternate uniform for the NHL's Seattle Kraken.

=== Seattle Bombers (1952–1954) ===
In 1952, the league changed its name to the Western Hockey League (WHL), and the Ironmen themselves changed their name to the Seattle Bombers the following season. The team continued to play poorly for two seasons, and the only bright spot was the debut for Seattle of the greatest minor league scorer of all time, Guyle Fielder. After two seasons of increasing travel costs—for which the Bombers received aid from the league—Seattle suspended operations for the 1955 season.

=== Seattle Americans (1955–1958) ===
The team rejoined the WHL as the Seattle Americans the following season, finishing in first place in 1957 led by a tremendous season by Fielder, who broke the professional single season scoring record with 122 points en route to Most Valuable Player honors and the first of four straight scoring championships for Seattle. Among other notables for the Americans were Val Fonteyne, notable as the least penalized player of all time, future Vezina winner Charlie Hodge, and future National Hockey League general managers Emile Francis and Keith Allen. The team's final season as the Americans, in 1958, saw the first time the franchise would win a playoff series.

=== Seattle Totems (1958–1975) ===
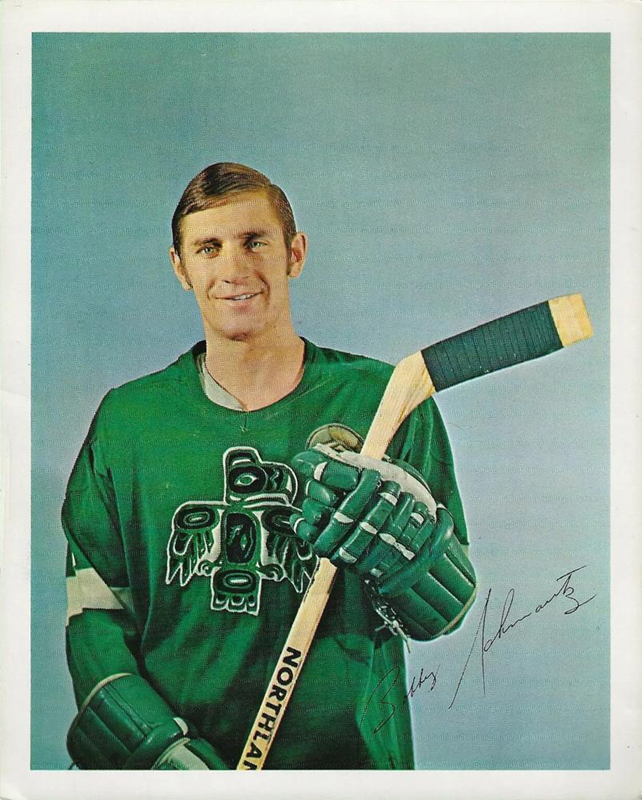
1969-70 photo of Bobby Schmautz for the Totems

The Americans were renamed the Seattle Totems for the 1958–59 season, the name by which it would go for the rest of its existence. Fielder and Filion remained the team's great stars, but like many other WHL teams the Totems had very stable rosters, and players such as Marc Boileau, Gerry Leonard, Bill MacFarland, Jim Powers, Gordie Sinclair and future NHL coach and general manager Tom McVie spent many seasons each in Seattle colors. Allen was the team's coach its first seven seasons as the Totems, guiding the team to a first-place finish in 1959 and to the playoffs six out of the seven years of his tenure. The Totems played the 1974–75 season in the Central Hockey League after the WHL folded.

== Terminated NHL expansion franchise ==
On June 12, 1974, the National Hockey League (NHL) announced that a Seattle group headed by Vince Abbey had been awarded an expansion team to begin play in the 1976–77 season. A $180,000 deposit was due by the end of 1975 and the total franchise fee was $6 million. Additionally, Abbey had to repurchase the shares in the Totems held by the Vancouver Canucks, who were using the minor-league Totems as a farm club. The expansion announcement also included a franchise for Denver, and with the loss of two more of its major markets, the WHL announced on the same day that it was folding. The Totems joined the Central Hockey League for 1974–75. The Totems folded following the 1974–75 CHL season after acquiring $2 million in debt, leaving the city without hockey for the first time in two decades; the Seattle Breakers (now the Thunderbirds) would begin play in 1977 in the junior Western Canada Hockey League.

After missing a number of deadlines while scrambling to secure financing, the NHL threatened to pull the franchise as there were a number of other suitors in the wings. A deadline was set on February 19, 1975 for Seattle to show they had the money necessary for a franchise and that the deadline not being made would either mean having to go for an extension for expansion in 1976. When the day came, Seattle was given an extension to come up with $1 million letter of credit to actually confirm plans, which could've also just featured Seattle purchasing the California Golden Seals or Pittsburgh Penguins; the deadline passed with no money paid. Another supposed final deadline was set on May 15 for Abbey to post a letter of credit that also came and went. Rumblings of spending money to be involved with the World Hockey Association went nowhere. By July, Abbey was planning to be a prospective buyer for the impending sale of the Penguins, which had gone into receivership, but the Penguins were sold elsewhere. The Seals were bought by Melvin Swig, who got permission by the San Francisco Redevelopment Agency to build a hockey rink in the Bay Area (as it turned out, the Seals moved to Cleveland the following year). The NHL pulled the expansion franchise from Seattle following this. Abbey filed suit against the NHL and the Canucks for anti-trust violations that he alleged prevented him from acquiring a team and being used as a tool for others to buy the Seals and Penguins; the lawsuit was finally settled in favor of the NHL in 1986. In 2018, the NHL again awarded Seattle an NHL team, the Seattle Kraken, which began play in 2021.

== Season-by-season results (1943–1975) ==
- 1943–44 – Northwest International Hockey League
- 1944–1952 – Pacific Coast Hockey League
- 1952–1974 – Western Hockey League
- 1974–75 – Central Hockey League

Note: GP = Games played, W = Wins, L = Losses, T = Ties, Pts = Points, GF = Goals for, GA = Goals against, PIM = Penalties in minutes

Season	Team name	GP	W	L	T	Pts	GF	GA	PIM	Finish	Playoffs
1943-44	Seattle Isacsson Iron Workers	16	9	7	0	18	103	87	0	Second in League	Lost semi-final to Portland Oilers
1944–45	Seattle Ironmen	27	20	6	1	43	161	84	0	First in North	N/A
1945–46	Seattle Ironmen	58	29	29	0	58	251	214	0	Third in North	Lost quarter-final to Portland Eagles, 1–2
1946–47	Seattle Ironmen	60	34	25	1	69	263	195	0	Second in North	Won quarter-final over New Westminster Royals, 3–1; Lost semi-final to Portland Eagles, 2–4
1947–48	Seattle Ironmen	66	42	21	3	87	311	239	1200	First in North	Won quarter-final over New Westminster Royals, 3–2; Lost semi-final to Vancouver Canucks, 1–3
1948–49	Seattle Ironmen	70	29	36	5	63	225	246	756	Fifth in North	Out of playoffs
1949–50	Seattle Ironmen	70	32	27	11	75	212	237	583	Fourth in North	Lost quarter-final to New Westminster Royals, 1–3
1950–51	Seattle Ironmen	70	23	36	11	57	214	249	525	Fifth in League	Out of playoffs
1951–52	Seattle Ironmen	70	30	31	9	69	252	280	571	Fifth in League	Lost quarter-final to Tacoma Rockets, 1–3
1952–53	Seattle Bombers	70	30	32	8	68	222	225	510	Fifth in League	Lost quarter-final to Vancouver Canucks, 2–3
1953–54	Seattle Bombers	70	22	41	7	51	209	248	536	Seventh in League	Out of playoffs
1954–55	N/A										
1955–56	Seattle Americans	70	31	37	2	64	201	243	1046	Fourth in Coast	Out of playoffs
1956–57	Seattle Americans	70	36	28	6	78	263	225	734	First in Coast	First round bye Lost quarter-final to New Westminster Royals, 2–4
1957–58	Seattle Americans	70	32	32	6	70	244	231	739	Third in Coast	Won quarter-final over New Westminster Royals, 3–1; Lost semi-final to Calgary Stampeders, 2–3
1958–59	Seattle Totems	70	40	27	3	83	277	225	798	First in Coast	Won quarter-final over Victoria Cougars, 3–0; Won semi-final over Vancouver Canucks, 4–1; Won final over Calgary Stampeders, 4–0
1959–60	Seattle Totems	70	38	28	4	80	270	219	676	Second in League	Lost semi-final to Victoria Cougars, 0–4
1960–61	Seattle Totems	70	37	28	5	79	262	222	746	Fourth in League	Won quarter-final over Calgary Stampeders, 4–1; Semi-final bye, Lost final to Portland Buckaroos, 2–4
1961–62	Seattle Totems	70	36	29	5	77	244	222	740	Second in Northern	Lost quarter-final to Calgary Stampeders, 0–2
1962–63	Seattle Totems	70	35	33	2	72	239	237	621	Second in Northern	Won quarter-final over Edmonton Flyers, 2–1; Won semi-final over Vancouver Canucks, 4-3; Lost final to San Francisco Seals, 3–4
1963–64	Seattle Totems	70	29	35	6	64	247	228	757	Fifth in League	Out of playoffs
1964–65	Seattle Totems	70	36	30	4	76	204	198	890	Second in League	Lost semi-final to Victoria Maple Leafs, 3–4
1965–66	Seattle Totems	72	32	37	3	67	231	256	751	Fifth in League	Out of playoffs
1966–67	Seattle Totems	72	39	26	7	85	228	195	923	Second in League	Won semi-final over California Seals, 4–2; Won final over Vancouver Canucks, 4–0
1967–68	Seattle Totems	72	35	30	7	77	207	199	948	Second in League	Won semi-final over Phoenix Roadrunners, 4–0; Won final over Portland Buckaroos, 4–1
1968–69	Seattle Totems	74	33	30	11	77	236	238	723	Fourth in League	Lost semi-final to Vancouver Canucks, 0–4
1969–70	Seattle Totems	73	30	35	8	68	240	260	746	Fourth in League	Lost semi-final to Portland Buckaroos, 2–4
1970–71	Seattle Totems	72	27	36	9	63	223	260	946	Fifth in League	Out of playoffs
1971–72	Seattle Totems	72	12	53	7	31	175	331	957	Sixth in League	Out of playoffs
1972–73	Seattle Totems	72	26	32	14	66	270	286	1220	Fifth in League	Out of playoffs
1973–74	Seattle Totems	78	32	42	4	68	288	319	0	Fifth in League	Out of playoffs
1974–75	Seattle Totems	78	29	38	11	69	258	296	1113	Fourth in Northern	Out of playoffs

== See also ==
- Ice hockey in Seattle
- Pioneer Square totem pole
