= 1958 Allan Cup =

Canadian senior ice hockey championship

The Allan Cup trophy

The 1958 Allan Cup was the Canadian Amateur Hockey Association (CAHA) senior ice hockey championship for the 1957–58 senior "A" season. The event was hosted by the Kelowna Packers and Kelowna and Kamloops, British Columbia. The 1958 playoff marked the 50th time that the Allan Cup has been awarded.

The Belleville McFarlands, of the Ontario Hockey Association, defeated the Kelowna Packers to win the Allan Cup, also earning the right represent Canada at the following year's 1959 Ice Hockey World Championships, where they would win Canada's 18th world title.

== Intermediate teams ==
In August 1957, Alberta Amateur Hockey Association president Art Potter appealed to the CAHA to allow the Allan Cup competition to be opened up to intermediate level teams strengthened by additional players from their local regions. He wanted to see more branches of the CAHA able to enter competitive teams, rather than only the senior teams in Ontario and British Columbia. The 1958 Allan Cup was the first where the CAHA allowed intermediate level teams outside of Ontario and British Columbia to add to their rosters, limited to six players each, to enter a competitive team for the national playoffs.

== Teams ==
- Belleville McFarlands (Eastern Canadian Champions)
- Kelowna Packers (Western Canadian Champions)

== Playdowns ==
=== Allan Cup Best-of-Seven Series ===
Belleville McFarlands 4 - Kelowna Packers 1, Monday April 21.
Kelowna Packers 6 - Belleville McFarlands 0, Wednesday April 23.
Kelowna Packers 3 - Belleville McFarlands 0, Friday April 25.
Kelowna Packers 4 - Belleville McFarlands 3, Saturday April 26.
Belleville McFarlands 4 - Kelowna Packers 2, Monday April 28.
Belleville McFarlands 4 - Kelowna Packers 3, Wednesday April 30.
Belleville McFarlands 8 - Kelowna Packers 5, Thursday May 1.

=== Eastern Playdowns ===
Quarter-final

Hull Legion defeated New Glasgow Rangers 3-games-to-2

New Glasgow Rangers 4 - Hull Legion 1
Hull Legion 5 - New Glasgow Rangers 3
New Glasgow Rangers 5 - Hull Legion 4
Hull Legion 4 - New Glasgow Rangers 0
Hull Legion 5 - New Glasgow Rangers 2

Belleville McFarlands defeated South Porcupine 3-games-to-none

Belleville McFarlands 4 - South Porcupine 0
Belleville McFarlands 9 - South Porcupine 0
Belleville McFarlands 6 - South Porcupine 5

Semi-final

Belleville McFarlands defeated Kitchener-Waterloo Flying Dutchmen 4-games-to-1

Belleville McFarlands 5 - Kitchener-Waterloo Flying Dutchmen 4
Belleville McFarlands 5 - Kitchener-Waterloo Flying Dutchmen 4
Belleville McFarlands 5 - Kitchener-Waterloo Flying Dutchmen 2
Kitchener-Waterloo Flying Dutchmen 6 - Belleville McFarlands 2
Belleville McFarlands 4 - Kitchener-Waterloo Flying Dutchmen 1

Levis defeated Hull Legion 3-games-to-2

Hull Legion 7 - Levis 3
Levis 4 - Hull Legion 3
Levis 5 - Hull Legion 3
Hull Legion 3 - Levis 2
Levis 7 - Hull Legion 1

Final

Belleville McFarlands defeated Levis via default

Belleville McFarlands 12 - Levis 3
Belleville McFarlands 6 - Levis 0

=== Western Playdowns ===
Quarter-final

Red Deer Rustlers defeated Regina Caps 3-games-to-1

Red Deer Rustlers 8 - Regina Caps 6
Red Deer Rustlers 7 - Regina Caps 5
Regina Caps 5 - Red Deer Rustlers 1
Red Deer Rustlers 5 - Regina Caps 3

Winnipeg Maroons defeated Fort William Beavers 3-games-to-1

Winnipeg Maroons 4 - Fort William Beavers 2
Winnipeg Maroons 2 - Fort William Beavers 0
Fort William Beavers 2 - Winnipeg Maroons 0
Winnipeg Maroons 4 - Fort William Beavers 2

Semi-final

Winnipeg Maroons defeated Red Deer Rustlers 3-games-to-1

Red Deer Rustlers 3 - Winnipeg Maroons 1
Winnipeg Maroons 2 - Red Deer Rustlers 1
Winnipeg Maroons 6 - Red Deer Rustlers 3
Winnipeg Maroons 9 - Red Deer Rustlers 2

Final

Kelowna Packers defeated Winnipeg Maroons 4-games-to-1

Kelowna Packers 5 - Winnipeg Maroons 0
Kelowna Packers 4 - Winnipeg Maroons 1
Winnipeg Maroons 5 - Kelowna Packers 1
Kelowna Packers 6 - Winnipeg Maroons 2
Kelowna Packers 3 - Winnipeg Maroons 1

== Other ==
Hockey Hall of Fame inductee Fred Page, refereed games during the Cup.
