= 1959 Ice Hockey World Championships =

1959 edition of the World Ice Hockey Championships

Tournament details
- Host country: Czechoslovakia
- Dates: 5–15 March
- Teams: 12

Final positions
- Champions: Canada (18th title)
- Runners-up: Soviet Union
- Third place: Czechoslovakia
- Fourth place: United States

Tournament statistics
- Games played: 48
- Goals scored: 397 (8.27 per game)
- Attendance: 406,601 (8,471 per game)
- Scoring leader: (Canada) Red Berenson (13 points)

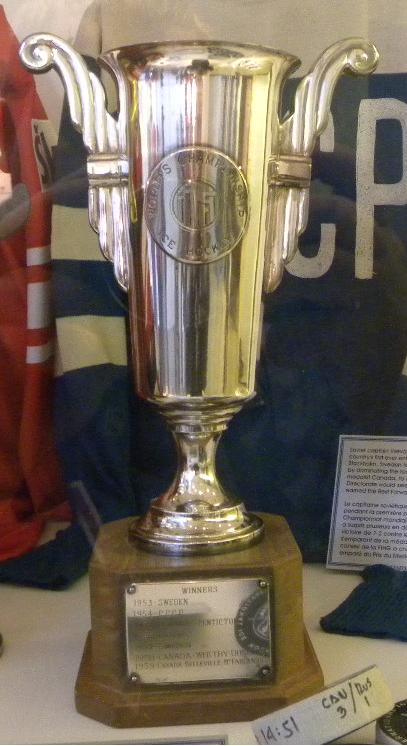
Trophy awarded for the 1959 World Championships

The 1959 Ice Hockey World Championships were held between 5 March and 15 March 1959, in Prague, and six other cities in Czechoslovakia. Canada, represented by the Belleville McFarlands, won their 18th World championship, winning every game but their last. The Soviet Union finished second, claiming their fifth European title followed by the host Czechoslovaks. In the consolation round, West Germany played against East Germany for the first time in a World Championship, winning easily, 8–0. The Canadian games were broadcast on CJBQ radio by Jack Devine.

== World Championship Group A (Czechoslovakia) ==
=== First round ===
Twelve teams played in three groups where first and second place advanced to the final round, while the 3rd and 4th place teams competed in a consolation round.

==== Group 1 ====
Played in Bratislava.

Pos	Team	Pld	W	D	L	GF	GA	GD	Pts
1	Canada	3	3	0	0	39	2	+37	6
2	Czechoslovakia	3	2	0	1	24	8	+16	4
3	Switzerland	3	1	0	2	8	35	−27	2
4	Poland	3	0	0	3	4	30	−26	0

5 March	Czechoslovakia	9–0	Switzerland

5 March	Canada	9–0	Poland

6 March	Canada	23–0	Switzerland

6 March	Czechoslovakia	13–1	Poland

7 March	Poland	3–8	Switzerland

7 March	Canada	7–2	Czechoslovakia

==== Group 2 ====
Played in Brno.

Pos	Team	Pld	W	D	L	GF	GA	GD	Pts
1	Soviet Union	3	3	0	0	24	5	+19	6
2	United States	3	2	0	1	22	10	+12	4
3	Norway	3	1	0	2	10	26	−16	2
4	East Germany	3	0	0	3	6	21	−15	0

5 March	Soviet Union	6–1	East Germany

5 March	Norway	3–10	United States

6 March	United States	9–2	East Germany

6 March	Norway	1–13	Soviet Union

7 March	East Germany	3–6	Norway

7 March	Soviet Union	5–3	United States

==== Group 3 ====
Played in Ostrava.

Pos	Team	Pld	W	D	L	GF	GA	GD	Pts
1	Sweden	3	2	1	0	21	5	+16	5
2	Finland	3	1	1	1	13	12	+1	3
3	West Germany	3	1	0	2	11	13	−2	2
4	Italy	3	1	0	2	7	22	−15	2

5 March	Sweden	11–0	Italy

5 March	Finland	5–3	West Germany

6 March	Italy	2–7	West Germany

6 March	Sweden	4–4	Finland

7 March	Italy	5–4	Finland

7 March	West Germany	1–6	Sweden

=== Final Round ===
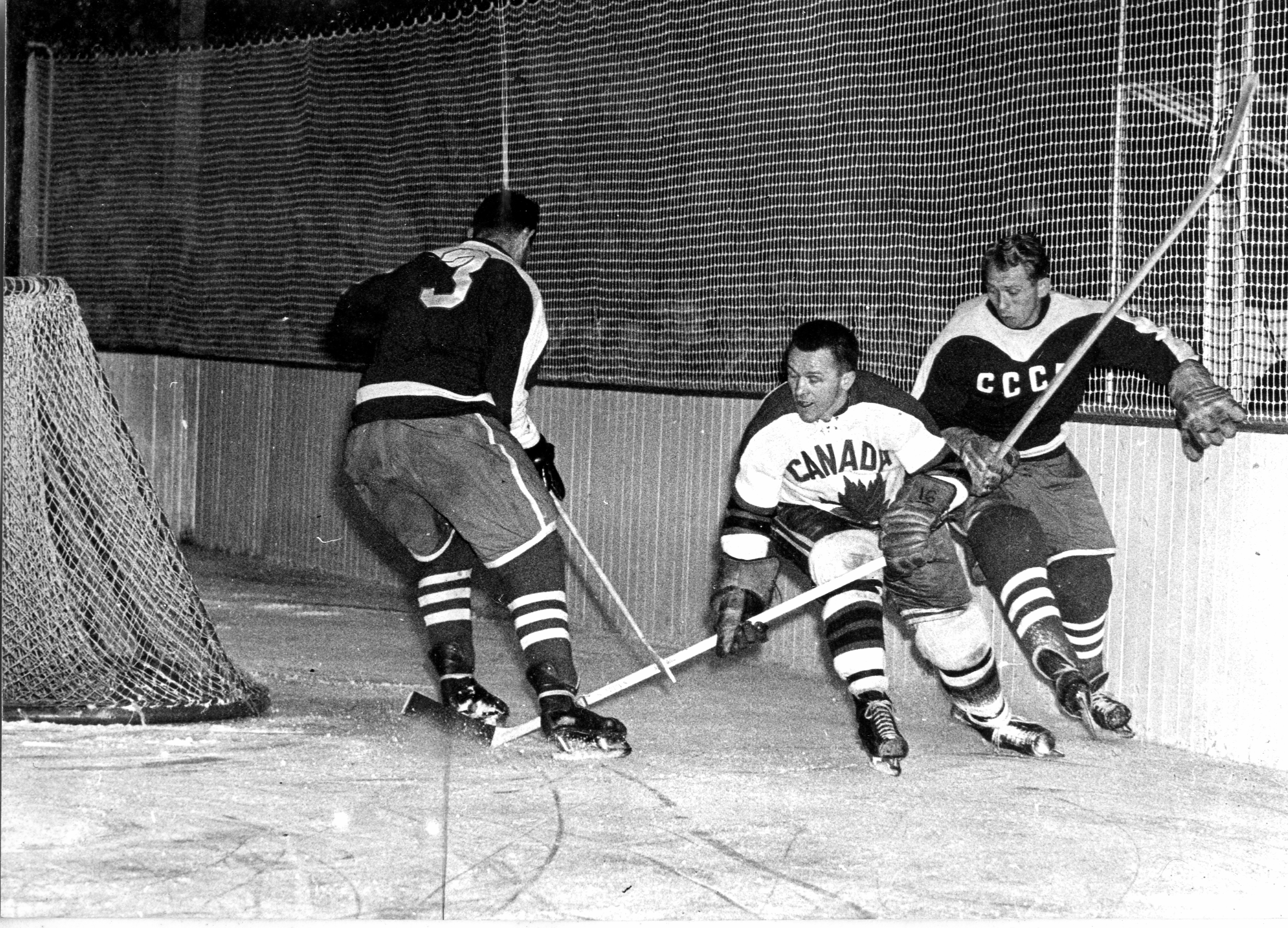
Canada - Soviet Union

Played in Prague. Canada finished first by virtue of a better goal differential, 14 to 10. The Czechoslovaks captured bronze in dramatic fashion, they needed to win against the previously undefeated Canadians in the final game and by enough of a margin to beat out the Americans on tie-breakers. By scoring an empty net goal in the dying moments of the final game the Czechoslovaks equaled the Americans on points (6 each), and goal differential (8 each). The final tie-breaker was goal average, in which the Czechoslovaks had the advantage 1.57 to 1.53.

Pos	Team	Pld	W	D	L	GF	GA	GD	Pts
1	Canada	5	4	0	1	21	7	+14	8
2	Soviet Union	5	4	0	1	20	10	+10	8
3	Czechoslovakia	5	3	0	2	22	14	+8	6
4	United States	5	3	0	2	23	15	+8	6
5	Sweden	5	1	0	4	6	21	−15	2
6	Finland	5	0	0	5	7	32	−25	0

9 March	Canada	6–0	Finland

9 March	Soviet Union	5–1	United States

9 March	Czechoslovakia	4–1	Sweden

10 March	Czechoslovakia	8–2	Finland

10 March	United States	7–1	Sweden

11 March	United States	10–3	Finland

11 March	Soviet Union	1–3	Canada

12 March	Canada	5–0	Sweden

12 March	Czechoslovakia	3–4	Soviet Union

13 March	Sweden	2–1	Finland

13 March	Czechoslovakia	2–4	United States

14 March	United States	1–4	Canada

14 March	Finland	1–6	Soviet Union

15 March	Soviet Union	4–2	Sweden

15 March	Czechoslovakia	5–3	Canada

=== Consolation round ===
Played in Kladno, Mladá Boleslav and Kolín.

Pos	Team	Pld	W	D	L	GF	GA	GD	Pts
7	West Germany	5	4	1	0	30	9	+21	9
8	Norway	5	3	1	1	20	20	0	7
9	East Germany	5	3	0	2	20	21	−1	6
10	Italy	5	2	1	2	20	17	+3	5
11	Poland	5	1	0	4	11	20	−9	2
12	Switzerland	5	0	1	4	8	22	−14	1

9 March	Poland	1–5	East Germany

9 March	Norway	4–4	Switzerland

9 March	West Germany	2–2	Italy

10 March	Italy	3–4	Norway

10 March	Poland	3–5	West Germany

10 March	East Germany	6–2	Switzerland

11 March	West Germany	8–0	East Germany

11 March	Switzerland	1–4	Italy

11 March	Norway	4–3	Poland

13 March	East Germany	8–6	Italy

13 March	West Germany	9–4	Norway

13 March	Switzerland	1–2	Poland

14 March	Switzerland	0–6	West Germany

14 March	Poland	2–5	Italy

14 March	Norway	4–1	East Germany

== World Championship Group B (Czechoslovakia) ==
Three other nations played a secondary tournament in Plzeň. A Czechoslovakia 'B' (junior) team also participated in the tournament. Had their games counted, they would've finished first.

=== Final Round ===
Pos	Team	Pld	W	D	L	GF	GA	GD	Pts
13	Romania	2	2	0	0	12	4	+8	4
14	Hungary	2	1	0	1	5	9	−4	2
15	Austria	2	0	0	2	4	8	−4	0

5 March	Hungary	3–2	Austria

6 March	Czechoslovakia B	3–0	Romania

7 March	Romania	5–2	Austria

8 March	Czechoslovakia B	7–1	Austria

9 March	Czechoslovakia B	17–2	Hungary

10 March	Romania	7–2	Hungary

== European Championship medal table ==
1st place, gold medalist(s)	Soviet Union
2nd place, silver medalist(s)	Czechoslovakia
3rd place, bronze medalist(s)	Sweden
4	Finland
5	West Germany
6	Norway
7	East Germany
8	Italy
9	Poland
10	Switzerland
11	Romania
12	Hungary
13	Austria

=== Tournament awards ===
- Best players selected by the directorate:
  - Best Goaltender: (Soviet Union) Nikolai Puchkov
  - Best Defenceman: (Canada) Jean Lamirande
  - Best Forward: (United States) Bill Cleary
