= 2017 Allan Cup =

Canadian senior ice hockey championship

The Allan Cup trophy

2017 Allan Cup logo

The 2017 Allan Cup was the Canadian championship of senior ice hockey and the 109th year the Allan Cup was awarded. The tournament was played at the J.K. Irving Centre in Bouctouche, New Brunswick from April 10 to 15, 2017 and won by the Grand Falls-Windsor Cataracts.

== Information ==
Kenora, Ontario was originally named the host city for the 2017 national championship. Following the dissolution of the Kenora Thistles senior hockey club in 2016, Hockey Canada awarded hosting duties to the community of Bouctouche and the Bouctouche Dodge Rams JCs.

Former professional hockey players competing in this year's Allan Cup were: Aaron Asham (Bouctouche), Ryan Bonni (South East), Steve Christie (South East), Ryan O'Marra (Stoney Creek), Terry Yake (South East), and Tyler Sloan (Grand Falls-Windsor).

== Participants ==
- Bouctouche Dodge Rams JCs (Host)
- Lacombe Generals (Pacific)

- 2009, 2013, and 2016 Allan Cup champions (as Bentley Generals)
- 19-3-0 record, 1st in ChHL.
- Defeated Fort Saskatchewan Chiefs 4-0; Defeated Stony Plain Eagles 4-2 to win league.
- Automatically advanced as British Columbia did not present a champion for McKenzie Cup.

- South East Prairie Thunder (West)

- 2012 and 2015 Allan Cup champions
- Defeated Île-des-Chênes North Stars 3-0 to win Pattison Cup.
- Defeated Rosetown Red Wings to win Rathgaber Cup.

- Stoney Creek Generals (Ontario)

- 18-4-2 record, 1st in ACH.
- Defeated Dundas Real McCoys 4-0, defeated Whitby Dunlops 4-1 to win league.
- Automatically advanced as Northwestern Ontario did not present a champion for Renwick Cup.

- Lamèque Au P'tit Mousse (Atlantic)

- Defeated Elsipogtog Hawks.
- No regional playoff as Newfoundland & Labrador representative awarded Quebec's berth.

- Grand Falls-Windsor Cataracts (Newfoundland & Labrador)

- Host region awarded Quebec's spot.
- Previous season's Herder Memorial Trophy winner.

== Map of teams ==
Host team Pacific participant West participant
Ontario participant Atlantic participant Newfoundland participant

== Round robin ==
Allan Cup Round Robin
Division One
| Rank | Team | Region | W-L-T | GF | GA |
| 1 | (Manitoba) Southeast | West | 1-1-0 | 8 | 6 |
| 2 | (Ontario) Stoney Creek | Central | 1-1-0 | 5 | 5 |
| 3 | (New Brunswick) Lamèque | Atlantic | 1-1-0 | 8 | 10 |
Division Two
| Rank | Team | Region | W-L-T | GF | GA |
| 1 | (Newfoundland and Labrador) Grand Falls-Windsor | Newfoundland | 2-0-0 | 5 | 3 |
| 2 | (Alberta) Lacombe | Pacific | 1-1-0 | 7 | 7 |
| 3 | (New Brunswick) Boutouche | Host | 0-2-0 | 5 | 7 |

Full standings and statistics available at Pointstreak.com.

=== Results ===
Round Robin results
| Game | Away team | Score | Home team | Score | Notes |
| 1 | Stoney Creek | 5 | Lamèque | 2 | Final |
| 2 | Grand Falls-Windsor | 2 | Bouctouche | 1 | Final |
| 3 | Southeast | 3 | Stoney Creek | 0 | Final |
| 4 | Bouctouche | 4 | Lacombe | 5 | Final (OT) |
| 5 | Lamèque | 6 | Southeast | 5 | Final (OT) |
| 6 | Lacombe | 2 | Grand Falls-Windsor | 3 | Final |

== Championship Round ==
=== Quarter and Semi-finals ===
Quarter and Semi-final results
| Game | Away team | Score | Home team | Score | Notes |
| 7 | Lamèque | 2 | Lacombe | 3 | Final (2OT) |
| 8 | Boutouche | 1 | Stoney Creek | 0 | Final (OT) |
| 9 | Lacombe | 8 | Southeast | 4 | Final |
| 10 | Boutouche | 2 | Grand Falls-Windsor | 5 | Final |

=== Final ===
| Allan Cup final: Game / Away team / Score / Home team / Score / Notes; 11 / Lacombe / 4 / Grand Falls-Windsor / 7 / Final |
