= Savage Cup =

The Savage Cup is the trophy that is awarded to British Columbia’s senior ice hockey champions. This trophy was first presented in 1912-13 to the ice hockey team fielded by the Vancouver Rowing Club. and the Savage Cup will be awarded to the BC provincial champions for the 2009-10 season.

Historically the Savage Cup winner was advanced directly to the Allan Cup playoffs, with the first playoff game against the Alberta champions. Over time, provincial senior hockey leagues became less common in Canada; starting with the 2009-10 season, the Savage Cup is awarded to the top British Columbia team at the Allan Cup, if one competes in that annual tournament.

== Savage Cup winners ==
The following teams have won the Savage Cup:

- 1912-13 - Vancouver Rowing Club
- 1913-14 - Fraser Mills Hockey Club
- 1914-15 - Vancouver B.B. Hockey Club
- 1915-16 - Vancouver B.B. Hockey Club
- 1916-17 - Vancouver Towers
- 1917-18 - Vancouver Towers
- 1918-19 - Vancouver Towers
- 1919-20 - Vancouver Towers
- 1920-21 - University of British Columbia
- 1921-22 - Vancouver Towers
- 1922-23 - Vancouver Young Liberals
- 1923-24 - Rossland Hockey Club
- 1924-25 - Rossland Hockey Club
- 1925-26 - Vancouver Towers
- 1926-27 - Trail Smoke Eaters
- 1927-28 - Trail Smoke Eaters
- 1928-29 - Trail Smoke Eaters
- 1929-30 - Trail Smoke Eaters
- 1930-31 - Trail Smoke Eaters
- 1931-32 - Trail Smoke Eaters
- 1932-33 - Trail Smoke Eaters
- 1933-34 - Kimberley Dynamiters
- 1934-35 - Kimberley Dynamiters
- 1935-36 - Kimberley Dynamiters
- 1936-37 - Nelson Maple Leafs
- 1937-38 - Trail Smoke Eaters
- 1938-39 - Kimberley Dynamiters
- 1939-40 - Trail Smoke Eaters
- 1940-41 - Trail Smoke Eaters
- 1941-42 - Kimberley Dynamiters
- 1942-43 - Victoria Army
- 1943-44 - New Westminster
- 1944-45 - No Competition
- 1945-46 - Trail Smoke Eaters
- 1946-47 - Kimberley Dynamiters
- 1947-48 - Trail Smoke Eaters
- 1948-49 - Trail Smoke Eaters
- 1949-50 - Kamloops Elks
- 1950-51 - Nanaimo Clippers
- 1951-52 - Trail Smoke Eaters
- 1952-53 - Penticton V's
- 1953-54 - Penticton V's
- 1954-55 - Vernon Canadians
- 1955-56 - Vernon Canadians
- 1956-57 - Spokane Flyers
- 1957-58 - Kelowna Packers
- 1958-59 - Vernon Canadians
- 1959-60 - Trail Smoke Eaters
- 1960-61 - Nelson Maple Leafs
- 1961-62 - Trail Smoke Eaters
- 1962-63 - not competed
- 1963-64 - Kimberley Dynamiters
- 1964-65 - Nelson Maple Leafs
- 1965-66 - Kimberley Dynamiters
- 1966-67 - Nelson Maple Leafs
- 1967-68 - Spokane Jets
- 1968-69 - Spokane Jets
- 1969-70 - Spokane Jets
- 1970-71 - Nelson Maple Leafs
- 1971-72 - Spokane Jets
- 1972-73 - Spokane Jets
- 1973-74 - Cranbrook Royals
- 1974-75 - Spokane Flyers
- 1975-76 - Spokane Flyers
- 1976-77 - Spokane Flyers
- 1977-78 - Kimberley Dynamiters
- 1978-79 - Trail Smoke Eaters
- 1979-80 - Spokane Flyers
- 1980-81 - Quesnel Kangaroos
- 1981-82 - Cranbrook Royals
- 1982-83 - Trail Smoke Eaters
- 1983-84 - Spokane Chiefs
- 1984-85 - Spokane Chiefs
- 1985-86 - Nelson Maple Leafs
- 1986-87 - Nelson Maple Leafs
- 1987-88 - Elk Valley Blazers
- 1988-89 - No Competition
- 1989-90 - No Competition
- 1990-91 - Abbotsford Flyers
- 1991-92 - Abbotsford Flyers
- 1992-93 - Whitehorse Huskies
- 1993-94 - Penticton Silver Bullets
- 1994-95 - Powell River Regals
- 1995-96 - Powell River Regals
- 1996-97 - Powell River Regals
- 1997-98 - Powell River Regals
- 1998-99 - Powell River Regals
- 1999-00 - Powell River Regals
- 2000-01 - Powell River Regals
- 2001-02 - Powell River Regals
- 2002-03 - Powell River Regals
- 2003-04 - Trail Smoke Eaters
- 2004-05 - Powell River Regals
- 2005-06 - Powell River Regals
- 2006-07 - Fort St. John Flyers
- 2007-08 - Fort St. John Flyers
- 2008-09 - Fort St. John Flyers
- 2009-10 - Fort St. John Flyers
- 2010-11 - Fort St. John Flyers
- 2011-12 - Powell River Regals
- 2012-13 - Fort St. John Flyers
- 2013-14 - Powell River Regals
- 2014-15 - Powell River Regals (Note: Powell River Regals qualified as the BC representative to 2015 Allan Cup, but chose not to compete in BC-Alberta McKenzie Cup championship to determine Pacific representative to Allan Cup Round Robin)
- 2015-16 - not awarded (Note: No BC team competed for the BC-Alberta McKenzie Cup championship to determine Pacific representative to Allan Cup Round Robin)
- 2016-17 - not awarded
- 2017-18 - not awarded
- 2018-19 - not awarded
- 2019-20 - not competed, COVID-19 pandemic
- 2020-21 - not competed, COVID-19 pandemic
- 2021-22 - not competed, COVID-19 pandemic
