= 2019 Allan Cup =

Canadian senior ice hockey championship

The Allan Cup trophy

2019 Allan Cup logo

The 2019 Allan Cup was the Canadian championship of senior ice hockey and the 111th year the Allan Cup was awarded. The tournament played in Lacombe, Alberta from April 8–13, 2019. The Lacombe Generals defeated the Innisfail Eagles 5–2 in the final to win the national championship.

== Information ==
Hockey Canada named the Lacombe Generals and city of Lacombe, Alberta and the host team and city of the 2019 Allan Cup on January 17, 2018. The Generals previously hosted the 2013 Allan Cup in Red Deer.

== Participants ==
- Lacombe Generals (Host)

- 2009, 2013, and 2016 Allan Cup champions (as Bentley Generals).
- 10-6-2 record, 1st in ACHW
- Defeated Stony Plain Eagles 3-1; defeated Innisfail Eagles 3-0 to win league.

- Innisfail Eagles (Pacific)

- 9-8-1 record, 3rd in ACHW.
- Defeated Rosetown Redwings 3-1; defeated by Lacombe Generals 3-0 in league playoffs.
- Automatically advance as British Columbia will not present a champion for McKenzie Cup and Lacombe Generals qualified as host team.

- Rosetown Redwings (Saskatchewan)

- 6-11-1 record, 4th in ACHW
- Defeated by Innisfail Eagles 3-0 in league playoffs.
- Advance by default as only team in Saskatchewan.

- South East Prairie Thunder (Manitoba)

- 2012 and 2015 Allan Cup champions.
- Defeated Ste. Anne Aces 3-0 to win Pattison Cup series.

- Stoney Creek Generals (Ontario)

- 2018 Allan Cup champions.
- 18-5-1 record, 1st in ACH
- Defeated Dundas Real McCoys 4-1, defeated Whitby Dunlops 4-games-to-0 to win league.
- Automatically advanced as Northwestern Ontario did not present a champion for Renwick Cup.

- Haut-Madawaska Panthers (Atlantic)

- 21-5-2 record, 1st in CHSRL
- Defeated Témiscouata Predators 4-2; defeated by St-Quentin Castors 4-3 in league playoffs.
- Automatically advance as 2018 champions and no other Atlantic provinces will participate in this year's Allan Cup playoffs.

== Map of teams ==
Host team Pacific participant Saskatchewan participant
Manitoba participant Ontario participant Atlantic participant

== Round robin ==
Allan Cup Round Robin
Division One
Rank	Team	Region	W-L-T	GF	GA
1	Stoney Creek	Ontario	2-0-0	10	4
2	Rosetown	Saskatchewan	1-1-0	7	9
3	Innisfail	Pacific	0-2-0	4	9
Division Two
Rank	Team	Region	W-L-T	GF	GA
1	Lacombe	Host	1-1-0	8	6
2	Haut Madawaska	Atlantic	1-1-0	6	7
3	South East	Manitoba	1-1-0	5	6

Full standings and statistics available at Pointstreak.com.

=== Results ===
Round Robin results
Game	Away team	Score	Home team	Score	Notes
1	Rosetown	4	Innisfail	3	Final
2	South East	4	Lacombe	2	Final
3	Innisfail	1	Stoney Creek	4	Final
4	Lacombe	6	Haut-Madawaska	2	Final
5	Stoney Creek	6	Rosetown	3	Final
6	Haut-Madawaska	4	South East	1	Final

== Championship Round ==
=== Quarter and Semi-finals ===
Quarter and Semifinal results
Game	Away team	Score	Home team	Score	Notes
7	South East	2	Rosetown	4	Final
8	Innisfail	5	Haut-Madawaska	1	Final
9	Innisfail	3	Stoney Creek	2	Final
10	Rosetown	1	Lacombe	3	Final

=== Final ===
Allan Cup final: Game / Away team / Score / Home team / Score / Notes; 11 / Innisfail / 2 / Lacombe / 5 / Final
