= 2018 Allan Cup =

Canadian senior ice hockey championship

The Allan Cup trophy

2018 Allan Cup logo

The 2018 Allan Cup was the Canadian championship of senior ice hockey and the 110th year the Allan Cup was awarded. The tournament played in Rosetown, Saskatchewan from April 9 to 14, 2018. The Stoney Creek Generals defeated the Lacombe Generals 7–4 to win the national championship.

== Information ==
Rosetown, Saskatchewan was named the host community in November 2016.

Notable players competing in this tournament include Ian White, Ryan O'Marra, and Lukas Sutter.

== Participants ==
- Rosetown Red Wings (Host)

- 20-2-0-2 record, 1st in ACHW
- Defeated by Lacombe Generals 5-3 in league playoffs
- Defeated Bethune AGT Bulldogs 3-games-to-1 to win Saskatchewan championship

- Lacombe Generals (Pacific)

- 2009, 2013, and 2016 Allan Cup champions (as Bentley Generals)
- 18-4-0-2 record, 2nd in ACHW.
- Defeated Stony Plain Eagles 7-1; defeated Rosetown Red Wings 5-3 to win league
- Defeated Fort Saskatchewan Chiefs 4-games-to-0; defeated Stony Plain Eagles 4-games-to-1 to win Alberta championship
- Automatically advance as British Columbia will not present a champion for McKenzie Cup

- Bethune AGT Bulldogs (Saskatchewan)

- Defeated by Rosetown Red Wings 3-games-to-1
- Automatically advance as Rosetown is the host team

- South East Prairie Thunder (Manitoba)

- 2012 and 2015 Allan Cup champions
- Defeated Île-des-Chênes North Stars 3-games-to-0 to win Pattison Cup series.

- Stoney Creek Generals (Ontario)

- 15-7-2 record, 1st in ACH
- Defeated Dundas Real McCoys 4-games-to-0, defeated Whitby Dunlops 4-games-to-1 to win league.
- Automatically advanced as Northwestern Ontario did not present a champion for Renwick Cup.

- Elsipogtog Hawks (Atlantic)

- 7-5 record, 1st in NESHL
- 3-3 record, 2nd in playoff round robin; defeated Bouctouche Dodge Ram JCs 4-games-to-2 to win league
- Automatically advance as no other Atlantic provinces will participate in this year's Allan Cup playoffs

== Map of teams ==
Host team Pacific participant Saskatchewan participant
Manitoba participant Ontario participant Atlantic participant

== Round robin ==
Allan Cup Round Robin
Division One
Rank	Team	Region	W-L-T	GF	GA
1	South East	Manitoba	1-0-1	8	4
2	Bethune	Saskatchewan	0-0-2	3	3
3	Elsipogtog	Atlantic	0-1-1	3	7
Division Two
Rank	Team	Region	W-L-T	GF	GA
1	Lacombe	Pacific	1-0-1	6	4
2	Rosetown	Host	0-0-2	4	4
3	Stoney Creek	Ontario	0-1-1	6	8

Full standings and statistics available at Pointstreak.com.

=== Results ===
Round Robin results
Game	Away team	Score	Home team	Score	Notes
1	South East	2	Bethune	2	Final
2	Stoney Creek	3	Rosetown	3	Final
3	Elsipogtog	2	South East	6	Final
4	Rosetown	1	Lacombe	1	Final
5	Bethune	1	Elsipogtog	1	Final
6	Lacombe	5	Stoney Creek	3	Final

== Championship Round ==
=== Quarter and Semi-finals ===
Quarter and Semi-final results
Game	Away team	Score	Home team	Score	Notes
7	Stoney Creek	3	Bethune	2	Final
8	Elsipogtog	6	Rosetown	4	Final
9	Stoney Creek	5	South East	2	Final
10	Elsipogtog	1	Lacombe	4	Final

=== Final ===
Allan Cup final: Game / Away team / Score / Home team / Score / Notes; 7 / Stoney Creek / 7 / Lacombe / 4 / Final
