= 2010 Allan Cup =

Canadian senior ice hockey championship

The Allan Cup trophy

The 2010 Allan Cup was the Canadian championship of senior ice hockey. This tournament was the 102nd year that the Allan Cup has been awarded. The 2010 tournament was hosted by the City of Fort St. John, British Columbia and the Fort St. John Flyers.

== 2010 Allan Cup participants ==
- Fort St. John Flyers (host)
  Host of 2010 Allan Cup.
  12-3-2-1 Record in North Peace Hockey League (First in West Division).
  Did not participate in BC Sr. "AAA" Playdowns.
- Clarenville Caribous (Atlantic)
  Only Sr. "AAA" team East of Ontario
  16-6-0-2 Record in West Coast Senior Hockey League (first overall).
  Defeated Corner Brook Royals 4-0, defeated Grand Falls-Windsor Cataracts 4-2 to win WCSHL Playoffs.
  Defeated Conception Bay North CeeBee Stars 4-1 to win Herder Memorial Trophy.
- Bentley Generals (Alberta)
  19-1-0-0 Record in Chinook Hockey League (first overall).
  Defeated Stony Plain Eagles 2-1, defeated Fort Saskatchewan Chiefs 2-1 to win ChHL Championship.
  Defeated Fort Saskatchewan Chiefs 4-1 for Alberta "AAA" Championship.
  2009 Allan Cup Champions.
- Powell River Regals (Pacific)
  Played independent schedule in both Sr. "AAA" and "AA".
  Won Coy Cup BC Sr. "AA" tournament with 3-2 win over Mid-Island Blazers.
  Defeated Whitehorse Huskies 3-0 to win Pacific Seed.
- South East Prairie Thunder (Western)
  Played independent schedule.
  Defeated Steinbach North Stars 3-1 for Pattison Cup, defeated Lloydminster Border Kings 3-1 for Rathgaber Cup.
  2009 Allan Cup finalists.
- Dundas Real McCoys (Central)
  19-3-0-2 Record in Major League Hockey (first overall).
  Finished second in playoff round robin (5-3), defeated Whitby Dunlops 4-1 to win Robertson Cup.
  Defeated Kenora Thistles 2-0 to win Renwick Cup as Central Canada Champions.

== Map of teams ==
Host team Pacific participant Alberta participant
West participant Central participant Atlantic participant

== Round robin ==
Allan Cup Round Robin
Division One
Rank	Team	Region	W-L-T	GF	GA
1	Dundas Real McCoys	Central	1-0-1	7	5
2	South East Prairie Thunder	Western	1-1-0	5	5
3	Powell River Regals	Pacific	0-1-1	6	8
Division Two
Rank	Team	Region	W-L-T	GF	GA
1	Fort St. John Flyers	Host	2-0-0	13	4
2	Bentley Generals	Alberta	1-1-0	8	9
3	Clarenville Caribous	Atlantic	0-2-0	5	13

=== Results ===
Round Robin results
Game	Home team	Score	Away team	Score	Notes
1	South East Prairie Thunder	4	Powell River Regals	2	Final - Shots: 44-28 SPT
2	Fort St. John Flyers	7	Bentley Generals	1	Final - Shots: 40-33 FSJ
3	Dundas Real McCoys	3	South East Prairie Thunder	1	Final - Shots: 44-29 SPT
4	Clarenville Caribous	3	Fort St. John Flyers	6	Final - Shots: 37-29 FSJ
5	Powell River Regals	4	Dundas Real McCoys	4	OT Final - Shots: 36-34 DRM
6	Bentley Generals	7	Clarenville Caribous	2	Final - Shots: 43-40 Ben

== Championship Round ==
=== Quarter and Semi-finals ===
Quarter and Semi-final results
Game	Home team	Score	Away team	Score	Notes
QF1	South East Prairie Thunder	7	Clarenville Caribous	3	Final - Shots: 60-30 SPT
QF2	Bentley Generals	5	Powell River Regals	1	Final - Shots: 43-24 Ben
SF1	Dundas Real McCoys	2	Bentley Generals	4	Final - Shots: 45-36 Ben
SF2	Fort St. John Flyers	7	South East Prairie Thunder	3	Final - Shots: 35-29 FSJ

=== Final ===
Allan Cup final: Game / Home team / Score / Away team / Score / Notes; F / Fort St. John Flyers / 4 / Bentley Generals / 1 / Final - Shots: 33-25 FSJ

== National Playdowns ==
Listed are the registered teams per tournament seat.

=== Alberta ===
- Bentley Generals
- Fort Saskatchewan Chiefs
- Stony Plain Eagles

==== Brackets ====
Semi-finals
A	Bentley
Bye
A	Ft Saskatchewan	3
A	Stony Plain	2

Alberta Finals
A	Bentley	4
A	Ft Saskatchewan	1

=== Atlantic Canada ===
- Clarenville Caribous (Newfoundland and Labrador)
  - Clarenville automatically is entered into Allan Cup due to being the only registered Sr. AAA team in the region.

=== Pacific ===
==== Teams ====
- Fort St. John Flyers (Allan Cup hosts)
- Powell River Regals
- Whitehorse Huskies

==== Brackets ====
With Fort St. John already in the 2010 Allan Cup as hosts, it will be up to Powell River and Whitehorse to play a series for the British Columbia seed to the National Championship.

BC Championship
BC	Powell River	3
YT	Whitehorse	0

=== Western ===
==== Teams ====
Manitoba

- Manitoba Lightning
- Southeast Prairie Thunder
- Steinbach North Stars
valign=top width=30% |

Saskatchewan

- Lloydminster Border Kings
- Paradise Hill Hawks

==== Brackets ====
In Manitoba, Steinbach and Manitoba will square-off in a best-of-seven series to determine who faces Southeast for the Manitoba crown. In Saskatchewan, Paradise Hill and Lloydminster face-off for the Saskatchewan Sr. AAA championship. The winners of these two provinces will face each other to determine the Manitoba/Saskatchewan seed to the 2010 Allan Cup.

Provincial Semi-final
Manitoba
M	Steinbach	4
M	Manitoba	1
Saskatchewan

Semifinals
M	South East	3
M	Steinbach	0
S	Lloydminster	3
S	Paradise Hill	1

Interprovincial Final
M	South East	3
S	Lloydminster	1

=== Central ===
==== Teams ====
Major League Hockey

- Coldwater/Orillia Tundras
- Dundas Real McCoys
- Norwood Vipers
- Whitby Dunlops
valign=top width=30% |

Northwestern Ontario

- Fort Frances Thunderhawks
- Kenora Thistles
- Thunder Bay K&A Twins

==== Brackets ====
In Southern Ontario, the top three teams of Major League Hockey will play a double round robin and then the top two teams from the round robin will play a best-of-7 series to determine an Ontario Hockey Association champion. In Northwestern Ontario, a one-game per opponent round robin will determine a one-game runoff for the Hockey Northwestern Ontario crown. When the two teams are determined, they will meet in a best-of-3 series to determine the Ontario seed to the 2010 Allan Cup.

Regional Final
N1	Kenora	3
N2	Thunder Bay*	1
S2	Whitby	1
S1	Dundas	4

Renwick Cup
N1	Kenora	0
S1	Dundas	2

(*) Thunder Bay replaces Fort Frances, Fort Frances found to have an ineligible player.

Northern Round Robin

NO	Fort Frances	3	5	X
NO	Kenora	3	X	5
NO	Thunder Bay	X	5	1

valign=top width=55% |

Southern Round Robin

SO	Dundas	8	2	3	X	6	6	1	X	X	5	X	10
SO	Whitby	X	9	2	2	X	X	4	5	6	7	6	X
SO	Norwood	3	X	X	3	3	3	X	2	2	X	3	3
