= Darren Reid =

Canadian ice hockey player

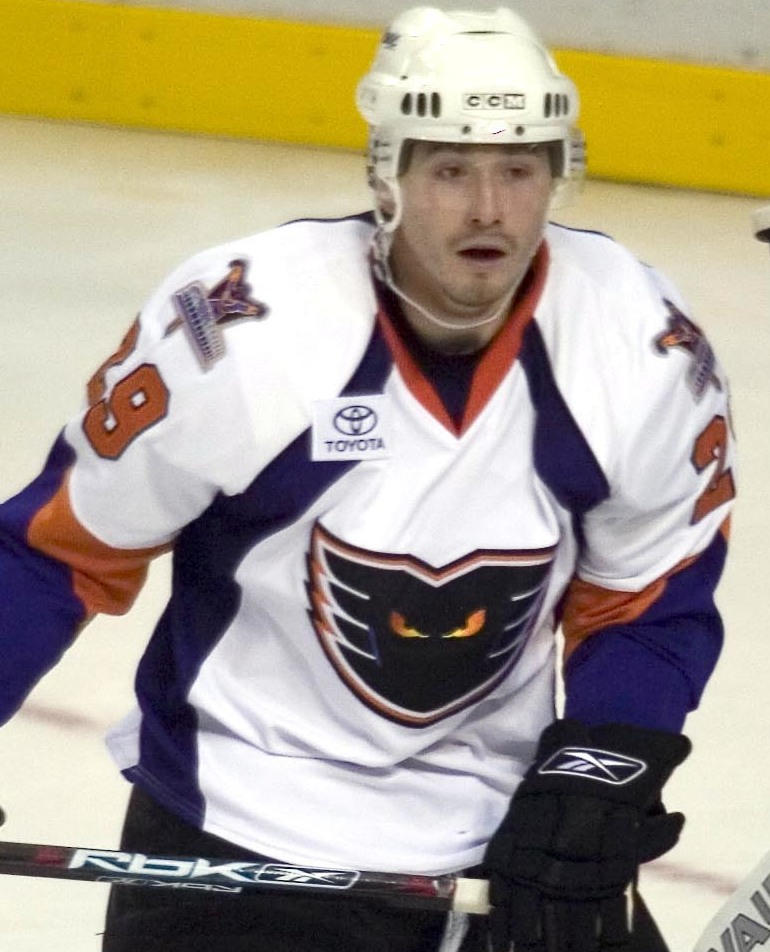
- Reid with the Philadelphia Phantoms in 2007
- Born: May 8, 1983 (age 43) Lac La Biche, Alberta, Canada
- Height: 6 ft 2 in (188 cm)
- Weight: 205 lb (93 kg; 14 st 9 lb)
- Position: Right wing
- Shot: Right
- Played for: Tampa Bay Lightning; Philadelphia Flyers
- NHL draft: 256th overall, 2002; Tampa Bay Lightning
- Playing career: 2004–2010

Darren Reid (born May 8, 1983) is a Métis former professional ice hockey right winger who played 21 National Hockey League (NHL) games for the Tampa Bay Lightning and Philadelphia Flyers. In 2018, he accepted a role as an assistant coach for the Drayton Valley Thunder.

== Playing career ==
Reid played three seasons of junior hockey with the Drayton Valley Thunder of the Alberta Junior Hockey League before joining the Western Hockey League (WHL).

Reid was drafted 256th overall by the Tampa Bay Lightning in the 2002 NHL entry draft, however he returned to the WHL for the next two seasons where he helped the Medicine Hat Tigers win the 2004 WHL Championship. In 2005, Reid attended the Lightning's training camp but was reassigned to their American Hockey League (AHL) affiliate, the Springfield Falcons, prior to the 2005–06 season. Reid was recalled from the AHL on December 16 after recording 10 points in 21 games. He played his first career NHL game the following night on December 17, 2005, against the Detroit Red Wings and was reassigned to the AHL on December 27.

Reid was traded to the Philadelphia Flyers on November 9, 2006, for Daniel Corso. After two seasons with the Flyers AHL affiliate, the Philadelphia Phantoms, Reid signed a one-year contract with the Hershey Bears for the 2008–09 season. He won the Calder Cup with the Bears that season. After playing a few games in the ECHL, Reid then signed a contract with the Heilbronn Falcons for the rest of the 2009–10 season.

After retiring from hockey, Reid joined the Drayton Valley Thunder as an assistant coach in 2018.

== Career statistics ==
			Regular season					Playoffs
Season	Team	League	GP	G	A	Pts	PIM	GP	G	A	Pts	PIM
1999–2000	Drayton Valley Thunder	AJHL	2	0	1	1	0	—	—	—	—	—
1999–2000	Trail Smoke Eaters	BCHL	1	0	0	0	0	—	—	—	—	—
2000–01	Drayton Valley Thunder	AJHL	55	8	18	26	116	—	—	—	—	—
2001–02	Medicine Hat Tigers	WHL	37	8	9	17	70	—	—	—	—	—
2001–02	Drayton Valley Thunder	AJHL	31	9	12	21	195	—	—	—	—	—
2002–03	Medicine Hat Tigers	WHL	63	14	30	44	163	11	5	0	5	19
2003–04	Medicine Hat Tigers	WHL	67	33	48	81	194	20	13	8	21	31
2004–05	Springfield Falcons	AHL	56	3	19	22	99	—	—	—	—	—
2005–06	Springfield Falcons	AHL	50	8	9	17	59	—	—	—	—	—
2005–06	Tampa Bay Lightning	NHL	7	0	1	1	0	—	—	—	—	—
2006–07	Springfield Falcons	AHL	10	1	0	1	5	—	—	—	—	—
2006–07	Philadelphia Phantoms	AHL	43	16	14	30	20	—	—	—	—	—
2006–07	Philadelphia Flyers	NHL	14	0	0	0	18	—	—	—	—	—
2007–08	Philadelphia Phantoms	AHL	41	8	13	21	37	9	1	2	3	0
2008–09	Hershey Bears	AHL	38	2	3	5	61	7	3	0	3	18
2009–10	Hershey Bears	AHL	21	6	2	8	20	—	—	—	—	—
2009–10	Reading Royals	ECHL	1	0	2	2	0	—	—	—	—	—
2009–10	South Carolina Stingrays	ECHL	2	1	0	1	2	—	—	—	—	—
2009–10	Heilbronner Falken	GER.2	8	0	4	4	8	3	0	0	0	2
2011–12	Sylvan Lake Admirals	ChHL	1	0	0	0	0	—	—	—	—	—
2012–13	Lakeland Eagles	NPHL	3	4	2	6	2	—	—	—	—	—
2013–14	Lakeland Eagles	NPHL	7	20	12	32	10	—	—	—	—	—
2014–15	Fort Saskatchewan Chiefs	ChHL	3	3	1	4	2	4	1	1	2	6
2015–16	Fort Saskatchewan Chiefs	ChHL	2	0	0	0	0	—	—	—	—	—
2017–18	Fort Saskatchewan Chiefs	ACHW	6	3	3	6	6	—	—	—	—	—
2018–19	Innisfail Eagles	AC	—	—	—	—	—	3	2	1	3	6
2019–20	Innisfail Eagles	ACHW	4	2	0	2	2	—	—	—	—	—
AHL totals			259	44	60	104	301	16	4	2	6	18
NHL totals			21	0	1	1	18	—	—	—	—	—
