= Sean Blanchard =

Canadian ice hockey player (born 1978)

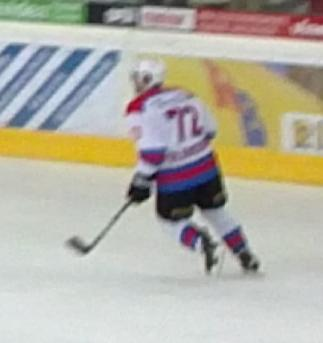
- Born: March 29, 1978 (age 48) Sudbury, Ontario, Canada
- Height: 5 ft 11 in (180 cm)
- Weight: 198 lb (90 kg; 14 st 2 lb)
- Position: Defence
- Shoots: Left
- ACH team Former teams: Brantford Blast; Mississippi Sea Wolves; Lowell Lock Monsters; Florida Everblades; London Knights; Ritten Sport; GCK Lions; Augusta Lynx; Iserlohn Roosters; Freezers; Frankfurt Lions; Thomas Sabo Ice Tigers; Grizzly Adams Wolfsburg; Stoney Creek Generals
- National team: Canada
- NHL draft: 99th overall, 1997; Los Angeles Kings
- Playing career: 1998–present

Sean Blanchard (born March 29, 1978) is a Canadian professional ice hockey defenceman who last played for the Brantford Blast in Allan Cup Hockey. He was selected by the Los Angeles Kings in the fourth round (99th overall) of the 1997 NHL entry draft, and spent most of his professional career in Europe.

== Playing career ==
=== Junior ===
Sean Blanchard started his junior hockey career with the Valley East Cobras of the Great North Midget League. Following a successful season with the Cobra's, Blanchard was drafted 13th overall by the Ottawa 67's in the 1994 OHL Priority Draft. He would go on to play for the 67's during all four years of his junior eligibility. During his third season in Ottawa, he had a breakout year winning several awards including the Max Kaminsky Trophy, CHL Defenceman of the Year, as well as being named as both an OHL and CHL First Team All Star. As a result of his play, Blanchard was drafted in the fourth round of the 1997 NHL entry draft by the Los Angeles Kings. Blanchard returned to the capital as an overage player, where his was once again named as an OHL First Team All Star, and narrowly lost winning his second Max Kaminsky Trophy to fellow OHL All Star Chris Allen. Following the culmination of his fourth year in Ottawa, Blanchard turned professional.

=== Professional career ===
==== North America ====
Upon turning professional, Blanchard split time between the Springfield Falcons of the AHL and the Mississippi Sea Wolves of the ECHL, both of whom were the Kings' farm teams. He would spend the majority of the season with the Sea Wolves, and helped the team win the Kelly Cup, beating the Richmond Renegades in the finals. The Kings would change their farm teams in the off-season, and as a result Blanchard would spend the 1999–00 season with both the AHL's Lowell Lock Monsters and the ECHL's Trenton Titans. The following season, Blanchard would primarily play for Florida Everblades of the ECHL, but would also dress for the Grand Rapids Griffins and Manitoba Moose, both of the IHL. In Florida he would have a decent season, scoring 30 points in 51 games.

==== Europe ====
Following his time in Florida, Blanchard moved the Europe in order to play for the London Knights of the BISL. His first season with the Knights saw the team qualify for the playoffs, before narrowly losing to the Sheffield Steelers in the semi-finals. In his second year with the Knights, the team would make it to the playoff final, ultimately losing to the Belfast Giants. Following the culmination of the 2002–03 season, the team would fold as a result of their rink, the London Arena, being sold to developers. This, coupled with the Ayr Scottish Eagles and Manchester Storm also folding, and the Bracknell Bees deciding to drop down to the BNL, culminated in the demise of the BISL.

Following the dissolution of the Knights, Blanchard moved to Italy, signing with Serie A side SV Ritten for the 2003–04 season. In his first season in Italy, Blanchard would have a great season, scoring 49 points in 41 games, tying Kent Simpson as the team's top scorer. He would remain with the team for the following season, tallying 24 points in 36 games. For the 2005–06 season, Blanchard moved across the border to Zürich. There, Blanchard played sparingly for ZSC Lions of the NLA, but also played for GCK Lions of the NLB, ZSC's affiliate team. Blanchard returned to North America for a season, splitting time between the AHL's Portland Pirates and their ECHL affiliate Augusta Lynx; he had a strong season with the Lynx, scoring 47 points in 57 games, and was named as a Second Team All-Star.

For the 2007–08 season, Blanchard returned to Europe in order to play for DEL side Iserlohn Roosters, where he had a solid season, tallying 24 points in 46 games, helping the team to a 5th-place finish. At the culmination of the season, Blanchard remained in Germany, but moved to the Hamburg Freezers, registering 20 points in 51 games as the team finished 8th. He then joined another DEL side Frankfurt Lions for the 2009–10 season. The Lions had a strong season, finishing 2nd during the regular season before losing to 7th seed ERC Ingolstadt in the first round the playoffs. For the 2010–11 season, Blanchard moved to the Nürnberg Ice Tigers, helping the team finish 10th. He then returned to Iserlohn for the 2011–12 season, however, the team struggled, finishing 10th. One more season in Germany would follow, with Grizzlys Adams Wolfsburg. The team would also finish 10th, however would qualify for the playoffs, before losing to Kölner Haie in the semi-finals. Following his 6th season in Germany, Blanchard retired from professional hockey.

=== Allan Cup Hockey ===
Despite retiring as a professional, Blanchard continued to play, signing with the newly formed senior hockey team Stoney Creek Generals, of Allan Cup Hockey. Upon joining the Generals, he reunited with former Knights teammate Dennis Maxwell. Between 2016 and 2019, the Generals would win the league four times on a trot, and in 2018 would go on to win the Allan Cup, beating the Lacombe Generals in the final. Following the culmination of the 2018–19 season, the Generals were sold and relocated, thus becoming the Brantford Blast. Blanchard was named team captain - a position he held for the previous two season in Stoney Creek - and the team made it to the ACH Finals against the Hamilton Steelhawks. The finals were cancelled, however, as a result of the ongoing COVID-19 pandemic.

As of July 2020, Blanchard was the last remaining active member of the former London Knights.

=== International ===
Blanchard was named to the Canadian team for the 1998 World Junior Championships. The team lost in the quarterfinals to Russia, during which game Blanchard registered his only point of the tournament, assisting on a Daniel Tkaczuk goal.

Blanchard dressed for the Canadian National Team for 2005 editions of the Loto Cup and the Deutschland Cup. He was again a member of the national team during the 2008 Deutschland Cup, which Canada won, and would again dress for the team in the 2010 edition of the tournament.

== Awards ==
- CHL Defenceman of the Year (1997)
- Max Kaminsky Trophy (1997)
- CHL First Team All-Star (1997)
- OHL First Team All-Star (1997)
- OHL First Team All-Star (1998)
- ECHL Kelly Cup Champion (1999)
- ECHL Second All-Star Team (2007)
- Allan Cup Champion (2018)

== Career statistics ==
=== Regular season and playoffs ===
			Regular season					Playoffs
Season	Team	League	GP	G	A	Pts	PIM	GP	G	A	Pts	PIM
1993–94	Valley East Cobras	GNML	35	50	17	50	46	—	—	—	—	—
1993–94	Espanola Eagles	NOJHL	1	50	0	50	0	—	—	—	—	—
1994–95	Ottawa 67's	OHL	59	50	5	50	24	—	—	—	—	—
1995–96	Ottawa 67's	OHL	64	50	29	50	49	4	1	3	4	7
1996–97	Ottawa 67's	OHL	66	50	57	50	64	24	3	15	18	34
1997–98	Ottawa 67's	OHL	57	50	51	50	43	14	0	6	6	29
1998–99	Springfield Falcons	AHL	10	50	1	50	4	—	—	—	—	—
1998–99	Mississippi Sea Wolves	ECHL	58	50	24	50	30	17	0	8	8	4
1999–2000	Lowell Lock Monsters	AHL	54	50	5	50	28	3	0	0	0	2
1999–2000	Trenton Titans	ECHL	2	50	0	50	0	—	—	—	—	—
2000–01	Florida Everblades	ECHL	51	50	25	50	60	5	0	2	2	2
2000–01	Grand Rapids Griffins	IHL	10	68	0	68	7	—	—	—	—	—
2000–01	Manitoba Moose	IHL	7	69	0	69	4	—	—	—	—	—
2001–02	London Knights	BISL	35	70	6	70	14	7	0	1	1	8
2002–03	London Knights	BISL	32	71	12	71	24	18	8	6	14	6
2003–04	SV Ritten	ITA	42	72	33	72	58	3	2	1	3	0
2004–05	Ritten Sport	ITA	36	73	19	73	28	6	2	3	5	12
2005–06	ZSC Lions	NLA	4	74	1	74	14	—	—	—	—	—
2005–06	GCK Lions	NLB	19	99	8	99	50	5	0	3	3	22
2006–07	Portland Pirates	AHL	13	100	6	100	12	—	—	—	—	—
2006–07	Augusta Lynx	ECHL	57	80	34	80	80	2	0	1	1	0
2007–08	Iserlohn Roosters	DEL	46	87	22	87	44	7	1	2	3	6
2008–09	Hamburg Freezers	DEL	51	86	18	86	77	9	0	3	3	8
2009–10	Frankfurt Lions	DEL	55	85	18	85	71	4	1	0	1	4
2010–11	Nürnberg Ice Tigers	DEL	52	84	14	84	38	2	0	0	0	4
2011–12	Iserlohn Roosters	DEL	25	92	15	92	22	1	0	0	0	0
2012–13	Grizzly Adams Wolfsburg	DEL	52	91	13	91	75	12	0	1	1	12
2013–14	Stoney Creek Generals	ACH	15	99	10	99	16	4	0	1	1	16
2014–15	Stoney Creek Generals	ACH	19	99	13	99	34	5	2	3	5	8
2015–16	Stoney Creek Generals	ACH	23	99	20	99	20	6	2	6	8	9
2016–17	Stoney Creek Generals	ACH	24	99	28	99	31	8	0	9	9	6
2017–18	Stoney Creek Generals	ACH	21	99	16	99	17	9	0	6	6	13
2017–18	Stoney Creek Generals	AC	—	99	50	99	99	5	1	1	2	6
2018–19	Stoney Creek Generals	ACH	21	99	10	99	99	7	0	2	2	2
2019–20	Brantford Blast	ACH	18	99	19	99	99	7	0	2	2	2
ECHL totals			168	99	83	106	170	24	0	11	11	6
DEL totals			281	99	100	115	327	35	2	6	8	34
ACH totals			141	99	97	118	162	46	4	29	33	58

=== International ===
Year	Team	Event	GP	G	A	Pts	PIM
1998	Canada	WJC	78	78	6	78	0

== Personal life ==
Blanchard's cousin is fellow professional hockey player Neal Martin, who also played for the London Knights.
