= Jeremy Colliton =

Canadian ice hockey player and coach

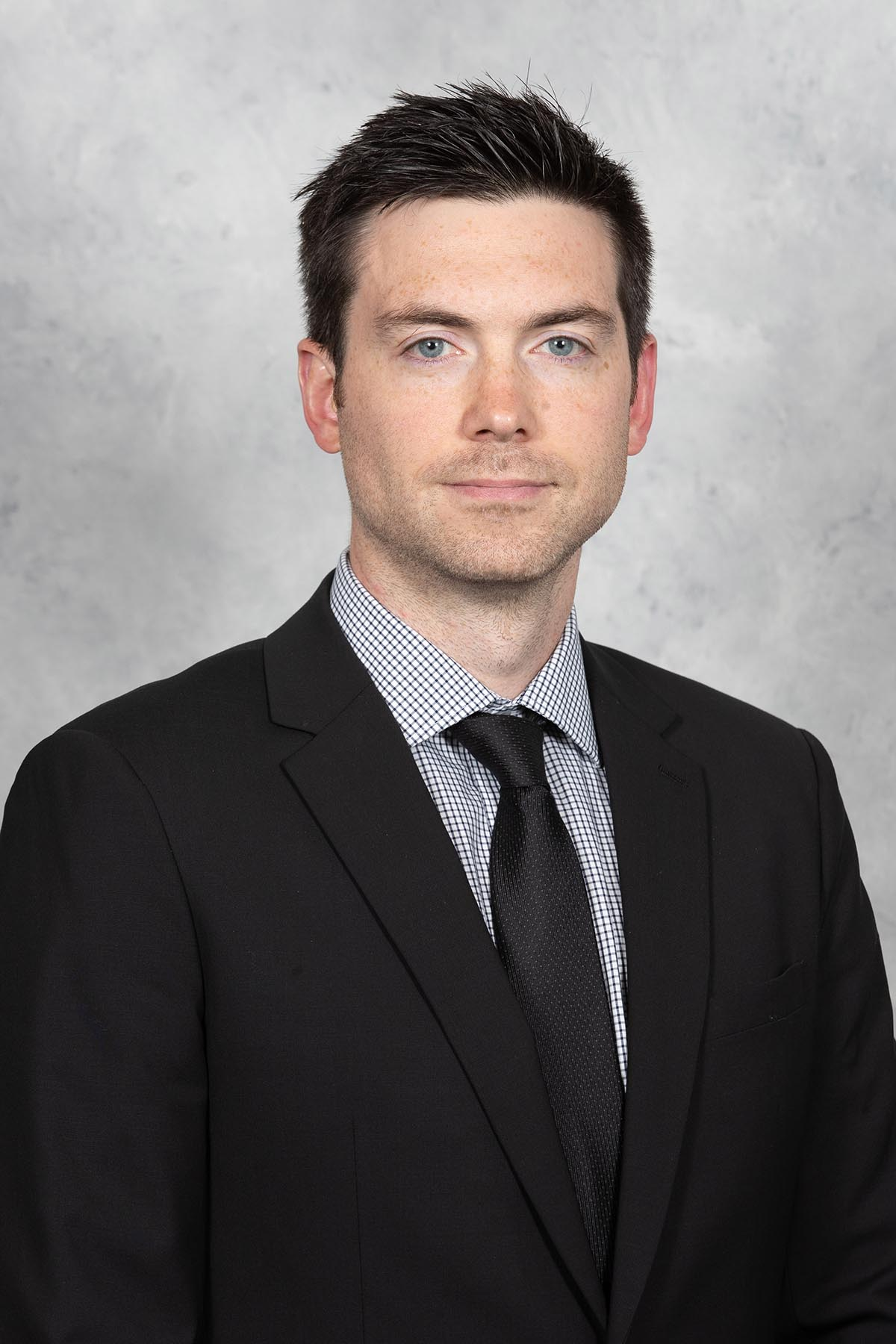
- Colliton in 2023
- Born: January 13, 1985 (age 41) Blackie, Alberta, Canada
- Height: 6 ft 2 in (188 cm)
- Weight: 214 lb (97 kg; 15 st 4 lb)
- Position: Centre
- Shot: Right
- Played for: New York Islanders; Rögle BK
- Coached for: Chicago Blackhawks
- NHL draft: 58th overall, 2003; New York Islanders
- Playing career: 2005–2013
- Coaching career: 2014–present

Jeremy Colliton (born January 13, 1985) is a Canadian professional ice hockey coach and former player. He is the current associate coach of the New Jersey Devils of the National Hockey League (NHL), and was previously head coach of the Chicago Blackhawks, and a player for the New York Islanders.

== Playing career ==
Colliton was drafted in the second round, 58th overall by the New York Islanders in the 2003 NHL entry draft from the Western Hockey League's Prince Albert Raiders.

In his rookie season Colliton played 19 National Hockey League games with the Islanders with one goal and one assist for two points and plus/minus 2 and 6 penalty minutes. With the Bridgeport Sound Tigers, the American Hockey League (AHL) affiliate of the Islanders, he had 21 goals and 32 assists in 66 games in his rookie season. He was also a part of the ADT Canada–Russia Challenge for Team WHL for 2004 and 2005, when he was also the alternate captain.

On June 19, 2009, Colliton signed with Rögle BK of the Swedish Elitserien.

To start the 2010–11 season, Colliton returned to the Islanders organization signing a contract with the Sound Tigers, before on November 30, 2010, signing a one-year, two-way contract with the New York Islanders.

On July 14, 2011, Colliton signed a one-year, two-way contract with the Islanders.

Whilst recovering from injury prior to the lockout-shortened 2012–13 season, Colliton struggled to find a professional club upon recovery and took the majority of the year off. On February 12, 2013, Colliton linked up with a senior ice hockey league team, the Bentley Generals, for the Allan Cup tournament.

On June 1, 2013, Colliton resumed his professional career signing a one-year deal in returning to Sweden with Mora IK of the HockeyAllsvenskan. After only three games with Mora, Colliton was unable to continue playing due to ongoing post-concussion syndrome.

== Personal life ==
Colliton has three children.

== International play ==
Colliton was part of the Canadian under-18 national team, which won gold medal in the 2003 IIHF World U18 Championships. He also played for the Canadian under-20 national team with whom he won silver medal in the 2004 World Junior Ice Hockey Championships and gold medal in 2005 World Junior Ice Hockey Championships.

== Coaching career ==
On January 9, 2014, he announced his retirement from professional hockey and was later chosen as Mora head coach in an interim role mid-season before signing on to be full-time coach.

On May 18, 2017, Colliton was named the head coach of the Rockford IceHogs of the American Hockey League (AHL), the affiliate of the Chicago Blackhawks.

On November 6, 2018, the Blackhawks promoted Colliton to become the 38th head coach in franchise history following the dismissal of Joel Quenneville. At the time of his hiring, Colliton became the youngest active head coach in the NHL. On November 8, in his NHL coaching debut the Blackhawks lost 4–3 to the Carolina Hurricanes.

On November 6, 2021, Colliton was fired after leading the team to a 1–9–2 start to the 2021–22 season.

On January 30, 2022, Colliton assumed head coaching duties of the Canadian Men's Olympic Team after Claude Julien suffered an injury. He led team Canada to victory in their first game of the tournament defeating Germany 5–1. Julien returned after game one and reassumed his head coaching duties, while Colliton returned to assistant coach.

On July 1, 2022, Colliton was named head coach of the Abbotsford Canucks of the AHL, replacing Trent Cull who received a promotion to assistant coach with the Vancouver Canucks. Colliton left the Canucks organization after two seasons despite the Canucks offer of a two-year contract, and was succeeded by Manny Malhotra.

== Career statistics ==
=== Regular season and playoffs ===
			Regular season					Playoffs
Season	Team	League	GP	G	A	Pts	PIM	GP	G	A	Pts	PIM
2000–01	Crowsnest Pass Timberwolves	AJHL	63	18	30	48	98	—	—	—	—	—
2001–02	Prince Albert Raiders	WHL	68	11	21	32	53	—	—	—	—	—
2002–03	Prince Albert Raiders	WHL	58	20	28	48	76	—	—	—	—	—
2003–04	Prince Albert Raiders	WHL	62	24	26	50	73	6	5	5	10	8
2004–05	Prince Albert Raiders	WHL	41	16	30	46	25	17	3	4	7	21
2005–06	Bridgeport Sound Tigers	AHL	66	21	32	53	44	6	0	1	1	2
2005–06	New York Islanders	NHL	19	1	1	2	6	—	—	—	—	—
2006–07	Bridgeport Sound Tigers	AHL	45	10	12	22	32	—	—	—	—	—
2006–07	New York Islanders	NHL	1	0	0	0	0	—	—	—	—	—
2007–08	Bridgeport Sound Tigers	AHL	65	9	11	20	44	—	—	—	—	—
2007–08	New York Islanders	NHL	16	0	0	0	8	—	—	—	—	—
2008–09	Bridgeport Sound Tigers	AHL	56	8	28	36	36	2	0	1	1	0
2008–09	New York Islanders	NHL	6	0	1	1	2	—	—	—	—	—
2009–10	Rögle BK	SEL	46	11	10	21	24	—	—	—	—	—
2010–11	Bridgeport Sound Tigers	AHL	53	18	27	45	57	—	—	—	—	—
2010–11	New York Islanders	NHL	15	2	1	3	10	—	—	—	—	—
2011–12	Bridgeport Sound Tigers	AHL	41	11	16	27	30	—	—	—	—	—
2012–13	Bentley Generals	ChHL	—	—	—	—	—	3	1	1	2	0
2012–13	Bentley Generals	AC	—	—	—	—	—	4	1	0	1	4
2013–14	Mora IK	SWE.3	3	0	3	3	0	—	—	—	—	—
AHL totals			326	77	126	203	243	8	0	2	2	2
NHL totals			57	3	3	6	26	—	—	—	—	—

Medal record

Representing Canada

Ice hockey

World Junior Championships
Gold medal – first place	2005 North Dakota	
Silver medal – second place	2004 Helsinki	

IIHF U18 Championships
Gold medal – first place	2003 Yaroslavl	

=== International ===
Year	Team	Event	Result	GP	G	A	Pts	PIM
2003	Canada	WJC18	1st place, gold medalist(s)	7	1	5	6	18
2004	Canada	WJC	2nd place, silver medalist(s)	6	0	0	0	2
2005	Canada	WJC	1st place, gold medalist(s)	1	0	0	0	0
Junior totals				14	1	5	6	20

== Head coaching record ==
=== NHL ===
Team	Year	Regular season						Postseason			
Team	Year	G	W	L	OTL	Pts	Finish	W	L	Win%	Result
CHI	2018–19	67	30	28	9	69	6th in Central	—	—	—	Missed playoffs
CHI	2019–20	70*	32	30	8	72	7th in Central	4	5	.444	Lost in First Round (VGK)
CHI	2020–21	56	24	25	7	55	6th in Central	—	—	—	Missed playoffs
CHI	2021–22	12	1	9	2	4	(fired)	—	—	—	—
Total		205	87	92	26			4	5	.444	1 playoff appearance

- Shortened season due to the COVID-19 pandemic during the 2019–20 season. Playoffs were played in August 2020 with a different format.

=== Other Leagues ===
Team	Year	Regular season						Postseason			
Team	Year	G	W	L	OTL	Pts	Finish	W	L	Win %	Result
Mora	2013–14	52	19	19	5	(80)	7th	1	4	.200	—
Mora	2014–15	52	22	20	7	79	7th	1	1	.500	Lost in SHL qualifiers
Mora	2015–16	52	20	20	6	78	6th	3	1	.750	Lost in SHL qualifiers
Mora	2016–17	52	31	13	4	105	1st	7	2	.778	Won promotion to the SHL
Rockford	2017–18	76	40	28	8	88	4th in Central	9	4	.692	Lost in Conference Finals
Abbotsford	2022–23	72	40	25	7	87	4th in Pacific	3	3	.500	Lost in Division Semifinals
Abbotsford	2023–24	72	40	25	7	87	5th in Pacific	2	4	.333	Lost in Division Semifinals
AHL total		220	120	78	22	262		14	11	.560	3 playoff appearances

Sporting positions
Preceded by Joel Quenneville	Head coach of the Chicago Blackhawks; 2018–2021	Succeeded by Derek King (interim)
