= 2016 Allan Cup =

Canadian senior ice hockey championship

The Allan Cup trophy

2016 Allan Cup logo

The 2016 Allan Cup was the Canadian championship of senior ice hockey and the 108th year the Allan Cup was awarded. The tournament was contended in Steinbach, Manitoba from April 11 to April 16, 2016, with all games played at the T.G. Smith Centre. The Bentley Generals defeated the host and defending champion South East Prairie Thunder in overtime to win the national title.

== Information ==
This year's Allan Cup marked the second time in eight seasons that the Allan Cup was played in Steinbach, with three of the participating teams from 2009 returning for 2016. The South East Prairie Thunder were formally announced as the host club in September 2014, the 2009 champion Bentley Generals qualified by winning Alberta's Chinook Hockey League, and the 2009 host team, Île-des-Chênes North Stars, qualified as Manitoba champions.

The other three clubs to qualify were the Stoney Creek Generals, who captured the OHA Allan Cup Hockey championship and Renwick Cup; the Shellbrook Elks, who qualified by default as the lone Senior 'AAA' club in Saskatchewan; and the Grand Falls-Windsor Cataracts, winner of the Atlantic region playoff.

== Participants ==
- South East Prairie Thunder (Host)

- 2012 and 2015 Allan Cup champions.
- Defeated Île-des-Chênes North Stars 2-0 to win Pattison Cup

- Bentley Generals (Pacific)

- 2009 and 2013 Allan Cup champions.
- 14-3-1 record, 1st in ChHL.
- Defeated Innisfail Eagles 4-3; Defeated Stony Plain Eagles 4-1 to win league
- Automatically advanced as British Columbia did not present a champion for McKenzie Cup.

- Île-des-Chênes North Stars (Manitoba)

- 2003 Allan Cup champions.
- Defeated Manitoba Lightning 2-1, lost to South East Prairie Thunder 0-2

- Shellbrook Elks (Saskatchewan)
- Stoney Creek Generals (Ontario)

- 18-4-2 record, 1st in ACH.
- Defeated Dundas Real McCoys 4-0, defeated Brantford Blast 4-1 to win league
- Automatically advanced as Northwestern Ontario did not present a champion for Renwick Cup.

- Grand Falls-Windsor Cataracts (Atlantic)
  - 14–6–1 record, 1st in the CWSHL
  - Defeated Gander Flyers 4–1, defeated Corner Brook Royals 4–1 to win league
  - Defeated St. John's Caps 3–0 to win Herder Memorial Trophy
  - Defeated Lameque Au P'tit Mousse 2–0 to win Atlantic Playdowns

== Map of teams ==
Host team Pacific participant Saskatchewan participant
Manitoba participant Ontario participant Atlantic participant

== Round robin ==
Allan Cup Round Robin
Division One
Rank	Team	Region	W-L-T	GF	GA
1	Grand Falls-Windsor Cataracts	Atlantic	2-0-0	7	5
2	South East Prairie Thunder	Host	1-1	6	4
3	Shellbrook Elks	Saskatchewan	0-2	2	6
Division Two
Rank	Team	Region	W-L-T	GF	GA
1	Bentley Generals	Pacific	2-0	12	5
2	Stoney Creek Generals	Ontario	0-2	5	16
3	Île-des-Chênes North Stars*	Manitoba	1-1	11	7

* Île-des-Chênes forfeited its win against Stoney Creek

=== Results ===
Round Robin results
Game	Away team	Score	Home team	Score	Notes
1	Île-des-Chênes	8	Stoney Creek	3	Final - IDC forfeits win
2	Shellbrook	0	South East	2	Final
3	Stoney Creek	2	Bentley	8	Final
4	South East	3	Grand Falls-Windsor	4	Final
5	Bentley	4	Île-des-Chênes	3	Final
6	Grand Falls-Windsor	3	Shellbrook	2	Final'

== Championship Round ==
=== Quarter and Semi-finals ===
Quarter and Semi-final results
Game	Away team	Score	Home team	Score	Notes
7	Stoney Creek	4	Shellbrook	7	Final
8	Île-des-Chênes	1	South East	3	Final
9	Shellbrook	1	Bentley	3	Final
10	South East	3	Grand-Falls Windsor	2	Final

=== Final ===
Allan Cup final: Game / Away team / Score / Home team / Score / Notes; 11 / South East / 3 / Bentley / 4 / OT Final
