= Terry Yake =

Canadian ice hockey player

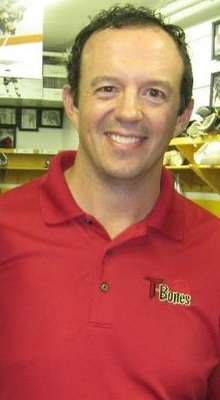
- Born: October 22, 1968 (age 57) New Westminster, British Columbia, Canada
- Height: 5 ft 11 in (180 cm)
- Weight: 185 lb (84 kg; 13 st 3 lb)
- Position: Centre
- Shot: Right
- Played for: Hartford Whalers; Mighty Ducks of Anaheim; Toronto Maple Leafs; St. Louis Blues; Washington Capitals; Essen Mosquitoes; Nürnberg Ice Tigers; Krefeld Pinguine
- NHL draft: 81st overall, 1987; Hartford Whalers
- Playing career: 1988–2009

Terry Donald Yake (born October 22, 1968) is a Canadian former professional ice hockey centre and right wing who played for the Hartford Whalers, Mighty Ducks of Anaheim, Toronto Maple Leafs, St. Louis Blues, and Washington Capitals.

== Playing career ==
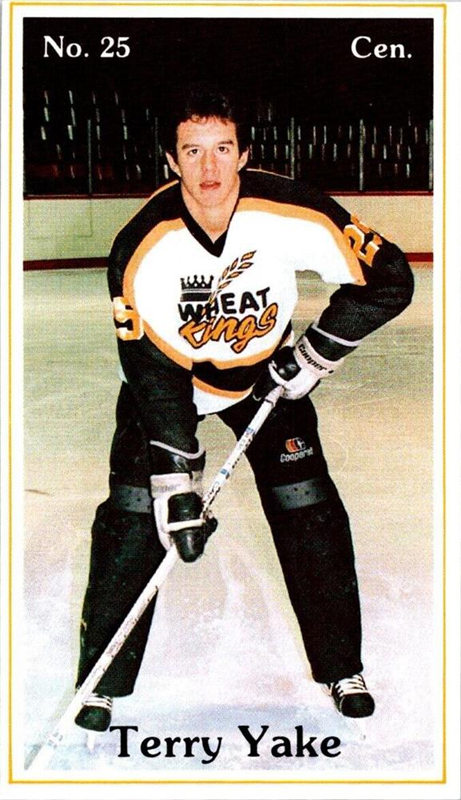
1985 card of Yake for Brandon Wheat Kings of the WHL

After three years with the Brandon Wheat Kings in the Western Hockey League, Yake was drafted by the Hartford Whalers in the 4th round, 81st overall in the 1987 NHL entry draft. Yake then returned to the Wheat Kings for one more season, scoring 140 points in 72 games.

The 1988–89 season saw Yake make his professional debut, appearing in 75 games with the Binghamton Whalers of the American Hockey League while also making his NHL debut with the Hartford Whalers, appearing in two games. The next three seasons saw Yake do much of the same; he played the majority of his time in the minors while playing sparingly with Whalers, most notably with the Springfield Indians, for whom Yake scored 77 points in 60 games in 1991 to help lead the Indians to their seventh and final Calder Cup championship.

The 1992–93 season was a breakout year for Yake. He appeared in 66 games with the Whalers and scored an NHL career high 53 points. The 1993–1994 season saw Yake enjoy another solid season. He was claimed by the newly formed Mighty Ducks of Anaheim and was the team's leading scorer for their inaugural season, scoring 52 points. He scored Anaheim's first hat trick in the team's first road game against the New York Rangers.

Despite leading the team in points, the Mighty Ducks traded Yake to the Toronto Maple Leafs in 1994. His tenure with the Maple Leafs was short lived, however. He appeared in only 19 games the whole year and would not see action in the NHL again until 1997. Yake signed with the Buffalo Sabres in 1996 and played the whole year with the Rochester Americans, scoring 101 points in 78 games.

This play allowed for Yake to sign with the St. Louis Blues in 1997. With the Blues he was able to regain a regular spot in the NHL again. He played 2 full years with the Blues, scoring 25 and 27 points respectively. The 1999–2000 season saw Yake play 26 games with the Blues before being traded to the Washington Capitals, where he appeared in another 35 games. For the 2000–2001 season Yake played in 12 games with the Capitals, playing the majority of the year with the Portland Pirates.

Starting in the 2001–02 season, Yake played three years in the DEL in Germany. Yake then moved to Switzerland's Nationalliga B, where he remained active through the 2009 season. He was named the player-coach of Lausanne HC of the NLB in 2008, but was fired in the fall of 2009 to end his professional career.

Yake continued to play amateur hockey through the 2015 season, appearing with Allan Cup-winning senior teams in 2012 and 2015.

== Personal ==
Yake currently lives in St. Louis with his wife and two daughters and runs a meat distribution business.

== Career statistics ==
			Regular season					Playoffs
Season	Team	League	GP	G	A	Pts	PIM	GP	G	A	Pts	PIM
1984–85	Brandon Wheat Kings	WHL	11	1	1	2	0	—	—	—	—	—
1985–86	Brandon Wheat Kings	WHL	72	26	26	52	49	—	—	—	—	—
1986–87	Brandon Wheat Kings	WHL	71	44	58	102	64	—	—	—	—	—
1987–88	Brandon Wheat Kings	WHL	72	55	85	140	59	3	4	2	6	7
1988–89	Binghamton Whalers	AHL	75	39	56	95	57	—	—	—	—	—
1988–89	Hartford Whalers	NHL	2	0	0	0	0	—	—	—	—	—
1989–90	Binghamton Whalers	AHL	77	13	42	55	37	—	—	—	—	—
1989–90	Hartford Whalers	NHL	2	0	1	1	0	—	—	—	—	—
1990–91	Springfield Indians	AHL	60	35	42	77	56	15	9	9	18	10
1990–91	Hartford Whalers	NHL	19	1	4	5	10	6	1	1	2	16
1991–92	Springfield Indians	AHL	53	21	34	55	63	8	3	4	7	2
1991–92	Hartford Whalers	NHL	15	1	1	2	4	—	—	—	—	—
1992–93	Springfield Indians	AHL	16	8	14	22	27	—	—	—	—	—
1992–93	Hartford Whalers	NHL	66	22	31	53	46	—	—	—	—	—
1993–94	Mighty Ducks of Anaheim	NHL	82	21	31	52	44	—	—	—	—	—
1994–95	Toronto Maple Leafs	NHL	19	3	2	5	2	—	—	—	—	—
1994–95	Denver Grizzlies	IHL	2	0	3	3	2	17	4	11	15	16
1995–96	Milwaukee Admirals	IHL	70	32	56	88	70	5	3	6	9	4
1996–97	Rochester Americans	AHL	78	34	67	101	77	10	8	8	16	2
1997–98	St. Louis Blues	NHL	65	10	15	25	38	10	2	1	3	6
1998–99	St. Louis Blues	NHL	60	9	18	27	34	13	1	2	3	14
1998–99	Worcester IceCats	AHL	24	8	11	19	26	—	—	—	—	—
1999–2000	St. Louis Blues	NHL	26	4	9	13	22	—	—	—	—	—
1999–2000	Washington Capitals	NHL	35	6	5	11	12	3	0	0	0	0
2000–01	Washington Capitals	NHL	12	0	3	3	8	—	—	—	—	—
2000–01	Portland Pirates	AHL	55	11	38	49	47	3	0	1	1	12
2001–02	Essen Mosquitoes	DEL	51	19	30	49	78	—	—	—	—	—
2002–03	Nürnberg Ice Tigers	DEL	50	14	32	46	111	5	0	3	3	4
2003–04	Krefeld Pinguine	DEL	52	7	22	29	70	—	—	—	—	—
2005–06	HC Martigny	SUI.2	11	8	10	18	8	—	—	—	—	—
2005–06	EHC Visp	SUI.2	9	4	13	17	4	7	6	4	10	10
2006–07	EHC Visp	SUI.2	45	26	53	79	40	16	9	13	22	28
2007–08	EHC Visp	SUI.2	23	12	20	32	30	—	—	—	—	—
2008–09	Lausanne HC	SUI.2	20	7	19	26	24	3	0	0	0	2
2010–11	Cartwright Clippers	THHL	4	2	10	12	0	—	—	—	—	—
2011–12	South East Prairie Thunder	AC	—	—	—	—	—	4	1	0	1	2
2012–13	South East Prairie Thunder	AC	—	—	—	—	—	4	1	2	3	4
AHL totals			438	169	304	473	390	36	20	22	42	26
NHL totals			403	77	120	197	220	32	4	4	8	36

== Awards and honours ==
Award	Year
AHL
Calder Cup (Springfield Indians)	1991
IHL
Turner Cup (Denver Grizzlies)	1995
DEL
All-Star Game	2002, 2003
