= Kevin Smyth =

Canadian ice hockey player

- Born: November 22, 1973 (age 52) Banff, Alberta, Canada
- Height: 6 ft 2 in (188 cm)
- Weight: 225 lb (102 kg; 16 st 1 lb)
- Position: Left wing
- Shot: Left
- Played for: Hartford Whalers
- NHL draft: 79th overall, 1992; Hartford Whalers
- Playing career: 1993–2002

Kevin Smyth (born November 22, 1973) is a Canadian former professional ice hockey player who played 58 games in the National Hockey League. He played with the Hartford Whalers. He spent parts of three seasons with the Hartford Whalers between 1993 and 1996, playing 58 games for them. Though his big league career was fairly short, he was an explosive scorer in junior and a solid two-way worker in the minors.

His younger brother is former longtime Edmonton Oilers forward Ryan Smyth.

== Playing career ==
Smyth was chosen 79th overall by the Whalers in 1992 after a 30-goal season with the WHL's Moose Jaw Warriors. He returned to junior and notched 44 goals before seeing action in 21 games as an NHL rookie in 1993-94. Smyth spent most of his first three pro seasons in the AHL but was recalled by Hartford periodically as an injury replacement. The hard-working forward joined the IHL's Orlando Solar Bears in 1996 and became a solid worker in the IHL. He (2013–14) plays for the Innisfail, Alberta Eagles of the Chinook Hockey League, after several seasons with the Bentley Generals.

== Visual impairment ==
On December 28, 1996, in a game against the Indianapolis Ice, Smyth took a puck to his eye after a point shot deflected off a stick and hit him in the right eye. The force of the puck was great enough to detach his retina and cause a ruptured globe, with enough force to blind him. Smyth later admitted that upon seeing the medical assessment, the force of the puck was strong enough to do significant damage to his eyeball. Smyth returned to active play on March 19, 1997, and recorded an assist in his first game back after the injury.

== Career statistics ==
=== Regular season and playoffs ===
			Regular season					Playoffs
Season	Team	League	GP	G	A	Pts	PIM	GP	G	A	Pts	PIM
1989–90	Caronport Cougars U18	SMAAAHL	18	20	37	57	15	—	—	—	—	—
1990–91	Moose Jaw Warriors	WHL	66	30	45	75	96	6	1	1	2	0
1991–92	Moose Jaw Warriors	WHL	71	30	55	85	84	4	1	3	4	6
1992–93	Moose Jaw Warrios	WHL	64	44	38	82	111	—	—	—	—	—
1993–94	Hartford Whalers	NHL	21	3	2	5	10	—	—	—	—	—
1993–94	Springfield Indians	AHL	42	22	27	49	72	6	4	5	9	0
1994–95	Hartford Whalers	NHL	16	1	5	6	13	—	—	—	—	—
1994–95	Springfield Falcons	AHL	57	12	22	39	72	—	—	—	—	—
1995–96	Hartford Whalers	NHL	21	2	1	3	8	—	—	—	—	—
1995–96	Springfield Falcons	AHL	47	15	33	48	87	10	5	5	10	8
1996–97	Orlando Solar Bears	IHL	38	14	17	31	49	10	1	2	3	6
1997–98	Orlando Solar Bears	IHL	43	10	5	15	59	1	0	0	0	2
1998–99	Las Vegas Thunder	IHL	1	0	0	0	0	—	—	—	—	—
1998–99	Tacoma Sabercats	WCHL	42	25	21	46	83	11	7	13	20	10
2001–02	Idaho Steelheads	WCHL	18	14	10	24	22	14	4	3	7	4
2002–03	Bentley Generals	ChHL	24	31	38	69	91	—	—	—	—	—
2003–04	Bentley Generals	ChHL	25	22	31	53	72	—	—	—	—	—
2004–05	Bentley Generals	ChHL	18	19	13	32	100	4	1	6	7	10
2006–07	Bentley Generals	ChHL	22	21	16	37	41	—	—	—	—	—
2007–08	Bentley Generals	ChHL	11	7	9	16	18	—	—	—	—	—
2008–09	Bentley Generals	ChHL	15	12	17	29	24	—	—	—	—	—
2009–10	Bentley Generals	ChHL	16	10	10	20	27	—	—	—	—	—
2010–11	Bentley Generals	ChHL	6	6	0	6	4	—	—	—	—	—
2012–13	Innisfail Eagles	ChHL	6	0	1	1	6	—	—	—	—	—
2013–14	Innisfail Eagles	ChHL	18	2	6	8	8	8	2	6	8	4
2014–15	Innisfail Eagles	ChHL	2	1	1	2	0	8	1	0	1	6
2017–18	Innisfail Eagles	ACHW	12	4	5	9	16	—	—	—	—	—
AHL totals			146	54	82	136	231	16	9	10	19	8
NHL totals			58	6	8	14	31	—	—	—	—	—
