= Johnathan Aitken =

Canadian ice hockey player (born 1978)

- Born: May 24, 1978 (age 48) Edmonton, Alberta, Canada
- Height: 6 ft 4 in (193 cm)
- Weight: 211 lb (96 kg; 15 st 1 lb)
- Position: Defence
- Shot: Left
- Played for: Boston Bruins; HC Sparta Praha; Chicago Blackhawks; EC KAC
- NHL draft: 8th overall, 1996; Boston Bruins
- Playing career: 1998–2007

Johnathan James Aitken (born May 24, 1978) is a Canadian former professional ice hockey defenceman who played in the National Hockey League (NHL) with the Boston Bruins and the Chicago Blackhawks.

== Playing career ==
Aitken was drafted 8th overall in the 1996 NHL entry draft by the Boston Bruins. He played in three games over the course of his two-year entry-level contract. For the 2000–01 season he went to the Czech Republic to play for HC Sparta Praha of the Czech Extraliga. He returned to North America after only a year, and made it back to the NHL during the 2003–04 season with the Chicago Blackhawks, playing 41 games, scoring just one assist. He moved to the Austrian Hockey League for Klagenfurt AC for the 2006–07 season before retiring from professional hockey.

== Career statistics ==
| | | | Regular season | | | | | Playoffs |
| Season | Team | League | GP | G | A | Pts | PIM | GP | G | A | Pts | PIM |
|---|---|---|---|---|---|---|---|---|---|---|---|---|
| 1993–94 | Sherwood Park Kings AAA | AMHL | 31 | 4 | 9 | 13 | 54 | — | — | — | — | — |
| 1994–95 | Medicine Hat Tigers | WHL | 53 | 0 | 5 | 5 | 71 | 5 | 0 | 0 | 0 | 0 |
| 1995–96 | Medicine Hat Tigers | WHL | 71 | 6 | 14 | 20 | 131 | 5 | 1 | 0 | 1 | 6 |
| 1996–97 | Brandon Wheat Kings | WHL | 65 | 4 | 18 | 22 | 211 | 6 | 0 | 0 | 0 | 4 |
| 1997–98 | Brandon Wheat Kings | WHL | 69 | 9 | 25 | 34 | 183 | 18 | 0 | 8 | 8 | 67 |
| 1998–99 | Providence Bruins | AHL | 65 | 2 | 9 | 11 | 92 | 13 | 0 | 0 | 0 | 17 |
| 1999–2000 | Boston Bruins | NHL | 3 | 0 | 0 | 0 | 0 | — | — | — | — | — |
| 1999–2000 | Providence Bruins | AHL | 70 | 2 | 12 | 14 | 121 | 11 | 1 | 0 | 1 | 26 |
| 2000–01 | HC Sparta Praha | ELH | 24 | 0 | 3 | 3 | 62 | — | — | — | — | — |
| 2001–02 | Jackson Bandits | ECHL | 43 | 1 | 9 | 10 | 141 | — | — | — | — | — |
| 2001–02 | Norfolk Admirals | AHL | 28 | 0 | 1 | 1 | 43 | 4 | 0 | 0 | 0 | 0 |
| 2002–03 | Norfolk Admirals | AHL | 80 | 1 | 7 | 8 | 207 | 9 | 2 | 1 | 3 | 18 |
| 2003–04 | Chicago Blackhawks | NHL | 41 | 0 | 1 | 1 | 70 | — | — | — | — | — |
| 2003–04 | Norfolk Admirals | AHL | 40 | 1 | 4 | 5 | 97 | 8 | 1 | 4 | 5 | 27 |
| 2004–05 | Manitoba Moose | AHL | 46 | 1 | 6 | 7 | 101 | 1 | 0 | 0 | 0 | 7 |
| 2005–06 | Hamilton Bulldogs | AHL | 47 | 1 | 2 | 3 | 81 | — | — | — | — | — |
| 2006–07 | Klagenfurt AC | EBEL | 34 | 2 | 11 | 13 | 157 | — | — | — | — | — |
| 2007–08 | Fort Saskatchewan Chiefs | ChHL | 5 | 0 | 1 | 1 | 17 | — | — | — | — | — |
| 2015–16 | Fort Saskatchewan Chiefs | ChHL | 12 | 0 | 3 | 3 | 26 | 3 | 0 | 0 | 0 | 6 |
| 2016–17 | Fort Saskatchewan Chiefs | ChHL | 14 | 2 | 6 | 8 | 14 | — | — | — | — | — |
| 2019–20 | Innisfail Eagles | ACHW | 7 | 1 | 4 | 5 | 8 | 1 | 0 | 0 | 0 | 0 |
| AHL totals | | | 376 | 8 | 41 | 49 | 742 | 45 | 4 | 5 | 9 | 97 |
| NHL totals | | | 44 | 0 | 1 | 1 | 70 | — | — | — | — | — |

== Awards and honours ==
| Award | Year |
|---|---|
WHL
| East Second All-Star Team | 1998 |
AHL
| Calder Cup (Providence Bruins) | 1999 |

Awards and achievements
| Preceded by Sean Brown | Boston Bruins first-round draft pick 1996 | Succeeded by Joe Thornton |
