= Evan Oberg =

Canadian ice hockey player

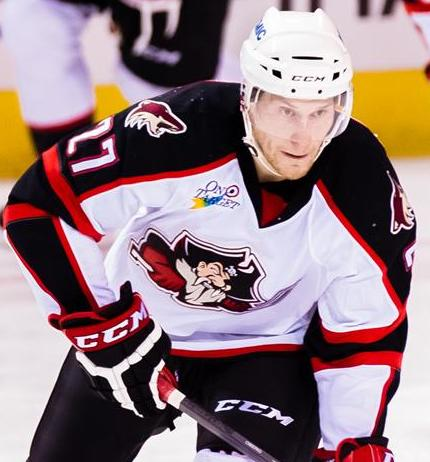
- Oberg with the Portland Pirates in 2014
- Born: February 16, 1988 (age 38) Forestburg, Alberta, Canada
- Height: 6 ft 0 in (183 cm)
- Weight: 191 lb (87 kg; 13 st 9 lb)
- Position: Defence
- Shot: Left
- ACHW team Former teams: Lacombe Generals; Vancouver Canucks; Tampa Bay Lightning; Augsburger Panther
- NHL draft: Undrafted
- Playing career: 2009–2019

Evan Oberg (born February 16, 1988) is a Canadian former professional ice hockey defenceman. He played 7 games in the National Hockey League (NHL) with the Vancouver Canucks and Tampa Bay Lightning between 2010 and 2012. The rest of his career, which lasted from 2009 to 2019, was mainly spent in the minor American Hockey League (AHL), though he also spent one season in the Deutsche Eishockey Liga. His last season was for the Lacombe Generals of the Allan Cup Hockey West (ACHW), a semi-professional league in Alberta, Canada.

== Playing career ==
Oberg played two seasons with the Camrose Kodiaks of the Alberta Junior Hockey League (AJHL) before joining the University of Minnesota-Duluth. After six games with the Bulldogs, Oberg was seriously injured during a team practice. Pushed into the boards feet first, he dislocated his fibula, fractured his tibia and tore his left ankle on his left leg. The injuries forced Oberg to miss eight weeks. Oberg finished the season with one goal, a game-winner, and two assists in twenty-four games. Oberg's second season with Minnesota-Duluth saw improvements, as he had seven goals and twenty assists in forty-three games.

After two seasons with Minnesota-Duluth, Oberg left the school when he signed a free-agent contract with the Vancouver Canucks of the National Hockey League (NHL) on April 10, 2009. He made his professional debut with the Canucks' American Hockey League (AHL) affiliate, the Manitoba Moose. After playing 33 games with the Moose, at which point he led all Moose defencemen in scoring, Oberg was recalled by the Canucks on January 8, 2010. He made his NHL and Canucks debut on January 9, 2010, against the Calgary Flames, and was sent back to the Moose the next day. He was recalled for the second time in the season on April 10, playing in the Canucks final game of the season against Calgary. Four days later he was sent back to the Moose, joining them for their playoff series against the Hamilton Bulldogs. He played all 70 games for the Moose in the 2009–10 AHL season, and led all team defencemen in scoring with 26 points.

In 2010–11, Oberg was recalled to the Canucks on February 17, 2011. On February 28, 2011, Oberg, along with a third round pick in the 2013 NHL entry draft, was traded to the Florida Panthers, for left winger Chris Higgins.

On December 2, 2011, Oberg was traded by the Panthers, along with Mike Kostka, to the Tampa Bay Lightning for James Wright and Mike Vernace. Oberg was recalled by the Lightning several times throughout the season, but would be sent back to the AHL without playing a game. He finally played his first game with the Lightning on January 24, 2012, against the Columbus Blue Jackets.

At the conclusion of his contract with the Lightning, Oberg was released as a free agent and signed a one-year AHL deal with the Chicago Wolves on August 19, 2013.

On July 31, 2014, Oberg signed as a free agent with his seventh AHL club, agreeing to a one-year contract with the Portland Pirates.

Oberg signed his first professional contract abroad on July 3, 2015, agreeing to a one-year deal with German club, Augsburger Panther of the DEL.

== Career statistics ==
=== Regular season and playoffs ===
			Regular season					Playoffs
Season	Team	League	GP	G	A	Pts	PIM	GP	G	A	Pts	PIM
2005–06	Camrose Kodiaks	AJHL	44	4	9	13	56	14	1	1	2	14
2006–07	Camrose Kodiaks	AJHL	52	9	14	23	86	16	3	11	14	24
2007–08	Minnesota-Duluth Bulldogs	WCHA	24	1	2	3	10	—	—	—	—	—
2008–09	Minnesota-Duluth Bulldogs	WCHA	43	7	20	27	50	—	—	—	—	—
2009–10	Manitoba Moose	AHL	70	3	23	26	64	5	1	1	2	4
2009–10	Vancouver Canucks	NHL	2	0	0	0	0	—	—	—	—	—
2010–11	Manitoba Moose	AHL	38	7	4	11	28	—	—	—	—	—
2010–11	Vancouver Canucks	NHL	2	0	0	0	0	—	—	—	—	—
2010–11	Rochester Americans	AHL	5	1	1	2	0	—	—	—	—	—
2011–12	San Antonio Rampage	AHL	12	0	2	2	14	—	—	—	—	—
2011–12	Norfolk Admirals	AHL	42	7	16	23	32	18	2	8	10	14
2011–12	Tampa Bay Lightning	NHL	3	0	0	0	0	—	—	—	—	—
2012–13	Syracuse Crunch	AHL	56	0	9	9	20	4	0	0	0	6
2013–14	Chicago Wolves	AHL	60	6	19	25	62	7	0	0	0	2
2014–15	Portland Pirates	AHL	48	7	11	18	47	—	—	—	—	—
2015–16	Augsburger Panther	DEL	46	2	11	13	102	—	—	—	—	—
2016–17	Lacombe Generals	ChHL	16	4	7	11	6	7	2	0	2	4
2017–18	Lacombe Generals	ACH	11	1	6	7	6	—	—	—	—	—
NHL totals			7	0	0	0	0	—	—	—	—	—
