= Ryan Tobler =

Canadian ice hockey player

- Born: May 13, 1976 (age 49) Calgary, Alberta, Canada
- Height: 6 ft 3 in (191 cm)
- Weight: 225 lb (102 kg; 16 st 1 lb)
- Position: Left wing
- Shot: Left
- Played for: Tampa Bay Lightning
- NHL draft: Undrafted
- Playing career: 1997–2010

Ryan Tobler (born May 13, 1976) is a Canadian former professional ice hockey winger who played four games in the National Hockey League (NHL) with the Tampa Bay Lightning during the 2001–02 season, going scoreless. He retired after the 2009-10 season after spending 7 years with the Colorado Eagles, with his number retired by the club on March 27, 2015. He currently serves as an assistant coach to the Colorado Eagles.

== Career statistics ==
			Regular season					Playoffs
Season	Team	League	GP	G	A	Pts	PIM	GP	G	A	Pts	PIM
1993–94	Calgary Royals	AJHL	56	32	17	49	195	—	—	—	—	—
1994–95	Saskatoon Blades	WHL	61	11	19	30	81	10	1	2	3	8
1995–96	Calgary Hitmen	WHL	16	10	3	13	8	—	—	—	—	—
1995–96	Swift Current Broncos	WHL	25	17	11	28	31	6	1	1	2	2
1996–97	Swift Current Broncos	WHL	39	10	17	27	40	—	—	—	—	—
1996–97	Moose Jaw Warriors	WHL	24	6	15	21	16	12	1	6	7	16
1997–98	Utah Grizzlies	IHL	3	1	0	1	2	—	—	—	—	—
1997–98	Lake Charles Ice Pirates	WPHL	66	22	34	56	204	4	2	3	5	18
1998–99	Adirondack Red Wings	AHL	64	9	18	27	157	3	0	0	0	2
1999–00	Milwaukee Admirals	IHL	78	19	28	47	293	2	0	0	0	0
2000–01	Milwaukee Admirals	IHL	49	7	9	16	196	—	—	—	—	—
2000–01	Hartford Wolf Pack	AHL	13	1	5	6	71	5	0	0	0	2
2001–02	Tampa Bay Lightning	NHL	4	0	0	0	5	—	—	—	—	—
2001–02	Springfield Falcons	AHL	73	17	24	41	215	—	—	—	—	—
2002–03	Springfield Falcons	AHL	11	0	2	2	44	—	—	—	—	—
2002–03	Chicago Wolves	AHL	58	13	18	31	143	2	0	0	0	0
2003–04	Colorado Eagles	CHL	51	30	49	79	93	—	—	—	—	—
2003-04	Wilkes-Barre/Scranton Penguins	AHL	12	0	1	1	34	9	0	1	1	2
2004–05	Colorado Eagles	CHL	51	26	37	63	119	16	6	11	17	37
2005–06	Colorado Eagles	CHL	59	25	35	60	169	12	6	4	10	37
2006–07	Colorado Eagles	CHL	62	27	41	68	244	25	9	10	19	42
2007–08	Colorado Eagles	CHL	21	10	10	20	47	16	5	6	11	55
2008–09	Colorado Eagles	CHL	64	38	28	66	146	9	4	3	7	12
2009–10	Colorado Eagles	CHL	59	26	34	60	122	4	1	3	4	8
2011–12	Bentley Generals	ChHL	8	1	0	1	25	—	—	—	—	—
CHL totals			367	182	234	416	940	82	31	37	68	191
AHL totals			231	40	68	108	664	19	0	1	1	6
NHL totals			4	0	0	0	5	—	—	—	—	—
