= 2014 Allan Cup =

Canadian senior ice hockey championship

The Allan Cup trophy

The 2014 Allan Cup was the Canadian championship of senior ice hockey. This was the 106th year the Allan Cup was awarded. The tournament was contended in Dundas, Ontario from April 14 to April 19, 2014 and hosted by the Dundas Real McCoys of the Ontario Hockey Federation.

The Real McCoys went a perfect 4–0 in the tournament and defeated the Clarenville Caribous 3–2 in overtime in the championship game to win their first Allan Cup.

== Participants ==
- Dundas Real McCoys (Host)

- 18-4-2 record, 1st in ACH.
- Defeated Stoney Creek Generals 4-0, Lost to Brantford Blast 2-4.

- Bentley Generals (Pacific)

- 21-3-0 record, 1st in ChHL.
- Defeated Stony Plain Eagles 4-0, Defeated Innisfail Eagles 4-0, Defeated Powell River Regals 3-0.

- South East Prairie Thunder (West)

- Defeated Shellbrook Elks 3-0.

- Kenora Thistles (HNO)

- Automatically qualified as there is no Quebec teams.
- 5-0-0 exhibition record.

- Brantford Blast (OHF)

- 16-7-1 record, 3rd in ACH.
- Defeated Whitby Dunlops 4-2, Defeated Dundas Real McCoys 4-2.

- Clarenville Caribous (Atlantic)

- Conception Bay North Cee Bee Stars decline, Caribous 2012 NLSHL Runner-up.
- 13-6-5 record, 2nd in NLSHL.
- Defeated Mount Pearl Blades 4-1, Lost to Grand Falls-Windsor Cataracts 2-4.

== Map of teams ==
Host team Pacific participant West participant
Northern Ontario participant Ontario participant Atlantic participant

== Round robin ==
Allan Cup Round Robin
Division One
Rank	Team	Region	W-L-T	GF	GA
1	Clarenville Caribous	Atlantic	2-0-0	11	4
2	Brantford Blast	OHF	1-1-0	7	10
3	Kenora Thistles	HNO	0-2-0	6	10
Division Two
Rank	Team	Region	W-L-T	GF	GA
1	Dundas Real McCoys	Host	2-0-0	10	5
2	South East Prairie Thunder	West	1-1-0	6	5
3	Bentley Generals	Pacific	0-2-0	3	9

=== Results ===
Round Robin results
Game	Home team	Score	Away team	Score	Notes
1	Brantford	5	Kenora	4	Final - Shots: 28-25 KEN
2	Dundas	4	South East	3	Final - Shots: 36-29 DUN
3	Kenora	2	Clarenville	5	Final - Shots: 29-24 KEN
4	Bentley	2	Dundas	6	Final - Shots: 31-29 DUN
5	Clarenville	6	Brantford	2	Final - Shots: 35-31 CLA
6	South East	3	Bentley	1	Final - Shots: 37-29 BEN

== Championship Round ==
=== Quarter and Semi-finals ===
Quarter and Semi-final results
Game	Home team	Score	Away team	Score	Notes
QF	Brantford	2	Bentley	3	Final - Shots: 33-20 BEN
QF	South East	2	Kenora	3	Final - Shots: 27-26 SPT
SF	Clarenville	5	Bentley	1	Final - Shots: 35-27 BEN
SF	Dundas	4	Kenora	0	Final - Shots: 29-28 DUN

=== Final ===
Allan Cup final: Game / Home team / Score / Away team / Score / Notes; F / Dundas / 3 / Clarenville / 2 / 2OT Final - Shots: 53-41 CLA

== Awards ==
Bill Saunders Award (Tournament MVP): Mike Mole (Dundas Real McCoys)

All Star Team

Goalie: Mike Mole (Dundas Real McCoys)
Defense: Luke Gallant (Clarenville Caribous)
Defense: Simon Mangos (Dundas Real McCoys)
Forward: Ryan Christie (Dundas Real McCoys)
Forward: Cam Fraser (Clarenville Caribous)
Forward: Matt Quinn (Clarenville Caribous)
