= Brad Purdie =

Canadian ice hockey player

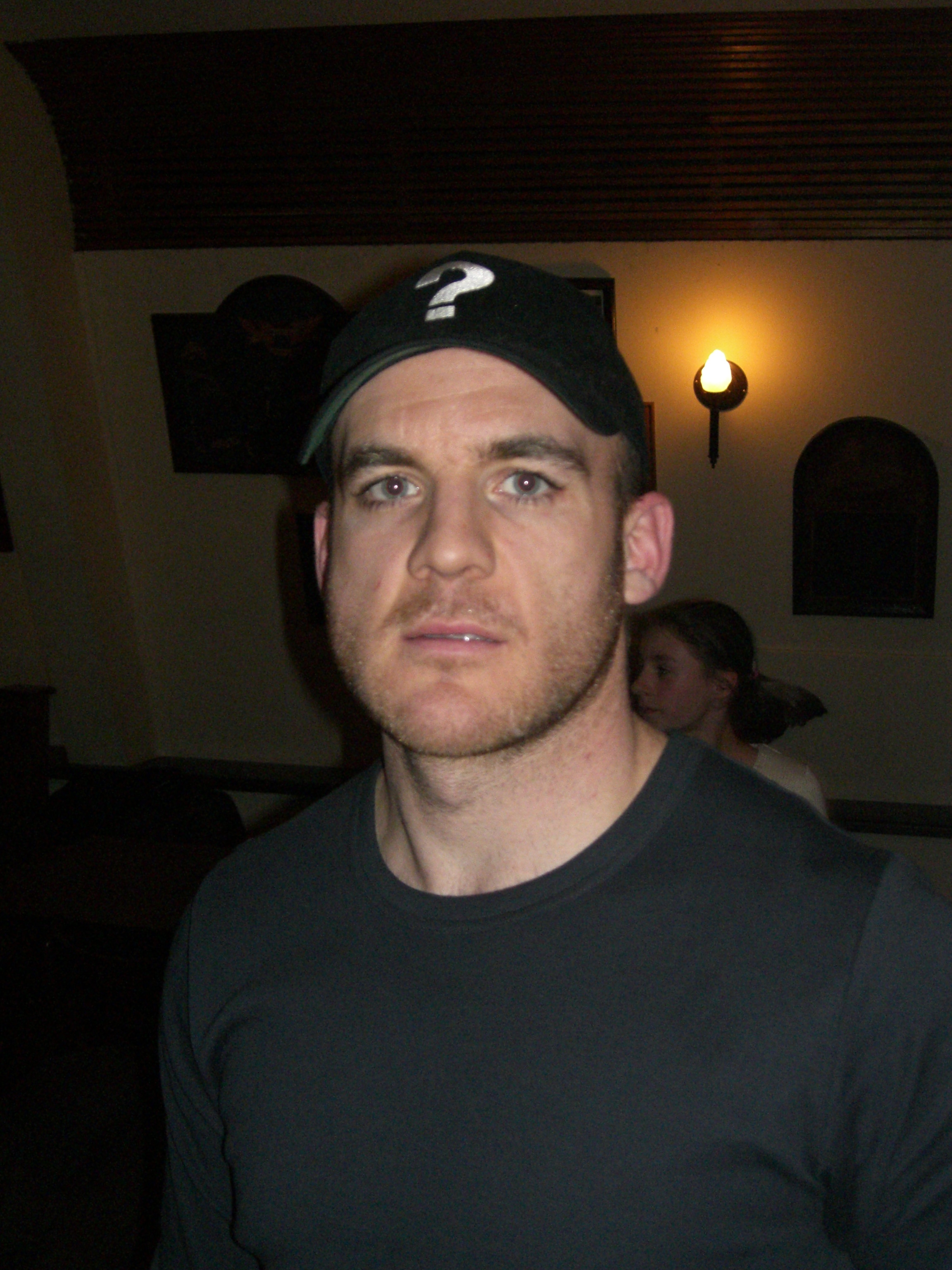
- Born: September 11, 1972 (age 52); Dollard-des-Ormeaux, Quebec, Canada
- Height: 6 ft 0 in (183 cm)
- Weight: 195 lb (88 kg; 13 st 13 lb)
- Position: Centre
- Shot: Left
- EBEL team: EHC Black Wings Linz
- NHL draft: Undrafted
- Playing career: 1996–2011

Brad Purdie (born July 11, 1972) is a Canadian retired professional ice hockey centre.

== Early life ==
Born in Dollard-des-Ormeaux, Quebec, Purdie spent four seasons with the Maine Black Bears men's ice hockey team.

== Career ==
Purdie began his professional career in the East Coast Hockey League with the Dayton Bombers and the Peoria Rivermen, and in the American Hockey League with the Cornwall Aces before spending three seasons in the International Hockey League. He played for the Chicago Wolves before joining the Manitoba Moose, finishing second in points with 72 behind Greg Pankewicz's 76. He then moved to the Fort Wayne Komets, where he scored 68 points and again finished second in points with Vyacheslav Butsayev leading the team with 72.

In 1999, Purdie moved to Austria and joined EC VSV, where he led the team with 32 goals and 50 assists for 82 points in 33 games. He then moved to the Deutsche Eishockey Liga in Germany, joining the Krefeld Pinguine, where he led the team in points in each of his three seasons. He had the highest number of assists while playing for Krefeld Pinguine of the German DEL. He moved to the Hamburg Freezers in 2003, where he was the top points scorer in his first season with 52 points in 52 games. The following season, he scored 33 points. In 2005, he moved to the Iserlohn Roosters but struggled with injuries and failed to make the playoffs twice.

In 2007, Purdie returned to Austria and joined Steinbach Black Wings Linz of the Austrian Hockey League, where he scored 16 goals and 37 assists for 53 points.

Since retiring from playing professional hockey in 2011, Purdie played for and now coaches the South East Prairie Thunder, a Senior 'AAA' team in Manitoba, and volunteers with the Manitoba Bisons.

== Career statistics ==
| | | | Regular season | | | | | Playoffs |
| Season | Team | League | GP | G | A | Pts | PIM | GP | G | A | Pts | PIM |
|---|---|---|---|---|---|---|---|---|---|---|---|---|
| 1990–91 | Weyburn Red Wings | SJHL | 45 | 20 | 20 | 40 | 22 | — | — | — | — | — |
| 1991–92 | Weyburn Red Wings | SJHL | 47 | 27 | 35 | 62 | 42 | — | — | — | — | — |
| 1992–93 | University of Maine | HE | 20 | 3 | 7 | 10 | 14 | — | — | — | — | — |
| 1993–94 | University of Maine | HE | 36 | 6 | 8 | 14 | 20 | — | — | — | — | — |
| 1994–95 | University of Maine | HE | 44 | 29 | 19 | 48 | 28 | — | — | — | — | — |
| 1995–96 | University of Maine | HE | 39 | 17 | 20 | 37 | 36 | — | — | — | — | — |
| 1995–96 | Dayton Bombers | ECHL | 3 | 1 | 1 | 2 | 0 | — | — | — | — | — |
| 1995–96 | Cornwall Aces | AHL | 1 | 0 | 0 | 0 | 0 | — | — | — | — | — |
| 1996–97 | Chicago Wolves | IHL | 61 | 14 | 22 | 36 | 28 | 4 | 0 | 1 | 1 | 4 |
| 1996–97 | Peoria Rivermen | ECHL | 11 | 9 | 4 | 13 | 10 | — | — | — | — | — |
| 1997–98 | Manitoba Moose | IHL | 81 | 29 | 43 | 72 | 73 | 3 | 0 | 0 | 0 | 0 |
| 1998–99 | Fort Wayne Komets | IHL | 80 | 27 | 41 | 68 | 45 | 2 | 0 | 2 | 2 | 0 |
| 1999–2000 | EC VSV | IEHL | 33 | 32 | 50 | 82 | 24 | — | — | — | — | — |
| 1999–2000 | EC VSV | AUT | 14 | 7 | 18 | 25 | 10 | — | — | — | — | — |
| 2000–01 | Krefeld Pinguine | DEL | 58 | 25 | 39 | 64 | 72 | — | — | — | — | — |
| 2001–02 | Krefeld Pinguine | DEL | 60 | 32 | 43 | 75 | 54 | 3 | 0 | 1 | 1 | 6 |
| 2002–03 | Krefeld Pinguine | DEL | 52 | 11 | 41 | 52 | 42 | 14 | 12 | 11 | 23 | 18 |
| 2003–04 | Hamburg Freezers | DEL | 52 | 19 | 33 | 52 | 52 | 11 | 4 | 8 | 12 | 10 |
| 2004–05 | Hamburg Freezers | DEL | 52 | 14 | 19 | 33 | 50 | 6 | 0 | 1 | 1 | 4 |
| 2005–06 | Iserlohn Roosters | DEL | 39 | 9 | 24 | 33 | 60 | — | — | — | — | — |
| 2006–07 | Iserlohn Roosters | DEL | 41 | 19 | 18 | 37 | 94 | — | — | — | — | — |
| 2007–08 | EHC Liwest Black Wings Linz | AUT | 46 | 16 | 37 | 53 | 68 | 11 | 0 | 8 | 8 | 16 |
| 2008–09 | EHC Liwest Black Wings Linz | AUT | 52 | 21 | 42 | 63 | 82 | 10 | 3 | 7 | 10 | 26 |
| 2009–10 | EHC Liwest Black Wings Linz | AUT | 51 | 23 | 33 | 56 | 74 | 18 | 11 | 11 | 22 | 32 |
| 2010–11 | EHC Liwest Black Wings Linz | AUT | 47 | 18 | 22 | 40 | 57 | 5 | 2 | 0 | 2 | 8 |
| 2011–12 | South East Prairie Thunder | AC | — | — | — | — | — | 4 | 2 | 6 | 8 | 0 |
| IHL totals | | | 222 | 70 | 106 | 176 | 146 | 9 | 0 | 3 | 3 | 4 |
| AUT totals | | | 212 | 85 | 152 | 237 | 291 | 44 | 16 | 26 | 42 | 82 |
| DEL totals | | | 354 | 129 | 217 | 346 | 424 | 34 | 16 | 21 | 37 | 38 |
