= Travis Brigley =

Canadian ice hockey player

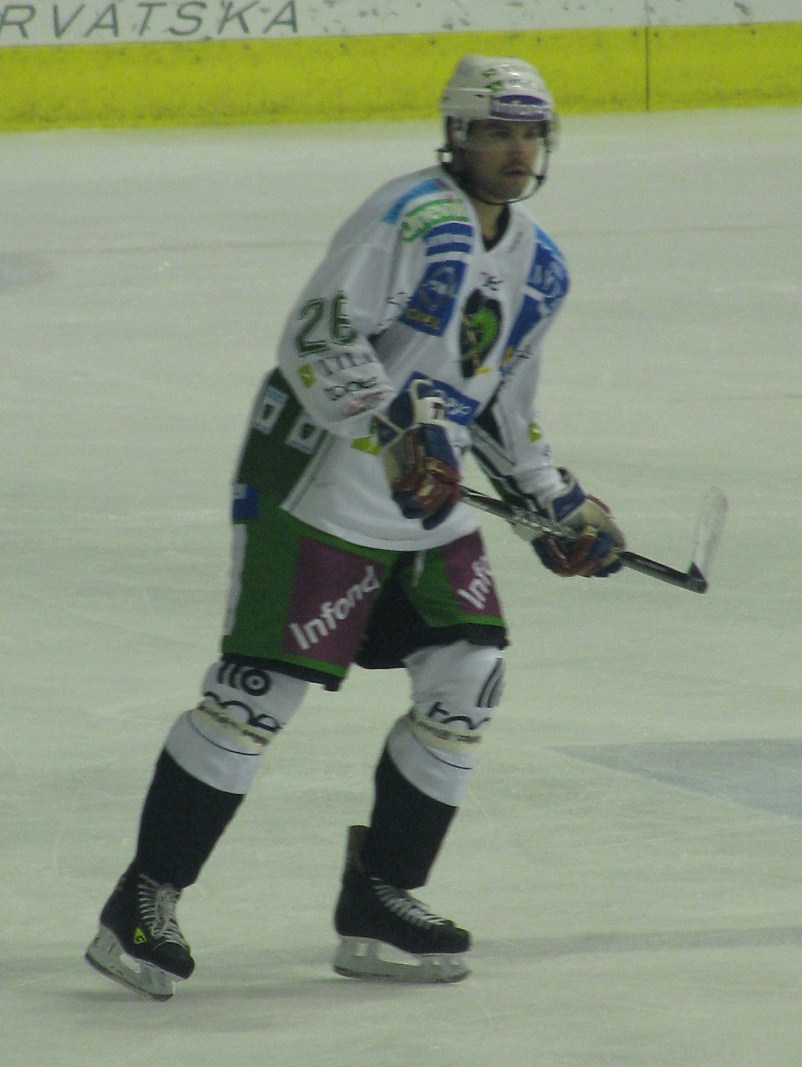
- Born: June 16, 1977 (age 49) Coronation, Alberta, Canada
- Height: 6 ft 1 in (185 cm)
- Weight: 200 lb (91 kg; 14 st 4 lb)
- Position: Left wing
- Shot: Left
- Played for: Calgary Flames; Colorado Avalanche; Vålerenga; Augsburger Panther; Hamburg Freezers; HDD Olimpija Ljubljana; Cardiff Devils
- NHL draft: 39th overall, 1996; Calgary Flames
- Playing career: 1997–2013

Travis Brigley (born June 16, 1977) is a Canadian former professional ice hockey player. He has formerly played professionally for the Calgary Flames and Colorado Avalanche in the National Hockey League (NHL).

== Playing career ==
Brigley was drafted 39th overall, by the Calgary Flames in the 1996 NHL entry draft after playing four years with Lethbridge Hurricanes of the WHL. Brigley made his professional debut in the 1997–98 season with the Saint John Flames of the AHL. He also made his NHL debut with Calgary in the same year playing in 2 games.

In the 1999–2000 season, Brigley was traded by the Flames to the Philadelphia Flyers for Marc Bureau on March 6, 2000. In the 2000–01 season, Brigley briefly played in Wales, UK with the Cardiff Devils before signing as a free agent with the Florida Panthers on December 16, 2000.

Brigley played for the Panthers affiliate, the Louisville Panthers of the AHL before signing as a free agent with the Cincinnati Mighty Ducks for the 2001–02 season. Following impressive play for Cincinnati, Travis was signed by parent club the Mighty Ducks of Anaheim on January 22, 2002.

On August 12, 2003, Brigley was traded by the Ducks to the Colorado Avalanche. He made his long-awaited return to the NHL, playing in a career-high 36 games for the Avalanche in 2003–04. During the NHL lockout, Brigley signed in Norway, he won the Norgesmester for Vålerenga.

Brigley returned to North America for the 2005–06 season when he signed with the New York Islanders on September 2, 2005. Brigley never played with the Islanders, spending the season in the AHL with the Bridgeport Sound Tigers and the Springfield Falcons. Brigley returned to Europe the following season signing with German team Augsburger Panther of the DEL. After two seasons of missing the playoffs with the Panthers, Brigley signed with the Hamburg Freezers for the 2008–09 season.

On October 12, 2009, Brigley signed with Slovenian team HDD Olimpija Ljubljana of the Erste Bank Eishockey Liga. After playing in only 22 games Brigley left the team on December 23, 2009. In finishing the season, Travis returned to Canada and played in a brief stint with the Bentley Generals in the senior AAA Alberta based, Chinook Hockey League.

== Career statistics ==
			Regular season					Playoffs
Season	Team	League	GP	G	A	Pts	PIM	GP	G	A	Pts	PIM
1993–94	Lethbridge Hurricanes	WHL	1	0	0	0	0	—	—	—	—	—
1994–95	Lethbridge Hurricanes	WHL	64	14	18	32	24	—	—	—	—	—
1995–96	Lethbridge Hurricanes	WHL	69	34	43	77	94	4	2	3	5	8
1996–97	Lethbridge Hurricanes	WHL	71	43	47	90	56	19	9	9	18	31
1997–98	Saint John Flames	AHL	79	17	15	32	28	8	0	0	0	0
1997–98	Calgary Flames	NHL	2	0	0	0	2	—	—	—	—	—
1998–99	Saint John Flames	AHL	74	15	35	50	48	7	3	1	4	2
1999–00	Detroit Vipers	IHL	29	6	10	16	24	—	—	—	—	—
1999–00	Saint John Flames	AHL	9	3	1	4	4	—	—	—	—	—
1999–00	Calgary Flames	NHL	17	0	2	2	4	—	—	—	—	—
1999–00	Philadelphia Phantoms	AHL	15	2	2	4	15	5	1	0	1	4
2000–01	Cardiff Devils	BISL	12	5	9	14	6	—	—	—	—	—
2000–01	Knoxville Speed	UHL	4	2	4	6	4	—	—	—	—	—
2000–01	Louisville Panthers	AHL	49	14	21	35	34	—	—	—	—	—
2001–02	Macon Whoopee	ECHL	8	4	3	7	2	—	—	—	—	—
2001–02	Cincinnati Mighty Ducks	AHL	70	22	21	43	40	3	2	0	2	0
2002–03	Cincinnati Mighty Ducks	AHL	64	18	27	45	58	—	—	—	—	—
2002–03	Hershey Bears	AHL	13	3	5	8	4	5	1	2	3	2
2003–04	Hershey Bears	AHL	18	6	6	12	8	—	—	—	—	—
2003–04	Colorado Avalanche	NHL	36	3	4	7	10	—	—	—	—	—
2004–05	Vålerenga	GET	21	8	11	19	43	10	3	4	7	18
2005–06	Bridgeport Sound Tigers	AHL	39	7	10	17	28	—	—	—	—	—
2005–06	Springfield Falcons	AHL	18	3	3	6	6	—	—	—	—	—
2006–07	Augsburger Panther	DEL	48	13	29	42	121	—	—	—	—	—
2007–08	Augsburger Panther	DEL	55	22	25	47	74	—	—	—	—	—
2008–09	Hamburg Freezers	DEL	50	16	15	31	54	9	0	2	2	6
2009–10	HDD Olimpija Ljubljana	EBEL	22	14	11	25	8	—	—	—	—	—
2009–10	Bentley Generals	ChHL	5	1	4	5	0	6	1	3	4	2
2010–11	Bentley Generals	ChHL	18	16	21	37	20	—	—	—	—	—
2011–12	Bentley Generals	ChHL	21	2	3	5	14	—	—	—	—	—
2012–13	Bentley Generals	ChHL	11	9	2	11	4	3	1	0	1	2
NHL totals			55	3	6	9	16	—	—	—	—	—
