= 2015 Allan Cup =

Canadian senior ice hockey championship

2015 Allan Cup logo

The Allan Cup trophy

The 2015 Allan Cup was the Canadian championship of senior ice hockey and the 107th year the Allan Cup was awarded. The tournament was contended in Clarenville, Newfoundland and Labrador from April 13 to April 18, 2015 and hosted by the Clarenville Caribous. All games were played at the Eastlink Events Centre.

The championship game between the Bentley Generals and South East Prairie Thunder was a rematch of the 2009 final. The Prairie Thunder defeated the Generals by a score of 2–0 to win their second national title.

== Information ==
This year's Allan Cup was the first played in Newfoundland and Labrador since 1985. It was the third consecutive trip to the Allan Cup for the host Clarenville Caribous, who lost the previous two championship games.

The Atlantic region was awarded Quebec's berth for this year's Allan Cup, in addition to its regular spot. As a result, the champions from the Newfoundland's Central West Senior Hockey League (Grand Falls-Windsor Cataracts) and New Brunswick's North East Senior Hockey League (Lameque Au P'tit Mousse) were given automatic berths into the Allan Cup. In Ontario, the OHF and defending Allan Cup champions Dundas Real McCoys defeated Northern Ontario's Kenora Thistles to win the Renwick Cup.

In the West, the South East Prairie Thunder of Manitoba swept the Rathgaber Cup series against Saskatchewan's Rosetown Red Wings to return to the Allan Cup for the sixth time in seven years. British Columbia did not present a team for the McKenzie Cup series, thus allowing Alberta's Chinook Hockey League champion (Bentley Generals) to take the Pacific region uncontested and advance directly to the Allan Cup.

== Participants ==
- Clarenville Caribous (Host)

- 13-10-1 record, 3rd in NLSWHL.
- Lost to Grand Falls-Windsor Cataracts 0-4.

- Bentley Generals (Pacific)

- 2009 and 2013 Allan Cup champions.
- 23-1-0 record, 1st in ChHL.
- Defeated Fort Saskatchewan Chiefs 4-1, Defeated Innisfail Eagles 4-0 to win league.
- Automatically qualified as Powell River Regals (BC) declined.

- South East Prairie Thunder (West)

- 2012 Allan Cup champions.
- Defeated Rosetown Red Wings 3-0 to win region.

- Dundas Real McCoys (Ontario)

- Defending Allan Cup champions.
- 10-13-1 record, 4th in ACH.
- Defeated Brantford Blast 4-2, Defeated Whitby Dunlops 4-2 to win league.
- Defeated Kenora Thistles 2-0 to win region.

- Lameque Au P'tit Mousse (New Brunswick)

- 10-7-3 record, 3rd in NESHL.
- Defeated Restigouche Nord Vikings 4-1, Lost to Tracadie Alpines 1-4.
- NESHL champion automatically qualified as there are no Quebec teams.
- Tracadie Alpines declined, Lameque 2015 NESHL runner-up.

- Grand Falls-Windsor Cataracts (Newfoundland & Labrador)

- 13-10-1 record, 2nd in NLSWHL.
- Defeated Clarenville Caribous 4-0, Defeated Corner Brook Royals 4-0 to win league.

== Map of teams ==
Host team Pacific participant West participant
Ontario participant New Brunswick participant Newfoundland participant

== Round robin ==
Allan Cup Round Robin
Division One
Rank	Team	Region	W-L-T	GF	GA
1	South East Prairie Thunder	West	2-0-0	6	4
2	Grand Falls-Windsor Cataracts	Newfoundland & Labrador	1-1-0	6	5
3	Dundas Real McCoys	Ontario	0-2-0	6	9
Division Two
Rank	Team	Region	W-L-T	GF	GA
1	Bentley Generals	Pacific	2-0-0	7	3
2	Clarenville Caribous	Host	1-1-0	7	4
3	Lameque Au P'tit Mousse	New Brunswick	0-2-0	2	9

=== Results ===
Round Robin results
Game	Away team	Score	Home team	Score	Notes
1	Dundas	3	Grand Falls-Windsor	5	Final - Shots: 66-22 GFW
2	Lameque	1	Clarenville	5	Final - Shots: 44-22 CLA
3	South East	4	Dundas	2	Final - Shots: 56-32 SE
4	Clarenville	2	Bentley	3	Final - Shots: 37-35 BEN
5	Grand Falls-Windsor	1	South East	2	Final - Shots: 32-31 GFW
6	Bentley	4	Lameque	1	Final - Shots: 38-18 BEN

== Championship Round ==
=== Quarter and Semi-finals ===
Quarter and Semi-final results
Game	Away team	Score	Home team	Score	Notes
QF	Lameque	2	Grand Falls-Windsor	4	Final - Shots: 49-23 GFW
QF	Dundas	1	Clarenville	2	Final - Shots: 46-24 CLA
SF	Grand Falls-Windsor	5	Bentley	6	OT Final - Shots: 37-33 BEN
SF	Clarenville	1	South East	4	Final - Shots: 44-25 CLA

=== Final ===
Allan Cup final: Game / Away team / Score / Home team / Score / Notes; F / South East / 2 / Bentley / 0 / Final - Shots: 27-25 BEN

== Awards ==
Bill Saunders Award (Tournament MVP): Steve Christie (South East Prairie Thunder)
All Star Team

Goalie: Steve Christie (South East Prairie Thunder)
Defense: Ryan Bonni (South East Prairie Thunder)
Defense: Griffen Nyren (Bentley Generals)
Forward: Colin Circelli (Grand Falls-Windsor Cataracts)
Forward: Del Cowan (South East Prairie Thunder)
Forward: Cam MacLise (Bentley Generals)
