= 1999 Allan Cup =

Canadian senior ice hockey championship

The Allan Cup trophy

The 1999 Allan Cup was the Canadian senior ice hockey championship for the 1998–99 senior "AAA" season. The event was hosted by the Stony Plain Eagles in Stony Plain, Alberta. The 1999 tournament marked the 91st time that the Allan Cup has been awarded.

== Teams ==
- Lloydminster Border Kings (West)
- London MacMaster Chevys (East)
- Powell River Regals (Pacific)
- Stony Plain Eagles (Host)

== Results ==
Round Robin

Powell River Regals 7 - Lloydminster Border Kings 1
Stony Plain Eagles 8 - London MacMaster Chevys 3
Powell River Regals 8 - London MacMaster Chevys 1
Lloydminster Border Kings 3 - Stony Plain Eagles 3
Lloydminster Border Kings 4 - London MacMaster Chevys 3
Stony Plain Eagles 5 - Powell River Regals 3

Semi-final

Powell River Regals 5 - Lloydminster Border Kings 3

Final

Stony Plain Eagles 6 - Powell River Regals 3
