= 2007 Allan Cup =

Canadian senior ice hockey championship

The Allan Cup trophy

The 2007 Allan Cup was the Canadian senior ice hockey championship for the 2006–07 senior "AAA" season. The event was hosted by the Stony Plain Eagles in Stony Plain, Alberta. The 2007 tournament marked the 99th year that the Allan Cup has been awarded.

== Teams ==
- Bentley Generals (Pacific)
- Halifax Molson Canadians (Atlantic)
- Lloydminster Border Kings (West)
- Shawinigan Xtreme (Quebec)
- Stony Plain Eagles (Host)
- Whitby Dunlops (Ontario)

== Results ==
Round Robin

Bentley Generals 4 - Lloydminster Border Kings 1
Whitby Dunlops 3 - Stony Plain Eagles 3
Bentley Generals 5 - Halifax Molson Canadians 3
Whitby Dunlops 6 - Shawinigan Xtreme 5
Lloydminster Border Kings 5 - Halifax Molson Canadians 4
Stony Plain Eagles 4 - Shawinigan Xtreme 3 (OT)

Quarter-final

Whitby Dunlops 9 - Halifax Molson Canadians 5
Lloydminster Border Kings 5 - Shawinigan Xtreme 1

Semi-final

Whitby Dunlops 3 - Bentley Generals 2 (OT)
Lloydminster Border Kings 5 - Stony Plain Eagles 4

Final

Lloydminster Border Kings 4 - Whitby Dunlops 3
