= South East Prairie Thunder =

- City: Winnipeg, Manitoba
- Division: Senior AAA
- Founded: 2004
- Folded: 2020
- Colours: Blue, Green, White

Franchise history
- 2004 - 2006: Grunthal Red Wings
- 2006 - 2020: South East Prairie Thunder

Championships
- Playoff championships: 2012 Allan Cup; 2015 Allan Cup

The South East Prairie Thunder were a Canadian Senior 'AAA' ice hockey team based out of Winnipeg, Manitoba and two-time Allan Cup champions. They played an independent schedule under the jurisdiction of Hockey Manitoba. The team is inactive as of 2021.

== History ==
The team was founded in 2004 as the Grunthal Red Wings and based out of Grunthal, Manitoba. The Red Wings became the Southeast Prairie Thunder, relocating to Steinbach in 2006 and playing out of the T.G. Smith Centre from 2006 to 2017. Since then, the team has played its home games at the Seven Oaks and Wayne Fleming Arenas in Winnipeg.

The team have made nine appearances at the Allan Cup, Canada's national senior 'AAA' championship. Their first was at the 2009 Allan Cup, which was played in Steinbach, but hosted by their local rivals, the Steinbach North Stars. The Prairie Thunder advanced to the final, but lost 4-3 in double overtime to the Bentley Generals.

Three years later, the Thunder captured their first national title at the 2012 Allan Cup in Lloydminster, Saskatchewan. They claimed their second national title at the 2015 Allan Cup in Clarenville, Newfoundland and Labrador, defeating Bentley in the final by a score of 2-0.

The Prairie Thunder also participated in the 2010, 2011, 2014, 2017, 2018, and 2019 Allan Cups. The Prairie Thunder hosted the 2016 Allan Cup in Steinbach, where they finished runner-up to the Generals.

Over the years, the team's roster included former professional players such as Terry Yake, Brad Purdie, Justin Kurtz, Ryan Garbutt, Ian White, Mark Stuart, Ryan Bonni, and Steve Christie.

The Prairie Thunder have not fielded a team since the COVID-19 pandemic ended their 2019-20 season.

== See also ==
- List of ice hockey teams in Manitoba
