= 2002–03 DEL season =

2002–03 Deutsche Eishockey Liga season
- League: Deutsche Eishockey Liga
- Sport: Ice hockey
- Teams: 14

2002-03
- Season champions: Krefeld Pinguine

DEL seasons
- ← 2001–02 2003–04 →

The 2002–03 Deutsche Eishockey Liga season was the 9th season since the founding of the Deutsche Eishockey Liga (German Ice Hockey League). The Krefeld Pinguine became German Champions. The Schwenninger ERC Wild Wings lost their license due to insolvency proceedings and the Frankfurt Lions were granted a stay in the league.

== Regular season ==
The eight best-placed teams in the regular season would enter playoffs, while the last two teams would have to fight relegation in a playdown series.

	Team	GP	W	SOW	SOL	L	GF:GA	Points
1.	Eisbären Berlin	52	30	5	9	8	188:134	109
2.	Kölner Haie	52	26	4	15	7	151:117	101
3.	DEG Metro Stars	52	24	10	4	14	151:117	96
4.	Adler Mannheim	52	25	8	3	16	152:129	94
5.	Nürnberg Ice Tigers	52	23	7	6	16	133:127	89
6.	Krefeld Pinguine	52	20	8	2	22	147:133	78
7.	Kassel Huskies	52	19	7	7	19	118:127	78
8.	Hamburg Freezers	52	17	10	6	19	154:152	77
9.	Iserlohn Roosters	52	17	8	8	19	142:132	75
10.	Hannover Scorpions	52	18	5	5	24	142:150	69
11.	Augsburger Panther	52	16	6	6	24	127:146	66
12.	ERC Ingolstadt	52	16	5	7	24	122:135	65
13.	Frankfurt Lions	52	14	6	6	26	133:171	60
14.	Schwenninger ERC Wild Wings	52	4	6	11	31	99:184	35

GP = Games played, W = Win, SOW = Shootout win, SOL = Shootout loss, L = Loss
= Qualified for playoffs = Season ended = Relegation playdown

== Playdown ==
The two last-placed teams, the Frankfurt Lions and Schwenninger ERC Wild Wings played a playdown best-of-seven series against relegation.

			Game	1	2	3	4	5	6	7
Frankfurt Lions	–	Schwenninger ERC Wild Wings	2:4	3:6	1:2	6:4	4:3	4:7	2:3	–

Despite the Lions having a 25-point advantage in the regular season, the Wild Wings won the playdown series. However, as insolvency proceedings against the Wild Wings opened, the DEL canceled their license and the Lions were allowed to stay in the league.

== Playoffs ==
Quarterfinals
1	Eisbären Berlin	4
8	Hamburg Freezers	1
3	DEG Metro Stars	1
6	Krefeld Pinguine	4
2	Kölner Haie	4
7	Kassel Huskies	3
4	Adler Mannheim	4
5	Nürnberg Ice Tigers	1

Semifinals
1	Eisbären Berlin	1
6	Krefeld Pinguine	3
2	Kölner Haie	3
4	Adler Mannheim	0

Finals
2	Kölner Haie	2
6	Krefeld Pinguine	3

=== Quarterfinals ===
Starting March 12, 2003, the quarterfinals were played in a best-of-seven series.

			Game	1	2	3	4	5	6	7
Eisbären Berlin	–	Hamburg Freezers	4:1	5:2	5:6 SO	3:2	2:1	4:0	–	–
Kölner Haie	–	Kassel Huskies	4:3	1:3	3:1	2:1	4:5	4:1	2:3	5:1
DEG Metro Stars	–	Krefeld Pinguine	1:4	1:2	5:6 OT	1:0	2:5	1:4	–	–
Adler Mannheim	–	Nürnberg Ice Tigers	4:1	5:4	1:6	5:1	4:2	3:0	–	–

OT = Overtime; SO = Shootout

=== Semifinals ===
On March 28, 2003, the quarterfinals best-of-five series opened.

			Game	1	2	3	4	5
Eisbären Berlin	–	Krefeld Pinguine	1:3	4:1	2:4	0:1	1:4	–
Kölner Haie	–	Adler Mannheim	3:0	3:2	5:3	4:3 OT	–	–

OT = Overtime; SO = Shootout

The big surprise was the loss of Eisbären Berlin (Berlin Polar Bears) to the Krefeld Pinguine (Krefeld Penguins). The Eisbären were considered a strong favorite as they finished the regular season with 109 points vs. the Penguins 78.

=== Finals ===
The final series started April 11, 2003 with a homegame for the Kölner Haie who were the higher placed team after the regular season.

			Game	1	2	3	4	5
Kölner Haie	–	Krefeld Pinguine	2:3	2:5	2:3	3:2	3:2 OT	1:3

OT = Overtime; SO = Shootout

With this, the Krefeld Pinguine won the German title for the second time in their history. They almost accomplished this feat with a playoff sweep; this was somewhat unexpected, as their regular season record was not indicative of the playoff performance.

== Top players ==
Category	Name	Team	Record
Most points	(United States) Mark Beaufait	Eisbären Berlin	54 Points
Most goals	(Austria) Christoph Brandner	Krefeld Pinguine	28 Goals
Most assists	(Canada) Brad Purdie	Krefeld Pinguine	41 Assists
Best goali	(Canada) Frédéric Chabot	Nürnberg Ice Tigers	0.945
Best defender	(Canada) Jeff Tory	Hamburg Freezers	46 Points
