= Lacombe Generals =

- City: Lacombe, Alberta
- League: NCHL
- Founded: 1999
- Home arena: Gary Moe Auto Group Sportsplex
- Colours
- General manager: Jared Williams
- Head coach: Kent Wing

Franchise history
- 1999–2016: Bentley Generals
- Since 2016: Lacombe Generals

Previous franchise history
- 1999–2019: Chinook Hockey League

Championships
- League: 2009; 2010; 2011; 2012; 2013; 2014; 2015; 2016; 2017; 2018; 2019
- Provincial: 2009; 2010; 2011; 2013; 2014; 2015; 2016; 2017; 2018; 2019
- National: 2009; 2013; 2016; 2019

The Lacombe Generals are a senior ice hockey club and franchise of the North Central Hockey League (NCHL). The team plays its home games at the Gary Moe Auto Group Sportsplex in Lacombe, Alberta.

== History ==
The Bentley Generals hockey club was formed in 1999 and began play in the Chinook Hockey League. The team won its first provincial senior 'A' title in 2001. The following year, the Generals registered as an 'AAA' club and competed in the Allan Cup playdowns for the first time. Former NHLer Kelly Buchberger was a member of the Generals in 2005, while the team also attempted to play Ryan Smyth during the 2004–05 NHL lockout, though Smyth was ruled ineligible to play.

The Generals, coached by former National Hockey League player and coach Brian Sutter, qualified for the Allan Cup for the first time in 2007.

In 2009, the Generals, once again coached by Sutter, won their first Allan Cup with a 4-3 win in double overtime over Manitoba's Southeast Prairie Thunder. In 2013, the Generals hosted the Allan Cup in Red Deer, Alberta and captured their second title by defeating Newfoundland's Clarenville Caribous 3-0 in the championship game. The Generals returned to Steinbach in 2016 and defeated the host Prairie Thunder again by a score of 4-3 in overtime to win their third Allan Cup. In 2019, the Generals won their fourth Allan Cup defeating the Innisfail Eagles 5-2 in the final game. The Generals have been Allan Cup finalist six other times: 2008, 2010, 2011, 2015, 2017, and 2018.

The Generals are four-time national champions, having won the Allan Cup in 2009 and 2016 in Steinbach, Manitoba, and in 2013 in Red Deer, Alberta and in Lacombe, Alberta 2019. The club, resurrected by proud Bentley boy Travis “Trapper” Stephenson was formerly known as the Bentley Generals from 1999–2016, and played out of the Bentley Arena in Bentley, Alberta, as well as the Red Deer Arena. The team folded in 2019 due to concerns with the organization of senior hockey in Canada.

In December 2015 it was announced that the Generals were relocating to Lacombe, Alberta for the 2016–17 season, citing a drop in attendance as a reason for the move. The partnership with the City of Lacombe was made official in the summer of 2016. The Generals played in the newly renovated Gary Moe Auto Group Sportsplex in the Can Pak Ice Complex, formerly known as the Barnett Arenas.

In July 2016 it was announced head coach Ryan Tobler would be stepping down to work as an assistant coach with the ECHL's Colorado Eagles. In August 2016, it was announced longtime Generals player Curtis Austring would be Tobler's successor.

After hosting, and winning, the Allan Cup in 2019, the Generals announced they would cease operations. The reasons given cited concerns with the organization of Allan Cup Hockey West, the league they belonged to: several teams had withdrawn recently making it difficult to sustain play.

== Season-by-season record ==
Note: GP = Games played, W = Wins, L = Losses, T = Ties, OTL = Overtime losses, Pts = Points, GF = Goals for, GA = Goals against

Season	GP	W	L	T	OTL	GF	GA	P	Results	Playoffs	Provincials	Allan Cup
2000–01	24	11	13	0	-	114	107	22	4th ChHL			
2001–02	24	16	8	0	-	125	90	32	2nd ChHL			
2002–03	24	20	4	0	-	183	60	40	2nd ChHL			
2003–04	28	23	4	1	-	181	79	47	2nd ChHL			
2004–05	24	19	3	2	-	165	67	40	1st ChHL			
2005–06	24	21	1	-	2	123	42	44	1st ChHL			
2006–07	24	20	3	-	1	163	63	41	1st ChHL			
2007–08	20	15	5	-	0	115	56	30	2nd ChHL			
2008–09	24	23	1	-	0	159	51	46	1st ChHL	Champion	Champion	Champion
2009–10	20	19	1	-	0	112	49	38	1st ChHL	Champion	Champion	Final Loss
2010–11	20	19	1	-	0	117	42	38	1st ChHL	Champion	Champion	Final Loss
2011–12	24	16	8	-	0	110	60	32	2nd ChHL	Champion	Semi Final Loss	DNQ
2012–13	16	15	1	-	0	94	31	30	1st ChHL	Champion	Champion	Champion
2013-14	24	21	3	-	0	111	53	42	1st ChHL	Champion	Champion	Semi Final Loss
2014–15	24	23	1	-	0	128	39	46	1st ChHL	Champion	Champion	Final Loss
2015–16	18	14	3	-	1	84	43	29	1st ChHL	Champion	Champion	Champion
2016–17	22	19	3	-	0	116	69	38	1st ChHL	Champion	Champion	Final Loss
2017–18	24	18	4	-	2	115	66	38	2nd ACHW	Champion	Champion	Final Loss
2018–19	18	10	6	-	2	69	57	22	1st ACHW	Champion	Champion	Champion

Allan Cup Championships = 4 (2009, 2013, 2016, 2019)
Allan Cup Finals = 10 (2008, 2009, 2010, 2011, 2013, 2015, 2016, 2017, 2018, 2019)
Allan Cup Appearances = 13 (2004, 2007, 2008, 2009, 2010, 2011, 2013, 2014, 2015, 2016, 2017, 2018, 2019)

== Notable alumni ==
- Travis Brigley
- Jeremy Colliton
- Trent Hunter
- Brian Sutter (Coach)
- Peter Vandermeer
- Darren Van Impe
- Craig Weller
- Ryan Tobler
- Drew Bagnall
- Brennan Evans
- Evan Oberg
- Terry Ryan
- Jeff Deslauriers
- Kyle Greentree
- Tyler Weiman
