= Fort Saskatchewan Chiefs =

The Fort Saskatchewan Chiefs also known as the Fort Hotel Chiefs, were a senior AAA-level ice hockey team based in Fort Saskatchewan, Alberta, Canada. They competed within the Allan Cup Hockey West league (formerly Chinook Hockey League) from the 2003–04 season to the 2018–19 season.

== History ==
The 2005–06 season was the Chiefs most successful as they posted an 18–3–3 regular-season record, and defeated both the Bentley Generals and Stony Plain Eagles to win the provincial title and a berth in the 2006 Allan Cup. At the Allan Cup tournament, they advanced past the quarter-finals with a 5–2 win over the Weyburn Devils, before losing the semi-finals match to the Whitby Dunlops by a score of 4–0.

The Chiefs were eliminated in the Chinook Hockey League's semi-final by the Innisfail Eagles 4-games-to-1.
