= 2009 Allan Cup =

Canadian senior ice hockey championship

The Allan Cup trophy

The 2009 Allan Cup was the Canadian championship of senior ice hockey. This tournament marked the 101st year that the Allan Cup has been awarded. The 2009 tournament was hosted by the City of Steinbach, Manitoba and the Steinbach North Stars. The tournament began on April 13, 2009, and ended April 18, 2009. All games were played at the T.G. Smith Centre.

In the final, the Bentley Generals won their first ever Allan Cup, defeated the Southeast Prairie Thunder 4–3 in double overtime.

== Information ==
Both Quebec and the Maritime Provinces were not represented at the 2009 Allan Cup. It was the second consecutive year that the Maritimes had been unable to muster together a Senior "AAA" club. Quebec missed the tournament for the first time in recent history due to their only major Senior league being on hiatus that season.

A new regional grouping was added for 2009, as Northern Ontario was represented by the Thunder Bay Twins who defeated the Kenora Thistles 2-games-to-1. The Southern Ontario region was represented by the Dundas Real McCoys, winner of Major League Hockey, the only league to fully be taking part in this year's Allan Cup.

This years Allan Cup also featured a rare scenario where the host venue happened to be the home arena for two competing teams. While the Steinbach North Stars were the host team, the Southeast Prairie Thunder also earned a berth in the Allan Cup by defeating the Selkirk Rivermen in provincial playdowns. Saskatchewan was a battle between the 2007 Allan Cup champion Lloydminster Border Kings and the Weyburn Devils, won by Lloydminster.

The Alberta champions, Bentley Generals, defeated the Fort St. John Flyers, the only team registered in British Columbia, to win the McKenzie Cup and the Pacific seed.

== Teams ==
- Steinbach North Stars (Host)
  - Formerly the Île-des-Chênes North Stars.
  - Won 2003 Allan Cup.
  - 19-2-1-1 exhibition schedule.
- Bentley Generals (Alberta/British Columbia)
  - Defeated Fort St. John Flyers 3-games-to-1 to win the McKenzie Cup and qualify.
  - 23-1-0-0 Chinook Hockey League Record.
  - Finalists at 2008 Allan Cup.
- Dundas Real McCoys (Southern Ontario)
  - Hosted 2003 Allan Cup.
  - 19-7-1-1 Major League Hockey record.
  - Defeated Whitby Dunlops 4-games-to-none to qualify.
- Lloydminster Border Kings (Saskatchewan)
  - 10-12-0-2 Chinook Hockey League record.
  - Won 2007 Allan Cup.
  - Defeated Weyburn Devils 3-games-to-none to qualify.
- Southeast Prairie Thunder (Manitoba)
  - Formerly the Grunthal Red Wings.
  - 12-3-1-0 exhibition schedule.
  - Defeated Selkirk Rivermen 4-games-to-none to qualify.
- Thunder Bay Twins (Northern Ontario)
  - Formerly the Thunder Bay Bombers.
  - First appearance since winning 2005 Allan Cup.
  - Defeated Kenora Thistles 2-games-to-1 to qualify.

== Map of teams ==
Host team Alberta/British Columbia participant Saskatchewan participant
Manitoba participant Northern Ontario participant Southern Ontario participant

== Round robin ==
Allan Cup Round Robin
Division One
Rank	Team	League	W-L-T	GF	GA
1	Southeast Prairie Thunder	Manitoba	1-1-0	10	7
2	Lloydminster Border Kings	ChHL	1-1-0	5	6
3	Dundas Real McCoys	MLH	1-1-0	9	11
Division Two
Rank	Team	League	W-L-T	GF	GA
1	Bentley Generals	ChHL	2-0-0	14	3
2	Steinbach North Stars	Manitoba (Host)	1-1-0	7	5
3	Thunder Bay Twins	Northern Ontario	0-2-0	1	14

=== Results ===
Round Robin results
Game	Home team	Score	Away team	Score	Notes
1	Southeast Prairie Thunder	4	Lloydminster Border Kings	0	Final - Shots: 38-24 LBK
2	Steinbach North Stars	5	Thunder Bay Twins	0	Final - Shots: 54-16 SNS
3	Lloydminster Border Kings	5	Dundas Real McCoys	2	Final - Shots: 56-34 LBK
4	Bentley Generals	5	Steinbach North Stars	2	Final - Shots 51-31 Ben
5	Dundas Real McCoys	7	Southeast Prairie Thunder	6	Final - Shots: 37-34 DRM
6	Thunder Bay Twins	1	Bentley Generals	9	Final - Shots: 60-26 Ben

== Championship Round ==
=== Quarter and Semi-finals ===
Quarter and Semi-final results
Game	Home team	Score	Away team	Score	Notes
QF1	Lloydminster Border Kings	2	Thunder Bay Twins	3	OT Final - Shots: 35-32 LBK
QF2	Steinbach North Stars	8	Dundas Real McCoys	4	Final - Shots: 43-36 SNS
SF1	Bentley Generals	8	Thunder Bay Twins	1	Final - Shots: 49-30 Ben
SF2	Southeast Prairie Thunder	4	Steinbach North Stars	2	Final - Shots: 44-33 SNS

=== Final ===
Allan Cup final: Game / Home team / Score / Away team / Score / Notes; F / Bentley Generals / 4 / Southeast Prairie Thunder / 3 / 2OT Final - Shots: 60-45 Ben
