= 2013 Allan Cup =

Canadian senior ice hockey championship

The Allan Cup trophy

The 2013 Allan Cup was the Canadian championship of senior ice hockey. This was the 105th year the Allan Cup was awarded. The 2013 Allan Cup was contended in Red Deer, Alberta, hosted by the Bentley Generals of Hockey Alberta from April 15 to April 20, 2013.

== Participants ==
- Bentley Generals (Host)
- Kenora Thistlers (Central)
  - Defeated Brantford Blast 2-games-to-none (Renwick Cup) to earn berth
- Clarenville Caribous (Atlantic)
  - Won 2012 Herder Memorial Trophy to earn berth
- Rosetown Red Wings (West)
  - Defeated South East Prairie Thunder 3-games-to-1 (Rathgaber Cup) to earn berth
- Stony Plain Eagles (Alberta)
  - Lost to Bentley Generals 4-games-to-none (AB Sr. AAA Final) earned berth by default
- Fort St. John Flyers (British Columbia)
  - Defeated Powell River Regals 3-games-to-2 (Savage Cup) to gain berth

== Map of teams ==
Host team British Columbia participant West participant
West participant Central participant Atlantic participant

== Notes ==
Late in the third period of the round robin game between Bentley and Rosetown, the Generals were leading 1-0 with less than a minute to play. Generals goalie Dan Bakala shot the puck the length of the ice into an empty net to score a goal. It is unknown if this rare event is the first in Allan Cup history.

== Round robin ==
Allan Cup Round Robin
Division One
Rank	Team	Region	W-L-T	GF	GA
1	Clarenville Caribous	Atlantic	2-0-0	12	5
2	Fort St. John Flyers	British Columbia	1-1-0	9	11
3	Stony Plain Eagles	Alberta	0-2-0	4	6
Division Two
Rank	Team	Region	W-L-T	GF	GA
1	Bentley Generals	Host	2-0-0	7	2
2	Rosetown Red Wings	West	1-1-0	8	2
3	Kenora Thistles	Ontario	0-2-0	2	13

=== Results ===
Round Robin results
Game	Home team	Score	Away team	Score	Notes
1	Stony Plain Eagles	2	Fort St. John Flyers	3	Final - Shots: 33-24 FSJ
2	Bentley Generals	2	Rosetown Red Wings	0	Final - Shots: 26-21 BEN
3	Fort St. John Flyers	3	Clarenville Caribous	9	Final - Shots: 32-19 CLA
4	Kenora Thistles	2	Bentley Generals	5	Final - Shots: 42-21 BEN
5	Clarenville Caribous	3	Stony Plain Eagles	2	Final - Shots: 32-28 SPL
6	Rosetown Red Wings	8	Kenora Thistles	0	Final - Shots: 30-22 KEN

== Championship Round ==
=== Quarter and Semi-finals ===
Quarter and Semi-final results
Game	Home team	Score	Away team	Score	Notes
QF1	Fort St. John Flyers	2	Kenora Thistles	8	Final - Shots: 38-28 KEN
QF2	Rosetown Red Wings	4	Stony Plain Eagles	1	Final - Shots: 30-11 RST
SF1	Clarenville Caribous	6	Rosetown Red Wings	2	Final - Shots: 35-27 RST
SF2	Bentley Generals	3	Kenora Thistles	2	Final - Shots: 33-21 BEN

=== Final ===
Allan Cup final: Game / Home team / Score / Away team / Score / Notes; F / Bentley Generals / 3 / Clarenville Caribous / 0 / Final - Shots: 35-33 CLA

== Awards ==
Bill Saunders Award (Tournament MVP): Dan Bakala (Bentley Generals)

All Star Team

unknown
