= 2012 Allan Cup =

Canadian senior ice hockey championship

The Allan Cup trophy

The 2012 Allan Cup was the Canadian championship of senior ice hockey and was the 104th year the Allan Cup was awarded. It was contended in Lloydminster, Saskatchewan from April 16 to April 21, 2012 and hosted by the Lloydminster Border Kings of the Saskatchewan Hockey Association. The South East Prairie Thunder of Manitoba defeated the Rosetown Red Wings of Saskatchewan to win their first national championship. The Thunder were runners up in 2009.

== Participants ==
- Lloydminster Border Kings (Host)
- Kenora Thistles (Central)
  - Defeated Dundas Real McCoys 2-games-to-none (Renwick Cup) to earn berth
- Grand Falls-Windsor Cataracts (Atlantic)
  - Won 2011 Herder Memorial Trophy to earn berth
- South East Prairie Thunder (Manitoba)
  - Defeated Manitoba Lightning 4-games-to-none (Pattison Cup) to earn berth
- Stony Plain Eagles (Pacific)
  - Defeated Powell River Regals 3-games-to-1 (McKenzie Cup) to earn berth
- Rosetown Red Wings (Saskatchewan)
  - Defeated Balgonie Bisons 3-games-to-2 to gain berth

== Map of teams ==
Host team Pacific participant Saskatchewan participant
Manitoba participant Central participant Atlantic participant

== Round robin ==
Allan Cup Round Robin
Division One
Rank	Team	Region	W-L-T	GF	GA
1	South East Prairie Thunder	Manitoba	2-0-0	7	3
2	Rosetown Red Wings	Saskatchewan	1-1-0	5	5
3	Grand Falls-Windsor Cataracts	Atlantic	0-1-1	5	9
Division Two
Rank	Team	Region	W-L-T	GF	GA
1	Lloydminster Border Kings	Host	2-0-0	10	6
2	Stony Plain Eagles	Pacific	1-1-0	5	4
3	Kenora Thistles	Ontario	0-2-0	5	10

=== Results ===
Round Robin results
Game	Home team	Score	Away team	Score	Notes
1	Rosetown Red Wings	1	South East Prairie Thunder	2	Final - Shots: 39-30 RST
2	Lloydminster Border Kings	7	Kenora Thistles	4	Final - Shots: 44-20 LLD
3	South East Prairie Thunder	5	Grand Falls-Windsor Cataracts	2	Final - Shots: 23-20 SET
4	Stony Plain Eagles	2	Lloydminster Border Kings	3	Final - Shots: 30-27 SPL
5	Grand Falls-Windsor Cataracts	3	Rosetown Red Wings	4	OT Final - Shots: 37-28 RST
6	Kenora Thistles	1	Stony Plain Eagles	3	Final - Shots: 25-22 KEN

== Championship Round ==
=== Quarter and Semi-finals ===
Quarter and Semi-final results
Game	Home team	Score	Away team	Score	Notes
QF1	Rosetown Red Wings	3	Kenora Thistles	2	Final - Shots: 39-24 RST
QF2	Stony Plain Eagles	1	Grand Falls-Windsor Cataracts	5	Final - Shots: 28-23 GFW
SF1	South East Prairie Thunder	7	Grand Falls-Windsor Cataracts	2	Final - Shots: 39-32 SET
SF2	Lloydminster Border Kings	1	Rosetown Red Wings	5	Final - Shots: 36-28 RST

=== Final ===
Allan Cup final: Game / Home team / Score / Away team / Score / Notes; F / South East Prairie Thunder / 4 / Rosetown Red Wings / 1 / Final - Shots: 33-29 RST

== Awards ==
Bill Saunders Award (Tournament MVP): Devon Leblanc (South East Prairie Thunder)

All Star Team

Goalie: Justin Harris (South East Prairie Thunder)
Defense: Dallas Fallscheer (Lloydminster Border Kings)
Defense: Shawn Germain (Rosetown Red Wings)
Forward: Devon Leblanc (South East Prairie Thunder)
Forward: Jonathan Poirier (Kenora Thistles)
Forward: Carter Smith (Rosetown Red Wings)
