= Stony Plain Eagles =

Senior ice hockey club

- City: Stony Plain, Alberta
- League: NCHL
- Founded: 1930s
- Home arena: Glenn Hall Centennial Arena
- Colours
- Owners: Silent Ice Sports & Entertainment
- General manager: Chad Hohmann
- Head coach: Jeff Leyer
- Website: Official website

Previous franchise history
- 1989–1991: Chinook Hockey League
- 1991–1992: Pacific Northwest Hockey League
- 1992–2016: Chinook Hockey League
- 2017–2020: Allan Cup Hockey West
- 2022–2024: Chinook Hockey League
- Since 2024: North Central Hockey League

Championships
- League: 1998; 1999; 2000; 2001; 2002; 2003; 2004; 2005
- Provincial: 1987; 1988; 1990; 1992; 1993; 1994; 1995; 1996; 1997; 1998; 1999; 2000; 2001; 2002; 2003; 2012
- National: 1999

The Stony Plain Eagles are a senior ice hockey club and member of the North Central Hockey League (NCHL). The team plays its home games at the Glenn Hall Centennial Arena in Stony Plain, Alberta.

== History ==
Founded in the 1930s, the team moved up to the Senior AAA ranks in 1992 but currently play in the Senior AA North Central Hockey League. They are the 1999 Allan Cup National Senior Champions of Canada.

In 1987, the Eagles would win both the Alberta and Western Canada Intermediate "A" Championship, but lost the Hardy Cup Intermediate National Championship in straight games to Miramichi Gagnon Packers.

From 1992 until 2003, the Eagles captured twelve consecutive Alberta Senior AAA Provincial Championships and reached six Allan Cup finals. They won one title, as the host team, in 1999.

The Eagles hosted the Allan Cup in 2007, the third time since 1992.

== Season-by-season record ==
Note: GP = Games played, W = Wins, L = Losses, T = Ties, OTL = Overtime losses, Pts = Points, GF = Goals for, GA = Goals against

Season	GP	W	L	T	OTL	GF	GA	P	Results
2000-01	24	20	3	0	-	149	56	42	1st ChHL
2001-02	24	22	2	0	-	194	73	44	1st ChHL
2002-03	24	21	3	0	-	161	51	42	1st ChHL
2003-04	28	28	0	0	-	199	56	56	1st ChHL
2004-05	24	17	5	2	-	138	56	36	2nd ChHL
2005-06	24	13	9	-	2	121	80	28	4th ChHL
2006-07	24	19	3	-	2	131	75	40	2nd ChHL
2007-08	20	16	3	-	1	111	64	33	1st ChHL
2008-09	24	20	3	-	1	158	59	41	2nd ChHL
2009-10	20	11	7	-	2	118	73	24	3rd ChHL
2010-11	20	9	11	-	0	88	92	20	4th ChHL
2011-12	24	13	11	-	0	107	106	28	4th ChHL
2012-13	16	4	12	-	0	43	67	8	4th ChHL
2013-14	5	2	3	-	0	21	19	4	ChHL

== Notable alumni ==
- Gordon Mark
- Ryan Smyth
- James Black

== See also ==
- List of ice hockey teams in Alberta
