= Chinook Hockey League =

Canadian Senior ice hockey league

- Formerly: Allan Cup Hockey West (2017-2022)
- Sport: Ice hockey
- Founded: 1955
- First season: 1955-56
- President: Jerry Muise (Interim)
- Country: Canada
- Most recent champion: Innisfail Eagles (10th title)
- Most titles: Lacombe Generals (12 titles)
- Website: https://www.chinookhockeyleague.ca/

The Chinook Hockey League (CHL), named Allan Cup Hockey West from 2017 to 2022, is a multi-tier Canadian Senior ice hockey league based in Alberta. The CHL is one of three Allan Cup-eligible ice hockey leagues currently operating in Canada; the others are Ontario's Allan Cup Hockey. and Newfoundland's Avalon East Senior Hockey League. Since the beginning of the 1998–99 season, the Chinook and ACHW have produced four Allan Cup national champions: the 1999 Stony Plain Eagles, and the 2009, 2013 and 2016 Bentley Generals. The Lacombe Generals have the most playoff championship wins at 12. Stony Plain collected eight consecutive titles from 1998 to 2005 while the Generals recently earned their 11th consecutive title dating back to 2008–2009.

== History ==
Founded as the Chinook Hockey League in 1955.

In 2013, the Chinook Hockey League hired George Vanberg as their league president. Prior to Vanberg, Ray Marsh was league president for over 35 years.

In June 2016, the Chinook Hockey League elected Jerry Muise as their league president. He was vice president since 2013.

The league was renamed Allan Cup Hockey West prior to the 2017–2018 season. In November 2018, the Fort Saskatchewan Chiefs suspended operations, leaving the league with four teams. Rosetown and Lacombe left the league prior to the 2019–20 season, making Allan Cup Hockey West a two-team league.

The 2019–20 playoffs were cancelled due to COVID-19. and the Innisfail Eagles left the league in 2020 and joined the Senior AA Ranchland Hockey League for the 2020–2021 season, leaving the Stony Plain Eagles as the only team in the Chinook Hockey League.

After a two-year hiatus, Allan Cup Hockey West was revived under its old name of Chinook Hockey League for the 2022–2023 season. The Innisfail Eagles rejoined the league along with the Stony Plain Eagles, who hadn't managed to find another league to play in, and a new team who was supposed to play out of Carstairs but were unable to reach an agreement to use the arena and ended up playing a few games in Innisfail before moving to Cremona. The Innisfail Eagles won the CHL championship in the 2022–2023 season and participated in the 2023 Allan Cup in Hamilton and Dundas, Ontario. Innisfail would finish last place in the tournament which saw the Dundas Real McCoys of Allan Cup Hockey capture the 2023 Allan Cup, beating the Clarenville Caribous of the Avalon East Senior Hockey League in the championship game.

On September 23, 2023, it was announced that the Cremona Coyotes would not be participating in the 2023–2024 CHL season, citing "unforeseen circumstances". The league is hoping for the team to return for the 2024–2025 season. On the same day, the 2023–2024 season schedule was announced, the season started on October 14 and was competed by just the Stony Plain Eagles and Innisfail Eagles once again. The season ended on February 17 with the Innisfail Eagles finishing on top of the Spruce Grove Eagles by just 2 points. The best of 5 playoffs began on March 2 in Innisfail with Innisfail winning 7-3. Innisfail would go on to sweep the series with 10-4 and 5-2 wins in games 2 and 3 respectively, sending them to the Allan Cup for the 2nd year in a row. Innisfail was once again eliminated in the preliminary round, finishing in last place with 0 wins and 0 points.

In May 2024, it was announced that the Stony Plain Eagles had left the Chinook Hockey League to join the AA North Central Hockey League and as a result, the Innisfail Eagles had no choice but to also leave the two team league and were also accepted into the North Central Hockey League, thus forfeiting the hosting duties of the 2025 Allan Cup and leaving Alberta without any AAA hockey teams once again.

== Former teams ==
- Alix Warriors
- Bashaw Stars
- Beaumont Warriors
- Bentley Generals
- Big Valley Oil Kings
- Bowness Royals (Calgary)
- Carstairs Colts
- Carstairs Redhawks
- Didsbury Ramblers
- Drayton Valley Wildcats
- Drumheller Miners
- Eckville Eagles
- Enoch Falcons
- Fort McMurray Millionaires
- Fort Saskatchewan Chiefs
- Hobbema Oilers
- Innisfail Aces
- Innisfail Oilers
- Lacombe Generals
- Lacombe Purity 99ers
- Lacombe Merchants
- Lloydminster Border Kings
- Millet Thunder
- Montgomery V's (Calgary)
- Okotoks Drillers
- Okotoks Oilers (senior team)
- Olds B's
- Olds Elks
- Penhold RCAF Wings
- Paul Band Black Hawks
- Ponoka Stampeders (senior team)
- Ponoka Superiors
- Red Deer Border Pavers
- Red Deer Roadrunners
- Red Deer Gunners
- Red Deer Monarchs
- Red Deer Juniors
- Red Deer Burnt Lakers
- Rocky Rams
- Rosetown Red Wings
- River Cree Warriors
- Stettler Imperials
- Stettler Sabres
- Trochu Arenas
- Trochu Blazers
- Sylvan Lake Admirals
- West Central Alberta Rams
- Westlock Wolfpack
- Wetaskiwin Thunder

== Champions ==
- 1969 Didsbury Ramblers
- 1970 Rocky Rams
- 1971 Didsbury Ramblers
- 1972 Innisfail Eagles
- 1973 Okotoks Oilers
- 1974 Olds Elks
- 1975 Red Deer Roadrunners
- 1976 Olds Elks
- 1977 Olds Elks
- 1978 Red Deer Border Pavers
- 1979 Innisfail Eagles
- 1980 Innisfail Eagles
- 1981 Innisfail Eagles
- 1982 Lacombe Merchants
- 1983 Innisfail Eagles
- 1984 Innisfail Eagles
- 1985 Innisfail Eagles
- 1986 Stettler Sabres
- 1987 Eckville Eagles
- 1988 Ponoka Stampeders
- 1989 Paul Band Black Hawks
- 1990 No winner decided.

Paul Band competed in the Hardy Cup with the final never played between Paul Band and Stony Plain.

- 1991 Paul Band Black Hawks
- 1992 Olds Elks
- 1993 Innisfail Eagles
- 1994 Bashaw Stars
- 1995 Millet Thunder
- 1996 Stony Plain Eagles
- 1997 Millet Thunder
- 1998 Stony Plain Eagles
- 1999 Stony Plain Eagles
- 2000 Stony Plain Eagles
- 2001 Stony Plain Eagles
- 2002 Stony Plain Eagles
- 2003 Stony Plain Eagles
- 2004 Stony Plain Eagles
- 2005 Stony Plain Eagles
- 2006 Fort Hotel Chiefs
- 2007 Bentley Generals
- 2008 Stony Plain Eagles
- 2009 Bentley Generals
- 2010 Bentley Generals
- 2011 Bentley Generals
- 2012 Bentley Generals
- 2013 Bentley Generals
- 2014 Bentley Generals
- 2015 Bentley Generals
- 2016 Bentley Generals
- 2017 Lacombe Generals
- 2018 Lacombe Generals
- 2019 Lacombe Generals
- 2019-2020 playoffs cancelled
- 2020-2021 season cancelled
- 2021-2022 season cancelled
- 2023 Innisfail Eagles
- 2024 Innisfail Eagles

== See also ==
- Allan Cup
- Hardy Cup (ice hockey)
