= Lakeshore Winterhawks =

- City: Southampton, Ontario; Port Elgin, Ontario
- League: WOAA Senior Hockey League; Major Intermediate A Hockey League; Northern Senior A Hockey League
- Operated: 1967–1996
- Home arena: Port Elgin Arena; Southampton Coliseum

Franchise history
- 1967-1985: Port Elgin Sunocos
- 1989-1996: Lakeshore Winterhawks

The Lakeshore Winterhawks were a senior hockey team based out of Southampton, Ontario, Canada. They played in the Western Ontario Athletic Association Senior Hockey League and the Northern Senior A Hockey League. From 1967 until the mid-1980s, the team was known as the Port Elgin Sunocos from Port Elgin, Ontario and spent some of their time in the Major Intermediate A Hockey League and in for contention for the Hardy Cup.

== History ==
The Port Elgin Sunocos began play in the Central Intermediate B Hockey League in 1967. In the early 70s, the Sunocos were moved down to the more local Central Intermediate C Hockey League. After dominating the local league for a few seasons, the Sunocos were moved up to the Georgian Bay Intermediate A Hockey League and into contention for the Hardy Cup. The Hardy Cup was the Canadian grand championship of Intermediate hockey. The Sunocos would win the 1979 GBIAHL championship, but lose the OHA title to the Georgetown Raiders. In 1983, the Sunocos dropped from Intermediate A when their league was disbanded and into the Northern Intermediate B Hockey League with the Durham Huskies and Shelburne Muskies. In 1985, the Sunocos went on hiatus.

In 1989, the team was reformed in Southampton as the Lakeshore Winterhawks. The Winterhawks returned to the Sunoco's old league, known a season later as the Northern Senior A Hockey League. The Winterhawks left the Ontario Hockey Association in 1993 when the NSAHL folded from beneath their feet. In 1993-94, the Winterhawks found themselves in the WOAA Senior Hockey League. They played three seasons in the WOAA until 1996, when increasing departure of jobs due to the shutdown of the Bruce Nuclear Generating Station "A" caused many players to leave the area and financial difficulties, causing the team to fold.

In 2007, after eleven years without senior hockey, the Saugeen Shores Winterhawks were formed in Port Elgin. The name pays homage to the original team.

== Season-by-season record ==
Note: GP = Games played, W = Wins, L = Losses, T= Tie, OTL = Overtime Losses, Pts = Points, GF = Goals for, GA = Goals against

Season	GP	W	L	T	OTL	GF	GA	PTS	Finish	Playoffs
1968-69	18	5	13	0	-	--	--	10	8th CIBHL	DNQ
1973-74	23	19	4	0	-	137	60	38	1st CICHL	
1976-77	28	24	4	0	-	182	117	48	1st CICHL	
1978-79	35	24	10	1	-	216	140	49	2nd GBIAHL	Won League, lost OHA Final
1979-80	36	13	23	0	-	149	199	26	6th GBIAHL	
1980-81	34	5	29	0	-	134	332	10	6th GBIAHL	
1981-82	36	20	15	1	-	186	173	41	3rd MIAHL	
1982-83	30	14	16	0	-	150	175	28	3rd MIAHL	
1984-85	24	13	9	2	-	116	91	28	3rd NIBHL	Lost semi-final
Team is on hiatus from 1985 until 1989
1989-90	26	12	9	5	-	162	115	29	5th NSBHL	
1990-91	24	15	8	1	-	152	94	31	1st NSAHL	Lost semi-final
1991-92	25	11	10	4	-	--	--	25	3rd NSAHL	Lost semi-final
1993-94	20	10	7	3	-	--	--	23	5th WOAA Sr. A	Lost "A" Final
1994-95	22	17	4	1	-	--	--	35	3rd WOAA Sr. A	

== See also ==
- Saugeen Shores Winterhawks
