= Bill Allum =

Canadian ice hockey player and coach

- Bill Allum with the Minneapolis Millers
- Born: October 9, 1916 Winnipeg, Manitoba, Canada
- Died: March 14, 1992 (aged 75) Winnipeg, Manitoba, Canada
- Height: 5 ft 11 in (180 cm)
- Weight: 194 lb (88 kg; 13 st 12 lb)
- Position: Defence
- Shot: Left
- Played for: New York Rangers
- Playing career: 1937–1953

William James Douglas Allum (October 9, 1916 – March 14, 1992) was a Canadian ice hockey defenceman and coach. He played one game in the National Hockey League, with the New York Rangers on November 16, 1940. The rest of his career, which lasted from 1937 to 1953, was spent in minor and senior leagues. He later coached the 1959 Memorial Cup-winning Winnipeg Braves.

== Playing career ==
Born in Winnipeg, Allum moved through the local hockey ranks, playing for the junior-level Winnipeg Rangers, and senior-level Winnipeg Canada Packers of the OHASL, competing for the latter in the 1937 Allan Cup tournament. That October, Allum was signed by the New York Rangers, who assigned him to their local farm team, the EAHL New York Rovers. In his second season with the Rovers, Allum was named a First Team EAHL All-Star, and earned a call up to the Philadelphia Ramblers of the IAHL. In 1940-41, Allum played in one game for the Rangers, recording an assist against the Toronto Maple Leafs, but was returned to Philadelphia afterwards. He never played in the NHL again. In September 1941, his professional rights were sold to the Buffalo Bisons of the AHL.

Allum played two seasons in Buffalo, winning the Calder Cup with the Bisons in 1942-43. From 1943 through 1945, Allum served in the Canadian Forces during World War II, and played for Royal Canadian Navy teams in Winnipeg (while serving with HMCS Chippawa) and Cornwallis, Nova Scotia; he played with the HMCS Cornwallis squad in the 1944 Allan Cup tournament. After the war, he returned to the Bisons, and went on to play for the St. Louis Flyers, Cleveland Barons of the AHL and the Minneapolis Millers of the USHL. After retiring from playing professional hockey in 1948, Allum returned to the senior ranks, and played a number of years for the Owen Sound Mercurys of the OHASL, winning the 1951 Allan Cup.

=== Lacrosse ===
Bill Allum also played lacrosse for the Owen Sound Crescents and Fergus Thistles of the Ontario Lacrosse Association. Allum won the Mann Cup with Owen Sound in 1950.

== Coaching ==
After his playing career ended, Allum had a lengthy coaching career in the Manitoba Junior Hockey League (MJHL), most notably with the Winnipeg Braves, whom Allum coached to 1959 Turnbull Cup, Abbott Cup and Memorial Cup championships. The Braves team that year included future professionals Ted Green, Gary Bergman, and defeated future Hockey Hall of Fame member Scotty Bowman, who was coaching the Peterborough Petes. In the late-1960s, Allum went on to coach the Selkirk Steelers.

== Legacy ==
Bill Allum was inducted to the Manitoba Hockey Hall of Fame in the builder category in 1990.

In 2003 Allum was inducted into the Manitoba Sports Hall of Fame and Museum with the entire members of the 1958-59 Winnipeg Braves, honoring them for their 1959 Memorial Cup victory.

Allum is also a member of the Owen Sound Sports Hall of Fame, having been inducted with the entire 1950-51 Owen Sound Mercurys team.

== Career statistics ==
=== Regular season and playoffs ===
			Regular season					Playoffs
Season	Team	League	GP	G	A	Pts	PIM	GP	G	A	Pts	PIM
1934–35	Winnipeg Rangers	MJHL	10	0	1	1	16	—	—	—	—	—
1935–36	Winnipeg Rangers	MJHL	6	3	1	4	6	2	0	0	0	2
1936–37	Winnipeg Canada Packers	MSHL	11	1	1	2	12	3	1	1	2	0
1936–37	Winnipeg Canada Packers	Al-Cup	—	—	—	—	—	3	0	0	0	2
1937–38	New York Rovers	EAHL	56	2	5	7	47	—	—	—	—	—
1938–39	New York Rovers	EAHL	51	6	14	20	59	—	—	—	—	—
1938–39	Philadelphia Ramblers	IAHL	2	0	0	0	0	9	0	1	1	2
1939–40	Philadelphia Ramblers	IAHL	54	6	9	15	53	—	—	—	—	—
1940–41	Philadelphia Ramblers	AHL	55	3	10	13	54	—	—	—	—	—
1940–41	New York Rangers	NHL	1	0	1	1	0	—	—	—	—	—
1941–42	Buffalo Bisons	AHL	56	2	11	13	53	—	—	—	—	—
1941–42	New Haven Eagles	AHL	—	—	—	—	—	2	1	0	1	2
1942–43	Buffalo Bisons	AHL	54	2	16	18	31	9	5	2	7	2
1943–44	Winnipeg Navy	WNDHL	10	0	2	2	4	—	—	—	—	—
1943–44	Cornwallis Navy	NSDHL	1	0	1	1	0	—	—	—	—	—
1943–44	Cornwallis Navy	Al-Cup	—	—	—	—	—	6	2	0	2	6
1944–45	Cornwallis Navy	NSDHL	10	0	4	4	0	—	—	—	—	—
1944–45	Winnipeg Navy	WNDHL	1	0	0	0	0	—	—	—	—	—
1945–46	Buffalo Bisons	AHL	23	2	4	6	4	—	—	—	—	—
1945–46	St. Louis Flyers	AHL	35	3	9	12	6	—	—	—	—	—
1946–47	St. Louis Flyers	AHL	42	1	10	11	38	—	—	—	—	—
1946–47	Cleveland Barons	AHL	26	0	6	6	18	4	1	0	1	2
1947–48	Minneapolis Millers	USHL	63	0	13	13	34	10	0	1	1	2
1948–49	Owen Sound Mercurys	OHASL	—	—	—	—	—	—	—	—	—	—
1949–50	Owen Sound Mercurys	OHASL	42	3	12	15	47	—	—	—	—	—
1950–51	Owen Sound Mercurys	OHASL	—	—	—	—	—	—	—	—	—	—
1950–51	Owen Sound Mercurys	Al-Cup	—	—	—	—	—	16	1	4	5	11
1951–52	Owen Sound Mercurys	OHASL	48	9	18	27	35	12	1	9	10	6
1952–53	Owen Sound Mercurys	OHASL	46	5	23	28	30	11	2	4	6	4
AHL totals			291	13	66	79	204	15	7	2	9	6
NHL totals			2	0	1	1	0	—	—	—	—	—
