= Gerry McNamara (ice hockey) =

Canadian ice hockey player, scout and general manager (1934–2025)

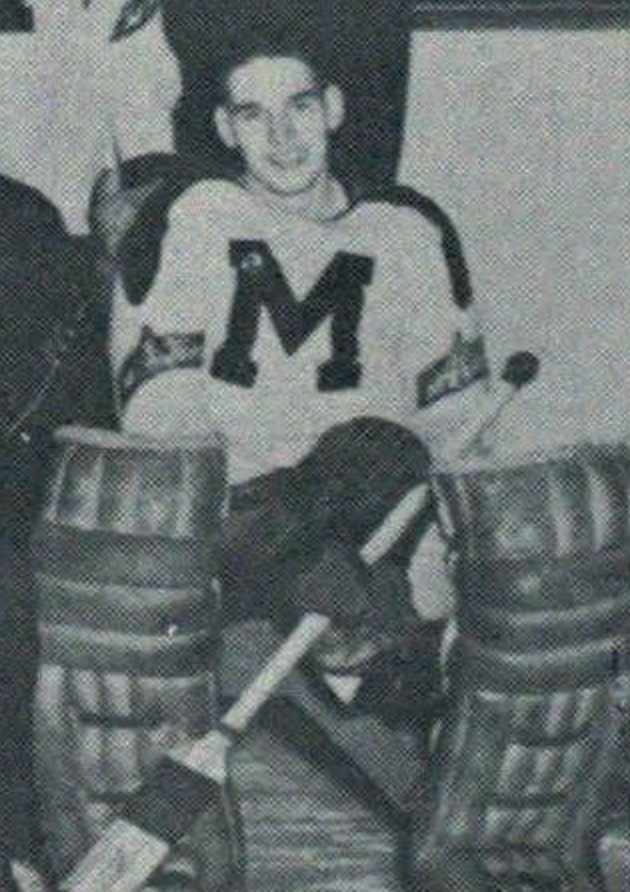
- McNamara at St. Michaels College, c. 1954
- Born: September 22, 1934 Sturgeon Falls, Ontario, Canada
- Died: April 12, 2025 (aged 90)
- Height: 6 ft 2 in (188 cm)
- Weight: 190 lb (86 kg; 13 st 8 lb)
- Position: Goaltender
- Caught: Left
- Played for: Toronto Maple Leafs
- Playing career: 1952–1972

Gerald Lionel McNamara (September 22, 1934 – April 12, 2025) was a Canadian scout and general manager with the Toronto Maple Leafs of the National Hockey League (NHL). Before that, McNamara was also a minor league goaltender, but made seven total game appearances with the Maple Leafs, five in the 1960–61 season and two in 1969–70. He served as general manager of the Maple Leafs from 1981 to 1988, which saw the team make the playoffs three times. He became a scout for the Calgary Flames soon after and won a Stanley Cup ring when the team won the Stanley Cup in 1989. McNamara died on April 12, 2025, at the age of 90.

== Career statistics ==
=== Regular season and playoffs ===
			Regular season									Playoffs
Season	Team	League	GP	W	L	T	MIN	GA	SO	GAA	SV%	GP	W	L	MIN	GA	SO	GAA	SV%
1951–52	Toronto St. Michael's Majors	OHA	5	2	3	0	280	20	0	4.29	—	—	—	—	—	—	—	—	—
1952–53	Toronto St. Michael's Majors	OHA	10	—	—	—	600	30	0	3.00	—	1	—	—	60	4	0	4.00	—
1953–54	Toronto St. Michael's Majors	OHA	57	—	—	—	3420	205	2	3.59	—	8	—	—	480	41	0	5.12	—
1954–55	Toronto St. Michael's Majors	OHA	46	25	18	3	2750	149	2	3.24	—	2	—	—	120	8	0	4.00	—
1955–56	Pittsburgh Hornets	AHL	5	1	4	0	300	19	0	3.80	—	—	—	—	—	—	—	—	—
1956–57	Winnipeg Warriors	WHL	16	4	11	1	965	60	0	3.73	—	—	—	—	—	—	—	—	—
1956–57	Hershey Bears	AHL	22	10	12	0	1320	92	0	4.18	—	7	3	4	430	16	2	2.23	—
1957–58	Buffalo Bisons	AHL	37	14	21	2	2245	149	0	3.98	—	—	—	—	—	—	—	—	—
1958–59	Cleveland Barons	AHL	49	29	18	2	2940	155	3	3.16	—	7	3	4	420	18	1	2.57	—
1959–60	Sudbury Wolves	EPHL	59	31	21	7	3520	236	2	4.02	—	14	7	7	850	41	1	2.89	—
1959–60	Rochester Americans	AHL	2	0	2	0	120	13	0	6.50	—	—	—	—	—	—	—	—	—
1960–61	Toronto Maple Leafs	NHL	5	2	2	1	298	12	0	2.42	.918	—	—	—	—	—	—	—	—
1960–61	Rochester Americans	AHL	1	0	1	0	60	5	0	5.00	—	—	—	—	—	—	—	—	—
1960–61	Sudbury Wolves	EPHL	52	18	27	7	3120	210	3	4.04	—	—	—	—	—	—	—	—	—
1961–62	Pittsburgh Hornets	AHL	35	5	30	0	2100	148	0	4.23	—	—	—	—	—	—	—	—	—
1961–62	Portland Buckaroos	WHL	6	1	3	0	380	25	0	3.95	—	—	—	—	—	—	—	—	—
1962–63	Rochester Americans	AHL	32	10	18	3	1920	123	1	3.84	—	—	—	—	—	—	—	—	—
1963–64	Charlotte Checkers	EHL	29	—	—	—	1740	109	1	3.76	—	—	—	—	—	—	—	—	—
1966–67	Toronto Varsity Grads	OHA Sr	31	—	—	—	1830	112	2	3.67	—	—	—	—	—	—	—	—	—
1967–68	Toronto Marlboros	OHA Sr	37	—	—	—	2210	111	0	3.01	—	—	—	—	—	—	—	—	—
1968–69	Orillia Terriers	OHA Sr	29	—	—	—	1697	105	1	3.71	—	—	—	—	—	—	—	—	—
1969–70	Toronto Maple Leafs	NHL	2	0	0	0	24	2	0	5.15	.833	—	—	—	—	—	—	—	—
1969–70	Orillia Terriers	OHA Sr	25	—	—	—	1500	61	3	2.44	—	—	—	—	—	—	—	—	—
1970–71	Orillia Terriers	OHA Sr	—	—	—	—	—	—	—	—	—	—	—	—	—	—	—	—	—
1971–72	Orillia Terriers	OHA Sr	31	—	—	—	1817	112	3	3.70	—	—	—	—	—	—	—	—	—
1972–73	Barrie Flyers	Al-Cup	—	—	—	—	—	—	—	—	—	1	1	0	0	60	3	0	3.00
AHL totals			183	69	106	7	10,985	704	3	3.85	—	14	6	8	850	34	3	2.40	—
NHL totals			7	2	2	1	322	14	0	2.61	.912	—	—	—	—	—	—	—	—

== Awards and achievements ==
- OHA Sr First All-Star Team (1970)
- OHA Sr Second All-Star Team (1972)

Preceded by Punch Imlach	General manager of the Toronto Maple Leafs; 1981–88	Succeeded by Gord Stellick
