= Petrolia Squires =

Canadian senior ice hockey team

- City: Petrolia, Ontario
- League: Western Ontario Super Hockey League
- Founded: 1960s
- Home arena: Greenwood Recreation Centre
- Colours: Gold, Black, and White
- General manager: Greg Martin; Melisa Martin
- Head coach: Brad Riley
- Website: petroliasquires.ca

Franchise history
- 1960s-1973: Petrolia Chiefs
- 1973-Present: Petrolia Squires

The Petrolia Squires are a Canadian senior ice hockey team based in Petrolia, Ontario. They play in the Western Ontario Super Hockey League and are two-time Allan Cup National Champions.

== History ==
The Petrolia Chiefs were founded in the 1960s as members of the Tri-County Intermediate League. In 1973, the Chiefs won their league but lost the Intermediate C provincial final to a team from Bracebridge, Ontario 4-games-to-none. Also in 1973, they changed their name to the Petrolia Squires as their league became the Western Intermediate C Hockey League.

In 1976, the Western Intermediate C Hockey League merged with the Seaway Intermediate C Hockey League to create the Seaway-Western Intermediate C Hockey League. The Squires played one season with the league and then moved up to the Continental Senior A Hockey League. In that one season, the Squires won the 1977 league championship as well as the provincial championship by defeating the Bradford Comets 4-games-to-1.

The Squires found strong competition in the Continental League, with early feuds with the Durham Huskies and the Lucan-Ilderton Jets. As well, the Continental League competed for the Allan Cup, the National championship. In their second season in the league, the Squires won the J. Ross Robertson Cup as league champions. They went on to meet the OHA Senior A champion Thunder Bay Twins in the Ontario Hockey Association final. The Squires won the series 4-games-to-2 and also won the Eastern Canadian senior championship as well, earning them a berth into the 1979 Allan Cup final. The Squires met the Steinbach Huskies in the National final. The Squires won game one 6-5 in overtime, then game two 7-3. The Huskies took game three 5-4, before the Squires came alive and won the next two 6-1 and 7-1 to win their first national title. To top off this feat, the Squires were invited to play in the World Senior Hockey Championships. During the event, the Squires lost to HC Kladno of the CSSR 5-3 and then tied the Soviet Union powerhouse Khimik Voskresensk 3-3.

In 1980, the Squires were defeated in the league final by a new foe, the Cambridge Hornets. The Squires and Hornets would meet in five straight league championships. Cambridge would win three, Petrolia would win two, but each would walk away with another Allan Cup. In 1980, the Continental Senior A Hockey League was renamed the OHA Senior A Hockey League, as the original folded in 1979.

In 1981, the Squires won the Robertson Cup as OHA champions by defeating the Hornets 4-games-to-1, they also gained a berth to the Allan Cup. The Squires travelled to Thunder Bay, Ontario to compete in a first-time round-robin tournament for the prestigious trophy. Their first game saw the Thunder Bay Twins embarrass the Squires 8-3. Game two had the Squires defeat the St. Boniface Mohawks 6-4 and in game three the Squires beat the Grand Falls Cataracts 6-3. In the semi-final, the Squires drew Grand Falls again, while the Twins drew the Mohawks whom they just defeated 5-4 in overtime. The Squires repeated their 6-3 performance over the Cataracts, but the Twins were shocked by the Mohawks with a 4-3 loss. Petrolia beat St. Boniface 5-1 to win their second Allan Cup.

The 1982 playoffs ended a little tougher than 1981, with the Squires requiring all seven games to defeat the Hornets. The Squires were also Eastern Canadian champions. Petrolia qualified for their third Allan Cup, but were up against a tough Cranbrook Royals team at Cranbrook, British Columbia. The Royal won games one and two easily and the Squires made game three interesting but still lost. It took until game four until the Squires woke up and won 6-1, but it was too late as the Royals took game five 7-3 and the series to win the national championship.

In 1986, the OHA Senior A Hockey League was reduced in size and declared Senior AAA. The Squires dropped to their local Seaway-Cyclone Senior B Hockey League. After two seasons in the league, the Squires seemingly took a one-year leave from the Ontario Hockey Association for the 1988-89 season and returned for the 1989-90 Seaway-Cyclone Senior B season. In a time when all Senior teams systematically disappeared and never came back, the Squires refused to disband and came right back to action.

In 1990, the Seaway Cyclone Senior B Hockey League merged with the Southern Senior A Hockey League to create the Southwestern Senior A Hockey League. The Squires are the only remaining team from the founding of the Southwestern League to still exist in modern hockey. Throughout the 1990s, the Southwestern League, led by Petrolia, struggled to stay alive and fought for recognition from the OHA and Hockey Canada to be declared the top level of senior hockey in the Province of Ontario. The Petrolia Squires and the city of Sarnia, Ontario were awarded the 2001 Allan Cup. In the first game, the Squires defeated the Stony Plain Eagles 3-1. They then met and were massacred by the home-province rival Dundas Real McCoys 8-0. In their final round-robin game, a 2-2 tie with the Lloydminster Border Kings earned them a semi-final berth over the McCoys. In the semi-final, the Squires defeated Stony Plain 3-0 but fell to Lloydminster in the Allan Cup final by a score of 7-2.

In 2002, the Southwestern Senior A Hockey League was recognized as the Ontario Hockey Association's Allan Cup representative and was renamed the OHA Senior AAA Hockey League. In 2004, the league was renamed Major League Hockey.

The Petrolia Squires were the only Ontario Hockey Association Senior level team to have been founded before 2000, were the only team to still exist from the OHA Senior A Hockey League without ever disbanding, and were the only Intermediate level team to have survived and still play in the OHA (not including Western Ontario Athletic Association Senior Hockey League teams, who are not affiliated with the OHA). As of 2008, the Petrolia Squires have been a franchise for 38 seasons and only sat on the sidelines for one of those years.

In the summer of 2008, the Squires left the MLH and joined the Western Ontario Athletic Association Senior Hockey League. On October 11, 2008, the Squires travelled to Thedford to defeat the Thedford Dirty Dogs 8-3 to win their first ever WOAA game. Petrolia had a very successful first season in the WOAA, finishing with a 16-2-2 record, earning 34 points, enough for first place in the WOAA South Division and first place overall.

The Squires were 2010 WOAA South Sr. AA Champions defeating the Lucan-Ilderton Jets 4-games-to-3, but fell in the Sr. AA Final to the Northern Champion Elora Rocks 4-games-to-2.

In 2023, the Petrolia Squires moved to the Western Ontario Super Hockey League when the Western Ontario Athletic Association Senior Hockey League ceased to operate.

== Season-by-season standings ==
Note: GP = Games played, W = Wins, L = Losses, T = Ties, OTL = Overtime losses, SOL = Shootout Loses*, Pts = Points, GF = Goals for, GA = Goals against

| Season | GP | W | L | T | OTL | GF | GA | P | Results |
|---|---|---|---|---|---|---|---|---|---|
| 1969-70 | 26 | 17 | 8 | 1 | - | 173 | 115 | 35 | 2nd TCIHL |
| 1970-71 | 28 | 19 | 5 | 4 | - | 205 | 137 | 42 | 1st TCIHL |
| 1971-72 | 27 | 17 | 7 | 3 | - | 155 | 104 | 37 | 2nd TCIHL |
| 1972-74 | Statistics Not Available | | | | | | | | |
| 1974-75 | 27 | 17 | 6 | 4 | - | 194 | 115 | 38 | 1st WICHL |
| 1975-76 | Statistics Not Available | | | | | | | | |
| 1976-77 | 25 | 22 | 1 | 2 | - | 260 | 60 | 46 | 1st SWICHL |
| 1977-78 | 36 | 33 | 3 | 0 | - | 149 | 107 | 66 | 1st CSAHL |
| 1978-79 | 42 | 32 | 8 | 2 | - | 282 | 157 | 66 | 1st CSAHL |
| 1979-80 | 40 | 32 | 7 | 1 | - | 242 | 112 | 65 | 1st CSAHL |
| 1980-81 | 35 | 23 | 10 | 2 | - | 218 | 138 | 48 | 2nd OHA Sr. A |
| 1981-82 | 35 | 28 | 7 | 0 | - | 188 | 95 | 56 | 1st OHA Sr. A |
| 1982-83 | 37 | 30 | 6 | 1 | - | 237 | 106 | 61 | 2nd OHA Sr. A |
| 1983-84 | 38 | 25 | 13 | 0 | - | 180 | 158 | 50 | 3rd OHA Sr. A |
| 1984-85 | 40 | 16 | 23 | 1 | - | 198 | 196 | 33 | 6th OHA Sr. A |
| 1985-86 | 36 | 18 | 18 | 0 | - | 148 | 149 | 36 | 5th OHA Sr. A |
| 1986-87 | 26 | 11 | 13 | 2 | - | 123 | 134 | 24 | 7th SCSBHL |
| 1987-88 | 30 | 17 | 11 | 2 | - | 159 | 121 | 36 | 3rd SCSBHL |
| 1988-89 | Did Not Participate | | | | | | | | |
| 1989-90 | 29 | 12 | 18 | 0 | 1 | 139 | 196 | 25 | 4th SCSBHL |
| 1990-91 | 30 | 12 | 17 | 1 | 0 | 119 | 159 | 25 | 8th SWSHL |
| 1991-92 | 27 | 15 | 10 | 1 | 1 | 126 | 119 | 32 | 4th SWSHL |
| 1992-93 | 23 | 19 | 2 | 2 | - | 152 | 73 | 40 | 1st SWSHL |
| 1993-94 | 24 | 9 | 14 | 1 | - | 96 | 118 | 20 | 7th SWSHL |
| 1994-95 | 28 | 11 | 13 | 2 | 2 | 121 | 144 | 26 | 4th SWSHL |
| 1995-96 | 28 | 10 | 17 | 1 | - | 119 | 153 | 21 | 4th SWSHL |
| 1996-97 | 29 | 9 | 16 | 1 | 3 | 109 | 129 | 21 | 3rd SWSHL |
| 1997-98 | 30 | 11 | 17 | 2 | 0 | 129 | 152 | 24 | 4th SWSHL |
| 1998-99 | 28 | 21 | 7 | 0 | 0 | 186 | 91 | 42 | 2nd SWSHL |
| 1999-00 | 30 | 22 | 6 | 1 | 1 | 183 | 77 | 46 | 3rd SWSHL |
| 2000-01 | 31 | 24 | 5 | 1 | 1 | -- | -- | 50 | 2nd SWSHL |
| 2001-02 | 32 | 18 | 11 | 2 | 1 | 161 | 151 | 39 | 3rd SWSHL |
| 2002-03 | 31 | 15 | 12 | 2 | 2 | 140 | 146 | 34 | 3rd OHA Sr. A |
| 2003-04 | 32 | 19 | 9 | 1 | 3 | 139 | 122 | 42 | 1st OHA Sr. A |
| 2004-05 | 32 | 11 | 19 | 1 | 1 | 129 | 160 | 24 | 5th MLH |
| 2005-06 | 32 | 14 | 15 | - | 3 | 144 | 165 | 31 | 5th MLH |
| 2006-07 | 30 | 16 | 14 | - | 0 | 139 | 179 | 32 | 2nd MLH |
| 2007-08 | 30 | 6 | 22 | - | 2 | 115 | 154 | 14 | 5th MLH |
| 2008-09 | 20 | 16 | 2 | - | 2 | 104 | 51 | 34 | 1st WOAA South |
| 2009-10 | 20 | 14 | 5 | - | 1 | 109 | 78 | 29 | 2nd WOAA South |
| 2010-11 | 26 | 20 | 6 | - | 0 | 132 | 93 | 40 | 3rd WOAA South |
| 2011-12 | 24 | 14 | 10 | - | 0 | 122 | 102 | 28 | 5th WOAA South |
| 2012-13 | 24 | 13 | 9 | - | 2 | 110 | 93 | 28 | 5th WOAA South |
| 2013-14 | 24 | 11 | 10 | - | 3 | 107 | 107 | 25 | 5th WOAA South |

== Notable alumni ==
- Todd Bidner
- Steve Stoyanovich
