= Stan Weir =

Canadian ice hockey player (born 1952)

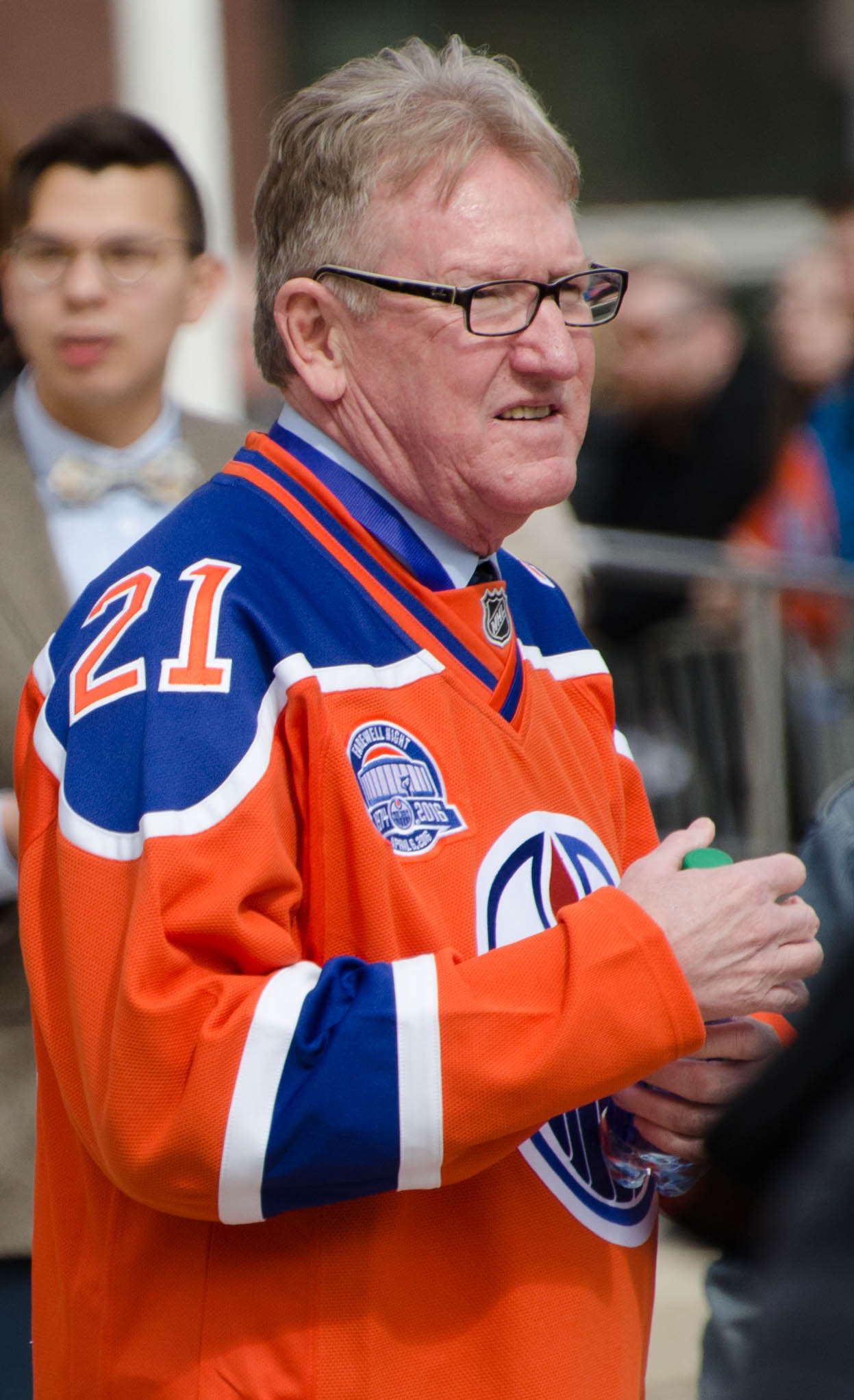
- Weir in 2016
- Born: March 17, 1952 (age 73) Ponoka, Alberta, Canada
- Height: 6 ft 1 in (185 cm)
- Weight: 170 lb (77 kg; 12 st 2 lb)
- Position: Centre
- Shot: Left
- Played for: California Golden Seals; Toronto Maple Leafs; Edmonton Oilers; Colorado Rockies; Detroit Red Wings
- NHL draft: 28th overall, 1972; California Golden Seals
- Playing career: 1972–1985

Stanley Brian Weir (born March 17, 1952) is a Canadian former ice hockey centre. He played on five different teams for the National Hockey League, and one season in the World Hockey Association, over an 11-year career that lasted from 1972 to 1983. Weir was drafted 2nd (28th overall) by the California Golden Seals in the 1972 NHL Amateur Draft, and made his debut with the team in 1972, playing three seasons there. Traded to the Toronto Maple Leafs Weir spent three seasons there before signing with the Edmonton Oilers of the WHA in 1978, playing one season there and returning to the NHL with the Oilers, where he played a further three seasons. He finished his NHL career with brief stints with the Colorado Rockies and Detroit Red Wings, and spent two seasons in the minor leagues before retiring as a professional in 1985.

== Professional career ==
=== Growing up ===
During summers in his childhood, Weir attended Glen Sather's hockey school 200 miles from his hometown Ponoka in Banff, Alberta. Sather would later recognize Weir as the first graduate of his program to play in the NHL.

=== Minor league hockey ===
Weir started playing and earning respect in 1968 while playing with his hometown Ponoka Stampeders of the Alberta Junior Hockey League. In the 1969–70 season, Weir amassed 35 goals and 26 assists in only 42 games, earning him the Ernie Love Trophy (given to the AJHL Scoring Champion) at the age of 17. The following season saw Weir join the Medicine Hat Tigers of the Western Hockey League and win the WCHL Rookie of the Year. Weir also played on a line with future NHLer Lanny McDonald and they became friends. McDonald would later say he considered Weir one of the best junior players in Canada. Weir continued to put up big numbers in the WCHL, scoring a combined 244 points in two seasons. While still only 19, the California Golden Seals had seen enough and decided to draft Weir with their 2nd overall pick in the 1972 draft.

=== Reaching the NHL ===
After scoring 133 points in the previous season, big things were expected of the young centre in the National Hockey League. He jumped right into playing with the big boys and found that his game was slowing down. Weir played 78 games for the Seals in 1972–73 and notched 39 points, a great rookie campaign. However, his offensive prowess was expected to grow as he got used to the speed and size of the NHL. The following season saw Weir scoring only 16 points in 58 games before ending the season with a knee injury. California expected more from their star centre and Weir delivered for them in 1974–75. Weir led the team in points with 45 and assists with 27, but that paled in comparison to the point totals in the rest of the league.

On June 20, 1975, Weir was traded to the Toronto Maple Leafs for Gary Sabourin to rejoin old friend Lanny McDonald. The Leafs were hoping Weir would regain his form and add some depth at offence. In 1975–76, Weir chipped in 19 goals and finished with 51 points on the season, helping the Maple Leafs into the playoffs. However, on a team with scoring greats such as Darryl Sittler, McDonald, and Errol Thompson, his production was underwhelming. With similar results in the next season, the Leafs decided that Weir was used too sparingly and he was sent down to the Leafs' minor league affiliate, the Tulsa Oilers of the Central Hockey League. Weir played hard for the Oilers scoring 57 points in his first 42 games and made some headway when he was called back up to rejoin Toronto at the end of the season and into the playoffs. He scored 15 goals in his last 33 games with Toronto including three in their short playoff run.

Knowing Toronto was expecting more out of him and that he might again be sent to the minors, Weir decided to jump to the World Hockey Association and join the Edmonton Oilers to play on a premiere team. In his first season with the Oilers, Weir scored 31 goals and 30 assists while playing with rising star, Wayne Gretzky, who joined the team partway through the season. When the Oilers joined the NHL the following season, Weir was first claimed back by Toronto before the expansion draft but was then reacquired on waivers by Edmonton a few weeks later. With them, he scored his highest NHL point total with 33 goals and 33 assists. Weir would play two more seasons with Edmonton before being traded to the Colorado Rockies for Ed Cooper on March 9, 1982. After already playing in 10 games for Colorado, the NHL voided the trade after Cooper was found to be hiding injuries and Weir was returned to Edmonton. Weir would not stay put for long as Edmonton traded him to the Detroit Red Wings for cash on September 14, 1982.

Weir played his final NHL campaign in the 1982–83 season. He scored 29 points for Detroit that year and ended his NHL career with 346 points over 10 seasons. After leaving Detroit he played the 1983–84 season with the Montana Magic of the CHL and then joined the Milwaukee Admirals of the International Hockey League for the 1984–85 season. Weir retired in 1985.

However, his retirement was short-lived as Weir decided to play senior hockey in Ontario for the Brantford Motts Clamatos in 1986. He spent a season with the Clamatos and a season with the Dundas Real McCoys of the OHA Senior A Hockey League before retiring for good in 1987.

== Career statistics ==
=== Regular season and playoffs ===
			Regular season					Playoffs
Season	Team	League	GP	G	A	Pts	PIM	GP	G	A	Pts	PIM
1969–70	Ponoka Stampeders	AJHL	42	35	26	61	45	—	—	—	—	—
1970–71	Medicine Hat Tigers	WCHL	66	52	59	111	88	—	—	—	—	—
1971–72	Medicine Hat Tigers	WCHL	68	58	75	133	77	7	3	7	10	2
1972–73	California Golden Seals	NHL	78	15	24	39	16	—	—	—	—	—
1973–74	California Golden Seals	NHL	58	9	7	16	10	—	—	—	—	—
1974–75	California Golden Seals	NHL	80	18	27	45	12	—	—	—	—	—
1975–76	Toronto Maple Leafs	NHL	64	19	32	51	22	9	1	3	4	0
1976–77	Toronto Maple Leafs	NHL	65	11	19	30	14	7	2	1	3	0
1977–78	Toronto Maple Leafs	NHL	30	12	5	17	4	13	3	1	4	0
1977–78	Tulsa Oilers	CHL	42	24	33	57	38	—	—	—	—	—
1978–79	Edmonton Oilers	WHA	68	31	30	61	20	13	2	5	7	2
1979–80	Edmonton Oilers	NHL	79	33	33	66	40	3	0	0	0	2
1980–81	Edmonton Oilers	NHL	70	12	20	32	40	5	0	0	0	2
1981–82	Edmonton Oilers	NHL	51	3	13	16	13	—	—	—	—	—
1981–82	Colorado Rockies	NHL	10	2	3	5	10	—	—	—	—	—
1982–83	Detroit Red Wings	NHL	57	5	24	29	2	—	—	—	—	—
1983–84	Montana Magic	CHL	73	21	44	65	20	—	—	—	—	—
1984–85	Milwaukee Admirals	IHL	26	7	14	21	5	—	—	—	—	—
1986–87	Brantford Motts Clamatos	OHA Sr	17	2	0	2	4	—	—	—	—	—
1987–88	Dundas Real McCoys	OHA Sr	—	—	—	—	—	—	—	—	—	—
WHA totals			68	31	31	61	20	13	2	5	7	2
NHL totals			642	139	207	346	183	37	6	5	11	4

== Awards and achievements ==
- Ernie Love Trophy winner, 1970
- Jim Piggott Memorial Trophy winner, 1971
