= OHA Senior A Hockey League =

OHA Senior "A" Hockey League
Membership	Ontario Hockey Association
Founded	1972
Ceased	1987
Allan Cups	4

The OHA Senior A Hockey League was a top tier Canadian Senior ice hockey league in Ontario from 1975 until 1987. The league was sanctioned by the Ontario Hockey Association and the Canadian Amateur Hockey Association and competed for the Allan Cup.

== History ==
In 1972, the Western Ontario Senior B Hockey League was formed. Members of this league included the Bothwell Barons, Durham Huskies, Lucan-Ilderton Jets, London Kings, Preston Jesters, and Stratford Perths.

In 1973, the league changed its name to the Continental Senior B Hockey League. In 1975, two season later the league became the Continental Senior A Hockey League, making the league eligible for the Allan Cup and parallel with the traditional OHA Senior A Hockey League. The Chatham Maroons, New Hamburg Screaming Eagles, Petrolia Squires, and Port Stanley Dynamiters joined the league.

After the 1978-79 season, the original OHA Senior A Hockey League folded and its top team, the Cambridge Hornets, salvaged itself by joining the Continental Senior league. The Continental league stood alone as the top league in Ontario.

A season later, the league was rebranded the OHA Senior A Hockey League. Gord Renwick served as the league's president from 1979 to 1981.

In 1983, the OHA Senior A Hockey League absorbed the Major Intermediate A Hockey League, nearly doubling the league's size. In 1986, the league shrunk down to three teams, added Hockey Northwestern Ontario's Thunder Bay Twins as a fourth team. The OHA Senior A league spawned four Allan Cup champions from 1979 until 1987. The 1987 league champion Brantford Motts Clamatos went on to win the Allan Cup as National Senior "A" Champions.

The league ceased operations after the 1986–87 season, when it was reduced to three teams and the OHA was unable to find new teams. OHA president Brent Ladds felt that the league had become cost-prohibitive.

The league was replaced in 1990 by the Southwestern Senior A Hockey League which is now known as Major League Hockey.

=== Allan Cups ===
Champions

1979: Petrolia Squires defeated Steinbach Huskies 4-games-to-1
1981: Petrolia Squires defeated St. Boniface Mohawks 5-1 score
1983: Cambridge Hornets defeated St. Boniface Mohawks 4-games-to-none
1987: Brantford Motts Clamatos defeated Nelson Maple Leafs 4-games-to-none

Finalists

1980: Spokane Flyers defeated Cambridge Hornets 4-games-to-none
1982: Cranbrook Royals defeated Petrolia Squires 4-games-to-1
1984: Thunder Bay Twins defeated Cambridge Hornets 4-games-to-1

=== Hardy Cups ===
Champions

1986: Dundas Real McCoys defeated Lloydminster Border Kings 4-games-to-none

== Key rivalries ==
Durham vs. Lucan-Ilderton

Prior to the creation of the Western Senior B league, the Durham Huskies and Lucan-Ilderton Jets had a healthy rivalry running in the various Ontario Hockey Association Intermediate leagues. In 1971-72, the Jets pulled out of the Southern Counties Intermediate B league in favour of running an independent schedule. Durham had won the Provincial Intermediate B championship in 1968 and 1969, as well as a local title in 1971. The Jets won the Provincial title in 1970 and the local playoff title in 1972. The Jets had made wind about challenging for the Allan Cup in 1972, but their bravado was squashed by the OHA Champion Napanee Comets.

The Western Senior B league was virtually built around the Huskies and Jets and the two teams dominated the first four years of its existence. The one common denominator between the two teams was their need to squash the Stratford Perths in the league final each year. In 1973, the Jets won the first ever league title by defeating Stratford 4-games-to-none. A year later, the league became the Centinental Senior B league and Huskies won the league's first title under that new name 4-games-to-2 against Stratford. In 1975, the Lucan-Ilderton Jets won again by defeating Stratford 4-games-to-1. After this, the OHA allowed the Jets to challenge for an Allan Cup spot, but they were squashed by the Barrie Flyers 4-games-to-none. The Huskies got the last laugh in the battle. In 1975, the league was promoted to Senior "A" and the Huskies won the league's first ever championship at that level. They suffered the same fate as the 1975 Jets in the OHA final, losing to Barrie 4-games-to-none.

Cambridge vs. Petrolia

The Petrolia Squires joined the Continental Senior A Hockey League in 1976. In 1979, after two years in the league, the Squires won the Continental Senior "A" title, the OHA Sr. "A" title by beating the Thunder Bay Twins 4-games-to-2, and eventually the Allan Cup. This was the first of four Allan Cups the league would celebrate over the last nine seasons. In 1979, the other Senior "A" league folded and the Cambridge Hornets jumped ship. In their first season in the league together, the Hornets would challenge the Squires in the league final and defeat them in a full seven game battle, 4-games-to-3. The Hornets lost the Allan Cup final. The next year, the two teams met in the final and the Squires won 4-games-to-1 and went on to win their second Allan Cup. In 1982, they met again in the final and the Squires came out on top 4-games-to-3. The Squires lost the Allan Cup final. Then in 1983, the Cambridge Hornets took control, winning the final against Petrolia 4-games-to-3 and won their first Allan Cup since 1971. The fifth and final chapter took place in 1984 as the Cambridge Hornets defeated the Petrolia Squires in the league final 4-games-to-2, but lost in the Allan Cup final.

Overall, the Cambridge Hornets appear to have come out on top in this rivalry winning three out of five league championships in a five-year span and winning an Allan Cup, but it is possible that they "won the battle, but lost the war". The Petrolia Squires, who won two of the five years and an Allan Cup have an edge in history. The Hornets folded in 1987 and reformed in 1999 and again folded due to controversy in Major League Hockey in 2006, while the Squires currently hold the title as the longest running current Ontario Hockey Association Senior team and are charter members of Major League Hockey. In terms of longevity, the Squires came out on top.

Dundas vs. Motts Clamatos

The Dundas Merchants jumped to the OHA Senior "A" league in 1980 from the Niagara & District Intermediate A Hockey League. Until 1984, the league was completely and utterly dominated by Cambridge and Petrolia. In 1981, the team changed their name to the Dundas-Hamilton Tigers. In 1983, the Rockton Real McCoys of the Southern Intermediate B league moved to become the Flamborough Real McCoys and joined the OHA Senior "A" league. A year later Real McCoy sold the team to Motts and the team became the Flamborough Motts Clamatos. After five seasons of domination, in 1984 the Mott Clamatos and the Tigers took Petrolia and Cambridge's spot in the league final. Dundas defeated Flamborough 4-games-to-2. After the season, Dundas was bought by the same company that sold Flamborough to Motts and became the Dundas Real McCoys. In 1986, Dundas and Flamborough met again in the league final, with the Motts Clamatos sweeping the series 4-games-to-none. After the season, the league dropped from seven teams to three and were forced to bring in the Thunder Bay Twins as a fourth member. Motts then moved their team from Flamborough to become the Brantford Motts Clamatos. The 1986-87 season finished with Brantford far ahead in first, Dundas ahead of Thunder Bay in second by a tie breaker, and Cambridge close but in fourth. Brantford met Dundas for the third straight year in the league final and defeated them, going the distance, 4-games-to-3. Brantford went on to win the Allan Cup that year, only to have their sponsor back out and the team fold at the end of the season.

The folding of Dundas and Brantford at the end of the season started a chain reaction of events in Ontario hockey. It began with a few teams folding, and ended with the top tier of both Senior and Junior hockey, the Ontario Provincial Junior A Hockey League, going completely out of business.

== Teams ==
- Barrie Flyers
- Bothwell Barons
- Brantford Motts Clamatos
- Cambridge Hornets
- Chatham Pontiacs
- Collingwood Shipbuilders
- Dundas Real McCoys
- Durham Huskies
- Georgetown Raiders
- London Kings
- Lucan-Ilderton Jets
- New Hamburg Screaming Eagles
- Petrolia Squires
- Port Stanley Dynamiters
- Preston Jesters
- Stratford Perths
- Thunder Bay Twins
- Woodstock Gems

== Champions ==
J. Ross Robertson Trophy, OHA Senior A Championship. Trophy was exclusive to this league from 1981 until 1987.

Western Sr. B

1973 Lucan-Ilderton Jets

Continental Sr. B

1974 Durham Huskies
1975 Lucan-Ilderton Jets

Continental Sr. A

1976 Durham Huskies
1977 Woodstock Royals
1978 London Kings
1979 Petrolia Squires
1980 Cambridge Hornets

OHA Sr. A

1981 Petrolia Squires
1982 Petrolia Squires
1983 Cambridge Hornets
1984 Cambridge Hornets
1985 Dundas Tigers
1986 Flamborough Motts Clamatos
1987 Brantford Motts Clamatos
