= OHA Senior A League (1890–1979) =

Canadian senior ice hockey league (1890–1979)

OHA Senior "A" Hockey League
- Membership: Ontario Hockey Association
- Founded: 1890
- Folded: 1979
- Associated titles: 24 Allan Cups; 4 Olympic Medals; 4 World Championship Medals

The Ontario Hockey Association Senior A League was a top tier Canadian senior ice hockey league in Ontario from 1890 until 1979. The league was sanctioned by the Ontario Hockey Association and the Canadian Amateur Hockey Association and its clubs competed for the Allan Cup.

== History ==
The league was founded in 1890 by the Ontario Hockey Association. At the top tier of Canadian Senior hockey, the league was eligible and often competed for the Allan Cup.

In 1975, the OHA allowed Hockey Northwestern Ontario's Thunder Bay Twins, the defending Allan Cup champions to enter the league. In 1978, the league briefly changed its name to the Canadian International League, possibly to compete with Semi-Pro leagues which were rapidly gaining popularity. The league folded in 1979, when most of its teams vacated to the Continental Senior A Hockey League and Major Intermediate A Hockey League.

Over the course of the last fifty seasons, the OHA Senior A Hockey League captured 16 Allan Cups in 26 appearances in the National final. If dated back to the beginning of the Allan Cup in 1908, the OHA had 24 champions in 38 appearances over the course of the league's history. The league's tradition was followed by the Continental Senior A Hockey League in 1979, which became the OHA Senior A Hockey League in 1980 and lasted until 1987. The torch was then passed to the Southwestern Senior A Hockey League in 1990, which today is known as Major League Hockey.

The OHA Senior A Hockey League set the groundwork for much of the current Semi-Professional hockey market. The International Hockey League that lasted from 1945 until it merged with the American Hockey League in 2001, was founded in part by both the Windsor Bulldogs and Chatham Maroons. Both teams played at least two different stretches in the league. Also, the Sarnia Sailors spent a few seasons in the International Hockey League. As well, the Thunder Bay Twins jumped between Manitoba leagues and the different Ontario Hockey Association leagues until 1991 when the team changed their name to the Thunder Bay Thunder Hawks and joined the Colonial Hockey League as a founding member. The team has since become the Rockford IceHogs of the United Hockey League. The Thunder Bay franchise won 3 Colonial Cups as CoHL champions and in Rockton they won 1 Colonial Cup as United Hockey League champions. In 2007, the UHL has changed its name and the ownership of the Rockford IceHogs has bought the old Cincinnati Mighty Ducks franchise, making the IceHogs a member of the American Hockey League for the 2007–08 season.

=== Allan Cups ===
Champions

1910: St. Michael's Majors defeated Queen's University and Sherbrooke in two games
1917: Toronto Dentals defeated Winnipeg Victorias 13-goals-to-12
1918: Kitchener Greenshirts defeated Winnipeg Ypres 6-goals-to-4
1919: Hamilton Tigers defeated Winnipeg Selkirk 7-goals-to-6
1921: University of Toronto defeated Brandon 8-goals-to-3
1922: Toronto Granites defeated Regina Victorias 13-goals-to-2
1923: Toronto Granites defeated University of Saskatchewan 11-goals-to-2
1927: University of Toronto defeated Fort William Thundering Herd 2-games-to-1 with 1 tie
1932: Toronto National Sea Fleas defeated Fort William Blues 2-games-to-none
1950: Toronto Marlboros defeated Calgary Stampeders 4-games-to-1
1951: Owen Sound Mercurys defeated Fort Frances Canadians 4-games-to-3
1953: Kitchener-Waterloo Dutchmen defeated Penticton Vees 4-games-to-1
1955: Kitchener-Waterloo Dutchmen defeated Fort William Beavers 4-games-to-1
1957: Whitby Dunlops defeated Spokane Flyers 4-games-to-none
1958: Belleville McFarlands defeated Kelowna Packers 4-games-to-3
1959: Whitby Dunlops defeated Vernon Canadians 4-games-to-1
1960: Chatham Maroons defeated Trail Smoke Eaters 4-games-to-none with 1 tie
1961: Galt Terriers defeated Winnipeg Maroons 4-games-to-1
1963: Windsor Bulldogs defeated Winnipeg Maroons 4-games-to-1
1969: Galt Hornets defeated Calgary Stampeders 4-games-to-none
1971: Galt Hornets defeated Calgary Stampeders 4-games-to-none
1973: Orillia Terriers defeated St. Boniface Mohawks 4-games-to-1
1974: Barrie Flyers defeated Cranbrook Royals 4-games-to-2
1977: Brantford Alexanders defeated Spokane Flyers 4-games-to-1

Finalists

1912: Winnipeg Victorias defeated Toronto Eatons 2-games-to-none
1920: Winnipeg Falcons defeated Toronto Granites 11-goals-to-5
1925: Port Arthur Bearcats defeated University of Toronto 2-games-to-none
1926: Port Arthur Bearcats defeated University of Toronto 2-games-to-1 with 1 tie
1931: Winnipeg 'pegs defeated Hamilton Tigers 2-games-to-none
1946: Calgary Stampeders defeated Hamilton Tigers 4-games-to-1
1952: Fort Frances Canadians defeated Stratford Indians 4-games-to-2
1956: Vernon Canadians defeated Chatham Maroons 4-games-to-1
1964: Winnipeg Maroons defeated Woodstock Athletics 4-games-to-none
1970: Spokane Jets defeated Orillia Terriers 4-games-to-2
1972: Spokane Jets defeated Barrie Flyers 4-games-to-2
1975: Thunder Bay Twins defeated Barrie Flyers 4-games-to-2
1976: Spokane Flyers defeated Barrie Flyers 4-games-to-none
1978: Kimberley Dynamiters defeated Brantford Alexanders 4-games-to-1

=== Olympic Winter Games ===
The winner of the Allan Cup was named the top "amateur" team in Canada, this made them eligible to compete in the Olympic Winter Games. The list below includes all Ontario Hockey Association representatives from 1924 until 1960.

1924: Toronto Granites (6-0-0) Won Gold
1928: University of Toronto (3-0-0) Won Gold
1956: Kitchener-Waterloo Dutchmen (6-2-0) Won Bronze
1960: Kitchener-Waterloo Dutchmen (6-1-0) Won Silver

=== Ice Hockey World Championships ===
The winner of the Allan Cup was named the top "amateur" team in Canada, this made them eligible to compete in the Ice Hockey World Championships. The list below includes all Ontario Hockey Association representatives from 1930 until 1962.

1933: Toronto National Sea Fleas (4-1-0) Won Silver
1958: Whitby Dunlops (7-0-0) Won Gold
1959: Belleville McFarlands (7-1-0) Won Gold
1962: Galt Terriers (6-1-0) Won Silver

== Teams ==
Teams listed ONLY in last decade played.

=== 1970s ===
- Barrie Flyers
- Belleville Quintes
- Brantford Alexanders
- Cambridge Hornets
- Kingston Aces
- Lindsay Lancers
- Mississauga Golden Arrows
- Napanee Comets
- Oakville Oaks
- Owen Sound Crescents
- Orillia Terriers
- Thunder Bay Twins
- Welland Steelers
- Whitby Warriors
- Woodstock Athletics

=== 1960s ===
- Chatham Maroons
- Collingwood Kings
- Guelph Mercurys
- Kitchener-Waterloo Dutchmen
- North York Varsity Grads
- Ottawa Nationals
- St. Thomas Royals
- Sarnia Rams
- Stratford Indians
- Strathroy Rockets
- Toronto Marlboros
- Windsor Bulldogs

=== 1950s ===
- Brantford Redmen
- Cornwall Chevies
- Hamilton Tigers
- Niagara Falls Cataracts
- North Bay Trappers
- Ottawa-Hull Canadiens
- Owen Sound Mercurys
- Pembroke Lumber Kings
- Sarnia Sailors
- Sault Ste. Marie Greyhounds
- Sudbury Wolves
- Toronto St. Michael's Majors
- Whitby Dunlops

=== 1940s ===
- Hamilton Tigers
- London Streamliners
- Oshawa G-Men
- Port Colborne Sailors
- St. Catharines Saints
- Toronto Staffords

=== 1930s ===
- Brantford Rangers
- Hamilton Tigers
- Kitchener Greenshirts
- Toronto Goodyears
- Toronto National Sea Fleas
- University of Toronto

== Champions ==
J. Ross Robertson Trophy, OHA Senior A Championship.

1891 Ottawa
1892 Ottawa
1893 Ottawa
1894 Osgoode Hall
1895 Queen's University
1896 Queen's University
1897 Queen's University
1898 Osgoode Hall
1899 Queen's University
1900 Toronto Wellingtons
1901 Toronto Wellingtons
1902 Toronto Wellingtons
1903 Toronto Wellingtons
1904 Toronto Marlboros
1905 Toronto Marlboros
1906 Berlin
1907 Stratford
1908 Kingston 4th Regiment
1909 St. Michael's Majors
1910 **St. Michael's Majors**
1911 Toronto Eatons
1912 Toronto Eatons
1913 Toronto R & AA
1914 Toronto R & AA
1915 Toronto Victorias
1916 Toronto Riversides
1917 **Toronto Dentals**
1918 **Kitchener Greenshirts**
1919 **Hamilton Tigers**
1920 Toronto Granites

1921 **University of Toronto**
1922 **Toronto Granites**
1923 **Toronto Granites**
1924 Hamilton AAA
1925 Niagara Falls Cataracts
1926 Peterborough
1927 **University of Toronto**
1928 Kitchener-Waterloo
1929 University of Toronto
1930 University of Toronto
1931 Hamilton Tigers
1932 **Toronto Nationals**
1933 Niagara Falls Cataracts
1934 Hamilton Tigers
1935 Toronto HC
1936 Hamilton Tigers
1937 Toronto Dominions
1938 Toronto Goodyears
1939 Toronto Goodyears
1940 Toronto Goodyears
1941 Toronto Marlboros
1942 Hamilton Tigers
1943 Toronto RCAF
1944 Hamilton Tigers
1945 Hamilton Tigers
1946 Hamilton Tigers
1947 Hamilton Tigers
1948 Hamilton Tigers
1949 Toronto Marlboros
1950 **Toronto Marlboros**

1951 **Owen Sound Mercurys**
1952 Stratford Indians
1953 **Kitchener-Waterloo Dutchmen**
1954 Owen Sound Mercurys
1955 **Kitchener-Waterloo Dutchmen**
1956 Chatham Maroons
1957 **Whitby Dunlops**
1958 **Belleville McFarlands**
1959 **Whitby Dunlops**
1960 **Chatham Maroons**
1961 **Galt Terriers**
1962 Windsor Bulldogs
1963 **Windsor Bulldogs**
1964 Woodstock Athletics
1965 Woodstock Athletics
1966 Guelph Regals
1967 Kingston Aces
1968 Toronto Marlboros
1969 **Galt Hornets**
1970 Orillia Terriers
1971 **Galt Hornets**
1972 Barrie Flyers
1973 **Orillia Terriers**
1974 **Barrie Flyers**
1975 Barrie Flyers
1976 Barrie Flyers
1977 **Brantford Alexanders**
1978 Brantford Alexanders
1979 Thunder Bay Twins

Bold denotes an Allan Cup champion.
