= Dick Cherry =

Canadian ice hockey player (1937–2025)

- Born: March 28, 1937 Kingston, Ontario, Canada
- Died: March 6, 2025 (aged 87)
- Height: 6 ft 0 in (183 cm)
- Weight: 195 lb (88 kg; 13 st 13 lb)
- Position: Defence
- Shot: Left
- Played for: Boston Bruins; Philadelphia Flyers
- Playing career: 1957–1971

Richard John Cherry (March 28, 1937 – March 6, 2025) was a Canadian professional ice hockey defenceman who played in the National Hockey League (NHL) for the Boston Bruins and Philadelphia Flyers between 1956 and 1970. He was the brother of media personality Don Cherry.

== Playing career ==
Born in Kingston, Ontario, Cherry played junior hockey for the Barrie Flyers, then professional hockey for the Boston Bruins for the 1956–57 season. After one season, Cherry played for various minor league teams, including two seasons for the Kingston Frontenacs of the Eastern Professional Hockey League. Cherry retired in 1963 to teach high school in Kingston. In the 1968–69 season, Cherry returned to the NHL to play for the Philadelphia Flyers, where he remained for two years. He played 145 NHL games, six with the Boston Bruins and 139 with the Philadelphia Flyers.

== Death ==
Cherry died on March 6, 2025, at the age of 87.

== Career statistics ==
=== Regular season and playoffs ===
			Regular season					Playoffs
Season	Team	League	GP	G	A	Pts	PIM	GP	G	A	Pts	PIM
1955–56	Barrie Flyers	OHA	48	18	32	50	69	18	1	3	4	19
1956–57	Barrie Flyers	OHA	52	15	30	45	42	3	1	0	1	6
1956–57	Boston Bruins	NHL	6	0	0	0	4	—	—	—	—	—
1957–58	Quebec Aces	QHL	47	3	15	18	27	—	—	—	—	—
1957–58	Springfield Indians	AHL	12	0	0	0	6	—	—	—	—	—
1958–59	Providence Reds	AHL	65	2	9	11	66	—	—	—	—	—
1959–60	Providence Reds	AHL	71	5	13	18	52	5	0	0	0	4
1960–61	Providence Reds	AHL	68	2	20	22	66	—	—	—	—	—
1961–62	Kingston Frontenacs	EPHL	43	11	24	35	29	10	4	3	7	9
1962–63	Kingston Frontenacs	EPHL	53	28	32	60	10	5	6	3	9	0
1965–66	Kingston Aces	OHA Sr	25	20	27	47	27	11	11	10	21	4
1966–67	Oklahoma City Blazers	CHL	69	8	25	33	86	11	1	4	5	13
1968–69	Philadelphia Flyers	NHL	71	9	6	15	18	4	1	0	1	4
1969–70	Philadelphia Flyers	NHL	68	3	4	7	23	—	—	—	—	—
1970–71	Oklahoma City Blazers	CHL	64	14	50	64	44	5	0	6	6	4
1971–72	Kingston Aces	OHA Sr	21	3	14	17	27	—	—	—	—	—
1972–73	Kingston Aces	OHA Sr	41	10	33	43	14	—	—	—	—	—
1974–75	Napanee Comets	OHA Sr	21	3	14	17	27	—	—	—	—	—
AHL totals			216	9	42	51	190	11	0	0	0	4
NHL totals			145	12	10	22	45	4	1	0	1	4
