= Bob Laforest =

Canadian ice hockey player (born 1963)

- Born: May 19, 1963 (age 63) Sault Ste. Marie, Ontario, Canada
- Height: 6 ft 0 in (183 cm)
- Weight: 195 lb (88 kg; 13 st 13 lb)
- Position: Right wing
- Shot: Right
- Played for: Los Angeles Kings
- NHL draft: 87th overall, 1983; Los Angeles Kings
- Playing career: 1983–1986

Robert Laforest (born May 19, 1963) is a retired Canadian professional ice hockey player best known for his brief stint in the National Hockey League, where he appeared in five games with the Los Angeles Kings during the 1983–84 season season. Born and raised in Sault Ste. Marie, Ontario, Laforest grew up in a hockey‑oriented family; he is the younger brother of former NHL goaltender Mark Laforest.

== Playing career ==
Laforest was selected by the Kings in the fifth round, 87th overall, of the 1983 NHL entry draft, having gone undrafted in his two previous years of eligibility despite being eligible. Determined to make the most of his opportunity, he broke into the NHL during the 1983–84 season and appeared in five games for the Kings. The most memorable moment of his brief NHL stint came in the season opener, when he scored his only career NHL goal, beating Minnesota North Stars goaltender Gilles Meloche. After his initial run with the Kings, Laforest was reassigned to the minor leagues, where he divided his playing time between the New Haven Nighthawks and the Hershey Bears of the American Hockey League. Seeking further opportunities, Laforest spent the following two seasons in the International Hockey League, suiting up for the Indianapolis Checkers, the Fort Wayne Komets, and the Milwaukee Admirals.

After concluding his professional hockey career, Laforest chose to settle down in Welland, Ontario. Embracing a new chapter in his life, he pursued a career in real estate and became a sales representative with Re/Max Welland Realty Ltd.

== Career statistics ==
=== Regular season and playoffs ===
| | | | Regular season | | | | | Playoffs |
| Season | Team | League | GP | G | A | Pts | PIM | GP | G | A | Pts | PIM |
|---|---|---|---|---|---|---|---|---|---|---|---|---|
| 1979–80 | Welland Cougars | GHL | 43 | 29 | 32 | 61 | 6 | — | — | — | — | — |
| 1980–81 | Niagara Falls Flyers | OHL | 47 | 10 | 6 | 16 | 21 | 11 | 1 | 3 | 4 | 18 |
| 1981–82 | Niagara Falls Flyers | OHL | 66 | 31 | 40 | 71 | 40 | 5 | 4 | 5 | 9 | 0 |
| 1982–83 | North Bay Centennials | OHL | 65 | 58 | 38 | 96 | 32 | 8 | 5 | 2 | 7 | 8 |
| 1983–84 | Los Angeles Kings | NHL | 5 | 1 | 0 | 1 | 2 | — | — | — | — | — |
| 1983–84 | New Haven Nighthawks | AHL | 26 | 2 | 7 | 9 | 0 | — | — | — | — | — |
| 1983–84 | Hershey Bears | AHL | 42 | 11 | 16 | 27 | 10 | — | — | — | — | — |
| 1984–85 | Fort Wayne Komets | IHL | 3 | 1 | 0 | 1 | 0 | — | — | — | — | — |
| 1984–85 | Indianapolis Checkers | IHL | 18 | 3 | 6 | 9 | 0 | — | — | — | — | — |
| 1985–86 | Milwaukee Admirals | IHL | 3 | 0 | 0 | 0 | 0 | — | — | — | — | — |
| 1985–86 | Dundas Real McCoys | OHA Sr | 36 | 19 | 24 | 43 | 19 | — | — | — | — | — |
| NHL totals | | | 5 | 1 | 0 | 1 | 2 | — | — | — | — | — |
