= Owen Sound Mercurys =

- City: Owen Sound, Ontario
- League: OHA Senior "A"
- Operated: 1947-1957
- Home arena: Owen Sound Arena
- Colours: Blue, Red, and White
- Head coach: Jack Markle

Franchise history
- 194x-1947: Owen Sound Mohawks
- 1947-1957: Owen Sound Mercurys

The Owen Sound Mercurys are a defunct senior ice hockey team. The team played in the City of Owen Sound, Ontario, Canada and participated in the OHA Senior A Hockey League, the highest possible level of Canadian Senior hockey.

== History ==
Founded in at least the 1940s as the Owen Sound Mohawks, the team was a member of the OHA Senior A league. The league was highly competitive and littered with teams that were constantly jumping back and forth from semi-pro. In the 1946-47 season, the Mohawks made it to the league final, but were put down by the Hamilton Tigers 3-games-to-2. For the 1947–48 season, the team donned the Mercurys moniker.

The Mercurys made it back to the OHA Senior A final again in 1951, and defeated the Sarnia Sailors 4-games-to-2 to win the J. Ross Robertson Cup. The Mercurys pushed on to the 1951 Allan Cup final where they faced the Fort Frances Canadians. The Canadians drove all the way from Fort Frances, Ontario on the Manitoba border to compete with the Mercurys at the Centennial Arena. The Mercurys won game one and the Canadians pulled even in game two. Game three went to the Mercurys and again the Canadians answered in game four. With the momentum, the Canadians broke the pattern and won game five to take their first series lead. The Mercurys had their backs to the wall, with one more loss the National Championship would go to Fort Frances. In game six, the Mercurys came out blazing and defeated the Canadians 7-4 to force a game seven. The seventh game was low scoring, but this played to Owen Sound's favour as they took the game 3-1, the series 4-games-to-3, and the Canadian Senior National Championship. The team's championship photo can be seen at the Bayshore Community Centre's Sports Hall of Fame.

In 1952, the Mercurys made the finals again. Their opponents were the Stratford Indians. The defending Allan Cup champions were upset in full seven game battle, 4-games-to-3.

A year later, the Mercurys made their third straight league final. Their opponents were the Kitchener-Waterloo Dutchmen. The Dutchmen took the series 4-games-to-2 and went on to win the Allan Cup as National Champions.

The 1953-54 season saw the Mercurys push back to their fourth straight league final. In their way was the Stratford Indians. Unlike 1952, the Mercurys took it to the Indians and swept the series 4-games-to-none to win their second J. Ross Robertson Cup in four seasons. The Mercurys did not make it to the 1954 Allan Cup final, as the Eastern Championship went to the Northern Ontario Hockey Association's Sudbury Wolves.

In 1956-57, the OHA Senior A league absorbed many teams from the Ottawa District Hockey Association. The Mercurys floundered in the eleven team league and finished last. The team folded and Senior hockey did not return to Owen Sound until 1969 with the Owen Sound Crescents.

== Season-by-season results ==
Season	GP	W	L	T	GF	GA	P	Results	Playoffs
1946–47	24	12	10	2	76	88	26	2nd OHA Sr. A	Lost final
1947–48	36	18	16	2	176	178	38	5th OHA Sr. A	
1948–49	statistics not available								
1949–50	42	10	31	1	121	218	21	4th OHA Sr. A	
1950–51	statistics not available—Won league, Won Allan Cup								
1951–52	50	23	26	1	227	231	47	3rd OHA Sr. A	Lost final
1952–53	47	33	11	3	273	65	69	1st OHA Sr. A	Lost final
1953–54	56	39	16	1	262	194	79	1st OHA Sr. A	Won league
1954–55	50	27	19	4	208	177	58	3rd OHA Sr. A	
1955–56	48	21	23	4	186	181	46	3rd OHA Sr. A	
1956–57	52	9	42	1	156	314	19	11th OHA Sr. A	

== Legacy ==
For the 2010-11 season, the Owen Sound Attack of the Ontario Hockey League wore the 1951 Mercurys jersey as a throwback third jersey in honour of the 50th anniversary of their 1951 Allan Cup victory.

== See also ==
- International Hockey League (1945-2001)
- OHA Senior A Hockey League (1929-1979)
- Allan Cup
