= Northern Senior A Hockey League =

The Northern Senior A Hockey League was an Ontario Hockey Association-sanctioned senior loop in Southwestern Ontario. Its champions could compete for the Hardy Cup in the 1980s and briefly for the Allan Cup in the 1990s.

== History ==
The league originated as the OHA Intermediate C Hockey League in the 1970s, became the Northern Intermediate B Hockey League in the 1980s and merged with the Central Senior B Hockey League in the late 1980s, before folding due to lack of interest in 1993. In 1986–87, the league, with a few other local teams turned into the Georgian Bay Senior A and Georgian Bay Senior B Leagues - this lasted for one season. Two teams from this league, the Elora Rocks and Shelburne Muskies, still actively exist in the WOAA Senior AA Hockey League.

== Teams ==
- Camp Borden
- Creemore Chiefs (1978-1993)
- Dundalk Flyers (Sr. B 1986–1987)
- Durham Huskies (1983–1987, 1988–1992)
- Elora Rocks (-1993)
- Grand Valley Tornados
- Honeywood Cougars
- Kincardine Texacos
- Lakeshore Winterhawks (1989–1993)
- Markdale Majors (Sr. B 1986–1987)
- Owen Sound Canadians/Woodford Royals (1986–1990)
- Port Elgin Sunocos
- Shelburne Muskies (-1993)
- Thornbury (Sr. B 1986–1987)

=== Champions ===
- 1984 Durham Huskies
- 1985 Durham Huskies
- 1986 Durham Huskies
- 1987 Collingwood Shipbuilders (Georgian Sr. A)

??? (Georgian Sr. B)

- 1988
- 1989 Creemore Chiefs
- 1990 Creemore Chiefs
- 1991 Creemore Chiefs
- 1992 Elora Rocks
- 1993 Elora Rocks

=== Additional Championships ===
- 1985 Durham Huskies (OHA Intermediate B J.F. Paxton Cup Champions)
- 1987 Durham Huskies (Ontario Senior AA J. Ross Robertson Cup Champions)
- 1987 Collingwood Shipbuilders (OHA Senior A J.F. Paxton Cup Champions)
- 1989 Durham Huskies (OHA Senior AA J. Ross Robertson Cup Champions)
- 1989 Durham Huskies (Ontario/Quebec Senior AA Champions)
- 1992 Creemore Chiefs (OHA Senior B Ken MacMillan Cup Champions)

== Central Sr. B Teams ==
- Durham Huskies
- Elora Rocks
- Exeter Mohawks
- Harriston Blues
- Hillsburgh Royals
- New Hamburg Panthers
- Palmerston 81's
- Tavistock Royals

=== Champions ===
- 1986
- 1987
- 1988 Exeter Mohawks
- 1989 Exeter Mohawks

=== Additional Championships ===
- 1988 Exeter Mohawks (OHA Senior AA J. Ross Robertson Cup Champions)
- 1989 Exeter Mohawks (OHA Senior B Ken MacMillan Cup Champions)
