= Napanee Comets =

- City: Napanee, Ontario
- League: Ontario Intermediate A, Intermediate B, Senior A
- Home arena: Napanee & District Community Arena
- Colours: Yellow, Black, and White
- Owner(s): Lorne Smart (Commissioner)
- General manager: Ed Hooper
- Head coach: Walt Gerow

Championships
- League champions: 1958, 1959, 1960, 1971, 1972

The Napanee Comets were an ice hockey franchise based in the Eastern Ontario town of Napanee, Ontario, located in Lennox and Addington County, approximately 40 kilometres west of Kingston, Ontario, Canada. The Comets played in a number of OHA leagues in the 1950s, 1960s and 1970s. Their home games were played in the Napanee & District Community Arena, 170 York St, Napanee.

== Ontario Major Intermediate A ==
As a member of the Ontario Major Intermediate A Hockey League the Comets had a successful run in the late 1950s capturing three consecutive Ontario championships in 1958, defeating Dundas in the final, 1959 defeating Georgetown in the final and 1960 defeating Oshawa in the final. The Comets made it back to the championship series in 1961 but their reign was halted that year by the Port Colborne Sailors. The Comets were led by Walt Gerow and player-coach Les Douglas, a former Stanley Cup Champion (1943) centre with the Detroit Red Wings. Detroit Red Wings GM, Jack Adams was married to Helen (née) Trimble, a Napanee girl. Through the connections with Adams and Douglas, the Detroit Red Wings agreed to play the Napanee Comets during both the 1957-58 and 1958-59 seasons. The games were played on 2/27/58 and 2/17/59. Despite the Comets dominance in Major Intermediate A, the Detroit Red Wings defeated the Comets by a wide margin on both occasions. The 1950s Comets wore blue and white jerseys with a ligature of "Napanee" from bottom left to top right.

== Ontario Major Intermediate B ==
In 1935-36, Napanee made an appearance in the Intermediate B, Group 1 provincial playoffs defeating Trenton, 3 games to 0 in quarter final play only to be knocked out of play in the next round by Belleville, 16 - 5, in a two-game, total goals series. It wouldn't be until the 1969-70 season when the Comets would return Napanee to the Intermediate B playoff action getting one step closer before falling short against the Lucan Jets in the best of seven final, 4 games to 2. They returned to the finals in 1970-71 but this time the Comets captured the OHA Intermediate B provincial title by defeating the Southern Counties Intermediate B champion, Durham Huskies, 4 games to 1. They repeated as champions in 1971-72 in a re-match final with their 70-71 opponents from Lucan, defeating the Jets by a 4 games to 1 margin. The Comets would return one final time to the provincial championship in 1972-73 losing in the championship final to the New Hamburg Screaming Eagles.

== Ontario Major Intermediate C ==
The Napanee Comets made appearances in the Ontario Major Intermediate C playoffs in the 1955-56 and 1956-57 seasons losing both times to Minden in the semi-finals.

== Ontario Senior A ==
The Napanee Comets was also the name of a Napanee team that played in the OHA Senior 'A' Hockey League from 1974 through 1976 before ceasing operations. Their leading scorer during the 1974-75 season was former NHL player Dick Cherry (brother of Don Cherry). Their goaltender in the 1975-76 season was Steve Rexe, the first ever draft pick of the Pittsburgh Penguins in the 1967 NHL Amateur Draft. The uniform of this version of the Comets were fashioned after the black and yellow of the Boston Bruins with an "N" in the centre of the circle.
