= Claire Alexander =

Canadian ice hockey player (b. 1945)

- Born: June 16, 1945 (age 80) Collingwood, Ontario, Canada
- Height: 6 ft 1 in (185 cm)
- Weight: 175 lb (79 kg; 12 st 7 lb)
- Position: Defence
- Shot: Right
- Played for: Toronto Maple Leafs; Vancouver Canucks; Edmonton Oilers; EC Bad Nauheim; Zürcher SC
- Playing career: 1973–1982

Claire Arthur Alexander or Arthur Claire Alexander (born June 16, 1945) is a Canadian former professional ice hockey player who played in the National Hockey League (NHL) and World Hockey Association (WHA) in the 1970s.

== Playing career ==
After a brief stint in minor-pro hockey in the mid-1960s, he returned home to Ontario and took a job as a milkman, with Silverwood Dairies while continuing to star with local senior amateur teams. A skilled defender with a booming shot, Alexander led the Orillia Terriers to the Allan Cup, awarded to Canada's top amateur club, in 1973.

The Toronto Maple Leafs talked Alexander into giving pro hockey another chance, and he joined their Central Hockey League (CHL) affiliate, the Oklahoma City Blazers the following year. He was an immediate hit, as he scored 60 points and was named the league's top rookie and top defender.

In 1974–75, Alexander was called up to the Leafs, making his NHL debut at the age of 29. He finished the season with 7 goals (including a hat-trick) and 17 points in 42 games. He spent most of the next two seasons on the Leafs' roster, posting 21 points in 81 games, and made his most notable contribution in the 1976 playoffs with 6 points in 9 games. Thanks to his former milkman past he was known as "The Milkman" during his Leafs' days.

For 1977–78, Alexander was traded to the Vancouver Canucks. He split the season between the Canucks and their farm team in the CHL, the Tulsa Oilers, but made a substantial contribution with 26 points in just 32 games in Vancouver. The following season, he moved to the World Hockey Association (WHA) with the Edmonton Oilers, posting 31 points on a team featuring Wayne Gretzky in his first professional season. He then spent two seasons playing in Germany and one season in Switzerland before retiring in 1982. Following his retirement he served a brief stint as head coach of Toronto's American Hockey League (AHL) affiliate in St. Catharines.

Alexander finished his career with 18 goals and 64 points in 155 career NHL games, along with just 36 penalty minutes. He also recorded 8 goals and 31 points in 54 WHA games.

His daughter Buffy-Lynne Williams has represented Canada in rowing in international competition, including three consecutive Summer Olympics, from 2000 to 2008.

== Career statistics ==
=== Regular season and playoffs ===
			Regular season					Playoffs
Season	Team	League	GP	G	A	Pts	PIM	GP	G	A	Pts	PIM
1965–66	Kitchener Rangers	OHA	45	2	15	17	26	—	—	—	—	—
1966–67	Knoxville Knights/Johnstown Jets	EHL	67	17	20	37	39	—	—	—	—	—
1967–68	Collingwood Kings	OHA Sr	40	17	32	49	36	—	—	—	—	—
1968–69	Collingwood Kings	OHA Sr	39	30	32	62	16	—	—	—	—	—
1971–72	Orillia Terriers	OHA Sr	38	13	28	41	42	—	—	—	—	—
1972–73	Orillia Terriers	OHA Sr	41	17	29	46	40	—	—	—	—	—
1972–73	Tulsa Oilers	CHL	5	5	1	6	9	—	—	—	—	—
1973–74	Oklahoma City Blazers	CHL	71	23	37	60	34	9	3	4	7	2
1974–75	Oklahoma City Blazers	CHL	33	8	17	25	14	—	—	—	—	—
1974–75	Toronto Maple Leafs	NHL	42	7	10	17	12	7	0	0	0	0
1975–76	Oklahoma City Blazers	CHL	43	25	31	56	22	—	—	—	—	—
1975–76	Toronto Maple Leafs	NHL	33	2	6	8	6	9	2	4	6	4
1976–77	Toronto Maple Leafs	NHL	48	1	12	13	12	—	—	—	—	—
1977–78	Tulsa Oilers	CHL	46	14	42	56	22	—	—	—	—	—
1977–78	Vancouver Canucks	NHL	32	8	18	26	6	—	—	—	—	—
1978–79	Dallas Black Hawks	CHL	7	1	2	3	0	6	1	2	3	4
1978–79	Edmonton Oilers	WHA	54	8	23	31	16	—	—	—	—	—
1979–80	EC Bad Nauheim	GER	44	32	18	50	96	—	—	—	—	—
1980–81	EC Bad Nauheim	GER	37	17	18	35	48	5	4	1	5	27
NHL totals			155	18	46	64	36	16	2	4	6	4
WHA totals			54	8	23	31	16	—	—	—	—	—

== See also ==
- List of Toronto Maple Leafs players
