= Bruce Dowie =

Canadian ice hockey player

- Born: December 9, 1962 (age 62); Oakville, Ontario, Canada
- Height: 5 ft 8 in (173 cm)
- Weight: 165 lb (75 kg; 11 st 11 lb)
- Position: Goaltender
- Caught: Left
- Played for: Toronto Maple Leafs
- NHL draft: Undrafted
- Playing career: 1983–1987

Bruce Dowie (born December 9, 1962) is a Canadian former professional ice hockey goaltender. He played 2 games in the National Hockey League (NHL) for the Toronto Maple Leafs during the 1983–84 season. The rest of his career, which lasted from 1983 to 1987, was spent in the minor leagues. As a youth, he played in the 1975 Quebec International Pee-Wee Hockey Tournament with a minor ice hockey team from Oakville, Ontario.

== Career statistics ==
=== Regular season and playoffs ===
			Regular season									Playoffs
Season	Team	League	GP	W	L	T	MIN	GA	SO	GAA	SV%	GP	W	L	MIN	GA	SO	GAA	SV%
1978–79	Oakville Rangers	SCTA U18	14	—	—	—	840	26	0	1.85	—	—	—	—	—	—	—	—	—
1979–80	Toronto Marlboros	OMJHL	60	31	24	3	3513	247	0	4.22	.878	4	0	4	253	19	0	4.51	—
1980–81	Toronto Marlboros	OHL	57	28	26	0	3215	253	0	4.73	—	5	2	2	272	23	0	5.07	—
1981–82	Toronto Marlboros	OHL	37	16	17	0	2022	150	1	4.45	—	2	0	2	120	10	0	5.00	—
1982–83	Toronto Marlboros	OHL	30	19	8	3	1830	123	0	4.03	—	2	—	—	120	10	0	5.00	—
1982–83	St. Catharines Saints	AHL	8	2	3	1	424	35	0	4.95	—	—	—	—	—	—	—	—	—
1983–84	Toronto Maple Leafs	NHL	2	0	1	0	72	4	0	3.33	.907	—	—	—	—	—	—	—	—
1983–84	St. Catharines Saints	AHL	9	2	2	1	410	41	0	6.00	—	—	—	—	—	—	—	—	—
1983–84	Muskegon Mohawks	IHL	25	—	—	—	1306	100	2	4.49	—	—	—	—	—	—	—	—	—
1984–85	St. Catharines Saints	AHL	10	2	7	1	596	55	0	5.54	.824	—	—	—	—	—	—	—	—
1984–85	Toledo Goaldiggers	IHL	5	2	1	2	310	20	0	3.87	—	—	—	—	—	—	—	—	—
1985–86	St. Catharines Saints	AHL	5	1	1	0	139	14	0	6.04	—	—	—	—	—	—	—	—	—
1986–87	Newmarket Saints	AHL	4	0	2	0	155	13	0	5.03	—	—	—	—	—	—	—	—	—
1986–87	Dundas Real McCoys	OHA Sr	15	9	5	0	853	55	0	3.87	—	—	—	—	—	—	—	—	—
NHL totals			2	0	1	0	72	4	0	3.33	.907	—	—	—	—	—	—	—	—
