= Stratford Indians =

Canadian senior ice hockey team

The Stratford Indians were a senior ice hockey team based in Stratford, Ontario. They played home games at the Classic City Arena.

The team was a member of the Ontario Hockey Association (OHA) and played in the OHA Senior A League. They won the J. Ross Robertson Cup as the league champions during the 1951–52 season.

The team continued into the national playoffs and won the Eastern Canada championship. In the 1952 Allan Cup for the national championship, they were defeated 4-games-to-2 by the Fort Frances Canadians.
