= 1989 Allan Cup =

Canadian senior ice hockey championship

The Allan Cup trophy

The 1989 Allan Cup was the Canadian senior ice hockey championship for the 1988–89 senior "AAA" season. The event was hosted by the Thunder Bay Twins in Thunder Bay, Ontario. The 1989 tournament marked the 81st time that the Allan Cup has been awarded.

== Teams ==
- Bassano Hawks (Pacific)
- Equipe Chomedey Montreal (East)
- St. Boniface Mohawks (West)
- Thunder Bay Twins (Host)

== Results ==
Round Robin

St. Boniface Mohawks 5 - Thunder Bay Twins 3
St. Boniface Mohawks 4 - Bassano Hawks 2
Thunder Bay Twins 6 - Equipe Chomedey Montreal 3
Equipe Chomedey Montreal 8 - Bassano Hawks 7 (OT)
Thunder Bay Twins 7 - Bassano Hawks 1
St. Boniface Mohawks 9 - Equipe Chomedey Montreal 7

Semi-final

Thunder Bay Twins 6 - Equipe Chomedey Montreal 3

Best-of-3 Final

Thunder Bay Twins 2 - St. Boniface Mohawks 0
Thunder Bay Twins 4 - St. Boniface Mohawks 2
