= Steve Rexe =

Canadian ice hockey player (1947–2013)

- Born: February 26, 1947 Peterborough, Ontario, Canada
- Died: November 12, 2013 (aged 66) Belleville, Ontario, Canada
- Height: 5 ft 10 in (178 cm)
- Weight: 185 lb (84 kg; 13 st 3 lb)
- Position: Goaltender
- Played for: Peterborough Petes; Ottawa Nationals (OHA Sr.); Belleville Mohawks; Belleville Quintes; Greensboro Generals; Springfield Kings; Springfield Indians; Napanee Comets; Binghamton Dusters; Lindsay Lancers
- National team: Canada
- NHL draft: 2nd overall, 1967; Pittsburgh Penguins
- Playing career: 1967–1977

Stephen Glen Rexe (February 26, 1947 – November 12, 2013) was a Canadian professional ice hockey goaltender, the first-ever draft pick of the Pittsburgh Penguins of the National Hockey League (NHL) and second overall pick in the 1967 NHL Amateur Draft.

== Biography ==
Rexe played junior hockey with the Ontario Major Junior A, Peterborough Petes. In 1967, Rexe was offered a contract by Penguins general manager, Jack Riley, at $7,500 for one season with a $7,500 signing bonus. Rather than sign with Pittsburgh, Rexe chose to join the Canadian national hockey team as an amateur. At the 1969 Ice Hockey World Championships Rexe (and Ken Dryden) backed up Wayne Stephenson on the way to a 4th place finish. He played in one game, a 5-1 loss to Sweden on March 21, where he came on in relief and played the final 25 minutes and 10 seconds, giving up two goals in 10 shots, to Lennart Svedberg and Stig-Göran Johansson. Rexe spent the rest of his hockey career playing in minor hockey leagues without ever appearing in an NHL game.

Rexe was primarily a second and third string goaltender for the Canadian national team. He went on to play with the Ottawa Nationals, Belleville Mohawks, Belleville Quintes of the Ontario Hockey Association Senior League, Greensboro Generals of the Eastern Hockey League, the Springfield Kings of the American Hockey League (AHL), where he back-stopped the Kings to a Calder Cup title in 1975, the Springfield Indians also of the AHL, Napanee Comets and Lindsay Lancers of the OHA Sr. League, Binghamton Dusters of the North American Hockey League. He owned and coached the OPJHL Whitby Lawmen in the 1984–85 season.

Rexe resided in Belleville, Ontario with his wife Maureen and their four children. After hockey, Rexe worked in the import / export automobile industry. He died at his home in Belleville on Tuesday, November 12, 2013 at the age of 66.

In an interview with an Ottawa Sun reporter in April 2008, Rexe stated that he considered it an honour to have been the first-ever pick of the Pittsburgh Penguins, and would have been delighted if the Pens would have invited him to Pittsburgh to drop the first puck when they open their new arena.

| Preceded by None | Pittsburgh Penguins first-round draft pick 1967 | Succeeded by Garry Swain |
