= Orillia Terriers (senior and intermediate hockey) =

Canadian senior ice hockey team

- City: Orillia, Ontario
- League: OHA Senior "A" 1966-1979; Georgian Bay Int. "A" 1979-1980; Major Int. A 1980-1982
- Operated: 1966-1982
- Home arena: Orillia Arena
- Colours: Unknown
- Head coach: Ike Hildebrand, Joseph Kane, Doug Kelcher

The Orillia Terriers were a Canadian senior ice hockey team from Orillia, Ontario, Canada that competed in the OHA Senior A from 1966 to 1979, and represented in the Central Ontario Junior B Hockey League from 1979 to 1981 (Intermediate A) by the Orillia Travelways, and for the 1981-82 season by the Orillia Terriers in the Ontario Junior A Hockey League.

The Terriers are not known to be connected with the Couchiching Terriers of the Ontario Provincial Junior A Hockey League, although the junior club was known as the Orillia Terriers from 1989 to 1997.

== History ==
The team originated as the Orillia Pepsis in 1966, but changed their name to the Terriers in 1969.

The Terriers won the J. Ross Robertson Cup as the OHA Senior A League champions in 1970 and 1973. The Terriers also won the 1973 Allan Cup as Canadian Senior A champions, defeating the visiting St. Boniface Mohawks of Manitoba 4-1 in a best-of-seven final playdown series. They had lost the 1970 national final to the Spokane Jets.

The 1972-73 edition of the club featured a number of veterans like Mike Draper, Gary Milroy and Grant Moore, all of whom had been in place since the first season, 1968-69. Also on the team were: Claire Alexander, who later played for the Toronto Maple Leafs; Jim Keon, brother of then-Leaf captain Dave Keon; Blake Ball, who played Gilmore Tuttle in the 1977 film "Slap Shot"; and goalie Louis Levasseur, who went on to all-star status in the World Hockey Association.

Orillia dropped down to Intermediate A in 1979 and left that league in 1982.

== Season-by-season results ==
Season	GP	W	L	T	GF	GA	P	Results	Playoffs
1966-67	40	12	26	2	157	207	26	8th OHA Sr. A	
1967-68	40	11	29	0	146	211	22	10th OHA Sr. A	
1968-69	39	23	15	1	184	144	47	3rd OHA Sr. A	
1969-70	40	31	7	2	201	109	64	OHA Sr. A	Won league
1970-71	39	27	12	0	232	141	54	OHA Sr. A	Lost final
1971-72	40	26	13	1	222	150	53	3rd OHA Sr. A	
1972-73	44	31	13	0	214	132	62	2nd OHA Sr. A	Won league, Won Allan Cup
1973-74	40	29	11	0	203	126	58	2nd OHA Sr. A	Lost final
1974-75	40	18	22	0	189	200	36	4th OHA Sr. A	
1975-76	44	13	30	1	161	255	27	6th OHA Sr. A	
1976-77	34	14	19	1	168	164	29	6th OHA Sr. A	
1977-78	40	16	22	2	184	191	34	6th OHA Sr. A	
1978-79	40	14	25	1	202	241	29	5th OHA Sr. A	
1979-80	36	17	19	0	167	195	34	5th GBIAHL	
1980-81	36	20	16	0	203	186	40	4th OHA Int. A	
1981-82	36	12	22	2	161	230	26	4th OHA Int. A	

== Notable alumni ==
- Claire Alexander
- Brent Ladds, president of the Ontario Hockey Association
- Jean-Louis Levasseur
- Wayne Rutledge
