= 1981 Allan Cup =

Canadian senior ice hockey championship

The Allan Cup trophy

The 1981 Allan Cup was the Canadian senior ice hockey championship for the 1980–81 senior "A" season. The event was hosted by the Thunder Bay Twins in Thunder Bay, Ontario. The 1981 tournament marked the 73rd time that the Allan Cup has been awarded.

== Teams ==
- Grand Falls Cataracts (Atlantic)
- Petrolia Squires (East)
- St. Boniface Mohawks (West)
- Thunder Bay Twins (Host)

== Results ==
Round Robin

Grand Falls Cataracts 3 - St. Boniface Mohawks 2
Thunder Bay Twins 8 - Petrolia Squires 3
Thunder Bay Twins 9 - Grand Falls Cataracts 4
Petrolia Squires 6 - St. Boniface Mohawks 4
Thunder Bay Twins 5 - St. Boniface Mohawks 4 (OT)
Petrolia Squires 6 - Grand Falls Cataracts 3

Semi-final

St. Boniface Mohawks 4 - Thunder Bay Twins 3
Petrolia Squires 6 - Grand Falls Cataracts 3

Final

Petrolia Squires 5 - St. Boniface Mohawks 1
