= 1952 Allan Cup =

Canadian senior ice hockey championship

The Allan Cup trophy

The 1952 Allan Cup was the Canadian senior ice hockey championship for the 1951–52 senior "A" season. The event was hosted by the Fort Frances Canadians and Fort Frances, Ontario. The 1952 playoff marked the 44th time that the Allan Cup has been awarded.

== Teams ==
- Stratford Indians (Eastern Canadian Champions)
- Fort Frances Canadians (Western Canadian Champions)

== Playdowns ==
=== Allan Cup Best-of-Seven Series ===
Fort Frances Canadians defeated Stratford Indians 4-games-to-2

Fort Frances Canadians 9 - Stratford Indians 5
Stratford Indians 3 - Fort Frances Canadians 0
Fort Frances Canadians 6 - Stratford Indians 5
Fort Frances Canadians 5 - Stratford Indians 3
Stratford Indians 2 - Fort Frances Canadians 1
Fort Frances Canadians 4 - Stratford Indians 1

=== Eastern Playdowns ===
Quarter-final

Pembroke Lumber Kings defeated St. Francis Xavier X-Men 3-games-to-none with 1 tie

Pembroke Lumber Kings 4 - St. Francis Xavier Xmen 3
Pembroke Lumber Kings 3 - St. Francis Xavier Xmen 3
Pembroke Lumber Kings 8 - St. Francis Xavier Xmen 1
Pembroke Lumber Kings 3 - St. Francis Xavier Xmen 2

Semi-final

Stratford Indians defeated Sault Ste. Marie Greyhounds 4-games-to-none with 1 tie

Stratford Indians 2 - Sault Ste. Marie Greyhounds 2
Stratford Indians 4 - Sault Ste. Marie Greyhounds 3
Stratford Indians 4 - Sault Ste. Marie Greyhounds 3
Stratford Indians 5 - Sault Ste. Marie Greyhounds 2
Stratford Indians 5 - Sault Ste. Marie Greyhounds 2

Pembroke Lumber Kings defeated Jonquiere Aces 3-games-to-1

Pembroke Lumber Kings 3 - Jonquiere Aces 2
Jonquiere Aces 5 - Pembroke Lumber Kings 3
Pembroke Lumber Kings 4 - Jonquiere Aces 3
Pembroke Lumber Kings 7 - Jonquiere Aces 3

Final

Stratford Indians defeated Pembroke Lumber Kings 4-games-to-1

Stratford Indians 5 - Pembroke Lumber Kings 3
Stratford Indians 3 - Pembroke Lumber Kings 0
Pembroke Lumber Kings 7 - Stratford Indians 4
Stratford Indians 7 - Pembroke Lumber Kings 5
Stratford Indians 6 - Pembroke Lumber Kings 4

=== Western Playdowns ===
Quarter-final

Edmonton Pats defeated Melville Millionaires 4-games-to-none

Edmonton Pats 5 - Melville Millionaires 0
Edmonton Pats 6 - Melville Millionaires 3
Edmonton Pats 5 - Melville Millionaires 3
Edmonton Pats 4 - Melville Millionaires 1

Semi-final

Edmonton Pats defeated Trail Smoke Eaters 4-games-to-2

Edmonton Pats 5 - Trail Smoke Eaters 2
Trail Smoke Eaters 4 - Edmonton Pats 2
Edmonton Pats 4 - Trail Smoke Eaters 2
Edmonton Pats 4 - Trail Smoke Eaters 2
Trail Smoke Eaters 5 - Edmonton Pats 4
Edmonton Pats 2 - Trail Smoke Eaters 1

Fort Frances Canadians defeated Letellier Maple Leafs 4-games-to-2 with 1 tie

Fort Frances Canadians 7 - Letellier Maple Leafs 2
Fort Frances Canadians 4 - Letellier Maple Leafs 4
Fort Frances Canadians 10 - Letellier Maple Leafs 3
Letellier Maple Leafs 5 - Fort Frances Canadians 2
Letellier Maple Leafs 2 - Fort Frances Canadians 1
Fort Frances Canadians 8 - Letellier Maple Leafs 2
Fort Frances Canadians 5 - Letellier Maple Leafs 4

Final

Fort Frances Canadians defeated Edmonton Pats 4-games-to-1 with 1 tie

Fort Frances Canadians 3 - Edmonton Pats 3
Fort Frances Canadians 6 - Edmonton Pats 5
Edmonton Pats 4 - Fort Frances Canadians 2
Fort Frances Canadians 7 - Edmonton Pats 1
Fort Frances Canadians 7 - Edmonton Pats 1
Fort Frances Canadians 5 - Edmonton Pats 3
