= 1983 Allan Cup =

Canadian senior ice hockey championship

The Allan Cup trophy

The 1983 Allan Cup was the Canadian senior ice hockey championship for the 1982–83 senior "A" season. The event was hosted by the Cambridge Hornets in Cambridge, Ontario. The 1983 playoff marked the 75th time that the Allan Cup has been awarded.

== Teams ==
- Cambridge Hornets (Eastern Canadian Champions)
- St. Boniface Mohawks (Western Canadian Champions)

== Best-of-Seven Series ==
Cambridge Hornets 4 - St. Boniface Mohawks 3
Cambridge Hornets 7 - St. Boniface Mohawks 6
Cambridge Hornets 9 - St. Boniface Mohawks 2
Cambridge Hornets 4 - St. Boniface Mohawks 1
