= 1975 Allan Cup =

Canadian senior ice hockey championship

The Allan Cup

The 1975 Allan Cup was the Canadian senior ice hockey championship for the 1974–75 season. The event was hosted by both Barrie and Thunder Bay, Ontario. The 1975 playoff marked the 67th time that the Allan Cup has been awarded. The Thunder Bay Twins represented Western Canada and defeated the Barrie Flyers who represented Eastern Canada in the championship series.

== History ==
The Thunder Bay Twins were led by Dave Siciliano, as their player-coach for the 1974–75 season. The Twins played in the United States Hockey League (USHL) and won the final round of the league's playoffs with three consecutive wins versus Waterloo Black Hawks in a best-of-five series. The Twins had chosen not to participate in the 1975 Allan Cup playoffs due to scheduling conflicts with the USHL playoffs. After the St. Boniface Mohawks appealed for reconsideration, the Twins entered the Allan Cup playoffs upon the conclusion of the USHL playoffs, then won the series versus the Mohawks. In the Western Canada finals, the Twins won the best-of-five series with three consecutive victories versus the Spokane Flyers. The Twins scored five goals in the last 25 minutes of the decisive third game, including the winning goal scored with six seconds remaining. In a best-of-seven series for the national championship, Siciliano and the Twins won the Allan Cup by defeating the defending champion Barrie Flyers four games to two. The Twins then withdrew from the USHL due to travel costs and schedule commitments to represent Canada on a European tour in the 1975–76 season.

== Best-of-seven series ==
Barrie Flyers 8 - Thunder Bay Twins 5
Thunder Bay Twins 7 - Barrie Flyers 2
Barrie Flyers 7 - Thunder Bay Twins 4
Thunder Bay Twins 8 - Barrie Flyers 2
Thunder Bay Twins 5 - Barrie Flyers 2
Thunder Bay Twins 8 - Barrie Flyers 4
