= Georgetown Raiders (senior) =

- City: Georgetown, Ontario
- League: Central Int. "B" 1968-1970; Niagara Int. "A" 1970-1979; Georgian Bay Int. "A" 1979-1980; Major Int. "A" 1980-1983; OHA Sr. "A" 1983-1986
- Operated: 1953-1986
- Home arena: Georgetown Arena
- Colours: Blue, Red, and White

The Georgetown Raiders were an ice hockey team from Georgetown, Ontario, Canada. They competed in the OHA Senior A and Intermediate A ranks in the 1970s and 1980s.

The Raiders won the W.G. Hardy Trophy, also known as the Hardy Cup, as the Canadian Intermediate A champions in 1982. They are not known to be connected to another Georgetown Raiders team which is currently a member of the Ontario Provincial Junior A Hockey League.

== History ==
Georgetown was an entry in the Niagara District Intermediate A Hockey League, which folded in 1979. Georgetown was one of two teams from that loop (the Dundas Merchants were the other) to be accepted into the Georgian Bay Intermediate A league, with which the Niagara league had played an interlocking schedule. The league changed its name to the Major Intermediate A Hockey League in 1980.

The Raiders played four years in the Georgian Bay/Major league and finished in first place three times. They also advanced to the playoff final in all four seasons, losing to Dundas in 1980, beating the Owen Sound Greys in 1981, defeating the Collingwood Shipbuilders in 1982 and losing to Collingwood in 1983.

In 1982, the Raiders became the first OHA team to ever win the Hardy Cup. Only two Ontario teams ever won it, the other being the Dundas Real McCoys in 1986. The Hardy Cup was the Senior "AA"/Intermediate "A" National Championship.

The Major Intermediate A league folded in 1983. Georgetown was one of three teams accepted into the OHA Senior A league. Its fate after this point is not known.

== Season-by-season results ==
Season	GP	W	L	T	GF	GA	P	Results	Playoffs
1978-79	33	23	9	1	219	123	47	1st NIAHL	Won League
1979-80	36	19	16	1	189	176	39	3rd GBIAHL	
1980-81	36	32	3	1	267	116	65	1st OHA Int. A	Won League
1981-82	36	32	4	0	289	132	64	1st OHA Int. A	Won League, Won Hardy Cup
1982-83	29	24	5	0	238	105	48	1st OHA Int. A	Lost Final
1983-84	38	25	12	1	235	154	51	2nd OHA Sr. A	
1984-85	39	24	15	0	235	156	48	3rd OHA Sr. A	
1985-86	36	21	14	1	153	155	43	3rd OHA Sr. A	
