= Brantford Motts Clamatos =

Canadian senior ice hockey team

- City: Brantford
- League: OHA Senior A
- Home arena: Brantford Civic Centre
- Head coach: Ken Mann

The Brantford Motts Clamatos was a Canadian senior ice hockey team in the Ontario Hockey Association's Senior A Hockey League, from Brantford, Ontario. The team played their games at the Brantford Civic Centre in the 1980s. The Brantford Motts Clamatos, sponsored by the Mott's company, which produced a drink called Clamato, won the Allan Cup, the top tier Canadian senior ice hockey league in the province of Ontario, in 1987.

== Championships ==
Brantford won the J. Ross Robertson Cup as league champions during the 1986–87 season.

1986–87 – Allan Cup Champions

- at Brantford, Brantford Motts Clamatos defeat the Nelson Maple Leafs 4-0
  - Friday April 24 – Nelson Maple Leafs 5 at Brantford Motts Clamatos 10
  - Saturday April 25 – Nelson Maple Leafs 1 at Brantford Motts Clamatos 5
  - Sunday April 26 – Nelson Maple Leafs 3 at Brantford Motts Clamatos 6
  - Monday April 27 – Nelson Maple Leafs 6 at Brantford Motts Clamatos 7 (double overtime)

1986–87 – Bolton Cup Champions

- at Brantford, Brantford Motts Clamatos defeat the St. John's Caps 4-2
  - Monday April 13 - St. John's Caps 4 at Brantford Motts Clamatos 8
  - Wednesday April 15 - St. John's Caps 2 at Brantford Motts Clamatos 4
  - Thursday April 16 - St. John's Caps 2 at Brantford Motts Clamatos 3 (double overtime)
