= Dundas Real McCoys =

Canadian senior ice hockey team

- City: Dundas, Ontario
- League: Niagara Int. "A"; 1964–1979; Georgian Bay Int. "A"; 1979–1980; OHA Senior "A"; 1980–1987; Allan Cup Hockey League; 2000–present
- Home arena: J.L. Grightmire Arena
- Colours: Cardinal red Black; Gold
- Head coach: Ron Bernacci
- Website: realmccoys.ca

Franchise history
- 1964–1981: Dundas Merchants
- 1981–1985: Dundas-Hamilton Tigers
- 1985–1988: Dundas Real McCoys
- 2000–present: Dundas Real McCoys

The Dundas Real McCoys are a Canadian senior ice hockey team based in Dundas, Ontario. They play in the Ontario Hockey Association's Allan Cup Hockey.

The Real McCoys have won four National Championships, winning the 1986 Hardy Cup as Canadian Senior "AA" champions and hosting and winning the 2014 Allan Cup, 2023 Allan Cup and 2024 Allan Cup as Canadian Senior "AAA" champions.

== History ==
The Real McCoys were once members of the Major Intermediate A Hockey League as the Dundas Merchants, and as the Dundas-Hamilton Tigers. The Tigers won the J. Ross Robertson Cup in 1985 as the league's playoffs champions.

In 1986, the Real McCoys were the last Ontario Hockey Association team to win the Hardy Cup as National Senior "AA"/Intermediate "A" Champions. Only two OHA teams ever won this award, the other was the Georgetown Raiders. The Real McCoys played one year independent after the OHA Sr. League folded in 1987. After faltering in the first round of the national playoffs in 1988, the McCoys folded.

In 2000, the Real McCoys were resurrected in Major League Hockey and have played there ever since. The Real McCoys won the J. Ross Robertson Cup as playoffs champions in 2002, 2003, 2009, 2010, 2011 and 2012.

== Season-by-season record ==
Note: GP = Games played, W = Wins, L = Losses, T = Ties, OTL = Overtime losses, Pts = Points, GF = Goals for, GA = Goals against

Season	GP	W	L	T	OTL	GF	GA	P	Results	Playoffs
1978-79	34	21	12	1	-	204	144	43	2nd NIAHL	
1979-80	36	24	12	0	-	229	161	48	1st GBIAHL	Won league
1980-81	35	20	14	1	-	194	174	41	3rd OHA Sr. A	
1981-82	34	13	21	0	-	201	205	26	5th OHA Sr. A	
1982-83	37	16	20	1	-	186	214	33	3rd OHA Sr. A	
1984-85	40	22	17	1	-	224	193	45	OHA Sr. A	Won league
1985-86	36	20	15	1	-	158	163	41	4th OHA Sr. A	Lost final
1986-87	35	15	19	1	-	160	154	33	2nd OHA Sr. A	Lost final
1987-00	Did not participate									
2000-01	30	23	7	0	0	--	--	46	4th OHA Sr. A	
2001-02	32	26	6	0	0	269	109	52	2nd OHA Sr. A	Won league
2002-03	32	19	9	2	2	167	118	42	2nd MLH	Won league
2003-04	32	2	29	0	1	99	204	5	6th MLH	
2004-05	34	20	12	0	2	198	167	42	2nd MLH	Lost final
2005-06	30	15	12	0	3	147	148	33	3rd MLH	Won league
2006-07	30	11	11	-	8	157	172	30	5th MLH	DNQ
2007-08	30	21	7	-	2	148	120	44	1st MLH	Won league
2008-09	28	19	7	-	2	161	120	40	1st MLH	Won league
2009-10	24	19	3	-	2	149	88	40	1st MLH	Won league
2010-11	24	11	9	-	4	122	119	26	3rd MLH	Won league
2011-12	28	15	6	-	7	179	142	37	2nd ACH	Won league
2012-13	24	13	11	-	0	122	119	26	3rd ACH	Won league
2013-14	24	18	4	-	2	136	78	38	1st ACH	Lost final, won Allan Cup
2014-15	24	10	13	-	1	101	139	21	4th ACH	Won league
2015-16	24	7	16	-	1	93	141	19	6th ACH	Lost semi-final

== Notable alumni ==
- Matthew Barnaby
- Ryan Christie
- Dan Currie
- Bruce Dowie
- Todd Harvey
- Todd Hlushko
- Mark Jooris
- Mike Kennedy
- Bob LaForest
- Jeff MacMillan
- Bill McDougall
- Mike Millar
- Chris Pusey
- Nick Smith
- Rick Vaive
- Scott Walker
- Stan Weir
- Jason Williams
