= Durham Huskies =

- City: Durham, Ontario
- League: Various Senior Leagues
- Operated: Circa 1908-1992
- Home arena: Durham Community Centre
- Colours: Blue, Red, and White
- Head coach: Royden Burnett, Irvie Elvidge, Andy Grant, Sr., Mike Murrell, Jim Nixon, Sr.

Franchise history
- 1920-1952: Durham Hockey Club
- 1952-1992: Durham Huskies

The Durham Huskies were an ice hockey franchise based in the town of Durham, Ontario, Canada. The team is actually a series of teams that have spanned nine decades and through an uncountable series of leagues. The Huskies have existed under of couple short lived monikers before finding their name by accident in the 1950s. This team has spanned the Junior, Intermediate, and Senior levels of Ontario hockey.

== The beginnings ==
Founded around 1920, the Durham Hockey Club participated in the Ontario Hockey Association Intermediate League. The league was divided into numerous small divisions in which each club would have two home-and-homes with. The team with the top record after this round robin moved on to the provincial playdowns.

Their inaugural season, 1920–21, had the Durham Hockey Club competing against Markdale, Owen Sound, and Wiarton in OHA Group 14 of the Intermediate division. The season would end with the Club earning their historic first victory but still finishing last tied with Owen Sound.

As members of Intermediate Group 16, the 1928-29 Durham Hockey Club competed against Markdale and Flesherton. In their four-game schedule, the Club went undefeated. In the first round of the playoffs they met Walkerton who beat them 7-6 and 5–2 to win the series 12-goals-to-8. In 1930–31, the club was moved into a division with Walkerton and Owen Sound, still referred to as Group 16. Durham had one win and three losses and was eliminated from playoff contention. At the same, Durham's junior team won the Northern Hockey League's junior hockey championship.

In these infantile years, many OHA clubs played a second season after the OHA season was done. This season was played under the league name: the Northern Hockey League. The Durham Hockey Club played in both leagues.

1935-36 marked the year that the Durham Hockey Club won its first ever Senior OHA Championship. Coached by Dr. Royden Burnett, this team went the distance and took home the last championship this organization would see until the 1950s.

== The 1950s and 1960s ==
During the 1951–52 season, the Durham Hockey Club was competing in the Western Ontario Hockey Association Intermediate "A" League. The club was dominant, but a reporter from the town's local paper, The Chronicle, felt the team was missing a name. He attempted to give them names like the "Hornets" and the "Phantoms", but nothing stuck. Possibly by mistake, near the end of the 1952 playoff run, The Chronicle ran an article calling the club the "Huskies". The name stuck and the team won its first championship in over a decade. The team repeated their championship run in the 1952–53 season, but at the senior level, again fell dormant. The Intermediate Huskies took over from there, winning the OHA "B" championship in 1953-54 and 1955–56. After the success of the early 1950s, even the Intermediates fell off the map for a short while. It took until the 1967–68 season for the Intermediates to win the OHA again. The Huskies repeated the next year, and then disappeared from the history books.

== Senior A years ==
In 1971, after being very dominant at the Intermediate B level as members of the Central League, the Huskies jumped up to the newly formed Georgian Bay Intermediate A League for one season. In that one season, they won the league and lost the OHA Intermediate A final to the Georgetown Raiders.

In 1972, the Huskies jumped to the new Western Senior B League which became the Continental Senior B league in 1973 and jumped up to Senior "A" in 1975. Durham won the Continental crown in Senior "B" 1973-74 and Senior "A" in 1975–76. The Huskies won the 1974 title by defeating the Stratford Perths 4-games-to-2 in the league and provincial final. Two years later, the Huskies advanced past their league championship to compete in the Allan Cup playdowns for the first time in their history. The Huskies were defeated by the Barrie Flyers 4-games-to-none in the J. Ross Robertson Cup series for the Ontario Hockey Association title. Barrie made it all the way to the Allan Cup final where they were defeated 4-games-to-none by the Spokane Flyers. They Huskies found a great rivalry in the Continent league with the Lucan-Ilderton Jets and the Stratford Perths.

In 1980, the Continental League became the OHA Senior A Hockey League. The Huskies stayed for two seasons as the league filled with teams from the Continental League's more Toronto-based rival. In 1982, the Huskies left the league in favour of a more local competitive base and more affordable players. President of the Huskies, Steve Morris, claimed that the paying of players under the table was the biggest problem and why they had to get out.

== The final years ==
In 1982, the Huskies joined the Major Intermediate A Hockey League. For the first time, the Huskies would compete for the Hardy Cup and the league was fairly local with some teams as close as the Owen Sound Greys and Collingwood Shipbuilders. The new level would prove too challenging for the Huskies and they would finish last in the league.

In 1983, the Huskies jumped down to the even more local Northern Intermediate B Hockey League with neighbouring franchises like the Shelburne Muskies, Tavistock Royals, Kincardine Kings, and Port Elgin Suns. The Huskies would find their niche, winning three straight league titles and the 1985 Paxton Cup as OHA Champions. That final season, most of the rival teams had fled to the WOAA Senior Hockey League for more local governance and better regulated refereeing, leaving only Durham and Shelburne to duke it out. To fill the season with games, the OHA told the two teams to integrate their season with exhibition games in the OHA Intermediate C Hockey League—these games resulted mostly in massive blowouts (19-3, 12–2, etc.) which kept Durham and Shelburne from truly becoming "battle hardened" for playoffs. This showed in the 1986 OHA Final when Durham forfeited a 2-games-to-none and 3-games-to-2 series lead to the Dunnville Mudcats to lose the series.

The summer of 1986 saw restructuring. The Northern League and OHA Intermediate C League, combined with Collingwood fresh out of OHA Senior A, were reorganized into Georgian Bay Senior A and Senior B. This came at the end of the "Intermediate" era and happened 2–3 years after the rest of the country got rid of the designation. Durham and Collingwood dominated the Senior A league, with Durham winning the provincial Senior AA crown to move into the Hardy Cup playdowns and Collingwood winning the provincial Senior A crown. This structure faltered after one season as more teams defected to the WOAA in 1987 and Collingwood took a year off to build a new Junior B team (Collingwood Blues). The remaining teams were reorganized back into the Northern Senior B Hockey League and a new rival league called the Central Senior B Hockey League. Durham would compete in the Central for 1987-88 before returning to the Northern in 1988 for good.

In 1989, the Huskies would again win the OHA Senior AA crown and advance into the Hardy Cup playdowns. They also defeated the Almonte Centennials of the Ottawa District Hockey Association to win the Ontario/Quebec championship 3-games-to-1 in Durham. Their trail would end in the Eastern Canada final, in contention for the Col. J. Bourque Trophy against the Port-aux-Basques Mariners of Newfoundland and Labrador. Durham would be swept 3-games-to-none, but in the face of an opponent that was allowed to cherry-pick the top five players from their league to come play for them against Durham and a budget of near $400,000 compared to Durham's $20,000. This was Durham's last attempt at a national championship. This team was honoured in 2009 at the Hockey Day in Durham festival.

In 1990, their league was declared Senior A. The Huskies put together consistently good teams, but kept failing to win their league championship in the face of the Creemore Chiefs and Elora Rocks. In the summer of 1992, the Huskies declared themselves folded due to lack of interest.

== Season-by-season record ==
Note: GP = Games Played, W = Wins, L = Losses, T = Ties, OTL = Overtime Losses, GF = Goals for, GA = Goals against

Season	GP	W	L	T	GF	GA	Points	Finish	Playoffs
1920-21	6	1	5	0	17	61	2	4th Int. Gr. 14	
1926-27	4	3	1	0	8	6	6	1st Int. Gr. 18B	
1928-29	4	4	0	0	31	6	8	1st Int. Gr. 16	
1929-30	7	5	1	1	39	15	11	1st Int. Gr. 12B	
1930-31	4	1	3	0	8	18	2	3rd Int. Gr. 16	
1938-39	8	5	2	1	--	--	11	2nd Int. B Gr. 9	
1941-42	8	3	4	1	--	--	7	3rd Int. B Gr. 6	
1953-54	26	13	13	0	--	--	26	5th OHA Int. A	
1965-66	24	15	7	2	--	--	32	3rd WOAA North	Lost semi-final
1966-67	Statistics Missing								Lost OHA Int. B SF
1967-68	22	16	6	0	--	--	32	2nd Central Int. B	Won League, won OHA Int. B
1968-69	26	20	6	0	--	--	40	1st Central Int. B	Won League, won OHA Int. B
1969-70	24	19	5	0	--	--	38	1st Central Int. B	Lost final
1970-71	20	14	5	1	137	66	29	2nd Central Int. B	Won League, lost OHA Int. B Final
1971-72	16	12	4	0	101	60	24	1st Georgian Bay Int. A	Won League, 4-3 (Midland); Lost OHA Final, 0-4 (North Halton)
1972-73	33	21	11	1	160	135	43	3rd WSBHL	
1973-74	30	22	8	0	148	107	44	2nd CSBHL	Won League
1974-75	34	15	17	2	163	151	32	5th CSBHL	
1975-76	40	28	10	2	215	140	58	1st CSAHL	Won League, lost OHA Final
1976-77	33	12	21	0	121	197	24	6th CSAHL	
1977-78	36	22	14	0	171	151	44	2nd CSAHL	
1978-79	39	21	16	2	208	171	44	3rd CSAHL	Lost quarter-final
1979-80	40	23	17	0	216	177	46	4th CSAHL	Lost semi-final
1980-81	36	20	15	1	206	187	41	4th OHA Sr. A	Lost quarter-final
1981-82	36	23	12	1	194	183	47	2nd OHA Sr. A	Lost quarter-final
1982-83	30	8	22	0	134	206	16	6th OHA Int. A	Lost Quarter-final, 2-4 (Port Elgin)
1983-84	18*	11	6	1	89	70	23	2nd Northern Int. B	Won League, lost OHA Final
1984-85	24	15	6	3	136	73	33	2nd Northern Int. B	Won Semi-final, 4-0 (Port Elgin); Won Final, 4-0 (Shelburne); Won OHA Final, 4-1 (Dunnville)
1985-86	6^{†}	3	1	2	34	24	8	1st Northern Int. B	Won Final, 4-2 (Shelburne); Lost OHA Final, 3-4 (Dunnville)
1986-87	23	19	3	1	232	94	39	1st Georgian Bay Sr. A	Won Semi-final, 4-1 (Shelburne); Lost Final, 1-4 (Collingwood); Won OHA Sr. AA SF, 2-0 (Elora); Won OHA Sr. AA Final, 2-1 (Dresden); Lost Eastern Canada SF, 1-3 (Smiths Falls)
1987-88	25	16	6	3	144	105	34	2nd Central Sr. B	Won Quarter-final, 3-1 (Tavistock); Won Semi-final, 3-1 (Elora); Lost Final, 0-4 (Exeter)
1988-89	25	16	7	2	155	113	34	1st Central Sr. A-North	Won Quarter-final, 4-0 (Shelburne); Lost Semi-final, 3-4 (Creemore); Won OHA Sr. AA SF, 2-1 (Exeter); Won OHA Sr. AA Final, 3-0 (Mooretown); Won Eastern Canada SF, 3-1 (Almonte); Lost Eastern Canada Final, 0-3 (Port-aux-Basques)
1989-90	27	18	7	2	170	94	38	3rd Northern Sr. A	Lost Semi-final, 3-4 (Harriston)
1990-91	24	14	7	3	135	86	31	2nd Northern Sr. A	Lost Semi-final, 2-4 (Elora)
1991-92	24	16	4	4	133	81	36	1st Northern Sr. A	Won Semi-final, 4-0 (Creemore); Lost Final, 2-4 (Elora)

(*) denotes that the results of the final 6 games of the 1983-84 season are currently missing.

(†) denotes 2 teams in league, rest of schedule filled with exhibition vs. Int. C teams.

== List of championships ==
A note of interest: the Intermediate level was abolished in the late 1980s as the entire Senior and Intermediate system fell apart. Since then, the Ontario Hockey Association has rewritten the accolades of championship Intermediate level teams to read as Senior level championships. As well, the championship tiers were revised from two classifications with three tiers each (Sr. A, B, C and Int. A, B, C) to one classification with four tiers (Sr. AAA, AA, A, and B) instead. As an example, instead of the Huskies being OHA Intermediate "C" champions in 1985, the OHA now considers them the OHA Senior "A" Champions. The list below is written as close to the original championship classification and tier as possible.

Pre-"Huskies" era

- 1930-31 Northern Hockey League Junior Champions
- 1935-36 OHA Senior Champions

"Huskies" era

- 1951-52 WOAA Intermediate Grand Champions
- 1952-53 WOAA Intermediate Grand Champions
- 1953-54 OHA Intermediate "B" Champions
- 1955-56 OHA Intermediate "B" Champions
- 1964-65 WOAA Major Intermediate "C" Champions
- 1967-68 Central Intermediate "B" Champions
- 1967-68 OHA Intermediate "B" Champions
- 1968-69 Central Intermediate "B" Champions
- 1968-69 OHA Intermediate "B" Champions
- 1970-71 Southern Counties Intermediate "B" Champions
- 1971-72 League Intermediate "A" Champions
- 1973-74 Continental Senior "B" Champions
- 1973-74 OHA Senior "B" Champions
- 1975-76 Continental Senior "A" Champions
- 1983-84 Northern Intermediate "B" Champions
- 1984-85 Northern Intermediate "B" Champions
- 1984-85 OHA Intermediate "B" Champions
- 1985-86 Northern Intermediate "B" Champions
- 1986-87 Georgian Bay Senior "A" Regular Season & Ontario Hardy Cup Champions
- 1988-89 Central Senior "B" Regular Season, OHA, & All-Ontario Hardy Cup Champions

Runner up: 1952-53 OHA Intermediate "B", 1970-71 OHA Intermediate "B", 1971-72 OHA Intermediate "A", 1975-76 Ontario Allan Cup Finalists, 1983-84 OHA Intermediate "B", 1985-86 OHA Intermediate "B".

== National Hockey League alumni ==
- Dean Hopkins
- Stan Long
- Jim Roberts
