= 1951 Allan Cup =

Canadian senior ice hockey championship

The Allan Cup trophy

The 1951 Allan Cup was the Canadian senior ice hockey championship for the 1950–51 senior "A" season. The event was hosted by the Owen Sound Mercurys and Owen Sound, Ontario. The 1951 playoff marked the 43rd time that the Allan Cup has been awarded.

== Teams ==
- Owen Sound Mercurys (Eastern Canadian Champions)
- Fort Frances Canadians (Western Canadian Champions)

== Playdowns ==
=== Allan Cup Best-of-Seven Series ===
Owen Sound Mercurys defeated Fort Frances Canadians 4-games-to-3

Owen Sound Mercurys 4 - Fort Frances Canadians 3
Fort Frances Canadians 6 - Owen Sound Mercurys 4
Owen Sound Mercurys 4 - Fort Frances Canadians 2
Fort Frances Canadians 4 - Owen Sound Mercurys 2
Fort Frances Canadians 6 - Owen Sound Mercurys 5 (OT)
Owen Sound Mercurys 7 - Fort Frances Canadians 4
Owen Sound Mercurys 3 - Fort Frances Canadians 1

=== Eastern Playdowns ===
Quarter-final

Dolbeau Castors defeated St. Francis Xavier X-Men 3-games-to-1

St. Francis Xavier Xmen 8 - Dolbeau Castors 5
Dolbeau Castors 3 - St. Francis Xavier Xmen 2
Dolbeau Castors 13 - St. Francis Xavier Xmen 3
Dolbeau Castors 6 - St. Francis Xavier Xmen 2

Semi-final

Owen Sound Mercurys defeated Sault Ste. Marie Greyhounds 3-games-to-2

Sault Ste. Marie Greyhounds beat Owen Sound Mercurys
Sault Ste. Marie Greyhounds 4 - Owen Sound Mercurys 2
Owen Sound Mercurys 7 - Sault Ste. Marie Greyhounds 2
Owen Sound Mercurys 4 - Sault Ste. Marie Greyhounds 3
Owen Sound Mercurys 10 - Sault Ste. Marie Greyhounds 5

Dolbeau Castors defeated Smiths Falls Rideaus 3-games-to-2

Dolbeau Castors 12 - Smiths Falls Rideaus 5
Dolbeau Castors 7 - Smiths Falls Rideaus 3
Smiths Falls Rideaus 7 - Dolbeau Castors 4
Smiths Falls Rideaus 3 - Dolbeau Castors 2
Dolbeau Castors 8 - Smiths Falls Rideaus 3

Final

Owen Sound Mercurys defeated Dolbeau Castors 3-games-to-1

Owen Sound Mercurys 9 - Dolbeau Castors 4
Owen Sound Mercurys 10 - Dolbeau Castors 1
Dolbeau Castors 10 - Owen Sound Mercurys 6
Owen Sound Mercurys 5 - Dolbeau Castors 2

=== Western Playdowns ===
Quarter-final

Edmonton Mercurys defeated Yorkton Legion 3-games-to-1

Yorkton Legion 5 - Edmonton Mercurys 2
Edmonton Mercurys 6 - Yorkton Legion 2
Edmonton Mercurys 7 - Yorkton Legion 6
Edmonton Mercurys 4 - Yorkton Legion 1

Semi-final

Nanaimo Clippers defeated Edmonton Mercurys 3-games-to-1

Edmonton Mercurys 6 - Nanaimo Clippers 4
Nanaimo Clippers 6 - Edmonton Mercurys 5
Nanaimo Clippers 5 - Edmonton Mercurys 0
Nanaimo Clippers 8 - Edmonton Mercurys 1

Fort Frances Canadians defeated Letellier Maple Leafs 3-games-to-none

Fort Frances Canadians 6 - Letellier Maple Leafs 4
Fort Frances Canadians 2 - Letellier Maple Leafs 0
Fort Frances Canadians 3 - Letellier Maple Leafs 2

Final

Fort Frances Canadians defeated Nanaimo Clippers 4-games-to-1

Fort Frances Canadians 7 - Nanaimo Clippers 2
Nanaimo Clippers 4 - Fort Frances Canadians 3
Fort Frances Canadians 6 - Nanaimo Clippers 3
Fort Frances Canadians 4 - Nanaimo Clippers 2
Fort Frances Canadians 11 - Nanaimo Clippers 5
