= Major Intermediate A Hockey League =

The Major Intermediate A Hockey League was an ice hockey league in Ontario, Canada, sanctioned by the Ontario Hockey Association. It existed from 1978 to 1983. Its champion was eligible to compete for the W.G. Hardy Trophy, emblematic of Canadian Intermediate A hockey supremacy.

Georgian Bay Intermediate A Hockey League 1978 - 1980
Niagara & District Intermediate A Hockey League 1964 - 1979
Major Intermediate A Hockey League 1980 - 1983

== History ==
The Georgian Bay Intermediate A Hockey League was founded in 1978. Its founding members were the Collingwood Shipbuilders, the Port Elgin Sunocos, the Owen Sound Greys and the Orangeville Cougars. Port Elgin had been part of the OHA Intermediate C loop and Owen Sound was returning to the ice after a one-year hiatus caused by the 1977 collapse of the Southern Ontario Junior A Hockey League.

Collingwood was the first regular season champion, finishing first with a 30-7-0 record, but Port Elgin won the inaugural playoff championship. The Sunocos placed second at 24-10-1 and beat the third-place Greys (14-22-1) in one semifinal series. Orangeville finished dead last at 2-32-0, was swept by Collingwood and folded. Port Elgin then defeated Collingwood 4-2 in the final series.

The Georgian Bay league played an interlocking schedule with the five teams of the Niagara District Intermediate A Hockey League—the Georgetown Raiders, the Dundas Merchants, the Thorold Athletics, Port Colborne and Fort Erie. The Niagara league was founded in 1964. In 1979-80 Georgetown and Dundas joined the Georgian Bay league, which also took in the Orillia Terriers and the Barrie Flyers from the OHA Senior A Hockey League. Dundas finished first in the standings and beat third-place Georgetown 3-1 in a best-of-five playoff final. Collingwood was second, Orillia was fourth, Barrie was fifth, Port Elgin dropped to sixth and Owen Sound finished seventh.

In 1980-81 the league changed its name to Major Intermediate A as it had fully absorbed the Niagara league which floundered around 1979. Dundas departed for Senior A but the Midland Athletics were added. The order of finish was Georgetown, Collingwood, Owen Sound, Orillia, Barrie, Port Elgin and Midland. The Raiders ended up as playoff champions, defeating the Greys 4-1 in a best-of-seven final.

The same seven teams returned in 1981–82, although Port Elgin changed its nickname to the Suns, and Georgetown and Collingwood again captured the top two places in the standings. Port Elgin, Orillia, Midland, Owen Sound and Barrie rounded out the league. Georgetown swept the playoffs, beating the Shipbuilders 4-0 in the final, and went on to win the Hardy Cup as Canadian champions.

Owen Sound and Orillia departed prior to the 1982–83 season but the Durham Huskies entered from Senior A. Unfortunately, they were overmatched and finished in sixth and last place, behind Georgetown, Collingwood, Port Elgin, Midland and Barrie. Although the Raiders topped the standings for the third year in a row, Collingwood finally won the playoff championship by downing Georgetown 4-1 in the final.

The Major Intermediate A Hockey League folded in 1983. Midland disappeared with it while Port Elgin and Durham joined a local OHA Intermediate B loop. Collingwood, Georgetown and Barrie (now known as the Broncos) were absorbed into the Senior A league. Dundas and Owen Sound are the only teams that remain in existence today.

=== The Timmins Northstars ===
Despite the success and talent of the Major Intermediate A Hockey League, the Ontario Hockey Association had set a litmus test for the league's champions to determine whether or not they were capable of competing for the coveted Hardy Trophy. The litmus test in question was the Northern Ontario Hockey Association's only Intermediate team, the Timmins Northstars.

In 1980, the playoff champion Dundas Merchants got the first crack at the Northstars. In a best-of-three series, the Granites defeated the Merchants 2-games-to-1.

After the 1980–81 season, the champion Georgetown Raiders took their chances with Timmins. The Northstars made short work of the Raiders, defeating them 2-games-to-none. A year later, the Georgetown Raiders won their second straight league title and challenged the Timmins Northstars again. This time fate laid with the Raiders, as they won the series 2-games-to-1. The Raiders ended up moving on to win the 1982 Hardy Trophy.

In 1983, the Collingwood Shipbuilders won the Major Intermediate A Championship. They met the Northstars in the Ontario Hockey Association final but were defeated 2-games-to-none. This essentially marked the end of Intermediate "A" hockey in Ontario as the league merged with the OHA Senior A Hockey League before the beginning of the 1983–84 season.

== The teams ==
Team	Centre	Years	Notes
Barrie Flyers	Barrie	1979-83	Returned to the OHA Senior A Hockey League as the Broncos, folded in 1984
Collingwood Shipbuilders	Collingwood	1979-83	Moved to Senior A until 1987, moved up to OPJHL Jr. A in 1988
Dundas Merchants	Dundas	1979-80	Moved to Senior A, became the Dundas-Hamilton Tigers, now known as the Dundas Real McCoys
Durham Huskies	Durham	1982-83	Moved to Intermediate B, later Senior B and Senior AA, folded in 1992
Georgetown Raiders	Georgetown	1979-83	Moved to Senior A, folded in 1986, won league's only Hardy Cup
Midland Athletics	Midland	1980-83	Moved to Junior C
Orangeville Cougars	Orangeville	1978-79	Folded
Orillia Terriers	Orillia	1979-82	Folded
Owen Sound Greys	Owen Sound	1978-82	Merged with the Owen Sound Mercurys Junior B team, still exist today
Port Elgin Sunocos	Port Elgin	1978-83	Changed name to Suns in 1981, moved to Intermediate B, eventually folded

== Major Intermediate A Playoff Champions ==
- 1983 Collingwood Shipbuilders
- 1982 Georgetown Raiders
- 1981 Georgetown Raiders

=== Georgian Bay Champions ===
- 1980 Dundas Merchants
- 1979 Port Elgin Sunocos

=== OHA Champions ===
Prior to 1980, after 1934 realignment.

- 1979 Georgetown Raiders
- 1978 Dundas Merchants
- 1977 Georgetown Raiders
- 1976 Port Colborne Sailors
- 1975 Port Colborne Sailors
- 1974 Georgetown Raiders
- 1973 Georgetown Raiders
- 1972 Georgetown Raiders
- 1971 Brantford Foresters
- 1970 Port Colborne Sailors
- 1969 Port Colborne Sailors
- 1968 Kingston Merchants
- 1967 Fort Erie Frontiers
- 1966 Dundas Merchants
- 1965 Port Colborne Sailors
- 1964 Brantford
- 1963 Welland
- 1962 Port Colborne Sailors
- 1961 Port Colborne Sailors
- 1960 Napanee Comets
- 1959 Napanee Comets
- 1958 Napanee Comets
- 1957 Georgetown Raiders
- 1956 Sundridge Beavers
- 1955 Tillsonburg
- 1954 Elmira
- 1953 Simcoe
- 1952 Collingwood
- 1951 Collingwood
- 1950 Port Colborne
- 1949 Port Colborne
- 1948 Georgetown
- 1947 Brantford
- 1946 Kingston Locos
- 1945 Owen Sound
- 1944 St. Catharines Thompsons Products
- 1943 Aurora Army
- 1942 Sutton
- 1941 Midland
- 1940 Peterborough
- 1939 Collingwood
- 1938 Preston
- 1937 Trenton RCAF
- 1936 Oshawa
- 1935 Toronto Royals
