= 1973 Allan Cup =

Canadian senior ice hockey championship

The Allan Cup trophy

The 1973 Allan Cup was the Canadian senior ice hockey championship for the 1972–73 senior "A" season. The event was hosted by the Orillia Terriers and Orillia, Ontario. The 1973 playoff marked the 65th time that the Allan Cup has been awarded.

== Teams ==
- Orillia Terriers (Eastern Canadian Champions)
- St. Boniface Mohawks (Western Canadian Champions)

== Best-of-Seven Series ==
Orillia Terriers 12 - St. Boniface Mohawks 2
St. Boniface Mohawks 6 - Orillia Terriers 4
Orillia Terriers 8 - St. Boniface Mohawks 5
Orillia Terriers 11 - St. Boniface Mohawks 2
Orillia Terriers 8 - St. Boniface Mohawks 1
