= Fort Frances Canadians =

Canadian senior ice hockey team

The Fort Frances Canadians were a Canadian senior ice hockey team in the Northern Amateur League, from Fort Frances, Ontario. The team was organized following World War II, and led by player-coach Pat Wilson. Local radio station CKFI-AM broadcast games for the team.

The Canadians were finalists in the 1951 Allan Cup, and champions of the 1952 Allan Cup. Goaltender Ray Frederick, and defenceman Ed Kryzanowski, both played in the National Hockey League after being part of the Canadians.

The Fort Frances Canadians name was later used by the local minor ice hockey organization for its competitive youth teams.
