= St. Boniface Mohawks =

Canadian senior ice hockey team

The St. Boniface Mohawks were a Canadian senior ice hockey team in Winnipeg, Manitoba. The team was founded in 1967 when the Winnipeg Maroons, former Allan Cup champions, relocated to St. Boniface. The Mohawks played in various leagues, including the Manitoba Senior Hockey League and the Central Amateur Senior Hockey League, until the early 1990s.

During their existence, the Mohawks won a total of 14 Pattison Cups as provincial champions. Between 1968 and 1983, they won four Patton Cups as Western Canadian champions, but were never able to defeat their Eastern counterpart in the best-of-seven series for the Allan Cup. They were also runner-up at the 1989 and 1994 Allan Cups, after the national championship was changed to a round robin format.

During the 1975 Allan Cup playoffs, the Mohawks were awarded the first round series by default of the Thunder Bay Twins who had scheduling conflicts with their United States Hockey League playoffs. When the Mohawks appealed for reconsideration, the Twins entered the Allan Cup playoffs upon the conclusion of the USHL playoffs and won the series versus the Mohawks.

Pattison Cups (Provincial senior championships)

- 1968, 1970, 1971, 1972, 1973, 1974, 1975, 1976, 1980, 1981, 1982, 1983, 1986, 1989

Patton Cups (Western Canada senior championships)

- 1968, 1973, 1981, 1983
