= Hardy Cup (ice hockey) =

Canadian national ice hockey championship

- Sport: Ice hockey
- Awarded for: Senior "AA"/Intermediate national ice hockey championship
- Country: Canada

History
- First award: 1967
- Final award: 1990

The W. G. Hardy Trophy, more commonly referred to as the Hardy Cup, was the Canadian national Intermediate "A" ice hockey championship from 1967 until 1984, and the Canadian national senior championship for Senior "AA" from 1985 until 1990. The Hardy Cup was named for W. G. Hardy, and it was retired to the Hockey Hall of Fame in 1990.

== History ==
The Canadian Amateur Hockey Association established the W. G. Hardy Trophy in 1968, which became known as the Hardy Cup. It was awarded to the national champion of the intermediate senior division. From 1984 onward, the trophy was awarded to the Senior AA division champions of Canada, after senior and intermediate hockey were merged. The trophy was donated by a group of realtors from North Battleford, and retired from competition in 1990.

Until the 1967-68 season, the Intermediate level had many regional championships. The most prominent was for the Edmonton Journal Trophy, the Western Canadian Intermediate "A" Crown. In Ontario, the Intermediate champions were sometimes included in Allan Cup Senior "A" playoffs. Senior "AA" was unsustainable at the national level and the trophy was retired soon after.

== Champions ==
Hardy Cup finals
Year	Col. J. Bourque Trophy; Eastern Canada champions	Edmonton Journal Trophy; Western Canada champions	Series	Location
1968	Mineurs de Sept-Iles	Meadow Lake Stampeders	3-1	North Battleford, Saskatchewan
1969	Loups de La Tuque	Lloydminster Border Kings	3-0	La Tuque, Quebec
1970	Olympiques de Val D'Or	Powell River Regals	2-3	Powell River, British Columbia
1971	Bathurst Alpine Papermakers	Rosetown Red Wings	3-0	Bathurst, New Brunswick
1972	Campbellton Tigers	Rosetown Red Wings	3-2	Rosetown, Saskatchewan
1973	Saint John Mooseheads	Rosetown Red Wings	3-1	Saint John, New Brunswick
1974	Embrun Panthers	Warroad Lakers	0-3	Warroad, Minnesota
1975	Moncton Beavers	Thompson Hawks	3-1	Moncton, New Brunswick
1976	Embrun Panthers	Prince George Mohawks	3-2	Prince George, British Columbia
1977	Campbellton Tigers	Warroad Lakers	3-1	Campbellton, New Brunswick
1978	Campbellton Tigers	Prince George Mohawks	1-3	Prince George, British Columbia
1979	Moncton Hawks	Quesnel Kangaroos	3-0	Moncton, New Brunswick
1980	Fredericton Capitals	Burnaby Lakers	0-3	Vancouver, British Columbia
1981	Charlottetown Islanders	Winnipeg North End Flyers	3-0	Winnipeg, Manitoba
1982	Georgetown Raiders	Quesnel Kangaroos	3-0	Georgetown, Ontario
1983	Timmins North Stars	Winnipeg North End Flyers	0-4	Winnipeg, Manitoba
1984	Charlottetown Islanders	Moose Jaw Generals	4-1	Charlottetown, Prince Edward Island
1985	Charlottetown Islanders	Moose Jaw Generals	0-4	Moose Jaw, Saskatchewan
1986	Dundas Real McCoys	Lloydminster Border Kings	4-0	Dundas, Ontario
1987	Miramichi Packers	Stony Plain Eagles	3-0	Miramichi, New Brunswick
1988	Cambellton Tigers	Quesnel Kangaroos	4-0	Campbellton, New Brunswick
1989	Port-aux-Basques Mariners	Kindersley Klippers	4-1	Port-aux-Basques, Newfoundland
1990	Dartmouth Mounties	Paul Band Black Hawks	4-3	Stony Plain, Alberta

== Championships by location ==
This is a list of champions by province, territory, or state. From 1968, the Hardy Cup was awarded 23 times.

Hardy Cups by location
Rank	Region	Events hosted	Final berths	Championships
1	New Brunswick	7	10	8
2	British Columbia	4	7	3
-	Ontario	2	5	3
4	Prince Edward Island	1	3	2
-	Quebec	1	3	2
6	Manitoba	2	3	1
-	Minnesota	1	2	1
-	Newfoundland and Labrador	1	1	1
-	Nova Scotia	0	1	1
-	Saskatchewan	3	8	1
11	Alberta	1	3	0
