= Gord Renwick =

Canadian ice hockey administrator (1935–2021)

- Born: February 13, 1935; Galt, Ontario, Canada
- Died: January 6, 2021 (aged 85); Cambridge, Ontario, Canada
- Occupation(s): Ice hockey administrator and businessman
- Known for: Canadian Amateur Hockey Association president, International Ice Hockey Federation vice-president, Galt Hornets president
- Awards: Order of Hockey in Canada; IIHF Hall of Fame
- Honours: Renwick Cup

Gordon Ralph Renwick (February 13, 1935 – January 6, 2021) was a Canadian ice hockey administrator, who served as president of the Canadian Amateur Hockey Association (CAHA), vice-president of the International Ice Hockey Federation (IIHF), and was the team president of the Galt Hornets.

Renwick led the Hornets to Allan Cup championships for senior ice hockey in 1969 and 1971. His travels to the Ahearne Cup in Europe led to him opening the door for European teams playing tournaments in North America, and his role as a Chef de Mission for these events. Renwick was the founding chairman of the Wrigley Cup hockey tournament for midget age group in 1974, and then became vice-president of the CAHA in 1975. He served as president of the CAHA from 1977 to 1979, during a time when the CAHA battled with the World Hockey Association over junior ice hockey players, and struggled with Hockey Canada and the Government of Canada, for control of international hockey. During his time as president, the CAHA began the process of recognizing women's ice hockey in Canada, and implemented rules for mandatory safety equipment for youths. Renwick was the last elected president of the CAHA, which transitioned to having a full-time president in 1979.

Renwick later served eight years as vice-president of the IIHF, implementing bookkeeping and accounting reforms, and was responsible for marketing and sponsorship of international events including the Canada Cup, and the World Cup of Hockey. He also served as the chairman of the IIHF committees for rules, by-laws and statutes, and helped negotiate National Hockey League involvement in the Winter Olympic Games. He was inducted into the IIHF Hall of Fame in 2002, received the Order of Hockey in Canada in 2012, and is the namesake of the Renwick Cup.

== Early life ==
Gordon Ralph Renwick was born on February 13, 1935, in Galt, Ontario, the eldest of three children to Donald and Daisy Renwick. He was an aspiring baseball pitcher while attending the Galt Collegiate Institute and Vocational School. During a summer baseball camp in his junior year, he was nervous pitching to former major league player Goody Rosen, and hit Rosen in the elbow with a wild pitch.

== Galt Hornets ==
The Allan Cup was the championship trophy for amateur senior ice hockey in Canada.

Renwick served as president of the Galt Hornets team from 1966 to 1973, which won two Allan Cups for the senior ice hockey championship of Canada. He was encouraged to revive the team's ownership group by close friend, and the team's previous coach Bill Wylie. In 1966, Renwick named Earl Balfour as the team's new playing coach, and signed Gary Collins.

Two seasons later, the 1968–69 Hornets team won 52 of 67 games played, and won the Ontario championship in a four-game sweep of the Barrie Flyers. In the national playoffs, Galt defeated the Gander Flyers in five games, then the Victoriaville Tigers in six games to reach the final. Galt captured the 1969 Allan Cup winning in four consecutive games over the Calgary Stampeders.

Renwick and the team executive used a share-the-wealth philosophy, where the players saw a proportion of the team's profits. Galt won another Ontario championship in the 1970–71 season, with the goaltending tandem of Harold Hurley and Ken Broderick. In the playoffs, Galt defeated the Barrie Flyers, Orillia Terriers, Sault Ste. Marie, Thunder Bay Twins, and the Grand Falls-Windsor Cataracts to reach the finals. Galt captured the 1971 Allan Cup winning in four consecutive games over the same Calgary team from 1969, and played to sellout crowds at the Galt Arena Gardens. The Hornets represented Canada at the 1971 Ahearne Cup in Stockholm, finishing in third place behind teams from Russia and Sweden.

== CAHA vice-president ==
1970s international tours...

It opened up the door, the opportunity for senior clubs right across Canada to go to Europe and play in tournaments and meet the guys.

—Gord Renwick, 2012

Renwick first joined the Canadian Amateur Hockey Association (CAHA) committee as a director in 1969. In May 1973, he was elected vice-president in charge of senior and intermediate hockey, and reelected to the same position in May 1974. After two years on the executive, he was acclaimed as the first vice-president in May 1975, and held the position for two years.

Renwick made connections with other European teams while his Galt Hornets travelled to international tournaments. He opened the door for European senior clubs to play series in North America at the same time the National Hockey League (NHL) and the World Hockey Association were beginning to sign European players, and also exposed sold out North American arenas to European teams. He served as the Chef de Mission for European club teams visiting North America during 1970s on exhibition tours. He also hosted an international senior hockey tournament in December 1972, involving his own Galt team, HC Dynamo Moscow from the Soviet Union, the Prague Selects from Czechoslovakia, Timrå IK from Sweden, and the Owen Sound Downtowners and Kingston Aces from Ontario.

Renwick organized the original Wrigley Cup in 1974, as the tournament chairman. The event was a national midget age group hockey tournament for the top 12 teams in Canada, with the winning team to earn a trip to the Soviet Union. He was also responsible for implementing the CAHA development programs for coaches, referees and managers, but struggled with appropriate funding. When the annual meeting in 1977 approved $523,000 for development, Renwick stated that the CAHA needed about $5 million to fully implement what it envisioned.

== CAHA president ==
=== First year ===
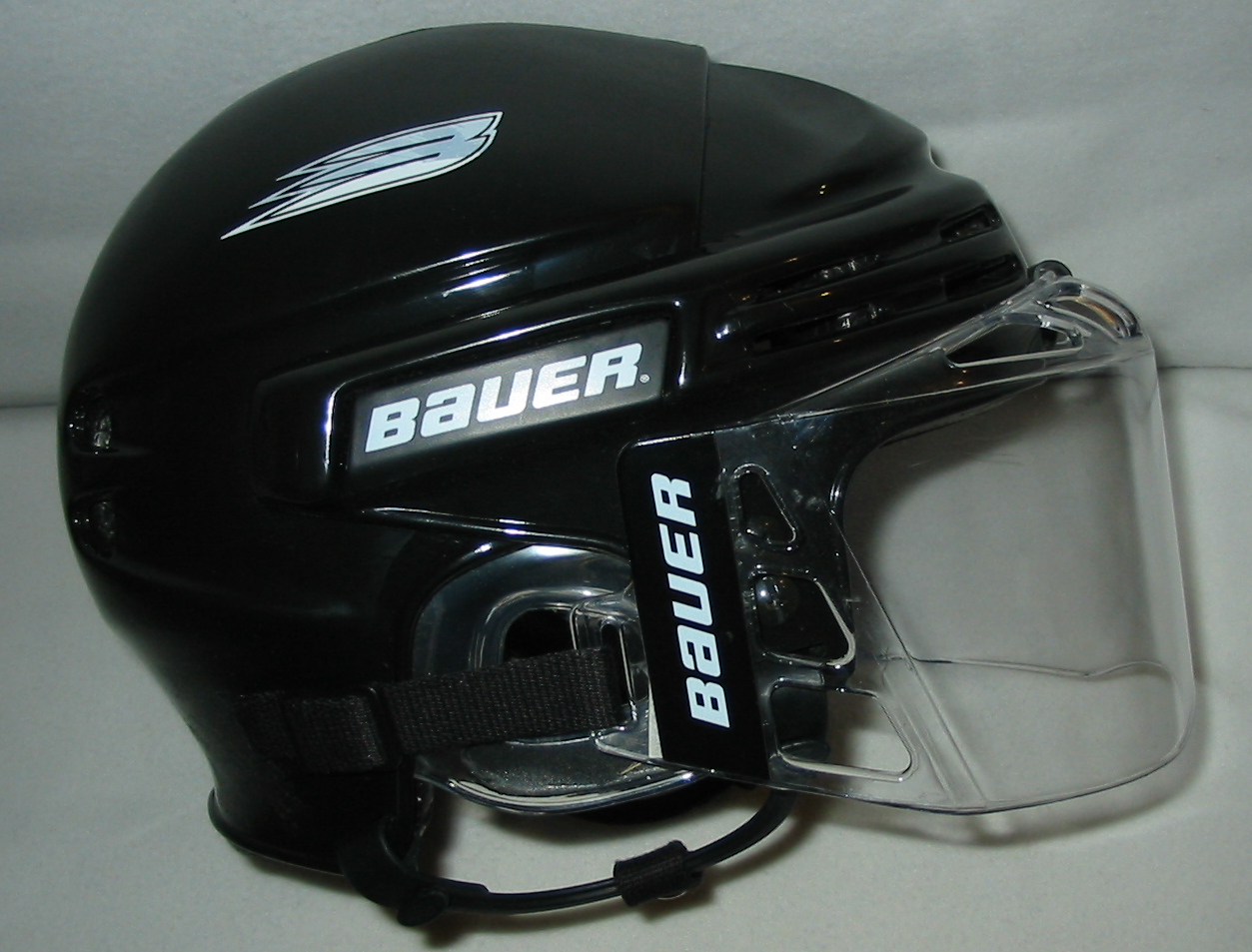
A typical ice hockey helmet with face guard worn by referees

Renwick was elected president of the CAHA on May 27, 1977, succeeding Don Johnson. His first order of business was to find a replacement for Gordon Juckes, who was retiring as the executive director of the CAHA. In June 1977, Renwick appointed David Branch as the new executive director of the CAHA effective September 1, 1977. The CAHA was also facing difficulties implementing its goals due to the cost of inflation and decreasing income. Renwick sought to repair relations with the NHL and the World Hockey Association (WHA), which the CAHA relied upon for income in the form of development fees for its junior ice hockey players signed to professional contracts. The CAHA had pending litigation against the professional leagues for unpaid fees, and Renwick felt that proposed NHL–WHA merger would only help the CAHA, which was caught in a power struggle between the two leagues.

The CAHA implemented several new rules and structural changes starting in 1977. In October, Renwick announced a workshop to determine the status of women's ice hockey in Canada, since the CAHA constitution restricted play to males. On May 25, 1978, the CAHA passed a resolution that set up a female hockey council, which allowed for female divisions within the CAHA, separate from the male divisions. The CAHA executive reviewed an application from the independent Manitoba Major Junior Hockey League to affiliate with the CAHA as a Junior A league, but the CAHA offered the league a Junior B status instead.

In March 1978, Renwick announced that by 1980, the CAHA would implement mandatory face masks on hockey helmets which met Canadian Standards Association (CSA) approval. The CAHA also faced differences between its provinces regarding mandatory helmets for ice hockey referees, and Renwick denied reports of cancelling the western portion of the 1978 Centennial Cup playoffs due to whether games were officiated by referees wearing helmets.

The CAHA and Hockey Canada were in competition with each other over control of hockey in Canada. Renwick said that dealing with Hockey Canada was the most unpleasant part of his role as the CAHA president. He was disappointed in the abilities of Doug Fisher as the chairman, and described Alan Eagleson as a dictator who wielded influence in the favour of professional players. Renwick looked to defend the amateur interests in Canada, and sought representation on the Hockey Canada committee which oversaw the 1978 World Junior Ice Hockey Championships. When Fisher insisted that the CAHA not be involved in international hockey, and accused the CAHA of being hostile towards the Hockey Canada mandate, Renwick called for Fisher's resignation. Renwick further denied that the CAHA was interfering in Hockey Canada's affairs, and actually supported Hockey Canada at meetings to approve the Canada Cup.

Canadian national team...

We feel the [Olympic] committee could be a CAHA committee rather than a Hockey Canada committee inasmuch as most of the people involved are affiliated with the CAHA.

—Gord Renwick, 1978

The CAHA's predicament worsened after a speech from the Minister of Amateur Sport, Iona Campagnolo, which confirmed Eagleson as Canada's sole negotiator for international competition. Renwick reiterated that Fisher should be removed, and that Eagleson should focus solely on professional hockey since he showed no interest in amateur issues. Renwick also expressed concerns that the Government of Canada had too much control on hockey in Canada, and that he was frustrated with Hockey Canada being in charge of the Canadian national team at the Winter Olympic Games, which was restricted to amateur participation. He felt that Hockey Canada should focus on trying to get the NHL and WHA to cooperate instead, and blamed Hockey Canada for the financial losses at the 1978 World Junior Ice Hockey Championships hosted in Canada.

=== Second year ===
Renwick was reelected by acclamation as CAHA president on May 25, 1978, and as the non-European representative on the International Ice Hockey Federation (IIHF) council on July 7, 1978. Renwick announced a five-year deal to rename the Wrigley Cup in July 1978, to become the Air Canada Cup for the national midget championship. He and Ed Chynoweth announced a series between Western Hockey League teams and a Russian Select team for December 1978.

Renwick expressed concerns about a proposal in November 1978 to have government appointees running youth hockey instead of volunteers. He considered volunteers to be the backbone of minor ice hockey in Canada, and felt they would lose the incentive to participate without having a say in how hockey operated. He also felt that there was little that the federal government of CAHA could do in preventing professional leagues from signing junior-aged players.

Accusations by the WHA...

These petty, ridiculous people, these amateur hockey people in Canada who have no idea what they're talking about—what they're conducting is a form of blackmail.

—Howard Baldwin, 1978

Renwick and the CAHA had a highly publicized dispute with WHA president Howard Baldwin in 1978, regarding the ongoing raiding of junior rosters in Canada, and the signing of junior-aged CAHA players without compensation. In October 1978, Renwick threatened to use the CAHA's leverage as an IIHF member, to block a series of WHA games versus international teams, unless the issue was resolved. A temporary truce was arranged where Renwick agreed not to block the WHA games, pending meeting set up with the WHA, Hockey Canada, and Iona Campagnolo. He claimed that the CAHA was owed $320,000 in development fees, which included a $150,000 bond signed by the WHA in November 1977, as a promise not to sign junior-aged players. Talks to resolve the issues broke down in November 1978, and Renwick informed the IIHF that the WHA was no longer in good standing with the CAHA, thus blocking the sanction of WHA international games by the IIHF.

The dispute with the WHA led to further disagreements with Hockey Canada in November 1978. Torrance Wylie was the new chairman of Hockey Canada, and he claimed that the CAHA had signed an agreement in July 1978 stating that Hockey Canada will sanction "all international and professional team involvements". Renwick disputed this by saying that such an agreement was tentative, and not approved by the CAHA executive board. Eagleson later threatened to cancel international events, because the CAHA had retained the power to veto international games with its IIHF membership. In January 1979, Hockey Canada sought to get its own seat on the IIHF council, and then later wanted to take over the CAHA's seat occupied by Renwick. He also refused to hand over the sanctioning approval to the IIHF executive itself, when Hockey Canada requested to bypass the CAHA. Later that month, when Lou Lefaive from Sport Canada said that Hockey Canada informed the government it would stop organizing teams for Olympics and World Championships, Renwick said the threat was an excuse for Eaglesons's inability to organize a profitable Canada Cup, and reiterated that the CAHA had supported the Hockey Canada endeavours.

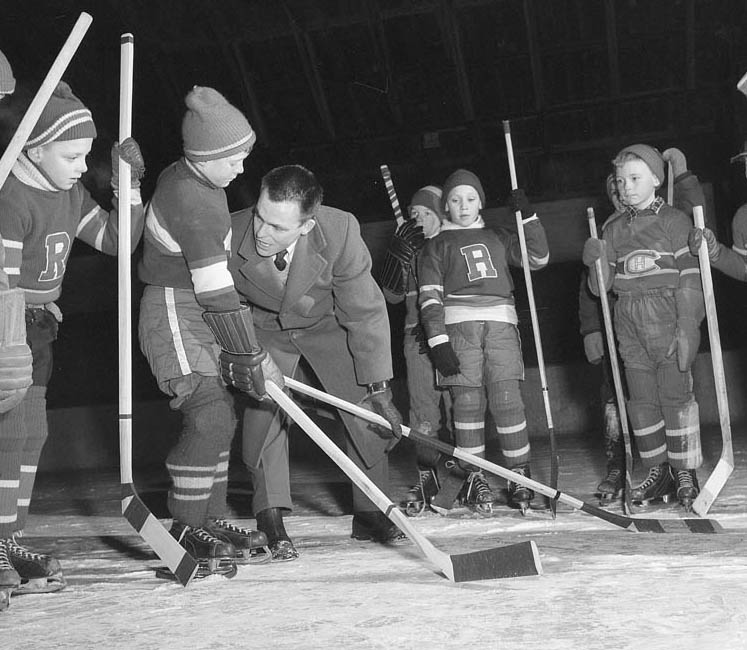
Minor ice hockey players learning body checking techniques

At the annual general meeting in May 1979, the CAHA responded to a government report critical of its player development program. Renwick was tired of the constant questioning of the CAHA by federal and provincial governments, but he put together a committee to examine the report in more detail. He also said that governments are quick to support the professional players, but give little help to amateurs and youths. The CAHA eliminated body checking in age levels below pee-wee; it sought stricter enforcement of player safety rules including high-sticking, illegal hockey sticks, and body checking; and it made CSA approved helmets and face masks mandatory by March 1, 1980. The CAHA allowed decided to allow advertising on the arena boards to help with income.

The Quebec Amateur Hockey Association (QAHA) threatened to leave the CAHA at the 1979 general meeting, citing "the lack of leadership of the national organization", and having its concerns and recommendations ignored by the CAHA. Renwick was surprised by the QAHA statement and criticism, and said that the QAHA has not nominated anyone to sit on the CAHA board, or take part in the technical committee. Also at the meeting, the CAHA unanimously chose to have a full-time paid president to look after affairs. The president would be responsible to an elected volunteer board of directors, and be assisted by the executive director. Renwick indicated that the CAHA would begin searching immediately to fill the position, and that neither he, nor CAHA vice-president Frank McKinnon would apply for the position.

== Post-presidency ==
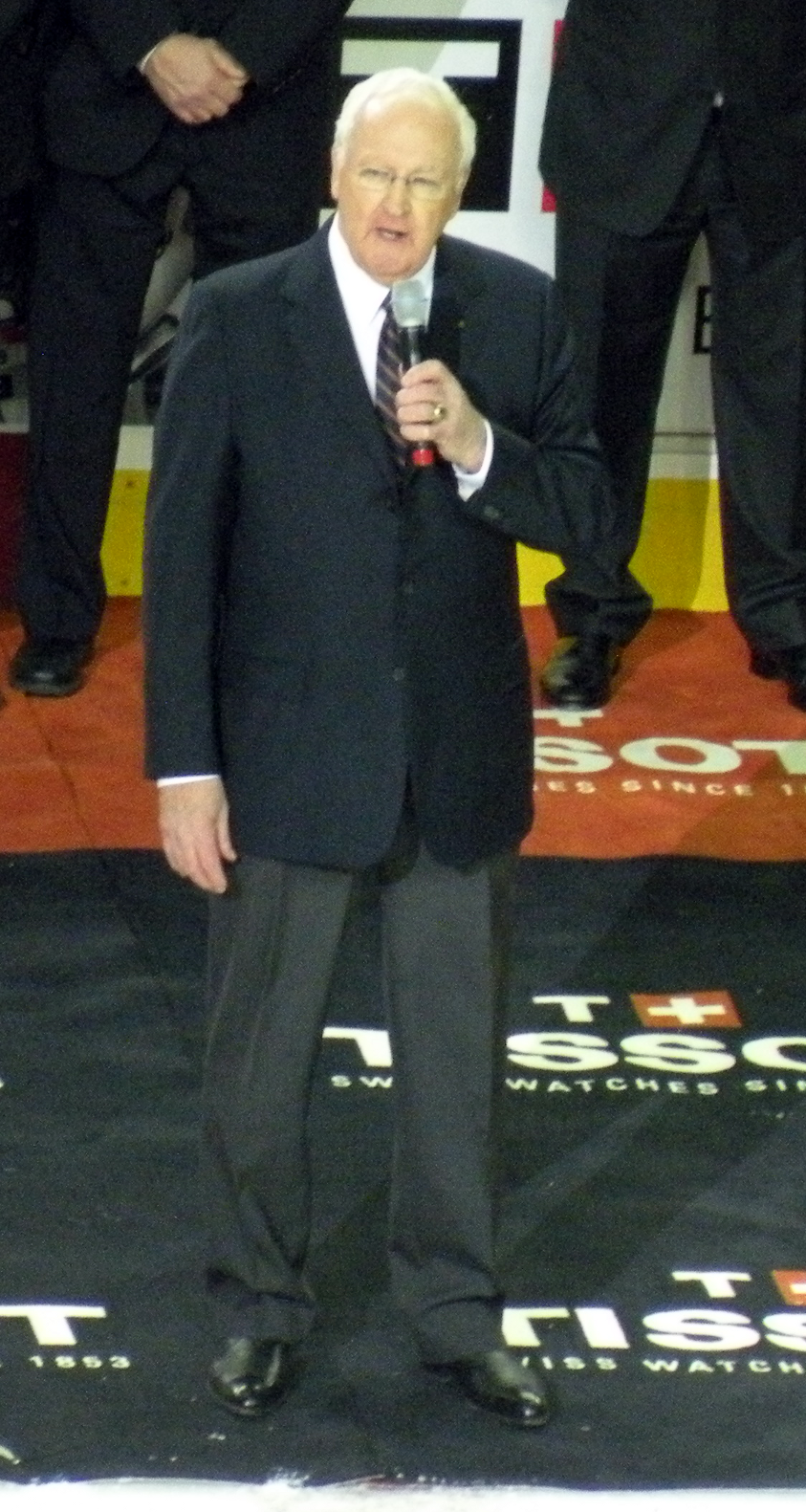
Murray Costello

Renwick was succeeded as CAHA president by Murray Costello, who served in a full-time capacity. Renwick returned to senior ice hockey, and served as president of the OHA Senior A Hockey League from 1979 to 1981. The CAHA later extended the ban of body checking to include the pee-wee age group, which Renwick had previously implemented. He later served on the CAHA's rules committee which made suggestions for the atom levels and younger in 1980. Suggestions included smaller ice surfaces, light-weight pucks, straighter hockey sticks, no slapshots, and eliminating face-offs on penalties by giving the puck to the non-offending team.

When the CAHA resurrected the Canadian national team in 1981, he said that previous efforts for the program were underfunded, hence being represented by club teams instead. In 1984, the Ontario Hockey Association (OHA) relocated to Cambridge, and became of tenant of Renwick Construction at 1425 Bishop Street. In April 1985, Renwick attended the funeral of Bunny Ahearne on behalf of Canada, and stated that while Canadians had their differences with Ahearne, he was respected for his efforts in international hockey.

== IIHF vice-president ==
World hockey politics...

I've always found it to be a little more interesting to be involved internationally. You are coming from so many different countries. That was kind of fun to watch that come together.

—Gord Renwick, 2012

Renwick served as an IIHF board member for twenty years, and was its vice-president from 1986 to 1994. As a board member in 1979, the IIHF followed his example in Canada, and required face masks on hockey helmets for players aged 16 and younger. Renwick then asked IIHF members to endorse approved masks in their respective youth hockey associations. As the vice-president, he streamlined the accounting process and oversaw the conversion of IIHF bookkeeping to a computerized system. He also arranged an external annual auditing contract for IIHF books. He was also responsible for marketing and sponsorship of international events including the Canada Cup, and the World Cup of Hockey.

Renwick served as the chairman of the IIHF committees for rules, by-laws and statutes to implement uniformity of hockey in North America and Europe. He utilized ice hockey referee clinics in Canada to identify quality referees to address the growing need for officials. He reiterated concerns for consistency in global enforcement of rules, and excessive on-ice violence experienced in the CAHA that came with the improved safety equipment, and players feeling invincible.

In February 1989, when Peter Nedved defected to Canada from Czechoslovakia, Renwick said that Nedved must be released from his home country according to IIHF statutes before he could play for Canada, unless there was a court order otherwise. When the schedule for the 1992 Men's World Ice Hockey Championships was moved further back in April due to ice hockey at the 1992 Winter Olympics, Renwick felt that it would benefit Team Canada due to more available players not in the 1992 Stanley Cup playoffs. The German Ice Hockey Federation protested the shootout win by Team Canada in the 1992 Winter Olympics due to a referee error, but the game result was upheld by the IIHF, and Renwick stated that the previous goal counted once the puck had been put back into play. In March 1994 after the Winter Olympics, Canada and Sweden made a proposal to the IIHF to eliminate the shootout, and Renwick felt that there would be opposition, and that "Europeans are pretty high on the shootout and they are used to it".

Renwick played an integral role in discussions between the NHL and the IIHF, that lead to NHL participation in the Winter Olympic Games. He worked with Gary Bettman of the NHL and National Hockey League Players' Association to have professionals in the Olympics, and also for NHL exhibition games in Europe, and to work out the international player transfer process. Renwick was cautious that lengthening the NHL season schedule to accommodate the Olympics would decrease the number of players available to participate in the Ice Hockey World Championships.

Renwick was the first declared candidate to replace Günther Sabetzki, who planned on retiring as IIHF president in 1994. Renwick was the preferred choice of the CAHA for the position, despite previous campaigning for the position by Eagleson. Journalist Alan Adams noted that despite Renwick being well respected behind-the-scenes work and loyalty to the game, Europeans would be unlikely to elect a Canadian as president, due to fears of NHL encroachment into Europe, and having a president geographically far away from the European market. He was defeated by René Fasel, in a vote described as a surprise by media in Canada. Renwick chose to retire from hockey, after his failed candidacy to be IIHF president.

== Personal life ==
Cambridge Sports Hall of Fame...

I probably get a lot more credit than I deserve. What stimulates me to do it is the love of the game and the success of marketing.

—Gord Renwick, 1997

Renwick was married twice and had five children. Renwick was the owner of Renwick Construction which constructed and managed residential and industrial properties in Cambridge. He took over the business after the death of his father in 1963.

Renwick's hobbies included his cottage on Lake Rosseau, sailing, and following the Toronto Blue Jays. He and his second wife Maggie were invited annually to attend the Ice Hockey World Championships, and he was good friends with Vladislav Tretiak.

Renwick died on January 6, 2021, in Cambridge.

== Honours and awards ==
Renwick Cup

Renwick was presented with the CAHA Volunteer of the Year Award also known as the meritorious award, after 10 years of service when his term as president expired in 1979. In 1991, he received the OHA Gold Stick, in recognition of contributions to hockey as a builder. He was made a life member of the IIHF in 1994, after he retired from international service.

Renwick was inducted into the Cambridge Sports Hall of Fame as an individual in 1997, and inducted a second time in 1998, as a member of the 1968–69 Galt Hornets team. He was inducted into IIHF Hall of Fame as a builder in 2002, and inducted into the Cambridge Sports Hall of Fame a third time in 2004, as a member of the 1970–71 Galt Hornets team.

Renwick was part of the inaugural class of the Order of Hockey in Canada in 2012. He received the order on June 25, 2012, along with fellow honourees Jean Béliveau, Cassie Campbell, Wayne Gretzky and Gordie Howe. Other recognition for the Order of Hockey in Canada included a customized plaque from Cambridge City Council and its mayor Doug Craig, and congratulations by Rob Leone in the Legislative Assembly of Ontario.

Renwick was also made a life member of Hockey Canada, and was inducted into the Waterloo Region Hall of Fame. He is also the namesake of the Renwick Cup, which is awarded annually to the AAA senior ice hockey champion of Ontario, who moves on to the Allan Cup.

In 2019, the Cambridge Memorial Hospital dedicated the Renwick family bridge in his honour, a glass structure connecting two wings of the hospital.
