= Parasports =

Sports adapted for players with a disability

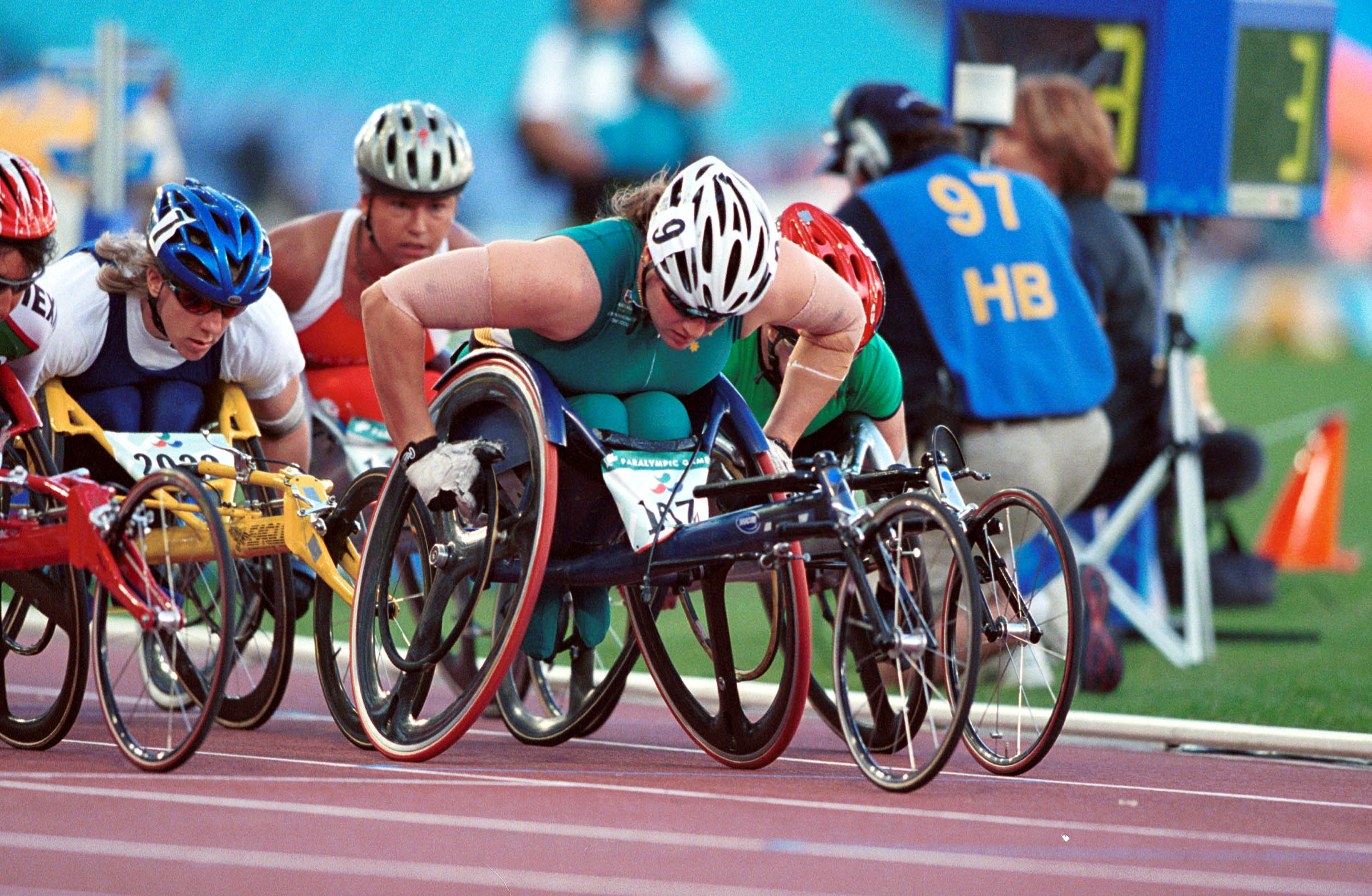
Wheelchair race in the 2000 Sydney Paralympic Games

Para sports refer only to sports that have been officially recognised and regulated by the International Paralympic Committee (IPC), the global governing body of the Paralympic Movement. Parasports include International Federations that are members of the IPC and feature on the Paralympic programme, and IPC Recognised International Federations – international federations that do not have sports on the Paralympic programme but which are recognised by the IPC.

The term “Para sports” is not an umbrella term for all disability sports; it is a proprietary term that the IPC uses to identify or refer to a specific subset of adaptive or disability sports in which persons with a disability participate in accordance with classification rules that are compliant with the IPC Classification Code.

Para sports are played by people with a disability, and currently include physical, vision and intellectual disabilities. Some Para sports are forms of adapted physical activities from existing sports for persons without disabilities, while others have been specifically created for persons with a disability and do not have an able-bodied equivalent. All, however, comply with the IPC Classification Code.

== Etymology ==
The IPC owns the intellectual property in and regulates the use of the Para prefix as an identifier for specific sporting disciplines, events, and related commercial activities. In this context, as of autumn of 2025, Para is used to identify 44 sports in which persons with a disability participate in accordance with classification rules that are compliant with the IPC Classification Code.

Use of the PARA prefix in conjunction with general or specific references to sporting or cultural events, particularly when used for commercial or promotional purposes, should be done only with prior written permission of the IPC and/or in accordance with applicable IPC directives.

== Sports ==
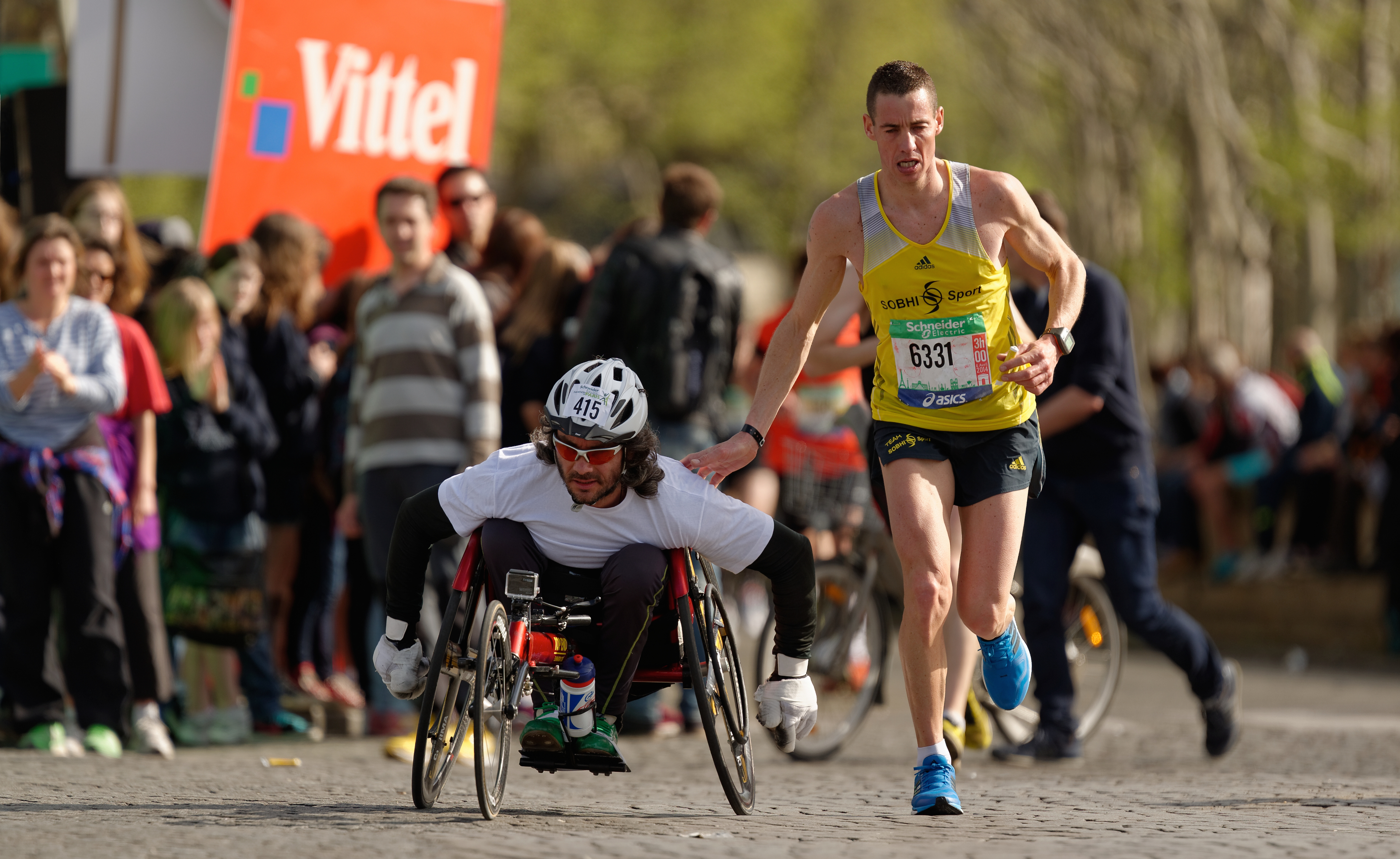
A wheelchair racer during the Marathon International de Paris (Paris Marathon) in 2014.

Wounded Warrior Chuck Sketch participates in swim practice on Feb. 14, 2012 at United States Marine Corps Base Camp Pendleton.

=== International Federations that are IPC members ===
Following approval of the International Federation of Sport Climbing (IFSC) at the 2025 IPC General Assembly in Seoul, South Korea, the IPC now boasts 18 International Federations that are IPC members.

These international sport federations are recognised by the IPC as the sole worldwide representative of a specific Para™ sport on the Paralympic Games programme.

The International Federations that are currently IPC members and have sports on either the Paralympic Games and/or Paralympic Winter Games programme are: Badminton World Federation (BWF), Boccia International Sports Federation (BISFed), Fédération Equestre Internationale (FEI), International Biathlon Union (IBU), International Canoe Federation (ICF), International Federation of Sport Climbing (IFSC), International Ski and Snowboard Federation (FIS), International Table Tennis Federation (ITTF), International Tennis Federation (ITF), International Wheelchair Basketball Federation (IWBF), Union Cycliste Internationale (UCI), World Archery, World Curling, World Para Volley, World Rowing, World Taekwondo, World Triathlon, and World Wheelchair Rugby (WWR).

=== IPC Recognised International Federations ===
The IPC has awarded Recognised International Federation status to 15 International Federations, most recently recognising International SAMBO Federation and World Bowls in July 2025.

Recognition is granted in accordance with the IPC regulations.

The full list of IPC Recognised International Federations features: Federation Internationale de Powerchair Football Association (FIPFA), International Bobsleigh and Skeleton Federation (IBSF), International Bowling Federation, International Federation of CP Football, International Golf Federation, International Handball Federation (IHF), International Hockey Federation, International SAMBO Federation, International Surfing Association, Union Internationale de Pentathlon Moderne (UIPM), World Armwrestling Federation, World Bowls, World Flying Disc Federation (WFDF), World Karate Federation, and World Sailing.

=== International Organisations of Sport for the Disabled ===
Within the Paralympic Movement, there are three International Organisations of Sport for the Disabled (IOSDs). They are Virtus, the global organisation that governs, advocate, organises and promotes elite sport for athletes with an intellectual impairment; the International Blind Sport Federation (IBSA) that focuses on sport for athletes with a vision impairment; and World Abilitysport that offers competition opportunities for athletes with physical impairments.

=== World Para™ Sports ===
There are five Para sports under the World Para™ Sports umbrella that as of 2025 are part of the IPC. Four sports feature on the Paralympic Games sport programme – Para™ Athletics, Para™ Powerlifting, Para™ Swimming, and Shooting Para™ Sport – while Para™ Ice Hockey is a sport on the Paralympic Winter Games sport programme.

Up until 2022, the IPC acted as the international federation for 10 Para sports. However, following a comprehensive governance review, a new Constitution came into effect in September 2022. A key element of the governance reform is the aspiration for all of the Para sports to separate from the IPC by the end of 2026. To manage this process and ensure the continued success of the sports, a new internal division called the World Para™ Sport Unit was established. It is operationally independent of the IPC with its own Board and staff.

Progress has already been made in the area of sport separation with the transfer in July 2022 of Para™ Alpine Skiing, Para™ Cross-Country Skiing and Para™ Snowboard to the International Ski and Snowboard Federation (FIS), and Para™ Biathlon to the International Biathlon Union. The IPC also transferred governance of Para™ Dance, a non-Paralympic sport, to World Abilitysport on 1 January 2024.

- Assistive technology in sport
- ASEAN ParaGames
- Défi sportif
- FESPIC Games
- IWAS World Games
- Special Hockey
- 1st World Deaf Ice Hockey and Curling Championships
- World Deaf Football Championships
- World Cerebral Palsy Day
