= Julia K. Jaffray =

Canadian prison reformer

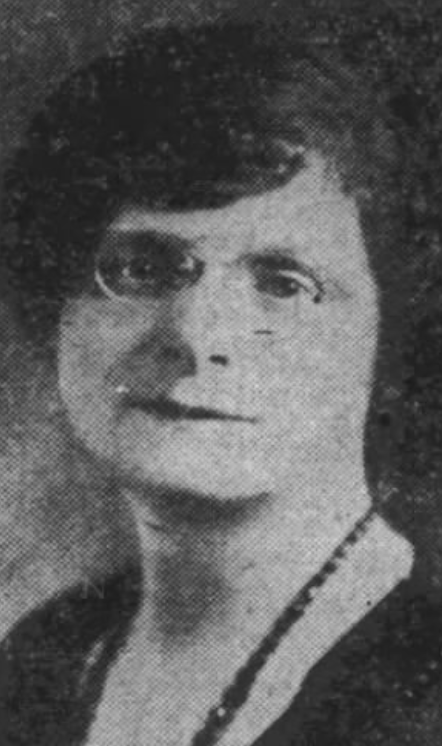
- Julia K. Jaffray, from a 1926 newspaper
- Born: May 21, 1878; Galt, Ontario, Canada
- Died: May 22, 1941; New York, New York, U.S.
- Occupation(s): Social worker, clubwoman
- Known for: National leader in prison reform and consumer rights

Julia Kippen Jaffray (May 21, 1878 – May 22, 1941) was a Canadian-born American social worker and clubwoman who was a national leader in prison reform and consumer rights.

== Early life and education ==
Jaffray was born in Galt, Ontario, Canada, the daughter of George Joseph Jaffray and Jane Kippen Nairn Jaffray. Her father and brother were bankers in Toronto.

== Career ==
Jaffray was stenographer to suffragist and clubwoman Helen Varick Boswell as a young woman. Jaffray was secretary of the National Committee on Prisons and Prison Labor. In the 1920s she served on the advisory board of the Federal Industrial Institution for Women in Alderson, West Virginia. In 1930 she was the only woman named to a New York state commission on prison administration and construction. In 1934 she was appointed to state-wide commission on education in prisons.

Jaffrey spoke and wrote in favor of meaningful work as a means of rehabilitation. She opposed the unregulated leasing of prison labor for private gain. "No person has a right to a cent of the money from prison labor but the prisoner himself and the state, until it has been paid back the prisoner's cost," she explained in 1924. "His children ought to get the benefit of his work." She opposed capital punishment.

During the 1930s, Jaffray chaired the economic adjustments division of the New York City Federation of Women's Clubs. In this role she testified before Congressional hearings in favor of the Wool Products Labeling Act of 1939. She worked for consumer protections, including food safety and standards for cotton goods, as chair of the public welfare department of the General Federation of Women's Clubs in Washington, D.C.

In 1933, Jaffray taught at a new summer program at the New York Training School for Girls, designed to give women college students interested in prison reform experience working directly with girls in the juvenile justice system. She spoke at the American Prison Association conference in 1938.

== Publications ==
- The Prison and the Prisoner: A Symposium (1917, editor)
- "Modern Prison Reform" (1924)
- "Work — The Great Reformer" (1928)

== Personal life ==
Jaffray died in 1941, at the age of 63, in New York City. Eleanor Roosevelt mentioned Jaffray's death in her My Day column, saying "I think her name will be long remembered in many women's groups and will serve to cement the friendship between the women of Canada and the United States."
