= Cambridge Hornets =

Senior ice hockey club

- City: Cambridge, Ontario
- League: OHA Senior A League (1960–1979); OHA Senior A Hockey League (1979–1987); Major League Hockey (1999–2006); Allan Cup Hockey League (2025–present)
- Colours: Yellow; Black
- Website: hornetssrhc.ca

Franchise history
- 1960–1962: Galt Terriers
- 1962–1973: Galt Hornets
- 1973–1987: Cambridge Hornets
- 1999–2006: Cambridge Hornets
- 2025–present: Cambridge Hornets

The Cambridge Hornets are a Senior ice hockey team in the Allan Cup Hockey League based in Cambridge, Ontario.

== History ==
=== OHA Senior A League (1960–1979) ===
The club traces its origins to 1960 when it was founded as the Galt Terriers of the OHA Senior A League. The Terriers won the J. Ross Robertson Cup as league champions in the 1960–61 season. The Terriers won the 1961 Allan Cup championship, concluding their first season. As the reigning Allan Cup champions, the Terriers represented Canada at the 1962 Ice Hockey World Championships finishing 2nd place, winning the silver medal. Notable players from that era include, Dave Dryden, Tod Sloan, Darryl Sly and Bill Wylie. The "Terriers" named itself had been used by teams in Galt dating back to the 1920s and 1930s, before World War II. Notable players included Larry Aurie, Clarence Boucher, John Brackenborough, Art Gauthier, Norman Himes, Carl Liscombe, Cliff McBride, Mickey Murray and Jean Pusie.

Following the 1961–62 season, the Galt Terriers were renamed the Galt Hornets. Gord Renwick served as president of the Hornets from 1966 to 1973. He was encouraged to revive the team's ownership group by close friend, and the team's previous coach Bill Wylie. In 1966, Renwick named Earl Balfour as the team's new playing coach, and signed Gary Collins.

Two seasons later, the 1968–69 Hornets team won 52 of 67 games played. They won a second J. Ross Robertson Cup in a four-game sweep of the Barrie Flyers. In the national playoffs, Galt defeated the Gander Flyers in five games, then the Victoriaville Tigers in six games to reach the final. Galt captured the 1969 Allan Cup winning in four consecutive games over the Calgary Stampeders.

Renwick and the team executive used a share-the-wealth philosophy, where the players saw proportion of the team's profits. Galt won another Ontario championship in the 1970–71 season, with the goaltending tandem of Harold Hurley and Ken Broderick. In the playoffs, Galt defeated the Barrie Flyers, Orillia Terriers, Sault Ste. Marie, Thunder Bay Twins, and the Grand Falls-Windsor Cataracts to reach the finals. Galt captured the 1971 Allan Cup winning in four consecutive games over the same Calgary team from 1969, and played to sellout crowds at the Galt Arena Gardens. The Hornets represented Canada at the 1971 Ahearne Cup in Stockholm, finishing in third place behind teams from Russia and Sweden.

The team later changed its name to the Cambridge Hornets, when Galt was amalgamated into Cambridge.

NHL alumni

List of Galt Hornets alumni who also played in the NHL.

- Earl Balfour, Ken Broderick, Gary Collins, Mike Corbett, Dave Cressman, Norm Defelice, Dave Dryden, Cec Hoekstra, Tom McCarthy, Vic Teal

List of original era Cambridge Hornets alumni who also played in the NHL.

- John Brenneman, Dave Cressman, Bob Dupuis, Gerry Gray, Gary Kurt, Dave Tataryn, Vic Teal

Season-by-season record

Season	GP	W	L	T	GF	GA	Pts	Finish	Playoffs
1960-61	40	21	13	6	135	130	48	2nd OHA Sr. A	Won League, Won Allan Cup
1961-62	34	24	10	0	178	102	48	1st OHA Sr. A	
1962-63	40	13	25	2	151	214	28	5th OHA Sr. A	
1963-64	40	25	10	5	195	144	55	2nd OHA Sr. A	Lost Final
1964-65	40	24	15	1	167	135	49	2nd OHA Sr. A	
1965-66	42	18	22	2	149	181	43	5th OHA Sr. A	
1966-67	40	23	14	3	188	162	49	4th OHA Sr. A	
1967-68	40	27	12	1	152	105	55	1st OHA Sr. A	Lost Final
1968-69	39	29	10	0	243	131	58	1st OHA Sr. A	Won League, Won Allan Cup
1969-70	40	26	11	3	198	114	55	OHA Sr. A	Lost Final
1970-71	40	32	8	0	246	103	64	OHA Sr. A	Won League, Won Allan Cup
1971-72	40	27	12	1	197	126	55	2nd OHA Sr. A	Lost Final
1972-73	44	25	18	1	200	153	51	3rd OHA Sr. A	
1973-74	40	28	12	0	165	132	56	3rd OHA Sr. A	
1974-75	40	16	21	3	175	181	35	5th OHA Sr. A	
1975-76	44	23	20	1	190	170	47	3rd OHA Sr. A	
1976-77	34	22	10	2	188	145	46	2nd OHA Sr. A	
1977-78	40	27	12	1	200	151	55	1st OHA Sr. A	
1978-79	40	21	18	1	179	170	43	3rd OHA Sr. A	
1979-80	40	29	11	0	245	144	58	2nd CSAHL	Won League
1980-81	37	33	3	1	290	119	67	1st OHA Sr. A	Lost Final
1981-82	34	23	11	0	201	115	46	3rd OHA Sr. A	Lost Final
1982-83	40	32	8	0	316	124	64	1st OHA Sr. A	Won League, Won Allan Cup
1983-84	38	26	12	0	244	139	52	1st OHA Sr. A	Won League
1984-85	40	25	12	3	210	137	53	1st OHA Sr. A	
1985-86	36	23	13	0	157	144	46	2nd OHA Sr. A	
1986-87	34	13	21	0	158	171	26	4th OHA Sr. AAA	

Sources:
- "Galt Terriers hockey team [1960–1963 OHASr] statistics and history". hockeydb.com.
- "Cambridge Hornets hockey team [1963-1987 OHASr] statistics and history". hockeydb.com.

=== Major League Hockey (1999–2006) ===
The Hornets finished the 2005-06 season in third place, or so they thought. In January 2006, they signed Chris MacKenzie a former semi-pro hockey player. Despite the fact that the player's driver's licence and health card listed him as a resident of Toronto, he lived most of the time in Indianapolis, Indiana. Two other teams in the league appealed the usage of this player as a violation of the league's residency rule, which resulted in a series of late season victories being overturned to these teams' favour. The overturned victories resulted in a drop to fifth and last place for the Hornets. Irate, the ownership of the Hornets pulled their team from the league and filed a lawsuit for damages. The Cambridge Hornets have not stepped on the ice since.

NHL alumni

List of modern era Cambridge Hornets alumni who also played in the NHL.

- Jamie Allison, Gilbert Dionne, Todd Harvey, Steven Rice, Mike Torchia, Scott Walker, Peter Zezel

Season-by-season record

Note: GP = Games played, W = Wins, L = Losses, T = Ties, OTL = Overtime losses, SOL = Shootout Loses*, Pts = Points, GF = Goals for, GA = Goals against

Season	GP	W	L	T	OTL	SOL	Pts	GF	GA	Finish	Playoffs
2001-02	32	27	4	1	0	0	55	221	91	1st OHA Sr	Lost Final
2002-03	31	21	7	1	2	0	45	144	104	1st OHA Sr	Lost Final
2003-04	32	19	11	2	0	0	40	160	137	2nd OHA Sr	
2004-05	32	18	12	0	2	0	40	149	148	3rd OHA Sr	
2005-06	30	13	14	0	1	2	29	140	144	5th OHA Sr	

Source: "Cambridge Hornets hockey team [1999-2007 OHASr] statistics and history". hockeydb.com.

=== Allan Cup Hockey League ===
In April 2025, Allan Cup Hockey announced that the team would return in the 2025–26 season.
