= Tom McCarthy (ice hockey, born 1934) =

Canadian ice hockey player

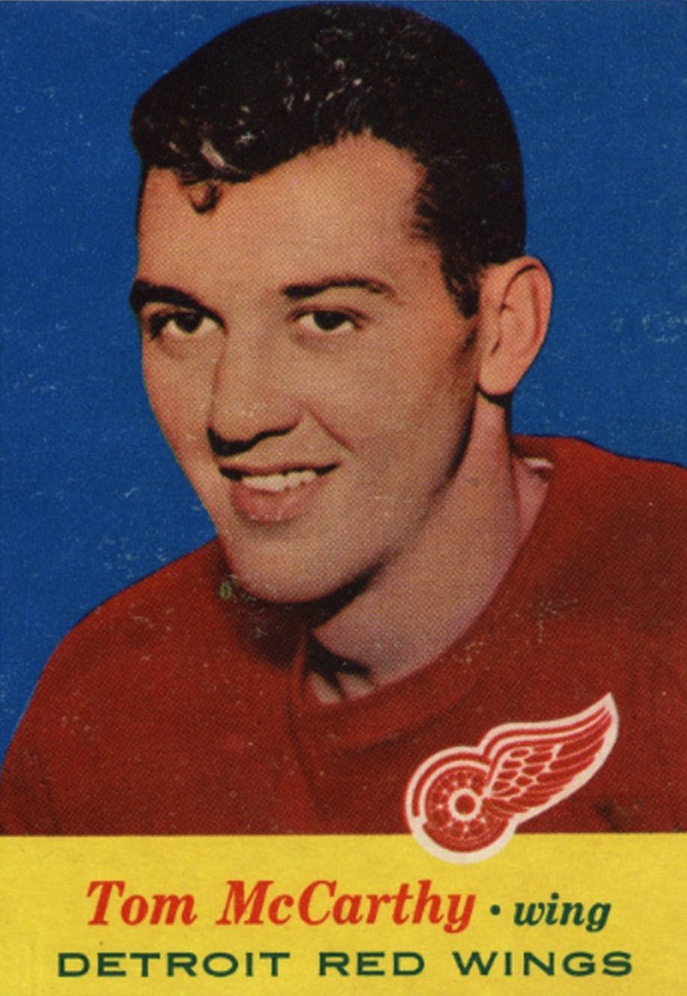
- Born: September 15, 1934 Toronto, Ontario, Canada
- Died: January 20, 1992 (aged 57) Toronto, Ontario, Canada
- Height: 6 ft 1 in (185 cm)
- Weight: 191 lb (87 kg; 13 st 9 lb)
- Position: Left wing
- Shot: Left
- Played for: Detroit Red Wings; Boston Bruins
- Playing career: 1955–1973

Thomas Francis Patrick McCarthy (September 15, 1934 – January 20, 1992) was a Canadian professional ice hockey left winger who played four seasons in the National Hockey League for the Detroit Red Wings and Boston Bruins between 1956 and 1961. The rest of his career, which lasted from 1955 to 1973, was spent in various minor leagues. McCarthy was selected in the 15th round of the 1967 NHL Expansion Draft by the Pittsburgh Penguins, going 88th overall.

== Personal life ==
He married Marlene Weaver (Died January 21, 2025) and became the father of two daughters and one son, Carol Deschamps (November 29th, 1963- November 24th, 2021), Joanne Lalonde, and Martin McCarthy (March 1st, 1958- January 8th, 2012). He had five grandchildren: grandsons Bryan McCarthy (Born 1992), Thomas Lalonde, and granddaughters Erin Deschamps (Born 1992), Holly Lalonde, and Kelly Deschamps (Born 1995). McCarthy suffered from diabetes, something his son would also suffer from.

During the off-season, McCarthy would work as a delivery driver for the Toronto Star. The job paid well and the McCarthy family was able to become the first on their street to own a television.

He died of a heart attack in his home in Toronto the morning of January 20, 1992. His wife Marlene had walked into the kitchen to find him face down at the table. Thinking at first he was asleep, she attempted to rouse him. When that failed, she realized what had happened.

== Career statistics ==
=== Regular season and playoffs ===
			Regular season					Playoffs
Season	Team	League	GP	G	A	Pts	PIM	GP	G	A	Pts	PIM
1950–51	Toronto Marlboros	OHA	2	1	0	1	0	—	—	—	—	—
1950–51	Weston Dukes	OHA-B	—	—	—	—	—	—	—	—	—	—
1951–52	Toronto Marlboros	OHA	3	2	3	5	0	—	—	—	—	—
1951–52	Weston Dukes	OHA-B	—	—	—	—	—	—	—	—	—	—
1952–53	Toronto Marlboros	OHA	56	13	12	25	56	7	0	0	0	2
1953–54	Toronto Marlboros	OHA	59	18	29	47	50	1	0	0	0	0
1954–55	Toronto Marlboros	OHA	37	23	29	52	55	6	2	5	7	21
1955–56	Vancouver Canucks	WHL	67	24	22	46	64	15	7	5	12	9
1956–57	Detroit Red Wings	NHL	3	0	0	0	0	—	—	—	—	—
1956–57	Edmonton Flyers	WHL	42	18	19	37	108	8	2	2	4	2
1957–58	Detroit Red Wings	NHL	18	2	1	3	4	—	—	—	—	—
1957–58	Edmonton Flyers	WHL	45	22	31	53	36	—	—	—	—	—
1957–58	Providence Reds	AHL	1	0	0	0	2	5	0	1	1	4
1958–59	Detroit Red Wings	NHL	15	2	3	5	4	—	—	—	—	—
1958–59	Hershey Bears	AHL	40	4	6	10	14	5	1	0	1	0
1959–60	Sudbury Wolves	EPHL	70	46	62	108	86	4	8	12	20	6
1960–61	Sudbury Wolves	EPHL	45	30	24	54	60	—	—	—	—	—
1960–61	Boston Bruins	NHL	24	4	5	9	0	—	—	—	—	—
1961–62	Kingston Frontenacs	EPHL	70	53	45	98	68	11	7	3	10	35
1962–63	Portland Buckaroos	WHL	66	27	37	64	61	7	4	4	8	0
1963–64	Portland Buckaroos	WHL	55	11	23	34	31	5	2	3	5	0
1964–65	Tulsa Oilers	CHL	68	53	44	97	110	12	3	7	10	29
1965–66	Cleveland Barons	AHL	72	33	34	67	27	12	7	5	12	6
1966–67	Cleveland Barons	AHL	70	36	38	74	21	5	2	2	4	0
1967–68	Baltimore Clippers	AHL	70	34	49	83	52	—	—	—	—	—
1968–69	Rochester Americans	AHL	68	31	31	62	34	—	—	—	—	—
1969–70	Rochester Americans	AHL	24	5	8	13	24	—	—	—	—	—
1970–71	Orillia Terriers	OHA Sr	39	22	38	60	14	—	—	—	—	—
1970–71	Galt Hornets	Al-Cup	—	—	—	—	—	—	—	—	—	—
1971–72	Orillia Terriers	OHA Sr	5	0	3	3	0	—	—	—	—	—
1972–73	Orillia Terriers	OHA Sr	24	6	15	21	22	—	—	—	—	—
1972–73	Brantford Foresters	OHA Sr	12	9	12	21	5	—	—	—	—	—
AHL totals			345	143	166	309	174	27	10	8	18	10
NHL totals			60	8	9	17	8	—	—	—	—	—
