= Galt Red Wings =

Canadian junior ice hockey team (1943–1947)

- City: Galt, Ontario
- League: Ontario Hockey Association
- Operated: 1943–1947
- Home arena: Galt Arena Gardens
- Parent club: Detroit Red Wings

Franchise history
- 1943–1944: Galt Canadians
- 1944–1947: Galt Red Wings
- 1947–1949: Galt Rockets
- 1949–1955: Galt Black Hawks

The Galt Red Wings were a Canadian junior ice hockey team based in Galt, Ontario. They played in the Ontario Hockey Association (OHA) from 1943 to 1947 and were operated as an affiliate of the Detroit Red Wings. Their home arena was the Galt Arena Gardens, and were also known as the Galt Canadians and Galt Kist Canadians during the 1943–44 OHA season. Galt were finalists for the J. Ross Robertson Cup in 1945 and 1947, but lost to Toronto St. Michael's Majors both times in four consecutive games.

== History ==
The Galt Boys' Hockey Association began a junior A team in the Ontario Hockey Association (OHA) for the 1943–44 season. The Detroit Red Wings supplied equipment and six players, and asked that former professional player Al Murray be appointed coach. Murray owned the Albion Hotel in Galt and coached the Brantford Lions in the 1942–43 season. The team operated during the 1943–44 season known as the Galt Canadians in OHA Group 2, were also known as the Galt Kist Canadians, wore orange and white uniforms, and played home games at the Galt Arena Gardens. The Canadians won 15 of 26 games played in their inaugural season.

The team changed their name to the Galt Red Wings the following year, and wore similar uniforms to their National Hockey League sponsor. During the 1944–45 season, Gordie Howe played for the team, but only played in one regular-season game. On November 18, 1944, Howe scored one goal and two assists versus the Hamilton Barons, then was deemed ineligible to play in the OHA due to limits on transferring players from Western Canada, and his points were stricken from the record when Hamilton withdrew from the league.

The Galt Red Wings reached the league finals for the J. Ross Robertson Cup in 1945 and 1947, but lost to Toronto St. Michael's Majors both times in four consecutive games. Norman Himes coached Galt for the 1946–47 season. Following the season, Lloyd Pollock who owned the Windsor Spitfires, convinced the Detroit Red Wings to relocate prospect players from Galt to Windsor. After the NHL sponsorship was cancelled, Galt affiliated with the Philadelphia Rockets of the American Hockey League as of the 1947–48 season, and were renamed the Galt Rockets.

== National Hockey League alumni ==
From the Galt Red Wings and Canadians, fourteen players graduated to play in the National Hockey League:

- Pete Babando
- Pete Conacher
- Lee Fogolin Sr.
- Fred Glover
- Warren Godfrey
- Bronco Horvath
- Gordie Howe
- Tom McGrattan
- Marty Pavelich
- Nels Podolsky
- Jack Price
- Terry Sawchuk
- Barry Sullivan
- Bill Wylie

== Season-by-season results ==
Regular season and playoffs results:

Legend: GP = Games played, W = Wins, L = Losses, T = Ties, Pts = Points, GF = Goals for, GA = Goals against

Memorial Cup champions	OHA champions	OHA finalists

Season	City	Games	Won	Lost	Tied	Points	Pct %	Goals for	Goals against	Standing	Playoffs
1943–44	Canadians	26	15	11	0	30	0.577	125	97	2nd Group 2	Lost quarterfinal (Toronto St. Michael's Majors) 3–1
1944–45	Red Wings	20	12	8	0	24	0.600	83	91	2nd OHA (tie)	Won quarterfinal (Oshawa Generals) 3–0; Won semifinal (Toronto Young Rangers) 2–1; Lost OHA final (Toronto St. Michael's Majors) 4–0
1945–46	Red Wings	28	22	6	0	44	0.786	187	96	2nd OHA	Lost semifinal (Toronto St. Michael's Majors) 4–1
1946–47	Red Wings	36	27	9	0	54	0.750	232	99	3rd OHA	Won quarterfinal (Stratford Kroehlers) 2–0; Won semifinal (Barrie Flyers) 2–1; Lost OHA final (Toronto St. Michael's Majors) 4–0
