= Galt Rockets =

Canadian junior ice hockey team (1947–1949)

- City: Galt, Ontario
- League: Ontario Hockey Association
- Operated: 1947–1949
- Home arena: Galt Arena Gardens
- Parent club: Philadelphia Rockets

Franchise history
- 1943–1944: Galt Canadians
- 1944–1947: Galt Red Wings
- 1947–1949: Galt Rockets
- 1949–1955: Galt Black Hawks

The Galt Rockets were a junior ice hockey team based in Galt, Ontario, now a part of the city of Cambridge. They played in the Ontario Hockey Association (OHA) from 1947 to 1949. Their home arena was the Galt Arena Gardens.

The team originated as the Galt Canadians, then became Galt Red Wings when affiliated as a farm team for the Detroit Red Wings of the National Hockey League. When the affiliation with the Detroit Red Wings was cancelled, Galt affiliated with the Philadelphia Rockets of the American Hockey League as of the 1947–48 OHA season.

The Rockets won only 11 games during the 1948–49 OHA season, and did not qualify for the playoffs. After the ast-place finish in a nine-team league, the Chicago Black Hawks became the sponsors as of the 1949–40 OHA season, with the junior team playing as the Galt Black Hawks.

== National Hockey League alumni ==
From the Rockets, four players graduated to play in the National Hockey League:

- Bronco Horvath
- Harry Pidhirny
- Don Simmons
- Bill Wylie

== Season-by-season results ==
Regular season and playoffs results:

Legend: GP = Games played, W = Wins, L = Losses, T = Ties, Pts = Points, GF = Goals for, GA = Goals against

Season	Regular season									Playoffs
Season	GP	W	L	T	Pts	Pct	GF	GA	Finish	Playoffs
1947–48	36	18	13	5	41	0.581	168	129	5th OHA	Won quarterfinal (St. Catharines Teepees) 2–1; Lost semifinal (Barrie Flyers) 3–2
1948–49	48	11	34	3	25	0.244	154	252	9th OHA	Did not qualify
