= Galt Arena Gardens =

Arena in Cambridge, Ontario

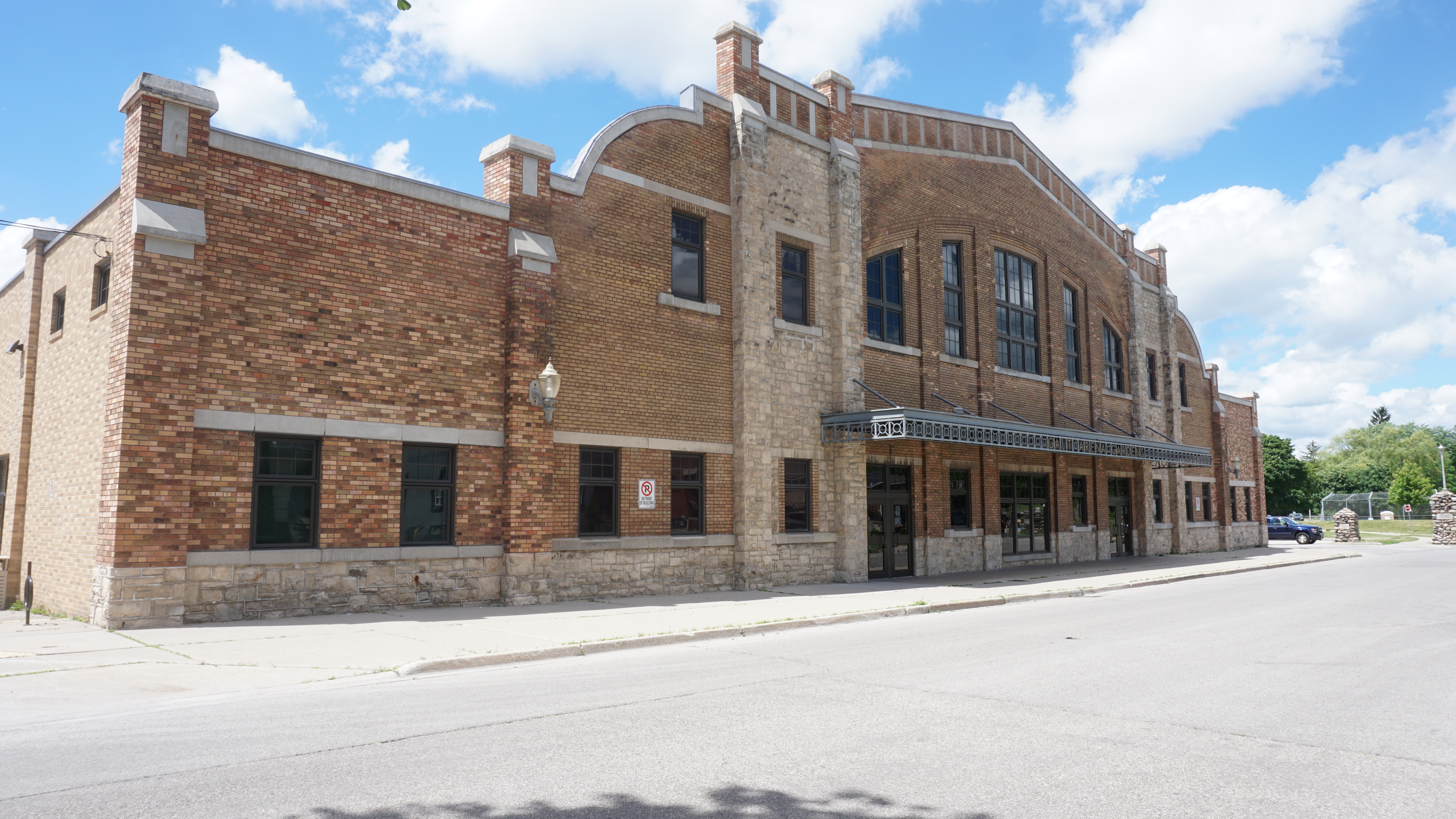
- Front facade of Galt Arena Gardens
- Interactive map of Galt Arena Gardens
- Location: 98 Shade St., Cambridge, Ontario
- Coordinates: 43°21′47″N 80°18′23″W
- Capacity: 1,100
- Surface: mechanically frozen ice
- Field size: 200 ft x 80 ft (surface)

Construction
- Groundbreaking: 1921
- Opened: January 1922

The Galt Arena Gardens is the oldest operating ice hockey arena in the world. Galt Arena Gardens opened in January 1922. It was located in the city of Galt, which is now a part of the city of Cambridge, Ontario. It is the home of the junior hockey team, Cambridge Redhawks as well as the Special Hockey International team, Cambridge Ice Hounds. The arena is noted for its impressive external facade. Hockey legend Gordie Howe played in the arena for the Galt Red Wings during the 1944-1945 season before playing in the National Hockey League. Former New York Americans centreman Norman Himes grew up right across the street from the arena at 91 Shade Street. He played OHA senior hockey in the arena for the Galt Terriers. Ontario Hockey Association teams including the Galt Rockets and Galt Black Hawks also played at the building.

Several ice hockey arenas are older, including the Aberdeen Pavilion in Ottawa, built in 1898, and the Stannus Street Rink, of Windsor, Nova Scotia, built in 1897, but are no longer in operation for ice hockey. The 1910 Matthews Arena in Boston which formerly held the title of oldest operating hockey arena, has now closed permanently. It's owner, Northeastern University has announced plans to demolish the facility.

The arena was most recently renovated in 1997, replacing the concrete floor, the spectator seating and the dressing rooms. The Arena was closed for the entire 1997-98 season. The renovation reduced seating capacity from 2,000 to 1,100.
