= Barry Sullivan (ice hockey) =

Canadian ice hockey player

- Born: September 21, 1927 Preston, Ontario, Canada
- Died: June 5, 1989 (aged 61) Canyon Lake, Texas, U.S.
- Height: 6 ft 0 in (183 cm)
- Weight: 185 lb (84 kg; 13 st 3 lb)
- Position: Right wing
- Shot: Right
- Played for: Detroit Red Wings
- Playing career: 1945–1953

Barry Carter Sullivan (September 21, 1927 – June 5, 1989) was a professional ice hockey right winger who played in one National Hockey League game for the Detroit Red Wings during the 1947–48 season, on February 3, 1948, against the Chicago Black Hawks. The rest of his career, which lasted from 1945 to 1953, was spent in the minor leagues.

== Career statistics ==
=== Regular season and playoffs ===
			Regular season					Playoffs
Season	Team	League	GP	G	A	Pts	PIM	GP	G	A	Pts	PIM
1943–44	Stratford Kroelhers	OHA	8	9	3	12	4	—	—	—	—	—
1943–44	Galt Red Wings	OHA	13	10	9	19	0	2	0	1	1	2
1944–45	Oshawa Generals	OHA	20	21	14	35	19	3	2	4	6	0
1944–45	Porcupine Combines	M-Cup	—	—	—	—	—	3	1	1	2	2
1945–46	Omaha Knights	USHL	40	11	14	25	15	—	—	—	—	—
1946–47	Omaha Knights	USHL	38	21	21	42	12	11	7	9	16	8
1946–47	Indianapolis Capitals	AHL	19	0	1	1	2	—	—	—	—	—
1947–48	Detroit Red Wings	NHL	1	0	0	0	0	—	—	—	—	—
1947–48	Indianapolis Capitals	AHL	68	22	26	48	14	—	—	—	—	—
1948–49	St. Louis Flyers	AHL	63	32	38	70	21	7	3	3	6	0
1949–50	St. Louis Flyers	AHL	69	19	38	57	20	2	0	0	0	0
1950–51	St. Louis Flyers	AHL	28	3	13	16	6	—	—	—	—	—
1950–51	New Haven Eagles	AHL	14	7	10	17	2	—	—	—	—	—
1950–51	Providence Reds	AHL	11	6	6	12	0	—	—	—	—	—
1951–52	Providence Reds	AHL	61	25	47	72	12	14	6	12	18	8
1952–53	Providence Reds	AHL	61	23	37	60	31	—	—	—	—	—
AHL totals			394	137	216	353	108	23	9	15	24	8
NHL totals			1	0	0	0	0	—	—	—	—	—

== See also ==
- List of players who played only one game in the NHL
