= John Brackenborough =

Canadian ice hockey player (1897–1993)

- Born: February 9, 1897 Parry Sound, Ontario, Canada
- Died: July 8, 1993 (aged 96) Dunedin, Florida, U.S.
- Height: 5 ft 11 in (180 cm)
- Weight: 170 lb (77 kg; 12 st 2 lb)
- Position: Left wing/Centre
- Shot: Left
- Played for: Boston Bruins
- Playing career: 1919–1926

John Charles "Spider" Brackenborough (February 9, 1897 – July 8, 1993) was a Canadian professional hockey player left winger. He played 7 games for the Boston Bruins of the National Hockey League as well as in the NOHA, OHA-Sr, and OCHL. Brackenborough has the longest non-hyphenated name of any player in the history of the league, currently tied with Ivan Miroshnichenko after his debut in 2024.

Brackenborough played for the Ottawa Grand Trunk from 1915 to 1919, Depot Harbour during the 1919–1920 season, North Bay Trappers from 1920 to 1922, Hamilton Tigers from 1922 to 1924, and the Galt Terriers during the 1924–1925 season. He joined the Boston Bruins during the 1925–1926 season. He only played 7 games before retiring due to an eye injury.

== Career statistics ==
=== Regular season and playoffs ===
			Regular season					Playoffs
Season	Team	League	GP	G	A	Pts	PIM	GP	G	A	Pts	PIM
1915–16	Ottawa Grand Trunk	OCHL	4	2	0	2	—	—	—	—	—	—
1919–20	Depot Harbour	NOHA	—	—	—	—	—	—	—	—	—	—
1920–21	North Bay Trappers	NOHA	6	6	5	11	4	—	—	—	—	—
1921–22	North Bay Trappers	NOHA	6	7	3	10	6	—	—	—	—	—
1922–23	Hamilton Tigers	OHA Sr	12	20	8	28	—	2	1	2	3	—
1923–24	Hamilton Tigers	OHA Sr	10	13	12	25	—	2	1	2	3	—
1924–25	Galt Terriers	OHA Sr	—	—	—	—	—	—	—	—	—	—
1925–26	Boston Bruins	NHL	7	0	0	0	0	—	—	—	—	—
NHL totals			7	0	0	0	0	—	—	—	—	—
