= William Gordon Mackendrick =

Canadian soldier and author

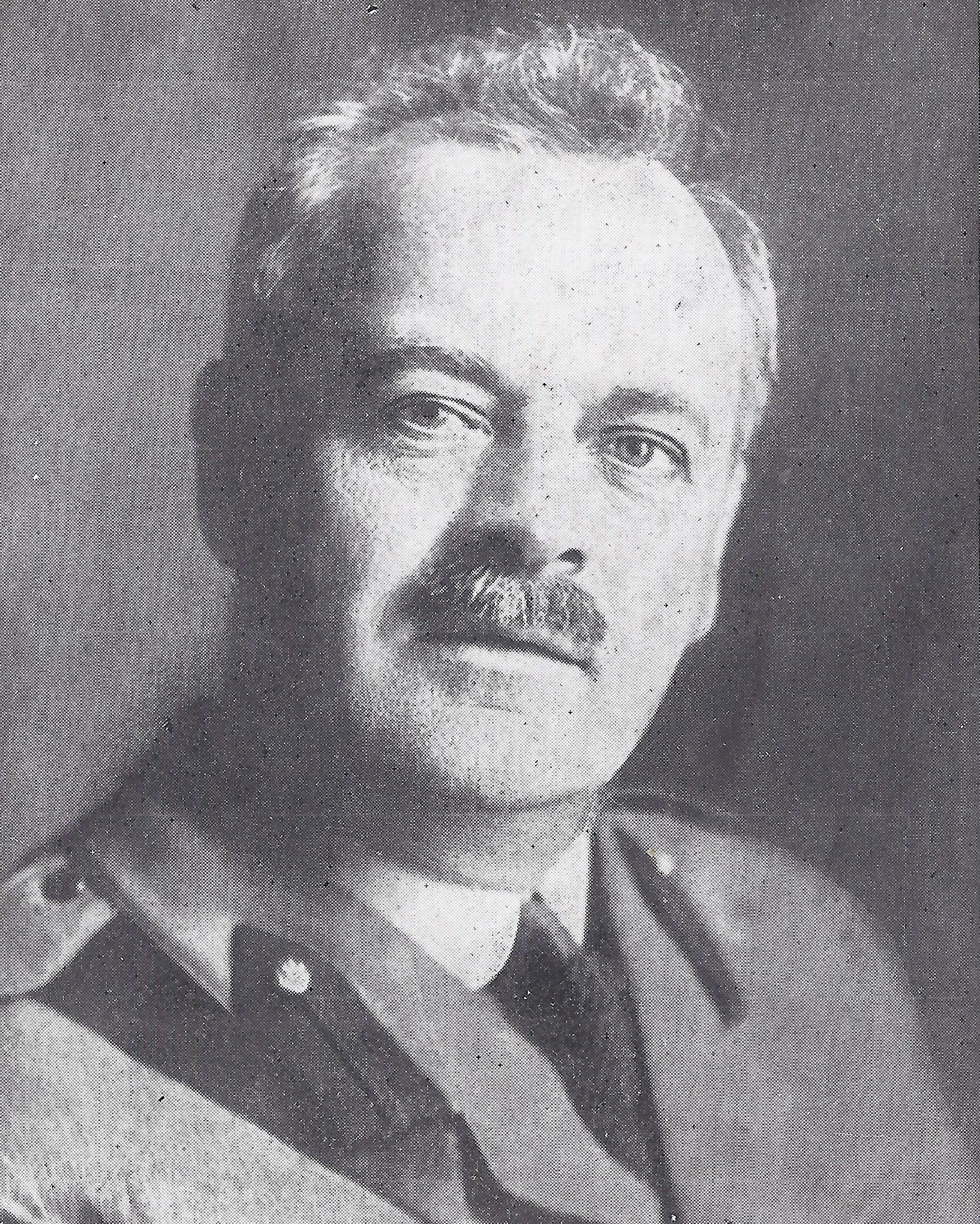
- Lt.-Col. William Gordon Mackendrick.
- Born: 23 August 1864; Galt, Canada West
- Died: 22 September 1959 (aged 95); Oakville, Ontario Canada
- Military career
- Allegiance: Canada/British Empire
- Branch: Canadian Army
- Rank: Lieutenant-colonel
- Nickname: The Roadbuilder
- Conflicts: Battle of Jerusalem

William Gordon Mackendrick (23 August 1864 – 22 September 1959) was a Canadian soldier and author.

== Biography ==
Mackendrick was born in Galt, Canada West. He served in the First World War with the Canadian Expeditionary Force. In 1916 he was seconded to the British 5th army and promoted to Lieutenant-Colonel in charge of roads. He served with Sir. Edmund Allenby in the Sinai and Palestine Campaign against the Ottoman Empire.

With the pen name "The Roadbuilder", he wrote religious themed books on British Israelism. He died in Oakville, Ontario in 1959.

== Publications ==
- The Destiny of Britain and America, (1921)
- The Freedom of the Seas, (1929)
- God's Commonwealths, British and American, (1930)
- God's Economic Plan, (1932)
- This is Armageddon, (1942)
