= Dave Cressman =

Canadian retired ice hockey left winger

- Born: January 2, 1950 (age 76) Kitchener, Ontario, Canada
- Height: 6 ft 1 in (185 cm)
- Weight: 180 lb (82 kg; 12 st 12 lb)
- Position: Left wing
- Shot: Left
- Played for: Minnesota North Stars
- NHL draft: 48th overall, 1970; Minnesota North Stars
- Playing career: 1973–1980

David Gregory Cressman (born January 2, 1950) is a Canadian retired ice hockey left winger. He played 85 games in the NHL for the Minnesota North Stars over the 1974–75 and 1975–76 NHL seasons.

Cressman was born in Kitchener, Ontario. He was drafted by the Minnesota North Stars in the fourth round (48th overall) of the 1970 NHL Amateur Draft, but he did not begin to play professional hockey until after he had completed his university education to become a teacher.

== Coaching career ==
During the 1990s Cressman coached Junior B hockey at the University of Waterloo, and during the 2002-03 season he stepped in to coach nine games for the Odessa Jackalopes (Central Hockey League) while their regular head coach, Don McKee was having heart surgery.

== Career statistics ==
=== Regular season and playoffs ===
			Regular season					Playoffs
Season	Team	League	GP	G	A	Pts	PIM	GP	G	A	Pts	PIM
1966–67	Kitchener Greenshirts	COJHL	—	7	16	23	—	—	—	—	—	—
1967–68	Kitchener Greenshirts	COJHL	—	18	—	—	—	—	—	—	—	—
1967–68	Kitchener Rangers	OHA	1	0	3	3	0	19	0	1	1	2
1968–69	Kitchener Rangers	OHA	54	29	26	55	33	—	—	—	—	—
1969–70	Kitchener Rangers	OHA	50	18	39	57	69	6	3	7	10	4
1970–71	Galt Hornets	OHA Sr	—	—	—	—	—	—	—	—	—	—
1971–72	Galt Hornets	OHA Sr	40	19	34	53	24	—	—	—	—	—
1972–73	Galt Hornets	OHA Sr	19	2	6	8	20	—	—	—	—	—
1973–74	Saginaw Gears	IHL	75	32	35	67	49	9	5	3	8	37
1974–75	Minnesota North Stars	NHL	5	2	0	2	4	—	—	—	—	—
1974–75	New Haven Nighthawks	AHL	66	11	15	26	41	16	7	14	21	6
1975–76	Minnesota North Stars	NHL	80	4	8	12	33	—	—	—	—	—
1976–77	New Haven Nighthawks	AHL	80	25	31	56	64	6	1	0	1	4
1977–78	Cambridge Hornets	OHA Sr	25	9	11	20	4	—	—	—	—	—
NHL totals			85	6	8	14	37	—	—	—	—	—
