= Vic Teal =

Canadian ice hockey player

- Born: August 10, 1949 (age 77) St. Catharines, Ontario, Canada
- Height: 6 ft 1 in (185 cm)
- Weight: 160 lb (73 kg; 11 st 6 lb)
- Position: Right wing
- Shot: Right
- Played for: New York Islanders
- NHL draft: 42nd overall, 1969; St. Louis Blues
- Playing career: 1969–1977

Victor "Skeeter" Teal (born August 10, 1949) is a Canadian retired professional ice hockey right winger who played in one National Hockey League game for the New York Islanders during the 1973–74 NHL season. The rest of his career, which lasted from 1969 to 1977, was spent in various minor leagues. He is the younger brother of Skip Teal, who also played in only one NHL game.

== Career statistics ==
=== Regular season and playoffs ===
			Regular season					Playoffs
Season	Team	League	GP	G	A	Pts	PIM	GP	G	A	Pts	PIM
1965–66	St. Catharines Falcons	NDJBHL	30	34	25	59	—	7	13	9	22	—
1965–66	St. Catharines Black Hawks	OHA	—	—	—	—	—	4	0	0	0	0
1966–67	St. Catharines Black Hawks	OHA	47	15	15	30	4	6	1	0	1	2
1967–68	St. Catharines Black Hawks	OHA	54	34	29	63	29	5	1	5	6	0
1968–69	St. Catharines Black Hawks	OHA	51	30	53	83	55	18	8	18	26	11
1969–70	Kansas City Blues	CHL	58	8	13	21	28	—	—	—	—	—
1971–72	Galt Hornets	OHA Sr	36	36	27	63	11	—	—	—	—	—
1972–73	New Haven Nighthawks	AHL	69	18	34	52	6	—	—	—	—	—
1973–74	New York Islanders	NHL	1	0	0	0	0	—	—	—	—	—
1973–74	Fort Worth Wings	CHL	72	33	43	76	8	5	0	1	1	0
1974–75	Fort Worth Texans	CHL	69	27	29	56	20	—	—	—	—	—
1975–76	Erie Blades	NAHL	63	36	27	63	4	2	0	2	2	0
1976–77	Cambridge Hornets	OHA Sr	12	14	7	21	0	—	—	—	—	—
CHL totals			199	68	85	153	56	5	0	1	1	0
NHL totals			1	0	0	0	0	—	—	—	—	—

== See also ==
- List of players who played only one game in the NHL
