= 1969 Allan Cup =

Canadian senior ice hockey championship

The Allan Cup trophy

The 1969 Allan Cup was the Canadian senior ice hockey championship for the 1968–69 senior "A" season. The event was hosted by the Galt Hornets and Galt, Ontario. The 1969 playoff marked the 61st time that the Allan Cup has been awarded.

== Teams ==
- Galt Hornets (Eastern Canadian Champions)
- Calgary Stampeders (Western Canadian Champions)

== Playdowns ==
=== Allan Cup Best-of-Seven Series ===
Galt Hornets 7 - Calgary Stampeders 2
Galt Hornets 9 - Calgary Stampeders 3
Galt Hornets 4 - Calgary Stampeders 1
Galt Hornets 7 - Calgary Stampeders 2

=== Eastern Playdowns ===
Quarter-final

Galt Hornets defeated Sault Ste. Marie Canadians 3-games-to-none

Galt Hornets 4 - Sault Ste. Marie Canadians 1
Galt Hornets 8 - Sault Ste. Marie Canadians 2
Galt Hornets 5 - Sault Ste. Marie Canadians 1

Semi-final

Galt Hornets defeated Gander Flyers 4-games-to-1

Galt Hornets 4 - Gander Flyers 3
Galt Hornets 7 - Gander Flyers 4
Gander Flyers 5 - Galt Hornets 4
Galt Hornets 6 - Gander Flyers 4
Galt Hornets 6 - Gander Flyers 1

Final

Galt Hornets defeated Victoriaville Tigers 4-games-to-2

Victoriaville Tigers 3 - Galt Hornets 2
Galt Hornets 2 - Victoriaville Tigers 1
Galt Hornets 3 - Victoriaville Tigers 1
Galt Hornets 3 - Victoriaville Tigers 2
Victoriaville Tigers 6 - Galt Hornets 2
Galt Hornets 5 - Victoriaville Tigers 2

=== Western Playdowns ===
Quarter-final

Port Arthur Bearcats defeated Warroad Lakers 3-games-to-none

Port Arthur Bearcats 6 - Warroad Lakers 1
Port Arthur Bearcats 8 - Warroad Lakers 3
Port Arthur Bearcats 9 - Warroad Lakers 3

Pacific Semi-final

Calgary Stampeders defeated Spokane Jets 3-games-to-2

Spokane Jets 4 - Calgary Stampeders 3
Calgary Stampeders 4 - Spokane Jets 2
Spokane Jets 4 - Calgary Stampeders 2
Calgary Stampeders 5 - Spokane Jets 4
Calgary Stampeders 4 - Spokane Jets 2

West Semi-final

Port Arthur Bearcats defeated Regina Capitals 3-games-to-1

Port Arthur Bearcats 9 - Regina Capitals 2
Port Arthur Bearcats 17 - Regina Capitals 3
Regina Capitals 5 - Port Arthur Bearcats 4
Port Arthur Bearcats 6 - Regina Capitals 2

Final

Calgary Stampeders defeated Port Arthur Bearcats 3-games-to-1

Port Arthur Bearcats 4 - Calgary Stampeders 1
Calgary Stampeders 6 - Port Arthur Bearcats 2
Calgary Stampeders 3 - Port Arthur Bearcats 1
Calgary Stampeders 7 - Port Arthur Bearcats 1
