= Earl Balfour =

Canadian ice hockey player (1933–2018)

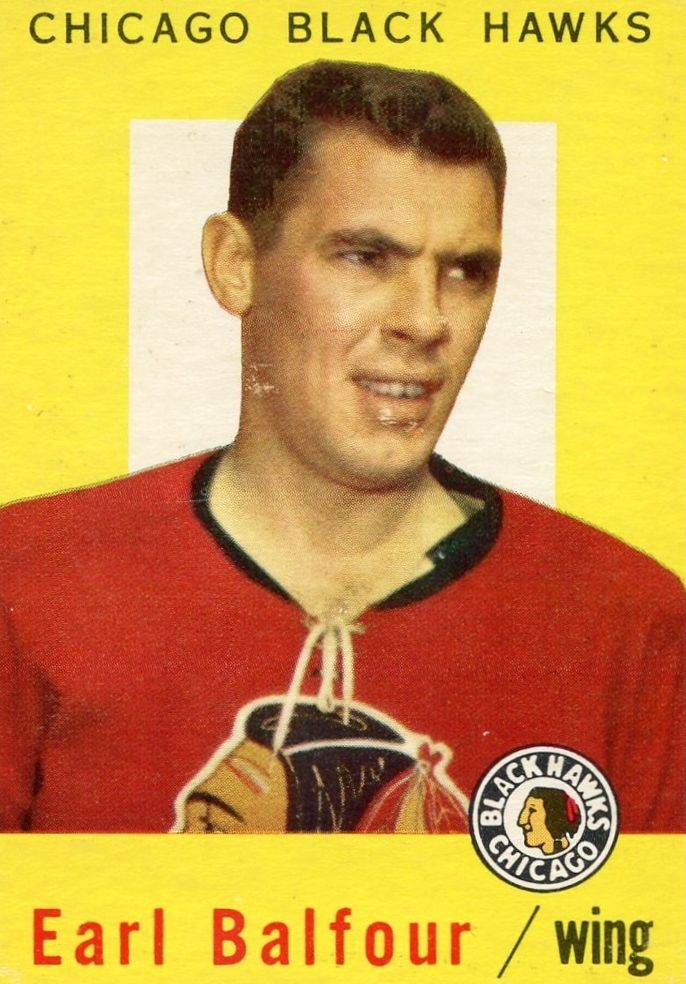
- Born: January 4, 1933 Toronto, Ontario, Canada
- Died: April 27, 2018 (aged 85) Guelph, Ontario, Canada
- Height: 6 ft 1 in (185 cm)
- Weight: 180 lb (82 kg; 12 st 12 lb)
- Position: Left Wing
- Shot: Left
- Played for: Toronto Maple Leafs; Chicago Black Hawks
- Playing career: 1952–1961

Earl Frederick "Spider" Balfour (January 4, 1933 – April 27, 2018) was a Canadian professional ice hockey player. He played in the National Hockey League from 1952 to 1961 with the Toronto Maple Leafs and Chicago Black Hawks. Balfour was a defensive forward and penalty-killing expert. Balfour won the Stanley Cup with Chicago in 1961. He retired after 288 games, posting 30 goals, 22 assists, 52 points and just 78 penalty minutes.

== Personal ==
Balfour was born in Toronto on January 4, 1933 and had four siblings: Arthur, Gail, Brenda and David. With wife Marjorie, he was the father of nine, all names beginning with P: Pamela, Parker, Patrick, Patti, Paul, Peggy, Penny, Peter and Piper.

Balfour died April 27, 2018, after having lived in the Cambridge, Ontario area. He was survived by 16 grand-children and 13 great-grandchildren.

== Playing career ==
Balfour played his junior hockey for the Toronto Marlboros of the Ontario Hockey Association, his professional rights signed to the Toronto Maple Leafs. After a couple of games with the Marlboros in 1949-50, he played two full seasons of junior with the Marlboros.

Balfour played four games in the 1951-52 for the Maple Leafs and became a full-time professional in 1952, with the Pittsburgh Hornets, then a Maple Leafs affiliate. In 1955, he played the entire 1955-56 season with Toronto, recording 14 goals and five assists, his best season in the NHL. The following season, he was assigned to the Rochester Americans for the entire season. The following season, he was able to play one game for the Maple Leafs and 70 games with Rochester. In 1958, he was picked up in the intra-league draft in June, 1958 by the Chicago Black Hawks. He played the next three seasons with Chicago, including the Stanley Cup championship in 1961. He played the next two seasons back with Pittsburgh before retiring from professional hockey.

After a year off, Belfour returned to amateur hockey with the Galt Hornets of the OHA Senior league, playing three seasons with Galt. He then finished his playing career with the Marlboros senior team and the Orillia Terriers senior team before retiring for good in 1969.

== Career statistics ==
=== Regular season and playoffs ===
| | | | Regular season | | | | | Playoffs |
| Season | Team | League | GP | G | A | Pts | PIM | GP | G | A | Pts | PIM |
|---|---|---|---|---|---|---|---|---|---|---|---|---|
| 1949–50 | Toronto Marlboros | OHA | 2 | 0 | 0 | 0 | 2 | — | — | — | — | — |
| 1950–51 | Toronto Marlboros | OHA | 53 | 10 | 16 | 26 | 53 | 13 | 6 | 4 | 10 | 16 |
| 1951–52 | Toronto Marlboros | OHA | 51 | 10 | 29 | 39 | 75 | 6 | 3 | 3 | 6 | 8 |
| 1951–52 | Toronto Maple Leafs | NHL | 3 | 0 | 0 | 0 | 2 | 1 | 0 | 0 | 0 | 0 |
| 1952–53 | Pittsburgh Hornets | AHL | 63 | 14 | 30 | 44 | 33 | 10 | 0 | 4 | 4 | 14 |
| 1953–54 | Toronto Maple Leafs | NHL | 17 | 0 | 1 | 1 | 6 | — | — | — | — | — |
| 1953–54 | Pittsburgh Hornets | AHL | 51 | 16 | 22 | 38 | 29 | 4 | 1 | 1 | 2 | 0 |
| 1954–55 | Pittsburgh Hornets | AHL | 63 | 17 | 31 | 48 | 42 | 10 | 2 | 9 | 11 | 9 |
| 1955–56 | Toronto Maple Leafs | NHL | 59 | 14 | 5 | 19 | 40 | 3 | 0 | 1 | 1 | 2 |
| 1956–57 | Rochester Americans | AHL | 63 | 21 | 16 | 37 | 38 | 10 | 3 | 5 | 8 | 6 |
| 1957–58 | Toronto Maple Leafs | NHL | 1 | 0 | 0 | 0 | 0 | — | — | — | — | — |
| 1957–58 | Rochester Americans | AHL | 70 | 27 | 31 | 58 | 58 | — | — | — | — | — |
| 1958–59 | Chicago Black Hawks | NHL | 70 | 10 | 8 | 18 | 10 | 6 | 0 | 2 | 2 | 0 |
| 1959–60 | Chicago Black Hawks | NHL | 70 | 3 | 5 | 8 | 16 | 4 | 0 | 0 | 0 | 0 |
| 1960–61 | Chicago Black Hawks | NHL | 68 | 3 | 3 | 6 | 4 | 12 | 0 | 0 | 0 | 2 |
| 1961–62 | Pittsburgh Hornets | AHL | 64 | 19 | 19 | 38 | 28 | — | — | — | — | — |
| 1962–63 | Pittsburgh Hornets | AHL | 71 | 7 | 15 | 22 | 30 | — | — | — | — | — |
| 1964–65 | Galt Hornets | OHA Sr | 34 | 19 | 23 | 42 | 18 | 4 | 4 | 6 | 10 | 6 |
| 1965–66 | Galt Hornets | OHA Sr | 42 | 22 | 28 | 50 | 33 | — | — | — | — | — |
| 1966–67 | Galt Hornets | OHA Sr | 39 | 21 | 15 | 36 | 32 | — | — | — | — | — |
| 1967–68 | Toronto Marlboros | OHA Sr | 36 | 22 | 22 | 44 | 12 | — | — | — | — | — |
| 1968–69 | Orillia Terriers | OHA Sr | 37 | 4 | 13 | 17 | 10 | — | — | — | — | — |
| AHL totals | | | 445 | 121 | 164 | 285 | 258 | 34 | 6 | 19 | 25 | 29 |
| NHL totals | | | 288 | 30 | 22 | 52 | 78 | 26 | 0 | 3 | 3 | 4 |

== Awards and achievements ==
- OHA-Sr. Second All-Star Team (1965, 1966, 1967)
- 1961 Stanley Cup championship (Chicago Black Hawks)
