= 2009 World Deaf Ice Hockey and Curling Championships =

International sports event for deaf people

The 2009 World Deaf Ice Hockey and Curling Championships was held from April 10 to 18 in Winnipeg, Canada under the leadership of Brian Broszeit. It was the first winter sporting event at which deaf hockey and curling athletes competed at an elite level.

About 250 athletes from Canada, Great Britain, Russia, Finland, Switzerland, Sweden, Slovakia, Hungary, Croatia and the United States participated in the event. More than 800 fans and participants were involved as well.

To qualify for the games, athletes must have a hearing loss of at least 55 dB in their "better ear". Hearing aids, cochlear implants and the like are not allowed to be used in competition, to place all athletes on the same level. Other examples of ways the games vary from hearing competitions are the manner in which they are officiated. The hockey arenas were set up with strobe lights to indicate stoppages of play, instead of blowing whistles.
