= Special hockey =

Sport for athletes with developmental or cognitive challenges

Special hockey is a version of ice hockey adapted for athletes with a developmental disability or cognitive disorder. It differs from ice sledge hockey, which was developed instead for athletes with a physical disability. Special hockey is sometimes known as adaptive hockey, and emphasizes fun, teamwork, social interaction, and providing an environment adapted to the ability of the participant. It provides an opportunity to be accepted and part of a team, that otherwise would not exist. Special hockey programs are open to males and females of all ages, not just children. Special hockey uses standard ice hockey equipment, has modified ice hockey rules such as no offside, icing, or penalties, and is a non-contact sport without scores and standings.

The sport is organized by volunteers and nonprofit organizations, and relies on sponsorships, and fundraising, for the majority of costs. Programs originated in Canada and the United States. North American clubs are affiliated with the Canadian Special Hockey Association, and the American Special Hockey Association, which are in turn affiliated with Hockey Canada and USA Hockey respectively. USA Hockey offers a grant to assist new and existing special hockey programs.

Special Hockey International organizes an annual international tournament for Special Hockey clubs in North America and Europe.
