= Special Hockey International =

Special hockey organization

- Formation: 1992; 34 years ago
- Type: Non-governmental organization
- Purpose: Hockey for the developmentally challenged
- Region served: North America & Europe
- Website: www.specialhockeyinternational.org

Special Hockey International is an international organization for special hockey clubs and teams. It is a non-governmental organization, that promotes ice hockey in an inclusive environment for athletes with a developmental disability, and organizes an annual international tournament for its member clubs. It was founded in 1992, by Pat Flick. Originating in North America, the majority of its members are from the United States, and Canada. Special Hockey International has begun to expand into Europe. As of 2019, Norway has three teams and the United Kingdom has two clubs, and Denmark and Sweden have one club each.

== History ==
The annual tournament began in 1994 in St. Louis, and is affiliated with Canadian Special Hockey Association, and the American Special Hockey Association, and sanctioned by Hockey Canada, and USA Hockey respectively. The event typically alternates between the United States and Canada, but the 2012 version was hosted in London, England. The 2013 event in Kitchener, Ontario, was featured by Don Cherry on Hockey Night in Canada. The National Hockey League Players' Association also created a video message for the participating special teams which included NHL players Gabriel Landeskog, Brad Boyes, David Clarkson, Dougie Hamilton, Max Pacioretty, Andrew Ference, and Adam McQuaid. The annual international tournament has grown to include over 1,000 players from over 60 clubs, and has inspired other local tournaments.

== Fraud incident ==
In November, 2016, president Dave Tuck, and his wife Cathie were charged with fraud estimated at more than $40,000. The couple had founded the Peterborough Huskies club in 2013, which was scheduled to host the international tournament in 2017, in Peterborough, Ontario. Tuck was suspended indefinitely as president. The 2017 event went on as planned, and Special Hockey International donated $8,400 to local community clubs, and $10,000 to fraud victims.
