= Gary Collins (ice hockey) =

Canadian ice hockey player (1935–2022)

- Born: September 27, 1935 Toronto, Ontario, Canada
- Died: June 17, 2022 (aged 86) Toronto, Ontario, Canada
- Height: 5 ft 11 in (180 cm)
- Weight: 185 lb (84 kg; 13 st 3 lb)
- Position: Centre
- Shot: Left
- Played for: Toronto Maple Leafs
- Playing career: 1956–1968

Ranleigh Gary Collins (September 27, 1935 – June 17, 2022) was a Canadian ice hockey centre who played two playoff games in the National Hockey League for the Toronto Maple Leafs during the 1958–59 season. The rest of his career, which lasted from 1956 to 1968, was spent in the minor leagues.

Collins died in June 2022 at the age of 86.

== Career statistics ==
=== Regular season and playoffs ===
			Regular season					Playoffs
Season	Team	League	GP	G	A	Pts	PIM	GP	G	A	Pts	PIM
1951–52	Kitchener Greenshirts	OHA	30	9	3	12	0	—	—	—	—	—
1952–53	Kitchener Greenshirts	OHA	56	18	26	44	0	—	—	—	—	—
1954–55	Toronto Marlboros	OHA	51	20	16	36	0	—	—	—	—	—
1954–55	Toronto Marlboros	M-Cup	—	—	—	—	—	11	5	5	10	14
1955–56	Toronto Marlboros	OHA	48	16	45	61	0	—	—	—	—	—
1955–56	Toronto Marlboros	M-Cup	—	—	—	—	—	13	2	9	11	16
1956–57	Rochester Americans	AHL	33	6	17	23	6	—	—	—	—	—
1957–58	Rochester Americans	AHL	27	7	7	14	4	—	—	—	—	—
1957–58	Providence Reds	AHL	44	4	18	22	20	4	1	0	1	2
1958–59	New Westminster Royals	WHL	53	7	13	20	62	—	—	—	—	—
1958–59	Toronto Maple Leafs	NHL	—	—	—	—	—	2	0	0	0	0
1959–60	Rochester Americans	AHL	15	2	3	5	0	—	—	—	—	—
1959–60	Quebec Aces	AHL	49	7	16	23	12	—	—	—	—	—
1960–61	Quebec Aces	AHL	70	10	21	31	55	—	—	—	—	—
1961–62	San Francisco Seals	WHL	16	0	2	2	10	—	—	—	—	—
1961–62	Pittsburgh Hornets	AHL	36	2	9	11	25	—	—	—	—	—
1962–63	Johnstown Jets	EHL	17	2	4	6	11	—	—	—	—	—
1965–66	Galt Hornets	OHA Sr	31	5	12	17	26	—	—	—	—	—
1966–67	Collingwood Georgians	OHA Sr	32	2	13	15	8	—	—	—	—	—
1967–68	Collingwood Kings	OHA Sr	18	3	11	14	8	—	—	—	—	—
AHL totals			274	42	87	129	122	4	1	0	1	2
NHL totals			—	—	—	—	—	2	0	0	0	0
