= 1971 Allan Cup =

Canadian senior ice hockey championship

The Allan Cup trophy

The 1971 Allan Cup was the Canadian senior ice hockey championship for the 1970–71 senior "A" season. The event was hosted by the Galt Hornets and Galt, Ontario. The 1971 playoff marked the 63rd time that the Allan Cup has been awarded.

== Teams ==
- Galt Hornets (Eastern Canadian Champions)
- Calgary Stampeders (Western Canadian Champions)

== Playdowns ==
=== Allan Cup Best-of-Seven Series ===
Galt Hornets 4 - Calgary Stampeders 2
Galt Hornets 7 - Calgary Stampeders 6 (2OT)
Galt Hornets 3 - Calgary Stampeders 2 (2OT)
Galt Hornets 4 - Calgary Stampeders 3

=== Eastern Playdowns ===
Semi-final

Galt Hornets defeated Thunder Bay Twins 3-games-to-1

Galt Hornets 8 - Thunder Bay Twins 5
Galt Hornets 4 - Thunder Bay Twins 3
Thunder Bay Twins 7 - Galt Hornets 2
Galt Hornets 8 - Thunder Bay Twins 1

Final

Galt Hornets defeated Grand Falls Cataracts 3-games-to-2

Galt Hornets 4 - Grand Falls Cataracts 2
Grand Falls Cataracts 6 - Galt Hornets 3
Galt Hornets 5 - Grand Falls Cataracts 2
Grand Falls Cataracts 3 - Galt Hornets 1
Galt Hornets 6 - Grand Falls Cataracts 3

=== Western Playdowns ===
Round Robin

Yorkton Terriers 6 - St. Boniface Mohawks 5
Nelson Maple Leafs 5 - Calgary Stampeders 1
Calgary Stampeders 4 - Yorkton Terriers 0
Nelson Maple Leafs 7 - St. Boniface Mohawks 3
Calgary Stampeders 11 - St. Boniface Mohawks 3
Yorkton Terriers 8 - Nelson Maple Leafs 7

Final

Calgary Stampeders 4 - Nelson Maple Leafs 2
