= Bill Wylie =

Canadian ice hockey player

- Born: July 15, 1928; Galt, Ontario, Canada
- Died: November 24, 1983 (aged 55)
- Height: 5 ft 7 in (170 cm)
- Weight: 145 lb (66 kg; 10 st 5 lb)
- Position: Centre
- Shot: Left
- Played for: New York Rangers
- National team: Canada
- Playing career: 1948–1963

William Vance Wylie (July 15, 1928 — November 24, 1983) was a Canadian professional ice hockey centre who played in one National Hockey League game for the New York Rangers during the 1950–51 season, on January 20, 1951, against the Montreal Canadiens. The rest of his career, which lasted from 1948 to 1963, was spent in various minor leagues. Wylie was also a member of the Galt Terriers senior amateur team that won the Allan Cup in 1961 and represented Canada at the 1962 World Championships.

== Career statistics ==
=== Regular season and playoffs ===
			Regular season					Playoffs
Season	Team	League	GP	G	A	Pts	PIM	GP	G	A	Pts	PIM
1944–45	Brantford Lions	OHA-B	12	10	20	30	4	4	2	1	3	2
1945–46	Brantford Lions	OHA-B	—	—	—	—	—	—	—	—	—	—
1946–47	Galt Red Wings	OHA	24	11	23	34	16	8	3	6	9	0
1947–48	Galt Rockets	OHA	28	26	27	53	10	8	6	10	16	6
1948–49	Quebec Aces	QSHL	55	18	33	51	22	1	0	0	0	2
1949–50	Quebec Aces	QSHL	55	15	24	39	14	12	3	12	15	6
1950–51	New York Rangers	NHL	1	0	0	0	0	—	—	—	—	—
1950–51	New York Rovers	EAHL	48	23	35	58	10	6	1	5	6	0
1950–51	St. Paul Saints	USHL	2	1	1	2	0	—	—	—	—	—
1951–52	Cincinnati Mohawks	AHL	68	21	32	53	10	7	2	3	5	0
1952–53	Vancouver Canucks	WHL	48	9	19	28	4	—	—	—	—	—
1953–54	Vancouver Canucks	WHL	54	13	26	39	6	13	1	6	7	0
1954–55	Vancouver Canucks	WHL	49	9	35	44	4	5	1	2	3	2
1955–56	Vancouver Canucks	WHL	49	13	31	44	14	—	—	—	—	—
1956–57	Vancouver Canucks	WHL	68	18	52	70	16	—	—	—	—	—
1957–58	Kitchener-Waterloo Dutchmen	OHA Sr	50	18	45	63	8	14	6	14	20	0
1957–58	Kitchener-Waterloo Dutchmen	Al-Cup	—	—	—	—	—	5	0	1	1	0
1958–59	Kitchener-Waterloo Dutchmen	OHA Sr	54	20	55	75	4	11	5	9	14	0
1959–60	Kitchener-Waterloo Dutchmen	OHA Sr	20	5	13	18	0	8	0	6	6	0
1960–61	Galt Terriers	OHA Sr	4	4	8	12	2	—	—	—	—	—
1960–61	Galt Terriers	Al-Cup	—	—	—	—	—	12	4	12	16	0
1962–63	Galt Terriers	OHA Sr	9	3	4	7	0	—	—	—	—	—
WHL totals			268	62	163	225	44	18	2	8	10	2
NHL totals			1	0	0	0	0	—	—	—	—	—

=== International ===
Year	Team	Event	GP	G	A	Pts	PIM
1962	Canada	WC	7	2	9	11	0
Senior totals			7	2	9	11	0

== See also ==
- List of players who played only one game in the NHL
