= Helen Varick Boswell =

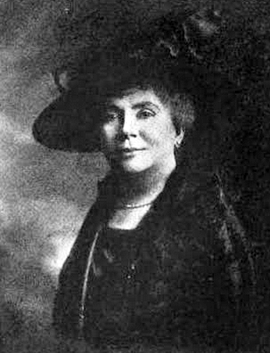
- Helen Varick Boswell, 1921
- Born: July 6, 1869; Baltimore, Maryland, U.S.
- Died: January 5, 1942 (aged 72)
- Education: Washington College of Law
- Occupations: Lawyer; clubwoman

Helen Varick Boswell (July 6, 1869 – January 5, 1942) was a prominent figure in the Woman's National Republican Association and the General Federation of Women's Clubs.

== Life ==
Boswell was born on July 6, 1869, in Baltimore, Maryland. She settled in New York City where she became the protégée of J. Ellen Foster. Foster founded of the Woman's National Republican Association (WRNA) around 1888 and she also served as the organization's first president. While Foster focused on supporting Republican candidates, Boswell supervised advocating for women working in factories and shops.

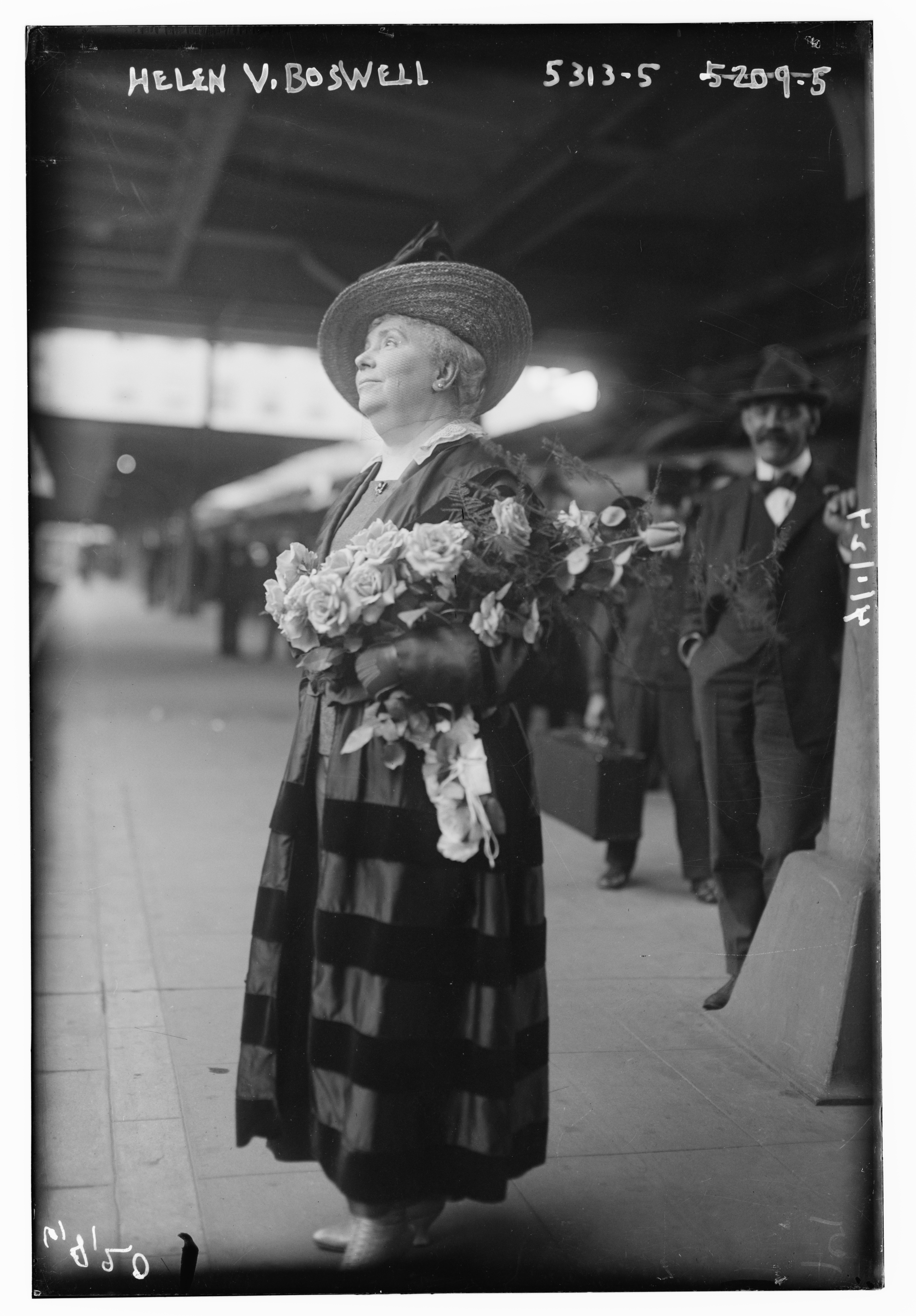
Boswell standing on a train platform.

In 1895 Boswell became chairman of the Woman's Republican Association of New York State. In 1907 she traveled to the Panama Canal Zone under the auspices of then Secretary of War William Howard Taft, where she worked to organize women's clubs for the wives and daughters of American employees.

Boswell obtained a law degree from the Washington College of Law in 1902.

In 1910 Foster died and Boswell became president of the Woman's National Republican Association. She took over the responsibilities of campaigning for Republican candidates, specifically presidential candidates Taft and Charles Evans Hughes. Additionally she served a delegate to the Republican National Conventions from 1920 through 1932.

Boswell was a member of the General Federation of Women's Clubs (GFWC) serving on several committees. She was also a member of the National American Woman Suffrage Association. She was included in the publication Woman's Who's Who of America, 1914-15 and the 1922 publication The History of Woman Suffrage.

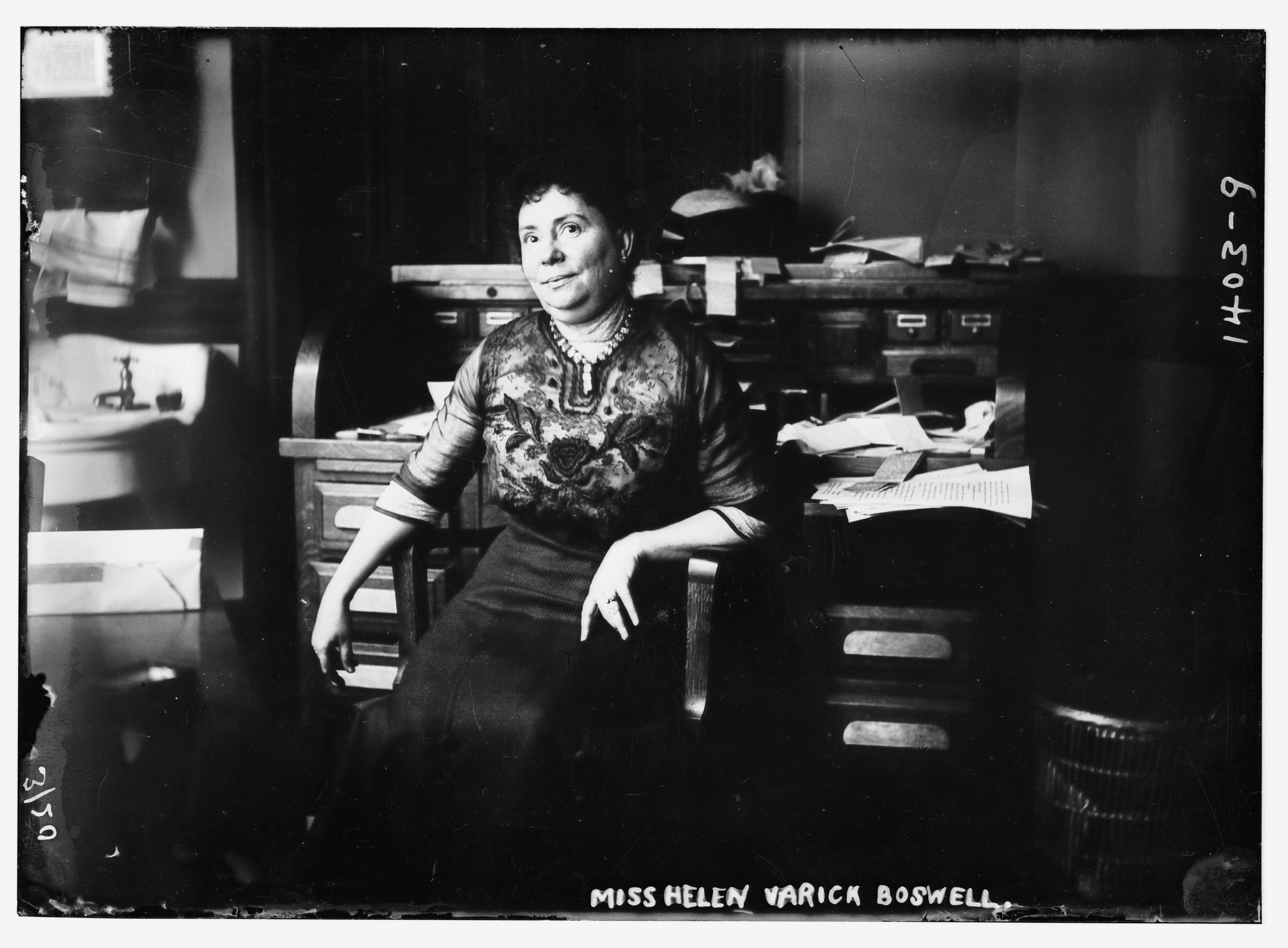

== Death ==
Boswell died on January 5, 1942. She is buried at Woodlawn Cemetery in the Bronx.

== Publications ==
- Women and Prison Labor, 1913
- Promoting Americanization, 1916

== See also ==
- List of suffragists and suffragettes
