= Galt, Ontario =

Suburb of town in southern Ontario, Canada

Galt
- Urban district/ Dissolved City
- Location within Regional Municipality of Waterloo Location within Southern Ontario
- Coordinates: 43°21′29″N 80°18′55″W
- Country: Canada
- Province: Ontario
- Regional municipality: Waterloo
- City: Cambridge
- Settled: 1816
- Incorporated (town): 1857
- Incorporated (city): 1915
- Amalgamated (city): 1973
- Time zone: UTC-5 (EST)
  - Summer (DST): UTC-4 (EDT)
- Forward sortation area: N1R, N1S, N1T, N3C, N3H
- Area codes: 519 and 226
- NTS Map: 40P8 Cambridge
- GNBC Code: FCIKJ

Galt is a community in Cambridge, Ontario, Canada, in the Regional Municipality of Waterloo, Ontario on the Grand River. Prior to 1973, it was an independent city, incorporated in 1915, but amalgamation with the village of Hespeler, the town of Preston and the village of Blair formed the new municipality of Cambridge. Being the largest constituent community in the city, it is commonly seen as the downtown core of Cambridge.

There was considerable resistance among the local population to this "shotgun marriage" arranged by the provincial government and a healthy sense of rivalry had always governed relations among the three communities. Even today, many residents identify Galt, Preston, and Hespeler as still being cities or towns in their own right. Each unique centre has its own history that is well documented in the Cambridge City Archives.

No current population data is available for the former Galt since the Census reports cover only the full area of Cambridge.

The former Galt covers the largest portion of the amalgamated municipality, making up the southern half of the city. It is located on the Grand River and has a very long history as an industrialized area.

== History ==
The area today known as Ontario has been inhabited by Indigenous peoples since end of the last Ice Age. In the south of Galt when preparing for building townhouses near Myers Road in 1989, archaeologists discovered the ruins of a longhouse village dated to between 1280 and 1360 CE. They may have practiced slash and burn agriculture (as was common in the Northeastern Woodlands since 1000 CE) cultivating the Three Sisters and could have been occupied by the Iroquoian speaking Chonnonton Peoples. In the late 17th century, the Algonkian speaking Anishinaabe and Mississauga peoples moved into the territory of southern Ontario.

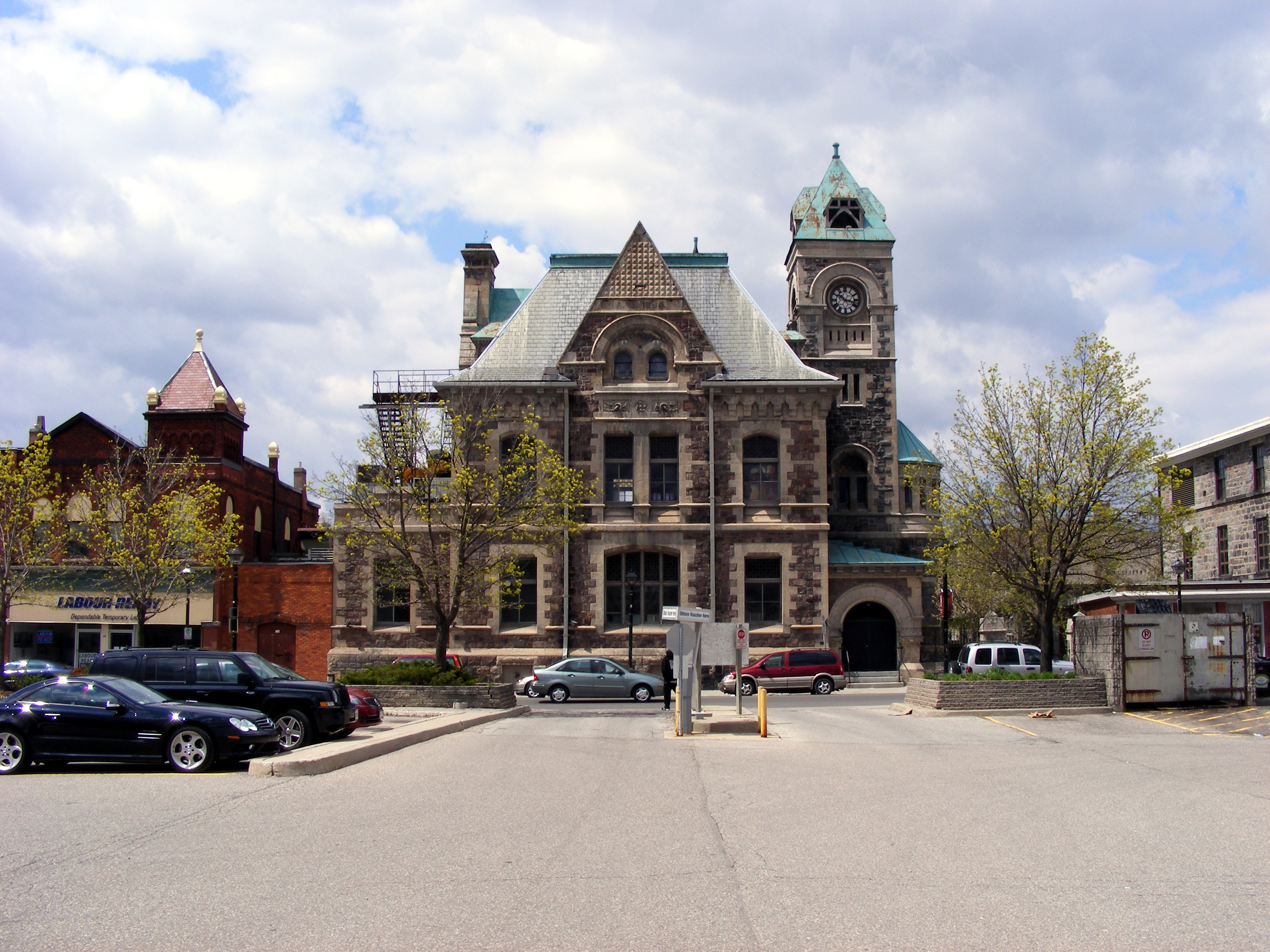
Old Post Office in Galt, built in 1886

Galt is situated on land once granted to the Iroquois people by the British Crown at the end of the American Revolutionary War. In the late 1700s, developers began to buy land around the Grand River from the Six Nations who were led by Joseph Brant. One speculator, William Dickson, a wealthy immigrant from Scotland, bought 90,000 acres (360 km^{2}) of land along the Grand River in 1816; this was later to become Galt and the Dumfries Townships. Dickson divided the land and sold smaller lots, particularly to Scottish settlers. The centre of the planned community was built at the junction of Mill Creek and the Grand River, then called Shade's Mills.

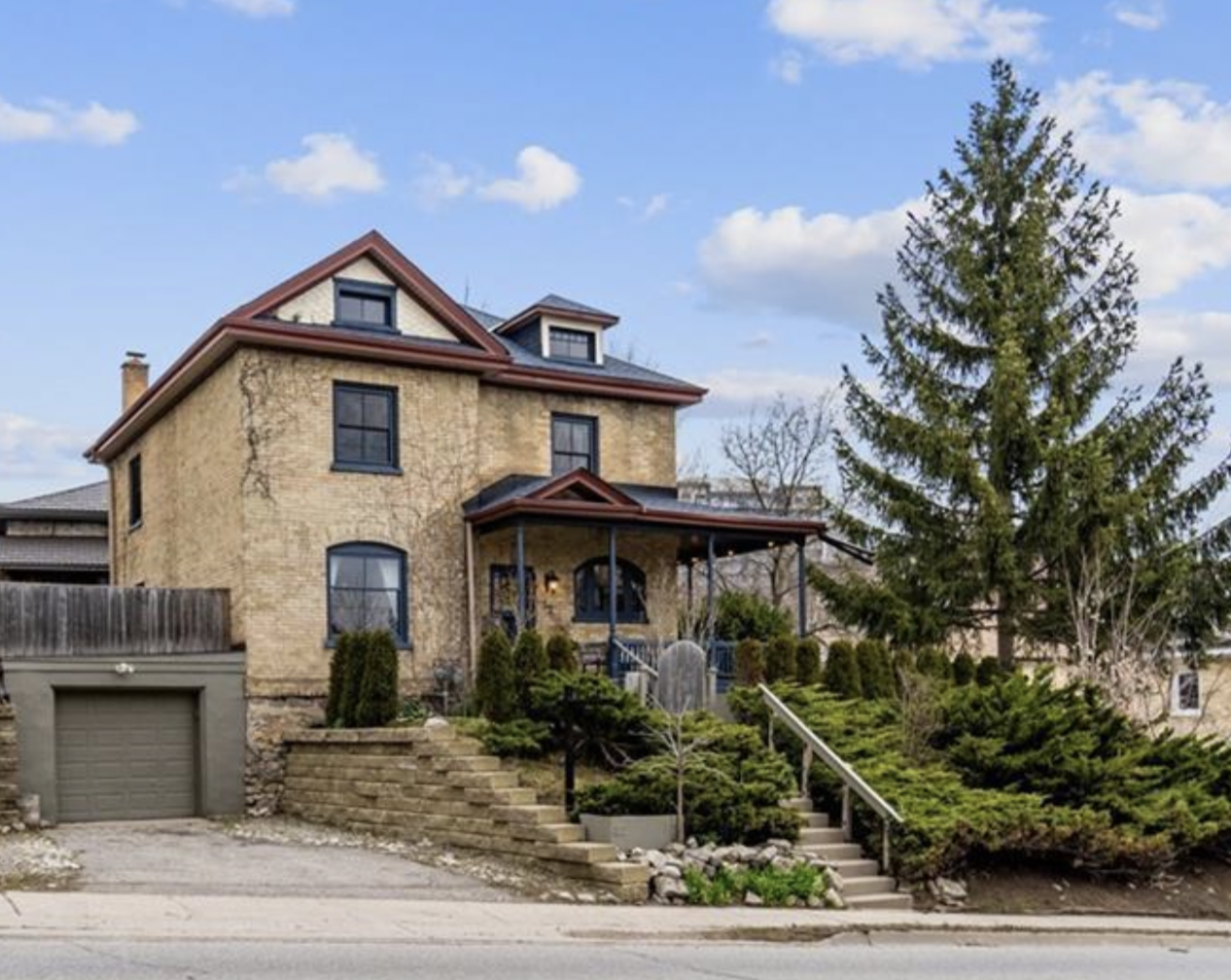
32 Cedar Street in West Galt (Cambridge)

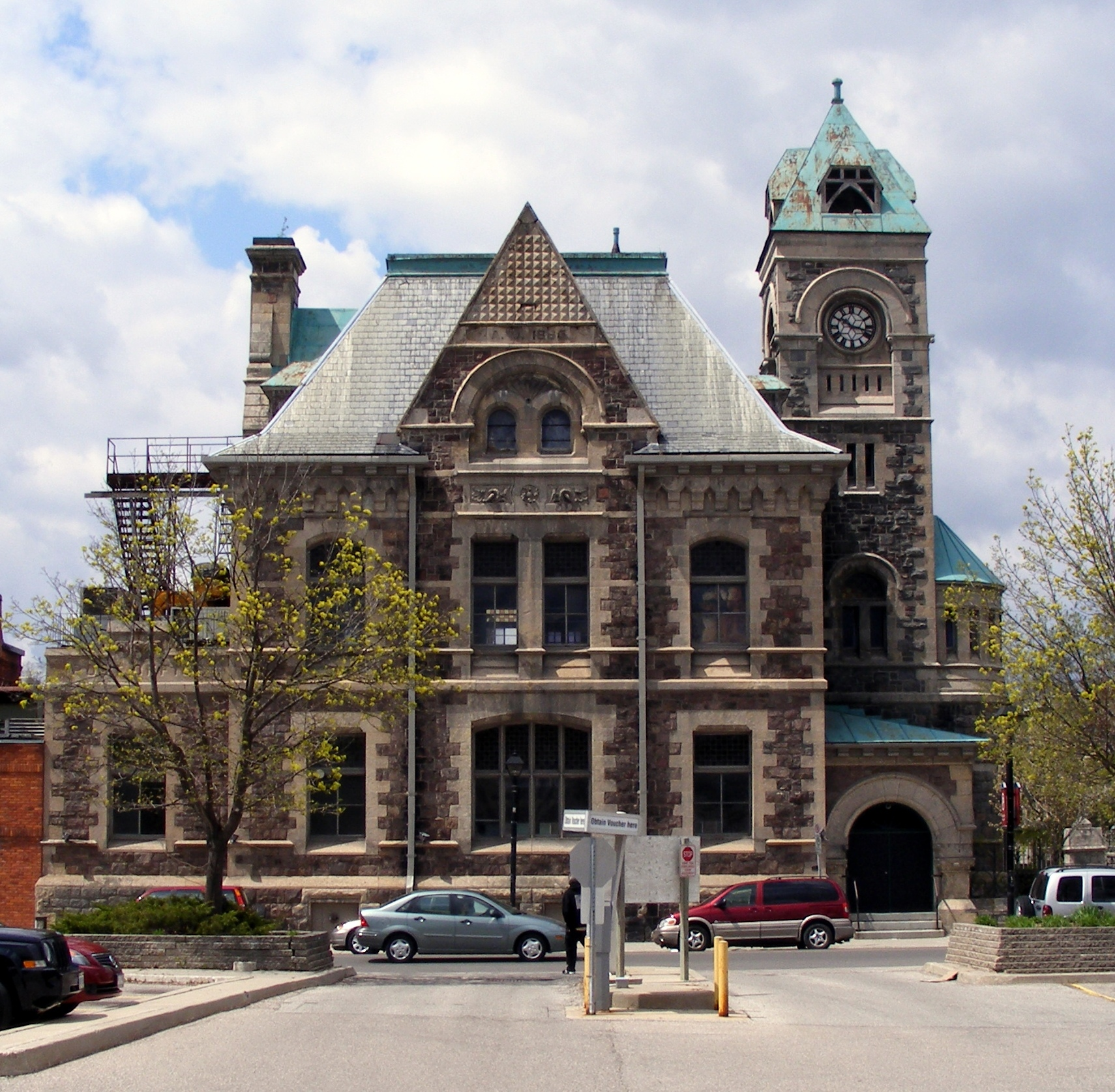
Old Post Office in Galt (Cambridge) built in 1886, renovated in 2016. (2010 photo)

Absalom Shade, a carpenter from Pennsylvania, was hired in 1816 by William Dickson to manage his lands in Dumfries Township. He later operated a general store, a mill and a distillery in Shade's Mills, which later became Galt. In 1819, he built a small bridge over the Grand River to serve customers on the other side; it lasted until 1832. Shade also supplied food and built roads for the Canada Company. He helped establish the Grand River Navigation Company to help transport goods along the river, as well as the Gore Bank in Hamilton. Shade also helped develop railways in the area and was among those who built Galt's Trinity Anglican Church in 1844.

Historical population
Year	Pop.	±%
1871	3,827	—
1881	5,187	+35.5%
1891	7,535	+45.3%
1901	7,866	+4.4%
1911	10,299	+30.9%
1921	13,216	+28.3%
1931	14,006	+6.0%
1941	15,346	+9.6%
1951	19,207	+25.2%
1956	23,738	+23.6%
1961	27,830	+17.2%
1966	33,491	+20.3%
1971	38,897	+16.1%

Dickson decided to name the Post Office Galt, in honour of John Galt of the Canada Company which was developing this entire area. Primarily agricultural in early years, Galt had attracted industry by 1840 and became the largest town in the Grand River area until the early 1900s. Galt was incorporated as a village in 1850, as a town in 1857 and as a city in 1915. Throughout that entire period, it continued to grow based on a large industrial base.

The Canadian Gazetteer of 1846 discussed the community's water power which was essential to power the local industries which were making the area prosperous. At the time the population was about 1000, most originally from Scotland. There were five churches, a weekly newspaper, a fire department, a public library, a bank and a curling club. The post office received mail every day. Industries already in operation included "two grist mills (each containing four run of stones), two saw mills, two foundries, two carding machines and cloth factories, one brewery, two distilleries, one tannery..." A foundry had also opened on Grand Avenue, initially as Dumfries Foundry which would later become Goldie & McCulloch, a major manufacturer of safes, wood working machinery and engines powered by steam or by gasoline. It would continue as a major operation under several other owners until 2000.

The largest of the early schools in the community, the Galt Grammar School, opened in 1852 with William Tassie as headmaster starting in 1853 at the site of what later became the Galt Collegiate. The school gained widespread recognition and attracted students from across North America. By 1872, it had been recognized as a Collegiate Institute.

Galt incorporated as a town on January 1, 1857, with Morris C. Lutz elected as the first mayor. By 1858, a "Town Hall and Market House" had been built with an "Italianate", particularly Tuscan, influence. In later years, the Town Hall became the City Hall and was extensively modified. Galt was incorporated as a city in 1915.

The population in 1869 was 4000 and the community was said to be one of the principal manufacturing locations in Ontario. The railway reached Galt in 1879, increasing the opportunities of exporting local goods and importing others. In 1889, the former Dickson Mill on the Grand River was converted to a hydro electric plant which operated until July 1911 when a power grid from Niagara Falls reached the community.

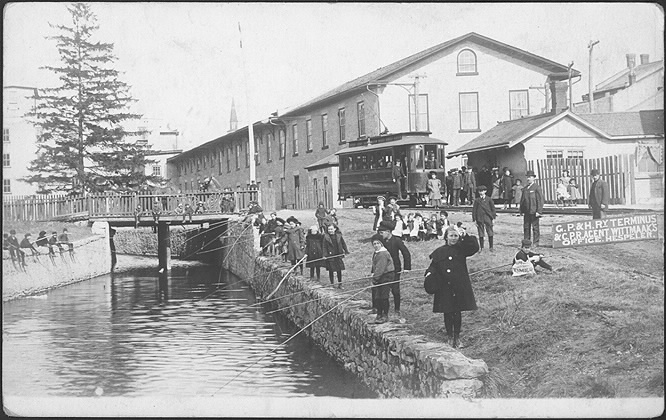
An interurban streetcar connected Galt to Hespeler and nearby Preston.

In the early 1870s, the Credit Valley Railway planned to implement several lines running west and north from Toronto and in 1873, built freight and passenger buildings in Galt. By 1879, the company had installed a bridge crossing the river and in December completed a preliminary test run with a train; it was successful. The CVR venture was not long-lived however, and in 1883, the line was taken over by the Canadian Pacific Railway which built a brick passenger building that still stands.

A new streetcar system, the Galt, Preston and Hespeler electric railway (later called the Grand River Railway Company), would begin operation in 1894, connecting Preston and Galt. In 1911, the line reached Hespeler, Berlin (later called Kitchener) and Waterloo; by 1916 it had been extended to Brantford/Port Dover. The electric rail system ended passenger services in April, 1955.

Not long after Galt had become part of Cambridge, in May 1974, flooding on the Grand River filled city streets with water to a depth of about four feet. In some areas of the downtown core, the depth was 17.4 feet, smashing windows and carrying goods along the streets. Approximately 75 businesses were affected, with virtually none covered by relevant insurance. The flood caused an estimated $5 million in damage.

The Dickson Hill Heritage Conservation District, also known as Old West Galt, is an affluent neighbourhood full of stately homes from the late 19th and early 20th centuries, found on the western side of the Grand River in West Galt.

== Government ==
Since amalgamation local government services are provided by either the City of Cambridge or the Regional Municipality of Waterloo.

The local government is the Cambridge City Council consisting of a mayor and eight councillors, each representing a ward.

Cambridge is also represented on the higher-tier Waterloo Regional Council which consists of the Regional Chair, the Mayors of the seven cities and townships, and eight additional Councilors - four from Kitchener and two each from Cambridge and Waterloo. Galt contains the Cambridge City Hall as well as the historic Galt City Hall.

Galt is part of the Cambridge Federal Electoral District and the Cambridge Ontario Electoral District.

== Municipal services ==
=== Public transportation ===
Since 2000, local and regional transit throughout the Region of Waterloo has been provided by Grand River Transit (GRT), which was created by a merger of the former Cambridge Transit and Kitchener Transit.

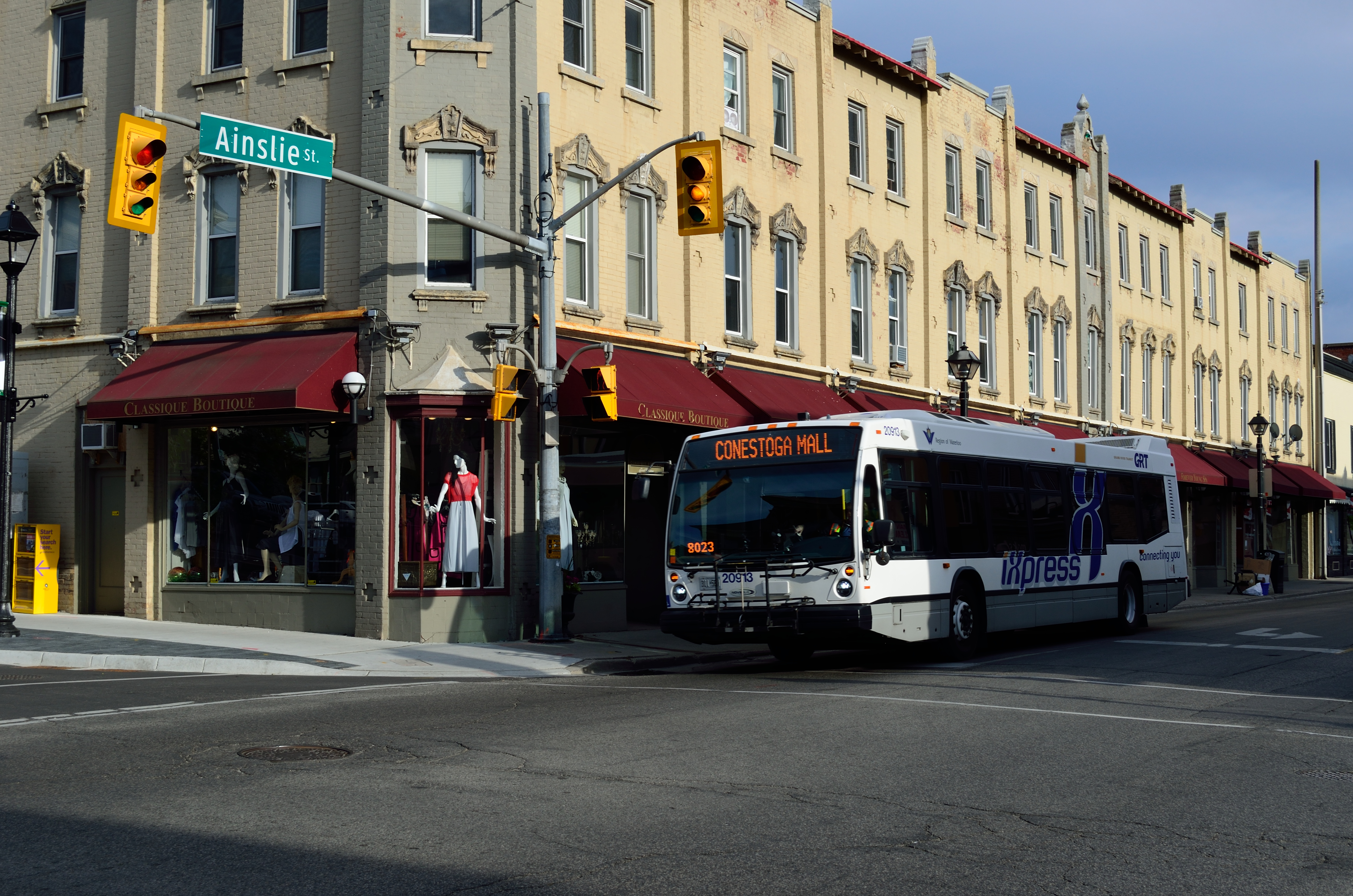
The Grand River Transit 200 iXpress bus in downtown Galt in 2015. Within Cambridge, the route has since been replaced by the 302 ION Bus.

Bus routes run from Galt to other parts of Cambridge and to South Kitchener. The Ainslie St. Transit Terminal is in Galt and is the main transit hub in Cambridge and the southern terminus of GRT's 302 Express bus route. This is expected to be replaced by Phase 2 of the ION Light rail project.

== Education ==
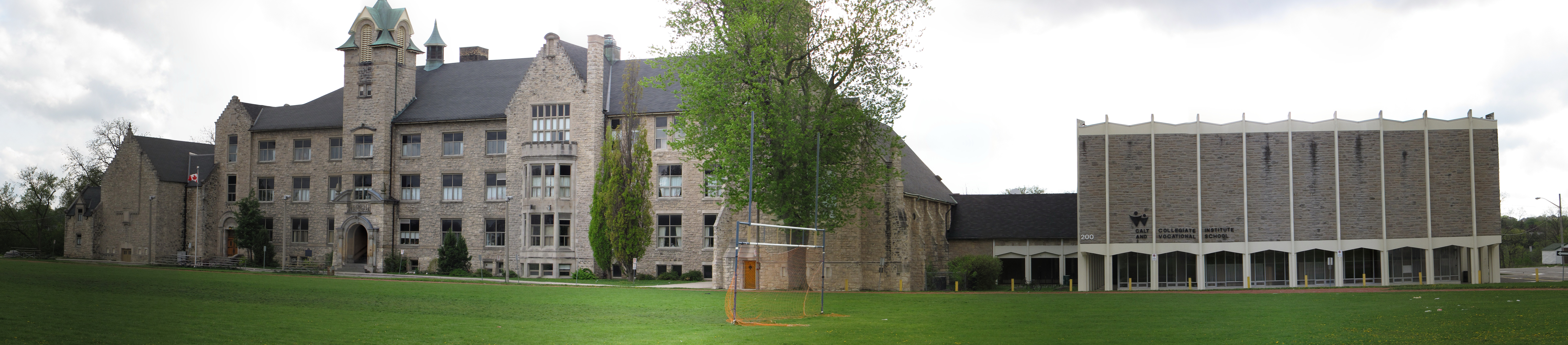
Galt Collegiate Institute, one of the oldest public high schools in Ontario.

Public English-language schooling is provided by the Waterloo Region District School Board. The most notable high school in Galt is the Galt Collegiate Institute and Vocational School, which is over 150 years old.

Publicly funded Catholic education is available through schools operated by the Waterloo Catholic District School Board.

The University of Waterloo School of Architecture campus is located in Galt in the Riverside Silk Mill, also known as the Tiger Brand Building. Inside there is a theatre, a fitness room, and the gallery "Design at Riverside", which is one of two publicly funded galleries dedicated to architecture in Canada. The School of Architecture provides classes to around 380 students within the Galt community.

== Notable people ==
- Margaret Avison (1918–2007), Canadian poet
- Florence Carlyle (1864–1923), figure and portrait artist
- John Bell Gourlay (1872–1949), Canadian Olympic footballer and gold medal winner
- Parnell Orde Gourlay (1879–1958), Canadian Olympic footballer and gold medal winner
- Gordon Guggisberg (1869–1930), army officer and colonial administrator
- C. Ernst Harth (b. 1970), character actor and producer
- Herschel Henlere (1890–1968), vaudeville and music hall pianist
- Julia K. Jaffray (1878–1941), social worker clubwoman, prison reformer
- Don Laurence (b. 1957), professional hockey player
- James Paris Lee (1831–1904), childhood town of co-inventor of a prototype bolt action rifle
- John Lee (1833–1907), childhood town of co-inventor of a prototype bolt action rifle
- William Gordon Mackendrick (1864-1959), soldier and author
- William Lash Miller (1866–1940), Canadian chemist
- Mike Moffat (b. 1962), ice hockey goaltender
- Georgina Fraser Newhall (1860–1932), writer of poetry and short stories
- Gord Renwick (1935–2021), ice hockey administrator
- Ron Shaver (b. 1951), figure skating champion

== See also ==
- Grand River Railway
- Grand River Transit
- Grand Trunk Railway
- Great Western Railway
- Haldimand Proclamation
- Highway 401
- Quebec City–Windsor Corridor
- Regional Municipality of Waterloo
- Speed River
