= Thunder Bay K&A Twins =

Canadian Senior ice hockey team

Thunder Bay Twins
- City: Thunder Bay, Ontario
- League: Hockey Northwestern Ontario
- Founded: 2007
- Folded: 2011
- Home arena: Fort William Gardens
- Colours: Green, Yellow, and White
- General manager: JP Heino
- Head coach: Dave Olenik

Franchise history
- 2007-2008: Thunder Bay Hawks
- 2008-11: Thunder Bay Twins

The Thunder Bay Twins were a Canadian Senior ice hockey team from Thunder Bay, Ontario. They played an independent schedule under the supervision of Hockey Northwestern Ontario. They competed for the Allan Cup, the Grand Championship of Canadian senior hockey.

== History ==
The Thunder Bay Bombers folded in 2006, after a tour of Europe and winning the 2005 Allan Cup.

In 2007-08 a new team emerged: the Thunder Bay Hawks. They dispatched the Thistles in the region final 2-games-to-none, but then fell to the MLH's Dundas Real McCoys in the Renwick Cup.

In the summer of 2008, the team rebranded itself as the Thunder Bay Twins. The Twins entered the 2008-09 playoffs against the Kenora Thistles with only a best-of-3 series standing between them and berth in the 2009 Allan Cup. The Thistles drew first blood, winning Game 1 5–4 in double-overtime. Game 2 went the Twins way with an easy 7–2 victory. Game 3 was a battle for the ages, as the Thistles dominated early and led 3–2 at the start of the third period. The Twins tied up the game late and forced overtime. In the second overtime period, the Twins scored to take the game and the series. As there will be no Renwick Cup series against Major League Hockey this year, the Twins will at the 2009 Allan Cup, their first appearance since winning the 2005 Allan Cup.

In March 2010, the Twins competed for the HNO Gary Cook Cup senior hockey championship in Kenora, Ontario. The Twins blew a 5–0 lead to tie game one 5–5 against the upstart Fort Frances Thunderhawks, a result they would later protest and would be turned into a Twins victory. In the second game, the Twins were beat soundly by their rival Kenora Thistles 5–1. Due to the protest by the Twins, Fort Frances was eliminated from the tournament and the Twins moved on to the finals. The Thistles beat the Twins again, 3–1, to win the Gary Cook Cup.

As of 2010-11 the team is on hiatus and looking for new ownership.

== Season-by-season standings ==
Season	GP	W	L	T	OTL	GF	GA	Points	Finish	Playoffs
2009-10	8	5	3	-	0	37	28	10	2nd HNO	Lost HNO Final
