= Keli Corpse =

Canadian ice hockey player and coach

- Born: May 14, 1974 (age 51) London, Ontario, Canada
- Height: 5 ft 11 in (180 cm)
- Weight: 175 lb (79 kg; 12 st 7 lb)
- Position: Centre
- Shot: Left
- Played for: AHL; Fredericton Canadiens; Baltimore Bandits; ECHL; Wheeling Thunderbirds; Wheeling Nailers; Pensacola Ice Pilots; IHL; Grand Rapids Griffins; Fort Wayne Komets; UHL; Fort Wayne Komets; Port Huron Border Cats; Rockford IceHogs; Quad City Mallards; Adirondack IceHawks; CHL; Border City Bandits
- National team: Canada
- NHL draft: 44th overall, 1992; Montreal Canadiens
- Playing career: 1994–2005

Keli Corpse (born May 14, 1974) is a Canadian former professional ice hockey player. He subsequently became the head coach of the Ayr Centennials of the Southern Ontario Junior Hockey League. Corpse was selected by the Montreal Canadiens in the 2nd round (44th overall) of the 1992 NHL Entry Draft.

Born in 1974 in London, Ontario, Corpse played in the Ontario Hockey League with the Kingston Frontenacs. He also played with the Canada men's national ice hockey team during the 1992-1993 and 1994-1995 seasons.

== Career statistics ==
			Regular season					Playoffs
Season	Team	League	GP	G	A	Pts	PIM	GP	G	A	Pts	PIM
1990–91	Kingston Frontenacs	OHL	58	18	33	51	34	—	—	—	—	—
1991–92	Kingston Frontenacs	OHL	65	31	52	83	20	—	—	—	—	—
1992–93	Kingston Frontenacs	OHL	54	32	75	107	45	16	9	20	29	10
1993–94	Kingston Frontenacs	OHL	63	42	84	126	55	6	1	7	8	2
1994–95	Kingston Frontenacs	OHL	25	12	41	53	6	6	4	9	13	10
1995–96	Wheeling Thunderbirds	ECHL	63	32	62	94	40	6	0	4	4	4
1995–96	Fredericton Canadiens	AHL	5	0	1	1	0	—	—	—	—	—
1996–97	Wheeling Thunderbirds	ECHL	24	12	17	29	10	—	—	—	—	—
1996–97	Baltimore Bandits	AHL	2	0	1	1	2	—	—	—	—	—
1996–97	Grand Rapids Griffins	IHL	19	3	4	7	2	—	—	—	—	—
1996–97	Fort Wayne Komets	IHL	33	4	15	19	26	—	—	—	—	—
1997–98	EHC Straubing	Germany3	16	13	18	31	62	—	—	—	—	—
1997–98	HC Merano	Italy	26	17	19	36	44	—	—	—	—	—
1998–99	Pensacola Ice Pilots	ECHL	43	8	29	37	14	—	—	—	—	—
1998–99	Wheeling Nailers	ECHL	30	7	23	30	18	—	—	—	—	—
1999–00	Fort Wayne Komets	UHL	69	27	67	94	26	13	6	9	15	4
2000–01	Border City Bandits	CHL	16	5	14	19	10	—	—	—	—	—
2000–01	Fort Wayne Komets	UHL	54	16	39	55	35	7	6	0	6	0
2001–02	Port Huron Border Cats	UHL	19	6	10	16	4	—	—	—	—	—
2001–02	Rockford IceHogs	UHL	14	3	19	22	0	—	—	—	—	—
2001–02	Quad City Mallards	UHL	27	8	22	30	24	—	—	—	—	—
2001–02	Adirondack IceHawks	UHL	10	2	7	9	4	2	2	0	2	2
2002–03	Tillsonburg Vipers	OHA-Sr.	30	14	47	61	2	—	—	—	—	—
2003–04	Tillsonburg Vipers	OHA-Sr.	32	22	54	76	32	—	—	—	—	—
2004–05	Tillsonburg Vipers	MLH	18	9	28	37	0	—	—	—	—	—
ECHL totals			160	59	131	190	82	6	0	4	4	4

== Awards and honours ==
Award	Year
OHL Humanitarian of the Year	1992–93
CHL Humanitarian of the Year	1992–93
John A. Daley Memorial Trophy – ECHL Rookie of the Year	1995–96
