= Fort Frances Thunderhawks =

- City: Fort Frances, Ontario
- League: Hockey Northwestern Ontario
- Founded: 2009
- Folded: 2012
- Home arena: Fort Frances Memorial Sports Center
- Colours: Red, Black, and White
- General manager: Kevin Webb and Travis Green
- Head coach: Gary Noga

The Fort Frances Thunderhawks were a Canadian Senior ice hockey club from Fort Frances, Ontario. They were eligible to compete for the Allan Cup.

== History ==
The Thunderhawks were founded in 2009 and are the namesake of the Fort Frances Borderland Thunder, a former local team that played in the Superior International Junior Hockey League.

The expansion of the Thunderhawks into the Northwestern Ontario region puts them in direct competition with the already established Kenora Thistles and the 2005 Allan Cup Champion Thunder Bay K&A Twins. Additionally, a third team in the region allows for the potential for the first senior league in the region since the 1980s.

On November 10, 2009, the Thunderhawks played their first ever game. In Fort Frances, the Thunderhawks dropped a 7-6 decision in a shootout to the Kenora Thistles. At the event they honoured local Senior history with an opening ceremony celebrating the 1952 Allan Cup victory by the Fort Frances Canadians. On December 4, 2009, the Thunderhawks celebrated their first ever win by defeating the Thunder Bay K&A Twins 6-5 at home.

The Thunderhawks entered the 2010 HNO Gary Cook Cup tournament on March 11, 2010 for the regional senior championship. In their first game they tied the Kenora Thistles 3-3. The next night the Thunderhawks trailed the Thunder Bay K&A Twins 5-0 in the third period, only to rally and tie the Twins 5-5. It looked as if the Thunderhawks (0-0-2) would be a surprise berth into the tournament final, but at the last minute the Twins filed a protest over a Thunderhawks player. The protest was upheld by the HNO who overturned both of Fort Frances's results, despite the issue seeming to be a clerical error done by the HNO itself, which eliminated the Thunderhawks from the tournament.

Despite losing in the semi-final of the 2011 Allan Cup, the Thunderhawks were informed in June 2011 that Hockey Northwestern Ontario had awarded them the Gary Cook Cup as branch champions because of their win over Kenora in the tournament quarter-final. Also, the Thunderhawks were awarded the Renwick Cup as Ontario Senior hockey champions over the Dundas Real McCoys for advancing further in the tournament.

In 2011-12, the Thunderhawks could not get enough player commitment and folded just before their final regular season game against Kenora.

The team was believed to be sold to a retirement community in South Florida for the start of the 2012-13 season according to veteran player/coach Reg Dunlop.

== Season-by-season standings ==
Season	GP	W	L	T	OTL	GF	GA	Points	Finish	Playoffs
2009-10	10	3	6	-	1	29	56	7	3rd HNO	Lost Round Robin
2010-11	5	1	3	-	1	18	25	3	2nd HNO	Won Gary Cook Cup, Won Renwick Cup
2011-12	2	1	1	-	0	5	15	2	2nd HNO	Withdrew

== See also ==
- Renwick Cup
- Allan Cup
