= Renwick Cup =

- Sport: Ice hockey
- Awarded for: Senior "AAA" ice hockey championship for Ontario.
- Country: Canada

The Gordon Renwick Cup is the trophy for the Senior "AAA" Central Canada ice hockey championship. The winning of this trophy earns the champion the right to compete in the Allan Cup, the national Senior 'AAA' Championship. It is named after former Canadian Amateur Hockey Association president Gord Renwick, who had ties to senior ice hockey with the Galt Hornets.

== History ==
The Renwick Cup dates back to at least 1990. Originally, the Renwick Cup championship was followed by an Eastern Canada Championship known as the Bolton Cup, but in recent years that championship has been dropped in favor of the round robin format at the Allan Cup.

The championship is played between the champions of the Ontario Hockey Federation (OHF) and Hockey Northwestern Ontario (HNO). The OHF champion is determined by the winner of the Allan Cup Hockey league in Southern Ontario. The HNO championship is determined by playoffs amongst teams from larger towns in northwestern Ontario like Thunder Bay, Kenora, and Fort Frances. In some years, HNO has not submitted a champion or been given its own spot in the Allan Cup when another region has withdrawn.

The Renwick Cup series was not played in 2016 and 2017, after the Kenora Thistles folded.

== Champions ==
2015 Dundas Real McCoys
2014 Dundas Real McCoys
2013 Kenora Thistles
2012 Kenora Thistles
2011 Fort Frances Thunderhawks
2010 Dundas Real McCoys
2009 No Champion
2008 Dundas Real McCoys
2007 Whitby Dunlops
2006 Whitby Dunlops
2005 Thunder Bay Bombers
2004 Aylmer Blues
2003 Cambridge Hornets
2002 St-Georges Garaga*
2001 Dundas Real McCoys*
2000 St-Georges Garaga*
1999 London MacMaster Chevys*
1998 London Admirals*
1997 Bothwell Bullets
1996 Ohsweken Riverhawks

(*) Denotes winner of Bolton Cup as Eastern Canadian Champions.
