= 2011 Allan Cup =

Canadian senior ice hockey championship

The Allan Cup trophy

The 2011 Allan Cup was the Canadian championship of senior ice hockey. This was the 103rd year the Allan Cup was awarded. The 2011 Allan Cup was contended in Kenora, Ontario, hosted by the Kenora Thistles of Hockey Northwestern Ontario from April 11 to April 16, 2011.

Newfoundland and Labrador's Clarenville Caribous went 4 wins, no losses in the tournament, defeating the Alberta's Bentley Generals 5–3 in the final to win Newfoundland and Labrador's 2nd ever National Senior AAA crown, the first since the Corner Brook Royals at the 1986 Allan Cup.

== Participants ==
- Kenora Thistles (Host)
  - 4-1-0-0 Branch record (1st in Hockey Northwestern Ontario).
  - Automatic entry as host.
- Fort Frances Thunderhawks (Northwestern Ontario)
  - 1-3-0-1 Branch record (2nd in Hockey Northwestern Ontario).
  - Granted Quebec's spot in Allan Cup.
- Clarenville Caribous (Atlantic)
  - 14-10-0-0 Regular season record (2nd in West Coast Senior Hockey League).
  - Lost to Deer Lake Red Wings 4-games-to-2 in Semi-final.
  - Only registered Sr. AAA team in Atlantic.
- Bentley Generals (Pacific)
  - 19-1-0-0 Regular season record (1st in Chinook Hockey League).
  - Defeated Stony Plain Eagles 4-games-to-none, defeated Fort Saskatchewan Chiefs 4-games-to-none to win Alberta Crown.
  - Defeated Fort St. John Flyers 3-games-to-2 for McKenzie Cup.
- South East Prairie Thunder (West)
  - 6-1-0-0 Provincial round robin record (1st in Hockey Manitoba).
  - Defeated Île-des-Chênes North Stars 4-games-to-1 to win Pattison Cup.
  - Defeated Lloydminster Border Kings 3-games-to-none to win Rathgaber Cup.
- Dundas Real McCoys (Ontario)
  - 11-9-3-1 Regular season record (3rd in Major League Hockey).
  - Defeated Brantford Blast 4-games-to-2, defeated Norwood Vipers 4-games-to-3 to win Robertson Cup.

== Map of teams ==
Host team Pacific participant West participant
Northwestern Ontario participant Central participant Atlantic participant

== Round robin ==
Allan Cup Round Robin
Division One
| Rank | Team | Region | W–L–T | GF | GA |
| 1 | Clarenville Caribous | Atlantic | 2–0–0 | 6 | 3 |
| 2 | South East Prairie Thunder | Western | 1–1–0 | 8 | 6 |
| 3 | Fort Frances Thunderhawks | NW Ontario | 0–2–0 | 4 | 9 |
Division Two
| Rank | Team | Region | W–L–T | GF | GA |
| 1 | Bentley Generals | Pacific | 2–0–0 | 7 | 5 |
| 2 | Kenora Thistles | Host | 1–1–0 | 8 | 4 |
| 3 | Dundas Real McCoys | Ontario | 0–2–0 | 4 | 10 |

=== Results ===
Round Robin results
| Game | Home team | Score | Away team | Score | Notes |
| 1 | Fort Frances Thunderhawks | 3 | South East Prairie Thunder | 6 | Final |
| 2 | Kenora Thistles | 6 | Dundas Real McCoys | 1 | Final |
| 3 | Clarenville Caribous | 3 | Fort Frances Thunderhawks | 1 | Final |
| 4 | Dundas Real McCoys | 3 | Bentley Generals | 4 | Final |
| 5 | South East Prairie Thunder | 2 | Clarenville Caribous | 3 | Final |
| 6 | Bentley Generals | 3 | Kenora Thistles | 2 | Final |

== Championship Round ==
=== Quarter and Semi-finals ===
Quarter and Semi-final results
| Game | Home team | Score | Away team | Score | Notes |
| QF1 | South East Prairie Thunder | 0 | Dundas Real McCoys | 3 | Final |
| QF2 | Kenora Thistles | 3 | Fort Frances Thunderhawks | 5 | Final |
| SF1 | Clarenville Caribous | 4 | Dundas Real McCoys | 0 | Final |
| SF2 | Bentley Generals | 7 | Fort Frances Thunderhawks | 2 | Final |

=== Final ===
| Allan Cup final: Game / Home team / Score / Away team / Score / Notes; F / Clarenville Caribous / 5 / Bentley Generals / 3 / Final |
