= Kenora Thistles (senior) =

- City: Kenora, Ontario
- League: Hockey Northwestern Ontario
- Operated: 2006-2016
- Home arena: Kenora Recreational Centre
- Colours: Red, Black, and White

The Kenora Thistles were a Canadian senior ice hockey club from Kenora, Ontario. The club most recently played in the 2015–16 season in the Hockey Northwestern Ontario and were hosts of the 2011 Allan Cup.

== History ==
Founded in 2006, the Kenora Thistles were one of only two teams in their area, the other being the Thunder Bay Twins. Both the Thistles and Twins played a series of exhibition games against Manitoba and Saskatchewan senior clubs to stay ready during the winter as they have no official league play until the playoffs. In the spring, the Thistles and Thunder Bay traditionally met in a best-of-3 series to determine the Ontario Hockey Association champion for the Renwick Cup.

In the 2007 playoffs, the Thunder Bay Bombers defaulted due to lack of money despite winning the Allan Cup in 2005 and traveling Europe in 2006 to play against professional European clubs. Taking up an old, forgotten tradition of the Allan Cup champion. With no Northern Ontario competition, the Kenora earned the right to compete in the Renwick Cup and as well to host it. But, the Thistles did not book ice time in time and the Town of Kenora would not alter their schedule, so Hockey Canada stripped Kenora of hosting rights and awarded them to the eventual OHA champion, who ended up being the Whitby Dunlops of the Eastern Ontario Senior Hockey League. Kenora led the first game of the best-of-3 1–0 and 2–1. Whitby stormed back and led 3–2. Kenora tied the game in the third just to have the Dunlops score a late one to take game one 4–3. Kenora was outshot 50–29. In game two, the Dunlops taught the Thistles a lesson, crushing them 11–0 to take the series 2–games-to-none.

In 2008, the Thistles returned for more playoff action after an extensive exhibition schedule. Thunder Bay was back under the name Thunder Bay Hawks HC. The Hawks won both games of the Northern final: 7–4 and 5–1 to advance to the Renwick Cup.

The 2008–09 season was spent with a short exhibition schedule against other Senior teams in Manitoba and Saskatchewan. These games included a pair against Theoren Fleury's Steinbach North Stars, hosts of the 2009 Allan Cup. The playoffs began for the Thistles on March 13 against the Thunder Bay Twins. Two victories would take the Thistles directly to the 2009 Allan Cup round robin for the first time ever. Playing in Thunder Bay, the Thistles struck first with a 5–4 double-overtime victory. The next evening the Twins struck back, taking Game 2 by a 7–2 score. The Thistles dominated early and took a 3–2 lead into the third period. Late in the game the Twins tied the score at 3 and forced overtime. In the second overtime period, the Twins scored to win 4–3 and ended the Thistles third season of play.

From March 11 to 14, 2010, the Thistles hosted the HNO Gary Cook Cup senior hockey championship. The Thistles tied their first game against the Fort Frances Thunderhawks 3–3, a result that would later be overturned and awarded to the Thistles. Their second game was a 5–1 drubbing of their rival Thunder Bay K&A Twins. Due to the same protest that changed the result of their game against the Thunderhawks, the Thistles met the Twins again in the tournament final. The Thistles were victorious, taking the Twins 3-1. The will move on to the Renwick Cup in April against the winners of Major League Hockey.

The Thistles and the City of Kenora hosted the 2011 Allan Cup on behalf of Hockey Northwestern Ontario. They lost the quarter-final to the Fort Frances Thunderhawks. The Thunderhawks were awarded the branch championship Gary Cook Cup for the victory. In June 2011, the team officially folded, but were resurrected by a new owner before the month was out.

In 2012, the Thistles won the Renwick Cup in Dundas, defeating the Dundas Real McCoys two games to none and advanced to the Allan Cup in Lloydminster, Alberta. The Thistles went 3 and 0, losing in the quarter-final to Rosetown, Saskatchewan. In 2013, the Thistles won the Renwick cup for a second straight year defeated the Brantford Blast two games to none in Kenora and advanced to the Allan Cup in Red Deer, Alberta, losing in the semi-final 3–2 to the eventual Allan Cup Champions, Bentley Generals.

The Thistles were to host the 2017 Allan Cup in Kenora; however the tournament was moved after the hockey club ceased operations on January 10, 2016. With the demise of the Thistles, Northwestern Ontario has no senior hockey clubs left competing for the Renwick Cup.

== Season-by-season standings ==
Season	GP	W	L	T	OTL	GF	GA	Points	Finish	Playoffs
2009-10	10	6	3	-	1	47	29	13	1st HNO	Won Gary Cook Cup
2010-11	5	4	1	-	0	25	18	8	1st HNO	Lost AC Quarter-final
2011-12	2	1	1	-	0	15	5	2	1st HNO	Won RC, lost AC Quarter-final
2012-13	14	10	4	0	0	84	40	32	Exh Sched	Won RC, lost AC Semi-final

== Allan Cup results ==
Season	Location	GP	W	L	T	OTL	GF	GA	Results	Playoffs
2011	Kenora, Ontario	3	1	2	0	0	11	9	2nd Pool Two	Lost quarter-final
2012	Lloydminster, Saskatchewan	3	0	3	0	0	9	17	3rd Pool Two	Lost quarter-final
2013	Red Deer, Alberta	4	1	3	0	0	12	18	3rd Pool Two	Lost semi-final

== See also ==
- Renwick Cup
- Allan Cup
