= Spokane Flyers =

Spokane Flyers could mean:

- Spokane Flyers (senior), a former senior ice hockey team in the Western International Hockey League
- Spokane Flyers (1974–1980), the second former senior ice hockey team in the Western International Hockey League
- Spokane Flyers (junior), a former junior ice hockey team in the Western Hockey League
