= 1980 Allan Cup =

Canadian senior ice hockey championship

The Allan Cup trophy

The 1980 Allan Cup was the Canadian senior ice hockey championship for the 1979–80 senior "A" season. The event was hosted by the Spokane Flyers in Spokane, Washington. The 1980 playoff marked the 72nd time that the Allan Cup has been awarded.

The 1980 Allan Cup was the fourth Allan Cup championship to be hosted by an American city.

== Teams ==
- Cambridge Hornets (Eastern Canadian Champions)
- Spokane Flyers (Western Canadian Champions)

== Best-of-Seven Series ==
Spokane Flyers 5 - Cambridge Hornets 3
Spokane Flyers 2 - Cambridge Hornets 1
Spokane Flyers 5 - Cambridge Hornets 2
Spokane Flyers 4 - Cambridge Hornets 3
