= South Eastern Manitoba Hockey League =

Ice hockey league in Manitoba, Canada

- Sport: Senior ice hockey
- Founded: 1951
- Commissioner: Tom Vatrt
- No. of teams: 8
- Most recent champion: Winkler Royals (2026)
- Most titles: Morden Redskins (13)
- Website: semhl.net

The South Eastern Manitoba Hockey League (SEMHL) is a senior men's ice hockey league in Manitoba, Canada. It was founded in 1951. The SEMHL is affiliated with Hockey Manitoba, the provincial branch of Hockey Canada.

== Teams ==
During its existence, 33 different teams from across southern Manitoba and Minnesota have played in the league at one time or another. As of the 2026, the league consists of eight teams.

Name	Home	Active since	Championships
Carman Beavers	Carman	1963	10
Île-des-Chênes North Stars	Île-des-Chênes	2022	0
Morden Bombers (Note: The current Morden Bombers were formerly the Morden Redskins from 1983–2020; not to be confused with the original Morden Bombers (1968–1983))	Morden	1983	13
Notre Dame Hawks	Notre-Dame-de-Lourdes	2004	3
Red River Wild	St. Jean Baptiste	2022	0
Springfield Winterhawks	Oakbank	2024	0
Warren Mercs	Warren	2005	2
Winkler Royals	Winkler	2013	4

=== Defunct Teams ===
- Altona Maroons (1951–2024)
- Dominion City Flyers (1956–1957, 1969–1970)
- Elm Creek Kernels (1978–1982)
- Emerson Athletics (1951–1958)
- Letellier Rogues (1951–1954)
- Manitou Mercurys (1966–1969)
- Miami Rockets (1952–1967)
- Morden Bombers (1959–1963, 1968–1983)
- Morris Stampeders (1951–1991)
- Oakville Seals (1968–1974, 2005–2012)
- Pilot Mound Pilots (1955–1991)
- Plum Coulee Xpress (2002–2013)
- Portage Hawks (1983–1998)
- Portage Islanders (2015–2026)
- Portage Pirates (2000–2001)
- Portage Plainsmen (1959–1963)
- Red River Rebels (1973–1976)
- St. Andrews Aces (1988–89)
- St. Jean Flyers (1951–1956)
- Starbuck Black Sheep (1995–1998)
- Ste Anne Aces (2022–2025)
- Stonewall Flyers (2006–2015, 2016–2017)
- Swan Lake Cougars (1993–1999)
- Warroad Lakers (1984–1987, 1989–1990, 1994–1997)
- Winnipeg Wise Guys (2000–2001)

== League championships ==
The Elmer Hildebrand Trophy is awarded to the league champion each season. The SEMHL champion qualifies for the Manitoba Senior 'A' Provincial Championship and competes against the champions from Manitoba's other senior leagues.

=== Champions ===
- 1952 - Altona Maroons
- 1953 - St. Jean Flyers
- 1954 - St. Jean Flyers
- 1955 - Altona Maroons
- 1956 - Altona Maroons
- 1957 - Winkler Royals
- 1958 - Miami Rockets
- 1959 - Miami Rockets
- 1960 - Altona Maroons
- 1961 - Pilot Mount Pilots
- 1962 - Miami Rockets
- 1963 - Miami Rockets
- 1964 - Carman Beavers
- 1965 - Miami Rockets
- 1966 - Pilot Mount Pilots
- 1967 - Carman Beavers
- 1968 - Carman Beavers
- 1969 - Oakville Seals
- 1970 - Oakville Seals
- 1971 - Winkler Royals
- 1972 - Winkler Royals
- 1973 - Oakville Seals
- 1974 - Oakville Seals
- 1975 - Altona Maroons
- 1976 - Morden Bombers
- 1977 - Carman Beavers
- 1978 - Pilot Mound Pilots
- 1979 - Morden Bombers
- 1980 - Altona Maroons
- 1981 - Carman Beavers
- 1982 - Morden Bombers
- 1983 - Carman Beavers
- 1984 - Portage Hawks
- 1985 - Altona Maroons
- 1986 - Portage Hawks
- 1987 - Portage Hawks
- 1988 - Altona Maroons
- 1989 - Winkler Royals
- 1990 - Warroad Lakers
- 1991 - Morden Redskins
- 1992 - Morden Redskins
- 1993 - Morden Redksins
- 1994 - Morden Redksins
- 1995 - Portage Hawks
- 1996 - Notre Dame Hawks
- 1997 - Morden Redskins
- 1998 - Swan Lake Cougars
- 1999 - Carman Beavers
- 2000 - Morden Redskins
- 2001 - Morden Redskins
- 2002 - Altona Maroons
- 2003 - Morden Redskins
- 2004 - Morden Redskins
- 2005 - Notre Dame Hawks
- 2006 - Carman Beavers
- 2007 - Stonewall Flyers
- 2008 - Morden Redskins
- 2009 - Plum Coulee Xpress
- 2010 - Warren Mercs
- 2011 - Plum Coulee Xpress
- 2012 - Altona Maroons
- 2013 - Altona Maroons
- 2014 - Morden Redskins
- 2015 - Morden Redskins
- 2016 - Carman Beavers
- 2017 - Notre Dame Hawks
- 2018 - Carman Beavers
- 2019 - Morden Redskins
- 2020 - Not awarded
- 2021 - Not awarded
- 2022 - Warren Mercs
- 2023 - Ste Anne Aces
- 2024 - Ste Anne Aces
- 2025 - Ste Anne Aces
- 2026 - Winkler Royals

== National championships ==
The US-based Warroad Lakers were the first SEMHL club to win the Canadian national championship Allan Cup, which they did in 1994, 1995 and 1996. The Île-des-Chênes North Stars became the second in 2003.
