= Frank Rankin =

Canadian ice hockey player and coach (1891–1932)

- Hockey Hall of Fame, 1961
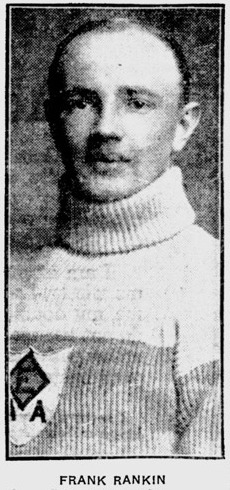
- Born: April 1, 1891 Stratford, Ontario, Canada
- Died: July 23, 1932 (aged 41) Stratford, Ontario, Canada
- Height: 5 ft 5 in (165 cm)
- Weight: 145 lb (66 kg; 10 st 5 lb)
- Position: Rover
- Shot: Right
- Played for: Toronto Eaton's; Toronto St. Michael's Majors
- Playing career: 1904–1915

Frank Gilchrist Rankin (April 1, 1891 – July 23, 1932) was a Canadian ice hockey player and coach. As a player, Rankin played the rover position for the Toronto Eaton's and Toronto St. Michael's Majors in senior hockey between 1910 and 1914. Rankin later coached the Toronto Granites to the gold medal for Canada at the 1924 Winter Olympics.

== Personal ==
Rankin was one of ten children born to Mr. and Mrs. Joseph Rankin of Stratford, Ontario. He had seven brothers: Charles, Jimmy, George, Gordon, Reginald, Sid and Fred, and two sisters, Annie and Nellie. Rankin was conscripted into the Canadian military on November 2, 1918 for the First World War, but an armistice was signed on November 11 so he did not actively serve. He died in 1932 in his hometown of Stratford from blood poisoning.

== Ice hockey career ==
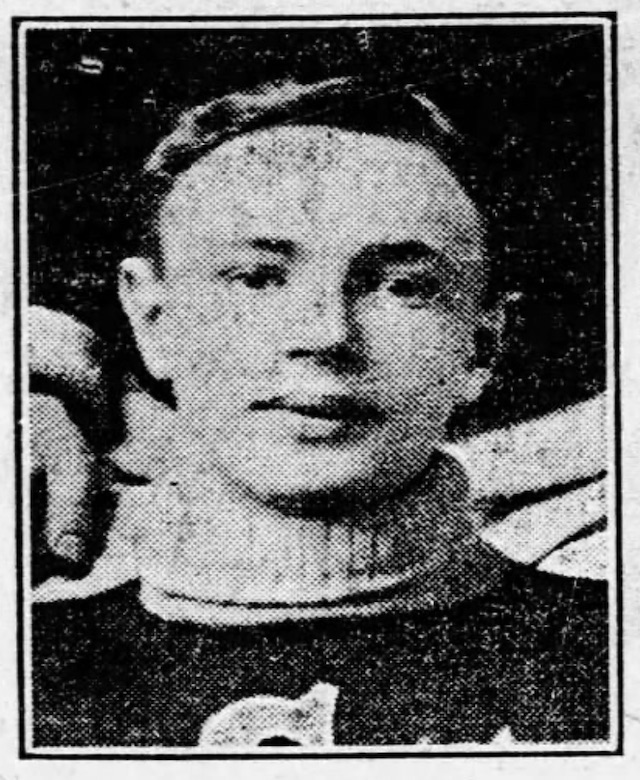
Rankin with the Stratford Hockey Club

Rankin played junior hockey in his hometown of Stratford with the Stratford team in the Ontario Hockey Association from 1904 until 1910. His brother Jimmy also played with the team. He then moved to Toronto and played senior hockey with the Toronto Eaton's. He played two seasons with the Eaton's, scoring 21 goals in ten games. He then joined the senior Toronto St. Michael's Majors where he played in three seasons. In 1912, Rankin scored an 20 goals in five games. In the 1914–15 season, while playing for St. Michael's, Rankin was seriously cut in the face and suffered blood poisoning, which required hospitalization. He retired from playing shortly after.

While an amateur player in the OHA Rankin was a highly sought after player from the professional ranks, and he was said to have been offered over $2,000 to finish the 1912–13 season with the Toronto Blueshirts of the National Hockey Association, but eventually stayed in the amateur ranks.

Rankin became coach of the Toronto Granites, leading them to the Allan Cup championship in 1922 and 1923. For winning the Cup in 1923, the Granites were selected to represent Canada at the 1924 Winter Olympics. The team won six consecutive games to take the gold medal.

Frank Rankin was inducted into the Hockey Hall of Fame as a player in 1961.

== Career statistics ==
=== Regular season and playoffs ===
			Regular season					Playoffs
Season	Team	League	GP	G	A	Pts	PIM	GP	G	A	Pts	PIM
1909–10	Stratford HC	Exhib	2	4	0	4	—	—	—	—	—	—
1910–11	Toronto Eaton's	OHA Sr	4	15	0	15	—	2	4	0	4	—
1911–12	Toronto Eaton's	OHA Sr	6	6	0	6	—	4	3	0	3	12
1912–13	Toronto St. Michael's	OHA Sr	5	22	0	22	—	4	4	0	4	—
1913–14	Toronto St. Michael's	OHA Sr	2	10	0	10	—	2	3	0	3	—
1914–15	Toronto St. Michael's	OHA Sr	4	10	0	10	—	1	1	0	1	2
OHA Sr totals			21	63	0	63	—	13	15	0	15	—

== Bibliography ==
- Hockey Hall of Fame (2003). Honoured Members: Hockey Hall of Fame. Bolton, Ontario: Fenn Publishing. ISBN 1-55168-239-7.
- MacLeod, Alan Livingstone (2018), From Rinks to Regiments: Hockey Hall-of-Famers and the Great War, Victoria, British Columbia: Heritage House, ISBN 978-1-77203-268-0
