= 1913 Allan Cup =

Canadian senior ice hockey championship

The Allan Cup trophy

The 1913 Allan Cup was the Canadian senior ice hockey championship for the 1912–13 season. The final challenge was hosted by the Winnipeg Hockey Club and played in Winnipeg, Manitoba. The 1913 playoff marked the sixth time the Allan Cup had a champion.

== Manitoba Hockey League ==
The defending 1912 Allan Cup champions, Winnipeg Victorias, failed to win the Manitoba Hockey League. With a 7-1-0 record, the Winnipeg Hockey Club were given the right to carry the Allan Cup. The decisive game was won by Winnipeg on February 13 by a score of 7–5.

== First challenge ==
The Winnipeg Hockey Club received a challenge from the Moose Jaw Moose, Saskatchewan champions. Played in Winnipeg, Manitoba.

- Winnipeg Hockey Club (Allan Cup holder)
- Moose Jaw Moose (Challenger)

=== Results ===
March 11 - Winnipeg Hockey Club 6 - Moose Jaw Moose 0

Winnipeg	6	Position	0	Moose Jaw
Gannon		Goal		Ellis
Turnbull	1	Point		Pascoe
Ruttan		Cover		Battell
Andrews		Rover		J. Law
Aldous	2	Center		Kent
McKenzie		Right Wing		Boucher
Adamson	3	Left Wing		McDonald

Source: Edmonton Journal

March 13 - Winnipeg Hockey Club 10 - Moose Jaw Moose 3

Winnipeg	10	Position	3	Moose Jaw
Gannon		Goal		Ellis
Turnbull		Point		Pascoe
Ruttan	2	Cover		Battell
Andrews	1	Rover		J. Law
Aldous	2	Center		Kent
McKenzie	2	Right Wing	2	Fishendon
Adamson	3	Left Wing	1	McDonald

Source: Edmonton Journal

Winnipeg Hockey Club carries the Allan Cup, winning the series 16-goals-to-3.

== Second challenge ==
Winnipeg Hockey Club received a challenge from the Edmonton Eskimos, the Alberta champions. Played in Winnipeg, Manitoba.

- Winnipeg Hockey Club (Allan Cup holder)
- Edmonton Eskimos (Challenger)

=== Results ===
March 15 - Winnipeg Hockey Club 9 - Edmonton Eskimos 6
March 17 - Winnipeg Hockey Club 9 - Edmonton Eskimos 2

Winnipeg Hockey Club carries the Allan Cup, winning the series 18-goals-to-8. With no more challengers accepted in time to play, Winnipeg wins the 1913 Allan Cup.
