= Truro Bearcats (senior) =

- City: Truro, Nova Scotia
- League: Nova Scotia Senior Hockey League
- Operated: 1985-1998
- Home arena: Colchester Legion Stadium
- Colours: Black, Yellow, and White
- General manager: Larry Anthony, Jim Foley
- Head coach: John Kibyuk

The Truro Bearcats were a Canadian Senior ice hockey team from Truro, Nova Scotia. The Bearcats were the 1998 Allan Cup Canadian National champions of Senior hockey.

== History ==
In 1998, the Truro Bearcats became only the second team from Nova Scotia to win the Allan Cup.

The Bearcats started off the 1997-98 season by announcing that the team would cease operation to help make way for the upstart Truro Bearcats Junior "A" team after twelve years of operation. For their final year, the Canadian Amateur Hockey Association awarded them the right to host the 1998 Allan Cup.

In the first game of the Allan Cup, the Bearcats beat the Powell River Regals 5-1. In their second game, they tied the Ile des Chenes North Stars 1-1. They closed out the round robin with a 5-3 win over the London Admirals. The victory allowed them to finish first in the round robin and advance directly to the Allan Cup final. In front of a hometown crowd, the Bearcats again faced London, beating them soundly 6-1 to win their only ever Allan Cup. This would be the last game ever played by the Bearcats.
