= Morden Bombers =

Ice hockey club in Manitoba, Canada

- City: Morden, Manitoba
- League: SEMHL
- Founded: 1986
- Home arena: Huron Arena
- Colours
- General manager: Bob Agnew
- Head coach: Lee Kowalski

Franchise history
- 1986–2020: Morden Redskins
- Since 2020: Morden Bombers

Championships
- League: 1991; 1992; 1993; 1994; 1997; 2000; 2001; 2003; 2004; 2008; 2014; 2015; 2019

The Morden Bombers are a senior ice hockey club and franchise of the South Eastern Manitoba Hockey League (SEMHL). The team plays its home games at the Huron Arena in Morden, Manitoba.

The Morden Redskins joined the SEMHL as an expansion franchise in 1986. From 1991 to 2019, the club won 13 league championships, more than any other club in SEMHL history.

In 2020, the club changed its name to the Morden Bombers.

Statistics
Season	GP	W	L	T	OTL	SOL	Pts	GF	GA	Regular season	Post-season
1986–87	25	12	12	1	0	0	25	150	150	5th place	
1987–88	25	8	17	0	0	0	16	131	154	5th place	
1988–89	25	17	7	1	0	0	35	168	107	2nd place	
2000–01	18	15	2	0	0	1	31	98	49	1st place	Won final
2001–02	18	9	7	0	0	1	19	75	75	2nd place	
2002–03	24	21	2	0	0	1	43	121	51	1st place	Won final
2003–04	24	17	6	0	0	1	35	89	53	1st place	Won final
2004–05	24	9	13	0	0	2	20	86	82	3rd place	
2005–06	24	14	9	0	1	0	29	105	108	3rd place	Lost final against Carman
2006–07	21	14	6	0	0	1	29	110	80	3rd place	Lost semifinal
2007–08	21	17	2	0	1	1	36	123	63	1st place	Won final
2008–09	21	13	4	0	2	2	30	112	64	2nd place	Lost final against Plum Coulee
2009–10	21	16	4	0	0	1	33	94	55	2nd place	Won quarterfinal against Stonewall (3:2); Lost semifinal against Altona (4:3)
2010–11	21	8	12	0	1	0	17	86	94	6th place	Lost quarterfinal against Altona (3:0)
2011–12	21	17	2	0	2	0	36	113	79	1st place	Won quarterfinal against Oakville (3:0); Lost semifinal against Altona (4:2)
2012–13	20	12	6	0	2	0	26	92	77	3rd place	Won preliminary against Plum Coulee (3:2); Lost semifinal against Warren (4:2)
2013–14	20	13	5	0	1	1	28	94	78	3rd place	Won preliminary against Notre Dame (3:0); Won semifinal against Winkler (4:2); Won final against Altona (4:0)
2014–15	20	14	6	0	0	0	28	82	56	1st place	Won semifinal against Altona (4:1); Won final against Carman (4:0)
2015–16	20	11	8	0	0	1	23	77	68	3rd place	Won quarterfinal against Notre Dame (3:0); Won semifinal against Altona (4:1); Lost final against Carman (4:2)
2016–17	21	9	11	0	1	0	19	69	96	5th place	Lost quarterfinal against Warren (3:1)
2017–18	20	11	9	0	0	0	22	78	69	3rd place	Lost quarterfinal against Altona (3:0)
2018–19	20	12	7	0	0	1	25	114	66	4th place	Won quarterfinal against Altona (3:2); Won seminfinal against Carman (4:2); Won final against Warren (4:3)
2019–20	18	5	11	0	1	1	12	38	65	6th place	Lost preliminary against Notre Dame (3:2)
2020–21	Season cancelled										
2021–22	18	13	5	0	0	0	26	78	67	2nd place	Lost semifinal against Warren (4:1)
2022–23	18	11	6	0	0	1	23	94	88	3rd place	Won quarterfinal against Île-des-Chênes (3:0); Won semifinal against Warren (3:1); Lost final against Ste Anne (4:3)
2023–24	18	8	7	0	1	2	19	75	72	5th place	Won quarterfinal against Portage (3:1); Lost semifinal against Warren (3:2)
2024–25	18	11	7	0	0	0	22	82	79	4th place	Lost quarterfinal against Notre Dame (3:2)
2025–26	18	8	9	0	1	0	17	104	95	5th place	Lost quarterfinal against Red River (3:2)

Source: "Standings". semhl.net. South Eastern Manitoba Hockey League.

== Sources ==
- "League history". semhl.net. South Eastern Manitoba Hockey League.
- "Morden Completes Title Defence In Double OT". PortageOnline. 18 March 2015.
- Beaudette, Teghan (27 October 2015). "City councillor to ask Morden Redskins to change 'derogatory' name". CBC News. CBC/Radio-Canada.
- "Morden Redskins reignite debate over offensive team names". CBC Radio. CBC/Radio-Canada. 30 October 2015.
- Froese, Ian (10 July 2020). "Mayor, community members urge Morden hockey team to ditch controversial nickname". CBC News. CBC/Radio-Canada.
- Malone, Kelly Geraldine (13 July 2020). "'The time has come:' Morden, Man., mayor calls on hockey team to change name". Global News. Corus News. The Canadian Press.
- Anthony, Dave (10 February 2026). "Bombers alumni celebration a smashing success". PembinaValleyOnline.
