= London Admirals =

- City: London, Ontario
- League: Southwestern Senior A Hockey League
- Operated: 1997-1999
- Home arena: London Ice Park previously known as Brookside Arena
- Colours: Black, Red, and White

Franchise history
- 1997-1998: London Admirals
- 1998-1999: London MacMaster Chevys

The London Admirals were a Canadian Senior ice hockey team from London, Ontario. The Admirals were one-time national Allan Cup finalists.

== History ==
The London Admirals were a short lived Senior hockey team in Southwestern Ontario. They have the distinction of playing in an era where Senior hockey's popularity was near dead in Ontario, but still managed to compete in two Allan Cup tournaments in only two seasons.

In 1997, the Southwestern Senior A Hockey League, the only sanctioned senior league left in Ontario, was down to five teams and wished to expand. One team brought in was the London Admirals. In their first season, the Admirals cleaned house with 24 wins, 2 losses, and a tie. The first-place finish and a great playoff run got them into the 1998 Allan Cup in Truro, Nova Scotia in only their first season. In the first game of the tournament, the Admirals took on Manitoba's Ile des Chenes North Stars but lost 6–4. In the second game, London defeated British Columbia's Powell River Regals 4–3. In the third round robin game, the Admirals were pitted against the hometown Truro Bearcats who beat London 5–3. Finishing third in the round robin, the Admirals earned the right to play the North Stars again in the semi-final. After being tied 4–4 at the end of regulation, the Admirals and North Stars played late into the night. In the third overtime, London scored to win 5-4 and earn a berth into the Allan Cup final, a little more than half a day away. In the final, the Bearcats asserted themselves on the Admirals in front of the crowd at the full Colchester Legion Stadium taking an early lead and never looking back, the Bearcats would win 6–1 in what would be their last ever game.

Throughout the 1997-98 campaign fan support was dismal for the Admirals who had to share the market with the popular London Knights of the Ontario Hockey League. To bolster the team for its second campaign, the Admirals took on a sponsorship deal from MacMaster Chevy in London. Despite finishing third in the league in 1998–99, London still had a record of 18-7-0-3. They won the right to compete in the national playdowns again and ended up in the 1999 Allan Cup in Stony Plain, Alberta. In the first game, the hometown Stony Plain Eagles flattened London 8–3. In the second game, the Powell River Kings avenged their 1998 loss with an 8-1 blowout over London. In the third game of the round robin, the London MacMaster Chevys lost 4-3 to Saskatchewan's Lloydminster Border Kings to close out the Allan Cup tournament without a win. This would be the last game London would ever play.

A combination of poor fan support and a lack of major sponsors led to the demise of the Admirals, who never suited up again.

== Season-by-season standings ==
Note: GP = Games played, W = Wins, L = Losses, T = Ties, OTL = Overtime losses, Pts = Points, GF = Goals for, GA = Goals against

Season	GP	W	L	T	OTL	GF	GA	P	Results
1997-98	27	24	2	1	0	204	104	49	1st SWSHL
1998-99	28	18	7	0	3	199	131	39	3rd SWSHL
