= Quinton Howden =

Canadian ice hockey player (born 1992)

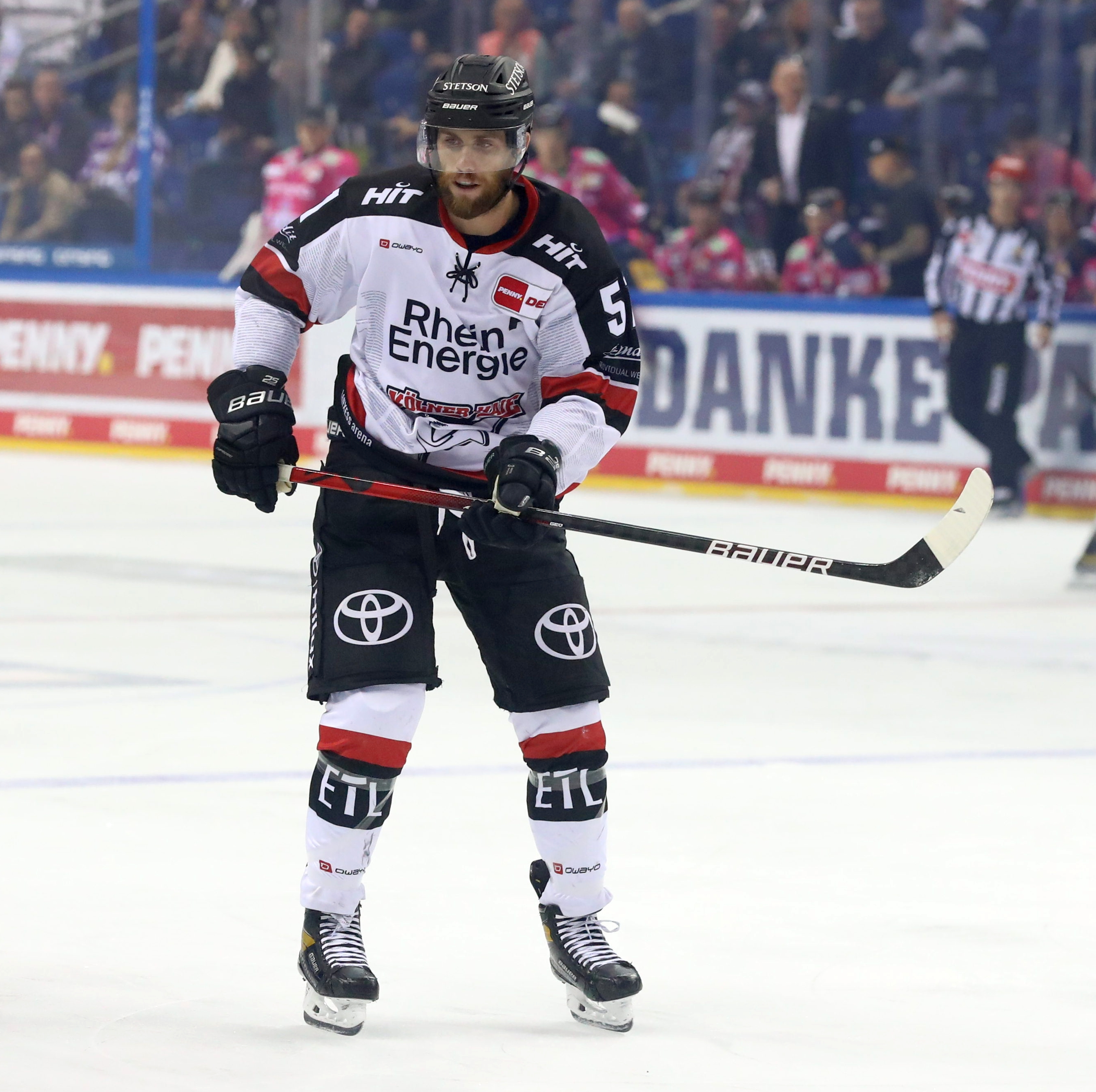
- Howden with Kölner Haie in 2021
- Born: January 21, 1992 (age 34) Oakbank, Manitoba, Canada
- Height: 6 ft 3 in (191 cm)
- Weight: 183 lb (83 kg; 13 st 1 lb)
- Position: Forward
- Shoots: Left
- SEMHL team Former teams: Springfield Winterhawks; Florida Panthers; Winnipeg Jets; Dinamo Minsk; Torpedo Nizhny Novgorod; Vityaz; Malmö Redhawks; Kölner Haie; Brûleurs de Loups; Mikkelin Jukurit
- National team: Canada
- NHL draft: 25th overall, 2010; Florida Panthers
- Playing career: 2012–present

Quinton Howden (born January 21, 1992) is a Canadian professional ice hockey player who is a forward for Springfield Winterhawks of the South Eastern Manitoba Hockey League (SEMHL). He was drafted by the Florida Panthers in the first round of the 2010 NHL entry draft, 25th overall. He was also selected to play in the 2011 and 2012 World Junior Ice Hockey Championships for Canada.

== Playing career ==
Howden started playing minor hockey when he was five. Before starting to play hockey, he broke his femur in a bicycle accident, and had to spend two months in a cast from chest to toe. As a result of the injury, his doctors doubted he would be a very good athlete.

Howden was the first overall choice in the 2007 Western Hockey League (WHL) Bantam Draft by the Moose Jaw Warriors. After weighing his options between National Collegiate Athletic Association (NCAA) hockey and the WHL, Howden chose to sign with the Warriors shortly after the draft. Howden played five games with the Warriors as an affiliate player during the 2007–08 season, before joining the club full-time for the 2008–09 season. He had a relatively quiet rookie season, but really came out in his sophomore season setting a point-per-game pace.

After a 65-point season with Moose Jaw, Howden was drafted in the first round, 25th overall, in the 2010 NHL entry draft by the Florida Panthers. In 2011, he signed a three-year, entry-level contract with Florida but was sent back to Moose Jaw for his final year of junior. In the 2012–13 season, he split time between Florida and their American Hockey League (AHL) affiliate; in 18 games with Florida, he had no points.

After four seasons within the Panthers' organization, Howden failed to receive a qualifying offer and therefore left as a free agent to sign a one-year, two-way contract with the Winnipeg Jets on July 1, 2016.

After spending the majority of the 2016–17 season with the Jets' AHL affiliate, the Manitoba Moose, Howden failed to receive a qualifying offer.

As a free agent, Howden signed with Dinamo Minsk of the Kontinental Hockey League (KHL) on August 18, 2017.

After two seasons in Belarus with Dinamo Minsk, Howden left as a free agent to sign a one-year contract to continue in the KHL with Russian outfit, Torpedo Nizhny Novgorod on August 6, 2019. In the 2019–20 season, Howden posted 7 goals and 13 points in 36 games before he was traded by Torpedo to Vityaz on December 23, 2019. In the second half of the season, Howden in a top 6 scoring role contributed with 4 goals and 7 points in 19 games. He made his KHL playoff debut with Vityaz, finishing as the club's leading goalscorer with 2 goals in a 4 games series sweep defeat to SKA Saint Petersburg.

== International play ==
Medal record

Men's ice hockey

Representing Canada

Winter Olympics
Bronze medal – third place	2018 Pyeongchang	

World Junior Championships
Silver medal – second place	2011 USA	
Bronze medal – third place	2012 Canada	

Ivan Hlinka Memorial Tournament
Gold medal – first place	2009 Slovakia	

Howden was invited to take part in Canada's 2011 National Junior Team selection camp He then participated at the 2011 World Junior Ice Hockey Championships in Buffalo, New York, winning the silver medal; and the 2012 World Junior Ice Hockey Championships in Canada, winning bronze. In 2018, Howden won a bronze medal after he was chosen to represent Canada at the 2018 Winter Olympics.

== Personal life ==
Howden's younger brother is 2023 Stanley Cup champion Brett was drafted 27th overall by the Tampa Bay Lightning in the 2016 NHL entry draft.

Howden married Cassandra Tremblay on August 10, 2017.

== Career statistics ==
=== Regular season and playoffs ===
			Regular season					Playoffs
Season	Team	League	GP	G	A	Pts	PIM	GP	G	A	Pts	PIM
2007–08	Moose Jaw Warriors	WHL	5	0	0	0	0	—	—	—	—	—
2008–09	Moose Jaw Warriors	WHL	62	13	17	30	22	—	—	—	—	—
2009–10	Moose Jaw Warriors	WHL	65	28	37	65	44	2	0	2	2	2
2010–11	Moose Jaw Warriors	WHL	60	40	39	79	43	6	5	2	7	2
2011–12	Moose Jaw Warriors	WHL	52	30	35	65	16	14	5	10	15	6
2011–12	San Antonio Rampage	AHL	—	—	—	—	—	4	0	0	0	2
2012–13	San Antonio Rampage	AHL	57	13	17	30	24	—	—	—	—	—
2012–13	Florida Panthers	NHL	18	0	0	0	2	—	—	—	—	—
2013–14	San Antonio Rampage	AHL	59	10	17	27	26	—	—	—	—	—
2013–14	Florida Panthers	NHL	16	4	2	6	10	—	—	—	—	—
2014–15	San Antonio Rampage	AHL	33	3	15	18	16	3	0	1	1	2
2015–16	Florida Panthers	NHL	58	6	5	11	18	—	—	—	—	—
2016–17	Manitoba Moose	AHL	58	13	11	24	10	—	—	—	—	—
2016–17	Winnipeg Jets	NHL	5	0	0	0	0	—	—	—	—	—
2017–18	Dinamo Minsk	KHL	56	17	15	32	34	—	—	—	—	—
2018–19	Dinamo Minsk	KHL	58	12	16	28	24	—	—	—	—	—
2019–20	Torpedo Nizhny Novgorod	KHL	36	7	6	13	39	—	—	—	—	—
2019–20	Vityaz	KHL	19	4	3	7	4	4	2	0	2	2
2020–21	Malmö Redhawks	SHL	11	0	3	3	12	—	—	—	—	—
2021–22	Kölner Haie	DEL	45	7	11	18	20	—	—	—	—	—
2022–23	Brûleurs de Loups	France	16	1	7	8	4	12	0	3	3	4
2022–23	Mikkelin Jukurit	Liiga	10	0	1	1	10	—	—	—	—	—
NHL totals			97	10	7	17	30	—	—	—	—	—
KHL totals			169	40	40	80	101	4	2	0	2	2

=== International ===
Year	Team	Event	Result	GP	G	A	Pts	PIM
2009	Canada Western	U17	4th	6	3	1	4	10
2009	Canada	IH18	1st place, gold medalist(s)	4	0	0	0	2
2010	Canada	WJC18	7th	6	4	2	6	4
2011	Canada	WJC	2nd place, silver medalist(s)	7	2	3	5	4
2012	Canada	WJC	3rd place, bronze medalist(s)	6	3	3	6	2
2018	Canada	OG	3rd place, bronze medalist(s)	3	0	1	1	0
Junior totals				29	12	9	21	22
Senior totals				3	0	1	1	0

Awards and achievements
Preceded by Nick Bjugstad	Florida Panthers first-round draft pick 2010	Succeeded by Jonathan Huberdeau
