= 1990 Allan Cup =

Canadian senior ice hockey championship

The Allan Cup trophy

The 1990 Allan Cup was the Canadian senior ice hockey championship for the 1989–90 senior "AAA" season. The event was hosted by the Montreal-Chomedy Construction in Vaudreuil, Quebec. The 1990 tournament marked the 82nd time that the Allan Cup has been awarded.

== Teams ==
- Abbotsford Flyers (Western Canadian Champions)
- Montreal-Chomedy Construction (Eastern Canadian Champions)

== Best-of-Seven Series ==
Abbotsford Flyers 5 - Montreal-Chomedy Construction 3
Montreal-Chomedy Construction 10 - Abbotsford Flyers 6
Montreal-Chomedy Construction 5 - Abbotsford Flyers 3
Abbotsford Flyers 7 - Montreal-Chomedy Construction 2
Montreal-Chomedy Construction 7 - Abbotsford Flyers 0
Montreal-Chomedy Construction 3 - Abbotsford Flyers 1
