= 1992 Allan Cup =

Canadian senior ice hockey championship

The Allan Cup trophy

The 1992 Allan Cup was the Canadian senior ice hockey championship for the 1991–92 senior "AAA" season. The event was hosted by the Saint John Vito's in Saint John, New Brunswick. The 1992 tournament marked the 84th time that the Allan Cup had been awarded.

== Teams ==
- Charlottetown Islanders (East)
- Saint John Vito's (Host)
- Stony Plain Eagles (Pacific)
- Warroad Lakers (West)

== Results ==
Round Robin

Warroad Lakers 5 - Charlottetown Islanders 4
Saint John Vito's 2 - Stony Plain Eagles 1
Charlottetown Islanders 5 - Stony Plain Eagles 1
Saint John Vito's 7 - Warroad Lakers 2
Stony Plain Eagles 10 - Warroad Lakers 9 (OT)
Saint John Vito's 5 - Charlottetown Islanders 3

Semi-final

Stony Plain Eagles 5 - Charlottetown Islanders 1

Final

Saint John Vito's 6 - Stony Plain Eagles 2

== Winning Roster ==
Scott MacKenzie - Defense Eric Bissonnette - Defense Phill Huckins - Defense Paul Hanson - Forward Mike Clark - Defense Mike Dwyer - Forward Ron Gaudet - Forward Wayne Moore - Forward Ron Hatfield - Forward Randy Thomas - Forward Mark Farwell - Defense Martin LeFebvre - Forward Charlie Bourgeois - Defense Patrick Cloutier - Defense Dan O'Brien - Forward Bob Kaine - Forward Blair MacPherson - Defense Tony Wormell - Forward Todd Stark - Forward Mike Boyce - Defense Bob Brown - Forward Sylvain Mayer - Forward Rick Poirier - Goalie Dan Leblond - Forward Dave Matte - Goalie Michel Boucher - Forward Coaches - Blair Nicholson, Brian Ford, Dave Wright. General Manager - Neil MacKenzie Owners - Nick and Peter Georgoudis Trainers - Bob Maloney and Fred Gorman
