= 1974 Allan Cup =

Canadian senior ice hockey championship

The Allan Cup trophy

The 1974 Allan Cup was the Canadian senior ice hockey championship for the 1973–74 senior "A" season. The event was hosted by the Cranbrook Royals and Cranbrook, British Columbia. The 1974 playoff marked the 66th time that the Allan Cup has been awarded.

== Teams ==
- Barrie Flyers (Eastern Canadian Champions)
- Cranbrook Royals (Western Canadian Champions)

== Best-of-Seven Series ==
Barrie Flyers 4 - Cranbrook Royals 1
Cranbrook Royals 4 - Barrie Flyers 2
Cranbrook Royals 9 - Barrie Flyers 5
Barrie Flyers 5 - Cranbrook Royals 4 (2OT)
Barrie Flyers 4 - Cranbrook Royals 3
Barrie Flyers 4 - Cranbrook Royals 1
