= Eddie Powers =

Canadian lacrosse and hockey player

Edward Powers
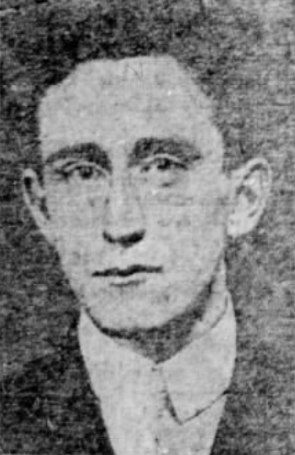
- Powers c. 1911
- Born: September 11, 1888; Elora, Ontario, Canada
- Died: January 17, 1943 (aged 54)
- Occupation: ice hockey coach

Edward Joseph Powers (September 11, 1888 – January 17, 1943) was a Canadian professional lacrosse player, professional ice hockey player and coach. Powers was head coach of the Toronto St. Pats of the National Hockey League (NHL) for two seasons and minor professional league coach for 13 seasons, including championship seasons with the Boston Tigers (CAHL) and Syracuse Stars. He was an assistant coach, scout and hockey executive for the Toronto franchise.

== Biography ==
Powers was born in Elora, Ontario on September 11, 1888. From the age of 16, Powers played senior lacrosse. He played with Victoria and Nelson in British Columbia. He returned east and started coaching lacrosse. He was coach of the 1926 Mann Cup championship team Weston Westonmen.

Powers' ice hockey coaching career began when he was employed as a youth with the Eaton's department store chain, coaching the store's own team. Powers moved on to coaching amateur teams. In 1919–20, he coached Toronto Parkdale's senior team. In 1920–21, he coached the Port Colborne intermediate team. He coached the Westminster Hockey Club in Boston in 1921-1922 and led them to the US Championship. He also coached the MIT Engineers hockey team during the 1921–22 season.

In fall 1922, the University of Pennsylvania recruited Powers to coach its hockey and lacrosse teams. He took the job and coached the teams for two years, through the 1923-1924 season. Financial troubles at the university led Penn to disband the team, but Powers was offered his first job as a professional ice hockey coach, joining the Toronto St. Patricks for the 1924-1925 season. In 1926, Powers moved to Boston to coach the new Boston Tigers (Canadian-American Hockey League (CAHL) team. He coached in Boston for six seasons, winning the CAHL championship in 1929. Powers coached the New Haven Eagles in 1932–33 before moving to the Syracuse Stars organization. He coached the Stars from 1934 until 1939, winning the IAHL championship in 1937. He then joined the Toronto Maple Leafs organization where he was the assistant coach in 1940–41 and during the 1942 Stanley Cup Finals.

He returned to head coaching in the 1942–1943 season for the New Haven Eagles.

Powers' death coincided with the suspension of the Eagles by the AHL. Powers' health was poor but he travelled to a road game with the club on January 16 in Washington. On January 17, 1943 the day of the final game for the Eagles, Powers went out to buy a newspaper, and collapsed of a cerebral hemorrhage in New Haven, Connecticut. He died an hour later. The final game went ahead as scheduled and the Eagles won the game 9–4 over the Providence Reds after a minute of silence for Powers. As scheduled, the team was disbanded by the American Hockey League the next day. At the time of his death, Powers had been considering a coaching job in the Quebec Senior Hockey League offered by T. P. Gorman, who knew him from his youth, playing against him in lacrosse. Coaches Hap Day of the Maple Leafs and Dick Irvin of the Montreal Canadiens both praised Powers as a "fine fellow", "a real gentleman" and "a great hockey player."

== Legacy ==
The trophy for the scoring championship of the Ontario Hockey League is named the Eddie Powers Memorial Trophy.

== Personal ==
Powers was born in Elora, Ontario and moved to Toronto as a youth. Powers married Pearl Dennahower and was the father of one daughter (Audrie) and five sons, ( Rowan, James, Edward, Novey and Patrick), whom were in the RCAF at the time of his death. Powers was interred at Mount Hope Cemetery in Toronto. Powers was also a scout for the Toronto Maple Leafs and head of their farm system during his career.

== Coaching record ==
=== NHL ===
Team	Year	Regular season							Postseason
Team	Year	G	W	L	T	OTL	Pts	Finish	Result
Toronto St. Patricks	1924–25	30	19	11	0	—	38	2nd in NHL	Lost in NHL Championship (2-5 vs. MTL)
Toronto St. Patricks	1925–26	36	12	21	3	—	27	6th in NHL	Did not qualify
NHL Total		66	31	32	3	—	65		

=== Other leagues ===
Team	Year	Regular season							Postseason
Team	Year	G	W	L	T	OTL	Pts	Finish	Result
Boston Tigers	1926–27	32	14	15	3	-	31		Did not qualify
Boston Tigers	1927–28	40	21	14	5	-	46		Lost in first round
Boston Tigers	1928–29	40	21	11	8	-	50		Won championship
Boston Tigers	1929–30	40	17	18	5	-	39		Lost in Final
Boston Tigers/Cubs	1930–31	40	14	22	4	-	32		Did not qualify
Boston Cubs	1931–32	40	21	16	3	-	45		Lost in Final
New Haven Eagles	1932–33	48	16	27	5	-	37		Did not qualify
Syracuse Stars	1934–35	44	20	20	4	-	44		Did not qualify
Syracuse Stars	1935–36	48	26	19	3	-	55		Lost in playoffs
Syracuse Stars	1936–37	48	27	16	5	-	59		Won championship
Syracuse Stars	1937–38	48	21	20	7	-	49		Lost in Final
Syracuse Stars	1938–39	54	26	19	9	-	61		Lost in first round
New Haven Eagles	1942–43	32	9	18	5	-	23		Team folded

=== College head coaching record ===
Statistics overview
Season	Team	Overall	Conference	Standing	Postseason
MIT Engineers Independent (1921–1922)
1921–22	MIT	4–6–0			
MIT:		4–6–0			
Pennsylvania Quakers Independent (1922–1924)
1922–23	Pennsylvania	1–5–1			
1923–24	Pennsylvania	1–5–2			
Pennsylvania:		2–10–3			
Total:		6–16–3			
National champion Postseason invitational champion Conference regular season champion Conference regular season and conference tournament champion Division regular season champion Division regular season and conference tournament champion Conference tournament champion

Sporting positions
Preceded by Charles Querrie	Head coach of the Toronto St. Patricks; 1924-26	Succeeded by Charles Querrie
