= Colchester Legion Stadium =

Multi-purpose arena in Truro, Nova Scotia

Coordinates: 45.3697°N 63.2799°W

- Interactive map of Colchester Legion Stadium
- Location: 14 Lorne Street; Truro, Nova Scotia, Canada
- Capacity: Hockey: 1625

Construction
- Opened: 1965

Tenant
- Truro Bearcats (1997-2013)

The Colchester Legion Stadium is a 1625-seat multi-purpose arena in Truro, Nova Scotia, Canada.

The Colchester Legion Stadium has six team dressing rooms, an officials room and first aid room. Canteens and washrooms are located at the front of the facility. Upstairs is a fully heated lounge which overlooks the ice surface or main venue area of the stadium.

The facility served as home to the Truro Bearcats of the Maritime Junior Hockey League (MHL) from 1996 until 2013 until the team moved to the new Rath Eastlink Community Centre. The arena has hosted the 1998 Allan Cup as it was won by the Truro Bearcats senior team, 2001 World Under 17 Hockey Championships (co-hosted with New Glasgow) and the 2002 Fred Page Cup.

Colchester Legion Stadium is also home to local High School Hockey, Minor Hockey, Lacrosse during the summer and a local figure skating club. Events such as expos, model railway shows, a circus and flea markets are held often during summer months.

The arena hosted the Hockeyville NHL exhibition game between the Montreal Canadiens and Ottawa Senators on September 25, 2006. The Canadiens won the game 7-3. The nearby community of Salmon River won the CBC competition during the spring of 2006.

== Facilities ==
- Seating Capacity of 1625
- Upstairs Lounge Overlooking Ice Surface
- Six Team Dressing Rooms
- Officials Room
- Medical Room
- Skate Shop/Pro Shop
- Canteen

== Renovations and development ==
The Town of Truro and Municipality of Colchester County had agreed to co-operate in constructing a replacement stadium should the region win the right to be Nova Scotia's host community for the 2011 Canada Winter Games however the agreement was cancelled after Halifax won the right to be the host community.

In 2008 Mayors from the county of Colchester and the Town of Truro signed a memorandum of understanding regarding stadium renovations and the construction of a new civic centre for the region. The project was expected to cost $33 million. $2.4 million was to be contributed from that total to stadium renovations. By February 2009 the Town of Truro informed customers of the stadium that renovations would begin in the summer months, but renovations to the stadium had not yet been approved.

The Truro Bearcats played their first regular season game in the newly renovated stadium on September 12, 2009. The Bearcats paid tribute to the stadium and the renovation with presentations prior to the game, and went on to win the game 4-0.

Federal funding for renovations to the Colchester Legion Stadium were invested in December 2009. Phase one of two in the renovation project had already been completed through the Summer. $855,000 was contributed. The Atlantic Canada Opportunity Agency (ACOA)'s Recreational Infrastructure Canada program under Canada's Economic Action Plan provided the funding. Renovations were then estimated to cost $2.65 million.

As a result of renovations seating capacity was lowered from 2,200 seats to approximately 1600.
