= 1976 Allan Cup =

Canadian senior ice hockey championship

The Allan Cup trophy

The 1976 Allan Cup was the Canadian senior ice hockey championship for the 1975–76 senior "A" season. The event was hosted by the Spokane Flyers in Spokane, Washington. The 1976 playoff marked the 68th time that the Allan Cup has been awarded.

== Teams ==
This was a rematch of the 1972 Allan Cup series, won by Spokane.

- Barrie Flyers (Eastern Canadian Champions)
- Spokane Flyers (Western Canadian Champions)

== Best-of-Seven Series ==
Spokane Flyers 9 - Barrie Flyers 4
Spokane Flyers 4 - Barrie Flyers 1
Spokane Flyers 7 - Barrie Flyers 4
Spokane Flyers 8 - Barrie Flyers 2
