= Centre Sportif Lacroix-Dutil =

Sports arena in Quebec, Canada

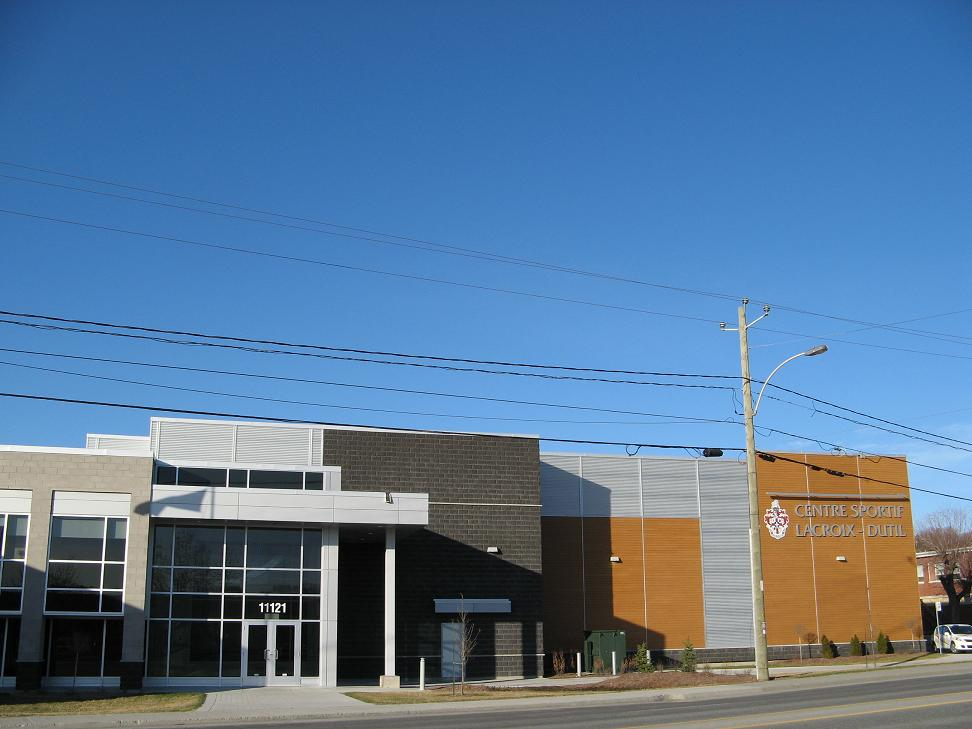

- Location within Quebec Location within Canada
- Location: 11121, 1e avenue Saint-Georges, Quebec; G5Y 2B9
- Coordinates: 46.12372°N 70.68089°W
- Capacity: 2,476

Construction
- Built: 1968
- Opened: 1968
- Renovated: 1998

Tenant
- Saint-Georges Cool FM 103.5 (since 1998) Beauce Jaros (1975-1976)

The Centre Sportif Lacroix-Dutil is a multi-purpose arena in Saint-Georges, Quebec, Canada. It has a capacity of 2,476.

== History ==
In 2011, plans were revealed for an expansion of the facility. It involved an extension constructed on an adjacent car park.
