= 1977 Allan Cup =

Canadian senior ice hockey championship

The Allan Cup trophy

The 1977 Allan Cup was the Canadian senior ice hockey championship for the 1976–77 senior "A" season. The event was hosted by the Brantford Alexanders in Brantford, Ontario. The 1977 playoff marked the 69th time that the Allan Cup has been awarded.

== Teams ==
- Brantford Alexanders (Eastern Canadian Champions)
- Spokane Flyers (Western Canadian Champions)

== Best-of-seven series ==
Brantford Alexanders 7 - Spokane Flyers 3
Spokane Flyers 5 - Brantford Alexanders 2
Brantford Alexanders 8 - Spokane Flyers 5
Brantford Alexanders 4 - Spokane Flyers 1
Brantford Alexanders 6 - Spokane Flyers 5 (OT)
