= Gordon Meeking =

Canadian ice hockey player (1890–1965)

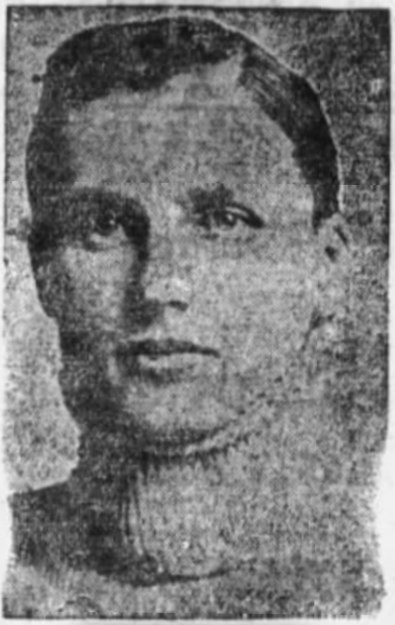
- Born: August 26, 1890 Barrie, Ontario, Canada
- Died: December 21, 1965 (aged 75)
- Height: 5 ft 6 in (168 cm)
- Weight: 130 lb (59 kg; 9 st 4 lb)
- Position: Centre
- Played for: Ottawa Senators; Toronto 228th Battalion; Victoria Aristocrats; Regina Capitals
- Playing career: 1907–1922

Gordon Sydney "Gord" Meeking (August 26, 1890 – December 21, 1965) was a Canadian professional ice hockey player for the Ottawa Senators, Toronto 228th Battalion, Victoria Aristocrats and Regina Capitals.

His brother Harry Meeking was also a hockey player.

== Playing career ==
Born in Barrie, Ontario, Meeking played junior hockey for the local Barrie Colts from 1907 until 1910. He then moved to Toronto and played for Toronto Eaton's and Toronto R & AA in the Ontario Hockey Association seniors until 1915. In 1915–16, he became a professional player with the Ottawa Senators. He enlisted in the Canadian army for World War I.

Before going to Europe to fight, he played for the Toronto 228th, a team of enlisted professional ice hockey players. After the war, he returned, and first played for Glace Bay Miners of the Cape Breton league. He moved out west and played for the Victoria Aristocrats in 1920–21 and the Regina Capitals in 1921–22 before retiring.

== See also ==
- National Hockey Association
- Pacific Coast Hockey Association
