= 2001 Allan Cup =

Canadian senior ice hockey championship

The Allan Cup trophy

The 2001 Allan Cup was the Canadian senior ice hockey championship for the 2000–01 senior "AAA" season. The event was hosted by the Petrolia Squires in Sarnia, Ontario. The 2001 tournament marked the 93rd year that the Allan Cup has been awarded.

== Teams ==
- Dundas Real McCoys (East)
- Lloydminster Border Kings (West)
- Petrolia Squires (Host)
- Stony Plain Eagles (Pacific)

== Results ==
Round Robin

Lloydminster Border Kings 5 - Dundas Real McCoys 3
Petrolia Squires 3 - Stony Plain Eagles 1
Lloydminster Border Kings 10 - Stony Plain Eagles 3
Dundas Real McCoys 8 - Petrolia Squires 0
Stony Plain Eagles 4 - Dundas Real McCoys 1
Petrolia Squires 2 - Lloydminster Border Kings 2

Semi-final

Petrolia Squires 3 - Stony Plain Eagles 0

Final

Lloydminster Border Kings 7 - Petrolia Squires 2
