= 1912 Allan Cup =

Canadian senior ice hockey championship

The Allan Cup trophy

The 1912 Allan Cup was the Canadian senior ice hockey championship for the 1911–12 season. The final challenge was hosted by the Winnipeg Victorias and Winnipeg, Manitoba. The 1912 playoff marked the 5th time the Allan Cup had a champion.

Claude C. Robinson was named a trustee for the Allan Cup in Western Canada to oversee challenges for the trophy. The Ottawa New Edinburghs announced that the Ontario Hockey Association (OHA) agreed to return the Allan Cup to its trustees, and that the New Edinburghs would travel to Winnipeg to challenge for the cup. Robinson was surprised by the announcement, and had expected to arrange exhibition games between the Winnipeg Victorias and the New Edinburghs. No challenge from the New Edinburghs was approved for 1912, since the Ottawa district playoffs took too long to complete ruling out to travel to Winnipeg.

The Victorias won the 1911–12 Manitoba Hockey League regular season, then defended the Allan Cup in three challenges. The Victorias defeated the Calgary Athletic Club by 11–0 and 8–6 scores in a two-game series, defeated Toronto Eaton's by 8–4 and 16–1 scores in a two-game series, and the Regina Capitals by a 9–3 score in a one-game challenge. In 1942, Robinson described the victory versus Toronto Eaton's as redemption for winning the trophy by default from the OHA.

== First challenge ==
The Winnipeg Victorias received a challenge from the Calgary Athletic Club, Alberta champions. Played in Winnipeg, Manitoba.

- Winnipeg Victorias (Allan Cup holder)
- Calgary Athletic Club (Challenger)

=== Results ===
Winnipeg Victorias 11 - Calgary Athletic Club 0
Winnipeg Victorias 8 - Calgary Athletic Club 6

Winnipeg Victorias carries the Allan Cup, winning the series 19-goals-to-6.

== Second challenge ==
The Winnipeg Victorias received a challenge from the Toronto Eaton's, Ontario champions. Played in Winnipeg, Manitoba.

- Winnipeg Victorias (Allan Cup holder)
- Toronto Eaton's (Challenger)

=== Results ===
Winnipeg Victorias 8 - Toronto Eatons 4
Winnipeg Victorias 16 - Toronto Eatons 1

Winnipeg Victorias carries the Allan Cup, winning the series 24-goals-to-5.

== Third challenge ==
The Winnipeg Victorias received a challenge from the Regina Capitals, Saskatchewan champions. Played in Winnipeg, Manitoba.

- Winnipeg Victorias (Allan Cup holder)
- Regina Capitals (Challenger)

=== Results ===
Winnipeg Victorias 9 - Regina Capitals 3

Winnipeg Victorias carries the Allan Cup. With no more challengers accepted in time to play, the Victorias win the 1912 Allan Cup.
