= Spokane Flyers (1974–1980) =

- City: Spokane, Washington
- League: Western International Hockey League, Pacific Hockey League
- Operated: 1974–80
- Home arena: Spokane Coliseum
- Colours: Blue and white

Franchise history
- 1963–1974: Spokane Jets
- 1974–1980: Spokane Flyers

Championships
- Playoff championships: 1975, 1976, 1977

The Spokane Flyers were a senior ice hockey team based in Spokane, Washington. They played in the Western International Hockey League (WIHL) from 1974–75 to the 1979–80 except for a one-year hiatus when they played in the Pacific Hockey League.

== History ==
The Second WIHL franchise in Spokane, the Flyers were originally named Spokane Jets and played from 1963 to 1974. After winning five league championships and two Allan Cups, the franchise was renamed as the Flyers, the same name as the earlier Spokane franchise. The rechristened team promptly won three more WIHL titles and a third Allan Cup (1976), making them top senior club in North America. In 1978, the Flyers made the jump to professional hockey and joined the Pacific Hockey League, a minor circuit that was supported by the World Hockey Association. Unfortunately, the Flyers joined at the same time that the WHA was preparing to be absorbed by the NHL. Despite the relative success of the PHL, the NHL had no interest in acquiring the league as it already used three different minor leagues for player development (AHL, CHL and IHL).

When the PHL dissolved in 1979, the Flyers returned to the WIHL and won another league championship and Allan Cup. Just like the previous franchise, this Flyers team was then pushed out of the market by the Western Hockey League when the Great Falls Americans relocated to Spokane. Coincidentally, the new team was also named the Spokane Flyers.
