= Hockey Northwestern Ontario =

Ice hockey governing body in Northwestern Ontario

- Sport: Ice hockey
- Jurisdiction: Northwestern Ontario
- Founded: 1915
- Headquarters: Thunder Bay

Official website
- www.hockeyhno.com

Hockey Northwestern Ontario (HNO) is the governing body of all ice hockey in Northwestern Ontario, Canada. Hockey Northwestern Ontario is a branch of Hockey Canada.

== Jurisdiction ==
Former emblem

Empowered by Hockey Canada, Hockey Northwestern Ontario has control of all senior, junior and minor hockey in the section of Northwestern Ontario west of the 85th meridian.

== Leagues ==
- Superior International Junior Hockey League Junior "A"
- Thunder Bay Junior B Hockey League Junior "B"
- HNO Senior "AAA" Loop (Fort Frances Thunderhawks, Kenora Thistles, Thunder Bay K&A Twins)

== History ==
Originally named Thunder Bay Amateur Hockey Association (TBAHA), the organization's name was changed to Hockey Northwestern Ontario (HNO) in 1999 to better reflect the geographical area it served. The association is responsible for controlling all hockey not controlled by the OHF or the HEO in Ontario. TBAHA supported a variety of Junior and Senior leagues, including: the Thunder Bay Junior A Hockey League, Thunder Bay Senior Hockey League, North Shore Intermediate Hockey League, Northwestern Ontario Junior Hockey League, and the Thunder Bay Junior B Hockey League, amongst others.

Famous teams from the TBAHA included: Fort William Beavers, Port Arthur Bearcats, Thunder Bay Twins, Fort Frances Royals, Kenora Intermediate Thistles, Kenora Junior Thistles, Kenora Muskies, Fort William Canadians, Westfort Hurricanes, Port Arthur Marrs, Thunder Bay Bombers and Thunder Bay Flyers.

The senior league disbanded over the period of 2011–2016. The Kenora Thistles suspended operations in January 2016. The senior league champion played the southern Ontario Allan Cup Hockey league for the Renwick Cup.

== Notable people ==
- Fred Page (1915–1997), TBAHA president from 1959 to 1964, and Hockey Hall of Fame inductee
- Bill Salonen (1935–2025), HNO president from 1979 to 1983
- Frank Sargent (1902–1988), TBAHA president from 1936 to 1938 and 1951 to 1953, and Canadian Curling Hall of Fame inductee
- H. J. Sterling (1882–1959), TBAHA president from 1919 to 1920

== See also ==
- List of ice hockey teams in Ontario
