= 2004 Allan Cup =

Canadian senior ice hockey championship

The Allan Cup trophy

The 2004 Allan Cup was the Canadian senior ice hockey championship for the 2003–04 senior "AAA" season. The event was hosted by the St-Georges Garaga in Saint-Georges, Quebec. The 2004 tournament marked the 96th year that the Allan Cup has been awarded.

== Teams ==
- Aylmer Blues (Ontario)
- Bentley Generals (Pacific)
- Laval Chiefs (Quebec)
- Ministikwan Islanders (West)
- St-Georges Garaga (Host)
- Saint John Thundercats (Atlantic)

== Results ==
Round Robin

Aylmer Blues 6 – Laval Chiefs 3
St-Georges Garaga 9 – Saint John Thundercats 3
Saint John Thundercats 2 – Bentley Generals 1
Laval Chiefs 2 – Ministikwan Islanders 1
Ministikwan Islanders 5 – Aylmer Blues 2
St-Georges Garaga 9 – Bentley Generals 3

Quarter-final

Laval Chiefs 5 – Saint John Thundercats 3
Bentley Generals 5 – Aylmer Blues 2

Semi-final

Ministikwan Islanders 7 – Laval Chiefs 1
St-Georges Garaga 7 – Bentley Generals 4

Final

St-Georges Garaga 5 – Ministikwan Islanders 0
