= 1998 Allan Cup =

Canadian senior ice hockey championship

The Allan Cup trophy

The 1998 Allan Cup was the Canadian senior ice hockey championship for the 1997–98 senior "AAA" season. The event was hosted by the Truro Bearcats in Truro, Nova Scotia. The 1998 tournament marked the 90th time that the Allan Cup has been awarded.

== Teams ==
- Ile des Chenes North Stars (West)
- London Admirals (East)
- Powell River Regals (Pacific)
- Truro Bearcats (Host)

== Results ==
Round Robin

Ile des Chenes North Stars 6 - London Admirals 4
Truro Bearcats 5 - Powell River Regals 1
London Admirals 4 - Powell River Regals 3
Truro Bearcats 1 - Ile des Chenes North Stars 1
Powell River Regals 6 - Ile des Chenes North Stars 3
Truro Bearcats 5 - London Admirals 3

Semi-final

London Admirals 5 - Ile des Chenes North Stars 4 (3OT)

Final

Truro Bearcats 6 - London Admirals 1
