= Toronto Eaton's =

- City: Toronto, Ontario; CAN
- League: Ontario Hockey Association
- Operated: c. 1909–1912
- Home arena: Excelsior Rink
- Colors: Blue and White
- Owner(s): Eaton's
- Head coach: Eddie Powers
- Captain: Frank Rankin

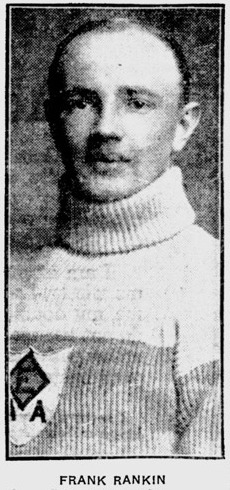
Frank Rankin with the Toronto Eaton's.

The Toronto Eaton's (or Eatons), of the Eaton Athletic Association, were an amateur ice hockey team from Toronto, Ontario, playing in the Ontario Hockey Association (OHA). The team got its name from the Canadian department store chain founded by Timothy Eaton that was once the largest in the country.

The Toronto Eaton's had its short-lived heyday in the early 1910s, when it was spearheaded by future Hockey Hall of Fame inductee Frank Rankin and won back-to-back OHA championships in 1910–11 and 1911–12. The team also challenged for the 1912 Allan Cup, as amateur champions of Canada, but lost to the Winnipeg Victorias.

== Notable players and personnel ==
- Frank Rankin
- Frank Foyston
- Gordon Meeking
- Eddie Powers, NHL coach with the Toronto St. Patricks
