= Saint-Georges Cool FM 103.5 =

Professional hockey team in Saint-Georges, Quebec, Canada

- City: Saint-Georges, Quebec
- League: Ligue Nord-Américaine de Hockey
- Founded: 1996
- Home arena: Centre Sportif Lacroix-Dutil
- Colours: Navy Blue, Silver and Gold

Franchise history
- 1996–1998: Rive-Sud Jackals
- 1998–2005: Saint-Georges Garaga
- 2005–2010: Saint-Georges CRS Express
- 2010–present: Saint-Georges Cool FM 103.5

Championships
- Playoff championships: 2 (2009–10, 2022–23)

Cool FM 103.5 de Saint-Georges de Beauce or the Saint-Georges de Beauce Cool FM 103.5 are a professional ice hockey team based in Saint-Georges, Quebec, Canada. The team is part of the Ligue Nord-Américaine de Hockey (LNAH), and plays at the Centre Sportif Lacroix-Dutil.

== History ==
The team was founded in 1996-97 as the Rive-Sud Jackals in the former Quebec Semi-Pro Hockey League (QSPHL). The Jackals became the Saint-Georges Garaga in 1998–99, when relocating to Saint-Georges, Quebec. The Garaga dominated Canadian senior hockey in the early 2000s, winning the 2002 Allan Cup and the 2004 Allan Cup. In 2005, the team was purchased by businessman Jean-Paul Blais, who also owns the CRS Express trucking company, and renamed the team Saint-Georges CRS Express. Blais sold the team to investors in 2010, and the team was renamed after a local radio station, CKRB-FM.

The last previous professional hockey team in the region were the Beauce Jaros from 1975 to 1977.

=== 2010 Futura Cup ===
Garaga made the 2010 as a #4 seed and defeated the Saguenay Marquis four games to two. Garaga scored 38 goals during the series. Three of the four victories against Saguenay were games that Garaga scored 8 or more goals.

St. Georges would advance to the Futura Cup Finals against the Sherbrooke St. François, who were the regular season champions. Garaga would go to defeat the Sherbrooke team four games to two

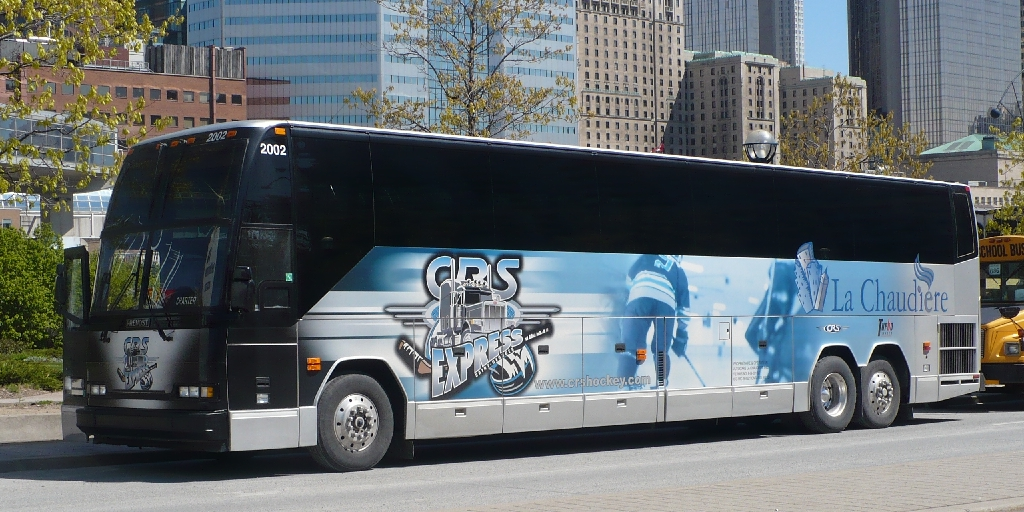
The team bus, operated by Autocar La Chaudière

== Awards ==
- Jesse Bélanger, 2010 LNAH Most Sportsman-like Player; 2010 LNAH 1st team All-Star (Center)
- Yvan Busque, 2010 LNAH Playoff MVP
- Dany Roussin, 2010 LNAH Offensive Rookie Of The Year

== Notable players ==
- Jonathan Delisle, former Montreal Canadiens draft pick who played for St. Georges CRS Express. Delisle died as a result of an automobile accident in March 2006. The Delisle Trophy has been named in his honour and is awarded to the LNAH player who "best exemplifies leadership in the regular season."
