= 2003 Allan Cup =

Canadian senior ice hockey championship

The Allan Cup trophy

The 2003 Allan Cup was the Canadian senior ice hockey championship for the 2002–03 senior "AAA" season. The event was hosted by the Dundas Real McCoys in Dundas, Ontario. The 2003 tournament marked the 95th year that the Allan Cup has been awarded.

== Teams ==
- Dundas Real McCoys (Host)
- Ile des Chenes North Stars (West)
- Lancaster Thundercats (East)
- Stony Plain Eagles (Pacific)

== Results ==
Round Robin

Ile des Chenes North Stars 6 - Lancaster Thundercats 3
Stony Plain Eagles 4 - Dundas Real McCoys 2
Lancaster Thundercats 6 - Stony Plain Eagles 4
Dundas Real McCoys 5 - Ile des Chenes North Stars 3
Ile des Chenes North Stars 6 - Stony Plain Eagles 2
Lancaster Thundercats 6 - Dundas Real McCoys 5 (OT)

Semi-final

Stony Plain Eagles 3 - Lancaster Thundercats 0

Final

Ile des Chenes North Stars 3 - Stony Plain Eagles 2 (2OT)
