= 2005 Allan Cup =

Canadian senior ice hockey championship

The Allan Cup trophy

The 2005 Allan Cup was the Canadian senior ice hockey championship for the 2004–05 senior "AAA" season. The event was hosted by the Lloydminster Border Kings in Lloydminster, Saskatchewan/Alberta. The 2005 tournament marked the 97th year that the Allan Cup has been awarded.

This Allan Cup coincided with the 2004-05 NHL lockout which had wiped out the entire 2004-05 NHL season including the Stanley Cup Playoffs. As a result, the tournament enjoyed considerably more media coverage compared to what is typically devoted to the Allan Cup. Among the participants involved was Theoren Fleury, a former National Hockey League all-star, playing for the Horse Lake Thunder during the lockout.

== Teams ==
- Can-Am Cobras (Atlantic)
- Horse Lake Thunder (Pacific)
- Lloydminster Border Kings (Host)
- Mid-West Islanders (West)
- Montmagny Sentinelles (Quebec)
- Thunder Bay Bombers (Ontario)

== Results ==
Round Robin

Mid-West Islanders 8 - Thunder Bay Bombers 3
Lloydminster Border Kings 7 - Can-Am Cobras 0
Montmagny Sentinelles 5 - Thunder Bay Bombers 2
Horse Lake Thunder 9 - Lloydminster Border Kings 2
Horse Lake Thunder 7 - Can-Am Cobras 2
Montmagny Sentinelles 6 - Mid-West Islanders 2

Quarter-final

Mid-West Islanders 4 - Can-Am Cobras 3
Thunder Bay Bombers 5 - Lloydminster Border Kings 0

Semi-final

Thunder Bay Bombers 7 - Horse Lake Thunder 5
Montmagny Sentinelles 4 - Mid-West Islanders 1

Final

Thunder Bay Bombers 4 - Montmagny Sentinelles 3
