= Thunder Bay Bombers =

- City: Thunder Bay, Ontario
- League: Independent
- Operated: 2003-2006
- Home arena: Fort William Gardens
- Colours: Green, Black, and White
- General manager: Albert Drake (2004-05); Dean Filane (2005-06)
- Head coach: Vern Ray (2004-05); Vern Ray (2005-06)

Franchise history
- 2003-2004: Thunder Bay Twins
- 2004-2006: Thunder Bay Bombers

The Thunder Bay Bombers were a Canadian Senior ice hockey team from Thunder Bay, Ontario. They played an independent schedule under the supervision of Hockey Northwestern Ontario. They were 2005 Allan Cup Canadian National Champions.

== History ==
The Twins were founded in 2003. A year later, under different management, they changed their name to the Bombers. The name Bombers was inspired by the hockey movie Youngblood and colours by that then worn by the San Jose Sharks.

In 2005, after shocking Major League Hockey's Aylmer Blues 2-games-to-none to win the Ontario seed and Renwick Cup, the Bombers went out to Lloydminster and captured the 2005 Allan Cup. This marked the first Allan Cup championship by an Ontario team since 1989 by the original Thunder Bay Twins.

The Bombers spent much of the 2005–06 season touring Europe as representatives of Hockey Canada, only to get quickly ejected from the playoffs by the Eastern Ontario Senior Hockey League's Whitby Dunlops. In Europe, they competed in a tournament for the Pannon GSM Cup in Budapest, Hungary. After tying the Croatia National Team 1-1, they lost 6–1 to the Slovenia National Team and 6–4 to the Hungary National Team. The team went home with an 0-2-1 record and the tournament's bronze medal. Losing a lot of money from the European trip, the teams suspended operations for the 2006–07 season, opening the door for a new regional team to take their playoff spot, the Kenora Thistles.

== 2005 Allan Cup run ==
=== Winning roster ===
Goalies:

- Cory McEachran
- Scott Sutton

Defence:

- Barry McKinlay
- Mike Jacobsen
- Matt Kenny
- Jeff Ricciardi
- Tyler Williamson
- Albert Drake
- Ed Atwill

Head Coach - Vern Ray

Assistant Coach - Dave Joubert

General Manager - Albert Drake

Equipment Manager - Rob Monty

Forwards:

- Mike Figliomeni
- Jeff Adduono
- Joe Ritson
- Robert Hillier
- Craig Preistlay
- Derek Levanen
- Bob MacPhail
- Neal Purdon
- Kevin Hoogsteen
- Steve Dumonski
- Sean McEachran
- Tyler Bruno
- Omer Belisle
- Trevor Abraham
- Steve L'Ecuyer
- Carl Racki
