= Lloydminster Border Kings =

Ice hockey team in Saskatchewan, Canada

The Lloydminster Border Kings were a Senior AAA ice hockey team based in Lloydminster, Saskatchewan, Canada. The team competed in the Wild Goose League in (at least) 2007–08, then in the Chinook Hockey League (CHL) from 2008–09. The team moved from the CHL to the Sask West Hockey League for the 2012–13 season. They moved again for the 2014–15 season, to the Battle River Hockey League (BRHL). When the BRHL folded before the 2015–16 season, the Border Kings attempted to join as many as three other leagues, being declined each time by the league officials; the team ceased operations at that time.

The Border Kings captured the Allan Cup – Canada's national senior championship – in 2001 and 2007. Their 2001 Allan Cup win was the first by a Saskatchewan team in 60 years, following the 1941 Regina Rangers.

== 2007 Allan Cup ==
The 2007 Allan Cup was held in Stony Plain, Alberta, from April 16–21. The Kings opened the tournament with a 4–1 loss to the Chinook League champion Bentley (Alberta) Generals. Border Kings captain Scott Hood opened the scoring, but the Generals tied it on a goal while two men short. The Kings were stymied the rest of the way.

The Kings next round robin game was against the Halifax Molson Canadians. Trailing 3–2 after two, the Kings rallied in the third for a 5–4 win. Their 1–1 record placed them second in their three team pool and set up a quarter-final match-up with the 0–2 Shawinigan Xtreme.

Shawinigan struck just 28 seconds into the game, but the Kings rallied again to lead 3–1 after 20 minutes. Lloydminster then held off the Xtreme for a 5–1 victory.

The semi-final pitted the Kings against the host Stony Plain Eagles. Once again, the Kings fell behind, trailing 3–2 after two. In the third, Aaron Foster, Dalyn Fallscheer, and Kevin Lavallee struck to vault the Kings into the lead. Stony Plain scored with 54 seconds left, but Lloydminster held on for a 5–4 victory. Whitby beat Bentley 3–2 in overtime in the other semi-final.

The championship game faced off at 7:30 PM on Saturday, April 21. Scott Hood scored short-handed to give Lloyd the lead, but Whitby tied it before the end of the first. Whitby went ahead early in the second, but then for the fourth straight game the Kings enjoyed a three-goal period, and led 4–2 after two. Whitby scored early in the third but could not pull even. The Border Kings lifted the Allan Cup after a 4–3 triumph.

Border Kings goaltender Cory McEachran was named Allan Cup MVP.

The Border Kings have hosted the Allan Cup tournament twice, in 2000 and 2005.

== Season-by-season record ==
Note: GP = Games played, W = Wins, L = Losses, T = Ties, OTL = Overtime losses, Pts = Points, GF = Goals for, GA = Goals against

Season	GP	W	L	T	OTL	GF	GA	P	Results
2008–09	24	10	12	-	2	85	99	22	4th ChHL
2009–10	20	10	7	-	3	85	78	23	4th ChHL

== See also ==
- List of ice hockey teams in Alberta
- List of ice hockey teams in Saskatchewan
- Lloydminster Bobcats
