= Île-des-Chênes North Stars =

Senior ice hockey club

- City: Île-des-Chênes, Manitoba
- League: SEMHL
- Home arena: Île-des-Chênes Arena
- Colours
- General manager: Gaetan Beauchemin
- Head coach: Mike Martens

Franchise history
- 1994–2006: Île-des-Chênes North Stars
- 2006–2007: Brandon North Stars
- 2007–2010: Steinbach North Stars
- Since 2010: Île-des-Chênes North Stars

Championships
- Allan Cups: 2003

The Île-des-Chênes North Stars are a senior ice hockey club and franchise of the South Eastern Manitoba Hockey League (SEMHL). The team plays its home games at the Île-des-Chênes Arena in Île-des-Chênes, Manitoba.

== History ==
Longtime members of the now-defunct senior/intermediate Hanover-Tache Hockey League (HTHL) until 2005, the North Stars began competing dually at the Senior A and AAA levels in 1996. The North Stars competed as an independent Senior AAA club from 2005 to 2018 and dropped back to Senior A status upon joining the CSHL in 2020.

The 2003 North Stars won the national championship Allan Cup and were later inducted into the Manitoba Hockey Hall of Fame under the team category.

In 2006, the North Stars relocated to Brandon, Manitoba for one season. This was followed by three seasons playing out of the T.G. Smith Centre in Steinbach, Manitoba

In 2009, the North Stars hosted the national championship. The 2009 team roster included former NHL players Theoren Fleury and Greg Hawgood.

In 2010, the North Stars returned to Île des Chênes and attempted to qualify for the 2011 Allan Cup, but lost to their local rivals, the South East Prairie Thunder, in the provincial playdowns. The North Stars went on hiatus after the 2010–2011 season, but returned for the 2015–16 season to participate in the 2016 Allan Cup in Steinbach.

Statistics
Season	W	L	T	OTL	Pts	Result	Playoffs
1994–95	19	5	0	---	38	1st of 8	Champions
1995–96	21	3	0	---	42	1st of 7	Champions
1996–97	18	5	0	---	36	1st of 8	Champions
1997–98	16	5	0	---	32	1st of 8	Champions
1998–99	21	3	0	---	42	1st of 7	Lost finals
1999–00	14	7	0	---	28	1st of 7	Champions
2000–01	9	16	0	---	18	5th of 6	Lost 1st Round 4–0 vs Springfield 98s
2001–02	23	1	0	---	46	1st of 7	Lost semifinals 4–2 vs La Broquerie Habs
2002–03	19	4	1	1	40	1st of 6	Lost finals 4–1 vs La Broquerie Habs
2003–04	13	7	0	0	26	2nd of 5	Lost finals 4–0 vs Springfield 98s
2004–05	5	11	0	0	10	3rd of 4	Lost semifinals 4–0 vs Springfield 98s

== National championships ==
The North Stars made their first Allan Cup appearance in 1998. They captured their first and only national championship at the 2003 Allan Cup in Dundas, Ontario. In 2009, the North Stars hosted the Allen Cup in Steinbach and were eliminated in the semifinal. In 2016, the North Stars competed for the Allen Cup in Steinbach and were eliminated in the quarterfinal.

Year	W	L	T	Result
1998	1	2	1	Lost semifinal 5–4 (3OT) vs London Admirals
2003	3	1	0	Won Allan Cup 3–2 (2OT) vs Stoney Plain Eagles
2009	2	2	0	Lost semifinal 4–2 vs South East Prairie Thunder
2016	0	3	0	Lost quarterfinal 3–1 vs South East Prairie Thunder

== See also ==
- List of ice hockey teams in Manitoba
