= Allan Cup =

Canadian trophy for national senior amateur men's ice hockey champions

- The Allan Cup trophy
- Sport: Ice hockey
- Awarded for: Senior champion of Canada

History
- First award: 1909
- Most wins: Port Arthur Bearcats/Thunder Bay Twins (9)
- Most recent: Clarenville Caribous (2026)

The Allan Cup is the trophy awarded annually to the senior ice hockey champions of Canada. It was donated by Sir Montagu Allan of Ravenscrag, Montreal, and has been competed for since 1909. It was most recently won by the Clarenville Caribous in 2026.

== History ==
In 1908, a split occurred in the competition of ice hockey in Canada. The top amateur teams left the Eastern Canada Amateur Hockey Association, which allowed professionals, to form the new Inter-Provincial Amateur Hockey Union (IPAHU), a purely amateur league. The trustees of the Stanley Cup decided that the Cup would be awarded to the professional ice champion, meaning there was no corresponding trophy for the amateur championship of Canada. The Allan Cup was donated in early 1909 by Montreal businessman and Montreal Amateur Athletic Association president Sir H. Montagu Allan to be presented to the amateur champions of Canada. It was to be ruled like the Stanley Cup had, passed by champion to champion by league championship or challenge. Three trustees were named to administer the trophy: Sir Edward Clouston, President of the Bank of Montreal, Dr. H. B. Yates of McGill University, (donor of the Yates Cup to the Intercollegiate Rugby Union in 1898) and Graham Drinkwater, four-time Stanley Cup champion.

The trophy was originally presented to the Victoria Hockey Club of Montreal, Quebec, members of the IPAHU, to award to the champions of the IPAHU. The first IPAHU champion, and by extension, first winner of the Cup was the Ottawa Cliffsides hockey club. After the season, the Cliffsides were defeated in the first-ever challenge by the Queen's University hockey club of Kingston, Ontario.

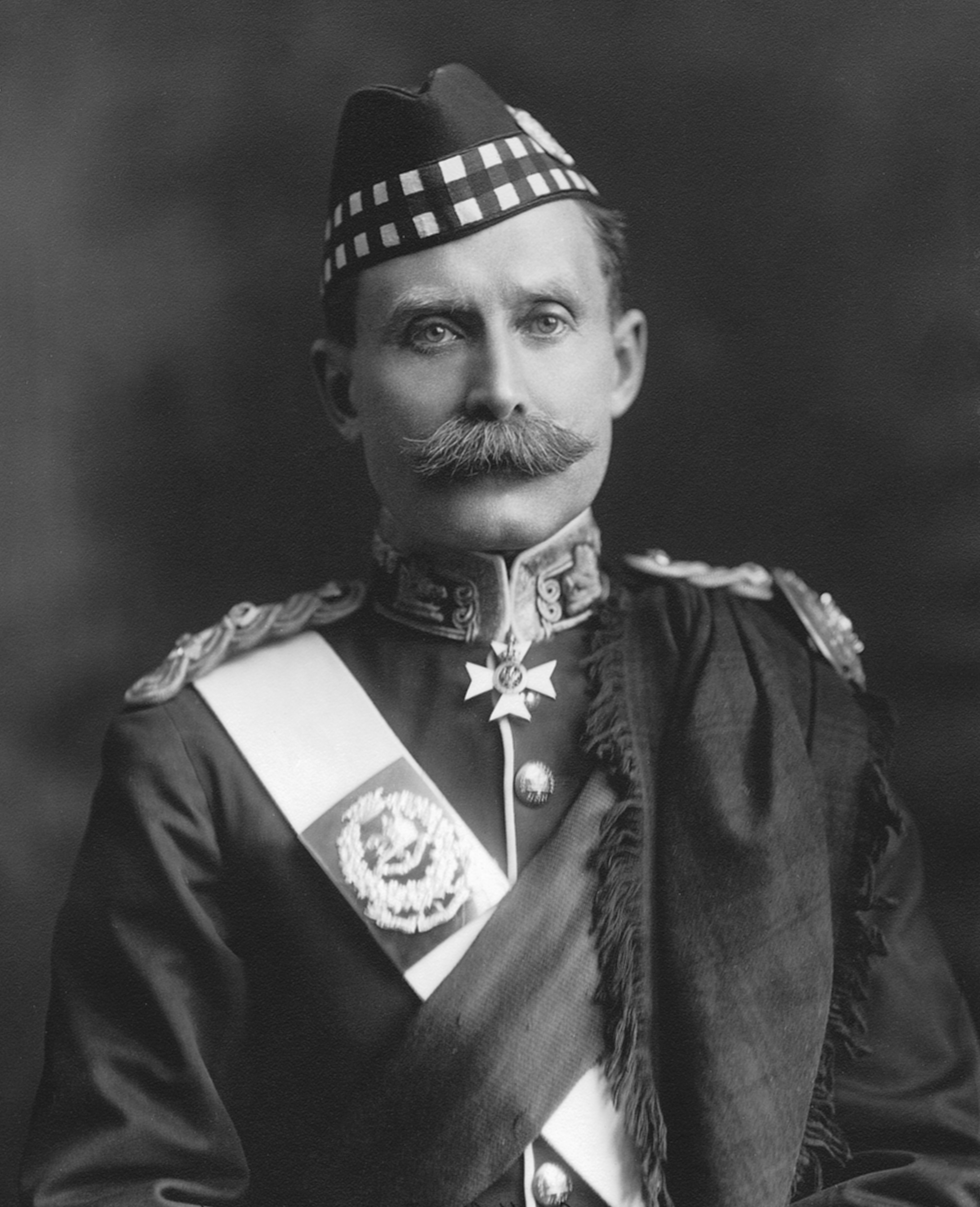
H. Montagu Allan

In the early years, trustees of the Cup quickly came to appreciate the difficulties of organizing a national competition in so large a country. In 1914, at the suggestion of one of the trustees, Claude C. Robinson, the Canadian Amateur Hockey Association (CAHA) was formed as a national governing body for the sport with W. F. Taylor as its first president. One of the CAHA's first decisions, in 1915, was to replace the challenge system with a series of national playoffs. Starting in 1920, the Allan Cup champion team would represent Canada in amateur play at the Olympics and World Championships. The CAHA used the profits from Allan Cup games as a subsidy for the national team. Competition for the cup was originally a one-game format, then a two-game total goals format. In 1925, CAHA leaders Silver Quilty and Frank Sandercock, changed the format to a best-of-three series due to increased popularity of the games and demand for a longer series.

At the CAHA general meeting in March 1927, W. A. Fry requested to have the CAHA take control of the Allan Cup and its profits from the trustees, and use the funds to build amateur hockey in Canada. He felt the move justified as the CAHA had evolved and was able to manage its own affairs. His motion asked for H. Montagu Allan to donate the cup to the CAHA, and establish an Allan Cup committee which included trustee William Northey.

In February 1945, CAHA president Frank Sargent announced the cancellation of the 1945 Allan Cup playoffs. It was the first season in which the trophy was not contested since the inaugural 1909 Allan Cup. The cancellation was caused by the reluctance to travel during wartime conditions, and the players' need to work rather than playing hockey.

In 1951, the CAHA set up a "major league" of competition from the semi-pro and professional senior leagues. The leagues would no longer compete for the Allan Cup, but would compete for the new Alexander Cup. The Allan Cup would be competed for on a more purely amateur basis from teams in smaller centres of Canada. The major league concept broke up by 1953, and the Alexander Cup competition was retired after 1954.

The reigning Allan Cup champion was usually chosen to represent Canada in ice hockey at the Olympic Games or the Ice Hockey World Championships. The practice lasted from 1920 to 1964, when Father David Bauer established a permanent Canada men's national ice hockey team.

Since 1984 the Allan Cup has been competed for by teams in the Senior AAA category. Although interest in senior ice hockey has diminished over its history, the Cup retains an important place in Canadian ice hockey. The Cup championship is determined in an annual tournament held in the city or town of a host team, playing off against regional champions.

The Cup has been won by teams from every province and from Yukon, as well as by two teams from the United States which played in Canadian leagues. The city with the most Allan Cup championships is Thunder Bay with 10, including four won as Port Arthur before the city's amalgamation. The original Cup has been retired to the Hockey Hall of Fame, and a replica is presented to the champions.

== Allan Cup championships ==
=== Challenges ===
Listed are all of the challenges of the early years of the Allan Cup, bolded are the final winner of the season.

Allan Cup Challenge Series
Year	Champion	Finalist	Goal total	Location
1909	Ottawa Cliffsides	Initial Champion, as IPAHU Champions	--	--
	**Queen's University**	Ottawa Cliffsides	5–4 (1 gm)	Ottawa, Ontario
1910	Queen's University	McGill University	7–2 (1 gm)	Ottawa, Ontario
	Queen's University	Ottawa Cliffsides	6–3 (1 gm)	Kingston, Ontario
	Toronto St. Michael's Majors	Queen's University	5–4 (1 gm)	Kingston, Ontario
	**Toronto St. Michael's Majors**	Sherbrooke	8–3 (1 gm)	Toronto, Ontario
1911	Winnipeg Victorias	Toronto St. Michael's Majors	Default	--
	**Winnipeg Victorias**	Kenora Thistles	16–10 (2 gms)	Winnipeg, Manitoba
1912	Winnipeg Victorias	Calgary Athletic Club	19–6 (2 gms)	Winnipeg, Manitoba
	Winnipeg Victorias	Toronto Eaton's	24–5 (2 gms)	Winnipeg, Manitoba
	**Winnipeg Victorias**	Regina Capitals	9–3 (1 gm)	Winnipeg, Manitoba
1913	Winnipeg Hockey Club	Awarded as ManHL Champions	--	--
	Winnipeg Hockey Club	Moose Jaw Moose	16–3 (2 gms)	Winnipeg, Manitoba
	**Winnipeg Hockey Club**	Edmonton Eskimos	18–8 (2 gms)	Winnipeg, Manitoba
1914	Winnipeg Monarchs	Awarded as ManHL Champions	--	--
	Winnipeg Monarchs	Kenora Thistles	6–2 (1 gm)	Winnipeg, Manitoba
	Regina Victorias	Winnipeg Monarchs	5–4 (1 gm)	Winnipeg, Manitoba
	**Regina Victorias**	Grand-Mère	10–5 (2 gms)	Regina, Saskatchewan
1915	Melville Millionaires	Awarded as SSHL Champions	--	--
	Melville Millionaires	Prince Albert Mintos	15–13 (2 gms)	Melville/Prince Albert, Saskatchewan
	Melville Millionaires	Toronto Victorias	15–11 (2 gms)	Melville, Saskatchewan
	**Winnipeg Monarchs**	Melville Millionaires	7–6 (2 gms)	Melville, Saskatchewan
1916	Winnipeg 61st Battalion	Winnipeg Monarchs	11–10 (2 gms)	Winnipeg, Manitoba
	Winnipeg 61st Battalion	Winnipeg Victorias	5–3 (1 gm)	Winnipeg, Manitoba
	Winnipeg 61st Battalion	Fort William	8–6 (2 gms)	Winnipeg, Manitoba
	**Winnipeg 61st Battalion**	Regina Victorias	13–3 (2 gms)	Winnipeg, Manitoba
1917	Winnipeg Victorias	Awarded as WPL Champions	--	--
	Winnipeg Victorias	Winnipeg Union Canadienne	22–11 (2 gms)	Winnipeg, Manitoba
	Winnipeg Victorias	Winnipeg 221st Battalion	11–5 (2 gms)	Winnipeg, Manitoba
	Winnipeg Victorias	Port Arthur 141st Battalion	10–5 (2 gms)	Winnipeg, Manitoba
	**Toronto Dentals**	Winnipeg Victorias	13–12 (2 gms)	Winnipeg, Manitoba
1918	Kitchener Greenshirts	Toronto Dentals	7–4 (2 gms)	Kitchener/Toronto, Ontario
	Kitchener Greenshirts	Port Arthur Columbus Club	20–2 (1 gm)	Toronto, Ontario
	**Kitchener Greenshirts**	Winnipeg Ypres	6–4 (2 gms)	Toronto, Ontario

=== Playoffs ===
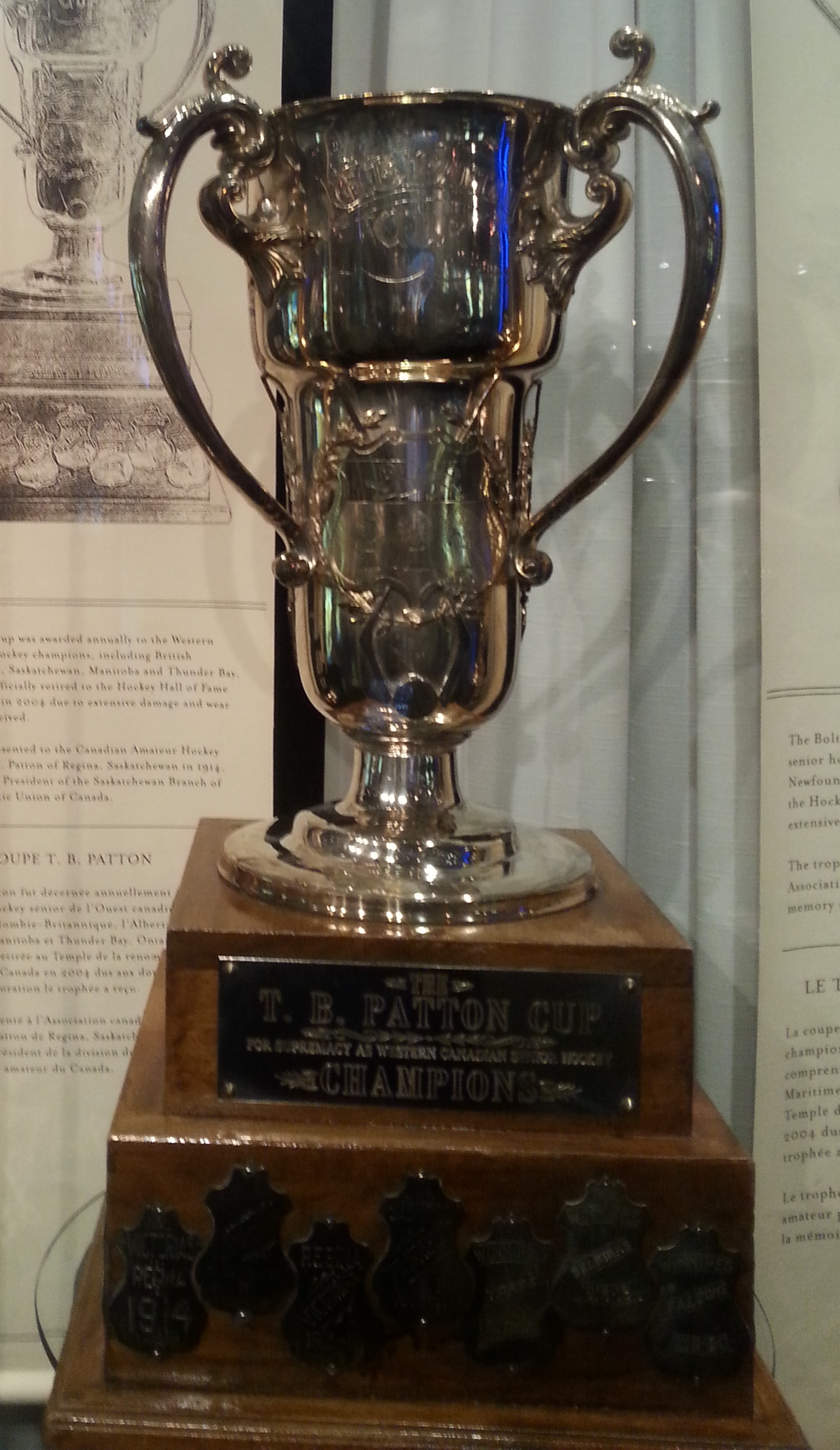
The T. B. Patton Cup was the championship trophy for amateur senior ice hockey in Western Canada.

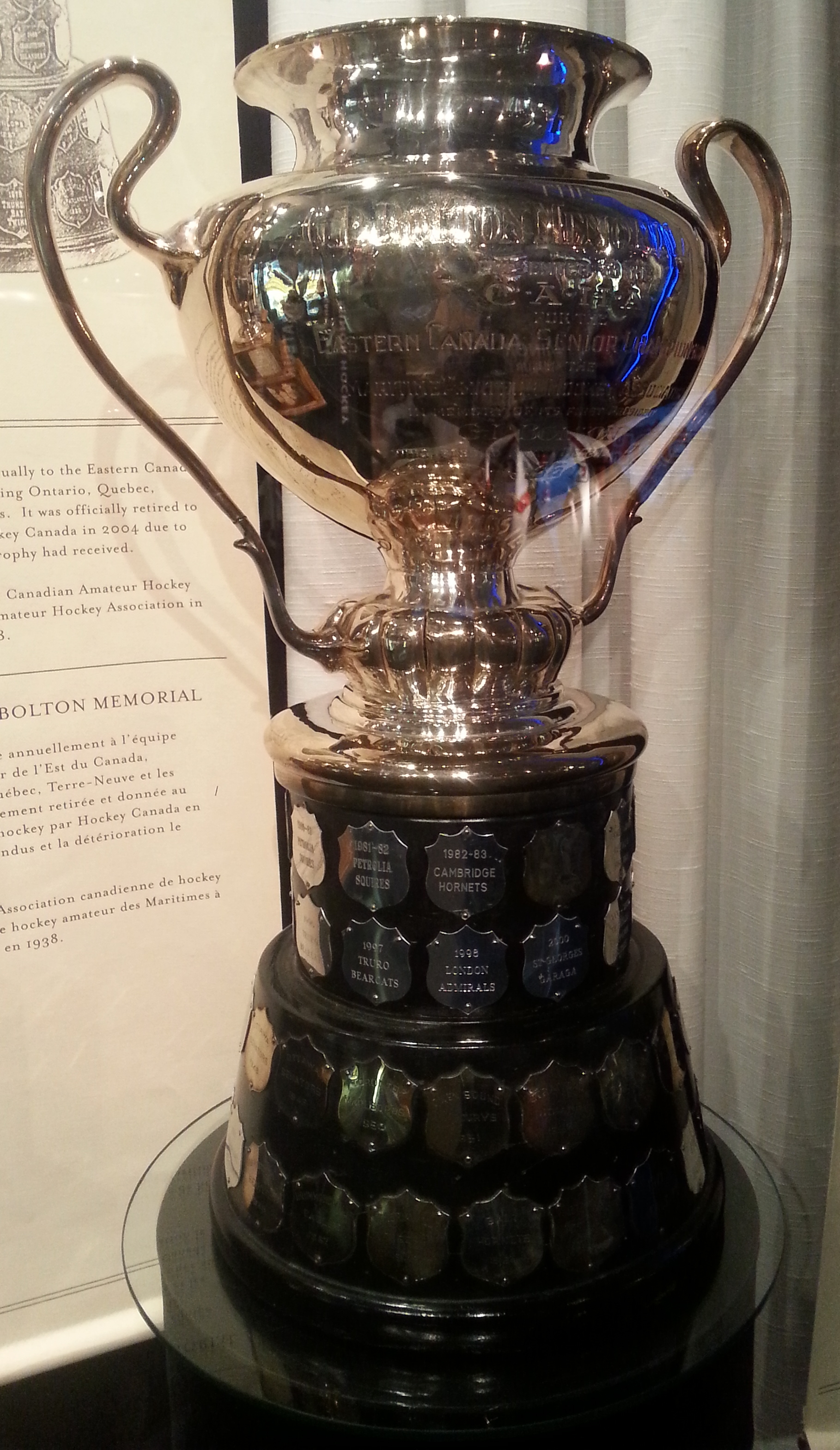
The G. P. Bolton Memorial Trophy was the championship trophy for amateur senior ice hockey in Eastern Canada.

Allan Cup Final Series/Round Robins
Year	Eastern Finalist	Western Finalist	Series	Primary Location
1919	**Hamilton Tigers**	Winnipeg Selkirks	7–6 (gls)	Toronto, Ontario
1920	University of Toronto	**Winnipeg Falcons**	5–11 (gls)	Toronto, Ontario
1921	**University of Toronto**	Brandon	8–3 (gls)	Winnipeg, Manitoba
1922	**Toronto Granites**	Regina Victorias	13–2 (gls)	Toronto, Ontario
1923	**Toronto Granites**	University of Saskatchewan	11–2 (gls)	Winnipeg, Manitoba
1924	**Sault Ste. Marie Greyhounds**	Winnipeg Selkirks	6–3 (gls)	Toronto, Ontario
1925	University of Toronto	**Port Arthur Bearcats**	0–2	Winnipeg, Manitoba
1926	University of Toronto	**Port Arthur Bearcats**	1–2–1	Toronto, Ontario*
1927	**University of Toronto Grads**	Fort William Thundering Herd	2–1–1	Vancouver, British Columbia
1928	Montreal Victorias	**University of Manitoba Bisons**	1–2	Ottawa, Ontario
1929	Montreal St-Francois Xavier	**Port Arthur Bearcats**	0–2–1	Winnipeg, Manitoba
1930	**Montreal Hockey Club**	Port Arthur Bearcats	2–0	Toronto, Ontario
1931	Hamilton Tigers	**Winnipeg Hockey Club**	0–2	Winnipeg, Manitoba
1932	**Toronto National Sea Fleas**	Fort William Blues	2–0	Montreal, Quebec
1933	**Moncton Hawks**	Saskatoon Quakers	2–0	Vancouver, British Columbia
1934	**Moncton Hawks**	Fort William Beavers	2–1	Toronto, Ontario
1935	**Halifax Wolverines**	Port Arthur Bearcats	2–0	Halifax, Nova Scotia
1936	Sudbury Falcons	**Kimberley Dynamiters**	0–2	Winnipeg, Manitoba
1937	**Sudbury Tigers**	North Battleford Beavers	3–2	Calgary, Alberta
1938	Cornwall Flyers	**Trail Smoke Eaters**	1–3	Calgary, Alberta
1939	Royal Montreal Hockey Club	**Port Arthur Bearcats**	1–3	Montreal, Quebec
1940	**Kirkland Lake Blue Devils**	Calgary Stampeders	3–0	Toronto, Ontario
1941	Sydney Millionaires	**Regina Rangers**	2–3–1	Regina, Saskatchewan
1942	**Ottawa RCAF Flyers**	Port Arthur Bearcats	3–2	Ottawa, Ontario*
1943	**Ottawa Army Commandos**	Victoria Army	3–1	Calgary, Alberta*
1944	**Quebec Aces**	Port Arthur Shipbuilders	3–0	Quebec City, Quebec
1944–1945 competition was suspended due to World War II
1946	Hamilton Tigers	**Calgary Stampeders**	1–4	Calgary, Alberta*
1947	**Royal Montreal Hockey Club**	Calgary Stampeders	4–3	Montreal, Quebec*
1948	Ottawa Senators	**Edmonton Flyers**	1–4	Edmonton, Alberta*
1949	**Ottawa Senators**	Regina Capitals	4–1	Ottawa, Ontario*
1950	**Toronto Marlboros**	Calgary Stampeders	4–1	Calgary, Alberta*
1951	**Owen Sound Mercurys**	Fort Frances Canadians	4–3	Owen Sound, Ontario
1952	Stratford Indians	**Fort Frances Canadians**	2–4	Fort Frances, Ontario
1953	**Kitchener-Waterloo Flying Dutchmen**	Penticton V's	4–1	Kitchener, Ontario
1954	Sudbury Wolves	**Penticton V's**	3–4	Penticton, British Columbia*
1955	**Kitchener-Waterloo Flying Dutchmen**	Fort William Beavers	4–1	Kitchener, Ontario
1956	Chatham Maroons	**Vernon Canadians**	1–4	Vernon, British Columbia*
1957	**Whitby Dunlops**	Spokane Flyers	4–0	Toronto, Ontario
1958	**Belleville McFarlands**	Kelowna Packers	4–3	Kelowna, British Columbia*
1959	**Whitby Dunlops**	Vernon Canadians	4–0	Toronto, Ontario
1960	**Chatham Maroons**	Trail Smoke Eaters	4–0–1	Trail, British Columbia
1961	**Galt Terriers**	Winnipeg Maroons	4–1	Galt, Ontario
1962	Montreal Olympics	**Trail Smoke Eaters**	1–4	Trail, British Columbia
1963	**Windsor Bulldogs**	Winnipeg Maroons	4–1	Windsor, Ontario
1964	Woodstock Athletics	**Winnipeg Maroons**	0–4	Winnipeg, Manitoba
1965	**Sherbrooke Beavers**	Nelson Maple Leafs	4–0	Sherbrooke, Quebec
1966	Sherbrooke Beavers	**Drumheller Miners**	2–4	Calgary, Alberta
1967	**Drummondville Eagles**	Calgary Spurs	4–0	Drummondville, Quebec
1968	**Victoriaville Tigres**	St. Boniface Mohawks	4–1	Winnipeg, Manitoba
1969	**Galt Hornets**	Calgary Stampeders	4–0	Galt, Ontario
1970	Orillia Terriers	**Spokane Jets**	2–4	Spokane, Washington
1971	**Galt Hornets**	Calgary Stampeders	4–0	Galt, Ontario
1972	Barrie Flyers	**Spokane Jets**	2–4	Spokane, Washington*
1973	**Orillia Terriers**	St. Boniface Mohawks	4–1	Orillia, Ontario
1974	**Barrie Flyers**	Cranbrook Royals	4–2	Cranbrook, British Columbia
1975	Barrie Flyers	**Thunder Bay Twins**	2–4	Thunder Bay, Ontario
1976	Barrie Flyers	**Spokane Flyers**	0–4	Spokane, Washington
1977	**Brantford Alexanders**	Spokane Flyers	4–1	Brantford, Ontario
1978	Brantford Alexanders	**Kimberley Dynamiters**	1–4	Kimberley, British Columbia
1979	**Petrolia Squires**	Steinbach Huskies	4–1	Sarnia, Ontario
1980	Cambridge Hornets	**Spokane Flyers**	0–4	Spokane, Washington
Year	Champion	Runner-Up	Final score	Location
1981	**Petrolia Squires**	St. Boniface Mohawks	5–1	Thunder Bay, Ontario
Year	Eastern Finalist	Western Finalist	Series	Primary Location
1982	Petrolia Squires	**Cranbrook Royals**	1–4	Cranbrook, British Columbia
1983	**Cambridge Hornets**	St. Boniface Mohawks	4–0	Cambridge, Ontario
1984	Cambridge Hornets	**Thunder Bay Twins**	1–4	Thunder Bay, Ontario
1985	Corner Brook Royals	**Thunder Bay Twins**	3–4	Corner Brook, Newfoundland
1986	**Corner Brook Royals**	Nelson Maple Leafs	4–0	Nelson, British Columbia
1987	**Brantford Motts Clamatos**	Nelson Maple Leafs	4–0	Brampton, Ontario
1988	Charlottetown Islanders	**Thunder Bay Twins**	0–4	Thunder Bay, Ontario
Year	Champion	Runner-Up	Final Series	Location
1989	**Thunder Bay Twins**	St. Boniface Mohawks	2–0 (Best-of-3)	Thunder Bay, Ontario
Year	Eastern Finalist	Western Finalist	Series	Primary Location
1990	**Montreal-Chomedey Construction**	Abbotsford Flyers	4–2	Vaudreuil, Quebec
1991	**Charlottetown Islanders**	Thunder Bay Twins	4–0	Thunder Bay, Ontario
Year	Champion	Runner-Up	Final score	Location
1992	**Saint John Vito's**	Stony Plain Eagles	6–2	Saint John, New Brunswick
1993	**Whitehorse Huskies**	Quesnel Kangaroos	7–4	Quesnel, British Columbia
1994	**Warroad Lakers**	St. Boniface Mohawks	5–2	Warroad, Minnesota
1995	**Warroad Lakers**	Stony Plain Eagles	3–2	Stony Plain, Alberta
1996	**Warroad Lakers**	Stony Plain Eagles	6–1	Unity, Saskatchewan
1997	**Powell River Regals**	Warroad Lakers	7–3	Powell River, British Columbia
1998	**Truro Bearcats**	London Admirals	6–1	Truro, Nova Scotia
1999	**Stony Plain Eagles**	Powell River Regals	6–3	Stony Plain, Alberta
2000	**Powell River Regals**	Lloydminster Border Kings	4–1	Lloydminster, Saskatchewan
2001	**Lloydminster Border Kings**	Petrolia Squires	7–2	Sarnia, Ontario
2002	**St-Georges Garaga**	Stony Plain Eagles	4–2	Powell River, British Columbia
2003	**Île-des-Chênes North Stars**	Stony Plain Eagles	3–2 (2OT)	Dundas, Ontario
2004	**St-Georges Garaga**	Ministikwan Islanders	5–0	Saint-Georges, Quebec
2005	**Thunder Bay Bombers**	Montmagny Sentinelles	4–3	Lloydminster, Saskatchewan
2006	**Powell River Regals**	Whitby Dunlops	7–1	Powell River, British Columbia
2007	**Lloydminster Border Kings**	Whitby Dunlops	4–3	Stony Plain, Alberta
2008	**Brantford Blast**	Bentley Generals	3–1	Brantford, Ontario
2009	**Bentley Generals**	South East Prairie Thunder	4–3 (2OT)	Steinbach, Manitoba
2010	**Fort St. John Flyers**	Bentley Generals	4–1	Fort St. John, British Columbia
2011	**Clarenville Caribous**	Bentley Generals	5–3	Kenora, Ontario
2012	**South East Prairie Thunder**	Rosetown Red Wings	4–1	Lloydminster, Saskatchewan
2013	**Bentley Generals**	Clarenville Caribous	3–0	Red Deer, Alberta
2014	**Dundas Real McCoys**	Clarenville Caribous	3–2 (2OT)	Dundas, Ontario
2015	**South East Prairie Thunder**	Bentley Generals	2–0	Clarenville, Newfoundland and Labrador
2016	**Bentley Generals**	South East Prairie Thunder	4–3 (OT)	Steinbach, Manitoba
2017	**Grand Falls-Windsor Cataracts**	Lacombe Generals	7–4	Bouctouche, New Brunswick
2018	**Stoney Creek Generals**	Lacombe Generals	7–4	Rosetown, Saskatchewan
2019	**Lacombe Generals**	Innisfail Eagles	5–2	Lacombe, Alberta
2020	cancelled due to COVID-19 pandemic			Hamilton, Ontario
2021	cancelled due to COVID-19 pandemic			Hamilton, Ontario
2022	cancelled due to COVID-19 pandemic			Hamilton, Ontario
2023	**Dundas Real McCoys**	Clarenville Caribous	5–3	Dundas, Ontario
2024	**Dundas Real McCoys**	Southern Shore Breakers	6–1	Dundas, Ontario
2025	**Wentworth Gryphins**	Clarenville Caribous	9–5	Waterdown, Ontario
2026	Clarenville Caribous	Stoney Creek Tigers	6–3	Conception Bay South, Newfoundland and Labrador

Notes
{*} denotes event held in multiple locations

== Most championships by province ==
This is a list of champions by province, territory, or state.

Allan Cups by province/state
Rank	Region	Championships
1	Ontario	52
2	Manitoba	12
3	British Columbia	11
4	Quebec	9
5	Alberta	8*
6	Newfoundland and Labrador	5
7	Saskatchewan	4*
-	Washington	4
9	Minnesota	3
-	New Brunswick	3
-	Nova Scotia	2
12	Prince Edward Island	1
-	Yukon	1

(*) Two championships won by teams from Lloydminster are included only in the total for Saskatchewan.

== See also ==
- Allan Cup Hockey
- Clarkson Cup
- Hardy Cup (ice hockey)
