= W. A. Fry =

Canadian sport administrator and newspaper publisher (1872–1944)

- Born: William Alexander Fry; September 7, 1872; Dunnville, Ontario, Canada
- Died: April 21, 1944 (aged 71); Hamilton, Ontario, Canada
- Occupation: Newspaper publisher
- Years active: 1896–1944
- Known for: Amateur Athletic Union of Canada; Canadian Olympic Committee; British Empire Games; Canadian Amateur Hockey Association; Ontario Hockey Association

William Alexander Fry (September 7, 1872 – April 21, 1944) was a Canadian sports administrator and newspaper publisher. Fry founded the Dunnville Chronicle in 1896, managed local hockey and baseball teams in the 1910s, then served as president of the Ontario Hockey Association (OHA) from 1922 to 1924. At the national level, he was president of the Canadian Amateur Hockey Association (CAHA) from 1928 to 1930, was a Canadian Olympic Committee member and British Empire Games committee member from 1927 to 1938, and served as president of the Amateur Athletic Union of Canada (AAU of C) from 1934 to 1936.

He sought better working relationships with the National Hockey League and the American Amateur Athletic Union, to compensate Canadian teams for developing senior ice hockey players. He aimed to implement standardized ice hockey rules for all leagues under CAHA jurisdiction. He recommended control of the Allan Cup be transferred from its trustees to the CAHA, who then reinvested profits into minor ice hockey in Canada. This coincided with growing interest in the playoffs for the Allan Cup and Memorial Cup.

He presided over the AAU of C when it was losing direct control of amateur sport in Canada, and had recently split ways with the Canadian Track and Field Association. The CAHA, the Canadian Lacrosse Association and the Canadian Amateur Basketball Association were each challenging the definition of what was an amateur athlete. He was against profiting from sports, believed in maintaining the ideals of amateur sport and wanted the younger generation "to play the game for the game's sake". When it became apparent the CAHA was close to breaking away from the AAU of C in 1936, he said the decision was "the most important matter ever to come before an amateur body in Canada". In defending the old definition of amateur, journalist Ralph Allen compared Fry to a captain sinking with his ship; whereas journalist and former Olympian Bobbie Rosenfeld remembered Fry as a man who fought for true amateurism in sport, in the face of growing professionalism.

He retired from sports in 1938, and his career was recognized with life membership in the CAHA and the OHA, and an appointment to Ontario Athletic Commission.

== Early life and newspaper business ==
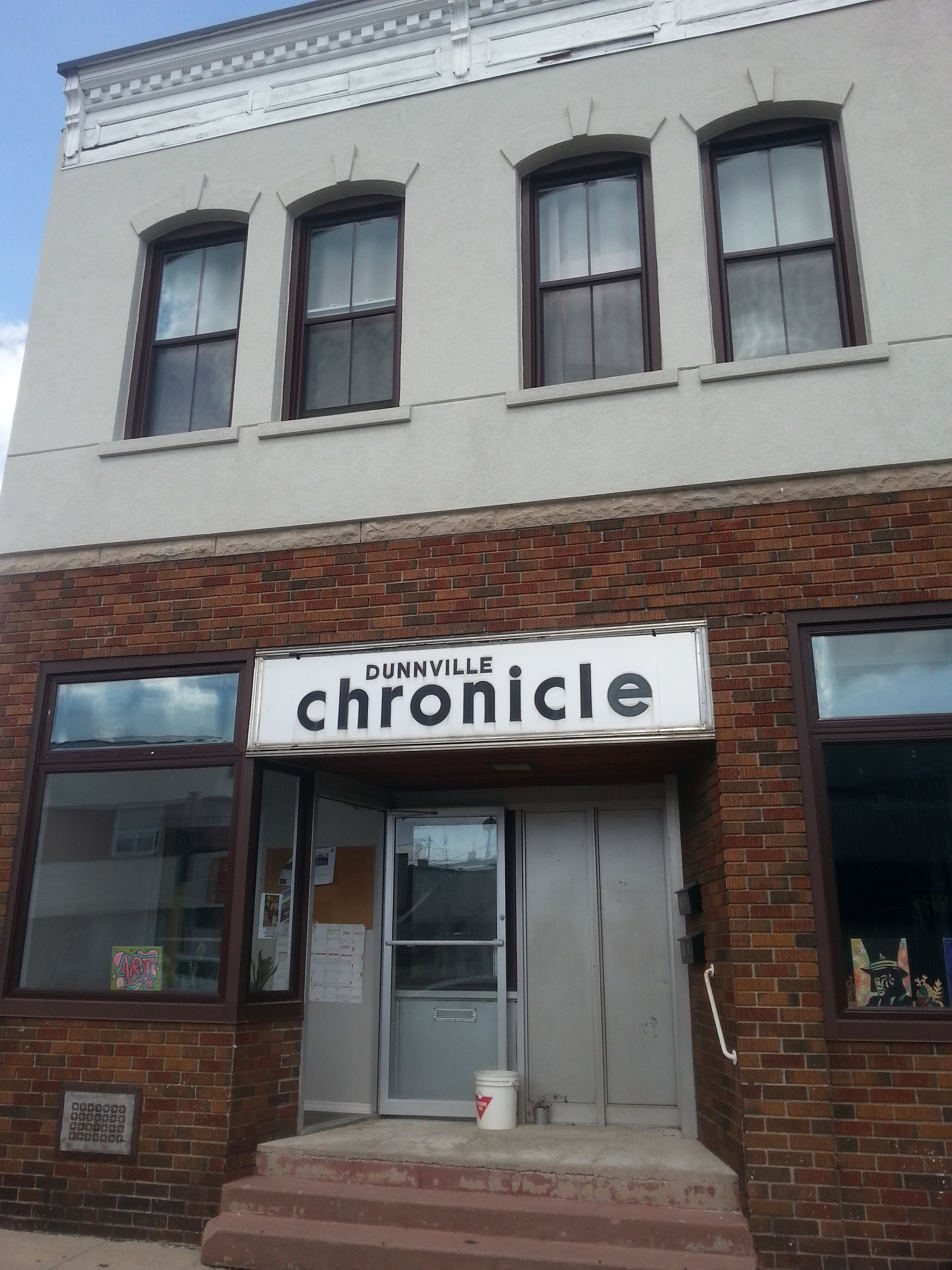
The Dunnville Chronicle building exterior (pictured in 2019) remains unchanged since the newspaper printed its final edition in 2012.

Fry was born on September 7, 1872, in Dunnville, Ontario, the son of Dr. and Mrs. J. S. Fry. He attended Dunnville Secondary School until age 16, then began working full-time in the newspaper business. He was hired in 1888 as apprentice by Robert White, publisher of the Dunnville Gazette. Fry worked for two years at the Gazette then moved to Ingersoll, Ontario, at age 18. He apprenticed four years with the Ingersoll Chronicle, then later worked six-month tenures in Tillsonburg, and Buffalo, New York. During the five years as a newspaper apprentice, he learned the trade including editorials, advertising, typesetting and running printing presses.

Fry returned to Dunnville in 1896 at age 24, and founded his own paper named the Dunnville Chronicle. He purchased the printing business owned by A. M. Moote, and added a hand-operated Washington press with financial assistance from his brother. The first issue was published on September 4, 1896, and competed directly with the Gazette and Monck Reformer in a town of approximately 2,000 people. He priced subscriptions for the Chronicle at $1 per 15 months, which undercut his Gazette competition at $1 per 12 months. He adopted a motto for the Chronicle; "For the Cause that Lacks Assistance – 'Gainst the Wrongs that Need Resistance – For the Future in the Distance – And the Good that We Can Do". Writer Harold Melick stated the motto was likely derived from a poem by Scottish Anglican divine Thomas Guthrie.

Fry also grew his business by handling printing contracts for local municipalities. He regularly upgraded printing equipment to stay ahead of his competitors, and maintain printing contracts. He installed a hand-powered Taylor drum cylinder in 1900, then added a natural gas engine in 1902 to run the press. He installed a linotype machine in 1907 which enabled his paper to run its own stories in a quicker timeframe, rather than republishing material from out of town papers. He upgraded the linotype in 1921, and expanded the format from six to eight columns per page when he installed a Babcock Optimus press in 1928. Fry moved his business to a larger building in 1903, and again in 1926. He outlasted the Monck Reformer which ceased operation in 1925, then bought the assets of the Gazette in 1940 after its owner died.

Fry was a member of the Canadian Weekly Newspapers Association, and participated in its annual conventions. He wrote a weekly editorial in the Chronicle known as "Old Bill's Column", including his own wit and observations. In an interview given with the Toronto Star in 1935, Fry explained his desire to stay with a weekly paper by stating, "I'm smarter than the daily paper guys. The weekly doesn't get you down".

=== Community involvement ===
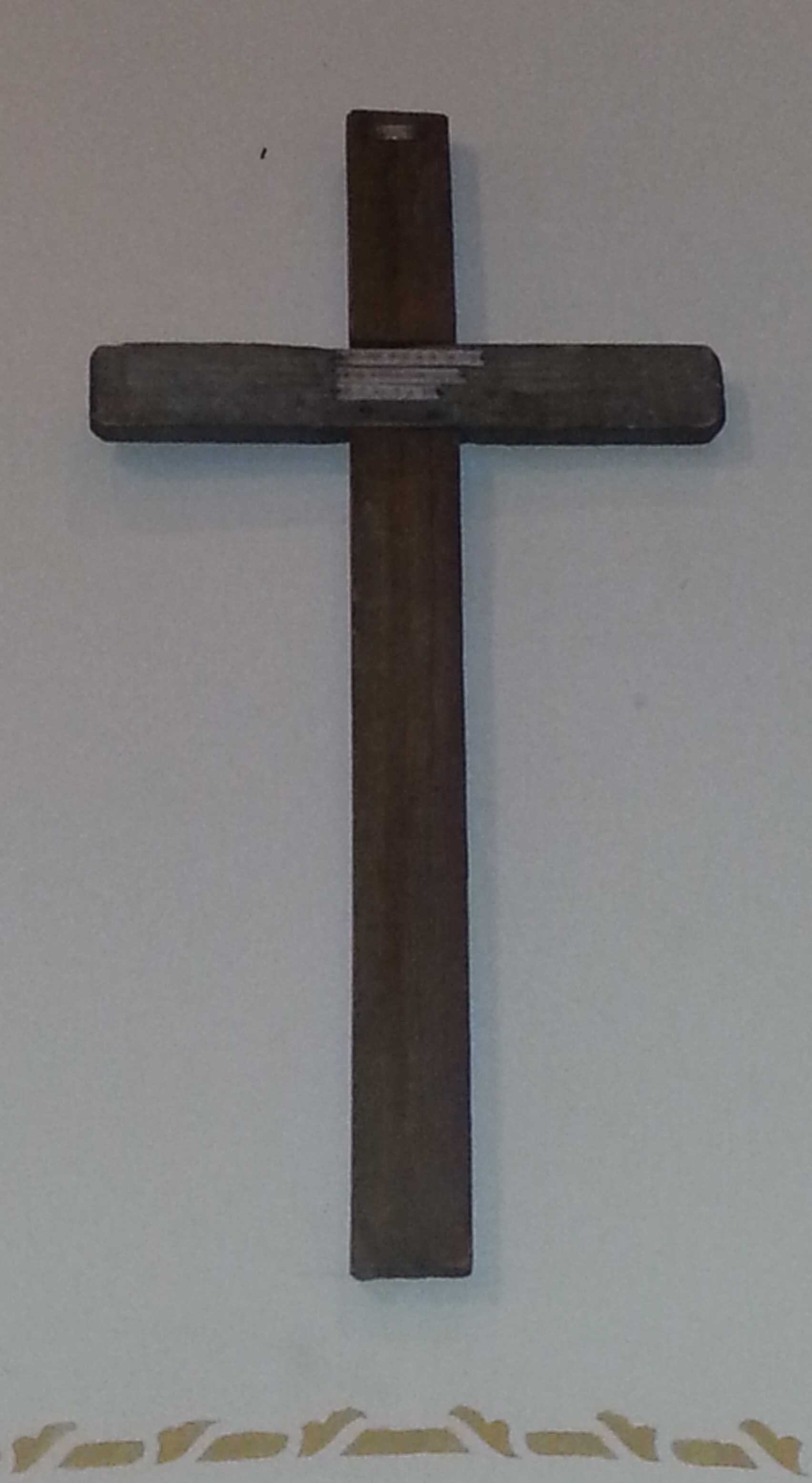
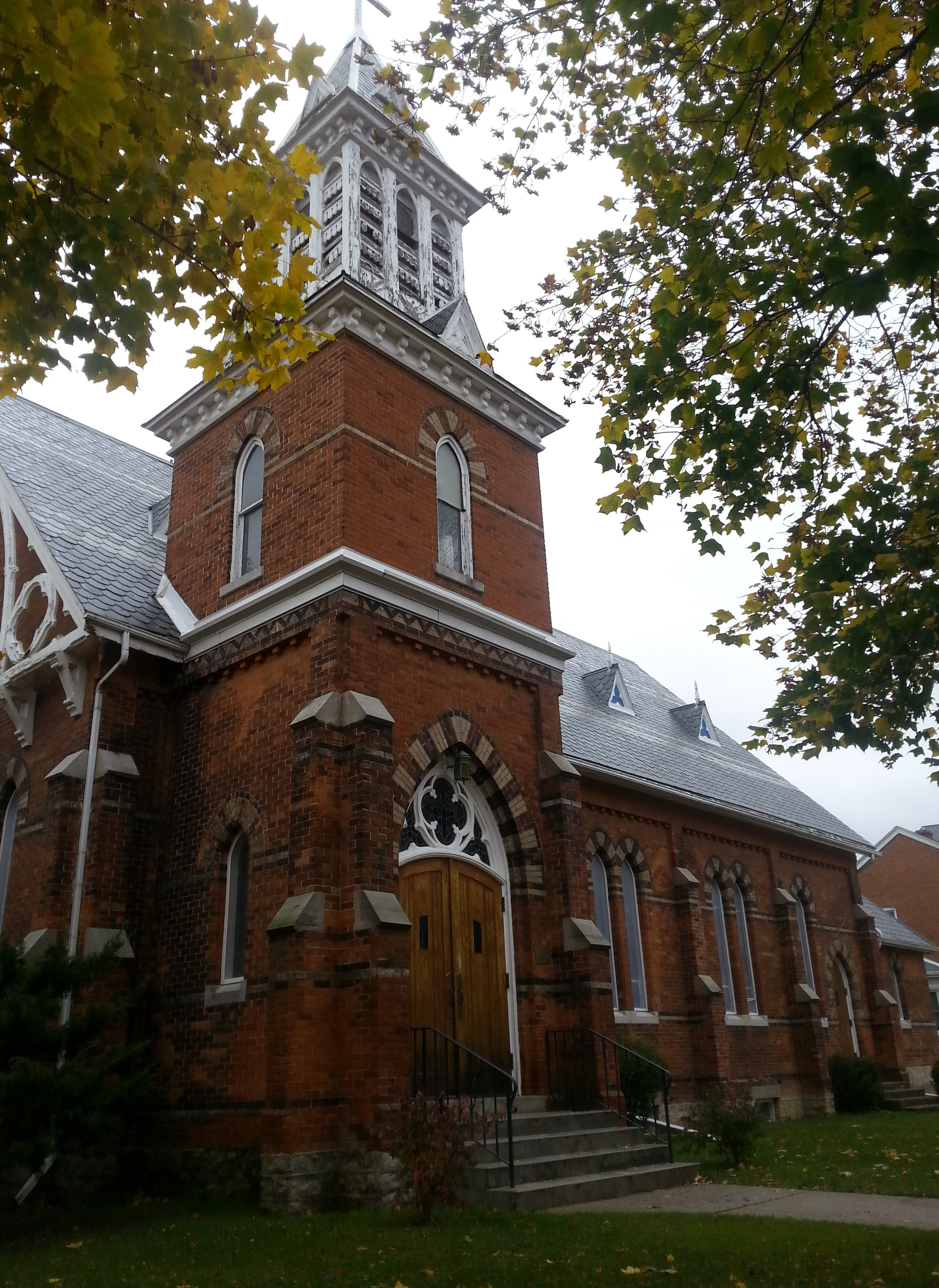
One of the two World War I crosses Fry brought back from Europe hangs above the inside of the front door to St. Paul's Anglican Church in Dunnville, where he served as choir director.

Fry was involved in local sports including baseball and ice hockey teams. He was the baseball manager of the 1907 Dunnville club, which won 17 games, lost six and tied one game during the season. The team played home games at Jubilee Park in Dunnville, and regular opponents included teams from Brantford, Buffalo, Hamilton and Welland.

Fry stated in a 1935 interview, that his first love for a sport was ice hockey. He served as the business manager and secretary for the Dunnville Mudcats hockey club, which competed in the intermediate division of the Ontario Hockey Association (OHA) during the 1910s. The team's name derived from Fry's interest in mudcat fishing in the nearby Grand River.

Fry was a member of the local Lions Club and the Masonic lodge. He provided space upstairs from his printing shop for the Dunnville Masonic Temple. His service to local organizations included being a director and treasurer of the Dunnville Agricultural Society Fair in 1908, the local chamber of commerce, the board of governors for the Haldimand War Memorial Hospital, and the Dunnville public utility commissioner. Despite his involvement in service groups, he declined more than once to be a candidate for mayor of Dunnville when asked.

Fry had community musical interests, and played cornet in the Dunnville band. He managed the local opera house, directed and produced performances of H.M.S. Pinafore at several theatres, sang as a tenor, and served as choir director of St. Paul's Anglican Church in Dunnville during World War I.

After the war, Fry and fellow members of the Canadian Weekly Newspapers Association travelled to France and Belgium and visited graves of fallen Canadian soldiers. He located the graves of two soldiers from Dunnville on request of the parents of Arthur Smith and Fla Vanderburgh. He negotiated with authorities in Europe to let him take the wooden cross grave markers back home to Canada. He reportedly never let the crosses out of his sight until delivering them personally to the parents. One of the two crosses is displayed on the wall above the front door of St. Paul's Anglican Church in Dunnville, and was featured in a Remembrance Day ceremony in 2014.

== Ontario Hockey Association ==
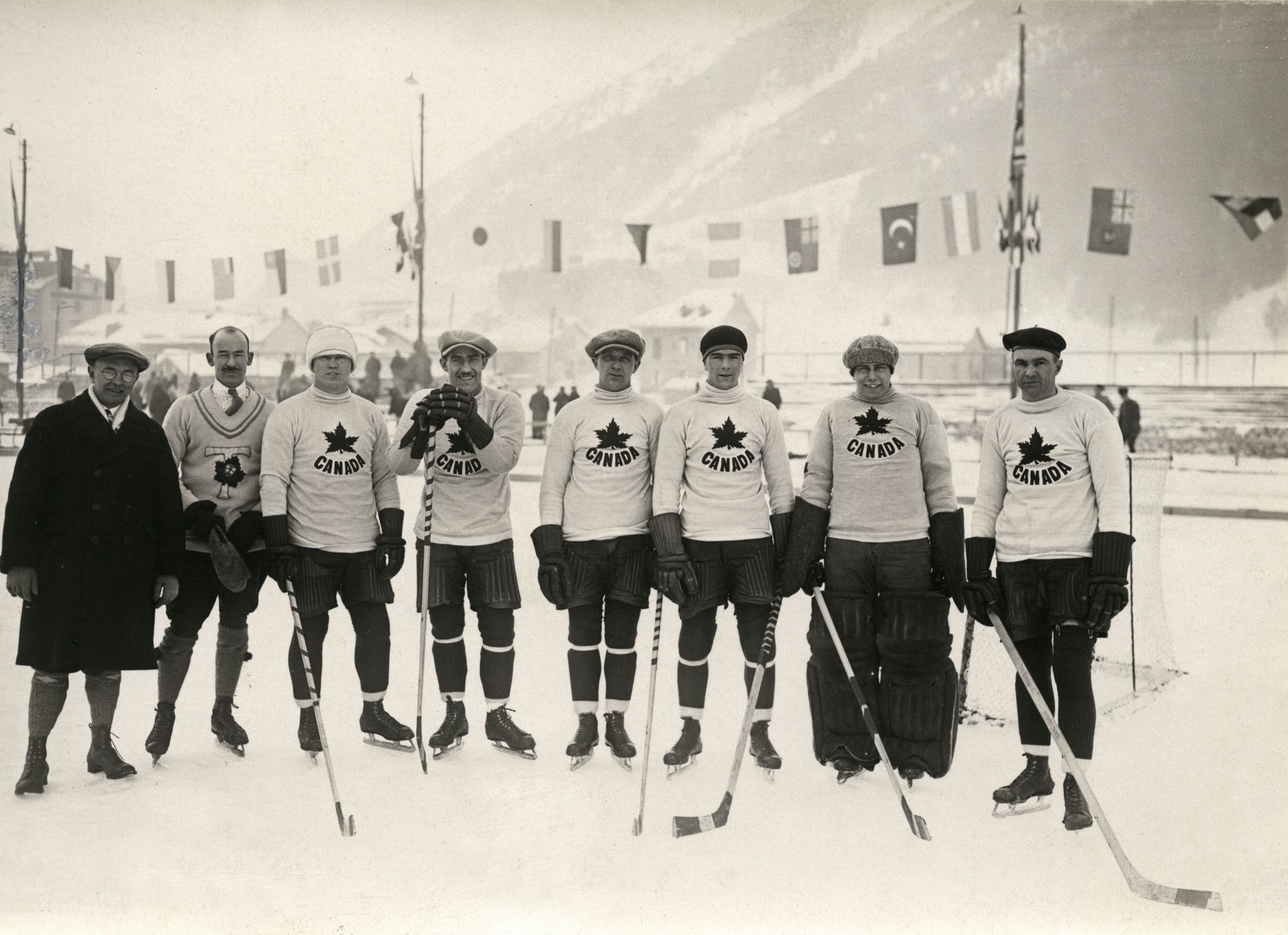
Fry recommended that the Toronto Granites (pictured) represent Canada at the 1924 Winter Olympics, who won the gold medal and World Championship title.

Fry served as a convenor with the OHA in the late 1910s, before being elected to the league executive committee. Fry was the OHA's vice-president from 1920 to 1922, then served as president from 1922 to 1924. He was acclaimed as president of the OHA, succeeding A. E. Copeland of Midland. Fry's executive committee included W. A. Hewitt as secretary, and J. F. Paxton as treasurer. Fry and his committee were re-elected in 1923.

Fry represented the OHA at the 1923 general meeting of the Canadian Amateur Hockey Association (CAHA) in Winnipeg. He asked for a discussion on body checking, and a clearer definition of what was legal. The CAHA declined to include women's hockey in its organization at the same meeting, and Fry voted against inclusion since he felt women had ample opportunity in other sports where physical contact was not a factor. Fry nominated Toby Sexsmith for a second term as CAHA president explaining that a two-year term was necessary to be effective and familiar with the issues, rather than a customary one-year term.

Fry recommended on behalf of the OHA to have the Toronto Granites as the 1923 Allan Cup champions represent Canada in ice hockey at the 1924 Winter Olympics. After the Toronto Granites won gold at the 1924 Winter Olympics, he sat on the committee to arrange a victory reception for them.

At the 1923 general meeting of the OHA, Fry introduced a motion to put $2,000 towards a World War I memorial educational scholarship at the University of Toronto for those who served in the Canadian Armed Forces. At the semi-annual CAHA meeting later in 1923, he made successful motions to eliminate commercial names from teams in the CAHA, and to strengthen the abilities for the provincial association to decide on matters under its jurisdiction.

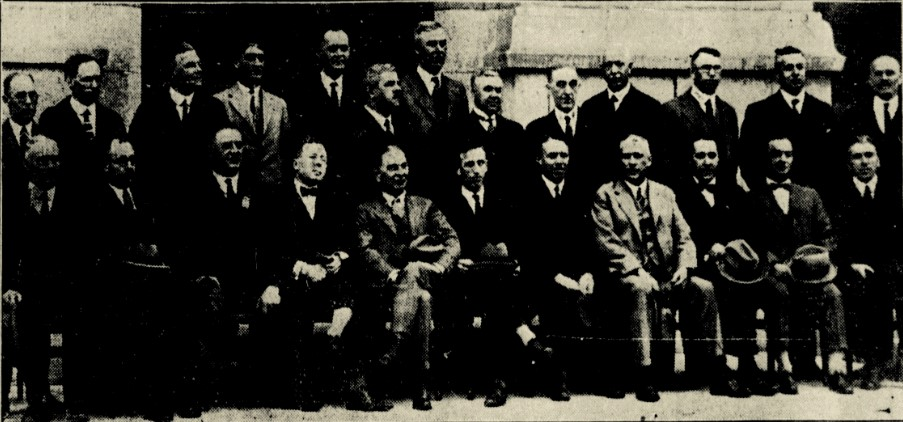
1924 Amateur Athletic Union of Canada annual meeting group photo

In April 1924, Fry spoke out against the migration of senior ice hockey players to the United States, without Canadian teams being compensated for developing those players. He looked for a working relationship between the CAHA and professional teams. At the 1924 general meeting of the CAHA, he requested better representation for Canada at the International Olympic Committee (IOC), which was represented by the Amateur Athletic Union of Canada (AAU of C). On December 2, 1924, Fry was succeeded by William Easson of Stratford as president of the OHA.

At the 1925 general meeting of the OHA, Fry advised on several issues as the past-president. He spoke against a proposal by Conn Smythe to have the Ontario Canadian Interuniversity Athletics Union champion go directly into the Eastern Canada Allan Cup playoffs, that would bypass the OHA playoffs and not guarantee an Ontario representative in the Allan Cup. When western provinces in Canada wanted to raise the junior age limit to 21, Fry noted that the OHA had more junior teams that the rest of the country combined, and there was no reason for "the tail to wag the dog", and keeping the lower age limit was a bargaining chip to gain concessions from professional teams. When proposals were tabled to prevent an OHA team from using any player who had a pending professional contract, he recommended seeking clarification from the AAU of C for the status of those players.

== Canadian Amateur Hockey Association ==
Fry sought to have control of the Allan Cup (trophy pictured) transfer from its trustees to the Canadian Amateur Hockey Association.

Fry was elected vice-president of the CAHA on March 26, 1926, and served in the role for two years. In November 1926, he recommended profits from Allan Cup playoff games exceeding $5,000 be turned over to the CAHA whose work had earned the money, instead of Allan Cup trustees dictating how the money was spent. At the CAHA general meeting in March 1927, he formally requested to have the CAHA take control of the Allan Cup and its profits from the trustees, and use the funds to build amateur hockey in Canada. He felt the move justified as the CAHA had evolved and was able to manage its own affairs. His motion asked for H. Montagu Allan to donate the cup to the CAHA, and establish an Allan Cup committee which included current trustee William Northey. Fry was re-elected vice-president on March 28, 1927. He presided over the 1928 general meeting where the commercial team names were discussed again, and the handling of expenses for the Canada men's national ice hockey team.

Fry succeeded Frank Sandercock as president of the CAHA on March 29, 1928, and the Maritime Amateur Hockey Association was welcomed as a new branch of the CAHA. He was re-elected as CAHA president and AAU of C governor on March 29, 1929. During his tenures as president, he set up a separate finance committee to oversee income and expenditures Allan cup profits. He aimed to implement standardized ice hockey rules for all leagues under CAHA jurisdiction. He was also part of the AAU of C group which selected the first members of its committee to choose which teams would represent Canada at the Olympics.

In response to the Trail Smoke Eaters being disqualified in the 1929 Allan Cup playoffs for an unsigned player, Fry motioned for any active professional athletes being banned from holding management positions on am amateur team. The CAHA executive set aside 5 percent of profits from Allan Cup and Memorial Cup games for a minor ice hockey development fund. At the end of his term as president, Fry stated that "remarkable progress" was made in Canadian amateur hockey with respect to growing interest in the playoffs for the Allan Cup and Memorial Cup, and loyalty to amateur principals of the AAU of C.

On March 29, 1930, Fry was succeeded as CAHA president by Jack Hamilton. Fry was immediately named to a committee to establish a better relationship with the professional leagues. In May 1930, Fry and W. A. Hewitt attended the 1930 general meeting of the National Hockey League (NHL) asking for a better working agreement. The CAHA recommended players remain in amateur hockey until a year after graduating from junior hockey, and offered to sanction its players to attend NHL practices, and standardize playing rules with the NHL. The CAHA continued negotiations after the NHL appointed Conn Smythe and James Strachan to a working agreement committee. Results of the negotiations where discussed at the 1933 general meeting of the CAHA, and Fry recommended that players who unsuccessfully tried out for a professional team would still retain amateur status.

== Amateur Athletic Union of Canada ==
=== Committee member ===
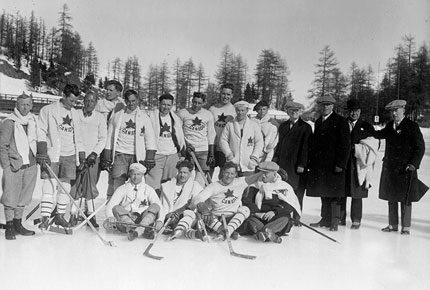
Fry accompanied the Toronto Varsity Blues team (pictured) which won the gold medal representing Canada at the 1928 Winter Olympics.

Fry was a standing committee member for the AAU of C from 1927 to 1934, and participated on the Canadian Olympic Committee and the British Empire Games committee. He regularly travelled to international sporting events at his own expense, on behalf of the CAHA and the AAU of C. At the 1927 AAU of C general meeting, he spoke against the intermingling of professionals and amateurs in baseball as proposed by Alberta, and wanted to keep amateurs separated. He accompanied the Toronto Varsity Blues men's ice hockey team won the gold medal representing Canada in ice hockey at the 1928 Winter Olympics hosted in St. Moritz, Switzerland. He was a committee member of the 1930 British Empire Games, hosted in Hamilton, Ontario.

In November 1930, Fry gave a lengthy prepared speech in response to criticism of the management of amateur sport in Canada. He stated that, "I feel that we should reiterate our continued confidence and belief in our work, and our determination to pursue it to our objective". He further defended the CAHA and the AAU of C by stating, "There was never a time in the history of the world when civilization realized more its responsibility to our youth, to the unfortunates and underprivileged, and there is no nation in the world where more time and money is being spent in living up to that responsibility than in Canada".

At the 1931 general meeting of the AAU of C, Fry was named to the legislation committee, and named chairman of the registration committee. He was also appointed as a member-at-large to the AAU of C executive committee.

Fry served on the Canadian Olympic Committee's winter sports committee to prepare for the 1932 Winter Olympics hosted in Lake Placid, New York. When the 1931 Allan Cup champions Winnipeg Hockey Club were chosen to represent Canada in ice hockey at the 1932 Winter Olympics, Fry said the team was the "best bet" Canada had in team sports at the Olympics. He accompanied the team to the 1932 Winter Olympics in which they won the gold medal representing Canada.

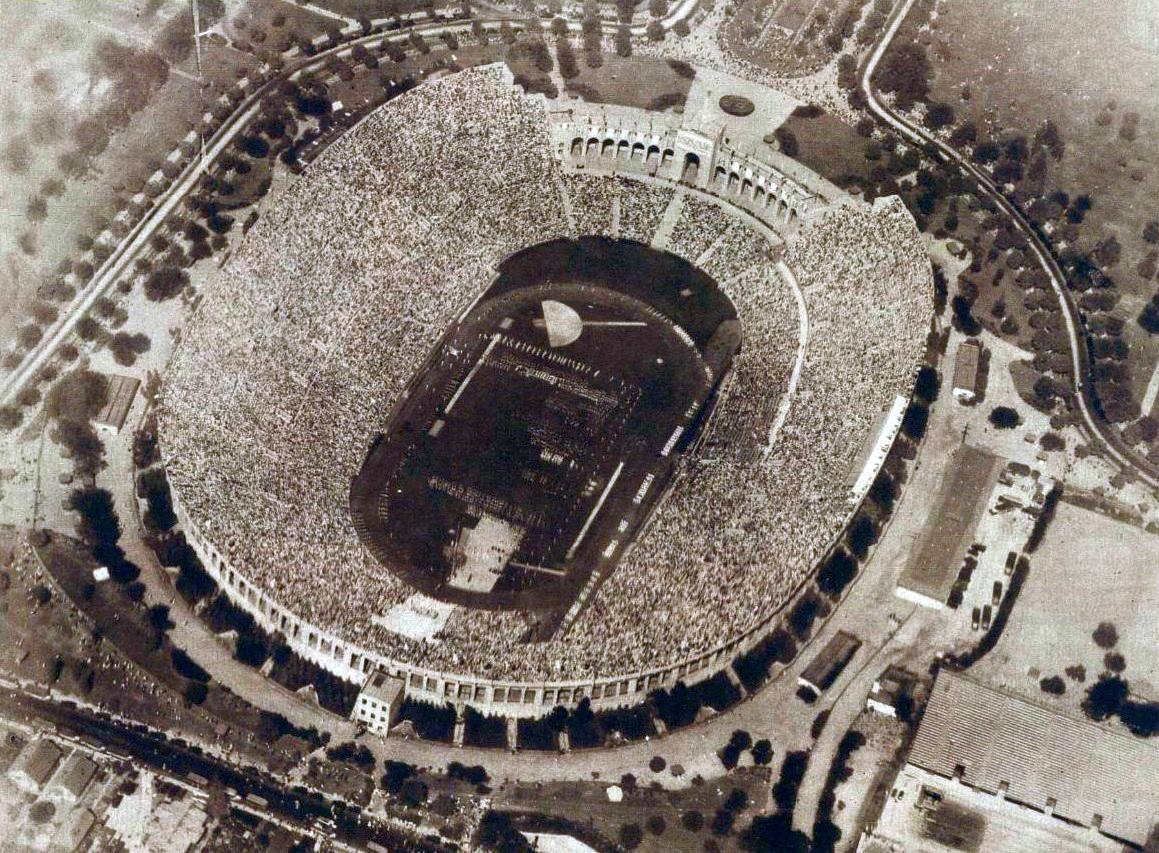
Fry attended the 1932 Summer Olympics (opening ceremonies pictured) at Los Angeles Memorial Coliseum.

Fry was named to the Canadian Olympic Committee's summer sports committee to prepare for the 1932 Summer Olympics hosted in Los Angeles, California. He was part of the delegation that went to Ottawa to lobby Edgar Nelson Rhodes, the Canadian Minister of Finance, for funds to cover travel expenses for athletes. He travelled with the Canadian delegation to Los Angeles, and self-published his own book covering Canadian achievements at the winter and summer games. His 1933 book, Canada at the tenth Olympiad, 1932 : Lake Placid, New York, Feb 4 to 13 - Los Angeles, California, July 30 to Aug. 14, was printed by the Dunnville Chronicle presses and dedicated to Canadian sportsperson Francis Nelson who died in 1932.

At the 1932 general meeting of the AAU of C, delegates discussed whether professionals in one sport could play as an amateur in another sport. The association upheld current ban against it, but agreed to further study as to how it relates to the Olympic Games and international sporting organizations. Fry called for maintaining the ideals of amateur sport and said, "it was a question of implanting proper ideals in the young generation", and "to play the game for the game's sake".

In February 1933, Fry was named again as chairman of registration committee, and as a member-at-large on the executive committee. He was elected vice-president of the AAU of C in March 1933, via mail-in vote of the executive. He recommended suspension of the Alberta branch due to breaking AAU of C principles, when five active "class A" professionals were reinstated as amateurs. He and fellow executives met with members of the Alberta branch regarding not waiting long enough to reinstate former professionals as amateurs. They agreed that a proposal would be submitted for the next AAU of C general meeting to reinstate a "class A" professional after a two or three-month trial. The AAU of C made no suspensions, and the players in question were expected to apply for reinstatement at the general meeting.

At the AAU of C general meeting in November 1933, Fry urged for means to keep branch registrations committees in close touch with the national committee. He requested the power for national committee to be able to act when irregularities were reported. The registration committee was empowered to reinstate athletes as amateurs who had not been professionals in three years. His resolution to allow professional and amateur teams to play each other in sanctioned games was defeated. Delegates to the meeting moved forward a proposal for players attending tryouts to remain as an amateur, after Fry had explained that the CAHA would not change its mind on the matter whether or not approved by the AAU of C.

In 1934, Fry was named chairman of the Canadian delegation committee to the 1934 British Empire Games. He oversaw the pregame trials in Canada, and travel arrangements to the games in London, England. AAU of C president J. Howard Crocker declined another term for health reasons, and Fry became the presumed heir since he had been appointed vice-president for the last two years.

=== President ===
==== First term ====
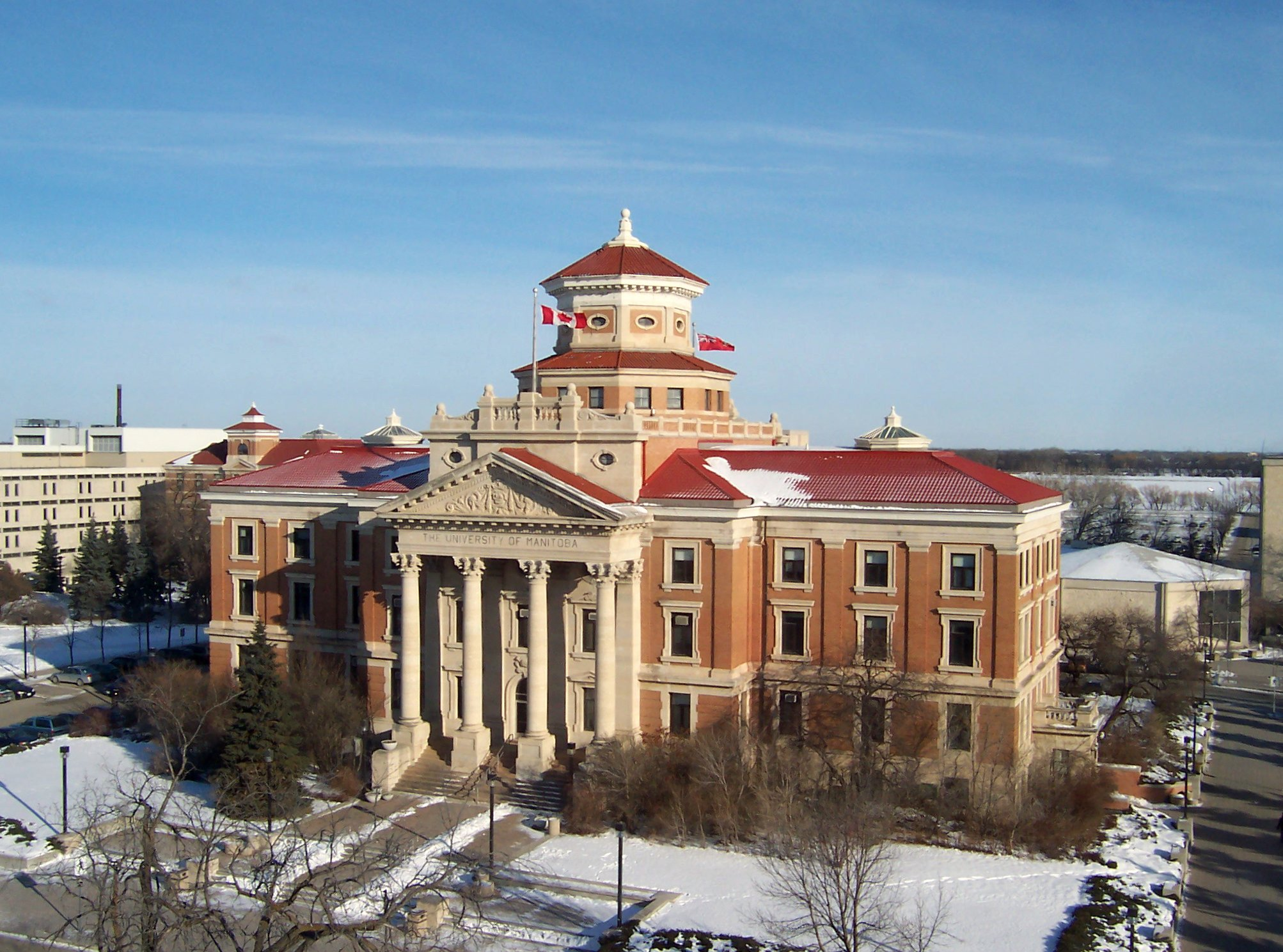
The University of Manitoba (administration building pictured) appealed to Fry to allow amateur athletes to be released to school control while enrolled as students.

Fry was acclaimed as president of the AAU of C on November 18, 1934. He took over the reins at a time when The Canadian Press reported the AAU of C was losing direct control of amateur sport, since the Canadian Track and Field Association was no longer under its direct control. The Winnipeg Free Press stated that the AAU of C was "on the verge of becoming a registration only organization". The AAU of C set up a committee to oversee amateur boxing and amateur wrestling which were still under its control, and decided to reduce its expenses by sending a smaller delegation of Canada's best chances to win medals at the upcoming Olympic Games. Fry also named himself chairman of the amateur reinstatement committee. The AAU of C recommended to its branches to spend a portion of registration fees to promote and increase team sports.

In December 1934, the University of Manitoba appealed to Fry and the AAU of C regarding a decision by the Manitoba Amateur Hockey Association (MAHA) which did not require university students be released from a private club team to play for the school team. Fry agreed with the university, stating that students are under the jurisdiction of the school unless released by the school to play for a club team. He also stated that AAU of C rulings should be respected by affiliated organizations, such as the MAHA.

In January 1935, Fry warned Canadian amateur sports bodies to beware of persons looking to profit from sport. He reminded everyone that the AAU of C was there for sport's sake and for the youth, whereas professional leagues were antagonistic and would stop at nothing to make a profit. He cautioned sports bodies of being too accommodating towards professional requests, and cautioned AAU of C branches against misinterpreting rules for their own benefit to register athletes.

Fry sought a better working arrangement with the United States' Amateur Athletic Union to track the movement of athletes across the border. He later upheld a decision by the OHA which prevented players who went to the United States from returning to competition in Ontario. At the 1935 CAHA general meeting, he supported a by James T. Sutherland to establish more cooperation with professional teams, and speak out against the continuous raiding of amateur team rosters midseason.

Fry reversed his stand in 1932, and now felt it was okay for professionals in one sport to be registered as an amateur in another sport. Delegates to the 1935 general meeting of the AAU of C voted against allowing any mixing of amateur and professionals. The same meeting saw Fry allow the AAU of C's advisory committee on the Women's Amateur Athletic Federation to investigate cancelling an affiliation with the federation due to internal problems within the women's group.

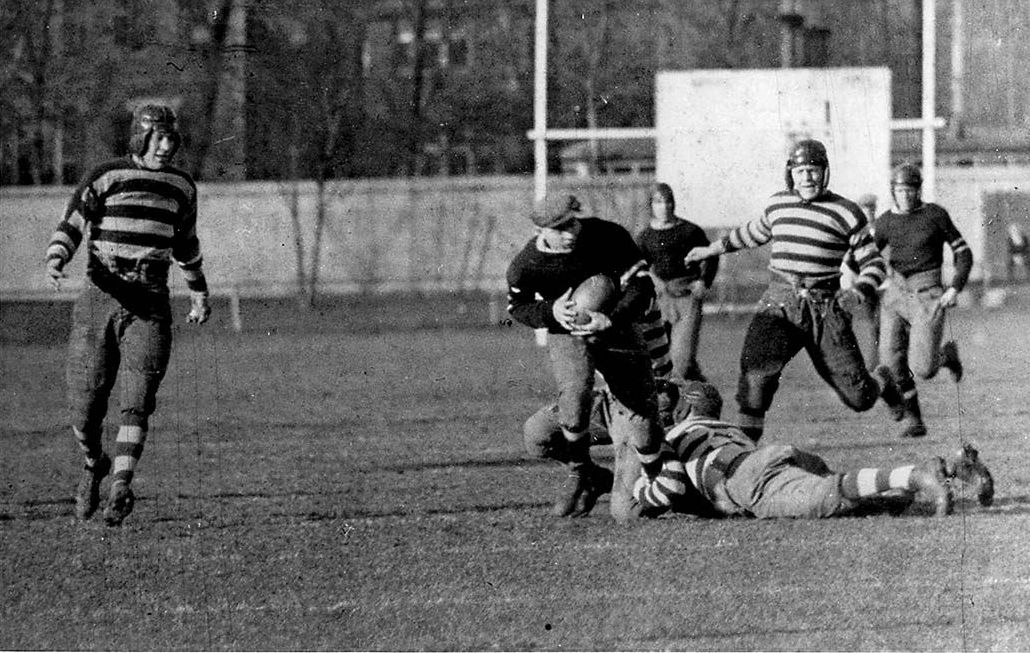
Fry ruled the Ottawa Rough Riders used an illegal player in a 1935 match versus the Toronto Argonauts (1924 Ottawa vs. Toronto match pictured) which led to nine suspensions.

On November 19, 1935, Toronto's The Mail and Empire accused the Ottawa Rough Riders of using an illegal player in a recent match against the Toronto Argonauts. Editor Edwin Allen stated that the player "Roy Berry" was an alias for Bohn Hilliard, a Texas Longhorns footballer who had played semi-professional baseball. The Ottawa branch of the AAU of C took a strict view of amateurism, and called for the suspension of all players in the Interprovincial Rugby Football Union (IRFU) who played against Hilliard, which would also prevent any IRFU team from playing for the 23rd Grey Cup. A day later, Fry stated the Ottawa branch had no authority to suspend IRFU players, but cautioned playing against Ottawa until the issue was rectified. On November 22, 1935, Fry suspended the entire Ottawa team citing proof of an illegal player, but lifted the suspensions a day later when empowered by the AAU of C executive to deal with future developments from this as he saw fit. In February 1936, Fry announced the suspension of nine members of the Ottawa team from amateur sport.

==== Second term ====
Fry was re-elected president of the AAU of C on November 23, 1935, at the general meeting. At the same time, the AAU of C adopted resolutions to ask its sports bodies to investigate and eliminate hypocrisy and dishonesty in the pursuit of profits. The union imposed a one-month delay for players transferring to Canada before a registration card would be issued, to give time to investigate a player's background and amateur eligibility. Fry had proposed to declining registration to players who had not been out of professional sports in the last three years, but the union rejected the idea. He later appointed Jack W. Hamilton as chairman of the AAU of C registration committee, which The Canadian Press reported was the most important committee within the AAU of C.

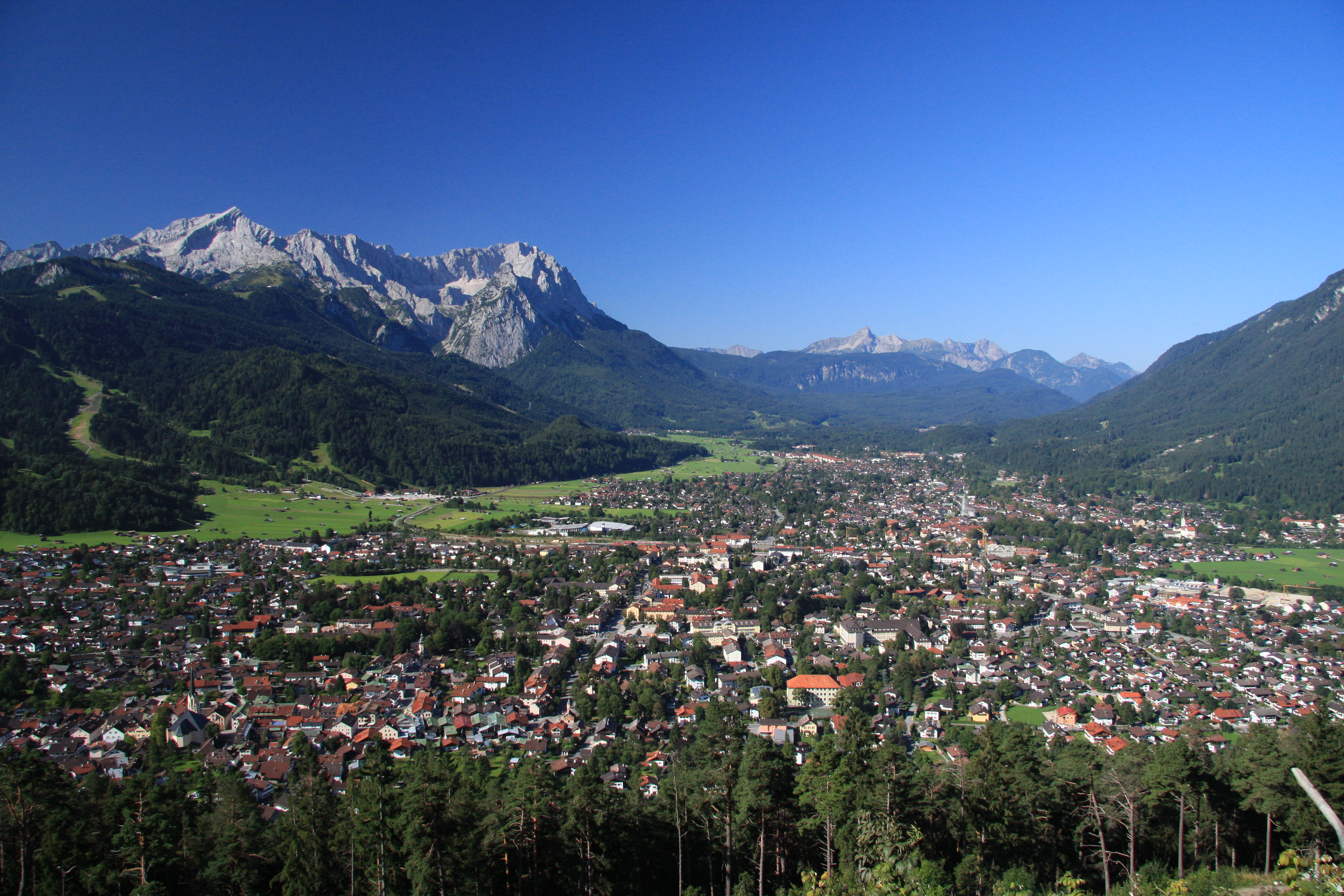
Fry attended the 1936 Winter Olympics hosted by Germany in Garmisch-Partenkirchen (pictured).

The AAU of C had yet to decide by November 1935, which team would represent Canada in ice hockey at the 1936 Winter Olympics, since the Halifax Wolverines who were the most recent 1935 Allan Cup champions had disbanded. Fry stated attempts were made to bring the Wolverines team back together for the Olympics, but its players had gone separate ways for personal and financial reasons. In December 1935, he announced the Port Arthur Bearcats who were runners up in the 1935 Allan Cup, as "the logical choice" to represent Canada. In January 1936, four members of the Wolverines were invited to play with Port Arthur at the Olympics, but declined when travel expenses were not covered for their families. Fry defended the decision by CAHA president E. A. Gilroy and the AAU of C, stating that it was not their responsibility to cover expenses beyond the players. Canada's dominance at the Olympic hockey tournament ended in 1936, when the Great Britain men's national ice hockey team which included British-Canadian dual citizens captured the gold medal over Canada who won silver.

In the wake of Canada not winning the Olympic gold medal, the CAHA pushed for changes and proposed a new definition of amateur at the April 1936 general meeting of the CAHA, which were contrary to existing AAU of C principles. The new definition mentioned four points including; payments allowed for work time lost while playing games, players are allowed to make money as a hockey player but not have a second job, professional and amateur teams could play one another in games sanctioned by the CAHA, and professionals in another sport could be amateurs in hockey. The Winnipeg Tribune speculated that support would be strong for the measures which could cut ties with the AAU of C, and the "old guard" of amateurism would lose. Fry was in attendance at the meeting, and cautioned delegates that the decision was "the most important matter ever to come before an amateur body in Canada". He further stated, "It would be a sorry day for the AAU of C should it split with its strongest supporter, the CAHA. As a former CAHA president, he sympathized with the resolution, but did not give approval. Fry was reported to have agreed with the first three points, but disagreed with professionals in one sport being amateurs in hockey. Journalist W. G. Allen noted that Fry had changed his mind again when it came to professionals in one sport being amateurs in another.

In May 1936, Fry stated in a letter to the new CAHA president Cecil Duncan, that the AAU of C would not entertain proposals to change the definition of amateur. Fry went on to say that changing the definition of amateur would sever ties with the AAU of C, and leave the CAHA not in good standing with the Ligue Internationale de Hockey sur Glace (LIHG), meaning that Canada could not play in the Olympics, World Championships, and go on exhibition tours. Duncan was critical of Fry for publishing quotes from the letter in the Dunnville Chronicle, before the letter was received. CAHA first vice-president W. G. Hardy asserted that Fry broke a promise to conduct a mail-in vote of AAU of C to decide on the matter, and consider updating the antiquated definition of amateur at the next AAU of C general meeting. CAHA second vice-president George Dudley referred to Fry as "Somersault Bill", due to the changing stand on the vote. In defending the AAU of C definition of amateur, journalist Ralph Allen compared Fry to a captain sinking with his ship. IOC president Avery Brundage defended Fry and the "old guard" position on amateurism, and eligibility for the Olympics.

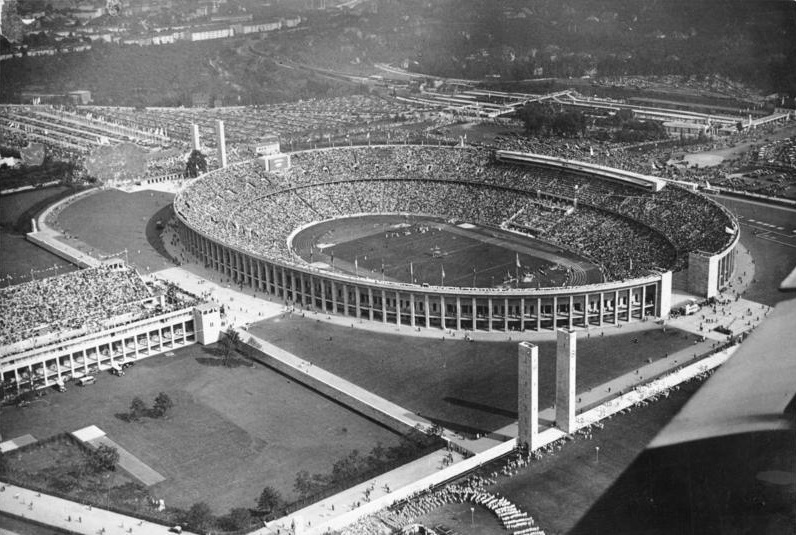
Fry attended the 1936 Summer Olympics in Germany (Competition at Berlin's Olympic Stadium pictured).

Fry travelled with the Canadian delegation to 1936 Summer Olympics hosted in Berlin, and self-published a second book on Canadian achievements. His 1936 book, Canada at eleventh Olympiad 1936 in Germany : Garmisch-Partenkirchen, February 6 to 13, Berlin, August 1 to 16, was printed by the Dunnville Chronicle presses and subtitled an official report of the Canadian Olympic Committee. He wrote that Canadians did very well at the 1936 Olympic games despite having one-tenth of the population of other countries. He opined that the length of the Canadian winter negatively affected summer training, and that Canadian athletes were underfunded compared to other countries.

In October 1936, Fry called for AAU of C branches to attend the upcoming general meeting in November, and uphold "the continued safeguarding" of amateur principles. The statement was made after the British Columbia branch sponsored a change to the amateur definition in the Canadian Lacrosse Association and the Canadian Amateur Basketball Association (CABA), and in reference to the "four points" changes by the CAHA. He stated that during his visit to the 1936 Summer Olympics, he was assured by the LIHG and the International Amateur Athletic Federation would not recognize organizations who supported professionalism in sports.

At the AAU of C general meeting in November 1936, the CABA threatened withdrawal unless grievances were resolved over registrations. Fry's motion was passed that made three years become the waiting period to be reinstated as an amateur. Delegates rejected three of the CAHA's four points, accepting only exhibition games between amateurs and professionals. The status of the alliance with the CAHA was left in limbo and unclear. The general meeting concluded on November 23, 1936, with Jack Hamilton succeeding Fry as president of the AAU of C .

=== Past-president ===
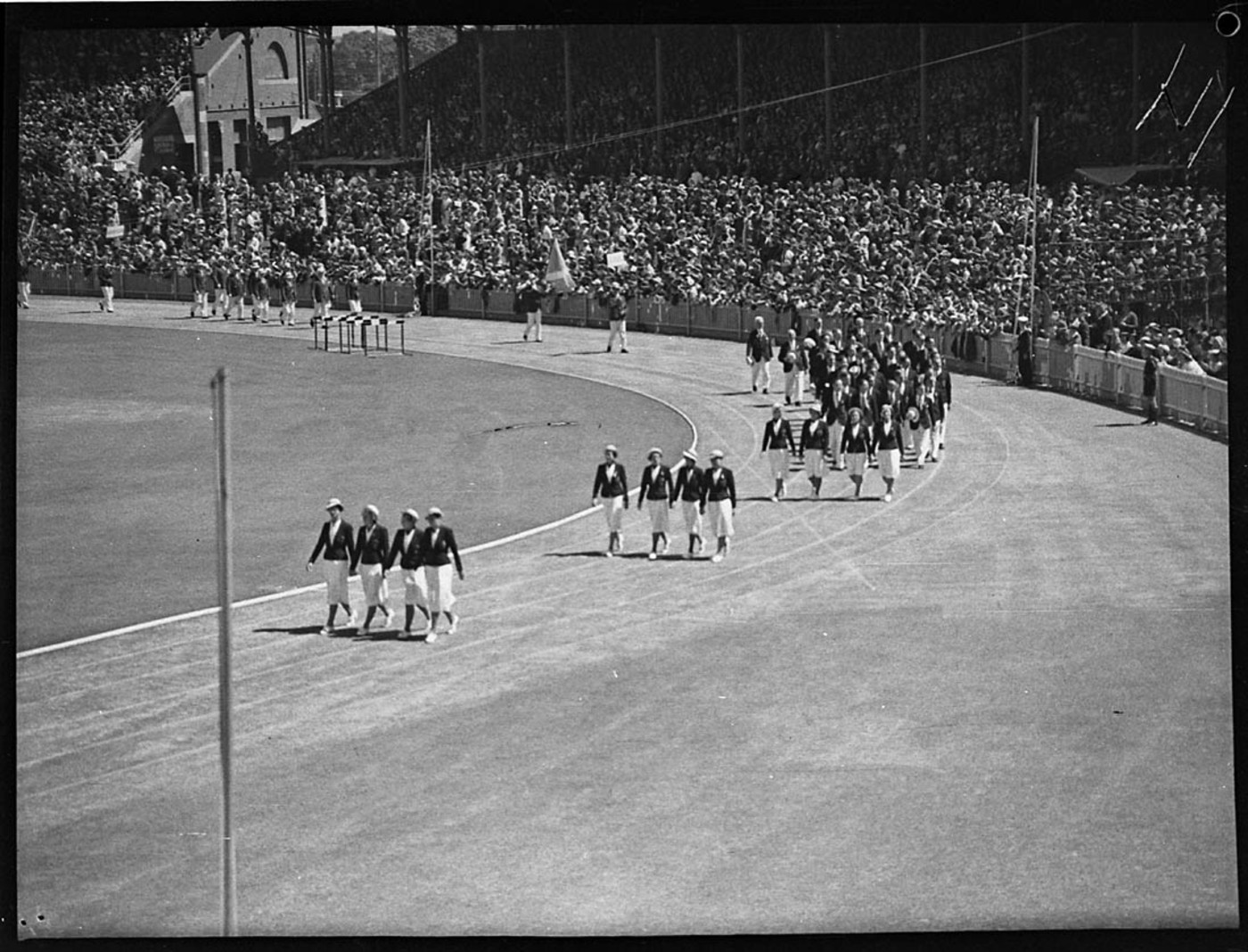
Opening ceremony of the 1938 British Empire Games at the Sydney Cricket Ground

In May 1937, Fry was named to the AAU of C committee for the Canadian delegation at the 1938 British Empire Games hosted in Sydney, Australia.

Fry remained vocal in his opposition to growing professionalism in sport. AAU of C vice-president Sydney Halter tabled a proposal in November 1937, which allowed each member sports association to accept the definition of amateurism as defined by its respective international sport governing body, in an attempt to reunite the associations under the AAU of C umbrella. Fry stated that the AAU of C should not allow payments to amateur athletes as was now allowed by the CAHA.

In November 1938, he was appointed to a commission to explore uniting the four separate branches in the AAU of C in Ontario.

Fry attended the silver jubilee of the CAHA at the Royal Alexandra Hotel in Winnipeg in April 1939, which included 11 of the 13 past presidents.

== Honours and awards ==
Fry was made a life member of the CAHA on April 6, 1932, and was made a life member of the OHA in 1934. He was appointment to Ontario Athletic Commission in 1937, by Mitchell Hepburn, the Premier of Ontario. His appointment to the Commission was honoured at a banquet in Toronto on January 10, 1938, where he was presented a silver plate by the OHA.

Fry was made an honorary president of the Haldimand County Hunters and Anglers Association, and the Hamilton Old Boys Football Association. He also had honorary membership bestowed upon him by the Royal Hamilton Yacht Club, the Dunnville Kinsmen Club, the officer's mess of the Dufferin-Haldimand Rifles of Canada, and the officer's mess of the No.6 Service Flying Training School.

== Personal life ==
Fry met and married his wife Pearl Campbell while in Ingersoll for work. He and his wife had one son and three daughters. The couple maintained a residence in Dunnville, and a summer cottage on the Lake Erie shore. He was a member of both the Dunnville Golf and Country Club and the lawn bowling club. He called Hamilton, Ontario his adopted city, and frequently travelled there to attend home games for the Hamilton Tigers football club.

== Death and legacy ==
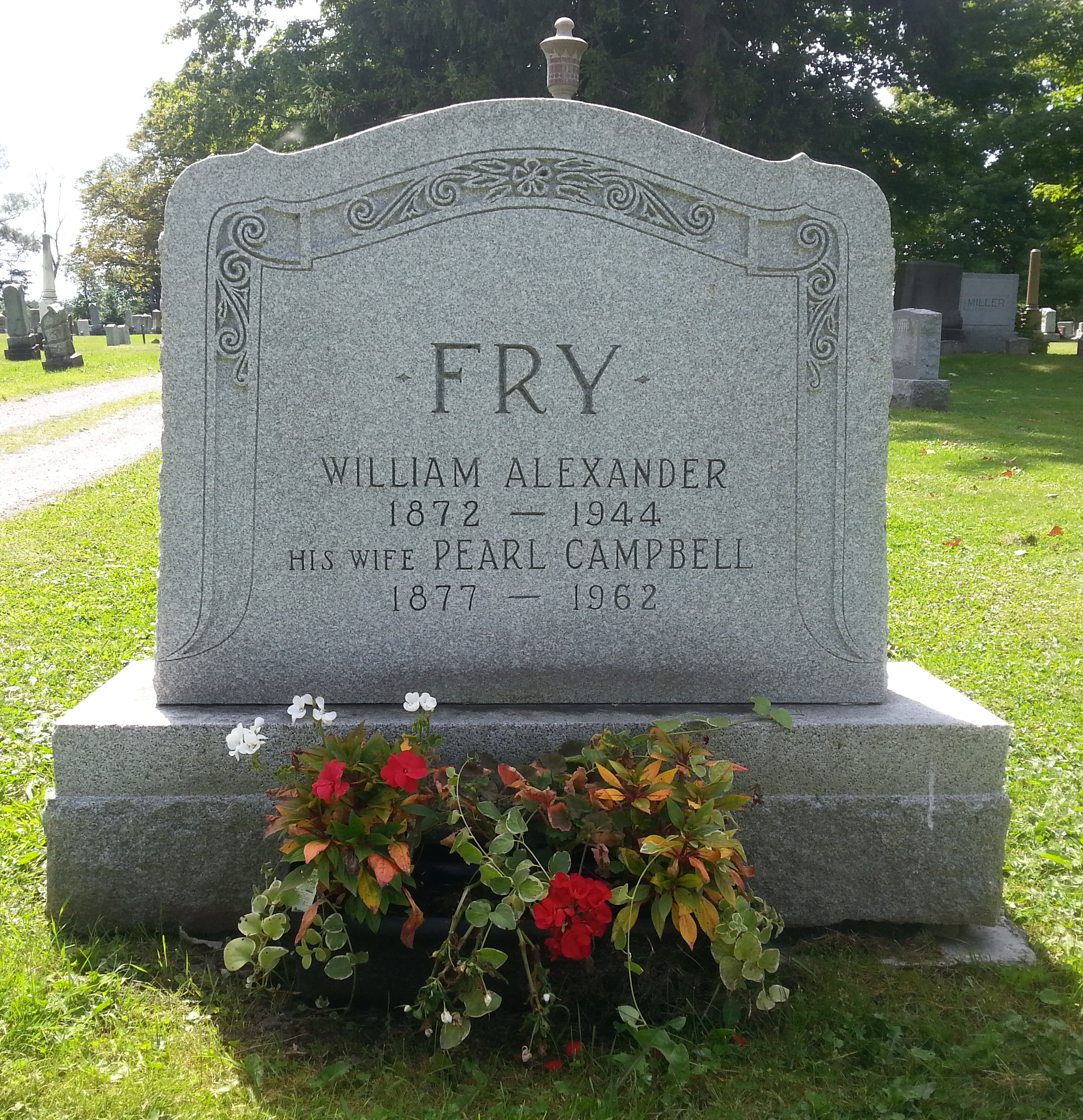
Fry's grave stone

Fry died at the Hamilton General Hospital, on Friday, April 21, 1944. He was interred at Riverside Cemetery in Dunnville. The Dunnville Chronicle and the Welland Tribune reported that Fry was well known throughout the Niagara Peninsula, and that his funeral was well-attended by members of the sports associations with which he served. He was remembered by journalist and former Olympian Bobbie Rosenfeld as a man who fought for true amateurism in sport, in the face of growing professionalism.

His son, William C. Fry, took charge of the Dunnville Chronicle in 1944. In 1961, the business was purchased by County Newspapers Limited, becoming part of the Thomson Newspapers chain. The paper later became part of Sun Media, who published the paper until closing operations due to cost-cutting measures. The final issue of the Dunnville Chronicle was issued on November 28, 2012; 116 years after its founding by Fry.

== Bibliography ==
- Wong, John Chi-Kit (2009). Coast to Coast: Hockey in Canada to the Second World War. Canada: University of Toronto Press. ISBN 978-0-8020-9532-9 – via Google Books.
- Cheryl MacDonald, ed. (1992). Grand Heritage. Dunnville, Ontario: Dunnville District Heritage Association. ISBN 1-55056-084-0.
- Young, Scott (1989). 100 Years of Dropping the Puck. Toronto, Ontario: McClelland & Stewart. ISBN 0-7710-9093-5.
- Constitution, By-laws, Regulations, History. Gloucester, Ontario: Canadian Amateur Hockey Association. May 1990.
- Sorge, Lorne (March 1984). Remember When. Vol. Seven. Dunnville, Ontario: Dunnville Chronicle.
- Sorge, Lorne (April 1988). Remember When. Vol. Eleven. Dunnville, Ontario: Dunnville Chronicle.
