= E. A. Gilroy =

Canadian ice hockey administrator (1879–1942)

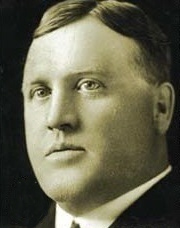
- Born: Edward Albert Gilroy; October 10, 1879; Smiths Falls, Ontario, Canada
- Died: August 8, 1942 (aged 62); Delta Beach, Manitoba, Canada
- Occupations: Court clerk; civil servant; purchasing manager; politician
- Known for: Canadian Amateur Hockey Association and Manitoba Amateur Hockey Association president
- Awards: Manitoba Hockey Hall of Fame

Edward Albert Gilroy (October 10, 1879 – August 8, 1942) was a Canadian ice hockey administrator. He served as president of the Manitoba Amateur Hockey Association (MAHA) from 1927 to 1934, and the Canadian Amateur Hockey Association (CAHA) from 1934 to 1936. In Manitoba, he sought to expand senior ice hockey and establish co-operation between teams and owners of the Winnipeg Amphitheatre on schedules and reducing travel costs. He wanted all players aged 21 and younger to remain in junior ice hockey and began to negotiate with professional teams to refrain from signing them to contracts. His seven years as leader of the MAHA was the longest tenure for a president at the time, during which he oversaw continued growth of the association and improvement of finances.

Gilroy sat on the rules committee while he was CAHA vice-president and sought to implement consistent ice hockey rules across the country. He advocated for stricter enforcement of rules for player safety and for adopting a delayed penalty rule. As president, he wanted to stop the migration of hockey players across the country as men sought to make a living by playing hockey during the Great Depression in Canada. He warned against the stacking of teams to win an Allan Cup championship and wanted to resolve the situation before selecting the Canada men's national ice hockey team to play at the 1936 Winter Olympics. His efforts were supported by most of Canada but led to multiple disagreements with the Maritime Amateur Hockey Association, where it was common knowledge that players were being paid for amateur hockey games. The relationship with the Maritimes worsened when the Halifax Wolverines were chosen to represent Canada at the Olympics but subsequently disbanded and their players removed from the national team after reports of demanding money.

Gilroy and the CAHA reached an agreement with the British Ice Hockey Association to halt the transfer of players from Canada to Great Britain until permission was granted. The Ligue Internationale de Hockey sur Glace ruled that Jimmy Foster and Alex Archer were ineligible to compete for the Great Britain men's national ice hockey team since they were suspended by the CAHA for not seeking permission to transfer internationally. On the eve of the Olympics, Gilroy allowed the two players to participate as a gesture of sportsmanship towards Great Britain, and objected to other countries portraying Canada as protesting the use of Foster and Archer. Great Britain defeated Canada by a 2–1 score, and the resulting silver medal was the first time in which Canada did not win the gold medal in ice hockey at the Olympic Games. Gilroy and the CAHA were subsequently scrutinized heavily by media and players in Canada for the failure at the Olympics. He was posthumously inducted into the builder category of the Manitoba Hockey Hall of Fame in 1987.

== Early life and business career ==
Edward Albert Gilroy was born on October 10, 1879, in Smiths Falls, Ontario. He completed his schooling in Smiths Falls. He played minor ice hockey in both Smiths Falls and Ottawa, and later became an ice hockey referee and a team executive. He also played senior ice hockey in Smiths Falls during the early 1900s.

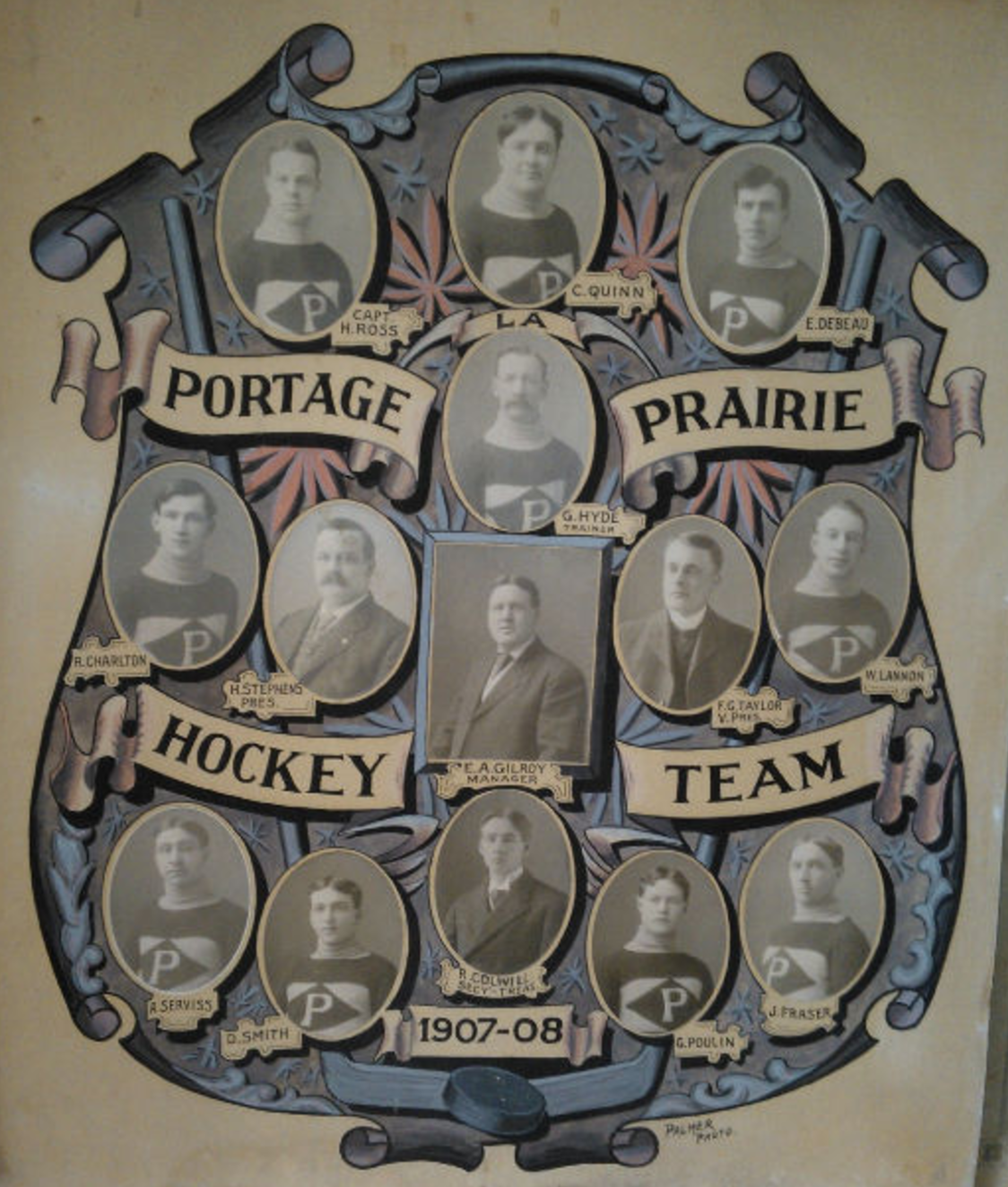
Portage la Prairie hockey team during the 1907–08 season

Gilroy first arrived in Portage la Prairie to play hockey in 1905, then spent a season playing lacrosse in Nelson, British Columbia in 1906. He returned to coach the Portage la Prairie Cities team in the Manitoba Professional Hockey League from 1906 until the team disbanded in 1909. He also served on the executive of the Manitoba & Northwestern Hockey Association at the same time. Notable players on his team included Ernie Dubeau, Jack Fraser, Newsy Lalonde, Skinner Poulin, Don Smith, and Cyclone Taylor.

In 1913, Gilroy was elected vice-president of the Senior Independent Hockey League based at the Winnipeg Amphitheatre. The league included the Winnipeg Falcons, the Winnipeg Strathcona, a team from Selkirk and a team from Portage la Prairie. He refereed games in the league, and was re-elected twice as vice-president, serving in the role until 1916. The league grew during his tenure and added the Winnipeg Monarchs who won the 1915 Allan Cup, and the Winnipeg 61st Battalion who won the 1916 Allan Cup.

Gilroy worked as a court clerk for several years, then worked in the clothing business, then became the first commissioner of the Manitoba Liquor Commission at Portage la Prairie. He was in charge of the government warehouse for the distribution of alcohol in Manitoba during prohibition in Canada. He was the purchasing manager for the Government of Manitoba for two years based in Winnipeg, then returned to Portage la Prairie operating a wholesale business from 1922 onwards.

== Manitoba Amateur Hockey Association ==
Gilroy served as president of the Portage Hockey Club from 1924 to 1927. He also served as a representative of the Manitoba Amateur Hockey Association (MAHA), and sat on the executive committee of the Portage la Prairie minor ice hockey league. As Portage Hockey Club president, he was appointed by the MAHA to committee to oversee the Manitoba Senior Hockey League. He noted the team had strong support from Portage la Prairie which allowed it to grow and prosper, and advocated to find non-hockey employment for players to keep them local instead of transferring elsewhere.

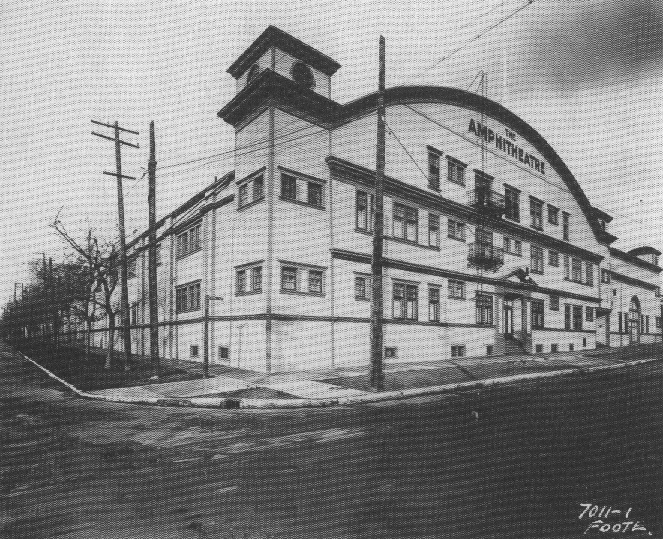
Winnipeg Amphitheatre

Gilroy was elected president of the MAHA in November 1927, to succeed newspaper executive A. E. H. Coo. A letter from Gilroy was published in the Winnipeg Free Press in December, in which he reiterated his commitment to expanding senior ice hockey in Manitoba, and restoring it to the prominence it had before rosters were depleted by professional teams. He was open to university teams participating in the Manitoba Senior Hockey League, wanted to work with owners of the Winnipeg Amphitheatre on schedules, and address concerns of attendance figures and travel costs to games outside of Winnipeg. He also sought to keep teams based in the MAHA as opposed to playing in neighbouring districts such as the Thunder Bay Amateur Hockey Association (TBAHA).

The 1927–28 season had the greatest number of hockey teams in Manitoba at the time, with the most growth in rural areas. Gilroy advocated for support of leagues based in rural areas to grow interest in the game, and since those teams could not raise funds to travel long distances to play in larger cities. He wanted to shorten the provincial playoffs system which extended play into poor ice conditions later in the season. As growth increased, he sought to educate teams and players in Manitoba that registration requirements including transfers between clubs would be enforced in the 1928–29 season, and published letters in newspapers advising of changes to consistent with new amateur regulations across Canada.

The MAHA implemented upper and lower divisions in the Manitoba Senior Hockey League for the 1929–30 season, and received more applications from teams in Winnipeg than ice availability could support. The MAHA arranged for all of the upper division teams to play in Winnipeg to reduce travel costs, and expanded the lower division with teams from Brandon, Elkhorn, Souris, and Virden. Gilroy's desire to shorten the playoffs was realized when national deadlines were imposed. The MAHA sought for all players aged 21 and younger to remain in junior hockey, but no agreement was reached with professional teams to refrain from signing players under an age limit to a contract.

The MAHA approved an application from the Kenora Thistles based in Northwestern Ontario to play in the Manitoba Junior Hockey League for the 1930–31 season. Gilroy named a committee to explore revisions to the MAHA constitution, and approved the University of Manitoba Grads to represent Canada at the 1931 Ice Hockey World Championships and a tour of Europe. The MAHA declined applications from unaffiliated teams with commercial sponsors to enter the Allan Cup and Memorial Cup playoffs, and Gilroy continued a campaign to educate teams on amateur regulations for national playoffs.

The MAHA faced a revolt from teams in the Manitoba Senior Hockey League before the 1932–33 season, when the Winnipeg Hockey Club, the Winnipeg Falcons and the Selkirk Hockey Club withdrew and formed a commercial league in protest of the Brandon Wheat City Hockey Club being admitted. Gilroy announced that any player taking part in the new commercial league would be suspended from the MAHA, and be ineligible for the Allan Cup playoffs. After a week of negotiations, an agreement was reached where the Winnipeg Monarchs and Winnipeg Hockey Club merged, and the Manitoba Senior Hockey League operated with four teams including Brandon.

When an amateur international hockey league was proposed to include teams from Winnipeg, the TBAHA and Minneapolis for the 1933–34 season, Gilroy stated it would not be approved since there was no existing international agreement for amateur leagues at the time. Gilroy retired as MAHA president after the season and A. E. H. Coo returned to the position. Gilroy's seven years was the longest tenure for an MAHA president at the time, during which he oversaw continued growth of the association and improvement of finances.

== Canadian Amateur Hockey Association ==
Gilroy was first appointed to a Canadian Amateur Hockey Association (CAHA) committee in 1928, when he was named to oversee Allan Cup playoffs for Western Canada, and was named an Allan Cup trustee along with Silver Quilty. Gilroy also sought to implement consistent ice hockey rules across the country as a member of the CAHA rules committee.

=== Vice-president ===
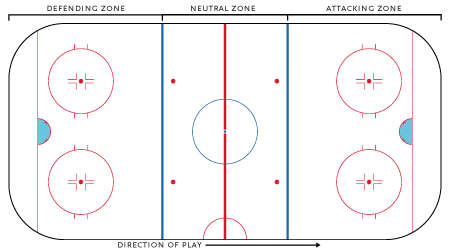
An ice hockey rink is divided into three zones by the two blue lines. (The centre red line did not exist until the 1943–44 season.)

Gilroy became the first person to be elected second vice-president of the CAHA in March 1930, when he was acclaimed to the newly created position under Jack Hamilton as president. The CAHA continued to discuss consistent application of the rules of play, and considered a proposal from the Quebec Amateur Hockey Association (QAHA) to allow the forward pass in the neutral zone of the ice hockey rink instead of it being an offside infraction. Gilroy proposed to allow body checking by players of either team in either defensive zone to meet demands of modern spectators, but the rule change was defeated.

Gilroy was re-elected second vice-president in April 1931. The CAHA confirmed complete authority of the referee over any match and interpretation of the rules of play. Gilroy travelled to Lake Placid as a representative of the CAHA, when the Winnipeg Hockey Club won the gold medal representing Canada in ice hockey at the 1932 Winter Olympics.

Gilroy was elected first vice-president of the CAHA in April 1932. The CAHA rules committee proposed multiple changes for the upcoming season, which revisited allowing the forward passes between the blue lines. In November 1932, Gilroy arranged for public meetings for the benefit of hockey players, coaches and referees, to clarify the rule change which now allowed the forward pass in the neutral zone.

Gilroy was re-elected first vice-president of the CAHA in April 1933. He oversaw arrangements for senior and junior division playoffs in Western Canada. He also sat on the CAHA rules committee which decided to implement some of the changes made by the NHL, which included allowing the forward pass in all three zones, and body checking only to the puck carrier. He also advocated for stricter enforcement of rules by referees for player safety, specifically junior ice hockey.

=== President, first term ===
Gilroy was elected president of the CAHA on April 4, 1934, to succeed Frank Greenleaf, and was the third Manitoban to become president of the CAHA following W. F. Taylor in 1914, and Toby Sexsmith in 1922. Gilroy was also a governor of the Amateur Athletic Union of Canada (AAU of C) in his role as CAHA president, and was named to the legislation committee of the AAU of C.

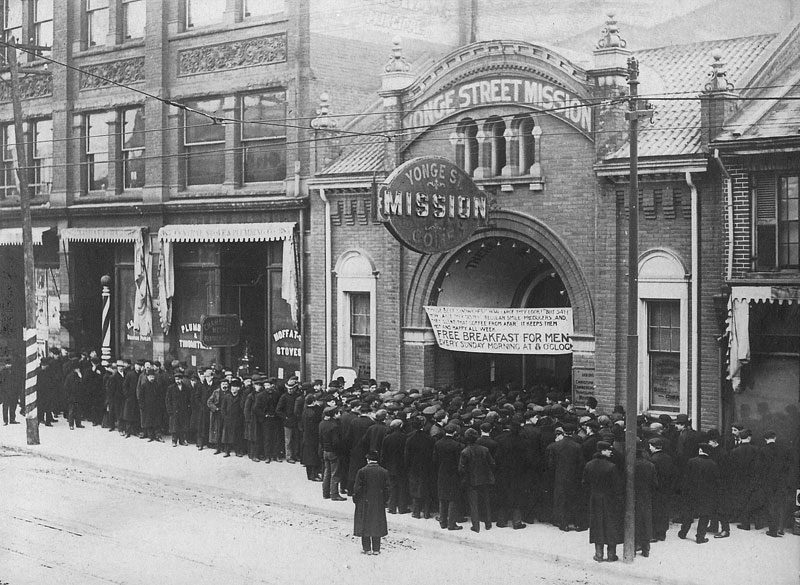
Great Depression in Canada scene of men in line for food

In May 1934, Gilroy decreed that the CAHA would halt the migration of hockey players between clubs and branches. He sought to educate on the regulations, and stated that it was unfair for clubs to stack rosters with the best players from outside of their area. The decision by players to migrate around the country looking for work was a result of the Great Depression in Canada, since more men sought to make a living by playing hockey. By sticking to the constitution and enforcing the rules, it meant many players would be ruled ineligible for hockey.

In October 1934, the CAHA gave permission for players to attend tryouts for professional teams, with the expectation that any player who did not sign a professional contract would return to amateur hockey in Canada. After those players remained in the United States on amateur teams, Gilroy suspended them from the CAHA for not obtaining a proper transfer or release.

Gilroy issued communication to all CAHA branch presidents that the registration and transfer rule would be strictly enforced, and did not want players being misled by team managers circumventing the rules. Gilroy expected little difficulty in enforcing the regulations, since he received assurance of co-operation from presidents of all CAHA branches except for the Maritimes. He warned against the stacking of teams to win a championship, and wanted the situation to be resolved this season, since the next Allan Cup champions would be the presumptive choice to become the Canada men's national ice hockey team at the 1936 Winter Olympics.

Gilroy stated that he had no intent to appoint anyone to investigate the status of amateur players within the Maritime Amateur Hockey Association, despite reports of players and teams not following proper transfer procedures. The Winnipeg Tribune reported it was common knowledge that players in the Maritimes were being paid to play, but that there was little the CAHA could do to prove it.

Gilroy asked the Maritime Amateur Hockey Association to "declare itself on the matter", with regards to operating a commercial league which was considered professionalism and not allowed under CAHA regulations or AAU of C by-laws. Gilroy declined to reconsider any transfer requests for player who had gone to the Maritimes without approval. He also declared that any team playing commercial hockey after January 2, 1935, would be suspended from the CAHA and ineligible for the Allan Cup, which included the Moncton Hawks who were the defending 1934 Allan Cup champions.

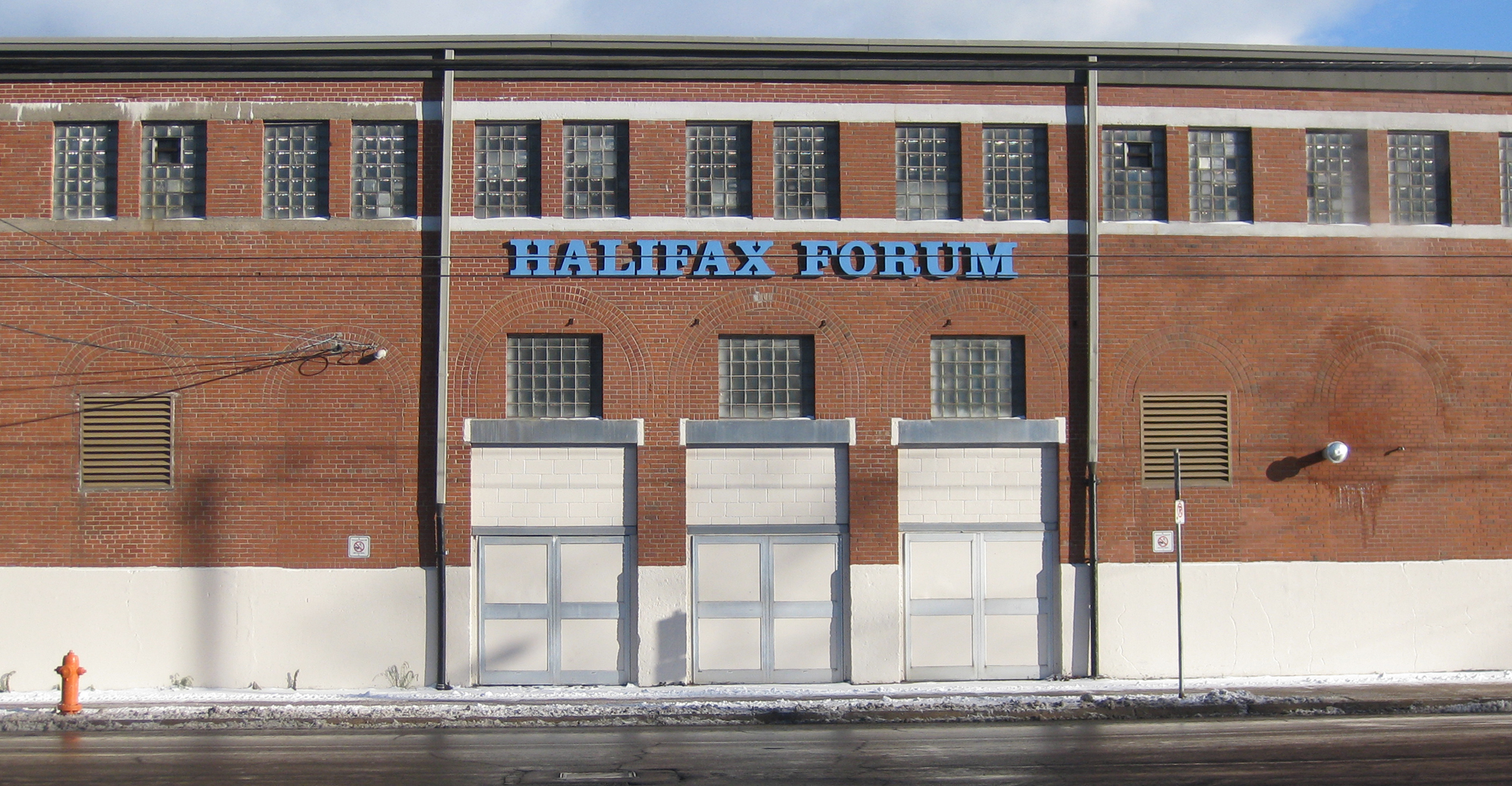
The Halifax Forum was the largest ice hockey rink in the Maritimes and home to the Wolverines.

Gilroy declared that only teams playing in an inter-city league would be eligible to compete for the Allan Cup. A three-team league was agreed upon in January, which included teams from Moncton, Halifax and Charlottetown operating under CAHA jurisdiction and excluding players who had not completed proper transfers. Gilroy warned all teams under the CAHA that the players who were ruled ineligible in the Maritimes could not play elsewhere in Canada.

The Ontario Hockey Association (OHA) also sought to operate a commercial league for the 1934–35 season, and permission was granted by the CAHA with the stipulation that such teams followed proper registration and transfers regulations and would be ineligible for the Allan Cup playoffs. Despite the experiment with commercial hockey, Gilroy predicted it had little future within the CAHA, and noted the unwillingness by commercial teams to develop younger players.

The OHA was late in deciding its junior ice hockey champion due to the use of an ineligible player. Gilroy stated the matter would be dealt with at the next CAHA general meeting to avoid a repeat, as it was unfair to teams in Western Canada to sit idle waiting to play an Eastern Canada team for the 1935 Memorial Cup.

Registrations with the CAHA had increased by 13,949 players since 1925, despite the CAHA operating at a deficit of C$30,000 in the previous three seasons. The CAHA considered expanding its registration committee to include representation by all branches of the CAHA, and Gilroy cast a tie-breaking vote for further discussion by the resolution committee. He wanted to keep players under age 21 in junior hockey and was opposed to them trying-out for professional teams. He submitted a resolution to limit try-outs by age, but it was defeated. The CAHA then approved setting up a committee to improve co-operation with the National Hockey League.

=== President, second term ===
Gilroy was re-elected president of the CAHA on April 13, 1935. He appointed a committee to discuss several issues with the AAU of C, which included the definition of amateur, the desire by CAHA branches to pay a consistent price for registration cards across Canada, and the possibility for the CAHA to issue its own registration cards. He also asked the CAHA registration committee to formally write up the common exceptions to the residence rule for junior-aged ice hockey players, or any player enlisted in the Canadian Armed Forces or the Royal Canadian Mounted Police. He reiterated that the residency rule would be strictly enforced subject to the allowed exceptions. He also advocated for adopting a delayed penalty rule when teams already had two players in the penalty box, and explained that the current situation of more than two penalties being served at once was demoralizing to the offending team, and a negative experience for spectators.

In August 1935, Gilroy warned that hockey players that participating in professional leagues without permission from the CAHA would be suspended. He specifically mentioned new leagues established in England and Scotland, but that permission for tryouts would be granted if properly requested. In September 1935, the CAHA and the British Ice Hockey Association (BIHA) agreed to halt the migration of players from Canada to Great Britain until the amateur status of each player was investigated and that permission was granted to transfer.

==== National team selection ====
The Allan Cup was the championship trophy for amateur senior ice hockey in Canada.

At the general meeting in 1935, the CAHA approved expenses to cover travel and equipment to send a team to Germany to represent Canada in ice hockey at the 1936 Winter Olympics. The CAHA reserved the right to choose the best senior team within Canada, and strengthen it with additional players from other teams in Canada up to a maximum of 12 players according to Olympic rules. In July 1935, the Halifax Wolverines were chosen to represent Canada. Gilroy denied a report in The Gazette that the CAHA would stage a series in Montreal to determine the national representative.

In November 1935, reports circulated in The Canadian Press that the Halifax Wolverines may not be able to go to the Olympics, and Gilroy expected that the 1935 Allan Cup finalists would be invited instead. He stated the final decision would be made later in the month at the AAU of C annual meeting in Halifax. The Halifax Wolverines subsequently disbanded before the 1935–36 season.

Gilroy announced that the Canadian representative would be the Port Arthur Bearcats who promptly accepted. They had lost only one player from the previous season and were given the possibility of adding up to four players from the Wolverines. Gilroy said efforts made to reassemble the Halifax Wolverines were unsuccessful, and reiterated that the decision to send the Bearcats was final. He elaborated that if the CAHA had considered the Montreal Royals team, they would also have had to consider the other semi-finalists from North Battleford.

On January 7, 1936, the four members of the Halifax Wolverines that had been added to the national team, were removed after an emergency meeting in Toronto to deal with reports of them demanding money to take care of their families while they were overseas at the Olympics. Gilroy stated that the CAHA would not give preferential treatment to any player on the team, and denied that nothing beyond travel expenses were offered to the players in order to meet amateur eligibility requirements for the Olympic Games. The next day, Walter Kitchen, Hugh Farquharson, Dinty Moore and James Haggarty were added to the national team.

According to CAHA secretary Fred Marples, the Halifax Wolverines players approached the Port Arthur Bearcats manager about taking care of their families while overseas, and the manager in turn relayed the question to Gilroy who stated he would deal with it upon arriving in Port Arthur on route to Halifax. The four players felt they were unjustly removed from the team, denied that they had asked for money, and stated that Gilroy had approached them first on the train from Port Arthur to Toronto and suggested they appeal for money from the Government of Nova Scotia.

The Maritime Amateur Hockey Association requested an official explanation of the dismissals from Gilroy and AAU of C president W. A. Fry, with suspensions forthcoming if the allegations were proven true. Gilroy stated no suspension was issued against the players at the time, but the Maritime Amateur Hockey Association called his explanation unsatisfactory that the players had requested money for their families while overseas. Gilroy sailed to Europe on January 18 aboard the RMS Duchess of Atholl along with the members of the Canadian national hockey team.

==== 1936 Winter Olympics ====
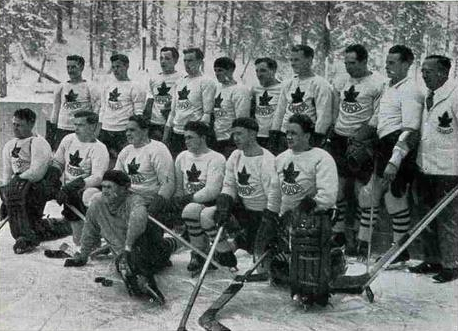
Canada men's national ice hockey team at the 1936 Winter Olympics

The Ligue Internationale de Hockey sur Glace (LIHG) which oversaw ice hockey at the Olympics, met before the games started and ruled that Jimmy Foster and Alex Archer were ineligible to compete for the Great Britain men's national ice hockey team since the players were under suspension by the CAHA for not seeking permission to transfer internationally. Great Britain's manager Bunny Ahearne contested that international rules stated a player could leave a country without seeking permission, and the CAHA suspensions should not apply.

Gilroy noted that Canada had lodged a complaint with the LIHG in September 1935, regarding the Canadians who went to play abroad without permission of the CAHA. He found it unfortunate that the question of eligibility was raised on the eve of the Olympics, since the LIHG had not held a meeting until then. He denied making a last-minute protest for fear of Canada losing to Great Britain. Gilroy also denied that Canada had agreed to lift the ban on the two players, stating that all players who had not received international transfers were still suspended. He chose not to object on the eve of the Olympics to the two players participating as a gesture of sportsmanship towards Great Britain.

Before the second round of games began, other participating hockey nations threatened to protest the victories by Great Britain due to the use of CAHA players. The Winnipeg Tribune reported that three LIHG delegates had approached Gilroy to become president and called for an emergency meeting of the LIHG. On February 10, Gilroy was quoted as saying that, "hockey in Great Britain, as conducted by the British Ice Hockey Association, is a racket". He felt that it was unsportsmanlike for Great Britain to import as many Canadian players as it did to its domestic league. He also felt that LIHG president Paul Loicq had put Canada "on the spot" by not making a decision, and objected to Canada being portrayed as in protest. Gilroy also stated, "Canada is willing to play any team here. If we can't produce a team good enough to win the Olympics, we should be ashamed, since Canada is the birthplace of hockey". The next day, Great Britain defeated Canada by a 2–1 score. Gilroy stated he had no complaint over the inclusion of Foster and Archer the game and felt Canada lost due to "tough breaks".

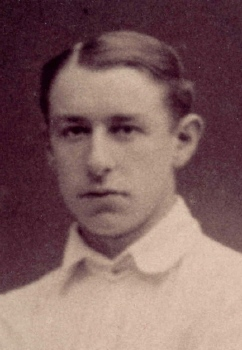
Paul Loicq, LIHG president

Before the final round began, Canada threatened to withdraw from Olympic hockey when it learned that the playoffs format would carry over the loss to Great Britain past the second round-robin series, since the tournament format stated that teams did not have to play one another more than once. Canada was faced with going into the final round of four versus the United States, Czechoslovakia and Great Britain national teams, and was only able to play two games with a loss against them. Gilroy was unaware of the playoff format in advance of the Olympics, and took objection to the sportsmanship of Canadian officials being questioned, after a special meeting decided not to alter the format. Gilroy was criticized by Canadian politician Tommy Church for fostering ill will against Canada due to the February 10 comments. Church called for an investigation and for the Government of Canada to decide on whether to abandon the Olympics in favour of the British Empire Games.

Great Britain went on to capture the gold medal and Canada received the silver medal. The 1936 tournament was the first time in which Canada did not win the gold medal in ice hockey at the Olympic Games, which led to the CAHA and Gilroy being heavily scrutinized by media in Canada. In remarks after the Olympics on February 18, Gilroy insisted that the CAHA had not wished to bring up the suspended Canadian players, and that it was made an issue against his wishes and gave Canada a reputation for poor sportsmanship. He was quoted as saying that Canada was given a "raw deal" by the playoffs format used, and considered cancellation of scheduled exhibition games for the national team except for those against Germany and France who supported Canada's disagreement with the playoffs format. The next day, Gilroy denied that he said Canada was given a "raw deal", and held further remarks until he returned home to meet with the CAHA.

The Winnipeg Tribune sports editor Johnny Buss wondered if Gilroy was being made the scapegoat for the CAHA's woes at the Olympics. He admired Gilroy for his sportsmanship, but noted the choice to let Foster and Archer play did not make any friends, nor did the comment that senior amateur hockey in England was a "racket". Buss described Gilroy as outspoken but sincere in his efforts, but speculated that Gilroy's statements were made at the urging of other CAHA officers.

==== Post-Olympics reaction in Canada ====
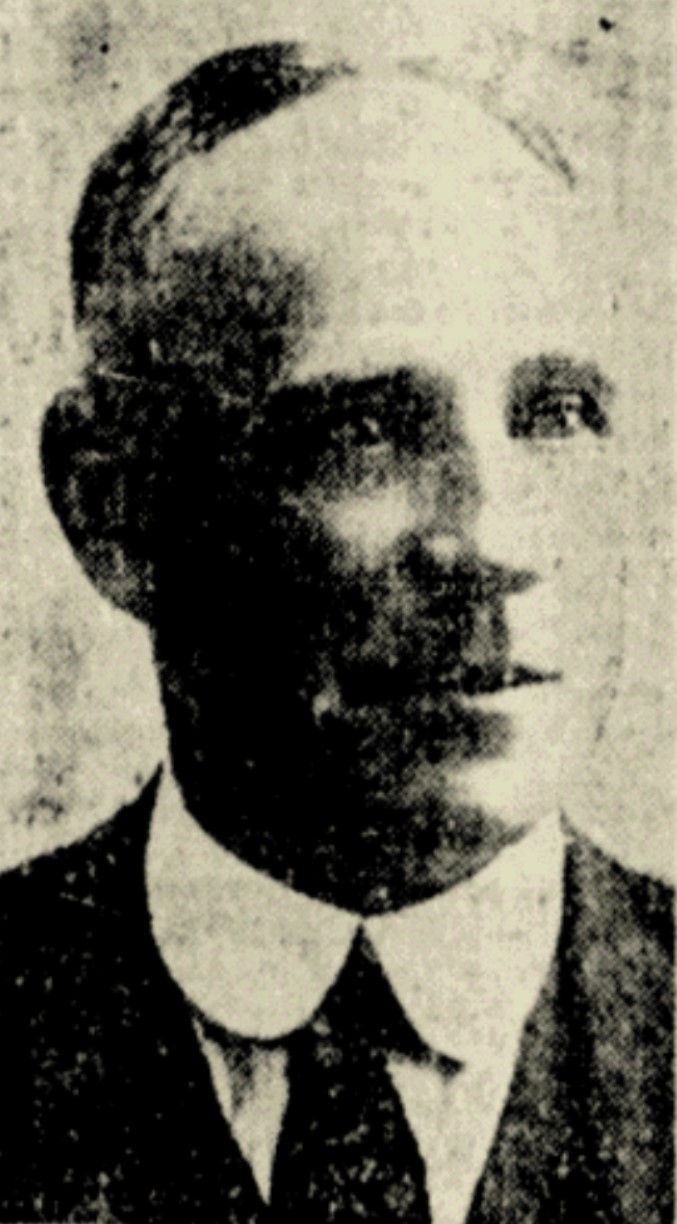
Patrick J. Mulqueen

Upon his arrival in Halifax aboard the RMS Montclare on March 2, 1936, Gilroy spoke with Canadian media who had not been in attendance at the Olympics. He reiterated that the CAHA did not protest the use of Archer and Foster by Great Britain, and voted with the majority of LIHG members to allow them to play. Gilroy felt the playoffs format was changed to Great Britain's advantage in the middle of competition by parties who stood to gain from the change. He defended the choice of the national team and declared no CAHA officers would resign due to not winning the gold medal. He also stated, "I have been misrepresented and misunderstood so many times. I am becoming hardened to it". Neither Gilroy nor Canadian Olympic Committee president Patrick J. Mulqueen elaborated on the comment that English hockey was a "racket". The Canadian Press reported the Gilroy appeared nervous in response to what Mulqueen termed "misrepresentation of his actions".

Gilroy arrived in Winnipeg the next day and was quoted as saying, "No matter how you add it up, Canada should have won the Olympic hockey championship". Canada had won seven of eight games played and had a better ratio of goals for against compared to Great Britain which won five of seven games with two draws. Gilroy said, "There is no question that the fact that the rules were changed immediately following England's victory over Canada. Loicq denied that rules to decide the standings and said that Gilroy and Mulqueen did not understand the playoffs system in place.

The Port Arthur Bearcats returned from Europe three weeks later than CAHA officials, since the team played an extended tour of exhibition games in Europe after the Olympics. The Bearcats were declined a spot in the 1936 Allan Cup playoffs because it was too late to rearrange the schedule. Gilroy upheld the decision by his vice-president and denied that a playoff berth was promised to the team.

Canadian national teams players spoke with the media in Montreal later in March, and were critical of the Canadian leadership. Kenneth Farmer stated that none of Canada's officials knew what playoff system was being used and that Gilroy and Marples "were blissfully unaware of what it was all about". Ralph St. Germain said that if Canada was a seen as poor sports, "It was largely due to the incessant blustering and bickering of our officials". OHA executive J. Percy Bond stated that Gilroy did not deserve most of the criticism. Bond stated that Gilroy should have known the playoff system in place, but that Gilroy had twice threatened to return from Germany because of the lack of co-operation from other Canadian officials.

==== 1936 CAHA general meeting ====
Gilroy told delegates at the 1936 CAHA general meeting that in September 1935, officials of the BIHA agreed that no Canadians would play in Great Britain without CAHA permission, but failed to keep the agreement. He also stated that Loicq declared the players ineligible in November 1935 but later rescinded. Gilroy felt it would be unfair to suspend Foster and Archer on the eve of the Olympics, and that Loicq should not have let the BIHA believe the players were eligible. Gilroy stated it was solely his doing to have the suspensions lifted.

The focus of the general meeting moved towards regulating players and updating amateur regulations. Gilroy appointed a committee to meet with the Amateur Athletic Union and discuss restrictions on player movements between Canada and the United States. He wanted to see an end to amateurs entering the United States under a professional bond due to immigration laws. The CAHA banned the migration of Canadian players to the United Kingdom until a new working agreement was reached, after Gilroy explained that the BIHA had made no effort to enforce an existing player transfer agreement from 1935.

W. G. Hardy and George Dudley proposed new definition of amateur including "four points" in an attempt to eliminate "shamateurism", which if approved would semi-professionalize the game. Gilroy stated that if the new definition was adopted, it would automatically sever relations with the AAU of C, and lose the privilege to participate in hockey at the Olympics.

The "four points" approved at the meeting were:

1. Hockey players may capitalize on their ability as hockey players for the purpose of obtaining legitimate employment.
2. Hockey players may accept from their clubs or employers payment for time lost, from work while competing on behalf of their clubs. They will not however, be allowed to hold "shadow" jobs under the clause.
3. Amateur hockey teams may play exhibition games against professional teams under such conditions as may be laid down by the individual branches of the CAHA.
4. Professionals in another sport will be allowed to play under the CAHA jurisdiction as amateurs.

Gilroy supported three of the changes, but was against players receiving payments from work while competing in hockey. At the conclusion general meeting, he was succeeded as CAHA president by Cecil Duncan on April 14, 1936.

== Political career ==
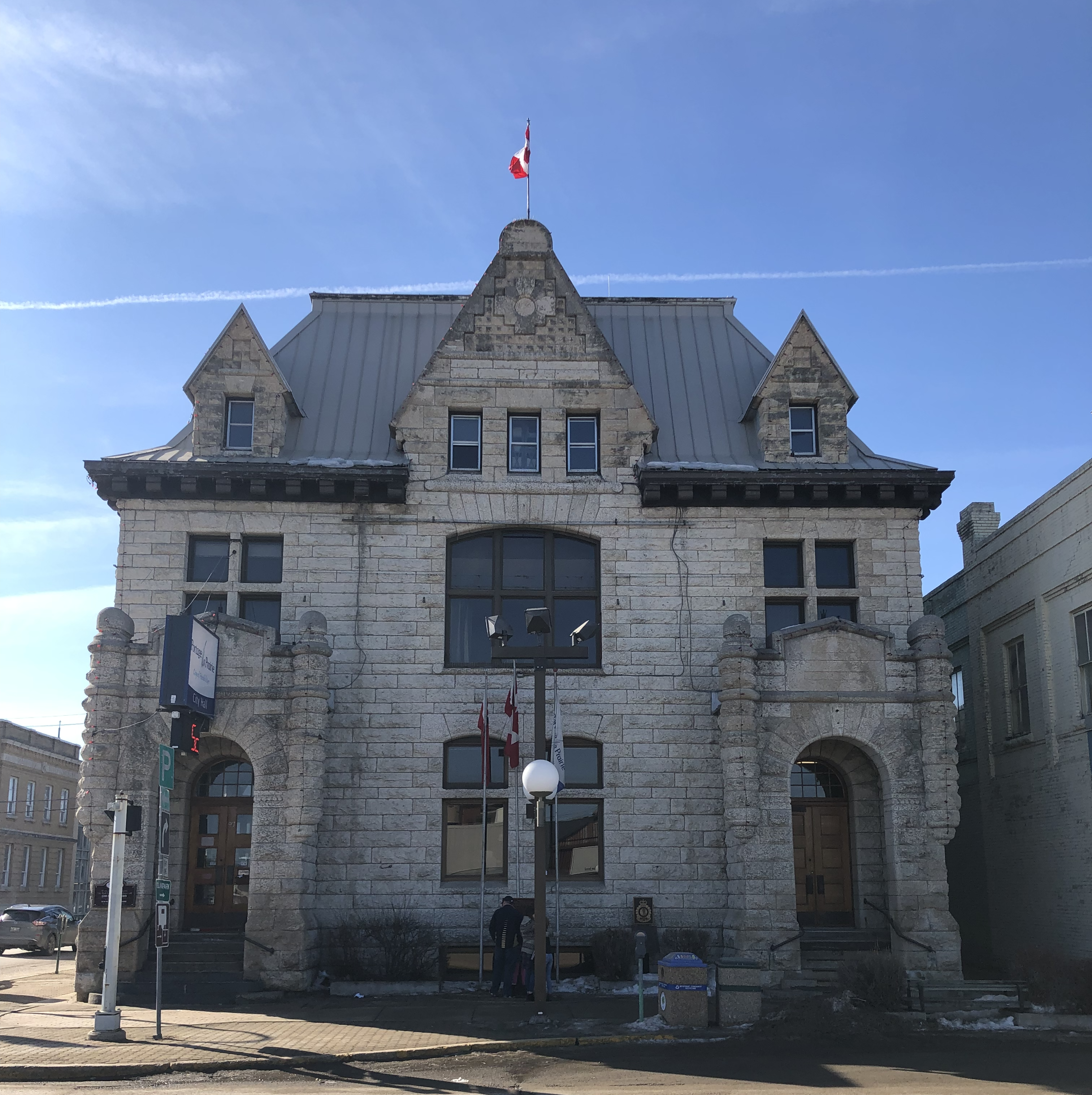
Portage la Prairie municipal building

Gilroy served as an alderman for the east ward of the Portage la Prairie municipal government for six years during the 1930s, and was an executive member of the local Board of Trade.

On October 30, Gilroy became an independent candidate in the November 1933 by-election for the Portage la Prairie electoral district in the Manitoba Legislature. He ran against Toby Sexsmith of the Progressive Conservative Party who was a former president of both the MAHA and the CAHA. The Winnipeg Free Press reported that the campaign for the seat vacated by Fawcett Taylor had few public meetings, no noticeable political issues being discussed, and appeared to be a popularity contest between Gilroy and Sexsmith. A third candidate from the Co-operative Commonwealth Federation was reported to be a long shot. Gilroy had previously been aligned as a conservative, but felt that as an independent candidate he could appeal to both liberal and conservative voters. Sexsmith won the by-election by 238 votes over Gilroy.

On June 25, Gilroy was nominated as the Liberal-Progressive Party candidate in the Portage la Prairie electoral district for the July 1936 Manitoba general election. The election was a rematch versus the incumbent Toby Sexsmith. Gilroy had since completed his terms as president of the CAHA, and the Medicine Hat News described the election as a "Battle of the Sports Moguls", compared to the Winnipeg Free Press which called it a "Battle of Hockey Moguls". Gilroy received 1279 votes and was defeated again by Sexsmith who received 1727 votes.

== Later hockey career ==
The Memorial Cup trophy

Gilroy was named to the MAHA executive in the past-president role, in October 1936. He was among the dignitaries which attended the opening of the new concrete and steel hockey rink in Portage la Prairie in January 1937. Portage la Prairie was the only Canadian city at the time to have two former CAHA presidents as residents, in Gilroy and Sexsmith, who both participated in the ceremonial first puck at the new rink.

As the past-president of the CAHA in May 1937, Gilroy was given the honour of presenting the Memorial Cup trophy to the Winnipeg Monarchs for a second time. The first was for the 1935 Memorial Cup championship and then again for the 1937 Memorial Cup championship.

Gilroy was appointed chairman of the rules committee to examine changes at the CAHA general meeting in April 1938. He submitted a motion to ban commercial teams from competing for the Memorial Cup or Allan Cup, but it was defeated without debate. He also recommended to allow strengthening of teams from within their own branch, once the team won its branch championship and advanced into the national playoffs.

Gilroy was named manager of the Portage Terriers junior hockey team in May 1938. He felt that he had assembled the best Portage team of the 1930s, in preparation for the 1938–39 season. He later became team president and a director of the Portage Rink Company.

Gilroy was a guest of the MAHA silver jubilee held in Winnipeg in October 1938, with five of the six past-presidents in attendance. The CAHA held its own silver jubilee in April 1939, at the Royal Alexandra Hotel in Winnipeg. Gilroy was a guest where eleven of the thirteen past-presidents were in attendance.

Gilroy was critical of the MAHA for allowing wholesale transfer of players between north and south divisions in the junior league in the 1939–40 season. He felt that a rink company should not be dictating to the league, and stated that the MAHA should enforce the rules strictly and have "backbone".

== Personal life and death ==
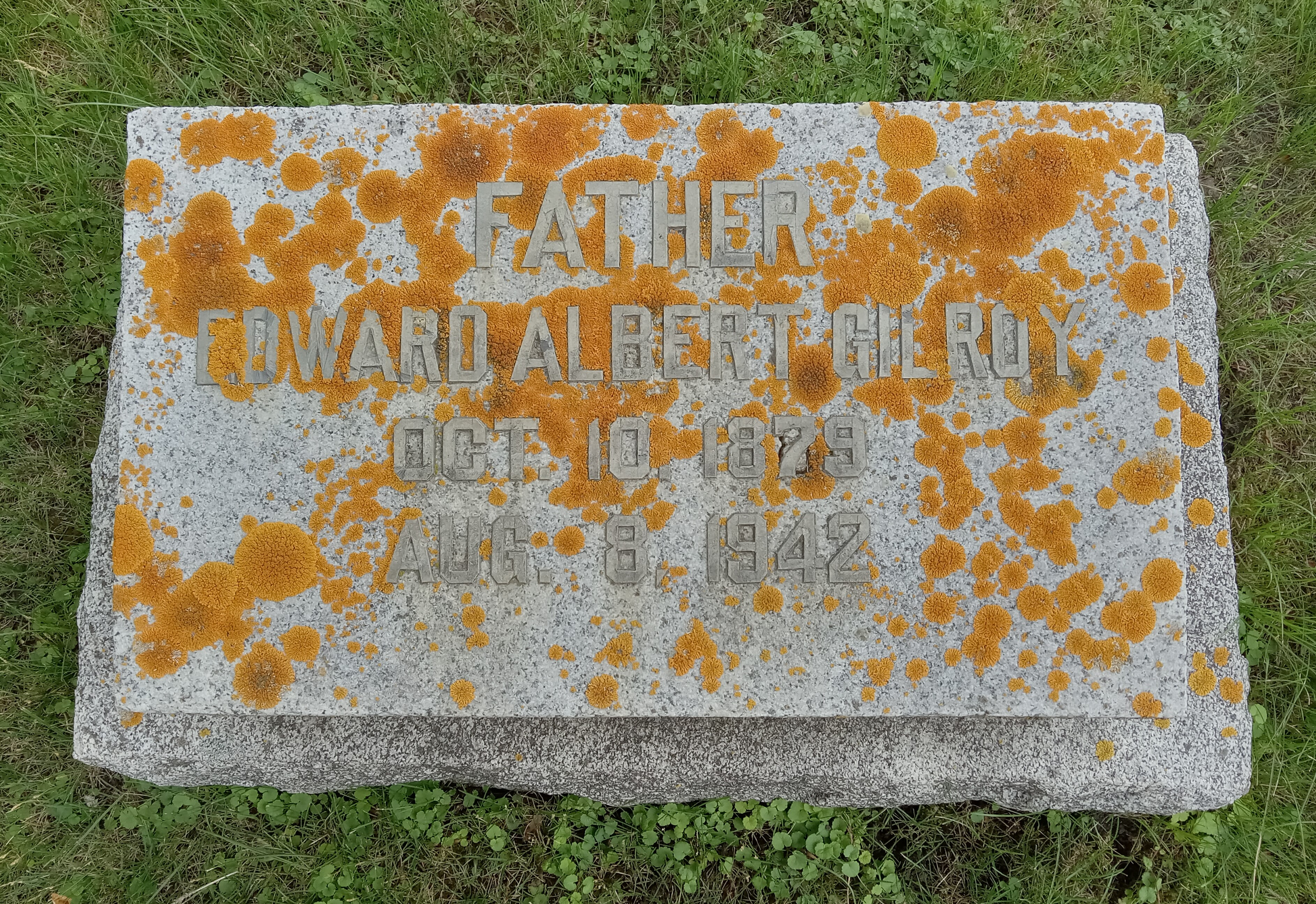
Gilroy's grave marker

Gilroy resided in Portage la Prairie from 1906 onwards, except for two years while working in Winnipeg. He maintained a summer home on the shores of Lake Manitoba, and served as president of the Delta Beach Association for 15 years. He was a recreational golfer and hunter, and a member of the Oakland Country Club near Delta Beach.

Gilroy had two sons with his wife Gertrude Gaunce, who died in January 1942. Gilroy died on August 8, 1942, at his summer home in Delta Beach due to heart problems. He was interred with his wife in Hillside Cemetery in Portage la Prairie.

== Legacy and honours ==
Gilroy was named an honorary president of the MAHA in 1937. He was also named an honorary patron of the Portage la Prairie Baseball Club.

Journalist Ralph Allen credited Gilroy with being progressive early in his presidency of the CAHA, for enforcing the rules and upholding the constitution to protect amateur hockey in Canada. Gilroy had felt it necessary to prevent regional disparities in talent due to players migrating around the country in numbers never seen before. After Gilroy's death, Frank Sargent who was the CAHA president at the time, stated that "His term of office was a very difficult one and he discharged his duties in a most able manner". Cecil Duncan described Gilroy's presidency as "transitory and troublous" for the CAHA, and International Ice Hockey Association president W. G. Hardy felt that Gilroy acted fairly and in the best interests of hockey in Canada.

In 1946, the MAHA was presented with a memorial cup to commemorate Gilroy by his son Jack. The cup became the E. A. Gilroy Memorial Trophy awarded to the Manitoba champion of the juvenile B-level division.

Gilroy was posthumously inducted into the builder category of the Manitoba Hockey Hall of Fame in 1987.
