= Umbrella (disambiguation) =

An umbrella is a canopy device designed to protect from precipitation or sunlight.

Umbrella or Umbrellas may also refer to:

== Arts, entertainment, and media ==
=== Films ===
- The Umbrellas of Cherbourg, a 1964 film by Jaques Demy
- Umbrella (film), a 2007 documentary film directed by Du Haibin
- The Umbrella (film), a 1933 British comedy film directed by Redd Davis
- Umbrella, a 1969 Indian short animated film by B. R. Shendge, winner of the National Film Award for Best Non-Feature Animation Film

=== Literature ===
- Umbrella (children's book), a 1958 Caldecott Honor picture book by Taro Yashima
- Umbrella (novel), a 2012 novel by Will Self
- Umbrella: A Pacific Tale, by Ferdinand Mount

=== Music ===
==== Groups ====
- Umbrellas (band), an indie rock band
- The Umbrellas (jazz ensemble), an Australian jazz ensemble

==== Albums ====
- Umbrellas (band), self-titled album by the Umbrellas
- Umbrella (The Innocence Mission album), 1991
- Umbrella (Shota Shimizu album), 2008

==== Songs ====
- "Umbrella" (song), a 2007 song by Rihanna featuring Jay-Z
- "Umbrella" (Metro Boomin, 21 Savage and Young Nudy song), 2022
- "Umbrella", a song by Dog's Eye View from the 1997 album Daisy
- "Umbrella", a song by Kara from the 2010 EP Lupin
- "Umbrella", a song by Nits, 1979
- "Umbrella", a song by Siouxsie and the Banshees released as the second single for the 1986 album Tinderbox
- "Umbrella", a song from Steve Angello and Sebastian Ingrosso, 2007
- "Umbrella", a song by The Baseballs, 2009
- "Umbrella", a song by The Boppers, 1981
- "Umbrella", a song by Utopia, 1980
- "Umbrella", a song by Yui from the 2007 album Can't Buy My Love

=== Other arts, entertainment, and media ===
- The Umbrella, a Canadian arts talk show television series
- Umbrella (newsletter), an American newsletter on artist's books
- Umbrella Corporation, the fictional corporation in the Resident Evil series
- Umbrella Entertainment, a company in Australia whose DVDs were distributed by Madman Entertainment
- The Umbrellas (Renoir), 1880s
- "Umbrella Umbrella", an episode of the TV series Pocoyo

== Technology ==
- Umbrella (underwater nuclear test), conducted as part of Operation Hardtack I
- Cisco Umbrella, OpenDNS rebranded as a business service

== Other uses ==
- Umbrella toxin, a bacterial polymorphic toxin
- Umbrella brand, an overarching brand
- Umbrella company, a trading vehicle for UK freelancers/contractors
- Umbrella fund, an investment term
- Umbrella insurance, liability insurance that is in excess of specified other policies and potentially primary insurance for losses not covered by the other policies
- Umbrella Movement, the Hong Kong political movement involved in the 2014 Hong Kong protests
- Umbrella organization, an association of institutions
- Umbrella term, a word that provides a superset or grouping of concepts that all fall under a single common category

== See also ==
- The Umbrellas (disambiguation)
