= 1936 Allan Cup =

Canadian senior ice hockey championship

The Allan Cup trophy

The 1936 Allan Cup the Canadian senior ice hockey championship for the 1935–36 season. The 1936 championship was the 29th time the Allan Cup had been awarded.

== Playdowns ==
In 1936 the Kimberley Dynamiters won the Allan Cup, defeating the Sudbury Falcons in the best of 3 final series 2 games to 0.

Neither of the two finalists from the 1935 Allan Cup participated in the 1936 playoffs. The champion Halifax Wolverines had since disbanded. The finalists Port Arthur Bearcats were excluded from the schedule since the team went to Germany to represent Canada in ice hockey at the 1936 Winter Olympics, then played a subsequent exhibition tour in Europe. Canadian Amateur Hockey Association president E. A. Gilroy ruled that it was too late to reconfigure the playoffs schedules when the team eventually returned from Europe.
