= The Umbrellas =

The Umbrellas may refer to:

- The Umbrellas (Christo and Jeanne-Claude), 1991 environmental artwork by Christo and Jeanne-Claude
- The Umbrellas (Renoir), 1883 painting by Pierre-Auguste Renoir
- The Umbrellas (jazz ensemble), Australian jazz band
- Umbrellas (band), American indie rock band from Oklahoma
- The Umbrellas, American indie pop band from California that released the 2024 album Fairweather Friend

== See also ==
- Umbrella (disambiguation)
- The Umbrellas of Cherbourg, a 1964 musical film
