= Maritime Amateur Hockey Association =

Canadian ice hockey governing body

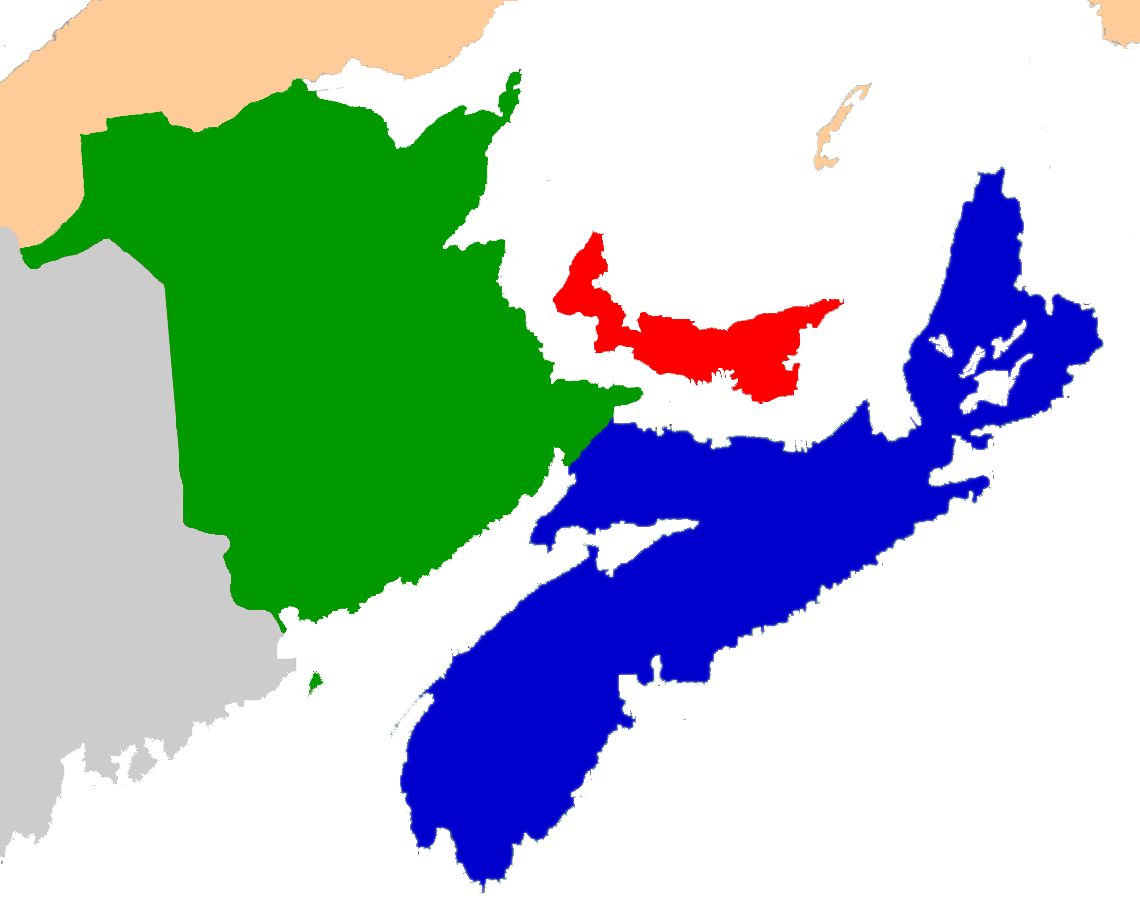
Canadian provinces in the Maritimes: New Brunswick (green), Nova Scotia (blue) and Prince Edward Island (red)

The Maritime Amateur Hockey Association (MAHA) was a governing body for amateur ice hockey in the Maritimes of Canada. It was a branch member of the Canadian Amateur Hockey Association from 1928 to 1974, with its jurisdiction including the provinces of New Brunswick, Nova Scotia and Prince Edward Island. The MAHA operated leagues for senior ice hockey which competed for the Allan Cup, and leagues for junior ice hockey which competed for the Memorial Cup. The New Brunswick Amateur Hockey Association separated from the MAHA in 1968, and the MAHA ceased to exist after the Nova Scotia Hockey Association and Prince Edward Island Hockey Association were established in 1974.

== History ==
The Maritime Amateur Hockey Association (MAHA) became a branch member of the Canadian Amateur Hockey Association (CAHA) in 1928, with its jurisdiction including the Maritimes provinces of New Brunswick, Nova Scotia and Prince Edward Island. Plans for the MAHA originated when the CAHA was founded in 1914, but took 14 years to be realized. G. P. Bolton from Sussex, New Brunswick, was one of the founders of the MAHA and served as its first president.

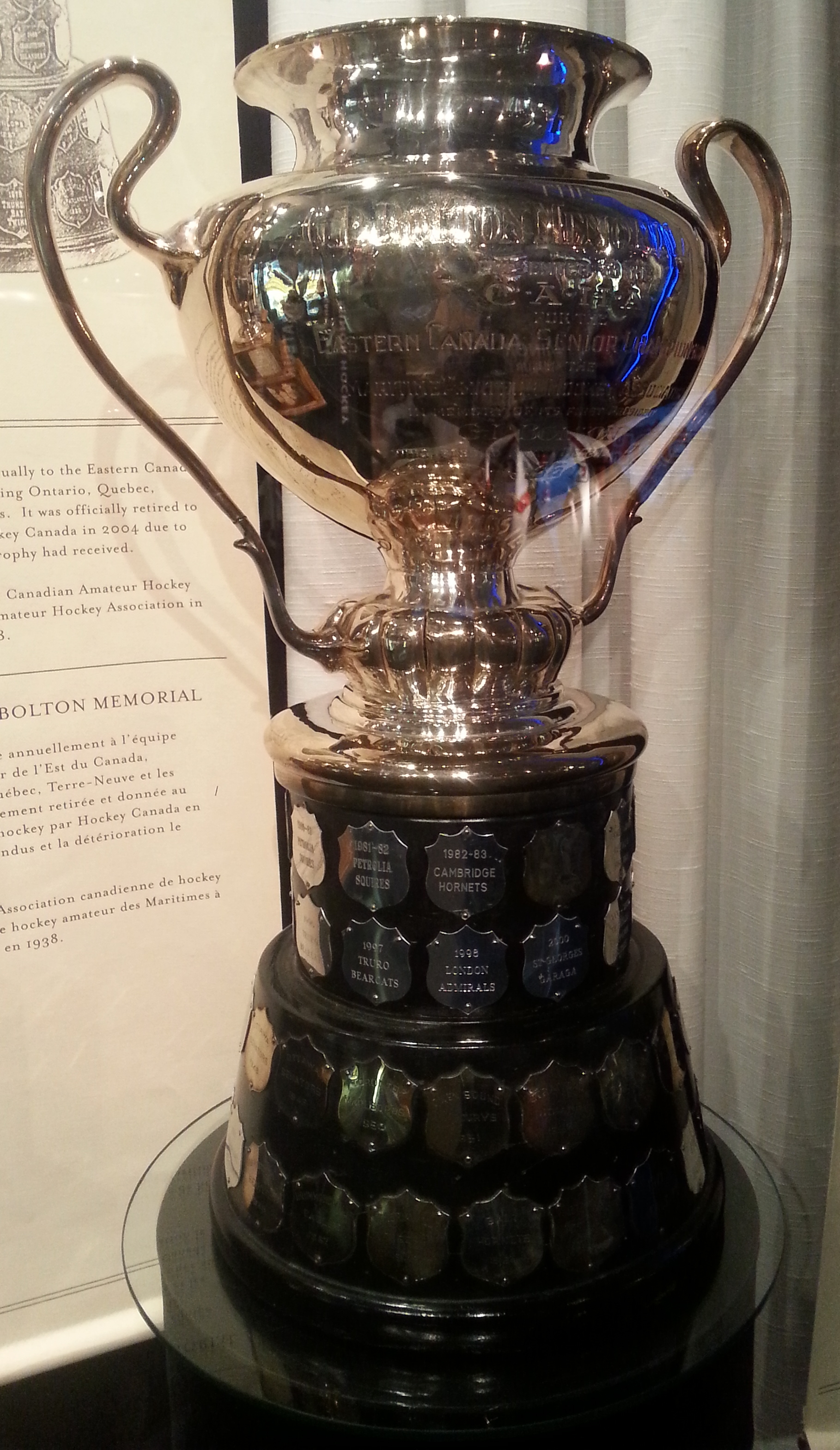
The G. P. Bolton Memorial Trophy was awarded to the champion of senior ice hockey in Eastern Canada, and was named for the first president of the MAHA.

The MAHA operated leagues for senior ice hockey which competed for the Allan Cup national championship, and leagues for junior ice hockey which competed for the Memorial Cup national championship. While no junior team based in the Maritimes won the Canadian championship during the existence of the MAHA, (Note: The Saint John Sea Dogs became the first team based in the Maritimes to win the Canadian junior championship at the 2011 Memorial Cup.) three senior teams won the Canadian championship which included the Moncton Hawks at the 1933 Allan Cup and 1934 Allan Cup, and the Halifax Wolverines at the 1935 Allan Cup.

The Maritimes saw growth in senior hockey during the Great Depression in Canada, as men sought to make a living and it was reported by The Winnipeg Tribune as common knowledge that amateurs were being paid to play in the Maritimes. In December 1934, CAHA president E. A. Gilroy asked the MAHA to make a declaration on operating a commercial league which was considered professionalism and not allowed. After a month of negotiations, the CAHA approved a senior league that excluded players suspended by the CAHA for improper transfers to the MAHA.

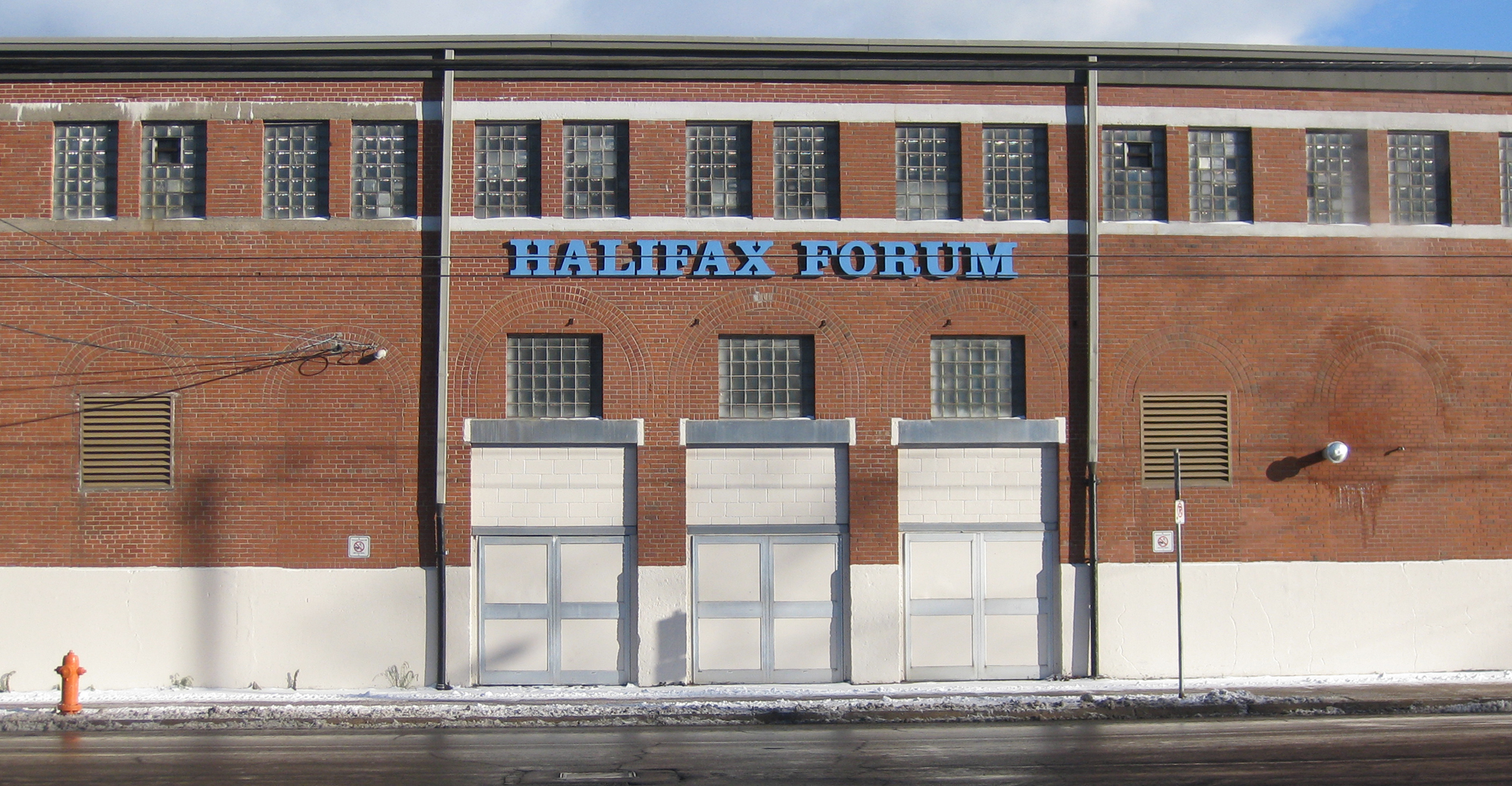
The Halifax Forum was the largest ice hockey rink in the Maritimes and home to the Halifax Wolverines.

Prior to the 1936 Winter Olympics, four members of the Halifax Wolverines that had been added to the Canada men's national ice hockey team were removed after reports of them demanding money. The MAHA called Gilroy's explanation unsatisfactory and threatened to resign as a branch of the CAHA.

Nova Scotian lawyer Hanson Dowell served four years as president of the MAHA from 1936 to 1940, and became the first person from Atlantic Canada to be elected president of the CAHA in 1945.

The MAHA, the Quebec Amateur Hockey Association, and the Ottawa and District Amateur Hockey Association, worked together on a proposal in 1941 to establish an Eastern Canada Hockey Association; where they would oversee the Eastern Canada playoffs to determine one team to play against the Ontario champion, and alleviate their financial struggles by sharing the profits from the gate receipts among themselves before the CAHA took its portion. At the CAHA general meeting in 1942, travel expenses were increased to teams during the playoffs, instead of forming the proposed Eastern Canada Hockey Association.

The CAHA proposed for the Newfoundland Amateur Hockey Association to join the MAHA in 1951, but Newfoundland declined and later became its own branch of the CAHA.

New Brunswick first attempted to become a separate branch of the CAHA in 1953. A second attempt was made in 1967, and after a trial run of one year as its own association, the New Brunswick Amateur Hockey Association separated from the MAHA and became its own branch of the CAHA in 1968.

The Maritime Junior A Hockey League was founded in 1968, to bring the highest level of Canadian junior hockey to the Maritimes. It operated until 1971 when junior hockey was reorganized in Canada, and the league was downgraded to Junior B status.

The MAHA ceased to exist when the Nova Scotia Hockey Association was granted branch status in the CAHA in 1974, and then the Prince Edward Island Hockey Association was formed and also granted branch status in the CAHA.

== Sources ==
- Canadian Amateur Hockey Association (1990). Constitution, By-laws, Regulations, History. Gloucester, Ontario.
