= Show on Shows =

- Genre: Biography
- Narrated by: Chantal Beauregard; John O'Leary
- Country of origin: Canada
- Original language: English
- No. of seasons: 1

Production
- Producer: John Kennedy
- Running time: 30 minutes

Original release
- Network: CBC Television
- Release: 1 November 1964 – 27 June 1965

Show on Shows is a Canadian biographical television program that aired on CBC Television from 1964 to 1965.

== Premise ==
This program featured profiles and contributions of people involved in various artistic fields such as Ralph Allen, Rita Greer Allen (Encore, One of a Kind), Paul Almond, Marie-Claire Blais (author, playwright), Barry Callaghan (writer), Sorel Etrog (sculptor), Timothy Findley (writer), LeRoi Jones (poet, writer), George Luscombe (artistic director, Toronto Workshop Productions), Marya Mannes (author, critic), Ross McLean, Merle Shain (writer), Michael Snow (mixed media artist), Raymond Souster (poet), John Updike (writer) and Joyce Wieland (mixed media artist).

== Scheduling ==
This half-hour program was broadcast Sundays at 5:00 p.m. from 1 November to 27 December 1964, then another run from 4 April to 27 June 1965.
