= Francis Nelson (ice hockey, born 1859) =

Canadian journalist and sportsman (1859–1932)

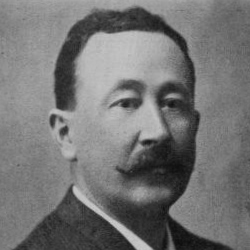
- Born: 1859; Hamilton, Canada West
- Died: April 14, 1932 (aged 72–73); Panama Canal, Panama
- Occupations: Journalist, sports editor
- Honors: Hockey Hall of Fame (1947)

Francis Nelson (1859 – April 14, 1932) was a Canadian journalist and sportsman. Though perhaps best known for his interests in Thoroughbreds, his interests were diversified and he became a bulwark of the Ontario Hockey Association in its struggling years. When John Ross Robertson became the Ontario Hockey Association president in its 10th year of existence, he realized that he needed strong men around him to make the organization a success so he called upon Nelson, sports editor of the Toronto Globe, for assistance. Nelson served as OHA vice president from 1903 to 1905. The following season he was named OHA governor to the Amateur Athletic Union of Canada and was later elected a life member. He was inducted into the Hockey Hall of Fame in 1947.

Nelson was born in Hamilton, Canada West, in 1859 and died on a steamer on the Panama Canal in April 1932 of a heart attack.

In 1933, Canadian Olympic Committee member W. A. Fry published a book for Canadian athletic accomplishments at the 1932 Winter Olympics and 1932 Summer Olympics, and dedicated it to Nelson.
