= The Umbrella =

Canadian arts talk show

- Genre: Talk show
- Presented by: William Ronald
- Narrated by: Lloyd Robertson
- Country of origin: Canada
- Original language: English
- No. of seasons: 1

Production
- Producer: John Kennedy
- Running time: 30 minutes

Original release
- Network: CBC Television
- Release: 3 April – 18 December 1966

Related
- Show on Shows

The Umbrella is a Canadian arts talk show that aired on CBC Television in 1966.

== Premise ==
Artist William Ronald hosted this program concerning contemporary art. In the debut episode, Ronald discussed his paintings with a group of students. Rita Greer Allen, Barry Callaghan, and Timothy Findley were regularly correspondents on the program. Interview subjects during included John Cage, Jack Chambers, Greg Curnoe, Marcel Duchamp (recorded in New York), William Hutt, George and Mike Kuchar, Judy LaMarsh, Michael Langham, Margaret Laurence (recorded in the UK), Brian Macdonald, Henry Moore, Sydney Newman, James Reaney, Larry Rivers, Alan Sillitoe and Arnold Wesker.

Music was provided by a quartet led by Wray Downes of which Ed Bickert was a member.

== Scheduling ==
This half-hour program was broadcast on Sundays at 5 p.m. (Eastern) from 3 April to 26 June 1966 then from 9 October to 18 December 1966.
