= Halifax Wolverines =

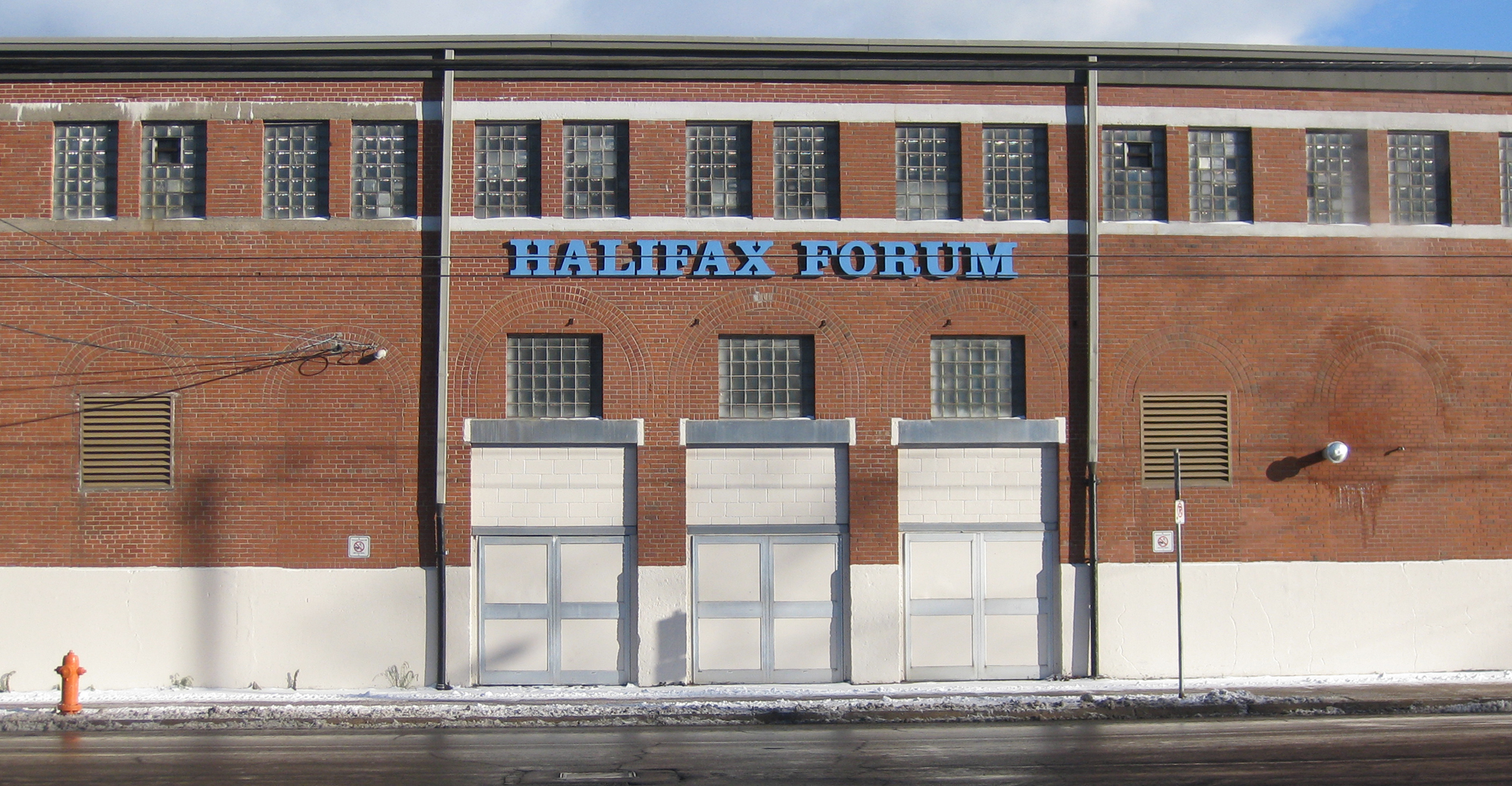
The Halifax Forum was the largest ice hockey rink in the Maritimes and home to the Wolverines.

The Halifax Wolverines (sometimes; Halifax Wolves) were an amateur men's senior ice hockey team based in Halifax, Nova Scotia. The team won the 1935 Allan Cup, and were nominated to represent Canada in ice hockey at the 1936 Winter Olympics but disbanded before playing in the Olympics.

== History ==
The Maritimes saw growth in senior ice hockey during the Great Depression in Canada, as men sought to make a living and it was reported by The Winnipeg Tribune as common knowledge that amateurs were being paid to play in the Maritimes. In December 1934, Canadian Amateur Hockey Association (CAHA) president E. A. Gilroy asked the Maritime Amateur Hockey Association to make a declaration on operating a commercial league which was considered professionalism and not allowed. After a month of negotiations, a senior league was approved that included the Halifax Wolverines.

The Wolverines won the 1935 Allan Cup and were invited to represent Canada in ice hockey at the 1936 Winter Olympics, but disbanded before the following season. Attempts were made to bring the Wolverines team back together for the Olympics according to Amateur Athletic Union of Canada president W. A. Fry, but its players had gone separate ways for personal and financial reasons. In December 1935, Fry announced the Port Arthur Bearcats who were runners up in the 1935 Allan Cup, as "the logical choice" to represent Canada. In January 1936, four members of the Wolverines were invited to play with Port Arthur at the Olympics, but declined when travel expenses were not covered for their families. Fry defended the decision by Gilroy, stating that it was not their responsibility to cover expenses beyond the players. Canadian Olympic Committee secretary-treasurer Fred Marples denied that there had been any agreement to take care of the players' families while they were at the Olympics, and that the Halifax players had left the team voluntarily because they could not get what they wanted in terms of money.

As a result of the Wolverines not playing at the Olympics due to financial issues, the CAHA formed a committee to study the definition of an amateur hockey player with relation to eligibility for international competition. This led to the amateur reforms championed by W. G. Hardy and George Dudley which allowed for travel expenses and compensation of lost wages.
