= 1934 Allan Cup =

Canadian senior ice hockey championship

The Allan Cup trophy

The 1934 Allan Cup was the senior ice hockey championship of the Canadian Amateur Hockey Association (CAHA) for the 1933–34 season.

== Allan Cup final ==
Best of 3

- Fort William 3 Moncton 2
- Moncton 4 Fort William 2
- Moncton 5 Fort William 1

Moncton Hawks beat Fort William Beavers 2-1 on series.

== Hamilton B. Wills Trophy ==
The CAHA resumed international playoffs for senior hockey when W. A. Hewitt arranged a season between the Moncton Hawks and the Detroit White Stars. He then travelled to the United States to locate the Hamilton B. Wills Trophy that had not been competed for since 1925. He believed the trophy to be in the possession of William S. Haddock, who was president of the United States Amateur Hockey Association when it folded. The Moncton Hawks won the international series, but the trophy had still not been located at the time.
