= Umbrellas (band) =

American indie rock band

- Origin: Oklahoma, United States
- Genres: Indie rock pop
- Years active: 2005–present
- Members: Scott Windsor; Sammy Sharon

Umbrellas are an American indie rock band formed in 2005 by former the Lyndsay Diaries frontman, Scott Windsor. After they fulfilled their contract with the Militia Group, they released their Beach Front Property EP independently in June 2007. The band's debut album was recorded in a pseudo-haunted house, and their second album was recorded in an abandoned comedy club. Their song "The City Lights" was featured during the climax of the Grey's Anatomy episode "Into You Like a Train", and "Ships" was featured during the Grey's Anatomy episode "Great Expectations", as well as the 7th episode of the first season of the TV series Jericho.

Umbrellas' second studio album, Illuminare, was given a rating of one and a half by Punknews.org.

== Band members ==
- Scott Windsor – vocals, guitar
- Sammy Sharon – drums, percussion

Touring

- Nick Hughes – keys
- Sethy McCarroll – bass
- Geordan Taylor – bass

Studio

- Chad Copelin – producer, keys, guitar, bass, miscellaneous
- Eric Arndt – bass
- Jarod Evans – guitar, keys, miscellaneous
- Ryan Lindsey – piano, background vocals
- James McAlister – drums, percussion, programming
- Sethy McCarroll – bass
- Nathan Price – drums, percussion
- Costa Stansinopoulos – programming, background vocals

== Discography ==
Studio albums

- Umbrellas (The Militia Group, 2005)
- Illuminare (The Militia Group, 2006)

EPs

- Beach Front Property (2007)
