= 1935 Allan Cup =

Canadian senior ice hockey championship

The Allan Cup was the championship trophy for amateur senior ice hockey in Canada.

The 1935 Allan Cup was the senior ice hockey championship of the Canadian Amateur Hockey Association (CAHA) for the 1934–35 season. In the best-of-three final, the Halifax Wolverines defeated the Port Arthur Bearcats two games to none.

== Final ==
In the best-of-three final, the Halifax Wolverines defeated the Port Arthur Bearcats two games to none.

- Halifax 3 Port Arthur 2
- Halifax 4 Port Arthur 3

== 1936 Winter Olympics ==
The Halifax Wolverines were chosen to represent Canada in ice hockey at the 1936 Winter Olympics. The Wolverines subsequently disbanded before the 1935–36 season. The Port Arthur Bearcats were invited and promptly accepted. They had lost only one player from the previous season and were given the possibility of adding up to four players from the Wolverines. Great Britain went on to capture the gold medal and Canada received the silver medal. The 1936 tournament was the first time in which Canada did not win the gold medal in ice hockey at the Olympic Games, which led to the CAHA and its president E. A. Gilroy being heavily scrutinized by media in Canada.
