= Ralph Allen (journalist) =

Canadian journalist, editor, and novelist

- Born: August 25, 1913; Winnipeg, Manitoba
- Died: December 2, 1966 (aged 53); Toronto, Ontario
- Occupations: Journalist, editor, novelist

Ralph Allen (August 25, 1913 – December 2, 1966) was a Canadian journalist, editor, and novelist.

Born in Winnipeg, Manitoba, Allen was raised and educated in Oxbow, Saskatchewan. At sixteen he became a sports reporter for The Winnipeg Tribune, before moving to Toronto's renowned The Globe and Mail where he served as a war correspondent during the Second World War. In 1946, he joined news magazine Maclean's, becoming editor in 1950. He left Maclean's in 1960 and worked for The Toronto Star from 1964 until his death in 1966.

Allen was the author of several books, including the novel Peace River Country (1958) and Ordeal by Fire: Canada, 1910-1945 (1961), a history of Canada during the period of the two world wars. In 1967, Christina McCall edited a collection of Allen's newspaper and magazine columns entitled The Man From Oxbow.

Oxbow's town museum is named in Allen's honour. He was inducted into the Canadian Football Hall of Fame in 1990.

== Books by Allen ==
- Home Made Banners (Toronto, London, New York: Longmans, Green and Co., 1946), a novel about World War II
- The Chartered Libertine (Toronto: Macmillan, 1954), a novel about the CBC
- Peace River Country (Garden City, NY: Doubleday & Company, Inc., 1958), a novel about a family's search for a home in Canada's Peace River Country
- Ordeal by Fire: Canada, 1910-1945 (Toronto: Doubleday Canada Limited, 1961), a history of Canada from World War I to World War II
- Ask the Name of the Lion (Garden City, NY: Doubleday & Company, Inc., 1962), a novel about conflict in the Congo
- The High White Forest (Garden City, NY: Doubleday & Company, Inc., 1964), a novel about Canadians in the Battle of the Bulge
- The Man from Oxbow: The Best of Ralph Allen (Toronto, Montreal: McClelland and Stewart Limited, 1967), a collection of some of Allen's newspaper and magazine columns, edited with an introduction by Christina McCall Newman
