= Cecil Duncan =

Canadian ice hockey administrator (1893–1979)

- Born: February 1, 1893; Ottawa, Ontario, Canada
- Died: December 25, 1979 (aged 86); Ottawa, Ontario, Canada
- Resting place: Beechwood Cemetery
- Occupations: Civil servant, accountant
- Known for: Canadian Amateur Hockey Association president; Ligue Internationale de Hockey sur Glace vice-president; Ottawa District Hockey Association secretary-treasurer
- Awards: Ottawa Sport Hall of Fame

Cecil Charles Duncan (February 1, 1893 – December 25, 1979) was a Canadian ice hockey administrator. He served as president of the Canadian Amateur Hockey Association (CAHA) from 1936 to 1938 and led reforms towards semi-professionalism in ice hockey in Canada. He served as chairman of the CAHA committee which proposed a new definition of amateur to eliminate what it called "shamateurism", in the wake of Canada's struggles in ice hockey at the 1936 Winter Olympics. He negotiated a series of agreements to protect the CAHA's interests, and to develop relationships with all other areas of the world where hockey was played. The agreements allowed the CAHA to become independent of the Amateur Athletic Union of Canada which wanted to keep the old definition of pure amateurism. Duncan's reforms also returned the CAHA to affluence after four years of deficits during the Great Depression and increased player registrations in Canada.

Duncan was the first Canadian to be elected to the executive of the Ligue Internationale de Hockey sur Glace and served as a board member of the Ottawa District Hockey Association for 51 years. He oversaw and arranged senior ice hockey in the Ottawa Valley and used local leagues to experiment with changes to the ice hockey rules to reduce offside infractions. Duncan and National Hockey League rules committee chairman Frank Boucher introduced the centre red line to the ice hockey rink in the 1943–44 season. Duncan also managed an Ottawa team in the Ontario Rugby Football Union and served as vice-president of Quebec Rugby Union. He was posthumously inducted into the Ottawa Sport Hall of Fame in 2006, in the builder category for ice hockey.

== Early sporting career ==
Cecil Charles Duncan was born on February 1, 1893, in Ottawa, Ontario. He played lacrosse and baseball as a youth, then competed in boxing from 1910 to 1920.

Duncan became involved in sports administration in Ottawa after retiring as an athlete and served as a board member of the Ottawa District Hockey Association (ODHA) for 51 years. His primary role within the ODHA was as its secretary-treasurer to oversee registration and finances. He also served on the registration committee for the Canadian Amateur Hockey Association (CAHA) and proposed to establish a national playoff for the intermediate senior ice hockey level. He voiced opposition to the CAHA ruling that players who tried out with professional teams would lose their amateur status and stated that if the rule were to be strictly enforced, it could mean the demise of the league in the Ottawa Valley if teams were deprived of their best players. He supported updating the residency rules to prevent mass movement of hockey players about the country, instead of the CAHA blindly approving the transfers due to the economic situation caused by the Great Depression.

Duncan assembled an amateur Ottawa All-stars team of players from the National Capital Region to play an exhibition series in Europe during December 1931 and January 1932. The series included games in France, Switzerland, Poland, Czechoslovakia, and England; and the team included future professional Bill Cowley as a 19-year-old. In April 1932, Duncan was appointed by the CAHA to a committee to arrange international ice hockey tours with the British Ice Hockey Association (BIHA).

Duncan was involved with the Amateur Athletic Union of Canada (AAU of C) from 1929 to 1932. He was named to its Olympic committee in 1929 and was chairman of the AAU of C baseball committee to decide on a national champion. He was named vice-chairman of the AAU of C committee to reorganize the National Amateur Baseball Association in 1930, and was named to the fencing committee in 1931. Other sporting interests included representing boxing from Ottawa at the Canadian Olympic Committee meetings, and serving as secretary of the junior football league in Ottawa where he represented the league at Canadian Rugby Union meetings.

== CAHA vice-president ==
Duncan served as second vice-president of the CAHA from April 1932 to April 1934. He sat on the ice hockey rules committee which considered recent changes made in the National Hockey League (NHL) and whether to implement them in the CAHA.

Duncan was elected first vice-president in April 1934. He sat on the CAHA's registration committee which oversaw player transfer requests and implemented new regulations to prevent regional shifts of talent. The CAHA subsequently chose not to grant transfers between its branches after December during the playing season, in an effort to stop the "hockey tourist" who moved about the country to play in mercantile leagues. Duncan then issued suspensions for players who had not completed proper transfers and declined any new requests.

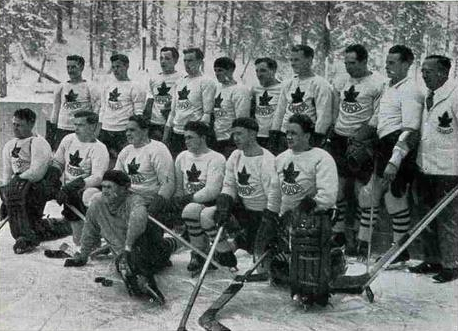
Canada men's national ice hockey team photo at the 1936 Winter Olympics

Duncan was in charge of organizing the 1935 Allan Cup final, and arranged for the 1935 Memorial Cup champions to play a tour in the United Kingdom to coincide with the Canada men's national ice hockey team tour of Europe in advance of ice hockey at the 1936 Winter Olympics.

Duncan was re-elected first vice-president of the CAHA in April 1935. He arbitrated a dispute for the Thunder Bay Manitoba Senior Hockey League championship and laid out terms for a three-game series in response to eligibility concerns for the 1936 Allan Cup playoffs and to which CAHA branch the Winnipeg Hockey Club belonged. He later contested the eligibility of the Montreal Senior Hockey Group for the Allan Cup playoffs due to charges of professionalism in the league.

The 1935 Allan Cup champions Halifax Wolverines were chosen to represent Canada in ice hockey at the 1936 Winter Olympics. Despite press reports of a four-team preseason series in Montreal to choose a team, Duncan and fellow CAHA executives denied there were ever plans for such a series. The Wolverines subsequently folded and the Port Arthur Bearcats were selected to represent Canada instead, with four players added from the defunct Wolverines. The four Wolverines players were later removed from the national team when they demanded remuneration from the CAHA to assist their families while overseas.

Duncan served as chairman of the CAHA committee which proposed a new definition of amateur, in the wake of Canada's struggles at the Olympics and loss of the gold medal to the Great Britain men's national ice hockey team. The CAHA wanted to eliminate what it called "shamateurism" and revealed "four points" to its new vision of an amateur. The AAU of C wanted to keep the old definition of pure amateurism and was opposed to semi-professionalism in sport. The Winnipeg Free Press reported that support for the reforms was strong, despite opposition by the "old guard" within the AAU of C. Duncan also proposed a resolution that the word "amateur" be dropped from the CAHA name.

The "four points" were:

1. Hockey players may capitalize on their ability as hockey players for the purpose of obtaining legitimate employment.
2. Hockey players may accept from their clubs or employers payment for time lost, from work while competing on behalf of their clubs. They will not however, be allowed to hold "shadow" jobs under the clause.
3. Amateur hockey teams may play exhibition games against professional teams under such conditions as may be laid down by the individual branches of the CAHA.
4. Professionals in another sport will be allowed to play under the CAHA jurisdiction as amateurs.

The CAHA approved the "four points" at its general meeting in April 1936 and sent the matter to the AAU of C for consideration by a mail-in vote. The CAHA executive was empowered to take action as seen fit regardless of the vote's outcome.

== CAHA president ==
=== First term ===
The Memorial Cup represented the junior hockey championship of Canada.

Duncan was elected president of the CAHA on April 14, 1936, succeeding E. A. Gilroy. Duncan and the CAHA approved cuts to expenditures for player allowances and team expenses for national playoffs, after an operating loss of C$7,000 during the 1935–36 season due to declining revenues at Allan Cup and Memorial Cup games. The CAHA banned movement of players to the United Kingdom until an agreement was reached with the BIHA and approved a draft agreement with the United States to limit the number of transfers and recognize each other's suspensions.

AAU of C president W. A. Fry issued an ultimatum to the CAHA in a letter to Duncan on May 6, 1936. Fry decreed that if the CAHA went ahead with its amateur definition reforms and break away from the AAU of C, the CAHA would lose the right to participate in ice hockey at the Olympic Games since the AAU of C was aligned with the Canadian Olympic Committee. Fry also stated that the AAU of C would not entertain the proposals nor have a mail-in vote on the question. Duncan was critical of Fry for publishing quotes from the letter in his Dunnville Chronicle before the letter was received.

Duncan pushed ahead negotiating a series of agreements with other hockey associations, to develop relationships which protected the CAHA's interests and make itself independent of the AAU of C. In June 1936, the CAHA and the BIHA reached an agreement to govern and require transfers between the associations and recognition of each other's suspensions. The CAHA also sought legal advice which assured it would retain control of the Allan Cup and Memorial Cup.

The Winnipeg Tribune reported that Duncan and the CAHA had already taken the first steps to separate in November 1936, since players in the ODHA and the Saskatchewan Amateur Hockey Association were not required to get a registration card from the AAU of C. Duncan announced that the CAHA had reached an alliance with the South African Ice Hockey Federation on December 9, 1936. The agreement meant that the CAHA now had formal relations with all areas where organized hockey was played, including previous alliances with the United States, Great Britain and Europe.

On December 15, 1936, Duncan formally notified new AAU of C president Jack Hamilton in writing that the CAHA would terminate its articles of alliance effective January 15, 1937. Duncan noted the lack of support for CAHA proposals and that the AAU of C did not enforce CAHA suspensions. He asserted the intent of the CAHA to remain the governing body of ice hockey in Canada. He reiterated to teams and leagues that registration with the CAHA would prevent against rosters being raided and players being signed by other countries, since the CAHA had its own agreements in place. Hamilton replied that there should be no quarrels between the CAHA and AAU of C, and instead a friendly rivalry. Duncan later implied that had Hamilton been president of the AAU of C when the "four points" were proposed, the separation might have been avoided.

The Quebec Amateur Hockey Association (QAHA) condemned severing relations with the AAU of C. Duncan interpreted the QAHA position as its intent to withdraw from the CAHA. He ruled all leagues within the QAHA ineligible for national playoffs, except for the Montreal Senior Group which pledged allegiance to the CAHA and the Allan Cup and then considered setting up a committee to govern hockey in Quebec. He also reiterated that the CAHA executive were the rightful trustees of the Allan Cup and had the right to oversee its playoffs, despite protests by CAHA finance chairman and former cup trustee Claude C. Robinson.

In January 1937, Duncan announced plans for an international amateur series where the English National League champion would come to North America, to play against the winner of a series between the Allan Cup champion of Canada and the amateur champion of the United States. He later confirmed that either the Wembley Lions or Harringay Racers would come to Toronto in April 1937.

Duncan attended the congress of the Ligue Internationale de Hockey sur Glace (LIHG) in February 1937 and was elected second vice-president to become the first Canadian to serve on the LIHG executive. The LIHG updated its constitution to give national hockey associations the right to sanction amateur and professional events within their own jurisdiction, including exhibition games between amateur teams and professional teams. The change allowed meant such exhibition games would no longer affect the amateur status of players for the Olympics. Duncan felt that these changes gave associations more power to govern their own affairs and paved the way for the CAHA to introduce its own legislation for the immediate reinstatement of professionals as amateurs, instead of a five-year waiting period.

The Amateur Athletic Union of the United States ended its working agreement with the CAHA in March 1937, since the CAHA had broken ties with the AAU of C. Duncan expected the CAHA to negotiate an agreement directly with the Eastern Amateur Hockey League (EAHL), which was the top amateur league in the United States. The EAHL began its own process of breaking away from the Amateur Athletic Union due to charges of professionalism. Duncan announced plans for an International Amateur Hockey League to begin in the 1937–38 season, composed of an interlocking schedule between the Montreal Senior Group and the EAHL. He also announced plans to continue the international championship series between the CAHA, EAHL and English National League champions.

The QAHA protested the selection of Calgary as the location for the 1937 Allan Cup finals. Duncan stated the choice was made based on where the CAHA felt interest would be greatest and remained firm on the decision. The Montreal Senior Group then stated its league would not be represented in the Allan Cup playoffs in the protest. Duncan inquired directly with the Quebec Aces as the league champions and reached an agreement for the team to participate in the playoffs despite the protest.

=== Second term ===
The Allan Cup was the championship trophy for amateur senior ice hockey in Canada.

Duncan was re-elected president of the CAHA in April 1937 and received a vote of confidence in how he handled the Allan Cup playoffs. The QAHA chose to remain affiliated with the CAHA and dropped its protests. The CAHA planned two annual European tours and gave the Allan Cup champions and finalists the first right of refusal to go to Europe. The CAHA had its greatest number of participants yet with 21,841 players registered in the 1936–37 season, and profited more than $34,000 from the finals of the Allan Cup in Calgary and the Memorial Cup in Toronto.

The CAHA updated its constitution with three of the "four points", but excluded the fourth point where professionals in another sport were allowed as amateurs. The changes brought the CAHA inline with the recent LIHG changes and the CAHA agreed to ask the LIHG to approve the fourth point and then update the CAHA constitution later. The CAHA abolished its finance committee and assigned those duties to the president, and the positions of secretary and registrar-treasurer would be appointed by the executive. The CAHA also reserved the right to replace any branch which resigned.

In August 1937, the EAHL formally broke ties with the Amateur Athletic Union of the United States. Duncan and fellow CAHA executives signed an agreement with EAHL president Tommy Lockhart to govern the movement of players, limit the number of transfers to the United States, and protect rosters in Canada. Teams in the EAHL were given access to a maximum of 30 Canadians total for the league, with no more than one player from any team in Canada.

On December 9, 1937, Duncan suspended the QAHA and declared its teams ineligible for the Allan Cup or Memorial Cup playoffs. The suspension came after the QAHA disregarded a CAHA decision by admitting the Boston Olympics into its senior hockey league. Duncan established a CAHA committee to govern hockey in Quebec and invited teams interested in competing for the national championships. Leagues within the province vowed to stand by the decision of the QAHA, and its officials threatened to affiliate with the AAU of C. Duncan stated that he didn't care if the QAHA returned, although peace prevailed and the association was reinstated in January 1938.

Duncan accompanied the Sudbury Wolves when the team represented Canada and won the gold medal at the 1938 Ice Hockey World Championships in Prague and the team on the corresponding European tour from December 1937 to February 1938. Duncan attended the LIHG congress held in conjunction with the World Championships and assisted in convincing the LIHG to permit a limited number of Canadian-trained players with British heritage to be eligible for Great Britain's national team. Duncan was re-elected to the LIHG executive at the same congress. Upon return to Canada, he mentioned the possibility of European national teams touring Canada en route to the 1940 Winter Olympics in Japan. He envisioned the CAHA overseeing a professional hockey league within Canada as permitted by the LIHG constitutional changes, and he expected the international series to continue between Canada, the United States and the United Kingdom.

During two years as president, Duncan returned the CAHA to affluence after four years of deficits that totalled almost $49,000. The CAHA was now able to create a $35,000 trust fund to be used for the national team at the Olympics or future years with operating deficits. The CAHA resumed giving grants to its branches to promote minor hockey that had stopped during the Great Depression and also resumed alternating the Allan Cup and Memorial Cup finals between Eastern Canada and Western Canada instead of only limiting host cities to the most profitable locations.

== CAHA past-president ==
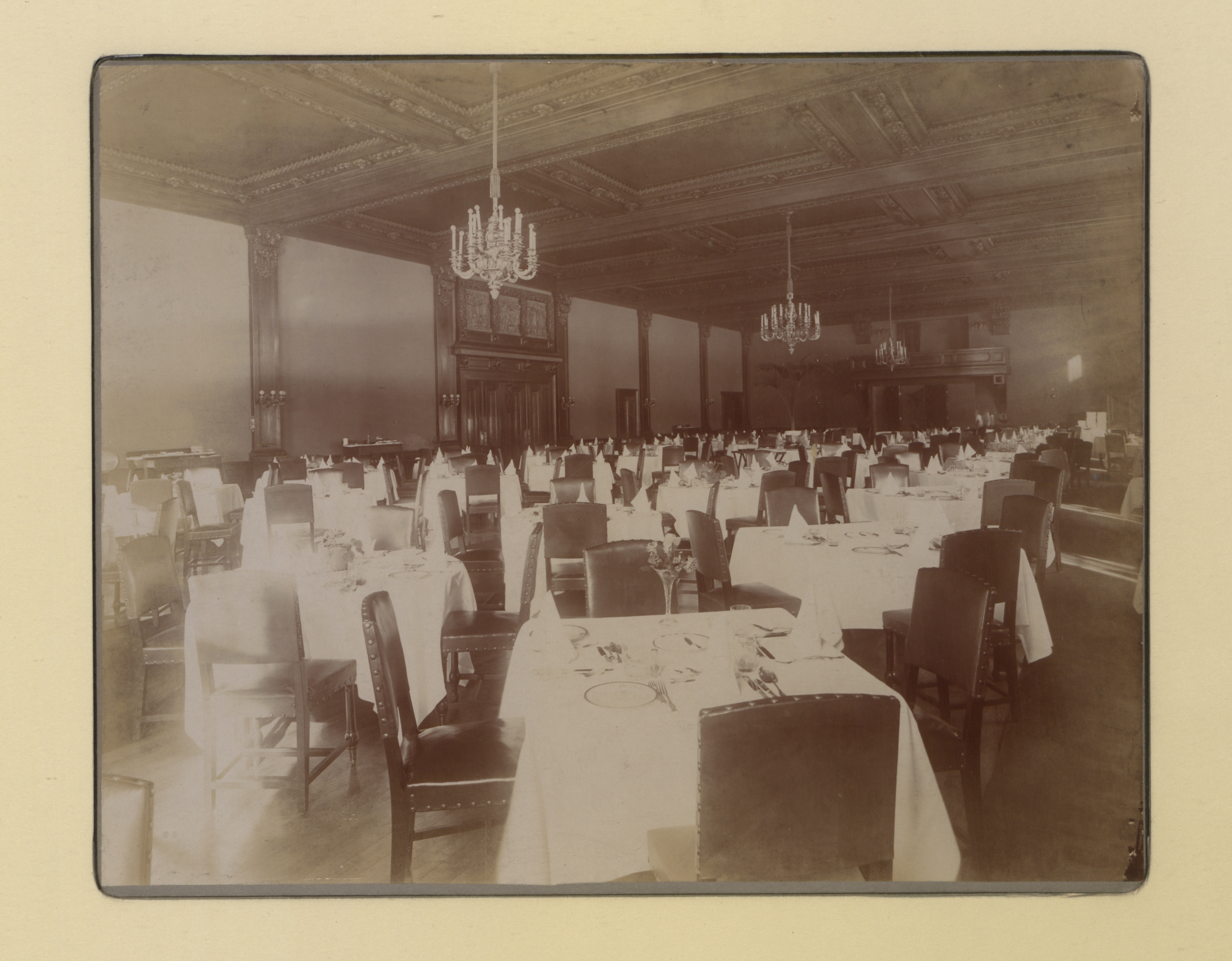
Royal Alexandra Hotel drawing room

Duncan was succeeded by W. G. Hardy as CAHA president on April 18, 1938, and remained on the CAHA executive as its past-president until April 1940. Duncan continued to serve as the LIHG vice president until 1939. He was a guest at the CAHA silver jubilee hosted at the Royal Alexandra Hotel in Winnipeg, where eleven of thirteen past presidents were in attendance.

Duncan was critical of the CAHA agreement signed with the NHL that went into effect in 1939. He had refused to sign the agreement while president since he felt it would have let the NHL control players as it wanted. He was opposed to the general trafficking of players into the NHL and players being placed unknowingly on negotiation lists for professional teams without compensation to amateur teams. He referenced the case of Eddie Finnigan who was suspended for a year by the CAHA since the NHL wanted financial compensation for unfinished contractual services when he retired, which led to the NHL asking the contract be bought out for the player to be reinstated as an amateur.

In 1940, Duncan recommended for CAHA members and hockey officials to finance a weekly CBC Radio show to communicate hockey scores and highlights for the Canadian soldiers overseas during World War II. As a follow-up to the changes in the LIHG constitution, he proposed to change the CAHA constitution to read, "governing body of hockey in Canada in accordance with the Ligue Internationale de Hockey sur Glace", instead of the association being only the governing body of amateur hockey in Canada. He also wanted to expand intermediate division playoffs in Canada and recommended that the intermediate champion of Quebec play against similar teams from the Maritimes, instead of the higher level senior hockey champion from Quebec.

== Impact on ice hockey rules ==
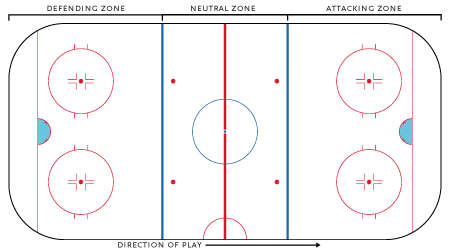
Duncan helped introduce the centre red line to the ice hockey rink in the 1943–44 season.

Duncan submitted several recommendations while on the CAHA rules committee in 1933, and sought for consistency with the NHL's playing rules. He recommended to allow the forward pass in all three zones instead of an offside infraction, to allow kicking off the puck in the defensive zone, but to disallow checking of players not in possession of the puck.

In October 1936, Duncan tested a change to avoid automatic offside infractions in a match between the hometown Ottawa Senators and the visiting Springfield Indians. In a January 1937 game, he experimented with a single blue-line at centre ice as per a suggestion by Frank Boucher to cut down on the number of offside infractions in a game. Rules of play at the time stated that a puck could not be passed over a blue line by either team.

In February 1937, the LIHG adopted the playing rules of the CAHA for international matches with a few minor exceptions. Duncan felt the differences were insignificant and the decision promoted global uniformity in playing the game. In April 1937, he appointed NHL referee Clarence Campbell as the interpreter of the playing rules and a reference person for branches in the CAHA.

Duncan recycled an idea from Frank Patrick and experimented with five-man hockey in the Ottawa and District Senior Hockey League during the 1939–40 regular season, then six men for the playoffs. The innovation was intended to produce more individual play, stick handling and skilled players. Journalist Scott Young criticized the experiment; he felt that stick handling was less important with the increase of the number of substitutes available during a game and that the change would actually promote use of more substitutes as players tired.

In May 1941, Duncan was critical of the lack of consistency in refereeing across Canada. He felt that referees in Eastern Canada were more strict in the interest of safety, whereas the Western Canada played a rougher more dangerous style.

Duncan and NHL rules committee chairman Frank Boucher introduced the centre red line to the ice hockey rink in the 1943–44 season, in an effort to open up the game by reducing the number of offside infractions and create excitement with quicker counter-attacks. The change allowed the defending team to pass the puck to out of their own zone up to the red line, instead of being required to skate over the nearest blue line then pass the puck forward.

In 1947, Duncan sought for the CAHA to implement European rules of play that restricted checking to a team's defensive zone, since he wanted to see a wide-open style of play that made it easier to counter-attack.

== Later sporting career ==
In May 1941, Duncan was concerned that the CAHA was dealing with the "commercial consideration" of the game, rather than the welfare of its branches. He also stated the ODHA was considering a merger with the QAHA and the Maritime Amateur Hockey Association (MAHA) into the Eastern Canada Amateur Hockey Association and cited disagreements that eastern and western delegates had on national playoffs.

Duncan was involved in organizing sports in Ottawa to contribute to the war effort. He was part of a delegation to confer with James Ralston, the Minister of National Defence of Canada to determine the role of the Interprovincial Rugby Football Union which Duncan represented. He wanted to promote hockey for the military servicemen stationed in the Ottawa area and organized the National Defence Hockey League, with its teams eligible for the Allan Cup playoffs. He recommended to the CAHA to guarantee non-military teams a place in the Allan Cup playoffs, despite the competition being dominated by the Royal Canadian Air Force and Canadian Army teams.

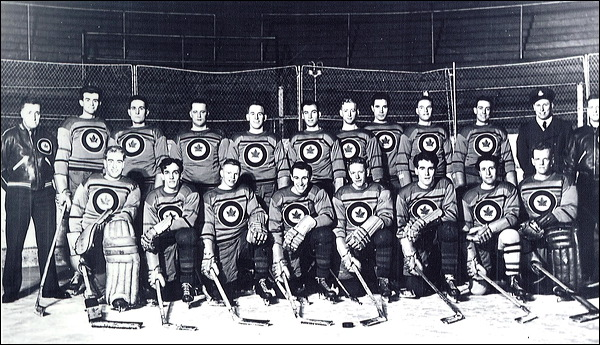
The Ottawa RCAF Flyers were one of several Canadian military sports teams based in Ottawa for which Duncan organized league play.

Duncan served as manager for the Ottawa Tigers senior team in the Ontario Rugby Football Union from 1945 to 1946. During the same time, he also served as vice-president of Quebec Rugby Union, secretary of Ottawa Junior Football League, and secretary of the Eastern Ontario Baseball Association.

Duncan attended the LIHG congress during the 1947 Ice Hockey World Championships, where the CAHA asked for recognition of its newest definition of amateur as anyone who was not actively engaged in a professional sport and the proposed merger of the International Ice Hockey Association with the LIHG. At the 1947 general meeting of the CAHA, Duncan was opposed to the increasing commercialization of junior ice hockey and direct sponsorship of teams by the NHL. After the CAHA implemented contracts for junior and senior players, he felt it was recognition of the unofficial semi-professionalism of the CAHA.

Duncan proposed a major series for senior ice hockey in 1948, since he was concerned that certain teams would continue to dominate Allan Cup competition. He submitted a resolution at the general meeting in 1949, for the CAHA to consider the Quebec Senior Hockey League a professional league affiliated with the NHL. He stated that due to the number of times the league had threatened to withdraw from the CAHA and become professional, it would be better for hockey in the region. He later withdrew the resolution and stated he submitted it because of recurring rumours that the ODHA, QAHA, and MAHA would withdraw from the CAHA. In 1952, Duncan submitted a resolution to the CAHA to request that the NHL limit its reserve list to 30 players, instead of the practice of 75 players at the time. He felt that the NHL and its professional minor leagues were dictating policy and player movements to the CAHA.

Duncan assisted in organizing the Interprovincial Senior Hockey League to revive senior ice hockey in the Ottawa Valley for the 1958–59 season. He also sought for the CAHA to cut its administration costs and redirect more profits from the Allan Cup and Memorial Cup into financing less wealthy leagues in Canada.

In November 1962, Duncan welcomed the Soviet Union national ice hockey team to Canada on behalf of the CAHA. He met the team at the Montreal–Dorval International Airport and accompanied them to Ottawa. He then acted as a chaperone for the Eastern Canada portion of the Soviet tour of Canada. He envisioned there would soon be an international league composed of national teams from Canada, the United States, Soviet Union, Sweden, Czechoslovakia and other European teams. He later recommended that when Canadian teams make international tours of Europe, they should be accompanied by on-ice officials who were accustomed to the Canadian style of play to avoid instances with international officiating.

== Personal life ==
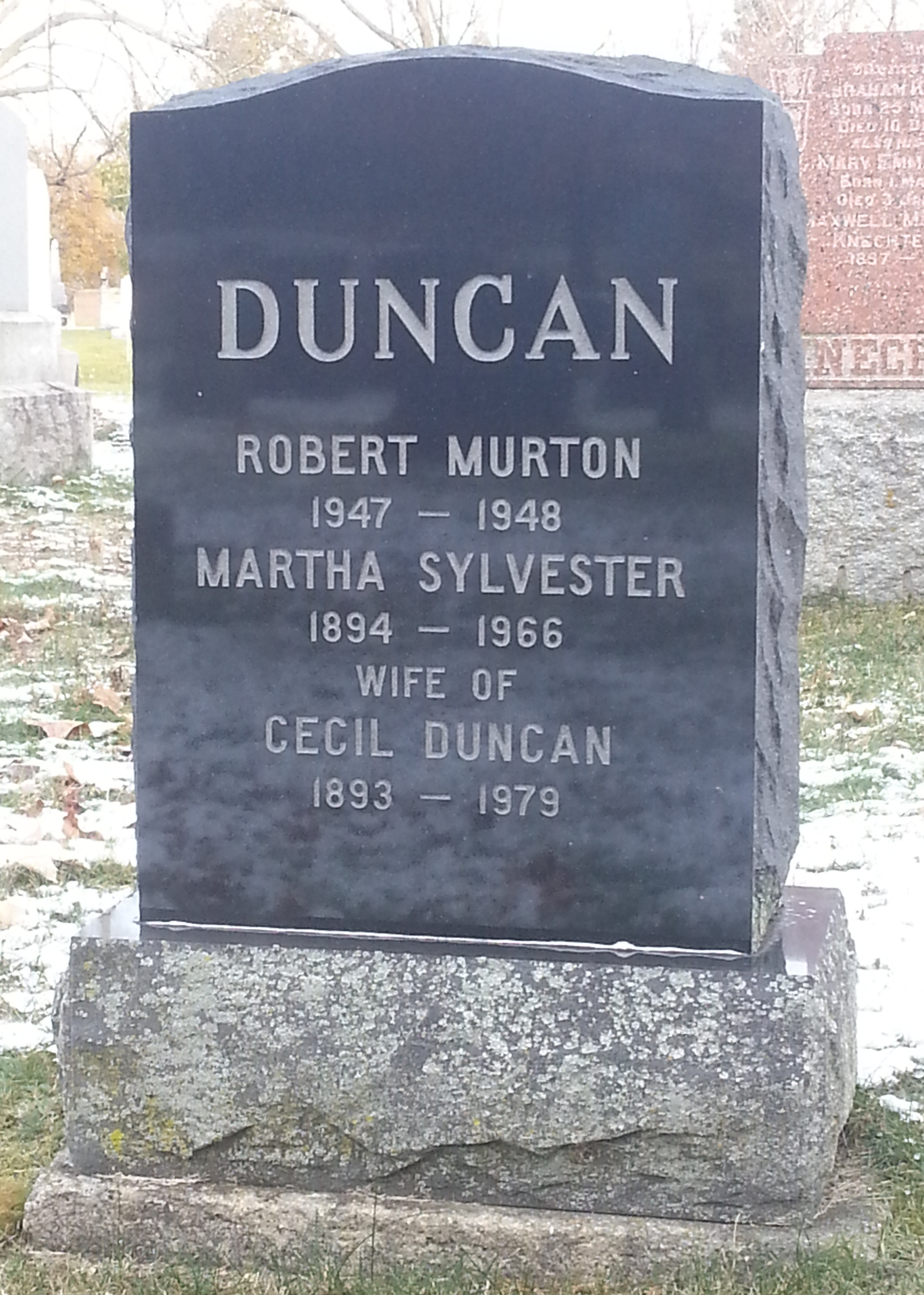
Duncan's grave stone in Beechwood Cemetery

Duncan was a civil servant and accountant within the Treasury Board, which oversaw pensions and healthcare in Canada. He was reported to be a business-first person and took exception to phone calls regarding hockey matters during business hours. He was married to Martha Sylvester Duncan, with whom he had one daughter. He died on December 25, 1979, in Ottawa, Ontario, and was interred at Beechwood Cemetery.

== Legacy and honours ==
Duncan was honoured by the LIHG with a diploma of merit in February 1937, for his contributions to international ice hockey.

After his presidency of the CAHA concluded in 1938, The Canadian Press credited Duncan for "brilliant executive work" and for strengthening the CAHA and returning it to affluence. The CAHA recognized Duncan with a life membership in April 1941.

Duncan received the Amateur Hockey Association of the United States (AHAUS) citation award in 1950, for contributions to hockey in the United States, and was later made a life member of AHAUS.

Other honours include the Ontario Hockey Association Gold Stick for outstanding service to the game in Ontario in 1953, the Ontario Sport Achievement Award in 1975, and a special citation by the Government of Ontario in 1976.

Duncan was posthumously inducted into the Ottawa Sport Hall of Fame in 2006, in the builder category for ice hockey.

== Bibliography ==
- Hardy, Stephen; Holman, Andrew C. (2018). Hockey: A Global History. Champaign, Illinois: University of Illinois Press. ISBN 978-0-252-05094-7 – via Google Books.
- McKinley, Michael (2006). Hockey: A People's History. Toronto, Ontario: McClelland & Stewart. ISBN 978-0-7710-5771-7 – via Google Books.
- Ferguson, Bob (2005). Who's Who in Canadian Sport, Volume 4. Markham, Ontario: Fitzhenry & Whiteside. ISBN 1-55041-855-6.
- Constitution, By-laws, Regulations, History. Gloucester, Ontario: Canadian Amateur Hockey Association. May 1990.
