= Hal Trumble =

American ice hockey official and executive (1926–2010)

- Born: August 28, 1926; Minneapolis, Minnesota, US
- Died: March 5, 2010 (aged 83); San Clemente, California, US
- Known for: Executive director of AHAUS; Manager of Team USA; IIHF ice hockey referee
- Awards: U.S. Hockey Hall of Fame; IIHF Hall of Fame

Harold L. Trumble Jr. (August 28, 1926 – March 5, 2010) was an American ice hockey administrator and referee. He served as the executive director of the Amateur Hockey Association of the United States from 1972 to 1987, and managed the United States men's national ice hockey team to a silver medal at the 1972 Winter Olympics. He previously refereed games in the 1968 Winter Olympics, and was later inducted into the United States Hockey Hall of Fame, and the IIHF Hall of Fame.

== Early life ==
Harold L. Trumble Jr. was born on August 28, 1926, in Minneapolis, Minnesota. He began playing ice hockey as a child, then in high school, and later in a senior ice hockey league. In addition to refereeing ice hockey, he was also an international softball and baseball umpire.

== Refereeing career ==
Trumble began his career as an ice hockey referee by officiating high school and college level games. He later spent 18 years officiating at the international level. He was chosen to referee ice hockey at the 1968 Winter Olympics, and was put in charge of the final games which decided the gold, silver and bronze medals. He later served as the technical director for the International Ice Hockey Federation (IIHF) referee committee from 1972 to 1982.

== Administrator career ==
Trumble served as commissioner of the United States Hockey League (USHL) during the 1960s. He was at odds with the Amateur Hockey Association of the United States (AHAUS) and its president Tommy Lockhart, regarding the perceived lack of support from AHAUS for teams in the USHL. Lockhart was also president of the Eastern Hockey League, and that league announced plans to put teams in Michigan and Minnesota, after the USHL did not pay dues to AHAUS.

Trumble was the general manager of the United States men's national ice hockey team for the 1970 World Ice Hockey Championships Pool B in Bucharest, the 1971 World Ice Hockey Championships Pool A in Switzerland, and the silver medal-winning team at the 1972 Winter Olympics in Sapporo. He admitted that his job was mostly administrative in nature, such as making travel arrangements and making the team aware of the rules of the competition. He successfully pursued players on military duty to play on the national team, including Stuart Irving, Dick McGlynn and Henry Boucha; and also chose future National Hockey League (NHL) players Mark Howe and Robbie Ftorek. Trumble later managed the American men's national team at the 1983 World Ice Hockey Championships Pool B in Tokyo.

Trumble became the first person to serve as the full-time executive director of AHAUS, working in that position from 1972 to 1987. He successfully led AHAUS from operating a deficit into a profitable business with its own office in Colorado Springs, Colorado, growing the full-time staff from two employees to fifteen. Trumble increased the number of teams registered with AHAUS from 7,015 in 1972, to 11,543 teams by 1985, and increased the number of referees from 3,178 to 8,434 in the same time period. He also implemented clinics for coaches and referees, and began other publications to promote the game. He authored the 1975 book Coaching Youth Ice Hockey, and the 1976 book Youth Ice Hockey. He also released videos about ice hockey skills, and training techniques.

Trumble also made AHAUS the sole governing body for ice hockey in the country, which included representing the interests of the United States Olympic Committee. During his tenure, AHAUS became a member of the IIHF, and the men's national team won the gold medal at the 1980 Winter Olympics, on home ice in Lake Placid, New York. Trumble campaigned against the use of professionals at the Olympics, due to the success of the men's national team program in which collegiate athletes played for the United States, and delayed their professional careers. In 1986, he asked for the International Olympic Committee to disallow players who had signed a professional contract, instead of just those who had played in the NHL from participating in the Olympics.

== Personal life ==
In 1981, Trumble acted as president of the National Council of the Youth Sports Directors. Later he worked 15 years as the manager of the Tijeras Creek Golf Club in Orange County, California.

Trumble was married Ida Mae Trumble for 36 years, and had two sons and two stepdaughters. He died on March 5, 2010, in San Clemente, California.

== Awards and honors ==
Trumble was inducted into the United States Hockey Hall of Fame in 1985, in the builder category. He was later inducted into the IIHF Hall of Fame in 1999, in the builder category. He was first person to receive the USA Hockey Builders Award in 1999.
