= Tommy Lockhart =

American ice hockey administrator (1892–1979)

- Born: March 21, 1892; New York City, US
- Died: May 18, 1979 (aged 87); New York City, US
- Occupations: Ice hockey administrator, business manager, and events promoter
- Known for: Amateur Hockey Association of the United States; Eastern Hockey League; New York Rangers; International Ice Hockey Association
- Awards: Hockey Hall of Fame; United States Hockey Hall of Fame; Lester Patrick Trophy

Thomas Finan Lockhart (March 21, 1892 – May 18, 1979) was an American ice hockey administrator, business manager, and events promoter. He was president of the Eastern Hockey League from 1933 to 1972, and was the founding president of the Amateur Hockey Association of the United States (AHAUS) in 1937, which later became USA Hockey. He led AHAUS into the International Ice Hockey Association in 1940, then into the Ligue Internationale de Hockey sur Glace in 1947. He managed operations at Old Madison Square Garden, introduced fans to innovative on-ice promotions which made amateur hockey a profitable event. He was the business manager of the New York Rangers for six years, and was inducted into both the Hockey Hall of Fame and the United States Hockey Hall of Fame, and is a recipient of the Lester Patrick Trophy for building the game in the United States.

== Early life ==
Thomas Finan Lockhart was born on March 21, 1892, in Manhattan, near the area of Eighth Ave and 50th Street. As a youth, he was involved in competitive cycling and distance running. He participated in track and field events with the St. John's Club on 56th Street in Manhattan, and was also interested in boxing, but he never played hockey growing up.

Lockhart began his sports administration career by promoting amateur boxing at the Old Madison Square Garden, and soon became vice-president of the Metropolitan Association of the Amateur Athletic Union (AAU) of the United States, before serving as vice-chairman of USA Boxing for four years. He was asked by the Garden's ownership to manage its amateur hockey games in addition to boxing, and he was successful in making Sunday afternoon amateur hockey profitable, while also serving as vice-president of the Metropolitan Amateur Hockey League (MAHL) for eighteen years, starting in 1934.

== Eastern Hockey League ==
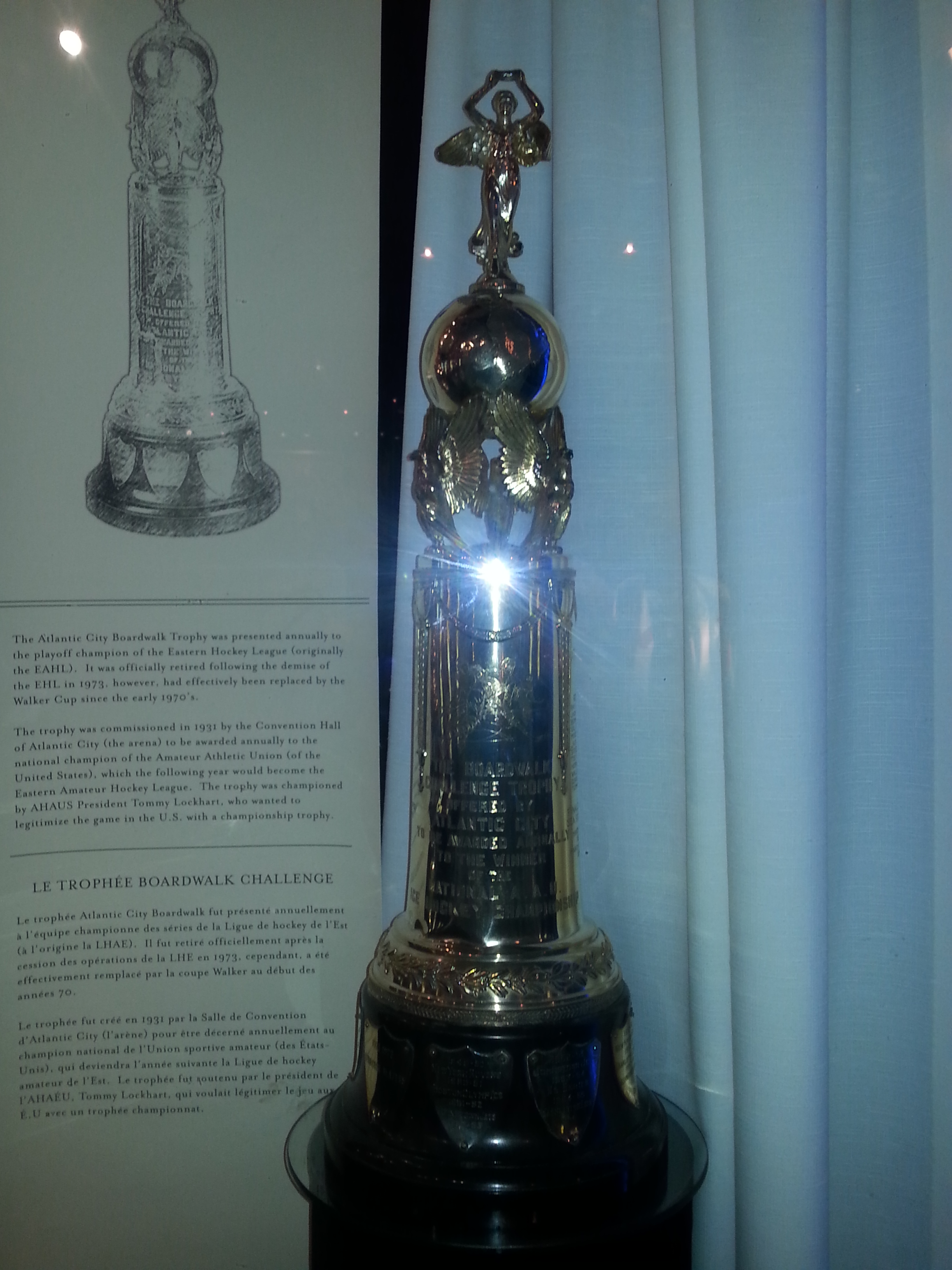
Atlantic City Boardwalk Trophy at the Hockey Hall of Fame

Lockhart looked to increase exposure for the New York amateur teams by seeking a league for them to play in regularly. He traveled to the Penn Athletic Club in Philadelphia for the Tri-State Hockey League annual meeting in 1933. He successfully convinced the league to add his three teams to its schedule, with the promise of revenue from ticket sales at Madison Square Gardens. The group also renamed itself to the Eastern Amateur Hockey League (EAHL) with the addition of teams in a fourth state, and elected Lockhart as its president. Lockhart's creative business sense was evident in scheduling home games for the New York amateur teams. Since the EAHL schedule had 48 games with 24 home games each, and because the Gardens had just 16 Sunday afternoons available for games, he scheduled some of his home games at the visiting team's arena. For the 21 games scheduled between the New York teams, Lockhart made up phony game scores and submitted them to newspapers in lieu of games that were never actually played, and the games were never questioned by the league. To cover up the ruse, Lockhart printed a clause in the 1933 game program which read, "extra games will be played at the assigned practice hours at the Garden and will not be open to the public".

Lockhart's daughter Madeline later served as the league's secretary while her father was president. He defended criticism of the league's amateur status, by saying that its players earned a primary income outside of hockey, despite receiving money for basic living expenses and recreation. He also instituted three separate trophies for competition in the EAHL. The Walker Cup was awarded to the regular season champions of the EAHL. Lockhart purchased it for $500 from a pawnbroker, after it had been previously donated to another hockey competition by Mayor Jimmy Walker in 1926. He later repurchased the same Cup from a pawnbroker for $80, and relayed the story to Dan Parker for coverage in The Fairfield Mirror. He lobbied the AAU to reactivate the Atlantic City Boardwalk Trophy, and awarded it to the playoffs champions of the EAHL. He also recovered the Hamilton B. Wills Trophy from a pawnbroker, and awarded it for winning a challenge series between teams in Canada and the United States.

In the late 1940s, Lockhart made an interlocking schedule between the EAHL and the Quebec Senior Hockey League, which allowed New York fans to see the all-black line of Herb Carnegie and his brothers play with the Sherbrooke team. As the league president, Lockhart suspended a player for life in 1952, after Joe Desson assaulted referee Mickey Slowik on the ice.

In 1954, Lockhart's EAHL became the Eastern Hockey League (EHL) after being dormant for a season. To make the game more exciting, he also introduced a 10-minute overtime period, in an effort to reduce the number of tied games. He later arranged an exhibition schedule for the Soviet Union national ice hockey team to tour the United States in 1963, and for an EHL all-star team coached by Don Hall to travel to the Soviet Union. Lockhart retired as EHL president in the summer of 1972.

== Hockey promotions ==
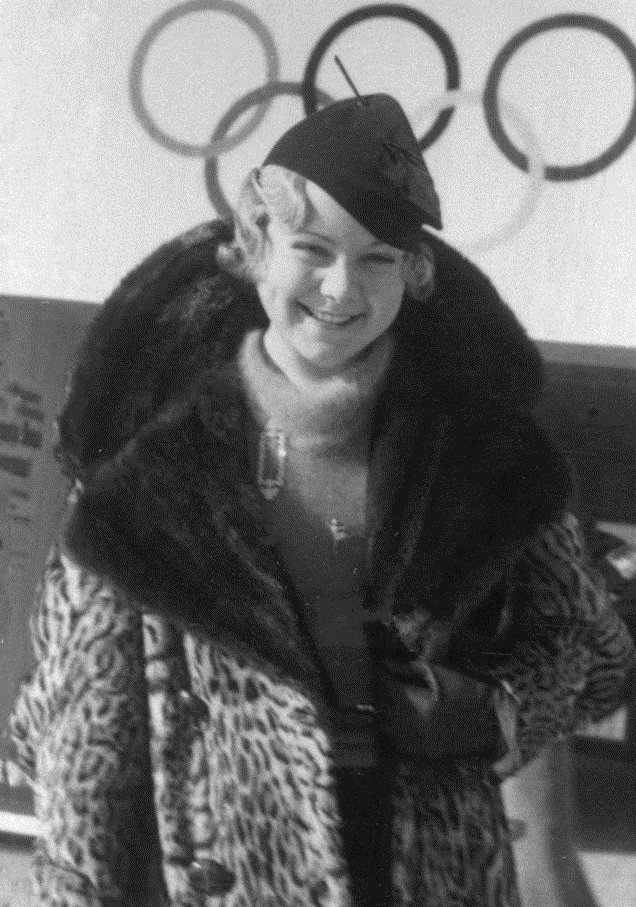
Sonja Henie at the 1936 Winter Olympics

Lockhart was put in charge of managing Sunday afternoon amateur hockey at Madison Square Garden by John Kilpatrick, and made it profitable for its resident teams, the New York Athletic Club, the Crescent Athletic Club, and the St. Nicholas Hockey Club. He promoted hockey through radio from the Gardens, and marketed games to working class people, charging 25-cent ticket prices. He began advance ticket sale promotions, allowing patrons of a game to purchase tickets to the following game, before general public sale, resulting in games sold out a week in advance. Lockhart printed souvenir programs without advertisements, but rather inserted of reading material such as columns on the teams and leagues, in hopes that patrons would take it home to share with others. He made use of his position within the MAHL to promote hockey in the United States, and develop American-born players and referees. He also used MAHL players to create improvised all-star teams when a snow storm prevented a National Hockey League (NHL) match.

Lockhart introduced on-ice entertainment during intermissions, which included racing model aircraft and bicycles around the arena. He also booked figure skating acts Shipstads & Johnson Ice Follies, and Winter Olympics multiple gold medalist Sonja Henie to perform at the Gardens. Lockhart later booked a grizzly bear from the circus which performed on roller skates, to entertain during the first period intermission of a game versus the Hershey Bears. He had arena staff improvise skates to fit size 40 paws, with blades tied to its feet with ropes. The bear's trainer could not skate, and wound up being pulled around the ice while holding onto the animal's leash. Lockhart initially felt the stunt would get him fired, but it turned out to be popular with the spectators. He later replicated the same skating bear act at the Hersheypark Arena, and other arenas in the EAHL.

== New York Rangers ==
Lockhart managed the New York Rovers, a farm team of the New York Rangers, and briefly coached the team during the 1935–36 EAHL season. His roster that season included future NHL referee Bill Chadwick, whom Lockhart later recruited to begin an officiating career. Some notable Rovers players signed by Lockhart include Rudy Pilous, Hank D'Amore, and Chinese-Canadian player Larry Kwong. He later managed the New Haven Ramblers in the American Hockey League, another Rangers farm team. Lockhart was the business manager of the Rangers from 1947 to 1953. He took over for Lester Patrick, and became the first American-born team executive in the NHL, other than a team president or vice-president. Lockhart later managed the Long Island Arena, a practice facility for the Rangers, and home arena for the Rovers.

== United States hockey ==
The EAHL was under the jurisdiction of the Amateur Athletic Union (AAU) of the United States as its governing body until 1937. The AAU issued an ultimatum to the EAHL that year not to have any Canadian-born players in its league. Lockhart then entered into negotiations with the Canadian Amateur Hockey Association (CAHA) represented by Cecil Duncan, George Dudley and W. A. Hewitt, and reached an agreement to transfer a limited number of Canadian players to the league. The EAHL chose to break away from the AAU, similar to how the CAHA broke away from the Amateur Athletic Union of Canada in 1936.

Lockhart saw the need for a national governing body for hockey to efficiently manage the growing game of ice hockey. He founded the Amateur Hockey Association of the United States (AHAUS) in October 1937, and was elected its first president. When he first started operating AHAUS, the paperwork fit into a shoebox in his New York City apartment.

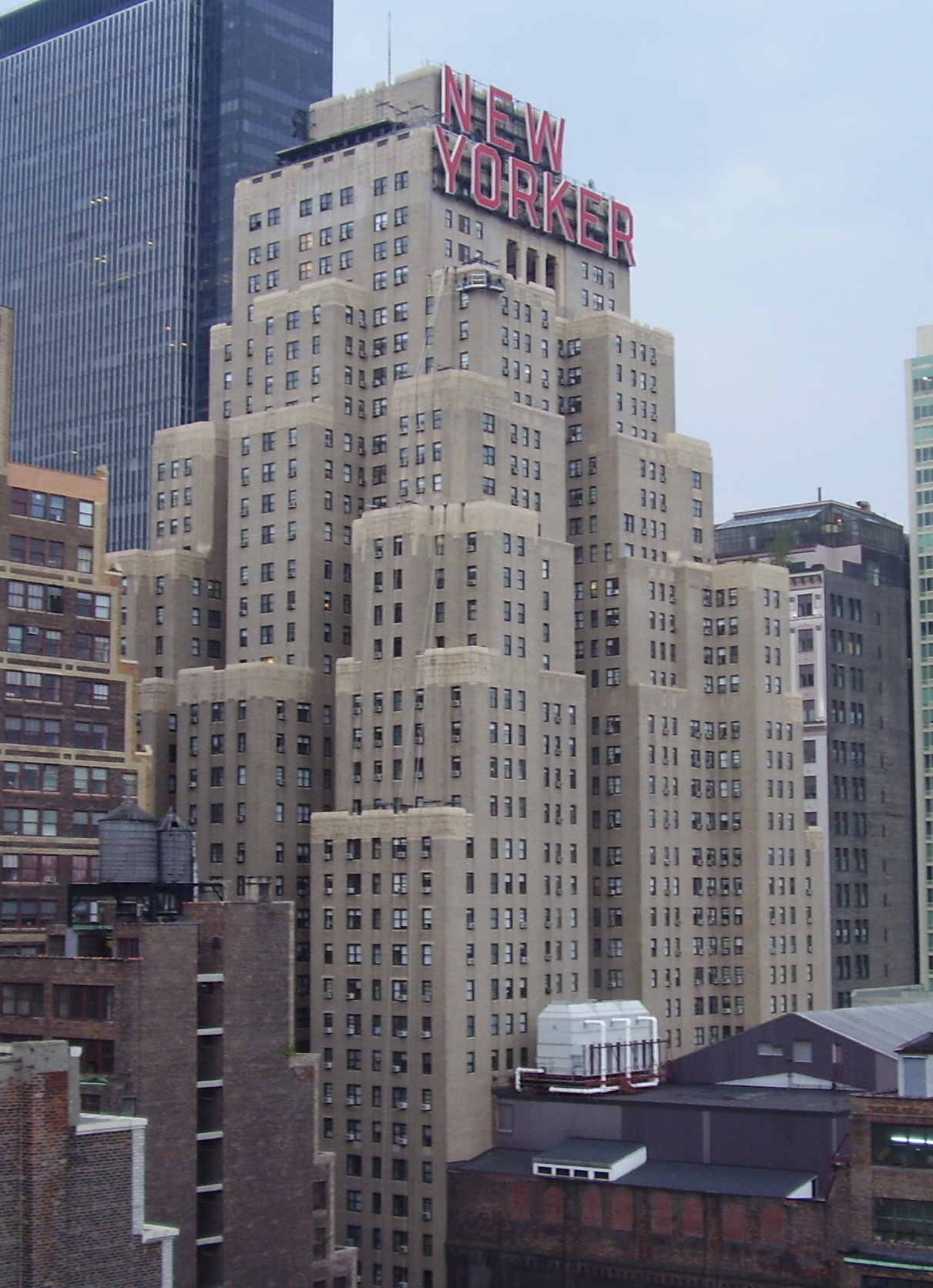
The New Yorker Hotel

In September 1938, Lockhart reached an agreement with W. G. Hardy of the CAHA which regulated international games in North America, set out provisions for transfer of players between the organizations, and recognized of each other's authority. In 1940, he led AHAUS into a union with the CAHA by establishing the International Ice Hockey Association, and served as its vice-president. AHAUS was later admitted as a member of the Ligue Internationale de Hockey sur Glace in 1947.

Lockhart arranged for AHAUS, the CAHA and the International Ice Hockey Federation to hold their annual general meetings concurrently at the New Yorker Hotel in May 1949. He felt that the joint meetings demonstrated the progress made in international ice hockey co-operation. The event was also the first time that the CAHA and AHAUS held a joint annual meeting.

Lockhart established the first national ice hockey tournaments for pre-high school boys in 1949. In 1964, he was at odds with the United States Hockey League and its commissioner Hal Trumble, regarding the perceived lack of support from AHAUS for the league, and the potential expansion of Lockhart's EHL into the Midwestern States.

As the president of AHAUS, Lockhart also participated on the United States Olympic Committee, and was elected to the International Ice Hockey Federation committee in 1965. He announced the establishment of the United States Hockey Hall of Fame on May 19, 1968, to be located in the town of Eveleth, Minnesota. Lockhart was succeeded as president of AHAUS by William Thayer Tutt in 1972.

== Legacy and later life ==
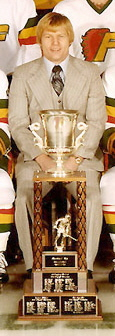
Gregg Pilling sitting behind the Lockhart Cup in a team photo of the 1976–77 Philadelphia Firebirds.

Lockhart was honored by the Ontario Hockey Association in 1948 with its Gold Stick award for distinguished service to hockey. He was elected to the builder category of the Hockey Hall of Fame in 1965. He was a recipient of the Lester Patrick Trophy in 1968, for service to hockey in the United States. He was inducted into the United States Hockey Hall of Fame in the inaugural class of 1973.

The North American Hockey League was one of the successor leagues of the EHL, and named its championship trophy the Lockhart Cup in his honor. He was also an honorary and life member of the Century Road Club Association for his early life work in cycling.

Lockhart died on May 18, 1979, in New York City.

== Coaching record ==
Season-by-season coaching record of Tom Lockhart.

Season	Team	League	Games	Won	Lost	Tied	Points	Pct %	Standing
1935–36	New York Rovers	EAHL	40	16	21	3	35	0.438	4th, EAHL

== Bibliography ==
- Miller, Chuck. From Atlantic City to Toronto: The Boardwalk Trophy and the Eastern Hockey League. Part 1: The Sea Gulls, the Rovers, the Olympics and the Cutters. Vol. 3 (2 ed.). Fort Wayne, Indiana: Hockey Ink!. pp. 1–3.
- Miller, Chuck. From Atlantic City to Toronto: The Boardwalk Trophy and the Eastern Hockey League. Part 2: The Jets, the Comets, Southern Expansion and Well-Worn Knuckles. Vol. 3 (2 ed.). Fort Wayne, Indiana: Hockey Ink!. pp. 4–6.
- Conner, Floyd (2002). Hockey's Most Wanted: The Top 10 Book of Wicked Slapshots, Bruising Goons, and ice oddities (First ed.). Washington DC: Potomac Books Inc. ISBN 1-57488-364-0.
- Diamond, Dan; Duplacey, James (2001). Hockey Stories On and Off the Ice. Kansas City, Missouri: Andrews McMeel Publishing. p. 104. ISBN 0-7407-1903-3.
- Allen, Kevin (2011). Star-Spangled Hockey: Celebrating 75 Years of USA Hockey. Chicago, Illinois: Triumph Books. ISBN 9781633190870.
- Fischler, Stan (2013). We Are the Rangers: The Oral History of the New York Rangers. Chicago, Illinois: Triumph Books. pp. 33–48. ISBN 978-1-60078-867-3.
- Fischler, Stan (2015). The Handy Hockey Answer Book. Visible Ink Press. ISBN 978-1578595686.
