= Canada West University Hockey Awards =

Annual collegiate hockey awards

The winners of Canada West Universities Athletic Association (CWUAA) men's ice hockey awards are selected by the CWUAA head coaches. If applicable, the winners will be the CWUAA nominees for the Canadian Interuniversity Sport (CIS) annual awards.

- CWUAA Outstanding Player of the Year - CWUAA most valuable player and the nominee for the Senator Joseph A. Sullivan Trophy presented to the most outstanding player in Canadian Interuniversity Sport (CIS)
- Mervyn "Red" Dutton Trophy - CWUAA outstanding defenceman and the nominee for the CIS Defenceman of the Year award
- Dave "Sweeney" Schriner Scoring Trophy - Awarded to the leading scorer of the Canada West Hockey conference
- CWUAA Goaltender of the Year - The goaltender selected to the CWUAA All-Star Team shall also be named the Goaltender of the Year
- Adam Kryczka Memorial Trophy - Awarded to the goaltender(s) of the team which has the lowest goals against average during conference
- Dr. W. G. Hardy Trophy - Team award given to the Canada West champion
- University of Alberta Hockey Alumni Trophy - CWUAA Rookie of the Year and the nominee for the Clare Drake Trophy as the CIS Rookie of the Year
- UBC Alumni Trophy - CWUAA most sportsmanlike player of the year and nominee for the CIS R.W. Pugh Award
- CWUAA Student Athlete Community Service Award - Selected player to be the nominee for the CIS Randy Gregg Award
- CWUAA All Star Team - One Goaltender, two Defencemen, and three Forwards
- CWUAA All Rookie Team - Selected players will be the CWUAA nominees for the CIS All-Canadian Rookie Team
- CWUAA Coach of the Year - Best coach as selected by ballot of all CWUAA head coaches
- Fair Play Trophy - Awarded to the CWUAA team with the fewest penalty minutes accumulated during league play
