= W. G. Hardy =

Canadian professor, writer, and ice hockey administrator (1895–1979)

- Born: William George Hardy; February 3, 1895; Peniel, Ontario, Canada
- Died: August 28, 1979 (aged 84); Edmonton, Alberta, Canada
- Education: BA, MA, Ph.D.
- Alma mater: University of Toronto; University of Chicago
- Occupation: Professor of Classics
- Years active: 1922 to 1964
- Employer: University of Alberta
- Known for: Writer and editor; president of the Canadian Authors Association, International Ice Hockey Federation, International Ice Hockey Association, Canadian Amateur Hockey Association and Alberta Amateur Hockey Association; founder of the Western Canada Senior Hockey League
- Notable work: From Sea Unto Sea: Canada — 1850 to 1910, The Greek and Roman World, Alberta: A Natural History, The City of Libertines
- Awards: Order of Canada, Governor General's Academic Medal, Alberta Sports Hall of Fame
- Honours: Dr. W. G. Hardy Trophy; Hardy Cup

William George Hardy CM (February 3, 1895 – August 28, 1979) was a Canadian professor, writer, and ice hockey administrator. He lectured on the Classics at the University of Alberta from 1922 to 1964, and served as president of the Canadian Authors Association. He was an administrator of Canadian and international ice hockey, and served as president of the Alberta Amateur Hockey Association, the Canadian Amateur Hockey Association (CAHA), the International Ice Hockey Association, and the International Ice Hockey Federation.

Hardy was self-taught in Greek and Latin. He paid his way through university by earning scholarships, and won the Governor General's Academic Medal in Classics and English. He earned a Master of Arts at the University of Toronto, and then a Ph.D. at the University of Chicago. He educated about the Classics and world events by radio, and gave 250 talks on CBC Radio. He was critical of progressive education in Alberta, arguing it did not prepare students for university and lacked emphasis on the three Rs. He authored eight novels, six other books, and over 200 short stories published in Maclean's and The Saturday Evening Post. His books told the history of Canada and the Greco-Roman world, and his novels included the fictionalized life and times of Julius Caesar and Ancient Rome. He wrote four plays produced by the Canadian Broadcasting Corporation, was a judge in literary contests, and taught at creative writing workshops.

Hardy coached the Alberta Golden Bears men's ice hockey team, then became president of the Alberta Amateur Hockey Association and established a new playoffs system for senior ice hockey in Western Canada. He was elected to the CAHA executive in 1934, then became its president in 1938. Hardy and George Dudley recommended updates to the definition of an amateur ice hockey player in 1936, to reflect the financial challenges during the Great Depression to have national playoffs and send the Canada men's national ice hockey team to the Ice Hockey World Championships or ice hockey at the Olympic Games. Hardy campaigned to the Canadian public who accepted the changes, despite opposition by the Amateur Athletic Union of Canada. As president of the CAHA, he revised playoffs formats for the Allan Cup and Memorial Cup to become more profitable, and reinvested the money into minor ice hockey in Canada. He negotiated an affiliation agreement with the Amateur Hockey Association of the United States in 1938, which led to the formation of the International Ice Hockey Association in 1940, to oversee hockey in North America and Great Britain. He improved professional–amateur relations with the National Hockey League, and negotiated to reimburse the amateur associations for developing professional players. Hardy founded the Western Canada Senior Hockey League in 1945, which later merged with the Pacific Coast Hockey League. He agreed to a merger of the International Ice Hockey Association with the Ligue Internationale de Hockey sur Glace in 1947, which was renamed to the International Ice Hockey Federation in 1948. He was the first North American to be elected its president, and sought for the International Olympic Committee to recognize the Canadian definition of amateur, and for inclusion of the Soviet Union national ice hockey team at the Winter Olympic Games.

Hardy was invested as a Member of the Order of Canada in 1974 for contributions to education, literature and amateur sports in Canada. He was posthumously inducted into the Alberta Sports Hall of Fame in 1989, and is the namesake of the Dr. W. G. Hardy Trophy for university hockey, and the Hardy Cup for senior hockey.

== Early life and family ==
William George Hardy was born on February 3, 1895, on the family farm in Peniel, Ontario, to parents George William Hardy and Anne Hardy (née White). His parents were of English ancestry, and owned a plot in Mariposa Township at intersection of Ontario Highway 46 and Peniel Road. He grew up as one of seven children, and completed public school at age 10. Hardy stated, "they just let me go at my own speed". He wrote epic poetry by age 12, and taught himself Greek after he had learned Latin. He later attended continuation school in Cannington, Ontario, and then Lindsay Collegiate and Vocational Institute until 1913.

== Education and military service ==
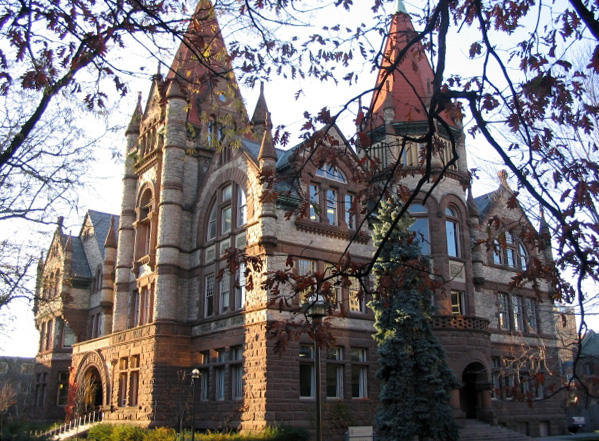
Hardy was a student at Victoria College (pictured) from 1913 to 1917, while studying Classics at the University of Toronto.

Hardy obtained normal school entrance for teaching, then enrolled in Victoria College at the University of Toronto to study mathematics. He switched his studies to the Classics to get a scholarship. In June 1914, he was given a scholarship for passing first year examinations in Classics with honours. He paid his way through university by earning scholarships, and won the Governor General's Academic Medal in Classics and English. He graduated from the University of Toronto with a Bachelor of Arts in 1917. He resided at Burwash Hall during his undergraduate years, and described himself as an excellent athlete who won college medals in hockey, soccer and tennis.

Hardy enlisted in the Canadian Expeditionary Force on April 30, 1917, during World War I. He had previously served two years as a Private in the Canadian Officers' Training Corps, but was rejected to serve in the 109th Battalion due to a heart condition. He subsequently became a Sergeant in the University of Toronto Officer's Company. He was given a medical discharge prior to active service. In a 1979 interview, Hardy stated the preexisting heart condition arose from a college track and field meet.

Hardy was a class lecturer at the University of Toronto from 1918 to 1920. He became the business manager in 1918, of a publication known as The Rebel. He married Llewella May Sonley on September 9, 1919. In 1920, he earned his Master of Arts degree from the University of Toronto, then joined the Classics department at the University of Alberta as a lecturer. He completed a Doctor of Philosophy degree at the University of Chicago in 1922, studying Latin and Greek literature and archeology. Hardy completed his dissertation in 1922 entitled Greek Epigrammatists at Rome in the First Century B.C., which was printed in the Journal of the Graduate School of Arts and Literature in 1923.

== University professor career ==
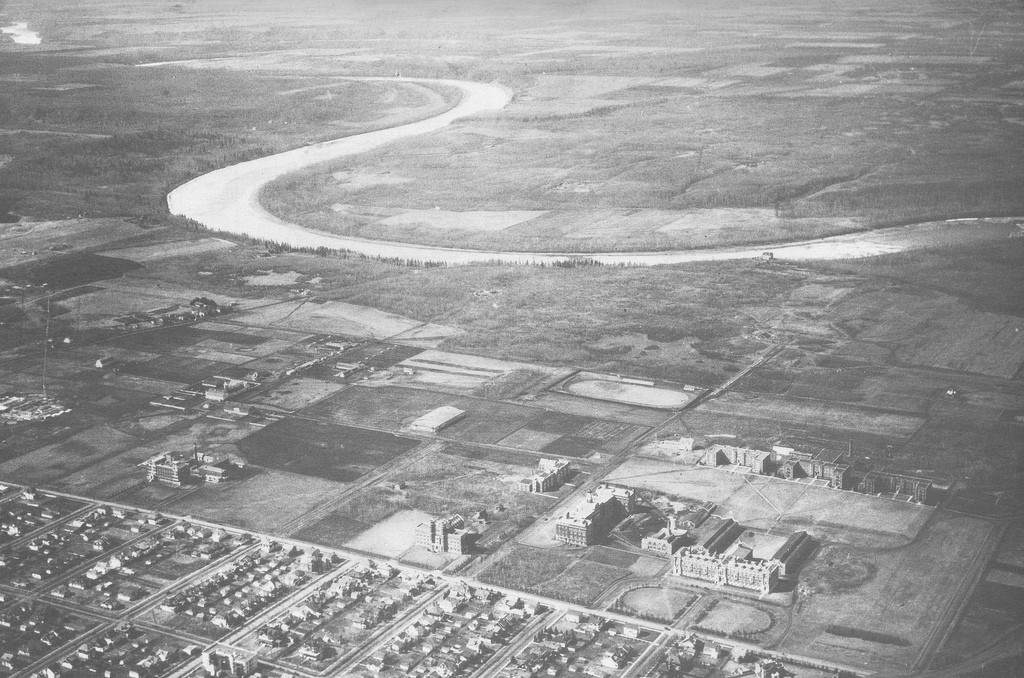
From 1922 to 1964, Hardy was a professor at the University of Alberta (pictured in 1929).

Hardy received his professorship in 1922, then served as head of the Department of Classics at the University of Alberta from 1938 to 1964. He used the airwaves to educate about the Classics and world events, and gave 250 radio talks on CBC Radio. He lectured on the Second Italo-Ethiopian War and its background in 1935, and followed up later with a lecture on the challenges of fascism. Other topics included the Greco-Roman world, and a series of talks about the world's first democracy.

=== Education system criticism ===
In April 1950, Hardy stated that compulsory education in North America has resulted in "a sort of lowest common denominator of dull mediocrity", and "an under-educated and over-opinionated mass of people". He felt university students had weak English language skills, and had not been allowed to study what interested them. He stressed that educated needs to build an understanding of human relationships, instead of being technically trained persons.

In February 1954, Hardy wrote a series of six articles on education in Alberta, where he critiqued the value of education in the current Government of Alberta system. He questioned whether progressive education prepared young people for life, and argued it did not provide the basics such as mathematics, spelling, grammar, writing skills, general knowledge of history and geography. He specifically noted the lack of emphasis on the three Rs.

Hardy felt that the increase in class sizes and the "watered-down lessons" led to students being less interested in their studies. He criticized the system for being designed to make it easier to pass, as a result of parents not wanting to see their child fail when others succeeded. He was critical of group projects geared towards the lowest common denominator, students developing poor thinking and working habits, and teachers being overwhelmed by the number of students. He felt that learning how to get along with other people was best achieved interacting with peers on the playground rather than in the classroom. He stated that children needed to learn facts and history about the world, to be able to interpret those facts as they grow in mental capacity. He stressed that proper learning was hard work, and the need for memorization skills in children when the ability for memory power was greatest. He noted that the progressive system admitted to not providing for the child with intellectual giftedness, and was critical of the reduced requirements for entry into teacher's college in Alberta.

The series of articles titled Education in Alberta, were later printed in a booklet and made available by newspaper publishers in Alberta.

== Hockey career ==
=== Early hockey career in Alberta ===
Hardy coached the Alberta Golden Bears men's ice hockey team from 1922 to 1926. He played a leading role in getting the first ice hockey rink built at the University of Alberta campus in 1927. He served as president of the Alberta Amateur Hockey Association (AAHA) from 1931 to 1933, and was appointed to the board of governors for the Alberta branch of the Amateur Athletic Union of Canada (AAU of C). During his tenure as president, the AAHA began hockey schools for its coaches and referees. He supported expanding the playoffs for the intermediate division in senior ice hockey, even though Canada did not yet have national playoffs for that division. At the AAU of C meeting in April 1933, he submitted a motion to allow the reinstatement of former professionals as amateurs, after a period of not playing professionally. The AAHA meeting in November 1933, reported the largest bank balance at end of year since the founding of the AAHA 26 years prior. Hardy submitted a resolution to have the AAU of C request to the 1936 Summer Olympics be taken away from Berlin, due to Germany banning Jewish athletes. He was succeeded as president by Lance Morgan, and remained on the AAHA executive as past-president, representing the provincial body at national meetings.

=== Canadian Amateur Hockey Association ===
==== Second vice-president ====
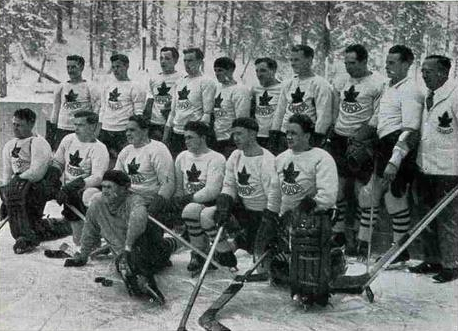
Hardy pushed for a new definition of amateur, in the wake of Canada not winning the gold medal in ice hockey at the 1936 Winter Olympics hosted in Garmisch-Partenkirchen.

Hardy was elected second vice-president of the Canadian Amateur Hockey Association (CAHA) on April 4, 1934. He was re-elected by acclamation on April 13, 1935, and served as chairman of the resolutions committee. He also continued to serve on the AAHA executive, being re-elected in 1934, and 1935.

The CAHA decided in 1935 to appoint a special committee to study the definition of amateur and look into updating its wording to suit hockey in Canada. The special committee included Hardy, Cecil Duncan, George Dudley and Clarence Campbell. The committee studied the issues encountered when the Halifax Wolverines team which won the 1935 Allan Cup, was unable to represent the Canada men's national ice hockey team in ice hockey at the 1936 Winter Olympics due to financial issues related to amateur eligibility for the games.

Hardy was in charge of CAHA playoffs for Western Canada, which included the Allan Cup for the senior ice hockey divisions, and the Memorial Cup for the junior ice hockey divisions. In the 1936 Allan Cup playoffs, he ruled against including the Port Arthur Bearcats. He stated it was too late to redraft the schedules, since the team had been overseas representing the Canada at the 1936 Winter Olympics instead of the Halifax Wolverines.

Hardy and Dudley presented the special committee's report on amateur status at the CAHA general meeting in April 1936, which came in the wake of Canada being beaten by the Great Britain men's national ice hockey team for the gold medal at the 1936 Winter Olympics. They proposed four points to change the existing AAU of C definition.

The "four points" were:

1. Hockey players may capitalize on their ability as hockey players for the purpose of obtaining legitimate employment.
2. Hockey players may accept from their clubs or employers payment for time lost, from work while competing on behalf of their clubs. They will not however, be allowed to hold "shadow" jobs under the clause.
3. Amateur hockey teams may play exhibition games against professional teams under such conditions as may be laid down by the individual branches of the CAHA.
4. Professionals in another sport will be allowed to play under the CAHA jurisdiction as amateurs.

In presenting the reforms, Hardy stated, "it is time that we face present day realities as they exist in hockey across the country". The proposals stood to sever relations with the AAU of C as its governing body, and the CAHA's participation in international events. The Winnipeg Tribune reported that when a vote came, the "old guard" would lose against updating the definition of an amateur. The four points were discussed at a special meeting with W. A. Fry, the president of the AAU of C. Fry stated that the decision was "the most important matter ever to come before an amateur body in Canada". He sympathized with the situation since was a former CAHA president, but he did not support the changes. The CAHA voted to pass the resolution to adopt the new definition of amateur, and awaited a vote by the AAU of C on whether it would be accepted.

==== First vice-president ====
Hardy lengthened playoff series for the Allan Cup (trophy pictured) to a best-of-seven format, and began the practice of playing all of the games in a series in one location to increase profits.

Hardy was elected first vice-president of the CAHA on May 6, 1936. He was delegated to assist Fry in conducting a mail-in vote on the CAHA proposals, and to draft a letter to send to AAU of C delegates. Fry published a letter to the CAHA in his Dunnville Chronicle newspaper that defended the old definition of amateur, and said that no mail-in vote would be held, and deferred the issue to the AAU of C general meeting in November 1936. Hardy responded by asserting that Fry broke a promise to the CAHA, and maintained that the CAHA would go ahead with its plan, regardless of any AAU of C vote.

Hardy publicized the CAHA ambitions and published the article "Should We Revise Our Amateur Laws?" in Maclean's on November 1, 1936. He argued for updating the definition of amateur, when it was commonly accepted to bend the rules in hockey. He felt that the AAU of C was hypocritical for classifying cricket, soccer, and tennis as pastime sports where athletes may compete with or against professionals and still be called amateurs. He sought for these inconsistencies with respect to professionals and amateurs should be "ironed out and a common-sense view be taken of the situation". He further stated that the old definition of amateur came "from the days when only gentlemen with independent means were supposed to engage in sport"; and that in the era of the Great Depression, it was justified that a hockey player be allowed legitimate employment in sport and be compensated for work lost while away at playoffs or representing his country at international events.

The amateur issue achieved significant press coverage by November 1936. Canadian journalist Scott Young wrote that public perception was against the AAU of C definition, and that Canadians were in favour of amateurs being compensated for travel, which was perceived as a reason for Canada not winning the gold medal in ice hockey at the 1936 Winter Olympics. Hardy and Dudley presented their arguments at the AAU of C general meeting, and reiterated that the CAHA would not back down since the changes were in the best interests of hockey in Canada. Hardy felt that defending the interests of players in Canada was more important than maintaining international relations. The AAU of C voted and approved exhibition games between amateurs and professionals, but rejected the other three points.

The status of the alliance between the CAHA and the AAU of C was left in limbo and unclear. Hardy remained open to a relationship with the AAU of C, and denied a report in The Gazette that the CAHA had formally severed ties. In March 1937, the Amateur Athletic Union of the United States terminated its affiliation agreement with the CAHA due to the split with the AAU of C. Hardy was not deterred since it meant fewer players going to the United States and depleting rosters in Canada.

In other business, Hardy defended the decision to reduce the expenses covered for delegates to attend the CAHA meeting, and spend the money instead on grants to the provincial branches to promote minor ice hockey, junior ice hockey, and expenses for the Canadian national team at the Olympics. He anticipated that eastern Canadian teams may start an intermediate level championship, and he was re-elected to the AAHA executive.

Hardy was re-elected first vice-president of the CAHA, on April 20, 1937, and supervised playoffs schedules for Western Canada. The CAHA profited C$17,000 from the 1938 playoffs. National registrations had increased 4,500 players in three seasons, which justified giving the grants to promote minor ice hockey. By 1938, profits had improved the financial reserves of the CAHA from $5,000 to $50,000.

In February 1938, National Hockey League (NHL) president Frank Calder terminated the working agreement with the CAHA, after a player suspended by the NHL was registered by a CAHA team. Hardy met with Calder and felt that issues were worked out, but Calder told NHL teams that they could approach any junior player with a contract offer. Hardy then set up a committee including himself, Dudley and W. A. Hewitt to represent the CAHA at a meeting with the NHL to discuss the issues.

==== President ====
===== First term =====
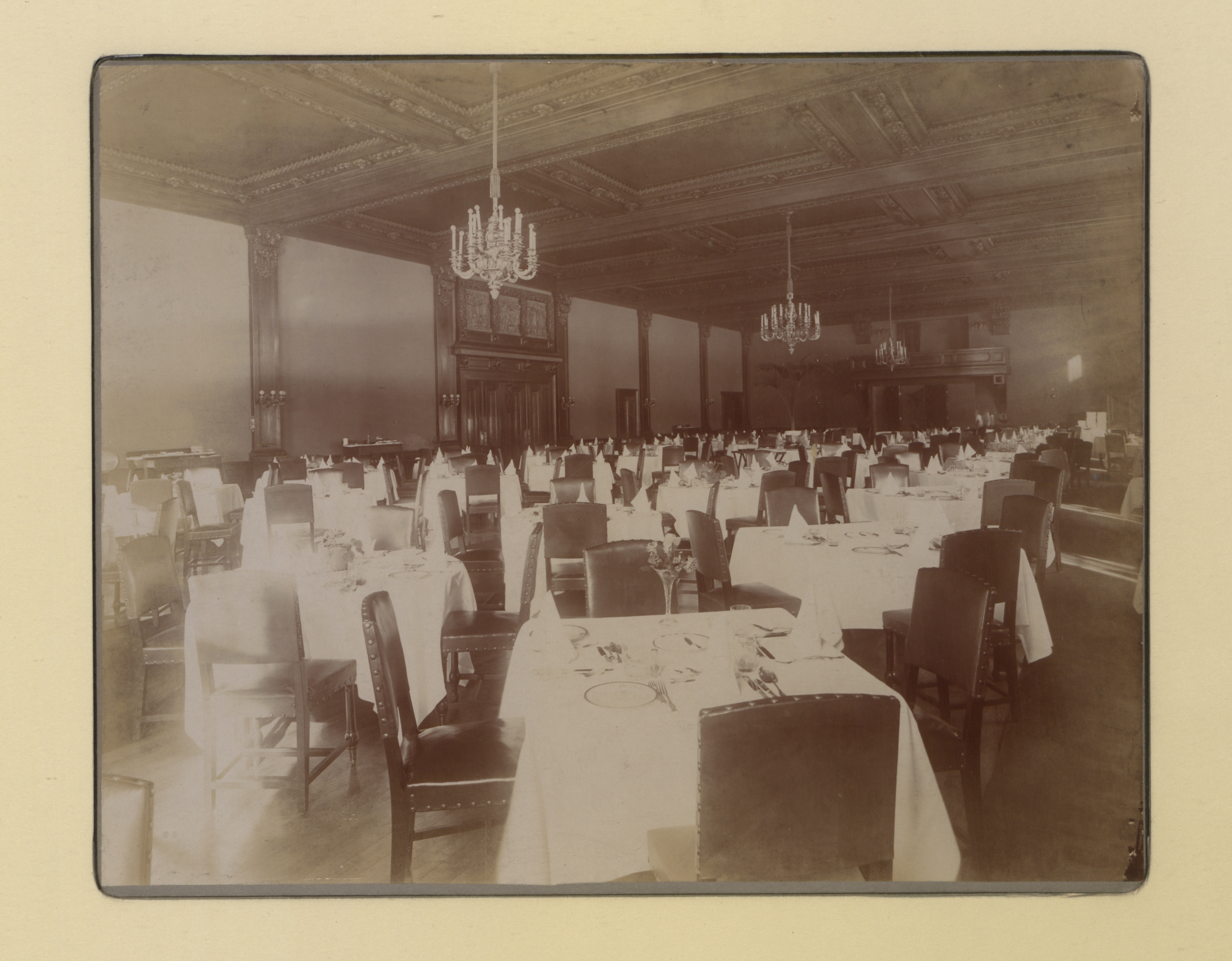
Hardy presided over the CAHA's silver jubilee in 1939, hosted at the Royal Alexandra Hotel (drawing room pictured) in Winnipeg.

Hardy was elected president of the CAHA on April 18, 1938, succeeding Cecil Duncan. Hardy reached a new working agreement with the NHL in August 1938. The CAHA agreed not to allow international transfers for players on NHL reserve lists, and the NHL agreed not to sign any junior players without permission. It also included provisions against the exodus of Canadian players to American clubs, and stipulated that both organizations use the same playing rules, and recognize each other's suspensions. Hardy then represented the CAHA at the joint rules committee to draft uniform rules with the NHL.

Hardy set out to negotiate a working agreement with the Amateur Hockey Association of the United States (AHAUS), which had been founded in 1937 by Tommy Lockhart as a new governing body for ice hockey in the United States. Hardy reached a two-year agreement with AHAUS in September 1938. It regulated games played between amateur teams in Canada and the United States, set out provisions for transfers from one organization to the other, and recognized each other's suspensions and authority. Hardy cautioned Canadians against signing contracts with the Tropical Hockey League based in Miami, since the league was not affiliated with AHAUS.

In February 1939, the Amateur Athletic Union of the United States responded to the CAHA affiliation with AHAUS by protesting to the Ligue Internationale de Hockey sur Glace (LIHG). The Amateur Athletic Union did not recognize the authority of AHAUS within the United States, and disagreed any fellow LIHG members entering into agreements with the new governing body. Hardy stated that the CAHA would stay true to the agreement with AHAUS, which he referred to as the most comprehensive ice hockey governing body in the United States. His decision potentially meant that the CAHA would lose its membership in the LIHG, and not be permitted to compete at the Ice Hockey World Championships or in ice hockey at the Olympic Games.

Hardy met with officials from the AAHA and the Saskatchewan Amateur Hockey Association in February 1939, to discuss the cost of developing players lost to professional teams. They agreed to propose a draft fee when a CAHA player signed an NHL contract to offset financial losses. In the same month, Hardy negotiated to include the British Ice Hockey Association (BIHA) into the existing agreement with AHAUS to regulate imported players. The announcement upheld his previous statement that anyone who had played with the BIHA would need to seek a proper transfer back to Canada, or face suspension.

In other business, Hardy announced more grants to provincial branches to promote minor ice hockey, he arranged the Western intermediate senior playoffs, and spoke on national radio about developments in the status of amateur sport in Canada.

Hardy's first term as president ended with the CAHA's silver jubilee celebrations. He appointed Claude C. Robinson to oversee the event in Winnipeg, to recognize the contributions of the Manitoba Amateur Hockey Association (MAHA) in starting the CAHA. The gala was hosted at the Royal Alexandra Hotel on April 11, 1939. Hardy acknowledged the guidance of Robinson as a founding father of the CAHA in his opening remarks, and stated that "we must have the vision of today, also of the future, and also of the past". He felt the future goals of the CAHA should be, "the development of youths who will fight hard, but fight clean".

===== Second term =====
Hardy operated normal playoff schedules during World War II for the Allan Cup and Memorial Cup (trophy pictured) to maintain public morale, and approved a plan which gave control of the Eastern Canada playoffs to a subcommittee of the CAHA.

Hardy was re-elected president of the CAHA on April 12, 1939. He continued the affiliation with AHAUS, in objection to the protest by the Amateur Athletic Union of the United States. He received a letter from LIHG president Paul Loicq which permitted continued negotiations with AHAUS. Hardy reported that the intermediate playoffs which he started in Western Canada were becoming profitable. He extended more grants to promote minor ice hockey within Canada, and to the Quebec Amateur Hockey Association (QAHA) to translate playing rules into the French language. The CAHA executive felt it was in a good financial situation and felt it appropriate to help the Canadian Olympic Association. Hardy announced a grant of $3000 towards travel expenses for teams to the 1940 Winter Olympics. He explained CAHA financial policy was to keep enough funds at hand in case of years with deficits, to take care of playoffs travel expenses for its teams, to pay administration costs, and to reinvest profits into youth hockey for the future.

The CAHA proposed having junior hockey contracts which tied a player to a team, as a means to prevent rosters being raided by professional teams, and to protect the junior teams against not being reimbursed for developing the player. The proposed contract required a $500 release fee to be paid when a player signed by any professional club. Hardy said the contracts would put the CAHA in a good legal position with respect to the relationship with its players. He also supported refusing transfers for players who had been offered a reasonable contract of $75 to $125 per month. In June 1939, the CAHA formally notified the NHL of the request for development fees after the existing deal expired in 1940.

When World War II began, the Government of Canada wanted sports to continue, and maintain morale of the people during war time. Hardy announced that the CAHA would operate its normal schedule and playoffs for the Allan Cup and Memorial Cup, and stated that the CAHA would provide any services needed. The residency rule was waived for those engaged in military service, and military hockey teams became eligible for the Allan Cup playoffs. The CAHA welcomed any professional players who entered military service with consent of the NHL, and drafted plans to replace players lost to military service. Hardy asked that the provincial hockey associations incorporate military teams into schedules, and assist in running leagues for garrison units.

At the general meeting in 1940, Hardy stated a desire to continue the existing agreement with the NHL, as long as professional teams did not sign junior-aged players. Teams in the CAHA were given the option of making player contracts for the upcoming season. The AAU of C decided in 1938 to adopt the definition of amateur as laid out by the respective world governing body of each sport as recognized by the International Olympic Committee (IOC). The CAHA declined the request from the AAU of C to re-affiliate. The CAHA stance on amateurs was solidified, and its constitution was updated to define an amateur player as one who, "either has not engaged or is not engaged in organized professional hockey".

==== Past-president ====
George Dudley succeeded Hardy as president of the CAHA in April 1940. Hardy served as past-president until 1942, and was re-elected to the AAHA executive. He was chairman of the CAHA's player committee, which considered whether permission could be given for the NHL to sign juniors. He remained in charge of the Western Canada playoffs for the CAHA; and he and Dudley met with QAHA officials in 1941, to approve a plan which gave control of the Eastern Canada playoffs for the Allan Cup and Memorial Cup to a subcommittee of the CAHA.

=== International Ice Hockey Association ===
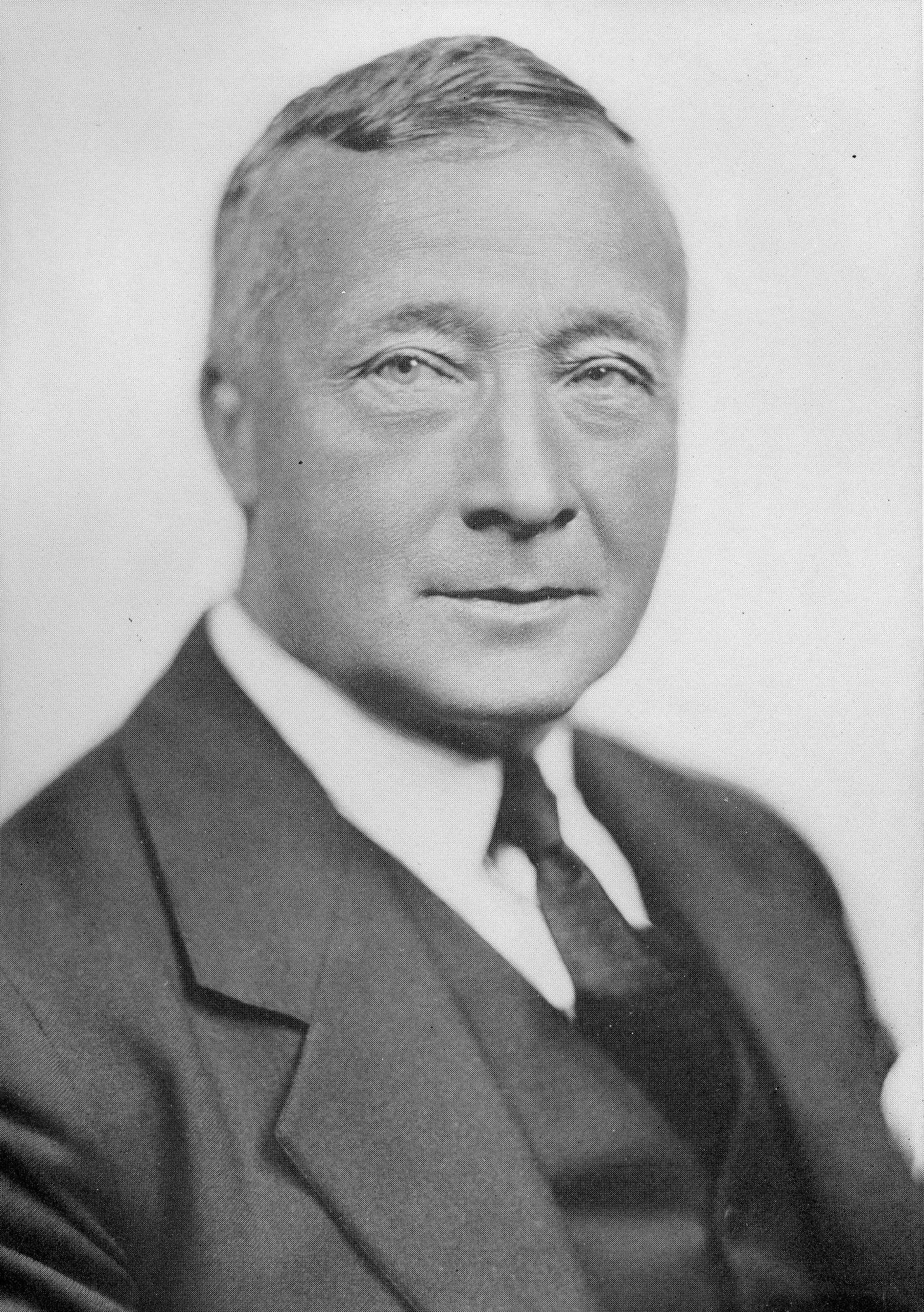
Hardy negotiated several professional–amateur agreements with NHL president Frank Calder (pictured), on behalf of the CAHA and the International Ice Hockey Association.

==== Foundation of the association ====
On April 15, 1940, in Montreal, the CAHA and AHAUS agreed to form a new governing body known tentatively as the International Ice Hockey League, and invited the BIHA to join. Hardy who was also the CAHA president, stated that "the purpose of the new association is to promote the game of hockey among the three Anglo-Saxon nations". The new body became known as the International Ice Hockey Association, and Hardy as its president from 1940 to 1947. Lockhart from AHAUS was named first vice-president, and the BIHA was asked to nominate the second vice-president position.

Hardy explained the International Ice Hockey Association as a means of shifting the control of world hockey from Belgium to Canada, "where it rightfully belonged". He also noted the inactivity of the LIHG resulting from World War II. He sought for acceptance by the IOC on terms acceptable to the CAHA. A constitution for the new association was delegated to a committee including future CAHA presidents Hanson Dowell and W. B. George, and MAHA president Vic Johnson. The constitution stated that the associations president must be an executive officer or a past-president of the CAHA. The CAHA gave $500 to the association, and an honorarium to Hardy for expenses.

==== Professional–amateur relations ====
Amateur and junior hockey teams in Canada were upset about losing players to professional leagues without compensation, and Hardy set about to negotiate reimbursement of the Canadian teams when a player became professional. The CAHA had introduced player contracts for the 1940–41 season, with the goal to keep junior-aged and amateur players under service in Canada instead of leaving for professional leagues.

In September 1940, Hardy announced a one-year agreement was reached with the NHL to reimburse the amateur associations, which included $250 for signing an amateur and another $250 if the amateur played in the NHL. The new professional-amateur agreement was signed by Calder on behalf of the NHL in October 1940, and also applied to leagues in the BIHA and the Eastern Amateur Hockey League in the United States. The distribution of the development funds from the NHL was based on the service time the amateur had with each respective club, and was overseen by Hardy and Frank Sargent. The agreement included allowing the NHL to sign a limited number of junior age players.

Hardy decided on disputes of players becoming professionals, and reinstatements as amateurs. He committed to decide on all application within 15 days to expedite transfers and reinstatements due to wartime enlistments and travel restrictions. He stated, "we believe that the movement between professional and amateur ranks should be made as easy as possible", which included former professionals being welcomed back in amateur. By January 1941, both Hardy and Calder agreed that amateur and professional organizations were at a "perfect understanding" and were co-operating closely.

By 1942, the agreement had brought in $17,241 in development fees to junior teams. Demand for junior-aged players during the 1941–42 NHL season was higher due to war-time travel restrictions on older players. Calder reported there was a general agreement with the amateur leagues that a junior-aged player should be able to determine his own financial future due to the war.

In 1943, Hardy recommended adjustments in amateur payments for players becoming professional, since many later enlisted shortly after signing a contract. He felt that under normal circumstances, junior-aged players should not be signed to professional contracts. He negotiated wartime measures with the NHL, without opposition being raised by presidents of the provincial associations. The Pacific Coast Hockey League began in 1944, and competed for junior-aged players. Hardy ruled that since the league operated under affiliation with AHAUS, the existing international transfer rules and professional–amateur agreement would apply to the new league.

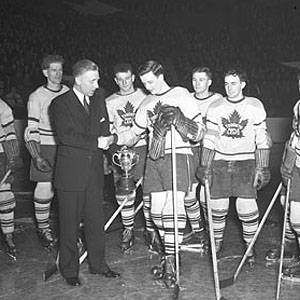
Hardy was rumoured in 1943 and 1944 as a replacement for Red Dutton (pictured presenting trophy), who had been acting as NHL president since the death of Calder in 1943.

In April 1943, The Canadian Press reported that Hardy was rumoured to be appointed president of the NHL, to replace Red Dutton who had been acting president since the death of Calder in 1943. Hardy stated that he had not been formally approached by the NHL. In October 1944, Lester Patrick sponsored Hardy to be president. "He is an ideal man for the job. He is temperamentally suited and has an excellent record as an executive of the CAHA". Patrick credited Hardy for being largely responsible for the current working agreement between the NHL and amateur associations. Hardy "warmly appreciated the nice things Lester Patrick" said, but declined further comment.

In April 1945, Hardy was re-elected president of the International Ice Hockey Association. By 1946, the professional–amateur agreement provided more than $45,000 in development fees. The association and the NHL agreed to enforce suspensions for players not fulfilling a tryout contract. Hardy then declined transfers to those under such a contract.

In May 1946, the NHL proposed a flat payment of $20,000 to cover all players being signed to professional contracts, whereas the CAHA requested $2,000 for any player remaining in the NHL for more than a year. Hardy felt the CAHA was at a disadvantage to press too hard, and wanted to maintain good relations with the NHL and AHAUS. The flat rate offer was later accepted with the stipulation that a junior-aged player could sign a contract at age 16, but not play professional until age 18.

In January 1947, the CAHA and AHAUS disagreed over a $100 transfer fee requested for players going to the United States. Lockhart refused the fee, stating the CAHA had no authority to make that request. He also threatened to resign as vice-president and withdraw AHAUS from the association. Several players had left Canada without proper documentation, but Hardy ultimately allowed the players to remain in the United States.

==== World hockey relations ====
At the 1944 CAHA general meeting in Montreal, a motion was passed to sever relations with the LIHG. Another a motion of confidence was passed in the International Ice Hockey Association, and closer relationships between the CAHA, AHAUS and the BIHA.

In April 1945, Hardy envisioned an amateur hockey World Series after World War II, involving teams from Canada, the United States, England and Scotland. The proposed series would be an annual event between the North American and European champion to begin in 1947 or 1948.

Hardy expected hockey to grow after the war, and said proper rules had been established to limited transfers and prevent raiding of Canadian rosters. He expected a large number of Canadian soldiers stationed in Europe to remain there playing hockey. Post-war plans were discussed on how to co-ordinate classification of clubs for international competition. In May 1946, the Swedish Ice Hockey Association and French Ice Hockey Federation expressed interest in joining the association.

==== Merger with the LIHG ====
The association met in August 1946 in New York City, along with guests from the Scottish Ice Hockey Association, French and Swedish associations. At the meeting, it was agreed to propose a merger with the LIHG to oversee international ice hockey. A proposal would also be submitted for the Ice Hockey World Championships to alternate between Europe and North America, with the Olympic hockey tournaments played under the same rules as the CAHA and the NHL. Hardy's resolution from 1941 stated the merger was acceptable if the CAHA definition of amateur was approved, the membership and voting system was acceptable to the CAHA, and that AHAUS be admitted as a member to the merged organization. The CAHA sought to have Hardy nominated as vice-president of the new governing body, and Dudley as its secretary.

The CAHA attended the LIHG meeting during the 1947 Ice Hockey World Championships in Prague, and pushed for the definition of amateur to be anyone not actively engaged in professional sport. The LIHG agreed to a merger where the presidency would alternate between North America and Europe every three years, and recognized AHAUS as the governing body of hockey in the United States. Since both the CAHA and AHAUS were now members, LIHG regulations prevented roster raids between the countries. A decision on increased voting power for the CAHA was deferred, and the CAHA was permitted to have its own definition of amateur as long as teams at the Olympic games adhered to existing LIHG rules. Hardy agreed to the merger and accepted the vice-presidency of the LIHG. The association was dissolved on July 1, 1947.

=== Ligue Internationale de Hockey sur Glace ===
The first meeting of the recently elected LIHG executive took place in Quebec City in May 1947, concurrently with the CAHA general meeting. Hardy announced that the BIHA and the Scottish Ice Hockey Association had set aside their differences, with the possibility of the two groups merging. The CAHA approved a resolution to become a member of the LIHG as of July 1, 1947. Incoming CAHA president Al Pickard stated that the CAHA and AHAUS would operate with complete autonomy under the structure of the agreement to join the LIHG.

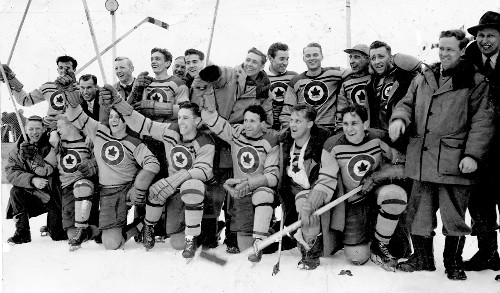
The Ottawa RCAF Flyers team (pictured) was the subject of Hardy's article "Fiasco on Ice" in Maclean's that argued against the definition of amateur for ice hockey at the 1948 Winter Olympics.

Hardy felt the CAHA had a tough decision ahead as to whether it could form strong enough teams for international competition that held true to the Olympic Oath. He stated that automatically sending the reigning Allan Cup champion would end, as they were not amateur by Olympic standards. The LIHG decided in 1947, that it supported the IOC interpretation of amateur as defined by Avery Brundage. The definition read, "an amateur is one whose connection with sport is and always has been solely for pleasure and for the physical, mental and social benefits he derives therefrom and to whom sport is nothing more than recreation without material gain of any kind, direct or indirect".

In response to the IOC decision, Hardy wrote the article "Fiasco on Ice", published in Maclean's on February 1, 1948. He argued that the IOC definition of amateur was outdated, and that preventing athletes from receiving reimbursement for wages lost while playing a sport is undemocratic since it limited amateur competition in team sport to the rich who could pay their own way. The IOC definition of amateur excluded those from hockey who were professionals in another sport, any hockey player who received skates or other equipment, and did not allow for reimbursement of wages lost while at competitions. Hardy argued for what he called "a sensible and modern definition of amateurism" which was "one to whom the sport concerned is not his sole or chief means of livelihood". The CAHA's best amateur players did not qualify for the Olympic definition of an amateur, and the CAHA accepted the offer of the Royal Canadian Air Force (RCAF), to send the Ottawa RCAF Flyers team fortified with some reserves. Despite Hardy's concerns, the Ottawa RCAF Flyers won the gold medal in ice hockey at the 1948 Winter Olympics.

=== International Ice Hockey Federation ===
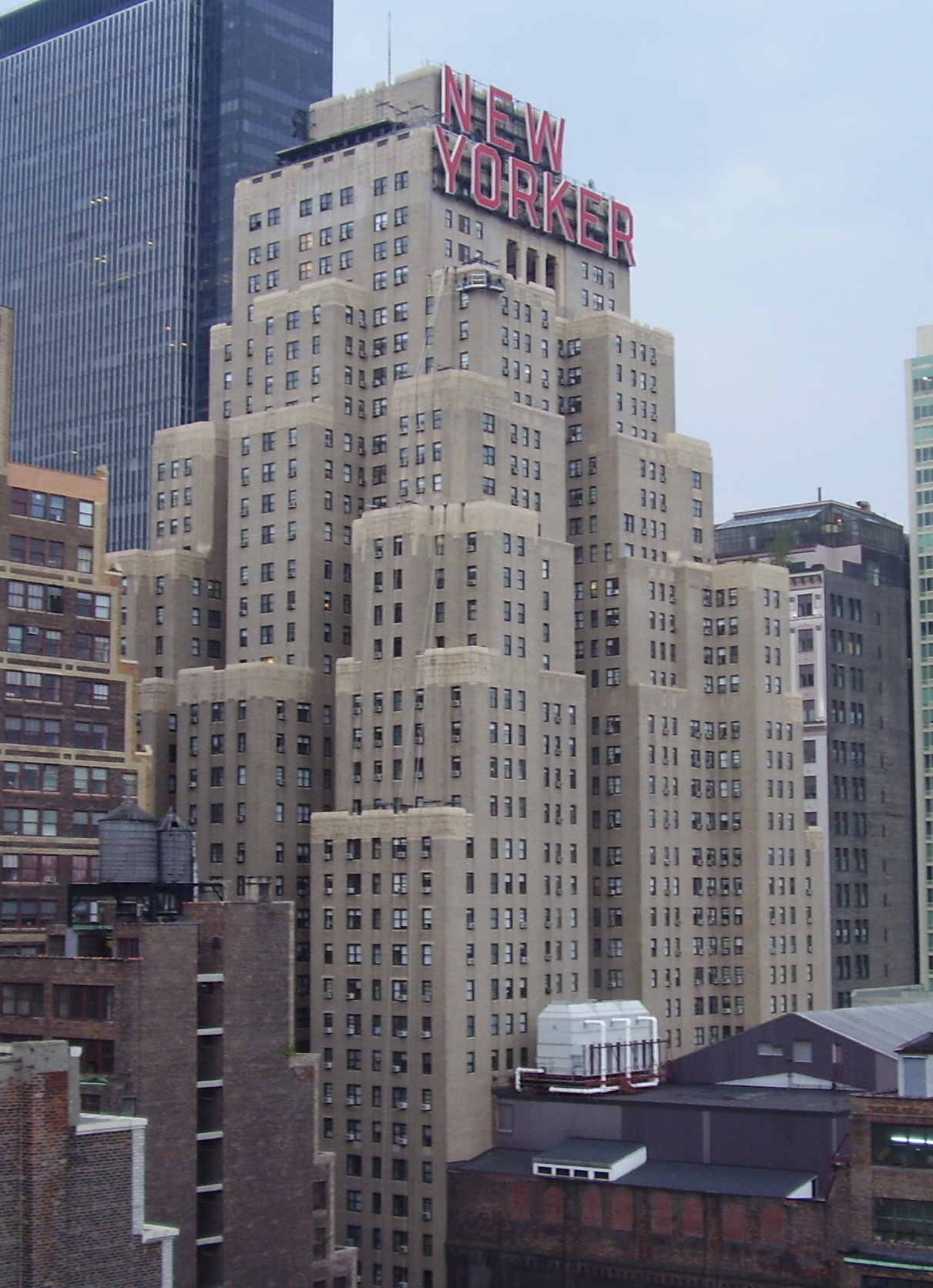
The New Yorker Hotel (pictured) hosted the 1949 general meetings of the IIHF, CAHA and AHAUS concurrently in May 1949.

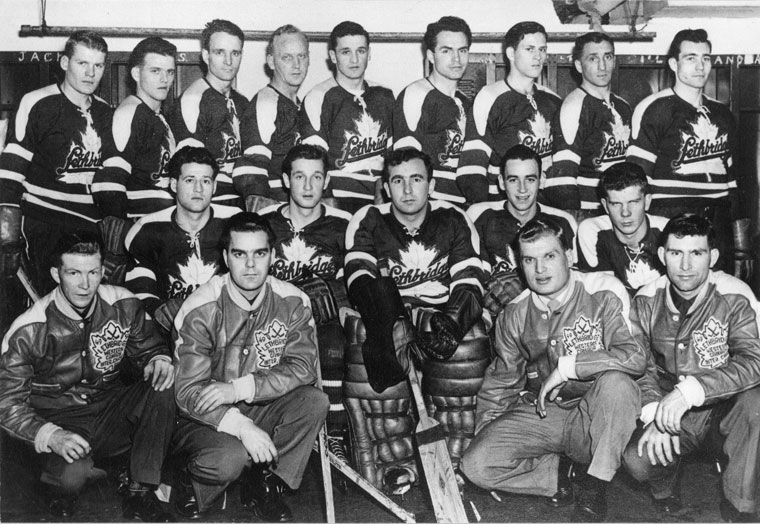
The Lethbridge Maple Leafs (team pictured) played in the Western Canada Senior Hockey League organized by Hardy, and won the 1951 Ice Hockey World Championship while he was IIHF president.

The LIHG was renamed the International Ice Hockey Federation (IIHF) in 1948. Hardy was elected president of the IIHF at the July 1948 congress held in Zürich. He succeeded Fritz Kraatz who became the vice-president. Hardy was the first North American to be elected president of the IIHF. He considered the position to be recognition of Canada's contribution to hockey, and hoped for a World Championship to be hosted in Canada by 1950.

Hardy anticipated that once post-war travel restrictions were lifted, European teams would rank favourably with Canadian teams, and thought a European country would be able to win the World Championship. The IIHF allowed for any of its member countries to send a team to the 1949 Ice Hockey World Championships, instead of limiting the event to eight teams. The championships were hosted in Stockholm, with the gold medal won by the Czechoslovakia men's national ice hockey team.

In May 1949, the IIHF, CAHA and AHAUS hosted their annual meetings concurrently at the New Yorker Hotel. At the 1949 meeting, the North American professional and amateur leagues agreed to a campaign on selling hockey to the Canadian and American public. A committee composed of the NHL president Clarence Campbell, CAHA president Pickard, and IIHF president Hardy, was made to "plan and develop a positive statement of hockey objectives for a vigorous presentation to the public". The campaign was in response to alleged exploitation of young hockey players by professional teams.

The 1950 Ice Hockey World Championships were played in London. The reigning champion Czechoslovakia, did not participate in protest of two radio broadcasters who were denied travel visas. Czechoslovakia also feared losing players, due to recent defection of Jaroslav Drobný. Despite the politics, Hardy stressed that the event was "to promote international amity". Canada won the gold medal at the 1950 championships, and Hardy credited the Sweden men's national ice hockey team for great improvements reflecting the growth of the game in Sweden.

The IOC rejected a May 1950 proposal to allow each individual sports federation to determine its own respective definition of amateur, but agreed to an Olympic ice hockey tournament in 1952 using the IOC definition of amateur. Hardy stated that the IIHF had no intention of negotiating for inclusion in the 1952 Winter Olympics under the terms announced by the IOC, and asserted that the IIHF had the right to decide on its definition of amateur.

In November 1950, the Lethbridge Maple Leafs embarked on a 60-game exhibition tour prior to the 1951 Ice Hockey World Championships, to raise the $10,000 to cover travel expenses and lost wages for the players. Hardy stated that profits for exhibition tours of Europe were limited by the number of rinks in Sweden, competition for ice shows in Great Britain, and that gate receipts were not allowed to be taken out of Czechoslovakia. The 1951 World Championships were hosted in Paris, and Canada won the gold medal represented by Lethbridge.

The IIHF presidency reverted to European control in 1951, and Kraatz returned to the post succeeding Hardy. Hardy remained a director with the IIHF, and recommended that the Soviet Union national ice hockey team be allowed to enter ice hockey at the 1952 Winter Olympics, provided there is no political interference and that IIHF rules were followed.

=== Later Canadian hockey career ===
In April 1945, Hardy sought to organize a senior hockey league including teams from Alberta and Saskatchewan. The result was the Western Canada Senior Hockey League which began in the 1945–46 season, with Hardy as a league governor. The first season had teams in Edmonton, Calgary, Saskatoon and Regina. A fifth team was added in Lethbridge in the 1946–47 season. The league produced the 1946 Allan Cup champion Calgary Stampeders, and the 1948 Allan Cup champion Edmonton Flyers. Hardy had nominated the Flyers to represent Canada at the 1947 Ice Hockey World Championships, but the CAHA ultimately did not to send a team due to funding issues. The league operated for six seasons, when it merged with the Pacific Coast Hockey League for the 1951–52 season, and later became the Western Hockey League for the 1952–53 season.

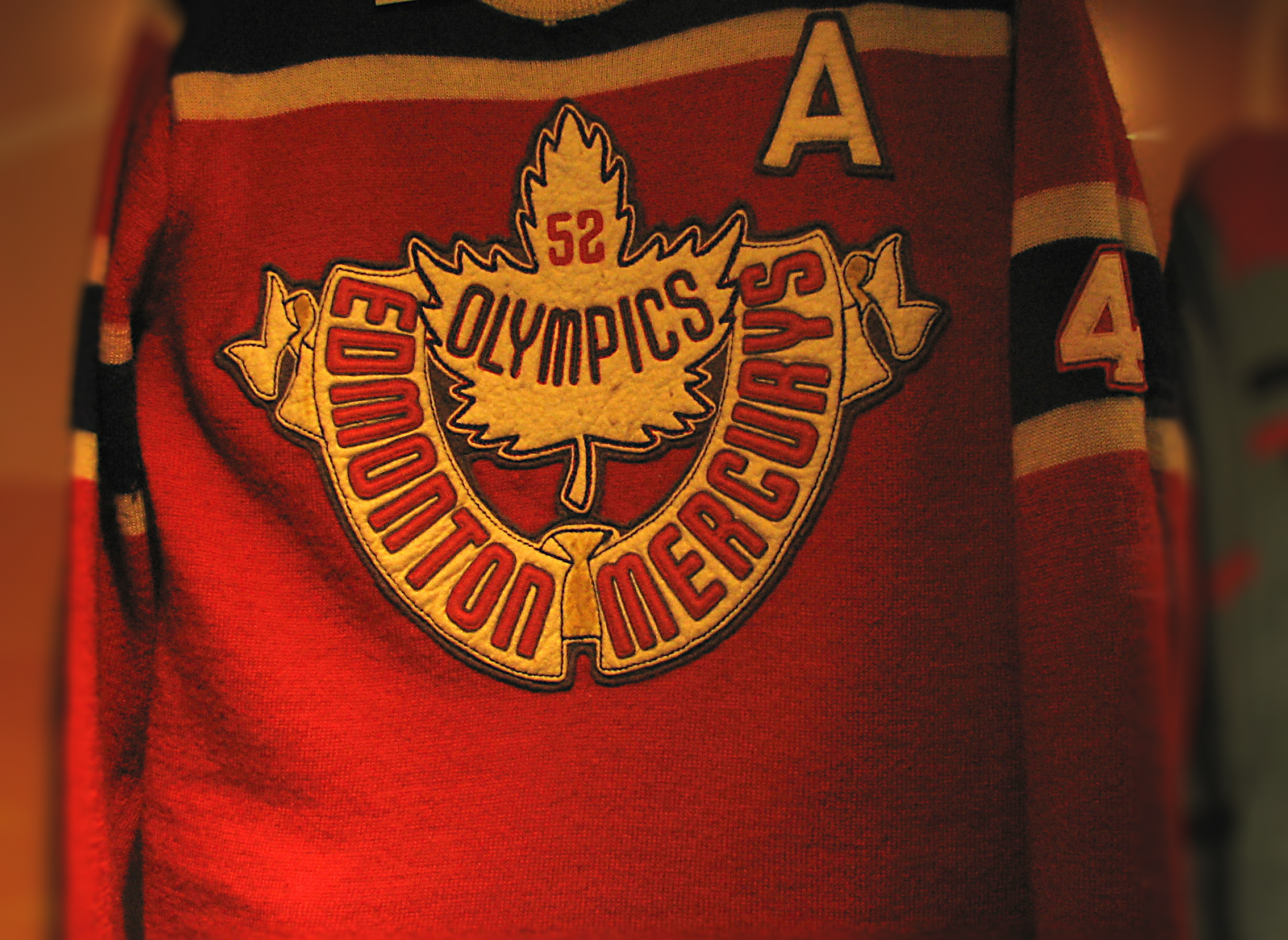
Hardy assisted in preparations for the Edmonton Mercurys (team jersey pictured) to represent Canada in ice hockey at the 1952 Winter Olympics.

Hardy remained involved with the AAHA, being elected to its board of directors as a representatives from the northern zone Alberta. He also represented the AAHA at the national CAHA meetings until 1953. He served as a convenor on the Western Canada intermediate hockey committee, and awarded the Melville Millionaires the Saskatchewan-Manitoba championship by default when the Letellier Maple Leafs withdrew. He was later made chairman of the committee, serving in the role until 1954.

In June 1949, the CAHA approved of a resolution by Hardy to establish cultural scholarships for music, painting and drama. Two scholarships worth $2000 each were open to Canadians between the ages of 18 and 30, with one recipient each from Eastern and Western Canada. Hardy assisted in preparations for the Edmonton Mercurys to represent Canada in ice hockey at the 1952 Winter Olympics, which included verification of amateur status for each player such as David Miller being a former semi-professional player reinstated as an amateur. The Mercurys went on to capture the gold medal with seven wins and a draw in eight games.

Hardy was a member of the CAHA committee to continue negotiations for the working agreement with the NHL in January 1954. The NHL wanted to transfer to players to eastern junior teams to develop, whereas the CAHA defended western teams wanting to keep players there to develop. Hardy warned that the CAHA must be "master in its own house" in any new agreement. He felt previous agreements worked well, but were an "uneasy marriage" due to the different motives of the organizations. He disagreed with the CAHA decision to allow direct NHL sponsorship junior teams, which gave the professionals too much say in CAHA business.

== Literary career ==
Creative writing is hard work...

"I write very fast. I never pretended to be a genius, but I have a talent for writing. I know my stuff"

— W. G. Hardy, 1979

Hardy began writing in his spare time in 1926, while his wife was away for two weeks. He first short story, "The Swamp Bridge", was published the same year. He wrote over 200 short stories and articles in his career, and many were published in Maclean's and The Saturday Evening Post. He was the primary editor for two anthologies, authored six historical books and eight novels of fiction. He wrote the screenplay for a four-part television series on life in Ancient Greece, and four plays produced by the Canadian Broadcasting Corporation.

Hardy elected vice-president of the Canadian Authors Association, for Alberta and British Columbia sections on June 3, 1946. He served as a judge for the 1946 and 1947 fiction writing contests sponsored by the Imperial Order Daughters of the Empire in Alberta. In April 1947, he stated there was too much Escapist fiction on the market, and advocated for more realistic writing with structure that presented an idea. In January 1950, he stated that "amateur writers need the passion most" and avoid being "arty". He felt writers should market their work as a compromise between what they want to write about and what the public wants. He said, "the function of words is to put across ideas – so why not market them?" Hardy was named president of the Canadian Authors Association on July 4, 1950, succeeding Will R. Bird. Hardy remained president of the Canadian Authors Association until 1952.

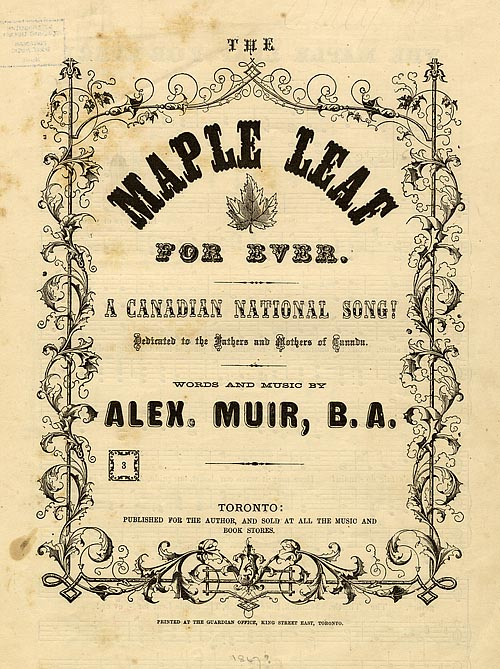
Hardy was a judge in a 1963 contest to find new lyrics for The Maple Leaf Forever (sheet music cover pictured).

Hardy stated that writing was his hobby, but he would not depend on it for income. He was inspired to write due to his love of the classics, and said stories are everywhere, "all you have to do is look for them". He later said, he said he was a fast writer and committed to producing 70 pages each week. He felt French Canadians produced fine literature, and were more in touch with their culture than other regions in Canada. In December 1963, the Canadian Authors Association offered $1,000 for new lyrics too The Maple Leaf Forever, claiming that it presently antagonized French Canadians. Hardy was selected as one of the judges in the contest.

Hardy was president of the Alberta division of the Canadian Authors Association in 1972. He stated that novel writing was increasing in Alberta, and cited writing contests and workshops as contributing factors. He felt it was never too late to start writing, and stated that "I believe that everyone has a novel inside them". He preferred the first-person narrative style of story telling, and that prospective authors should base a novel on a topic they are familiar with. He also felt that novels could incorporate more characters and have a less rigid structure than short stories.

Hardy taught at workshops for new creative writers in 1972 and 1973, in cooperation with a Government of Alberta program. He was a judge in the first For-A-New-Alberta Novelist Competition in 1974, then was chairman of its judging committee in 1978.

=== Books ===
Hardy published an analysis of World War II, written in 1951. He was the editor-in-chief of two anthologies about his adoptive province. The Alberta Golden Jubilee Anthology (1955) was a compilation of facts, fiction and verse as a tribute to Alberta, from more than 100 contributors. Alberta: A Natural History (1967), was published for the Canadian Centennial as a compilation by 25 Alberta scientists and naturalists, with illustrations.

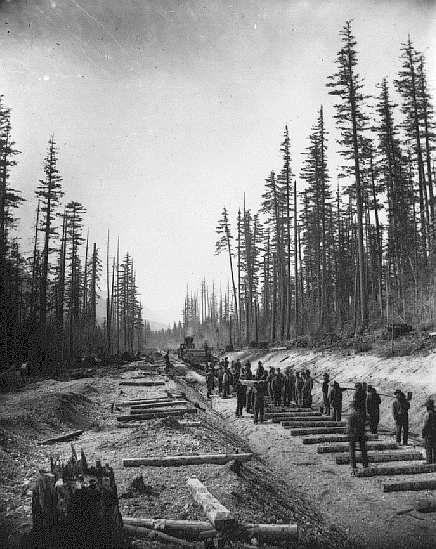
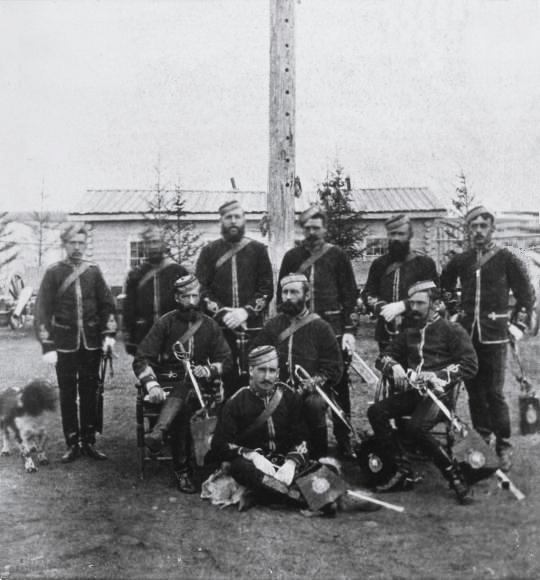
Hardy stated in From Sea Unto Sea: Canada — 1850 to 1910, that the building of the Canadian Pacific Railway and the westward march of the North-West Mounted Police were keys to settling Western Canada.

In 1959, Hardy's book From Sea Unto Sea: Canada — 1850 to 1910, was published as part of a series on Canadian history. Journalist Bruce Hutchison said that Hardy succeeded in showing that the creation of Canada was a robust, brawling story of adventure. It describes the events leading up to Canadian Confederation and the struggles between John A. Macdonald and George Brown; the rebellions led by Louis Riel; the Klondike Gold Rush; and the government of Wilfrid Laurier. Hardy also states that the building of the Canadian Pacific Railway and the westward march of the North-West Mounted Police were keys to settling Western Canada. The book also covers how the Canadian government starved the Great Sioux Nation out of Canada, and put the Plains Indians into Indian reserves.

Hardy's book, The Greek and Roman World was published in 1962. It is written in the first-person and describes Greek and Roman life. It covers the evolution of ancient Greek culture; Athens during 5th century BC; Greek democracy, writing and athletics; the Roman lifestyle and the fall of Rome.

Other books written by Hardy include Our Heritage from the Past (1964), an ancient history textbook for high school students; Journey into the past (1965), a textbook on ancient history and the Middle Ages; and Origins and Ordeals of the Western World: Lessons from Our Heritage in History (1968).

=== Novels ===
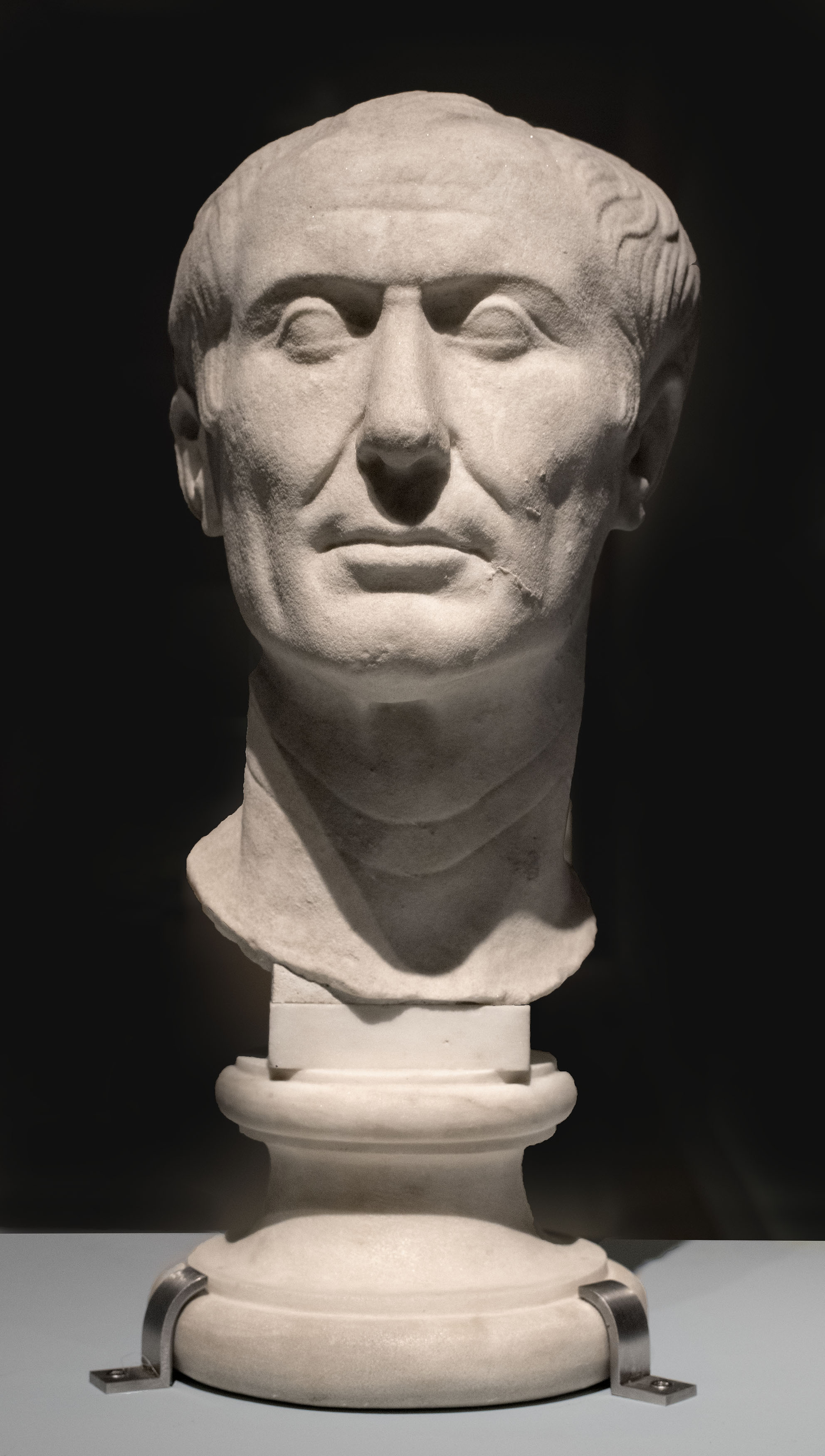
Bust of Julius Caesar; Ancient Rome and Caesar's life were recurring themes in Hardy's novels.

Hardy's first novel Son of Eli was purchased by Maclean's for $2,500, and published as a series from 1928 to 1929. The novel tells the story of Ontario farm and city life. His second novel, Father Abraham (1935), was published simultaneously in London, New York and Toronto by Macmillan Publishers. It tells the fictionalized life of Abraham based on the Book of Genesis and other historical research. Journalist Ralph Allen reported that Hardy made $17,000 in writing the book.

Hardy's third novel was Turn Back the River (1938). It is a tragic love story set in Rome during the time of Julius Caesar, Clodia, Sempronia, Catiline and Cicero. The story was described by W. T. Allison as "making dry bones live". In his fourth novel, Hardy wrote a fictionalized life for Moses in All the Trumpets Sounded (1942). The book review by The New York Times stated that Hardy attempted to recreate the life of Moses in a realistic method similar to modern novelists Franz Werfel, Thomas Mann, and Sholem Asch.

Hardy's fifth novel was The Unfulfilled (1952). Kirkus Reviews wrote it was a novel about a Canadian family during and after the World War II, and gave an unflattering but enlightening picture of how Canadians viewed Americans. The New York Times review stated "cultural annexation" was a recurring theme at the time, and Hardy argued that Canadians were getting too American.

Hardy's sixth novel was The City of Libertines (1957), which he wrote in three weeks and sold for $10,000. The book sold over 1 million copies', and tells the fictionalized story of Catullus and a love affair during the time of Caesar. The Financial Post described the book as "an authentic story of an absorbing era". His seventh novel was a book about the life of Julius Caesar, titled The Scarlet Mantle (1978). Hardy's eight and final novel was posthumously released in December 1979. Its title The Bloodied Toga, referred to the cloak worn by Caesar when assassinated. Reviewer Mary Heinitz compared the book to William Shakespeare's play Julius Caesar, with more "flesh and blood" added to historical facts.

When talking about Caesar in a 1979 interview Hardy said, "some think he was a man of destiny. I think he was just another opportunist. But he was brilliant in everything he did. He was the best swordsman in the Roman army and he was well muscled". Hardy had begun work on his memoirs as of 1979, and had speculated writing about Mark Antony and Cleopatra as a follow-up to the Bloodied Toga.

== Personal life and death ==
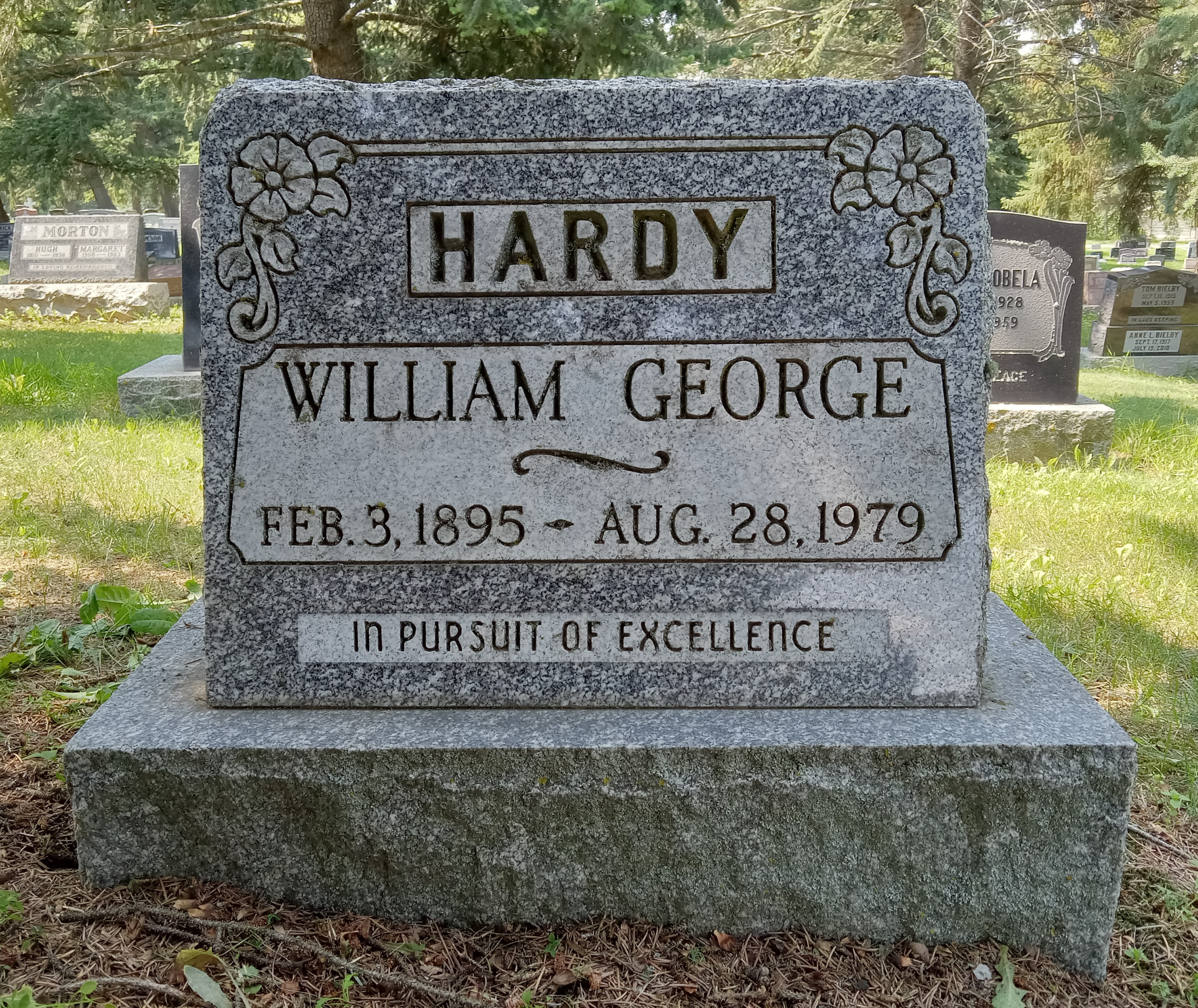
Hardy's grave marker

Hardy played baseball and basketball for seven years after he joined the faculty of University of Alberta, but most of his spare time was consumed by writing. He financed trips around the world from sales of his books, and travelled regularly to the Mediterranean region with his wife. He spoke fluent French in addition to Greek and Latin, and was president of the Edmonton Little Theatre in 1935.

His wife Llewella died on December 15, 1958, due to a stroke at age 61. They had been married for 39 years, and had three children. He dedicated his book From Sea Unto Sea, to the memory of his wife in 1959.

Hardy was the guest speaker at the opening banquet for the Edmonton Sports Hall of Fame in March 1961. He remarked that the nominees "conformed to the Greek ideal of the all-round man, both in education and in sport".

Hardy stated in a 1965 interview that Canada had earned the right to host the 1967 Ice Hockey World Championships during the Canadian Centennial, and the IIHF "made a serious mistake" in awarding hosting duties to Austria instead. He felt that Canada "must completely reassess the terms of its participating in a world event which it did the most to make". In 1970, he supported the decision by CAHA president Earl Dawson to withdraw from international hockey, and decline the hosting duties of the 1970 Ice Hockey World Championships. Hardy stated, "it was a matter of principle and action had to be taken", because it was common knowledge that players on the Soviet Union and Czechoslovak teams were professionals. In a 1974 interview, he stated that hockey had become more physical after World War II to suit the American spectator, similar to how football seems to glorify violence. He wished to see more rules enforced for safety and stated that, "once professionalism steps into the picture, the quality of sportsmanship tends to deteriorate".

Hardy died on August 28, 1979, in Edmonton, Alberta. He was interred at Mount Pleasant Cemetery in Edmonton.

== Honours and awards ==
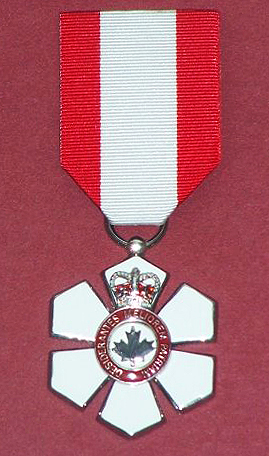
Medal of the Order of Canada

Hardy received several merit awards from hockey associations. He was made a life member of the CAHA on April 14, 1941, and was made a life member of the AAHA on November 10, 1941. He was given the AHAUS citation award in 1950, the Ontario Hockey Association Gold Stick award in 1953, and the CAHA order of merit in 1969. The CAHA presented Hardy with a service medallion at its general meeting in 1969.

For his literary career, he was named a lifetime fellow in the International Association of Arts and letters. He was given the honorary tribal chief title of "Chief Running Eagle" by the Sarcees. On April 30, 1958, the city of Edmonton honoured him with a gold-bound copy of his book "City of Libertines". In July 1962, he received the University of Alberta national award in letters, presented at the Banff School of Fine Arts. He was given an honorary Legum Doctor degree from the University of Alberta in 1973.

On December 17, 1973, the Governor General of Canada named Hardy a Member of the Order of Canada. The order was formally invested on April 2, 1974, for "his services to higher education and his contributions to amateur sport and to literature, as novelist and historian".

Hardy was honoured with several posthumous awards. He was inducted into the Alberta Golden Bears and Pandas Sports Wall of Fame in 1987. In 1989, he was inducted into the builder category of both the Hockey Alberta Hall of Fame, and the Alberta Sports Hall of Fame. In 2019, he was inducted into the builder category of the Canada West Hall of Fame.

== Legacy ==
Canadian journalists Ralph Allen and Scott Young credited Hardy and George Dudley as being the reformers who advocated for redefining amateurism and pushing the AAU of C to updates its laws, which led to the CAHA ultimately becoming independent of the AAU of C. Young further credited Hardy and Dudley for dealing with the issues of salaries and player compensation, and regulating the raiding of rosters by professional teams. Their reforms led to greater interest in the game in Canada, teams becoming sponsored by local companies and businesses, and improving the finances of the CAHA and other hockey governing bodies in Canada. Bunny Morganson of the Toronto Telegram described Hardy as a down-to-earth sportsman and humble gentleman, who as a businessman had the ability to solve problems and restored confidence in the CAHA.

Intermediate senior hockey was introduced to Western Canada by Hardy in 1933. The Brandon Sun credited Hardy for having the vision to see when senior hockey would become professional, and provide a local recreational senior division. Hardy donated a trophy for the runners-up for the East and West senior divisions in Canada, first contested in 1940 between the Port Arthur Bearcats and the Montreal Royals. He is the namesake of two additional ice hockey trophies. The Western Canadian Intercollegiate Athletic Union established the Dr. W. G. Hardy Trophy in 1951, awarded as the championship trophy for its men's ice hockey teams. The CAHA established the W. G. Hardy Trophy in 1968, which became known as the Hardy Cup. It was awarded to the national champion of the intermediate senior division. From 1984 onward, the trophy was awarded to the Senior AA division champions of Canada. The trophy was donated by a group of realtors from North Battleford, and retired from competition in 1990.

The University of Alberta Archives maintains fonds for Hardy dating from 1913 to 1979. The collection includes his student papers, lecture notes, CAHA documents, speeches, interviews, notebooks, draft manuscripts, plays, and short stories. In 1994, the University of Alberta merged Classics into the Department of History and Classics. The University of Alberta established the W. G. Hardy Collection of Ancient Near East and Classical Antiquities, at its Classics museum in 1975. As of 2011, the exhibit includes approximately 200 items, including a marble bust of Antonia Minor, the mother of the Roman Emperor Claudius, and an Athenian bell krater used for serving wine.

In 1979, the Canadian Broadcasting Corporation published a book including unedited transcripts of Hardy's radio programs. In The Literary History of Alberta: Volume I (1998), Canadian academic George Melnyk wrote that "Hardy succeeded in bringing the lives of historical figures to a broader audience". The database of Classical scholars maintained by Rutgers University states that Hardy was head of the University of Alberta's Classics Department "during the period of its greatest growth", and that "his publications reveal him as a humanist and pedagogue above all, but a man with a sound footing in the technical aspects of his subject".

== Bibliography ==
- Hardy, Stephen; Holman, Andrew C. (2018). Hockey: A Global History. Champaign, Illinois: University of Illinois Press. ISBN 978-0-252-05094-7 – via Google Books.
- Melnyk, George (1998). The Literary History of Alberta: Volume I. Edmonton, Alberta: The University of Alberta Press. ISBN 0-88864-296-2 – via Google Books.
- William H. New, ed. (2002). Encyclopedia of Literature in Canada. Toronto, Ontario: University of Toronto Press. ISBN 0-8020-0761-9 – via Google Books.
- Young, Scott (1989). 100 Years of Dropping the Puck. Toronto, Ontario: McClelland & Stewart. ISBN 0-7710-9093-5.
- Constitution, By-laws, Regulations, History. Gloucester, Ontario: Canadian Amateur Hockey Association. May 1990.
- Podnieks, Andrew (2005). Silverware. Bolton, Ontario: Fenn Publishing. ISBN 1-55168-296-6.

Preceded by Fritz Kraatz	President of the International Ice Hockey Federation; 1948 – 1951	Succeeded by Fritz Kraatz
