= International Ice Hockey Association =

Ice hockey governing body (1940–1947)

- Merged into: Ligue Internationale de Hockey sur Glace, 1947
- Formation: April 15, 1940
- Founded at: Montreal, Canada
- Dissolved: July 1, 1947
- Members: Canadian Amateur Hockey Association; Amateur Hockey Association of the United States; British Ice Hockey Association
- Official language: English
- President: W. G. Hardy
- First vice-president: Tommy Lockhart
- Second vice-president: Frank Sargent
- Secretary: George Dudley

The International Ice Hockey Association was a governing body for international ice hockey. It was established in 1940 when the Canadian Amateur Hockey Association wanted more control over international hockey, and was in disagreement with the definition of amateur used by the International Olympic Committee. The Amateur Hockey Association of the United States co-founded the association, with the British Ice Hockey Association joining later. The association oversaw the relationships between the National Hockey League, and leagues within the national amateur associations. W. G. Hardy served as its president, and planned for an amateur hockey World Series after World War II. The association was merged into the Ligue Internationale de Hockey sur Glace in 1947.

== Background ==
In the wake of Canada not winning the gold medal in ice hockey at the 1936 Winter Olympics, the Canadian Amateur Hockey Association (CAHA) pushed for an updated definition of amateur that met the realities of present-day sport in Canada, and would permit Canada to use its best non-professional players at international competitions. The revisions were led by W. G. Hardy and George Dudley on behalf of the CAHA, and were opposed by the Amateur Athletic Union of Canada (AAU of C) and its president W. A. Fry. The CAHA requested four changes to the amateur code of the AAU of C, which included; that players who tried out unsuccessfully for a professional team should be reinstated as amateurs; that professional and amateur hockey teams should be allowed to play exhibition games against each other; that players should be allowed to seek legitimate employment in hockey; and that players should be reimbursed by their employers for time lost from work while competing on behalf of their clubs. The AAU of C rejected three of the four proposals, which led to the CAHA separating from its parent organization.

International hockey in the United States in 1937 was governed by the Amateur Athletic Union. After the CAHA split ways from the AAU of C, the American union terminated its working agreement with the CAHA in March 1937, that had allowed for the transferring of players and exhibition games between the two countries. In August 1937, the AAU issued an ultimatum to the Eastern Amateur Hockey League (EAHL), not to have any Canadian-born players in its league. EAHL president and hockey promoter Tommy Lockhart then entered into negotiations with the CAHA, and reached an agreement to transfer a limited number of Canadian players to the league. The EAHL then broke away from the AAU as its governing body. Lockhart recognized the need for a national governing body to efficiently manage hockey within the United States, and founded the Amateur Hockey Association of the United States (AHAUS) later in 1937.

In September 1938, the CAHA and AHAUS reached a working agreement which regulated international games in North America, set out provisions for transfer of players between the organizations, and recognized of each other's authority. Since both the CAHA and the Amateur Athletic Union were members of Ligue Internationale de Hockey sur Glace (LIHG), the American union protested the CAHA affiliation with AHAUS. The CAHA felt that AHAUS was the most comprehensive ice hockey governing body in the United States, and stayed with the 1938 agreement. The decision would potentially lose Canada its membership in the LIHG, and the ability to compete at the Ice Hockey World Championships or ice hockey at the Olympic Games. The LIHG ruled in favour of the protest, but the CAHA continued its association with AHAUS. LIHG president Paul Loicq subsequently chose to allow for the continued negotiations. By then, the AAU of C decided to adopt the definition of amateur as laid out by the respective world governing body of each sport as recognized by the International Olympic Committee (IOC), and looked to bring the CAHA back under its jurisdiction. The CAHA updated its constitution to define an amateur player as one who, "either has not engaged or is not engaged in organized professional hockey", and ultimately declined to rejoin the AAU of C.

== Foundation of the association ==
On April 15, 1940, the CAHA and AHAUS agreed to form a new governing body known tentatively as the International Ice Hockey League, and invited the British Ice Hockey Association (BIHA) to join. Hardy who was also the CAHA president, stated that "the purpose of the new association is to promote the game of hockey among the three Anglo-Saxon nations". He was named president of the new body, and Lockhart was named first vice-president. The BIHA was asked to nominate the second vice-president position.

Hardy explained the International Ice Hockey Association as a means of shifting the control of world hockey from Belgium to Canada, "where it rightfully belonged". He also noted the inactivity of the LIHG resulting from World War II. He sought for acceptance by the IOC on terms acceptable to the CAHA. A constitution for the new association was delegated to a committee including future CAHA presidents Hanson Dowell and W. B. George. The constitution stated that the associations president must be an executive officer or a past-president of the CAHA. The CAHA gave C$500 to the association, and an honorarium to Hardy for expenses.

== Professional–amateur relations ==
Amateur and junior ice hockey teams in Canada were upset about losing players to professional leagues without compensation, and Hardy set about to negotiate reimbursement of the Canadian teams when a player became professional. The CAHA had introduced player contracts for the 1940–41 season, with the goal to keep junior-aged and amateur players under service in Canada instead of leaving for professional leagues.

In September 1940, Hardy announced a one-year agreement was reached with the National Hockey League (NHL) to reimburse the amateur associations, which included $250 for signing an amateur and another $250 if the amateur played in the NHL. The new professional-amateur agreement was signed by Frank Calder on behalf of the NHL in October 1940, and also applied to leagues in the BIHA and the Eastern Amateur Hockey League in the United States. The distribution of the development funds from the NHL was based on the service time the amateur had with each respective club. The agreement included allowing the NHL to sign a limited number of junior age players.

Hardy decided on disputes of players becoming professionals, and reinstatements as amateurs. He committed to decide on all application within 15 days to expedite transfers and reinstatements due to wartime enlistments and travel restrictions. He stated, "we believe that the movement between professional and amateur ranks should be made as easy as possible", which included former professionals being welcomed back in amateur.

By 1942, the agreement had brought in $17,241 in development fees to junior teams. Demand for junior-aged players during the 1941–42 NHL season was higher due to war-time travel restrictions on older players. Calder reported there was a general agreement with the amateur leagues that a junior-aged player should be able to determine his own financial future due to the war.

In 1943, Hardy recommended adjustments in amateur payments for players becoming professional, since many later enlisted shortly after signing a contract. He felt that under normal circumstances, junior-aged players should not be signed to professional contracts. He negotiated wartime measures with the NHL, without opposition being raised by presidents of the provincial associations. The Pacific Coast Hockey League began in 1944, and competed for junior-aged players. Hardy ruled that since the league operated under affiliation with AHAUS, the existing international transfer rules and professional–amateur agreement would apply to the new league.

In April 1945, Hardy was re-elected president, and Lockhart was re-elected first vice-president. Frank Sargent was elected the second vice-president, and Dudley was elected the secretary. By 1946, the professional–amateur agreement provided more than $45,000 in development fees. The association and the NHL agreed to enforce suspensions for players not fulfilling a tryout contract. Hardy then declined transfers to those under such a contract.

In May 1946, the NHL proposed a flat payment of $20,000 to cover all players being signed to professional contracts, whereas the CAHA requested $2000 for any player remaining in the NHL for more than a year. Hardy felt the CAHA was at a disadvantage to press too hard, and wanted to maintain good relations with the NHL and AHAUS. The flat rate offer was later accepted with the stipulation that a junior-aged player could sign a contract at age 16, but not play professional until age 18.

Lockhart threatened to resign as vice-president and withdraw AHAUS from the association in January 1947, after the CAHA requested a $100 fee for international transfers. He refused the fee, stating the CAHA had no authority to make that request. Several players had left Canada without proper documentation, but Hardy ultimately allowed the players to remain in the United States.

== World hockey relations ==
At the 1944 CAHA general meeting in Montreal, a motion was passed to sever relations with the LIHG. Another a motion of confidence was passed in the International Ice Hockey Association, and closer relationships between the CAHA, AHAUS and the BIHA.

In April 1945, Hardy envisioned an amateur hockey World Series after World War II, involving teams from Canada, the United States, England and Scotland. The proposed series would be an annual event between the North American and European champion to begin in 1947 or 1948.

Hardy expected hockey to grow after the war, and said proper rules had been established to limited transfers and prevent raiding of Canadian rosters. He expected a large number of Canadian soldiers stationed in Europe to remain there playing hockey. Post-war plans were discussed on how to co-ordinate classification of clubs for international competition. In May 1946, the Swedish Ice Hockey Association and French Ice Hockey Federation expressed interest in joining the association.

== Merger with the LIHG ==
The association met in August 1946 in New York City, along with guests from the Scottish Ice Hockey Association, French and Swedish associations. At the meeting, it was agreed to propose a merger with the LIHG to oversee international ice hockey. A proposal would also be submitted for the Ice Hockey World Championships to alternate between Europe and North America, with the Olympic hockey tournaments played under the same rules as the CAHA and the NHL. Hardy's resolution from 1941 stated the merger was acceptable if the CAHA definition of amateur was approved, the membership and voting system was acceptable to the CAHA, and that AHAUS be admitted as a member to the merged organization. The CAHA sought to have Hardy nominated as vice-president of the new governing body, and Dudley as its secretary.

The CAHA attended the LIHG meeting during the 1947 Ice Hockey World Championships in Prague, and pushed for the definition of amateur to be anyone not actively engaged in professional sport. Incoming CAHA president Al Pickard stated that the CAHA and AHAUS would operate with complete autonomy under the structure of the agreement to join the LIHG. The LIHG agreed to a merger where the presidency would alternate between North America and Europe every three years, and recognized AHAUS as the governing body of hockey in the United States. A decision on increased voting power for the CAHA was deferred, and the CAHA was permitted to have its own definition of amateur as long as teams at the Olympic games adhered to existing LIHG rules. Hardy agreed to the merger and accepted the vice-presidency of the LIHG. The Association was dissolved on July 1, 1947. The LIHG was renamed the International Ice Hockey Federation in 1948, and Hardy served as its president from 1948 to 1951.
