= MMHL =

MMHL can refer to:

- Manitoba Midget 'AAA' Hockey League
- Maritime Major Hockey League
