= Doug Grimston =

Canadian ice hockey administrator (1900–1955)

- Born: May 18, 1900; New Westminster, British Columbia, Canada
- Died: September 14, 1955 (aged 55); New Westminster, British Columbia, Canada
- Resting place: Forest Lawn Memorial Park
- Occupations: Businessman and parks commission chairman
- Known for: Canadian Amateur Hockey Association and British Columbia Amateur Hockey Association president

Douglas George Grimston (May 18, 1900 – September 14, 1955) was a Canadian ice hockey administrator who served as president of the Canadian Amateur Hockey Association (CAHA) from 1950 to 1952. He oversaw the establishment of the Major Series for the Alexander Cup and implemented a new deal for player contracts in senior ice hockey, in response to the Allan Cup championship being dominated by a small group of teams who sought to protect themselves from professional leagues recruiting their players. He opposed the National Hockey League wanting its junior ice hockey prospect players on stronger teams, which led to limits on the transfer of players to keep balanced competition for the Memorial Cup. After the 1952 Winter Olympics where the Canada men's national ice hockey team won the gold medal, Grimston recommended withdrawal from Olympic hockey since European nations would never agree to ice hockey rules which allowed physical play. Grimston later accused International Ice Hockey Federation vice-president Bunny Ahearne of financially exploiting of the Edmonton Mercurys on a European tour, which led to a physical altercation between them.

Grimston served as president of the British Columbia Amateur Hockey Association from 1942 to 1947, and was credited by The Canadian Press for keeping junior ice hockey operational despite the lack of facilities and dwindling attendance during World War II. He also sat on the national committee to oversee minor ice hockey in Canada, and sought for the transparency of finances in amateur hockey. He served as a director for the New Westminster Royals and played a leading role in their successful bid to join the Western Hockey League in 1952. He was a vocal supporter of the Penticton Vees and led a committee to oversee travel arrangements for the team as it won the 1955 Ice Hockey World Championships for Canada. He was a member of multiple community service groups, served four terms as chairman of the New Westminster Parks Commission and was president of the local Rotary Club. He sought for the construction of the Queen's Park Stadium and to expand and beautify city parks. Grimston died in 1955 at age 55, was posthumously recognized by New Westminster with Grimston Park named in his honour the same year, and was described by Jimmy Dunn as "one of the most colourful and aggressive presidents the CAHA ever had".

== Early life and family ==
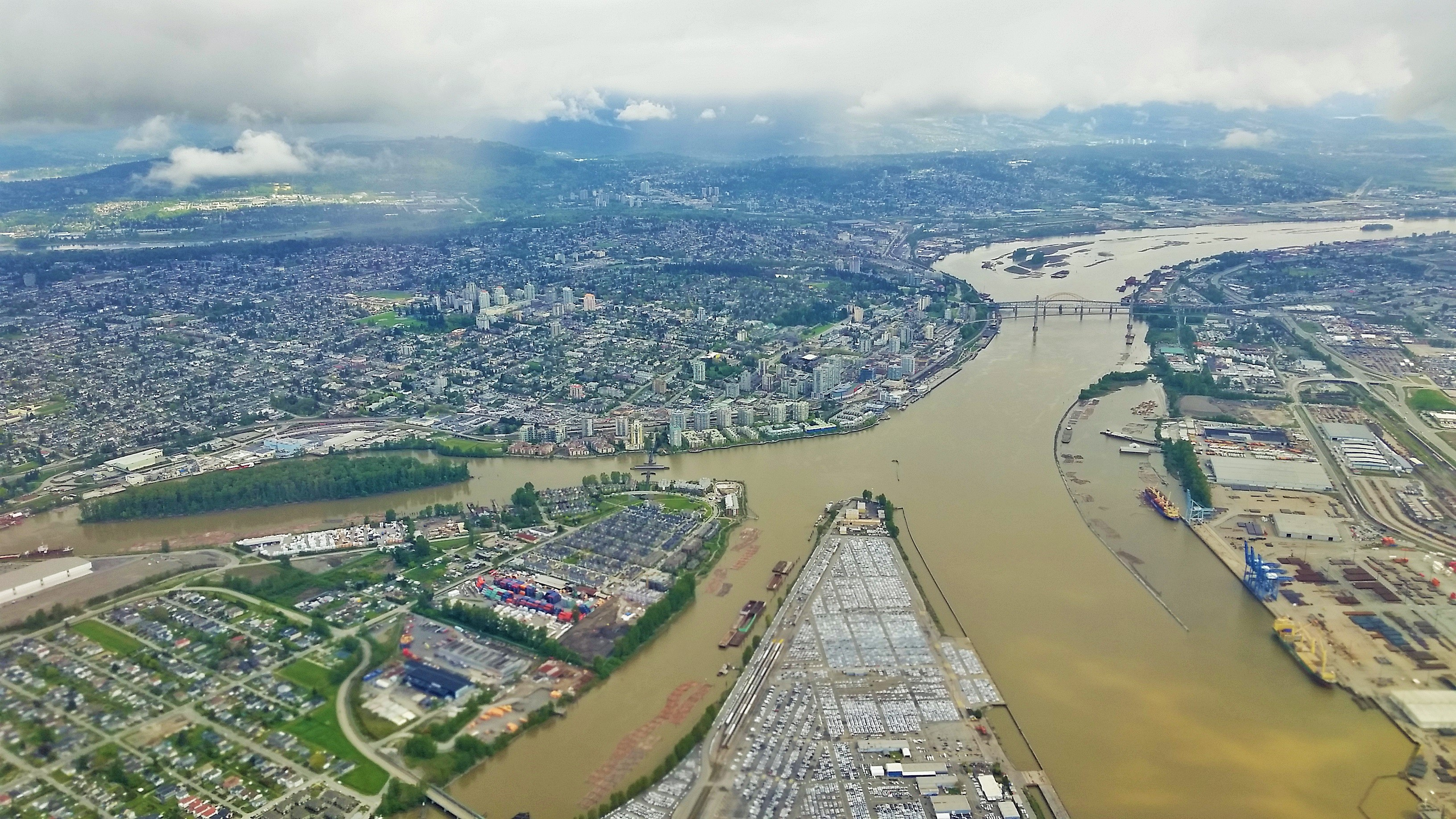
Aerial view of New Westminster

Douglas George Grimston was born on May 18, 1900, in New Westminster, British Columbia. He was the son of George Grimston and Jean McCormack, both of whom were Protestants from England. Grimston played baseball, soccer and lacrosse as a youth. He was a member of the British Columbia Manufacturing Company baseball team who were city champions of New Westminster in 1920 and 1923, and was a member of the Sapperton AFC team who won the second division and the Lower Mainland Cup championship during the 1923 and 1924 soccer seasons.

Grimston married schoolteacher Marjorie Evelyn Gilley on September 5, 1928, in New Westminster. They had one son and three daughters, and were married until her death on October 4, 1952.

== Business and community life ==
Grimston worked for Westminster Ice Limited, a trucking company which delivered ice and was owned by his father. Grimston later worked at Westminster Hog Fuels for 25 years and was a managing director for the company. He was a member of the local Masonic lodge and the Elks of Canada; and served as a president of the New Westminster Rotary Club, the junior board of trade in New Westminster, and the Vancouver Golf Club.

Grimston was a director for the New Westminster Royals, and insisted on the continuation of a smoking ban at the Queen's Park Arena. Despite criticism by the local parks commissioner that the ban had a negative effect on attendance, Grimston indicated that he would take financial responsibility for lost attendance. He also served as president of the New Westminster Athletic Association, and played a leading role in a successful bid by the Royals to join the Western Hockey League in 1952. He later served four terms as chairman of the New Westminster Parks Commission. He sought to expand and beautify parks in the city, and for the construction of the Queen's Park Stadium. He was defeated for re-election to the commission in 1954.

== BCAHA executive ==
The Allan Cup was the championship trophy for amateur senior ice hockey in Canada.

Grimston first joined to the British Columbia Amateur Hockey Association (BCAHA) executive in 1938, and was elected its vice-president in 1941. Following the attack on Pearl Harbor, he announced the cancellation of games until the end of blackout orders along the coast of the Pacific Ocean, and hoped to resume games with adjustments made for the blackout.

In 1941, Grimston predicted the collapse of senior ice hockey in the province due to rumours that sponsors from the British Columbia Interior were tired of supporting expensive amateur teams, and that the Kimberley Dynamiters and the Trail Smoke Eaters would drop down to the lower intermediate level classification to save money. The Trail Daily Times denied the rumors and stated a desire to remain at the top level and be eligible for the Allan Cup. The teams played in the West Kootenay League which subsequently suspended operations in 1941 due to World War II.

Grimston was elected president of the BCAHA to succeed A. W. McDonald in 1942. At the next CAHA general meeting in 1943, Grimston was appointed to the committee to oversee minor ice hockey in Canada, and was named one of three trustees for the Edmonton Journal Cup. The trophy had been donated by the Edmonton Journal and was to be awarded as the championship for Western Canada intermediate level ice hockey.

In December 1944, brothers Norm and Jack Kirk who played for the Nanaimo Clippers, went on strike and demanded more pay for amateur play. Although the brothers faced a possible suspension since the demands were too high, Grimston stated a preference to have amateur finances in the open rather than under-the-table bonuses being given.

In February 1945, Major Ian Eisenhardt, the director of physical fitness for the national fitness branch of the Ministry of Health, stated that his department would be the future liaison between the Government of Canada and sports organizations in Canada. Grimston felt that hockey had been successful since its leaders sacrificed personal gain for the betterment of the sport, and stated that "the government is missing the boat if it's going to try and regiment sports as it has regimented business".

The BCAHA was scheduled to host the 1945 Allan Cup final in Vancouver, but only two of the nine teams eligible for the Eastern Canada championship from the Quebec Amateur Hockey Association were willing to attend the final series. Grimston recommended the championship series be cancelled due to the lack of interest in travelling across the country due to financial constraints during World War II. CAHA president Frank Sargent announced the cancellation of the 1945 Allan Cup playoffs, which was the first season in which the trophy had not been contested since the inaugural 1909 Allan Cup.

The national senior hockey championship resumed with the 1946 Allan Cup. The Vancouver Canucks and the New Westminster Royals expressed interest, but both teams played in the Pacific Coast Hockey League (PCHL) which had a playoffs schedule which overlapped with the CAHA's Allan Cup playoffs structure. Grimston's appeal to accommodate the teams by extending the Allan Cup deadlines was declined, and only the New Westminster Royals entered the Allan Cup since they did not qualify for the PCHL playoffs.

The CAHA had accepted an invitation by Grimston for the BCAHA to host the 1945 general meeting, but hosting the meeting in Vancouver was deferred until after the war in 1946. He entertained delegates to the 1946 meeting with sightseeing visits in Vancouver, Victoria and Nanaimo. During five years as president of the BCAHA, Grimston was credited by The Canadian Press for keeping junior ice hockey operational in British Columbia despite the challenges of the lack of facilities and dwindling attendance during the war. He was succeeded as president by F. F. Becker in 1947.

== CAHA vice-president ==
The Memorial Cup was the championship trophy for junior ice hockey in Canada.

Grimston was elected second vice-president of the CAHA in May 1947, receiving more votes than Manitoba Amateur Hockey Association president Jimmy Dunn. The general meeting in 1947 discussed a new financial agreement with the National Hockey League (NHL) to increase payments for amateurs signed to contracts, and proposed creating a higher level of senior hockey competition since a small group of teams were dominating the Allan Cup playoffs. In his first season as a vice-president, Grimston sought a new agreement to govern player transfers between leagues, since the movement of players had been a recurring issue with teams in Western Canada and the PCHL.

In the weeks leading up to the 1948 general meeting, the CAHA considered two proposals to semi-professionalize player contracts in junior and senior hockey. Grimston sat on a special seven-person committee which deliberated on the ideas submitted by NHL president Clarence Campbell and Ontario Hockey Association president George Panter, then declined to present the proposals for voting on by the delegates to the general meeting. The committee also rejected calls to drop the word amateur from its name, and stated that the CAHA was built upon teams which operated as a community efforts and that profits were invested into development of minor hockey.

Grimston was elected first vice-president of the CAHA, to fill the void left by the unexpected death of Norman Dawe, and was named chairman of the CAHA's resolutions committee. The committee sent an invitation to the Newfoundland Amateur Hockey Association to join the CAHA, since Newfoundland had become Canada's tenth province on March 31, 1949. The committee wanted to balance competition for the Memorial Cup and Allan Cup, and avoid a repeat occurrence where no team from British Columbia entered the 1948 Memorial Cup playoffs due to the difficulty of being competitive. The committee allowed BCAHA junior teams to import four players per team during the playoffs, compared to two players elsewhere in Canada. In senior hockey, the committee allowed BCAHA and Maritime Amateur Hockey Association teams to import six players per team, compared to four players elsewhere in Canada. The committee also agreed that the CAHA should seek for the professional-amateur agreement with the NHL to be amended with respect to the placement of players and avoid concentrating talent in certain geographic areas. Grimston felt that the NHL could determine when a junior player became professional, but should not be allowed to dictate player transfers and tell the CAHA which team the junior-aged player would be on.

Grimston was re-elected first vice-president in June 1949. He served as chairman of the rules and regulations committee which debated at great length several proposed changes to the icing the puck rule. Grimston sought to delete the existing rule which further penalized a team that was playing short-handed, whereas other delegates favoured keeping the rule which made the defending team carry the puck past their own blue line. A compromise was reached, where an icing infraction would not be called if a player on the defending team attempted to gain control of the puck.

== CAHA president ==
=== First term ===
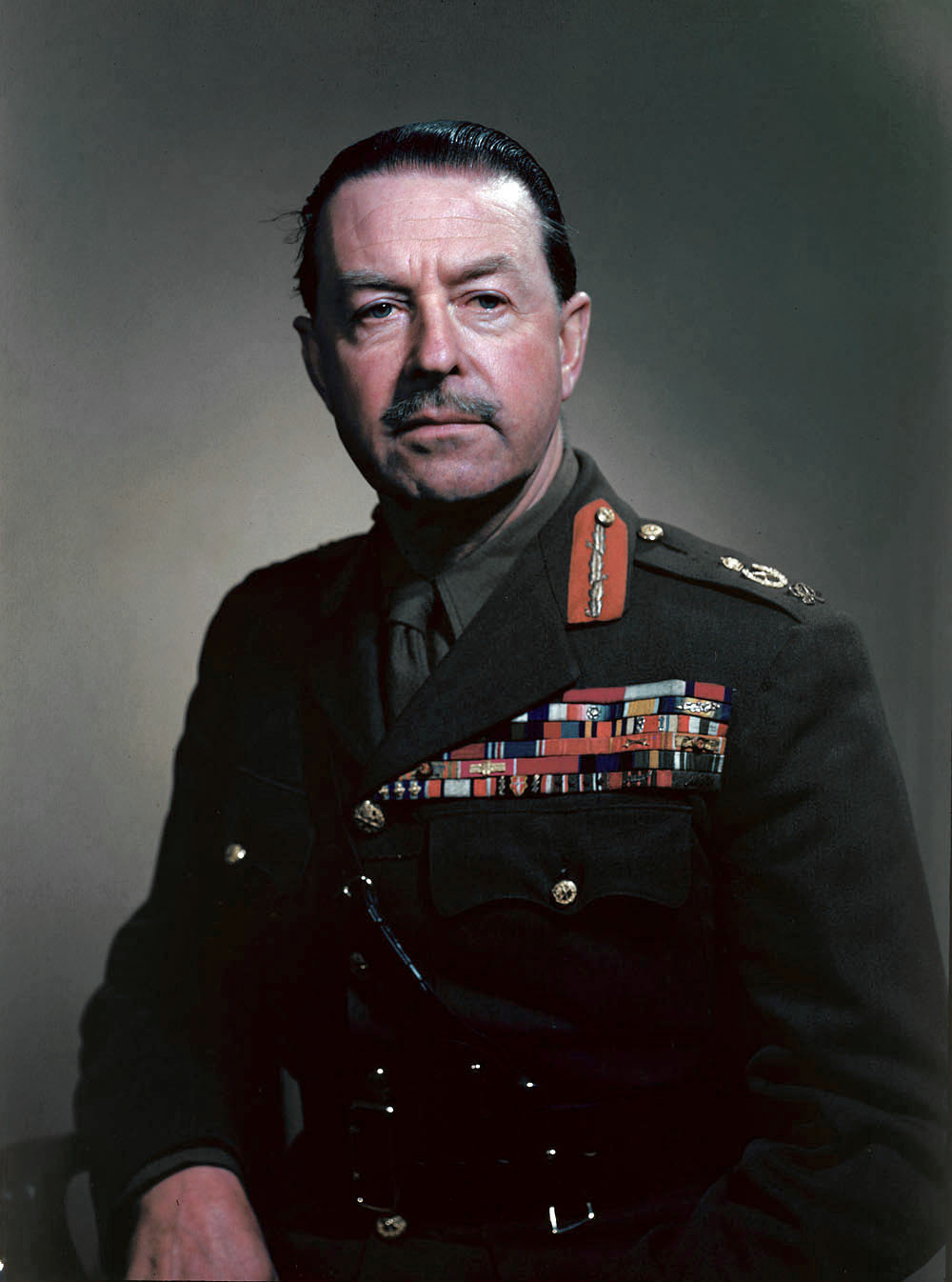
Viscount Alexander, the 17th Governor General of Canada

Grimston was elected president of the CAHA on June 10, 1950, to succeed Al Pickard. At the general meeting, the CAHA decided that its five best calibre senior leagues would compete for a new trophy at a higher level than the Allan Cup. The Western Canada Senior Hockey League, the OHA Senior A League, the Quebec Senior Hockey League, the Maritime Major Hockey League, and the Cape Breton Senior Hockey League, requested a new deal, and complained that their players were too costly to obtain and could easily leave since no contractual commitment was required.

Grimston supported the concept and sought to stabilize Allan Cup competition, insisted that the proposed contract have a termination clause, and wanted to resolve the differences since he felt that the leagues might break away from the CAHA and become professional without an agreement in place. The CAHA agreed on contracts for senior hockey which tied players to a team for the season, gave the first right of refusal to the same for the following season, and proposed that professional teams could draft senior players.

In July 1950, Grimston announced that the CAHA would operate a Major Series in a similar east-versus-west playoffs format as the Allan Cup. The CAHA set a minimum salary of C$1,000 per player, and allowed teams in the Maritimes to import an additional four players from outside of their territory to strengthen perceived weaker teams. Professional leagues did not approve of the Major Series proposal, since it meant they would lose control of players already on their reserve lists. The decision indefinitely deferred the Major Series.

In September 1950, Grimston announced the revival of the Major Series including the same five leagues. Teams from the BCAHA considered joining, although Grimston urged them to remain in the more affordable lower level series for the Allan Cup. In November 1950, he announced the Alexander Cup would be the championship trophy of the Major Series, as presented by the Viscount Alexander, the 17th Governor General of Canada. Players in the Major Series were not signed to contracts as originally proposed, and the CAHA reached an agreement with the NHL which limited the number of players that could be drafted.

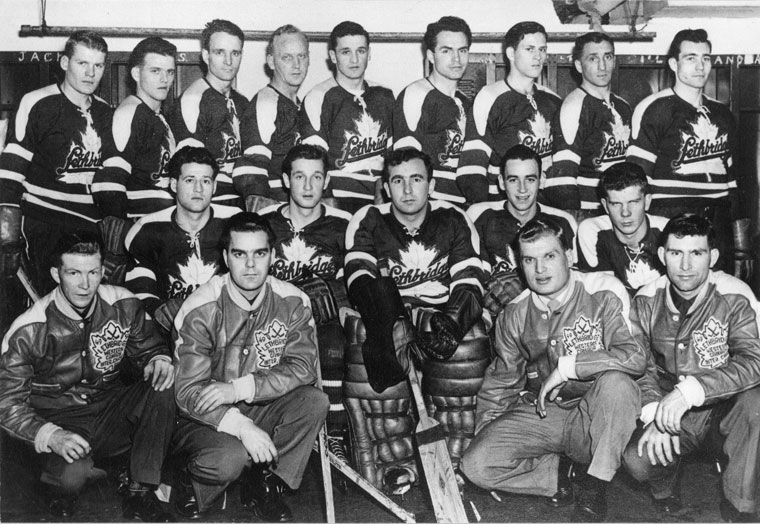
Lethbridge Maple Leafs in 1951

Grimston announced that the Lethbridge Maple Leafs who played intermediate level senior hockey, were chosen to represent Canada at the 1951 Ice Hockey World Championships and to play a European tour. Lethbridge won the World Championships and were undefeated at the event. Grimston commended the team on its sportsmanship and gentlemanly play on behalf of Canada.

=== Second term ===
Grimston was re-elected president in May 1951. The CAHA continued the Major Series and required its leagues to post a $5,000 bond and guarantee a champion by a national deadline. Grimston later announced that only the Quebec Senior Hockey League and the Maritime Major Hockey League would play in the Major Series for the 1951–52 season. The CAHA amended its icing rule to allow the defending team to shoot the puck from anywhere behind its own blue line. Grimston voted against the change and felt it would decrease offensive action on a power play. The change caused a potential rift with the NHL since it contradicted their agreement to have mutual ice hockey rules.

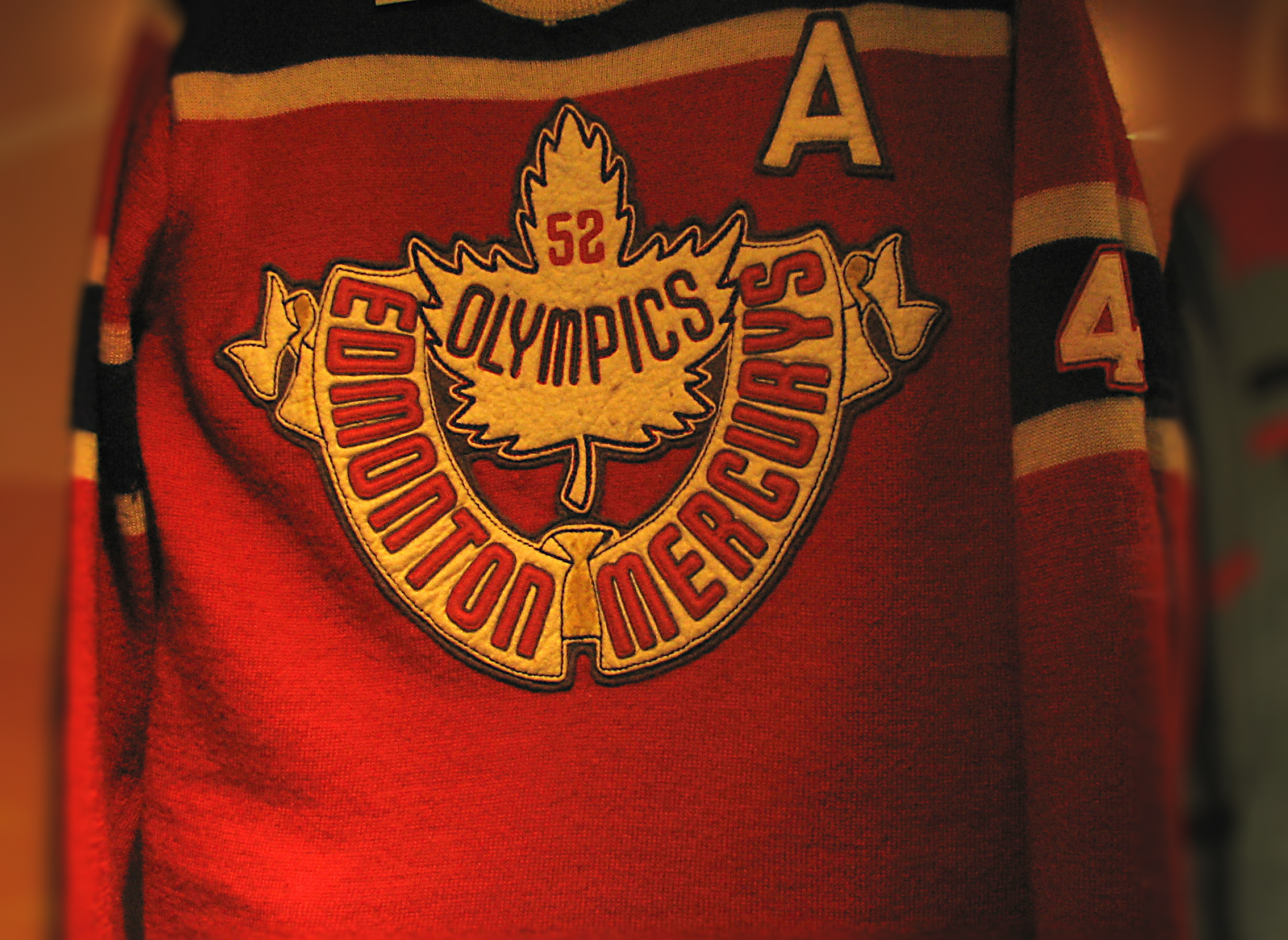
Edmonton Mercurys jersey used in ice hockey at the 1952 Winter Olympics

In July 1951, Grimston announced that the Edmonton Mercurys were chosen to represent Canada in ice hockey at the 1952 Winter Olympics in Oslo. The team previously won the 1950 Ice Hockey World Championships representing Canada. Grimston was appointed an ex-officio member of the European executive council of the International Ice Hockey Federation (IIHF), which would oversee hockey at the Olympics. Less than two weeks before the Olympics began, George VI died. Grimston issued a directive that no games be played under CAHA jurisdiction on February 15, 1952, the day of the king's funeral.

Swiss newspapers criticized the rough play by Canada and the United States team, and questioned whether hockey should be part of the Olympics. Grimston felt the games were tame compared to North American standards and that the Olympics would suffer without hockey which was its biggest attraction. He also stated that he would not complain if Canada was no longer invited to Olympic hockey.

Canada and the United States played to a draw in the final game of the round-robin, which placed the teams first and second respectively in the standings for the gold and silver medals. Had Canada won, the United States would have placed fourth. A newspaper in Moscow charged that a deal had been made to predetermine the outcome and assure the United States of a silver medal and to exclude the Czechoslovakia team from a medal. Grimston dismissed the charges as silly, and implied that they were made in relation to the Soviet Union team's intention to begin participating in hockey at the Olympics in 1956. He further stated, "I told [the Soviets] they were crybabies, and that's quite a feat getting it over to them, as they use an interpreter who speaks only French".

The CAHA booked European tours and accommodations for the Canada men's national ice hockey team through travel agent Bunny Ahearne, who at the time was also the secretary of the British Ice Hockey Association and vice-president of the IIHF. Grimston and Ahearne had a physical altercation in an Oslo hotel lobby on February 25, 1952, which was not publicized until two weeks later. Journalist Jim Coleman reported that Grimston threw a punch at Ahearne, who in turn kicked Grimston in the stomach. Grimston stated that the perceived exploitation of the Edmonton Mercurys on their European tour by Ahearne led to the altercation, and later admitted that he was wrong to lose his temper but that he never punched Ahearne and had grabbed him by the shirt and shook him. Grimston complained that Edmonton Mercurys players were given only five pounds per week for expenses, which he felt was "hardly enough to pay their laundry and some postage stamps". The Edmonton Mercurys continued playing after "heated discussions" in which the team threatened to shorten the tour and accused Ahearne of "siphoning profits" beyond his 10 per cent cut.

After Grimston returned from Europe, he recommended that Canada withdraw from Olympic ice hockey and made note of the difference in style of play where body checking was not allowed in Europe, nor shadowing a player defensively. He felt the notion that European tours by Canadian teams had created goodwill was "plain bunk", and argued that European newspapers frequently criticized Canadians for rough play.

"There is no use carrying on any longer. European nations in particular, will not agree to uniform rules. As a result, every game is a confusion of shinny, with a sprinkling of hockey".

— Doug Grimston, March 6, 1952

==== 1952 general meeting ====
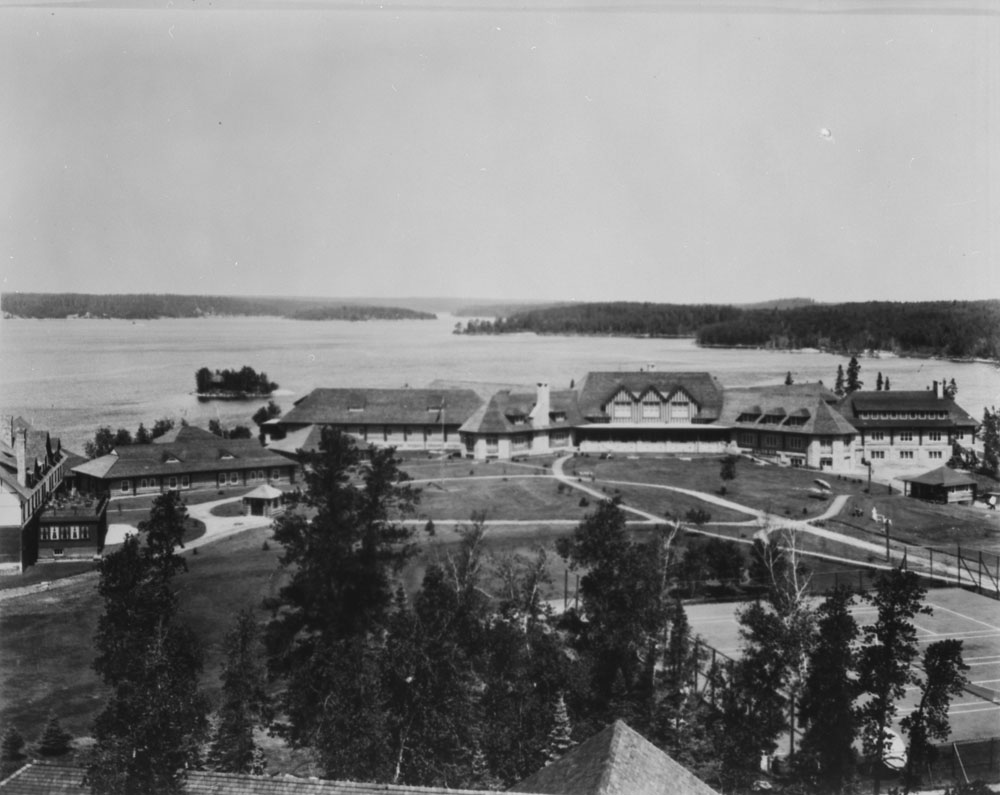
Minaki Lodge hosted the 1952 CAHA general meeting.

The Canadian Press expected a showdown at the 1952 general meeting where Grimston would call for the resignation of Ahearne as the CAHA's European representative, but argued that Ahearne would likely be retained due to the strong influence he wielded and the need to have representation for Canadians playing in European leagues. Ahearne volunteered his resignation instead, and said "In fairness to everybody it is best that I resign". The CAHA accepted the resignation with no discussion.

The CAHA ratified an agreement Grimston reached with the NHL and its minor leagues, which set a deadline of January 15 for drafting players from the Major Series with exceptions only for emergency replacements. The deal avoided the loss of players for the Alexander Trophy playoffs.

The CAHA wanted to balance the Memorial Cup playoffs, and avoid a further talent shift in junior hockey due to requests by professional teams to transfer prospect players to teams in Eastern Canada. The CAHA declined to grant transfers for junior players from Western Canada to Eastern Canada for two seasons, and Grimston felt the decision was within the limits of the existing agreement with the NHL.

Grimston had indefinitely suspended Guyle Fielder during the 1950–51 season, for failure to report to the minor league affiliate of the Chicago Black Hawks after the player had signed a C-form which a financial bonus in exchange for a future commitment. The CAHA recognized that the C-form was a controversial clause since its incorporation into the agreement with the NHL in 1947, and that it had been frequently criticized by the media, coaches and players' parents as slavery. The resolutions committee agreed to ask for revisions to the agreement with respect to the C-form, the size of reserve lists and the right of the NHL to sponsor to junior players and teams. Grimston clarified the requests by saying that the intent was to tell the NHL that members of the CAHA were not satisfied, rather than "holding a pistol to their heads".

W. B. George from the Ottawa District Hockey Association was elected CAHA president to succeed Grimston.

== Later life and honours ==
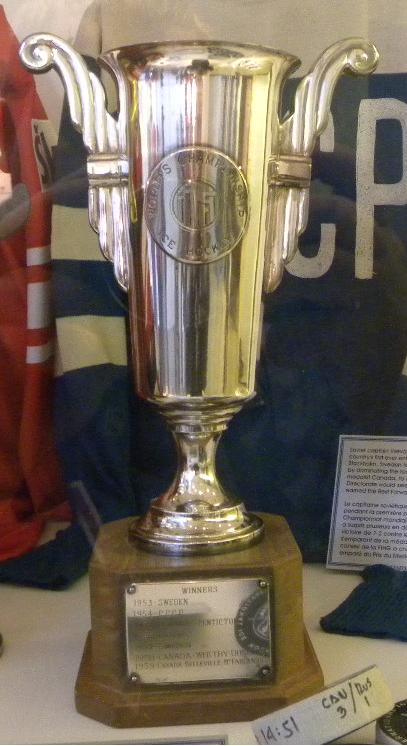
Ice Hockey World Championships trophy won by Penticton

As past president of the CAHA, Grimston remained involved on the committee to negotiate agreements with the NHL. His contributions to building ice hockey were recognized with the Amateur Hockey Association of the United States citation award in 1952, and the Ontario Hockey Association Gold Stick Award in 1953. He was also made a life member of the BCAHA, and an honorary president of the Manitoba Amateur Hockey Association.

In July 1954, the CAHA announced that the 1954 Allan Cup champion Penticton Vees were chosen to represent Canada at the 1955 Ice Hockey World Championships in West Germany. Grimston was appointed to lead a three-person committee to oversee travel arrangements for the team. Grimston felt that the Vees were strong enough to win the World Championships without the need to have the CAHA add extra players, and were aware of the style of play differences in Europe. He sought for the team to be endorsed by the entire CAHA, and felt he should not be personally blamed if they did not become world champions. Confident in the capabilities of the players on the Vees, he vetoed the import of former NHL players Bill Juzda and Bill Robinson from Winnipeg, and declined to add any current NHL players to the team. Grimston later stated, the Vees "are the fightingest team in hockey today and can do a better job of representing this country than any all-star team".

Grimston announced exhibition games for the Vees from February 16 to 23, in Paris, Düsseldorf, Berlin and Czechoslovakia, prior to the World Championships starting on February 24. He expected the team to play exhibition games against Canadian military teams stationed in Europe after the World Championships concluded. The Penticton Vees won all eight games played at the 1955 World Championships by scoring 60 goals and conceding only 6 goals, to regain the title that Canada had lost at the 1954 Ice Hockey World Championships.

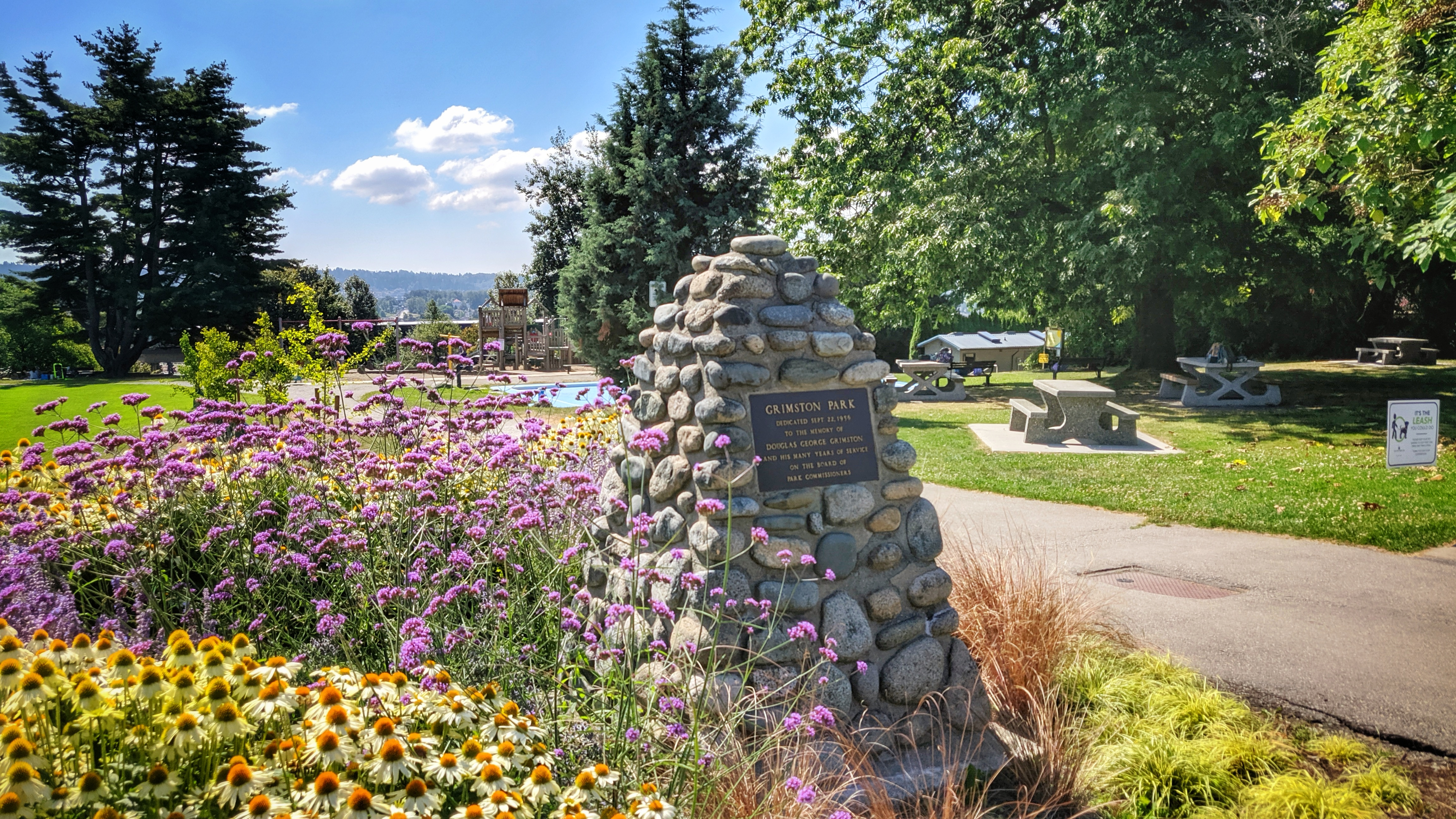
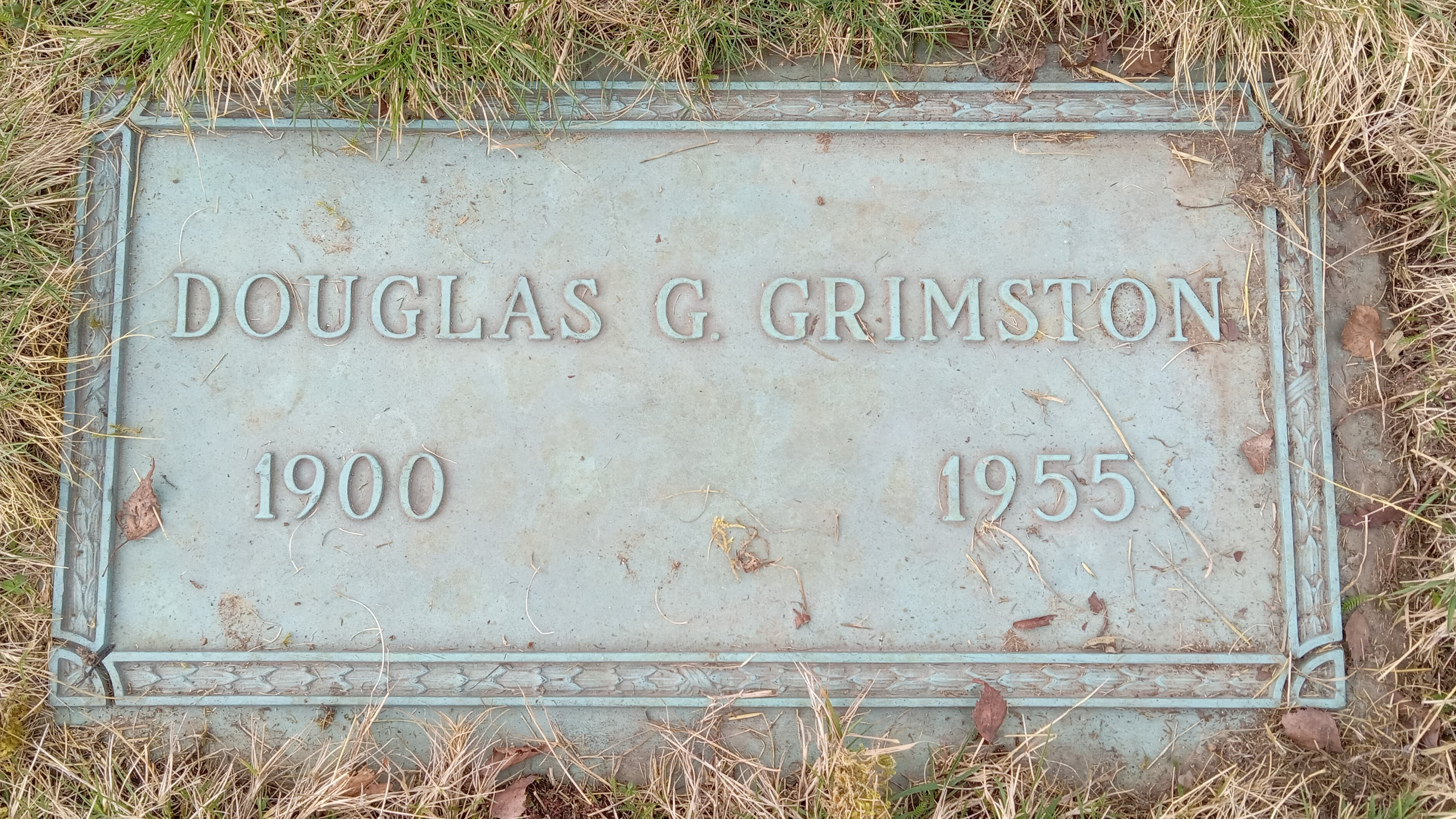
His memorials at Grimston Park and Forest Lawn Memorial Park

Grimston died at the Royal Columbian Hospital in New Westminster on September 14, 1955, following a six-month illness with colon cancer. He was interred at Forest Lawn Memorial Park in Burnaby, British Columbia.

Grimston was remembered by a front-page obituary in The British Columbian which stated, "It's difficult to say in words how this community felt about its favorite son, Doug Grimston. He was a leader in the organization and growth of Canadian amateur hockey; he assisted financially and morally - every type of sport found in the Royal City. He gave many hours and dollars to organized charities". CAHA president Jimmy Dunn described Grimston as a good friend and said he was, "one of the most colourful and aggressive presidents the CAHA ever had". The New Westminster Parks Commission renamed Westside Park in his honour to Grimston Park on November 21, 1955, and erected a memorial cairn. The BCAHA established the Doug Grimston Memorial Trophy, awarded to the champion team of the AAA bantam age group in British Columbia.
