= Alexander Cup =

Canadian former senior ice hockey trophy

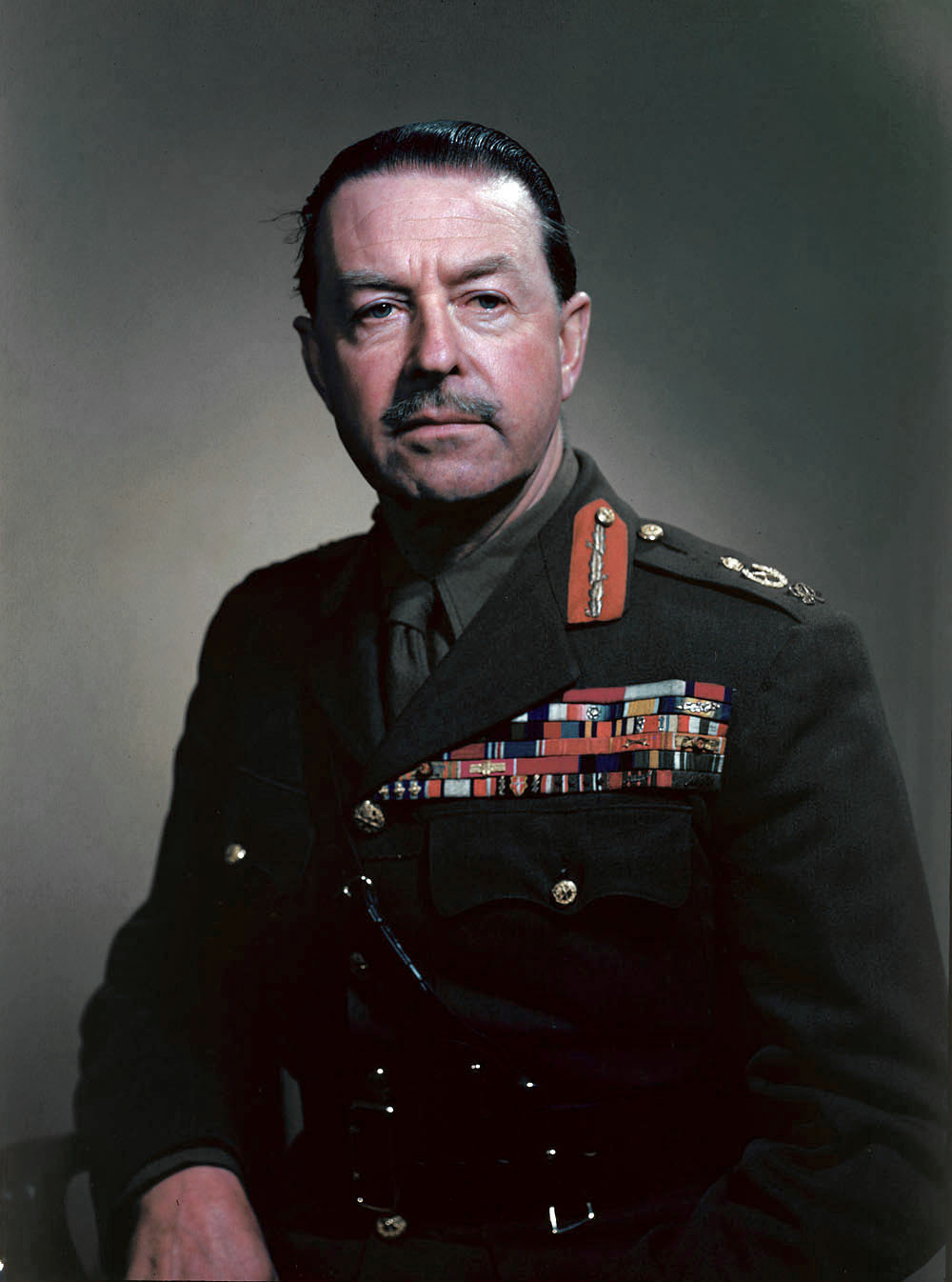
Viscount Alexander, the 17th Governor General of Canada

The Alexander Cup was the championship trophy for the Major Series of senior ice hockey in the Canadian Amateur Hockey Association from 1950 to 1954. The trophy was presented by its namesake, the Viscount Alexander as the 17th Governor General of Canada.

== Background ==
The Canadian Amateur Hockey Association (CAHA) general meeting in 1947 considered a proposal for a higher level of senior ice hockey competition since a small group of teams were dominating the Allan Cup playoffs. At the 1948 general meeting, the CAHA considered proposals to semi-professionalize player contracts. In 1950, the Western Canada Senior Hockey League, the OHA Senior A League, the Quebec Senior Hockey League, the Maritime Major Hockey League, and the Cape Breton Senior Hockey League, requested a new deal with the CAHA and complained that their players were too costly to obtain and could easily leave since no contractual commitment was required.

== History ==
At the 1950 general meeting, the CAHA decided that its five best calibre senior leagues would compete for a new trophy at a higher level than the Allan Cup. CAHA president Doug Grimston supported the concept as a way to stabilize Allan Cup competition, and insisted that the proposed contract have a termination clause, and wanted to resolve the differences since he felt that the leagues might break away from the CAHA and become professional without an agreement in place. The CAHA agreed on contracts for senior hockey which tied players to a team for the season, gave the first right of refusal to the same for the following season, and proposed that professional teams could draft senior players.

In July 1950, Grimston announced that the CAHA would operate a Major Series in a similar east-versus-west playoffs format as the Allan Cup. The CAHA set a minimum salary of C$1,000 per player, and allowed teams in the Maritimes to import an additional four players from outside of their territory to strengthen perceived weaker teams. The National Hockey League (NHL) did not approve of the Major Series proposal, since it meant they would lose control of players already on reserve lists. The decision indefinitely deferred the Major Series.

In September 1950, Grimston announced the revival of the Major Series including the same five leagues. In November 1950, he announced the Alexander Cup would be the championship trophy of the Major Series, as presented by the Viscount Alexander, the 17th Governor General of Canada. Players in the Major Series were not signed to contracts as originally proposed, and the CAHA reached an agreement with the NHL which limited the number of players that could be drafted.

The CAHA continued the Major Series for a second season, and required its leagues to post a $5,000 bond and guarantee a champion by a national deadline. Only the Quebec Senior Hockey League and the Maritime Major Hockey League would play in the Major Series for the 1951–52 season. The CAHA ratified an agreement reached with the NHL which set a deadline of January 15 for drafting players from the Major Series with exceptions only for emergency replacements. The deal avoided the loss of players for the playoffs. The Quebec Senior Hockey League demanded a better deal to remain amateur and part of the Major Series and later chose to leave CAHA jurisdiction, become professional and discontinue competition for the Alexander Cup.

CAHA president W. B. George announced that the Alexander Cup was to be retired due to the lack of interest. By October 1953, four of the original five leagues which competed for the trophy had withdrawn with only the Maritime Major Hockey League remaining. George ruled out competing for the Allan Cup due to the semi-professional nature of the league and suggested a different trophy be awarded. Teams in the Maritimes accused George and the CAHA of trying to scuttle the league, and a compromise was reached where only the Maritime Major Hockey League competed for the Alexander Cup during the 1953–54 season. The Maritime Major Hockey League folded after the 1953–54 season.

In 2006, the Alexander Cup was awarded to the Saint John Scorpions as the 2005–06 champions of the Canadian Elite Hockey League.

== Champions ==
List of Alexander Cup champions:

- 1951 Alexander Cup: Valleyfield Braves, Quebec Senior Hockey League
- 1952 Alexander Cup: Quebec Aces, Quebec Senior Hockey League
- 1953 Alexander Cup: Halifax Atlantics, Maritime Major Hockey League
- 1954 Alexander Cup: Halifax Atlantics, Maritime Major Hockey League
- 2006 Alexander Cup: Saint John Scorpions, Canadian Elite Hockey League
