= Ontario Agricultural College =

Agricultural school in Ontario, Canada

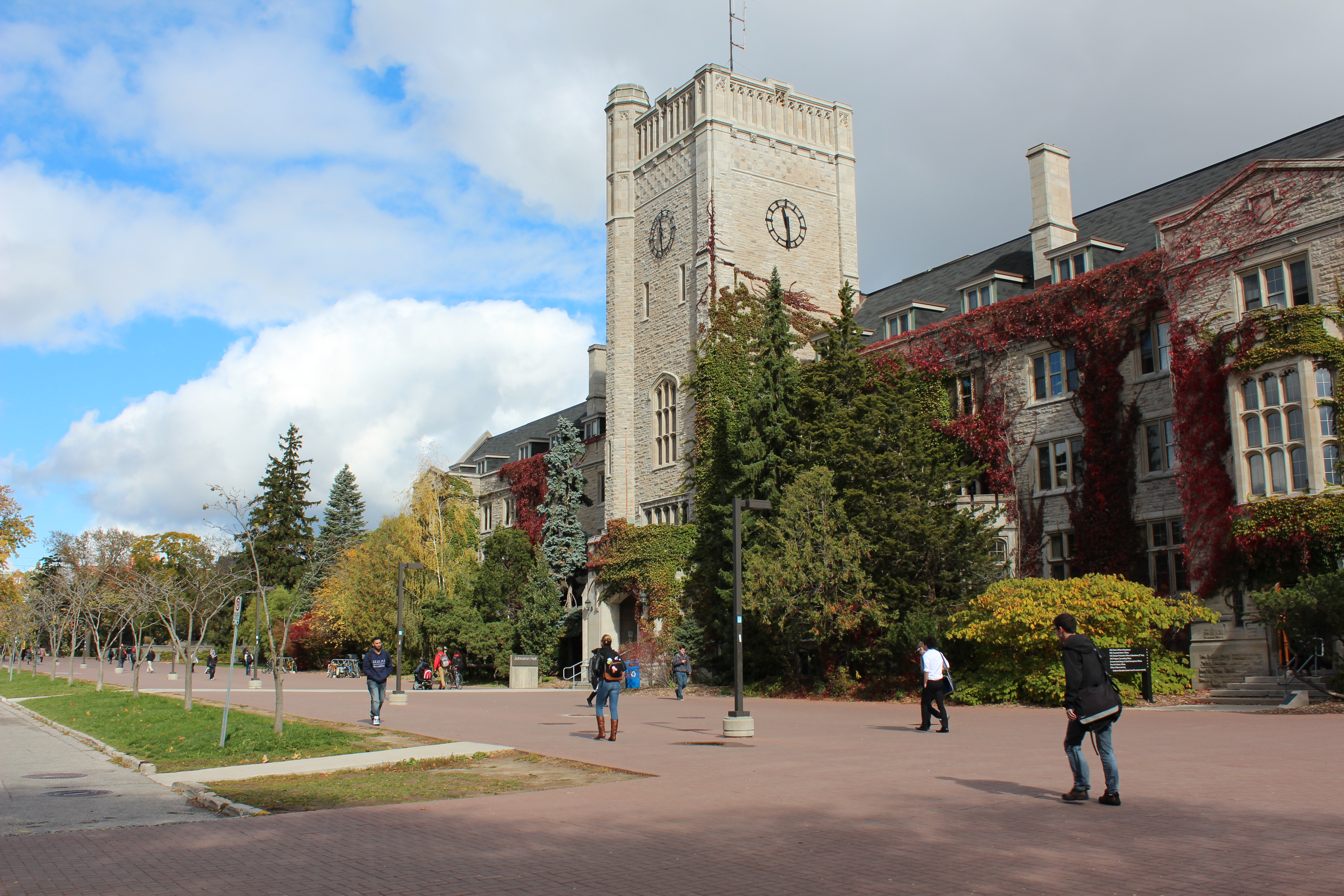
- Johnston Hall, University of Guelph
- Type: Public agricultural college
- Established: 1874; 152 years ago
- Affiliations: CUSID, UACC, ACCC, CCAA, University of Guelph
- Dean: John Cranfield
- Undergraduates: 2,000
- Postgraduates: 680
- Location: Guelph and Ridgetown (formerly Alfred and Kemptville), Ontario, Canada
- Website: uoguelph.ca/oac

The Ontario Agricultural College (OAC) originated at the agricultural laboratories of the Toronto Normal School, and was officially founded in 1874 as an associate agricultural college of the University of Toronto. Since 1964, it has become affiliated with the University of Guelph, which operates campuses in Guelph and Ridgetown and formerly in Alfred and Kemptville, all in Ontario.

== History ==
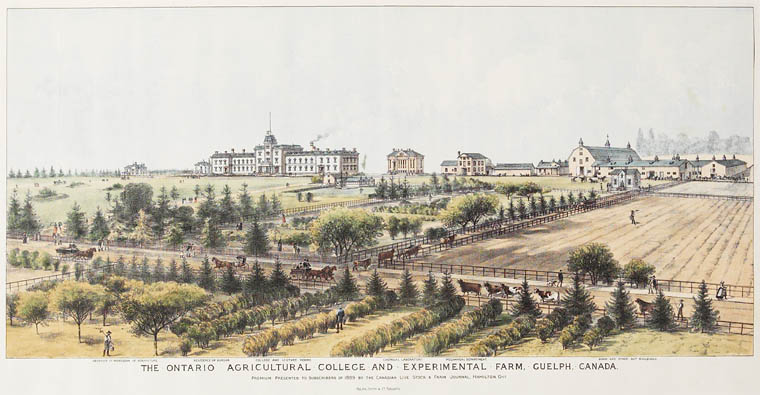
The Ontario Agricultural College and Experimental Farm, Guelph, Canada, 1889

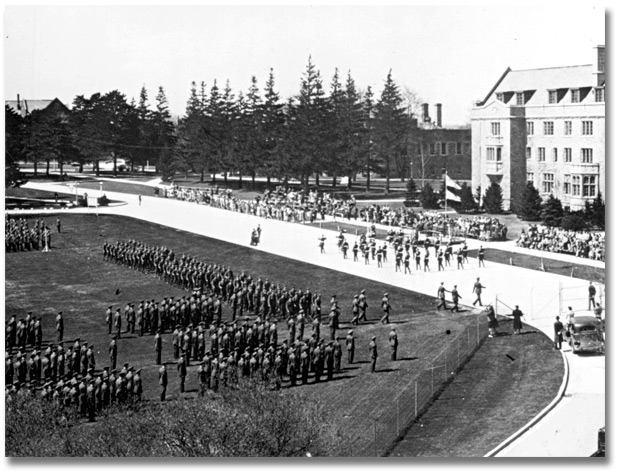
Special review day at Ontario Agricultural College, Guelph, Ontario ca. 1939-46

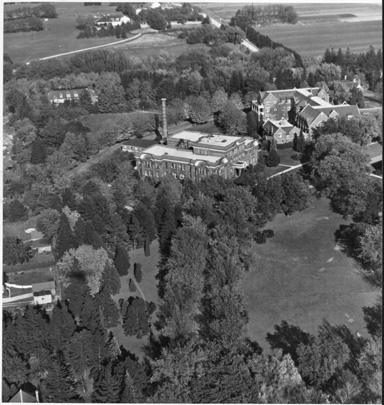
MacDonald Institute, Ontario Agricultural College, Guelph, Ontario

Ontario farmers increasingly demanded more information on the best farming techniques which led to farm magazines and agricultural fairs. In 1868 the assembly created an agricultural museum, which morphed into the Ontario Agricultural College in Guelph in 1874. Its first building was Moreton Lodge, located where Johnston Hall now stands, which included classrooms, residences, a library, and a dining room. (Several buildings constructed during this time period are still a part of campus life today, including President's Residence, Raithby House, and Day Hall.)

The War Memorial Hall is a landmark building built in June 1924 as a lecture hall or theatre at the Ontario Agricultural College to honour students who had enlisted and died in the First World War, and in the Second World War. Two bronze tablets in the Memorial Chapel remembers alumni who have died during these wars.

Subsequently, the Ontario Agricultural College (OAC) became one of three founding colleges of the University of Guelph in 1964. (The other two were the Ontario Veterinary College and the Macdonald Institute.)

The OAC opened on May 1, 1874, with an enrollment of 28 students. The OAC administration was housed in Moreton Lodge until 1931, when the building was torn down to make way for Johnston Hall. The OAC's offices have resided in Johnston Hall ever since.

=== Milestones ===
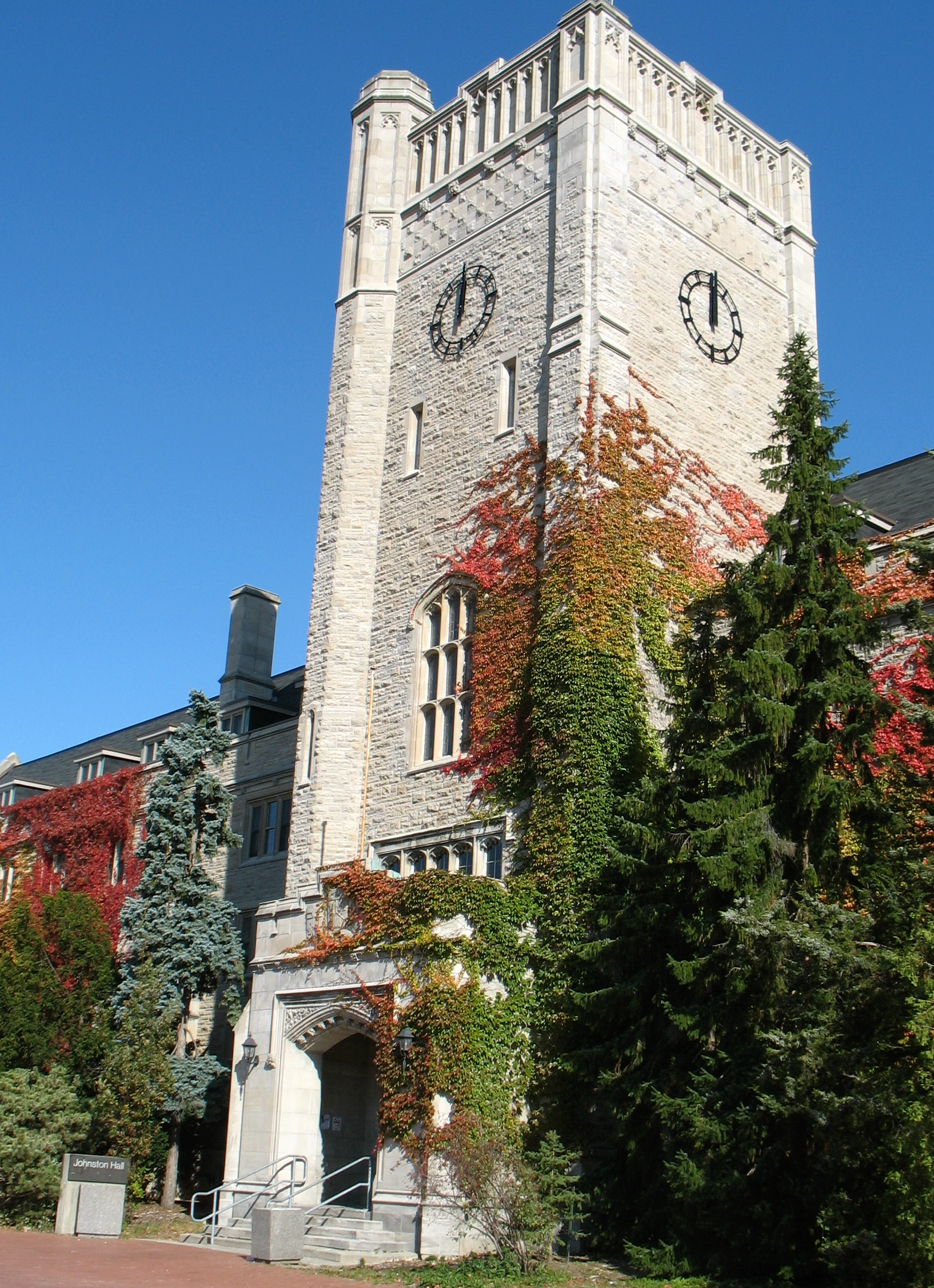
Johnston Hall Clock Tower, University of Guelph

- 1874 – The first class of 20 Ontario School of Agriculture diploma students are accepted.
- 1877 – The one-year diploma program expanded to two years.
- 1880 – School's name changed to the Ontario Agricultural College.
- 1887 – BSA degree program begins (University of Toronto awards the degrees from 1888 until 1964).
- 1891 – Short courses offered to general public.
- 1901 – Degree program adds a fourth year (still a U of T degree).
- 1926 – Graduate program begins.
- 1964 – Formation of the University of Guelph.
- 1965 – The Bachelor of Landscape Architecture begins.
- 1988 – Bachelor of Commerce and Bachelor of Environmental Science programs begin.
- 1995 – "Experience Agriculture" curriculum for B.Sc.(Agr) program begins.
- 1997 – Agricultural colleges in Kemptville, Ridgetown and Alfred affiliate with OAC and the University of Guelph becoming campuses of the University of Guelph.
- 2006 – The Faculty of Environmental Sciences is relocated permanently to the OAC.
- 2007 – The Bachelor of Bio-Resource Management – Equine Management program begins.
- 2008 – The Bioproducts Discovery and Development Centre opens. The Guelph Centre for Urban Organic Farming opens on campus.
- 2009 – The School of Environmental Sciences is formed by a merger of the departments of Environmental Biology and Land Resource Sciences, and the Faculty of Environmental Sciences.
- 2014 – The Gosling Research Institute for Plant Preservation opens.

== Campuses ==
In 1997, the provincial government amalgamated agriculture education across the province under the University of Guelph and OAC. Three previous Colleges of Agricultural Technology were now being run by the University of Guelph and OAC: College d'Alfred, a francophone college in the eastern part of the province at Alfred, Ontario; Kemptville College, founded in 1917 and located at Kemptville, Ontario about 30 minutes south of Ottawa, and Ridgetown College at Ridgetown, Ontario founded in 1922 and located in southwestern Ontario near Chatham. In May 2007, they were renamed Campus d'Alfred, Kemptville Campus and Ridgetown Campus in order to recognize their full integration into the university. Serious changes took place in 2015 with the decision to close some OAC campuses, including the Campus of Alfred, the only francophone campus. Financial reasons and the challenge to run the same programs in multiple locations were among the reasons leading to restructuring.

== Notable alumni and faculty ==
- Tom Angus, graduated BSc 1949, credited with discovering a toxin-producing bacteria that led to the use of Bacillus thuringiensis as a pest control in forestry and agriculture. Sault Ste. Marie, Ontario, alderman from 1960 to 1991.
- Bernie Brennan, graduated 1949, Canadian Football League player for the Ottawa Rough Riders and veterinarian for Rideau Carleton Raceway
- W. B. George (1899–1972), graduated 1920s, lecturer at Kemptville Agricultural School and president of the Canadian Amateur Hockey Association
- Bill Hanley (1915–1990), studied dairy production, later worked for the Ontario Hockey Association and inducted into the Hockey Hall of Fame
- Jack Roxburgh (1901–1975), graduated 1920s, member of parliament for Norfolk and president of the Canadian Amateur Hockey Association

== Special events ==
=== College Royal ===
An annual feature of the university is its open house, known as College Royal. The event began in 1925 and now welcomes over 20,000 visitors each year. For a weekend each March, every part of the campus and its programs are exhibited to the public, from the barns to the sugar bush in the Arboretum. It is highly popular with visitors of all ages, especially families with children who take advantage of the March Break (the usual Ontario school break) to have an outing. For students, College Royal is a 12-day long experience including events such as Fashion Show, Kick-Off Pub and Super Thursday.

=== Tractor Tug for Tots ===
Tractor Tug for Tots is an event run by the Tractor Tug for Tots club of the Student Federation of the Ontario Agricultural College. The annual charity event raises funds for youth organizations each year by having teams pay to compete against each other in pulling tractors down Reynolds Walk.

=== Good Times ===
Good Times is annual banquet held for OAC students, staff, donors and alumni. The banquet includes a full dinner as well as an awards ceremony recognizing outstanding members of the OAC. Good Times is said to be a favourite event by many of the OAC ‘Aggies’.

=== LABash ===
The LABash is an annual conference originally started by three landscape architecture students at the University of Guelph. This multi-day event is coordinated for landscape architecture students from all across North America and provides students with the opportunity to discuss current landscape architecture trends while networking with fellow students and professionals.

=== Environmental Sciences Symposium ===
The Environmental Sciences Symposium is an annual event organized and hosted by students on the Environmental Sciences Student Executive (ESSE). The day brings together students, experts, and community members to learn about an environmental theme through workshops and discussions that incorporate science and social science perspectives.

== See also ==
- List of agricultural universities and colleges
