= Yvon Vautour =

Canadian ice hockey player and coach

- Born: September 10, 1956 (age 70) Saint John, New Brunswick, Canada
- Height: 6 ft 0 in (183 cm)
- Weight: 200 lb (91 kg; 14 st 4 lb)
- Position: Right wing
- Shot: Right
- Played for: New York Islanders; Colorado Rockies; New Jersey Devils; Quebec Nordiques
- NHL draft: 104th overall, 1976; New York Islanders
- WHA draft: 48th overall, 1976; Edmonton Oilers
- Playing career: 1979–1985

Yvon Jean Vautour (born September 10, 1956) is a Canadian former ice hockey coach and former National Hockey League player.

== Playing career ==
As a youth, Vautour played in the 1969 Quebec International Pee-Wee Hockey Tournament with a minor ice hockey team from Saint John, New Brunswick.

Vautour was drafted by the New York Islanders 104th overall in the 1976 NHL Amateur Draft. He played junior hockey with Mike Bossy for the Laval National of the Quebec Major Junior Hockey League.

== Coaching career ==
Vautour was an assistant coach with the Saint John Flames of the American Hockey League from 2001 – 2003. He was the head coach of the Saint John Scorpions for the 2005-06 season, guiding the team to win the Canadian Elite Hockey League championship. Vautour was hired by the Vancouver Canucks as an amateur scout for the 2007–08 NHL season, and he joined the coaching staff of the Saint John Sea Dogs on May 21, 2009.

=== Regular season and playoffs ===
			Regular season					Playoffs
Season	Team	League	GP	G	A	Pts	PIM	GP	G	A	Pts	PIM
1971–72	Saint John Schooners	NBJHL	40	13	15	28	96	—	—	—	—	—
1972–73	Saint John Schooners	NBJHL	40	42	31	73	85	—	—	—	—	—
1973–74	Laval National	QMJHL	61	38	39	77	118	11	12	7	19	7
1974–75	Laval National	QMJHL	56	34	37	71	67	16	15	7	22	67
1975–76	Laval National	QMJHL	72	43	60	103	61	—	—	—	—	—
1976–77	Muskegon Mohawks	IHL	76	43	47	90	52	7	3	4	7	2
1976–77	Fort Worth Texans	CHL	—	—	—	—	—	2	0	0	0	0
1977–78	Fort Worth Texans	CHL	64	14	21	35	84	14	2	6	8	16
1978–79	Fort Worth Texans	CHL	69	20	20	40	130	5	2	1	3	15
1979–80	New York Islanders	NHL	17	3	1	4	24	—	—	—	—	—
1979–80	Indianapolis Checkers	CHL	59	27	28	55	140	7	2	5	7	11
1980–81	Colorado Rockies	NHL	74	15	19	34	143	—	—	—	—	—
1981–82	Colorado Rockies	NHL	14	1	2	3	18	—	—	—	—	—
1982–83	New Jersey Devils	NHL	52	4	7	11	136	—	—	—	—	—
1982–83	Wichita Wind	CHL	4	3	0	3	0	—	—	—	—	—
1982–83	Moncton Alpines	AHL	14	7	5	12	25	—	—	—	—	—
1983–84	New Jersey Devils	NHL	42	3	4	7	78	—	—	—	—	—
1983–84	Maine Mariners	AHL	24	8	12	20	117	—	—	—	—	—
1984–85	Quebec Nordiques	NHL	5	0	0	0	2	—	—	—	—	—
1984–85	Fredericton Express	AHL	68	7	20	27	222	4	1	1	2	26
1987–88	Saint John Schooners	NBSHL	28	17	11	28	98	—	—	—	—	—
1988–89	Saint John Schooners	NBSHL	27	17	25	42	118	—	—	—	—	—
1989–90	Saint John Schooners	NBSHL	26	5	11	16	182	—	—	—	—	—
NHL totals			204	26	33	59	401	—	—	—	—	—
