= Canadian Elite Hockey League =

Canadian semi-professional hockey league

The Canadian Elite Hockey League (CEHL) was a semi-professional hockey league that played one season in 2005–2006. The CEHL was founded by Harold MacKay, a prominent member of the local hockey community. He previously brought the expansion Halifax Mooseheads of the QMJHL to Nova Scotia in 1994 and was later responsible for moving the Granby Predateurs franchise to Cape Breton where they became the Cape Breton Screaming Eagles.

MacKay hoped to recruit players from major junior and university by giving them an opportunity to play locally and not re-locate to professional leagues in Europe or the United States. The league's champion won the Alexander Cup. Team budgets were set at $450,000 CAD and rosters were limited to a maximum of six import players.

The first league champion was the Saint John Scorpions, coached by Yvon Vautour, who won the Alexander Cup by defeating the Dartmouth Destroyers in four games. In June 2006 the Cape Breton Crush folded leaving the league with just three teams. Soon after that the league itself shut down.

== Teams ==
The charter franchises of the league were:

- Cape Breton Crush
- Dartmouth Destroyers
- Saint John Scorpions
- Summerside IceFox
