= Kemptville College =

Community college in Kempton, Ontario, Canada

Coordinates: 45°00′27″N 75°38′24″W

Kemptville Campus - closed
- Type: agricultural college
- Established: 1917
- Affiliations: ACCC, CCAA, Ontario Agricultural College, University of Guelph,
- Location: Kemptville, Ontario, Canada
- Campus: Rural Kemptville
- Colours: black ; White & yellow ;
- Website: www.kemptvillec.uoguelph.ca

Kemptville College is a community college based in Kemptville, Ontario, and was formerly a satellite campus of the Ontario Agricultural College as part of the University of Guelph.

== Programs ==
It was established in 1917 as Kemptville Agricultural School and offers programs related to agricultural and rural fields. In 1997 it affiliated with the Ontario Agricultural College at the University of Guelph, and in 2007 the institution adopted its current name as a recognition of its integration into the university.

In 2014, the University of Guelph announced that academic programmes at the Alfred and Kemptville campuses would close, once current students had completed their studies. This decision does not directly relate to separately-funded trades programmes. Efforts are underway to save the two campuses, with reports on Kemptville and on Alfred, along with initiatives with two francophone colleges, Boréal and La Cité to maintain the French-language offerings at Alfred.

== Notable faculty ==
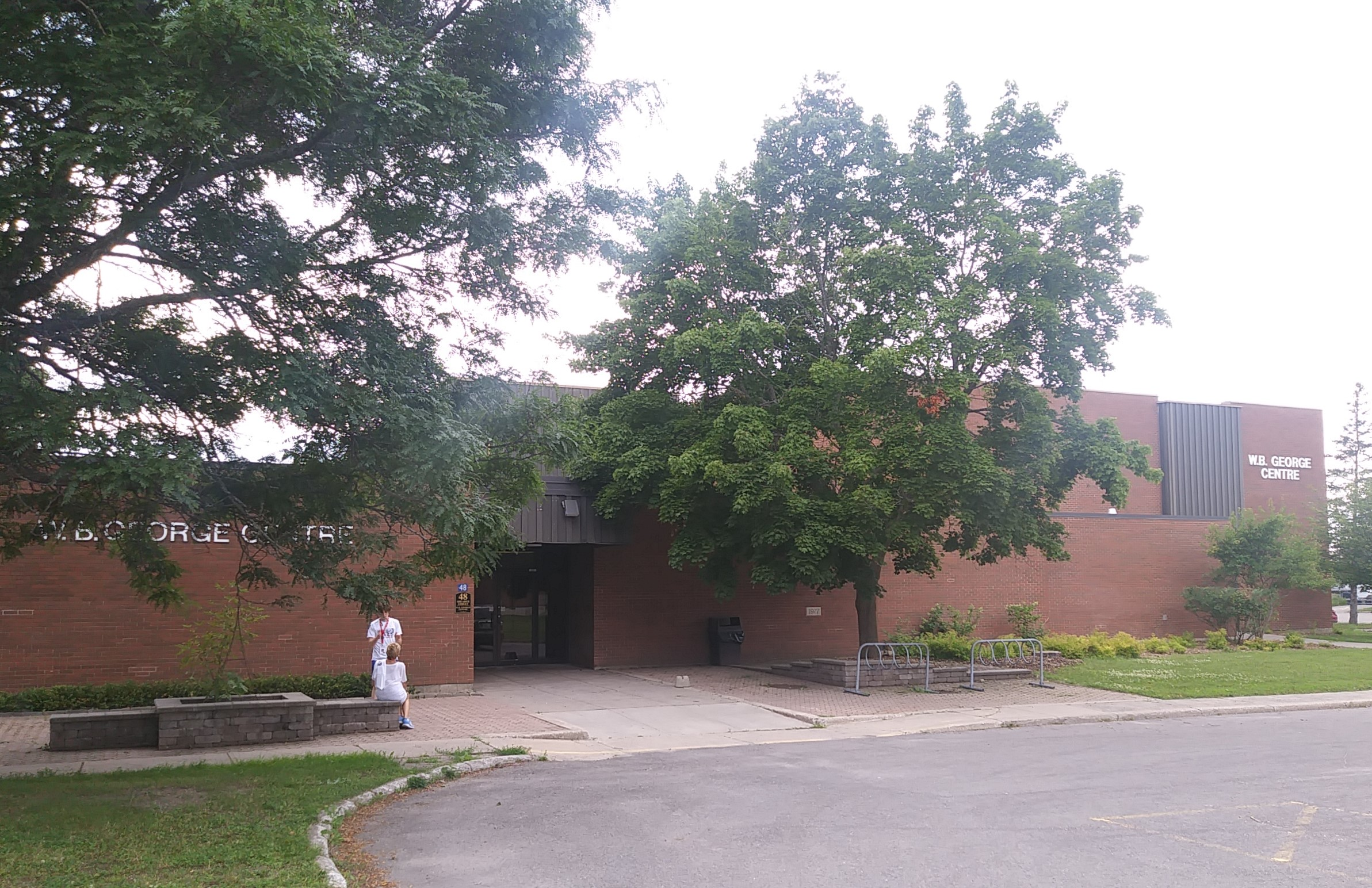
W. B. George Centre at Kemptville College

- W. B. George (1926 to 1960), Agriculturalist, head of the soil chemistry department, president of the Canadian Amateur Hockey Association and Ottawa and District Amateur Hockey Association
