= W. B. George =

Canadian sports administrator and agriculturalist (1899–1972)

- Born: William Bryden George; November 28, 1899; Highgate, Ontario, Canada
- Died: June 25, 1972 (aged 72); Kemptville, Ontario, Canada
- Education: Ontario Agricultural College
- Occupations: Soil scientist, lecturer, teacher
- Employer: Kemptville Agricultural School
- Known for: Canadian Amateur Hockey Association; Ottawa and District Amateur Hockey Association; Provincial Lawn Bowling Association

William Bryden George (November 28, 1899 – June 25, 1972), also known as Baldy George, was a Canadian sports administrator and agriculturalist. He was president of the Canadian Amateur Hockey Association from 1952 to 1955, when Canada debated whether it would withdraw from the Ice Hockey World Championships and the Olympic Games. At issue was the perceived financial exploitation of the Canada men's national ice hockey team and abuse from European media on the Canadian style of physical play. He wanted a financial guarantee for the national team when it travelled since its participation increased attendance at events in Europe. Canada did not participate at the World Championships in 1953 and placed second in 1954, which led to heavy criticism by media in Canada for the failure to win. Although Canada won the 1955 Ice Hockey World Championships, George questioned future participation and was concerned that the game in Europe took on political and religious meanings in which Canada did not want to become involved.

George's tenure as president saw a struggle for control of senior ice hockey and the imbalance of junior ice hockey in Canada. He helped negotiate the establishment of the Major Series of senior hockey which competed for the Alexander Cup at a higher level of competition than the Allan Cup, and then saw the subsequent suspension of the Quebec Amateur Hockey Association, the withdrawal of the Quebec Senior Hockey League and the end of the Major Series. He negotiated a new agreement with the National Hockey League to increase the amount of profits to be given to junior teams the league sponsored, but resisted requests to transfer talent to Eastern Canada which weakened junior teams in Western Canada during the Memorial Cup playoffs. He served 25 years on the Ottawa and District Amateur Hockey Association executive and sought to expand hockey in Eastern Ontario. He oversaw the establishment of district playoffs for minor ice hockey and welcomed teams formed of Canadian Armed Forces athletes during World War II. George served as chairman of the CAHA committee to oversee grants to develop minor hockey and how to best distribute the funds. In November 1949, he presided over the meeting which founded the Ottawa District Minor Hockey Association.

George was an Ontario Agricultural College graduate, taught at Kemptville Agricultural School for 34 years, became head of its soil chemistry department and was chairman of the Fertilizer Advisory Board of Ontario. He lectured on the importance of soil fertility and soil quality, and frequently spoke at conferences for the Eastern Ontario branch of the Agricultural Institute of Canada and the Ontario Ministry of Agriculture. He was a regular lawn bowler, and served as president of the Kemptville Lawn Bowling Club and the Provincial Lawn Bowling Association in Ontario. He oversaw implementation of uniform scoring and tournament draws, and establishment of a publicity committee and consistent advertising for the sport in Ontario. He was a founding member and a president of the Kemptville Rotary Club, and was elected Governor of District 250 of Rotary International in 1956. His community involvement also included serving as president of the local Red Cross Society and as chairman of the Kemptville District Hospital construction committee. He was posthumously inducted into the builder category of the Kemptville District Sports Hall of Fame in 2010.

== Early life and education ==
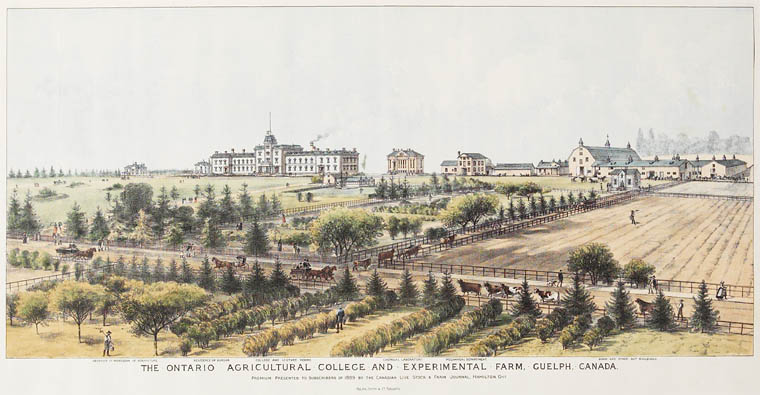
Ontario Agricultural College and the experimental farm

William Bryden George was born on November 28, 1899, in the village of Highgate, Orford Township, Kent County, Ontario, to parents Thomas Treavathen George and Rachel Ann Jamison. He was the son of a Methodist minister and was raised in small communities in rural areas of Kent County. He worked seasonally on local farms and spent one summer farming in Saskatchewan. He graduated from Thamesville High School in 1918. He attended Ontario Agricultural College where was known as "Baldy" due to having a lot of hair, and the nickname persisted throughout his professional career.

George graduated with a Bachelor of Science in Agriculture, then joined Kemptville Agricultural School in 1926, as the dean of residence and teaching courses in English and economics. He soon became involved in overseeing sporting activities at the school and directed its annual sports meet. An indoor ice rink was constructed in Kemptville in 1928, and George helped organize an ice hockey team for the school, despite not having played the game at a high level. He soon became secretary-treasurer of the local senior ice hockey team, and an ice hockey referee.

== Ottawa and District Amateur Hockey Association ==
George was elected secretary of the Rideau Group in November 1932, an ice hockey league which included teams from Kemptville, Smiths Falls, Perth and Brockville. He represented the Rideau Group at meetings for the Ottawa and District Amateur Hockey Association (ODAHA), was named to the ODAHA registration committee in November 1933, and assisted in issuing player registration cards and handling requests by former professionals to be reinstated as amateurs.

George served as vice-president of the ODAHA from November 1936 to December 1938. The ODAHA saw growth in hockey in rural areas, and planned for smaller towns and villages to form their own league within the association and introduce an intermediate level of competition. The ODAHA restored grants given to support junior ice hockey, and received applications for affiliation from two new leagues and the Eastern Ontario Secondary Schools Association.

George was elected president of the ODAHA in December 1938, at a time when the association was in its best financial situation and had its greatest number of registrations. The ODAHA declined offers from professional clubs to sponsor amateur teams, choosing to remain financially independent. The ODAHA used its wealth to establish district playoffs for the juvenile age group and arranged for an inter-provincial playoff with the juvenile champion from the Quebec Amateur Hockey Association (QAHA). The ODAHA welcomed three new intermediate leagues and the Canadian Amateur Hockey Association (CAHA) began arrangements for inter-branch playoffs at the intermediate level in Eastern Canada for the 1939–40 season.

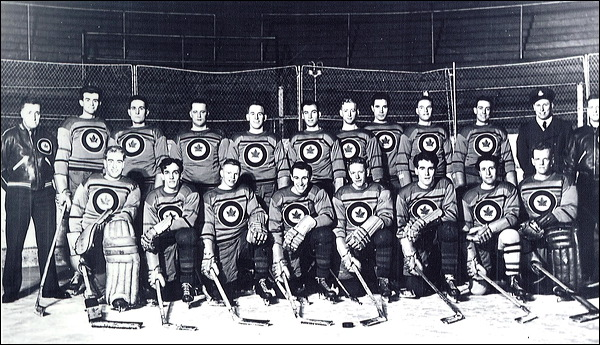
The Ottawa RCAF Flyers were one of several Canadian military sports teams based in Ottawa during World War II.

World War II reduced the number of players in the ODAHA by almost half due to Canadian Armed Forces enlistments, with the biggest decrease noticed in senior hockey leagues. When the Ottawa City Junior Hockey League disbanded midway during the 1939–40 season, George arranged a meeting to merge all of the district's remaining teams into the Ottawa and District Junior Hockey League. The ODAHA welcomed having teams formed entirely of military athletes, and allowed for civilian teams to get roster replacements for players who had enlisted. George and the ODAHA pushed ahead with minor ice hockey in the district which had continued to expand.

In April 1940, the CAHA and the Amateur Hockey Association of the United States (AHAUS) agreed to form a new governing body known as the International Ice Hockey Association, and invited the British Ice Hockey Association to join. CAHA president W. G. Hardy stated the new body was to promote and to govern international hockey since the Ligue Internationale de Hockey sur Glace had become inactive during the war. A constitution for the new association was delegated to a committee including George and future CAHA president Hanson Dowell.

At the 1942 CAHA general meeting, George was named chairman of the committee for grants to minor hockey. He stressed that the CAHA had a duty to foster the development of youths in Canada, and recommended that C$1,000 be granted to each of the CAHA branches to promote minor hockey. The meeting approved his recommendations with additional money for the Prairie Provinces to offset their greater travel costs. George also chaired the sub-committee to study financial reports from the branches and recommend how to best distribute the funds, and was empowered to increase or decrease the granted amounts.

George was succeeded by Lorenzo Lafleur as president at the end of the 1942–43 playoffs. Minor hockey continued to grow and the ODAHA implemented plans for playoffs to have district champions at the bantam, midget and juvenile age groups. George oversaw a zone that included minor hockey teams in Kemptville and towns along the Prescott Highway. He was a director for the Kemptville Community Hockey League, then became involved in operating the St. Lawrence Junior Hockey League and was its representative at district meetings. He returned to the ODAHA executive committee in December 1946, when elected as the secretary-treasurer assistant to Cecil Duncan. George was elected treasurer of the ODAHA in December 1947, and served in the role continuously until 1966.

== Canadian Amateur Hockey Association ==
=== Second vice-president ===
The Allan Cup was the championship trophy for amateur senior ice hockey overseen by the CAHA.

George was elected second vice-president of the CAHA on April 28, 1948, when he defeated Ontario Hockey Association (OHA) president George Panter by a small margin. George was named to the negotiating committee for the professional-amateur agreement between the National Hockey League (NHL) and the CAHA. The agreement included an annual $31,000 grant from the NHL, which the CAHA distributed most of to its branches for the promotion and development of minor ice hockey. George oversaw senior playoffs for the Allan Cup, and junior playoffs for the Memorial Cup in Eastern Canada, and presented the 1949 Allan Cup trophy to the Ottawa Senators who won the first senior championship title by an Ottawa team in 41 years.

George was re-elected in June 1949. In November 1949 in Kemptville, he convened and presided over the meeting which founded the Ottawa District Minor Hockey Association to govern minor ice hockey in the Ottawa District, and was named the registrar of the new association. He directed the first minor hockey school in Eastern Ontario to be held outside of Ottawa, and aimed to grow minor hockey in the district and to create mutual respect between coaches, players and referees.

=== First vice-president ===
George was elected first vice-president of the CAHA general meeting in June 1950. The same meeting saw a proposal to establish a Major Series of senior ice hockey, to be an elite level of competition higher than the Allan Cup. Five leagues which had dominated senior hockey would compete for the Alexander Cup instead. George was part of negotiations to set up the Major Series, which reached an agreement with the NHL to limit the number of players that could be drafted.

George oversaw the Barrie Flyers versus Quebec Citadels series for the George Richardson Memorial Trophy, to represent Eastern Canada in the 1951 Memorial Cup playoffs. When the Citadels refused to play game five in Barrie, George gave them an ultimatum to play or forfeit the series. Quebec decided to play too late to arrive by train, but arrived half an hour late after flying. George scheduled game seven on neutral ice at Maple Leaf Gardens, despite protests from Flyers' coach Hap Emms who claimed that his team only agreed to resume the series if game seven was played in Barrie.

George was re-elected first vice-president in May 1951, when the CAHA introduced suspensions for failure to respect on-ice officials, and ice hockey rules to reduce physical play and speed up the game. He oversaw scheduling for the 1952 Allan Cup and the 1952 Memorial Cup playoffs, and cancelled the intermediate A-level final for Eastern Canada due to the expense of hosting the event when the OHA was late in declaring a champion. George participated in negotiations with the NHL in May 1952, which agreed to a January deadline to call up players from the Major Series, and prevent the shortage of players for the Alexander Cup playoffs.

=== President ===
==== First term ====
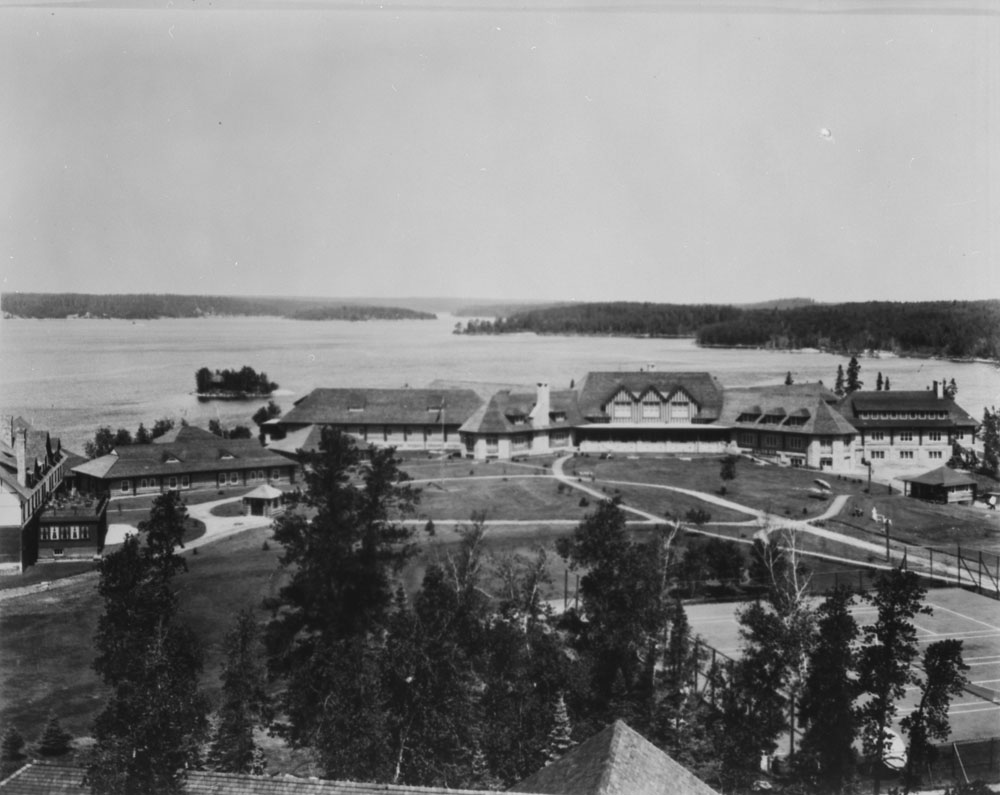
Minaki Lodge hosted the CAHA general meeting in 1952.

George was elected president of the CAHA to succeed Doug Grimston, on June 19, 1952. The CAHA wanted to balance the Memorial Cup playoffs and avoid a further talent shift in junior hockey due to requests by professional teams to transfer prospect players to teams in Eastern Canada. The CAHA declined to grant transfers for junior players from Western Canada to Eastern Canada for two seasons.

The 1952 general meeting had a lengthy discussion about the C-form, an agreement signed by an amateur player with an NHL team that promised a professional contract offer when the player turn 18 years old. The CAHA recognized that the C-form was a controversial clause since its incorporation into the professional-amateur agreement in 1947, and that it had been frequently criticized by the media, coaches and players' parents as slavery. George chaired the resolutions committee which asked for revisions to the agreement with respect to the C-form, the size of reserve lists and the right of the NHL to sponsor junior players and teams.

The Ottawa Senators contested that according to the Major Series agreement, the handling of player eligibility questions and infractions of rules should be done by the CAHA instead of the QAHA. George conducted lengthy discussions in December 1952, which resulted in recommended changes to the Quebec Senior Hockey League (QSHL) constitution and assertion of CAHA control over the Major Series. Further discussions sought protection against continued roster raiding and increases in amounts paid by professional leagues for drafting Major Series players.

The CAHA debated a recommendation from Doug Grimston that Canada withdraw from ice hockey at the Olympic Games since European tours by Canadian teams did not create goodwill, but rather led to European newspapers frequently criticizing Canadians for rough play due to body checking. This coincided with the perceived financial exploitation of the Canada men's national ice hockey team on a European tour, and the resignation of the CAHA's European representative Bunny Ahearne, who was also a travel agent and the vice-president of the International Ice Hockey Federation (IIHF). George and Tommy Lockhart issued a joint statement for the CAHA and AHAUS in August 1952, which banned Canadian and American teams from playing exhibition tours in Europe and sought financial guarantees if their respective national teams participated in future Ice Hockey World Championships. At the semi-annual meeting in January 1953, the CAHA decided not to send a national team to the 1953 Ice Hockey World Championships.

"Every year we spend $10,000 to send a Canadian team over to Europe to play 40 exhibition games [plus the World Championships]. All of these games are played to packed houses that only enrich European hockey coffers. In return we are subjected to constant, unnecessary abuse over our Canadian style of play".

— W. B. George, January 12, 1953

George attended the 1953 IIHF congress to represent both the CAHA and AHAUS to speak on guarantees against financial loss. He stated that a decision on whether or not Canada would attend the next World Championships, would be made at the 1953 CAHA general meeting, and that no replacement would be named for Ahearne until Canada resumed international tours.

==== Second term ====
The Memorial Cup was the championship trophy for amateur junior ice hockey overseen by the CAHA.

George was re-elected president in May 1953. The CAHA approved an application by the QAHA for reinstatement, after it had been suspended in February for issuing a registration certificate to Ron Attwell, who was deemed to be an invalid transfer from his team in the OHA. George criticized Montreal Canadiens' general manager Frank J. Selke for trying to circumvent CAHA legislation when he attempted to have top prospect player Attwell transferred to the QAHA. George supported the QAHA's authority to decide on an ultimatum from the QSHL, which demanded a better deal to remain amateur and part of the Major Series or to become a professional league. The QSHL chose to leave CAHA jurisdiction, become professional, and operated as the Quebec Hockey League.

In June 1953, NHL team owners gave notice to terminate the professional-amateur agreement with the CAHA. The Canadian Press reported that the decision was to protect investments into amateur teams and to improve the financial return. The NHL proposed a new national junior playoff format solely for teams sponsored by the NHL, instead of the existing Memorial Cup championship. George predicted that the NHL would not last three years without the CAHA, and stated that it would end the current system which allowed a three-game tryout for an amateur with a professional team. In August 1953, the CAHA and NHL agreed in principle to a proposal that resumed east-west transfers and increased the amount of profits to junior teams sponsored by the NHL. At the semi-annual meeting, the CAHA agreed to distribute playoffs funds proportional to the profit on a series-by-series basis, but rejected the request to resume transfers from west to east.

George attended the 1953 general meeting of the Newfoundland Amateur Hockey Association (NAHA) to extend an invitation to join the CAHA by becoming an affiliate of the Maritime Amateur Hockey Association without loss of autonomy. The NAHA deferred a decision on the invitation and did not join the CAHA until 1966.

George announced that the Alexander Cup was to be retired by the CAHA due to the lack of interest. By October 1953, four of the original five leagues which competed for the trophy had withdrawn, with only the Maritime Major Hockey League remaining. George ruled out competing for the Allan Cup due to the semi-professional nature of the league and suggested a different trophy be awarded. Teams in the Maritimes accused George and the CAHA of trying to scuttle the league, and a compromise was reached where only the Maritime Major Hockey League competed for the Alexander Cup during the 1953–54 season.

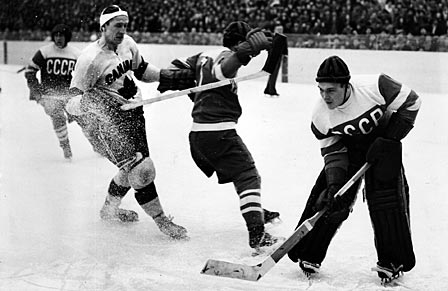
Canada versus the Soviet Union at the 1954 Ice Hockey World Championships

The CAHA chose the East York Lyndhursts to represent Canada at the 1954 Ice Hockey World Championships, and the Kenora Thistles to tour Japan in March 1954. The CAHA had been unable to find a senior or junior A-level team for international competitions in 1954, and settled on the senior B-level team from East York and the intermediate-level team from Kenora. George stated that East York and Kenora were the only two teams willing to play internationally and that East York was the stronger of the two teams.

The East York Lyndhursts lost by a 7–2 score in the final game versus the Soviet Union national ice hockey team and placed second at the World Championships. George stated that the final game was the worst he had seen the Lyndhursts play and that they seemed afraid of being penalized. The CAHA was heavily criticized by media in Canada for the failure to win the World Championships, and writer Michael McKinley stated the loss was a "day of reckoning" and a symbol of what went wrong with the CAHA's international strategy.

George felt that the Lyndhursts lacked the experience necessary to deal with the political situation in Europe, and believed that much of the criticism by newspapers in Sweden had been anti-Canadian propaganda. He recommended that Canada continue to play at the World Championships, and denied reports from East York's manager that spectators in Sweden treated the Canadian team unfairly.

George was convinced by the loss that experience was needed in a team to represent Canada internationally, but that finding the best players was a recurring problem due to disagreements with the international definition of an amateur. He felt a stronger national team was needed to continue at the World Championships and expected the CAHA to find a new formula to financially support future national teams.

==== Third term ====
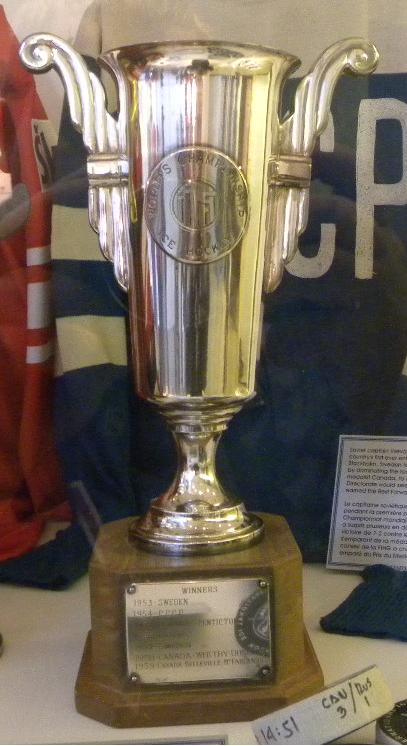
Ice Hockey World Championships trophy won by Penticton

George was re-elected CAHA president in May 1954. In August 1954, he was named to the executive committee of the IIHF for a three-year term until 1957.

George attended a meeting in August 1954, with junior hockey representatives from the five CAHA branches in Western Canada in addition to the Western Canada Junior Hockey League and the Saskatchewan Junior Hockey League. Western Canada sought permission for any of its league champions to add three players in the inter-provincial playoffs for the Memorial Cup. They contended that the imbalance in competition compared to Eastern Canada teams had caused lack of spectator interest and less prestige for the event, and suggested that the Abbott Cup champion to have an additional three players added for the Memorial Cup final. Representatives also asked for a Western Canada Junior Hockey Association to be formed and recognized by the CAHA, and for the richer teams in Eastern Canada to pay proportionally more than poorer teams in Western Canada with respect to the overall CAHA budget. George suggested that the western branches submit requests for transfers to the upcoming CAHA general meeting, but felt that Eastern delegates would resist the increased cost burden.

At the next CAHA meeting in January 1955, the request for three additional players for the Abbott Cup representative in the Memorial Cup final was approved. The CAHA reduced its annual operating budget from $70,000 to $55,000, abolished its scholarships for the finer arts, and stipulated that future scholarships must be for hockey players and their education. The CAHA also debated funding for the national team. George was opposed to siphoning funds from senior and junior teams to pay travel expenses to the World Championships, and stated that countries should consider paying the Canadian team for appearing at the World Championships. He felt that Canada had to attend at 1955 World Championships regardless of the expense, but that the future events needed a better financial arrangement.

George announced that the Penticton Vees who won the 1954 Allan Cup, were selected to represent Canada at the 1955 Ice Hockey World Championships. He felt that Penticton was far superior to the East York team and was strong enough to defeat the Soviet Union. He was against adding extra players to Penticton since it might affect the morale of the players who won the Allan Cup.

The Canadian Press reported that George requested a network to spy on the Soviet Union national team. Intelligence reported included accounts by Canadians who played hockey in Europe and attended the Soviet Union's games. After a Canadian exhibition game versus the Czechoslovakia national team, George discounted reports dispatched from Prague and printed in the Daily Worker in London as exaggerated, and denied that Penticton's style of play was "thuggery-on-ice". He also criticized media in Canada for distorting the playing conditions in Europe and felt that players on Penticton had conducted themselves appropriately.

Penticton won the 1955 World Championships with a 5–0 victory over the Soviet Union in the decisive game. George felt that the final game was "played as hockey should be played" and hoped that European teams would copy the Canadian style of play. Despite the victory, the Canadian Press reported sentiments from Canadian players and spectators that "Canada should never again take part in the tournament under its present setup". George questioned whether Canada would participate in future World Championships and was concerned that the game in Europe took on political and religious meanings in which Canada did not want to become involved. He was open to the CAHA sending a team on a tour of the Soviet Union if an invitation was received soon enough to rearrange league schedules and if adequate financial compensation was provided.

The CAHA agreed on attending ice hockey at the 1956 Winter Olympics at its next general meeting. George felt that Canada was obliged to send a team to the Olympics, but continued to advocate for a better financial arrangement at the World Championships. He felt that Canadian teams were exploited due to the difficulty in transferring money out of countries in Europe in spite of its participation being a boost to attendance at the event. He was succeeded by Jimmy Dunn as the CAHA president in May 1955, and served as chairman of the 1956 Eastern Canada playoffs as the past-president.

== Lawn bowling administrator ==
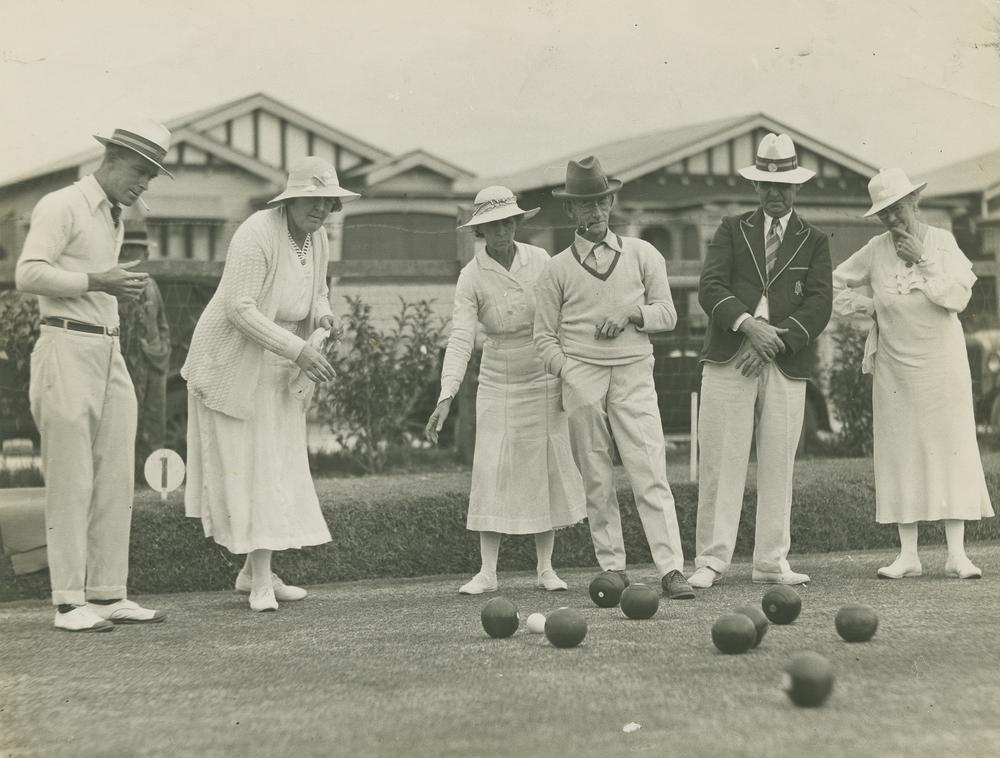
Lawn bowling c. 1934

George was a regular lawn bowler. He served as president of the Kemptville Lawn Bowling Club from 1931 to 1933, when it became affiliated with the Provincial Lawn Bowling Association (PLBA) of Ontario. He later served as the club's secretary-treasurer and delegate to PLBA meetings, and was appointed a member of the Kemptville Community Park Commission to represent lawn bowling.

George became the lawn bowling chairman of District 16 in Eastern Ontario, and established the W. B. George Trophy in 1939, that was awarded to the winner of the doubles competition for the district. He was elected president of the St. Lawrence Lawn Bowling League in May 1940, and grew the league to seven clubs by adding Cornwall and invited Perth to be the eighth member.

George was elected vice-president of the PLBA in May 1941. He was named to the Ontario provincial team to play matches versus the American Lawn Bowling Association at the international tournament hosted in Kitchener in 1941.

George was elected president of the PLBA in November 1941, at a time when its membership had remained steady despite the war-time conditions. He expected an increase in lawn bowling clubs due to the desire for a new recreational hobby closer to home since travel was difficult with gasoline rations during the war. His tenure as president saw increased attendance at meetings and completing more business than before. The PLBA implemented uniform scoring and draws in tournament play, and limited the number of games which teams could be asked to play. A publicity committee was formed which ensured that tournament conditions used consistent advertising that were clear to all entrants.

George concluded two terms as the PLBA president in 1943, was re-elected president of the St. Lawrence Lawn Bowling League, then later served as the league's secretary.

== Agriculturalist and soil science lecturer ==
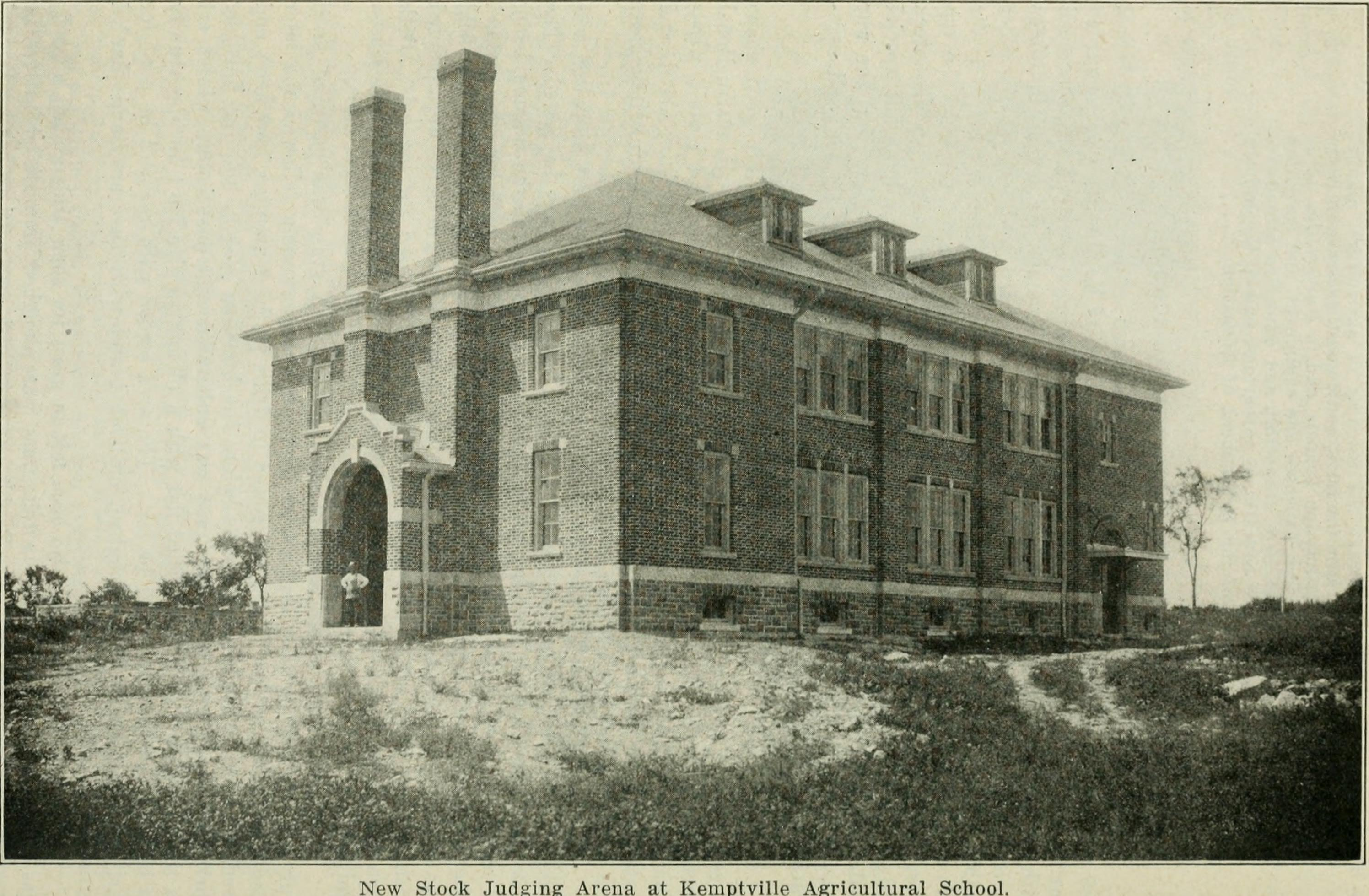
Kemptville Agricultural School

George transitioned from an English and economics teacher at Kemptville Agricultural School, to become head of the soil chemistry department and overseeing experiments and research on its experimental farm. He hosted a radio program on CFLC-AM in Brockville, and regularly spoke to the community about the goals of the college and its ability to help local farmers. He served as chairman of the Fertilizer Advisory Board of Ontario, and lectured at conferences for the Eastern Ontario branch of the Agricultural Institute of Canada and the Ontario Ministry of Agriculture.

George lectured on the importance of agriculture in Canada to increase its yields in proportion to the growing population of Canada. He argued that, "there is a direct relationship between the soil, the plant, the animal and the human being", and that programs to maintain soil fertility and soil quality were essential. He stated that Eastern Ontario farms had chemical deficiencies in nitrates, phosphates and potash, according to the results from 1,948 soil test samples conducted by Kemptville Agricultural School in 1950. He advocated for continued soil tests to determine the best practices for crop rotation to prevent loss of organic matter and nutrients, and for attention to proper drainage, fertilization and soil chemistry.

George remained active in the alumni association of the Ontario Agricultural College and was president of its Eastern Ontario branch. He was the secretary-treasurer of the Kemptville Agricultural Society from 1933 to 1936, which hosted the annual Kemptville Fair with co-operation from the Kemptville Agricultural School. He later served as secretary of the Eastern Ontario district for the Ontario Agricultural Society, and the Ontario Fairs Association. He retired from Kemptville Agricultural School after 34 years on October 1, 1960. He later taught agricultural classes at a local high school.

== Kemptville community service ==
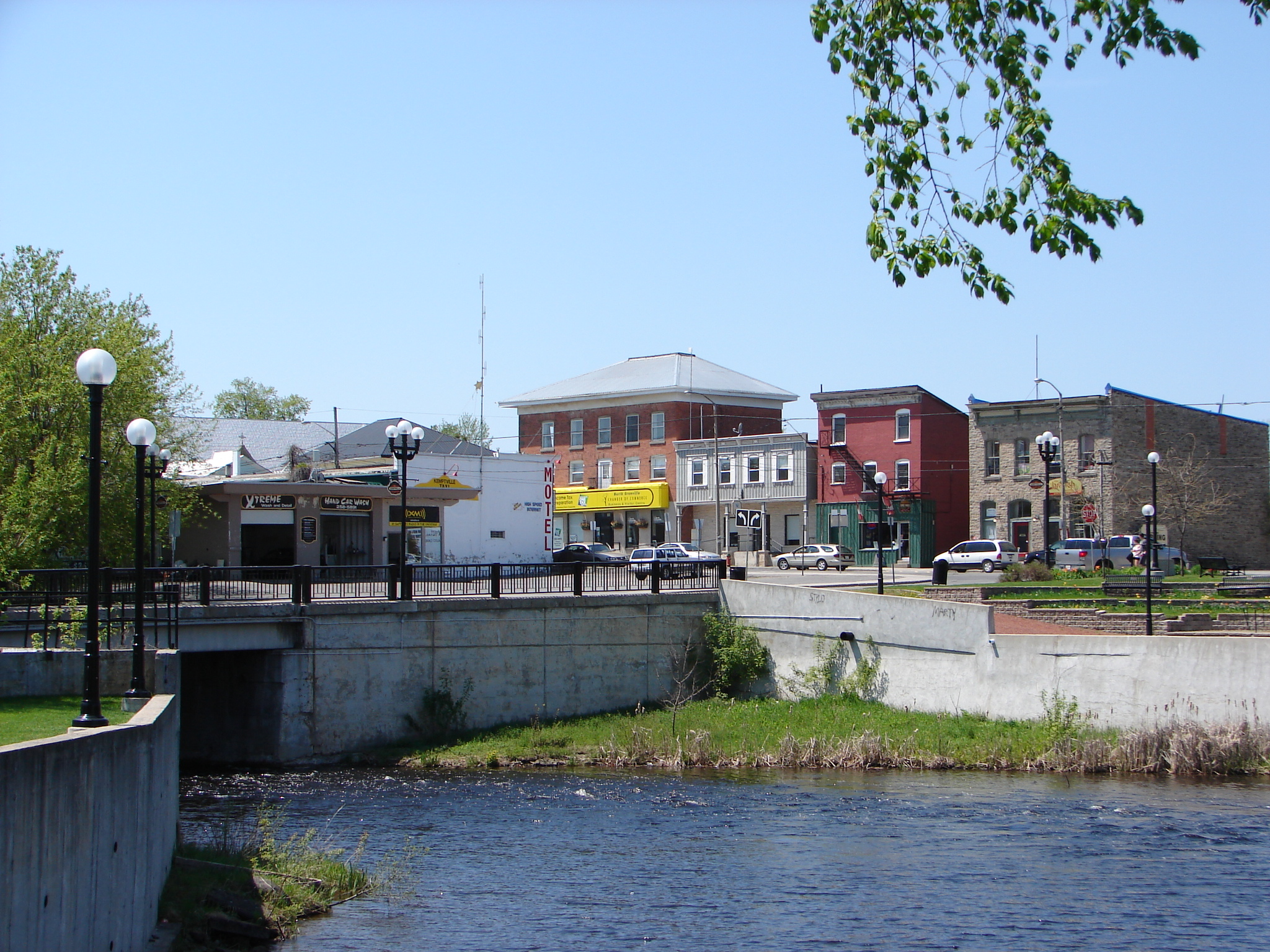
Downtown Kemptville

George served as president of the Kemptville 100 Club, a community service organization that was part of the Canadian-based International Association of 100 Clubs. He directed a play to benefit local hockey as the club's song leader, was on the board of directors for the association and arranged for Kemptville to host the international convention in 1932. The Kemptville 100 Club returned its charter in 1934, briefly became the Kemptville Community Club, then agreed to become part of Rotary International. The Kemptville Rotary Club was chartered in November 1934, and George was named its first secretary. He was unanimously elected president in August 1935, then became treasurer when his tenure as president ended in 1936, and maintained a perfect attendance at the Rotary Club for more than 35 years.

George was elected Governor of District 250 of Rotary International for the 1956–57 fiscal year, and embarked on a tour of all 50 clubs within the district that included Northern New York state, Western Quebec and Eastern Ontario. He sought for realignment of the district since it had grown beyond the Rotary standard of 35 clubs per district, and wanted to increase contributions to scholarship funds that had aided students from 61 countries to study abroad as of 1956. As the governor, he welcomed the West Ottawa Rotary Club into membership and presented their club charter.

George was a member of the Mount Zion Masonic lodge in Kemptville during the 1930s and 1940s, and ascended to be the lodge master. He was president of the Kemptville District Red Cross Society in 1943 and 1944, then later served as its treasurer. He was president of the St. John's United Church choir during the 1940s, and was the church's property committee chairman and secretary-treasurer. In July 1954, he was named chairman of the Kemptville District Hospital provisional committee which received a provincial charter to establish a local hospital. He later oversaw its construction committee and was named to the board of directors when the hospital opened on June 28, 1960. He was the business manager for the planning committee for the Kemptville Centennial week during July 1957, and produced a 158-page souvenir review that summarized the first 100 years of the town's history.

== Personal life ==
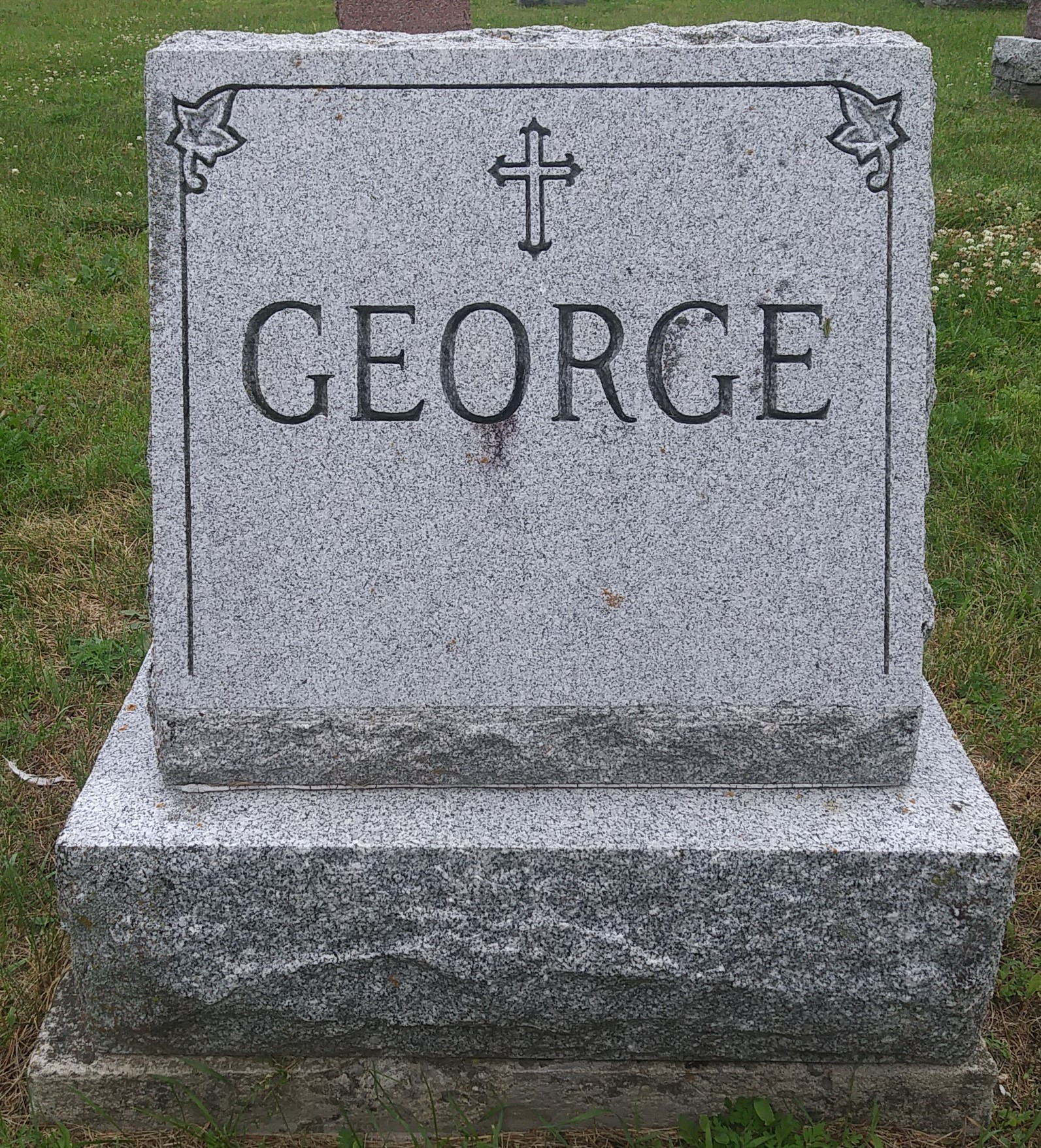
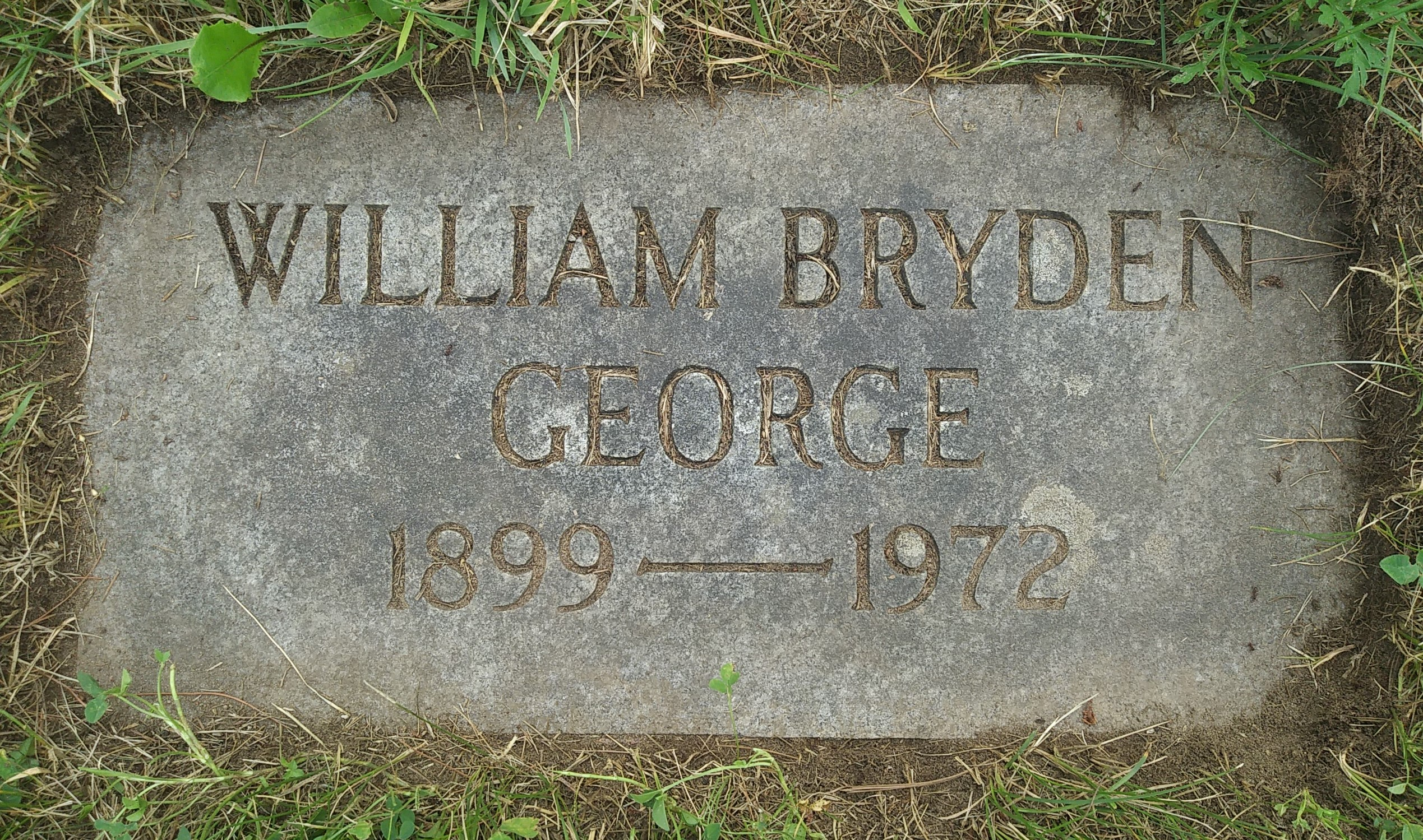
George's grave markers in Kemptville Union Cemetery

George married Ellen Elizabeth Weaver in 1930. Their only son, David George, pursued agricultural programs at the Macdonald Campus of McGill University. George stated that he had a desire to live "where there's rural atmosphere", and that his father had also preferred small towns. George's wife died on July 5, 1966. He died on June 25, 1972, at the Kemptville Hospital. They were interred together at the Kemptville Union Cemetery.

== Honours and legacy ==
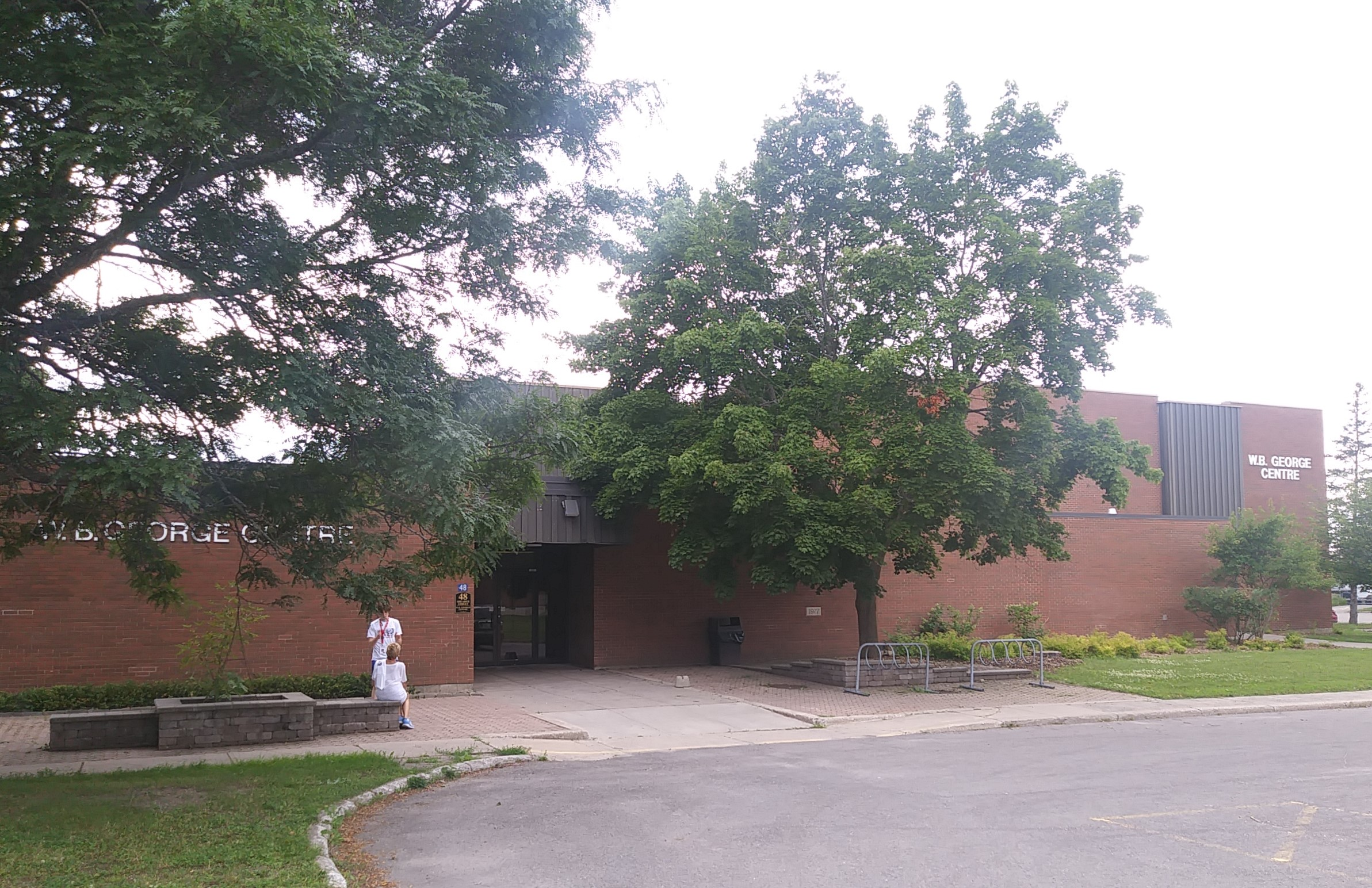
W. B. George Centre at Kemptville College

George was named an honorary president of the Manitoba Amateur Hockey Association. He received the AHAUS citation award in 1954, for contributions to the game. He was made an honorary tribal chief of the Saskatchewan Cree in May 1955, and was given the title "Chief Standing on Ice" in the same ceremony in which he presented the Athol Murray Trophy to the Qu'Appelle Indian Residential School hockey team. He was also made an honorary tribal chief of the Six Nations of the Grand River in 1956. In May 1966, he was named to the CAHA Order of Merit for service to amateur hockey in Canada.

George donated the W. B. George Award, which he annually presented to the top academic student at the Kemptville Agricultural School. In September 1977, Kemptville College dedicated a combined gymnasium and auditorium to be the W. B. George Centre. Henry Heald of the Ottawa Journal reported that during George's tenure at the school, the standard advice for a student looking to solve a problem, was to "ask Mr. George".

The Kemptville Rotary Club made him the namesake of the W. B. (Baldy) George Trophy, awarded to the champion team of its annual ice the hockey tournament. George was posthumously inducted into the builder category of the Kemptville District Sports Hall of Fame in 2010.
