= Maritime Major Hockey League =

The Maritime Major Hockey League was a semi-professional men's senior ice hockey league which operated for four seasons from 1950 to 1954, in New Brunswick and Nova Scotia. The league competed for the Alexander Cup as part of the Major Series operated by the Canadian Amateur Hockey Association (CAHA). Agreements were made with the National Hockey League to limit the number of players that could be drafted from the Major Series and the corresponding draft payment made to teams in the Maritime Major Hockey League.

CAHA president W. B. George announced that the Alexander Cup was to be retired due to the lack of interest. By October 1953, four of the original five leagues which competed for the trophy had withdrawn, with only the Maritime Major Hockey League remaining. George ruled out competing for the Allan Cup due to the semi-professional nature of the league and suggested a different trophy be awarded. Teams in the Maritimes accused George and the CAHA of trying to scuttle the league, and a compromise was reached where only the Maritime Major Hockey League competed for the Alexander Cup during the 1953–54 season.

== Teams ==
List of Maritime Major Hockey League teams:

Team name	Seasons	City
Charlottetown Islanders	1950–1954	Charlottetown, Prince Edward Island
Halifax St. Mary's	1950–1952	Halifax, Nova Scotia
Saint John Beavers	1950–1952	Saint John, New Brunswick
Moncton Hawks	1950–1952	Moncton, New Brunswick
Glace Bay Miners	1951–1954	Glace Bay, Nova Scotia
Sydney Millionaires	1951–1954	Sydney, Nova Scotia
Halifax Atlantics	1952–1954	Halifax, Nova Scotia

== Season results ==
Lists of season-by-season results:

- Legend: GP = games played, W = wins, L = losses, T = ties, GF = goals for, GA = goals against

=== 1950–51 season ===
The Charlottetown Islanders were the 1950–51 season playoffs champions.

Team name	GP	W	L	T	GF	GA	Points
Charlottetown Islanders	77	49	23	5	340	216	102
Halifax St. Mary's	78	42	33	3	328	294	87
Saint John Beavers	78	36	39	3	293	310	75
Moncton Hawks	77	20	52	5	251	392	45

=== 1951–52 season ===
The Saint John Beavers were the 1951–52 season playoffs champions.

Team name	GP	W	L	T	GF	GA	Points
Saint John Beavers	90	53	24	13	360	231	119
Charlottetown Islanders	90	42	39	9	317	316	93
Halifax St. Mary's	90	41	41	8	333	339	90
Glace Bay Miners	90	37	43	10	320	342	84
Sydney Millionaires	90	3	43	12	285	325	82
Moncton Hawks	90	30	48	12	268	329	72

=== 1952–53 season ===
The Halifax Atlantics were the 1952–53 season playoffs champions.

Team name	GP	W	L	T	GF	GA	Points
Halifax Atlantics	84	47	33	4	350	308	98
Charlottetown Islanders	84	45	35	4	307	261	94
Glace Bay Miners	84	40	40	4	278	280	84
Sydney Millionaires	84	28	52	4	228	314	60

=== 1953–54 season ===
The Halifax Atlantics were the 1953–54 season playoffs champions.

Team name	GP	W	L	T	GF	GA	Points
Halifax Atlantics	78	42	33	3	361	314	87
Sydney Millionaires	78	40	35	3	262	257	83
Glace Bay Miners	78	34	39	2	286	304	72
Charlottetown Islanders	78	33	42	0	290	324	66

== See also ==
- Bud Poile, player-coach of the Glace Bay Miners
