= Nakina =

Nakina can refer to:

Places

- Nakina, North Carolina, United States
- Nakina, Ontario, Canada
  - Nakina Airport
  - Nakina station
- Nakina River, British Columbia, Canada

People

- Nakina Smith (1913–1982), Canadian ice hockey player
