= 1932 Memorial Cup =

Canadian junior ice hockey championship

The Memorial Cup trophy

The 1932 Memorial Cup final was the 14th junior ice hockey championship of the Canadian Amateur Hockey Association. The George Richardson Memorial Trophy champions Sudbury Cub Wolves of the Northern Ontario Hockey Association in Eastern Canada competed against the Abbott Cup champions Winnipeg Monarchs of the Manitoba Junior Hockey League in Western Canada. In a best-of-three series, held at Shea's Amphitheatre in Winnipeg, Manitoba, Sudbury won their 1st Memorial Cup, defeating Winnipeg 2 games to 1.

Canadian Amateur Hockey Association president Jack Hamilton responded to threats of growing professionalism in hockey by having all players taking part in provincial finals for the 1932 Allan Cup and 1932 Memorial Cup playoffs recite an oath similar to the Olympic Oath, and declare they meet all amateur requirements. Any violation of the oath would render the player's team ineligible for the remainder of the playoffs.

== Scores ==
- Game 1: Winnipeg 4-3 Sudbury
- Game 2: Sudbury 2-1 Winnipeg
- Game 3: Sudbury 1-0 Winnipeg

== Winning roster ==
Max Bennett, Toe Blake, Borden Caswell, Maurice Dabous, Peter Fenton, Ivan Fraser, Gordon Grant, Anthony Healy, Adelard LaFrance Jr., Larry LaFrance, Jack McInnes, Robert McInnes, Red Porter, A.J. Powell, Don Price, Nakina Smith. Coach: Sam Rothschild Manager: Max Silverman
