= Exhibition Stadium (disambiguation) =

Exhibition Stadium was a stadium in Toronto, Canada.

It may also refer to:

- BMO Field, built on the same site, and called Exhibition Stadium during the 2015 Pan American Games
- Exhibition Stadium (Chilliwack), British Columbia, Canada
- Regina Exhibition Stadium, Saskatchewan, Canada
