= Al Pickard =

Canadian ice hockey administrator (1895–1975)

- Born: January 2, 1895; Exeter, Ontario, Canada
- Died: April 7, 1975 (aged 80); Exeter, Ontario, Canada
- Education: University of Western Ontario
- Occupations: Principal and schoolteacher
- Known for: President of the Canadian Amateur Hockey Association and the Saskatchewan Amateur Hockey Association
- Awards: Hockey Hall of Fame (1958)
- Military career
- Allegiance: Canada
- Branch: Canadian Expeditionary Force, Canadian Air Force
- Service years: 1918 – 1920
- Conflicts: World War I

Allan Wilfrid Pickard (January 2, 1895 – April 7, 1975) was a Canadian ice hockey administrator, who served as president of the Canadian Amateur Hockey Association (CAHA) from 1947 to 1950. When Canada opted out of the 1947 Ice Hockey World Championships and decided not to participate in the 1948 Winter Olympics, Pickard felt that Canada was obliged to send a team due to its place as a top hockey nation, and nominated the Ottawa RCAF Flyers who won the gold medal for Canada and lived up to the requirements of the Olympic Oath as amateurs. Despite disagreement with the International Olympic Committee, he sought for the International Ice Hockey Federation to adopt the CAHA definition of amateur in the face of increasing difficulty in selecting the Canada men's national ice hockey team.

Pickard was against proposals by the National Hockey League and the Ontario Hockey Association to semi-professionalize player contracts in 1948, which coincided with calls for the word amateur to be dropped from the CAHA name, and to retire the Allan Cup and Memorial Cup since the trophies were no longer perceived to represent amateur competition. Pickard sought to maintain the existing professional-amateur agreement, and keep regulations which limited player movement across Canada to suit the amateur needs. In response to alleged exploitation of players by professional teams, Pickard embarked on a campaign to establish hockey as a reputable profession with the co-operation of the Amateur Hockey Association of the United States and professional leagues. He was opposed to granting exclusive radio broadcast rights to any station for the CAHA playoffs, and wanted to see ice hockey rules more strictly enforced for player safety while condemning the failure players and coaches to respect the on-ice officials.

Pickard previously served a vice-president of the CAHA for five years, was chairman of both the finance and minor ice hockey committees, and annually sought to increase grants for the development of minor hockey in Canada. He founded a YMCA hockey league in the mid-1920s which evolved into the Regina Parks Hockey League, and later founded the Regina Aces senior ice hockey team in the late 1920s. He served as president of the Saskatchewan Amateur Hockey Association and the Saskatchewan Senior Hockey League during World War II, where he facilitated the participation of Royal Canadian Air Force and Canadian Army teams. After his time as CAHA president, Pickard served the 1950–51 season as president of the Western Canada Senior Hockey League when the Major Series of senior hockey and the Alexander Cup were introduced. He later returned as president of the Saskatchewan Senior Hockey League, then became a governor of the Western Canada Junior Hockey League and the Saskatchewan Junior Hockey League. He retired from hockey in 1955 after managing the first CAHA general meeting to be held in Saskatchewan.

Pickard was born and raised in Exeter, Ontario, and graduated from the University of Western Ontario before moving to Saskatchewan. After working for the Regina Public School Board as a school principal for 30 years, he returned to Exeter and served as the chairman of town's first planning committee. He oversaw the preparation of its zoning by-laws and development strategy, and later sat on the Ausable Bayfield Conservation Authority. Pickard was inducted into the builder category of both the Hockey Hall of Fame and the Saskatchewan Sports Hall of Fame in 1958, then was a member of the Hockey Hall of Fame selection committee.

== Early life and move to Regina ==
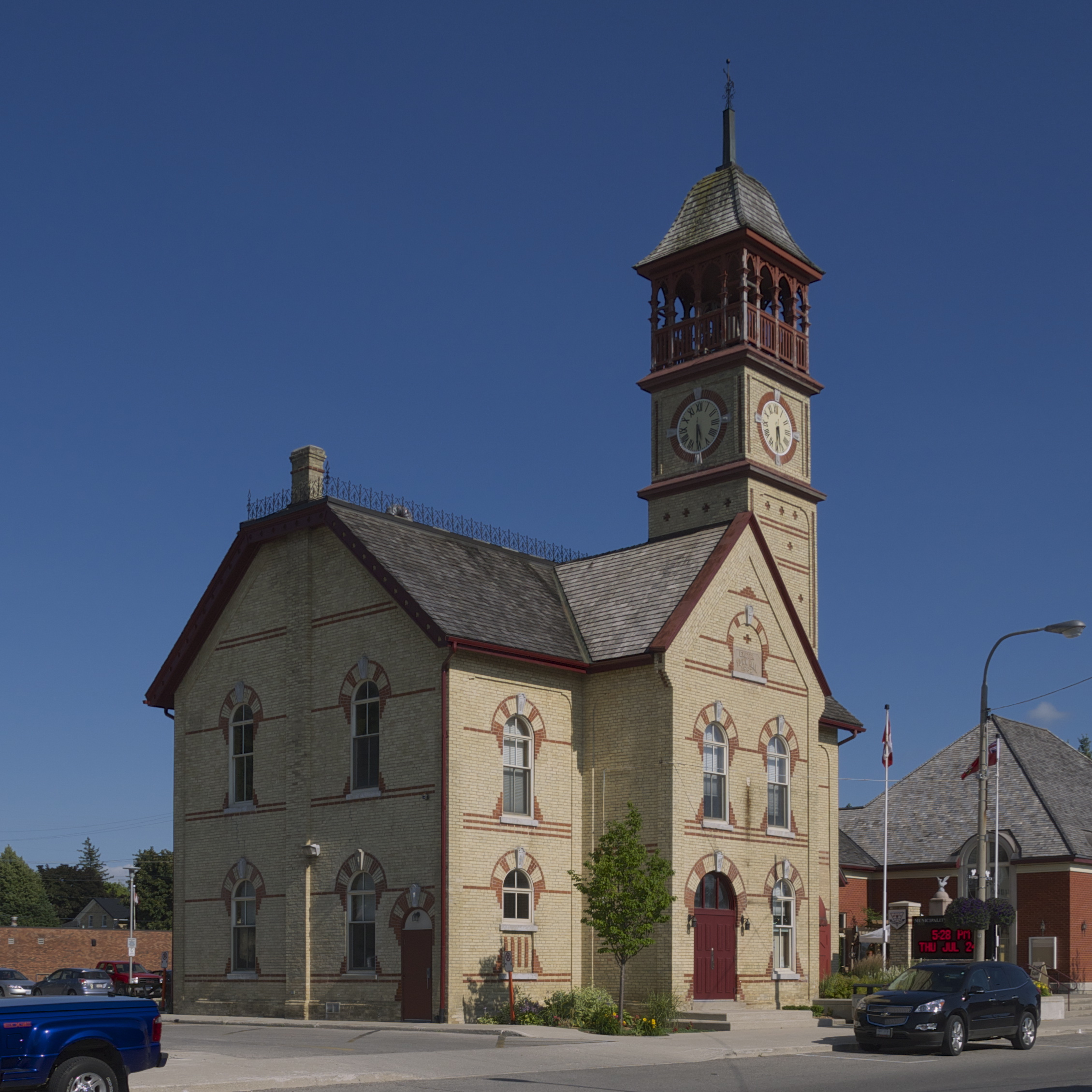
Old town hall in Exeter

Allan Wilfrid Pickard was born on January 2, 1895, in Exeter, Ontario. He was the second of three sons born to Robert E. Pickard and Elizabeth Verity. His father owned a farm near Frobisher, Saskatchewan, where Pickard worked during the summers as a youth. Pickard played minor ice hockey in Exeter, completed secondary school at the South Huron District High School, then played senior ice hockey on a combined team from Exeter and nearby Zurich, Ontario. He graduated from the University of Western Ontario and moved to Saskatchewan.

Pickard enlisted the Canadian Expeditionary Force in Regina on June 4, 1918, and served in the Canadian Air Force during World War I. His younger brother Cecil G. Pickard was killed in action in Europe. After the war, Pickard worked as a farmer, then taught school for a year in rural Saskatchewan before moving to Regina to continue as a teacher. He also taught Sunday school in Regina and was a Methodist.

== Early Saskatchewan hockey career ==
Pickard founded a hockey league based at the YMCA in Regina during the mid-1920s, which evolved into the Regina Parks Hockey League. In the later 1920s, he formed the Regina Aces senior hockey team and was its coach and president.

The Saskatchewan Senior Hockey League was formed in 1938, when teams from the north and south of Saskatchewan combined to play in one league instead of two separate groups without formal organization. Pickard became a team representative in the new league, and an executive member of the Saskatchewan Amateur Hockey Association (SAHA) from Regina. Due to a shortage of players during World War II, the Regina Aces and the Regina Victorias amalgamated into the same club for the 1939–40 season, with Pickard remaining as team president and Victorias' coach Duke Dutkowski taking over behind the bench. Pickard served as president of the Saskatchewan Senior Hockey League during the 1940–41 and 1941–42 seasons. He was also vice-president of the SAHA for the 1940–41 season, and was elected its president on October 27, 1941, to succeed Cliff Anderson.

Before the 1942–43 season, Pickard met with Lionel Conacher who indicated potential teams from the Royal Canadian Air Force which expected to operate teams based in Saskatoon and Yorkton, and the Canadian Army which might have teams in Regina and Moose Jaw. Pickard and Conacher met with local rink managers to discuss securing ice for games. Pickard was unanimously re-elected president in 1942, and the SAHA agreed to facilitate Canadian military hockey teams as much as possible since those teams would be the majority of the league. During the season, Pickard and the SAHA received complaints that boys as young as age 14 were being signed up by hockey clubs and offered $50 per week to play hockey instead of attending school. The SAHA responded with required proof of age and parental signatures for all players aged 14 years and older. Pickard was succeeded by J. H. Abbott as president in October 1943.

== Canadian hockey vice-president ==
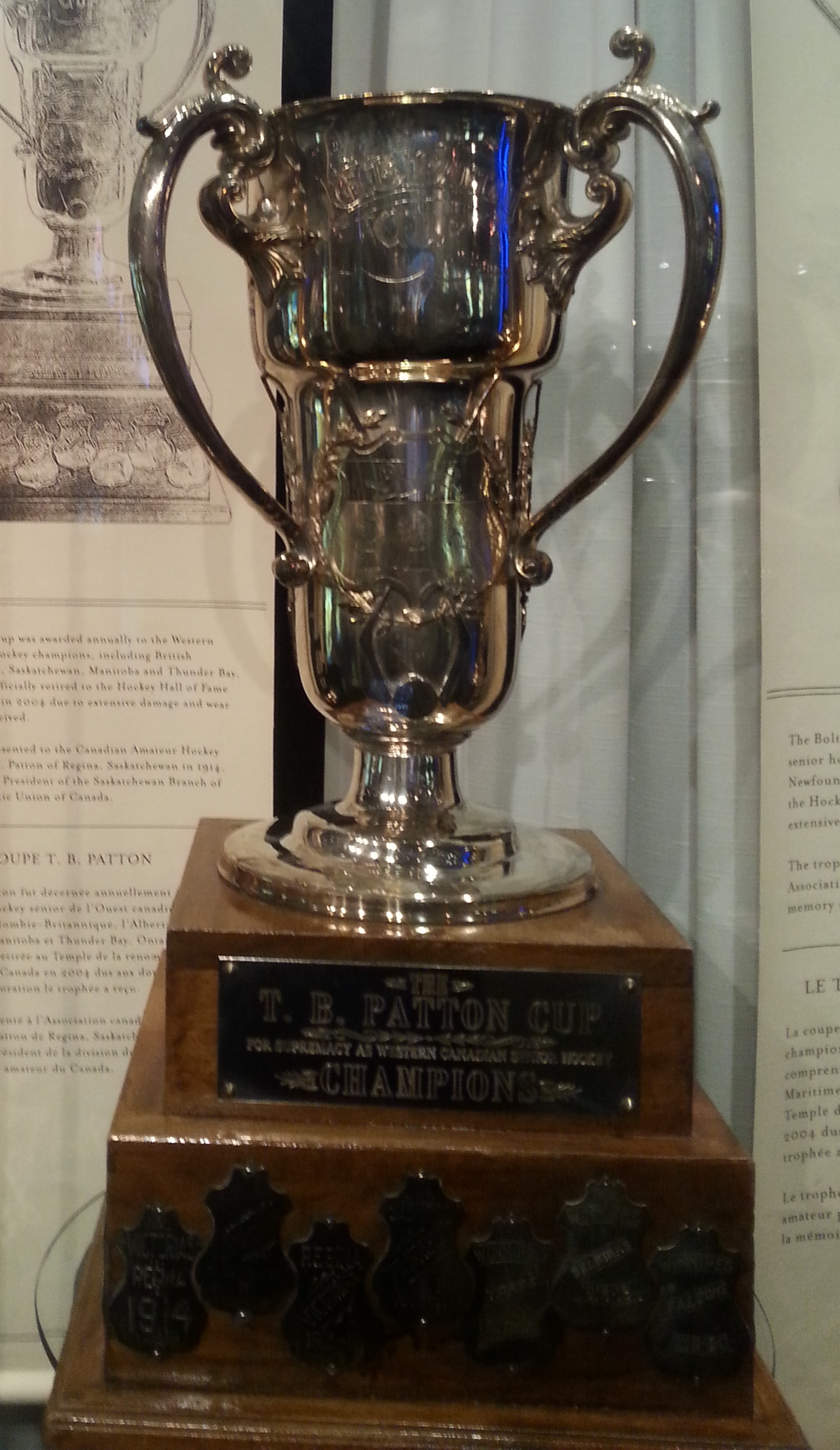
The T. B. Patton Cup was the championship trophy for amateur senior ice hockey in Western Canada.

Pickard was elected second vice-president of the Canadian Amateur Hockey Association (CAHA) in April 1942, at a time when it looked to maintain hockey during the war and reinvest profits into minor ice hockey. He annually oversaw senior and junior ice hockey playoffs in Western Canada as a vice-president.

Pickard was re-elected in April 1943, and named a trustee for the T. B. Patton Cup, the championship trophy for senior hockey in Western Canada. He was appointed chairman of the CAHA's committee to oversee and develop minor hockey with more grants. The CAHA supported the war effort with a C$5,000 donation to the Government of Canada and purchased $10,000 in Victory bonds.

Pickard was re-elected in April 1944, and continued as chairman of the finance committee and increasing grants for minor hockey. In February 1945, the physical fitness branch of the Canadian Ministry of Health announced plans to become a liaison between sports organizations and the Government of Canada. Pickard felt that the CAHA and the government could mutually work together to improve the general fitness of teenaged boys, and that junior hockey would benefit from increased interest in sport.

In 1944, the CAHA sought to establish a closer working relationship with the Amateur Hockey Association of the United States (AHAUS) and the British Ice Hockey Association (BIHA). The CAHA approved severing its relations with the Ligue Internationale de Hockey sur Glace (LIHG) which had become inactive due to the war, and recognize the International Ice Hockey Association instead as the authority of global hockey since it was still active during the war. The International Ice Hockey Association was led by past CAHA president W. G. Hardy, and negotiated professional-amateur agreements with the National Hockey League (NHL) on behalf of the CAHA. Pickard named to the corresponding negotiating committee.

Pickard was elected first vice-president of the CAHA in April 1945. He was named chairman of the resolutions committee, which received recommended changes from the rules committee which the CAHA enlarged to include representation from each branch. He expected a boom in global hockey during the post-war period, and stressed the importance of grants towards building minor ice hockey as a foundation for the expected growth.

The CAHA resumed the national Allan Cup championship for senior hockey after a hiatus in 1945 due to travel costs during the war, and increased travel allowances for teams which reached the inter-provincial playoffs for the Allan Cup and the national Memorial Cup championship for junior hockey. The CAHA declared that any player from a defunct military hockey team would now be a free agent and could register to play where he resided post-war without requiring the usual transfer. Pickard remained in charge of Western Canada playoffs and clarified this ruling by stating that any player still in an active military service, remained the property of the same hockey team.

Pickard was re-elected in May 1946, when the CAHA wanted to renegotiate and improve the financial terms of its professional-amateur agreement with the NHL. The CAHA sought a $2,000 fee per player signed to a contract in the NHL, and $1,000 per player signed to a minor league contract. The CAHA rejected the initial flat rate offer of $20,000 by the NHL for any number amateur players signed as a professionals. The flat rate was later accepted with the stipulation that a junior-aged player could sign a contract at age 16, but remain in junior hockey under CAHA jurisdiction until age 18.

The Memorial Cup was the championship trophy for junior ice hockey in Canada.

During game three of the 1947 Memorial Cup played at the Queen City Gardens in Regina, Moose Jaw Canucks defender Jim Bedard was assessed a penalty which spectators protested by throwing bottles onto the ice surface. Pickard used the public address system to ask for calm, but spectators continued to litter the ice, and he subsequently forfeited the game in favour of the Toronto St. Michael's Majors. He warned that any repeat of the incident would result in the series being awarded to St. Michael's. He was later criticized by the Ontario Hockey Association (OHA) for playing the series in Western Canada, but he felt that supporters of junior hockey in Western Canada deserved a chance to see the games despite the recent practice of playing all Memorial Cup finals at Maple Leaf Gardens to bring the greatest profit.

== Canadian hockey president ==
=== First term ===
Pickard was elected president of the CAHA on May 5, 1947, to succeed Hanson Dowell. The CAHA established the permanent position of a secretary-manager for the CAHA, which was filled by George Dudley. The CAHA renegotiated its professional-amateur agreement with the NHL, which included $2,000 per player signed to the NHL and $1,000 per player signed to the minor leagues. Dudley anticipated that the new deal would exceed the existing $20,000 flat rate agreement signed in May 1946. The CAHA ratified the proposed merger of the International Ice Hockey Association into the LIHG, which became the International Ice Hockey Federation (IIHF). Pickard stated that the CAHA and AHAUS would be assured of autonomy under the agreement which governed relationships between national ice hockey organizations.

Pickard attended the IIHF congress that debated whether ice hockey at the 1948 Winter Olympics would be played according to the strict International Olympic Committee (IOC) definition of amateur, or whether the IIHF would hold its Ice Hockey World Championships separate from the Olympic Games. Canada did not participate in the 1947 Ice Hockey World Championships and the CAHA had decided not to participate in the 1948 Winter Olympics in disagreement with the definition of amateur by the IOC. Pickard felt Canada was obliged to send a Canada men's national ice hockey team truly representative of the "greatest hockey country" in the world, and honestly take the Olympic Oath as amateurs. He stated that Canada would have been misunderstood, "if we had refused to participate because we did not get our own way".

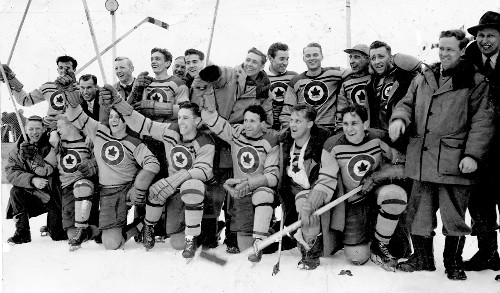
The Ottawa RCAF Flyers at the 1948 Winter Olympics.

The Canadian Olympic Association indicated it would accept any team nominated by the CAHA which met amateur eligibility. Pickard announced the Ottawa RCAF Flyers were chosen to represent the country and appeal to patriotic support for the RCAF, but still continued to press for international recognition of the CAHA's definition of amateur. He also confirmed that the CAHA would pay the national team's expenses for the Olympics, and provide support to use the best Canadian players available. The RCAF Flyers won the gold medal at the Olympics, and were given special consideration to enter the 1948 Allan Cup playoffs upon their return from Europe. Pickard later stated that the national team was highly regarded in Europe and were noted for being gentlemen both on and off the ice.

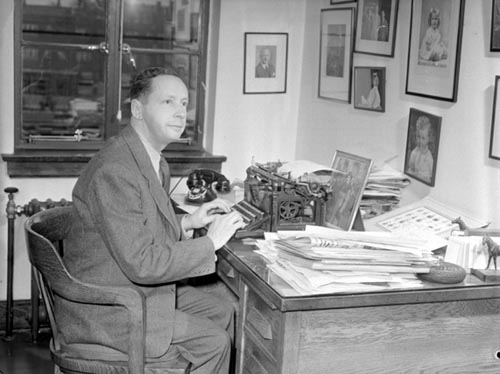
Foster Hewitt

Pickard oversaw the playoffs in Western Canada for the Allan Cup and Memorial Cup. He supported a resolution where any radio station which broadcast a team's games during the regular season would not pay a premium for the additional playoffs games, and the appointment of Foster Hewitt as the national radio commissioner. CKFI protested to Pickard regarding a $25-per-game fee imposed by Hewitt to broadcast games for the Fort Frances Canadians during the 1948 Allan Cup playoffs, and claimed that no radio station paid fees to broadcast the 1948 Memorial Cup playoffs. Pickard did not want to grant exclusive radio broadcast rights to any station, and the CAHA decided that only out-of-town radio stations would pay a broadcast fee for final games in the Allan Cup and Memorial Cup.

Pickard scheduled the seventh game of the Western Canada junior final at Maple Leaf Gardens in Toronto, where the 1948 Memorial Cup finals were also scheduled. CAHA by-laws at the time stated that a seventh game be played at a neutral site and the Winnipeg Amphitheatre was unavailable. The decision was criticized in Western Canada, and the Winnipeg Free Press charged that the CAHA was "doing anything for a profit". Pickard responded that any money collected by the CAHA was contributed to the "good of hockey in Canada", and that approximately $78,000 of its annual $100,000 intake was reinvested into future development and covered travel expenses for teams during Allan Cup and Memorial Cup play.

In the 1948 Memorial Cup final, Barrie Flyers' coach Hap Emms threatened that his team would not play the fourth game without a change of referees. Pickard declined to change the referees and the Port Arthur West End Bruins won the series in the fourth game. Pickard suspended Flyers' player Alf Guarda two years for striking referee Vic Lindquist during game four, and condemned the behaviour of Emms and the team's failure to respect on-ice officials.

=== Professionalism proposals ===
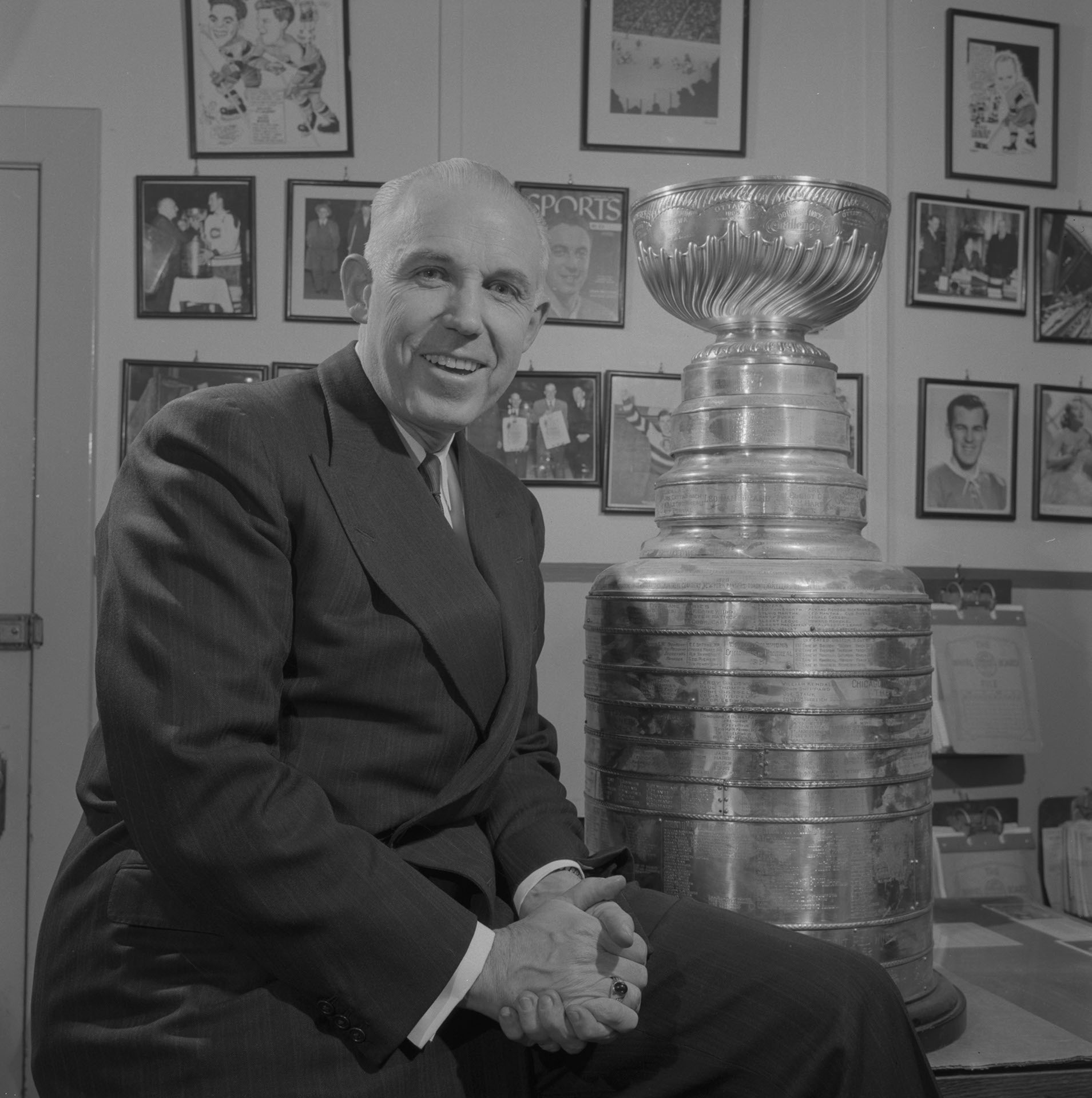
Clarence Campbell

In the weeks leading up to the 1948 general meeting, the CAHA considered two proposals to semi-professionalize player contracts in junior and senior hockey in Canada.

NHL president Clarence Campbell, suggested to create professional leagues from the top amateur leagues in Canada. He proposed that such professional leagues could have a reserve list not exceeding twenty players from an amateur senior league who were signed to a contract with a reserve clause. He also proposed that senior leagues agree to a salary limit and a player draft by professional leagues. The plan would pay $5,000 per amateur player signed by each NHL team, or $3,500 by each American Hockey League team, and eliminate the existing annual grant of $31,000 to the CAHA. The Canadian Press noted that clubs which operated under CAHA jurisdiction were exempt from the 20 per cent federal amusement tax, and that accepting the proposal might remove that benefit.

OHA president George Panter, made a separate proposal that called for a contract system for the A-level players in senior and junior hockey, where a maximum of six players could be on a professional-style contact that could be sold or traded openly. A third proposal from CAHA past-president Cecil Duncan, was to establish a major series in senior hockey for the teams which dominated Allan Cup play. CAHA life member and former Allan Cup trustee William Northey, wrote a letter to Pickard which recommended that both the Allan Cup and Memorial Cup be retired since they no longer represented amateur competition, and that the CAHA should drop the word amateur from its name.

Pickard favoured renewing the existing professional-amateur agreement signed in 1947, and stated that the proposals "would have a profound effect on the future of the CAHA if accepted". Campbell was invited by Pickard to present and discuss the NHL's contract proposals before a seven-man committee in advance of the general meeting. The committee declined to present Campbell's and Panter's proposals to the delegates for voting. Pickard stated they would be tabled for further consideration, and Campbell understood that it would not affect the existing agreement between the NHL and the CAHA which included the annual grant. The committee also rejected Northey's calls to drop the word amateur, and explained that the CAHA was built upon teams which operated as a community efforts and that profits were invested into development of minor hockey.

=== Second term ===
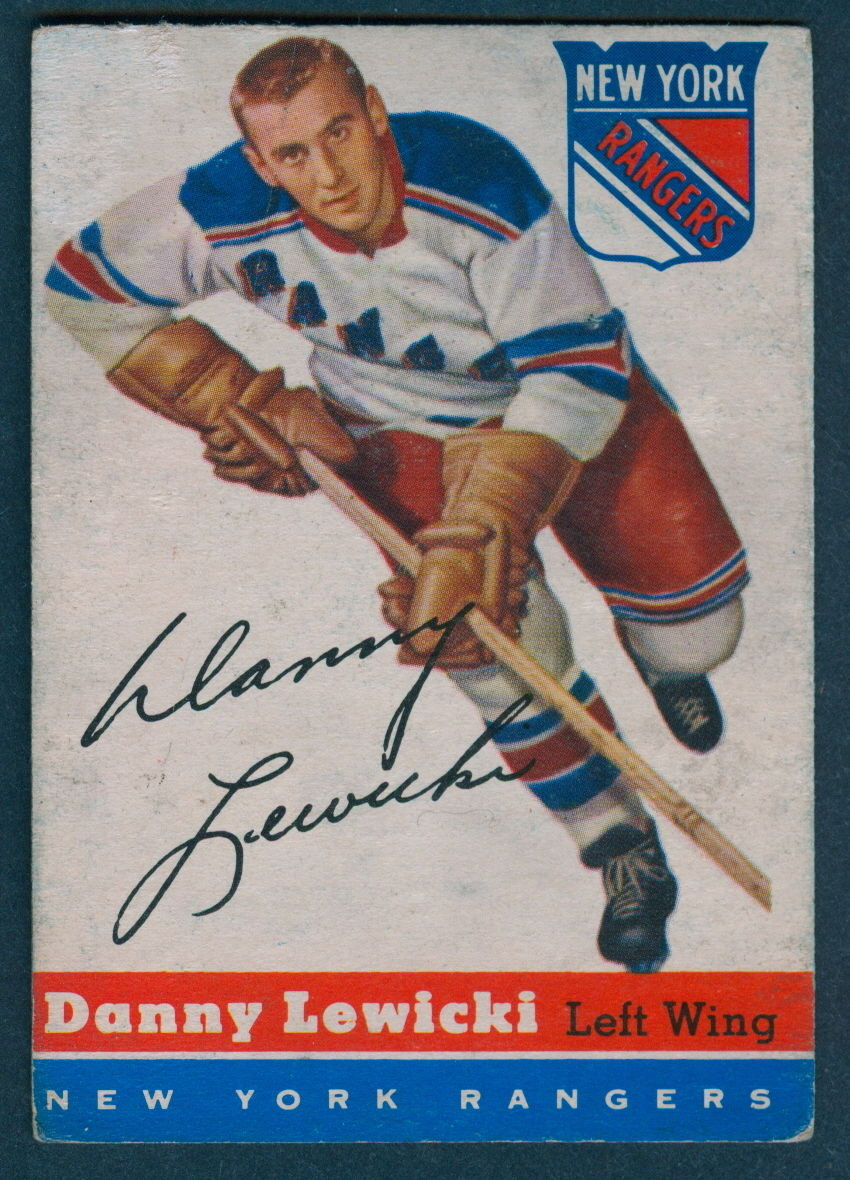
Danny Lewicki

Pickard was re-elected president in April 1948, despite speculation from the Canadian Press that he would be replaced. The CAHA had no first vice-president at the time since Norman Dawe died unexpectedly in January 1948. No replacement had been named for Dawe, and Western Canada delegates reportedly sought to have OHA president George Panter elected.

Pickard attended the IIHF congress in Zürich in July 1948, and sought for the adoption of the CAHA definition of amateur in an effort to ice an international team truly representative of Canada. W. G. Hardy was elected president of the IIHF, and Pickard felt that Hardy had represented Canada well and "did a superb job of cementing hockey relations in Europe".

The new OHA president, J. J. McFadyen, criticized the modern ice hockey rules and felt they were made to suit the American spectator and had been dictated by the NHL. Pickard wanted to see the rules more strictly enforced for player safety, but denied that rules were tailored to professional play in the United States and stated that the rules were made by mutual decision between the CAHA and the NHL.

Toronto Maple Leafs team owner Conn Smythe threatened to have Danny Lewicki suspended from junior hockey, if he refused to report according to having signed a C-form at age 16. The form gave bonus money to a prospect played under age 18, in return for a future professional commitment and offer of a contract. Despite players signing the form and being aware of its contents, it was criticized as slavery by players, coaches, parents, and media in Canada since it was introduced in 1947. The CAHA was compelled to support the form according to the professional-amateur agreement. Lewicki refused to play for the Toronto Marlboros junior team, and wanted to play in smaller towns and return to the Stratford Kroehlers. Pickard supported the Maples Leafs in the dispute, but would not suspend Lewicki from junior hockey since the player was only aged 17 at the time and had not yet signed or been offered the professional contract.

=== Third term ===
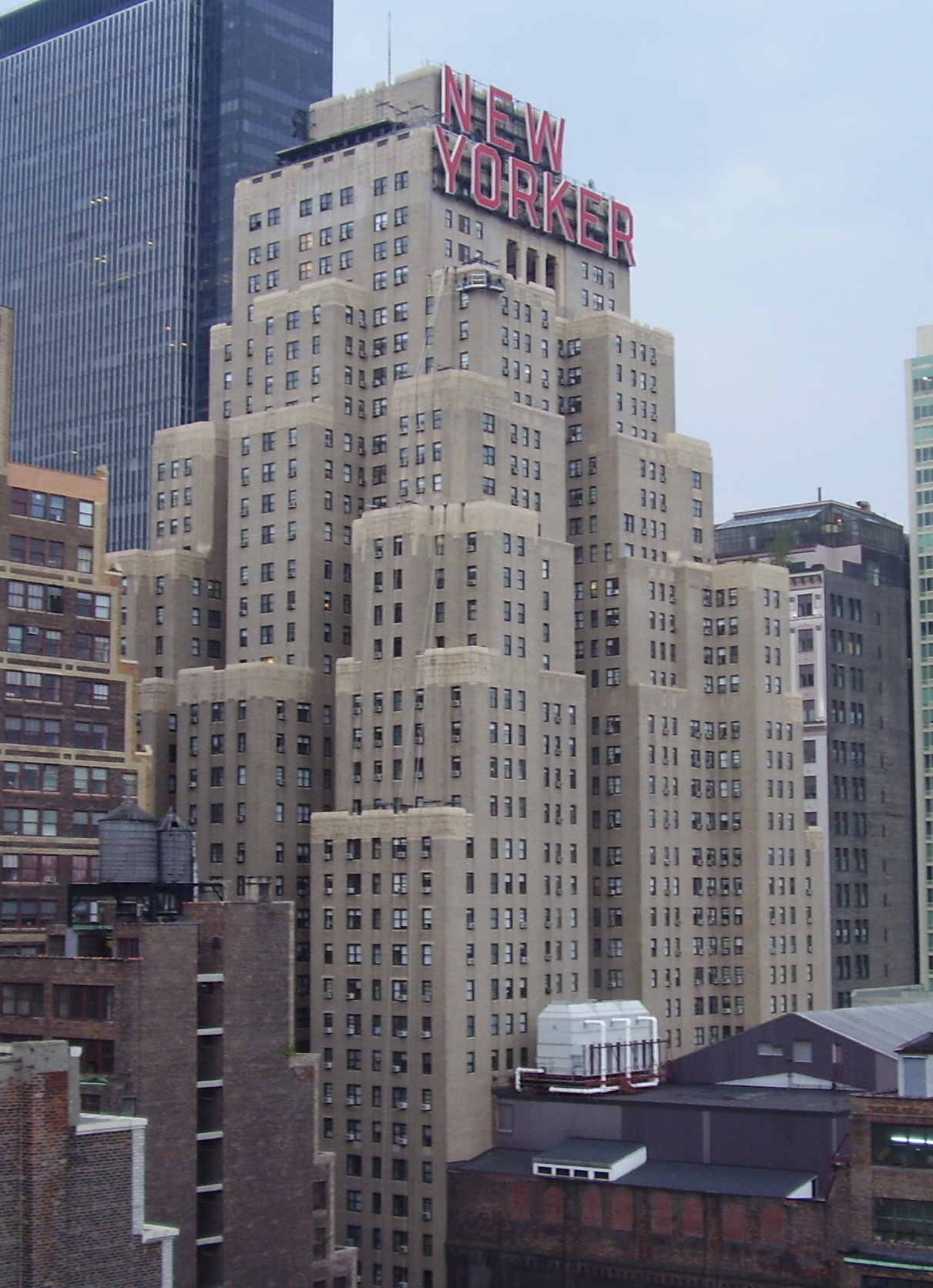
The New Yorker Hotel

The CAHA held its first general meeting outside of Canada when it joined AHAUS and the IIHF concurrently at the New Yorker Hotel in May 1949. The joint meetings were arranged by AHAUS president Tommy Lockhart, who felt that it demonstrated international ice hockey co-operation. The event was also the first time that the CAHA and AHAUS held a joint annual meeting.

North American professional and amateur leagues agreed on a campaign to sell hockey to Canadians and Americans. A committee composed of Pickard, Hardy and Campbell, was made to "plan and develop a positive statement of hockey objectives for a vigorous presentation to the public". The campaign was in response to alleged exploitation of young hockey players by professional teams, and wanted to stress hockey as a career and an honorable profession. Pickard sought to maintain the existing regulations which limited player movement across Canada to suit the amateur needs. Motions at the general meeting to increase the number of inter-branch transfers were all defeated.

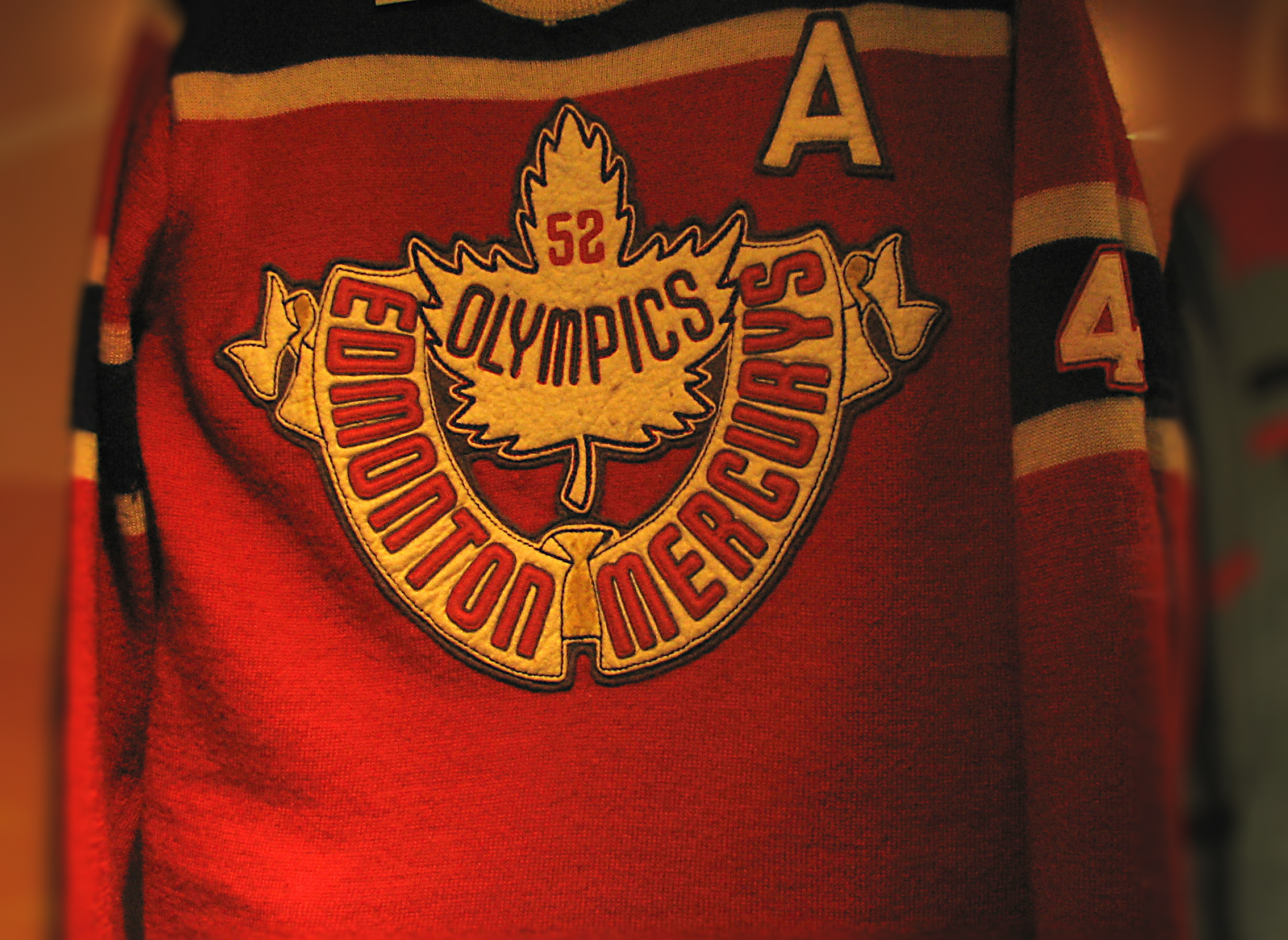
Edmonton Mercurys jersey

In August 1949, Pickard announced that the Edmonton Mercurys would represent Canada at the 1950 Ice Hockey World Championships in England. He conceded that Edmonton was not the strongest choice since it played at the intermediate level of senior hockey, but amateur requirements made it difficult to send a top flight team to the Ice Hockey World Championships. The CAHA scheduled a three-month European tour for the team and committed to finding the best available players as reinforcements. Edmonton regained the World Championships title for Canada without losing a game, and avoided further disappointment after the second-place finish at the 1949 Ice Hockey World Championships.

In advance of the 1950 CAHA semiannual meeting, Pickard spoke out against the dump and chase style of hockey which led to skirmishes in the corners of the ice rink. He felt it was not interesting to spectators and noted that players were being injured along the sideboards. He believed that changes would eventually be made, despite difficulties in agreeing on rule changes to prevent the issue but not cause other problems. At the meeting, delegates from Ontario and Quebec wanted to eliminate the "east-west line" between the Thunder Bay Amateur Hockey Association and the Ontario Hockey Association, over which no player transfers were allowed after a September 1 deadline. Western Canada supported the line to maintain its talent and prevent imbalance. Pickard refused to accept the motion and deferred it until a proper notice of motion was submitted to update the constitution.

The CAHA faced issues with the professional-style operation of its top-level senior teams during the 1950 Allan Cup playoffs. Conn Smythe threatened that the Toronto Marlboros senior team would not continue the playoffs unless the CAHA guaranteed the team against financial losses for travel to the finals in Calgary, and claimed that it cost $2,000 per week to keep the team operational. Although the CAHA offered to pay tourist-class train tickets, the Marlboros insisted they travelled only by first-class accommodations. The London Free Press sports editor Jack Park, wrote that Smythe did not appreciate the prestige of winning the Allan Cup, and that the CAHA was essentially sponsoring teams by covering travel expenses. Park speculated that amateur hockey might be fading away, and that teams in larger cities would rather operate openly as professional to have more control over player salaries due to the competition for talent.

The CAHA's general meeting in 1950 was held in Banff, Alberta. Pickard did not seek a fourth term as president and expected to return to senior hockey in Saskatchewan.

== Later Saskatchewan hockey career ==
The Allan Cup was the championship trophy for amateur senior ice hockey in Canada.

Pickard was succeeded as president by Doug Grimston on June 10, 1950. As the past-president, Pickard continued to assist in negotiations between the CAHA and professional leagues until 1954.

Pickard was elected president of the Western Canada Senior Hockey League (WCSHL) in September 1950, and succeeded D. P. McDonald who had been league's only president since 1945. The WCSHL became part of the Major Series for senior hockey which was a new Canadian playoffs structure at a higher calibre of competition than the Allan Cup. The WCSHL was reduced to four members after the season concluded, and the remaining teams chose to become professional and merge into the Pacific Coast Hockey League for the 1951–52 season.

With the end of the WCSHL, Pickard returned to overseeing the Saskatchewan Senior Hockey League, and served as president of the league for the 1951–52 and 1952–53 seasons. He also became governor of the Western Canada Junior Hockey League in September 1951 to succeed Red Dutton, and welcomed the Edmonton Oil Kings as a new entry to the league. After two seasons as the league's governor, he was succeeded by Ken Doraty in July 1953. Pickard also served as a governor of the Saskatchewan Junior Hockey League for the 1952–53 and 1953–54 seasons.

The Quebec Amateur Hockey Association was suspended by the CAHA in February 1953 for not following proper transfer and registration procedures for Ron Attwell. Pickard was asked by the QAHA to be an intermediary with the CAHA for its successful application for reinstatement in May 1953.

Pickard was in charge of senior and junior Western Canada playoffs in 1954, and was chosen to present the 1955 Memorial Cup which was played in Regina. The CAHA held its general meeting in Regina in May 1955, which marked the first time that the SAHA had hosted the event. Pickard was named a co-manager for the general meeting, along with SAHA president Ken Mayhew.

== Later life and return to Exeter ==
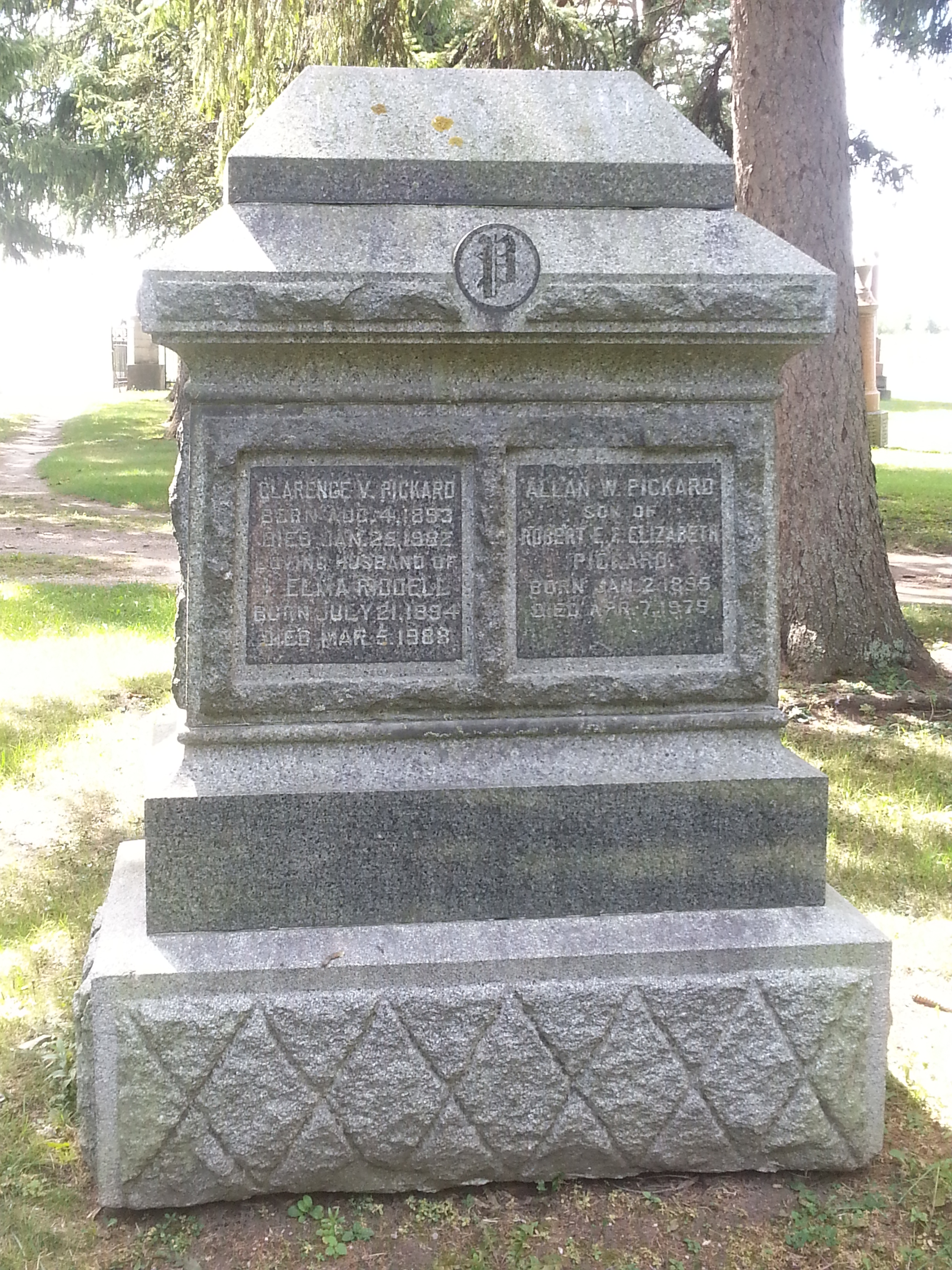
Pickard family monument in Exeter Public Cemetery

Pickard was named a member of the Hockey Hall of Fame inductee selection committee in April 1958, and remained on the committee until June 1964.

Pickard retired in 1960, after working 36 years for the Regina Public School Board. He served as a principal for 30 years, and worked at six schools which included Benson, Strathcona, Davin, Kitchener, Connaught and Herchmer. His hobbies included fishing and golfing. He was a member of the Wascana Golf and Country Club in Regina and served one term as its president. He returned to Ontario in June 1960.

Pickard soon became involved in civic duties in Exeter and served as the chairman of town's first planning committee. He oversaw the preparation of zoning by-laws and a development strategy, approved by the Government of Ontario in 1965. He later represented Exeter on the Ausable Bayfield Conservation Authority.

Pickard died at the South Huron Hospital in Exeter on April 7, 1975. He never married and was interred in family plot in Exeter Public Cemetery.

== Honours and awards ==
Pickard received the AHAUS citation award in 1950, for contributions to the game in the United States. The SAHA made him the namesake of the Al Pickard Trophy in 1951, to be awarded the championship team of the C-division in the juvenile age group. He received the Ontario Hockey Association Gold Stick Award in 1953, for service to the game in Canada. He was made a life member of both the SAHA and CAHA, was an honorary president of the Manitoba Amateur Hockey Association, and was inducted into the builder category of the Hockey Hall of Fame on April 27, 1958.

In 1967, Regina honoured Pickard with a plaque for his contributions to the city. The local board of education opened Al Pickard School the same year, and with the roadway in front of school was renamed Pickard Street. He was inducted into the builder category of the Saskatchewan Sports Hall of Fame in 1967, and was posthumously inducted into the builder category of the Regina Sports Hall of Fame on October 7, 2004.
