= Sydney Halter =

Canadian sports executive (1905–1990)

Profile
- Position: Commissioner of the CFL

Personal information
- Born: April 18, 1905; Winnipeg, Manitoba, Canada
- Died: October 24, 1990 (aged 85); Winnipeg, Manitoba, Canada

Career information
- College: University of Manitoba

Career history
- 1958–1966: CFL
- Canadian Football Hall of Fame (Class of 1966)

Gerald Sydney Halter, OC (April 18, 1905 – October 24, 1990) was a Canadian sports executive and lawyer. He served as the first commissioner of the Canadian Football League from 1958 to 1966, and was president of the Amateur Athletic Union of Canada from 1938 to 1946.

== Biography ==
Born in Winnipeg, Manitoba, he received a Bachelor of Arts degree in 1924 and a Bachelor of Law degree in 1927 from the University of Manitoba. He helped organize the Winnipeg Football Club, now the Winnipeg Blue Bombers, in 1934. He was president of the Amateur Athletic Union of Canada from 1938 to 1946, succeeding Jack Hamilton.

In 1956, Halter became commissioner of the Canadian Football Council (CFC), an umbrella organization of the two most powerful Canadian football unions, the eastern Interprovincial Rugby Football Union and the Western Interprovincial Football Union. The CFC withdrew from the Canadian Rugby Union in 1958 and formed its own league, the Canadian Football League (CFL). Halter became the CFL's first commissioner, a post he held until 1966. From 1966 to 1971, he was vice-chairman of the Manitoba Horse Racing Commission, and was chairman from 1972 to 1982.

== Honours ==
In 1977, he was made an Officer of the Order of Canada. In 1963, he was inducted into the Canadian Olympic Hall of Fame. In 1966, he was inducted into the Canadian Football Hall of Fame. In 1975, he was inducted into Canada's Sports Hall of Fame. In 1982, he was inducted into the Manitoba Sports Hall of Fame. In 1988, he was inducted into the Canadian Horse Racing Hall of Fame. In 2006, he was inducted into the International Jewish Sports Hall of Fame.
