= Jack Hamilton (sports executive) =

Canadian sports executive (1886–1976)

- Born: John Welch Hamilton; June 11, 1886; Caledonia, Ontario, Canada
- Died: August 5, 1976 (aged 90); Regina, Saskatchewan, Canada
- Occupations: Lumber company manager, school teacher, politician
- Known for: Canadian Amateur Hockey Association; Amateur Athletic Union of Canada; Canadian Olympic Committee; Saskatchewan Amateur Hockey Association
- Awards: Canada's Sports Hall of Fame, Canadian Olympic Hall of Fame, King George VI Coronation Medal

John Welch Hamilton (June 11, 1886 – August 5, 1976) was a Canadian sports executive. He served as president of the Canadian Amateur Hockey Association (CAHA) from 1930 to 1932, and as president of the Amateur Athletic Union of Canada (AAU of C) from 1936 to 1938. He was also a member of the Canadian Olympic Committee for 17 years. His leadership of the CAHA and the AAU of C coincided with efforts to maintain amateurism and combat growing professionalism in sport. He appointed a committee to establish better relations between the CAHA and professional leagues, and praised the players and teams for quality hockey and growth of the amateur game in Canada despite the competition. He favoured professionals in one sport playing as amateurs in another, and took charge of the AAU of C at a time when the CAHA, the Canadian Amateur Basketball Association, and the Canadian Amateur Lacrosse Association challenged the definition of amateur, and later broke away from the AAU of C which wanted to hold onto purist ideals of amateurism.

Hamilton served two years as president of the Saskatchewan Amateur Hockey Association, and had multiple terms as president of the Southern Saskatchewan Hockey League. He operated the Queen City Gardens for 11 years, and helped organized the construction of ice hockey rinks in Saskatoon, Regina and Moose Jaw. He was the secretary and treasurer of the Regina Roughriders from 1922 to 1938, sat on the rules committee for the Canadian Rugby Union, and served as president of both the Saskatchewan Amateur Rugby Union and the Western Interprovincial Football Union. His career in sports was recognized with the King George VI Coronation Medal in 1937, and induction into the Saskatchewan Sports Hall of Fame, the Canadian Olympic Hall of Fame, and Canada's Sports Hall of Fame.

== Early life and early sports involvement ==
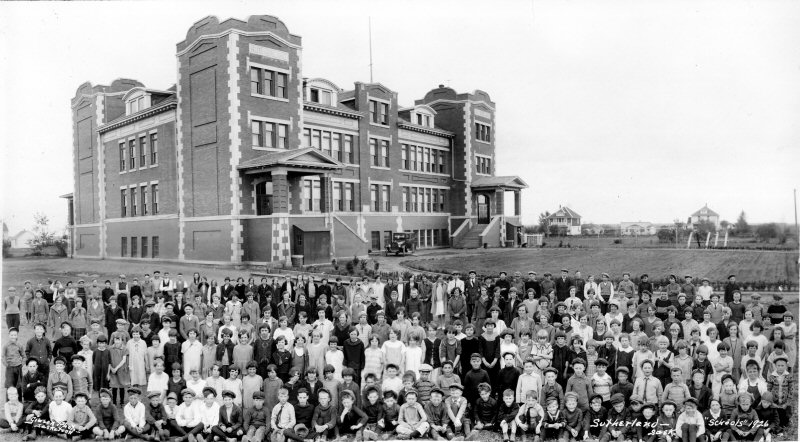
Sutherland School

John Welch Hamilton was born June 11, 1886, in the hamlet of Sim's Locks, near Caledonia, Ontario. He was the oldest child of three boys and one girl, to parents Robert Hamilton and Janet Shields Welch. Hamilton became a school teacher in Ontario, then moved to Sutherland, Saskatchewan in 1909, and taught at Sutherland School.

Hamilton was involved with the Sutherland Baseball Club as its secretary and treasurer from 1912 to 1916. He married Catherine Edith McDonald on September 8, 1915, and they later had two sons. He became mayor of Sutherland in 1916. He organized construction of an enclosed curling rink and an outdoor ice hockey rink for the town. Hamilton and four partners organized construction of an arena with seating for 3,500 spectators in Saskatoon in 1918.

Hamilton moved to Regina, Saskatchewan in 1921, and worked at Security Lumber Company. He later became general manager of the lumber yard in Regina. In a guessing competition at a lumber convention, he correctly identified 136 different samples of wood to become Canadian champion in 1930.

The Saskatchewan branch of the Amateur Athletic Union of Canada (AAU of C) chose Hamilton as its president in 1921. He remained in the role for 15 years, and also served on the national registration committee. The AAU of C named Hamilton as a delegate to the Canadian Olympic Committee in preparation for the 1928 Summer Olympics.

Hamilton served as the secretary and treasurer of the Regina Roughriders from 1922 to 1938, and was president of the Saskatchewan Amateur Rugby Union. He was president of the Western Interprovincial Football Union for the 1928 season.

== Saskatchewan Amateur Hockey Association ==
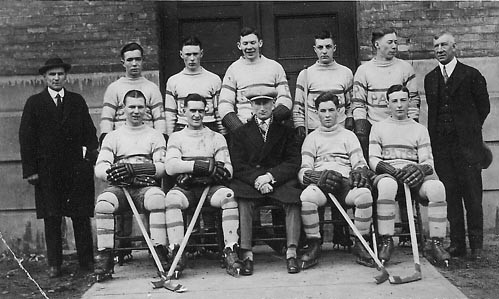
1924–25 Regina Pats

In senior ice hockey, Hamilton was the coach and manager of the Regina Victorias from 1924 to 1927. He became vice-president of Saskatchewan Amateur Hockey Association (SAHA) in 1924, then served as its president from 1925 to 1927. As league president he succeeded in reversing its financial troubles. While SAHA president, he served as a governor of the original Saskatchewan junior ice hockey league, and sat on the registration and resolution committees for the Canadian Amateur Hockey Association (CAHA).

In the wake of the Regina Capitals leaving for Portland, Oregon in 1925, a group of Regina businessmen proposed to finance a professional hockey team for the city if the public supported it. Hamilton successfully garnered support instead for amateur hockey at a public meeting, by promoting the junior hockey quality of the Regina Pats who won the 1925 Memorial Cup and the progress of the Regina Victorias in the Allan Cup playoffs.

Hamilton served as president of the Southern Saskatchewan Hockey League during the 1925–26 season. When the Brandon Wheat City Hockey Club applied to be members of the league, Hamilton stated that first priority should be given to teams in Saskatchewan and was against the request. He arranged for an executive meeting to deal with the application, and later admitted the Brandon team when eight of nine executive members voted in favour. Hamilton later awarded the league championship to the Regina Victorias when he ruled that Brandon had used two ineligible players in the playoffs.

== Canadian Amateur Hockey Association ==
=== Vice-president ===
The Allan Cup was the championship trophy for amateur senior ice hockey in Canada.

Hamilton was elected vice-president of the CAHA in March 1928, at the same meeting when control of the Allan Cup was formally handed over from its trustees to the CAHA. He was re-elected vice-president in March 1929, and was named to the finance committee which controlled all CAHA funds except for Allan Cup proceeds. He was placed in charge of junior and senior playoffs for Western Canada, and stated the lack of artificial ice surfaces in Alberta and Saskatchewan as a reason for playing the finals in Winnipeg.

=== President, first term ===
Hamilton was elected president of the CAHA on March 29, 1930, to succeed W. A. Fry. Hamilton's time as president began during a period of growth in junior hockey which saw CAHA registration increase to 13,675 players. He submitted a motion in which the CAHA would accept registrations from any former professional players reinstated as amateurs by the AAU of C, although those players would not be eligible for the Olympic Games. He also appointed a committee to establish better relations between the CAHA and professional leagues.

The CAHA was faced with the new situation of players returning from professional tryouts without signing a contract. The AAU of C had a policy that such players would be classified as professional and ineligible for amateur play. Since the policy had not been enforced before, Hamilton stated that the CAHA would cancel those players' cards without penalty to the team. He later arranged to have a mail-in vote for the CAHA to decide whether or not players who tried out for professional teams but who were not signed to a contract could be reinstated.

At the 1931 general meeting, Hamilton praised the players who chose to remain as amateurs despite the lure of professional teams, and the resulting of increase of registrations. He also praised the organizations which continued to produce quality hockey for the Canadian public despite inroads by professional teams, and felt that the security of the CAHA rested "upon the ideals and practices of honest and honorable men". The CAHA decided not to reinstate amateur status to players who tried out with professional teams. It also disallowed any of its teams to play exhibition games against professional teams, and let the AAU of C decide whether professionals in one sport could be amateurs in hockey. The CAHA also approved the naming of the host location for Allan Cup and Memorial Cup finals a year in advance, as opposed to the executive deciding a month in advance.

=== President, second term ===
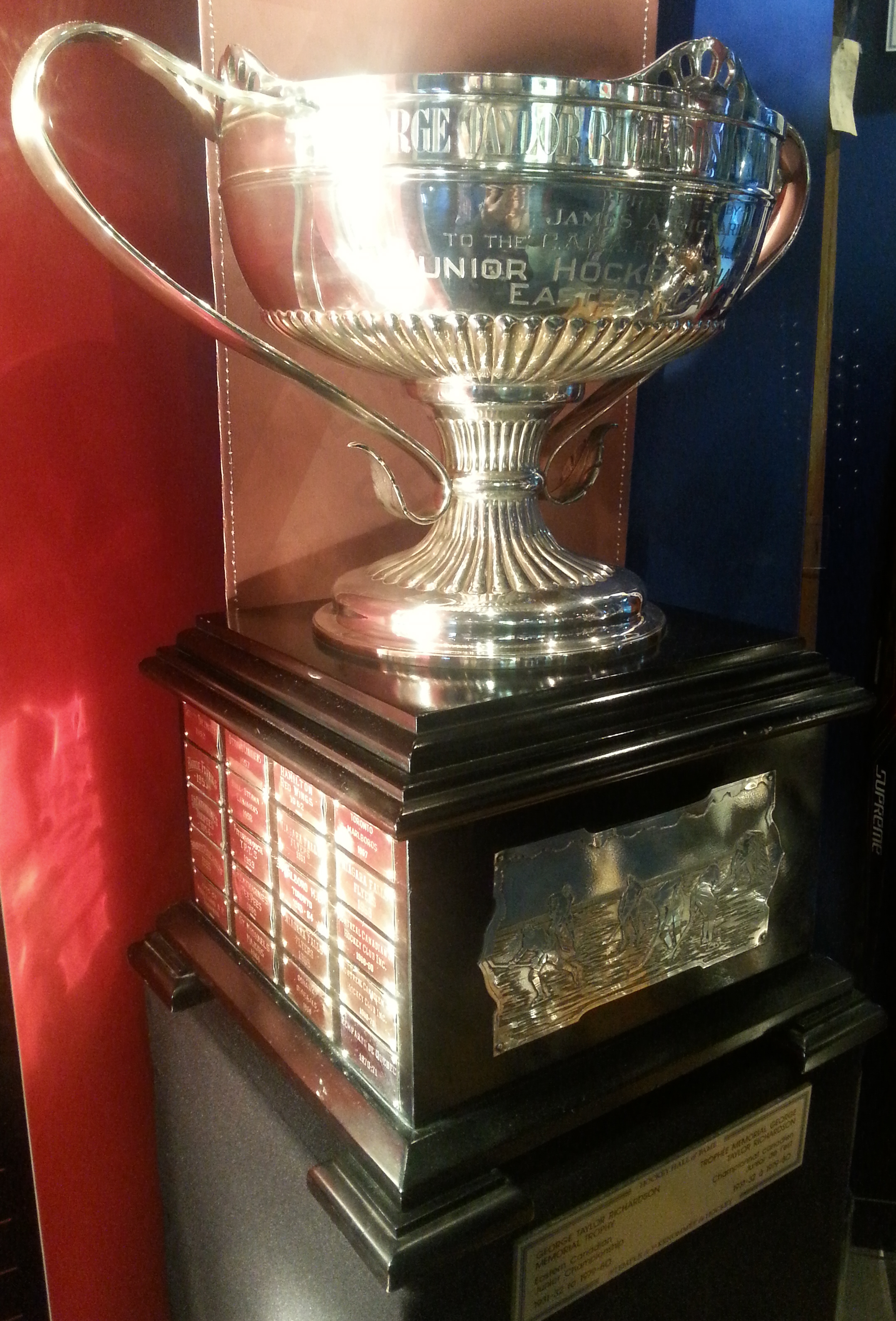
The CAHA approved the establishment of the George Richardson Memorial Trophy in 1932, for the Eastern Canada junior champion.

Hamilton was re-elected president of the CAHA on April 3, 1931. Teams soon began to speak out against the increased turnover of players due to raids by other teams. Hamilton issued a warning to all players that inter-branch transfers requested before the May 15 deadline, would be investigated to ensure a valid reason for moving between provinces of Canada and eliminate the "hockey tourist" travelling about the country in search of a better team. In advance of the August 15 deadline to register with one's own branch, Hamilton issued another warning and stated that investigations would continue and that a national meeting might be called to resolve the issue. The decision was a change from the previous year's deadline when the CAHA had approved all transfers submitted without investigation due to the Great Depression and the need to relocate for employment.

In October 1931, the CAHA executive changed the deadline to a reside in a branch from May 15 to January 1, in an effort to stop the "hockey tourist", and investigate bona fide transfers for employment. The change effectively meant that a player had to sit out for a season before he could transfer between branches. The Manitoba Amateur Hockey Association refused to approved transfers for eight of its players to Montreal and Moncton without a sworn affidavit by each player for the reason of the transfer. In an effort to combat increasing professionalism, Hamilton announced that the CAHA would not reinstate players as amateurs who had tried out for professional teams, despite a ruling from the AAU of C which since allowed for reinstatement.

Hamilton responded to charges of professionalism in leagues in the Maritimes by saying that a hearing would be conducted if an official complaint was received. In an effort to ensure amateurism, he announced that players taking part in provincial finals for the 1932 Allan Cup and 1932 Memorial Cup playoffs would be required to recite an oath similar to the Olympic Oath, and declare they meet all amateur requirements. Any violation of the oath would render the player's team ineligible for the remainder of the playoffs.

At the general meeting in 1932, the CAHA considered implementing the forward pass in the amateur game, as used in the professional game to reduce the frequency of offside infractions. In an effort to educate, Hamilton circulated diagrams of hockey plays where the rules were regularly misinterpreted such as offside. Registration with the CAHA had increased in five consecutive seasons despite competition from professional teams. Hamilton declared the playoffs were financially successful, and felt that the CAHA had the confidence of the Canadian public for tending to the "moral and physical uplift of our athletes". He was succeeded as CAHA president by Frank Greenleaf from Montreal.

== Sports involvement in the 1930s ==
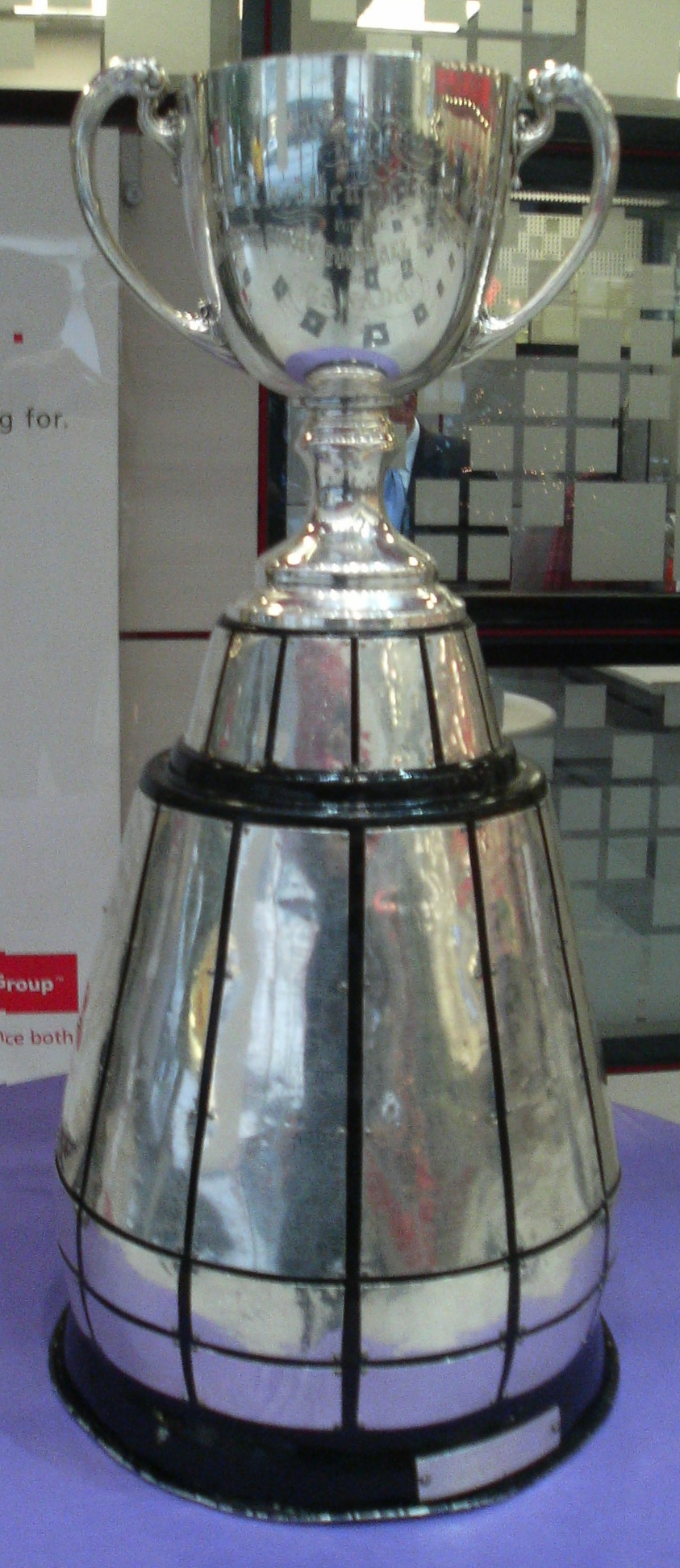
The Regina Roughriders appeared in seven Grey Cup championships while Hamilton was the team's secretary and treasurer.

Hamilton continued to serve as president of the Saskatchewan branch of the AAU of C until 1936, and was named chairman of the AAU of C registration committee in 1930. He was named to the AAU of C executive by its new president, J. Howard Crocker in 1932, and named to the committee for redistricting AAU of C branches in 1933. In 1930, Hamilton stated efforts would be made to establish a provincial baseball association. He later served as president of the Saskatchewan Amateur Baseball Association from 1933 to 1934.

Hamilton favoured professionals in one sport playing as amateurs in another, as it would grow amateur baseball in Saskatchewan by allowing hockey professionals to players an amateur summer sport. At the AAU of C general meeting in 1930, Hamilton unsuccessfully sought for the approval of professionals having a secondary amateur sport. He also advocated for the reinstatement of soccer players who had unknowingly played against a professional hockey player in a soccer match. Two years later, Hamilton tried again to no avail. At the general meeting for the AAU of C in 1933, Hamilton tried a third time to allow professionals in one sport to compete as an amateur in another sport. He received strong support from Western Canada, but the motion was defeated by opposition from Eastern Canada.

Hamilton served as a member of the Canadian Olympic Committee for 17 years from 1931 to 1948. He was part of the delegation that lobbied Edgar Nelson Rhodes, the Canadian Minister of Finance, for funds to cover travel expenses for athletes to the 1932 Summer Olympics in Los Angeles.

Hamilton continued to serve as the secretary and treasurer of the Regina Roughriders until 1938. He represented the Roughriders at meetings of the Saskatchewan Rugby Football Union, and represented the province at the Western Interprovincial Football Union. He also sat on the rules committee for the Western Canada Rugby Football Union, and the Canadian Rugby Union.

Hamilton was placed in charge of the Western Canada junior playoffs for 1933. He also acted as a convenor for junior hockey in Regina. When the Regina Maple Leafs ceased playing in December 1933, the SAHA was concerned about a mass transfer of players to the Regina Pats and a talent imbalance in the league. Hamilton proposed that since the Maple Leafs folded, none of their players should displace players already on the Regina Pats, but should be allowed to join a senior team with open places. He also felt that the players who were the "disturbing elements" not be allowed back into junior hockey.

=== Return to senior ice hockey ===
Hamilton served as president of the Southern Saskatchewan Hockey League during the 1930–31 senior ice hockey season. He was appointed to return as president on January 4, 1936, while the season was already in progress. In preparation for the playoffs to begin, Hamilton ruled that the Yorkton team had not completed its regular season and fined the team. Yorkton and teams from Moose Jaw and Weyburn, protested the use of an ineligible player by the Regina Victorias in several games, and how the points were allocated from those games in protest which affected the final league standings. Yorkton subsequently did not appear at a scheduled playoff game versus Weyburn, and considered legal action against Hamilton to prevent the league playoffs from proceeding.

Journalist Ralph Allen reported that during the series of disagreements, Hamilton was sarcastically asked if there were anymore protests. Hamilton replied, "There just isn't anything left for them to squawk about unless it's the colour of my necktie". Hamilton then reportedly received a long-distance phone call complaint from Weyburn immediately after the comment. After ten hours of discussion at an emergency meeting, Hamilton's original decision was endorsed. Weyburn and Yorkton were ordered to play a shortened playoff series, with Yorkton paying travel costs to Weyburn. Hamilton remained as league president for the 1936–37 season.

== Amateur Athletic Union of Canada president ==
Hamilton was elected president of the AAU of C on November 21, 1936, to succeed W. A. Fry. He took charge of the AAU of C at a time when multiple sports organizations challenged the definition of amateur, but it rejected proposals to relax any of its rules with respect to growing professionalism in sport. The Winnipeg Free Press noted that the "old guard" of the AAU of C was trying to hold onto the ideals of pure amateurism, despite threats by the CAHA, Canadian Amateur Basketball Association, and Canadian Amateur Lacrosse Association to break away and be their own governing bodies.

On December 15, 1936, CAHA president Cecil Duncan formally notified Hamilton in writing to terminate its articles of alliance effective January 15, 1937. Duncan noted the lack of support for CAHA proposals and that the AAU of C did not enforce CAHA suspensions. Hamilton was sympathetic with the CAHA's issues and had regrets with the choice. He felt the best actions had not been taken, and that the CAHA and the AAU of C would both suffer. He stated there should be no quarrels between the CAHA and AAU of C, and felt that there was room for ice hockey to be governed by both groups in a "friendly rivalry".

In January 1937, politician Hugh Plaxton, who had won a gold medal for Canada in ice hockey at the 1928 Winter Olympics, introduced a resolution in the House of Commons of Canada to propose the establishment of a Canadian ministry of sports. He stated it had potential to take over administration of sports and eliminate "disputes over authority and jurisdiction". Hamilton felt that the ministry might be beneficial, and that sport could be promoted with the help of department of health and reach more areas of Canada. He wanted more discussion on what would happen to sports organizations if the government took control or organized sports, but stated that the AAU of C would co-operate.

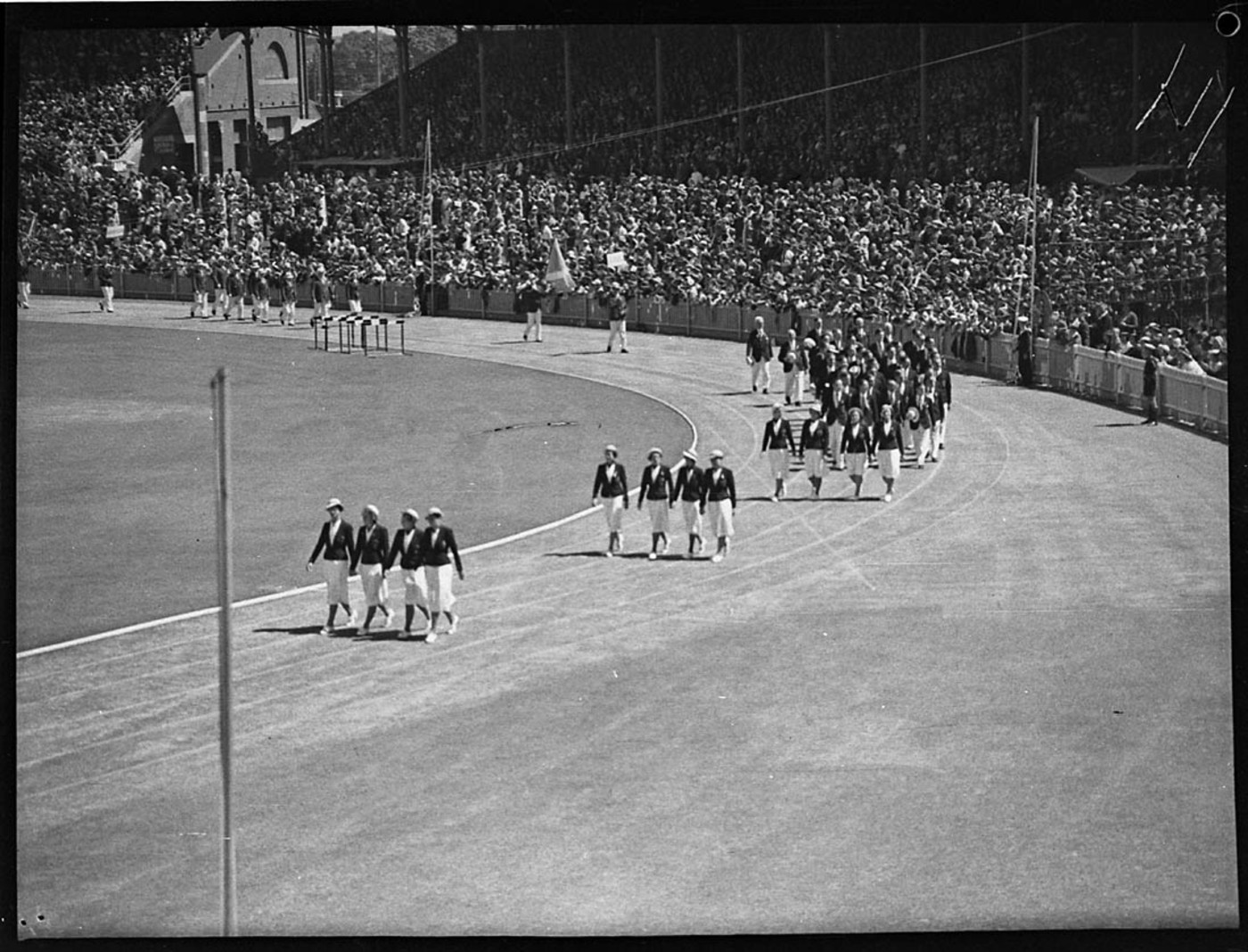
Opening ceremony of the 1938 British Empire Games at the Sydney Cricket Ground

Hamilton appointed a committee to oversee preparations for the 1938 British Empire Games, and named Edward Wentworth Beatty its chairman. The AAU of C chose not to have national track and field championships to select the team, due to the cost of sending a team to Australia. Athletes were instead chosen by trials in several zones in Canada. Hamilton appointed convenors to look after each zone.

By October 1937, both the Canadian Amateur Basketball Association and the Canadian Amateur Lacrosse Association had severed ties with the AAU of C, and adopted new definitions of an amateur. Hamilton stated there were three groups of thought within the AAU of C with respect to hockey. One group wanted continued negotiation with the CAHA. A second group felt that the AAU of C should organize hockey under its jurisdiction. A third group felt that the uprising was temporary and the CAHA would return to the fold. Hamilton felt there were two prevailing opinions with respect to basketball; to organize basketball under the AAU of C; or wait for a change of leadership in basketball that would bring it back.

In advance of the general meeting in November 1937, Hamilton urged delegates to give "special consideration" to the loss of its three biggest sporting associations and the resulting financial problems. The Winnipeg Tribune reported that the hockey, basketball and lacrosse associations had brought in more money than all of the other AAU of C affiliates combined, and that the AAU of C needed to make the first move at reconciliation. At the time, the AAU of C still had direct control of track and field, boxing and wrestling, and had alliances with the YMCA, the Women's Amateur Athletic Federation of Canada and the Canadian Amateur Rowing Association.

Hamilton declared that the hockey, basketball and lacrosse associations broke away due to personal disagreements between delegates to meetings, rather than disputes over amateurism. He stated, "Really, there never were any great differences of opinion between the AAU and the CAHA", and implied the same with basketball. He felt the greatest effect would be the loss registration revenue, and called for redistribution of branches to consolidate assets due to reduced membership. The AAU of C considered a motion to organize hockey and basketball itself, which Hamilton stated it was not an attempt to "step on the toes" of the CAHA or the Canadian Amateur Basketball Association.

Hamilton was re-elected AAU of C president in November 1937. He urged delegates to revise the AAU of C constitution to meet modern thought on amateurism, and that the future of the AAU of C depended on the outcome of the 1938 general meeting. He called for the two opposing schools of thought to come together and compromise, as failing finances were a reality. In November 1938, Sydney Halter was elected president to succeed Hamilton, and the AAU of C approved a constitutional amendment in which it would recognize the definition of amateur as given by the world governing bodies of the respective sports.

== Later career and personal life ==
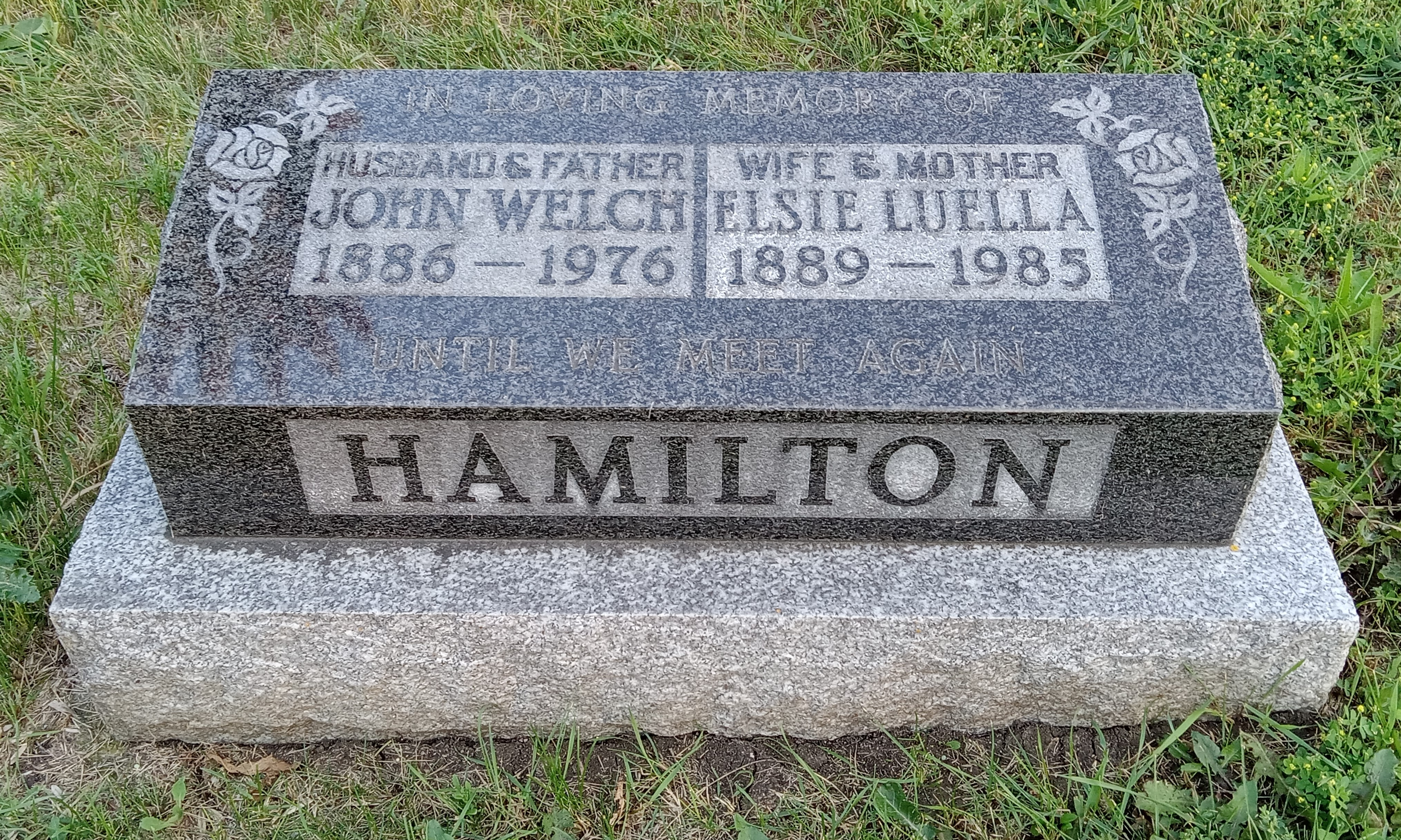
Hamilton's grave marker

Hamilton served as president of the Regina Rink Company which raised funds to install an artificial ice maker in the Regina Stadium. He operated the rink for 11 years from 1938 to 1949, when it was known as the Queen City Gardens.

Hamilton attended the silver jubilee of the CAHA hosted at the Royal Alexandra Hotel in Winnipeg on April 10, 1939, when eleven of thirteen past presidents of the CAHA were there as guests of honour.

Hamilton was elected president of the Saskatchewan Junior Hockey League in October 1946. He oversaw six teams during the season, and split them into two divisions of north and south to reduce travelling.

Hamilton's wife Catherine died on November 15, 1951. He was remarried to Elsie White Greason in December 1952, a widow who had one son.

Hamilton assisted in the planning and construction of a third arena, the Moose Jaw Civic Centre from 1957 to 1959.

Hamilton was president of the Saskatchewan Senior Hockey League during the 1959–60 season.

Hamilton died on August 5, 1976, in Regina. He was interred at Riverside Memorial Park Cemetery in Regina.

== Honours and legacy ==
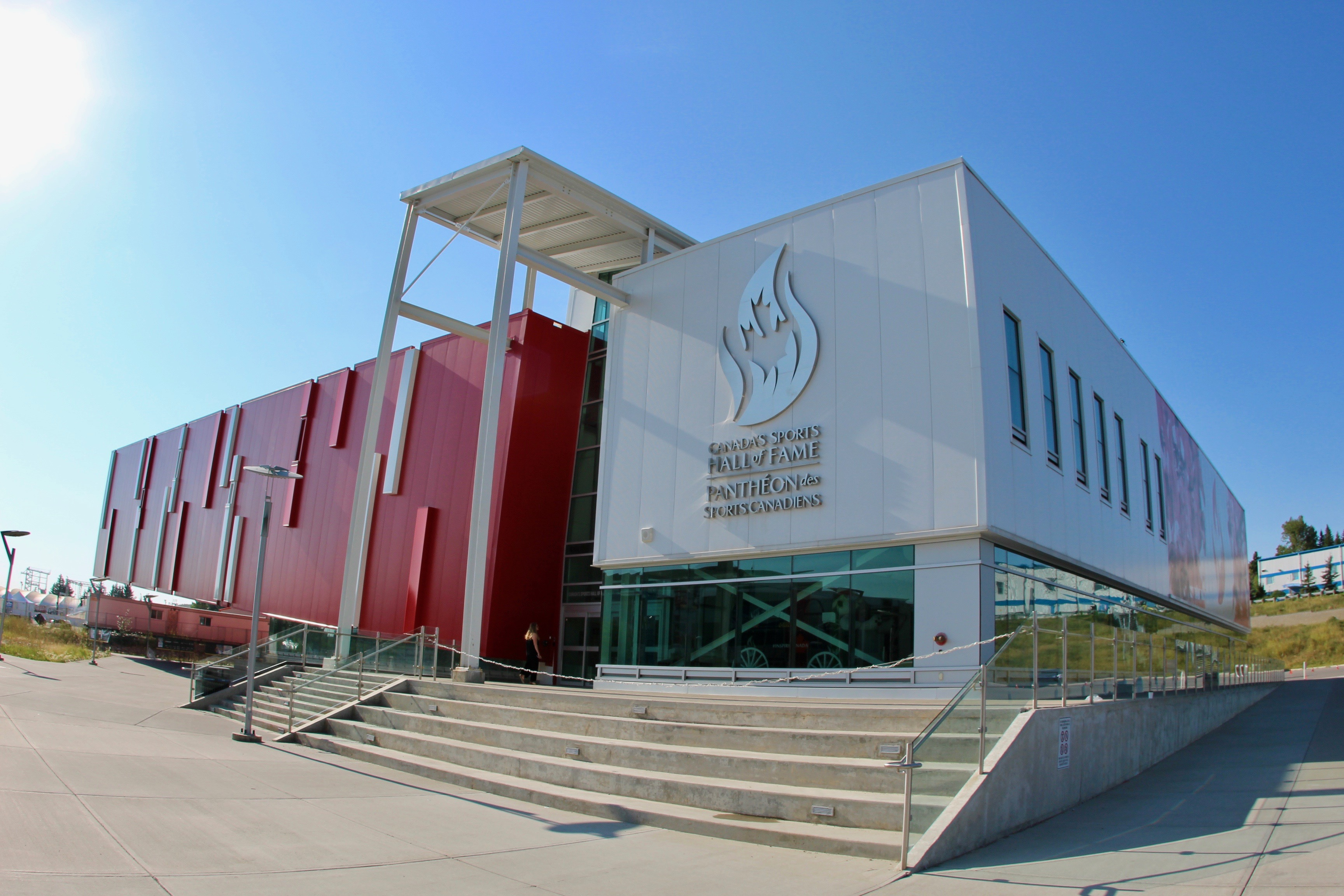
Canada's Sports Hall of Fame

Hamilton was made a life member of the SAHA in 1933, and was named sportsman of the year by the Regina Optimist International Club. He received the King George VI Coronation Medal in 1937, for his contributions to sports in Saskatchewan and Canada. In 1953, Hamilton was named a recipient of the Gold Stick Award by the Ontario Hockey Association for contributions to ice hockey.

Hamilton was inducted into the Saskatchewan Sports Hall of Fame in 1967. He was presented with the Award of Merit from the CAHA at the annual meeting in Saskatoon, on May 20, 1967. In 1968, he was inducted into both the Canadian Olympic Hall of Fame, and the Amateur Athletic Union of Canada Hall of Fame.

Hamilton was inducted into Canada's Sports Hall of Fame in June 1972, in the sports builder category. He was made the namesake of the Jack Hamilton Arena in Regina in 1975. He is also the namesake of the J. W. Hamilton Trophy awarded to the champion of the senior men's D-division playoffs of the Saskatchewan Hockey Association.

== Bibliography ==
- Mlazgar, Brian; Stoffel, Holden (2007). Saskatchewan Sports: Lives Past and Present. Regina, Saskatchewan: University of Regina Press. ISBN 978-0-88977-167-3.
- Ferguson, Bob (2005). Who's Who in Canadian Sport, Volume 4. Markham, Ontario: Fitzhenry & Whiteside Ltd. ISBN 1-55041-855-6.
