= Hockey Saskatchewan =

Ice hockey governing body in Saskatchewan

- Sport: Ice hockey
- Jurisdiction: Saskatchewan
- Founded: 1906
- Affiliation: Hockey Canada
- Headquarters: Regina
- Location: 2 - 575 Park Street
- Chairman: Tim Hubic

Official website
- hockeysask.ca
- (Canada)
- (Saskatchewan)

Hockey Saskatchewan is the governing body of all ice hockey in Saskatchewan. Hockey Saskatchewan is a branch of Hockey Canada. Hockey Saskatchewan was established as the Saskatchewan Amateur Hockey Association in 1906, and was later known as the Saskatchewan Hockey Association.

== History ==
The Saskatchewan Amateur Hockey Association (SAHA) was established in 1906 to govern ice hockey in the province of Saskatchewan. Its senior ice hockey teams began competing for the Allan Cup in 1909. The SAHA became a charter member of the Canadian Amateur Hockey Association when the national body was established in 1914. Junior ice hockey teams from Saskatchewan began competing for the Memorial Cup in 1919.

The SAHA later shortened its name to the Saskatchewan Hockey Association (SHA). The SHA rebranded itself as Hockey Saskatchewan in 2021, to bring itself inline with the naming convention used by Hockey Canada, and to avoid confusion with the Saskatchewan Health Authority which also used SHA as an acronym.

In the 2024–25 season, Hockey Canada and its four western affiliates – BC Hockey, Hockey Alberta, Hockey Saskatchewan and Hockey Manitoba – piloted the Western Canadian Development Model (WCDM). Under the WCDM, junior leagues will adopt most of the Western Hockey League rulebook, excluding some sections, and restrictions on 15-year-old affiliate players in the Western Hockey League were loosened. Players that will be 18-years of age or older in the calendar year were allowed to choose whether to use full-face protection or half-face protection, whilst younger players will be required to use full-face protection.

The WCDM was expanded in the 2025–26 season to include the following rules changes:

- Western Junior A teams will be permitted to register up to five U.S.-born players at one time on their active roster, a decrease from the previous six.
- 16- and 17-year-old U.S.-born players who have been drafted, listed or signed by a WHL team will be eligible to be rostered by any Western Junior A team.
- Each Western Junior A team will be eligible to roster one 16- or 17-year-old player whose parent(s) reside(s) outside of their province or region, if the player has been drafted, listed or signed by a WHL team
  - Up to a maximum of 23 such players across all Western Junior A teams, or one player from each WHL team.
- Out-of-province players who participate in the Canadian Sport School Hockey League (CSSHL) will be eligible to affiliate with Western Junior A teams in their school’s respective province or region.
- No more than eight players born in a province not participating in the WCDM may be registered on the active roster of a Western Junior A team.

== Leagues ==
- Highway Hockey League (Senior)
- Qu’Appelle Valley Hockey League (Senior)
- Saskatchewan Junior Hockey League (Junior "A")
- Prairie Junior Hockey League (Junior "B")
- Qu'Appelle Valley Hockey League (Junior "C")
- Saskatchewan Midget AAA Hockey League (Minor)
- Saskatchewan Female Midget AAA Hockey League (Minor)

== Former leagues ==
- Saskatchewan Junior Hockey League (1948–1966) (Junior "A")
- Western Canada Junior Hockey League (1948–1956) (Junior "A")

== Notable people ==
- Frederick E. Betts, SAHA president 1919–1920
- Dave Dryburgh, SAHA secretary 1930s–1940s
- Jack Hamilton, SAHA president 1925–1927
- Al Pickard, SAHA president 1941–1943
- Gordon Juckes, SAHA president 1953–1955

== See also ==
- List of ice hockey teams in Saskatchewan
