= 1932 Allan Cup =

Canadian senior ice hockey championship

The Allan Cup trophy

The 1932 Allan Cup was the Canadian senior ice hockey championship for the 1931–32 season. The trophy was won by the Toronto National Sea Fleas. This team went on to represent Canada at the 1933 World Ice Hockey Championships held in Prague, Czechoslovakia where the team lost the final game to the United States in overtime to capture the silver medal for Canada.

The 1932 team which won the Allan Cup was coached by Harry Watson, who as a player had won an Olympic gold medal with a 1924 Toronto Granites. Watson stepped down as head coach prior to the 1933 World Championships, to be replaced by Harold Ballard for the 1933 world championship tournament.

Canadian Amateur Hockey Association president Jack Hamilton responded to threats of growing professionalism in hockey by having all players taking part in provincial finals for the 1932 Allan Cup and 1932 Memorial Cup playoffs recite an oath similar to the Olympic Oath, and declare they meet all amateur requirements. Any violation of the oath would render the player's team ineligible for the remainder of the playoffs.

== Final ==
Best of three series held in Montreal.

- Monday, April 4: Toronto 7 - Fort William 4
- Wednesday, April 6: Toronto 1 - Fort William 0
