= Saskatchewan Junior Hockey League (1948–1966) =

Canadian junior ice hockey league

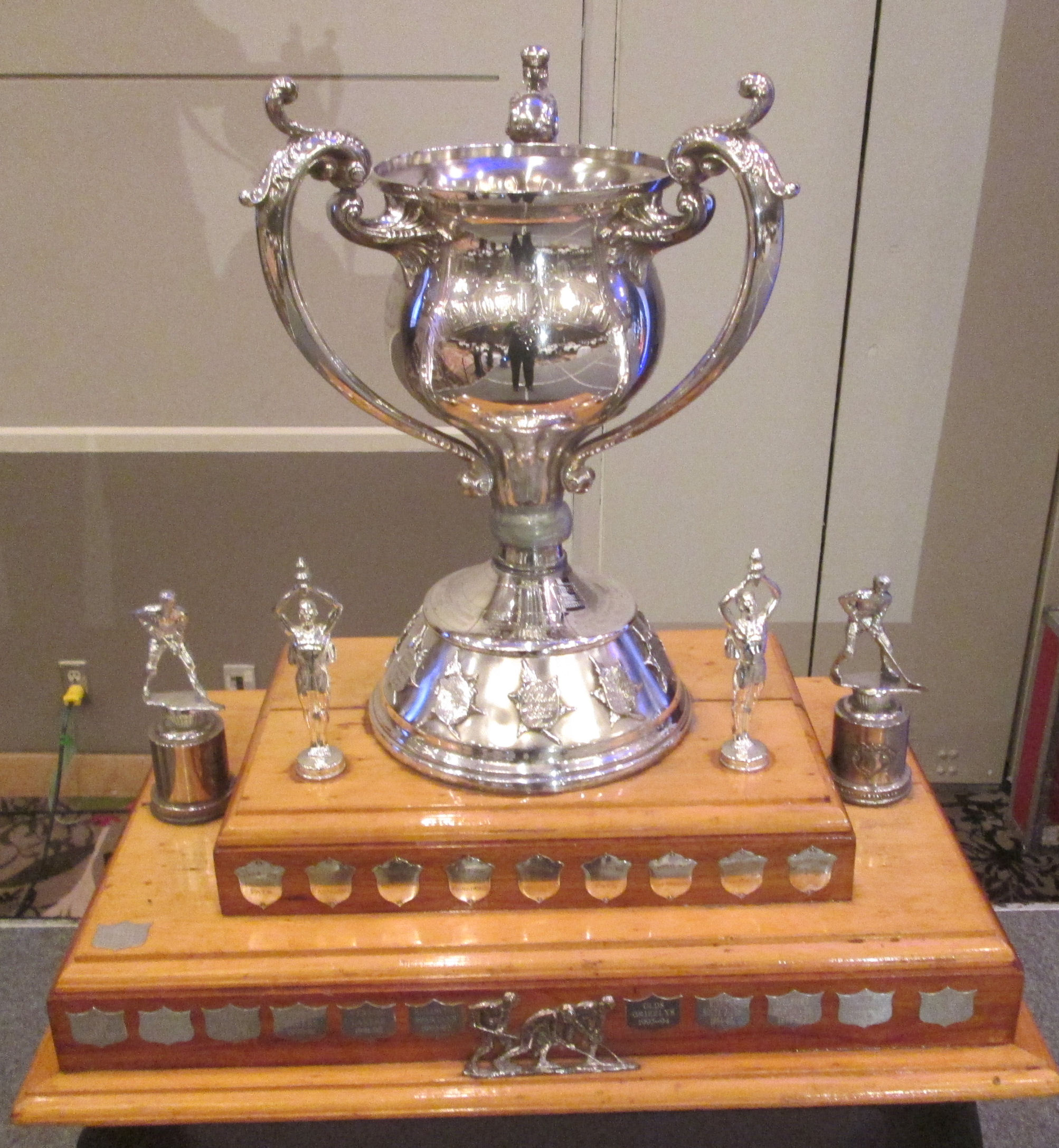
The Abbott Cup was the championship trophy for junior ice hockey in Western Canada.

The Saskatchewan Junior Hockey League was a junior ice hockey based in Saskatchewan and Manitoba from 1948 until 1966. It operated under the jurisdiction of the Saskatchewan Amateur Hockey Association. Two of its teams won the Abbott Cup as the junior champions of Western Canada, and the Flin Flon Bombers won the Memorial Cup as the national junior champion of Canada in 1957. Frank Boucher served as commissioner of the league from 1959 to 1966. The league disbanded when five of its eight teams joined the newly formed Canadian Major Junior Hockey League.

== History ==
The Saskatchewan Junior Hockey League (SJHL) began play as the North Saskatchewan Junior Hockey League for the 1948–49 season, and was formed in response to teams in South Saskatchewan and Alberta combining to establish the Western Canada Junior Hockey League. The North Saskatchewan Junior Hockey League renamed itself to the Saskatchewan Junior Hockey League for the 1950–51 season.

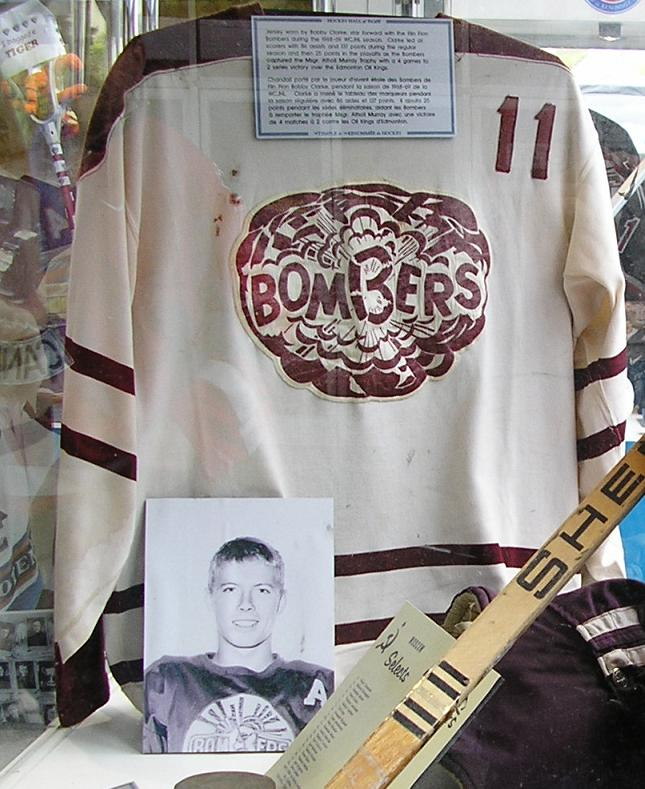
Flin Flon Bombers jersey c. 1967

The league operated under the jurisdiction of the Saskatchewan Amateur Hockey Association, and its teams were eligible for the national junior hockey playoffs as organized by the Canadian Amateur Hockey Association (CAHA). The SJHL and other junior teams in Western Canada addressed the imbalance in Memorial Cup competition in a meeting with CAHA president W. B. George in August 1954. The teams sought permission for any league champion to add three players in the inter-provincial playoffs for the Memorial Cup, and contended that the imbalance in competition caused lack of spectator interest and less prestige for the event. At the next CAHA meeting in January 1955, the request for three additional players for the Abbott Cup representative was approved. Two teams from the SJHL won the Abbott Cup as the junior champions of Western Canada; which included the Flin Flon Bombers in 1957, and the Regina Pats in 1958. Flin Flon also won the Memorial Cup in 1957, as the national junior champion of Canada.

Frank Boucher served as commissioner of the Saskatchewan Junior Hockey League from 1959 to 1966. He proposed to establish a junior hockey league of the best twelve teams in Canada sponsored by the National Hockey League (NHL), and to compete for a trophy at a higher tier than the Memorial Cup. CAHA president Art Potter and the resolutions committee were against increasing NHL influence into amateur hockey in Canada and declined to present the proposal at the semi-annual meeting. Potter also wanted more study into programs to support continued junior hockey growth and the Memorial Cup. Boucher and team owners in Saskatchewan and Manitoba accused Potter and the CAHA of disregarding their concerns and favouring the Edmonton Oil Kings. Boucher threatened to withdraw the SJHL from the Memorial Cup playoffs, due to the "unfair domination of western junior hockey by the Edmonton Oil Kings", since they had the pick of all the players from Alberta and used loopholes in rules to import stronger players. After a playoffs game between the Edmonton Oil Kings and the Estevan Bruins in April 1963, Potter announced that broadcast rights for CAHA games by Ken Newmans of CHAB in Moose Jaw, and Linus Westerbeg of CKOS-TV in Yorkton, had been indefinitely suspended. Potter stated that the suspensions resulted from "continuously and severely criticizing officials, thereby giving an erroneous picture of the game as played".

The SJHL disbanded following the 1965–66 season, when five of its eight teams joined the newly formed Canadian Major Junior Hockey League (CMJHL). The two Manitoba-based teams joined the Manitoba Junior Hockey League, and the Melville Millionaires suspended operations. The Saskatchewan Amateur Junior Hockey League was established in 1968, and included teams which formerly played in the SJHL and the CMJHL.

== Teams ==
List of teams that played in the SJHL:

Team name	Seasons	City
Brandon Wheat Kings	1964–1966	Brandon, Manitoba
Estevan Bruins	1957–1966	Estevan, Saskatchewan
Flin Flon Bombers	1948–1966	Flin Flon, Manitoba
Humboldt Indians	1948–1955	Humboldt, Saskatchewan
Humboldt-Melfort Indians	1955–1957	Humboldt, Saskatchewan
Melville Millionaires	1955–1966	Melville, Saskatchewan
Moose Jaw Canucks	1958–1966	Moose Jaw, Saskatchewan
Prince Albert Mintos	1948–1962	Prince Albert, Saskatchewan
Regina Pats	1956–1966	Regina, Saskatchewan
Saskatoon Junior Quakers	1948–1949	Saskatoon, Saskatchewan
Saskatoon Wesleys	1949–1955	Saskatoon, Saskatchewan
Saskatoon Junior Quakers	1956–1964	Saskatoon, Saskatchewan
Saskatoon Blades	1964–1966	Saskatoon, Saskatchewan
Weyburn Red Wings	1961–1966	Weyburn, Saskatchewan
Yorkton Terriers	1955–1956	Yorkton, Saskatchewan

== Standings ==
=== 1948–49 season ===
Rank	Team	Games	Wins	Losses	Ties	Points	GF	GA
1	Prince Albert Mintos	24	15	8	1	31	120	96
2	Humboldt Indians	24	13	9	2	28	115	101
3	Saskatoon Junior Quakers	24	12	10	2	26	99	94
4	Flin Flon Bombers	24	5	18	1	11	76	119

=== 1949–50 season ===
Standings include one-point games between Humboldt and Prince Albert.

Rank	Team	Games	Wins	Losses	Ties	Points	GF	GA
1	Prince Albert Mintos	28	16	8	4	32	142	119
2	Flin Flon Bombers	24	14	9	1	29	129	109
3	Humboldt Indians	28	13	11	4	26	135	120
4	Saskatoon Wesleys	24	3	18	3	9	75	133

=== 1950–51 season ===
Rank	Team	Games	Wins	Losses	Ties	Points	GF	GA
1	Flin Flon Bombers	36	24	11	1	49	189	147
2	Prince Albert Mintos	36	21	15	0	42	199	167
3	Saskatoon Wesleys	36	17	18	1	35	208	186
4	Humboldt Indians	36	8	26	2	18	157	265

=== 1951–52 season ===
The 1951–52 season scheduled included games against the Western Canada Junior Hockey League.

Rank	Team	Games	Wins	Losses	Ties	Points	GF	GA
1	Humboldt Indians	50	23	25	2	48	172	189
2	Saskatoon Wesleys	50	21	24	5	47	192	239
3	Prince Albert Mintos	50	20	26	4	44	198	245
4	Flin Flon Bombers	50	18	27	5	41	211	236

=== 1952–53 season ===
Al Pickard was elected to be the league's governor.

Rank	Team	Games	Wins	Losses	Ties	Points	GF	GA
1	Flin Flon Bombers	45	30	13	2	62	200	183
2	Humboldt Indians	45	22	22	1	45	184	166
3	Saskatoon Wesleys	47	21	26	0	42	195	207
4	Prince Albert Mintos	47	17	29	1	35	204	227

=== 1953–54 season ===
Al Pickard was re-elected to be the league's governor.

Rank	Team	Games	Wins	Losses	Ties	Points	GF	GA
1	Prince Albert Mintos	48	28	18	2	58	219	206
2	Flin Flon Bombers	48	27	21	0	54	297	204
3	Humboldt Indians	48	20	25	3	43	163	202
4	Saskatoon Wesleys	48	18	29	1	37	172	219

=== 1954–55 season ===
Rank	Team	Games	Wins	Losses	Ties	Points	GF	GA
1	Humboldt Indians	48	28	19	1	57	235	176
2	Flin Flon Bombers	48	23	24	1	47	218	215
3	Prince Albert Mintos	47	22	25	0	44	182	218
4	Saskatoon Wesleys	47	21	26	0	42	170	196

=== 1955–56 season ===
Rank	Team	Games	Wins	Losses	Ties	Points	GF	GA
1	Flin Flon Bombers	48	37	10	1	75	301	149
2	Prince Albert Mintos	50	33	14	3	68	255	162
3	Yorkton Terriers	48	20	26	2	42	185	201
4	Humboldt-Melfort Indians	50	21	29	0	39	199	190
5	Melville Millionaires	48	8	40	0	16	126	364

=== 1956–57 season ===
Flin Flon won ten games valued at one point instead of two points.

Rank	Team	Games	Wins	Losses	Ties	Points	GF	GA
1	Flin Flon Bombers	55	48	5	2	88	326	114
2	Regina Pats	51	32	16	3	67	225	163
3	Prince Albert Mintos	51	30	19	2	62	234	178
4	Humboldt-Melfort Indians	51	18	28	5	41	178	217
5	Melville Millionaires	51	20	31	0	40	168	226
6	Saskatoon Junior Quakers	51	1	50	0	2	102	322

=== 1957–58 season ===
Rank	Team	Games	Wins	Losses	Ties	Points	GF	GA
1	Regina Pats	51	36	12	3	75	246	160
2	Prince Albert Mintos	51	33	16	2	68	237	160
3	Flin Flon Bombers	55	28	25	2	48	220	177
4	Estevan Bruins	51	22	29	0	44	199	206
5	Saskatoon Junior Quakers	51	20	28	3	43	156	203
6	Melville Millionaires	51	10	39	2	22	134	256

=== 1958–59 season ===
Moose Jaw played most of its games in Weyburn due to a delay in replacing their home arena which had been damaged in a storm.

Rank	Team	Games	Wins	Losses	Ties	Points	GF	GA
1	Flin Flon Bombers	48	35	12	1	71	269	144
2	Estevan Bruins	48	30	16	2	62	207	163
3	Regina Pats	48	27	17	4	58	162	139
4	Saskatoon Junior Quakers	48	20	26	2	42	224	243
5	Melville Millionaires	48	20	26	2	42	181	174
6	Prince Albert Mintos	48	17	27	4	38	213	231
7	Moose Jaw Canucks	48	11	36	1	23	166	328

=== 1959–60 season ===
Games played in Flin Flon were allotted 2.5 points each.

Rank	Team	Games	Wins	Losses	Ties	Points	GF	GA
1	Flin Flon Bombers	54	35	16	3	82	301	189
2	Regina Pats	59	36	17	6	79	234	142
3	Prince Albert Mintos	59	35	22	2	72	298	237
4	Saskatoon Junior Quakers	59	32	23	4	69	258	232
5	Melville Millionaires	59	25	29	5	55	218	223
6	Estevan Bruins	59	23	33	3	49	187	257
7	Moose Jaw Canucks	59	6	52	1	13	161	378

=== 1960–61 season ===
Rank	Team	Games	Wins	Losses	Ties	Points	GF	GA
1	Regina Pats	60	38	17	5	81	282	177
2	Estevan Bruins	60	36	16	8	80	279	176
3	Melville Millionaires	60	30	22	8	69	270	233
4	Moose Jaw Canucks	60	24	26	10	58	181	212
5	Flin Flon Bombers	60	25	28	7	57	184	203
6	Saskatoon Junior Quakers	60	23	32	5	51	231	280
7	Prince Albert Mintos	60	10	45	5	25	157	303

=== 1961–62 season ===
Prince Albert played the season in Dauphin, Manitoba due to a fire at their arena.

Rank	Team	Games	Wins	Losses	Ties	Points	GF	GA
1	Estevan Bruins	56	34	10	12	80	234	127
2	Regina Pats	56	33	16	7	73	237	156
3	Flin Flon Bombers	56	29	22	5	63	244	199
4	Melville Millionaires	56	26	25	5	57	217	223
5	Moose Jaw Canucks	56	22	25	9	53	199	225
6	Saskatoon Junior Quakers	56	22	26	8	52	185	223
7	Weyburn Red Wings	55	18	30	7	43	165	185
8	Prince Albert Mintos	55	11	41	3	25	146	287

=== 1962–63 season ===
Rank	Team	Games	Wins	Losses	Ties	Points	GF	GA
1	Estevan Bruins	54	32	18	4	68	186	139
2	Melville Millionaires	54	31	18	5	67	246	178
3	Weyburn Red Wings	54	28	20	6	62	195	169
4	Moose Jaw Canucks	54	25	22	7	57	212	188
5	Regina Pats	54	22	24	8	52	210	195
6	Saskatoon Junior Quakers	54	16	34	4	36	175	270
7	Flin Flon Bombers	54	17	35	2	36	152	237

=== 1963–64 season ===
The Edmonton Oil Kings, a junior hockey team participating in the Central Alberta Hockey League for senior level teams, played an interlocking schedule of two games against each of the seven teams in the SJHL during the 1963–64 season.

Rank	Team	Games	Wins	Losses	Ties	Points	GF	GA
1	Estevan Bruins	62	35	19	8	78	259	196
2	Regina Pats	62	31	22	9	71	332	249
3	Saskatoon Junior Quakers	62	32	27	3	67	290	287
4	Weyburn Red Wings	62	26	27	9	61	242	261
5	Moose Jaw Canucks	62	26	30	6	58	290	352
6	Flin Flon Bombers	62	19	32	11	49	262	304
7	Melville Millionaires	62	18	36	8	44	226	297
n/a	Edmonton Oil Kings	14	9	2	3	21	88	43

=== 1964–65 season ===
Rank	Team	Games	Wins	Losses	Ties	Points	GF	GA
1	Regina Pats	56	38	10	8	84	314	195
2	Weyburn Red Wings	56	36	17	3	75	286	206
3	Brandon Wheat Kings	56	30	21	5	65	230	216
4	Estevan Bruins	56	27	26	3	57	245	211
5	Flin Flon Bombers	56	21	29	6	48	255	298
6	Saskatoon Blades	56	20	32	4	44	219	268
7	Moose Jaw Canucks	56	19	34	3	41	211	286
8	Melville Millionaires	56	13	35	8	34	207	287

=== 1965–66 season ===
Rank	Team	Games	Wins	Losses	Ties	Points	GF	GA
1	Estevan Bruins	60	44	11	5	93	373	155
2	Weyburn Red Wings	60	38	16	6	82	300	183
3	Brandon Wheat Kings	60	32	21	7	71	283	262
4	Moose Jaw Canucks	60	33	23	4	70	295	229
5	Regina Pats	60	28	25	7	63	312	260
6	Saskatoon Blades	60	20	37	3	43	240	310
7	Melville Millionaires	60	18	37	5	41	235	348
8	Flin Flon Bombers	60	8	51	1	17	199	490
