= Western Canada Junior Hockey League (1948–1956) =

Canadian junior ice hockey league

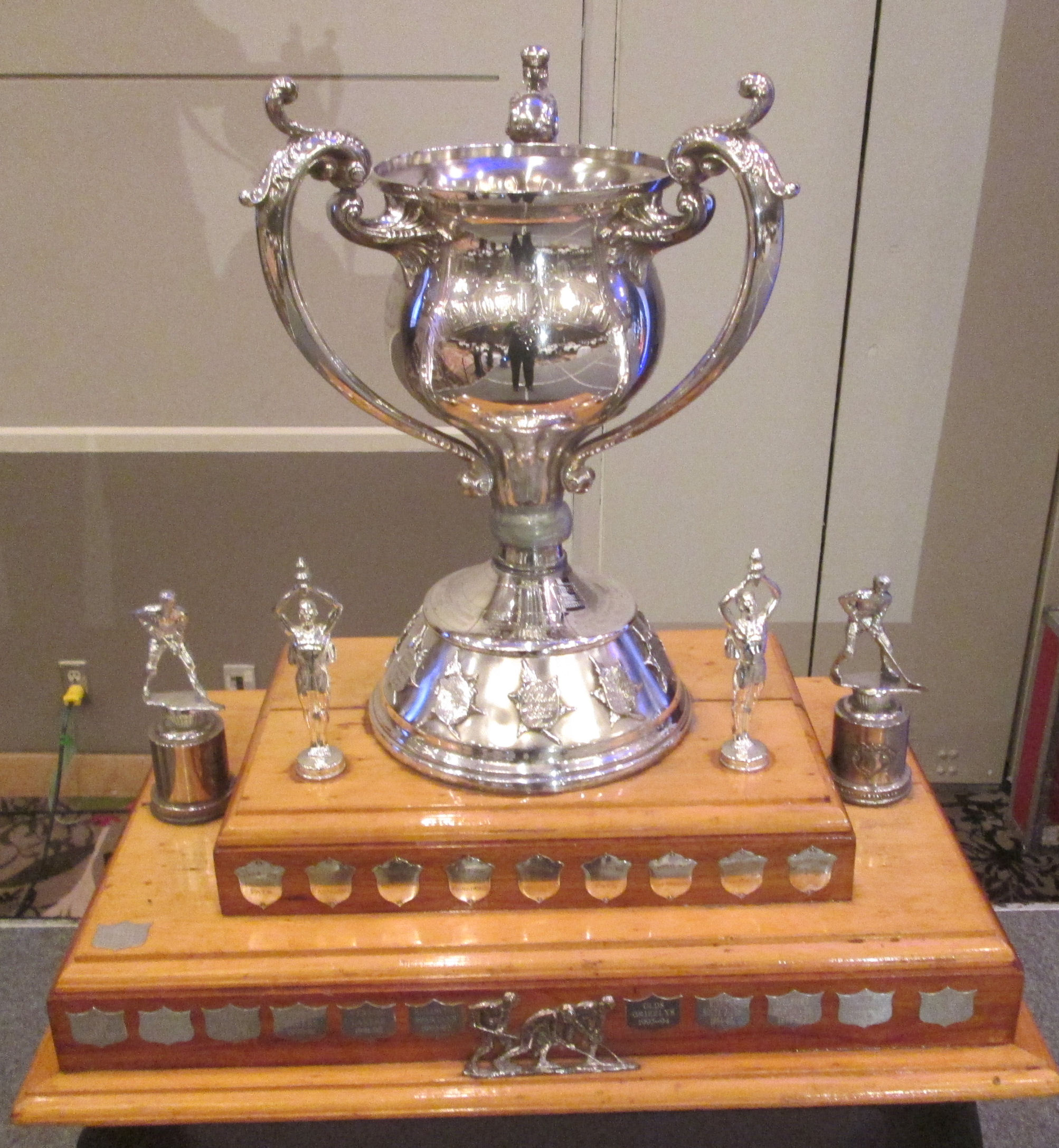
The Abbott Cup was the championship trophy for junior ice hockey in Western Canada.

The Western Canada Junior Hockey League was a junior ice hockey based in Alberta and Saskatchewan from 1948 until 1956. It was formed by teams which sought a higher level of competition and more formal organization. Its teams were eligible for the Memorial Cup as the national junior champion of the Canadian Amateur Hockey Association, and were runners-up in five seasons as the Abbott Cup junior champion of Western Canada.

== History ==
The Western Canada Junior Hockey League (WCJHL) formed in 1948 after junior ice hockey teams from Alberta and Saskatchewan wanted to form a league with a higher level of competition with more formal organization by a dedicated league governor rather than a provincial governing body. All four teams from the Southern Alberta Junior Hockey League combined with two teams from the Saskatchewan Junior Hockey League to become a six-team league. The remaining junior teams in Saskatchewan reorganized as the South Saskatchewan Junior Hockey League for the 1948–49 season. Earlier in 1948, the stronger junior teams based in Saskatchewan and Manitoba proposed an inter-provincial league. Manitoba Amateur Hockey Association president Jimmy Dunn was opposed to the idea since he felt it would have a negative effect on junior hockey in Winnipeg.

The WCJHL operated under the joint jurisdiction of the Alberta Amateur Hockey Association and the Saskatchewan Amateur Hockey Association, and participated in the playoffs for the Memorial Cup as organized by the Canadian Amateur Hockey Association (CAHA). Teams from the WCJHL won the Abbott Cup as the junior champions of Western Canada in five seasons, which included the Regina Pats in 1950, 1952, 1955, 1956, and the Edmonton Oil Kings in 1954. In each of these seasons, the WCJHL champion lost to the Eastern Canada champion at the head-to-head Memorial Cup national junior championship.

The WCJHL and other junior teams in Western Canada addressed the imbalance in Memorial Cup competition in a meeting with CAHA president W. B. George in August 1954. The teams sought permission for the champions of any western leagues to add three players from their own league starting in the inter-provincial playoffs to determine the western representative for the Memorial Cup, and contended that the imbalance in competition caused lack of spectator interest and less prestige for the event. At the next CAHA meeting in January 1955, the request for three additional players for the Abbott Cup representative was approved.

The WCJHL folded in 1958 and three of the remaining four teams returned to their respective provincial junior leagues. The exception was the Edmonton Oil Kings, which joined the Central Alberta Hockey League, a senior ice hockey league.

=== Governors ===
List of league governors:

- Red Dutton (1948 to 1951)
- Al Pickard (1951 to 1953)
- Ken Doraty (1953 to 1956)

=== Teams ===
List of teams that played in the WCJHL:

Team name	Seasons	City
Bellevue Lions	1948–1949	Bellevue, Alberta
Crow's Nest Pass Lions	1949–1951	Bellevue, Alberta
Crow's Nest Pass Coalers	1951–1953	Bellevue, Alberta
Calgary Buffaloes	1948–1954	Calgary, Alberta
Edmonton Oil Kings	1951–1956	Edmonton, Alberta
Lethbridge Native Sons	1948–1956	Lethbridge, Alberta
Medicine Hat Tigers	1948–1956	Medicine Hat, Alberta
Moose Jaw Canucks	1948–1955	Moose Jaw, Saskatchewan
Regina Pats	1948–1956	Regina, Saskatchewan

== Standings ==
=== 1948–49 season ===
Rank	Team	Games	Wins	Losses	Ties	Points	GF	GA
1	Calgary Buffaloes	32	20	9	3	52	188	123
2	Moose Jaw Canucks	26	17	8	1	52	139	94
3	Regina Pats	26	11	14	1	40	99	126
4	Lethbridge Native Sons	32	13	19	0	36	105	139
5	Medicine Hat Tigers	31	11	17	3	30	123	147
6	Bellevue Lions	32	14	18	0	30	166	185

=== 1949–50 season ===
Rank	Team	Games	Wins	Losses	Ties	Points	GF	GA
1	Lethbridge Native Sons	40	30	10	0	60	232	139
2	Moose Jaw Canucks	40	22	18	0	44	162	180
3	Regina Pats	40	19	20	1	39	182	182
4	Medicine Hat Tigers	40	17	21	2	36	174	194
5	Crow's Nest Pass Lions	40	16	24	0	32	191	221
6	Calgary Buffaloes	40	14	25	1	29	139	160

=== 1950–51 season ===
Rank	Team	Games	Wins	Losses	Ties	Points	GF	GA
1	Lethbridge Native Sons	40	29	10	1	59	226	130
2	Regina Pats	40	26	12	2	54	207	126
3	Crow's Nest Pass Lions	40	18	20	2	38	175	197
4	Medicine Hat Tigers	40	18	21	1	37	150	218
5	Moose Jaw Canucks	40	16	22	2	34	147	160
6	Calgary Buffaloes	40	8	30	2	18	119	192

=== 1951–52 season ===
Rank	Team	Games	Wins	Losses	Ties	Points	GF	GA
1	Regina Pats	44	30	11	3	63	229	127
2	Edmonton Oil Kings	44	29	14	1	59	234	160
3	Lethbridge Native Sons	44	27	15	2	56	232	168
4	Calgary Buffaloes	44	21	19	4	46	181	146
5	Moose Jaw Canucks	44	21	23	0	42	178	171
6	Crow's Nest Pass Coalers	44	18	25	1	37	219	289
7	Medicine Hat Tigers	44	11	30	3	25	171	247

=== 1952–53 season ===
Rank	Team	Games	Wins	Losses	Ties	Points	GF	GA
1	Edmonton Oil Kings	36	28	6	2	58	218	97
2	Regina Pats	36	23	11	2	48	165	135
3	Lethbridge Native Sons	36	19	12	5	43	214	166
4	Calgary Buffaloes	36	15	17	4	34	171	182
5	Moose Jaw Canucks	36	13	23	0	26	164	209
6	Medicine Hat Tigers	36	12	22	2	26	158	207
7	Crow's Nest Pass Coalers	36	8	27	1	17	145	239

=== 1953–54 season ===
Rank	Team	Games	Wins	Losses	Ties	Points	GF	GA
1	Edmonton Oil Kings	36	33	3	0	55	263	84
2	Regina Pats	36	23	13	0	39	182	119
3	Lethbridge Native Sons	36	19	17	0	30	183	171
4	Moose Jaw Canucks	36	17	19	0	29	166	191
5	Medicine Hat Tigers	36	13	23	0	22	144	187
6	Calgary Buffaloes	36	3	33	0	5	121	307

=== 1954–55 season ===
Rank	Team	Games	Wins	Losses	Ties	Points	GF	GA
1	Regina Pats	40	30	10	0	60	220	116
2	Lethbridge Native Sons	40	25	15	0	50	169	163
3	Edmonton Oil Kings	40	23	16	1	47	173	115
4	Medicine Hat Tigers	40	16	23	1	33	163	167
5	Moose Jaw Canucks	40	5	35	0	10	100	264

=== 1955–56 season ===
Rank	Team	Games	Wins	Losses	Ties	Points	GF	GA
1	Regina Pats	36	24	11	1	49	181	132
2	Edmonton Oil Kings	36	17	19	0	34	150	143
3	Lethbridge Native Sons	48	24	24	0	32	223	233
4	Medicine Hat Tigers	48	18	29	1	29	173	219
