= Regina Exhibition Stadium =

Indoor arena at Evraz Place in Regina, Saskatchewan, Canada

Coordinates: 50°27′10.0″N 104°38′25.0″W

Regina Exhibition Stadium, also known as Regina Stadium and Queen City Gardens, was an indoor arena at Evraz Place in Regina, Saskatchewan.

Constructed in 1919, the venue was home arena of the Regina Pats of the Western Hockey League before the construction of the Agridome in 1977. The venue was notable for its use in agricultural exhibitions, sporting events, and concerts.

Jack Hamilton served as president of the Regina Rink Company which raised funds to install an artificial ice maker in the Regina Stadium. He operated the rink for 11 years from 1938 to 1949, when it was known as the Queen City Gardens.

In 2015, the arena was used as a filming location for Chokeslam, a professional wrestling-themed romantic comedy film. By 2017, the arena had been described as "deteriorating", and contrasting to other new developments at the grounds such as Mosaic Stadium. In 2017, Regina Exhibition Stadium was demolished in order to construct the International Trade Centre, a new $37 million, 150,000 square-foot convention space that would link all of Evraz Place's indoor facilities.
