= Nakina Smith =

Canadian ice hockey player

- Born: July 26, 1913 Cache Bay, Ontario, Canada
- Died: March 19, 1982 (aged 68) Ottawa, Ontario, Canada
- Height: 5 ft 10 in (178 cm)
- Weight: 150 lb (68 kg; 10 st 10 lb)
- Position: Centre
- Shot: Left
- Played for: Detroit Red Wings
- Playing career: 1933–1950

Joseph Dalton "Nakina" Smith (July 26, 1913 – March 19, 1982) was a Canadian ice hockey player. He was born in Cache Bay, Ontario, but grew up in Nakina, Ontario.

Smith played hockey between 1933 and 1950, including ten games in the National Hockey League with the Detroit Red Wings during the 1943–44 season.

== Career statistics ==
=== Regular season and playoffs ===
			Regular season					Playoffs
Season	Team	League	GP	G	A	Pts	PIM	GP	G	A	Pts	PIM
1931–32	Sudbury Cub-Wolves	NOJHA	3	5	2	7	4	—	—	—	—	—
1931–32	Sudbury Wolves	NOHA	9	7	2	9	6	—	—	—	—	—
1932–33	Sudbury Cub-Wolves	NOJHA	7	4	1	5	16	2	0	1	1	2
1933–34	Toronto Torontos	OHA Sr	5	4	3	7	7	2	0	0	0	0
1933–34	Toronto British Consols	TIHL	15	9	10	19	2	5	3	2	5	2
1934–35	Oshawa Chevies	TIHL	15	8	19	27	2	—	—	—	—	—
1935–36	Rochester Cardinals	IHL	34	5	8	13	4	—	—	—	—	—
1935–36	London Tecumsehs	IHL	12	0	3	3	4	—	—	—	—	—
1936–37	New Haven Eagles	IAHL	46	4	17	21	10	—	—	—	—	—
1937–38	Minneapolis Millers	AHA	48	15	25	40	30	7	1	2	3	0
1938–39	Minneapolis Millers	AHA	48	30	52	82	10	4	1	0	1	0
1939–40	Minneapolis Millers	AHA	45	32	36	68	12	3	0	2	2	2
1940–41	St. Louis Flyers	AHA	46	6	21	27	8	9	3	5	8	10
1941–42	St. Louis Flyers	AHA	50	19	39	58	27	3	0	1	1	0
1942–43	New Haven Eagles	AHL	32	11	21	32	14	—	—	—	—	—
1942–43	Washington Lions	AHL	23	3	8	11	14	—	—	—	—	—
1942–43	Philadelphia Falcons	EHL	—	—	—	—	—	9	8	9	17	2
1943–44	Detroit Red Wings	NHL	10	1	2	3	0	—	—	—	—	—
1943–44	Indianapolis Capitals	AHL	34	11	23	34	11	5	0	1	1	0
1944–45	St. Louis Flyers	AHL	60	11	31	42	22	—	—	—	—	—
1945–46	Dallas Texans	USHL	25	5	13	18	2	—	—	—	—	—
1945–46	Minneapolis Millers	USHL	27	11	13	24	4	—	—	—	—	—
1945–46	Buffalo Bisons	AHL	3	0	3	3	0	—	—	—	—	—
1946–47	St. Paul Saints	USHL	60	14	32	46	6	—	—	—	—	—
1947–48	St. Paul Saints	USHL	53	9	13	22	2	—	—	—	—	—
1948–49	Los Angeles Monarchs	PCHL	63	34	28	62	34	7	0	4	4	10
1949–50	Los Angeles Monarchs	PCHL	1	0	1	1	0	—	—	—	—	—
AHA totals			237	102	173	275	87	26	5	10	15	12
NHL totals			10	1	2	3	0	—	—	—	—	—
