= List of WIHL seasons =

The following is a list of seasons for the Western International Hockey League. The WIHL was at top tier senior level ice hockey league that operated in North America from 1946 to 1962 and from 1963 to 1988.

== WIHL seasons ==
- 1946–47 WIHL season
- 1947–48 WIHL season
- 1948–49 WIHL season
- 1949–50 WIHL season
- 1950–51 WIHL season
- 1951–52 WIHL season
- 1952–53 WIHL season
- 1953–54 WIHL season
- 1954–55 WIHL season
- 1955–56 WIHL season
- 1956–57 WIHL season
- 1957–58 WIHL season
- 1958–59 WIHL season
- 1959–60 WIHL season
- 1960–61 WIHL season
- 1961–62 WIHL season
- 1963–64 WIHL season
- 1964–65 WIHL season
- 1965–66 WIHL season
- 1966–67 WIHL season
- 1967–68 WIHL season
- 1968–69 WIHL season
- 1969–70 WIHL season
- 1970–71 WIHL season
- 1971–72 WIHL season
- 1972–73 WIHL season
- 1973–74 WIHL season
- 1974–75 WIHL season
- 1975–76 WIHL season
- 1976–77 WIHL season
- 1977–78 WIHL season
- 1978–79 WIHL season
- 1979–80 WIHL season
- 1980–81 WIHL season
- 1981–82 WIHL season
- 1982–83 WIHL season
- 1983–84 WIHL season
- 1984–85 WIHL season
- 1985–86 WIHL season
- 1986–87 WIHL season
- 1987–88 WIHL season
