= Seth Martin =

Canadian ice hockey player (1933–2014)

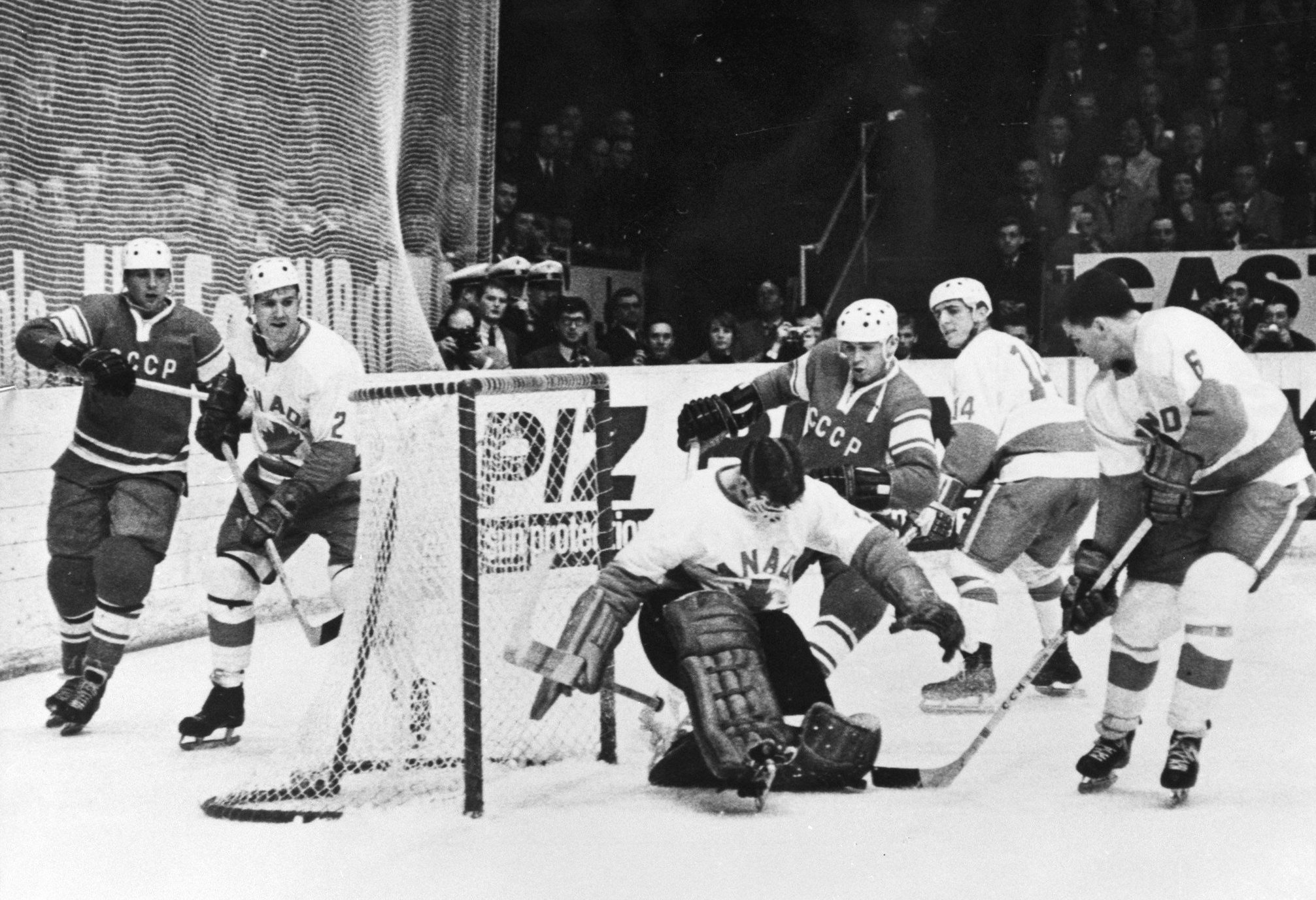
- Born: May 4, 1933 Rossland, British Columbia, Canada
- Died: September 6, 2014 (aged 81) Trail, BC, CAN
- Height: 5 ft 11 in (180 cm)
- Weight: 180 lb (82 kg; 12 st 12 lb)
- Position: Goaltender
- Caught: Left
- Played for: St. Louis Blues; Trail Smoke Eaters; Spokane Jets; Vancouver Canucks; Spokane Spokes; Portland Buckaroos
- National team: Canada
- Playing career: 1953–1973

Seth Martin
Medal record

Men's ice hockey

Representing Canada

World Championships
Gold medal – first place	1961 Switzerland	
Bronze medal – third place	1966 Yugoslavia	
Bronze medal – third place	1967 Austria	

Seth Martin (May 4, 1933 – September 6, 2014) was a Canadian ice hockey goalie. He played 30 games in the National Hockey League with the St. Louis Blues during the 1967–68 season. The rest of his career, which lasted from 1953 to 1973, was spent in senior and minor leagues. Internationally Martin played for the Canadian national team at four World Championships, winning a gold medal in 1961, and the 1964 Winter Olympics. He was inducted into the International Ice Hockey Federation Hall of Fame in 1997.

== Biography ==
Seth Martin helped the Trail Smoke Eaters win the 1961 World Championships as the last Canadian amateur team to win the World Championships. He was named the best goaltender of the tournament. He also played in four more World Championships with the Smoke Eaters where he was named best goaltender in three of the four tournaments. He played for the Canadian team at the 1964 Winter Olympics, where the team finished fourth. Martin played for the St. Louis Blues in their inaugural season of 1967–68, appearing in 30 games as backup for Glenn Hall. The Blues made it to the 1968 Stanley Cup Finals but lost in four consecutive games to the Montreal Canadiens.

After the season Martin had to choose between continuing his NHL career and keeping his firefighter's pension. He chose the latter and moved back to Trail, British Columbia but continued to play hockey and eventually coach. He died after a heart attack in 2014 in Trail at the age of 81.

== Career statistics ==
=== Regular season and playoffs ===
			Regular season									Playoffs
Season	Team	League	GP	W	L	T	MIN	GA	SO	GAA	SV%	GP	W	L	T	MIN	GA	SO	GAA	SV%
1950–51	Lethbridge Native Sons	WCJHL	30	—	—	—	1800	96	0	3.27	—	2	—	—	—	80	3	0	2.25	—
1951–52	Lethbridge Native Sons	WCJHL	36	23	12	1	2160	138	1	3.84	—	4	0	4	—	240	30	0	7.50	—
1952–53	Lethbridge Native Sons	WCJHL	27	17	6	4	1620	115	0	4.26	—	25	16	7	2	1540	30	0	3.74	—
1953–54	Trail Smoke Eaters	WIHL	28	—	—	—	1680	139	0	4.96	—	4	1	3	—	240	21	0	5.20	—
1953–54	Kelowna Packers	OSHL	3	—	—	—	180	7	0	2.33	—	—	—	—	—	—	—	—	—	—
1954–55	Trail Smoke Eaters	WIHL	28	—	—	—	1680	134	1	4.78	—	4	—	—	—	240	13	0	3.25	—
1955–56	Trail Smoke Eaters	WIHL	39	—	—	—	2340	183	0	4.69	—	10	5	5	—	600	35	1	3.50	—
1956–57	Trail Smoke Eaters	WIHL	26	—	—	—	1560	89	0	3.42	—	9	—	—	—	540	42	0	4.67	—
1957–58	Trail Smoke Eaters	WIHL	47	—	—	—	2820	211	1	4.49	—	7	3	4	—	420	29	0	4.14	—
1958–59	Trail Smoke Eaters	WIHL	39	17	20	2	2340	165	4	4.23	—	7	3	4	—	379	29	0	4.60	—
1959–60	Trail Smoke Eaters	WIHL	37	—	—	—	2220	185	0	5.00	—	11	9	2	—	660	45	1	4.09	—
1959–60	Spokane Spokes	WHL	2	0	2	0	120	8	0	4.00	—	—	—	—	—	—	—	—	—	—
1959–60	Vancouver Canucks	WHL	1	0	1	0	40	4	0	6.00	—	—	—	—	—	—	—	—	—	—
1959–60	Trail Smoke Eaters	Al-Cup	—	—	—	—	—	—	—	—	—	15	8	6	1	915	56	1	3.67	—
1960–61	Trail Smoke Eaters	WIHL	37	34	3	0	2220	111	0	3.00	—	13	11	1	—	780	30	0	2.31	—
1961–62	Portland Buckaroos	WHL	1	—	—	—	60	1	0	1.00	—	—	—	—	—	—	—	—	—	—
1961–62	Trail Smoke Eaters	WIHL	31	—	—	—	1860	112	2	3.70	—	—	—	—	—	—	—	—	—	—
1962–63	Canadian National Team	Intl	—	—	—	—	—	—	—	—	—	—	—	—	—	—	—	—	—	—
1963–64	Rossland Miners	WIHL	23	12	9	0	1380	90	1	3.91	—	5	2	3	—	300	22	0	4.40	—
1964–65	Rossland Warriors	WIHL	41	15	24	2	2460	192	0	4.68	—	—	—	—	—	—	—	—	—	—
1964–65	Nelson Maple Leafs	Al-Cup	—	—	—	—	—	—	—	—	—	12	7	5	0	700	40	2	3.43	—
1965–66	Rossland Warriors	WIHL	24	13	9	0	1380	104	0	4.52	—	1	0	1	—	60	5	0	5.00	—
1965–66	Nelson Maple Leafs	WIHL	1	0	0	0	20	1	0	3.00	—	—	—	—	—	—	—	—	—	—
1965–66	Kimberley Dynamiters	WIHL	—	—	—	—	—	—	—	—	—	1	0	1	—	60	3	0	3.00	—
1966–67	Rossland Warriors	WIHL	33	—	—	—	1980	158	0	4.79	—	—	—	—	—	—	—	—	—	—
1967–68	St. Louis Blues	NHL	30	8	10	7	1549	67	1	2.60	.914	—	—	—	—	—	—	—	—	—
1968–69	Trail Smoke Eaters	WIHL	17	—	—	—	1070	67	1	3.94	—	—	—	—	—	—	—	—	—	—
1969–70	Spokane Jets	WIHL	24	—	—	—	1440	56	3	2.33	—	7	7	0	—	420	9	1	1.29	—
1969–70	Spokane Jets	Al-Cup	—	—	—	—	—	—	—	—	—	11	9	2	0	660	24	2	2.18	—
1972–73	Spokane Jets	WIHL	3	—	—	—	180	14	0	4.66	—	—	—	—	—	—	—	—	—	—
1972–73	Portland Buckaroos	WHL	2	0	2	0	100	11	0	6.59	—	—	—	—	—	—	—	—	—	—
WIHL totals			502	—	—	—	30,010	2115	13	4.23	—	—	—	—	—	—	—	—	—	—
NHL totals			30	8	10	7	1549	67	1	2.60	.914	—	—	—	—	—	—	—	—	—

=== International ===
Year	Team	Event	GP	W	L	T	MIN	GA	SO	GAA	SV%
1961	Canada	WC	5	4	0	1	280	6	0	1.28	—
1963	Canada	WC	7	4	2	1	420	23	1	3.29	—
1964	Canada	OLY	6	4	1	0	247	5	1	1.21	—
1966	Canada	WC	4	2	2	0	240	8	0	2.00	—
1967	Canada	WC	6	3	2	1	360	14	0	2.33	—
Senior totals			28	17	7	3	1547	46	2	2.17	—
