= Ron Huston =

Canadian ice hockey player

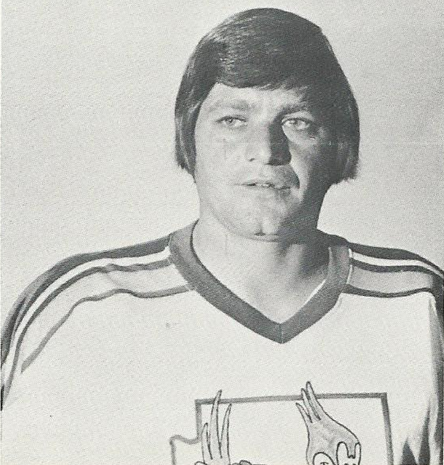
- Born: April 8, 1945 (age 80) Manitou, Manitoba, Canada
- Height: 5 ft 9 in (175 cm)
- Weight: 170 lb (77 kg; 12 st 2 lb)
- Position: Centre
- Shot: Right
- Played for: California Seals
- National team: Canada
- Playing career: 1965–1984

Ronald Earle Huston (born April 8, 1945 in Manitou, Manitoba) is a Canadian retired professional ice hockey forward who played 79 games in the National Hockey League for the California Golden Seals. He would also play 159 games in the World Hockey Association for the Phoenix Roadrunners. Huston returned to the Western International Hockey League for the start of the 1977-78 season as a member of the Spokane Flyers and led the league in scoring with 119 points. He followed the Spokane Flyers to the Pacific Hockey League the following season. When the Pacific Hockey League folded at the end of the 1978-79 season, he once again returned to the WIHL for the 1979-80 season, this time as a player-coach of the Cranbrook Royals, a team where he started his playing career after he completed his time in junior hockey with the Brandon Wheat Kings. He would continue his role as a player-coach when he moved on to the Elk Valley Blazers of the WIHL from the 1980-81 to the 1982-83 seasons.

After his retirement as a player, Huston worked as an electrician, a trade that he started when he was a member of the Cranbrook Royals in the latter half of the 1960s.

== Career statistics ==
			Regular season					Playoffs
Season	Team	League	GP	G	A	Pts	PIM	GP	G	A	Pts	PIM
1962–63	Brandon Wheat Kings	MJHL	20	5	9	14	4	2	0	0	0	0
1963–64	Brandon Wheat Kings	MJHL	30	20	30	50	15	9	3	5	8	0
1964–65	Brandon Wheat Kings	SJHL	52	18	21	39	20	8	5	1	6	2
1965–66	Cranbrook Royals	WIHL	49	39	42	81	4	—	—	—	—	—
1966–67	Cranbrook Royals	WIHL	39	23	36	59	12	—	—	—	—	—
1966–67	Jersey Devils	EHL-Sr.	4	1	0	1	0	—	—	—	—	—
1967–68	Cranbrook Royals	WIHL	44	38	43	81	4	—	—	—	—	—
1965–66	Portland Buckaroos	WHL-Sr.	3	0	0	0	0	—	—	—	—	—
1968–69	Cranbrook Royals	WIHL	47	45	43	88	4	—	—	—	—	—
1969–70	Seattle Totems	WHL-Sr.	5	0	2	2	0	—	—	—	—	—
1969–70	Cranbrook Royals	WIHL	47	36	53	89	10	5	5	2	7	2
1970–71	Calgary Stampeders	ASHL	40	23	19	42	2	—	—	—	—	—
1971–72	Spokane Jets	WIHL	49	39	47	86	30	12	5	10	15	0
1972–73	Salt Lake Golden Eagles	WHL-Sr.	72	42	42	84	21	9	6	7	13	2
1973–74	California Golden Seals	NHL	23	3	10	13	0	—	—	—	—	—
1973–74	Salt Lake Golden Eagles	WHL-Sr.	50	20	32	52	4	5	0	2	2	2
1974–75	California Golden Seals	NHL	56	12	21	33	8	—	—	—	—	—
1975–76	Phoenix Roadrunners	WHA	79	22	44	66	4	5	1	1	2	0
1976–77	Phoenix Roadrunners	WHA	80	20	39	59	10	—	—	—	—	—
1977–78	Spokane Flyers	WIHL	56	33	86	119	—	10	5	7	12	2
1978–79	Spokane Flyers	PHL	49	19	35	54	8	—	—	—	—	—
1979–80	Cranbrook Royals	WIHL	47	13	32	45	10	—	—	—	—	—
1980–81	Cranbrook Royals	WIHL	36	14	23	37	0	—	—	—	—	—
1981–82	Cranbrook Royals	WIHL	—	—	—	—	—	—	—	—	—	—
1982–83	Elk Valley Blazers	WIHL	—	32	32	64	—	—	—	—	—	—
1983–84	Elk Valley Blazers	WIHL	—	—	—	—	—	—	—	—	—	—
NHL totals			79	15	31	46	8	—	—	—	—	—
WHA totals			159	42	83	125	14	5	1	1	2	0
WIHL totals			414	312	437	749	74	27	15	19	34	4
