= Gordon Turlick =

Canadian ice hockey player

- Born: September 13, 1939 (age 87) Michel, British Columbia, Canada
- Height: 6 ft 1 in (185 cm)
- Weight: 190 lb (86 kg; 13 st 8 lb)
- Position: Left wing/Centre
- Shot: Left
- Played for: Boston Bruins
- Playing career: 1960–1974

Gordon A. "Gord" Turlick (born September 13, 1939) is a Canadian former professional ice hockey player who played two games in the National Hockey League with the Boston Bruins during the 1959–60 season. The rest of his career, which lasted from 1960 to 1972, was spent in various minor leagues.

== Career statistics ==
=== Regular season and playoffs ===
			Regular season					Playoffs
Season	Team	League	GP	G	A	Pts	PIM	GP	G	A	Pts	PIM
1957–58	Melville Millionaires	SJHL	16	1	2	3	6	—	—	—	—	—
1958–59	Melville Millionaires	SJHL	3	0	0	0	0	—	—	—	—	—
1958–59	Prince Albert Mintos	SJHL	32	7	9	16	33	5	0	1	1	4
1959–60	Prince Albert Mintos	SJHL	58	65	36	101	50	7	4	2	6	2
1959–60	Boston Bruins	NHL	2	0	0	0	0	—	—	—	—	—
1960–61	Sudbury Wolves	EPHL	5	0	0	0	4	—	—	—	—	—
1960–61	Clinton Comets	EHL	8	2	1	3	10	—	—	—	—	—
1960–61	New York Rovers	EHL	44	8	13	21	5	—	—	—	—	—
1961–62	Indianapolis Chiefs	IHL	4	0	0	0	0	—	—	—	—	—
1961–62	Kimberley Dynamiters	WIHL	24	12	7	19	4	—	—	—	—	—
1963–64	Spokane Jets	WIHL	50	25	35	60	18	4	4	1	5	6
1964–65	Spokane Jets	WIHL	43	20	16	36	27	3	1	0	1	0
1965–66	Spokane Jets	WIHL	50	27	37	64	36	10	8	5	13	4
1966–67	Spokane Jets	WIHL	48	19	34	53	29	—	—	—	—	—
1967–68	Spokane Jets	WIHL	43	18	27	45	24	10	2	4	6	6
1968–69	Spokane Jets	WIHL	38	11	13	24	27	9	2	4	6	6
1968–69	Spokane Jets	Al-Cup	—	—	—	—	—	5	1	0	1	4
1969–70	Spokane Jets	WIHL	50	22	26	48	38	9	5	4	9	2
1969–70	Spokane Jets	Al-Cup	—	—	—	—	—	13	2	1	3	2
1970–71	Spokane Jets	WIHL	50	19	25	44	20	—	—	—	—	—
1971–72	Spokane Jets	WIHL	36	8	17	25	9	19	1	0	1	—
WIHL totals			432	181	237	418	232	64	23	18	41	24
NHL totals			2	0	0	0	2	—	—	—	—	—
