= Peter Morris (ice hockey) =

Canadian ice hockey player

- Born: June 29, 1955 (age 69); Edmonton, Alberta, Canada
- Height: 5 ft 8 in (173 cm)
- Weight: 165 lb (75 kg; 11 st 11 lb)
- Position: Left wing
- Shot: Left
- Played for: Edmonton Oilers (WHA)
- NHL draft: 103rd overall, 1975; Pittsburgh Penguins
- WHA draft: 21st overall, 1975; Edmonton Oilers
- Playing career: 1975–1985

Peter Morris (born June 29, 1955) is a Canadian former professional ice hockey winger who played in the World Hockey Association (WHA).

== Career ==
Drafted in the sixth round of the 1975 NHL Amateur Draft by the Pittsburgh Penguins, Morris opted to play in the WHA after being selected by the Edmonton Oilers in the second round of the 1975 WHA Amateur Draft. He played parts of two WHA seasons for the Oilers.

== Personal life ==
Morris's father, Frank Morris, played in the Canadian Football League.

== Career statistics ==
			Regular season					Playoffs
Season	Team	League	GP	G	A	Pts	PIM	GP	G	A	Pts	PIM
1972–73	Victoria Cougars	WCHL	1	0	0	0	0	—	—	—	—	—
1973–74	Victoria Cougars	WCHL	66	24	22	46	97	—	—	—	—	—
1974–75	Victoria Cougars	WCHL	70	43	72	115	173	12	4	6	10	35
1975–76	Edmonton Oilers	WHA	75	7	13	20	34	3	0	1	1	7
1975–76	Spokane Flyers	WIHL	2	0	0	0	2	—	—	—	—	—
1976–77	Springfield Indians	AHL	15	0	3	3	22	—	—	—	—	—
1976–77	Edmonton Oilers	WHA	3	0	0	0	2	—	—	—	—	—
1977–78	Spokane Flyers	WIHL	—	34	37	71	—	—	—	—	—	—
1978–79	Spokane Flyers	PHL	43	12	15	27	40	—	—	—	—	—
1979–80	Cranbrook Royals	WIHL	40	23	26	49	128	—	—	—	—	—
1980–81	Cranbrook Royals	WIHL	40	25	39	64	—	—	—	—	—	—
1981–82	Cranbrook Royals	WIHL	—	25	28	53	55	—	—	—	—	—
1982–83	Spokane Flyers	WIHL	48	30	40	70	65	—	—	—	—	—
1983–84	Spokane Flyers	WIHL	40	26	48	74	24	—	—	—	—	—
1984–85	Spokane Flyers	WIHL	31	31	37	68	24	—	—	—	—	—
WHA totals			78	7	13	20	36	3	0	1	1	7
WIHL totals			201	194	255	449	298	—	—	—	—	—
