= Dwight Carruthers =

Canadian ice hockey player

- Born: November 7, 1944 (age 80); Lashburn, Saskatchewan, Canada
- Height: 5 ft 10 in (178 cm)
- Weight: 180 lb (82 kg; 12 st 12 lb)
- Position: Defence
- Shot: Right
- Played for: Detroit Red Wings; Philadelphia Flyers
- Playing career: 1965–1976

Gordon Dwight Carruthers (born November 7, 1944) is a Canadian former professional ice hockey defenceman who played in two National Hockey League (NHL) games, one with the Detroit Red Wings in 1966 and the other with the Philadelphia Flyers in 1967. The rest of his career, which lasted from 1965 to 1976, was spent in various minor leagues.

== Career statistics ==
=== Regular season and playoffs ===
			Regular season					Playoffs
Season	Team	League	GP	G	A	Pts	PIM	GP	G	A	Pts	PIM
1962–63	Weyburn Red Wings	SJHL	54	5	15	20	78	13	1	2	3	15
1963–64	Weyburn Red Wings	SJHL	61	6	26	32	46	8	1	7	8	6
1964–65	Weyburn Red Wings	SJHL	48	9	33	42	103	15	4	11	15	20
1965–66	Memphis Wings	CHL	4	0	1	1	2	—	—	—	—	—
1965–66	Johnstown Jets	EHL	69	7	22	29	132	3	0	3	3	6
1965–66	Detroit Red Wings	NHL	1	0	0	0	0	—	—	—	—	—
1966–67	San Diego Gulls	WHL	29	2	3	5	10	—	—	—	—	—
1967–68	Seattle Totems	WHL	70	9	16	25	34	9	2	4	6	8
1967–68	Philadelphia Flyers	NHL	1	0	0	0	0	—	—	—	—	—
1968–69	Amarillo Wranglers	CHL	62	10	19	29	42	—	—	—	—	—
1968–69	Seattle Totems	WHL	1	0	1	1	0	4	0	0	0	2
1969–70	Seattle Totems	WHL	32	1	4	5	4	—	—	—	—	—
1969–70	Phoenix Roadrunners	WHL	24	1	4	5	20	—	—	—	—	—
1970–71	Spokane Jets	WIHL	—	18	37	55	—	—	—	—	—	—
1971–72	Spokane Jets	WIHL	—	—	—	—	—	—	—	—	—	—
1972–73	Spokane Jets	WIHL	—	—	—	—	—	—	—	—	—	—
1973–74	Spokane Flyers	WIHL	—	—	—	—	—	—	—	—	—	—
1974–75	Spokane Flyers	WIHL	48	12	37	49	60	—	—	—	—	—
1975–76	Spokane Flyers	WIHL	33	4	20	24	46	—	—	—	—	—
WHL totals			156	13	28	41	68	13	2	4	6	10
NHL totals			2	0	0	0	0	—	—	—	—	—
