= Geoff Powis =

Canadian ice hockey player

- Born: June 14, 1945 Winnipeg, Manitoba, Canada
- Died: November 28, 2001 (aged 56)
- Height: 6 ft 1 in (185 cm)
- Weight: 170 lb (77 kg; 12 st 2 lb)
- Position: Centre
- Shot: Left
- Played for: Chicago Black Hawks
- Playing career: 1966–1976

Geoff Charles "Jeff" Powis (June 14, 1945 – November 28, 2001) was a Canadian professional ice hockey player. Powis played ten seasons of professional ice hockey, mostly in the minor leagues from 1966 to 1976, as well as 2 games in the National Hockey League with the Chicago Black Hawks during the 1967–68 season. Powis' brother Lynn Powis was also a professional ice hockey player.

== Biography ==
Powis was born in Winnipeg, Manitoba. A graduate of the Saskatchewan Junior Hockey League team, Moose Jaw Canucks, Powis joined the St. Louis Braves of Central Professional Hockey League's in 1966–67 before making his National Hockey League debut the following year with the Chicago Black Hawks.

Powis spent the better part of the 1967–68 season with the CPHL's Dallas Black Hawks while playing in two games with Chicago before joining the International Hockey League's at Port Huron Flags in 1968–69.

Powis spent three seasons with Port Huron earning IHL First Team All-Star honors in 1969 before the franchise relocated to Toledo midway through the 1970–71 season. After moving to Toledo, Powis spent one more season with team before splitting the 1972–73 season with the Western Hockey League's Seattle Totems and Cranbrook Royals where he was a WIHL Second Team All-Star in 1973.

Powis died in November 2001.

== Career statistics ==
=== Regular season and playoffs ===
			Regular season					Playoffs
Season	Team	League	GP	G	A	Pts	PIM	GP	G	A	Pts	PIM
1962–63	Moose Jaw Canucks	SJHL	14	2	2	4	4	—	—	—	—	—
1963–64	Moose Jaw Canucks	SJHL	48	23	21	44	45	5	0	1	1	2
1964–65	Moose Jaw Canucks	SJHL	49	39	38	77	100	—	—	—	—	—
1965–66	Moose Jaw Canucks	SJHL	54	46	44	90	53	3	1	1	2	0
1966–67	St. Louis Braves	CPHL	57	8	15	23	23	—	—	—	—	—
1967–68	Chicago Black Hawks	NHL	2	0	0	0	0	—	—	—	—	—
1967–68	Dallas Black Hawks	CPHL	60	15	30	45	20	5	0	1	1	0
1968–69	Port Huron Flags	IHL	71	48	36	84	28	3	4	2	6	2
1969–70	Port Huron Flags	IHL	67	31	40	71	54	15	7	7	14	13
1970–71	Port Huron Flags/Toledo Hornets	IHL	52	21	22	43	30	—	—	—	—	—
1971–72	Toledo Hornets	IHL	27	5	15	20	6	—	—	—	—	—
1972–73	Seattle Totems	WHL	4	0	1	1	2	—	—	—	—	—
1972–73	Cranbrook Royals	WIHL	50	36	32	68	—	—	—	—	—	—
1973–74	Cranbrook Royals	WIHL	46	28	39	67	50	—	—	—	—	—
1974–75	Cranbrook Royals	WIHL	12	4	4	8	0	—	—	—	—	—
1975–76	Cranbrook Royals	WIHL	24	10	13	23	22	—	—	—	—	—
IHL totals			217	104	113	218	118	18	11	9	20	15
NHL totals			2	0	0	0	0	—	—	—	—	—
