= Mike Laughton =

Canadian ice hockey player

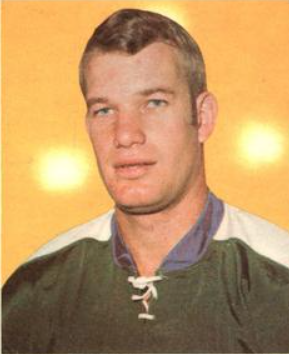
- Laughton in 1970 card
- Born: February 21, 1944 (age 82) Nelson, British Columbia, Canada
- Height: 6 ft 2 in (188 cm)
- Weight: 185 lb (84 kg; 13 st 3 lb)
- Position: Centre
- Shot: Left
- Played for: NHL; Oakland Seals; California Golden Seals; WHA; New York Raiders; New York Golden Blades; Jersey Knights; San Diego Mariners
- Playing career: 1964–1978

Michael Frederick Laughton (born February 21, 1944) is a Canadian former professional ice hockey player who played 189 games in the National Hockey League (NHL) and 203 games in the World Hockey Association (WHA). He played for the NHL Oakland Seals and California Golden Seals, as well as the WHA New York Raiders, New York Golden Blades, Jersey Knights, and San Diego Mariners.

Between his time in the NHL and the WHA, Laughton was sold to the Montreal Canadiens before the start of the 1971-72 season by the California Golden Seals. Not being able to make the team with an already stacked lineup, Laughton was sent down to the Nova Scotia Voyageurs of the American Hockey League and made team captain by head coach Al MacNeil. He led the team that included Larry Robinson and Yvon Lambert, future stars on the Canadiens, to the 1972 Calder Cup championship. He then signed in the WHA.

After being chosen in the 1975 intra-league draft by the WHA Calgary Cowboys and failing to come to terms on a contract, he returned to his hometown of Nelson to become player-coach of the Nelson Maple Leafs of the Western International Hockey League.

== Career statistics ==
=== Regular season and playoffs ===
			Regular season					Playoffs
Season	Team	League	GP	G	A	Pts	PIM	GP	G	A	Pts	PIM
1961–62	Nelson Knights	BCHL	—	—	—	—	—	—	—	—	—	—
1961–62	Nelson Maple Leafs	WIHL	1	0	0	0	2	—	—	—	—	—
1962–63	Nelson Knights	BCHL	—	—	—	—	—	—	—	—	—	—
1963–64	Nelson Maple Leafs	WIHL	48	19	27	46	24	3	1	0	1	0
1964–65	Nelson Maple Leafs	WIHL	48	35	21	56	44	10	5	8	13	18
1965–66	Nelson Maple Leafs	WIHL	45	36	34	70	72	—	—	—	—	—
1966–67	Victoria Maple Leafs	WHL	62	16	11	27	37	—	—	—	—	—
1967–68	Vancouver Canucks	WHL	23	8	5	13	10	—	—	—	—	—
1967–68	California/Oakland Seals	NHL	35	2	6	8	38	—	—	—	—	—
1968–69	Oakland Seals	NHL	53	20	23	43	22	7	2	3	5	0
1968–69	Cleveland Barons	AHL	13	2	6	8	6	—	—	—	—	—
1969–70	Oakland Seals	NHL	76	16	19	35	39	4	0	1	1	0
1970–71	California Golden Seals	NHL	25	1	0	1	2	—	—	—	—	—
1971–72	Nova Scotia Voyageurs	AHL	73	23	28	51	6	13	3	7	10	12
1972–73	New York Raiders	WHA	67	16	20	36	44	—	—	—	—	—
1973–74	New York Golden Blades/Jersey Knights	WHA	71	20	18	38	34	—	—	—	—	—
1974–75	Syracuse Blazers	NAHL	5	0	5	5	2	—	—	—	—	—
1974–75	San Diego Mariners	WHA	65	7	9	16	22	10	4	1	5	0
1976–77	Nelson Maple Leafs	WIHL	48	31	47	78	25	—	—	—	—	—
1977–78	Nelson Maple Leafs	WIHL	22	4	5	9	2	—	—	—	—	—
WHA totals			203	43	47	90	100	10	4	1	5	0
NHL totals			189	39	48	87	101	11	2	4	6	0
