= Gino Rozzini =

Canadian ice hockey player

- Born: October 24, 1916; Shawinigan, Quebec, Canada
- Died: April 18, 1996 (aged 79)
- Height: 5 ft 8 in (173 cm)
- Weight: 150 lb (68 kg; 10 st 10 lb)
- Position: Centre
- Shot: Left
- Played for: Boston Bruins
- Playing career: 1940–1959

Gino William Rozzini (October 24, 1916 — April 18, 1996) was a Canadian professional ice hockey centre who played 31 games in the National Hockey League with the Boston Bruins during the 1944–45 season. The rest of his career, which lasted from 1940 to 1959, was spent in various minor leagues. Rozzini scored his first NHL goal on November 12, 1944, in Boston's 5–5 tie versus the New York Rangers at Madison Square Garden.

== Career statistics ==
=== Regular season and playoffs ===
			Regular season					Playoffs
Season	Team	League	GP	G	A	Pts	PIM	GP	G	A	Pts	PIM
1936–37	Creighton Mines	GBHL	17	5	7	12	18	2	0	2	2	4
1937–38	Creighton Eagles	GBHL	15	8	5	13	22	4	0	0	0	8
1938–39	Creighton Eagles	GBHL	12	5	1	6	6	6	2	3	5	6
1940–41	St. Catharines Saints	OHA Sr	31	15	13	28	67	12	7	5	12	8
1941–42	Quebec Aces	QSHL	40	14	28	42	34	7	5	4	9	4
1941–42	Quebec Aces	Al-Cup	—	—	—	—	—	7	0	4	4	0
1942–43	Quebec Morton Aces	QSHL	34	12	21	33	41	4	1	2	3	0
1943–44	Quebec Aces	QSHL	13	6	5	11	10	6	5	0	5	10
1943–44	Quebec Aces	Al-Cup	—	—	—	—	—	9	7	9	16	6
1944–45	Boston Bruins	NHL	31	5	10	15	20	6	1	2	3	6
1944–45	Boston Olympics	EAHL	10	19	11	30	14	—	—	—	—	—
1945–46	Hershey Bears	AHL	56	31	40	71	63	3	0	2	2	4
1946–47	Tulsa Oilers	USHL	13	3	5	8	6	—	—	—	—	—
1946–47	Hershey Bears	AHL	37	5	10	15	14	11	3	2	5	0
1947–48	St. Paul Saints	USHL	65	22	60	82	79	—	—	—	—	—
1948–49	New Haven Ramblers	AHL	58	16	33	49	45	—	—	—	—	—
1949–50	St. Paul Saints	USHL	68	27	40	67	59	3	0	2	2	0
1950–51	Tacoma Rockets	PCHL	70	10	27	37	67	4	1	1	2	0
1951–52	Vancouver Canucks	PCHL	8	0	1	1	6	—	—	—	—	—
1951–52	Spokane Flyers	WIHL	52	23	41	64	100	4	1	2	3	5
1952–53	Spokane Flyers	WIHL	57	34	54	88	77	9	1	3	4	0
1952–53	Spokane Flyers	Al-Cup	—	—	—	—	—	7	1	4	5	6
1953–54	Spokane Flyers	WIHL	58	22	45	67	73	5	3	5	8	16
1954–55	Spokane Flyers	WIHL	24	9	12	21	31	—	—	—	—	—
1955–56	Spokane Flyers	WIHL	45	25	46	71	32	9	2	8	10	15
1955–56	Spokane Flyers	Al-Cup	—	—	—	—	—	6	0	3	3	4
1958–59	Rossland Warriors	WIHL	2	0	2	2	6	—	—	—	—	—
WIHL totals			238	113	200	313	319	27	7	18	25	36
NHL totals			31	5	10	15	20	6	1	2	3	6
