= Ted Hargreaves =

Canadian ice hockey player (1943–2005)

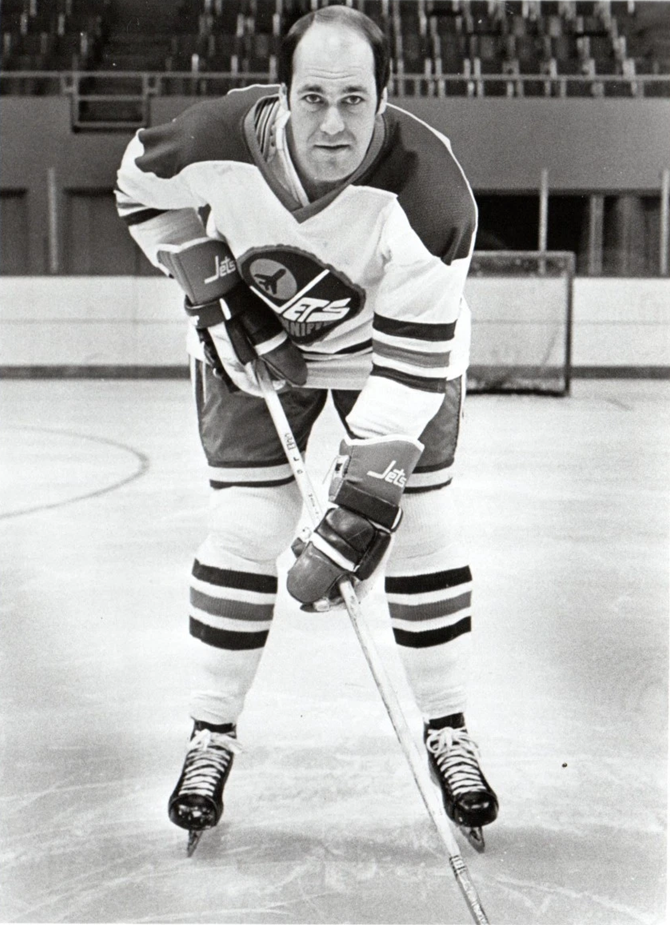
- Hargreaves in 1972 photo
- Born: November 4, 1943 Weyburn, Saskatchewan, Canada
- Died: November 3, 2005 (aged 61) Nelson, British Columbia, Canada
- Height: 5 ft 11 in (180 cm)
- Weight: 178 lb (81 kg; 12 st 10 lb)
- Position: Left wing
- Shot: Left
- Played for: Winnipeg Jets
- National team: Canada
- Playing career: 1969–1977

Olympic medal record

Men's Ice hockey
| Bronze medal – third place | 1968 Grenoble | Ice hockey |

Norman Edward Hargreaves (November 4, 1943 – November 3, 2005) was an amateur and professional hockey player, coach and teacher. He played for the bronze-medal-winning Canadian men's hockey team at the 1968 Winter Olympics in Grenoble, France.

Hargreaves played his minor hockey in Foam Lake, Saskatchewan, where he suited up for the senior Foam Lake Flyers. He also played junior hockey for the Melville Millionaires, and professionally for the Winnipeg Jets of the WHA. He finished his career in Nelson, British Columbia, where he played and coached the Nelson Maple Leafs of the Western International Hockey League. He taught high school and was instrumental in developing hockey programs in Nelson.

== Statistics ==
| | | | Regular season | | | | | Playoffs |
| Season | Team | League | GP | G | A | Pts | PIM | GP | G | A | Pts | PIM |
|---|---|---|---|---|---|---|---|---|---|---|---|---|
| 1969–70 | Tulsa Oilers | CHL | 62 | 23 | 27 | 50 | 27 | 6 | 1 | 1 | 2 | 6 |
| 1969–70 | Seattle Totems | WHL | — | — | — | — | — | 5 | 0 | 0 | 0 | 2 |
| 1970–71 | Tulsa Oilers | CHL | 47 | 3 | 10 | 13 | 11 | — | — | — | — | — |
| 1972–73 | Nelson Maple Leafs | WIHL | 47 | 18 | 33 | 51 | 43 | — | — | — | — | — |
| 1973–74 | Winnipeg Jets | WHA | 74 | 7 | 12 | 19 | 15 | 4 | 0 | 1 | 1 | 10 |
| 1974–75 | Nelson Maple Leafs | WIHL | 38 | 16 | 32 | 48 | 31 | — | — | — | — | — |
| 1975–76 | Nelson Maple Leafs | WIHL | 48 | 31 | 39 | 70 | 113 | — | — | — | — | — |
| 1976–77 | Nelson Maple Leafs | WIHL | ? | 4 | 5 | 9 | 8 | — | — | — | — | — |
| WHA totals | | | 74 | 7 | 12 | 19 | 15 | 4 | 0 | 1 | 1 | 10 |

| Year | Team | Event | GP | G | A | Pts | PIM |
|---|---|---|---|---|---|---|---|
| 1967–68 | Canadian National Team Intl |
| 1968–69 | Canadian National Team Intl |
| Totals |
