= Spence Tatchell =

Canadian ice hockey player

- Born: July 16, 1924 Lloydminster, SK, CAN
- Died: January 8, 2007 (aged 82)
- Height: 5 ft 10 in (178 cm)
- Weight: 165 lb (75 kg; 11 st 11 lb)
- Position: Defence
- Shot: Left
- Played for: New York Rangers
- Playing career: 1943–1954

Henry Spencer Tatchell (July 16, 1924 – January 8, 2007) was a Canadian professional ice hockey defenceman. He played one game in the National Hockey League with the New York Rangers during the 1942–43 season. The rest of his career, which lasted from 1943 to 1954, was spent in the minor leagues. Prior to turning professional, Tatchell played junior ice hockey in Winnipeg, Manitoba with both the Winnipeg Rangers and Winnipeg Monarchs. He was born in Lloydminster, Saskatchewan.

== Career highlights ==
During the 1942–43 season, he played in the Eastern Hockey League with the New York Rovers. It was during this season that Tatchell his only opportunity to play in the NHL as he was called up to play in one game with the New York Rangers, on February 20, 1943 against the Montreal Canadiens.

During the 1943–44 season Tatchell played with the Cornwallis Navy. On 12 January 1944, the New York Rangers traded to Tatchell to the Montreal Canadiens (along with Hub Macey and Nestor Lubeck) for Kilby MacDonald, but Tatchell spent the following year in military service and did not play in another NHL game.

Following World War II, Tatchell played with both the Nelson Maple Leafs and the Kimberley Dynamiters in the Western International Hockey League before retiring from hockey in 1954.

== Career statistics ==
=== Regular season and playoffs ===
			Regular season					Playoffs
Season	Team	League	GP	G	A	Pts	PIM	GP	G	A	Pts	PIM
1940–41	Winnipeg Rangers	MAHA	—	—	—	—	—	—	—	—	—	—
1941–42	Winnipeg Rangers	MJHL	1	0	0	0	2	—	—	—	—	—
1942–43	New York Rangers	NHL	1	0	0	0	0	—	—	—	—	—
1942–43	Winnipeg Monarchs	MJHL	7	9	2	11	8	—	—	—	—	—
1942–43	New York Rovers	EAHL	43	3	10	13	27	9	0	2	2	4
1943–44	Cornwallis Navy	NSDHL	5	4	6	10	—	—	—	—	—	—
1943–44	Cornwallis Navy	Al-Cup	—	—	—	—	—	10	1	8	9	9
1945–46	Nelson Maple Leafs	WKHL	20	7	3	10	10	8	2	2	4	9
1946–47	Nelson Maple Leafs	WIHL	34	16	14	30	8	7	2	1	3	0
1947–48	Nelson Maple Leafs	WIHL	35	7	13	20	6	3	0	1	1	2
1948–49	Nelson Maple Leafs	WIHL	42	9	13	22	6	5	2	3	5	0
1949–50	Nelson Maple Leafs	WIHL	1	0	0	0	0	—	—	—	—	—
1949–50	Kimberley Dynamiters	WIHL	33	15	18	33	9	5	2	4	6	2
1950–51	Kimberley Dynamiters	WIHL	32	10	20	30	8	7	1	2	3	—
1951–52	Kimberley Dynamiters	WIHL	35	15	18	33	8	2	1	1	2	0
1952–53	Kimberley Dynamiters	WIHL	30	6	12	18	6	4	0	2	2	0
1953–54	Kimberley Dynamiters	WIHL	18	1	9	10	8	—	—	—	—	—
WIHL totals			260	79	117	196	59	33	8	14	22	—
NHL totals			1	0	0	0	0	—	—	—	—	—

== See also ==
- List of players who played only one game in the NHL
