= Doug Horbul =

Canadian ice hockey player

- Born: July 27, 1952 (age 73) Nokomis, Saskatchewan, Canada
- Height: 5 ft 9 in (175 cm)
- Weight: 170 lb (77 kg; 12 st 2 lb)
- Position: Left
- Shot: Left
- Played for: Kansas City Scouts
- NHL draft: 63rd overall, 1972; New York Rangers
- Playing career: 1972–1977

Douglas George Horbul (born July 27, 1952) is a Canadian former ice hockey forward. Most of his career, which lasted from 1972 to 1977, was spent in the minor leagues, but he also played four games in the National Hockey League for the Kansas City Scouts during the 1974–75 season.

== Career statistics ==
=== Regular season and playoffs ===
			Regular season					Playoffs
Season	Team	League	GP	G	A	Pts	PIM	GP	G	A	Pts	PIM
1969–70	Saskatoon Blades	WCHL	60	22	30	52	22	7	1	1	2	2
1970–71	Saskatoon Blades	WCHL	40	17	18	35	20	—	—	—	—	—
1970–71	Calgary Centennials	WCHL	25	15	8	23	16	11	3	4	7	6
1971–72	Calgary Centennials	WCHL	68	39	32	71	38	13	9	8	17	6
1972–73	Providence Reds	AHL	10	1	4	5	2	—	—	—	—	—
1972–73	Omaha Knights	CHL	53	15	11	26	19	11	7	3	10	2
1973–74	Providence Reds	AHL	75	34	29	63	31	15	9	4	13	8
1974–75	Kansas City Scouts	NHL	4	1	0	1	2	—	—	—	—	—
1974–75	Baltimore Clippers	AHL	36	16	8	24	11	—	—	—	—	—
1974–75	Providence Reds	NHL	32	13	12	25	16	6	1	2	3	0
1975–76	Springfield Indians	AHL	25	2	1	3	8	—	—	—	—	—
1975–76	Baltimore Clippers	AHL	43	7	10	17	16	—	—	—	—	—
1976–77	Rhode Island Reds	AHL	16	3	4	7	2	—	—	—	—	—
1976–77	Fort Wayne Komets	IHL	45	14	21	35	14	9	4	6	10	0
1977–78	Trail Smoke Eaters	WIHL	45	12	29	41	8	—	—	—	—	—
1978–79	Trail Smoke Eaters	WIHL	—	—	—	—	—	—	—	—	—	—
1979–80	Trail Smoke Eaters	WIHL	—	6	11	17	8	—	—	—	—	—
1980–81	Trail Smoke Eaters	WIHL	10	1	3	4	0	—	—	—	—	—
AHL totals			237	76	68	144	86	21	10	6	16	8
NHL totals			4	1	0	1	2	—	—	—	—	—
