= Pete Vipond =

Canadian ice hockey player

- Born: December 8, 1949 (age 75); Brooklin, Ontario, Canada
- Height: 5 ft 10 in (178 cm)
- Weight: 175 lb (79 kg; 12 st 7 lb)
- Position: Left wing
- Shot: Left
- Played for: California Golden Seals
- NHL draft: 76th overall, 1969; Oakland Seals
- Playing career: 1969–1974

Peter John Vipond (born December 8, 1949) is a retired professional ice hockey winger who played 3 games in the National Hockey League for the California Golden Seals during the 1972–73 season. The rest of his career was spent in various minor leagues, and he retired in 1978.

== Career statistics ==
=== Regular season and playoffs ===
			Regular season					Playoffs
Season	Team	League	GP	G	A	Pts	PIM	GP	G	A	Pts	PIM
1967–68	Whitby Warriors	OHA-B	—	—	—	—	—	—	—	—	—	—
1967–68	Oshawa Generals	OHA	32	6	10	16	6	—	—	—	—	—
1968–69	Oshawa Generals	OHA	54	21	39	60	45	—	—	—	—	—
1969–70	Nelson Maple Leafs	WIHL	48	28	36	64	36	8	1	5	6	10
1969–70	Spokane Jets	WIHL	—	—	—	—	—	—	—	—	—	—
1970–71	Nelson Maple Leafs	WIHL	48	21	45	66	28	—	—	—	—	—
1971–72	Columbus Seals	IHL	66	23	39	62	24	—	—	—	—	—
1972–73	California Golden Seals	NHL	3	0	0	0	0	—	—	—	—	—
1972–73	Salt Lake Golden Eagles	WHL	66	33	24	57	17	9	1	3	4	2
1973–74	Tulsa Oilers	CHL	60	20	22	42	30	—	—	—	—	—
1974–75	Whitby Warriors	OHA Sr	37	19	18	37	9	—	—	—	—	—
1975–76	Whitby Warriors	OHA Sr	44	25	35	60	18	—	—	—	—	—
1976–77	Whitby Warriors	OHA Sr	34	22	26	48	21	—	—	—	—	—
1977–78	Whitby Warriors	OHA Sr	36	9	19	28	10	—	—	—	—	—
NHL totals			3	0	0	0	0	—	—	—	—	—
