= Murray Kennett =

Canadian ice hockey player (born 1952)

- Born: June 28, 1952 (age 74) Kamloops, British Columbia, Canada
- Height: 5 ft 10 in (178 cm)
- Weight: 174 lb (79 kg; 12 st 6 lb)
- Position: Defence
- Shot: Left
- Played for: Indianapolis Racers; Edmonton Oilers
- Playing career: 1972–1977

Murray Kennett (born June 28, 1952, in Kamloops, British Columbia) is a former Canadian professional ice hockey player who played in the World Hockey Association (WHA). He played for the Indianapolis Racers and Edmonton Oilers.

== Career statistics ==
			Regular season					Playoffs
Season	Team	League	GP	G	A	Pts	PIM	GP	G	A	Pts	PIM
1968–69	Victoria Cougars	BCJHL	—	—	—	—	—	—	—	—	—	—
1969–70	Victoria Cougars	BCJHL	48	9	17	26	32	—	—	—	—	—
1970–71	New Westminster Royals	BCJHL	—	—	—	—	—	—	—	—	—	—
1970–71	Brandon Wheat Kings	WCHL	3	1	1	2	16	—	—	—	—	—
1971–72	Victoria Cougars	WCHL	67	9	22	31	69	—	—	—	—	—
1972–73	San Diego Gulls	WHL-Sr.	70	3	12	15	67	6	0	0	0	4
1973–74	San Diego Gulls	WHL-Sr.	76	6	25	31	35	4	1	1	2	2
1974–75	Edmonton Oilers	WHA	50	4	14	18	17	—	—	—	—	—
1974–75	Indianapolis Racers	WHA	28	1	3	4	8	—	—	—	—	—
1974–75	Mohawk Valley Comets	NAHL-Sr.	1	0	0	0	0	—	—	—	—	—
1975–76	Edmonton Oilers	WHA	28	3	4	7	14	—	—	—	—	—
1975–76	Spokane Flyers	WIHL	27	9	29	38	34	—	—	—	—	—
1976–77	Spokane Flyers	WIHL	—	0	3	3	0	—	—	—	—	—
WHA totals			106	8	21	29	39	—	—	—	—	—
