= Ron Hutchinson (ice hockey) =

Canadian ice hockey player (1936–2021)

- Born: October 24, 1936 Flin Flon, Manitoba, Canada
- Died: July 10, 2021 (aged 84) Kelowna, British Columbia, Canada
- Height: 5 ft 10 in (178 cm)
- Weight: 165 lb (75 kg; 11 st 11 lb)
- Position: Centre
- Shot: Left
- Played for: New York Rangers
- Playing career: 1957–1970

Ronald Wayne Hutchinson (October 24, 1936 – July 10, 2021) was a Canadian professional ice hockey player who played nine games in the National Hockey League with the New York Rangers during the 1960–61 season. The rest of his career, which lasted from 1957 to 1970, was spent in the minor leagues.

== Career statistics ==
=== Regular season and playoffs ===
			Regular season					Playoffs
Season	Team	League	GP	G	A	Pts	PIM	GP	G	A	Pts	PIM
1954–55	Flin Flon Bombers	SJHL	16	1	6	7	0	—	—	—	—	—
1955–56	Flin Flon Bombers	SJHL	47	32	29	61	4	12	2	1	3	6
1955–56	Flin Flon Bombers	M-Cup	—	—	—	—	—	7	2	0	2	6
1956–57	Flin Flon Bombers	SJHL	55	28	54	82	10	10	7	12	19	2
1956–57	Flin Flon Bombers	M-Cup	—	—	—	—	—	17	4	13	17	11
1957–58	Vancouver Canucks	WHL	66	22	21	43	23	11	2	7	9	11
1958–59	Vancouver Canucks	WHL	70	15	33	48	21	9	2	4	6	9
1959–60	Vancouver Canucks	WHL	70	12	26	38	25	11	0	3	3	0
1960–61	New York Rangers	NHL	9	0	0	0	0	—	—	—	—	—
1960–61	Vancouver Canucks	WHL	53	11	5	16	10	9	0	1	1	0
1961–62	Vancouver Canucks	WHL	26	4	5	9	0	—	—	—	—	—
1961–62	Seattle Totems	WHL	44	14	11	25	14	2	0	0	0	)
1962–63	Vancouver Canucks	WHL	68	12	23	35	36	7	0	3	3	2
1963–64	Vancouver Canucks	WHL	70	10	19	29	8	—	—	—	—	—
1964–65	Seattle Totems	WHL	2	0	0	0	0	—	—	—	—	—
1964–65	Charlotte Checkers	EHL	59	20	30	50	33	3	1	1	2	0
1965–66	Vancouver Canucks	WHL	41	10	7	17	8	—	—	—	—	—
1966–67	Vancouver Canucks	WHL	13	0	1	1	4	—	—	—	—	—
1968–69	Cranbrook Royals	WIHL	46	10	33	43	32	—	—	—	—	—
1969–70	Cranbrook Royals	WIHL	35	13	21	34	6	5	0	1	1	2
WHL totals			523	110	151	261	149	49	4	18	22	22
NHL totals			9	0	0	0	0	—	—	—	—	—
