= 1986–87 WIHL season =

North American ice hockey season

1986–87 was the 40th season of the Western International Hockey League.

== Standings ==
- Elk Valley Blazers 31 20 9 2 42
- Nelson Maple Leafs 30 17 11 2 36
- Cranbrook Royals 30 15 15 0 30
- Kimberley Dynamiters 28 9 18 1 19
- Trail Smoke Eaters 21 6 14 1 13

Trail Smoke Eaters suspended operations on January 29, 1987.

== Playoffs ==
=== Semi finals ===
Best of 7

- Nelson Maple Leafs defeated Cranbrook Royals 4 games to 1 (4-0, 7-3, 8-6, 5-7, 10-1).
- Elk Valley Blazers defeated Kimberley Dynamiters 4 games to 0 (7-2, 16-1, E-K, 16-1).

=== Final ===
Best of 7

- Nelson Maple Leafs defeated Elk Valley Blazers 4 games to 2 (4-10, 6-4, 5-4 OT, 4-2, 5-4 OT, 4-2).

Nelson Maple Leafs win the Savage Cup and advanced to the 1986-87 Western Canada Allan Cup Playoffs.
