= 1985–86 WIHL season =

North American ice hockey season

1985–86 was the 39th season of the Western International Hockey League.

== Standings ==
- Nelson Maple Leafs 40 32 7 1 277 157 65
- Kimberley Dynamiters 40 25 14 1 234 182 51
- Elk Valley Blazers 40 20 19 1 256 248 41
- Cranbrook Royals 40 14 24 2 198 243 30
- Trail Smoke Eaters 40 6 33 1 177 312 13

== Playoffs ==
=== Semi finals ===
Best of 7

- Nelson Maple Leafs defeated Cranbrook Royals 4 games to 0 (9-0, 4-1, 12-3, 10-7).
- Elk Valley Blazers defeated Kimberley Dynamiters 4 games to 1 (9-4, 8-2, K-E, 7-6, 6-4).

=== Final ===
Best of 7

- Nelson Maple Leafs defeated Elk Valley Blazers 4 games to 2 (6-3, 4-10, 3-2, 8-1, 4-6, 5-4).

Nelson Maple Leafs win the Savage Cup and advanced to the 1985-86 Western Canada Allan Cup Playoffs.
