= Steve Witiuk =

Canadian ice hockey player (1929–2022)

- Born: January 8, 1929 Winnipeg, Manitoba, Canada
- Died: November 30, 2022 (aged 93) Spokane, Washington, U.S.
- Height: 5 ft 7 in (170 cm)
- Weight: 165 lb (75 kg; 11 st 11 lb)
- Position: Right wing
- Shot: Right
- Played for: Chicago Black Hawks
- Playing career: 1949–1969

Stephen Witiuk Sr. (January 8, 1929 – November 30, 2022) was a Canadian ice hockey player. He played 33 games in the National Hockey League with the Chicago Black Hawks during the 1951–52 season. The rest of his career, which lasted from 1949 to 1969, was mainly spent in the Western Hockey League. Witiuk died in Spokane, Washington on November 30, 2022, aged 93.

== Career statistics ==
=== Regular season and playoffs ===
			Regular season					Playoffs
Season	Team	League	GP	G	A	Pts	PIM	GP	G	A	Pts	PIM
1946–47	Winnipeg Rangers	MJHL	16	5	6	11	4	2	0	1	1	2
1947–48	Winnipeg Black Hawks	MJHL	22	12	5	17	10	—	—	—	—	—
1948–49	Winnipeg Black Hawks	MJHL	28	16	20	36	49	—	—	—	—	—
1949–50	Regina Capitals	WCSHL	8	0	1	1	0	—	—	—	—	—
1949–50	Kamloops Elks	OSHL	33	20	7	27	45	7	6	6	12	6
1949–50	Calgary Stampeders	Al-Cup	—	—	—	—	—	9	4	5	9	6
1950–51	Edmonton Flyers	WCSHL	48	22	23	45	71	8	2	2	4	10
1951–52	Chicago Black Hawks	NHL	33	3	8	11	14	—	—	—	—	—
1951–52	St. Louis Flyers	AHL	14	5	2	7	11	—	—	—	—	—
1952–53	Calgary Stampeders	WHL	60	21	20	41	66	1	0	0	0	0
1953–54	Calgary Stampeders	WHL	69	19	36	55	52	18	3	6	9	20
1954–55	Calgary Stampeders	WHL	60	26	37	63	61	9	5	2	7	14
1955–56	Calgary Stampeders	WHL	66	30	34	64	76	8	5	6	11	12
1956–57	Calgary Stampeders	WHL	47	17	18	35	55	—	—	—	—	—
1957–58	Calgary Stampeders	WHL	39	16	24	40	29	—	—	—	—	—
1957–58	Winnipeg Warriors	WHL	70	9	18	27	59	—	—	—	—	—
1958–59	Winnipeg Warriors	WHL	62	12	33	45	43	6	1	4	5	2
1959–60	Winnipeg Warriors	WHL	62	20	27	47	40	—	—	—	—	—
1960–61	Spokane Comets	WHL	67	28	24	52	79	4	0	1	1	4
1961–62	Spokane Comets	WHL	64	26	40	66	49	16	4	9	13	34
1962–63	Spokane Comets	WHL	66	21	33	54	96	—	—	—	—	—
1963–64	Denver Invaders	WHL	70	25	28	53	62	4	0	0	0	10
1964–65	Victoria Maple Leafs	WHL	56	11	21	32	37	11	2	2	4	16
1965–66	Victoria Maple Leafs	WHL	72	6	16	22	47	3	0	0	0	0
1966–67	Victoria Maple Leafs	WHL	59	5	10	15	34	—	—	—	—	—
1967–68	Spokane Jets	WIHL	41	20	34	54	57	8	7	9	16	13
1967–68	Spokane Jets	Al-Cup	—	—	—	—	—	4	0	1	1	9
1968–69	Spokane Jets	WIHL	40	6	18	24	30	6	2	1	3	2
WHL totals			945	294	423	717	840	87	20	32	52	114
NHL totals			33	3	8	11	14	—	—	—	—	—

== Awards and achievements ==
- WHL Championships (1954, 1966)
- Honoured Member of the Manitoba Hockey Hall of Fame
