= Ron Homenuke =

Canadian ice hockey player

- Born: January 5, 1952 (age 73); Hazelton, British Columbia, Canada
- Height: 5 ft 10 in (178 cm)
- Weight: 180 lb (82 kg; 12 st 12 lb)
- Position: Forward
- Played for: Vancouver Canucks
- NHL draft: 51st overall, 1972; Vancouver Canucks
- Playing career: 1972–1976

Ronald Wayne Homenuke (born January 5, 1952) is a Canadian former NHL player. He played in only one NHL game for the Vancouver Canucks, who had drafted him with the 51st pick in the 1972 Draft. He retired in 1976.

Homenuke now works as a missionary with street kids in the Philippines.

== Career statistics ==
			Regular season					Playoffs
Season	Team	League	GP	G	A	Pts	PIM	GP	G	A	Pts	PIM
1968–69	Calgary Centennials	WCHL	37	1	6	7	19	—	—	—	—	—
1969–70	Calgary Centennials	WCHL	56	17	14	31	54	16	5	2	7	35
1970–71	Calgary Centennials	WCHL	63	27	33	60	114	11	2	3	5	18
1971–72	Calgary Centennials	WCHL	68	33	62	95	57	13	6	5	11	14
1972–73	Vancouver Canucks	NHL	1	0	0	0	0	—	—	—	—	—
1972–73	Seattle Totems	WHL-Sr.	67	13	24	37	46	—	—	—	—	—
1973–74	Albuquerque Six Guns	CHL	47	12	15	27	39	—	—	—	—	—
1974–75	Seattle Totems	CHL	69	8	27	35	60	—	—	—	—	—
1975–76	Nelson Maple Leafs	WIHL	27	8	16	24	30	—	—	—	—	—
NHL totals			1	0	0	0	0	—	—	—	—	—
CHL totals			116	20	42	62	99	—	—	—	—	—

== See also ==
- List of players who played only one game in the NHL
