= Ken McAuley =

Canadian ice hockey player

- Born: January 9, 1921 Edmonton, Alberta, Canada
- Died: June 18, 1992 (aged 71)
- Height: 5 ft 10 in (178 cm)
- Weight: 190 lb (86 kg; 13 st 8 lb)
- Position: Goaltender
- Caught: Right
- Played for: New York Rangers
- Playing career: 1941–1950

Kenneth Leslie McAuley (January 9, 1921 – June 18, 1992) was a Canadian professional ice hockey goaltender who played 96 games in the National Hockey League with the New York Rangers during the 1943–44 and 1944–45 seasons.

== Playing career ==
McAuley played for the New York Rangers, who experienced a shortage of players due to the World War II draft. After serving a year in the military, McAuley was signed by the Rangers and played two seasons with the club. With a record of 17–64–15 he was not re-signed following the war. The Rangers opted to rotate Charlie Rayner and Jim Henry in net.

While playing in all but 20 minutes of the 1943-44 season, McAuley allowed 310 goals, setting a league record for worst goals against average (6.24) that has stood ever since. The closest any starting goaltender has come to breaking this record is Ron Low, who recorded a 5.45 GAA as the Washington Capitals starting goaltender in the 1975–76 season.

In 1945 he married Women's Baseball player, a thirdbase for the Rockford Peaches, Mildred Warwick, and decided to settle down with his wife in Edmonton, Alberta.

== Career statistics ==
=== Regular season and playoffs ===
Bold indicates led league
Bold italics indicate NHL record

			Regular season								Playoffs
Season	Team	League	GP	W	L	T	Min	GA	SO	GAA	GP	W	L	T	Min	GA	SO	GAA
1938–39	Edmonton Maple Leafs	EJrHL	11	—	—	—	660	38	0	3.45	—	—	—	—	—	—	—	—
1939–40	Edmonton Maple Leafs	EJrHL	—	—	—	—	—	—	—	—	—	—	—	—	—	—	—	—
1940–41	Edmonton Maple Leafs	EJrHL	—	—	—	—	—	—	—	—	—	—	—	—	—	—	—	—
1941–42	Regina Rangers	SSHL	32	11	16	5	1970	136	2	4.14	3	0	3	0	180	15	0	5.00
1943–44	New York Rangers	NHL	**50**	6	**39**	5	2980	**310**	0	6.24	—	—	—	—	—	—	—	—
1944–45	New York Rangers	NHL	46	11	25	**10**	2760	**227**	1	4.93	—	—	—	—	—	—	—	—
1945–46	Edmonton Flyers	WCSHL	36	24	10	2	2200	130	0	3.55	8	4	4	—	490	31	0	3.80
1946–47	Edmonton Flyers	WCSHL	40	22	16	2	2460	139	1	3.39	1	0	1	—	60	5	0	5.00
1947–48	Saskatoon Quakers	WCSHL	48	10	36	2	2900	234	0	4.84	—	—	—	—	—	—	—	—
1948–49	Saskatoon Quakers	WCSHL	6	—	—	—	353	42	0	7.14	—	—	—	—	—	—	—	—
1949–50	Kimberley Dynamiters	WIHL	1	1	0	0	60	2	0	2.00	—	—	—	—	—	—	—	—
NHL totals			96	17	64	15	5740	537	1	5.61	—	—	—	—	—	—	—	—
