= Johnny Harms =

Canadian ice hockey player

- Born: April 29, 1925 Saskatoon, Saskatchewan, Canada
- Died: January 5, 2003 (aged 77) Vernon, British Columbia, Canada
- Height: 5 ft 8 in (173 cm)
- Weight: 180 lb (82 kg; 12 st 12 lb)
- Position: Right wing
- Shot: Right
- Played for: Chicago Black Hawks
- Playing career: 1943–1956

John Harms (April 29, 1925 – January 5, 2003) was a Canadian ice hockey player of Cree heritage who played 44 games in the National Hockey League (NHL) with the Chicago Black Hawks during the 1943–44 and 1944–45 seasons. The rest of his career lasted from 1943 to 1961 and was spent in various minor leagues. He died at age 78 from a burst esophagus.

== Early life ==
Harms was born in Saskatoon, Saskatchewan, at Saskatoon City Hospital, to Helen Laird (née Hauback) and George Laird, a farmer, both from Marquis, Saskatchewan. When he was 10 days old, he was adopted by a Dutch-speaking couple, John and Helen Harms. He attended elementary school and later studied art in Saskatoon before playing hockey. He lived with his adoptive family until the age of 18, when he was drafted into the NHL.

== Entry into the NHL ==
During the 1942-43 season, at the age of 17, he played for the Saskatoon Quakers and helped the team win the Memorial Cup with 4 goals and 2 assists. In the 1943-44 season, he signed with the Chicago Black Hawks, where he played 4 games in the playoffs against the Toronto Maple Leafs. He was sent to the Hershey Bears of the American Hockey League for the last part of the 1943-44 season, and in 1944, he was back in the NHL playing 43 games in the regular season with the Black Hawks, scoring 5 goals and 5 assists. Of the 26 players on the Black Hawks roster in 1944, 19 were Canadians.

== Post NHL ==
Between 1945 and 1950, he played with the Kansas City Pla-Mors, which is where he met his future wife Donna Bell Spencer, with whom he had 3 children: John, Michael, and Catherine. He worked as a lineman and an electrician for the British Columbia Power and Hydro Authority for 25 years between 1959 and 1984, and during that time brought hydro to many remote regions of the Okanagan and Shuswap regions of British Columbia.

He was recruited to play for several Canadian teams after 1949, playing for the Regina Capitals (1950-51), the Nelson Maple Leafs (1950-52), the Vernon Canadians (1951-61), and one year (1959-60) with the Kelowna Packers. In 1956, his team won the Allan Cup, the trophy awarded annually to the senior ice hockey champions of Canada. The reigning Allan Cup champion was usually chosen to represent Canada in ice hockey at the Olympic Games or the Ice Hockey World Championships.

== Career statistics ==
=== Regular season and playoffs ===
			Regular season					Playoffs
Season	Team	League	GP	G	A	Pts	PIM	GP	G	A	Pts	PIM
1942–43	Saskatoon Quakers	NSJHL	8	4	3	7	28	3	2	3	5	6
1942–43	Saskatoon Quakers	M-Cup	—	—	—	—	—	8	4	2	6	12
1943–44	Chicago Black Hawks	NHL	1	0	0	0	0	4	3	0	3	2
1943–44	Hershey Bears	AHL	52	10	21	31	35	7	2	1	3	6
1944–45	Chicago Black Hawks	NHL	43	5	5	10	21	—	—	—	—	—
1944–45	Providence Reds	AHL	3	0	4	4	0	—	—	—	—	—
1945–46	Kansas City Pla-Mors	USHL	45	26	25	51	73	12	2	2	4	14
1946–47	Kansas City Pla-Mors	USHL	60	21	34	55	80	12	3	9	12	9
1947–48	Kansas City Pla-Mors	USHL	66	29	40	69	56	7	2	6	8	0
1948–49	Kansas City Pla-Mors	USHL	57	19	48	67	64	2	0	0	0	0
1949–50	Kansas City Pla-Mors	USHL	64	15	27	42	38	3	2	0	2	2
1950–51	Regina Capitals	WCSHL	21	0	7	7	12	—	—	—	—	—
1950–51	Nelson Maple Leafs	WIHL	25	8	12	20	99	4	1	2	3	12
1951–52	Nelson Maple Leafs	WIHL	37	14	30	44	80	3	2	2	4	5
1951–52	Vernon Canadians	OSHL	1	0	0	0	0	—	—	—	—	—
1952–53	Vernon Canadians	OSHL	52	30	37	60	110	5	2	2	4	20
1953–54	Vernon Canadians	OSHL	55	27	23	50	113	5	1	3	4	4
1954–55	Vernon Canadians	OSHL	53	17	23	40	52	5	2	4	6	2
1954–55	Vernon Canadians	Al-Cup	—	—	—	—	—	17	5	13	18	16
1955–56	Vernon Canadians	OSHL	39	16	25	41	58	8	4	3	7	32
1955–56	Vernon Canadians	Al-Cup	—	—	—	—	—	13	5	16	21	10
1956–57	Vernon Canadians	OSHL	49	20	38	58	87	12	3	6	9	26
1957–58	Vernon Canadians	OSHL	37	9	11	20	62	8	0	4	4	16
1958–59	Vernon Canadians	OSHL	—	—	—	—	—	2	0	1	1	2
1959–60	Kelowna Packers	Al-Cup	—	—	—	—	—	6	1	3	4	2
1960–61	Vernon Canadians	OSHL	39	9	34	43	131	5	1	6	7	6
OSHL totals			325	128	191	319	613	50	13	29	42	108
NHL totals			44	5	5	10	21	4	3	0	3	2
