= Bob Murdoch (ice hockey, born 1954) =

Canadian ice hockey player

- Born: January 29, 1954 (age 72) Cranbrook, British Columbia, Canada
- Height: 5 ft 11 in (180 cm)
- Weight: 191 lb (87 kg; 13 st 9 lb)
- Position: Right wing
- Shot: Right
- Played for: California Golden Seals; Cleveland Barons; St. Louis Blues
- NHL draft: Undrafted
- Playing career: 1972–1980

Robert Lovell "Bob" Murdoch (born January 29, 1954) is a Canadian former professional ice hockey winger.

== Career ==
Murdoch played 260 games in the National Hockey League (NHL) with the California Golden Seals, Cleveland Barons, and St. Louis Blues. Murdoch is the brother of Don Murdoch. he also coached the Cranbrook colts for a year.

== Career statistics ==
			Regular season					Playoffs
Season	Team	League	GP	G	A	Pts	PIM	GP	G	A	Pts	PIM
1972–73	Edmonton Oil Kings	WCHL	1	0	0	0	0	—	—	—	—	—
1973–74	Cranbrook Royals	WIHL	48	37	24	61	—	—	—	—	—	—
1974–75	Salt Lake Golden Eagles	CHL	76	33	30	63	66	11	6	6	12	8
1975–76	California Golden Seals	NHL	78	22	27	49	53	—	—	—	—	—
1976–77	Cleveland Barons	NHL	57	23	19	42	30	—	—	—	—	—
1977–78	Cleveland Barons	NHL	71	14	26	40	27	—	—	—	—	—
1978–79	St. Louis Blues	NHL	54	13	13	26	17	—	—	—	—	—
1978–79	Salt Lake Golden Eagles	CHL	6	1	1	2	0	—	—	—	—	—
1979–80	Salt Lake Golden Eagles	CHL	29	8	14	22	23	—	—	—	—	—
1979–80	Adirondack Red Wings	AHL	21	5	9	14	19	—	—	—	—	—
NHL totals			260	72	85	157	127	—	—	—	—	—
