= 1984–85 WIHL season =

North American ice hockey season

1984–85 was the 38th season of the Western International Hockey League.

The Spokane Chiefs were named the 1984-85 Champions of the WIHL and advanced to play in the 1984-85 Western Canada Allan Cup Playoffs.

== Standings ==
- Spokane Chiefs 40 34 4 2 279 130 70
- Nelson Maple Leafs 40 22 16 2 217 166 46
- Elk Valley Blazers 40 17 20 3 176 196 37
- Kimberley Dynamiters 40 10 26 4 158 250 24
- Cranbrook Royals 40 11 28 1 182 267 23

== Playoffs ==
=== Semi-finals ===
On Tuesday March 12, 1985, the Spokane Chiefs completed their four-game sweep of the hometown Kimberly Dynamites with a final score of 15-5. Gordie McKay scored four goals, with Bob Scurfield, Bruce Cullen and Gary Harpell scoring two goals apiece for the regular season champion Chiefs. The Chiefs won the best-of-seven Savage Cup semi-final series with scores of 8-1, 6-2, 11-2 and 15-5.

In the other series, the Nelson Maple Leafs defeated the Elk Valley Blazers four games to three in a series that went the full seven games.

The Spokane Chiefs and the Nelson Maple Leafs advanced to the Savage Cup final for the Western International Hockey League playoff championship and the right to compete in the Patton Cup playoffs for the Western Canada senior amateur title.

=== Final ===
In the best-of-seven final, the Spokane Chiefs defeated Nelson Maple Leafs four games to one to win the Savage Cup. The Spokane Chiefs advanced to the 1984-85 Western Canada Allan Cup Playoffs.
