= 1971–72 WIHL season =

North American ice hockey season

1971–72 was the 25th season of the Western International Hockey League.

== Standings ==
- Spokane Jets 48 33 13 2 235 163 68
- Nelson Maple Leafs 48 21 22 5 213 191 47
- Kimberley Dynamiters 48 20 25 3 172 184 43
- Cranbrook Royals 48 20 26 2 173 192 42
- Trail Smoke Eaters 48 18 26 4 162 225 40

== Playoffs ==
In the "best of 7" semi-finals:

- Spokane Jets defeated Cranbrook Royals 4 games to 3 (4-2, 6-3, 7-4, 4-7, 5-1*, 2-4, 4-0)
- Nelson Maple Leafs defeated Kimberley Dynamiters 4 games to 2 (2-7, 6-2, 4-1, 3-6, 5-2, 7-2)

The Cranbrook Royals successfully protested against their loss in the 5th game in the series, resulting in the game being awarded to Cranbrook.

In the "best of 7" final series, the Spokane Jets defeated Nelson Maple Leafs 4 games to 1 (5-3, 5-4, 5-2, 2-3, 5-4). The Spokane Jets advanced to the 1971-72 Western Canada Allan Cup Playoffs.
