= 1987–88 WIHL season =

North American ice hockey season

1987–88 was the 41st and final season of the Western International Hockey League.

== Standings ==
- Cranbrook Royals (14-7-1-29)
- Elk Valley Blazers (7-14-1-15)
- Kimberley Dynamiters (7-15-0-14)

Elk Valley Blazers won the playoffs and were awarded the Savage Cup.
