= 1978–79 WIHL season =

North American ice hockey season

1978–79 was the 32nd season of the Western International Hockey League.

The schedule included playing games against University of British Columbia, University of Calgary, and the Spokane Flyers and Phoenix Roadrunners of the Pacific Hockey League.

- The Nelson Maple Leafs suspended operations on December 21, 1978.
- The Calgary Stampeders suspended operations on January 7, 1979.

== Standings ==
- Kimberley Dynamiters 51 37 12 2 321 211 76
- Trail Smoke Eaters 54 23 28 1 243 147 49
- Cranbrook Royals 52 22 29 1 259 259 45
- Calgary Stampeders 25 12 11 2 117 122 26
- Nelson Maple Leafs 22 5 17 0 82 155 10

== Playoffs ==
=== Semi final ===
In a "best of 5" series, the Trail Smoke Eaters defeated Cranbrook Royals 3 games to 0 (5-3, 8-2, 4-3 OT)

=== Final ===
In a "best of 7" series, the Trail Smoke Eaters defeated Kimberley Dynamiters 4 games to 3 (5-6 2OT, X-X, 2-8, 8-4, X-X, 4-3 2OT, 6-2).

The Trail Smoke Eaters advanced to the 1978-79 Western Canada Allan Cup Playoffs.
