= 1981–82 WIHL season =

North American ice hockey season

1981–82 was the 35th season of the Western International Hockey League.

== Standings ==
- Cranbrook Royals 44 29 14 1 59
- Trail Smoke Eaters 44 27 16 1 55
- Kimberley Dynamiters 44 21 20 3 45
- Nelson Maple Leafs 44 17 26 1 35
- Elk Valley Blazers 44 13 31 0 26

== Playoffs ==
=== Semi finals ===
Best of 7

- Cranbrook Royals defeated Nelson Maple Leafs 4 games to 2 (2-6, 2-4, 5-3, 4-2, 6-3, 3-1)
- Kimberley Dynamiters defeated Trail Smoke Eaters 4 games to 2 (8-6, 7-2, 3-10, 2-5, 5-4, 5-1)

=== Final ===
In the "Best of 7" final series, Cranbrook Royals defeated Kimberley Dynamiters 4 games to 1 (8-2, 6-7 OT, 6-3, 8-5, 8-3) to advance to the 1981-82 Western Canada Allan Cup Playoffs.
