= 1983–84 WIHL season =

North American ice hockey season

1983–84 was the 37th season of the Western International Hockey League.

== Standings ==
	GP	W	L	T	Pts
Spokane Chiefs	40	30	7	3	63
Nelson Maple Leafs	40	26	12	2	54
Trail Smoke Eaters	40	23	15	2	48
Elk Valley Blazers	40	12	26	2	26
Kimberley Dynamiters	40	12	27	1	25
Cranbrook Royals	40	12	28	0	24

== Playoffs ==
=== Semi final ===
Best of 7

- Nelson Maple Leafs defeated Trail Smoke Eaters 4 games to 1 (4-3 OT, 3-4, 4-2, 6-4, 3-2)

=== Final ===
Best of 7

- Spokane Chiefs defeated Nelson Maple Leafs 4 games to 2

Spokane Chiefs advanced to the 1983-84 Western Canada Allan Cup Playoffs.
