= 1966–67 WIHL season =

North American ice hockey season

1966–67 was the 20th season of the Western International Hockey League.

== Standings ==
- Nelson Maple Leafs 50 39 10 1 272 148 79
- Spokane Jets 50 33 15 2 285 186 68
- Kimberley Dynamiters 50 24 24 2 222 222 50
- Trail Smoke Eaters 50 20 26 4 222 241 44
- Rossland Warriors 50 18 29 3 201 264 39
- Cranbrook Royals 50 9 39 2 183 342 20

== Playoffs ==
=== Semi finals (best of 7) ===
- Nelson defeated Trail 4 games to 0 (11-2, 6-5 OT, 4–2, 6–2)
- Spokane defeated Kimberley 4 games to 2 (4-6, 5–4, 4-3 2OT, 2–3, 2–0, 4–3)

=== Final (best of 7) ===
- Nelson defeated Spokane 4 games to 1 (10-2, 0–5, 4–1, 5–4, 3-2 OT)

The Nelson Maple Leafs advanced to the 1966-67 Western Canada Allan Cup Playoffs.
