= Garth Rizzuto =

Canadian ice hockey player (born 1947)

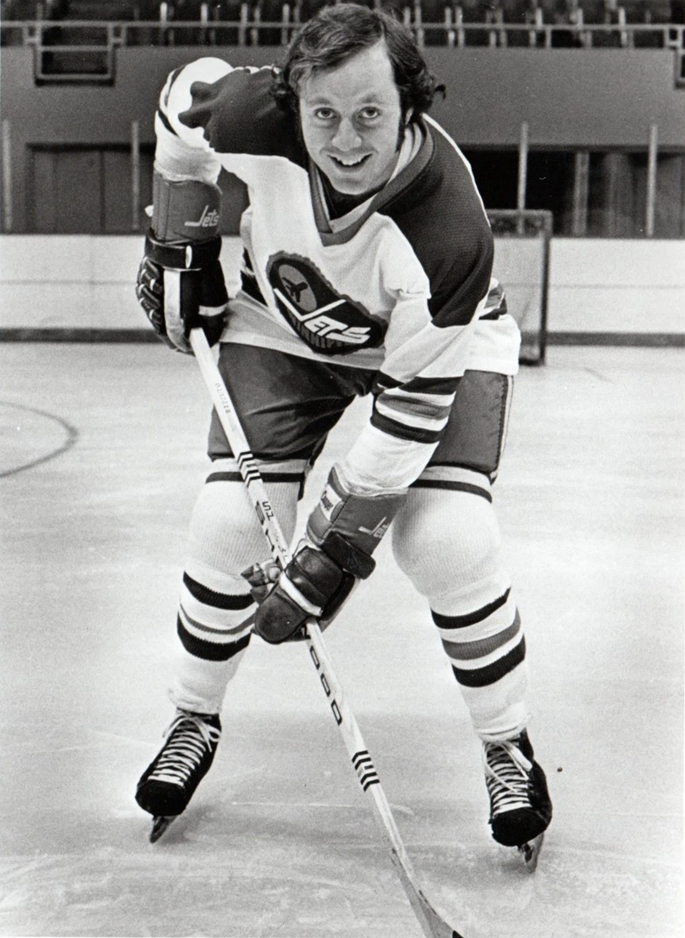
- Rizzuto in 1973 photo
- Born: September 11, 1947 (age 78) Trail, British Columbia, Canada
- Height: 5 ft 10 in (178 cm)
- Weight: 185 lb (84 kg; 13 st 3 lb)
- Position: Centre
- Shot: Left
- Played for: Vancouver Canucks; Winnipeg Jets (WHA)
- Playing career: 1967–1974

Garth Alexander Rizzuto (born September 11, 1947) is a Canadian former professional ice hockey centre who played in the National Hockey League (NHL) and the World Hockey Association (WHA) during the 1970s. He played 37 games for the Vancouver Canucks of the NHL in 1970–71 and 110 games for the Winnipeg Jets of the WHA between 1972 and 1974, as well as several years in the minor CHL and American Hockey League. He retired in 1974.

== Playing career ==
A hard-working center, Rizzuto came up through the system of the Chicago Blackhawks, turning pro in 1967. He spent three solid years in the minors with the Dallas Black Hawks but never saw an NHL game in Chicago. In the 1970 NHL Expansion Draft he was claimed by the Vancouver Canucks.

Rizzuto spent most of the 1970–71 season on the Canucks' roster as a utility player, recording 3 goals and 4 assists for 7 points in 37 games. He is the first player born and trained in British Columbia to suit up with the Canucks and score for the team. For the 1971–72 season, he was sent to the minors.

For the 1972–73 season, Rizzuto signed on with the Winnipeg Jets of the rival upstart World Hockey Association. He was his best professional season, recording 10 goals and 20 points, helping a team led by Bobby Hull to the Avco Cup finals. In 1973–74, however, his role would be reduced and he finished with 3 goals and 7 points in 41 games. He retired after a brief stint as a player-coach of the Nelson Maple Leafs of the Western International Hockey League at the start of the 1974–75 season.

== Post-playing career ==
He now resides in Langley, British Columbia as the owner of Rizzuto Construction and is a boxing trainer.

== Career statistics ==
=== Regular season and playoffs ===
			Regular season					Playoffs
Season	Team	League	GP	G	A	Pts	PIM	GP	G	A	Pts	PIM
1965–66	Moose Jaw Canucks	SJHL	22	5	11	16	16	5	0	2	2	14
1966–67	Moose Jaw Canucks	SJHL	55	24	31	55	133	14	7	16	23	59
1967–68	Dallas Black Hawks	CHL	47	5	14	19	17	5	2	1	3	4
1968–69	Dallas Black Hawks	CHL	72	30	29	59	71	11	2	4	6	10
1969–70	Dallas Black Hawks	CHL	72	20	42	62	55	—	—	—	—	—
1970–71	Vancouver Canucks	NHL	37	3	4	7	16	—	—	—	—	—
1970–71	Rochester Americans	AHL	22	8	12	20	56	—	—	—	—	—
1971–72	Rochester Americans	AHL	36	6	8	14	11	—	—	—	—	—
1971–72	Seattle Totems	WHL	23	4	15	19	36	—	—	—	—	—
1972–73	Winnipeg Jets	WHA	61	10	10	20	32	14	0	1	1	14
1973–74	Winnipeg Jets	WHA	41	3	4	7	8	—	—	—	—	—
1974–75	Nelson Maple Leafs	WIHL	6	4	7	11	34	—	—	—	—	—
WHA totals			102	13	14	27	40	14	0	1	1	14
NHL totals			37	3	4	7	16	—	—	—	—	—
