= 1979–80 WIHL season =

North American ice hockey season

1979–80 was the 33rd season of the Western International Hockey League.

== Standings ==
- Spokane Flyers 55 35 18 2 290 201 .636
- Trail Smoke Eaters 51 30 18 3 284 206 .617
- Cranbrook Royals 51 30 21 0 292 238 .588
- Kimberley Dynamiters 51 28 23 0 260 256 .551
- Elk Valley Blazers 51 15 33 3 183 298 .313
- Nelson Maple Leafs 51 11 37 3 200 287 .212

== Playoffs ==
=== Semi finals ===
Best of 7

- Cranbrook Royals defeated Trail Smoke Eaters 4 games to 2 (3-6, 8-6, 0-8, 7-3, 6-4, 9-4)
- Spokane Flyers defeated Kimberley Dynamiters 4 games to 1 (4-0, 5-4, 3-4 OT, 4-2, 4-3)

=== Final ===
In the "best of 7" final, Spokane Flyers defeated Cranbrook Royals 4 games to 2 (6-5 2OT, 3-7, 8-1, 2-7, 7-2, 6-1) to advanced to the 1979-80 British Columbia Senior Playoffs.
