= Glen Smith (ice hockey) =

Canadian ice hockey player

- Born: March 19, 1931; Lucky Lake, Saskatchewan, Canada
- Died: March 30, 1999 (aged 68); Saskatchewan, Canada
- Height: 5 ft 8 in (173 cm)
- Weight: 155 lb (70 kg; 11 st 1 lb)
- Position: Right Wing
- Shot: Right
- Played for: Chicago Black Hawks
- Playing career: 1950–1966

Raymond Glen Smith (March 19, 1931 – March 30, 1999) was a Canadian ice hockey player who played two games in the National Hockey League with the Chicago Black Hawks during the 1950–51 season. the rest of his career, which lasted from 1950 to 1966, was mainly spent in the Saskatchewan Senior Hockey League. He is the most recent player listed by the NHL (1950–51) to wear the number 1 while not being a goalie.

== Career statistics ==
=== Regular season and playoffs ===
			Regular season					Playoffs
Season	Team	League	GP	G	A	Pts	PIM	GP	G	A	Pts	PIM
1948–49	Moose Jaw Canucks	WCJHL	26	7	1	8	10	9	4	2	6	11
1948–49	Moose Jaw Canucks	M-Cup	—	—	—	—	—	6	0	1	1	11
1949–50	Moose Jaw Canucks	WCJHL	33	20	22	42	28	4	1	0	1	0
1950–51	Chicago Black Hawks	NHL	2	0	0	0	0	—	—	—	—	—
1950–51	Milwaukee Sea Gulls	USHL	64	10	14	24	31	—	—	—	—	—
1951–52	Nelson Maple Leafs	WIHL	42	16	15	31	19	9	4	3	7	2
1952–53	Nelson Maple Leafs	WIHL	39	13	8	21	10	5	2	0	2	2
1953–54	Moose Jaw Millers	SSHL	39	25	37	62	15	7	1	4	5	2
1953–54	Moose Jaw Millers	Al-Cup	—	—	—	—	—	8	1	0	1	0
1954–55	Fort Wayne Komets	IHL	24	4	6	10	4	—	—	—	—	—
1956–57	Gravelbourg Hornets	SIHA	—	—	—	—	—	—	—	—	—	—
1957–58	Gravelbourg Hornets	SIHA	—	—	—	—	—	—	—	—	—	—
1958–59	Moose Jaw Pla-Mors	SSHL	10	5	6	11	2	—	—	—	—	—
1959–60	Moose Jaw Pla-Mors	SSHL	25	18	9	27	35	5	4	8	12	2
1960–61	Moose Jaw Pla-Mors	SSHL	32	12	22	34	10	8	4	0	4	2
1961–62	Moose Jaw Pla-Mors	SSHL	30	9	24	33	8	6	2	0	2	2
1962–63	Moose Jaw Pla-Mors	SSHL	31	13	18	31	17	—	—	—	—	—
1963–64	Moose Jaw Pla-Mors	SSHL	31	21	18	39	10	—	—	—	—	—
1964–65	Moose Jaw Pla-Mors	SSHL	9	0	2	2	2	—	—	—	—	—
1965–66	Moose Jaw Pla-Mors	SSHL	5	0	2	2	2	—	—	—	—	—
SSHL totals			212	103	138	241	101	26	11	12	23	8
NHL totals			2	0	0	0	0	—	—	—	—	—
