= 1954–55 WIHL season =

Sports Season

1954–55 was the ninth season of the Western International Hockey League.

== Season recap ==
The Kimberley Dynamiters defeated the powerful Nelson Maple Leafs four games to one in a best-of-seven series for the 1954-55 WIHL championship. The Dynamiters went on to play the Vernon Canadians in the Savage Cup playdowns, and were trounced four games to one. It was a frustrating season for the Dynamiters.

FIRST—they lost the league title to the Nelson Maple Leafs in the final game of the season, 4-3 at Nelson, after leading the pack most of the entire season.

SECOND--Buzz Mellor lost the scoring championship to Nelson's Joe Bell by less than one point, with the percentage basis in force that year. Joe Bell picked up an assist on the Maple Leaf final goal of the regulation season, by just being on the ice. He no more deserved an assist on the goal than the timekeeper, but nevertheless it cost Buzz Mellor the scoring crown. Claude Bell of the Kimberley Dynamiters enjoyed his best season ever, finishing one point behind teammate Buzz Mellor in the scoring race. He paced the league in the goal department that term, with 30 markers in only 34 games, while most of the other teams played a 44 game schedule.

THIRD—the Dynamiters ace goalie, Earl Betker, lost out to Nelson's Ray Mikulan for the goaltending award, by a slim margin of 3.97 to 3.95 average. One consolation: Earl Betker was picked the WIHL All-Star netminder that season.

FOURTH—Earl Betker suffered a severe back injury when he came out of his net to block Fritz Koehle's shot in the second game of the playoffs in Nelson. The courageous Dynamiter goalie, after being carried from the ice, returned to play the ten minutes of regulation time, and held the Dynamiters in the game in overtime, with playing coach Norm Larsen scoring the winner with 12 seconds remaining in the first overtime. It wasn't necessary to dress a spare goaltender in those days, and Betker disobeyed the doctor's advice, and went out and made many brilliant saves, despite the fact he was labouring under terrific pain. He failed to see further action for the Dynamiters that season, with Kimberley securing the services of Spokane Flyers' Jerry Fodey.

Just to show you how desperate the Nelson Maple Leafs wanted to win was when they launched a protest to the WIHL, on the grounds that the injured Betker took approximately 15 minutes to return to action. The protest was disallowed after the league executive conferred with the British Columbia Amateur Hockey Association (BCAHA), and the bad publicity the Maple Leafs received didn't help their cause. The Maple Leaf players were not in favour of the protest.

Jerry Fodey proved himself a real sportsman by coming to the Dynamiters rescue. When contacted by the Dynamiters executive, he never even asked about money, but caught a bus for Kimberley, British Columbia and played brilliantly in the Dynamiters net.

FIFTH—The WIHL introduced 12-man hockey in the league that season, and when the Dynamiters met the Vernon Canadians in the Savage Cup finals, they were a tired crew. The Okanagan Senior League played with a 15-man roster that season. The Dynamiters played four games in as many nights in their semi-finals against the Spokane Flyers, and to top it off, rushed right into the WIHL finals against the Nelson Maple Leafs, playing five games in six days. The players were not supermen, and it showed in their series with Vernon.

SIXTH—The Dynamiters were forced to make Kelowna, British Columbia their headquarters, because the BCAHA decided to play games in Penticton, Kelowna, Vernon and Kamloops, because Vernon wasn't supporting senior hockey. In order to bring their roster up to strength, the Dynamiters talked Bill "Tank" Johnston and Jack "Buck" Kavanaugh out of retirement, in order to dress three lines.

Kimberley beat Spokane in Semi-Finals. The Kimberley Dynamiters and Spokane Flyers locked horns in a best-of-five semi-final series; with the Nelson Maple Leafs taking on the last place Trail Smoke Eaters in a similar affair. The Leafs took the Smokies out in four games, with the Dynamiters doing likewise to the Flyers.

Backed by the scintillating goaltending of Earl Betker, the Dynamiters won the opening game against Spokane 5-2, before 1,600 home fans. Claudie Bell paced the Dynamiters with two goals, with singletons going to Buzz Mellor, Gerry Barre and Barry Craig. Lorne Nadeau collected both Spokane goals. Bill Jones, the Dynamiters hard working defenceman, was picked the number one star of the game.

The Dynamiters continued their winning ways by racking up a 6-4 triumph the following night, before 1,700 delirious spectators. Cal Hockley was the Dynamiters big gun with the hat trick, with Buzz Mellor picking up a pair of goals, and Norm Knippleberg the other. Tom Hodges registered two counters for the Flyers, and Frank Kubasek and Lorne Nadeau had one apiece. Gordon Andre, a league All-Star defenceman, was a standout for Kimberley.

The scene switched to Spokane for the next two games, with the Flyers capturing the first game by the score of 4-1. George Senick, Red Tilson, Doug Toole and Lorne Nadeau were the Spokane goal getters. Buzz Mellor ruined Jerry Fodey's bid for a shutout.

Both teams appeared weary, after playing four games in four nights, with the Dynamiters showing just enough pep to tack up a 4-3 victory and in doing so, eliminated the Flyers from the playoff scene. Buzz Mellor continued to lead the Dynamiters with a pair of goals, with Barry Craig and Norm Knippleberg gathering singles. Jackie Miller potted a brace of goals for Spokane, and Lorne Nadeau one.

Dynamiters Hot In Nelson Series. The Kimberley Dynamiters, who had not won a WIHL championship since the 1946-47 season, made no mistakes in the finals against the Nelson Maple Leafs. The Dynamiters, under the capable eye of playing coach Norm Larsen, spotted the Leafs the first game, and then came roaring back to win four in a row.

Dr. Joseph Vingo of Nelson was the WIHL President that season, and made a switch in the playoff pattern. He ordered the first two games to be played in the home arena of the top team, and the following three away from home, and if necessary, the next two back in the rink where the series started.

Norman Larsen, who remembered what happened in the previous year when the Dynamiters won the league championship, and lost out to the Nelson Maple Leafs in the WIHL finals, was determined the same mistake wasn't going to happen again; and had his team humming on all cylinders.

The Dynamiters blew a 4-1 lead in the opening game, before over 2,000 Nelson fans, with the Leafs coming on strong to post a 6-5 verdict. Lee Hyssop sparked the Leafs with two goals, with Mickey Maglio, Murray Parker, Vic Lofvendahl and Joe Bell adding singles. Claudie Bell scored twice for the Dynamiters, with Buzz Mellor, Barry Craig and Norm Knippleberg rounding out the scoring sheet.

The Dynamiters turned the tables on the Leafs the following night, before a capacity crowd, by shading the Leafs 6-5 in overtime. Coach Larsen played the hero role by scoring a pretty goal with only 12 seconds remaining in the first overtime. It had looked bad for the Dynamiters, with less than ten minutes remaining in regulation time, when Earl Betker received his severe back injury. The score was knotted at 5-5 at the time, and the Dynamiters sent out an S.O.S. for either Seth Martin or Reno Zanier, but neither was in the arena. The Dynamiters' spare netminder, Art Gold, was back in Kimberley. Betker insisted on returning, and turned in a sparkling performance. Norm Knippleberg paced the Dynamiters with a pair of goals, with Cal Hockley, Claudie Bell, Buzz Mellor and Larsen one each. Nelson received goals from Joe Bell, Fritz Koehle, Herb Jeffrey, Lee Hyssop and Bruce Carmichael.

Kimberley Takes Three Straight At Home. The Kimberley Dynamiters were at their best playing before capacity crowds at home, and made short order of the Leafs.

The first game saw the Dynamiters strike like lightning twice, before the period was 30 seconds old, and went on to score a convincing 6-2 win. Cal Hockley scored twice, with Buzz Mellor, Norm Knippleberg, Gerry Barre and Claudie Bell hitting once. Lee Hyssop and Fritz Koehle were the Leafs' lamplighters. Diminutive Jerry Fodey was a stand out in the Dynamiters net, and received excellent support from his blueline patrol of Bill Jones, "Terrible" Ted Lebodia, Barry Craig and Gordon "the Giant" Andre.

The Dynamiters could taste victory, and had little trouble in handling the Leafs 5-2 in the fourth game of the series. Claudie Bell came up with a two goal effort, with Buzz Mellor, Gerry Barre and Barry Craig scoring singletons. Herb Jeffrey and Joe Bell gathered the Leafs two counters.

The Maple Leafs pushed the Dynamiters to the limit in the fifth and final game of the best-of-seven series. The game ended with a story book finish, with Ray McNevin standing out like a beacon of light for the Dynamiters. The Dynamiters squeezed out a 3-2 win, thanks to Ray McNevin's two goal performance. He tied the game for Kimberley in the third period, and scored the winner in the third overtime session. It was at least ten seconds before the paralyzed crowd realised that McNevin's long shot ended up behind Chuck Rayner, and then they let out with a yell that rocked the ancestors. Claudie Bell scored for Kimberley in the opening period, with Lee Hyssop and Joe Bell beating Fodey.

Chuck Rayner, the Nelson coach and former star goalie with the New York Rangers of the National Hockey League, pulled off a big surprise by benching regular goalie Ray Mikulan and played himself, in an effort to try to spark the Leafs.

Vernon Trounced Kimberley. The Kimberley Dynamiters were no match for the Vernon Canadians in the hunt for the Savage Cup, and only managed one win in their best-of-seven series.

Vernon won the curtain raiser in a game played at Kelowna, 6-1. The Canadians handled the Dynamiters easily in the second fixture at Vernon 9-2, with the Dynamiters taking the third contest 4-2, also in Vernon. The fourth game was played in Kamloops, with Vernon coming from behind to take a close verdict 5-3, with their final goal scored into an empty net. Vernon wrapped up their first Savage Cup with a convincing 8-1 win in Penticton, before 2,200 fans.

Vernon outscored the Dynamiters 30 goals to 11 in the series. Sherman Blair, a former Dynamiter paced Vernon in the scoring parade with six goals; followed closely by Odie Lowe with five. Claudie Bell was the Dynamiters leading scorer, with four markers to his credit.

The 1954-55 edition of the Vernon Canadians, under the capable guidance of playing coach George Agar, was a well balanced club, backed up by the excellent netminding of Hal Gordon.

The handwriting was on the wall that senior hockey couldn't survive much longer in the Okanagan: for Kelowna had dropped $11,000 in 54-55; Kamloops $7,000; and Vernon only cleared $200 for the entire season; and it was the playoff that bailed them out of serious trouble. They still owed a $10,000 deficit from the previous year.

The Penticton V's, despite the fact they had just won the Allan Cup and the 1955 World Ice Hockey Championships, were having oxygen pumped to them, in order to survive their money crisis.

It wasn't too long before senior hockey folded like a tent, in the once hockey-mad league.

== Standings ==
Nelson Maple Leafs	23-16-2-44.61	190-162
Kimberley Dynamiters	19-14-1-43.75	155-135
Spokane Flyers		16-21-1-34.65	155-176
Trail Smoke Eaters	17-24-2-33.63	174-201

== Semi finals ==
Best of 5

   * Nelson 4 Trail 2
   * Nelson 4 Trail 3
   * Trail 4 Nelson 2
   * Nelson 3 Trail 1

Nelson Maple Leafs beat Trail Smoke Eaters 3 wins to 1.

   * Kimberley 5 Spokane 2
   * Kimberley 6 Spokane 4
   * Kimberley 4 Spokane 3

Kimberley Dynamiters beat Spokane Flyers 3 wins to none.

== Final ==
Best of 7

   * Nelson 6 Kimberley 5
   * Kimberley 6 Nelson 5
   * Kimberley 6 Nelson 2
   * Kimberley 5 Nelson 2
   * Kimberley 3 Nelson 2

Kimberley Dynamiters beat Nelson Maple Leafs 4 wins to 1.

Kimberley Dynamiters advanced to the 1954-55 British Columbia Senior Playoffs.
