= 1956–57 WIHL season =

North American ice hockey season

1956–57 was the 11th season of the Western International Hockey League.

== Standings ==
- Spokane Flyers 31-17-0 250-181
- Trail Smoke Eaters 31-17-0 213-170
- Nelson Maple Leafs 20-28-0 194-241
- Rossland Warriors 14-34-0 163-228

== Semi finals ==
Best of 7

- Rossland 7 Spokane 4
- Spokane 2 Rossland 1
- Spokane 3 Rossland 2
- Spokane 2 Rossland 1
- Spokane 5 Rossland 2

Spokane Flyers beat Rossland Warriors 4 wins to 1.

- Trail 4 Nelson 2
- Trail 5 Nelson 4
- Trail 4 Nelson 3
- Nelson 6 Trail 2
- Trail 5 Nelson 1

Trail Smoke Eaters beat Nelson Maple Leafs 4 wins to 1.

== Final ==
Best of 7

- Spokane 5 Trail 3
- Spokane 9 Trail 3
- Spokane 6 Trail 1
- Spokane 3 Trail 1

Spokane Flyers beat Trail Smoke Eaters 4 wins to none.

Spokane Flyers advanced to the 1956-57 British Columbia Senior Playoffs.
