= 1982–83 WIHL season =

1982–83 was the 36th season of the Western International Hockey League.

== Standings ==
- Nelson Maple Leafs 50 33 14 3 69
- Trail Smoke Eaters 50 30 18 2 62
- Kimberley Dynamiters 50 22 27 1 45
- Cranbrook Royals 50 21 27 2 44
- Elk Valley Blazers 50 20 30 0 40
- Spokane Chiefs 50 19 29 2 40

== Playoffs ==
=== Semi finals ===
Best of 7

- Nelson Maple Leafs defeated Cranbrook Royals 4 games to 2 (6-1, 2-5, 8-4, 5-7, 6-0, 6-5).
- Trail Smoke Eaters defeated Kimberley Dynamiters.

=== Final ===
In the "Best of 7" series final, the Trail Smoke Eaters defeated the Nelson Maple Leafs 4 games to 0 (3-1, 4-2, 5-1, 8-2) to advance to the 1982-83 Western Canada Allan Cup Playoffs.
