= 1970–71 WIHL season =

North American ice hockey season

1970–71 was the 24th season of the Western International Hockey League.

== Standings ==
- Spokane Jets 52 39 11 2 267 147 80
- Kimberley Dynamiters 52 27 22 3 205 200 55
- Nelson Maple Leafs 52 24 27 1 236 237 49
- Cranbrook Royals 52 18 30 4 185 220 40
- Trail Smoke Eaters 52 18 31 3 156 220 39

== Playoff ==
In the Best of 7 semi-finals:

- Nelson defeated Kimberley 4 games to 1(3-4, 3-2 OT, 6-4, 5-3, 2-0)
- Spokane defeated Cranbrook 4 games to 2 (10-3, 3-4, 9-1, 3-4, 7-5, 3-2 OT)

In the Best of 7 final series, the Nelson Maple Leafs defeated the Spokane Jets 4 games to 2 (9-4, 3-4, 3-6, 4-2, 4-3, 5-2). The Nelson Maple Leafs advanced to the 1970-71 Western Canada Allan Cup Playoffs.
