= Spokane Chiefs (WIHL) =

- City: Spokane, Washington
- League: Western International Hockey League
- Operated: 1982–85
- Home arena: Spokane Coliseum
- Colours: Blue, red and white

Championships
- Playoff championships: 1985

The Spokane Chiefs are a defunct senior ice hockey team that played in the Western International Hockey League from 1982 to 1985. They were the 1984–85 Champions of the WIHL. This was the third WIHL franchise to call Spokane home and, just like the previous two, they were forced to cease operations when a Western Hockey League franchise arrived to take over the market. This time the Kelowna Wings moved and became the new Spokane Chiefs in 1985.

== Championships ==
Year	League	Trophy
1984–85	WIHL	Shore-Montgomery Trophy
