= 1973–74 WIHL season =

North American ice hockey season

1973–74 was the 27th season of the Western International Hockey League.

== Standings ==
- Spokane Jets 48 31 15 2 231 175 64
- Cranbrook Royals 48 31 16 1 231 193 63
- Trail Smoke Eaters 48 27 27 1 203 248 41
- Kimberley Dynamiters 48 20 28 0 222 218 40
- Nelson Maple Leafs 48 15 31 2 174 227 32

== Playoffs ==
In the "Best of 7" semi-finals:

- Spokane Jets defeated Kimberley Dynamiters 4 games to 3 (4-6, 2-4, 9-3, 6-2, 2-4, 4-2, 4-0)
- Cranbrook Royals defeated Trail Smoke Eaters 4 games to 3 (3-2, 7-6 OT, 3-7, 2-5, 7-4, 5-6 OT, 12-2)

In the "Best of 7" final series, the Cranbrook Royals defeated Spokane Jets 4 games to 2 (4-5 OT, 6-2, 5-4, 4-5, 3-2 OT, 7-4). The Cranbrook Royals advanced to the 1973-74 Western Canada Allan Cup Playoffs.
