= 1959–60 WIHL season =

North American ice hockey season

1959–60 was the 14th season of the Western International Hockey League.

== Standings ==
- Trail Smoke Eaters 25-13-2-52 240-201
- Nelson Maple Leafs 19-18-3-41 216-193
- Rossland Warriors 13-26-1-27 183-245

== Playoffs ==
=== Semi final (Round-robin tournament) ===
Note: Trail started the series with 3 points, Nelson 2, & Rossland 1.

- Trail Smoke Eaters 5-3-0-13
- Nelson Maple Leafs 4-4-0-10
- Rossland Warriors 3-5-0-7

=== Final (Best of 5) ===
- Trail 7 Nelson 3
- Trail 7 Nelson 6
- Trail 7 Nelson 1

The Trail Smoke Eaters beat Nelson Maple Leafs 3 wins to none.

The Trail Smoke Eaters advanced to the 1959-60 British Columbia Senior Playoffs.
