= 1976–77 WIHL season =

North American ice hockey season

1976–77 was the 30th season of the Western International Hockey League.

== Standings ==
- Kimberley Dynamiters 56 32 22 2 253 225 66
- Cranbrook Royals 56 30 25 1 272 241 61
- Spokane Flyers 56 27 29 0 263 268 54
- Nelson Maple Leafs 56 26 29 1 261 255 53
- Trail Smoke Eaters 56 22 32 2 227 287 46

== Playoffs ==
=== Semi finals ===
Best of 7

- Spokane Flyers defeated Cranbrook Royals 4 games to 3 (9-6, 5–4, 3-4 OT, 4–2, 3–10, 3–5, 5–1)
- Kimberley Dynamiters defeated Nelson Maple Leafs 4 games to 2 (7-6, 1–6, 4–2, 4–7, 9–2, 5–3)

=== Final ===
In the "Best of 7" final series, the Spokane Flyers defeated the Kimberley Dynamiters 4 games to 1 (4-3 2OT, 7–4, 7–2, 2–6, 8–5). The Spokane Flyers advanced to the 1976-77 Western Canada Allan Cup Playoffs.
