= 1963–64 WIHL season =

17th season of the Western International Hockey League

1963–64 was the 17th season of the Western International Hockey League.

The WIHL did not operate during the 1962-63 season.

== Standings ==
- Spokane Jets 48 30 17 1 244 171 61
- Kimberley Dynamiters 48 30 18 0 272 243 60
- Nelson Maple Leafs 48 24 24 0 233 229 48
- Rossland Warriors 48 18 27 3 200 251 39
- Trail Smoke Eaters 48 15 31 2 203 274 32

== Playoffs ==
=== Semi finals ===
- Spokane Jets defeated Rossland Warriors 3 games to 2 (3-4, 4-5, 5-4, 8-3, 2-1)
- Kimberley Dynamiters defeated Nelson Maple Leafs 3 games to 0 (5-0, 6-5, 6-2)

=== Final ===
- Kimberley Dynamiters defeated Spokane Jets 4 games to 3 (7-4, 4-2, 3-5, 3-4, 4-3, 0-3, 6-3)

Since this was the only senior league in the province, the Kimberley Dynamiters advanced to the 1963-64 Western Canada Allan Cup Playoffs.
