= Calgary Stampeders (WIHL) =

Ice hockey team in Alberta, Canada

- City: Calgary, Alberta
- League: Western International Hockey League
- Founded: 1978
- Operated: 1978 – January 7, 1979

The Calgary Stampeders was a Canadian senior men's ice hockey team that played 25 games of the 1978–79 season in the Western International Hockey League. In 25 games played, the team scored 117 goals and allowed 122 goals against to compiled a record of 12 wins, 11 losses and two ties for a total of 26 points. This team suspended its operations, midway through the season, on January 7, 1979.
