= 1980–81 WIHL season =

North American ice hockey season

1980–81 was the 34th season of the Western International Hockey League.

== Standings ==
- Cranbrook Royals 40 24 12 4 239 192 52
- Kimberley Dynamiters 40 21 16 3 207 199 45
- Trail Smoke Eaters 40 22 18 0 217 202 44
- Nelson Maple Leafs 40 16 22 2 161 197 34
- Elk Valley Blazers 40 12 27 1 178 238 25

== Playoffs ==
=== Semi finals ===
Best of 7

- Cranbrook Royals defeated Nelson Maple Leafs 4 games to 1 (5-8, 6-3, 4-3 OT, 7-6 OT, C-N)
- Kimberley Dynamiters defeated Trail Smoke Eaters 4 games to 2 (9-7, 5-4, 10-3, 4-2, 3-8, 7-5)

=== Final ===
In the "best of 7" final, Kimberley Dynamiters defeated Cranbrook Royals 4 games to 2 (7-3, 7-4, 7-3, 4-11, 5-11, 3-1) to advance to the 1980-81 British Columbia Senior Playoffs.
