= 1964–65 WIHL season =

North American ice hockey season

1964–65 was the 18th season of the Western International Hockey League.

== Standings ==
- Kimberley Dynamiters 26-18-4-56
- Spokane Jets 25-20-3-53
- Nelson Maple Leafs 24-22-2-50
- Trail Smoke Eaters 22-23-3-47
- Rossland Warriors 16-30-2-34

== Playoffs ==
=== Semi finals (best of 5) ===
- Nelson Maple Leafs defeated Spokane Jets 3 games to 0 (6–4, 7–6, 5–2)
- Kimberley Dynamiters defeated Trail Smoke Eaters 3 games to 1 (2–1, 6–2, 3–10, 3–2)

=== Final (best of 7) ===
- The Nelson Maple Leafs defeated The Kimberley Dynamiters 4 games to 3 (5–1, 2–3, 1–3, 5–4, 3–5, 9–6, 6–2)

The Nelson Maple Leafs advanced to the 1964-65 Western Canada Allan Cup Playoffs.
