= 1965–66 WIHL season =

North American ice hockey season

1965–66 was the 19th season of the Western International Hockey League.

Prior to the commencement of the 1965–66 WIHL season it was announced that the Cranbrook Royals would be added to the league, with the result being that the WIHL would comprise six teams. In addition to the Washington-based Spokane Jets, the other teams that made up the 1965-66 version of the WIHL were the British Columbia-based Kimberley Dynamiters, Nelson Maple Leafs, Rossland Warriors and Trail Smoke Eaters.

== Standings ==
- Spokane Jets 50 33 14 3 264 178 69
- Nelson Maple Leafs 50 31 15 4 253 186 66
- Kimberley Dynamiters 50 31 18 1 318 207 63
- Rossland Warriors 50 20 27 3 220 255 43
- Trail Smoke Eaters 50 21 29 0 229 271 42
- Cranbrook Royals 50 8 41 1 178 365 17

== Playoffs ==
=== Semi finals (best of 7) ===
- Kimberley defeated Nelson 4 games to 0 (5-4, 2–9, 6–2, 3–1, 1–9, 4-3 2OT)
- Spokane defeated Rossland 4 games to 1 (8-3, 4-5 OT, 5–2, 8–3, 5–3)

=== Final (best of 7) ===
- Kimberley defeated Spokane 4 games to 1 (5-4, 2–1, 1–5, 5–4, 5–0)

The Kimberley Dynamiters advanced to the 1965-66 Western Canada Allan Cup Playoffs.
