= 1950–51 WIHL season =

North American ice hockey season

1950–51 was the fifth season of the Western International Hockey League.

== Standings ==
- Spokane Flyers 39-21-2 .645 319-246
- Trail Smoke Eaters 26-16-4 .609 205-170
- Kimberley Dynamiters 20-21-1 .488 198-213
- Nelson Maple Leafs 15-30-1 .337 155-238

Played interlocking with the Okanagan Mainline League.

== League Championship final ==
Best of 5

- Trail 5 Spokane 3
- Spokane 6 Trail 4
- Trail 5 Spokane 4
- Trail 7 Spokane 2

Trail Smoke Eaters beat Spokane Flyers 3 wins to 1.

Note: Spokane Flyers were not eligible for the Allan Cup.

== Semi final ==
Best of 5

- Kimberley 9 Nelson 2
- Nelson 2 Kimberley 1
- Kimberley 3 Nelson 1
- Kimberley 8 Nelson 5

Kimberley Dynamiters beat Nelson Maple Leafs 3 wins to 1.

== Final ==
Best of 5

- Trail 6 Kimberley 1
- Trail 8 Kimberley 2
- Kimberley 8 Trail 3
- Kimberley 4 Trail 3
- Trail 5 Kimberley 3

Trail Smoke Eaters beat Kimberley Dynamiters 3 wins to 2.

Trail Smoke Eaters advanced to the 1950-51 British Columbia Senior Playoffs.
