= 1967–68 WIHL season =

North American ice hockey season

1967–68 was the 21st season of the Western International Hockey League.

== Standings ==
- Spokane Jets 48 36 12 0 251 162 .750
- Nelson Maple Leafs 44 26 18 0 220 145 .591
- Kimberley Dynamiters 44 22 22 0 202 188 .500
- Trail Smoke Eaters 44 17 27 0 159 209 .386
- Cranbrook Royals 44 11 33 0 149 277 .250

== Playoffs ==
=== Semi finals (best of 5) ===
- Spokane defeated Trail 3 games to 0 (7-0, 4-3, 10-4)
- Kimberley defeated Nelson 3 games to 0 (4-2, 4-3 2OT, 5-2)

=== Final (best of 7) ===
- Spokane defeated Kimberley 4 games to 1 (6-0, 6-0, 4-6, 5-2, 9-2)

The Spokane Jets advanced to the 1967-68 Western Canada Allan Cup Playoffs.
