= 1977–78 WIHL season =

North American ice hockey season

1977–78 was the 31st season of the North American senior amateur Western International Hockey League, the final round of which was won by the Kimberley Dynamiters.

== Standings ==
- Spokane Flyers 56 39 16 1 328 186 79
- Cranbrook Royals 56 34 22 0 292 238 68
- Kimberley Dynamiters 56 33 23 0 266 260 66
- Trail Smoke Eaters 56 21 33 2 239 297 44
- Nelson Maple Leafs 56 11 44 1 208 352 23

== Playoffs ==
=== Semi finals ===
Best of 7

- Spokane Flyers defeated Trail Smoke Eaters 4 games to 0 (5-4 OT, 5–0, 5–0, 8–2)
- Kimberley Dynamiters defeated Cranbrook Royals 4 games to 2 (5-4 2OT, 7–4, 2–5, 2–1, 3-4 2OT, 4–1)

=== Final ===
In the "Best of 7" series final, the Kimberley Dynamiters defeated the Spokane Flyers 4 games to 2 (3-2, 4–6, 6–2, 5–3, 2–5, 6–3). The Kimberley Dynamiters advanced to the 1977-78 Western Canada Allan Cup Playoffs.
