= 1982 Allan Cup =

Canadian senior ice hockey championship

The Allan Cup trophy

The 1982 Allan Cup was the Canadian senior ice hockey championship for the 1981–82 senior "A" season. The event was hosted by the Cranbrook Royals in Cranbrook, British Columbia. The 1982 playoff marked the 74th time that the Allan Cup has been awarded.

== Teams ==
- Petrolia Squires (Eastern Canadian Champions)
- Cranbrook Royals (Western Canadian Champions)

== Best-of-Seven Series ==
Cranbrook Royals 7 - Petrolia Squires 2
Cranbrook Royals 7 - Petrolia Squires 3
Cranbrook Royals 2 - Petrolia Squires 1
Petrolia Squires 6 - Cranbrook Royals 1
Cranbrook Royals 7 - Petrolia Squires 3
