= 1974–75 WIHL season =

North American ice hockey season

1974–75 was the 28th season of the Western International Hockey League.

== Standings ==
- Spokane Flyers 53 35 16 2 288 218 72
- Cranbrook Royals 53 33 17 3 283 198 69
- Kimberley Dynamiters 53 23 30 0 208 248 46
- Trail Smoke Eaters 53 21 30 2 224 251 44
- Nelson Maple Leafs 53 18 34 1 206 272 37
- Portland Buckaroos (independent team) 25 10 13 2 103 125 22

== Playoffs ==
In the "Best of 7" semi-finals:

- Spokane Flyers defeated Trail Smoke Eaters 4 games to 1 (4-3, 4–1, 4–3, 3–7, 7–1)
- Cranbrook Royals defeated Kimberley Dynamiters 4 games to 2 (7-8 OT, 7–3, 4–2, 7–10, 11–3, 8–2)

In the "Best of 7" final, the Spokane Flyers defeated Cranbrook Royals 4 games to 3 (3-2, 3–7, 2–6, 6–3, 4–3, 4-5 OT, 13–7). The Spokane Flyers advanced to the 1974-75 Western Canada Allan Cup Playoffs.
