= 1957–58 WIHL season =

North American ice hockey season

1957–58 was the 12th season of the Western International Hockey League.

== Standings ==
- Spokane Flyers 30-17-1-61 218–171
- Rossland Warriors 28-20-0-56 190–169
- Nelson Maple Leafs 20-27-1-41 184–211
- Trail Smoke Eaters 17-31-0-34 175–216

== Playoffs ==
=== Semi finals ===
Spokane vs. Trail (Best of 7). Spokane Flyers beat Trail Smoke Eaters 4 wins to 3.

- Trail 4 Spokane 2
- Trail 7 Spokane 3
- Spokane 10 Trail 3
- Trail 5 Spokane 2
- Spokane 5 Trail 2
- Spokane 3 Trail 2
- Spokane 4 Trail 2

Nelson vs. Rossland (Best of 7). Rossland Warriors beat Nelson Maple Leafs 4 wins to 1.

- Nelson 5 Rossland 3
- Rossland 5 Nelson 3
- Rossland 5 Nelson 1
- Rossland 3 Nelson 2
- Rossland 5 Nelson 2

=== Final ===
Rossland vs. Spokane (Best of 7). Rossland Warriors beat Spokane Flyers 4 wins to 2.

- Rossland 4 Spokane 3
- Spokane 6 Rossland 0
- Spokane 5 Rossland 0
- Rossland 3 Spokane 2
- Rossland 2 Spokane 1
- Rossland 4 Spokane 2

Rossland Warriors advanced to the 1957-58 British Columbia Senior Playoffs.
