= 1969–70 WIHL season =

North American ice hockey season

1969–70 was the 23rd season of the Western International Hockey League.

The Western International Hockey League played an interleague schedule with the Alberta Senior Hockey League.

== Standings ==
- Spokane Jets 50 33 14 3 219 123 69
- Nelson Maple Leafs 50 27 21 2 241 209 56
- Kimberley Dynamiters 46 19 26 1 167 190 39
- Cranbrook Royals 50 19 30 1 208 254 39
- Trail Smoke Eaters 50 12 37 1 174 293 25

== Playoffs ==
=== Semi finals (best of 7) ===
- Spokane defeated Cranbrook 4 games to 1
- Nelson defeated Kimberley 4 games to 3

=== Final (best of 7) ===
- Spokane defeated Nelson 4 games to 0

The Spokane Jets advanced to the 1969-70 Western Canada Allan Cup Playoffs.
