= 1953–54 WIHL season =

North American ice hockey season

The 1953–54 Western International Hockey League season was the 8th season in the league's history.

== History ==
During an end of season meeting, it was moved that all playoff games be best-of-five sets, for it was felt that a seven-game series, which stretches into eight, not only drains the pocketbooks of the fans, but drains the stamina of the players. The question of playing an equal number of games in the WIHL also came up for discussion, with the general feeling being that if Spokane's Flyers can play for the Allan Cup, then they should receive no extra favours.

== Standings ==
Team W-L-T Win% GF–GA

- Kimberley Dynamiters 24-16-4 .591 233-186
- Nelson Maple Leafs 26-27-3 .491 252-247
- Spokane Flyers 28-32-8 .471 286-291
- Trail Smoke Eaters 21-28-7 .438 230-273

Played interlocking with the Okanagan Senior League.

== Playoffs ==
=== Semi finals ===
Best of 5

- Kimberley 5 Spokane 0
- Kimberley 5 Spokane 3
- Spokane 4 Kimberley 0
- Spokane 5 Kimberley 2
- Kimberley 10 Spokane 3

Kimberley Dynamiters beat Spokane Flyers 3 wins to 2.

- Nelson 7 Trail 4
- Nelson 5 Trail 3
- Trail 7 Nelson 4
- Nelson 5 Trail 2

Nelson Maple Leafs beat Trail Smoke Eaters 3 wins to 1.

=== Final ===
Best of 5

- Kimberley 2 Nelson 1
- Nelson 4 Kimberley 3
- Nelson 5 Kimberley 2
- Nelson 8 Kimberley 2

Nelson Maple Leafs beat Kimberley Dynamiters 3 wins to 1.

Nelson Maple Leafs advanced to the 1953-54 British Columbia Senior Playoffs.
