= 1961–62 WIHL season =

North American ice hockey season

1961–62 was the 16th season of the Western International Hockey League.

== Standings ==
- Trail Smoke Eaters 38 34 4 0 299 134 68
- Nelson Maple Leafs 38 18 19 1 186 179 37
- Kimberley Dynamiters 30 9 20 1 120 173 26¼
- Rossland Warriors 38 9 29 0 142 264 18

== League awards ==
- Howie Hornby, a centre with the Nelson Maple Leafs, won the Howard Anderson Memorial Trophy which is awarded annually to the league's most valuable and sportsmanlike player.
