= 1972–73 WIHL season =

Hockey season

1972–73 was the 26th season of the Western International Hockey League.

== Standings ==
- Spokane Jets 48 28 20 0 256 178 56
- Trail Smoke Eaters 48 24 23 1 185 218 49
- Cranbrook Royals 48 23 25 0 218 203 46
- Kimberley Dynamiters 48 22 25 1 221 251 45
- Nelson Maple Leafs 48 21 25 2 189 219 44

== Playoffs ==
In the "Best of 7" semi-finals:

- Spokane Jets defeated Kimberley Dynamiters 4 games to 1 (3-1, 5-3, 4-5 OT, 4-3, 3-2)
- Trail Smoke Eaters defeated Cranbrook Royals 4 games to 3 (3-2 OT, 0-1 OT, 6-1, 1-9, 6-1, 2-4, 5-3)

In the "Best of 7" final series, the Spokane Jets defeated Trail Smoke Eaters 4 games to 1 (7-3, 2-3, 3-2, 8-2, 9-4). The Spokane Jets advanced to the 1972-73 Western Canada Allan Cup Playoffs.
