= 1958–59 WIHL season =

13th WIHL season

1958–59 WIHL season was the 13th season of the Western International Hockey League.

== Standings ==
- Nelson Maple Leafs 21–17–2–44 171–154
- Rossland Warriors 19–19–2–40 178–173
- Trail Smoke Eaters 17–21–2–36 144–166

== Playoffs ==
=== Semi final (Round-robin tournament) ===
- Rossland 6 Nelson 2
- Nelson 3 Trail 2
- Rossland 5 Trail 2
- Nelson 2 Rossland 1
- Nelson 4 Trail 3
- Rossland 8 Trail 4
- Trail 4 Rossland 3
- Trail 5 Nelson 4
- Rossland 4 Trail 3
- Nelson 6 Rossland 3
- Trail 4 Nelson 0
- Nelson 6 Rossland 2
- Nelson Maple Leafs 5–3–0–10 27–26
- Rossland Warriors 4–4–0–8 33–29
- Trail Smoke Eaters 3–5–0–6 27–32

=== Final (Best of 5) ===
- Nelson 9 Rossland 4
- Nelson 5 Rossland 4
- Nelson 4 Rossland 1

The Nelson Maple Leafs beat Rossland Warriors 3 wins to none. The Nelson Maple Leafs advanced to the 1958–59 British Columbia Senior Playoffs.
