= 1951–52 WIHL season =

Sixth season of the Western International Hockey League

1951–52 was the sixth season of the Western International Hockey League.

== Standings ==
- Spokane Flyers 37-24-6 .597
- Trail Smoke Eaters 24-21-2 .532
- Nelson Maple Leafs 21-24-2 .468
- Kimberley Dynamiters 13-27-3 .337

Played interlocking with Pacific Coast Senior League & Okanagan Senior League.

== League Championship final ==
Best of 5

- 'Trail 8 Spokane 3
- Spokane 7 Trail 3
- Trail 6 Spokane 3
- Spokane 5 Trail 2
- Trail 5 Spokane 3

Trail Smoke Eaters beat Spokane Flyers 3 wins to 2.

Note: Spokane Flyers were not eligible for the Allan Cup.

== Semi final ==
Best of 5

- Nelson 6 Kimberley 2
- Kimberley 6 Nelson 5
- Nelson 2 Kimberley 1
- Nelson 6 Kimberley 4

Nelson Maple Leafs beat Kimberley Dynamiters 3 wins to 1.

== Final ==
Best of 5

- Trail 4 Nelson 3
- Nelson 9 Trail 3
- Trail 9 Nelson 1
- Nelson 4 Trail 3
- Trail 10 Nelson 2

Trail Smoke Eaters beat Nelson Maple Leafs 3 wins to 2.

Trail Smoke Eaters advanced to the 1951-52 British Columbia Senior Playoffs.
