= 1978 Allan Cup =

Canadian senior ice hockey championship

The Allan Cup trophy

The 1978 Allan Cup was the Canadian senior ice hockey championship for the 1977–78 senior "A" season. The event was hosted by the Kimberley Dynamiters in Kimberley, British Columbia. The 1978 playoff marked the 70th time that the Allan Cup has been awarded.

== Teams ==
- Brantford Alexanders (Eastern Canadian Champions)
- Kimberley Dynamiters (Western Canadian Champions)

== Best-of-Seven Series ==
Kimberley Dynamiters 6 - Brantford Alexanders 2
Kimberley Dynamiters 4 - Brantford Alexanders 2
Brantford Alexanders 5 - Kimberley Dynamiters 3
Kimberley Dynamiters 5 - Brantford Alexanders 2
Kimberley Dynamiters 7 - Brantford Alexanders 3
