= 1972 Allan Cup =

Canadian senior ice hockey championship

The Allan Cup trophy

The 1972 Allan Cup was the Canadian senior ice hockey championship for the 1971–72 senior "A" season. The event was hosted by the Spokane Jets and Spokane, Washington with Kimberley, British Columbia. The 1972 playoff marked the 64th time that the Allan Cup has been awarded. The event was an international series between the Spokane Jets American team and the Barrie Flyers Canadian team.

== Teams ==
- Barrie Flyers (Eastern Canadian Champions)
- Spokane Jets (Western Canadian Champions)

== Best-of-seven series ==
Date	Location	Score
May 6	Spokane, WA; Spokane Coliseum	Spokane Jets 3 - Barrie Flyers 0
May 7	Spokane, WA	Spokane Jets 8 - Barrie Flyers 3
May 12	Kimberley, BC; Kimberley Civic Centre	Barrie Flyers 4 - Spokane Jets 2
May 13	Kimberley, BC	Barrie Flyers 4 - Spokane Jets 1
May 14	Spokane, WA	Spokane Jets 7 - Barrie Flyers 3
May 15	Spokane, WA	Spokane Jets 6 - Barrie Flyers 3

Spokane wins the series 4–2
