= 1965 Allan Cup =

Canadian senior ice hockey championship

The Allan Cup trophy

The 1965 Allan Cup was the Canadian senior ice hockey championship for the 1964–65 senior "A" season. The event was hosted by the Sherbrooke Beavers and Sherbrooke, Quebec. The 1965 playoff marked the 57th time that the Allan Cup has been awarded.

== Teams ==
- Sherbrooke Beavers (Eastern Canadian Champions)
- Nelson Maple Leafs (Western Canadian Champions)

== Playdowns ==
=== Allan Cup Best-of-Seven Series ===
Sherbrooke Beavers 7 - Nelson Maple Leafs 3
Sherbrooke Beavers 4 - Nelson Maple Leafs 1
Sherbrooke Beavers 9 - Nelson Maple Leafs 2
Sherbrooke Beavers 8 - Nelson Maple Leafs 4

=== Eastern Playdowns ===
Quarter-final

Sherbrooke Beavers defeated New Glasgow Rangers 3-games-to-1

New Glasgow Rangers 4 - Sherbrooke Beavers 2
Sherbrooke Beavers 8 - New Glasgow Rangers 0
Sherbrooke Beavers 15 - New Glasgow Rangers 4
Sherbrooke Beavers 8 - New Glasgow Rangers 1

Semi-final

Woodstock Athletics defeated Rouyn-Noranda Alouettes 4-games-to-none

Woodstock Athletics 9 - Rouyn-Noranda Alouettes 3
Woodstock Athletics 7 - Rouyn-Noranda Alouettes 4
Woodstock Athletics 7 - Rouyn-Noranda Alouettes 6
Woodstock Athletics 8 - Rouyn-Noranda Alouettes 5

Sherbrooke Beavers defeated Kingston Aces 3-games-to-none

Sherbrooke Beavers 9 - Kingston Aces 4
Sherbrooke Beavers 5 - Kingston Aces 1
Sherbrooke Beavers 10 - Kingston Aces 5

Final

Sherbrooke Beavers defeated Woodstock Athletics 4-games-to-none

Sherbrooke Beavers 5 - Woodstock Athletics 2
Sherbrooke Beavers 4 - Woodstock Athletics 1
Sherbrooke Beavers 6 - Woodstock Athletics 0
Sherbrooke Beavers 5 - Woodstock Athletics 2

=== Western Playdowns ===
Quarter-final

Nelson Maple Leafs defeated Drumheller Miners 3-games-to-1

Nelson Maple Leafs 3 - Drumheller Miners 0
Nelson Maple Leafs 6 - Drumheller Miners 3
Drumheller Miners 3 - Nelson Maple Leafs 1
Nelson Maple Leafs 3 - Drumheller Miners 0

Semi-final

Nelson Maple Leafs defeated Moose Jaw Pla-Mors 3-games-to-1

Nelson Maple Leafs 7 - Moose Jaw Pla-Mors 1
Nelson Maple Leafs 9 - Moose Jaw Pla-Mors 2
Moose Jaw Pla-Mors 5 - Nelson Maple Leafs 3
Nelson Maple Leafs 7 - Moose Jaw Pla-Mors 5

Warroad Lakers defeated Transcona Lions 3-games-to-1

Warroad Lakers 5 - Transcona Lions 1
Warroad Lakers 7 - Transcona Lions 1
Warroad Lakers 9 - Transcona Lions 2

Final

Nelson Maple Leafs defeated Warroad Lakers 3-games-to-1

Nelson Maple Leafs 6 - Warroad Lakers 2
Nelson Maple Leafs 6 - Warroad Lakers 3
Warroad Lakers 3 - Nelson Maple Leafs 2
Nelson Maple Leafs 6 - Warroad Lakers 3
