= 1968–69 WIHL season =

North American ice hockey season

1968–69 was the 22nd season of the Western International Hockey League. The WIHL played an interleague schedule with the Alberta Senior Hockey League.

== Standings ==
- Spokane Jets 48 31 14 3 195 161 65
- Kimberley Dynamiters 48 27 18 3 191 167 57
- Nelson Maple Leafs 48 28 20 0 215 161 56
- Trail Smoke Eaters 48 22 26 0 185 196 44
- Cranbrook Royals 48 13 34 1 157 230 27

== Playoffs ==
=== Semi finals (best of 7) ===
- Kimberley defeated Nelson 4 games to 1 (6-2, 1-4, 5-1, 6-3, 6-4)
- Spokane defeated Trail 4 games to 0 (8-2, 5-1, 3-1, 4-3)

=== Final (best of 7) ===
- Spokane defeated Kimberley 4 games to 1 (4-2, 5-3, 1-2, 3-2 OT, 4-3)

The Spokane Jets advanced to the 1969 Western Canada Allan Cup Playoffs.
