= 1949–50 WIHL season =

Inch of Tinch

1949–50 was the fourth season of the Western International Hockey League.

== Standings ==
Spokane Flyers	        38-20-2	.650
Trail Smoke Eaters	20-23-1	.466
Nelson Maple Leafs	19-22-3	.466
Kimberley Dynamiters	15-27-2	.372

== League Championship final ==
Best of 5

   * Spokane 11 Trail 3
   * Trail 9 Spokane 1
   * Spokane 4 Trail 2
   * Spokane 2 Trail 1

Spokane Flyers beat Trail Smoke Eaters 3 wins to 1.

Note: Spokane Flyers were not eligible for the Allan Cup so the Trail Smoke Eaters advanced to the final.

== Semi final ==
Best of 5

   * Kimberley 4 Nelson 3
   * Kimberley 6 Nelson 2
   * Kimberley 5 Nelson 3

Kimberley Dynamiters beat Nelson Maple Leafs 3 wins to none.

== Final ==
Best of 5

   * Trail 6 Kimberley 2
   * Trail 6 Kimberley 3
   * Kimberley 5 Trail 3
   * Kimberley 5 Trail 3
   * Trail 5 Kimberley 4

Trail Smoke Eaters beat Kimberley Dynamiters 3 wins to 2.

Trail Smoke Eaters advanced to the 1949-50 British Columbia Senior Playoffs.
