= 1975–76 WIHL season =

29th Western International Hockey League

1975–76 was the 29th season of the Western International Hockey League.

== Standings ==
- Cranbrook Royals 48 29 19 0 227 185 58
- Trail Smoke Eaters 48 29 19 0 200 193 58
- Spokane Flyers 48 26 22 0 212 185 52
- Kimberley Dynamiters 48 18 29 1 202 227 37
- Nelson Maple Leafs 48 17 30 1 177 228 35

== Playoffs ==
=== Semi finals ===
Best of 7

- Cranbrook Royals defeated Kimberley Dynamiters 4 games to 1 (6-4, 3-4, 4-1, 7-3, 4-1)
- Spokane Flyers defeated Trail Smoke Eaters 4 games to 1 (6-2, 5-4, 0-0, 4-6, 7-4)

The third game of the series between Spokane and Trail was called off due to a brawl.

=== Final ===
In the "Best of 7" final, the Spokane Flyers defeated Cranbrook Royals 4 games to 3 (1-3, 5-4, 7-6, 3-4 OT, 0-4, 8-4, 6-5). The Spokane Flyers advanced to the 1976 Western Canada Allan Cup Playoffs.
