= 1970 Allan Cup =

Canadian senior ice hockey championship

The Allan Cup trophy

The 1970 Allan Cup was the Canadian senior ice hockey championship for the 1969–70 senior "A" season. The event was hosted by the Spokane Jets in Spokane, Washington. The 1970 playoff marked the 62nd time that the Allan Cup has been awarded.

The 1970 Allan Cup marked the first time the Allan Cup final was hosted in the United States, as well as the first time an American team has won the Allan Cup.

== Teams ==
- Orillia Terriers (Eastern Canadian Champions)
- Spokane Jets (Western Canadian Champions)

== Playdowns ==
=== Allan Cup Best-of-Seven Series ===
Spokane Jets 5 - Orillia Terriers 2
Spokane Jets 5 - Orillia Terriers 0
Orillia Terriers 5 - Spokane Jets 2
Orillia Terriers 6 - Spokane Jets 2
Spokane Jets 2 - Orillia Terriers 1
Spokane Jets 6 - Orillia Terriers 3

=== Eastern Playdowns ===
Central Semi-final

Orillia Terriers defeated Sault Ste. Marie Canadians 3-games-to-none

Orillia Terriers 6 - Sault Ste. Marie Canadians 5
Orillia Terriers 6 - Sault Ste. Marie Canadians 4
Orillia Terriers 6 - Sault Ste. Marie Canadians 3

East Semi-final

Victoriaville Tigers defeated St. John's Capitals 3-games-to-1

Victoriaville Tigers 6 - St. John's Capitals 5
Victoriaville Tigers 4 - St. John's Capitals 2
St. John's Capitals 3 - Victoriaville Tigers 1
Victoriaville Tigers 7 - St. John's Capitals 3

Final

Orillia Terriers defeated Victoriaville Tigers 4-games-to-2

Victoriaville Tigers 8 - Orillia Tigers 7
Victoriaville Tigers 6 - Orillia Tigers 3
Orillia Terriers 6 - Victoriaville Tigers 2
Orillia Terriers 5 - Victoriaville Tigers 3
Orillia Terriers 3 - Victoriaville Tigers 2
Orillia Terriers 5 - Victoriaville Tigers 4

=== Western Playdowns ===
Quarter-final

St. Boniface Mohawks defeated Fort William Beavers 3-games-to-1

St. Boniface Mohawks 5 - Fort William Beavers 2
St. Boniface Mohawks 6 - Fort William Beavers 4
Fort William Beavers 11 - St. Boniface Mohawks 6
St. Boniface Mohawks 3 - Fort William Beavers 1

Pacific Semi-final

Spokane Jets defeated Calgary Stampeders 3-games-to-none

Spokane Jets 4 - Calgary Stampeders 1
Spokane Jets 4 - Calgary Stampeders 0
Spokane Jets 5 - Calgary Stampeders 2

West Semi-final

St. Boniface Mohawks defeated Yorkton Terriers 3-games-to-2

Yorkton Terriers 7 - St. Boniface Mohawks 3
St. Boniface Mohawks 6 - Yorkton Terriers 3
Yorkton Terriers 4 - St. Boniface Mohawks 2
St. Boniface Mohawks 4 - Yorkton Terriers 2
St. Boniface Mohawks 4 - Yorkton Terriers 2

Final

Spokane Jets defeated St. Boniface Mohawks 3-games-to-1

Spokane Jets 5 - St. Boniface Mohawks 2
Spokane Jets 4 - St. Boniface Mohawks 2
St. Boniface Mohawks 6 - Spokane Jets 5
Spokane Jets 5 - St. Boniface Mohawks 3
