= 1972–73 WHL season =

- League: Western Hockey League
- Sport: Ice hockey
- Games: 72
- Teams: 6

Regular season
- Season champions: Phoenix Roadrunners

President's Cup
- Champions: Phoenix Roadrunners
- Runners-up: Salt Lake Golden Eagles

Seasons
- 1971–72 1973–74

The 1972–73 WHL season was the 21st season of the Western Hockey League. The Phoenix Roadrunners were the President's Cup champions as they beat the Salt Lake Golden Eagles in four games in the final series.

== Teams ==
1972–73 Western Hockey League
Team	City	Arena	Capacity
Denver Spurs	Denver, Colorado	Denver Coliseum	8,140
Phoenix Roadrunners	Phoenix, Arizona	Arizona Veterans Memorial Coliseum	12,371
Portland Buckaroos	Portland, Oregon	Memorial Coliseum	12,000
Salt Lake Golden Eagles	Salt Lake City, Utah	Salt Palace	10,594
San Diego Gulls	San Diego, California	San Diego Sports Arena	12,920
Seattle Totems	Seattle, Washington	Seattle Center Coliseum	12,250

=== Map of teams ===
WHL Teams

== Final standings ==
Final Season Standings
R	Team	GP	W	L	T	GF	GA	Pts
**1**	**Phoenix Roadrunners**	**72**	**37**	**26**	**9**	**310**	**250**	**83**
**2**	**Salt Lake Golden Eagles**	**72**	**32**	**25**	**15**	**288**	**259**	**79**
**3**	**San Diego Gulls**	**72**	**32**	**29**	**11**	**239**	**223**	**75**
**4**	**Denver Spurs**	**72**	**27**	**32**	**13**	**264**	**275**	**67**
5	Seattle Totems	72	26	32	14	270	286	66
6	Portland Buckaroos	72	21	39	12	226	287	54

bold - qualified for playoffs

== Playoffs ==
Round 1
1	**Phoenix Roadrunners**	**4**
3	San Diego Gulls	2
2	**Salt Lake Golden Eagles**	**4**
4	Denver Spurs	1

Finals
1	**Phoenix Roadrunners**	**4**
4	Salt Lake Golden Eagles	0

The Phoenix Roadrunners win the President's Cup 4 games to 0.

== Awards ==
1972-73 WHL awards
Award	Recipient
President's Cup	Phoenix Roadrunners
Outstanding Goalkeeper Award	Ken Broderick
Leading Scorer Award	Rob Walton
George Leader Cup	Ken Broderick
Rookie Award	Ron Huston
Fred J. Hume Cup	Andy Hebenton
Hal Laycoe Cup	Dave Dunn
