= Elk Valley Blazers =

Defunct men's ice hockey team from British Columbia

The Elk Valley Blazers were a senior men's ice hockey team that played out of Fernie, British Columbia. They played in the Western International Hockey League from 1979 until the league folded in 1988. They won the last league championship and the Savage Cup in 1987-88.
