= Rossland Warriors =

Canadian ice hockey team

The Rossland Warriors are a senior men's ice hockey team that operated out of Rossland, British Columbia. They played in the Western International Hockey League for ten seasons, from 1956–1967, leaving the league due to financial troubles. The Warriors won the WIHL league title during the 1957–58 season, losing to the Kelowna Packers in the Allan Cup playoffs. Rossland won the Coy Cup in 2007.

== Season records ==
Season	Games	Won	Lost	Tied	Points	Goals for Goals against	Standing	Playoffs	
1956-57	48	14	34	0	-	163	228	4th	Lost Semi Final	
1957-58	48	28	20	0	56	190	169	2nd	Won Final, Lost BC	
1958-59	40	19	19	2	40	178	173	2nd	Lost Final	
1959-60	40	13	26	1	27	183	245	3rd	Lost Semi Final	
1960-61	36	13	22	1	27	150	197	3rd	Lost Semi Final	
1961-62	38	9	29	0	18	142	264	4th	out of playoffs	
1963-64	48	18	27	3	39	200	251	4th	Lost Semi Final	
1964-65	48	16	30	2	34	-	-	5th	out of playoffs	
1965-66	50	20	27	3	43	220	255	5th	out of playoffs	
1966-67	50	18	29	3	39	201	264	5th	out of playoffs
