= Spokane Flyers (1948–1958) =

American senior ice hockey team

- City: Spokane, Washington
- League: Western International Hockey League
- Operated: 1948–58
- Home arena: Eagles Ice Arena, Spokane Coliseum

Championships
- Playoff championships: 1949, 1950, 1953, 1956, 1957

The Spokane Flyers were a senior ice hockey team based in Spokane, Washington. They played in the Western International Hockey League (WIHL) from 1948–49 to the 1957–58.

== History ==
The Flyers were the 1950 United States senior west champions, and five-time league champions. Unfortunately, the team was a victim of its own success. The popularity of ice hockey in Spokane drew the attention of other leagues and, in 1958, the Western Hockey League announced plans to place a new franchise in town. The new franchise was initially named it the 'Spokane Flyers' in honor of their predecessor. However, because the Edmonton Flyers already played in the WHL, the league rules that Edmonton owned that moniker and forced the team to choose another name. A fan vote was held and 'Spokes' was winner.
