= Spokane Jets =

- City: Spokane, Washington
- League: Western International Hockey League
- Operated: 1963–74
- Home arena: Spokane Coliseum
- Colours: Blue, red and white

Franchise history
- 1963–1974: Spokane Jets
- 1974–1980: Spokane Flyers

Championships
- Playoff championships: 1968, 1969, 1970, 1972, 1974

The Spokane Jets were a senior men's ice hockey team that played out of Spokane, Washington. They played in the Western International Hockey League (WIHL) from 1963–64 through 1973–74.

Prior to 1963 the Spokane Flyers were the city's entry in the WIHL. The Spokane Jets were renamed the Flyers in 1974.

In 1969–70, the Spokane Jets became the first United States–based team to win the Allan Cup.

== Championships ==
- 1967-68, WIHL title and the British Columbia senior championship
- 1968-69, WIHL title and the British Columbia senior championship
- 1969-70, WIHL title and the British Columbia senior championship
- 1969-70, Allan Cup
- 1971-72, WIHL title and the British Columbia senior championship
- 1971-72, Allan Cup
- 1972-73, WIHL title and the British Columbia senior championship
