= Cranbrook Royals =

Former ice hockey team in Canada

The Cranbrook Royals were a senior men's AAA level ice hockey team that played in the Western International Hockey League from 1965 to 1987.

The Cranbrook Royals won the Allan Cup as senior ice hockey champions of Canada in 1982.
