= Kimberley Dynamiters (WIHL) =

Defunct Canadian senior amateur ice hockey team

- Sport: Ice hockey
- Founded: 1946
- Folded: 1981
- League: Western International Hockey League
- Location: Kimberley, British Columbia
- Championships: 1

The Kimberley Dynamiters are a defunct Senior Amateur ice hockey club that played from 1946-1981 in the Western International Hockey League (WIHL).

During their 18 seasons in the WIHL the Kimberley Dynamiters played 646 games, and compiled a record of 325 wins, 306 losses and 15 ties.

In 1978 the Kimberley Dynamiters won the Allan Cup, defeating the Brantford Alexanders in the best of 7 final series 4 games to 1.
