= Nelson Maple Leafs =

Defunct senior men's ice hockey team in British Columbia, Canada

- Sport: Ice hockey
- Founded: 1932
- Folded: 1987
- League: WIHL (1946-1987); WKL (1932-1941)
- Team history: Ice Flyers (1997-1998); Nighthawks (1996-1997)
- Location: British Columbia, Canada
- Championships: 7

The Nelson Maple Leafs were a senior men's ice hockey team. They won the British Columbia Senior Championship, the Savage Cup, seven times (1937, 1961, 1965, 1967, 1971, 1986, and 1987). They played in, but lost, the 1965 Allan Cup Final.

The Maple Leafs played in the West Kootenay League from 1932-33 through 1940-41 and in 1945-46. They played in the Western International Hockey League from 1946-47 through 1986-87.

Currently, the Nelson Leafs team is a Junior A hockey team, part of the British Columbia Hockey Conference (BCHC).

== Nelson Maple Leafs who played in the NHL ==
- Lloyd Ailsby
- Dale Anderson
- Joe Bell
- George Boothman
- Al "Red" Carr
- Ed Cooper
- Denis Dupéré
- Pat Egan
- Dave Gatherum
- John Harms
- Ed Hatoum - later as head coach
- Fred Hergerts
- Ron Homenuke
- Vic Howe
- Buck Jones
- Brad Larsen
- Mike Laughton
- Bryan Lefley
- Norman "Odie" Lowe
- Connie Madigan
- Jack Mann
- Seth Martin
- Rudy Pilous
- Chuck Rayner
- Garth Rizzuto
- Cliff Schmautz
- Glen Smith
- Spence Tatchell
- Sergei Varlamov
- Pete Vipond
- Eddie Wares
