= Western International Hockey League =

Defunct senior men's ice hockey league in Western Canada and USA

- Classification: Senior
- Sport: Ice hockey
- Founded: 1946
- Folded: 1988
- Replaced by: West Kootenay League
- Region: Western United States; Western Canada
- Most titles: Spokane Flyers (9)

The Western International Hockey League (WIHL) was a senior level ice hockey league that featured teams from the Western United States and Western Canada. It operated from 1946–62 and 1963–88. It grew out of the West Kootenay League, which operated in southeast British Columbia from the 1920s.

== Overview ==
The league had teams in the British Columbian cities of Trail, Nelson, Kimberley, Rossland, Fernie, and Cranbrook; in Spokane, Washington; Calgary, Alberta; Portland, Oregon; and Los Angeles. The league did not operate in 1962–63 while member team the Trail Smoke Eaters competed for and won the world amateur championship overseas.

At various times in the 1950s and 1960s the league had an interlocking schedule with the Okanagan Senior League and the Alberta Senior Hockey League. It also played matches against the Pacific Hockey League in 1978–79.

In an era when there were fewer NHL and minor professional teams and leagues in North America, winning the Allan Cup was a difficult challenge and the national championship trophy was a coveted prize. The WIHL, along with other highly competitive senior leagues across Canada (with member teams located in the US as well), was considered among the best amateur hockey in North America. Even until the 1980s, the caliber of play was excellent and many former top CHL, junior A, university and pro level players went on to compete for WIHL teams. The WIHL champions would be considered one of the top non-professional teams in North America each year.

The champions of the WIHL received the Shore-Montgomery Trophy, donated by movie stars Dinah Shore and George Montgomery in 1946. It is now on display in the Trail Sports Hall of Memories.

WIHL teams that went on to win the Allan Cup include the Trail Smoke Eaters (1961–62), Spokane Jets (1969–70, 1971–72), Spokane Flyers (1975–76, 1979–80), Kimberley Dynamiters (1977–78), and Cranbrook Royals (1981–82).

== Teams ==
- Calgary Stampeders (1978–79)
- Cranbrook Royals (1965–88)
- Elk Valley Blazers (1979–88)
- Kimberley Dynamiters (1946–81)
- Los Angeles Ramblers (1946–47)
- Nelson Maple Leafs (1946–62, 1963–87)
- Portland Buckaroos (1974–75)
- Rossland Warriors (1956–67)
- Spokane Spartans (1946–48)
- Spokane Flyers (first) (1948–58)
- Spokane Flyers (second) (1974–78, 1979–80)
- Spokane Jets (1963–74)
- Spokane Chiefs (1982–1985)
- Trail Smoke Eaters (1946–62, 1963–84, 1985–87)

== Regular season champions ==
- 1946–47 Kimberley Dynamiters
- 1947–48 Trail Smoke Eaters
- 1948–49 Spokane Flyers (league title)
- 1949–50 Spokane Flyers (league title)
- 1950–51 Trail Smoke Eaters
- 1951–52 Trail Smoke Eaters
- 1952–53 Spokane Flyers
- 1953–54 Nelson Maple Leafs
- 1954–55 Kimberley Dynamiters
- 1955–56 Spokane Flyers
- 1956–57 Spokane Flyers
- 1957–58 Rossland Warriors
- 1958–59 Nelson Maple Leafs
- 1959–60 Trail Smoke Eaters
- 1960–61 Nelson Maple Leafs
- 1961–62 Trail Smoke Eaters (won 1962 Allan Cup)
- 1963–64 Kimberley Dynamiters
- 1964–65 Nelson Maple Leafs
- 1965–66 Kimberley Dynamiters
- 1966–67 Nelson Maple Leafs
- 1967–68 Spokane Jets
- 1968–69 Spokane Jets
- 1969–70 Spokane Jets (won 1970 Allan Cup)
- 1970–71 Nelson Maple Leafs
- 1971–72 Spokane Jets (won 1972 Allan Cup)
- 1972–73 Spokane Jets
- 1973–74 Cranbrook Royals
- 1974–75 Spokane Flyers
- 1975–76 Spokane Flyers (won 1976 Allan Cup)
- 1976–77 Spokane Flyers
- 1977–78 Kimberley Dynamiters (won 1978 Allan Cup)
- 1978–79 Trail Smoke Eaters
- 1979–80 Spokane Flyers (won 1980 Allan Cup)
- 1980–81 Kimberley Dynamiters
- 1981–82 Cranbrook Royals (won 1982 Allan Cup)
- 1982–83 Trail Smoke Eaters
- 1983–84 Spokane Chiefs
- 1984–85 Spokane Chiefs
- 1985–86 Nelson Maple Leafs
- 1986–87 Nelson Maple Leafs
- 1987–88 Elk Valley Blazers

Note: In 1948–49 and 1949–50 the Trail Smoke Eaters advanced to the British Columbia playoffs because Spokane was not eligible for the Allan Cup.

== See also ==
- List of WIHL seasons
