= 1955–56 WIHL season =

North American ice hockey season

1955–56 was the tenth season of the Western International Hockey League.

== Season recap ==
Spokane's Flyers, under the capable eye of coach Roy McBride, won the Dinah Shore-George Montgomery Trophy, emblematic of hockey supremacy of the WIHL, in 1955-56.

The Flyers enjoyed a good season and were in complete control of the league from the start of the hockey campaign, finished six points in front of the second place Nelson Maple Leafs. The WIHL returned to a balanced schedule, with each club playing 50 games, including interlocking games with the strong Okanagan Senior Hockey League.

Coach Roy McBride received a big break, when the Kamloops Elks, and coach Kevin "Crusher" Conway, released goalie Johnny Sofiak. John Panagrot, Flyers regular netminder, up and quit the club, and the Flyers were quick in signing Sofiak. Panagrot played real well in the 24 games he played, earning two shutouts. Sofiak performed in the remaining 26 Flyer contests, picking up one shutout. Earl Betker, who had the league's best goal average, despite the fact the Dynamiters finished deep in the cellar, registered the league's only other shutout.

The Flyers not only dominated the league with a record of 30 wins, against 20 defeats—but had the best road record of eleven victories, and only lost six games at home in the (Spokane) Coliseum. Trail's Smoke Eaters won three games in Spokane, while the Kimberley Dynamiters failed to win a single game in the Coliseum, out of seven meetings.

The Flyers locked horns with the Kimberley Dynamiters in one set of the WIHL semi-finals, and had easy pickings, winning four games to one. Trail's Smoke Eaters pulled off the biggest upset of the season by eliminating the second place Nelson Maple Leafs in five games. Spokane won the right to represent the WIHL in the Savage Cup playdowns, by beating the Smoke Eaters in the final.

The Vernon Canadians, who had an easy time in capturing the Okanagan League title, defeated the Flyers for the British Columbia championship and went all the way, and won the Allan Cup.

Hal Gordon was a standout in the Canadians' net, and had a powerhouse defence in Orval Lavell, Willie Schmidt, Don McLeod and Tom Stecyk. Sherman Blair, George Agar and Art Hart formed Vernon's number one line, with Odie Lowe playing centre on another line with Frank King and Merv Bidoski. Johnny Harms, Art Davison, Don Jakes and Walt Trentini, Vernon's only local product, rounded out the team. Vernon's Canadians, coached by George Agar, were the toast of the Okanagan valley.

The Flyers had plenty of scoring power in the regular season play, and managed to have five players in the top ten scoring parade. Lee Hyssop of the Nelson Maple Leafs, was the WIHL scoring king, with 94 points; with Spokane's Frank Kubasek, a former pro and a Blairmore (Crowsnet) boy, runner up with 83 points. Other Flyers who managed to score at a fast clip were Art Jones with 44; Lorne Nadeau with 39; Kubasek, 38; Gino Rozzini, 25; Carl Cirullo, 24; Jack Miller, 21; Bruno Pasqualotto, 20; and Red Tilson, 19.

Tom Hodges, Spokane's young defenceman, had to take a back seat in the penalty race. He picked up 106 minutes in fines, far behind the league's bad man, "Terrible" Ted Leboida of the Dynamiters' 165 minutes. Only two other players received over 100 minutes in penalties; Gordon Andre of Kimberley, with 163 minutes, and Joe Conn of the Trail Smoke Eaters, with 105 minutes.

Spokane's lineup in 1955-56: John Sofiak, John Panagrot (Goal); Ralph Luke, Tom Hodges, Cy Whiteside, Dan McDougald, Jack Lancien (Defence); Frank Kubasek, Art Jones, Jack Miller, Gino Rozzini, Bruno Pasqualotto, Carl Cirullo, Doug Toole, Lorne Nadeau, Dave Gordichuk and Hugh Scott.

Lee Hyssop, who played most of his minor hockey in Kimberley, paced the Nelson Maple Leafs to a second-place finish, with a record of 26 wins and two ties, against 22 defeats. The slick Leaf forward had little trouble in winning the scoring crown with 94 points, made up of 33 goals and a league high of 61 assists. Coach Chuck Rayner had his Leafs flying high late in the season, but ran up against a rejuvenated Trail team in their semi-final series; and bowed out in the fifth game of the best-of-seven affair. The Leafs had little trouble handling the Smoke Eaters in regular season play, winning nine of their fourteen meetings, and with five of their victories coming right in Trail's Cominco Arena.

The Maple Leafs introduced their rookie netminder, Gus Adams, who performed in 49 games for the Leafs and had a goal average of 4.90. Fritz Koehle was Nelson's second leading point getter with 60 points, made up of 29 goals and 31 assists. Bud Andrews, who saw action both with Trail and Nelson, paced the league in the hat trick division, with four three-goal performances to his credit. Andrews finished with 34 goals, Herb Jeffrey, 27; Joe Bell, 19; Wendy Keller, 19; and Red Koehle, 15. What had to be a big disappointment for the Leafs was the showing of Vic Howe, the 25-year-old brother of Detroit Red Wings's Gordie Howe. The ex-pro from Saskatoon was expected to give the Leafs the much needed scoring punch, but only managed ten goals in 29 games.

Jimmy Morris had a frustrating season as coach of the Trail Smoke Eaters, and it wasn't until playoff time did they manage to get rolling. The Smokies had the horses to win it all, but ran into salary disputes, which caused trouble in the Smokies' quarters. In the playoffs they shook hands and let bygones be bygones, and made short order of the Leafs, before bowing out to Spokane in the WIHL finals. The Smokies had a record of 24 wins, one tie and 25 losses for 49 points, good for a third-place finish.

Seth Martin and Reno Zanier shared the Smokies goaltending duties, with Martin having a goal average of 4.69, compared to Zanier's 5.36. The Smoke Eaters played well away from home, winning nine games, and had the best record against the Okanagan League, winning five of their eight games. Mike Shabaga's 72 points was high in the Smokies scoring column with 25 goals and 47 assists. Norm Lenardon was right on Shabaga's heels with 70 points, 32 of them goals. Gerry Penner had 30 goals, Bobby Kromm, 22; Frank Turik, 20; Mort Sapplywy, 20; and Ray Demore, 19.

The Kimberley Dynamiters occupied the basement suite most of the season, with a record of 18 wins, two ties and 30 losses, for 38 points.

Norm Larsen resigned as coach of the Dynamiters late in the season, with Johnny Achtzener moving up from the general manager's post to take over the reins. Larsen, despite the fact he had a knee injury, continued on as a player. The Dynamiters managed to finish with four players right up in the thick of the scoring parade. Cal Hockley held down third spot with 81 points; Buzz Mellor picked up 77 points, and Larsen and Claudie Bell 72 points apiece. Hockley had 37 goals, Mellor, 38; Larsen, 35; Bell, 30; and Gerry Barre 24. The Dynamiters potent line of Hockley, Mellor and Bell paced the league in goals, collecting 103; with Spokane's powerful trio of Kubasek, Nadeau and Miller close behind with 98 goals. Kimberley did top the league in one department, and that was in penalties. They served a total of 619 minutes in penalties, and to break it down, they played a man short for over ten full games. Ted Lebodia was the loop's badman with 165 minutes in fines; with Andre not far behind with 163 minutes. During league play a total of 32 major penalties were dished out, with Andre picking up seven of them, and Lebodia four.

The Dynamiters had a disastrous road record, winning only two games on foreign ice all season. They played three of their home games on Cranbrook ice, and managed to win all three; and drew excellent crowds.

Gordon "Moe" Young was the playing coach of the Kelowna Packers in 1955-56, after serving Trail for four seasons, two of them as coach.

The WIHL hired two outside (non-BCAHA officials) referees to handle games in 1955-56. George Cullen, who officiated football in the Western International Football Union at Regina, Saskatchewan, was referee-in-chief; with Tommy Dunn his assistant. It was a costly experience and lasted only one year.

Bill Hyrciuk was the Kamloops Elks leading scorer, and managed two goals and four assists over the Dynamiters in Kimberley.

In 1955-56 the Dynamiters' swing through the Okanagan League, with stops at Kamloops, Vernon, Kelowna and Penticton, cost the club $1,950, which included transportation, hotels, meals and lost-time wages. That is about $27,000 today.

Since the Savage Cup, emblematic of the senior hockey championship of B.C., was first played for in 1912-13, Trail has won the cup 16 times, Kimberley eight, Nelson five and Spokane five.

== Standings ==
- Spokane Flyers 30-20-0-60
- Nelson Maple Leafs 26-22-2-54
- Trail Smoke Eaters 24-25-1-49
- Kimberley Dynamiters 19-30-1-39

== Semi finals ==
Best of 7

- Spokane 5 Kimberley 1
- Spokane 6 Kimberley 5
- Kimberley 4 Spokane 1
- Spokane 3 Kimberley 0
- Spokane 3 Kimberley 1

Spokane Flyers beat Kimberley Dynamiters 4 wins to 1.

- Trail 6 Nelson 0
- Trail 5 Nelson 1
- Nelson 2 Trail 1
- Trail 6 Nelson 1
- Trail 3 Nelson 1

Trail Smoke Eaters beat Nelson Maple Leafs 4 wins to 1.

== Final ==
Best of 7

- Spokane 7 Trail 2
- Spokane 6 Trail 5
- Spokane 3 Trail 2
- Trail 8 Spokane 7
- Spokane 7 Trail 5

Spokane Flyers beat Trail Smoke Eaters 4 wins to 1.

Spokane Flyers advanced to the 1955-56 British Columbia Senior Playoffs.
