= Norman Lowe =

Canadian ice hockey player (1928–2021)

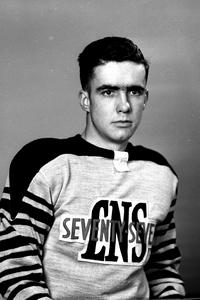
- Odie Lowe pictured c. 1946
- Born: April 15, 1928 Winnipeg, Manitoba, Canada
- Died: June 29, 2021 (aged 93) Vernon, British Columbia, Canada
- Height: 5 ft 8 in (173 cm)
- Weight: 140 lb (64 kg; 10 st 0 lb)
- Position: Centre
- Shot: Right
- Played for: New York Rangers
- Playing career: 1947–1961

Norman Ewart "Odie" Lowe (April 15, 1928 – June 29, 2021) was a Canadian professional ice hockey player who played three games in the National Hockey League with the New York Rangers during the 1949–50 season. The rest of his career, which lasted from 1947 to 1961, was spent in various minor and senior leagues. He died on June 29, 2021.

== Career statistics ==
=== Regular season and playoffs ===
| | | | Regular season | | | | | Playoffs |
| Season | Team | League | GP | G | A | Pts | PIM | GP | G | A | Pts | PIM |
|---|---|---|---|---|---|---|---|---|---|---|---|---|
| 1945–46 | Winnipeg Rangers | MJHL | 10 | 6 | 5 | 11 | 16 | 2 | 1 | 0 | 1 | 2 |
| 1946–47 | Lethbridge Native Sons | AJHL | 11 | 10 | 22 | 32 | 8 | 3 | 5 | 7 | 12 | 4 |
| 1946–47 | Lethbridge Maple Leafs | WCSHL | 1 | 1 | 1 | 2 | 0 | — | — | — | — | — |
| 1947–48 | Winnipeg Canadiens | MJHL | 24 | 23 | 28 | 51 | 44 | 6 | 2 | 5 | 7 | 10 |
| 1948–49 | New York Rovers | QSHL | 62 | 27 | 39 | 66 | 29 | — | — | — | — | — |
| 1949–50 | New York Rangers | NHL | 3 | 1 | 1 | 2 | 0 | — | — | — | — | — |
| 1949–50 | New York Rovers | EAHL | 44 | 17 | 36 | 53 | 18 | 12 | 7 | 8 | 15 | 6 |
| 1950–51 | St. Paul Saints | USHL | 63 | 12 | 24 | 36 | 16 | 4 | 0 | 0 | 0 | 2 |
| 1951–52 | St. Paul Saints | AAHL | 39 | 33 | 45 | 78 | 32 | — | — | — | — | — |
| 1952–53 | Nelson Maple Leafs | WIHL | 45 | 24 | 34 | 58 | 22 | — | — | — | — | — |
| 1952–53 | Winnipeg Maroons | Al-Cup | — | — | — | — | — | 7 | 2 | 5 | 7 | 2 |
| 1953–54 | Winnipeg Maroons | Exhib | — | — | — | — | — | — | — | — | — | — |
| 1953–54 | Winnipeg Maroons | Al-Cup | — | — | — | — | — | 23 | 14 | 21 | 35 | 18 |
| 1954–55 | Vernon Canadiens | OSHL | 54 | 17 | 28 | 45 | 28 | 5 | 2 | 4 | 6 | 0 |
| 1954–55 | Vernon Vipers | Al-Cup | — | — | — | — | — | 17 | 11 | 14 | 25 | 6 |
| 1955–56 | Vernon Canadiens | OSHL | 56 | 43 | 48 | 91 | 21 | 8 | 5 | 7 | 12 | 0 |
| 1955–56 | Vernon Vipers | Al-Cup | — | — | — | — | — | 16 | 7 | 18 | 25 | 8 |
| 1956–57 | Vernon Canadiens | OSHL | 54 | 61 | 53 | 114 | 52 | 12 | 9 | 7 | 16 | 6 |
| 1957–58 | Vernon Canadiens | OSHL | 54 | 25 | 28 | 53 | 54 | 8 | 6 | 2 | 8 | 6 |
| 1958–59 | Vernon Canadiens | OSHL | 54 | 38 | 33 | 71 | 28 | 17 | 3 | 8 | 11 | 8 |
| 1959–60 | Vernon Canadiens | OSHL | 45 | 35 | 44 | 79 | 16 | 13 | 13 | 8 | 21 | 2 |
| 1960–61 | Vernon Canadiens | OSHL | 44 | 36 | 50 | 86 | 20 | 5 | 6 | 6 | 12 | 2 |
| OSHL totals | | | 361 | 255 | 284 | 539 | 219 | 68 | 44 | 42 | 86 | 24 |
| NHL totals | | | 3 | 1 | 1 | 2 | 0 | — | — | — | — | — |
