= Lionel Fleury =

Canadian ice hockey administrator (1912–1997)

- Born: December 25, 1912; Quebec City, Quebec, Canada
- Died: July 12, 1997 (aged 84); Quebec City, Quebec, Canada
- Occupation: Civil servant
- Known for: Canadian Amateur Hockey Association and Quebec Amateur Hockey Association president
- Awards: Hockey Québec Hall of Fame; Canadian Centennial Medal

Lionel Fleury (December 25, 1912 – July 12, 1997) was a Canadian ice hockey administrator who served as president of the Canadian Amateur Hockey Association from 1964 to 1966. Under his leadership, the Canada men's national ice hockey team transitioned from student athletes coached by Father David Bauer into a year-round national team program. Fleury welcomed the Newfoundland Amateur Hockey Association as a new branch member of the national association in 1966, and changed the format of the Memorial Cup playoffs in Eastern Canada from an elimination bracket into a round-robin format to reduce travel costs and address concerns of imbalanced competition. He sought an end to the National Hockey League system of sponsoring amateur teams by replacing it with a draft of players who had graduated from junior ice hockey, and negotiated for a new agreement that was realized after his term as president concluded.

Fleury was a lifelong resident of Quebec City where he organized minor ice hockey leagues, established the Quebec City District Minor Hockey Association, and chaired the city's parks and playgrounds association. He later served as president of the Quebec Amateur Hockey Association and oversaw the establishment of a Quebec Junior Hockey League composed of local talent that operated without seeking financial assistance from professional leagues. As a spokesperson for sports associations in Quebec, he appealed for the Government of Canada to co-ordinate amateur sports nationally, and was named to the committee which organized the inaugural Canada Games. Fleury was recognized for his contributions to sport with the Canadian Centennial Medal in 1967, and was inducted into the inaugural class of the Hockey Québec Hall of Fame in 1991.

== Early life and Quebec hockey ==
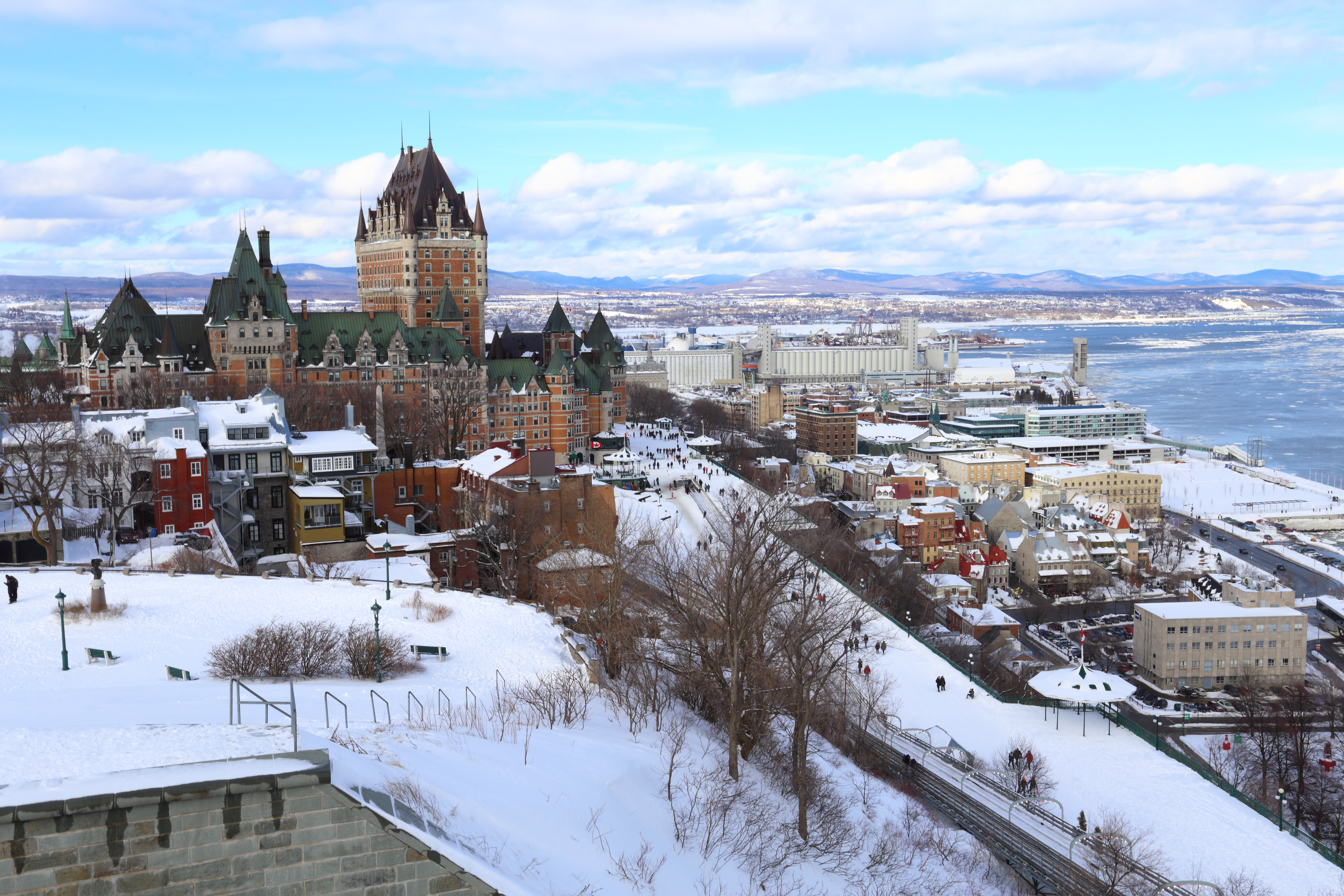
Quebec City in winter

Lionel Fleury was born in Quebec City on December 25, 1912. He was involved in ice hockey at an early age, and later became a referee, coach and manager in junior ice hockey. During the Great Depression, he assisted in founding the first public recreational facility in the Saint-Sacrement neighbourhood of Quebec City, organized local minor ice hockey leagues, then established the Quebec City District Minor Hockey Association. He served as a vice-president of the Quebec Amateur Hockey Association (QAHA) from 1940 to 1955, representing the Quebec City district.

The QAHA sought a more equal distribution of talent among teams in the Quebec Senior Hockey League in 1942, and passed a resolution which limited teams to signing no more than four players who had been in the National Hockey League (NHL) during the previous season. Fleury gained the QAHA's approval to seek a similar rule for all of Canada, and to welcome teams of servicemen in the Canadian Armed Forces into the Quebec's leagues without requiring registration fees.

Fleury was president of the four-team Quebec Junior Hockey League during the 1954–55 season. The Quebec Frontenacs had been invited to join the Ontario Hockey Association's junior division, but sought to remain in the Quebec league and play an interlocking schedule which generated more attendance at home games versus the Ontario teams. The other teams in Quebec were opposed to playing teams from Ontario, and Fleury reached an agreement for a schedule among the four teams in Quebec. Two months later, the Jonquière Marquis suspended operations due to the imbalance of talent in the league and financial issues. After Quebec senator Donat Raymond donated the Wilfrid Laurier Trophy as a challenge cup to create more interest in junior ice hockey in Quebec and Ontario, Fleury redrew the schedule with the remaining three teams in the playoffs. The Quebec Junior Hockey League folded after the season.

The registration of minor hockey players in Quebec City was criticized by alderman Gaston Flibotte in January 1955, who felt that municipally funded recreational facilities and programs should not be regimented by the QAHA. He claimed that in order to gain access to the city's rinks, six-year-olds were required to sign QAHA registration cards which tied them to the association for five years, and that higher-ranked players were given preferential treatment by the QAHA. Fleury was chairman of the city's parks and playgrounds association at the time, and felt that the QAHA was giving children a place to play recreational hockey and denied any intentions to produce professional athletes.

=== QAHA president ===
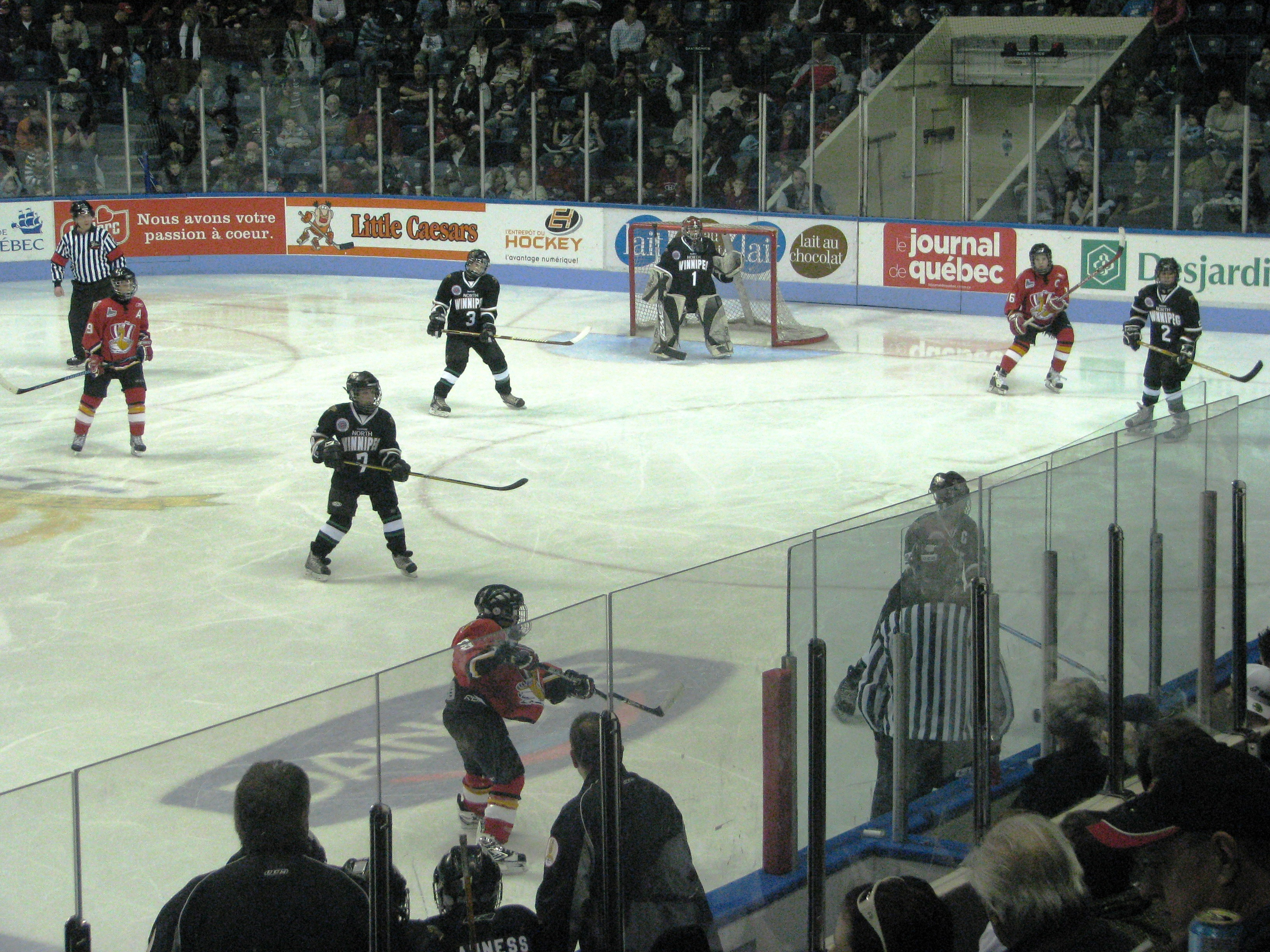
Quebec International Pee-Wee Hockey Tournament game action

Fleury was elected president of the QAHA to succeed Robert Lebel in June 1955, and was the first person to live outside of Greater Montreal to hold the position.

Fleury planned to replace the Quebec Junior Hockey League with a new league composed of local talent on teams that operated at a lower level of junior hockey, and be purely amateur without seeking financial assistance from the NHL. The new league grew as two seasons passed, but its teams were unable to compete at same level as the Montreal Junior Canadiens or teams in the Ontario Hockey Association. The QAHA contended those teams were operating on a semi-professional basis since they paid a weekly stipend to their players and were too strong of competition in the Memorial Cup playoffs for the Canadian junior championship. In January 1957, the QAHA reached an agreement with the Maritime Amateur Hockey Association and the Ottawa and District Amateur Hockey Association to establish a new junior championship at a lower level than the Memorial Cup. They invited teams from the Northern Ontario Hockey Association and Western Canada to join, then presented the plan for approval by the Canadian Amateur Hockey Association (CAHA). The CAHA voted instead to allow its weaker branches to strengthen their championship teams by adding up to six players in the Memorial Cup playoffs.

The Confederation of Recreation in Quebec City chose to operate independently and leave the jurisdiction of the QAHA in 1959, due to continued disputes on the registration and release of players in minor hockey. The QAHA regained a presence in the city after it gave approval to establish the Quebec International Pee-Wee Hockey Tournament in 1960, which operated as a minor hockey event during the Quebec Winter Carnival. After five years as president, Fleury was succeeded by Clyde McCarthy in 1960.

== Canadian Amateur Hockey Association ==
=== Second vice-president ===
Fleury was elected second vice-president of the CAHA on May 28, 1960, and served two one-year terms. During this time, the CAHA sought better financial arrangements for international ice hockey competitions to assist in financing the Canada men's national ice hockey team, and that the reigning Allan Cup champion team was the best choice to represent Canada. Fleury served as chairman of the CAHA's Minor Hockey Week In Canada in 1961 and 1962. He sought to have parents more involved, felt that it was important to keep youths involved in sports for the physical benefits, and that the event had become "an accepted and important part of the national sports program".

Fleury was the spokesman for amateur sports associations in Quebec which appealed to member of parliament Jacques Flynn for the co-ordination of amateur sports in Canada. Fleury presented a brief to Flynn in January 196, that included eight recommendations as "constructive suggestions for the renovation of athletics in Canada".

List of recommendations:

1. Appointment of a national sports commissioner to co-ordinate sports activities in Canada and be a liaison to the federal government
2. Establish a National Sports Council composed of leaders from the national amateur sports associations to advise the commissioner and promote co-operation
3. Establish inter-provincial sports competitions to stimulate growth in amateur sport in Canada
4. Establish a national medical research facility to specialize in the benefits of exercise in sports
5. Appointment of government-funded technical instructors to teach training methods to athletes and to study the financial needs of amateur sports groups
6. Grant access to military sports venues due to the lack of facilities for amateur athletes
7. Establish a government-funded Canada men's national ice hockey team
8. Establish a system of ranking and awards for national athletes to stimulate interest in competitions

=== First vice-president ===
The Memorial Cup was the championship trophy for amateur junior ice hockey overseen by the CAHA.

Fleury was elected first vice-president in May 1962, and served two one-year terms. The CAHA general meeting in 1962 debated alternate methods of selecting the Canadian national team instead of sending the reigning Allan Cup champion to international events. Later in August, the CAHA approved a proposal by Father David Bauer to establish a team of student athletes to train at the University of British Columbia to form the core of the Canadian national team. Fleury made plans for an international tournament to be hosted in Canada, but instead exhibition tours were scheduled and the Swedish national team made its debut in Canada in December 1963. He accompanied the 1963 Allan Cup champion Windsor Bulldogs on a European exhibition tour, and based on the results he felt that the Soviet national team would be the strongest in ice hockey at the 1964 Winter Olympics.

Fleury oversaw the 1963 Memorial Cup playoffs in Eastern Canada, when the junior champions from Quebec and the Maritimes declined to participate and complained that the national deadlines did not allow adequate time to decide their leagues' champions. The CAHA was concerned about the quality of Memorial Cup competition due to the rapid expansion in junior ice hockey, and named Fleury chairman of a committee to investigate the imbalance the competition in Eastern Canada and find a solution to include all branches of the CAHA in the national playoffs. He opted to change the format of the Memorial Cup playoffs from an elimination bracket into a round-robin format to reduce travel costs.

Fleury oversaw the 1964 Memorial Cup playoffs in Eastern Canada, and scheduled a three-team round-robin series for the champions of the QAHA, the Ottawa and District Amateur Hockey Association, and the Maritime Amateur Hockey Association. After the Summerside Legionnaires lost their first two games by scores of 9–1 and 15–0, Fleury felt there was no point in continuing the series. The team withdrew but protested that they should have been allowed to play, and demanded money to cover their travel expenses to Montreal for the series.

=== President ===
==== First term ====
Fleury was elected president to succeed Art Potter, during the 50th annual general meeting of the CAHA on May 22, 1964. The CAHA was criticized at the time for neglecting minor hockey concerns, and responded by instructing its branches to begin overseeing tournaments for players under age 10 by implementing standard conditions which included limits on travel distance and the number of games per day.

The CAHA wanted to end the NHL system of sponsoring junior hockey teams and replace it with an NHL draft of players who had graduated from junior hockey. The CAHA felt that the current system concentrated talent on a small number of teams and sought for the NHL to spread out that money it invested equally among the junior leagues and branches in Canada. Fleury wanted a junior-aged player to complete an education, rather than be encouraged to quit schooling to focus on playing hockey. In December 1964, he presented the CAHA's proposal to the NHL for a new draft system which would allow players remain in junior hockey until age 20 instead of the NHL obtaining the player's rights at age 18.

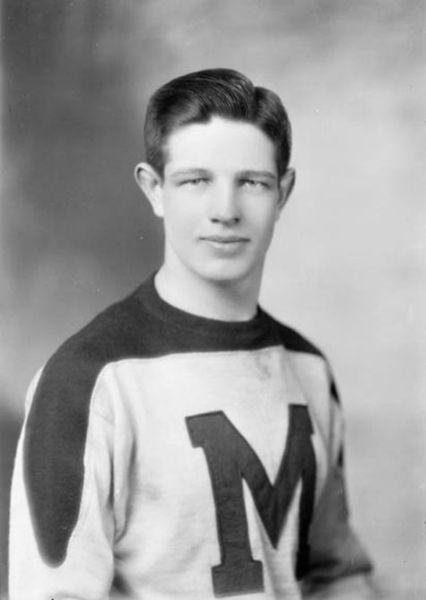
David Bauer

The Canadian national team placed fourth at the 1964 Winter Olympics. The CAHA chose to establish a permanent Canadian national team based in Winnipeg, then merged players from the Olympics into the 1964 Allan Cup champions Winnipeg Maroons and added the best available players from across Canada. By the following February, the national team roster had grown to 33 players to accommodate those who had schooling and employment commitments. The CAHA divided the team into two groups and scheduled exhibition tours for both groups in advance of the 1965 World Championships, and Fleury travelled to Finland with the second group. After Canada failed to win the 1965 World Championships, Fleury agreed with a recommendation by David Bauer to skip the 1966 World Championships to regroup and give the players more time to develop as a team.

The CAHA had never hosted an Ice Hockey World Championships, and Fleury felt that a bid for the A-division of the 1967 World Championships to coincide with the Canadian Centennial would be approved. The International Ice Hockey Federation (IIHF) voted for the Austrian bid which included all divisions. Fleury later revealed that the CAHA had limited its bid to the top five countries of the A-division to exclude the East Germany national team, to avoid embarrassing the Government of Canada due to travel visa issues for East Germany that had occurred at the 1962 World Championships hosted in the United States. He also explained that the decision not to host the B-division was not made due to its perceived lack of profitability, but rather it was political since the CAHA sought to restrict which countries participated in the A-division.

At the same time the IIHF was deciding on the host location of the 1967 World Championships, the Austrian Ice Hockey Association voiced its opposition to former NHL player Larry Regan operating a hockey school in Austria. The IIHF also approved a regulation which banned European rinks from hosting both professional players and IIHF events. Fleury felt that European countries were against the presence of North American professionals due to concerns of the best European players being lured away. Despite a statement from the Austria ambassador to Canada that no such ban existed, Fleury noted that the IIHF had supported the ban with little discussion when it was proposed by the Austrian Ice Hockey Association president Walter Wasservogel.

==== Second term ====
Fleury was re-elected president in May 1965, and focused that year's general meeting on improvement to Canada's national team. The CAHA continued the national team program based in Winnipeg, and Fleury expected to begin assembling players in September and keep them together for the winter to prepare for the 1966 World Championships. He also sought for the players to be fully amateur instead of former professionals, and for them to be educated and or employed in Winnipeg. Jackie McLeod was hired to become the team's full-time coach on a recommendation from David Bauer.

Saskatchewan Junior Hockey League commissioner Frank Boucher was opposed to his league's strongest players being approached to play on the national team while they were still eligible for junior hockey, and he accused the CAHA of raiding the league. Fleury felt that talking to juniors was acceptable, that no regulations had been broken, and did not blame any player for wanting to represent his country while continuing a university education. Fleury dismissed continued complaints from Saskatchewan that Fran Huck had joined the national team, and was opposed to any suggestion for the NHL to have more influence in amateur hockey and assume control of the national team.

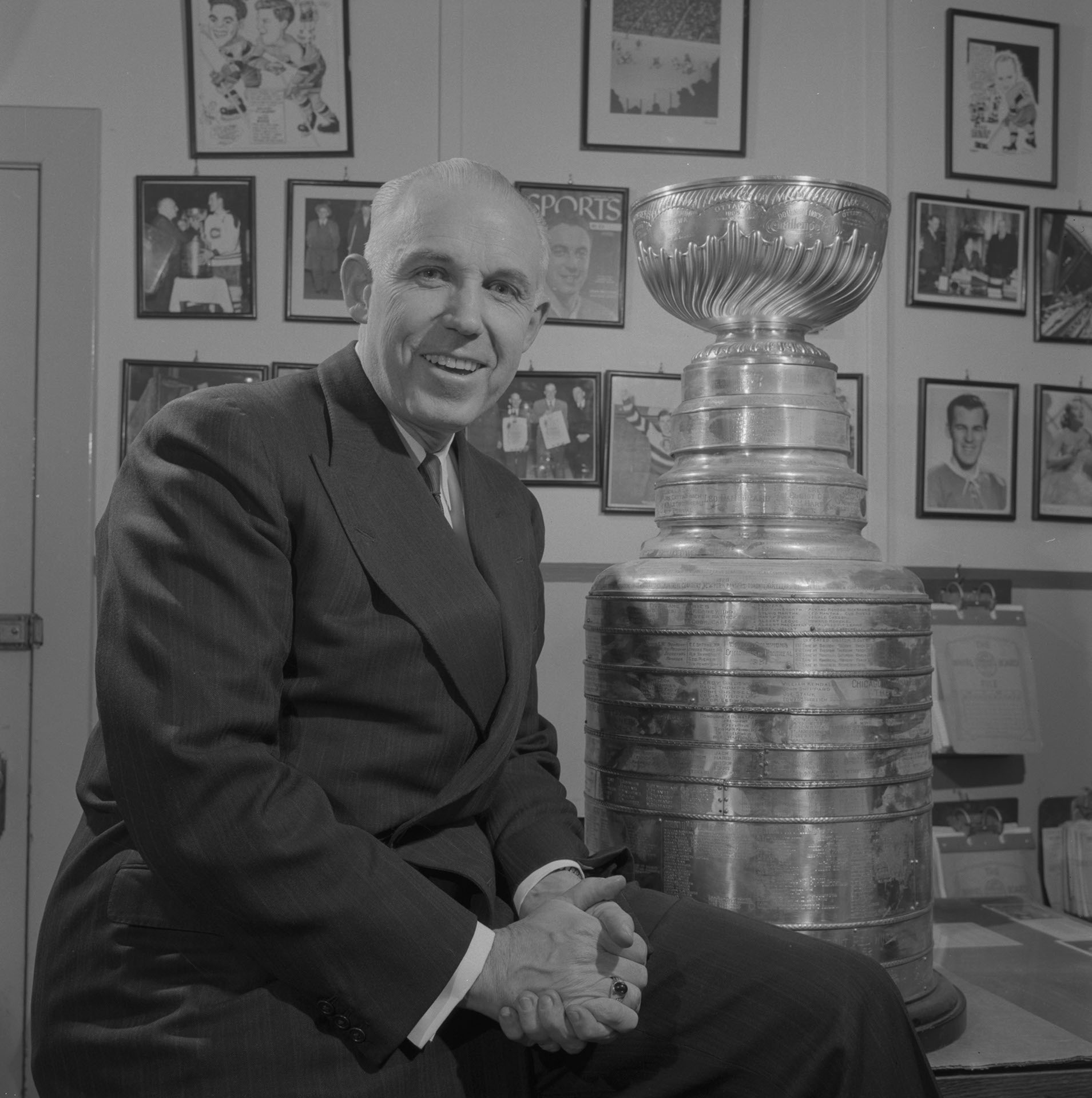
Clarence Campbell

Fleury travelled with the national team to the 1966 World Championships in Ljubljana, and felt that the calibre of officiating was below the expected standard after a loss to the Czechoslovak national team in which Canada was the more-penalized team. The Canadian players wanted to withdraw from the World Championships in protest of the officiating; but reconsidered after a meeting with David Bauer and Fleury, and to avoid a national embarrassment and sanctions against the team.

The CAHA renewed its call to end the direct sponsorship of junior hockey and to establish a universal draft of players. Fleury felt that an end to sponsorship would interest more people in operating a junior team, and asked the NHL to terminate the existing professional-agreement rather than letting it in expire in 1968. In an effort to force the discussion and cover its expenses, the CAHA kept 15 per cent of the profits from Allan Cup and Memorial Cup playoffs, instead of the 10 per cent stipulated in the agreement. NHL president Clarence Campbell declined to terminate the agreement since 95 per cent of NHL players were produced by sponsored junior teams. The NHL felt that a draft of players might be viable but wanted to draft players at a younger age than 20, and wanted to continue making payments directly to amateur teams instead of the CAHA dispersing funds as it saw fit.

Fleury was hospitalized due to a recurring heart condition prior to the 1966 CAHA general meeting, but chose to travel to the meeting in Montreal against his doctor's orders. Fleury ended fifteen years of unsuccessful negotiations to incorporate the Province of Newfoundland into the CAHA, when he reached an agreement with Don Johnson for the Newfoundland Amateur Hockey Association to become a branch member. At the same time, the CAHA accepted the Canadian Interuniversity Athletics Union as a new associate member. Fleury and fellow CAHA executives drafted a proposal to resolve the differences with the NHL. The CAHA voted to accept the draft proposal as he missed the remainder of the meetings confined to his hotel room to rest and recuperate.

=== Later hockey career ===
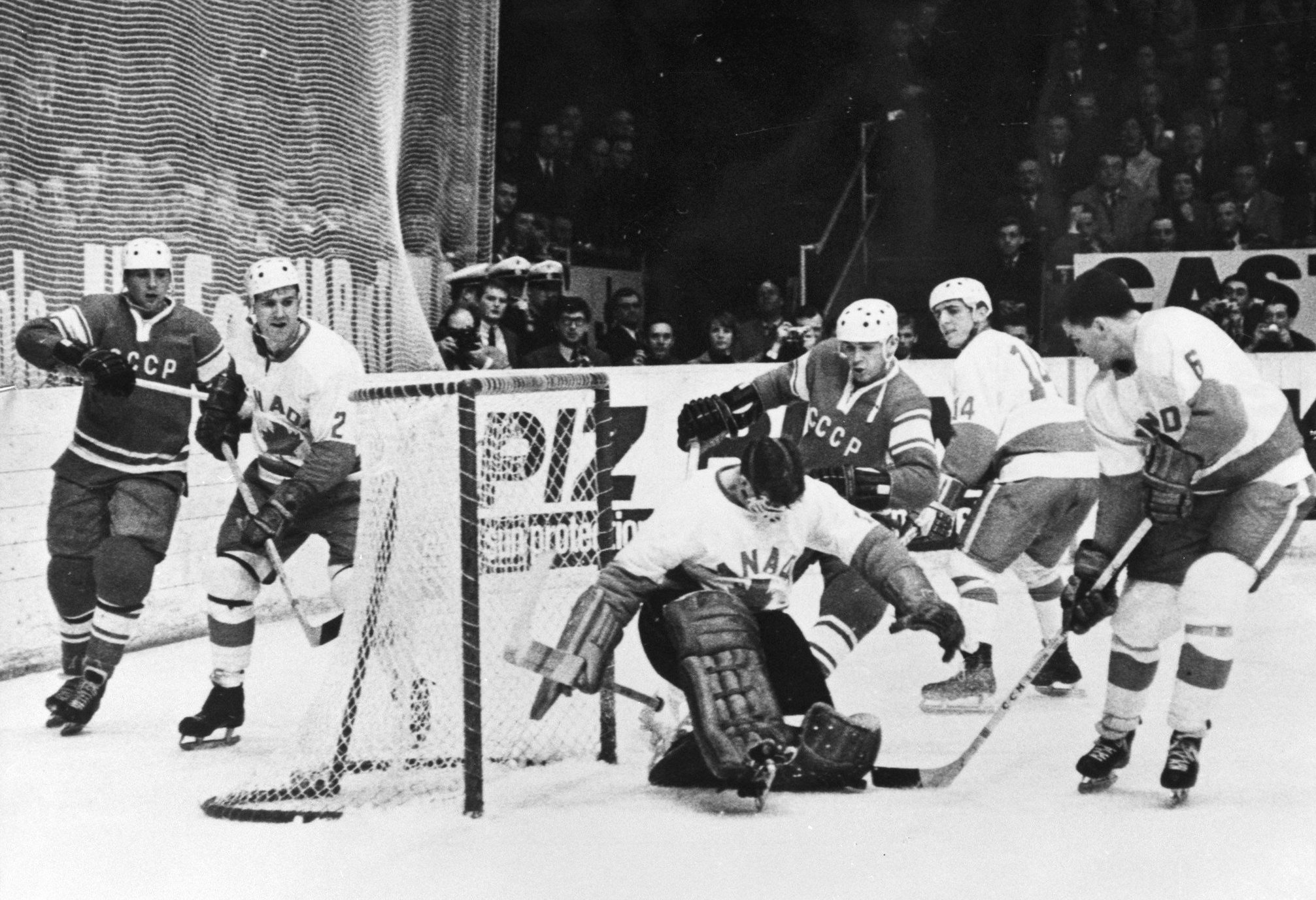
Canada versus the Soviet Union at the 1967 Ice Hockey World Championships

Fred Page succeeded Fleury as the CAHA president. A new five-year agreement with the NHL was announced in August 1966. It included the end of direct sponsorship of junior teams, allowed players who graduated from junior hockey to be eligible for the NHL Amateur Draft, and allowed the CAHA to distribute development fees paid by the NHL for the drafted players. Fleury returned to the QAHA executive when he was elected a vice-president in September 1966. He was also named to the committee for organizing the inaugural Canada Games hosted during winter in Quebec City in 1967.

The CAHA approved the establishment of a second Canadian national team based in Ottawa, in addition to the existing Winnipeg-based team. The CAHA wanted to have more players with international experience in advance of the 1968 Winter Olympics, and named Fleury chairman of the committee to oversee the Ottawa-based national team. In 1967, he sat on the CAHA committee to decide which cities in Canada would host games for the 1970 World Championships. Winnipeg and Montreal were chosen, and Fleury defended the choice of Montreal by stating its bid was the best of the Eastern Canadian cities, compared to Toronto, Ottawa, or Quebec City.

At the 1967 CAHA general meeting, QAHA president Henry Crochetiere stated that the Quebec sovereignty movement was hurting minor hockey in Quebec since organizations had broken away due to resentment of being governed by a primarily English-speaking body. The rival Quebec Amateur Hockey Federation claimed 70,000 registrants in minor hockey and sought to become the recognized amateur hockey body instead of the QAHA which had 60,000 registrants in all age groups combined. Fleury and CAHA executives met with the rival organizations in July 1968, in an attempt to end the schism in Quebec. They reached an agreement that saw changes made to the QAHA constitution to unite the organizations and give a greater voice to all age groups.

== Personal life ==
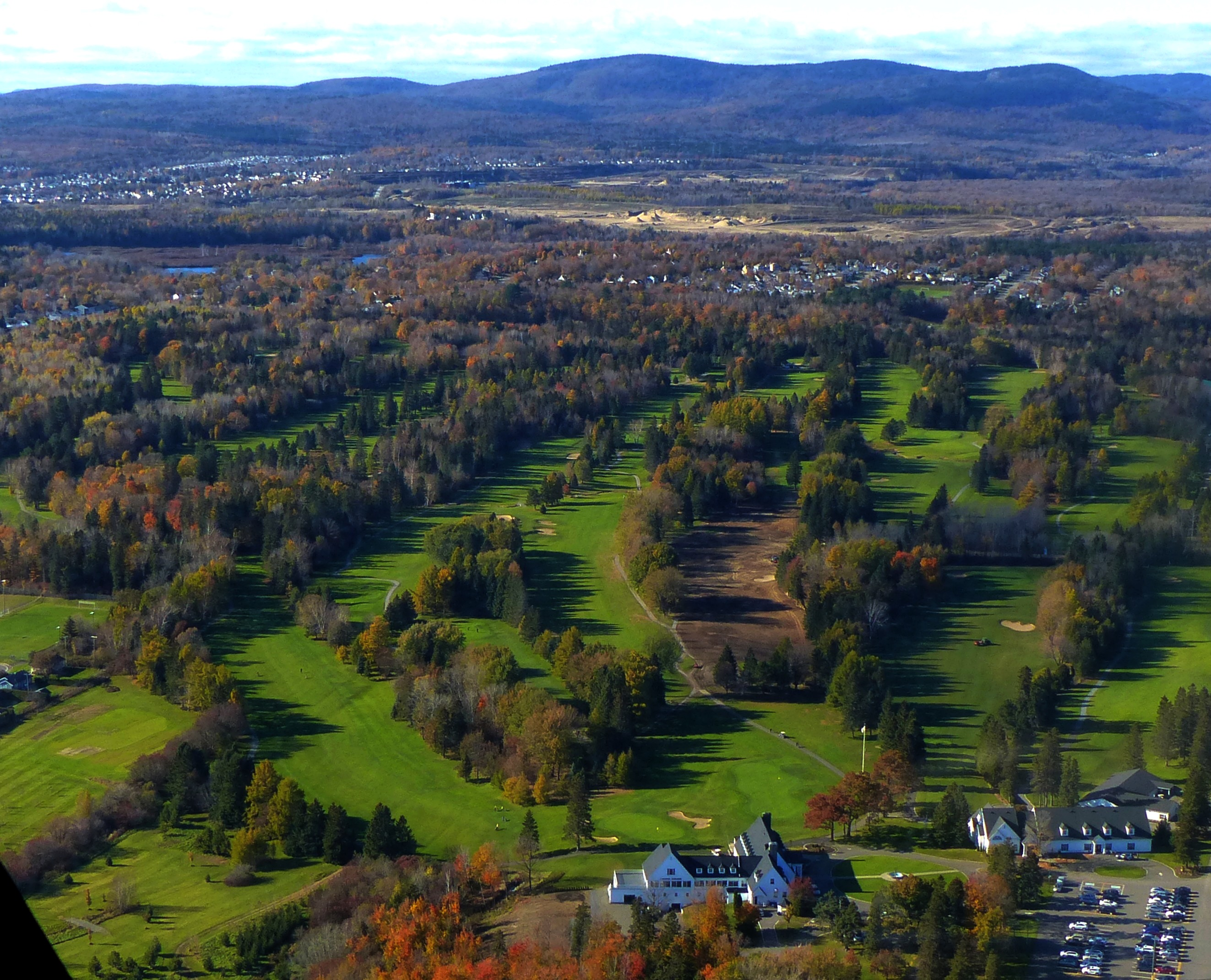
Royal Quebec Golf Club

Fleury worked as a civil servant and a human resources advisor in the governments of Quebec and Canada. He was married to Raymonde Doyon, had three sons and three daughters, and resided in Sainte-Foy, Quebec City.

Fleury coached and managed baseball teams in the summer, and was an avid golfer. He was elected a member of the Province of Quebec Golf Association in 1960, as a representative of the Royal Quebec Golf Club. He served three two-years terms on the provincial association, and was chairman of the annual tournament for the Duke of Kent Trophy at the Royal Quebec Golf Club. (Note: The Duke of Kent Trophy was named for the Prince George, Duke of Kent.)

Fleury died at Université Laval Hospital in Quebec City on July 12, 1997. His remains were cremated and interred in the mausoleum at La Souvenance Commemorative Park in Sainte-Foy.

== Honours and awards ==
Fleury was a lifetime member of the Province of Quebec Golf Association, and received the Laval Sportsmanship Award and the Canadian Centennial Medal in 1967. His service to hockey in Canada was recognized with a life membership in the CAHA in May 1973. While he was president of the CAHA in 1965, he received the Amateur Hockey Association of the United States citation award for contributions to the game in the United States. He was also a life member of the QAHA, and was inducted into the inaugural class of the Hockey Québec Hall of Fame in 1991.
