= Jack Miller (ice hockey) =

Canadian ice hockey player

- Born: September 16, 1925; Delisle, Saskatchewan, Canada
- Died: April 15, 2004 (aged 78)
- Height: 5 ft 8 in (173 cm)
- Weight: 155 lb (70 kg; 11 st 1 lb)
- Position: Left wing
- Shot: Left
- Played for: Chicago Black Hawks
- Playing career: 1943–1954

John Leslie "Jack" Miller (September 16, 1925 – April 15, 2004) was a Canadian ice hockey winger who played 17 games in the National Hockey League with the Chicago Black Hawks during the 1949–50 and 1950–51 seasons. The rest of his career, which lasted from 1943 to 1956, was spent in various minor leagues. He was born in Delisle, Saskatchewan.

== Career statistics ==
=== Regular season and playoffs ===
			Regular season					Playoffs
Season	Team	League	GP	G	A	Pts	PIM	GP	G	A	Pts	PIM
1941–42	Saskatoon Quakers	N-SJHL	8	2	1	3	2	2	0	0	0	0
1942–43	Prince Albert Black Hawks	N-SJHL	7	4	6	10	6	3	0	0	0	0
1942–43	Arnprior RCAF	UOVHL	8	6	7	13	2	2	1	1	2	0
1943–44	Arnprior RCAF	UOVHL	8	2	4	6	2	—	—	—	—	—
1944–45	Moose Jaw Canucks	S-SJHL	16	7	5	12	16	10	3	1	4	10
1945–46	Regina Capitals	WCSHL	30	12	11	23	6	—	—	—	—	—
1946–47	Los Angeles Ramblers	WIHL	48	8	20	28	38	—	—	—	—	—
1947–48	Kansas City Pla-Mors	USHL	66	23	28	51	59	7	2	1	3	2
1948–49	Kansas City Pla-Mors	USHL	66	18	36	54	46	2	0	2	2	2
1949–50	Chicago Black Hawks	NHL	6	0	0	0	0	—	—	—	—	—
1949–50	Kansas City Pla-Mors	USHL	62	19	31	50	38	3	0	2	2	2
1950–51	Chicago Black Hawks	NHL	11	0	0	0	4	—	—	—	—	—
1950–51	Milwaukee Sea Gulls	USHL	44	22	14	36	47	—	—	—	—	—
1951–52	Calgary Stampeders	PCHL	39	10	15	25	19	—	—	—	—	—
1952–53	Spokane Flyers	WIHL	59	45	50	95	68	9	5	0	5	18
1952–53	Spokane Flyers	Al-Cup	—	—	—	—	—	4	4	2	6	2
1953–54	Vernon Canadians	OSHL	63	29	57	86	18	5	4	3	7	0
1954–55	Spokane Flyers	WIHL	32	21	30	51	40	4	2	2	4	2
1955–56	Spokane Flyers	WIHL	46	21	56	77	66	10	3	7	10	0
1955–56	Spokane Flyers	Al-Cup	—	—	—	—	—	6	4	1	5	0
USHL totals			238	82	109	191	190	12	2	5	7	6
NHL totals			17	0	0	0	4	—	—	—	—	—
