= Aggie Kukulowicz =

Canadian ice hockey player (1933–2008)

- Born: April 2, 1933 Winnipeg, Manitoba, Canada
- Died: September 26, 2008 (aged 75) Toronto, Ontario, Canada
- Height: 6 ft 3 in (191 cm)
- Weight: 175 lb (79 kg; 12 st 7 lb)
- Position: Centre
- Shot: Left
- Played for: New York Rangers
- Playing career: 1952–1965

Adolph Frank "Aggie" Kukulowicz (April 2, 1933 – September 26, 2008) was a Canadian professional ice hockey player and Russian-language interpreter. He played four games in the National Hockey League for the New York Rangers, then played 12 combined seasons in the minor leagues and senior ice hockey leagues. He won two Turner Cup championships with the St. Paul Saints in the International Hockey League, and was a 1964 Allan Cup champion with the Winnipeg Maroons. He was fluent in Russian and Polish, had a brief coaching career with GKS Katowice in Poland, and later worked as a European scout for the Philadelphia Flyers.

Kukulowicz spent six years in Moscow working for Air Canada. He was a regular member of Alan Eagleson's travelling entourage, and was the interpreter and travel coordinator for the Canada men's national ice hockey team at the 1972 Summit Series and 1974 Summit Series. He later worked as an interpreter for the International Ice Hockey Federation (IIHF) from 1975 to 1993, which included the Ice Hockey World Championships, the Canada Cup, and the Super Series. Kukulowicz was inducted into both the Manitoba Hockey Hall of Fame and the Manitoba Sports Hall of Fame and Museum, as a member of the Winnipeg Maroons. He was honoured by the IIHF with the Paul Loicq Award in 2004, in recognition of significant contributions to international ice hockey.

== Early life ==
Kukulowicz was born on April 2, 1933, in Winnipeg. He was raised in the north end of Winnipeg by his parents who were Polish Canadians, and began playing hockey at age seven. He achieved high grades in school despite struggles to command the English language. He also played baseball in the summer as a youth and young adult. He was a right-handed pitcher for the Canadian Ukrainian Athletic Club team in the Baseball Manitoba senior league until the mid-1950s.

By age 16, Kukulowicz had drawn the attention of National Hockey League (NHL) scouts, and had grown to his full height of 6 ft 3 in (191 cm) tall. According to Alan Eagleson, when professional hockey agents attempted to sign him to a contract, "he was hiding under his bed at the instruction of his mother, who felt he was too young to begin a career in hockey". In 1949, Kukulowicz signed a contract with a signing bonus of C$7,500, and was sent to develop in junior ice hockey.

== Playing career ==
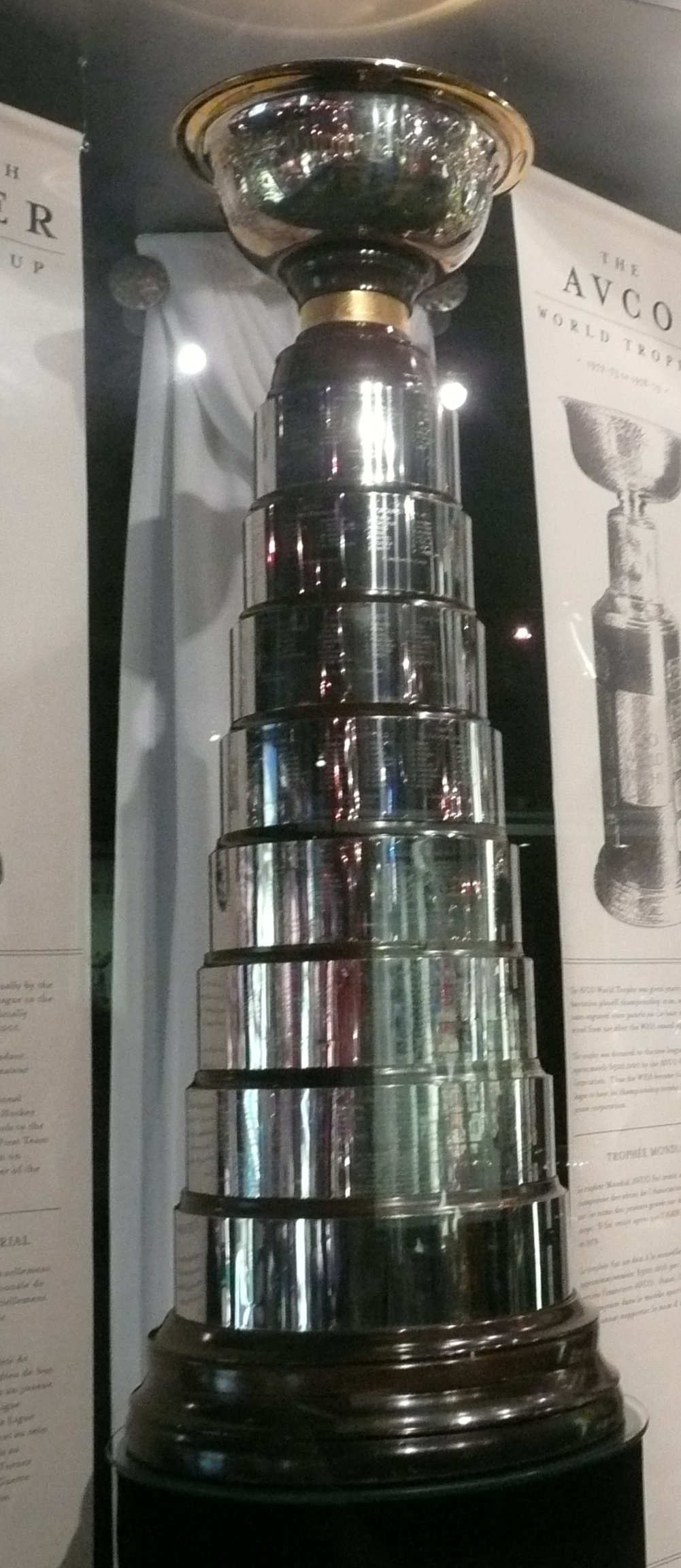
The Turner Cup was the championship trophy of the International Hockey League.

Kukulowicz began playing junior ice hockey for the Brandon Wheat Kings in the Manitoba Junior Hockey League. He scored 27 goals and had 30 assists in 36 games played during his first season. He transferred to the Quebec Citadelles in the Quebec Junior Hockey League for the 1951–52 season, and led his team in scoring with 24 goals. He began the 1952–53 season in the NHL with the New York Rangers, and scored a goal in his debut game. He finished the season with the Quebec Citadelles after playing three games in the NHL, and helped the Citadelles reach the Eastern Canada junior finals. He returned to the NHL for the 1953–54 season, but played only one game due to a back injury from a body check. His NHL tenure included just four games, and he continued his playing career in the minor leagues and in senior ice hockey leagues.

Kukulowicz played the next five seasons in the Western Hockey League. He played the 1953–54 and 1954–55 seasons with the Saskatoon Quakers. On August 18, 1955, the New York Rangers traded the NHL rights to Kukulowicz and Billy Dea to the Detroit Red Wings in exchange for Bronco Horvath and Dave Creighton. Kukulowicz switched to the Brandon Regals for the 1955–56 season, a farm team of the Red Wings. He played for the New Westminster Royals during the 1956–57 season, and reached the finals for the Lester Patrick Cup in the WHL playoffs. He played the 1957–58 season for the Seattle Totems, and returned to the Saskatoon Quakers to begin the 1958–59 season. He played just 9 games for the Quakers and switched to senior ice hockey teams for the remainder of the season. After 14 games for the Quebec Aces in the Quebec Senior Hockey League, he moved to the Cornwall Chevies in the Eastern Ontario Hockey League. He played 18 regular season games for Cornwall, followed by the league's playoffs.

Kukulowicz returned to professional hockey with the St. Paul Saints in the International Hockey League during the 1959–60 season. He scored 38 goals, 80 assists and 118 points that season, and was named the 1959–60 IHL second team All-Star. He scored six goals in the playoffs, and helped the Saints win the Turner Cup as champions of the IHL. He scored another six goals in the 1960–61 season playoffs, and the Saints repeated as the league's Turner Cup champions. Kukulowicz moved to the Minneapolis Millers in the same league for the 1961–62 season, but did not get beyond the first round of that year's IHL playoffs.

Kukulowicz returned home for the 1962–63 season, and played senior ice hockey for the Winnipeg Maroons coached by Gord Simpson. The Maroons won the Manitoba Senior Hockey League that season, and reached the finals of the 1963 Allan Cup for the Canadian national senior ice hockey championship, but were defeated by the Windsor Bulldogs in five games. The Maroons went on a playing tour of Europe in early 1964, and the team was unsure if it would have enough players to participate in the 1964 Manitoba Senior Hockey League playoffs. The Maroons managed to find enough players, won 12 of 13 playoff games, and captured the 1964 Allan Cup by defeating the Woodstock Athletics in four consecutive games. Kukulowicz and his teammates were not paid salaries for the season, and the team donated proceeds from tickets to its home games to charities in Winnipeg.

During the 1964–65 season, the Maroons played games versus teams in the Saskatchewan Senior Hockey League, and travelled to Europe in February and March 1965 as the second Canada men's national ice hockey team. Kukulowicz had his first international playing experience during the tour, and played against the national teams from the Soviet Union, Czechoslovakia, United States and Sweden. He retired from playing during the season due to a serious on-ice accident.

== Ice hockey coach and NHL scout ==
In March 1965, Kukulowicz was offered a job as a coach in Poland, due to his ability to speak the Polish language fluently combined with his playing experience. He was hesitant to accept a job behind the Iron Curtain despite the opportunity to visit family, and took the time to think it over before accepting. He served as coach of GKS Katowice in the Polska Hokej Liga during the 1965–66 Polska Liga Hokejowa season, along with fellow coach Stanislav Konopásek. His team placed fourth overall in the league's regular season with 22 wins. In the playoffs, he led the team to nine wins in eighteen games and placed third. He later worked as a scout for the Philadelphia Flyers in the 1970s. He was one of the first NHL scouts in Europe, after Flyers' coach Fred Shero had insisted on having a European scout.

== Interpreter and businessman ==
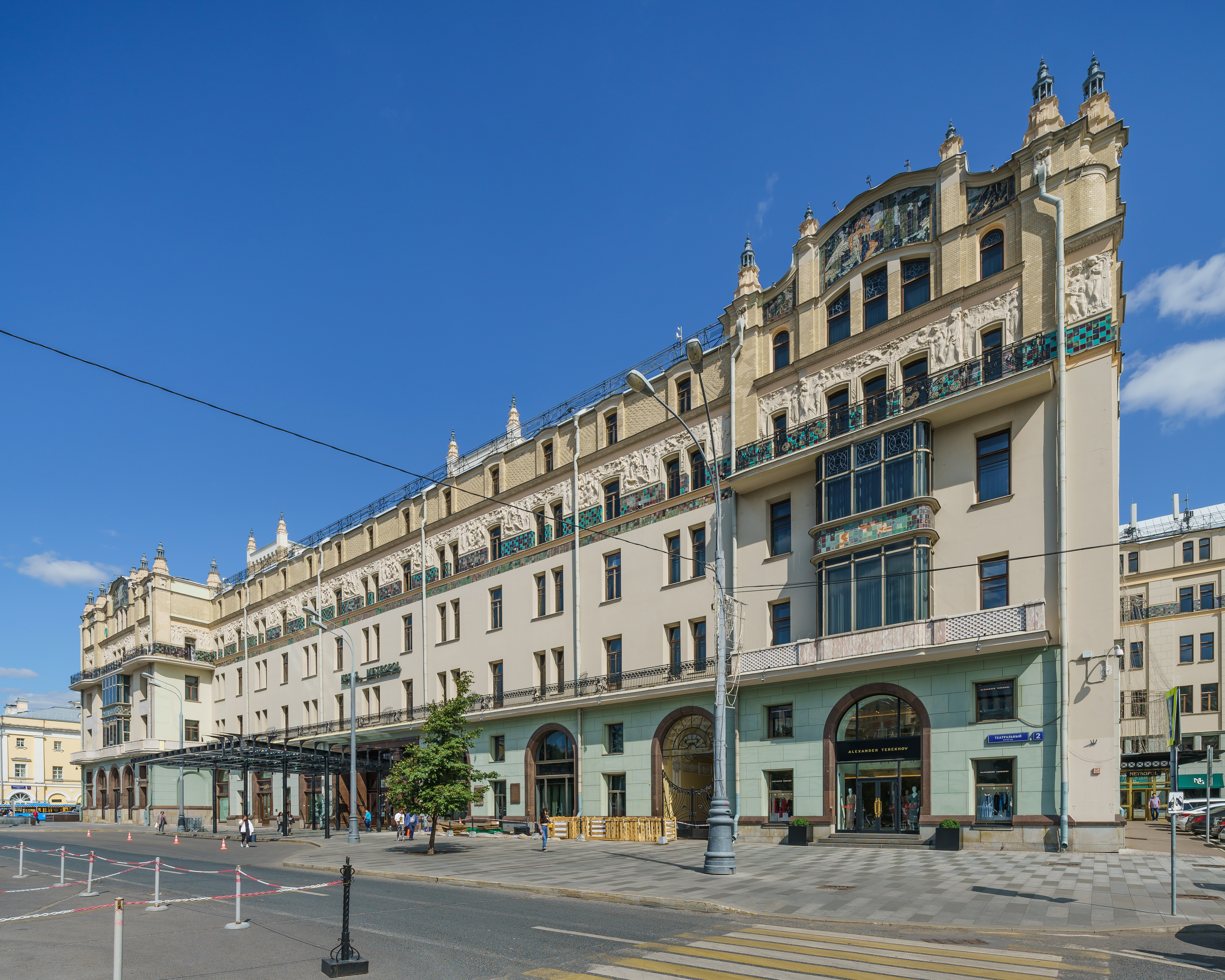
The Hotel Metropol Moscow

Kukulowicz began working as a baggage handler for Air Canada in 1964. When the airline was searching for someone with knowledge of Polish, he was put into service as an interpreter between the Prime Minister of Poland and the Prime Minister of Canada. In addition to Polish, Kukulowicz spoke Russian, Ukrainian, Czech, German and French. He became the airline's representative in Russia in 1965, and opened an office in Moscow. He moved into the Hotel Metropol Moscow when he arrived, then later lived in an apartment complex designated for foreign persons when his family joined him. His time in Moscow coincided with the Cold War. While his apartment was being repainted, covert listening devices were found in the walls. He was followed by a KGB agent for six years, but the two men never spoke to each other. Kukulowicz reportedly once bought two ice cream cones during the summer and gave one to his follower, who accepted it without saying anything.

Kukulowicz was involved in negotiations for many hockey-related contracts, and was called the "Henry Kissinger of Hockey". He became friends with Alan Eagleson, and was his interpreter and a regular part of Eagleson's travelling entourage. Kukulowicz relocated to Toronto after six years in Moscow. He became a sales manager for Air Canada, marketing airline sales to travelling sports teams. He assisted in booking the Canada men's national ice hockey team travels to and from Europe, and was Canada's interpreter at the 1972 Summit Series and 1974 Summit Series. He was respected by the Soviets since he had lived in Moscow. During this time, he acquired the Canadian distribution rights to the Soviet song "No Coward Plays Hockey" written by Aleksandra Pakhmutova.

Kukulowicz worked as an interpreter for the International Ice Hockey Federation (IIHF) from 1975 to 1993, which included the annual Ice Hockey World Championships. He attended all five Canada Cup tournaments from 1976 to 1991, and was able to provide sports broadcasts with information on Soviet players who were not well known at the time. During a pre-taped interview on Hockey Night in Canada for the Super Series '76, he translated while off-camera and speaking into an earpiece worn by Valeri Kharlamov. Kukulowicz translated at the 1980 Super Series, and acted as a liaison between the NHL and the Soviet teams. He also coordinated trips for NHL teams going to the Soviet Union, and was a reference for hotels, meals and cultural programs.

== Awards and honours ==
The Allan Cup was the championship trophy of senior ice hockey in Canada.

As a member of the 1964 Allan Cup champion Winnipeg Maroons, Kukulowicz was inducted into both the Manitoba Hockey Hall of Fame, and the Manitoba Sports Hall of Fame and Museum in 2003. He was honoured by the IIHF with the Paul Loicq Award in 2004, in recognition of significant contributions to the IIHF and the international game.

== Personal life ==
Kukulowicz met his wife Diane in 1956, while he was playing for New Westminster. He was reportedly trying to impress her with his skating skills during a public skate. The couple later had one daughter and two sons. He was a resident of Gabriola Island, and member of the local golf and country club. He was reported to enjoy drinking a vodka martini or Canadian Club after a game of golf. Alan Eagleson described Kukulowicz as "a gregarious man who made everyone feel like his best friend", and said that "Aggie loved everyone and everyone loved Aggie". Kukulowicz was friends with Sergei Makarov and Igor Larionov. He attended the 35th anniversary of the 1972 Summit Series, held in Moscow during August 2007.

Kukulowicz died on September 26, 2008, in Toronto, due to heart failure. He was predeceased by his wife and daughter. Memorials for him were scheduled at the Cathedral Church of St. James, and the Gabriola Golf and Country Club.

== Career statistics ==
=== Regular season and playoffs ===
			Regular season					Playoffs
Season	Team	League	GP	G	A	Pts	PIM	GP	G	A	Pts	PIM
1950–51	Brandon Wheat Kings	MJHL	36	27	30	57	18	6	5	4	9	0
1951–52	Quebec Citadelles	QJHL	50	24	35	59	5	15	2	13	15	10
1952–53	New York Rangers	NHL	3	1	0	1	0	—	—	—	—	—
1952–53	Quebec Citadelles	QJHL	46	13	24	37	109	9	6	2	8	4
1952–53	Quebec Citadelles	M-Cup	—	—	—	—	—	8	3	5	8	0
1953–54	New York Rangers	NHL	1	0	0	0	0	—	—	—	—	—
1953–54	Saskatoon Quakers	WHL	70	14	27	41	38	6	0	1	1	2
1954–55	Saskatoon Quakers	WHL	57	12	25	37	31	—	—	—	—	—
1955–56	Brandon Regals	WHL	67	16	38	54	38	—	—	—	—	—
1956–57	New Westminster Royals	WHL	70	7	32	39	71	13	0	3	3	10
1957–58	Seattle Totems	WHL	67	5	23	28	61	9	2	2	4	15
1958–59	Saskatoon Quakers	WHL	9	1	6	7	0	—	—	—	—	—
1958–59	Quebec Aces	QSHL	14	2	8	10	8	—	—	—	—	—
1958–59	Cornwall Chevies	EOHL	18	5	13	18	6	6	1	2	3	2
1959–60	St. Paul Saints	IHL	68	38	80	118	57	13	6	8	14	0
1960–61	St. Paul Saints	IHL	72	34	53	87	39	13	6	13	19	19
1961–62	Minneapolis Millers	IHL	62	24	61	85	8	5	1	3	4	13
1962–63	Winnipeg Maroons	MSHL	10	3	12	15	0	—	—	—	—	—
1962–63	Winnipeg Maroons	Al-Cup	—	—	—	—	—	15	6	11	17	14
1963–64	Winnipeg Maroons	MSHL	16	12	15	27	14	—	—	—	—	—
1963–64	Winnipeg Maroons	Al-Cup	—	—	—	—	—	13	9	13	22	6
1964–65	Winnipeg Maroons	MSHL	6	2	3	5	0	—	—	—	—	—
WHL totals			340	55	151	206	239	28	2	6	8	27
IHL totals			202	96	194	290	104	31	13	24	37	32
NHL totals			4	1	0	1	0	—	—	—	—	—

== Bibliography ==
- Denault, Todd (2011). The Greatest Game: The Montreal Canadiens, the Red Army, and the Night That Saved Hockey. Toronto, Ontario: McClelland & Stewart. ISBN 978-0-7710-2635-5 – via Google Books.
- Houston, William; Shoalts, David (1993). Eagleson: The Fall of a Hockey Czar. Whitby, Ontario: McGraw-Hill Ryerson. ISBN 0-07-551706-X.
- Gibbons, Denis (2017). Hockey: My Door to Europe. Victoria, British Columbia: Friesens. ISBN 978-1-5255-0803-5 – via Google Books.
