= Jack Lancien =

Canadian ice hockey player

- Born: June 14, 1923; Regina, Saskatchewan, Canada
- Died: June 7, 1991 (aged 67); Spokane, Washington, United States
- Height: 6 ft 0 in (183 cm)
- Weight: 188 lb (85 kg; 13 st 6 lb)
- Position: Defence
- Shot: Left
- Played for: New York Rangers
- Playing career: 1945–1961

John Gordon "Jack" Lancien (June 14, 1923 – June 7, 1991) was a Canadian ice hockey player. He played in 63 games in the National Hockey League with the New York Rangers from 1947 to 1950. He tallied 1 goal and 5 assists in his NHL career. The rest of his career, which lasted from 1945 to 1961, was spent in the minor leagues.

== Professional career ==
Jack Lancien was a skilled defenceman who played parts of four seasons with the New York Rangers in the 1940s and 1950s. He was a fine playmaker who could cover people in his own end. He also had a lengthy 15-year career playing in the minors and senior leagues.

Lancien began his career playing junior hockey with the hometown Regina Pats. In 1946–47 he played in one game for the Rangers but otherwise played for the New York Rovers in the Eastern Hockey League. The next year he was recalled for a couple of playoff games then dressed for 43 contests in 1949–50.

After playing 19 games in 1950–51, Lancien returned to the minors where he remained until he retired in 1961. Along the way, some of his most productive years came in the Western Hockey League with the Vancouver Canucks and the senior Spokane Flyers of the Western International Hockey League.

== Personal life ==
At the conclusion of his hockey career, Jack Lancien settled in Spokane, Washington and worked as a Conductor for the Great Northern Railway where he was employed until his retirement. Lancien enjoyed playing golf, and became very skilled on the links with a zero (or scratch) handicap.

Lancien was twice married and had three children, (two daughters and a son) and three grandsons. Lancien died in 1991 at the age of 67 from cancer.

== Career statistics ==
=== Regular season and playoffs ===
			Regular season					Playoffs
Season	Team	League	GP	G	A	Pts	PIM	GP	G	A	Pts	PIM
1945–46	Regina Capitals	WCSHL	12	1	2	3	12	—	—	—	—	—
1946–47	New York Rangers	NHL	1	0	0	0	0	—	—	—	—	—
1946–47	New York Rovers	EAHL	55	3	11	14	44	9	0	0	0	9
1947–48	New Haven Ramblers	AHL	68	7	20	27	64	4	0	1	1	4
1947–48	New York Rangers	NHL	—	—	—	—	—	2	0	0	0	2
1948–49	New Haven Ramblers	AHL	67	2	24	26	66	—	—	—	—	—
1949–50	New York Rangers	NHL	43	1	4	5	27	4	0	1	1	0
1949–50	New Haven Ramblers	AHL	26	2	7	9	17	—	—	—	—	—
1949–50	St. Paul Saints	USHL	4	0	2	2	4	—	—	—	—	—
1950–51	New York Rangers	NHL	19	0	1	1	8	—	—	—	—	—
1950–51	Cincinnati Mohawks	AHL	40	4	6	10	41	—	—	—	—	—
1951–52	Cincinnati Mohawks	AHL	61	2	4	6	43	7	0	1	1	4
1952–53	Vancouver Canucks	WHL	64	10	12	22	39	9	0	1	1	4
1953–54	Vancouver Canucks	WHL	70	9	24	33	54	12	0	4	4	8
1954–55	Vancouver Canucks	WHL	70	5	30	35	17	5	0	1	1	4
1955–56	Spokane Flyers	WIHL	44	7	32	39	13	10	1	9	10	2
1955–56	Spokane Flyers	Al-Cup	—	—	—	—	—	6	0	3	3	0
1956–57	Spokane Flyers	WIHL	48	9	23	32	23	9	0	10	10	0
1957–58	Spokane Flyers	WIHL	47	11	29	40	13	13	1	6	7	2
1958–59	Spokane Spokes	WHL	31	1	12	13	6	4	0	1	1	0
1958–59	Trail Smoke Eaters	WIHL	5	1	3	4	0	—	—	—	—	—
1959–60	Spokane Comets	WHL	1	0	0	0	0	—	—	—	—	—
1960–61	Rossland Warriors	WIHL	4	1	1	2	—	—	—	—	—	—
AHL totals			262	17	61	78	231	11	0	2	2	8
WHL totals			236	25	78	103	116	30	0	7	7	16
NHL totals			63	1	5	6	35	6	0	1	1	2
