= John Henderson (ice hockey) =

Canadian ice hockey player (1933–2024)

- Born: March 25, 1933 Toronto, Ontario, Canada
- Died: October 4, 2024 (aged 91) White Rock, British Columbia, Canada
- Height: 6 ft 1 in (185 cm)
- Weight: 174 lb (79 kg; 12 st 6 lb)
- Position: Goaltender
- Caught: Left
- Played for: Boston Bruins
- Playing career: 1953–1961; 1965–1970
Medal record
World Championships
Gold medal – first place	1958 Oslo

John Duncan Henderson (March 25, 1933 – October 4, 2024) was a Canadian professional ice hockey goaltender.

== Career ==
Henderson played 46 games for the Boston Bruins of the National Hockey League (NHL) between 1954 and 1956. The rest of his career lasted from 1953 to 1961, and again from 1965 to 1970, was spent in various minor leagues. With the Whitby Dunlops he won the 1957 and 1959 Allan Cup, the senior championship of Canada. He also was the back up goalie at the 1958 Ice Hockey World Championships where, though he did not play in a game, he won a gold medal.

== Death ==
Henderson died in White Rock, British Columbia on October 4, 2024, at the age of 91.

== Career statistics ==
=== Regular season and playoffs ===
			Regular season									Playoffs
Season	Team	League	GP	W	L	T	MIN	GA	SO	GAA	SV%	GP	W	L	MIN	GA	SO	GAA	SV%
1950–51	Weston Dukes	OHA B	7	7	0	0	420	15	1	2.14	—	—	—	—	—	—	—	—	—
1950–51	Toronto Marlboros	OHA	12	—	—	—	720	39	1	3.25	—	—	—	—	—	—	—	—	—
1951–52	Toronto Marlboros	OHA	16	—	—	—	960	39	1	2.44	—	6	2	4	360	26	0	4.33	—
1952–53	Toronto Marlboros	OHA	50	—	—	—	3000	128	3	2.56	—	7	—	—	420	23	0	3.29	—
1952–53	Pittsburgh Hornets	AHL	1	0	1	0	60	1	0	1.00	—	—	—	—	—	—	—	—	—
1953–54	Springfield Indians	QHL	22	8	11	3	1357	93	0	4.11	—	—	—	—	—	—	—	—	—
1953–54	Syracuse Warriors	AHL	21	3	17	1	1260	141	0	6.71	—	—	—	—	—	—	—	—	—
1954–55	Boston Bruins	NHL	45	15	13	16	2658	113	5	2.55	.903	2	0	2	120	8	0	4.00	.849
1954–55	Hershey Bears	AHL	15	7	5	3	900	46	0	3.07	—	—	—	—	—	—	—	—	—
1955–56	Boston Bruins	NHL	1	0	1	0	60	4	0	4.00	.857	—	—	—	—	—	—	—	—
1955–56	Whitby Dunlops	OHA Sr	23	—	—	—	1380	76	1	3.30	—	—	—	—	—	—	—	—	—
1956–57	Whitby Dunlops	OHA Sr	20	—	—	—	1184	47	2	2.38	—	8	—	—	480	17	1	2.12	—
1956–57	Whitby Dunlops	Al-Cup	—	—	—	—	—	—	—	—	—	18	12	6	1090	64	0	3.52	—
1957–58	Whitby Dunlops	OHA Sr	22	—	—	—	1320	70	1	3.18	—	—	—	—	—	—	—	—	—
1957–58	Hull-Ottawa Canadiens	OHA Sr	1	0	1	0	60	6	0	6.00	—	—	—	—	—	—	—	—	—
1958–59	Whitby Dunlops	OHA Sr	50	—	—	—	3000	145	2	2.90	—	10	—	—	600	24	2	2.40	—
1958–59	Whitby Dunlops	Al-Cup	—	—	—	—	—	—	—	—	—	12	10	2	720	27	0	2.25	—
1959–60	Whitby Dunlops	OHA Sr	53	—	—	—	3180	191	3	3.67	—	11	—	—	660	47	0	4.27	—
1959–60	Cleveland Barons	AHL	1	1	0	0	60	3	0	3.00	—	—	—	—	—	—	—	—	—
1960–61	Kingston Frontenacs	EPHL	39	15	17	7	2340	145	1	3.72	—	5	1	4	303	14	0	2.77	—
1965–66	Oklahoma City Blazers	CHL	2	1	1	0	120	7	0	3.50	—	—	—	—	—	—	—	—	—
1965–66	San Francisco Seals	WHL	10	3	6	1	613	40	0	3.92	—	—	—	—	—	—	—	—	—
1965–66	Victoria Maple Leafs	WHL	14	8	6	0	844	51	1	3.63	—	14	8	6	890	42	0	2.83	—
1966–67	California Seals	WHL	3	2	1	0	180	9	0	3.00	—	—	—	—	—	—	—	—	—
1966–67	Hershey Bears	AHL	16	9	5	0	866	46	3	3.19	—	5	1	4	300	15	0	3.00	—
1967–68	Hershey Bears	AHL	32	11	13	3	1756	112	0	3.83	—	—	—	—	—	—	—	—	—
1968–69	Hershey Bears	AHL	41	23	14	3	2252	109	2	2.90	—	11	8	3	660	32	2	2.91	—
1969–70	Hershey Bears	AHL	6	—	—	—	306	24	0	4.71	—	—	—	—	—	—	—	—	—
NHL totals			46	15	14	16	2719	117	5	2.58	.902	—	—	—	—	—	—	—	—
