= Frank King (ice hockey) =

Canadian ice hockey forward

- Born: March 7, 1929 Toronto, Ontario, Canada
- Died: September 25, 2004 (aged 75) Vernon, British Columbia, Canada
- Height: 5 ft 11 in (180 cm)
- Weight: 185 lb (84 kg; 13 st 3 lb)
- Position: Centre
- Shot: Left
- Played for: Montreal Canadiens
- Playing career: 1949–1960

Frank Edward King (March 7, 1929 – September 25, 2004) was a Canadian ice hockey forward who played 10 games in the National Hockey League for the Montreal Canadiens during the 1950–51 season. The rest of his career, which lasted from 1949 to 1960, was spent in the minor leagues.

== Career statistics ==
=== Regular season and playoffs ===
			Regular season					Playoffs
Season	Team	League	GP	G	A	Pts	PIM	GP	G	A	Pts	PIM
1946–47	Fife Flyers	SNL	—	—	—	—	—	—	—	—	—	—
1947–48	Brandon Wheat Kings	MJHL	22	13	8	21	31	5	4	0	4	10
1948–49	Brandon Wheat Kings	MJHL	30	27	14	41	78	7	6	2	8	4
1948–49	Brandon Wheat Kings	M-Cup	—	—	—	—	—	18	16	7	23	7
1949–50	Minneapolis Millers	USHL	70	34	30	64	49	7	5	4	9	10
1950–51	Montreal Canadiens	NHL	10	1	0	1	2	—	—	—	—	—
1950–51	Cincinnati Mohawks	AHL	21	5	6	11	20	—	—	—	—	—
1950–51	Seattle Ironmen	PCHL	3	1	1	2	5	—	—	—	—	—
1950–51	Providence Reds	AHL	21	3	12	15	16	—	—	—	—	—
1951–52	Quebec Aces	QSHL	36	4	4	8	24	7	1	1	2	10
1952–53	Halifax Atlantics	MMHL	72	38	40	78	92	15	7	8	15	31
1953–54	Sudbury Wolves	NOHA	45	14	11	25	26	1	0	0	0	0
1954–55	Vernon Canadians	OSHL	50	22	27	49	121	5	1	3	4	0
1954–55	Vernon Canadians	Al-Cup	—	—	—	—	—	17	12	8	20	29
1955–56	Vernon Canadians	OSHL	56	40	34	74	115	9	4	6	10	14
1955–56	Vernon Canadians	Al-Cup	—	—	—	—	—	16	18	3	21	35
1956–57	Vernon Canadians	OSHL	50	17	33	50	90	12	7	13	20	18
1957–58	Vernon Canadians	OSHL	54	38	29	67	111	4	1	1	2	13
1958–59	Vernon Canadians	OSHL	52	23	28	51	—	16	3	6	9	38
1959–60	Vernon Canadians	OSHL	12	11	8	19	2	13	11	9	20	24
OSHL totals			274	151	159	310	—	59	27	38	65	107
NHL totals			10	1	0	1	2	—	—	—	—	—
