= Dave Gatherum =

Canadian ice hockey player (1932–2024)

- Born: March 28, 1932; Fort William, Ontario, Canada
- Died: June 20, 2024 (aged 92); Thunder Bay, Ontario, Canada
- Height: 5 ft 8 in (173 cm)
- Weight: 165 lb (75 kg; 11 st 11 lb)
- Position: Goaltender
- Caught: Left
- Played for: Detroit Red Wings
- Playing career: 1952–1959

David Robert Gatherum (March 28, 1932 – June 20, 2024) was a Canadian professional ice hockey goaltender. He played three games in the National Hockey League with the Detroit Red Wings during the 1953–54 season. The rest of his career lasted from 1952 to 1959 and was spent in the minor leagues.

== Playing career ==
On October 11, 1953, Gatherum replaced injured Terry Sawchuk to record a shutout in his National Hockey League (NHL) debut for Detroit's 4–0 win over Toronto. He then played on October 16 and 17 for Detroit. Terry returned from injury and Gatherum returned to minors having two wins, and one tie. He never lost an NHL game. He also set an NHL record for the longest shutout sequence by a goaltender to start a career 100.21 min Oct 11-16, 1953. The record stood until 2011. He was recalled for playoffs as a spare goaltender and got his name on the Stanley Cup with Detroit in 1954. Gatherum would never play in the NHL again. He spent the rest of his career playing in the minors or senior hockey until retiring after the 1959 season.

== Career statistics ==
=== Regular season and playoffs ===
			Regular season								Playoffs
Season	Team	League	GP	W	L	T	MIN	GA	SO	GAA	GP	W	L	MIN	GA	SO	GAA
1948–49	Fort William Hurricanes	TBJHL	12	3	8	1	720	67	1	5.58	1	0	1	0	60	8	0	8.00
1949–50	Fort William Hurricanes	TBJHL	17	10	6	1	1020	82	0	4.24	5	—	—	—	300	17	1	3.40
1950–51	Fort William Hurricanes	TBJHL	21	11	10	0	1260	84	0	4.00	12	—	—	—	720	52	0	4.33
1951–52	Fort William Hurricanes	TBJHL	30	15	14	1	1080	128	0	4.27	9	7	2	0	540	30	0	3.33
1951–52	Fort William Hurricanes	M-Cup	—	—	—	—	—	—	—	—	12	5	5	2	760	36	0	2.80
1952–53	Shawinigan Falls Cataractes	QSHL	30	6	21	3	1830	112	0	3.67	—	—	—	—	—	—	—	—
1952–53	Edmonton Flyers	WHL	6	3	1	2	360	14	0	2.30	—	—	—	—	—	—	—	—
1952–53	St. Louis Flyers	AHL	11	3	8	0	660	55	0	5.00	—	—	—	—	—	—	—	—
1953–54	Detroit Red Wings	NHL	3	2	0	1	180	3	1	1.00	—	—	—	—	—	—	—	—
1953–54	Sherbrooke Saints	QSHL	53	24	24	5	3240	176	4	3.26	4	1	3	0	240	13	0	3.25
1954–55	Quebec Aces	QSHL	20	9	10	0	1174	74	1	3.78	—	—	—	—	—	—	—	—
1954–55	Edmonton Flyers	WHL	4	1	2	1	240	15	0	3.75	—	—	—	—	—	—	—	—
1954–55	New Westminster Royals	WHL	4	1	1	2	240	10	0	2.50	—	—	—	—	—	—	—	—
1955–56	Kelowna Packers	OSHL	52	22	28	2	3120	221	1	4.25	10	4	6	0	600	37	0	3.70
1955–56	New Westminster Royals	WHL	7	1	6	0	422	32	0	4.55	—	—	—	—	—	—	—	—
1955–56	Vernon Canadians	Allan Cup	—	—	—	—	—	—	—	—	10	4	6	0	600	37	0	3.70
1956–57	Kelowna Packers	OSHL	49	—	—	—	2940	213	1	4.34	7	2	5	0	420	30	0	4.29
1957–58	Kelowna Packers	OSHL	51	—	—	—	3060	183	0	3.61	12	8	3	1	720	32	1	2.67
1957–58	Kelowna Packers	Al-Cup	—	—	—	—	—	—	—	—	17	11	6	0	1020	41	4	2.41
1958–59	Kelowna Packers	OSHL	53	—	—	—	3180	189	2	3.57	—	—	—	—	—	—	—	—
1958–59	Nelson Maple Leafs	WIHL	—	—	—	—	—	—	—	—	1	1	0	0	60	4	0	4.00
NHL totals			3	2	0	1	180	3	1	1.00	—	—	—	—	—	—	—	—
