= Spokane Spokes =

Ice hockey team

- City: Spokane, Washington
- League: Western Hockey League
- Operated: 1958–1959
- Home arena: Spokane Coliseum
- Head coach: Roy McBride

Franchise history
- 1958–1959: Spokane Spokes
- 1959–1963: Spokane Comets
- 1963–1964: Denver Invaders
- 1964–1967: Victoria Maple Leafs
- 1967–1974: Phoenix Roadrunners (WHL)
- 1974–1977: Phoenix Roadrunners (WHA)

The Spokane Spokes were a minor league professional ice hockey team that operated from 1958 to 1959 in the Western Hockey League.

After the 1958–1959 season the team was renamed Spokane Comets.

== Roster ==
- C Gene "Max" Mekilok Canada
- LW/C Earl "Ching" Johnson Canada
- RW Al Johnson Canada
- C Del Topoll Canada
- RW Nelson "Blinky" Boyce Canada
- C Bev Bell Canada
- C Walter Bradley Canada
- D Joe Lund Finland
- D Tom Hodges Canada
- C Lloyd Maxfield Canada
- RW Ron Attwell Canada
- D Benny Woit Canada
- RW Buddy Bodman Canada
- D Jack Lancien Canada
- W Art Hart Canada
- C Frank Kubasek Canada
- D Tom Williams Canada
- D Harry Smith Canada
- D Lionel Repka Canada
- D Connie Madigan Canada
- D George Ferguson Canada
- F Lorne Nadeau Canada
- D Bob Duncan Canada
- G Emile Francis Canada

== Spokes Alumni ==
- Emile Francis - New York Rangers and St. Louis Blues coach, later GM and member of Hockey Hall of Fame
