= Dave MacKay (ice hockey) =

Canadian ice hockey player

- Born: January 14, 1919; Cardston, Alberta, Canada
- Died: May 1, 1980 (aged 61); Vernon, British Columbia, Canada
- Height: 6 ft 0 in (183 cm)
- Weight: 210 lb (95 kg; 15 st 0 lb)
- Position: Defence
- Shot: Right
- Played for: Chicago Black Hawks
- Playing career: 1939–1954

David Stanley MacKay (January 14, 1919 – May 1, 1980) was a Canadian ice hockey player who played 27 games in the National Hockey League for the Chicago Black Hawks during the 1940–41 season. The rest of his career, which lasted from 1937 to 1954, was spent in various minor leagues. He was born in Edmonton, Alberta. He died of acute respiratory failure in 1980 in Vernon, British Columbia, where he worked as an engineer.

== Career statistics ==
=== Regular season and playoffs ===
			Regular season					Playoffs
Season	Team	League	GP	G	A	Pts	PIM	GP	G	A	Pts	PIM
1936–37	Edmonton Athletic Club	EJrHL	6	3	1	4	12	3	0	1	1	0
1937–38	University of Alberta	ESrHL	22	17	9	26	59	—	—	—	—	—
1938–39	University of Alberta	ESrHL	19	19	5	24	60	—	—	—	—	—
1939–40	Edmonton Flyers	ESrHL	9	3	1	4	8	—	—	—	—	—
1940–41	Chicago Black Hawks	NHL	27	3	0	3	28	5	0	1	1	2
1940–41	Providence Reds	AHL	15	2	5	7	6	—	—	—	—	—
1941–42	Nanaimo Clippers	PCHL	27	3	0	3	26	5	0	1	1	2
1942–43	Nanaimo Clippers	PCHL	14	17	14	31	24	3	3	0	3	4
1943–44	Nanaimo Army	NNDHL	14	8	4	12	33	—	—	—	—	—
1943–44	Vancouver Army	NNDHL	—	—	—	—	—	3	2	2	4	2
1944–45	Petawawa Engineers	OVHL	—	—	—	—	—	—	—	—	—	—
1947–48	New Westminster Royals	PCHL	13	3	11	14	47	5	1	1	2	14
1948–49	New Westminster Royals	PCHL	3	0	0	0	8	—	—	—	—	—
1949–50	Vernon Canadians	OSHL	43	13	9	22	86	4	2	1	3	8
1950–51	Vernon Canadians	OSHL	51	8	14	22	65	10	1	2	3	20
1951–52	Vernon Canadians	OSHL	5	0	1	1	4	—	—	—	—	—
1952–53	Vernon Canadians	OSHL	—	—	—	—	—	—	—	—	—	—
1953–54	Vernon Canadians	OSHL	43	5	25	30	51	—	—	—	—	—
NHL totals			27	3	0	3	28	5	0	1	1	2
