= East Kootenay Rams =

The East Kootenay Rams were a senior men's team ice hockey team that played in Cranbrook, British Columbia. They only played during the 1960-61 season in the Western International Hockey League.

They were formed in January 1961 to replace the Trail Smoke Eaters who traveled to Europe to represent Canada at the 1961 World Ice Hockey Championships.

The East Kootenay Rams won the WIHL semi-final but lost the league final to the Nelson Maple Leafs. The playing coach was Bill Hryciuk.
