= Fred Dunsmore =

Canadian ice hockey player

- Born: March 30, 1929 Winnipeg, Manitoba, Canada
- Died: May 13, 2014 (aged 85) Winnipeg, Manitoba, Canada
- Height: 5 ft 11 in (180 cm)
- Weight: 190 lb (86 kg; 13 st 8 lb)
- Position: Centre
- Played for: Winnipeg Maroons
- National team: Canada
- Playing career: 1944–1967

Frederick Roy Dunsmore (March 30, 1929 – May 13, 2014) was a Canadian ice hockey centerman who was runner-up for Manitoba's "Athlete of the Century".

He played baseball for the Winnipeg Goldeyes briefly in 1954.

== Awards and achievements ==
- Allan Cup Championship (1964)
- Played in the World Championships for Canada’s National Team (1966)
- Inducted into the Manitoba Sports Hall of Fame and Museum in 1989
- "Honoured Member" of the Manitoba Hockey Hall of Fame
