= Okanagan Mainline League =

The Okanagan Mainline League is a defunct senior men's ice hockey league that operated in British Columbia, Canada from 1949 to 1951.

This senior league was previously an intermediate league. It was promoted in 1949.

There was a serious travel problem between the teams in the Okanagan Valley and the Nanaimo Clippers on Vancouver Island. This was the main reason the league only lasted two seasons before splitting up into the Okanagan Senior League and the Pacific Coast Senior League.

== League champions ==
- 1949-50: Kamloops Elks
- 1950-51: Nanaimo Clippers
