= Lionel Repka =

Canadian ice hockey player

- Born: 7 February 1935 Edmonton, AB, CAN
- Died: 27 April 2015 (aged 80)
- Height: 5 ft 10 in (178 cm)
- Weight: 185 lb (84 kg; 13 st 3 lb)
- Position: Defence
- Shot: Left
- Played for: Fort Wayne Komets
- Playing career: 1955–1969

Lionel Repka (7 February 1935 – 27 April 2015) was a Canadian professional ice hockey defenceman, born in Edmonton, Alberta.

== Career ==
Repka began his career with the Edmonton Oil Kings of the WCJHL, and the Spokane Spokes, Seattle Americans and Edmonton Flyers of the WHL, before going to the IHL.

Over eleven seasons in the International Hockey League (1958–69) Repka played 666 games – all with the Fort Wayne Komets. His number 6 is retired by Fort Wayne. He retired from hockey, sold insurance and died of cancer in 2015. His nickname choo choo was a pun on both Lional trains which were popular at the time but also because he was like a locomotive on the ice, fast and powerful.

== Awards ==
The IHL awarded Repka the Governor's Trophy as the league's most outstanding defenseman during the 1964–65 season. His number 6 was retired by the Komets and hangs in the Memorial Coliseum
