= Ross Parke =

Canadian ice hockey player

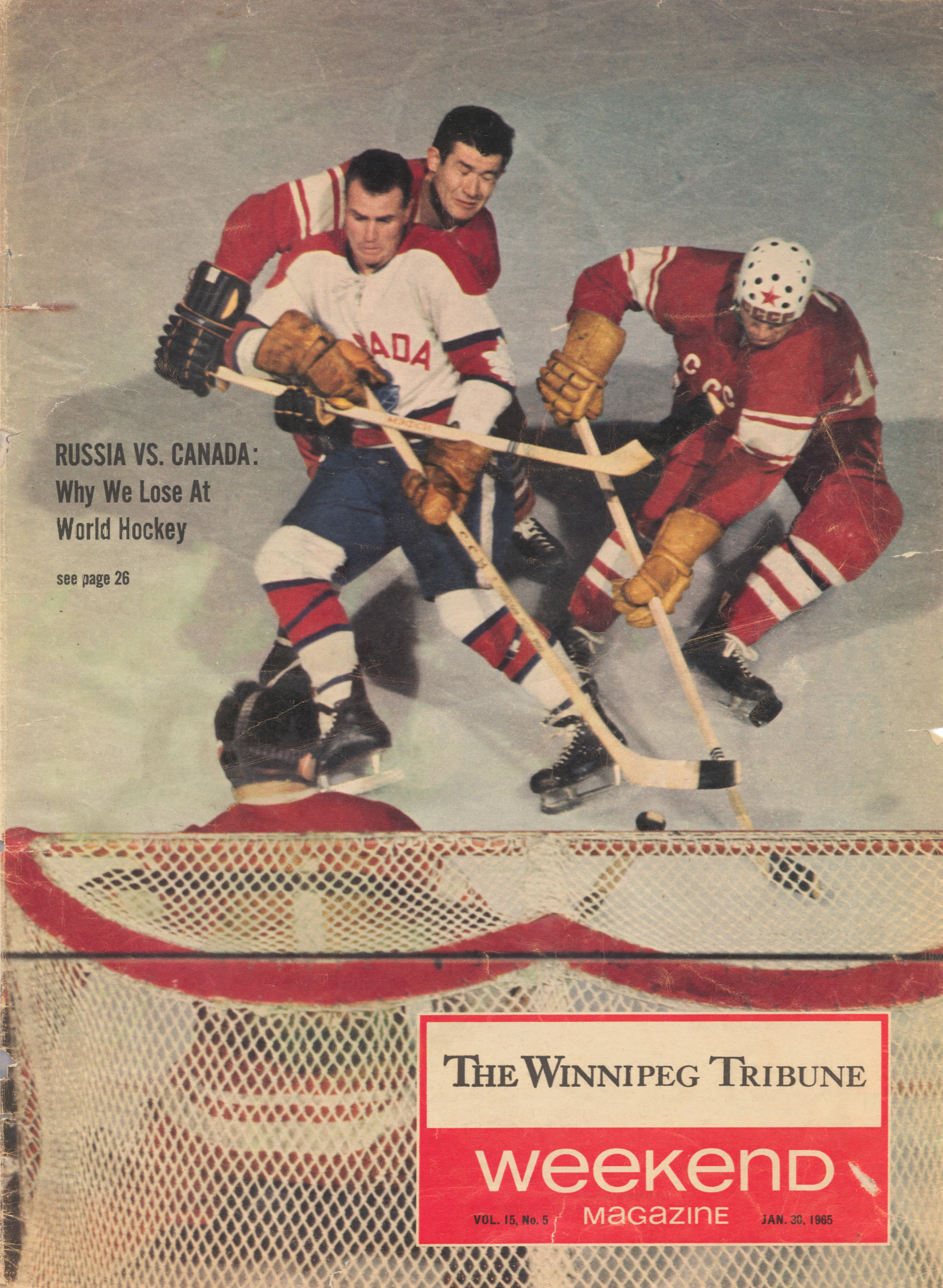
- Ross Parke, Maple Leaf Gardens, 1965
- Born: February 18, 1932 (age 94) Winnipeg, Manitoba, Canada
- Height: 5 ft 8 in (173 cm)
- Weight: 170 lb (77 kg; 12 st 2 lb)
- Position: Forward
- Shot: Left
- Played for: Winnipeg Monarchs (WHL); Milwaukee Chiefs (AFL); Michigan State Spartans; Winnipeg Maroons; Canada's National team
- National team: Canada
- Playing career: 1951–1965

Ross Parke (born February 18, 1932, in Winnipeg, Manitoba) was a Canadian ice hockey amateur forward. Ross was on the Detroit Red Wing's negotiation list, but maintained his amateur status and played in the Memorial Cup in 1951 with the Winnipeg Monarchs. For the next four years, he played with Michigan State University in the NCAA and was the team leading scorer for three consecutive years. From there, he played with the Winnipeg Maroons winning the Allan Cup in 1964. He also played in the World Championships for Canada's National team in 1965 in Tampere, Finland. In 1972, Ross played in Russia with the Canadian Old Timers against the Soviet Old Timers.

In October 2017, Ross Parke was inducted into the Manitoba Hockey Hall of Fame.

== Awards and achievements ==
- 1951: Winnipeg Monarch Junior Abbott Cup Champions
- 1951: Winnipeg Monarch Junior Memorial Cup Finalist against Barrie Flyers
- 1952 Winnipeg Monarch Junior Allstar
- 1953: Milwaukee Chiefs – International League- farm team of Detroit Red Wings
- 1954-58: Michigan State University NCAA hockey-team leading scorer 3 consecutive years
- 1961: Represented Canada in Czechoslovakia tour
- 1961: Winnipeg Maroons - Patton Memorial Cup Champions
- 1963: Winnipeg Maroons – Patton Memorial Cup Champions
- 1964: MVP in Geneva tournament ( Russia, Czechoslovakia, Wpg Maroons)scored 6 goals in one game
- 1964: Allan Cup Champions. Leading scorer in total points for series
- 1965: Canada's National Team – World Hockey tournament in Tampere, Finland
- 1966: Coached the River Heights Midget Team - City Champions
- 1967: Coached the River Heights Juvenile Team – City and Provincial Champions
- 1972: Played in Russia with the Canadian Old Timers
