= 1960–61 WIHL season =

North American ice hockey season

1960–61 was the 15th season of the Western International Hockey League.

During the 1960–61 season, the WIHL played interlocking with the Okanagan Senior League. In January, during the middle of season, the Trail Smoke Eaters traveled to Europe for the 1961 World Ice Hockey Championships. The East Kootenay Rams, from Cranbrook, British Columbia were formed to replace them.

== Standings ==
- Trail Smoke Eaters 34-4-0-68 255-117
- Nelson Maple Leafs 18-18-0-36 147-157
- Rossland Warriors 13-22-1-27 150-197
- East Kootenay Rams 2-15-1-5 54-127

== Playoffs ==
=== Semi final (2 games total goals) ===
- Game 1: Rossland 4 East Kootenay 3
- Game 2: East Kootenay 4 Rossland 0

East Kootenay Rams beat Rossland Warriors 7 goals to 4 to win right to play the Nelson Maple Leafs.

=== Final (Best of 5) ===
- Game 1: East Kootenay 4 Nelson 1
- Game 2: Nelson 4 East Kootenay 2
- Game 3: East Kootenay 6 Nelson 5
- Game 4: Nelson 5 East Kootenay 2
- Game 5: Nelson 5 East Kootenay 3

The Nelson Maple Leafs beat East Kootenay Rams 3 wins to 2. The Nelson Maple Leafs advanced to the 1969-61 British Columbia Senior Playoffs.
