= Vernon Canadians =

Canadian ice hockey team (1949-1961)

The Vernon Canadians were a men's ice hockey team from Vernon, British Columbia that played in the Okanagan Mainline League or the Okanagan Senior League from 1949 to 1961. In 1962, after the Okanagan Senior League folded, the Canadians became a beer league team and then an “old timers” team that still plays today.

The Vernon Canadians won the 1956 Allan Cup, becoming the national senior ice hockey champions. This made them Canada's representative for the 1957 World Ice Hockey Championships, but the tournaments was being held in Moscow, and western nations boycotted them in protest over the Soviet Union's invasion of Hungary in 1956.

They were the Western Canada senior champion one more time, losing in the 1959 Allan Cup national finals to the Whitby Dunlops.

== Season-by-season record ==
=== Okanagan Mainline League ===
Season	Games	Won	Lost	Tied	Points	GoalsFor GoalsAgainst	Standing	Playoffs	
1949–50	48	21	25	2	-	215	237	4th	out of playoffs	
1950–51	55	17	38	0	-	220	297	4th	Lost Final

=== Okanagan Senior League ===
Season	Games	Won	Lost	Tied	Points	GoalsFor	GoalsAgainst	Standing	Playoffs	
1951–52	50	27	23	0	54	-	-	2nd	Lost Semi Final	
1952–53	54	20	31	3	43	203	262	4th	Lost Semi Final	
1953–54	64	25	36	3	53	281	311	4th	Lost Semi Final	
1954–55	54	27	24	3	57	212	198	2nd	Won Final, Won Province, Lost West Final	
1955–56	56	37	17	2	76	-	-	1st	Won Final, Won Province, Won West, Won Allan Cup	
1956–57	54	32	19	3	67	269	221	1st	Won Final, Lost Province	
1957–58	54	24	29	1	49	228	257	3rd	Lost Semi Final	
1958–59	54	25	25	4	54	244	269	2nd	Won Final, Won Province, Won West, Lost Allan Cup	
1959–60	47	37	9	1	75	305	160	1st	Lost Final	
1960–61	51	32	19	0	-	331	264	1st	Won Final, Lost Province

== Notable alumni ==
- Dick Butler
- Marcel Dheere
- Dave Gatherum
- Johnny Harms
- Bing Juckes
- Frank King
- Odie Lowe
- Dave MacKay
- Connie Madigan
- Doug McKay
- Jim McLeod
- Jack Miller
- Alex Ritson
- George Agar
- Walt Trentini
- Tom Stecyk
- Hal Gordon
- Orv Lavell
- Willie Schmidt
- Merv Bidoski
- Art Hart
- Don McLeod
