= 1957 Allan Cup =

Canadian senior ice hockey championship

The Allan Cup trophy

The 1957 Allan Cup was the Canadian senior ice hockey championship for the 1956–57 senior "A" season. The event was hosted by the Whitby Dunlops and Toronto, Ontario. The 1957 playoff marked the 49th time that the Allan Cup has been awarded.

The 1957 Allan Cup may have been the first time in history an American team competed in the final.

== Teams ==
- Whitby Dunlops (Eastern Canadian Champions)
- Spokane Flyers (Western Canadian Champions)

== Playdowns ==
=== Allan Cup Best-of-Seven Series ===
Whitby Dunlops 5 - Spokane Flyers 2
Whitby Dunlops 6 - Spokane Flyers 3
Whitby Dunlops 7 - Spokane Flyers 3
Whitby Dunlops 6 - Spokane Flyers 2

=== Eastern Playdowns ===
The Eastern Playdowns were drastically shortened due to a lack of amateur Quebec clubs and the Maritime provinces declaring none of their teams fit for that level of competition.

Final

Whitby Dunlops defeated North Bay Trappers 4-games-to-3

Whitby Dunlops 4 - North Bay Trappers 2
North Bay Trappers 7 - Whitby Dunlops 4
North Bay Trappers 6 - Whitby Dunlops 3
Whitby Dunlops 5 - North Bay Trappers 4
Whitby Dunlops 4 - North Bay Trappers 3
North Bay Trappers 5 - Whitby Dunlops 2
Whitby Dunlops 7 - North Bay Trappers 5

=== Western Playdowns ===
Most of the Prairie provinces had come to support professional teams over amateur teams, leaving a few remaining leagues to compete for the Allan Cup.

Final

Spokane Flyers defeated Fort William Beavers 4-games-to-2 with 1 tie

Spokane Flyers 3 - Fort William Beavers 1
Spokane Flyers 3 - Fort William Beavers 2
Fort William Beavers 6 - Spokane Flyers 5
Spokane Flyers 2 - Fort William Beavers 2
Fort William Beavers 4 - Spokane Flyers 2
Spokane Flyers 6 - Fort William Beavers 1
Spokane Flyers 4 - Fort William Beavers 1
