= Gerry Penner =

Canadian ice hockey player (1934–2023)

- Born: June 20, 1934 Hague, Saskatchewan, Canada
- Died: October 19, 2023 (aged 89)
- Height: 5 ft 9 in (175 cm)
- Weight: 175 lb (79 kg; 12 st 7 lb)
- Position: Left wing
- Shot: Left
- Played for: Trail Smoke Eaters; New Westminster Royals; Seattle Americans
- National team: Canada
- Playing career: 1953–1967
Medal record
Men's ice hockey
| Gold medal – first place | 1961 Switzerland | Ice hockey |

Gerald Murray Penner (June 20, 1934 – October 19, 2023) was a Canadian ice hockey player with the Trail Smoke Eaters. He won a gold medal at the 1961 World Ice Hockey Championships in Switzerland. He also played with the New Westminster Royals and Seattle Americans. Penner died on October 19, 2023, at the age of 89.
