= 1959 Allan Cup =

Canadian senior ice hockey championship

The Allan Cup trophy

The 1959 Allan Cup was the Canadian senior ice hockey championship for the 1958–59 senior "A" season. The event was hosted by the Whitby Dunlops and Toronto, Ontario. The 1959 playoff marked the 51st time that the Allan Cup has been awarded.

== Teams ==
- Whitby Dunlops (Eastern Canadian Champions)
- Vernon Canadians (Western Canadian Champions)

== Playdowns ==
=== Allan Cup Best-of-Seven Series ===
Whitby Dunlops 5 - Vernon Canadians 2
Whitby Dunlops 5 - Vernon Canadians 2
Whitby Dunlops 5 - Vernon Canadians 2
Vernon Canadians 3 - Whitby Dunlops 0
Whitby Dunlops 9 - Vernon Canadians 3

=== Eastern Playdowns ===
Quarter-final

Kitchener-Waterloo Flying Dutchmen defeated Iroquois Falls Eskimos 3-games-to-none with 1 tie

Kitchener-Waterloo Flying Dutchmen 7 - Iroquois Falls Eskimos 1
Kitchener-Waterloo Flying Dutchmen 5 - Iroquois Falls Eskimos 2
Kitchener-Waterloo Flying Dutchmen 3 - Iroquois Falls Eskimos 3
Kitchener-Waterloo Flying Dutchmen 7 - Iroquois Falls Eskimos 2

Hull Legion defeated Miramichi Beavers 3-games-to-1

Hull Legion 6 - Miramichi Beavers 4
Miramichi Beavers 3 - Hull Legion 2
Hull Legion 6 - Miramichi Beavers 5
Hull Legion 3 - Miramichi Beavers 2

Semi-final

Whitby Dunlops defeated Kitchener-Waterloo Flying Dutchmen 4-games-to-1

Whitby Dunlops 4 - Kitchener-Waterloo Flying Dutchmen 1
Whitby Dunlops 5 - Kitchener-Waterloo Flying Dutchmen 2
Kitchener-Waterloo Flying Dutchmen 3 - Whitby Dunlops 1
Whitby Dunlops 3 - Kitchener-Waterloo Flying Dutchmen 2
Whitby Dunlops 3 - Kitchener-Waterloo Flying Dutchmen 2

Hull Legion defeated Montreal St-Vincent-de-Paul 2-games-to-1

Hull Legion 4 - Montreal St-Vincent-de-Paul 3
Montreal St-Vincent-de-Paul 5 - Hull Legion 2
Hull Legion 4 - Montreal St-Vincent-de-Paul 1

Final

Whitby Dunlops defeated Hull Legion 2-games-to-none

Whitby Dunlops 7 - Hull Legion 3
Whitby Dunlops 10 - Hull Legion 3

=== Western Playdowns ===
Quarter-final

Port Arthur Bearcats defeated Winnipeg Maroons 3-games-to-2

Winnipeg Maroons 3 - Port Arthur Bearcats 2
Port Arthur Bearcats 5 - Winnipeg Maroons 2
Port Arthur Bearcats 6 - Winnipeg Maroons 5
Winnipeg Maroons 4 - Port Arthur Bearcats 2
Port Arthur Bearcats 2 - Winnipeg Maroons 1

Semi-final

Regina Caps defeated Port Arthur Bearcats 3-games-to-2

Port Arthur Bearcats 2 - Regina Caps 1
Port Arthur Bearcats 3 - Regina Caps 1
Regina Caps 8 - Port Arthur Bearcats 5
Regina Caps 6 - Port Arthur Bearcats 5
Regina Caps 5 - Port Arthur Bearcats 3

Final

Vernon Canadians defeated Regina Caps 4-games-to-1

Vernon Canadians 4 - Regina Caps 3
Regina Caps 3 - Vernon Canadians 2
Vernon Canadians 6 - Regina Caps 3
Vernon Canadians 3 - Regina Caps 2
Vernon Canadians 4 - Regina Caps 1
