= 1964 Allan Cup =

Canadian senior ice hockey championship

The Allan Cup trophy

The 1964 Allan Cup was the Canadian senior ice hockey championship for the 1963–64 senior "A" season. The event was hosted by the Winnipeg Maroons and Winnipeg, Manitoba. The 1964 playoff marked the 56th time that the Allan Cup was awarded.

== Teams ==
- Woodstock Athletics (Eastern Canadian Champions)
- Winnipeg Maroons (Western Canadian Champions)

== Playdowns ==
=== Allan Cup Best-of-Seven Series ===
Winnipeg Maroons 5 - Woodstock Athletics 0
Winnipeg Maroons 7 - Woodstock Athletics 1
Winnipeg Maroons 5 - Woodstock Athletics 0
Winnipeg Maroons 5 - Woodstock Athletics 3

=== Eastern Playdowns ===
Quarter-final

Windsor Maple Leafs defeated Montreal Boisclair 3-games-to-none

Windsor Maple Leafs 11 - Montreal Boisclair 2
Windsor Maple Leafs 7 - Montreal Boisclair 1
Windsor Maple Leafs 11 - Montreal Boisclair 4

Semi-final

Woodstock Athletics defeated Rouyn-Noranda Alouettes 4-games-to-1

Rouyn-Noranda Alouettes 6 - Woodstock Athletics 4
Woodstock Athletics 5 - Rouyn-Noranda Alouettes 2
Woodstock Athletics 6 - Rouyn-Noranda Alouettes 5
Woodstock Athletics 7 - Rouyn-Noranda Alouettes 5
Woodstock Athletics 6 - Rouyn-Noranda Alouettes 2

Ottawa Montagnards defeated Windsor Maple Leafs 3-games-to-2

Windsor Maple Leafs 4 - Ottawa Montagnards 3
Ottawa Montagnards 7 - Windsor Maple Leafs 4
Ottawa Montagnards 5 - Windsor Maple Leafs 4
Windsor Maple Leafs 5 - Ottawa Montagnards 2
Ottawa Montagnards 7 - Windsor Maple Leafs 4

Final

Woodstock Athletics defeated Ottawa Montagnards 4-games-to-none

Woodstock Athletics 7 - Ottawa Montagnards 2
Woodstock Athletics 10 - Ottawa Montagnards 1
Woodstock Athletics 6 - Ottawa Montagnards 2
Woodstock Athletics 8 - Ottawa Montagnards 5

=== Western Playdowns ===
Quarter-final

Kimberley Dynamiters defeated Lacombe Rockets 3-games-to-2

Lacombe Rockets 5 - Kimberley Dynamiters 3
Lacombe Rockets 7 - Kimberley Dynamiters 5
Kimberley Dynamiters 7 - Lacombe Rockets 2
Kimberley Dynamiters 8 - Lacombe Rockets 5
Kimberley Dynamiters 7 - Lacombe Rockets 4

Semi-final

Saskatoon Quakers defeated Kimberley Dynamiters 4-games-to-none

Saskatoon Quakers 8 - Kimberley Dynamiters 1
Saskatoon Quakers 6 - Kimberley Dynamiters 1
Saskatoon Quakers 5 - Kimberley Dynamiters 4
Saskatoon Quakers 5 - Kimberley Dynamiters 4

Winnipeg Maroons defeated Port Arthur Bearcats 4-games-to-none

Winnipeg Maroons 6 - Port Arthur Bearcats 3
Winnipeg Maroons 5 - Port Arthur Bearcats 3
Winnipeg Maroons 8 - Port Arthur Bearcats 3
Winnipeg Maroons 9 - Port Arthur Bearcats 0

Final

Winnipeg Maroons defeated Saskatoon Quakers 4-games-to-1

Winnipeg Maroons 6 - Saskatoon Quakers 1
Winnipeg Maroons 7 - Saskatoon Quakers 5
Winnipeg Maroons 5 - Saskatoon Quakers 4
Saskatoon Quakers 7 - Winnipeg Maroons 5
Winnipeg Maroons 6 - Saskatoon Quakers 2
