= 1963 Allan Cup =

Canadian senior ice hockey championship

The Allan Cup trophy

The 1963 Allan Cup was the Canadian senior ice hockey championship for the 1962–63 senior "A" season. The event was hosted by the Windsor Bulldogs and Windsor, Ontario. The 1963 playoff marked the 55th time that the Allan Cup has been awarded.

== Teams ==
- Windsor Bulldogs (Eastern Canadian Champions)
- Winnipeg Maroons (Western Canadian Champions)

== Playdowns ==
=== Allan Cup Best-of-Seven Series ===
Windsor Bulldogs 5 - Winnipeg Maroons 4
Windsor Bulldogs 3 - Winnipeg Maroons 2
Windsor Bulldogs 2 - Winnipeg Maroons 0
Winnipeg Maroons 3 - Windsor Bulldogs 1
Windsor Bulldogs 3 - Winnipeg Maroons 2

=== Eastern Playdowns ===
Quarter-final

Moncton Hawks defeated Prescott-Kemptville Combines 3-games-to-1

Moncton Hawks 5 - Prescott-Kemptville Combines 3
Prescott-Kemptville Combines 6 - Moncton Hawks 2
Moncton Hawks 4 - Prescott-Kemptville Combines 3
Moncton Hawks 12 - Prescott-Kemptville Combines 3

Semi-final

Windsor Bulldogs defeated Rouyn-Noranda Alouettes 3-games-to-none

Windsor Bulldogs 11 - Rouyn-Noranda Alouettes 2
Windsor Bulldogs 14 - Rouyn-Noranda Alouettes 4
Windsor Bulldogs 7 - Rouyn-Noranda Alouettes 4

Moncton Hawks defeated Sherbrooke Beavers 3-games-to-none

Moncton Hawks 5 - Sherbrooke Beavers 2
Moncton Hawks 5 - Sherbrooke Beavers 3
Moncton Hawks 3 - Sherbrooke Beavers 1

Final

Windsor Bulldogs defeated Moncton Hawks 4-games-to-1

Moncton Hawks 3 - Windsor Bulldogs 2
Windsor Bulldogs 6 - Moncton Hawks 2
Windsor Bulldogs 8 - Moncton Hawks 3
Windsor Bulldogs 5 - Moncton Hawks 2
Windsor Bulldogs 4 - Moncton Hawks 2

=== Western Playdowns ===
Semi-final

Saskatoon Quakers defeated Lacombe Rockets 3-games-to-1

Saskatoon Quakers 3 - Lacombe Rockets 2
Lacombe Rockets 7 - Saskatoon Quakers 5
Saskatoon Quakers 5 - Lacombe Rockets 2
Saskatoon Quakers 3 - Lacombe Rockets 2

Winnipeg Maroons defeated Port Arthur Bearcats 4-games-to-none

Winnipeg Maroons 5 - Port Arthur Bearcats 4
Winnipeg Maroons 2 - Port Arthur Bearcats 1
Winnipeg Maroons 13 - Port Arthur Bearcats 1
Winnipeg Maroons 10 - Port Arthur Bearcats 4

Final

Winnipeg Maroons defeated Saskatoon Quakers 4-games-to-3

Saskatoon Quakers 4 - Winnipeg Maroons 3
Saskatoon Quakers 5 - Winnipeg Maroons 3
Winnipeg Maroons 3 - Saskatoon Quakers 2
Saskatoon Quakers 7 - Winnipeg Maroons 5
Winnipeg Maroons 6 - Saskatoon Quakers 4
Winnipeg Maroons 5 - Saskatoon Quakers 3
Winnipeg Maroons 9 - Saskatoon Quakers 3
