= 1955 Allan Cup =

Canadian senior ice hockey championship

The Allan Cup trophy

The 1955 Allan Cup was the Canadian senior ice hockey championship for the 1954–55 senior "A" season. The event was hosted by the Kitchener-Waterloo Flying Dutchmen and Kitchener, Ontario. The 1955 playoff marked the 47th time that the Allan Cup has been awarded.

== Teams ==
- Kitchener-Waterloo Flying Dutchmen (Eastern Canadian Champions)
- Fort William Beavers (Western Canadian Champions)

== Playdowns ==
=== Allan Cup Best-of-Seven Series ===
Kitchener-Waterloo Flying Dutchmen 3 - Fort William Beavers 2
Fort William Beavers 6 - Kitchener-Waterloo Flying Dutchmen 4
Kitchener-Waterloo Flying Dutchmen 6 - Fort William Beavers 2
Kitchener-Waterloo Flying Dutchmen 7 - Fort William Beavers 6
Kitchener-Waterloo Flying Dutchmen 5 - Fort William Beavers 3

=== Eastern Playdowns ===
Semi-final

Kitchener-Waterloo Flying Dutchmen defeated Sault Ste. Marie Greyhounds 4-games-to-3

Sault Ste. Marie Greyhounds 1 - Kitchener-Waterloo Flying Dutchmen 0
Kitchener-Waterloo Flying Dutchmen 2 - Sault Ste. Marie Greyhounds 0
Sault Ste. Marie Greyhounds 2 - Kitchener-Waterloo Flying Dutchmen 1
Kitchener-Waterloo Flying Dutchmen 4 - Sault Ste. Marie Greyhounds 1
Sault Ste. Marie Greyhounds 5 - Kitchener-Waterloo Flying Dutchmen 3
Kitchener-Waterloo Flying Dutchmen 2 - Sault Ste. Marie Greyhounds 1
Kitchener-Waterloo Flying Dutchmen 6 - Sault Ste. Marie Greyhounds 1

Moncton Hawks defeated Ottawa RCAF Flyers 4-games-to-none

Moncton Hawks 4 - Ottawa RCAF Flyers 1
Moncton Hawks 5 - Ottawa RCAF Flyers 3
Moncton Hawks 7 - Ottawa RCAF Flyers 2
Moncton Hawks 7 - Ottawa RCAF Flyers 3

Final

Kitchener-Waterloo Flying Dutchmen defeated Moncton Hawks 4-games-to-1

Kitchener-Waterloo Flying Dutchmen 6 - Moncton Hawks 2
Kitchener-Waterloo Flying Dutchmen 8 - Moncton Hawks 4
Kitchener-Waterloo Flying Dutchmen 5 - Moncton Hawks 2
Moncton Hawks 6 - Kitchener-Waterloo Flying Dutchmen 0
Kitchener-Waterloo Flying Dutchmen 6 - Moncton Hawks 0

=== Western Playdowns ===
Semi-final

Vernon Canadians defeated Yorkton Terriers 4-games-to-2

Yorkton Terriers 6 - Vernon Canadians 5
Vernon Canadians 10 - Yorkton Terriers 1
Vernon Canadians 10 - Yorkton Terriers 1
Yorkton Terriers 5 - Vernon Canadians 4
Vernon Canadians 4 - Yorkton Terriers 3
Vernon Canadians 3 - Yorkton Terriers 2

Fort William Beavers defeated Winnipeg Maroons 4-games-to-none with 1 tie

Fort William Beavers 9 - Winnipeg Maroons 2
Fort William Beavers 4 - Winnipeg Maroons 2
Fort William Beavers 3 - Winnipeg Maroons 1
Fort William Beavers 5 - Winnipeg Maroons 5
Fort William Beavers 3 - Winnipeg Maroons 0

Final

Fort William Beavers defeated Vernon Canadians 4-games-to-2

Fort William Beavers 2 - Vernon Canadians 1
Fort William Beavers 3 - Vernon Canadians 1
Vernon Canadians 7 - Fort William Beavers 3
Fort William Beavers 4 - Vernon Canadians 1
Vernon Canadians 7 - Fort William Beavers 3
Fort William Beavers 3 - Vernon Canadians 2
