= Norm Lenardon =

Canadian ice hockey player (1933–2023)

- Born: October 20, 1933 Trail, British Columbia, Canada
- Died: August 22, 2023 (aged 89) Trail, British Columbia, Canada
- Height: 5 ft 10 in (178 cm)
- Weight: 169 lb (77 kg; 12 st 1 lb)
- Position: Right wing
- Shot: Left
- Played for: Trail Smoke Eaters; Rossland Warriors; Seattle Americans
- National team: Canada
- Playing career: 1953–1966
Medal record
Men's ice hockey
Gold medal – first place	1961 Switzerland	Ice hockey

Norman Lenardon (October 20, 1933 – August 22, 2023) was a Canadian ice hockey player with the Trail Smoke Eaters. He scored the winning goal to help Canada secure a gold medal at the 1961 World Ice Hockey Championships in Switzerland. He also played with the Rossland Warriors and Seattle Americans. Lenardon died in Trail, British Columbia on August 22, 2023, at the age of 89.
