= Denis Gibbons =

- Birth name: Denis Alfred Gibbons
- Born: 1932; Port Elliot, South Australia
- Origin: Melbourne, Victoria, Australia
- Died: 2002 (aged 69–70)
- Genres: Folk
- Occupation: Musician

Denis Alfred Gibbons (1932 – 2002) was an Australian folk musician, radio announcer and musicologist. He started in radio in 1951 with the Macquarie Radio Network and began recording Australian folk music in 1954. His first albums were released in 1960 and he regularly appeared on Australia's Channel Nine as a lead-in to their news reports. In 1982 he received an Advance Australia award for "his outstanding contribution to Australian Folk Music". He worked as a producer for Radio Australia. He died in 2002

== Biography ==
Denis Gibbons was born in 1932, his father, Alfred Charles Gibbons, was a hotelier. Gibbons grew up in Port Elliot, South Australia, he attended the Sisters of Mercy in Victor Harbour and then Rostrevor College in Adelaide. His early jobs included labouring in Adelaide, selling hardware, managing a bicycle shop, truck driving, working for the PMG and in factories. He started in radio in 1951. While working at 3SR, he was described in August 1953 in Melbourne's The Argus as a, "cheery breakfast and lunch-time announcer, is starting his own programme soon singing folk songs Burl Ives fashion with guitar." By May 1954 he was compère of Time for a Song at 3AW. In November 1955 he married Joan Carey in Shepparton.

Gibbons debut album, Trads and Anons, was issued in September 1960, which was reviewed by The Australian Women's Weekly's correspondent, "the disc is a cosmopolitan collection of folk songs including the Dutch 'Jan Himmerk', the Irish 'Spinning Wheel', the Australian 'Bold Tommy Payne', 'Dying Stockman', and 'Wild Colonial Boy', the English 'Early One Morning', and the Scottish 'Skye Boat Song'."

== Discography ==
=== Albums ===
- Trads and Anons (September 1960)
- 1975: Folksongs of Australia – The Struggle For Survival (W&G, double LP)
- ? Folk Songs with Denis Gibbons (W&G)
- 1995: Fair Dinkum Matilda (Move)

=== Extended plays ===
- 1960: Bush Songs (W&G)
- 1962: Shearing Songs (W&G)
- 1967: Folk Songs from Australia (W&G)

=== Singles ===
- "Jamaica Farewell" (1957)
- "Take a Message to Mary" (1959) – (W&G Records) (WG-SL-777)
- "Here Comes Summer" (1959) – W&G Records (WG-SL-814)
- "Along the Old Bush Track" (1959) – W&G Records (WG-SL-841)
- "The Drover's Dream" (1960) – W&G Records (WG-SL-986)
- "Michael (Row the Boat Ashore)" (Denis Gibbons with the Unichords and the Jack Varney 5) (1961) – W&G Records (WG-S-1254)
- "Tina" (Denis Gibbons with the Unichords and the Jack Varney 5) (1962) – W&G Records (WG-S-1301)
