= Chuck Lumsden =

Canadian sportsperson

Profile
- Positions: Guard, End

Personal information
- Born: July 23, 1932; Winnipeg, Manitoba
- Died: May 31, 2014 (aged 81); Winnipeg, Manitoba
- Listed height: 6 ft 0 in (1.83 m)
- Listed weight: 190 lb (86 kg)

Career history
- 1952–1955: Winnipeg Blue Bombers

Charles Lumsden (July 23, 1932 – May 31, 2014) was a Canadian professional football player who played for the Winnipeg Blue Bombers. He previously played for the Winnipeg Light Infantry. He also played ice hockey.
