= 1952–53 WIHL season =

North American ice hockey season

1952–53 was the seventh season of the Western International Hockey League.

== Standings ==
- Spokane Flyers 32-34-2 .568 284-257
- Trail Smoke Eaters 26-22-1 .541 246-219
- Nelson Maple Leafs 23-22-2 .511 210-212
- Kimberley Dynamiters 13-26-4 .349 177-229

== Semi finals ==
Best of 5

- Spokane 4 Nelson 1
- Nelson 6 Spokane 1
- Nelson 3 Spokane 1
- Spokane 5 Nelson 3
- Spokane 5 Nelson 3

Spokane Flyers beat Nelson Maple Leafs 3 wins to 2.

- Trail 6 Kimberley 2
- Trail 7 Kimberley 4
- Kimberley 7 Trail 5
- Kimberley 8 Trail 2
- Trail 6 Kimberley 2

Trail Smoke Eaters beat Kimberley Dynamiters 3 wins to 2.

== Final ==
Best of 5

- Spokane 4 Trail 2
- Spokane 6 Trail 3
- Trail 4 Spokane 2
- Spokane 2 Trail 0

Spokane Flyers beat Trail Smoke Eaters 3 wins to 1.

Spokane Flyers advanced to the 1952-53 British Columbia Senior Playoffs.
