= Roy McBride =

Canadian ice hockey player

- Born: 1921
- Died: October 14, 2007 (aged 85–86) Saskatoon, Saskatchewan, Canada
- Played for: EHL; Washington Eagles; PCHL; Seattle Ironmen; San Diego Skyhawks; USHL; Dallas Texans; Fort Worth Rangers
- Playing career: 1940–1951

Roy McBride (1921 - October 14, 2007) was a former professional ice hockey player and coach.

== Career ==
McBride started his professional career in 1940 as a player in the Eastern Hockey League with the Washington Eagles. He did not play between 1941 and 1945. At age 24, McBride's playing career resumed following World War II. During the 1945–46 season, he suited up with three different teams: the Seattle Ironmen (PCHL), Dallas Texans (USHL), and Fort Worth Rangers (USHL).

He played the 1946–47 season with the San Diego Skyhawks (PCHL), and in the 1947–48 season he returned to play with the Seattle Ironmen.

In the 1948–49 season, he played with the Spokane Flyers, who won the United States National Senior Championship that year.

He played the next two seasons (1949–50 and 1950–51) in the Quebec Senior Hockey League with the Quebec Aces, where he was coached by future Hockey Hall of Fame member Punch Imlach. He played the 1951–52 season in the WIHL with the Spokane Flyers.

=== Coaching ===
McBride proved himself to be a capable head coach as he guided his Spokane Flyers to three consecutive WIHL titles (1956–1958). McBride's 1956-57 Spokane Flyers team was the first United States team to reach the Allan Cup finals. In the 1960s, McBride went on to coach the Spokane Comets in the Western Hockey League.

== Awards ==
In 1956, he won the "Coach of the Year" award by the Spokane Regional Sports Commission.
