= Pacific Coast Senior League =

The Pacific Coast Senior League (also known as the Pacific Coast Hockey League) was a senior men's amateur ice hockey league that operated for the 1952–53 season.

== Teams ==
- Fresno Falcons
- Los Angeles Cardinals
- Oakland Knaves
- San Bernardino Braves
