= Winnipeg Maroons (ice hockey) =

The Winnipeg Maroons were a senior ice hockey team based in Winnipeg, Manitoba, Canada.

== History ==
The Allan Cup trophy

The Winnipeg Maroons existed as a senior hockey team off and on from at least 1925 to 1964. Senior hockey leagues did not consistently exist in Manitoba during those years, so the club would have competed in exhibition games during the years it was not part of an official league. This would have also prepared them for late season Allan Cup competition, where the winner of the Western Canada playdowns would face the representative from Eastern Canada for the Allan Cup senior ice hockey national championship.

The Winnipeg Maroons played in 1925–26 in the Central Hockey League; this league reorganized as the American Hockey Association, where the Maroons competed during the 1926–27 and 1927–28 seasons. Afterwards, the franchise became the St. Louis Flyers. A later senior team of the same name participated in the single 1954–55 season of the Manitoba Senior Hockey League.

The Winnipeg Maroons played a goodwill exhibition tour of Czechoslovakia from December 1960 to January 1961, accompanied by Canadian Amateur Hockey Association representative W. A. Hewitt.

The Winnipeg Maroons squad participated in the Saskatchewan Senior Hockey League from 1962–63 through 1964–65.

== Allan Cup ==
The Maroons lost to the Regina Capitals in the Western Canada quarterfinals for the 1953 Allan Cup.

In the Western playdowns for the 1954 Allan Cup, the Maroons defeated the Fort William Beavers in the quarterfinals, the Moose Jaw Millers in the semifinals, then fell to the Penticton Vees in the Western final. The Vees would go on to win that year's cup, defeating Eastern Canada's Sudbury Wolves.

In the Western playdowns for the 1955 Allan Cup, the Maroons lost to the Fort William Beavers in the semifinals.

In the Western playdowns for the 1956 Allan Cup, the Maroons defeated the Fort William Beavers in the semifinals, then fell to the Vernon Canadians in the Western final. The Canadians would go on to win that year's cup, defeating Eastern Canada's Chatham Maroons.

In the Western playdowns for the 1958 Allan Cup, the Maroons defeated the Fort William Beavers in the quarter-finals, the Red Deer Rustlers in the semifinals, then fell to the Kelowna Packers in the Western final. The Packers would lose to Eastern Canada's Belleville McFarlands at that year's national finals.

In the Western playdowns for the 1959 Allan Cup, the Maroons lost to the Port Arthur Bearcats in the quarterfinals.

The Maroons advanced to the Allan Cup national finals for the first time in 1961, where they lost to the Eastern Canada champion Galt Terriers at the 1961 Allan Cup. To become the Western Canada champion that year, the Maroons defeated the Port Arthur Bearcats, Moose Jaw Pla-Mors and Nelson Maple Leafs in the Western playdowns.

The 1964 team beat the Woodstock Athletics 4 straight games - 5-0, 7-1, 5-0, and 5-3. It was the Maroons' third appearance in four years in the Allan Cup final. After losing to Galt Terriers in 1962 and Windsor Bulldogs in 1963, they were not to be denied in 1964. The Maroons were overpowering in their championship quest in 1964, winning 12 of their 13 playoff games and outscoring their rivals 79 - 32 with veteran Ross Parke leading the team in scoring with 26 points. Eggie Kukulowicz with 22 points, and Elliot Chorley with 19 points. Another veteran, Chuck Lumsden, scored the winning goal and Ross Parke the last goal of the Allen Cup playoff finals. Two keen Maroon players, Fred Dunsmore and Reg Abbot missed the playoffs due to injuries. This 1964 Maroon Club were true amateurs as no players were paid and home game venues went to Winnipeg charities. The Maroons also played approximately twelve games against the Russian, Czechoslovak, Swedish and USA national teams in Winnipeg. The Maroons held their own against such fine teams even though the players were all from Winnipeg. In 1965, the CAHA asked the team to give up its identity and become Canada's First National Team.

The team roster was: Reg Abbott, Gary Aldcorn, Terry Ball, Sheldon Bloomer, Dick Braun, Ron Castelane, Elliot Chorley, Don Collins, Murray Couch, Mike Daski, Gord Dibley, Fred Dunsmore, Ron Farnfield, Bernie Grebinsky, Al Johnson, Bill Johnson, Lou Joyal, Leo Konyk, Julian Klymkiw, Aggie Kukulowicz, Ron Kullman, Chuck Lumsden, Jim MacKenzie, Tom Marshall, Ross Parke, John Russell, Danny Summers, Terry Hind, President, Bud Holohan (G.M.), Gord Simpson (Coach). The general manager was Charles "Chas" Maddin, father of filmmaker Guy Maddin, who profiled the Maroons in his semi-documentary film My Winnipeg.

The 1964 Winnipeg Maroons team was inducted into both the Manitoba Hockey Hall of Fame, and the Manitoba Sports Hall of Fame and Museum in 2003.

The Canadian Amateur Hockey Association merged the Canada men's national ice hockey team into the Maroons in 1965, and Gord Simpson continued as coach. Father David Bauer who had founded the national team, continued as its manager and saw the merger as the beginning of a truly national team based in the geographic centre of the country.

In 1967, the Maroons relocated to St. Boniface and became the St. Boniface Mohawks.
