= Okanagan Senior League =

Defunct Canadian ice hockey league that operated for 10 seasons

Okanagan Senior Hockey League
Membership	British Columbia Amateur Hockey Association
Founded	1951
Ceased	1961
Allan Cups	2
Olympic Medals	0
World Championship Medals	1

The Okanagan Senior Hockey League (OSHL) is a defunct Canadian ice hockey league that operated for 10 seasons (1951 to 1961) within the Okanagan region of British Columbia. This league is notable as it played hockey at the highest amateur level in North America. This league won two Allan Cups (1953–54 and 1955–56) and a World Championship (1955).

== History ==
In 1951 the Okanagan Mainline League split up into two leagues: the Pacific Coast Senior League and the Okanagan Senior League. The Okanagan Senior League ceased its operations after the 1960-61 season. The league was then replaced by the Okanagan Junior Hockey League, the precursor to the British Columbia Hockey League.

In 1954, the Penticton V's of the Okanagan Senior League won the 1954 Allan Cup, as a result they were invited to represent Canada at the 1955 World Ice Hockey Championships. With an 8-0-0 record, the V's would become 1955 World Champions. Later, when the Vernon Canadians won the 1956 Allan Cup, they elected to not send a team to the World Championships.

== List of champions ==
- 1952 Kelowna Packers
- 1953 Penticton V's
- 1954 Penticton V's
- 1955 Vernon Canadians
- 1956 Vernon Canadians
- 1957 Vernon Canadians
- 1958 Kelowna Packers
- 1959 Vernon Canadians
- 1960 Kelowna Packers
- 1961 Vernon Canadians

== Allan Cup Champions ==
- 1954 Penticton V's
- 1956 Vernon Canadians

== IIHF World Ice Hockey Championships ==
- 1955 Penticton V's
