= 1956 Allan Cup =

Canadian senior ice hockey championship

The Allan Cup trophy

The 1956 Allan Cup was the Canadian senior ice hockey championship for the 1955–56 senior "A" season. The event was hosted by the Vernon Canadians and Vernon, Kelowna, and Kamloops, British Columbia. The 1956 playoff marked the 48th time that the Allan Cup has been awarded.

== Teams ==
- Chatham Maroons (Eastern Canadian Champions)
- Vernon Canadians (Western Canadian Champions)

== Playdowns ==
=== Allan Cup Best-of-Seven Series ===
Chatham Maroons 7 - Vernon Canadians 1
Vernon Canadians 6 - Chatham Maroons 2
Vernon Canadians 7 - Chatham Maroons 1
Vernon Canadians 6 - Chatham Maroons 4
Vernon Canadians 5 - Chatham Maroons 3

=== Eastern Playdowns ===
Semi-final

Chatham Maroons defeated Sudbury Wolves 3-games-to-2 with 2 ties

Chatham Maroons 3 - Sudbury Wolves 1
Chatham Maroons 1 - Sudbury Wolves 1
Sudbury Wolves 4 - Chatham Maroons 1
Chatham Maroons 3 - Sudbury Wolves 3
Chatham Maroons 4 - Sudbury Wolves 2
Sudbury Wolves 3 - Chatham Maroons 1
Chatham Maroons 4 - Sudbury Wolves 1

Final

Chatham Maroons defeated St. John Beavers 4-games-to-1

St. John Beavers 5 - Chatham Maroons 4
Chatham Maroons 6 - St. John Beavers 3
Chatham Maroons 5 - St. John Beavers 3
Chatham Maroons 6 - St. John Beavers 2
Chatham Maroons 5 - St. John Beavers 2

=== Western Playdowns ===
Semi-final

Winnipeg Maroons defeated Fort William Beavers 4-games-to-none

Winnipeg Maroons 3 - Fort William Beavers 2
Winnipeg Maroons 11 - Fort William Beavers 2
Winnipeg Maroons 11 - Fort William Beavers 4
Winnipeg Maroons 4 - Fort William Beavers 1

Final

Vernon Canadians defeated Winnipeg Maroons 4-games-to-none with 1 tie

Vernon Canadians 4 - Winnipeg Maroons 1
Vernon Canadians 5 - Winnipeg Maroons 4
Vernon Canadians 2 - Winnipeg Maroons 2
Vernon Canadians 3 - Winnipeg Maroons 1
Vernon Canadians 7 - Winnipeg Maroons 5
