= Grant Warwick =

Canadian ice hockey player (1921–1999)

- Born: October 11, 1921 Regina, Saskatchewan, Canada
- Died: September 27, 1999 (aged 77) Edmonton, Alberta, Canada
- Height: 5 ft 6 in (168 cm)
- Weight: 155 lb (70 kg; 11 st 1 lb)
- Position: Right wing
- Shot: Right
- Played for: Boston Bruins; Montreal Canadiens; New York Rangers
- National team: Canada
- Playing career: 1942–1958
Medal record
Representing Canada
Men's ice hockey
World Championships
Gold medal – first place	1955 West Germany	Ice Hockey

Grant David "Knobby" Warwick (October 11, 1921 - September 27, 1999) was a professional ice hockey right winger who played 9 seasons in the National Hockey League. He won the Calder Memorial Trophy in 1942. Grant is the brother of Bill Warwick.

== Playing career ==
=== NHL career ===
Born in Regina, Saskatchewan, Warwick started playing with the hometown team Regina Abbots in the Southern Saskatchewan Junior Hockey League. He gradually made his way up to the Regina Rangers of the Southern Saskatchewan Hockey League and won an Allan Cup with the team in 1940–41.

Warwick made his NHL debut with the New York Rangers in 1941–42. In his first season of play, he was awarded the Calder Memorial Trophy for top rookie in the league. In 1947–48 after seven seasons with the Rangers and playing in the 1947 NHL All-Star Game, Warwick was traded to the Boston Bruins for Billy Taylor and future considerations. The Bruins kept Warwick until 1948–49, when he was traded to the Montreal Canadiens. Early in the season in 1949–50, Warwick broke his nose and spent the rest of the season in the American Hockey League with the Buffalo Bisons.

=== OSHL career ===
Warwick would not return to the NHL again. He spent two more seasons with the Bisons before moving on to the Maritime Major Hockey League for one season. The next season, Warwick moved on to the Okanagan Senior Hockey League and played for the Penticton Vees. He had great success with the V's and was selected to the OSHL First All-Star Team four times in his four seasons of play. Warwick also won his second Allan Cup in 1953–54 with the V's.

In 1955, the Penticton Vees were chosen to represent Team Canada at the World Ice Hockey Championships. Warwick at the time was a player and also the coach. The Vees made it all the way to the gold medal game where they faced off against the Soviet Union. Warwick and his team beat the Soviet Union 5–0 to win the gold medal.

After the gold medal victory, Warwick spent one more season with the Vees before moving on with the Trail Smoke Eaters of the Western International Hockey League. He stayed in Trail for only one season before returning to the OSHL. Warwick would retire after playing 49 games with the Kamloops Chiefs.

== Awards and achievements ==
- Allan Cup champion in 1941 and 1954.
- Calder Memorial Trophy winner in 1942.
- Played in 1947 NHL All-Star Game.
- Selected to the OSHL First All-Star Team in 1953, 1954, 1955, and 1956.
- Inducted into the Saskatchewan Sports Hall of Fame.
- Inducted into the Regina Sports Hall of Fame.

== Career statistics ==
=== Regular season and playoffs ===
			Regular season					Playoffs
Season	Team	League	GP	G	A	Pts	PIM	GP	G	A	Pts	PIM
1938–39	Regina Abbotts	S-SJHL	4	0	0	0	2	—	—	—	—	—
1939–40	Regina Abbotts	S-SJHL	11	0	0	0	0	2	2	4	6	11
1939–40	Regina Abbotts	M-Cup	—	—	—	—	—	6	2	4	6	12
1940–41	Regina Rangers	SSHL	31	14	18	32	16	8	5	1	6	2
1940–41	Regina Rangers	Al-Cup	—	—	—	—	—	14	6	9	15	8
1941–42	New York Rangers	NHL	44	16	17	33	36	6	0	1	1	2
1942–43	New York Rangers	NHL	50	17	18	35	31	—	—	—	—	—
1943–44	New York Rangers	NHL	18	8	9	17	14	—	—	—	—	—
1944–45	New York Rangers	NHL	42	20	22	42	25	—	—	—	—	—
1945–46	New York Rangers	NHL	45	19	18	37	19	—	—	—	—	—
1946–47	New York Rangers	NHL	54	20	20	40	24	—	—	—	—	—
1947–48	New York Rangers	NHL	40	17	12	29	30	—	—	—	—	—
1947–48	Boston Bruins	NHL	18	6	5	11	8	5	0	3	3	4
1948–49	Boston Bruins	NHL	58	22	15	37	14	5	2	0	2	0
1949–50	Montreal Canadiens	NHL	26	2	6	8	19	—	—	—	—	—
1949–50	Buffalo Bisons	AHL	37	19	28	47	33	3	2	0	2	0
1950–51	Buffalo Bisons	AHL	65	34	65	99	43	4	2	1	3	2
1951–52	Buffalo Bisons	AHL	55	24	41	65	35	3	0	0	0	2
1951–52	Halifax St. Mary's	MMHL	—	—	—	—	—	5	1	0	1	2
1952–53	Penticton Vees	OSL	31	19	27	46	49	11	7	8	15	15
1952–53	Penticton Vees	Al-Cup	—	—	—	—	—	18	8	13	21	16
1953–54	Penticton Vees	OSL	54	36	43	79	79	10	11	7	18	8
1953–54	Penticton Vees	Al-Cup	—	—	—	—	—	23	16	30	46	28
1954–55	Penticton Vees	OSL	38	22	34	56	62	—	—	—	—	—
1955–56	Penticton Vees	OSL	54	54	59	113	44	7	5	3	8	16
1956–57	Trail Smoke Eaters	WIHL	43	18	30	48	70	8	5	5	10	8
1957–58	Kamloops Chiefs	OSL	49	9	31	40	45	15	1	13	14	14
NHL totals			395	147	142	289	220	16	2 !4	6	6

=== International ===
Year	Team	Event	GP	G	A	Pts	PIM
1955	Canada	WC	8	6	11	17	5

Preceded by Johnny Quilty	Winner of the Calder Memorial Trophy; 1942	Succeeded by Gaye Stewart
