= George McAvoy =

Canadian ice hockey player

- Born: June 21, 1931; Edmonton, Alberta, Canada
- Died: May 14, 1998 (aged 66)
- Height: 6 ft 0 in (183 cm)
- Weight: 185 lb (84 kg; 13 st 3 lb)
- Position: Defence
- Shot: Left
- Played for: Montreal Canadiens
- National team: Canada
- Playing career: 1951–1966

George Douglas McAvoy (June 21, 1931 – May 14, 1998) was a Canadian professional ice hockey defenceman who played four playoff games in the National Hockey League for the Montreal Canadiens during the 1954–55 season. The rest of his career, which lasted from 1951 to 1966, was spent in the minor leagues. McAvoy also played for the Canadian national team at the 1955 World Championships, winning a gold medal.

McAvoy was born in Edmonton, Alberta. He died on May 14, 1998.

== Career statistics ==
=== Regular season and playoffs ===
| | | | Regular season | | | | | Playoffs |
| Season | Team | League | GP | G | A | Pts | PIM | GP | G | A | Pts | PIM |
|---|---|---|---|---|---|---|---|---|---|---|---|---|
| 1947–48 | Edmonton Athletic Club | EJrHL | 17 | 2 | 3 | 5 | 6 | 4 | 0 | 0 | 0 | 4 |
| 1948–49 | Edmonton Athletic Club | EJrHL | 17 | 6 | 9 | 15 | 41 | 6 | 2 | 1 | 3 | 17 |
| 1948–49 | Edmonton Athletic Club | M-Cup | — | — | — | — | — | 8 | 1 | 5 | 6 | 10 |
| 1949–50 | Laval Titan | QJHL | 36 | 2 | 6 | 8 | 73 | 7 | 1 | 1 | 2 | 15 |
| 1950–51 | Montreal Junior Canadiens | QJHL | 41 | 7 | 12 | 19 | 54 | 9 | 1 | 1 | 2 | 18 |
| 1951–52 | Halifax St. Mary's | MMHL | 6 | 0 | 0 | 0 | 4 | — | — | — | — | — |
| 1951–52 | Boston Olympics | EAHL | 61 | 4 | 18 | 22 | 153 | 4 | 0 | 2 | 2 | 9 |
| 1952–53 | Penticton Vees | OSHL | 44 | 9 | 5 | 14 | 162 | 10 | 1 | 1 | 2 | 16 |
| 1952–53 | Penticton Vees | Al-Cup | — | — | — | — | — | 18 | 4 | 6 | 10 | 70 |
| 1953–54 | Penticton Vees | OSHL | 61 | 11 | 24 | 35 | 265 | 10 | 1 | 5 | 6 | 12 |
| 1953–54 | Penticton Vees | Al-Cup | — | — | — | — | — | 23 | 4 | 2 | 6 | 28 |
| 1954–55 | Penticton Vees | OSHL | 53 | 8 | 26 | 34 | 122 | — | — | — | — | — |
| 1954–55 | Montreal Canadiens | NHL | — | — | — | — | — | 4 | 0 | 0 | 0 | 0 |
| 1955–56 | Providence Reds | AHL | 60 | 4 | 19 | 23 | 131 | 9 | 1 | 7 | 8 | 25 |
| 1956–57 | Providence Reds | AHL | 64 | 3 | 27 | 30 | 141 | 5 | 1 | 0 | 1 | 9 |
| 1957–58 | Providence Reds | AHL | 25 | 2 | 10 | 12 | 45 | 5 | 0 | 0 | 0 | 10 |
| 1958–59 | New Westminster Royals | WHL | 11 | 0 | 4 | 4 | 18 | — | — | — | — | — |
| 1958–59 | Cleveland Barons | AHL | 59 | 6 | 24 | 30 | 99 | 7 | 0 | 3 | 3 | 14 |
| 1959–60 | Cleveland Barons | AHL | 72 | 6 | 21 | 27 | 124 | 7 | 0 | 0 | 0 | 14 |
| 1960–61 | Calgary Stampeders | WHL | 70 | 5 | 28 | 33 | 111 | 5 | 0 | 2 | 2 | 10 |
| 1961–62 | Calgary Stampeders | WHL | 70 | 5 | 30 | 35 | 113 | 7 | 0 | 2 | 2 | 13 |
| 1962–63 | Calgary Stampeders | WHL | 70 | 9 | 16 | 25 | 141 | — | — | — | — | — |
| 1964–65 | Edmonton Nuggets | Exhib | — | — | — | — | — | — | — | — | — | — |
| 1965–66 | Edmonton Nuggets | WCSHL | 19 | 3 | 2 | 5 | 23 | — | — | — | — | — |
| AHL totals | | | 280 | 21 | 101 | 122 | 540 | 33 | 2 | 10 | 12 | 72 |
| WHL totals | | | 221 | 19 | 78 | 97 | 383 | 12 | 0 | 4 | 4 | 23 |
| NHL totals | | | — | — | — | — | — | 4 | 0 | 0 | 0 | 0 |

=== International ===
| Year | Team | Event | GP | G | A | Pts | PIM |
|---|---|---|---|---|---|---|---|
| 1955 | Canada | WC | 8 | 2 | 2 | 4 | 14 |
| Senior totals | | | 8 | 2 | 2 | 4 | 14 |
