= Ken Stewart (ice hockey) =

Canadian ice hockey player

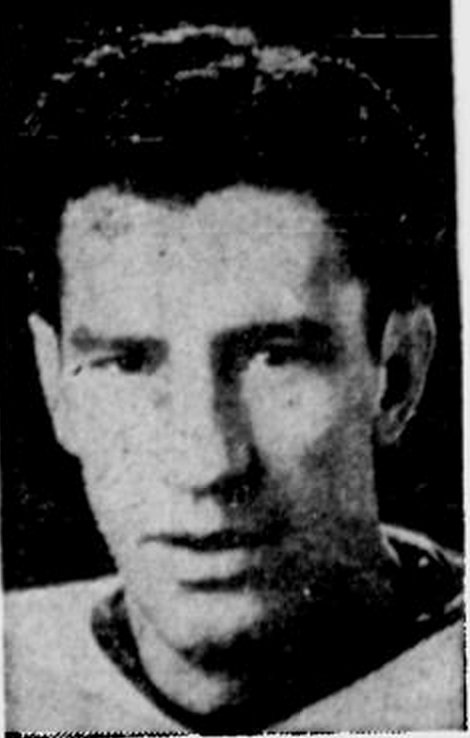
- Born: March 29, 1912; Port Arthur, Ontario, Canada
- Died: April 4, 2002 (aged 90); Chase, British Columbia, Canada
- Height: 6 ft 0 in (183 cm)
- Weight: 175 lb (79 kg; 12 st 7 lb)
- Position: Defence
- Shot: Left
- Played for: Chicago Black Hawks
- Playing career: 1932–1951

Kenneth Lawrence Stewart (March 29, 1912 – April 4, 2002) was a Canadian ice hockey player who played six games in the National Hockey League for the Chicago Black Hawks during the 1941–42 season. The rest of his career, which lasted from 1932 to 1951, was spent in various minor leagues.

== Biography ==
Stewart was born in Port Arthur, Ontario, but grew up in Edmonton, Alberta. He had previously played junior hockey in Edmonton and senior hockey with the Lethbridge Maple Leafs for three seasons, being the highest scoring defenceman for the team in his last season, 1940–41, registering 28 goals and 16 assists. On September 27, 1941, he signed a contract with the Black Hawks of the National Hockey League. In 1946, Stewart was named the playing coach of the Los Angeles Ramblers of the Western International Hockey League. During the season he registered 61 points in 48 games.

During the 1967–68 hockey season of the BCHL, Stewart also served as the coach of the Kamloops Rockets.

== Career statistics ==
=== Regular season and playoffs ===
			Regular season					Playoffs
Season	Team	League	GP	G	A	Pts	PIM	GP	G	A	Pts	PIM
1930–31	Edmonton Strathconas	EJrHL	13	3	2	5	7	2	0	1	1	0
1930–31	Edmonton Strathconas	M-Cup	—	—	—	—	—	2	1	0	1	0
1931–32	Edmonton Strathconas	EJrHL	13	7	1	8	—	—	—	—	—	—
1931–32	Edmonton Superiors	ESrHL	1	0	0	0	0	—	—	—	—	—
1932–33	Luscar Indians	ASHL	—	—	—	—	—	—	—	—	—	—
1933–34	Luscar Indians	ASHL	—	—	—	—	—	—	—	—	—	—
1934–35	Cadomin Colts	AIHA	—	—	—	—	—	—	—	—	—	—
1935–36	Luscar Indians	ASHL	—	—	—	—	—	8	3	2	5	4
1936–37	Lethbridge Maple Leafs	ASHL	—	—	—	—	—	—	—	—	—	—
1937–38	Lethbridge Maple Leafs	ASHL	24	13	26	39	2	2	2	2	4	2
1938–39	Lethbridge Maple Leafs	ASHL	31	17	18	35	20	9	7	2	9	4
1939–40	Lethbridge Maple Leafs	ASHL	30	16	12	28	4	2	2	0	2	2
1940–41	Lethbridge Maple Leafs	ASHL	30	28	16	44	2	5	0	1	1	0
1940–41	Lethbridge Maple Leafs	Al-Cup	—	—	—	—	—	10	2	7	9	8
1941–42	Chicago Black Hawks	NHL	6	1	1	2	0	—	—	—	—	—
1941–42	Kansas City Americans	AHA	41	17	25	42	6	5	6	2	8	0
1942–43	Calgary Currie Army	CNDHL	23	13	15	28	16	5	0	2	2	4
1942–43	Calgary Currie Army	Al-Cup	—	—	—	—	—	5	1	2	3	4
1943–44	Calgary Currie Army	CNDHL	15	5	2	7	6	2	1	1	2	0
1944–45	Calgary Currie Army	CNDHL	15	8	7	15	0	—	—	—	—	—
1945–46	Regina Capitals	WCSHL	23	15	16	31	16	—	—	—	—	—
1946–47	Los Angeles Ramblers	WIHL	48	26	35	61	14	—	—	—	—	—
1947–48	Calgary Stampeders	WCSHL	47	14	22	36	20	11	1	2	3	4
1949–50	Kelowna Packers	OSHL	19	10	10	20	14	—	—	—	—	—
1950–51	Kamloops Elks	OSHL	52	24	31	55	11	5	3	1	4	4
NHL totals			6	1	1	2	0	—	—	—	—	—
