= Bill Warwick =

Canadian ice hockey player

- Born: November 17, 1924 Regina, Saskatchewan, Canada
- Died: October 3, 2007 (aged 82) Edmonton, Alberta, Canada
- Height: 5 ft 8 in (173 cm)
- Weight: 165 lb (75 kg; 11 st 11 lb)
- Position: Left wing
- Shot: Left
- Played for: New York Rangers
- National team: Canada
- Playing career: 1942–1957

William Harvey "The Dapper Yapper" Warwick (November 17, 1924 – October 3, 2007) was a Canadian professional ice hockey forward. He played 14 games in the National Hockey League with the New York Rangers during the 1942–43 and 1943–44 seasons. The rest of his career, which lasted from 1942 to 1958, was spent in the minor leagues He was inducted into the Saskatchewan Sports Hall of Fame and Museum.

== Playing career ==
Born in Regina, Saskatchewan, Warwick was one of three hockey-playing brothers which included Dick and Grant. Sister Mildred played in the All-American Girls Professional Baseball League for the Rockford Peaches. Warwick began his hockey career with the Regina Abbotts. Most of his pro hockey career was spent in the minors, but he also played 14 games with the National Hockey League New York Rangers during the 1942 and 1944 season seasons. He had three goals and three assists with the Rangers.

All three Warwick brothers played on the Penticton Vees when they won the world men's hockey championship for Canada in 1955. Warwick said of the victory, "Boy, this was better than winning the Stanley Cup." During the championship game, Warwick scored two goals as the Canadian team decisively beat the Soviet Union 5–0. Warwick was named the tournament's top forward.

After he retired from hockey, Warwick opened a restaurant in Edmonton.

== Career statistics ==
=== Regular season and playoffs ===
			Regular season					Playoffs
Season	Team	League	GP	G	A	Pts	PIM	GP	G	A	Pts	PIM
1941–42	Regina Abbotts	S-SJHL	10	1	3	4	8	5	4	1	5	2
1941–42	Regina Abbotts	M-Cup	—	—	—	—	—	9	5	4	9	13
1942–43	New York Rangers	NHL	1	0	1	1	4	—	—	—	—	—
1942–43	New York Rovers	EAHL	43	26	29	55	47	10	9	4	13	6
1943–44	New York Rangers	NHL	13	3	2	5	12	—	—	—	—	—
1943–44	Brooklyn Crescents	EAHL	2	0	1	1	0	11	7	11	18	28
1943–44	New York Rovers	EAHL	27	14	14	28	34	11	7	9	16	12
1944–45	Hershey Bears	AHL	40	10	7	17	26	6	0	0	0	0
1944–45	New York Rovers	EAHL	1	2	1	3	2	—	—	—	—	—
1945–46	Pittsburgh Hornets	AHL	8	0	4	4	14	—	—	—	—	—
1945–46	Providence Reds	AHL	34	14	9	23	20	2	0	0	0	2
1946–47	Providence Reds	AHL	18	4	8	12	22	—	—	—	—	—
1946–47	Philadelphia Rockets	AHL	46	21	19	40	20	—	—	—	—	—
1947–48	Springfield Indians	AHL	3	0	0	0	2	—	—	—	—	—
1947–48	Fort Worth Rangers	USHL	46	23	15	38	41	4	1	1	2	2
1948–49	Springfield Indians	AHL	14	3	4	7	10	—	—	—	—	—
1948–49	Fort Worth Rangers	USHL	52	32	27	59	30	2	1	0	1	15
1949–50	Minneapolis Millers	USHL	70	35	46	81	47	7	3	0	3	4
1949–50	Cleveland Barons	AHL	—	—	—	—	—	2	0	3	3	2
1950–51	Denver Falcons	USHL	40	13	23	36	20	—	—	—	—	—
1951–52	Ottawa Senators	QSHL	28	0	3	3	30	—	—	—	—	—
1951–52	Halifax St. Mary's	MMHL	39	17	24	41	18	9	3	2	5	20
1952–53	Penticton Vees	OSHL	38	21	34	55	82	11	3	11	14	35
1952–53	Penticton Vees	Al-Cup	—	—	—	—	—	18	9	11	20	73
1953–54	Penticton Vees	OSHL	58	50	45	95	127	10	8	6	14	28
1953–54	Penticton Vees	Al-Cup	—	—	—	—	—	24	8	16	24	60
1954–55	Penticton Vees	OSHL	54	36	37	73	168	—	—	—	—	—
1955–56	Penticton Vees	OSHL	49	32	44	76	210	—	—	—	—	—
1956–57	Trail Smoke Eaters	WIHL	45	27	34	61	166	9	2	5	7	44
1957–58	Kamloops Chiefs	OSHL	47	17	28	45	148	8	2	5	7	10
OSHL totals			246	156	188	344	735	29	13	22	35	73
USHL totals			208	103	111	214	138	13	5	1	6	21
NHL totals			14	3	3	6	16	—	—	—	—	—

=== International ===
Year	Team	Event	GP	G	A	Pts	PIM
1955	Canada	WC	8	14	8	22	12
Senior totals			8	14	8	22	12
