= Spokane Spartans =

The Spokane Spartans are a defunct senior men's ice hockey team from Spokane, Washington. They played in the Western International Hockey League for two seasons, between 1946-47 and 1947-48.

Coached by Rene Morin and Joe Benoit, the Spartans played a total of 40 games during their two seasons in the WIHL, compiling a record of 10 wins and 30 losses.

The Spartans were replaced in the 1948-49 season by the Spokane Flyers.

== 1946-47 roster ==
The Spartan's 1946-47 roster included Al LaFace (goalie); Jack McLeod and Lorne Nadeau (defense); Bob Proulx (centre); and George Edwards and Bill Haldane (wingers).

== Notable players ==
- Reg Bentley
