= Swimming at the 2002 Commonwealth Games – Women's 200 metre breaststroke =

Women's 200 metre breaststroke at the 2002 Commonwealth Games
- Venue: Manchester Aquatics Centre
- Dates: 1 August 2002
- Competitors: 14 from 10 nations
- Winning time: 2:25.93

Medalists
gold medal	Leisel Jones	Australia
silver medal	Sarah Poewe	South Africa
bronze medal	Kelli Waite	Australia

The women's 200 metre breaststroke event at the 2002 Commonwealth Games was held on 1 August at the Manchester Aquatics Centre.

== Records ==
Prior to this competition, the existing world record was as follows.

World record	(China) Qi Hui (CHN)	2:22.99	Hangzhou, China	13 April 2001

== Results ==
=== Heats ===
Both heats were held on 1 August.

Rank	Heat	Lane	Name	Nationality	Time	Notes
1	2	4	Leisel Jones	Australia	2:27.30	Q
2	2	5	Kelli Waite	Australia	2:29.23	Q
3	1	4	Sarah Poewe	South Africa	2:29.86	Q
4	2	6	Brooke Hanson	Australia	2:30.60	Q
5	1	3	Heidi Earp	England	2:31.01	Q
6	1	5	Jaime King	England	2:31.23	Q
7	2	3	Christin Petelski	Canada	2:32.15	Q
8	1	2	Rhiannon Leier	Canada	2:32.82	Q
9	1	6	Kirsty Balfour	Scotland	2:32.87	
10	2	2	Siow Yi Ting	Malaysia	2:34.29	
11	2	7	Annamay Pierse	Canada	2:34.72	
12	1	7	Natalie Bree	Jersey	2:43.06	
13	1	1	Gail Strobridge	Guernsey	2:47.11	
14	2	1	Rachel Ah Koy	Fiji	2:49.40	

=== Final ===
The final was held on 1 August.

Rank	Lane	Name	Nationality	Time	Notes
1st place, gold medalist(s)	4	Leisel Jones	Australia	2:25.93	
2nd place, silver medalist(s)	3	Sarah Poewe	South Africa	2:27.47	
3rd place, bronze medalist(s)	5	Kelli Waite	Australia	2:28.58	
4	6	Brooke Hanson	Australia	2:29.55	
5	2	Heidi Earp	England	2:30.45	
6	8	Rhiannon Leier	Canada	2:31.33	
7	7	Jaime King	England	2:31.58	
8	1	Christin Petelski	Canada	2:33.09	
