= Marcel Pelletier =

Marcel Pelletier may refer to:

- Marcel Pelletier (athlete) (1888–?), Luxembourgian track and field athlete
- Marcel Pelletier (ice hockey) (1927–2017), Canadian ice hockey goaltender
