= Jim Bedard =

Jim Bedard may refer to:

- Jim Bedard (ice hockey, born 1927) (1927–1994), Canadian ice hockey player
- Jim Bedard (ice hockey, born 1956), Canadian ice hockey player
