= Edward Leier =

Canadian baseball and ice hockey player (1927–2022)

- Born: 3 November 1927 Rovno, Poland
- Died: 25 November 2022 (aged 95)
- Height: 5 ft 11 in (180 cm)
- Weight: 175 lb (79 kg; 12 st 7 lb)
- Position: Centre
- Shot: Right
- Played for: Saskatoon Quakers; Chicago Black Hawks; Kansas City Mohawks; Milwaukee Sea Gulls; Vancouver Canucks; Springfield Indians
- Playing career: 1948–1956

Edward Leier (3 November 1927 – 25 November 2022) was a Polish-born Canadian baseball player, track athlete, and ice hockey player. He played two seasons with the Chicago Black Hawks of the National Hockey League. He was named to the Manitoba Junior Hockey League Second All-Star Team in 1948. On 29 September 1948 he signed as a free agent to the Saskatoon Quakers of the Western Canada Senior Hockey League. Leier grew up in Winnipeg, Manitoba.

Leier played baseball for several years, and in 1950 was an all-star in the ManDak League. He was inducted into the Manitoba Baseball Hall of Fame in 2000, noted for his fielding, batting average, and baserunning. Leier was also Manitoba's provincial champion in 100 and 200 yard dashes. He was the grandfather of Canadian Olympic swimmer Rhiannon Leier. Leier died in November 2022, at the age of 95.

== Career statistics ==
=== Regular season and playoffs ===
			Regular season					Playoffs
Season	Team	League	GP	G	A	Pts	PIM	GP	G	A	Pts	PIM
1945–46	Winnipeg Rangers	MAHA	—	—	—	—	—	—	—	—	—	—
1946–47	Winnipeg Rangers	MJHL	15	16	8	24	0	2	2	0	2	0
1947–48	Winnipeg Black Hawks	MJHL	19	12	10	22	2	—	—	—	—	—
1947–48	Winnipeg Nationals	WSrHL	2	3	2	5	0	—	—	—	—	—
1948–49	Saskatoon Quakers	WCSHL	25	3	17	20	4	—	—	—	—	—
1949–50	Chicago Black Hawks	NHL	5	0	1	1	0	—	—	—	—	—
1949–50	Kansas City Mohawks	USHL	59	19	21	40	2	3	1	1	2	0
1950–51	Chicago Black Hawks	NHL	11	2	0	2	2	—	—	—	—	—
1950–51	Milwaukee Sea Gulls	USHL	17	6	4	10	6	—	—	—	—	—
1951–52	Vancouver Canucks	PCHL	61	18	37	55	2	—	—	—	—	—
1952–53	Vancouver Canucks	WHL	59	10	27	37	9	9	1	1	2	0
1953–54	Springfield Indians	QHL	56	14	27	41	10	—	—	—	—	—
1953–54	Syracuse Warriors	AHL	17	5	6	11	2	—	—	—	—	—
1954–55	Springfield Indians	AHL	59	14	46	60	8	4	0	2	2	0
1955–56	Springfield Indians	AHL	62	9	48	57	14	—	—	—	—	—
AHL totals			138	28	100	128	24	4	0	2	2	0
NHL totals			16	2	1	3	2	—	—	—	—	—
