= Ivan McLelland =

Canadian ice hockey player

- Born: March 15, 1931 (age 95) South Porcupine, Ontario, Canada
- Height: 5 ft 8 in (173 cm)
- Weight: 160 lb (73 kg; 11 st 6 lb)
- Position: Goaltender
- Shot: Left
- Played for: Penticton Vees
- National team: Canada
- Playing career: 1946–1957
Medal record
Men's ice hockey
Gold medal – first place	1955 West Germany	Ice hockey

Ivan Harold McLelland (born March 15, 1931) was a Canadian ice hockey player with the Penticton Vees. He won a gold medal at the 1955 World Ice Hockey Championships in West Germany. In 2005, he was inducted into the BC Sports Hall of Fame and Museum. He was born in South Porcupine, Ontario (now part of Timmins, Ontario).

At the 1955 IIHF world championship tournament, McLelland was outstanding. He recorded four shutouts for Canada, including a 5-0 whitewash of the Soviet Union in the game that decided the tournament's winner.
