= Jack Forsey =

Canadian ice hockey player

- Born: November 17, 1913 Swift Current, Saskatchewan, Canada
- Died: January 1, 1998 (aged 84) Salmon Arm, British Columbia, Canada
- Height: 5 ft 11 in (180 cm)
- Weight: 170 lb (77 kg; 12 st 2 lb)
- Position: Right wing
- Shot: Right
- Played for: Toronto Maple Leafs; Earls Court Rangers
- National team: Canada
- Playing career: 1933–1950

Herbert Jack Forsey (November 17, 1913 – January 1, 1998) was a Canadian ice hockey player who played 19 games in the National Hockey League for the Toronto Maple Leafs during the 1942–43 season. The rest of his career, which lasted from 1933 to 1950, was spent in various minor leagues. Internationally he played for the Canadian national team at the 1937 World Championships.

== Career statistics ==
=== Regular season and playoffs ===
			Regular season					Playoffs
Season	Team	League	GP	G	A	Pts	PIM	GP	G	A	Pts	PIM
1931–32	Calgary Jimmies	CCJHL	7	3	1	4	12	3	0	2	2	4
1931–32	Calgary Jimmies	M-Cup	—	—	—	—	—	8	2	1	3	0
1932–33	Calgary Jimmies	CCJHL	5	4	6	10	6	—	—	—	—	—
1932–33	Calgary Jimmies	M-Cup	—	—	—	—	—	7	6	4	10	11
1933–34	Nelson Red Wings	WKHL	7	2	4	6	5	1	1	0	1	0
1934–35	Kimberley Dynamiters	WKHL	7	3	5	8	7	9	6	4	10	8
1934–35	Kimberley Dynamiters	Al-Cup	—	—	—	—	—	6	3	2	5	4
1935–36	Kimberley Dynamiters	WKHL	7	4	5	9	9	4	4	0	4	0
1936–37	Earls Court Rangers	ENL	—	39	20	59	8	11	7	11	18	28
1937–38	Earls Court Rangers	ENL	—	15	14	29	—	—	—	—	—	—
1938–39	Earls Court Rangers	ENL	—	34	18	52	—	—	—	—	—	—
1939–40	Sherbrooke Red Raiders	QPHL	41	29	54	83	45	7	5	9	14	2
1939–40	Sherbrooke Red Raiders	Al-Cup	—	—	—	—	—	2	3	6	9	2
1940–41	Cornwall Flyers	QSHL	36	14	17	31	16	4	2	0	2	2
1941–42	Providence Reds	AHL	52	19	27	46	10	—	—	—	—	—
1942–43	Toronto Maple Leafs	NHL	19	7	9	16	10	3	0	1	1	0
1942–43	Providence Reds	AHL	33	18	20	38	2	—	—	—	—	—
1943–44	Red Deer Wranglers	WCSHL	16	8	9	17	0	5	0	2	2	0
1945–46	Tulsa Oilers	USHL	11	1	3	4	0	—	—	—	—	—
1945–46	Regina Capitals	WCSHL	16	6	8	14	4	—	—	—	—	—
1946–47	Kimberley Dynamiters	WIHL	36	18	24	42	8	4	3	3	6	0
1946–47	Kimberley Dynamiters	Al-Cup	—	—	—	—	—	5	1	2	3	0
1947–48	Saskatoon Quakers	WCSHL	7	2	1	3	0	—	—	—	—	—
1947–48	Swift Current Indians	SIHA	—	—	—	—	—	—	—	—	—	—
1948–49	Kimberley Dynamiters	WIHL	6	2	2	4	0	—	—	—	—	—
1949–50	Kamloops Elks	OSHL	33	20	21	41	4	7	1	3	4	0
NHL totals			19	7	9	16	10	3	0	1	1	0

=== International ===
Year	Team	Event	GP	G	A	Pts	PIM
1937	Canada	WC	7	8	3	11	2
Senior totals			7	8	3	11	2
