= Emil Hanson =

Canadian ice hockey player (1907–1955)

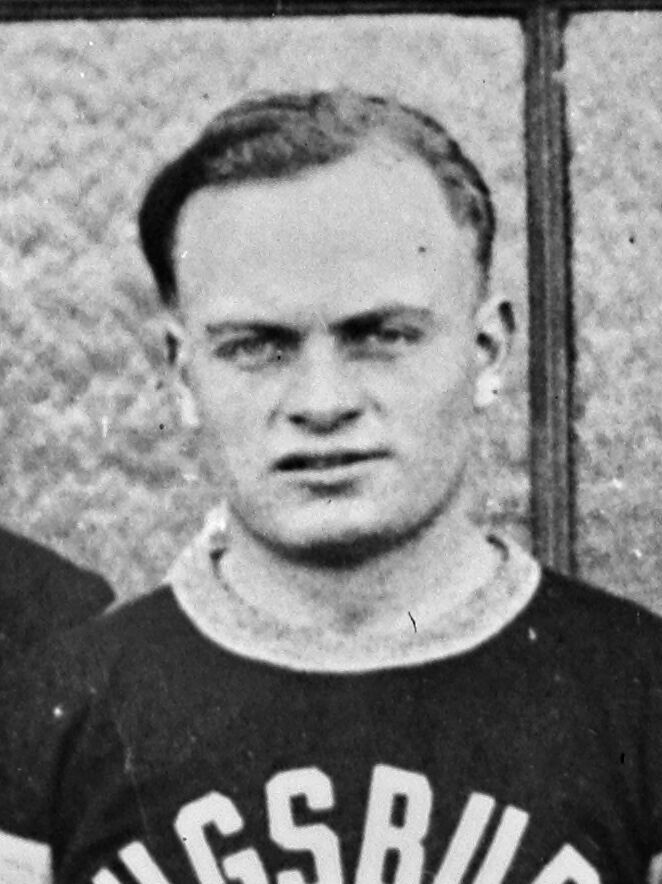
- Born: November 18, 1907 Camrose, Alberta, Canada
- Died: May 16, 1955 (aged 47)
- Height: 5 ft 8 in (173 cm)
- Weight: 165 lb (75 kg; 11 st 11 lb)
- Position: Right wing
- Shot: Left
- Played for: Detroit Red Wings
- Playing career: 1929–1944

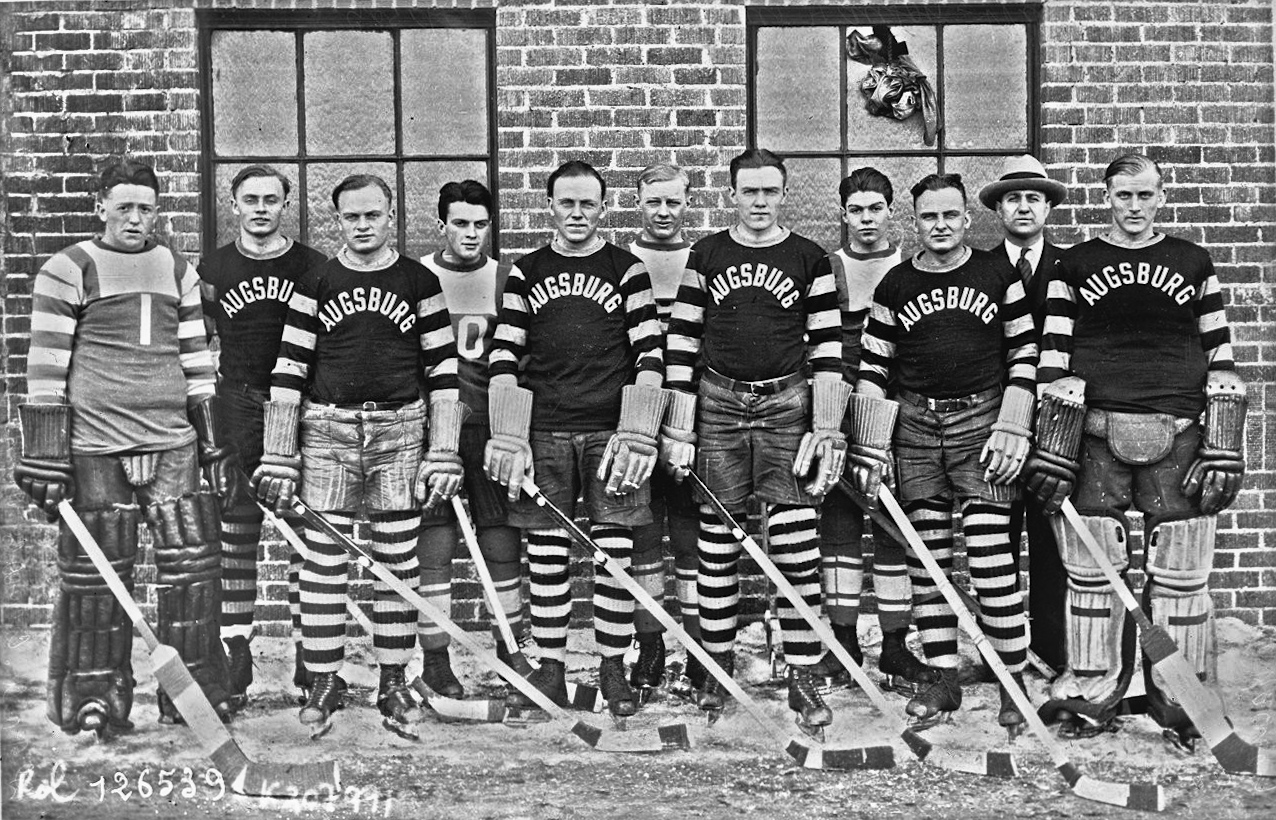
Emil Hanson, 3rd from left, with his brothers and the American national team for the 1928 Winter Olympics, though Hanson did not play at there.

Emil Clarence Hansen (Hanson) (November 18, 1907 – May 16, 1955) was a Canadian professional ice hockey defenceman. He played in seven games in the National Hockey League games for the Detroit Red Wings during the 1932–33 season. The rest of his career, which lasted from 1929 to 1944, was mainly spent in the American Hockey Association. Emil had five brothers who were also ice hockey players: Julius, Joe, Louis, Emery and Oscar Hanson.

== Career statistics ==
=== Regular season and playoffs ===
			Regular season					Playoffs
Season	Team	League	GP	G	A	Pts	PIM	GP	G	A	Pts	PIM
1927–28	Augsburg University	NCAA III	—	—	—	—	—	—	—	—	—	—
1928–29	Tulsa Oilers	AHA	1	0	0	0	0	—	—	—	—	—
1929–30	Tulsa Oilers	AHA	34	6	1	7	23	9	0	0	0	6
1930–31	Tulsa Oilers	AHA	47	5	9	14	64	4	1	1	2	2
1931–32	Tulsa Oilers	AHA	48	9	12	21	39	—	—	—	—	—
1932–33	Detroit Olympics	IHL	30	5	4	9	17	—	—	—	—	—
1932–33	Detroit Red Wings	NHL	7	0	0	0	6	—	—	—	—	—
1933–34	Kansas City Greyhounds	AHA	48	6	11	17	25	3	1	1	2	4
1934–35	St. Paul Saints	CHL	46	17	14	31	50	8	3	1	4	8
1935–36	St. Paul Saints	AHA	46	7	16	23	36	5	1	0	1	2
1936–37	St. Paul Saints	AHA	46	6	5	11	23	3	1	0	1	4
1937–38	Wichita Skyhawks	AHA	47	6	9	15	20	4	1	0	1	2
1938–39	St. Paul Saints	AHA	43	11	14	25	14	3	0	0	0	0
1939–40	St. Paul Saints	AHA	46	4	9	13	20	7	1	2	3	0
1940–41	Minneapolis Millers	AHA	26	0	2	2	16	3	0	1	1	0
1941–42	Minneapolis Millers	AHA	46	4	4	8	10	—	—	—	—	—
1943–44	Edmonton Victorias	ESrHL	—	—	—	—	—	3	1	0	1	4
AHA totals			478	64	92	156	290	41	6	5	11	20
NHL totals			7	0	0	0	0	—	—	—	—	—
