= Yip Radley =

Canadian ice hockey player (1908–1963)

- Born: June 27, 1908 Ottawa, Ontario, Canada
- Died: April 19, 1963 (aged 54) Ottawa, Ontario, Canada
- Height: 6 ft 0 in (183 cm)
- Weight: 2,198 lb (997 kg; 157 st 0 lb)
- Position: Defence
- Shot: Left
- Played for: Montreal Maroons; New York Americans
- Playing career: 1930–1942

Harry John "Yip" Radley (June 27, 1908 – April 19, 1963) was a Canadian professional ice hockey player who played 18 games in the National Hockey League for the New York Americans and Montreal Maroons between 1930 and 1937. A member of the Mann Cup winning Ottawa Emmetts lacrosse team, he also played Canadian football for Ottawa, before choosing hockey for a career, which he played between 1930 and 1942.

== Personal life ==
Radley married Margaret Bradley in 1936 in Tulsa, Oklahoma, while playing for the Tulsa Oilers, and had one son, Peter. Upon retirement, Yip moved to Kingston, Ontario, where he became the athletic director for Alcan, Kingston Works, a position he held until his untimely death in 1963. Funerals were held in both Ottawa (St Joseph's RC Church - Sandy Hill) and Kingston (St. Mary's Cathedral) and he was buried in the Radley family plot with his parents and brother in Notre Dame Cemetery, Ottawa. In 2017, Yip Radley was inducted into the Kingston and District Sports Hall of Fame.

== Career statistics ==
=== Regular season and playoffs ===
			Regular season					Playoffs
Season	Team	League	GP	G	A	Pts	PIM	GP	G	A	Pts	PIM
1926–27	Ottawa Rideaus	OCHL	14	1	2	3	—	—	—	—	—	—
1927–28	Ottawa Rideaus	OCHL	4	0	0	0	—	—	—	—	—	—
1928–29	Ottawa Montagnards	OCHL	15	2	1	3	—	—	—	—	—	—
1929–30	Ottawa Montagnards	OCHL	20	3	1	4	57	6	3	1	4	20
1930–31	New York Americans	NHL	1	0	0	0	0	—	—	—	—	—
1930–31	New Haven Eagles	Can-Am	34	1	2	3	77	—	—	—	—	—
1931–32	New Haven Eagles	Can-Am	39	4	0	4	26	2	0	0	0	0
1932–33	New Haven Eagles	Can-Am	27	1	0	1	34	—	—	—	—	—
1933–34	Cleveland Indians	IHL	43	4	6	10	92	—	—	—	—	—
1934–35	Cleveland Falcons	IHL	5	0	0	0	4	—	—	—	—	—
1934–35	St. Louis Flyers	AHA	40	6	6	12	63	6	1	1	2	26
1935–36	Tulsa Oilers	AHA	47	5	6	11	72	2	1	1	2	2
1936–37	Montreal Maroons	NHL	17	0	1	1	13	—	—	—	—	—
1936–37	Providence Reds	IAHL	4	1	0	1	0	—	—	—	—	—
1936–37	New Haven Eagles	IAHL	2	0	0	0	0	—	—	—	—	—
1937–38	Tulsa Oilers	AHA	47	0	10	10	68	4	0	1	1	5
1938–39	Kansas City Greyhounds	AHA	10	0	1	1	12	—	—	—	—	—
1938–39	Wichita Skyhawks	AHA	19	4	5	9	8	—	—	—	—	—
1939–40	Wichita Skyhawks	AHA	6	0	1	1	6	—	—	—	—	—
1941–42	Kingston Combines	OHA Sr	16	0	2	2	13	—	—	—	—	—
AHA totals			169	15	29	44	229	12	2	3	5	33
NHL totals			18	0	1	1	13	—	—	—	—	—
