= 1946–47 WIHL season =

North American ice hockey season

The 1946–47 WIHL season was the first season of the Western International Hockey League. The West Kootenay League expanded to Los Angeles and Spokane and changed its name.

== History ==
In 1946, a group of Los Angeles businessmen decided to enter a team in the WIHL. However, after operating the team for one year and losing over $100,000, they decided to end the venture. The Los Angeles team had to guarantee teams from Kimberley, Nelson, Trail, and Spokane all expenses to travel to California, with each club making four trips and playing a doubleheader. During the week the Los Angeles Ramblers would fly up to the Kootenay for return games.

Los Angeles had a second team with Vancouver, Seattle, Portland, and San Francisco in the Pacific Coast Hockey League. Although the quality of hockey played in the WIHL was considered superior to that of the other league, Kimberley, Nelson, and Trail were small towns, and hockey did not appeal to wealthy patrons.

The Los Angeles Ramblers' executive came up with the George Montgomery-Dinah Shore Cup, a trophy donated by a pair from Hollywood. The trophy went to the league champions, with the Kimberley Dynamiters the first team to have their name carved on the cup. The Dynamiters had difficulties winning WIHL title in 1946-47, Kimberley was the only city in the league with natural ice, and never had a home game until December 10, by which time they were buried deep in the WIHL basement.

The Dynamiters' coach, Ralph Redding had real problems that fall, the Dynamiters depended on nearby frozen lakes and sloughs to hold their practices. With place to practice, and the hockey season soon to open, the Dynamiters were forced to set up camp in Nelson for a week; this turned out to be a costly project. The Dynamiters were forced to play their first six games away from home and managed only one win before the ice was available in Kimberley.

It was hard for the Dynamiters but eventually it would be one of the greatest comebacks in the annals of the Kootenay League. The Dynamiters won the league championship in the final weekend of play, and in order to do so they had to defeat the Los Angeles Ramblers twice in a doubleheader played in Kimberley. The Ramblers needed only one tie in Kimberley to be declared champions.

The Dynamiters were closing the gap with a close 6-4 win in the first game. The Dynamiters beat the Ramblers 14-1 in the final game of the regular season, with Jack Forsey collecting four goals. Benny Redisky scored the hat trick in that game, with Gordie Wilson gathering six assists. The Dynamiters finished the season with 18 straight home victories. They had lost only 12 games the entire season and won 24 others.

The league played an unbalanced schedule, with the Dynamiters playing 36 games, the same as Nelson and Trail. Los Angeles participated in 32 games, with Spokane performing in 40 matches. The Kimberley Dynamiters finished with a .667 winning percentage; Los Angeles .657 percent; Trail .514 percent; Nelson .458 percent; and the Spokane Spartans .250 percent. The Spartans managed only ten wins while losing 30 games.

The Dynamiters showed plenty of scoring punch, and ended the regular season with 203 goals while holding the opposition to 112, thanks to the goalkeeping of Arthur "Jakie" Nash, and Sammy Quigley. In a game played at Trail on December 28, 1946, the Dynamiters were leading the Smoke Eaters 15-2, when Lyle "Butch" Swaney unloaded a long shot at the Smokies' netminder, Duke Scodellaro, who in disgust, after stopping the shot, tossed the puck into his own net to make the score 16-2.

Los Angeles Ramblers Coach Kenny Stewart, was the playing coach of the Ramblers, and he moulded together a big, rough team with plenty of experience. Vern Kneeshaw was their number one goalie, with Fred Holger doubling as a spare netminder and general manager. Mayer Flett, Lou Labovich, Jack Lambrecht, and Harvey Barnes formed the Ramblers' defence. At the front, they had Joe Levine, Benny Hayes, Max Labovich, Kenny Stewart, Jack Miller, Hassie Young, Terry Cavanaugh, and Jim Fleming.

Spokane's Spartans, coached by Joe Benoit, had a disappointing season, but had still drawn a large crowd at home. Al Laface, an ex-Dynamiter, was the Spartans' netminder, and received very little support from his defencemen, allowing a league-high 255 goals. Playing for Spokane were Jack Kirk, Louis Corrado, Bob Proulx, Sonny Barchyn, Lorne Nadeau, Dick Hammond, Len McCartney, Wilf Cook, Bill Haldane, Jake McLeod, Bob Gibson, and Steve Pawlecko.

Coach Jimmy Morris had his Smoke Eaters doing quite well until the semi-finals. Duke Scodellaro and Bill Waddell guarded the Smokies' net, with Les Christensen, Sandy Shearer, Jimmy Anderson, and Norm DePaolis looking after the blueline duties. The rest of the team were Ab Cronie, Mike Buckna, Emil Kwasney, Ken Stanton, Ron Gardner, Dave Nicol, Bob "Zeke" Clements, Gordie Robertson, and Hedley Marshall.

The Kimberley team received a bye into the WIHL finals, by virtue of winning the league regular season; and locked horns with the Nelson Maple Leafs for the Savage Cup. The Dynamiters finished the Leafs off in five games in their best-of-five series, winning three, losing one; and one game ended in a tie. The 1946-47 edition of the Kimberley Dynamiters will have to go down in the record book as one of the most gallant Dynamiter hockey teams. Coach Redding elected that year to go along with a rookie defenceman named Bill Jones. Many thought Jones couldn't stand the rough WIHL play, but had underestimated his determination and guts. Bill Jones stayed around for years and was one of the Dynamiters' top performers.

The Dynamiters, paced by the two-goal efforts of Frank "Sully" Sullivan and Sammy Calles, trounced the Leafs 7-3 in the opening game of the finals in Kimberley; before 2,200 fans. Kimberley took the second tilt 6-1, thanks to Sammy Calles' hat trick, and Jack Forsey's two-goal performance. The scene switched to Nelson for the remainder of the series, with the first game ending in a tie. The Maple Leafs held on to a 3-2 victory in the next game, for their only win. The Dynamiters wrapped up the Savage Cup with a thrilling 3-2 win. The Dynamiters had to do it the hard way, with half of their team being injured or ill. Sammy Calles, Lloyd "Sandy" Sanderson, and Gordie Wilson were sidelined with the flu. Jack "Buck" Kavanaugh played, despite the fact he was running an exceptionally high temperature from the same malady. Harry Brown played with a cast on, due to a broken wrist; and Sully Sullivan had a foot injury, with Jack Forsey working under a distinct handicap being banged twice on the same ankle. Redding was forced to rearrange his lineup and came up with a combination of Sullivan, Kavanaugh, and Forsey. Benny Redisky, Pete Clements, and defenceman Harry Brown formed the other forward unit; with Red Dezall the utility forward. Bill Jones, Bill "Tank" Johnston, and Lyle "Butch" Swaney were a tower of strength in front of Jake Nash. Jack Forsey, Buck Kavanaugh, and Bill Jones scored one goal each for the Dynamiters, all coming in the second period; and Jakie Nash kept the pressing Leafs at bay in the third frame.

The Maple Leafs, coached by Len Bicknell, did receive excellent goalkeeping from Jess Seaby. Others on the Leafs' roster were George Barefoot, Steve Krizan, Bill Vickers, Roy Allen, Doug Winlaw, Jack Kilpatrick, Spence Tatchell, Red Koehle, John Fargher, John Arichuk, and John Hyrciuk (no relation to Bill Hyrciuk of Kimberley and Kamloops fame).

== Standings ==
Kimberley Dynamiters	24-12-0	.667	208-188
Los Angeles Ramblers	31-21-0	.596	203-112
Trail Smoke Eaters	18-17-1	.514	173-162
Nelson Maple Leafs	16-19-1	.458	140-147
Spokane Spartans	10-30-0	.250	140-255

Note: Spokane Spartans & Los Angeles Ramblers were not eligible for the Allan Cup.

== Semi final ==
Best of 5

- Nelson 2 Trail 0
- Nelson 3 Trail 2
- Nelson 1 Trail 0

Nelson Maple Leafs beat Trail Smoke Eaters 3 wins to none.

== Final ==
Best of 5

- Kimberley 7 Nelson 3
- Kimberley 6 Nelson 1
- Kimberley 3 Nelson 3
- Nelson 3 Kimberley 2
- Kimberley 3 Nelson 2

Kimberley Dynamiters beat Nelson Maple Leafs 3 wins to 1, 1 tie.

Since this was the only senior league in the province, the Kimberley Dynamiters advanced to the 1946-47 Western Canada Allan Cup Playoffs.

== See also ==
- List of WIHL seasons
