= Hank Blade =

Canadian ice hockey player

- Born: April 28, 1920 Peterborough, Ontario, Canada
- Died: February 8, 2003 (aged 82)
- Height: 6 ft 0 in (183 cm)
- Weight: 182 lb (83 kg; 13 st 0 lb)
- Position: Left wing
- Shot: Left
- Played for: Chicago Black Hawks
- Playing career: 1944–1953

Henry Gordon "Hank" Blade (April 28, 1920 – February 8, 2003) was a Canadian professional ice hockey centre who played 24 games in the National Hockey League with the Chicago Black Hawks during the 1946–47 and 1947–48 seasons. He spent the majority of his career, which lasted from 1939 to 1954, with the Kansas City Pla-Mors of the United States Hockey League. Blade was born in Peterborough, Ontario.

== Career statistics ==
=== Regular season and playoffs ===
			Regular season					Playoffs
Season	Team	League	GP	G	A	Pts	PIM	GP	G	A	Pts	PIM
1939–40	Ottawa Montagnards	OCHL	20	5	0	5	8	7	0	0	0	0
1940–41	Ottawa Montagnards	OCHL	20	12	5	17	2	—	—	—	—	—
1940–41	Ottawa Car Bombers	UOVHL	—	—	—	—	—	2	4	3	7	4
1941–42	Ottawa RCAF Flyers	OCHL	16	7	10	17	6	3	0	1	1	0
1941–42	Ottawa RCAF Flyers	Al-Cup	—	—	—	—	—	2	0	0	0	0
1942–43	Ottawa RCAF Flyers	OCHL	19	10	13	23	6	8	5	1	6	6
1942–43	Vancouver RCAF	NNDHL	14	14	6	20	6	—	—	—	—	—
1942–33	Ottawa RCAF Flyers	Al-Cup	—	—	—	—	—	9	2	8	10	4
1943–44	Vancouver RCAF	NNDHL	—	—	—	—	—	3	4	2	6	4
1944–45	Ottawa Depot #17	OCHL	12	22	21	43	8	—	—	—	—	—
1944–45	Ottawa Senators	QSHL	2	1	3	4	0	—	—	—	—	—
1945–46	Kansas City Pla-Mors	USHL	46	29	36	65	16	12	7	8	15	4
1945–46	Ottawa Senators	QSHL	5	0	2	2	6	—	—	—	—	—
1946–47	Chicago Black Hawks	NHL	18	1	3	4	2	—	—	—	—	—
1946–47	Kansas City Pla-Mors	USHL	38	23	24	47	17	12	4	7	11	4
1947–48	Chicago Black Hawks	NHL	6	1	0	1	0	—	—	—	—	—
1947–48	Pittsburgh Hornets	AHL	7	1	2	3	6	—	—	—	—	—
1947–48	Kansas City Pla-Mors	USHL	51	29	41	70	32	7	0	3	3	0
1948–49	Kansas City Pla-Mors	USHL	54	27	36	63	19	2	0	0	0	0
1949–50	Kansas City Pla-Mors	USHL	66	27	48	75	27	3	0	0	0	0
1950–51	Milwaukee Sea Gulls	USHL	63	26	48	74	34	—	—	—	—	—
1951–52	Calgary Stampeders	PCHL	62	14	27	41	24	—	—	—	—	—
1952–53	Calgary Stampeders	WHL	22	3	6	9	32	—	—	—	—	—
1953–54	Simcoe Gunners	OHA Sr	—	—	—	—	—	—	—	—	—	—
USHL totals			318	161	233	394	145	36	11	18	29	8
NHL totals			24	2	3	5	2	—	—	—	—	—
