= Kelli Waite =

Australian swimmer

Personal information
- Full name: Kelli Waite
- Nationality: Australian
- Born: 22 March 1985 (age 41)
- Height: 1.65 m (5 ft 5 in)
- Weight: 58 kg (128 lb)

Sport
- Sport: Swimming
- Strokes: breaststroke
Medal record
Commonwealth Games
Silver medal – second place	2002 Manchester	200 m breaststroke
- Updated on 16 January 2014

Kelli Waite (born 22 March 1985) is an Australian swimmer.

== Career ==
Waite first competed for Australia at the 2002 Commonwealth Games in Manchester where she won bronze in the 200 metre breaststroke in 2:28.58 finishing behind fellow Australian Leisel Jones.

She competed in the 2002 Pan Pacific Swimming Championships in Yokohama, Japan, making the finals both the 100 and 200 metre breaststroke events.
