= Jersey Devils =

- City: Cherry Hill, New Jersey
- League: EHL
- Operated: 1964–1973
- Home arena: Cherry Hill Arena
- Colors: Red, black, white (1964–1970) Orange, black, white (1970–1973)

Franchise history
- 1955–1964: Philadelphia Ramblers
- 1964–1973: Jersey Devils

Championships
- Playoff championships: 0

The Jersey Devils were a minor professional ice hockey team based in Cherry Hill, New Jersey.

The Devils were formed when the Philadelphia Ramblers, a member of the Eastern Hockey League (EHL), relocated from Philadelphia to Cherry Hill at the end of the 1963–64 season. The Devils played their home games at the Cherry Hill Arena until 1973, when the team folded along with the entire Eastern Hockey League.

The Devils made the playoffs in their first season with 72 points but lost to the Long Island Ducks in the EHL quarterfinals 3–1. The 1966–67 season was the Devils' best season in the EHL where they finished second in the Northern Division with 81 points and made a run to EHL Final where they lost to the reigning EHL champions, the Nashville Dixie Flyers 4–1. The Devils also played in the highest-scoring game in EHL history, a 16–15 win over the Syracuse Blazers on February 24, 1968, at the Cherry Hill Arena before 4,583 fans. The Devils had several notable players suit up for the club throughout their nine year existence.

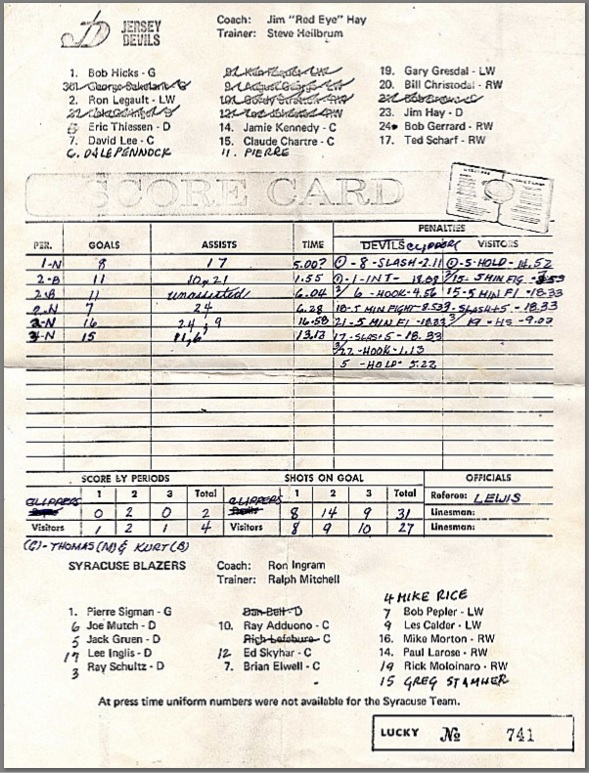
Completed scorecard for a game between the Jersey Devils and Syracuse Blazers in the early 1970s showing the lineups for the two teams.

The EHL split into two fairly short-lived leagues after folding at the end of the 1972–73 season. The Northern teams became the North American Hockey League, while the Southern teams became the Southern Hockey League, however the Devils, who had been the southernmost franchise in the Northern Division of the EHL, did not join either.

== Notable players, coaches and owners ==
- Bobby Taylor, who was later a backup goaltender for the Philadelphia Flyers under Bernie Parent. He later became a color commentator on radio and television hockey broadcasts for the Flyers (1976–1992) and then the Tampa Bay Lightning (1993–2015).
- Dick Sarrazin, who later played for the Philadelphia Flyers and two WHA teams in the late 1960s and early 1970s.
- Marcel Pelletier, a former NHL goaltender, who ended his twenty-year career as a player/coach with the Devils in 1969.
- Rosaire Paiement played the 1966–67 season, scoring 125 points. He later played for the Philadelphia Flyers and Vancouver Canucks in the NHL and for several WHA teams.
- Vic Stasiuk, the Philadelphia Flyers second head coach was head coach of the Devils for two seasons, 1966–68.
- Gary Gresdal, who led the EHL in penalties in 1971–72 with 392 minutes. He played briefly for the Quebec Nordiques in the WHA.
- Larry Pleau, 1968–69 North Division Rookie of the Year who later played several seasons with the Montreal Canadiens. He also appeared for the United States Olympic hockey team in 1968 and the New England Whalers in the WHA before working as their coach and in the front office of the Saint Louis Blues for 13 years.
- Jamie Kennedy, 1970–71 North Division First Team All-Star Center who played briefly for the New York Raiders in the World Hockey Association. He is also a member of the Prince Edward Island Hall of Fame.
- John Brophy, all time EHL career leader in penalty minutes (3822), who played his final season as a Devil in 1972–73. He later coached for one season (1978–79) for Birmingham Bulls of the WHA and three (1986–89) with the Toronto Maple Leafs.
- Jerome Burg, owner and president of the Jersey Devils during the final years from 1971 to 1973. He later moved to Arizona where he became a radio personality.

== Season-by-season record ==
Note: GP = Games played, W = Wins, L = Losses, T = Ties, Pts = Points, GF = Goals for, GA = Goals against, PIM = Penalties in minutes

EHL season	GP	W	L	T	Pts	GF	GA	PIM	Finish	Playoffs
1964–65	72	34	34	4	72	297	312	902	4th in Northern	Lost quarterfinal to Long Island Ducks, 1–3
1965–66	72	25	43	4	54	239	311	733	5th in Northern	Missed playoffs
1966–67	72	39	30	3	81	292	210	1,156	2nd in Northern	Won quarterfinal over Johnstown Jets, 3–2; Won semifinal over Clinton Comets 4–2; Lost final to Nashville Dixie Flyers, 1–4
1967–68	72	17	51	4	38	251	458	1,231	5th in Northern	Missed playoffs
1968–69	72	26	39	7	59	245	301	1,043	5th in Northern	Missed playoffs
1969–70	74	20	48	6	46	278	440	1,183	6th in Northern	Missed playoffs
1970–71	74	22	39	13	57	282	353	0	6th in Northern	Missed playoffs
1971–72	75	25	40	10	60	237	294	1,628	6th in Northern	Missed playoffs
1972–73	76	23	41	12	58	239	300	0	4th in Central	Missed playoffs
