= Ed Diachuk =

Canadian ice hockey player

- Born: August 16, 1936; Vegreville, Alberta, Canada
- Died: December 26, 2017 (aged 81); Langley, British Columbia, Canada
- Height: 6 ft 1 in (185 cm)
- Weight: 185 lb (84 kg; 13 st 3 lb)
- Position: Left wing
- Shot: Left
- Played for: Detroit Red Wings
- Playing career: 1955–1963

Edward Henry Diachuk (August 16, 1936 — December 26, 2017) was a Canadian ice hockey player who played 12 games in the National Hockey League for the Detroit Red Wings during the 1960–61 season. The rest of his career, which lasted from 1955 to 1963, was mainly spent in the minor Western Hockey League.

== Career statistics ==
=== Regular season and playoffs ===
			Regular season					Playoffs
Season	Team	League	GP	G	A	Pts	PIM	GP	G	A	Pts	PIM
1953–54	Edmonton Oil Kings	WJHL	27	4	5	9	17	20	3	2	5	12
1953–54	Edmonton Oil Kings	M-Cup	—	—	—	—	—	13	2	0	2	10
1954–55	Edmonton Oil Kings	WJHL	35	15	12	27	70	5	0	0	0	0
1955–56	Edmonton Oil Kings	WJHL	15	12	8	20	31	6	2	2	4	5
1955–56	Edmonton Flyers	WHL	1	0	0	0	0	—	—	—	—	—
1956–57	Edmonton Oil Kings	CAHL	—	—	—	—	—	—	—	—	—	—
1956–57	Edmonton Flyers	WHL	1	0	0	0	0	—	—	—	—	—
1956–57	Edmonton Oil Kings	M-Cup	—	—	—	—	—	6	1	3	4	20
1957–58	Penticton Vees	OSHL	39	11	9	20	84	5	0	0	0	6
1957–58	Edmonton Flyers	WHL	3	0	0	0	8	—	—	—	—	—
1958–59	Edmonton Flyers	WHL	37	8	13	21	60	1	0	0	0	2
1959–60	Edmonton Flyers	WHL	64	15	12	27	94	4	0	0	0	18
1960–61	Edmonton Flyers	WHL	51	11	18	29	103	—	—	—	—	—
1960–61	Detroit Red Wings	NHL	12	0	0	0	17	—	—	—	—	—
1961–62	Sudbury Wolves	EPHL	28	4	9	13	46	—	—	—	—	—
1961–62	Vancouver Canucks	WHL	19	2	3	5	20	—	—	—	—	—
1962–63	Los Angeles Blades	WHL	55	9	7	16	50	—	—	—	—	—
WHL totals			231	45	54	99	337	5	0	0	0	20
NHL totals			12	0	0	0	17	—	—	—	—	—
