= Marcel Pelletier (ice hockey) =

Canadian ice hockey player

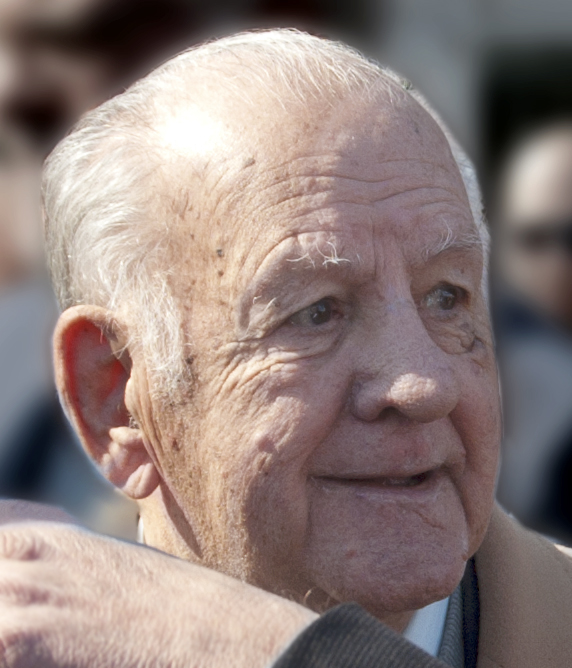
- Pelletier in 2014
- Born: December 6, 1927; Drummondville, Quebec, Canada
- Died: May 13, 2017 (aged 89); Cherry Hill, New Jersey, U.S.
- Height: 5 ft 11 in (180 cm)
- Weight: 175 lb (79 kg; 12 st 7 lb)
- Position: Goaltender
- Caught: Right
- Played for: Chicago Black Hawks; New York Rangers
- Playing career: 1948–1969

Joseph Gérard Marcel Pelletier (December 6, 1927 – May 13, 2017) was a Canadian professional ice hockey goaltender who played eight games in the National Hockey League between 1951 and 1962: six with the Chicago Black Hawks and two with the New York Rangers. He spent the majority of his career, which lasted from 1948 to 1969, with the Victoria Cougars of the Western Hockey League.

After his retirement as a player in 1967, Pelletier spent more than forty years in management and as a scout with the NHL Philadelphia Flyers and Boston Bruins.

Pelletier died on May 13, 2017, at the age of 89.

== Career statistics ==
=== Regular season and playoffs ===
| | | | Regular season | | | | | | | | | Playoffs |
| Season | Team | League | GP | W | L | T | MIN | GA | SO | GAA | SV% | GP | W | L | T | MIN | GA | SO | GAA | SV% |
|---|---|---|---|---|---|---|---|---|---|---|---|---|---|---|---|---|---|---|---|---|
| 1946–47 | Verdun Maple Leafs | QJHL | 24 | 11 | 9 | 4 | 1410 | 79 | 3 | 3.36 | — | 5 | 2 | 3 | 0 | 360 | 23 | 0 | 4.60 | — |
| 1947–48 | Verdun Maple Leafs | QJHL | 15 | 5 | 9 | 1 | 900 | 49 | 1 | 3.27 | — | 3 | 0 | 2 | 1 | 180 | 7 | 0 | 2.33 | — |
| 1948–49 | Kitchener-Waterloo Dutchmen | OHA Sr | 40 | 27 | 11 | 2 | 2380 | 105 | 4 | 2.65 | — | 12 | 6 | 6 | — | 720 | 31 | 1 | 2.58 | — |
| 1949–50 | Quebec Aces | QSHL | 23 | 14 | 8 | 1 | 1410 | 66 | 2 | 2.81 | — | — | — | — | — | — | — | — | — | — |
| 1949–50 | Kansas City Pla-Mors | USHL | 2 | 1 | 1 | 0 | 120 | 12 | 0 | 6.00 | — | — | — | — | — | — | — | — | — | — |
| 1950–51 | Chicago Black Hawks | NHL | 6 | 1 | 5 | 0 | 356 | 28 | 0 | 4.73 | — | — | — | — | — | — | — | — | — | — |
| 1950–51 | Omaha Knights | USHL | 1 | 0 | 0 | 1 | 70 | 5 | 0 | 4.29 | — | — | — | — | — | — | — | — | — | — |
| 1950–51 | Milwaukee Sea Gulls | USHL | 41 | 13 | 23 | 5 | 2506 | 177 | 1 | 4.24 | — | — | — | — | — | — | — | — | — | — |
| 1951–52 | Chicoutimi Sagueneens | QSHL | 46 | 21 | 19 | 6 | 2840 | 139 | 2 | 2.94 | — | 18 | 11 | 7 | — | 1123 | 43 | 3 | 2.30 | — |
| 1952–53 | Chicoutimi Sagueneens | QSHL | 59 | 33 | 15 | 11 | 3680 | 149 | 6 | 2.43 | — | 20 | 11 | 9 | — | 1280 | 53 | 3 | 2.46 | — |
| 1953–54 | Seattle Bombers | WHL | 68 | 22 | 39 | 7 | 4080 | 236 | 2 | 3.47 | — | — | — | — | — | — | — | — | — | — |
| 1954–55 | Victoria Cougars | WHL | 70 | 33 | 29 | 8 | 4080 | 197 | 6 | 2.81 | — | 4 | 1 | 3 | — | 245 | 14 | 0 | 3.43 | — |
| 1955–56 | Victoria Cougars | WHL | 69 | 35 | 29 | 5 | 4216 | 191 | 8 | 2.72 | — | 9 | 5 | 4 | — | 547 | 28 | 1 | 3.07 | — |
| 1956–57 | Victoria Cougars | WHL | 69 | 29 | 33 | 7 | 4240 | 198 | 4 | 2.80 | — | 3 | 1 | 2 | — | 199 | 6 | 0 | 1.81 | — |
| 1956–57 | Seattle Americans | WHL | 1 | 1 | 0 | 0 | 60 | 2 | 0 | 2.00 | — | — | — | — | — | — | — | — | — | — |
| 1956–57 | New Westminster Royals | WHL | — | — | — | — | — | — | — | — | — | 2 | 0 | 2 | — | 119 | 7 | 0 | 3.53 | — |
| 1957–58 | Vancouver Canucks | WHL | 70 | 44 | 21 | 5 | 4250 | 173 | 8 | 2.44 | — | 11 | 8 | 3 | — | 738 | 31 | 0 | 2.52 | — |
| 1958–59 | Victoria Cougars | WHL | 69 | 30 | 35 | 4 | 4180 | 247 | 5 | 3.55 | — | 3 | 0 | 3 | — | 180 | 12 | 0 | 4.00 | — |
| 1959–60 | Victoria Cougars | WHL | 70 | 37 | 29 | 4 | 4240 | 190 | 2 | 2.69 | — | 11 | 6 | 5 | — | 671 | 27 | 2 | 2.41 | — |
| 1960–61 | Victoria Cougars | WHL | 70 | 27 | 41 | 2 | 4220 | 263 | 1 | 3.74 | — | 5 | 2 | 3 | — | 335 | 12 | 0 | 2.15 | — |
| 1961–62 | Los Angeles Blades | WHL | 67 | 24 | 37 | 6 | 4080 | 281 | 6 | 4.13 | — | — | — | — | — | — | — | — | — | — |
| 1962–63 | New York Rangers | NHL | 2 | 0 | 1 | 0 | 39 | 3 | 0 | 4.62 | .900 | — | — | — | — | — | — | — | — | — |
| 1962–63 | Baltimore Clippers | AHL | 30 | 16 | 10 | 4 | 1800 | 91 | 1 | 3.03 | — | 3 | 1 | 2 | — | 180 | 12 | 0 | 4.00 | — |
| 1963–64 | St. Paul Rangers | CHL | 61 | 34 | 23 | 3 | 3660 | 181 | 9 | 2.97 | — | 11 | 5 | 6 | — | 661 | 48 | 0 | 4.36 | — |
| 1964–65 | Baltimore Clippers | AHL | 11 | 5 | 5 | 1 | 639 | 37 | 1 | 3.47 | — | — | — | — | — | — | — | — | — | — |
| 1964–65 | St. Paul Rangers | CHL | 32 | 19 | 7 | 5 | 1863 | 89 | 0 | 2.87 | — | 11 | 8 | 3 | — | 660 | 27 | 0 | 2.45 | — |
| 1965–66 | Los Angeles Blades | WHL | 48 | 15 | 31 | 2 | 2900 | 199 | 0 | 4.12 | — | — | — | — | — | — | — | — | — | — |
| 1965–66 | San Francisco Seals | WHL | — | — | — | — | — | — | — | — | — | 3 | 2 | 1 | — | 182 | 7 | 0 | 2.31 | — |
| 1966–67 | Jersey Devils | EHL | 23 | — | — | — | 1380 | 63 | 1 | 2.74 | — | 7 | — | — | — | 420 | 14 | 1 | 2.00 | — |
| 1967–68 | Rimouski Kades | QSHL | 43 | — | — | — | 2580 | 143 | 6 | 3.37 | — | — | — | — | — | — | — | — | — | — |
| 1968–69 | Jersey Devils | EHL | 1 | 1 | 0 | 0 | 60 | 1 | 0 | 1.00 | — | — | — | — | — | — | — | — | — | — |
| WHL totals | | | 671 | 297 | 324 | 50 | 40,546 | 2177 | 36 | 3.22 | — | 51 | 25 | 26 | — | 3216 | 144 | 3 | 2.69 | — |
| NHL totals | | | 8 | 1 | 6 | 0 | 395 | 31 | 0 | 4.72 | — | — | — | — | — | — | — | — | — | — |
