= Caroline Chiu =

Hong Kong Olympic swimmer

Personal information
- Full name: Caroline Chiu Sin-wing
- National team: Hong Kong
- Born: 29 April 1984 (age 42) Hong Kong, Hong Kong
- Height: 1.53 m (5 ft 0 in)
- Weight: 40 kg (88 lb)

Sport
- Sport: Swimming
- Strokes: Breaststroke

Caroline Chiu Sin-wing (also Chiu Sin-wing, Chinese: 趙善穎; pinyin: Zhào Shànyǐng; Jyutping: ziu^{6} sin^{6}wing^{6}; born April 29, 1984) is a Hong Kong former swimmer, who specialized in breaststroke events. She represented the new Hong Kong, China, as a 16-year-old, at the 2000 Summer Olympics, and was also a member of the territory's squad at the 2002 Asian Games.

Chiu competed only in the women's 100 m breaststroke at the 2000 Summer Olympics in Sydney. She achieved a FINA B-cut of 1:13.71 from the Asian Championships in Busan, South Korea. She challenged seven other swimmers in heat two, including Bolivia's 26-year-old Katerine Moreno and Angola's Nádia Cruz, who competed in her fourth Olympic Games at age 25. She raced to the fifth seed in a time of 1:15.87, just 2.16 seconds below her national record and an entry standard. Chiu failed to advance into the semifinals, as she placed thirty-sixth overall in the prelims.
