= Red Mitchell (ice hockey) =

Canadian professional ice hockey player

- Born: September 6, 1912; Toronto, Ontario, Canada
- Died: December 12, 1984 (aged 72)
- Height: 5 ft 10 in (178 cm)
- Weight: 190 lb (86 kg; 13 st 8 lb)
- Position: Defence
- Shot: Right
- Played for: Chicago Black Hawks
- Playing career: 1932–1948

William Lawson "Bill, Red" Mitchell (September 6, 1912 – December 12, 1984) was a Canadian ice hockey player who played 83 games in the National Hockey League with the Chicago Black Hawks from 1941 to 1945. The rest of his career, which lasted from 1932 to 1948, was spent in various minor leagues.

== Career statistics ==
=== Regular season and playoffs ===
			Regular season					Playoffs
Season	Team	League	GP	G	A	Pts	PIM	GP	G	A	Pts	PIM
1930–31	Toronto Marlboros	OHA	2	0	0	0	2	1	0	0	0	0
1931–32	Toronto Marlboros	OHA	8	1	1	2	6	4	0	0	0	6
1932–33	Kitchener Greenshirts	OHA Sr	10	3	1	4	34	—	—	—	—	—
1932–33	Detroit Olympics	IHL	19	0	0	0	54	—	—	—	—	—
1933–34	Detroit Olympics	IHL	43	2	2	4	26	6	1	1	2	0
1934–35	New Haven Eagles	Can-Am	46	1	4	5	75	—	—	—	—	—
1935–36	New Haven Eagles	Can-Am	37	2	4	6	49	—	—	—	—	—
1936–37	New Haven Eagles	IAHL	3	0	0	0	0	—	—	—	—	—
1936–37	Minneapolis Millers	AHA	34	1	7	8	54	6	1	1	2	10
1937–38	Minneapolis Millers	AHA	46	3	9	12	70	7	0	1	1	8
1938–39	Minneapolis Millers	AHA	47	9	21	30	87	4	0	2	2	0
1939–40	Minneapolis Millers	AHA	48	6	9	15	68	3	0	0	0	4
1940–41	Kansas City Americans	AHA	47	3	2	5	50	8	0	1	1	0
1941–42	Chicago Black Hawks	NHL	1	0	0	0	4	—	—	—	—	—
1941–42	Kansas City Americans	AHA	50	1	14	15	75	6	1	2	3	12
1942–43	Chicago Black Hawks	NHL	42	1	1	2	47	—	—	—	—	—
1943–44	Toronto Tip Tops	TIHL	8	1	4	5	8	—	—	—	—	—
1943–44	Toronto People's Credit	TIHL	20	1	7	8	11	10	2	1	3	18
1944–45	Chicago Black Hawks	NHL	40	3	4	7	16	—	—	—	—	—
1945–46	Kansas City Pla-Mors	USHL	49	2	27	29	47	12	0	4	4	6
1946–47	Kansas City Pla-Mors	USHL	60	8	31	39	72	12	1	6	7	6
1947–48	Providence Reds	AHL	10	1	1	2	6	—	—	—	—	—
1947–48	Kansas City Pla-Mors	USHL	54	6	12	18	47	7	1	1	2	5
AHA totals			272	23	62	85	404	34	2	7	9	34
NHL totals			83	4	5	9	67	—	—	—	—	—
