= The Alaskan Ice Palace =

Indoor, artificial ice rink

- Wible Ice Skating Rink
- Interactive map of The Alaskan Ice Palace
- Location: 888 S Hydraulic Ave. Wichita, Kansas, 67211
- Coordinates: 37°40′30″N 97°19′01″W
- Owner: Wible Ice and Cold Storage company
- Capacity: 4,500
- Surface: 175' x 50'

Construction
- Opened: 1933
- Closed: 1954

Tenants
- Wichita Vikings (1933); Wichita Skyhawks (1935–1940)

The Alaskan Ice Palace in Wichita, Kansas was an indoor, artificial ice rink. The billed itself as the only know ice hockey rink in Kansas and was home to the first two professional teams in the state.

== History ==
Samuel Noble Wible, owner of the Wible Ice and Cold Storage company, was granted a permit to build an ice hockey rink on his industrial park in January 1932. By year's end, the region's first artificial ice hockey rink opened. The Wible rink was smaller than a standard rink of the day, with most surfaces being 200' by 90' or thereabouts. The fist game was held between a group of local players and the Tulsa Rangers. When over 2,000 people showed up for the inaugural match, Wible decided to invest further in the rink and soon had additional bleachers erected to accommodate overflow. Despite the small size of the rink, the fanfare helped to entice the cash-strapped Duluth Hornets to relocate and become the Wichita Blue Jays for the second half of the 1933 season. Unfortunately, the team was unable to sort out all of its problems before the following season and the club folded just 3 games into the year.

The following summer, Wible spent an additional $20,000 ($475,000 in 2024) to refurbish the new building and model it after the Tulsa Coliseum. Seating was increased to about 4,500 and the entire rink was now enclosed. With the new facilities in place, Ella Wible, Samuel's wife, was awarded an expansion franchise in 1935 and the Wichita Skyhawks began playing in November of that year. The team wasn't very successful on the ice, producing only one winning campaign in five years, and saw its initially strong crowd diminish by the end of the decade. In 1940, the team was sued for lack of payment by its players and disbanded after the season.

During the Skyhawks' final campaign, the Wibles knew that they would have to change their plans if they were to recoup their investment in the building. They began to search for additional events to hold at the Ice Palace and began hosting the Barn Dance Frolic in August 1939. The venue hosted a multitude of events afterwards, including roller skating, midget car racing, stage shows, and were able to get KFH (AM) to broadcast the musically inclined events. The ice palace proved to be inadequate for most of these venues as it was never designed for such a purpose. Aside from being too small for some pursuits, the building was not designed with acoustics in mind and the music acts were poorly reviewed. After World War II, it reverted into being solely a skating rink and hosted mostly amateur or semi-professional matches until the mid-50s. While no official date was given, the last recorded game occurred on February 14, 1954.
