= Petelski =

Petelski is a surname. Notable people with the surname include:

- Czesław Petelski (1922–1996), Polish film director
- Christin Petelski (born 1977), Canadian swimmer
