= Ralph Wycherley =

Canadian ice hockey player

- Born: February 26, 1920 Saskatoon, Saskatchewan, Canada
- Died: March 4, 2007 (aged 87) Oakville, Ontario, Canada
- Height: 6 ft 0 in (183 cm)
- Weight: 174 lb (79 kg; 12 st 6 lb)
- Position: Left Wing
- Shot: Left
- Played for: Brooklyn Americans; New York Americans
- Playing career: 1940–1950

Ralph "Bus" Wycherley (February 26, 1920 — March 4, 2007) was a Canadian ice hockey player who played 28 games in the National Hockey League for the New York Americans/Brooklyn Americans between 1940 and 1942. The rest of his career, which lasted from 1940 to 1950, was spent in various minor leagues. Wycherley was born in Saskatoon, Saskatchewan and played junior hockey for the Brandon Elks.

== Career statistics ==
=== Regular season and playoffs ===
			Regular season					Playoffs
Season	Team	League	GP	G	A	Pts	PIM	GP	G	A	Pts	PIM
1937–38	Saskatoon Wesleys	SAHA	2	0	1	1	5	—	—	—	—	—
1938–39	Brandon Elks	MJHL	15	25	11	36	15	7	7	2	9	6
1938–39	Brandon Elks	M-Cup	—	—	—	—	—	6	7	3	10	4
1939–40	Brandon Elks	MJHL	24	24	12	36	14	3	0	1	1	2
1940–41	New York Americans	NHL	26	4	5	9	4	—	—	—	—	—
1940–41	Springfield Indians	AHL	13	5	4	9	7	—	—	—	—	—
1941–42	Brooklyn Americans	NHL	2	0	2	2	2	—	—	—	—	—
1941–42	Springfield Indians	AHL	12	3	5	8	6	—	—	—	—	—
1941–42	Philadelphia Ramblers	AHL	21	10	8	18	6	—	—	—	—	—
1941–42	Hershey Bears	AHL	5	1	4	5	0	3	0	1	1	0
1942–43	Toronto RCAF	OHA Sr	7	4	2	6	2	9	12	7	19	10
1942–43	Toronto RCAF	Al-Cup	—	—	—	—	—	4	5	5	10	4
1943–44	Toronto RCAF	OHA Sr	6	6	1	7	2	—	—	—	—	—
1943–44	Toronto Fuels	TMHL	8	13	7	20	7	6	8	8	16	4
1944–45	Toronto RCAF	TNDHL	2	2	2	4	0	—	—	—	—	—
1944–45	Toronto Orphans	TMHL	8	16	10	26	4	—	—	—	—	—
1946–47	Hershey Bears	AHL	4	0	0	0	0	—	—	—	—	—
1946–47	Tulsa Oilers	USHL	51	32	22	54	6	5	2	1	3	0
1947–48	Minneapolis Millers	USHL	61	40	38	78	4	10	3	7	10	0
1948–49	Cleveland Barons	AHL	39	16	18	34	8	4	0	0	0	0
1949–50	Kansas City Pla-Mors	USHL	63	30	32	62	5	3	0	0	0	0
1950–51	Toronto Marlboros	OMHL	30	14	18	32	8	3	1	0	1	2
AHL totals			94	35	39	74	27	7	0	1	1	0
NHL totals			28	4	7	11	6	—	—	—	—	—
