= 1947–48 WIHL season =

North American ice hockey tournament

1947–48 was the second season of the Western International Hockey League.

== Standings ==
1. Kimberley Dynamiters 27-8-0 .771 187-108
2. Trail Smoke Eaters 19-17-1 .528 155-153
3. Spokane Spartans 24-31-1 .436 214-252
4. Nelson Maple Leafs 12-26-0 .316 112-155

Note: Spokane Spartans were not eligible for the Allan Cup.

== Semi final ==
Best of 5

- Trail 4 Nelson 0
- Trail 5 Nelson 2
- Trail 5 Nelson 1

Trail Smoke Eaters beat Nelson Maple Leafs 3 wins to none.

== Final ==
Best of 5

- Trail 5 Kimberley 4
- Kimberley 4 Trail 1
- Trail 3 Kimberley 2
- Kimberley 4 Trail 3
- Kimberley 6 Trail 6
- Trail 5 Kimberley 3

Trail Smoke Eaters beat Kimberley Dynamiters 3 wins to 2, 1 tie.

Since this was the only senior league in the province, the Trail Smoke Eaters advanced to the 1947-48 Western Canada Allan Cup Playoffs.
