= Eric Bishop =

Canadian sports journalist (1926–2000)

- Born: January 30, 1926; Lacombe, Alberta
- Died: April 1, 2000 (aged 74); Calgary, Alberta
- Occupation: Sports journalist

Eric Stewart Bishop (30 January 1926 – 1 April 2000) was a Canadian sports journalist and play-by-play sports broadcaster. In 1987, Bishop was inducted into the Canadian Football Hall of Fame as a broadcaster.

Bishop was also briefly a horse race owner.

== Work experience ==
- Junior sportswriter Vancouver Sun, c. 1944
- Royal Canadian Air Force, 1944
- catcher Purity 99 Big Four League baseball Calgary, mid 1940s
- sportswriter/assistant sports editor Calgary Herald, 1946
- PR/broadcaster WIHL Los Angeles Ramblers 1946–47
- Sports Director CJAT Trail, British Columbia, 1948
- Home Oil Pro Hockey broadcasts CKNW New Westminster, 1952
- Sports Director CFAC Calgary, 1954
- called horse races Victoria Park Calgary, 1959–64
- Sports Editor Calgary Albertan, early 1960s
- CKXL (AM) Calgary, late 1960s
- part owner WHL Victoria Cougars, 1970s
- BC Lions football play-by-play announcer with CKWX, 1970s
- play-by-play WHA Calgary Cowboys CFAC Calgary, 1980s
- sports columnist Calgary Sun, 1990s
