= Corrie Clark =

American swimmer (born 1982)

Personal information
- National team: United States
- Born: April 11, 1982 (age 44) Malvern, Pennsylvania

Sport
- Sport: Swimming
- Strokes: Breaststroke, medley
- College team: Southern Methdoist University
Medal record
Women's swimming
Representing the United States
Pan American Games
Silver medal – second place	2003 Santo Domingo	100 m breaststroke
Silver medal – second place	2003 Santo Domingo	200 m medley

Corrie Clark (born April 11, 1982) is a female breaststroke and medley swimmer from the United States. At the 2003 Pan American Games, she won silver medals in the 100 breaststroke and 200 IM, although at one point PASO stripped Clark of the breaststroke medal.

Clark studied at and swam for Southern Methodist University (2000–2003).

In 2008, Clark was hired to fill an Associate Coach position at Swarthmore College under the guidance of veteran coach Susan P. Davis. After a brief stint, Corrie Clark chose to end a 2-year contract early. Corrie began running the swimmer development program at acac Fitness and Wellness Centre [sic] in West Chester, PA. She is currently training full-time at Penn State.
