= Jim Bedard (ice hockey, born 1927) =

Canadian ice hockey player (1927–1994)

- Born: November 19, 1927 Admiral, Saskatchewan, Canada
- Died: February 2, 1994 (aged 66) Port Moody, British Columbia, Canada
- Height: 6 ft 0 in (183 cm)
- Weight: 175 lb (79 kg; 12 st 7 lb)
- Position: Defence
- Shot: Left
- Played for: Chicago Black Hawks
- Playing career: 1948–1958

James Leo Bedard (November 19, 1927 – February 2, 1994) was a Canadian professional ice hockey defenceman who played 22 games in the National Hockey League with the Chicago Black Hawks during the 1949–50 and 1950–51 seasons. He spent the majority of his career, which lasted from 1948 to 1958, with the New Westminster Royals of the Western Hockey League. He is the great-great uncle of Connor Bedard.

== Career statistics ==
=== Regular season and playoffs ===
			Regular season					Playoffs
Season	Team	League	GP	G	A	Pts	PIM	GP	G	A	Pts	PIM
1945–46	Moose Jaw Canucks	S-SJHL	10	0	3	3	20	4	0	1	1	8
1945–46	Moose Jaw Canucks	M-Cup	—	—	—	—	—	8	2	2	4	15
1946–47	Moose Jaw Canucks	SJHL	26	11	5	16	82	6	0	1	1	18
1946–47	Moose Jaw Canucks	M-Cup	—	—	—	—	—	6	0	1	1	50
1947–48	Moose Jaw Canucks	SJHL	25	12	5	17	60	5	0	0	0	19
1947–48	Moose Jaw Canucks	M-Cup	—	—	—	—	—	4	1	1	2	10
1948–49	Kansas City Pla-Mors	USHL	63	5	6	11	2	1	1	2	3	0
1949–50	Chicago Black Hawks	NHL	5	0	0	0	2	—	—	—	—	—
1949–50	Kansas City Pla-Mors	USHL	56	3	15	18	43	3	0	0	0	4
1950–51	Chicago Black Hawks	NHL	17	1	1	2	6	—	—	—	—	—
1950–51	Milwaukee Sea Gulls	USHL	50	4	16	20	59	—	—	—	—	—
1951–52	New Westminster Royals	PCHL	66	4	12	16	104	7	1	1	2	14
1952–53	New Westminster Royals	WHL	70	4	15	19	116	—	—	—	—	—
1953–54	New Westminster Royals	WHL	58	1	12	13	77	7	0	2	2	19
1954–55	New Westminster Royals	WHL	60	1	7	8	70	—	—	—	—	—
1955–56	Seattle Americans	WHL	15	1	0	1	29	—	—	—	—	—
1955–56	Penticton Vees	OSHL	40	2	13	15	96	7	1	1	2	20
1956–57	Vancouver Canucks	WHL	16	1	1	2	23	—	—	—	—	—
1956–57	Kelowna Packers	OSHL	27	1	6	7	18	7	0	2	2	4
1957–58	New Westminster Royals	WHL	12	0	2	2	4	—	—	—	—	—
WHL totals			231	8	37	45	319	7	0	2	2	19
NHL totals			22	1	1	2	8	—	—	—	—	—
