= George Johnston (ice hockey) =

Canadian ice hockey player

- Born: July 30, 1920 St. Charles, Manitoba, Canada
- Died: April 20, 2006 (aged 85) Spokane, Washington, U.S.
- Height: 5 ft 8 in (173 cm)
- Weight: 160 lb (73 kg; 11 st 6 lb)
- Position: Right wing
- Shot: Right
- Played for: Chicago Black Hawks
- Playing career: 1938–1955

George Joseph "Wingy" Johnston (July 30, 1920 – April 20, 2006) was a Canadian ice hockey right winger who played four seasons in the National Hockey League for the Chicago Black Hawks from 1942 to 1946.

== Early life ==
Johnston was born in the St. Charles parish of Winnipeg, Manitoba. He played minor league hockey with the Saskatoon Quakers.

== Career ==
Johnston began his professional career with the Providence Reds of the American Hockey League in 1940. He was a member of the Kansas City Americans before joining the Chicago Blackhawks at the start of the 1941 season. Johnston played for the Kansas City Pla-Mors before rejoining the Blackhawks in 1945. After leaving the NHL, he was a member of the New Haven Ramblers, Tacoma Rockets, and Spokane Flyers.

== Career statistics ==
=== Regular season and playoffs ===
			Regular season					Playoffs
Season	Team	League	GP	G	A	Pts	PIM	GP	G	A	Pts	PIM
1938–39	Duluth Zephyrs	TBSHL	11	5	2	7	14	—	—	—	—	—
1938–39	Duluth Zephyrs	IASHL	26	14	9	23	14	—	—	—	—	—
1939–40	Saskatoon Quakers	SSHL	28	11	12	23	2	4	0	1	1	0
1940–41	Providence Reds	AHL	50	17	24	41	4	4	2	2	4	0
1941–42	Chicago Black Hawks	NHL	2	2	0	2	0	—	—	—	—	—
1941–42	Kansas City Americans	AHA	31	18	14	32	6	6	3	9	12	0
1942–43	Chicago Black Hawks	NHL	30	10	7	17	0	—	—	—	—	—
1943–44	Vancouver RCAF	PCHL	10	12	5	17	2	—	—	—	—	—
1944–45	Saint John Beavers	Exhib	—	—	—	—	—	—	—	—	—	—
1944–45	Vancouver RCAF	Exhib	3	4	2	6	0	—	—	—	—	—
1945–46	Chicago Black Hawks	NHL	16	5	4	9	2	—	—	—	—	—
1945–46	Kansas City Pla-Mors	USHL	38	38	34	72	6	12	4	8	12	2
1946–47	Chicago Black Hawks	NHL	10	3	1	4	0	—	—	—	—	—
1946–47	Kansas City Pla-Mors	USHL	47	29	29	58	6	12	5	4	9	4
1947–48	Cleveland Barons	AHL	15	4	4	8	4	—	—	—	—	—
1947–48	New Haven Ramblers	AHL	39	16	24	40	10	4	1	1	2	0
1948–49	New Haven Ramblers	AHL	39	14	23	37	2	—	—	—	—	—
1948–49	Tacoma Rockets	PCHL	28	17	14	31	4	6	0	5	5	0
1949–50	Tacoma Rockets	PCHL	70	46	44	90	64	5	0	2	2	0
1950–51	Tacoma Rockets	PCHL	70	27	31	58	17	6	1	2	3	0
1951–52	Tacoma Rockets	PCHL	70	32	45	77	8	7	2	4	6	0
1952–53	Tacoma Rockets	WHL	70	24	41	65	8	—	—	—	—	—
1953–54	Spokane Flyers	WIHL	66	35	39	74	45	5	2	4	6	0
1954–55	Spokane Flyers	WIHL	35	15	24	39	16	—	—	—	—	—
PCHL totals			248	134	139	273	95	24	3	13	16	0
NHL totals			58	20	12	32	2	—	—	—	—	—
