= Jerome Burg =

American radio personality (1935–2004)

Jerome S. Burg
- Born: August 2, 1935; New York, New York, U.S.
- Died: May 13, 2004 (aged 68); Scottsdale, Arizona, U.S.
- Occupations: Financial Advisor, Radio Personality
- Spouse: Vanessa Browndorf (1958 - 1972) Janis Elaine Burg
- Children: Harriet Bonner, Audree Burg, Robert Burg, Stephanie Rykaczewski, Jeffrey Burg and David Burg
- Parent(s): Norman Burg and Ruth (Schkurman) Burg

Jerome (Jerry) Stuart Burg (August 2, 1935 – May 13, 2004) was a financial advisor and radio personality in the Arizona area, but was nationally known, appearing on network news programs such as 60 Minutes and being quoted in national publications, including USA Today and The Wall Street Journal.

Burg attended the New York Military Academy and Temple University, after which he worked in the insurance industry, residing in Cherry Hill, New Jersey. During that time he became the President of the Jersey Devils of the Eastern Hockey League. He moved to Scottsdale, Arizona in 1979, pursuing a financial planning practice. While working for the Acacia Group, he was a radio talk show host for more than ten years with shows on KFYI and KFNN, most notably KFNN's drive-time program, Money Talks.

Burg had a rare condition known as multiple system atrophy for seven years before his death.
