= Rhiannon Leier =

Canadian swimmer

Personal information
- Full name: Rhiannon Leier
- National team: Canada
- Born: May 30, 1977 (age 49) Regina, Saskatchewan
- Height: 1.76 m (5 ft 9 in)
- Weight: 65 kg (143 lb)

Sport
- Sport: Swimming
- Strokes: Breaststroke
- Club: Manitoba Marlins
- College team: University of Miami
Medal record
Women's swimming
Representing Canada
Pan Pacific Championships
Bronze medal – third place	2002 Yokohama	4×100 m medley

Rhiannon Leier (born May 30, 1977) is a Canadian former competition swimmer who specialized in breaststroke events. She is a multiple-time Canadian record holder, a two-time finalist at the FINA World Championships (2001 and 2003), and a six-time NCAA All-American honoree. She also won a bronze medal, as a member of the Canadian swimming team, in the women's 4x100-metre medley relay at the 2002 Pan Pacific Swimming Championships in Yokohama, Japan, clocking at 4:05.59. Leier is also the granddaughter of former baseball player, track athlete, and ice hockey player Edward Leier, who played two seasons with the Chicago Blackhawks in the National Hockey League.

Leier made her first Canadian team at the 2000 Summer Olympics in Sydney, where she competed in the women's 100-metre breaststroke, along with her teammate Christin Petelski. Leier, however, failed to qualify for the final, as she finished her semifinal run in eleventh place, with a time of 1:09.63.

Four years later, Leier qualified for her second Canadian team, as a 27-year-old, at the 2004 Summer Olympics in Athens, by breaking a Canadian record and attaining an A-standard time of 1:08.14 from the Olympic trials. She finished twelfth overall in the semifinals of the women's 100 m breaststroke by a hundredth of a second (0.01) behind her teammate Lauren van Oosten, outside the Canadian record time of 1:09.46.

Leier is also a member of the swimming team for Manitoba Marlins, and a former varsity swimmer for the Miami Hurricanes, while attending the University of Miami in Coral Gables, Florida, where she took up a major in pre-physical therapy. She worked as a resident swimming coach for the St. James Seals in Winnipeg, Manitoba until this past summer.

Leier was inducted into the Manitoba Sports Hall of Fame in 2016.
