= Kansas City Pla-Mors =

- City: Kansas City, Missouri
- League: American Hockey Association; United States Hockey League
- Operated: 1926–1942 (AHA); 1945–1950 (USHL)
- Home arena: Pla-Mor Arena
- Colors: blue, red

Franchise history
- 1926–1927: Chicago Cardinals / Americans
- 1927–1933: Kansas City Pla-Mors
- 1933–1940: Kansas City Greyhounds
- 1940–1942: Kansas City Americans
- 1945–1949: Kansas City Pla-Mors
- 1949–1950: Kansas City Mohawks

Championships
- Playoff championships: 1930, 1933, 1934, 1946, 1947

The Kansas City Pla-Mors were a professional ice hockey team. Based in Kansas City, Missouri, they operated within the American Hockey Association (AHA) under various names from 1927 to 1942 and then under the United States Hockey League from 1945 to 1949 as the Kansas City Pla-Mors.

== History ==
The franchise was founded by Eddie Livingstone as the Chicago Cardinals in 1926. After a fight over finances and ownership, Livingstone was forcibly removed as team owner and the team was transferred to Kansas City.

In their new home, the team performed well. After two (barely) winning seasons in the first two years, the Pla-Mors (taken from the name of their home rink) won both the regular season and league championship in 1930. Several successful seasons followed and after their second championship in 1933, the team's name was changed to 'Greyhounds'. A third title followed after the change but, after the departure of the head coach Bill Grant, the Greyhounds began to flag. 1935 saw the team post its first losing season in Kansas City, a trend that would continue for the rest of the decade. It wasn't until Johnny Gottselig took over as player/coach mid-way through the 40–41 season that the team recovered. Gottselig led the renamed 'Americans' to consecutive appearance in the league final but the team was unable to continue that run as World War II forced the league to cease operating for several years.

After the war, the United States Hockey League was created from the remnants of the AHA and the Kansas City franchise was restarted. The team took its original name of 'Pla-Mors' and won the first two championships in league history. In 1949, the team changed monikers once more and became the 'Mohawks'. The team played just one season under the new name before folding. Afterwards, a different franchise came to Kansas City under the 'Cowboys' moniker but a year later the entire league ceased operations, ending professional hockey in Kansas City for the remainder of the decade.

== Season-by-season results ==
=== AHA ===
Season	GP	W	L	T	Pts	Finish	Coach(es)	Postseason
1927–28	40	18	14	8	44	2nd	Bill Grant	Lost in Semifinal
1928–29	40	17	16	7	41	4th	Bill Grant	missed
1929–30	48	21	13	14	56	1st	Bill Grant	Won Championship
1930–31	48	28	16	4	56	T–2nd	Bill Grant	Lost in Finals
1931–32	48	28	18	2	56	2nd	Bill Grant	Lost in Semifinal
1932–33	46	25	20	1	51	1st	Bill Grant	Won Championship
1933–34	48	26	18	4	52	T–1st	Mike Goodman	Won Championship
1934–35	48	23	25	0	46	T–2nd	Mike Goodman	Lost in Semifinal
1935–36	48	20	26	2	40	5th	Pudge MacKenzie	missed
1936–37	48	21	23	4	42	T–3rd	Pudge MacKenzie	Lost in Semifinal
1937–38	48	21	22	5	42	5th	Helge Bostrom	missed
1938–39	55	15	33	7	30	5th	Helge Bostrom	missed
1939–40	48	20	28	0	40	5th	Melville Keeling	missed
1940–41	48	25	23	0	50	T–2nd	Bill Hudson / Johnny Gottselig	Lost in Final
1941–42	50	31	17	2	64	1st in South	Johnny Gottselig	Lost in Final
Total	711	339	312	60	.519			3 Championships

=== USHL ===
Season	GP	W	L	T	Pts	Finish	Coach(es)	Postseason
1945–46	56	35	17	4	74	1st	Elwin Romnes	Won Championship
1946–47	60	29	20	11	69	2nd in Northern	Elwin Romnes / Reg Hamilton	Won Championship
1947–48	66	35	27	4	74	T–1st in Northern	Reg Hamilton	Lost in Quarterfinal
1948–49	66	30	23	13	73	2nd in Northern	Reg Hamilton	Lost in Quarterfinal
1949–50	70	30	28	12	72	3rd	Hank Blade	Lost in Semifinal
Total	318	159	115	44	.569			2 Championships

== Notable players ==
- Rudy Ahlin
- Art Alexandre
- Frank Ashworth
- Doug Baldwin
- George Beach
- Jim Bedard
- Andy Bellemer
- Max Bentley
- Reg Bentley
- Hank Blade
- Helge Bostrom
- Claude Bourque
- Milton Brink
- Adam Brown
- Roy Burmister
- Eddie Bush
- Dick Butler
- Bob Carse
- Abbie Cox
- Jimmy Creighton
- Bob DeCourcy
- Victor Desjardins
- Harry Dick
- L. S. Dukowski
- Henry Dyck
- Gord Fashoway
- Wilf Field
- Tom Fowler
- Emile Francis
- Jimmy Franks
- Bill Gadsby
- Paul Gauthier
- George Gee
- Sammy Godin
- Fred Gordon
- Johnny Gottselig
- Haldor Halderson
- Reg Hamilton
- Emil Hanson
- Johnny Harms
- Fern Headley
- Jim Henry
- Fred Hergert
- Frank Ingram
- Doug Jackson
- Jack Jackson
- Lloyd Jackson
- George Johnston
- Butch Keeling
- Leo Lafrance
- Bun LaPrairie
- Edward Leier
- Pete Leswick
- Bill Long
- Sam LoPresti
- Pudge MacKenzie
- Joe Matte
- Joe McCormick
- Johnny McKinnon
- Sammy McManus
- Jack Miller
- Red Mitchell
- Bill Mosienko
- Andy Mulligan
- Gerald Munro
- Ralph Nattrass
- Hickey Nicholson
- Bert Olmstead
- Joe Papike
- Marcel Pelletier
- Ray Powell
- Fido Purpur
- Yip Radley
- Gordon Reid
- Leo Reise
- Harvey Rockburn
- Al Rollins
- Charles Shannon
- Pat Shea
- Vic Stasiuk
- Frank Steele
- Norbert Sterle
- Doug Stevenson
- Ken Stewart
- Ralph Taylor
- Jack Tomson
- Norman Tustin
- Aud Tuten
- Eddie Wares
- Nick Wasnie
- Art Wiebe
- Ralph Wycherley

bold in the Hockey Hall of Fame
