= Hassie Young =

Canadian ice hockey player (1924–2020)

- Born: March 23, 1924 Edmonton, Alberta, Canada
- Died: March 23, 2020 (aged 96) Vancouver, British Columbia, Canada
- Height: 6 ft 2 in (188 cm)
- Weight: 180 lb (82 kg; 12 st 12 lb)
- Position: Center
- Played for: Edmonton Mercurys
- National team: Canada
- Playing career: 1941–1952
Medal record
Men's ice hockey
Gold medal – first place	1950 London	Ice hockey

Harrison Stephens "Hassie" Young (March 23, 1924 – March 23, 2020) was a Canadian ice hockey player with the Edmonton Mercurys. He won a gold medal at the 1950 World Ice Hockey Championships in London, England. The 1950 Edmonton Mercurys team was inducted to the Alberta Sports Hall of Fame in 2011. He also played with the UBC Thunderbirds and Los Angeles Ramblers. Young died on his 96th birthday in 2020.
