= 1953 Allan Cup =

Canadian senior ice hockey championship

The Allan Cup was the championship trophy for senior hockey overseen by the CAHA.

The 1953 Allan Cup was the senior ice hockey championship of the Canadian Amateur Hockey Association (CAHA) for the 1952–53 season. The event was hosted by the Kitchener-Waterloo Flying Dutchmen and Kitchener, Ontario. The 1953 playoff marked the 45th time that the Allan Cup has been awarded.

CAHA vice-president Jimmy Dunn was chairman of the senior playoffs in 1953, and was faced with multiple branches of the CAHA not participating. He wanted to include as many teams as possible since the CAHA and all of its branches were primarily funded by gate receipts from the playoffs and could not afford the loss of income. The CAHA had suspended the Quebec Amateur Hockey Association for the season due to registration violations, and the Alberta Amateur Hockey Association chose to withdraw from senior hockey. Dunn went to extraordinary efforts to retain the Saskatchewan Amateur Hockey Association teams, which included rescheduling multiple series due to delays in the Saskatchewan playoffs and demands to play against the Manitoba Amateur Hockey Association champion rather than the British Columbia Amateur Hockey Association champion.

== Teams ==
- Kitchener-Waterloo Flying Dutchmen (Eastern Canadian champions)
- Penticton Vees (Western Canadian champions)

== Playdowns ==
Allan Cup playoffs:

=== Allan Cup Best-of-Seven Series ===
Kitchener-Waterloo Flying Dutchmen 3 - Penticton Vees 2
Kitchener-Waterloo Flying Dutchmen 8 - Penticton Vees 3
Penticton Vees 2 - Kitchener-Waterloo Flying Dutchmen 1
Kitchener-Waterloo Flying Dutchmen 6 - Penticton Vees 3
Kitchener-Waterloo Flying Dutchmen 5 - Penticton Vees 0

=== Eastern Playdowns ===
Semi-final

Smiths Falls Rideaus defeated St. John Beavers 4-games-to-none

Smiths Falls Rideaus 4 - St. John Beavers 1
Smiths Falls Rideaus 6 - St. John Beavers 2
Smiths Falls Rideaus 9 - St. John Beavers 3
Smiths Falls Rideaus 5 - St. John Beavers 2

Kitchener-Waterloo Flying Dutchmen defeated Sudbury Wolves 4-games-to-2 with 1 tie

Kitchener-Waterloo Flying Dutchmen 4 - Sudbury Wolves 2
Kitchener-Waterloo Flying Dutchmen 8 - Sudbury Wolves 3
Kitchener-Waterloo Flying Dutchmen 3 - Sudbury Wolves 3
Sudbury Wolves 5 - Kitchener-Waterloo Flying Dutchmen 4
Sudbury Wolves 5 - Kitchener-Waterloo Flying Dutchmen 4
Kitchener-Waterloo Flying Dutchmen 3 - Sudbury Wolves 1
Kitchener-Waterloo Flying Dutchmen 6 - Sudbury Wolves 4

Final

Kitchener-Waterloo Flying Dutchmen defeated Smiths Falls Rideaus 4-games-to-3

Smiths Falls Rideaus 6 - Kitchener-Waterloo Flying Dutchmen 2
Smiths Falls Rideaus 2 - Kitchener-Waterloo Flying Dutchmen 0
Kitchener-Waterloo Flying Dutchmen 6 - Smiths Falls Rideaus 4
Smiths Falls Rideaus 7 - Kitchener-Waterloo Flying Dutchmen 4
Kitchener-Waterloo Flying Dutchmen 9 - Smiths Falls Rideaus 1
Kitchener-Waterloo Flying Dutchmen 6 - Smiths Falls Rideaus 1
Kitchener-Waterloo Flying Dutchmen 6 - Smiths Falls Rideaus 0

=== Western Playdowns ===
Quarter-final

Regina Capitals defeated Winnipeg Maroons 4-games-to-3

Winnipeg Maroons 7 - Regina Capitals 2
Winnipeg Maroons 6 - Regina Capitals 1
Regina Capitals 5 - Winnipeg Maroons 0
Regina Capitals 6 - Winnipeg Maroons 3
Winnipeg Maroons 5 - Regina Capitals 2
Regina Capitals 5 - Winnipeg Maroons 3
Regina Capitals 4 - Winnipeg Maroons 1

Semi-final

Fort William Beavers defeated Regina Capitals 4-games-to-2

Regina Capitals 5 - Fort William Beavers 3
Regina Capitals 5 - Fort William Beavers 1
Fort William Beavers 4 - Regina Capitals 1
Fort William Beavers 4 - Regina Capitals 0
Fort William Beavers 7 - Regina Capitals 2
Fort William Beavers 5 - Regina Capitals 0

Final

Penticton Vees defeated Fort William Beavers 4-games-to-2

Penticton Vees 5 - Fort William Beavers 2
Penticton Vees 4 - Fort William Beavers 3
Fort William Beavers 5 - Penticton Vees 4
Fort William Beavers 5 - Penticton Vees 0
Penticton Vees 5 - Fort William Beavers 1
Penticton Vees 4 - Fort William Beavers 3
