= Penticton Vees (senior) =

The Penticton Vees were a senior men's ice hockey team from Penticton, British Columbia, Canada. They played in the Okanagan Senior League from to 1951 to 1961. They represented Canada in the 1955 Ice Hockey World Championships, where they won Canada's 16th world championship title.

== History ==
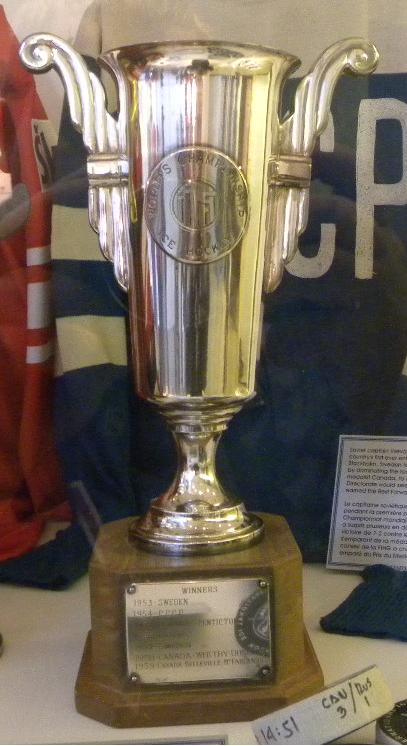
Ice Hockey World Championships trophy won by Penticton

The Penticton Vees were named for the victory, valiant, and vidette varieties of peaches grown in the Okanagan Valley.

The first game played by the senior Penticton Vees was opening of Penticton Memorial Arena on October 25, 1951, versus the Vernon Canadians. The Vees played in the Okanagan Senior Hockey League, and in 1953, were crowned Champions of Western Canada. They almost won the Allan Cup in their second season in 1952-53, losing the final to the Kitchener-Waterloo Dutchmen. The next season they went all the way to win the Allan Cup, beating the Sudbury Wolves in a series that went all seven games.

The Vees were chosen represent Canada at the 1955 Ice Hockey World Championships in West Germany. The Canadian Press reported that Canadian Amateur Hockey Association president W. B. George requested a network to spy on the Soviet Union national team. Intelligence reported to Penticton included accounts by Canadians who played hockey in Europe and attended the Soviet Union's games. Doug Grimston led a committee to oversee travel arrangements for the team to the World Championships. Grimston felt that the Vees were strong enough to win without the need to add extra players, and referred to them as "the fightingest team in hockey today and can do a better job of representing this country than any all-star team". After a Canadian exhibition game versus the Czechoslovakia national team, George discounted reports dispatched from Prague and printed in the Daily Worker in London as exaggerated, and denied that Penticton's style of play was "thuggery-on-ice". He also criticized media in Canada for distorting the playing conditions in Europe and felt that players on Penticton had conducted themselves appropriately. Penticton won the 1955 World Championships with a 5–0 victory over the Soviet Union national team in the decisive game. George felt that the final game was "played as hockey should be played" and hoped that European teams would copy the Canadian style of play. Despite the victory, the Canadian Press reported sentiments from Canadian players and spectators that "Canada should never again take part in the tournament under its present setup".

The Vees won another provincial championship in 1960. Six alumni from the senior Vees, also played in the National Hockey League. They are James Bedard, Edward Diachuk, Connie Madigan, George McAvoy, Bill Warwick and his brother Grant Warwick. In the 1960–61 season the team folded only a few months before the entire league collapsed.

== Season-by-season record ==
=== Okanagan Senior League ===
Season	Games	Won	Lost	Tied	Points	Goals for	Goals against	Standing	Playoffs
1951–52	52	15	35	2	32	-	-	4th	out of playoffs
1952–53	54	23	24	7	53	233	211	3rd	Won Final Won Province Lost Allan Cup
1953–54	64	42	20	2	86	268	225	1st	Won Final Won Province Won Allan Cup
1954–55	54	31	19	4	66	228	180	1st	Did not play off Won World
1955–56	56	25	30	1	51	-	-	2nd	Lost Semi Final
1956–57	54	21	30	3	45	214	289	4th	Lost Semi Final
1957–58	54	16	36	2	34	220	263	4th	Lost Semi Final
1958–59	54	16	36	2	34	189	267	4th	Lost Semi Final
1959–60	46	5	40	1	11	190	382	4th	Lost Semi Final
1960–61	21	11	10	0	-	117	105	-	Folded Dec. 1

== Notable alumni ==
- James Bedard
- Edward Diachuk
- Connie Madigan
- George McAvoy
- Ivan McLelland
- Bill Warwick
- Grant Warwick

== See also ==
- Penticton Vees
