= Los Angeles Ramblers =

Defunct American ice hockey team

The Los Angeles Ramblers were a senior men's ice hockey team that played one season (1946–47) in the Western International Hockey League.

== History ==
In 1946–47, a group of Los Angeles businessmen entered a team in the WIHL. Having to guarantee all expenses for teams from Kimberley, Nelson, Trail and Spokane, with each club making four trips and playing a doubleheader, proved too expensive to sustain, especially with Los Angeles having a team in the more popular Pacific Coast Hockey League.

To add color to the league, the Los Angeles Ramblers' executive came up with the George Montgomery-Dinah Shore Cup, a trophy donated by the film-famed pair from Hollywood. The trophy went to the league champions, with the Kimberley Dynamiters the first team to have their name carved on the cup.

Coach Kenny Stewart, a native of Lethbridge, Alberta (and a former Lethbridge Maple Leaf), was the playing-coach of the Ramblers. Vern Kneeshaw was their goalie, with Fred Holger doubling as spare netminder and general manager. Mayer Flett, Lou Labovich, Jack Lambrecht and Harvey Barnes formed the Ramblers' defence. Up front they had Joe Levine, Benny Hayes, Max Labovich, Kenny Stewart, Jack Miller, Hassie Young, Terry Cavanaugh and Jim Fleming. Eric Bishop announced the Ramblers games (on radio), both at home and away.
