= Wichita Skyhawks =

- City: Wichita, Kansas
- League: American Hockey Association
- Operated: 1935–1940
- Home arena: The Alaskan Ice Palace
- Colors: blue, red

The Wichita Skyhawks were a professional ice hockey team based in Wichita, Kansas. They operated within the American Hockey Association for just under 5 years and were forcible dissolved due to financial difficulties.

== History ==
In January 1932, Samuel Noble Wible received a permit to build an ice hockey rink adjacent to business, the Wible Ice and Cold Storage company. The Initial rink was an outdoor facility but the artificial surface enabled Wible to entice the Duluth Hornets to move to Wichita the following winter. The team lasted less than a year in the new home and dissolved just 3 games into the 1933–34 season.

A few years later, Wible's wife, Ella, decided to try her hand at owning a hockey team. She applied for a new franchise in the American Hockey Association and was approved during the summer meeting in 1935. That November, the Wichita Skyhawks debuted with Magnus "Mike" Goodman as player / head coach. The team had a poor first season but slowly resolved into a decent club by the third year. Goodman led the Skyhawks to their first playoff appearance in 1938 and the team was beginning to establish a foothold in the region.

That summer, Goodman resigned as coach and the team replaced him with Wilf Peltier, a former Duluth Hornet who hadn't played or coached in 8 years. The team plummeted down the standings, finishing last in 1939. The sudden turn in their fortunes affected the team at the ticket office as well and the Skyhawks began to lose money. In early 1940, several players sued the team for lack of payment which prompted an investigation from the IRS. Ella Wible attempted to sell the team to a local businessman but he pulled out of negotiations on February 24. Two days later, the other AHA clubs voted to revoke the Wichita franchise and the remaining games were rescheduled. With no opponents to play, the Skyhawks suspended play and were disbanded shortly thereafter.

== Season-by-season results ==
Season	GP	W	L	T	Pts	Finish	Coach(es)	Postseason
1935–36	48	16	32	0	32	6th	Mike Goodman	missed
1936–37	48	18	27	3	36	5th	Mike Goodman	missed
1937–38	48	23	21	5	46	3rd	Mike Goodman	Lost in Semifinal
1938–39	48	15	33	7	30	5th	Wilf Peltier / Fern Headley	missed
1939–40	45	12	33	0	24	removed ^{†}	Danny Cox	—

† Wichita was removed from the league with 3 games left in the season.
