= 1954 Allan Cup =

Canadian senior ice hockey championship

The Allan Cup trophy

The 1954 Allan Cup was the Canadian senior ice hockey championship for the 1953–54 senior "A" season. The event was hosted by the Penticton V's and Penticton, Vernon, and Kelowna, British Columbia. The 1954 playoff marked the 46th time that the Allan Cup has been awarded.

== Teams ==
- Sudbury Wolves (Eastern Canadian Champions)
- Penticton V's (Western Canadian Champions)

== Playdowns ==
=== Allan Cup Best-of-Seven Series ===
Sudbury Wolves 2 - Penticton Vees 1
Penticton Vees 6 - Sudbury Wolves 2
Sudbury Wolves 3 - Penticton Vees 1
Sudbury Wolves 8 - Penticton Vees 2
Penticton Vees 6 - Sudbury Wolves 5 (OT)
Penticton Vees 6 - Sudbury Wolves 4
Penticton Vees 3 - Sudbury Wolves 2

=== Eastern Playdowns ===
Semi-final

Matane Red Rocks defeated Fredericton Capitals 4-games-to-none

Matane Red Rocks 4 - Fredericton Capitals 0
Matane Red Rocks 8 - Fredericton Capitals 3
Matane Red Rocks beat Fredericton Capitals
Matane Red Rocks 3 - Fredericton Capitals 2

Sudbury Wolves defeated Owen Sound Mercurys 4-games-to-3

Sudbury Wolves 4 - Owen Sound Mercurys 1
Sudbury Wolves 4 - Owen Sound Mercurys 0
Owen Sound Mercurys 5 - Sudbury Wolves 2
Owen Sound Mercurys 3 - Sudbury Wolves 1
Owen Sound Mercurys beat Sudbury Wolves
Sudbury Wolves 3 - Owen Sound Mercurys 1
Sudbury Wolves 4 - Owen Sound Mercurys 1

Final

Sudbury Wolves defeated Matane Red Rocks 4-games-to-2 with 1 tie

Sudbury Wolves 4 - Matane Red Rocks 4
Matane Red Rocks 3 - Sudbury Wolves 2
Sudbury Wolves 5 - Matane Red Rocks 3
Sudbury Wolves 4 - Matane Red Rocks 2
Sudbury Wolves 5 - Matane Red Rocks 3
Matane Red Rocks 5 - Sudbury Wolves 1
Sudbury Wolves 3 - Matane Red Rocks 0

=== Western Playdowns ===
Quarter-final

Winnipeg Maroons defeated Fort William Beavers 4-games-to-none

Winnipeg Maroons 2 - Fort William Beavers 1
Winnipeg Maroons 1 - Fort William Beavers 0
Winnipeg Maroons 3 - Fort William Beavers 1
Winnipeg Maroons 6 - Fort William Beavers 1

Semi-final

Winnipeg Maroons defeated Moose Jaw Millers 4-games-to-2 with 1 tie

Winnipeg Maroons 4 - Moose Jaw Millers 1
Moose Jaw Millers 3 - Winnipeg Maroons 2
Winnipeg Maroons 7 - Moose Jaw Millers 6
Winnipeg Maroons 3 - Moose Jaw Millers 3
Moose Jaw Millers 3 - Winnipeg Maroons 2
Winnipeg Maroons 8 - Moose Jaw Millers 2
Winnipeg Maroons 9 - Moose Jaw Millers 1

Final

Penticton Vees defeated Winnipeg Maroons 3-games-to-2 with 3 ties

Penticton Vees 4 - Winnipeg Maroons 4
Winnipeg Maroons 3 - Penticton Vees 2
Penticton Vees 7 - Winnipeg Maroons 1
Penticton Vees 4 - Winnipeg Maroons 4
Winnipeg Maroons 4 - Penticton Vees 0
Penticton Vees 4 - Winnipeg Maroons 4
Penticton Vees 5 - Winnipeg Maroons 1
Penticton Vees 5 - Winnipeg Maroons 2
