= 1948–49 WIHL season =

Hockey season

1948–49 was the third season of the Western International Hockey League.

The league champion Spokane Flyers went on to face the Windsor Spitfires in a best-of-seven series for the national amateur hockey title.

== Standings ==
Spokane Flyers	                                37-16-1	.694	261-198
Kimberley Dynamiters	18-23-1	.440	187-194
Nelson Maple Leafs	                                18-24-0	.429	162-184
Trail Smoke Eaters	15-25-2	.372	187-221

== League Championship final ==
Best of 5

   * Kimberley 4 Spokane 1
   * Spokane 4 Kimberley 1
   * Spokane 10 Kimberley 1
   * Spokane 2 Kimberley 0

Spokane Flyers beat Kimberley Dynamiters 3 wins to 1.

Note: Spokane Flyers were not eligible for the Allan Cup so the Kimberley Dynamiters advanced to the final. The Spokane Flyers did advance to the 1948-49 United States National Senior Championship.

== Semi final ==
Best of 5

   * Nelson 9 Trail 3
   * Nelson 3 Trail 1
   * Trail 5 Nelson 0
   * Trail 5 Nelson 3
   * Trail 5 Nelson 3

Trail Smoke Eaters beat Nelson Maple Leafs 3 wins to 2.

== Final ==
Best of 5

   * Trail 3 Kimberley 3
   * Trail 5 Kimberley 2
   * Trail 6 Kimberley 2
   * Kimberley 3 Trail 2
   * Trail 3 Kimberley 2

Trail Smoke Eaters beat Kimberley Dynamiters 3 wins to none, 1 tie.

This was the only senior league in the province so the Trail Smoke Eaters advanced to the 1948-49 Western Canada Allan Cup Playoffs.

=== All-Star teams ===
Position	First Team	Second Team
G	Ron Pickell, Spokane	Duke Scodellaro, Trail
D	Spence Tatchell, Nelson	George Barefoot, Nelson
D	Norm Blackett, Spokane	Scoop Bentley, Spokane
C	Frank Sullivan, Kimberley	Roy McBride, Spokane
RW	Bill Snider, Spokane	
LW	Cy Rouse, Spokane	
