= 1955 Ice Hockey World Championships =

1955 edition of the World Ice Hockey Championships

Tournament details
- Host country: West Germany
- Dates: 25 February – 6 March
- Teams: 9

Final positions
- Champions: Canada (16th title)
- Runners-up: Soviet Union
- Third place: Czechoslovakia
- Fourth place: United States

Tournament statistics
- Games played: 36
- Goals scored: 319 (8.86 per game)
- Attendance: 153,300 (4,258 per game)
- Scoring leader: (Czechoslovakia) Vlastimil Bubnik (17 goals)

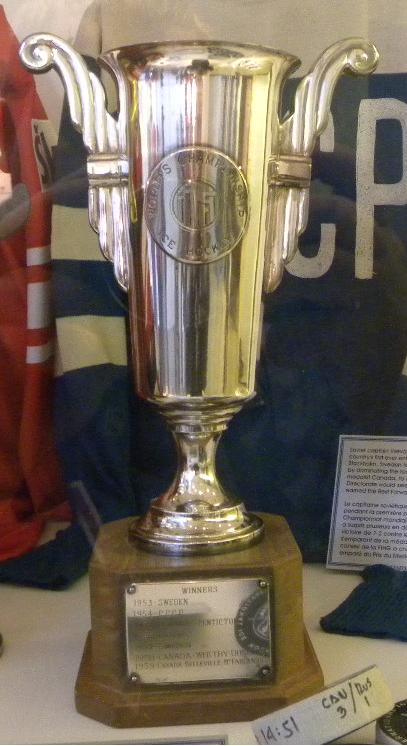
Trophy awarded for the 1955 World Championships

The 1955 Ice Hockey World Championships was the 22nd edition of the Ice Hockey World Championships. The tournament was held in Düsseldorf, Dortmund, Krefeld and Cologne, West Germany from February 25 to March 6, 1955. A total of 14 nations participated in this World Championship, which was a new record for the postwar era. As a result, the teams were seeded with the strongest 9 teams placed in Pool A (the championship pool) and the remaining 5 nations as well as the West German B team placed in Pool B.

Canada, represented by the Penticton Vees of the Okanagan Senior League, won their 16th international title. For the second straight year both the Soviets and Canadians were undefeated until they played each other in the final game of the tournament. This time Canada won 5–0, giving the Soviets the silver medal, and their second European Championship. Czechoslovakia won the bronze by dominating the weaker teams, drawing the Americans, and narrowly defeating the Swedes.

Despite the victory, the Canadian Press reported sentiments from Canadian players and spectators that "Canada should never again take part in the tournament under its present setup", and Canadian Amateur Hockey Association president W. B. George was concerned that the game in Europe took on political and religious meanings in which Canada did not want to become involved.

== World Championship Group A (West Germany) ==
=== Final Round ===
25 February	Czechoslovakia	7–0	Switzerland	Cologne

25 February	Canada	12–1	United States	Dortmund

25 February	Soviet Union	10–2	Finland	Düsseldorf

25 February	West Germany	4–5	Sweden	Krefeld

26 February	United States	8–1	Finland	Cologne

26 February	Soviet Union	2–1	Sweden	Dortmund

26 February	Canada	5–3	Czechoslovakia	Düsseldorf

26 February	West Germany	4–5	Poland	Krefeld

27 February	Canada	8–0	Poland	Cologne

27 February	West Germany	3–6	United States	Dortmund

27 February	Sweden	10–0	Switzerland	Düsseldorf

27 February	Soviet Union	4–0	Czechoslovakia	Krefeld

28 February	Soviet Union	8–2	Poland	Cologne

28 February	Canada	12–0	Finland	Düsseldorf

28 February	United States	7–3	Switzerland	Krefeld

1 March	Czechoslovakia	6–5	Sweden	Cologne

1 March	Poland	2–4	Switzerland	Düsseldorf

1 March	West Germany	7–1	Finland	Krefeld

2 March	Canada	11–1	Switzerland	Cologne

2 March	Sweden	9–0	Finland	Düsseldorf

2 March	West Germany	0–8	Czechoslovakia	Düsseldorf

2 March	Soviet Union	3–0	United States	Krefeld

3 March	Poland	6–3	Finland	Cologne

3 March	Canada	3–0	Sweden	Krefeld

3 March	West Germany	1–5	Soviet Union	Düsseldorf

3 March	Czechoslovakia	4–4	United States	Cologne

4 March	West Germany	1–10	Canada	Cologne

4 March	United States	6–2	Poland	Düsseldorf

4 March	Soviet Union	7–2	Switzerland	Krefeld

5 March	Finland	7–2	Switzerland	Cologne

5 March	Sweden	1–1	United States	Düsseldorf

5 March	Czechoslovakia	17–2	Poland	Krefeld

6 March	West Germany	8–3	Switzerland	Düsseldorf

6 March	Sweden	9–0	Poland	Cologne

6 March	Czechoslovakia	18–2	Finland	Düsseldorf

6 March	Canada	5–0	Soviet Union	Krefeld

=== Standings ===
Pos	Team	Pld	W	D	L	GF	GA	GD	Pts
1	Canada	8	8	0	0	66	6	+60	16
2	Soviet Union	8	7	0	1	39	13	+26	14
3	Czechoslovakia	8	5	1	2	63	22	+41	11
4	United States	8	4	2	2	33	29	+4	10
5	Sweden	8	4	1	3	40	16	+24	9
6	West Germany	8	2	0	6	28	43	−15	4
7	Poland	8	2	0	6	19	59	−40	4
8	Switzerland	8	1	0	7	15	59	−44	2
9	Finland	8	1	0	7	16	72	−56	2

=== Tournament awards ===
- Best players selected by the directorate:
  - Best Goaltender: (United States) Don Rigazio
  - Best Defenceman: (Czechoslovakia) Karel Gut
  - Best Forward: (Canada) Bill Warwick

== World Championship Group B (West Germany) ==
=== Final Round ===
25 February	Austria	3–2	Yugoslavia	Dortmund

25 February	West Germany B	2–2	Italy	Düsseldorf

27 February	Netherlands	6–3	Belgium	Dortmund

27 February	West Germany B	3–2	Austria	Köln

28 February	Yugoslavia	5–2	Belgium	Krefeld

28 February	Italy	3–1	Austria	Düsseldorf

2 March	Austria	5–3	Belgium	Krefeld

2 March	Italy	10–2	Netherlands	Dortmund

2 March	West Germany B	5–1	Yugoslavia	Düsseldorf

4 March	Italy	9–1	Yugoslavia	Cologne

4 March	West Germany B	11–1	Netherlands	Köln

5 March	Austria	6–1	Netherlands	Krefeld

5 March	West Germany B	11–1	Belgium	Düsseldorf

6 March	Italy	28–0	Belgium	Krefeld

6 March	Netherlands	9–1	Yugoslavia	Krefeld

=== Standings ===
Pos	Team	Pld	W	D	L	GF	GA	GD	Pts
10	Italy	5	4	1	0	52	6	+46	9
NC	West Germany B	5	4	1	0	30	5	+25	9
11	Austria	5	3	0	2	17	12	+5	6
12	Netherlands	5	2	0	3	19	31	−12	4
13	Yugoslavia	5	1	0	4	10	28	−18	2
14	Belgium	5	0	0	5	9	55	−46	0

Note:West Germany B games were unofficial.

== European Championship medal table ==
1st place, gold medalist(s)	Soviet Union
2nd place, silver medalist(s)	Czechoslovakia
3rd place, bronze medalist(s)	Sweden
4	West Germany
5	Poland
6	Switzerland
7	Finland
