= Milwaukee Sea Gulls =

- City: Milwaukee, Wisconsin
- League: United States Hockey League
- Operated: 1950–1951
- Home arena: Milwaukee Arena
- Colors: red, white, and blue
- Affiliate: Chicago Black Hawks

The Milwaukee Sea Gulls were a minor professional ice hockey team based in Milwaukee, Wisconsin. They operated in the United States Hockey League for just one season before the league folded in 1951.

== History ==
After their previous farm team, the Kansas City Mohawks, folded in 1950, the Chicago Black Hawks needed to find a site for their new minor league affiliate. The recently opened Milwaukee Arena provided a major incentive for the Hawks, as did its proximity to Chicago. That fall, the Milwaukee Sea Gulls played their first games. While the team featured many of the players from the Mohawks, they were also about as successful on the ice, as in, not much. Milwaukee finished last in the conference and missed the postseason.

During the league's summer meeting, the member teams decided to dissolve the USHL. Chicago wanted to keep minor club in Milwaukee and tried to get the AHL to accept it as a new member; however, the AHL balked due to the club's home arena. The Milwaukee Arena was scheduled to host the American Bowling Congress and prevent any ice hockey games from being played for the final month of the season. Without a league to play in, the Sea Gulls were disbanded, and Chicago ended up signing an affiliation agreement with the Calgary Stampeders for the following season.

== Season-by-season results ==
Season	GP	W	L	T	Pts	Finish	Postseason
1950–51	64	20	38	6	46	6th	missed
