= Napoleon Dame =

Canadian ice hockey player

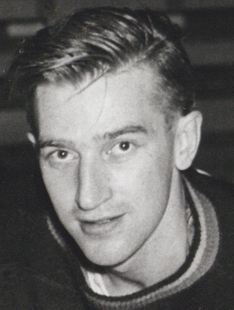
- Born: December 6, 1913 St. Albert, Alberta, Canada
- Died: April 14, 2006 (aged 92) Calgary, Alberta, Canada
- Height: 5 ft 9 in (175 cm)
- Weight: 160 lb (73 kg; 11 st 6 lb)
- Position: Left wing
- Shot: Left
- Played for: Montreal Canadiens
- National team: Canada
- Playing career: 1933–1950
Medal record
Men's ice hockey
Representing Canada
World Championships
Gold medal – first place	1939 Switzerland

Aurelia Napoleon "Bunny" Dame (December 6, 1913 – April 14, 2006) was a Canadian ice hockey forward. He played 34 games in the National Hockey League for the Montreal Canadiens during the 1941–42 season. The rest of his career lasted from 1933 to 1950 and was spent in senior leagues. He played for the Trail Smoke Eaters from 1936 to 1941, and with them were the Canadian national team at the 1939 World Championships, where he scored 9 goals in 8 games, winning the gold medal. Dame was born in St. Albert, Alberta.

== Career statistics ==
=== Regular season and playoffs ===
			Regular season					Playoffs
Season	Team	League	GP	G	A	Pts	PIM	GP	G	A	Pts	PIM
1930–31	Edmonton Canadians	EJrHL	3	1	0	1	0	—	—	—	—	—
1931–32	Edmonton Canadians	EJrHL	13	14	2	16	—	4	2	0	2	2
1932–33	Edmonton Canadians	EJrHL	11	—	—	—	16	3	1	0	1	0
1932–33	Edmonton Canadians	M-Cup	—	—	—	—	—	3	3	0	3	4
1933–34	Rossland Miners	WKHL	18	14	5	19	5	—	—	—	—	—
1934–35	Rossland Miners	WKHL	12	8	5	13	19	—	—	—	—	—
1935–36	Rossland Miners	WKHL	16	7	9	16	15	2	1	1	2	0
1936–37	Trail Smoke Eaters	WKHL	13	10	12	22	6	3	0	0	0	0
1937–38	Trail Smoke Eaters	WKHL	18	9	10	19	4	4	0	1	1	0
1937–38	Trail Smoke Eaters	Al-Cup	—	—	—	—	—	12	7	10	17	8
1938–39	Trail Smoke Eaters	Exhib	—	—	—	—	—	—	—	—	—	—
1939–40	Trail Smoke Eaters	WKHL	27	28	34	62	14	4	4	3	7	6
1939–40	Trail Smoke Eaters	Al-Cup	—	—	—	—	—	3	0	1	1	0
1940–41	Trail Smoke Eaters	WKHL	28	23	26	49	26	3	2	1	3	2
1940–41	Trail Smoke Eaters	Al-Cup	—	—	—	—	—	6	1	2	3	6
1941–42	Montreal Canadiens	NHL	31	2	5	7	4	—	—	—	—	—
1944–45	Calgary Currie Army	CNDHL	14	6	9	15	6	3	0	2	2	2
1945–46	Calgary Stampeders	WCSHL	36	23	31	54	14	4	3	3	6	0
1945–46	Calgary Stampeders	Al-Cup	—	—	—	—	—	11	6	5	11	5
1946–47	Calgary Stampeders	WCSHL	17	10	27	37	12	7	7	4	11	2
1946–47	Calgary Stampeders	Al-Cup	—	—	—	—	—	18	7	4	11	16
1947–48	Calgary Stampeders	WCSHL	46	14	22	36	22	11	4	4	8	8
1948–49	Calgary Stampeders	WCSHL	46	17	20	37	34	4	0	0	0	2
1949–50	Calgary Stampeders	WCSHL	44	14	15	29	23	11	1	2	3	4
1949–50	Calgary Stampeders	Al-Cup	—	—	—	—	—	14	2	2	4	4
WCSHL totals			189	78	115	193	105	37	15	13	28	16
WKHL totals			132	99	101	200	89	16	7	6	13	8
NHL totals			31	2	5	7	4	—	—	—	—	—

=== International ===
Year	Team	Event	GP	G	A	Pts	PIM
1939	Canada	WC	8	9	4	13	—
Senior totals			8	9	4	13	—
