= Johnny McCreedy =

Canadian ice hockey player

- Born: March 23, 1917 Winnipeg, Manitoba, Canada
- Died: December 7, 1979 (aged 68) Toronto, Ontario, Canada
- Height: 5 ft 9 in (175 cm)
- Weight: 160 lb (73 kg; 11 st 6 lb)
- Position: Right wing
- Shot: Right
- Played for: Toronto Maple Leafs
- National team: Canada
- Playing career: 1934–1945

John McCreedy (March 23, 1917 – December 7, 1979) was a Canadian ice hockey player who played 64 games in the National Hockey League with the Toronto Maple Leafs and was a member of two Stanley Cup-winning teams, in 1942 and 1945. Internationally, he played for the Canadian national team at the 1939 World Championships, winning a gold medal.

== Career ==
McCreedy was born in Winnipeg, Manitoba and raised in Kirkland Lake, Ontario. He later moved back to Winnipeg to begin his career. He became a dominant player in his hometown Winnipeg Monarchs, where he won the MJHL and then the 1937 Memorial Cup, where he scored four goals in the championship game. He then went to British Columbia to play for the Trail Smoke Eaters, eventually going back to Kirkland Lake to play there and then east to Nova Scotia to play for the Sydney Millionaires. He became a star player for each team and won the Allan Cup with Trail and Kirkland Lake. He also won gold with the Canadian national team at the 1939 World Championships.

McCreedy joined the NHL's Toronto Maple Leafs during the 1941–42 NHL season, where he became a solid goal scorer and player, scoring 15 goals and 8 assists for 23 points in 47 games. In the playoffs, he scored 4 goals and 3 assists for 7 points in 13 games as the Leafs won the 1942 Stanley Cup after being down 3 games to none in the final.

After his cup win, McCreedy served in World War II for the Royal Canadian Air Force. When he returned to the Leafs in 1945, his numbers failed to match those of his first season, scoring just 2 goals and 4 assists for 6 points in 17 games in the regular season and no points in 8 playoff games. However, he once again won the Stanley Cup and then retired from hockey after the win in 1945 at the age of 34.

== Post career ==
McCreedy settled in Sudbury, Ontario where he went on to pursue a career at INCO and was eventually promoted to vice-chairman. He died due to cancer on December 7, 1979, at the age of 68.

== Career statistics ==
=== Regular season and playoffs ===
			Regular season					Playoffs
Season	Team	League	GP	G	A	Pts	PIM	GP	G	A	Pts	PIM
1934–35	East Kildonan North Stars	MAHA	—	—	—	—	—	—	—	—	—	—
1935–36	Winnipeg Monarchs	MJHL	14	10	11	21	6	—	—	—	—	—
1936–37	Winnipeg Monarchs	MJHL	9	7	9	16	2	8	11	1	12	4
1936–37	Winnipeg Monarchs	M-Cup	—	—	—	—	—	9	13	5	18	4
1937–38	Trail Smoke Eaters	WKHL	20	19	17	36	46	5	2	7	9	0
1937–38	Trail Smoke Eaters	Al-Cup	—	—	—	—	—	12	4	2	6	15
1938–39	Trail Smoke Eaters	Exhib	—	—	—	—	—	—	—	—	—	—
1939–40	Kirkland Lake Blue Devils	Exhib	15	8	3	11	6	—	—	—	—	—
1939–40	Kirkland Lake Blue Devils	Al-Cup	—	—	—	—	—	20	20	6	26	17
1940–41	Sydney Millionaires	CBSHL	39	31	26	57	50	4	1	4	5	4
1940–41	Sydney Millionaires	Al-Cup	—	—	—	—	—	17	11	16	27	18
1941–42	Toronto Maple Leafs	NHL	47	15	8	23	14	13	4	3	7	6
1942–43	Toronto RCAF	TIHL	12	9	13	22	12	7	7	6	13	4
1942–43	Toronto RCAF	Al-Cup	—	—	—	—	—	4	1	2	3	5
1943–44	Brantford RCAF	OHA Sr	—	—	—	—	—	—	—	—	—	—
1944–45	Toronto Maple Leafs	NHL	17	2	4	6	11	8	0	0	0	10
NHL totals			64	17	20	37	8	8	11	1	12	4

=== International ===
Year	Team	Event	GP	G	A	Pts	PIM
1939	Canada	WC	7	3	6	9	0
Senior totals			7	3	6	9	0

== Awards and achievements ==
- Turnbull Cup MJHL Championship (1937)
- Memorial Cup Championship (1937)
- Allan Cup Championships (1938 & 1940)
- World Championship Gold Medalist (1939)
- Stanley Cup Championships (1942 & 1945)
- Inducted into the Manitoba Sports Hall of Fame and Museum in 2004
- Honoured Member of the Manitoba Hockey Hall of Fame
