= Arthur Nash (ice hockey) =

Canadian ice hockey player

- Born: September 5, 1914 Thunder Bay, Ontario, Canada
- Died: January 18, 2000 (aged 85)
- Height: 5 ft 5 in (165 cm)
- Weight: 135 lb (61 kg; 9 st 9 lb)
- Position: Goaltender
- Played for: Port Arthur Bearcats; Wembley Monarchs; Kimberley Dynamiters
- National team: Canada
- Playing career: 1931–1951

Olympic medal record

Men's Ice hockey
Silver medal – second place	1936 Garmisch-Partenkirchen	Team competition

Arthur Lawrence "Jakie" Nash (September 5, 1914 – January 18, 2000) was a Canadian ice hockey player who competed in the 1936 Winter Olympics as a member of the Canadian ice hockey team, which won the silver medal.

Nash was a member of the 1936 Port Arthur Bearcats, which won the silver medal for Canada in ice hockey at the 1936 Winter Olympics. In 1987 he was inducted into the Northwestern Ontario Sports Hall of Fame as a member of that Olympic team.

== Early life ==
Born in Thunder Bay, Ontario, Nash was a goaltender for the Port Arthur Bearcats, a hockey team based in Port Arthur, Ontario.

== Career ==
In 1935 the Bearcats were the runner-up in the Allan Cup, which earned him a trip to represent Canada at the 1936 Winter Olympics ice hockey event where he won the Silver Medal. After the Olympics he moved to England and played for the Wembley Monarchs in the English National League from 1936 through 1938. He later returned to Canada and played at least one full season (1941–1942) with the Kimberley Dynamiters of the Alberta-British Columbia Senior League. He was still playing internationally as late as 1948.

Nash later retired to Fairmont Hot Springs, British Columbia.
