= Martin Zoborosky =

Canadian ice hockey player

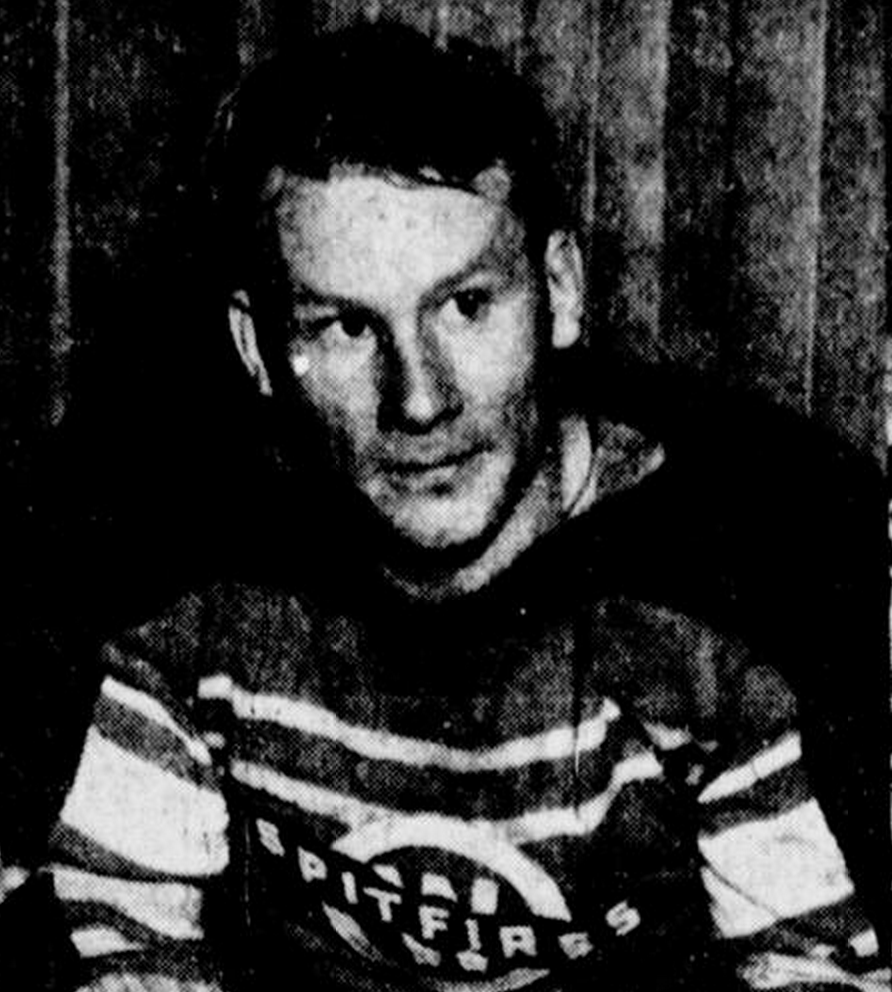
- Zoborosky pictured in a 1942 newspaper as a member of the New Westminster Spitfires
- Born: November 12, 1916 Moose Jaw, Saskatchewan, Canada
- Died: June 1, 1989 (aged 72) Tucson, Arizona, U.S.
- Height: 5 ft 10 in (178 cm)
- Weight: 180 lb (82 kg; 12 st 12 lb)
- Position: Defence
- Shot: Right
- Played for: Chicago Black Hawks
- Playing career: 1934–1945

Martin Percy "Buster" Zoborosky^{[n1]} (November 12, 1916 – June 1, 1989), later known as Martin Edwards, was a Canadian professional ice hockey defenceman who played in one National Hockey League game for the Chicago Black Hawks during the 1944–45 season.

== Biography ==
Zoborosky was born in November 1916 in Moose Jaw, Saskatchewan to Martin and Elizabeth Zoborosky. He started his hockey career in 1934 with the Moose Jaw Canucks, in the Saskatchewan Junior Hockey League, of his hometown. He would continue playing in Moose Jaw until the 1935–36 season, where he split time between the Canucks and Moose Jaw Hardware of the Saskatchewan Senior Hockey League. The following season he played for the Prince Albert Mintos in the Senior League, playing 20 games, registering one point and 28 penalty minutes. The following season he played for the Swift Current Indians of that same league. In the next few years, he would go on to play in leagues in British Columbia, suiting up for Kimberley, New Westminster and Vancouver. During his time with Vancouver, he played for the Royal Canadian Air Force team, in which he was a member, having joined in the early 1940s. He would serve in the RCAF for four years. During his career in British Columbia and Saskatchewan, he participated in 3 championship playoffs - the Memorial Cup in Saskatchewan and Allan Cup in British Columbia (2 times). During his time in Swift Current, he was part of the championship-winning team of 1941.

In the 1944–45 season, Zoborosky played one game, on December 31, 1944, for the Chicago Black Hawks (against the Detroit Red Wings) in the National Hockey League, registering two penalty minutes in a 4–0 loss. He also played a single game for the Providence Reds of the American Hockey League in that same season. In 1946, Zoborosky headed to Prague, Czechoslovakia to serve as player-coach of a hockey team there, despite not knowing the Czech language. Upon his return to Canada in 1947, he lauded the rising popularity of ice hockey as a sport in Europe, adding that the possibility for scouting hockey talent out of Europe was strong. For the 1948 season he again returned to Europe, this time in charge of 10 hockey clubs, with 10 assistant coaches, travelling between them and supervising play.

A defenceman for his whole hockey career, he was nicknamed by his teammates as "Buster" or "Bus", perhaps for his "truck-like" play. A 1943 article from Vancouver described that he "fought like a tiger [and] handed out lumps all [game]". Described as an unassuming and likeable person, he was also said to not hold grudges against other opposing players, amongst whom he was held in high regard.

== Career statistics ==
=== Regular season and playoffs ===
			Regular season					Playoffs
Season	Team	League	GP	G	A	Pts	PIM	GP	G	A	Pts	PIM
1934–35	Moose Jaw Canucks	S-SJHL	6	4	0	4	9	—	—	—	—	—
1934–35	Moose Jaw Canucks	M-Cup	—	—	—	—	—	1	0	0	0	2
1935–36	Moose Jaw Canucks	S-SJHL	3	0	0	0	8	4	0	1	1	8
1935–36	Moose Jaw Hardware	SSHL	6	1	0	1	12	—	—	—	—	—
1936–37	Prince Albert Mintos	SSHL	20	0	1	1	28	2	0	0	0	4
1937–38	Swift Current Indians	SIHA	—	—	—	—	—	—	—	—	—	—
1941–42	Kimberley Dynamiters	ABCSL	27	1	1	2	24	1	0	0	0	2
1941–42	Kimberley Dynamiters	Al-Cup	—	—	—	—	—	1	0	0	0	0
1942–43	Vancouver RCAF	PCHL	11	2	1	3	32	4	0	0	0	20
1942–43	Vancouver RCAF	Al-Cup	—	—	—	—	—	5	1	2	3	20
1943–44	Vancouver St. Regis	NNDHL	7	1	0	1	6	—	—	—	—	—
1944–45	Chicago Black Hawks	NHL	1	0	0	0	2	—	—	—	—	—
1944–45	Providence Reds	AHL	1	0	0	0	0	—	—	—	—	—
1946–47	I. ČLTK Prag	CZE	7	4	—	—	—	—	—	—	—	—
NHL totals			1	0	0	0	2	—	—	—	—	—

== See also ==
- List of players who played only one game in the NHL

== Notes ==
- ^[n1] Last name also spelled as Zoboroski and Zobrosky
