= Joe Benoit =

Canadian ice hockey player

- Born: February 27, 1916 St. Albert, Alberta, Canada
- Died: October 19, 1981 (aged 65) Spokane, Washington, USA
- Height: 5 ft 10 in (178 cm)
- Weight: 160 lb (73 kg; 11 st 6 lb)
- Position: Right wing
- Shot: Right
- Played for: Montreal Canadiens
- Playing career: 1940–1947

Joseph Benoit (February 27, 1916 – October 19, 1981) was a Canadian ice hockey right winger. He played in the National Hockey League for the Montreal Canadiens from 1940 to 1946. He missed the 1943–44 season while serving with the Canadian Forces in the Second World War, and the 1944–45 season playing for the Calgary Army team.

== Playing career ==
He preceded Maurice Richard on the "Punch Line" at right wing. He scored 20 goals in 1941–42 in a 48-game schedule, and 30 goals in 1942–43 in a 50-game schedule. Benoit then enlisted with the armed forces and served in the Second World War.

In his NHL career, Benoit played in 185 games. He recorded 75 goals and 69 assists. He also appeared in 11 playoff games, scoring six goals and adding three assists. He won the Stanley Cup in 1946.

== Career statistics ==
=== Regular season and playoffs ===
			Regular season					Playoffs
Season	Team	League	GP	G	A	Pts	PIM	GP	G	A	Pts	PIM
1935–36	Edmonton Athletic Club	EJrHL	8	8	2	10	4	3	0	0	0	2
1936–37	Trail Smoke Eaters	WKHL	13	13	7	20	18	—	—	—	—	—
1937–38	Trail Smoke Eaters	WKHL	20	26	6	32	21	5	5	3	8	8
1937–38	Trail Smoke Eaters	Al-Cup	—	—	—	—	—	12	12	7	19	9
1939–40	Trail Smoke Eaters	WKHL	24	26	17	43	49	4	2	3	5	6
1939–40	Trail Smoke Eaters	Al-Cup	—	—	—	—	—	3	0	1	1	4
1940–41	Montreal Canadiens	NHL	45	16	16	32	32	3	4	0	4	2
1941–42	Montreal Canadiens	NHL	46	20	16	36	27	3	1	0	1	5
1942–43	Montreal Canadiens	NHL	49	30	27	57	23	5	1	3	4	4
1944–45	Calgary Currie Army	CNDHL	13	7	3	10	8	2	1	0	1	2
1945–46	Montreal Canadiens	NHL	39	9	10	19	8	—	—	—	—	—
1946–47	Montreal Canadiens	NHL	6	0	0	0	4	—	—	—	—	—
1946–47	Springfield Indians	AHL	34	9	10	19	4	2	0	0	0	0
1948–49	Montreal Royals	QSHL	1	0	0	0	0	—	—	—	—	—
1948–49	Spokane Flyers	WIHL	—	—	—	—	—	—	—	—	—	—
NHL totals			185	75	69	144	94	11	6	3	9	11

=== International ===
Year	Team	Event	GP	G	A	Pts	PIM
1939	Canada	WC	8	8	4	12	—
Senior totals			8	8	4	12	—
