= Ollie Reinikka =

Canadian ice hockey player

- Born: August 2, 1901 Shuswap, British Columbia, Canada
- Died: November 2, 1962 (aged 61) Canmore, Alberta, Canada
- Height: 5 ft 10 in (178 cm)
- Weight: 160 lb (73 kg; 11 st 6 lb)
- Position: Centre
- Shot: Right
- Played for: Vancouver Maroons; New York Rangers
- Playing career: 1920–1937

Alver Mathias "Ollie Rocco" Reinikka (August 2, 1901 – November 2, 1962) was a Canadian professional ice hockey forward. In the 1926–27 season, he played 16 games in the National Hockey League for the New York Rangers. Reinikka was born in Shuswap, British Columbia, but grew up in Canmore, Alberta.

== Playing career ==
Prior to his short stint with the Rangers Ollie Reinikka played with the Vancouver Maroons of the WCHL.

Reinikka, of Finnish descent, picked up the nickname of "Ollie Rocco" while playing with the New York Rangers. The Madison Square Garden publicity department team of Bruno and Blythe gave nicknames intended to help attract more diverse audiences to games, in this case, Italian.

== Career statistics ==
=== Regular season and playoffs ===
			Regular season					Playoffs
Season	Team	League	GP	G	A	Pts	PIM	GP	G	A	Pts	PIM
1920–21	Canmore Roses	ASHL	6	1	0	1	0	—	—	—	—	—
1921–22	Canmore Roses	ASHL	—	—	—	—	—	—	—	—	—	—
1922–23	Canmore Roses	ASHL	6	2	0	2	—	—	—	—	—	—
1923–24	Canmore Roses	ASHL	—	—	—	—	—	—	—	—	—	—
1924–25	Vancouver Maroons	WCHL	19	1	0	1	4	—	—	—	—	—
1925–26	Vancouver Maroons	WHL	27	10	2	12	8	—	—	—	—	—
1926–27	New York Rangers	NHL	16	0	0	0	0	—	—	—	—	—
1926–27	Springfield Indians	Can-Am	16	0	0	0	10	4	1	0	1	4
1927–28	Stratford Nationals	Can-Pro	42	8	3	11	12	5	1	0	1	2
1928–29	Hamilton Tigers	Can-Pro	19	0	3	3	8	—	—	—	—	—
1928–29	Seattle Eskimos	PCHL	15	2	1	3	2	5	1	1	2	0
1929–30	Seattle Eskimos	PCHL	35	12	3	15	12	—	—	—	—	—
1930–31	London Tecumsehs	IHL	44	7	5	12	19	—	—	—	—	—
1931–32	London Tecumsehs	IHL	26	2	0	2	2	—	—	—	—	—
1934–35	Rossland Miners	WKHL	16	6	8	14	3	2	0	1	1	2
1935–36	Rossland Miners	WKHL	4	1	2	3	1	2	1	3	4	0
1936–37	Rossland Miners	WKHL	14	1	7	8	6	—	—	—	—	—
WCHL/WHL totals			46	11	2	13	12	—	—	—	—	—
NHL totals			16	0	0	0	0	—	—	—	—	—
