= Bobby Kromm =

Canadian ice hockey coach (1928–2010)

Robert Kromm
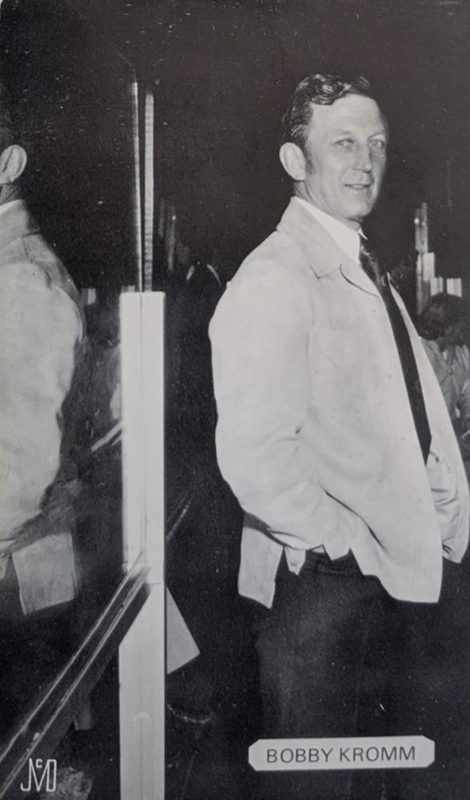
- Kromm with Detroit Red Wings in late 1970s
- Born: June 8, 1928; Calgary, Alberta, Canada
- Died: June 9, 2010 (aged 82); Livonia, Michigan, U.S.
- Occupation: Former NHL coach
- Years active: 1977–1980 (as NHL coach)
- Employer: Detroit Red Wings

Robert Kromm (June 8, 1928 – June 9, 2010) was a National Hockey League (NHL) and World Hockey Association (WHA) head coach. He was the coach behind the first Avco World Trophy championship for the Winnipeg Jets, with the high-flying team losing only one playoff game in 1976. He won the Robert Schmertz Trophy as WHA Coach of the Year for the 1975-76 season. That fall, he was as an assistant coach for Canada at the inaugural Canada Cup. He left the Jets for the Detroit Red Wings in 1977. In his first season, he became the first coach in franchise history to win the Jack Adams Award as NHL Coach of the Year. He led the 1977–78 Red Wings to a 37-point improvement on their 16 win season the year previous, and a second-place finish in the Norris Division. The Red Wings made the playoffs for the first time in eight years.

In 1961, Kromm took an underdog team from Trail, British Columbia to an Ice Hockey World Championships win over the Russians. The Trail Smoke Eaters represented Canada that year. Kromm coached the Trail Smoke Eaters to the 1962 Allan Cup championship and were chosen to represent Canada at the 1963 Ice Hockey World Championships. When the Western International Hockey League did not operate during the 1962–63 season, the team appealed to the Canadian Amateur Hockey Association (CAHA) for exhibition games in preparation for the World Championships. Canada placed fourth at the 1963 World Championships, its worst result at the time. The CAHA and the Smoke Eaters disagreed on the team's financial statement of the European tour, and Kromm faulted the CAHA for lack of financial assistance and additional players to strengthen the team. CAHA president Art Potter felt that the CAHA had done nothing wrong and accused Kromm of poor judgment in choosing players. The team perceived Potter's statement as censuring the coach and was criticized as "unfair and unsportsmanlike".

Kromm's son, Richard, played ten years in the NHL for the Calgary Flames and New York Islanders.

His granddaughter daughter Erica played professional ice hockey for the Calgary Inferno in the Canadian Women's Hockey League, appearing in the 2016 Clarkson Cup finals, Having also played in the PWHPA, she became a member of the Long Island Sharks women's ice hockey coaching staff.

Born in Calgary, Alberta. Kromm died from complications of colorectal cancer one day after his 82nd birthday in Livonia, Michigan.

== NHL/WHA coaching record ==
Team	Year	Regular season						Postseason			
Team	Year	G	W	L	OTL	Pts	Finish	W	L	Win%	Result
Winnipeg Jets (WHA)	1975–76	81	52	27	2	106	1st in Canadian	12	1	.923	Avco Cup Champions (HOU)
Winnipeg Jets (WHA)	1976–77	80	46	32	2	94	2nd in West	11	9	.550	Lost in Avco Cup Finals (QUE)
Detroit Red Wings (NHL)	1977–78	80	32	34	14	78	2nd in Norris	3	4	.429	Lost in Quarterfinals (MON)
Detroit Red Wings (NHL)	1978–79	80	23	41	16	62	5th in Norris	—	—	—	—
Detroit Red Wings (NHL)	1979–80	71	24	36	11	(63)	(fired)	—	—	—	—
WHA Total		161	98	59	4			23	10	.697	
NHL Total		231	79	111	41			3	4	.429	

Preceded by Bobby Hull	Head coach of the Winnipeg Jets; 1975–77	Succeeded by Larry Hillman
Preceded by Larry Wilson	Head coach of the Detroit Red Wings; 1977–80	Succeeded by Ted Lindsay
Preceded by Scotty Bowman	Winner of the Jack Adams Award; 1978	Succeeded by Al Arbour
