= Trail Smoke Eaters (senior) =

Canadian men's ice hockey team

The Trail Smoke Eaters (previously known as the Trail Hockey Club) were a senior-level men's ice hockey team from Trail, British Columbia, that played from 1926 to 1987. They were recognized as being one of the best senior hockey teams in Canadian history. The Smoke Eaters won their first Allan Cup in 1938; they won the 1939 World Ice Hockey Championships and the 1961 World Ice Hockey Championships; and they won another Allan Cup in 1962.

== Overview ==
The Trail Smoke Eaters played out of the small smelting town of Trail in southeastern British Columbia and were subsidized by a local smelting company to provide recreation and entertainment for the isolated community. Playing in the West Kootenay League since the 1923–24 season, Trail's hockey team was originally named the Trail Hockey Club, and they won the league and the provincial championship under this name in 1927. They won the province championship but lost out in the final in the 1927 Western Canada Allan Cup Playoffs.

The team's name was changed after 1926–27 to the Trail Smoke Eaters, and under this name they won six more consecutive provincial titles.

The Smoke Eaters won their first Allan Cup in 1938 and won a trip to the 1939 World Championship. They won another World Championship in 1961 and another Allan Cup in 1962.

They folded on January 29,1987, a victim of the sharp drop in senior hockey popularity. Their colours are now carried by a junior team of the same name.

== History ==
The 1926–27 season marked the beginning of Trail's rise to hockey fame, for the first time in history the team won the Savage Cup, emblematic of the provincial hockey supremacy of British Columbia. The team was coached by Carl Kendall, a real hockey mastermind. The players wearing the Trail colours that year were: Percy Jackson (Goal); Howard Anderson (ice hockey) Howard Anderson, Harry Brown (ice hockey) Harry Brown, Moynes, Jim Hanson, P.R. McDonald, Olaf Gustafson, George "Curly" Wheatley, Clarence Reddick, Frank Lauriente, DePasquale, Matovich; and Dick Dimock, general manager. That season Trail defeated Rossland in a two-game total goals series, by winning the first game 2–0, and Rossland fighting back to take the second encounter 3–2. Trail had little trouble in eliminating the Vancouver Towers 5–1 in a similar total goals series. They added the BC-Alberta championship to their list by blasting Canmore 15–4 in a two-game, total goals affair. Trail made short order of Delisle, Saskatchewan, beating them 2–0 and 9–0. The Fort William Thundering Herd proved too much for the Trail team, and knocked them over 8–3 in a series played in the Denman Street Arena in Vancouver before capacity crowds.

=== 1927–28 through 1936–37 ===
The hockey fever caught on in Trail, and they installed artificial ice in their Riverside Arena in 1927–28; and they were packing in 3,000 fans per game from a population base of 7,000 persons. Trail won seven consecutive B.C. championships, before the Kimberley Dynamiters dethroned them in 1933–34.

=== 1938 Allan Cup ===
Trail's first Allan Cup in 1937–38 conquest was one of the most successful seasons in Allan Cup history. During the 1937–38 season the West Kootenay Hockey League operated on an extended basis, to include two teams from southern Alberta; Lethbridge and Coleman. Kimberley, Nelson, Trail and Rossland completed the league and the clubs played an ambitious schedule of 144 games. Remember, in those days a team only had a roster of ten players. The playoffs were on a sectional basis, with the winners of the Eastern Division playing off with the Western Division champs. Kimberley eliminated the Lethbridge Maple Leafs in the Eastern sectional playoffs, and their triumph over the glittering Maple Leafs, regarded as one of the best ever assembled clubs in Alberta, was considered a real upset. The cagey Dynamiters edged the Leafs 7–5 and 6–4 in a hard-fought series; however, they proved an easy pushover for the smooth Trail Smoke Eaters. The Smokies breezed through the Dynamiters in three straight games, by convincing scores of 6–0, 9–3 and 8–0. Trail had a real battle on their hands to reach the finals by shading the stubborn Nelson Maple Leafs 1–0 and 4–3 in the Western Division finals. The only highlight for the Dynamiters that season was that Ralph Redding, their slick forward, walked away with the league scoring championship, by registering 36 goals and 23 assists for 59 points. His nearest opponent was teammate Red Goble with 44 points. Ab Cronie was right behind Goble with 43 points. The Smokies powerful line of McCreedy, Duchak and Kowcinak were far behind with 36, 36 and 37 points respectively. Trail won the B.C. championship and the Savage Cup that season, when Vancouver defaulted the series to the Smoke Eaters.

Goalie Duke Scodellaro was unbeatable in the BC-Alberta championship final, by blanking the Calgary Rangers 5–0 and 7–0 in a best-of-three series. Next came the Flin Flon Bombers, the Saskatchewan champions, with Trail taking the first game with ease, by a 6–0 verdict; but Trail lost the second contest 4–2. The Smoke Eaters made no mistakes in the rubber game, blanking the Bombers 5–0. Edmonton was the scene of the opening game of the Western Canada finals, against the Port Arthur Bear-Cats; and with Trail coming back from a two-goal deficit in the third period to force overtime, and they ended up with a 5–3 victory in two periods of extra time. Trail jumped all over Port Arthur in Calgary in the second game, winning 8–1, and finished the series in three straight games by shellacking the Cats 7–3 in the third game played in Saskatoon. The scene was all set for the finals against the Cornwall Flyers, and the Calgary fans adopted the Smoke Eaters and cheered them on to victory, along with the 500 ardent fans who traveled from Trail by a special train. Trail, a flock of speed merchants moulded into a high geared passing machine by coach Elmer Piper, climaxed the long fight by defeating Cornwall's Flyers three games to one, in a best-of-five championship series. The Smoke Eaters won the opener 6–4 and took the second fixture 8–2. Cornwall won the third game 2–1, with Flyers goalie Floyd Perras turning in a sparkling performance. Trail's netminder, Duke Scodellaro, lost his bid for a shut out in the final contest when the Flyers scored with 45 seconds remaining in the game, and Trail took the match 3–1. Trail rolled up a convincing record in their Allan Cup hunt by scoring 91 goals and allowed 26, in 17 games: and won 15 fixtures—seven by shutouts, and lost only two games. The Smoke Eaters homecoming was the greatest hockey reception ever accorded a team of champions in the west. More than 7,000 fans packed the city's business section and overflowed to the roofs of nearby buildings, to welcome their heroes. The Smoke Eaters arrived home in a special railroad car, and were transferred from the train to a special brightly decorated flat car for the public's admiration, as the train crept down from Tadanac by way of Rossland Avenue. As the train stopped at the depot, the whole city went wild. Mayor E.L. Groutage officially welcomed the team and the players were interviewed by radio station CJAT. After the ceremony the players climbed on a fire truck and toured the downtown. En route home, they were officially welcomed at Nelson, and were placed on a fire truck, and proudly paraded up town to the cheers of thousands at the Lake city. Members of the famous Trail Smoke Eaters, Allan Cup champions, were: Duke Scodellaro (Goal), Buck Buchanan (spare goalie); Jimmy Haight, Mel Snowden, Tom Johnston (ice hockey) Tom Johnston, Ab Cronie, Bunny Dame, Joe Benoit, Dave Duchak, Dick Kowcinak, Johnny McCreedy, Mickey Brennen, Jimmy Morris (ice hockey)|Jimmy Morris; and utility forward Bob Marshall. Their coach was Elmer Piper.

=== 1938–39 season ===
The 1938–39 Trail Smoke Eaters represented Canada at the 1939 World Ice Hockey Championships.

The Trail Smoke Eaters on their 1938–39 European tour set in the annuals of international hockey what is likely to stand for many years. They were true ambassadors to the world, and displayed a brand of hockey that saw excellent stick-handling, and superb passing, and with little body contact.

Everywhere on the Continent, the Smoke Eaters found themselves surrounded by large crowds, who chased them in autograph-seeking fervor, after every appearance.

It was generally agreed that their inspiring play did more to promote the game throughout the nine countries they visited, than the efforts of any other single organization.

The Smoke Eaters made only a couple of changes from their Allan Cup team, and made the grueling trip with only 13 players. Coach Elmer Piper left the club for a similar post with the Turner Valley Oilers of the Alberta Senior League, after only spending one season with the Smokies. His position was taken over by Ab Cronie, who doubled as a playing-coach. Captain Dave Duchak also passed up the trip by accepting a job as the playing-coach of the Calgary Stampeders. Art Forrest, a native Trail product, returned after a stint with a hockey team in London, England, and filled in for Duchak. Forrest's trip was short cut, for while the Smoke Eaters were playing a two-game exhibition game series in Lethbridge against the Maple Leafs, on the first leg of their Trans-Canada tour, he was rushed to the hospital for an appendectomy. Benny Hayes, a slick forward with the Lethbridge Maple Leafs, was picked up by the Trail club, and proved himself a valuable member.

The Smoke Eaters only managed one exhibition at home, before starting their 15,000 mile trip, and that was an easy 8–1 victory over the newly formed Trail Blazers. Injuries played a big factor in the Smoke Eaters poor showing across Canada, and they only managed to win eight, tied one game, and lost six in the 15 game series--but they came on strong by winning six of their last seven games in Eastern Canada. They outscored the Canadian teams 65 goals to 41.

The Smoke Eaters embarked from the City of Halifax on 10 December, 1938, and arriving in Scotland, made their first European showing in Glasgow on 17 December, and won the game 4–2. It marked the beginning of a 55-game schedule, in which they won 53 games, tied one, and lost one. From the time the Smoke Eaters left Trail, until they returned with the World Championship, they played a total of 71 games - they won 62, lost seven and were held to two draws. Trail scored a total of 374 goals, and were scored on 177 times; their average game scored was 5.3 goals scored and the against average 1.5--a remarkable record which will probably never be equaled.

The ten-day World Championship Tournament started on February 3, 1939, and was held in Basel and Zurich; two of the greatest little cities perched in the picturesque Swiss Alps. Before the tournament ended on February 12, the Trail Smoke Eaters had won the hearts of all the Swiss fans and went about the business of winning the championship in methodical style. Trail sailed through the tournament without a single defeat and won eight straight games. In fact, they were only scored on once, by Czechoslovakia. The Czechoslovaks proved the toughest team to pass, as the low score indicated. The Smokies met the Czechs in the third round of the tourney and skated to a 4–1 triumph.

Here's the way the Trail Smoke Eaters marked up their victories: First round they beat the Netherlands 8–0 and Poland 4–0. In the second round they shut out Britain 4–0, and defeated Germany 9–0. In the third and final round they shut out Switzerland 7–0, before 16,000 fans, and continued their brilliant play by stopping Czechoslovakia 4–1, and blanking the United States 4–0. In the eight game finals the Smoke Eaters garnered 42 goals, with Bunny Dame pacing the team with nine goals. Bunny was followed by Joe Benoit and Jimmy Morris, seven; Dick Kowcinak, six; Johnny McCreedy four; Ab Cronie, three; Mel Snowden and Mickey Brennen, two each; and Tom Johnston a singleton. Cronie was the leading player in the assist department with nine; followed by McCreedy with seven. Joe Benoit was the overall point leader with 13.

Duke Scodellaro received real praise for his outstanding goaltending, and the European fans said, "They never saw his equal." Duke had a powerhouse defence playing in front of him: in Jimmy Haight, Tom Johnston and Mel Snowden Joe Benoit, Ab Cronie and Bunny Dame were Trail's number one line; the Smoke Eaters other forward line consisted of McCreedy, Kowcinak and Brennen. Benny Hayes was used as the utility forward; Buck Buchanan (a former North Battleford Beaver) was the backup goalie to Duke Scodellaro. Buchanan turned in a number of highly praised performances.

O.H. Nelson, President of the Smoke Eaters, made the overseas tour, and acted a manager - and proved himself a most popular man.

The Smoke Eaters certainly advertised the city of Trail. Throughout Europe and by not wearing the customary Canadian white uniform, the club decided to go with their famous, and colourful, orange and black jerseys. Sports writers all over the country were intrigued by the symbols of the Smoke Eater name, and the stacks belching out a stream of smoke, high above the CM&S (Consolidated Mining & Smelting) Smelter.

=== 1962 to 1963 ===
The Trail Smoke Eaters won the 1962 Allan Cup and were chosen to represent Canada at the 1963 Ice Hockey World Championships. When the Western International Hockey League did not operate during the 1962–63 season, the team appealed to the Canadian Amateur Hockey Association (CAHA) for exhibition games in preparation for the World Championships. CAHA president Art Potter noted that reports of the Smoke Eaters asking for money had not come from team executives, and that the CAHA had not planned for the team to be in financial difficulty.

Journalist Mordecai Richler reported that the Canadian national team was given second class hotel accommodations and cold pork chops for breakfast at the 1963 Ice Hockey World Championships in Sweden, and that Swedish newspaper headlines stated that "The Canadians want to see blood". Richler quoted Potter as saying, "These are Cold War tactics to demoralize the Canadian team. They always stab us in the back here".

Canada placed fourth at the 1963 World Championships, its worst result at the time. The CAHA and the Smoke Eaters disagreed on the team's financial statement of the European tour, and coach Bobby Kromm faulted the CAHA for lack of financial assistance and additional players to strengthen the team. Potter felt that the CAHA had done nothing wrong and accused Kromm of poor judgment in choosing players. The team perceived Potter's statement as censuring the coach and was criticized as "unfair and unsportsmanlike".

== Championships ==
World Ice Hockey Championships

- 1939 World Ice Hockey Championships
- 1961 World Ice Hockey Championships

Allan Cups

- 1938 Allan Cup
- 1962 Allan Cup

Savage Cups

- 1927, 1928, 1929, 1930, 1931, 1932, 1933, 1938, 1940, 1941, 1946, 1948, 1949, 1952, 1960, 1962, 1979, 2004

Coy Cups

- 1947, 1950, 1951, 1953, 1954, 1955, 1961, 2002, 2003

== See also ==
- Alberta-British Columbia Senior League
- List of Canadian national ice hockey team rosters
