= Art Potter =

Canadian ice hockey administrator (1909–1998)

- Born: August 8, 1909; Ramsgate, Kent, England
- Died: January 19, 1998 (aged 88); Edmonton, Alberta, Canada
- Occupation: Northern Alberta Dairy Pool manager
- Known for: Canadian Amateur Hockey Association and Alberta Amateur Hockey Association president
- Awards: Alberta Sports Hall of Fame; Alberta Hockey Hall of Fame; Canadian Centennial Medal

Arthur Thomas Potter (August 8, 1909 – January 19, 1998) was a Canadian ice hockey administrator. He was president of the Canadian Amateur Hockey Association (CAHA) from 1962 to 1964, and oversaw the establishment of a permanent Canada men's national ice hockey team after he decided that sending the reigning Allan Cup champion to international competitions was no longer the answer. He felt that Canada needed discipline to handle Cold War tactics and propaganda at the Ice Hockey World Championships, sought to give its best players to develop as a team, and supported a plan by Father David Bauer to assemble a team of amateur student athletes to complete at the 1964 Winter Olympics.

Potter was against the increasing influence of the National Hockey League (NHL) into amateur hockey, and blamed minor league professional teams for the decline of senior ice hockey and loss of prestige for the Allan Cup. He wanted to keep players in junior ice hockey as long as possible, and favoured the revised NHL Amateur Draft agreement to financially support junior hockey which ended the direct sponsorship of teams by the NHL. He had multiple disagreements with coach Hap Emms during two Memorial Cup finals, suspended radio announcers for comments that he felt were detrimental to the game, sought rules to sanction teams and individuals who abused on-ice officials or the CAHA, and advocated using a three-man officiating system to reduce incidents.

Potter was an executive for the Alberta Amateur Hockey Association from 1943 to 1959, including seven years as vice-president and four years as president. He was known as "Mr. Hockey" in Edmonton, where he was a lifelong volunteer to organize minor ice hockey, which included serving as president of the Edmonton and District Hockey Association. He was elected to four terms as chairman of the Edmonton Recreation Board, assisted in the planning and construction of the South Edmonton Sports Centre, and was inducted into the Edmonton Sports Hall of Fame. He received the Canadian Centennial Medal in 1967, was inducted into the builder category of the Alberta Sports Hall of Fame in 1968, and was part of the inaugural class of inductees into the Alberta Hockey Hall of Fame in 1982.

== Early life and Edmonton hockey ==
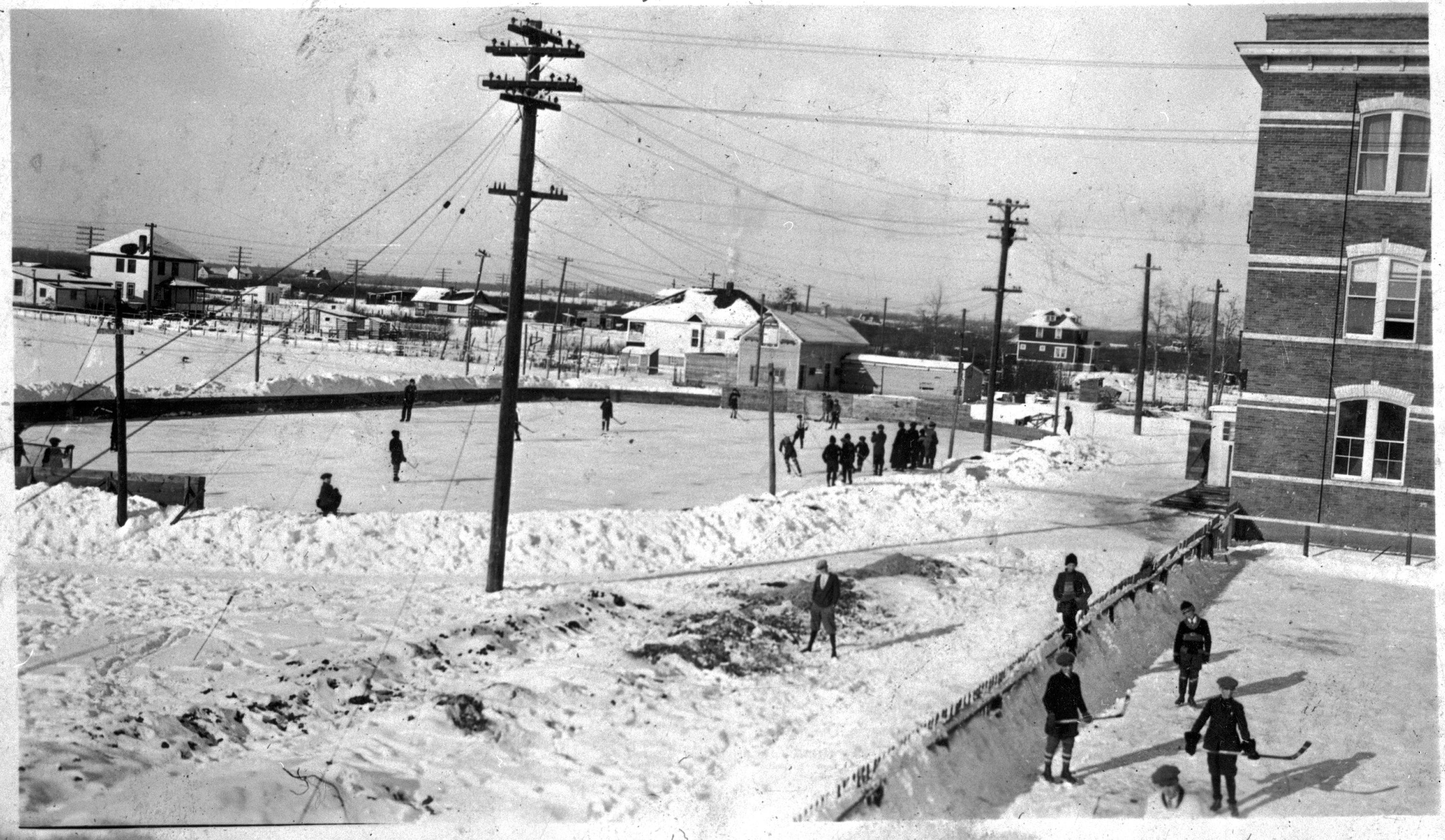
Outdoor ice hockey in Edmonton c. 1926

Arthur Thomas Potter was born on August 8, 1909, in Ramsgate, Kent, England. He was the youngest of five children to Annie and George Potter, the latter who worked as a blacksmith. They departed Liverpool aboard SS Laurentic on April 30, immigrated to Canada at Quebec City on May 8, 1910, then settled in Edmonton, Alberta.

As an 18-year-old in 1927, Potter began coaching the Edmonton Elites junior ice hockey team. He also volunteered as a convenor for the Edmonton Junior Hockey League in which the team played. During three seasons in the league, the Elites won the city's playoffs championship in 1928, and were playoffs finalists in 1927 and 1929.

For five seasons from 1929 to 1933, Potter managed the Edmonton Poolers while Barney Stanley coached the team. Their team included future National Hockey League (NHL) players Mac Colville, Neil Colville, Louis Trudel and Art Wiebe; and won the juvenile age group championship for minor ice hockey in Alberta in 1930.

Potter remained involved as the director for the midget and juvenile age groups in Edmonton, and served continuously in the role until the 1942–43 season. The age groups played all of their games on outdoor ice rinks, had grown to exceed 200 players by 1941, and Potter hoped to further expand the groups be encouraging participation from the towns surrounding Edmonton.

Potter was elected vice-president of the Edmonton and District Hockey Association (EDHA) in October 1943, then served as its president for four seasons beginning in October 1944. The EDHA grew to include teams from Red Deer in junior hockey, and expanded its minor hockey program to include a bantam age group. Potter and the EDHA sought to have a greater influence on hockey in Alberta, and perceived a lack of organization of hockey in Southern Alberta due to the failure to meet deadlines for provincial playoffs.

Potter was named a director of the Edmonton Junior Hockey League for the 1945–46 season. He and fellow league executives hired local baseball executive John Ducey as a public relations director to promote junior hockey when senior ice hockey was growing in Edmonton. The junior league suspended operations after the season, and the EDHA established a new city league including a combination of senior, intermediate and junior hockey teams.

Potter sat on a committee to establish a sports and recreation council for Edmonton, and felt the proposed body should aim to support and promote sports organizations rather than be simply a neutral administration. The council supported a proposal for a C$100,000 artificial ice rink for minor ice hockey, and Potter sat on the committee to have the facility designed and built. He retired as EDHA president in September 1948 to focus on organizing hockey at the provincial level.

== Alberta Amateur Hockey Association ==
=== Vice-president ===
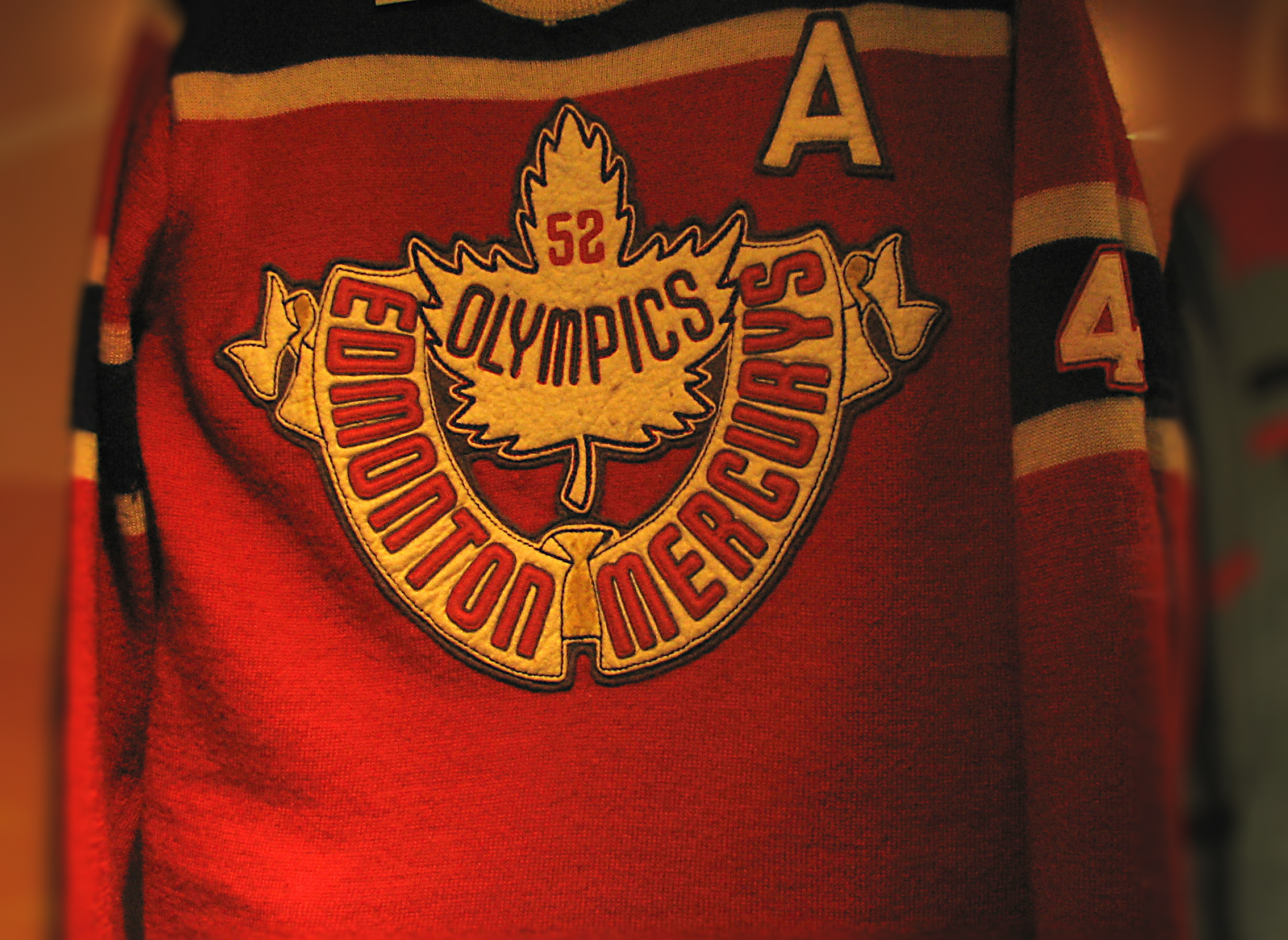
Edmonton Mercurys jersey at the 1952 Winter Olympics

Potter was elected vice-president of the Alberta Amateur Hockey Association (AAHA) in May 1948. He served seven one-year terms until 1955; and oversaw the Northern Alberta playoffs each season for intermediate level senior hockey, and the bantam, midget, juvenile age groups in minor hockey. The AAHA sought to increase registration in minor hockey and began paying the travel costs for teams during provincial playoffs, and reached its greatest number of players registered by the 1952–53 season.

At the 1949 general meeting, the AAHA contemplated combining the best players from the Edmonton Junior Hockey League into a Western Canada Junior Hockey League (WCJHL) team. An Edmonton team was formed for the 1950–51 season, but was denied entry since the WCJHL had already made its schedule. In response, the AAHA threatened not to sanction the other four Alberta-based teams in the league, but recanted and sought exhibition games for the Edmonton team. When players from Edmonton were added to the rosters of WCJHL teams, Potter stated that the players had not been released and faced suspension for not honouring commitments. After the players returned, Potter announced the team would be known as the Edmonton Oil Kings and play an exhibition schedule versus WCJHL teams.

Potter led initiatives to organize the Northern Alberta Intermediate Hockey League in 1948, and became secretary of the Western Canada intermediate hockey committee to organize inter-provincial playoffs. Intermediate hockey teams in Alberta included the Edmonton Mercurys who won the 1950 Ice Hockey World Championships, and the Lethbridge Maple Leafs who won the 1951 Ice Hockey World Championships. Potter chaired the committee that organized the victory parade in Edmonton for the Mercurys. Alberta had been without top-tier senior hockey since 1950, after its two Western Canada Senior Hockey League teams joined the Alexander Cup Major Series, then became professional. Potter blamed the increase of minor league professional hockey for the decline the senior hockey in Alberta. In October 1951, he and the AAHA upgraded the intermediate teams to A-level and B-level senior teams, which allowed the A-level teams to compete in the national Allan Cup playoffs.

=== President ===
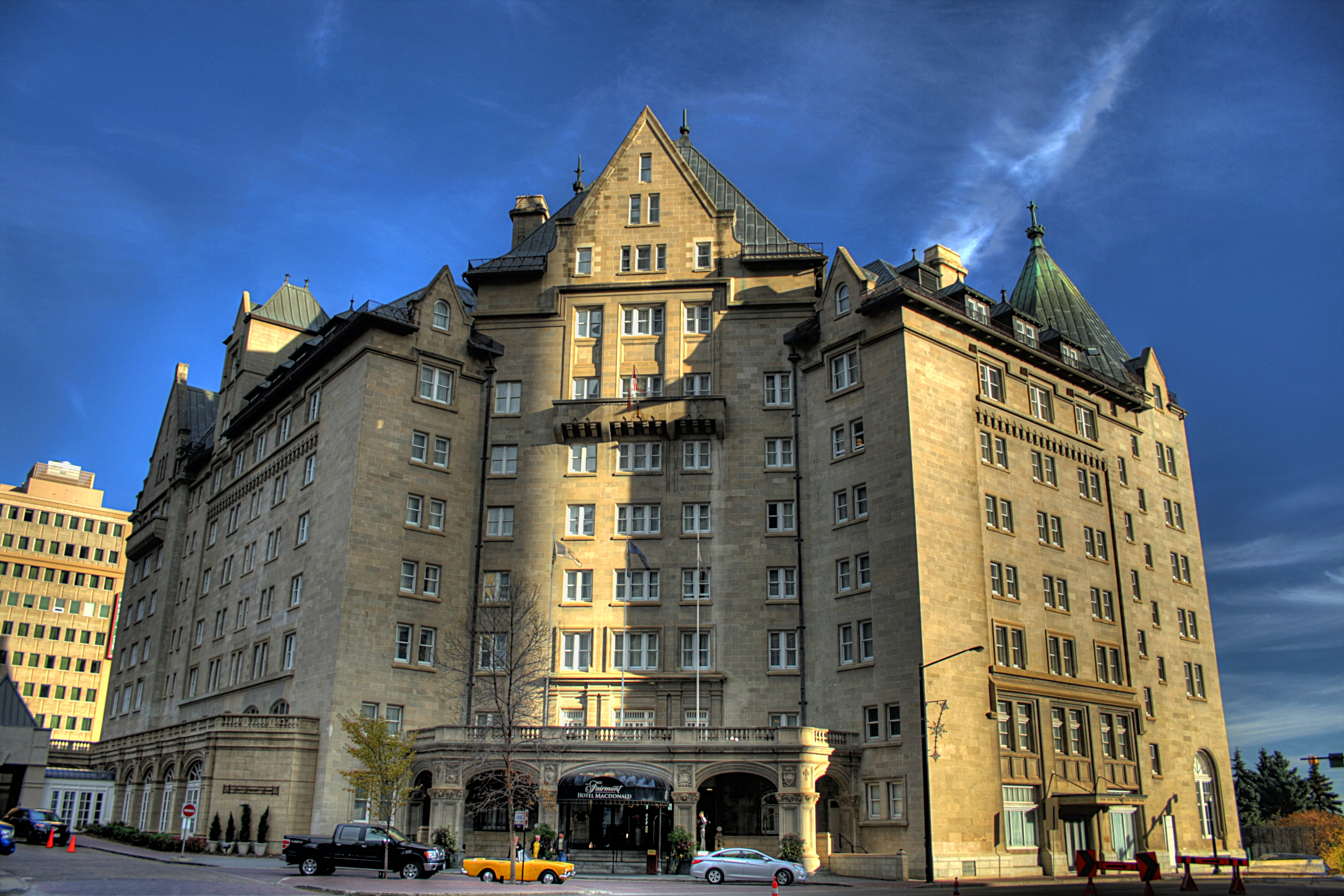
Potter oversaw hosting of the 1957 Canadian Amateur Hockey Association general meeting at the Hotel Macdonald in Edmonton.

Potter was elected president of the AAHA on November 14, 1955. and served four seasons in the position. He wanted to see more children playing the game for fun, advocated for shorter schedules, and felt that the game in general had become too physical. He wanted to see more temporary outdoor ice rinks constructed to meet the seasonal demands of minor hockey and recommended that rinks be located at schools if public parks had no available space.

Potter felt that "professional money [had] ruined amateur hockey", and that the NHL changed the game into a big business. He wanted to spread out junior hockey talent and see fewer players controlled by professional interests concentrated on a small group of teams. He also urged for smaller towns to focus on producing their own talent through minor hockey, instead of trying to import better players by offering money.

Potter aired several grievances of the AAHA at the 1956 Canadian Amateur Hockey Association (CAHA) general meeting. He was opposed to the NHL making professionals out of players who were still eligible for junior ice hockey. He argued that the loss of best players in Western Canada exacerbated the imbalance of Memorial Cup competition against stronger Eastern Canada teams, and that fewer talented players led to decreased attendance and ticket revenues in Alberta.

In September 1956, Bill Hunter claimed that he could rightfully sell players as the owner of the Medicine Hat Tigers. Potter disagreed that any junior team owned its players, nor had the right to sell them to another team, and compared it to slavery. He warned that proper transfers must be completed to change teams, and that players could be suspended if an agreement was not honoured to play for a team. He was also opposed to any amateur sport club which attempted to restrict its athletes from playing an additional amateur sport. He stated that the athlete had the right to choose, and would be supported by the AAHA and the CAHA.

Alberta was without any senior hockey level teams in 1956. The AAHA then divided its intermediate hockey level into tiers to allow for the inclusion of teams from smaller towns and leagues composed entirely of industrial employees. In August 1957, Potter appealed to the CAHA that Allan Cup competition be opened up to intermediate level teams strengthened by additional players. He wanted to see more branches of the CAHA to enter teams, rather than only the senior teams in Ontario in British Columbia. As of the 1958 Allan Cup, the CAHA allowed intermediate level teams outside of Ontario in British Columbia to add six players to their rosters to enter the national playoffs.

Potter stepped down as president in November 1958, and had continuously served on the AAHA executive from 1943 to 1959 as either a director, the vice-president or the president.

== Canadian Amateur Hockey Association ==
=== Vice-president ===
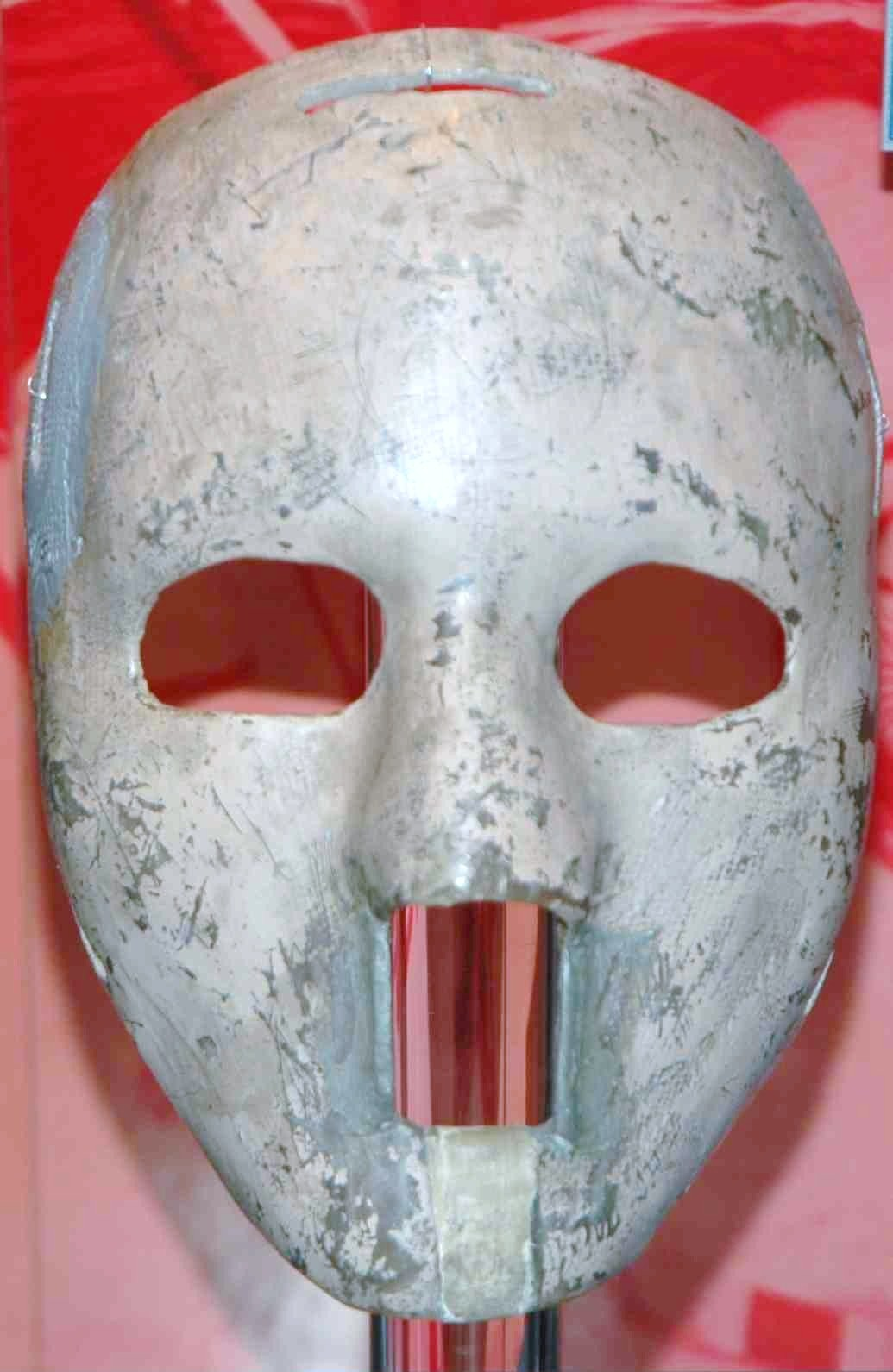
A goaltender mask used by Jacques Plante in 1959

Potter was elected second vice-president of the CAHA on May 21, 1959. He oversaw the distribution of $80,000 in grants towards development of minor hockey in Canada, and the implementation of mandatory goaltender masks. In January and February 1960, he chaperoned the Soviet Union men's national ice hockey team on their tour of Western Canada. He credited the team for being able to beat Canada in hockey and described the players as, "smart, clean-living and interested in finding out more about Canada". He oversaw scheduling for the 1960 Allan Cup in Western Canada, ruled that Saskatchewan too late in declaring a champion to participate in the playoffs, then changed his mind and scheduled an abbreviated series.

Potter was elected first vice-president in May 1960, and served two one-year terms. He was in change of the 1961 Memorial Cup playoffs in Western Canada and the final championship series. During the Western Canada final between the Winnipeg Rangers and the Edmonton Oil Kings, Potter assessed 10-minute misconduct penalties to five players and ordered them to begin the third game of the series in the penalty box. The Winnipeg Free Press described the decision as "an unusual scene" and that it had resulted from an on-ice stick-swinging brawl during game two of the series. He scheduled the championship series at the Edmonton Gardens, which became the first time that Edmonton hosted the Memorial Cup finals.

Potter served as chairman of the resolutions committee which handled recommendations to update the ice hockey rules and CAHA by-laws. The CAHA chose consistent usage of a three-man officiating system including a referee and two linesmen for inter-provincial playoffs, instead of each branch choosing its preferred system. Potter favoured the change and felt that junior hockey had become too fast for the two-referee system without linesmen.

The CAHA agreed that the reigning Allan Cup champion was the best choice to represent Canada in international hockey, but debated future participation due to financial struggles and the perceived lack of co-operation from ice hockey promoters in accessing profits from European tours. Potter attended the 1962 Ice Hockey World Championships in Colorado where Canada placed a disappointing second, which led to calls for a new method of selecting the national team.

=== President ===
==== First term ====
===== Domestic hockey =====
The Memorial Cup trophy

Potter was elected president of the CAHA to succeed Jack Roxburgh on May 25, 1962. Potter and the CAHA introduced the magazine Hockey Canada in September 1962, to be published about amateur hockey in Canada, and made available by subscription to all registered players and organizations. Potter denied reports in The Canadian Press that Quebec hockey officials were upset about increased fees and a decrease in minor hockey registrations. The Edmonton Journal later reported that minor hockey groups in Alberta were opposed to the magazine and it being touted as a mandatory fee. The CAHA ended publication of Hockey Canada after nine issues, due to fewer than expected subscriptions and multiple branches complaining about the added costs.

In November 1962, the CAHA sought funding from the Government of Canada via the National Advisory Council of Physical Fitness and Amateur Sports, to establish a national training program for coaches and managers who volunteered for an amateur hockey team. Potter felt university instructors would be best suited for training volunteers on how to teach hockey fundamentals to minor hockey players, and that the government would contribute since hockey aligned with the council's objectives of promoting citizenship, character and physical fitness.

Saskatchewan Junior Hockey League (SJHL) commissioner Frank Boucher proposed to establish a junior hockey league of the best twelve teams in Canada sponsored by the NHL, and to compete for a trophy at a higher tier than the Memorial Cup. Potter and the CAHA resolutions committee were against increasing NHL influence into amateur hockey in Canada and declined to present the proposal at the semi-annual meeting. Potter also wanted more study into programs to support continued junior hockey growth and the Memorial Cup. Boucher and team owners in Saskatchewan and Manitoba accused Potter and the CAHA of disregarding their concerns and favouring the Edmonton Oil Kings. Boucher threatened to withdraw the SJHL from the Memorial Cup playoffs, due to the "unfair domination of western junior hockey by the Edmonton Oil Kings", since they had the pick of all the players from Alberta and used loopholes in rules to import stronger players.

After a playoffs game between the Edmonton Oil Kings and the Estevan Bruins in April 1963, Potter announced that broadcast rights for CAHA games by Ken Newmans of CHAB in Moose Jaw, and Linus Westerbeg of CKOS-TV in Yorkton, had been indefinitely suspended. Potter stated that the suspensions resulted from "continuously and severely criticizing officials, thereby giving an erroneous picture of the game as played"; and that "this type of broadcast is a definite detriment to sport and cannot be tolerated". The Canadian Press argued the need for a full-time position within the CAHA to oversee on-ice officiating, charged Potter of censorship and going beyond his power, and expressed concerns that sportscasters can decrease interest in a sport due to their criticism. Potter lifted the ban on the two broadcasters after the conclusion of the playoffs.

Potter oversaw the 1963 Memorial Cup between the Edmonton Oil Kings and the Niagara Falls Flyers, played at the Edmonton Gardens. Niagara Falls' coach Hap Emms made numerous petty complaints about the series and the CAHA, including the ice rink's dimensions and access to the other team's practices. Emms threatened that the Flyers would quit the 1963 Memorial Cup and accused Potter of being "strictly a homer" and dictatorial. Emms charged that his team was denied access to treatment for a player's broken leg, and that spectators and sportswriters in Edmonton treated his team poorly, and complained about a general lack of hospitality. Potter dismissed the charges and stated that the treatment of the Flyers matched their lack of courtesy and refusal to attend the Edmonton Sports Writers' Association dinner. The Canadian Press described the series as an "all-out war", the play of Edmonton to be "almost brutal", and that Edmonton seemed intent to end Eastern Canada's opinion that Western Canadian teams played "pantsy-waist hockey". After Edmonton won the 1963 Memorial Cup in six games, the CAHA debated the incidents in the series and approved a motion to deplore "the actions of any club official which degrade our game". Potter agreed that Emms was a good coach but that "his actions were childlike".

===== International hockey =====
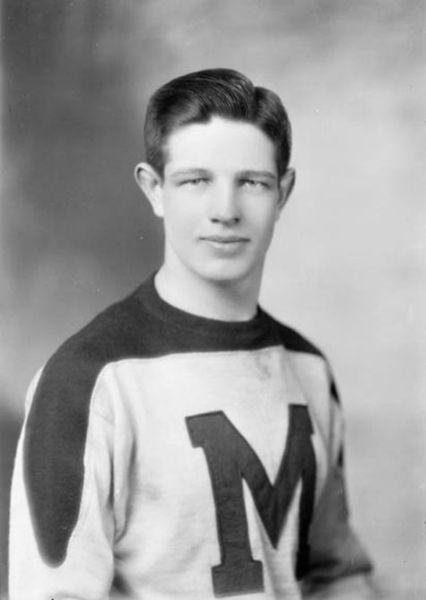
David Bauer

The CAHA general meeting in 1962 debated alternate methods of selecting the Canada men's national ice hockey team instead of sending the reigning Allan Cup champion to international events. The AAHA submitted a proposal for the Canadian Army to train the athletes and operate the team. The Thunder Bay Amateur Hockey Association suggested each CAHA branch send its best players to an all-star playoffs series to select a team. Two former CAHA presidents offered different views on Canada's amateur eligibility at the next Olympics. Jack Roxburgh recommended not attending since he felt that Canada's practice of allowing financial compensation to amateurs for salary loss was against the Olympic Oath; whereas Robert Lebel argued that Canada did not violate the Olympic Oath since the International Ice Hockey Federation (IIHF) permitted an allowance. The CAHA chose to participate in ice hockey at the 1964 Winter Olympics, and Potter deferred making the decision on which team would be sent until the next executive meeting.

Potter met with the CAHA executive in August 1962, when Father David Bauer presented his concept for a truly amateur team at the Olympics. The CAHA approved Bauer's plan to establish a team of student athletes who would train and study at the University of British Columbia, and be supplemented by seniors players for the Olympics. After the decision was announced, Potter denied misconceptions by University of Alberta physical education director Maury Van Vliet that all national team members would be students or that the team would participate in a Canadian Interuniversity Athletic Union hockey league. Potter later met with Bauer and University of British Columbia officials and reached a financial agreement for the national team program to begin in August 1963.

Potter commented on the Soviet Union national team tour of Canada in 1962, and felt that despite losses to them, Canada would regain its position as the world's top hockey nation since it produced the best players. He felt that as a part of Canada teaching hockey to the world, pupils could become better than the teacher. He noted that the Europeans played with a lot of passing the way Canada used to, and taking high-sticking penalties was Canada's weakness in international play.

The Trail Smoke Eaters won the 1962 Allan Cup and were chosen to represent Canada at the 1963 Ice Hockey World Championships. When the Western International Hockey League did not operate during the 1962–63 season, the team appealed for exhibition games in preparation for the World Championships. Potter and the CAHA noted that reports of the Smoke Eaters asking for money had not come from team executives, and that the CAHA had not planned for the team to be in financial difficulty.

In March 1963, the IIHF threatened to withdraw ice hockey from the 1964 Winter Olympics due to disagreements with the International Olympic Committee (IOC). Potter felt that hockey should participate despite concerns about the financial arrangements for television broadcast rights. The Canadian Press speculated that Potter's remarks reflected that Canada wanted to remain on good terms with the IOC since it had bid to host the 1968 Winter Olympics in Calgary.

Journalist Mordecai Richler reported that the Canada national team was given second class hotel accommodations and cold pork chops for breakfast at the 1963 Ice Hockey World Championships in Sweden, and that Swedish newspaper headlines stated that "The Canadians want to see blood". Richler quoted Potter as saying, "These are Cold War tactics to demoralize the Canadian team. They always stab us in the back here".

Canada placed fourth at the 1963 World Championships, its worst result at the time. Potter stated, "Something has to be done to stimulate more national hockey pride in Canada". He felt that Canada would not win the World Championships again unless it sent its best players and gave them enough time to develop as a team. The CAHA and the Smoke Eaters disagreed on the team's financial statement of the European tour, and coach Bobby Kromm faulted the CAHA for lack of financial assistance and additional players to strengthen the team. Potter felt that the CAHA had done nothing wrong and accused Kromm of poor judgment in choosing players. The team perceived Potter's statement as censuring the coach and was criticized as "unfair and unsportsmanlike".

==== Second term ====
===== Domestic hockey =====
The Allan Cup trophy

Potter was re-elected president on May 24, 1963. He welcomed reports that the Edmonton Flyers and the Calgary Stampeders would withdraw from the professional minor league hockey. He felt that since the NHL could no longer claim territorial rights without professional teams in Alberta, it would stimulate NHL sponsorship of junior teams instead. The CAHA debated a proposal to end the direct NHL sponsorship of junior teams and replace it with a universal draft of players who had graduated from the junior hockey level. The NHL did not want to abandon the sponsorship system since it was unknown what would replace it, and favoured to keep the structure of the NHL Amateur Draft for a few years before considering another system. The CAHA continued to seek for all players eligible for the draft and not just 16-year-olds.

Potter oversaw scheduling for the 1964 Memorial Cup played in Toronto, and disagreed with the management of Maple Leaf Gardens on the radio broadcast rights for games. The Gardens' management demanded more money from the stations and refused entry to some broadcasters. Potter stated that the CAHA reserved all rights, but that there was little he could do since the CAHA had a different contract with the Gardens. After the Toronto Marlboros won the series in four games, Potter said it was a financial failure since Gardens' management priced the tickets too high. He recommended that future Memorial Cup finals alternate between the arenas of the participating teams, and that playoffs be shortened for the final to be played in April rather than in May.

In May 1964, the CAHA decided to allow teams based in the United States to compete for the Allan Cup if they participated in a Canadian-based senior league, after the British Columbia Amateur Hockey Association and the Thunder Bay Amateur Hockey Association argued in favour of including the Spokane Jets and the Warroad Lakers. Potter declined to answer whether an American-based team could win the Allan Cup and represent Canada at international events, and felt that the formation of a permanent national team was preferred.

===== International hockey =====
Potter was named to the North American committee of the IIHF in August 1963. He presented differences in international body checking rules at the IIHF general meeting in 1963, where the federation agreed to trial usage of the North American rules to see if European players and spectators would accept a permanent change. The Canada national team played a European exhibition tour in preparation for the Olympics. Potter questioned whether future exhibition games in Czechoslovakia or the Soviet Union would be worthwhile, due to the games being used for political propaganda and to give Canada a bad reputation. Potter accused media in Czechoslovakia and the Soviet Union for portraying Canada as physical and undisciplined, whereas newspapers in Germany and Switzerland lauded Canada's play as clean and disciplined.

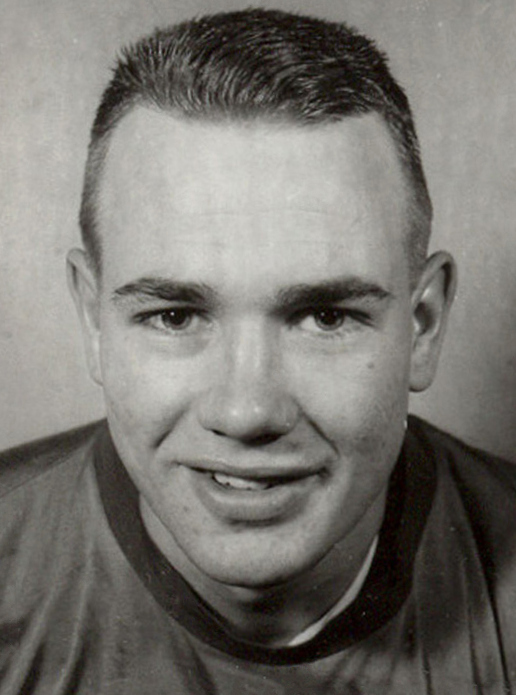
Carl-Göran Öberg

Potter accused referees at the Olympics of calling petty penalties and ruining the games for all countries, and credited Bauer for keeping his cool despite the inept officiating. Potter felt that Canada should not participate in future international competitions unless four North American referees were used. During a game versus the Sweden national team, Bauer was struck in the face with a broken hockey stick thrown aside by Carl-Göran Öberg. Potter felt the Swedish player should have been assessed a 10-minute penalty and a game misconduct, and implied that it was typical behaviour by the Sweden national team.

Canada, Sweden and Czechoslovakia completed the Olympic tournament with similar records of five wins and two losses. Canada believed it had won the bronze medal, but the IIHF placed Canada fourth overall. Potter appealed the decision and contested that only the games involving the top four teams mattered when using goals for and against in tie-breaking, instead of including all games in the tournament. The IIHF held a meeting to confirm its interpretation of the tie-breaking procedure and denied the appeal. IIHF president Bunny Ahearne stated that Canada misunderstood the rules and how the standings were calculated.

The Canada national team did not attend the medal ceremonies. Potter, Bauer and the team trainer were the only three Canadians present. Potter was quoted in The Canadian Press by an unnamed source as saying that Canada would never play in the Olympics again. He admitted that he might have said it out of frustration, but later denied the quote and still felt that Canada had been double-crossed in the standings.

Potter felt that the system used by Bauer to select a national team "may sow the seed for something", and that "it could well be the pattern we adopt in the future". Potter lauded the hockey players at the 1964 Olympics for conducting themselves as true sportsmen in Europe, and had "captured the imagination of people everywhere". He recognized that the time commitment to the national team had a negative academic impact on its players, and commended them for paying the price to represent the country without complaining. Potter met with Bauer to discuss prevention of academic impacts, after it was revealed that seven of the players dropped out of their courses, and nine others completed less than half of their courses.

The 1964 CAHA general meeting debated the future of the national team. Potter defended Bauer's system and disagreed with suggestions to use junior-aged players who he felt were not mature enough to play at the international level. He felt that the talent level on the national team had to be on par with the American Hockey League to regain the World Championship, and that sending the reigning Allan Cup champion was no longer the answer. He advocated using the nucleus of the 1964 Olympics team and adding senior players until it became a truly national team by the 1968 Winter Olympics. The CAHA chose the 1964 Allan Cup champions Winnipeg Maroons to form the nucleus of a national team, then add the best available players from across Canada. The Maroons gave up their identity and became the permanent Canada national team.

=== Past president ===
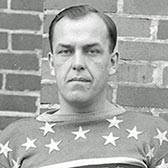
Hap Emms

Potter was succeeded by Lionel Fleury of Quebec City as president on May 23, 1964. Potter was named chairman of a committee for an internal audit of the finances of the CAHA branches and their affiliated groups. He also chaired a committee to examine the professional-amateur agreement with the NHL, with the intent to keep players in junior hockey as long as possible instead of becoming professionals. The CAHA continued to seek an end to the NHL sponsoring of a small number of junior teams and to spread out the financial support more evenly across Canada.

Alberta welcomed the return of senior hockey in 1964, to replace the void left by the departed Western Hockey League teams. Potter cautioned teams to avoid a financial bidding war for players, which had caused the previous decline of senior hockey in Alberta. He felt that the Allan Cup would regain its prestige within a year or two if teams kept expenses low and minimized travel costs to share the wealth.

The CAHA submitted a bid to host the top tier of the 1967 Ice Hockey World Championships to coincide with the Canadian Centennial. Potter advised to host only the top tier of competition which would generate the most ticket sales and felt that the IIHF would be willing to host the lower tiers of competition elsewhere. In March 1965, the IIHF declined the CAHA's bid in favour of hosting all tiers of the 1967 World Championships in Austria. Potter questioned whether it was worthwhile for the CAHA to participate in future World Championships if its relationship with the IIHF could not improve and be financially sustainable.

Potter oversaw the 1965 Memorial Cup played at the Edmonton Gardens, a rematch of the final between the Edmonton Oil Kings and the Niagara Falls Flyers. The 1965 series was also physical in mature and included further disagreements between Potter and Hap Emms. During game three of the series, Niagara Falls' Derek Sanderson attacked Edmonton's Bob Falkenberg which resulted in a bench-clearing brawl. Potter ordered that the game be stopped after three match penalties, nine major penalties and three misconducts had been issued; and after Edmonton police had to restore order when fans became involved with players. Potter described the brawl as "butchery" and the most brutal he had seen. Both teams made threats not to continue and Potter recommended that the series be called off. After multiple suspensions and an increased police presence, the series continued and Niagara Falls won in five games. Emms made multiple complaints about the scheduling and inferred that Potter had a financial benefit from games at the Edmonton Gardens. Potter implied that Emms felt he knew everything, and declined the "cloak of genius" label given to him by Emms.

Potter and Ontario Hockey Association president Matt Leyden spoke at the 1965 Memorial Cup banquet and gave similar views on the state of minor hockey in Canada. Both men noted the booming growth in participation in the game, but that boys lost interest in their late teenage years after having played organized hockey for 10 years. Potter felt that the Alberta Junior Hockey League established in 1964 had improved the situation and retained players in Alberta.

Potter felt that the CAHA general meeting in May 1966 would be one of its most important meetings, since the CAHA had submitted notice to terminate the professional-amateur agreement with the NHL due to grievances with the drafting of 17-year-olds and the uneven distribution of money. A new agreement was announced at the meeting, and Potter believed it meant that more players would stay in junior hockey as a result of changes to the NHL Amateur Draft and a new system of distributing funds. At the same meeting, he was named chairman of the CAHA rules committee. He felt that the new practice of alternating referees in Memorial Cup and Allan Cup games caused fewer complaints, and sought for rules that sanctioned teams who abused referees.

Potter oversaw the Western Canada playoffs for the 1966 Allan Cup in addition to the finals played at the Stampede Corral in Calgary, and instructed referees to clamp down on rough play. The Drumheller Miners from Alberta won the championship series in six games, and Potter travelled with them to the 1967 Ahearne Cup tournament in Sweden. Drumheller finished in last place at the tournament, and lost by a 3–1 score to the Swedish team in a game that nearly resulted in an on-ice brawl. Potter felt that the officiating at the tournament was disgraceful and a deliberate attempt to prevent Drumheller from winning, and had authorized the team to protest the officiating and withdraw from a game in progress.

== Personal life ==
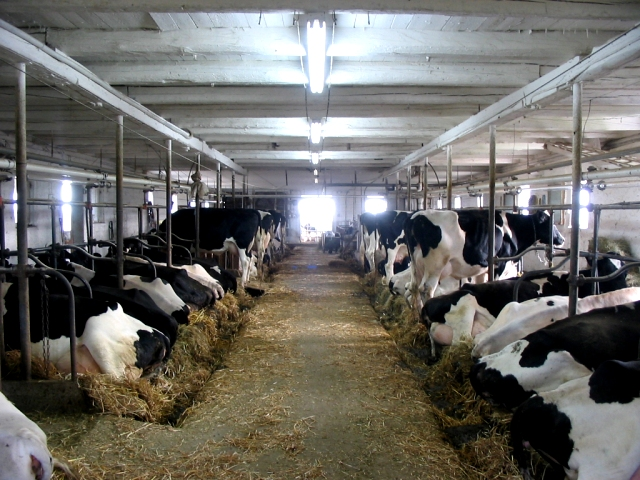
Dairy cattle on a farm in Canada

Potter was a lifelong Edmonton resident from the time he was nine months old. He worked as a salesman for Chevrolet automobiles at Edmonton Motors during the early 1930s. He later worked as a manager and supervisor at the Northern Alberta Dairy Pool from 1933 onwards, and promoted the agricultural cooperative model for dairy farming in Canada.

He was married to Shirley Potter for 65 years, with whom he had two daughters and one son. She was a costume designer for the Edmonton Opera and the Alberta Ballet Company, and operated her own business known as Shirley Potter Costumes. The Potters were members of the Anglican Church of Canada and met at the Anglican Young People's Association in 1931. He served as president of the central council in Edmonton for the Anglican Young People's Association during the early 1930s.

Potter was the secretary of the Edmonton Sportsmen's Association during the 1950s, the local sports boosterism club. He sat on the association's Grey Cup entertainment committee for the supporters of the Edmonton Eskimos. He chaired the committee for the welcome home party after the team's victory at the 43rd Grey Cup in 1955. He was later an executive member of the Sportsmen's Fund to boost local amateur sports, and was chairman of Edmonton Sports Hall of Fame committee when it was established in 1959, and inducted its first members in 1960.

Potter was elected to four terms as chairman of the Edmonton Recreation Board from 1958 to 1961. The board advised the Edmonton City Council on recreational facility rentals and fees, and future services. Potter and the board assisted in the planning and construction of the South Edmonton Sports Centre which opened in October 1961, with the aimed to support and grow minor ice hockey in Edmonton.

In a 1954 interview, Potter stated that his years of volunteer work were for the love of the game and the enjoyment of watching the kids play. He summarized the most common complaints he received into three categories; the quality of the referee, the validity of player registrations, and the location of playoffs games. He noted that the weather was the greatest issue during the playoffs. At a meeting of the Alberta Recreation Association in 1959, he urged for more people to become involved in sporting activities, and stated that "recreation is a part of life right from the cradle to the grave".

Potter was also a Freemason and a member of West Edmonton Lodge Number 101. He died in Edmonton on January 19, 1998.

== Honours and legacy ==
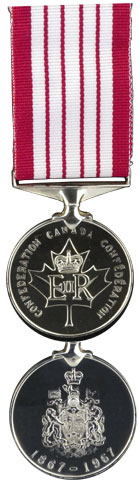
Canadian Centennial Medal

Potter was described by the Edmonton Journal as a "hands-on administrator even at the risk of frostbite"; and that even in −30 °C (−22 °F) temperatures, he "tried to attend every game, standing at the edge of the rink in the snowbank". He was known as "Mr. Hockey" in Edmonton, and was inducted into the Edmonton Sports Hall of Fame in 1970. He was the namesake of the Art Potter Trophy awarded to the most valuable player of the annual all-star game between the juvenile and junior age groups in Edmonton, and was made an honorary life member of Edmonton's Maple Leaf Athletic Club in 1981.

The AAHA honoured Potter and all of its living past presidents with bronze lapel pins at the general meeting in October 1962, and was made a life member in November 1964. Potter was inducted into the builder category in Alberta Sports Hall of Fame in November 1968, and was part of the inaugural class of four inductees into the Alberta Hockey Hall of Fame in 1982.

Potter received the Amateur Hockey Association of the United States citation award in 1965, for contributions to the game in the United States. He was recognized for services to amateur hockey in Canada with the CAHA Order of Merit in May 1966, and received the Canadian Centennial Medal in 1967. He received the past-president's pin from the CAHA in 1973, and was made a life member in May 1976.

== Sources ==
- Oliver, Greg (2017). Father Bauer and the Great Experiment: The Genesis of Canadian Olympic Hockey. Toronto, Ontario: ECW Press. ISBN 978-1-77041-249-1.
- Lapp, Richard M.; Macaulay, Alec (1997). The Memorial Cup: Canada's National Junior Hockey Championship. Madeira Park, British Columbia: Harbour Publishing. ISBN 1-55017-170-4.
- McKinley, Michael (2014). It's Our Game: Celebrating 100 Years Of Hockey Canada. Toronto, Ontario: Viking Press. ISBN 978-0-670-06817-3.
- Constitution, By-laws, Regulations, History. Gloucester, Ontario: Canadian Amateur Hockey Association. May 1990.
