= 1960 Allan Cup =

Canadian senior ice hockey championship

The Allan Cup trophy

The 1960 Allan Cup was the Canadian senior ice hockey championship for the 1959–60 senior "A" season. The event was hosted by the Trail Smoke Eaters and Trail, British Columbia. The 1960 playoff marked the 52nd time that the Allan Cup has been awarded.

== Teams ==
- Chatham Maroons (Eastern Canadian Champions)
- Trail Smoke Eaters (Western Canadian Champions)

== Playdowns ==
=== Allan Cup Best-of-Seven Series ===
Chatham Maroons 4 - Trail Smoke Eaters 1
Chatham Maroons 5 - Trail Smoke Eaters 5 (OTF)
Chatham Maroons 7 - Trail Smoke Eaters 4
Chatham Maroons 2 - Trail Smoke Eaters 1
Chatham Maroons 5 - Trail Smoke Eaters 4

=== Eastern Playdowns ===
Quarter-final

Amherst Ramblers defeated Montreal Meuniers 3-games-to-none with 1 tie

Amherst Ramblers 2 - Montreal Meuniers 2
Amherst Ramblers 4 - Montreal Meuniers 3
Amherst Ramblers 4 - Montreal Meuniers 1
Amherst Ramblers 10 - Montreal Meuniers 0

Semi-final

Chatham Maroons defeated Rouyn-Noranda Alouettes 3-games-to-2

Rouyn-Noranda Alouettes 3 - Chatham Maroons 2
Rouyn-Noranda Alouettes 10 - Chatham Maroons 2
Chatham Maroons 7 - Rouyn-Noranda Alouettes 0
Chatham Maroons 3 - Rouyn-Noranda Alouettes 2
Chatham Maroons 5 - Rouyn-Noranda Alouettes 0

Hull Legion defeated Amherst Ramblers 3-games-to-2

Amherst Ramblers 8 - Hull Legion 2
Amherst Ramblers 8 - Hull Legion 7
Hull Legion 5 - Amherst Ramblers 4
Hull Legion 5 - Amherst Ramblers 2
Hull Legion 2 - Amherst Ramblers 1

Final

Chatham Maroons defeated Hull Legion 3-games-to-1

Chatham Maroons 6 - Hull Legion 2
Chatham Maroons 6 - Hull Legion 2
Hull Legion 6 - Chatham Maroons 4
Chatham Maroons 19 - Hull Legion 0

=== Western Playdowns ===
Canadian Amateur Hockey Association second vice-president Art Potter oversaw scheduling in Western Canada, ruled that Saskatchewan too late in declaring a champion to participate in the playoffs, then changed his mind and scheduled an abbreviated series.

Quarter-final

Saskatoon Quakers defeated Winnipeg Maroons 2-games-to-1

Saskatoon Quakers 3 - Winnipeg Maroons 1
Winnipeg Maroons 3 - Saskatoon Quakers 2
Saskatoon Quakers 2 - Winnipeg Maroons 1

Semi-final

Port Arthur Bearcats defeated Saskatoon Quakers 3-games-to-none

Port Arthur Bearcats 5 - Saskatoon Quakers 2
Port Arthur Bearcats 4 - Saskatoon Quakers 3
Port Arthur Bearcats 5 - Saskatoon Quakers 2

Final

Trail Smoke Eaters defeated Port Arthur Bearcats 4-games-to-none

Trail Smoke Eaters 6 - Port Arthur Bearcats 0
Trail Smoke Eaters 4 - Port Arthur Bearcats 1
Trail Smoke Eaters 5 - Port Arthur Bearcats 2
Trail Smoke Eaters 7 - Port Arthur Bearcats 1
