= 1939 Ice Hockey World Championships =

1939 edition of the World Ice Hockey Championships

Tournament details
- Host country: Switzerland
- Venues: 2 (in 2 host cities)
- Dates: 3–12 February; 5 March
- Teams: 14

Final positions
- Champions: Canada (11th title)
- Runners-up: United States
- Third place: Switzerland
- Fourth place: Czechoslovakia

Tournament statistics
- Games played: 48
- Goals scored: 267 (5.56 per game)
- Attendance: 299,600 (6,242 per game)
- Scoring leader(s): (Czechoslovakia) Josef Maleček, (Switzerland) Pic Cattini 12 goals

The 1939 Ice Hockey World Championships were held between February 3 and February 12, 1939, in Zürich and Basel, Switzerland. Austria had been annexed by Germany in 1938, and four Austrians played this tournament in German jerseys. The fourteen teams participating in the 1939 World Championship were initially divided into four preliminary groups: two groups of four and two groups of three. The top two teams in each group advanced to the second round. The eight teams in the second round played in two groups of four, with the top two from each group advancing to the third (final) round. The six teams not advancing to the second round played a consolation round in two groups of 3 teams with the winners of each group playing a one-game play-off for 9th place. The four teams not advancing from the second round played a consolation round for placed 5 through 8.

Canada won its eleventh world championship winning all their games while only giving up one goal in the entire tournament. The USA had lost to the Swiss in the semi-final round, but defeated them in the final to claim silver. The host, Switzerland, won its third European championship by winning a one-game playoff against Czechoslovakia well after the World Championship had concluded. Both teams had earned one point in the final round and decided to play tie-breaking game.

The games were held at Kunsteisbahn Margarethen in Basel and Dolder Kunsteisbahn in Zürich.

The 8-1 victory over the Belgian side would be the last victory for Hungary at the World Championships highest level until 2016

== World Ice Hockey Championship (in Basel and Zurich, Switzerland) ==
=== First round ===
==== Group A ====
3. February 1939	Basel	Germany	–	Finland	12:1 (2:0,7:1,3:0)
3. February 1939	Basel	USA	–	Italy	5:0 (3:0,1:0,1:0)
4. February 1939	Basel	Italy	–	Finland	5:2 (1:0,1:0,3:2)
4. February 1939	Basel	USA	–	Germany	4:0 (2:0,0:0,2:0)
5. February 1939	Basel	USA	–	Finland	4:0 (0:0,1:0,3:0)
5. February 1939	Basel	Germany	–	Italy	4:4 ET (0:1,2:3,2:0,0:0,0:0,0:0)

Standings

Pos.	Team	G.P.	Wins	Ties	Losses	Goals	Goal Diff	Pts.
1	USA	3	3	0	0	13: 0	+13	6:0
2	Germany	3	1	1	1	16: 9	+ 7	3:3
3	Italy	3	1	1	1	9:11	2	3:3
4	Finland	3	0	0	3	3:21	-18	0:6

- The Executive Board voted to have Italy and Germany replay their game (February 6 at Zurich), which ended as a scoreless draw, after which goal differential was used to decide second place.

==== Group B ====
3. February 1939	Basel	Czechoslovakia	–	Yugoslavia	24:0 (10:0,7:0,7:0)
3. February 1939	Zürich	Switzerland	–	Latvia	12:0 (5:0,3:0,4:0)
4. February 1939	Zürich	Switzerland	–	Yugoslavia	23:0 (7:0,7:0,9:0)
4. February 1939	Zürich	Czechoslovakia	–	Latvia	9:0 (3:0,3:0,3:0)
5. February 1939	Zürich	Latvia	–	Yugoslavia	6:0 (0:0,3:0,3:0)
5. February 1939	Zürich	Switzerland	–	Czechoslovakia	1:0 (0:0,1:0,0:0)

Standings

Pos.	Team	G.P.	Wins	Ties	Losses	Goals	Goal Diff	Pts.
1	Switzerland	3	3	0	0	36: 0	+36	6:0
2	Czechoslovakia	3	2	0	1	33: 1	+32	4:2
3	Latvia	3	1	0	2	6:21	-15	2:4
4	Yugoslavia	3	0	0	3	0:53	-53	0:6

==== Group C ====
3. February 1939	Basel	Canada	–	Netherlands	8:0 (1:0,4:0,3:0)
4. February 1939	Basel	Poland	–	Netherlands	9:0 (3:0,2:0,4:0)
5. February 1939	Basel	Canada	–	Poland	4:0 (2:0,1:0,1:0)

Standings

Pos.	Team	G.P.	Wins	Ties	Losses	Goals	Goal Diff	Pts.
1	Canada	2	2	0	0	12: 0	+12	4:0
2	Poland	2	1	0	1	9: 4	+ 5	2:2
3	Netherlands	2	0	0	2	0:17	-17	0:4

==== Group D ====
3. February 1939	Zürich	Hungary	–	Belgium	8:1 (2:0,4:1,2:0)
4. February 1939	Zürich	Great Britain	–	Belgium	3:1 (0:0,0:1,3:0)
5. February 1939	Zürich	Great Britain	–	Hungary	1:0 (1:0,0:0,0:0)

Standings

Pos.	Team	G.P.	Wins	Ties	Losses	Goals	Goal Diff	Pts.
1	Great Britain	2	2	0	0	4: 1	+3	4:0
2	Hungary	2	1	0	1	8: 2	+6	2:2
3	Belgium	2	0	0	2	2:11	-9	0:4

=== Consolation Round – Places 9 to 14 ===
==== Group A ====
6. February 1939	Basel	Netherlands	–	Finland	2:1 (1:1,1:0,0:0)
7. February 1939	Basel	Italy	–	Netherlands	2:1 (0:0,0:0,2:1)
8. February 1939	Basel	Italy	–	Finland	2:1 (0:0,1:1,1:0)

Standings

Pos.	Team	G.P.	Wins	Ties	Losses	Goals	Goal Diff	Pts.
1	Italy	2	2	0	0	4:2	+2	4:0
2	Netherlands	2	1	0	1	3:3	0	2:2
3	Finland	2	0	0	2	2:4	-2	0:4

==== Group B ====
6. February 1939	Zürich	Latvia	–	Belgium	5:1 (2:0,1:1,2:0)
7. February 1939	Zürich	Belgium	–	Yugoslavia	3:3 (2:1,1:0,0:2)
8. February 1939	Zürich	Latvia	–	Yugoslavia	4:0 (2:0,0:0,2:0)

Standings

Pos.	Team	G.P.	Wins	Ties	Losses	Goals	Goal Diff	Pts.
1	Latvia	2	2	0	0	9:1	+8	4:0
2	Belgium	2	0	1	1	4:8	-4	1:3
3	Yugoslavia	2	0	1	1	3:7	-4	1:3

==== Consolation round 9–10 Place ====
9. February 1939	Basel	Italy	–	Latvia	2:1 (1:1,1:0,0:0)

=== Second round ===
==== Group A ====
7. February 1939	Zürich	Czechoslovakia	–	Germany	1:1 ET (0:0,1:0,0:1,0:0,0:0,0:0)
7. February 1939	Zürich	Canada	–	Great Britain	4:0 (0:0,0:0,4:0)
8. February 1939	Zürich	Great Britain	–	Germany	0:1 (0:0,0:0,0:1)
8. February 1939	Basel	Canada	–	Czechoslovakia	2:1 (0:1,0:0,2:0)
9. February 1939	Basel	Great Britain	–	Czechoslovakia	0:2 (0:1,0:1,0:0)
9. February 1939	Zürich	Canada	–	Germany	9:0 (2:0,5:0,2:0)

Standings

Pos.	Team	G.P.	Wins	Ties	Losses	Goals	Goal Diff	Pts.
1	Canada	3	3	0	0	15: 1	+14	6:0
2	Czechoslovakia	3	1	1	1	4: 3	+1	3:3
3	Germany	3	1	1	1	2:10	8	3:3
4	Great Britain	3	0	0	3	0: 7	7	0:6

==== Group B ====
7. February 1939	Basel	USA	–	Hungary	3:0 (1:0,1:0,1:0)
7. February 1939	Basel	Switzerland	–	Poland	4:0 (0:0,4:0,0:0)
8. February 1939	Basel	Poland	–	Hungary	5:3 (1:1,2:0,2:2)
8. February 1939	Basel	Switzerland	–	USA	3:2 (0:0,2:2,1:0)
9. February 1939	Basel	USA	–	Poland	4:0 (0:0,2:0,2:0)
9. February 1939	Basel	Switzerland	–	Hungary	5:2 (2:1,2:0,1:1)

Standings

Pos.	Team	G.P.	Wins	Ties	Losses	Goals	Goal Diff	Pts.
1	Switzerland	3	3	0	0	12: 4	+8	6:0
2	USA	3	2	0	1	9: 3	+ 4	4:2
3	Poland	3	1	0	2	5:11	6	2:4
4	Hungary	3	0	0	3	5:13	8	0:6

=== Consolation Round -- Places 5 to 8 ===
10. February 1939	Basel	Poland	–	Hungary	3:0 (1:0,1:0,1:0)
11. February 1939	Zürich	Germany	–	Hungary	6:2 (0:2,3:0,3:0)
12. February 1939	Basel	Germany	–	Poland	4:0 (1:0,3:0,0:0)

Standings

Pos.	Team	G.P.	Wins	Ties	Losses	Goals	Goal Diff	Pts.
5	Germany	2	2	0	0	10: 2	+8	4:0
6	Poland	2	1	0	1	3: 4	-1	2:2
7	Hungary	2	0	0	2	2: 9	-7	0:4
8	Great Britain	0	0	0	0	0: 0	0	0:0

=== Final Round – Places 1 to 4 ===
10. February 1939	Zürich	USA	–	Czechoslovakia	1:0 ET (0:0,0:0,0:0,0:0,1:0)
10. February 1939	Basel	Switzerland	–	Canada	0:7 (0:2,0:4,0:1)
11. February 1939	Basel	Switzerland	–	USA	1:2 (0:1,0:0,1:1)
11. February 1939	Basel	Canada	–	Czechoslovakia	4:0 (0:0,1:0,3:0)
12. February 1939	Basel	Canada	–	USA	4:0 (3:0,1:0,0:0)
12. February 1939	Zürich	Switzerland	–	Czechoslovakia	0:0 ET (0:0,0:0,0:0,0:0,0:0,0:0)

Standings

Pos.	Team	G.P.	Wins	Ties	Losses	Goals	Goal Diff	Pts.
1	Canada	3	3	0	0	15: 0	+15	6:0
2	USA	3	2	0	1	3: 5	2	4:2
3	Switzerland	3	0	1	2	1: 9	8	1:5
4	Czechoslovakia	3	0	1	2	0: 5	5	1:5

=== Playoff for 3rd place (and European Championship) ===
5. March 1939	Basel	Switzerland	–	Czechoslovakia	2:0 (0:0,1:0,1:0)

=== Final Rankings – 1939 World Championships ===
Gold medal	Canada
Silver medal	United States
Bronze medal	Switzerland
4	Czechoslovakia
5	Germany
6	Poland
7	Hungary
8	Great Britain
9	Italy
10	Latvia
11	Belgium
11	Netherlands
13	Finland
13	Yugoslavia

World Champion 1939
Canada

==== Team Members ====
Trail Smoke Eaters

Pos.	Country	Members
1	CAN	Bunny Dame, Benny Hayes, Joe Benoit, Tom Johnston, Jim Haight, Mel Snowdon, Duke Scodellaro, Mickey Brennen, Dick Kowcinak, Ab Cronie, Jim Morris, John McCreedy, Buck Buchanan; Trainer: Elmer Piper

=== Final Rankings – 1939 European Championships ===
Gold medal	Switzerland
Silver medal	Czechoslovakia
Bronze medal	Germany
4	Poland
5	Hungary
6	Great Britain
7	Italy
8	Latvia
9	Belgium
9	Netherlands
11	Finland
11	Yugoslavia

European Champion 1939
Switzerland
