= 1937 Memorial Cup =

Canadian junior ice hockey championship

The Memorial Cup trophy

The 1937 Memorial Cup final was the 19th junior ice hockey championship of the Canadian Amateur Hockey Association (CAHA). The George Richardson Memorial Trophy champions Copper Cliff Redmen of the Northern Ontario Hockey Association in Eastern Canada competed against the Abbott Cup champions Winnipeg Monarchs of the Manitoba Junior Hockey League in Western Canada. This was the first Memorial Cup series to feature a best-of-five format. The games were held at Maple Leaf Gardens in Toronto, Ontario, Winnipeg won their second Memorial Cup, defeating Copper Cliff three games to one.

== Path to the final ==
The Winnipeg Monarchs defeated the Saskatoon Wesleys 5–2, 5–6, and 6–1 in a best-of-three series. The Copper Cliff Redmen defeated the Ottawa Rideaus in a two-game series to advance to the Memorial Cup Final in Toronto.

== Copper Cliff vs. Winnipeg ==
For Winnipeg, it was their third appearance in the final in five years. The Monarchs lost the 1932 final to the Sudbury Wolves and defeated the Sudbury Wolves in the 1935 final. The referees would be future National Hockey League (NHL) president Clarence Campbell and former NHL player Babe Dye.

In game one, the Redmen were down 3–0 with three minutes to play, but scored three to send the game to overtime. The Redmen won the game after ten minutes of overtime on a goal by Red Hamill while the Redmen were short-handed.

Described as "80 minutes of gruelling hockey", the second game saw the Monarchs prevail 6–5 over the Redmen to even the series. The Redmen took a two-goal lead into the second period, but owing to a string of penalties, the Monarchs scored three to take the lead. The Redmen scored to tie the game entering the third period. The Redmen scored and tried to hang on, but the Monarchs pressed the play and tied the score to send it to overtime. The first overtime of ten minutes passed without a goal, and the Redmen scored in the first minute of the second overtime. The Monarch then scored two to win the game.

In the third game, the Monarchs defeated the Redmen 2–1 to take a two games to one lead in the series. Winnipeg scored first in the first period, and the Redmen scored in the second to tie the score. The Monarchs then struck back to take the lead on a goal by Alfie Pike. The Monarchs then held off the Redmen the rest of the way.

In the fourth game, Winnipeg came out and dominated the Redmen and won the game 7–0 to take the series. Johnny McCready scored four goals for the Monarchs, which held the edge in speed over the heavier Redmen. 12,000 attended the game.

	Date		Score		Notes
1	April 10	Copper Cliff	4-3	Winnipeg	10' OT
2	April 12	Winnipeg	6-5	Copper Cliff	20' OT
3	April 14	Winnipeg	2-1	Copper Cliff	
4	April 17	Winnipeg	7-0	Copper Cliff	

The Memorial Cup was presented to the Monarchs by CAHA past-president E. A. Gilroy, who had also presented the trophy to the Monarchs in their 1935 Memorial Cup victory.

=== Winning roster ===
Jack Atcheson, Ami Clement, Ted Dent, Zenon Ferley, Jack Fox, Dick Kowcinak, Pete Langelle, Lucien Martel, Johnny McCready, A. Peletier, Alf Pike, Paul Rheault, Denny Robinson, Remi Vandaele. Coach: Harry Neil

Source: Toronto Daily Star

== International playoffs ==
The Canadian Amateur Hockey Association (CAHA) arranged an international tournament aimed to determine a world's amateur club team champion, hosted at Maple Leaf Gardens in Toronto, and invited the champions of the Allan Cup and the Memorial Cup, the Eastern Amateur Hockey League and the English National League. The tournament coincided with national teams playing at the 1937 Ice Hockey World Championships held at the same time in England. The world's amateur title was contested by the Wembley Lions, the Hershey Bears, the Sudbury Tigers, and the Winnipeg Monarchs. The schedule was a six-game double round-robin tournament from April 17 to 24, followed by a best-of-three game final series among the top two teams. CAHA representative W. A. Hewitt announced the shortening of the series due to poor attendance. The game between Hershey and Winnipeg was cancelled as both teams went home early, then tournament was completed by a best-of-three series between Sudbury and Wembley.
