= Dick Kowcinak =

Canadian ice hockey player

Dick Kowcinak (May 25, 1917 in Winnipeg, Manitoba — September 6, 2011) was a Canadian ice hockey left winger who played for the Trail Smoke Eaters who won the Allan Cup and the 1939 World Ice Hockey Championships. He lived in Sarnia, Ontario until his death, September 6, 2011.

== Awards and achievements ==
- Turnbull Cup MJHL Championship (1937)
- Memorial Cup Championship (1937)
- Allan Cup Championships (1938 & 1940)
- Ice Hockey World Championship (1939)
- IHL Scoring Champions (1948 & 1950)
- Honoured Member of the Manitoba Hockey Hall of Fame
