= Alberta-British Columbia Senior League =

Former senior men's ice hockey league

- Classification: Senior
- Sport: Ice hockey
- Founded: 1941
- Folded: 1942
- No. of teams: 4
- Country: Canada
- Most titles: Lethbridge Maple Leafs (1)

The Alberta-British Columbia Senior League is a defunct senior men's ice hockey league that operated for the 1941–42 season.

== History ==
The West Kootenay League was a senior level hockey league that operated from 1922 to 1923 through 1940–41; and the Alberta Senior Hockey League was a senior level league that operated between 1936 and 1941. Both leagues suspended their operations after the 1940–41 season due to World War II.

For the 1941–42 season, four teams from the two leagues (along with the upstart Red Deer Buffalos), merged to form the Alberta-British Columbia Senior League. Due to the pressures of the war, the league lasted just one season.

The West Kootenay League was resurrected for the 1945–46 season, and in 1946-47 the league expanded into the United States to become the Western International Hockey League.

== 1941-42 season ==
=== Standings ===
1941–42 season	GP	W	L	T	Pts	GF	GA	PIM
Calgary Stampeders	32	22	6	4	48	154	97	n/a
Lethbridge Maple Leafs	32	16	13	3	35	122	103	n/a
Kimberley Dynamiters	32	16	16	0	31	105	122	n/a
Trail Smoke Eaters	32	14	15	3	31	140	122	n/a
Red Deer Buffalos	32	7	25	0	14	89	166	n/a

=== Coaches ===
- Marty Burke (Calgary Stampeders)
- Riley "Moon" Mullen (Lethbridge Maple Leafs)
- Ken Campbell (Kimberley Dynamiters)
- Roy Bentley (Trail Smoke Eaters)
- Frank Coulson (Red Deer Buffalos)

== Playoffs ==
=== Semi finals ===
In the "Best of 5" semi-final series the Calgary Stampeders beat Trail Smoke Eaters 3 wins to none.

- Game 1: Calgary 8 Trail 3
- Game 2: Calgary 3 Trail 2
- Game 3: Calgary 5 Trail 1

In the "Best of 5" semi-final series Lethbridge Maple Leafs beat Kimberley Dynamiters 3 wins to none, 1 tie.

- Game 1: Lethbridge 2 Kimberley 2
- Game 2: Lethbridge 4 Kimberley 2
- Game 3: Lethbridge 4 Kimberley 1
- Game 4: Kimberley defaulted.

Note: Kimberley defaulted so that it could play in the 1941-42 British Columbia Senior Playoffs, which it did over Alberta's objections.

=== Final ===
In the final series Lethbridge Maple Leafs beat the Calgary Stampeders 3 wins to 2, 1 tie. The Lethbridge Maple Leafs advanced to the 1941-42 Western Canada Allan Cup Playoffs.

- Game 1: Calgary 2 Lethbridge 1
- Game 2: Lethbridge 7 Calgary 6
- Game 3: Calgary 4 Lethbridge 2
- Game 4: Lethbridge 2 Calgary 1
- Game 5: Calgary 2 Lethbridge 2
- Game 6: Lethbridge 2 Calgary 1
