= Elmer Piper =

Canadian ice hockey player and coach

- Born: October 9, 1906 Winnipeg, Manitoba, Canada
- Died: February 12, 1974 (aged 67) High River, AB, CAN
- Played for: Saskatoon Quakers
- National team: Canada
- Playing career: 1929–1935

Elmer Piper
Medal record

Men's ice hockey

Representing Canada

World Championships
Gold medal – first place	1934 Italy	

Elmer Ferdinand Piper (October 9, 1906 — February 12, 1974) was a Canadian ice hockey player and coach.

Piper was a member of the Saskatoon Quakers who represented Canada at the 1934 World Championships held in Milan, Italy, where they won Gold.

== See also ==
- List of Canadian national ice hockey team rosters
