= 1962 Allan Cup =

Canadian senior ice hockey championship

The Allan Cup trophy

The 1962 Allan Cup was the Canadian senior ice hockey championship for the 1961–62 senior "A" season. The event was hosted by the Trail Smoke Eaters and Trail, British Columbia. The 1962 playoff marked the 54th time that the Allan Cup has been awarded.

== Teams ==
- Montreal Olympics (Eastern Canadian Champions)
- Trail Smoke Eaters (Western Canadian Champions)

== Playdowns ==
=== Allan Cup Best-of-Seven Series ===
Trail Smoke Eaters 8 - Montreal Olympics 0
Montreal Olympics 5 - Trail Smoke Eaters 2
Trail Smoke Eaters 4 - Montreal Olympics 2
Trail Smoke Eaters 4 - Montreal Olympics 1
Trail Smoke Eaters 5 - Montreal Olympics 3

=== Eastern Playdowns ===
Quarter-final

Montreal Olympics defeated Amherst Ramblers 3-games-to-1

Amherst Ramblers 4 - Montreal Olympics 3
Montreal Olympics 3 - Amherst Ramblers 1
Montreal Olympics 2 - Amherst Ramblers 0
Montreal Olympics 8 - Amherst Ramblers 3

Semi-final

Montreal Olympics defeated Buckingham Aces 3-games-to-none

Montreal Olympics 2 - Buckingham Aces 0
Montreal Olympics 5 - Buckingham Aces 3
Montreal Olympics 8 - Buckingham Aces 5

Kapuskasing Kaps defeated Windsor Bulldogs 3-games-to-1

Kapuskasing Kaps 4 - Windsor Bulldogs 2
Windsor Bulldogs 5 - Kapuskasing Kaps 2
Kapuskasing Kaps 7 - Windsor Bulldogs 2
Kapuskasing Kaps 7 - Windsor Bulldogs 3

Final

Montreal Olympics defeated Kapuskasing Kaps 4-games-to-none

Montreal Olympics 7 - Kapuskasing Kaps 0
Montreal Olympics 3 - Kapuskasing Kaps 0
Montreal Olympics 3 - Kapuskasing Kaps 1
Montreal Olympics 3 - Kapuskasing Kaps 2

=== Western Playdowns ===
Quarter-final

Winnipeg Maroons defeated Port Arthur Bearcats 4-games-to-1

Winnipeg Maroons 6 - Port Arthur Bearcats 0
Winnipeg Maroons 4 - Port Arthur Bearcats 3
Port Arthur Bearcats 2 - Winnipeg Maroons 1
Winnipeg Maroons 5 - Port Arthur Bearcats 4
Winnipeg Maroons 4 - Port Arthur Bearcats 1

Semi-final

Trail Smoke Eaters defeated Calgary Adderson Builders 3-games-to-none

Trail Smoke Eaters 15 - Calgary Adderson Builders 1
Trail Smoke Eaters 8 - Calgary Adderson Builders 4
Trail Smoke Eaters 7 - Calgary Adderson Builders 6

Saskatoon Quakers defeated Winnipeg Maroons 4-games-to-2

Winnipeg Maroons 7 - Saskatoon Quakers 3
Winnipeg Maroons 4 - Saskatoon Quakers 3
Saskatoon Quakers 6 - Winnipeg Maroons 2
Saskatoon Quakers 5 - Winnipeg Maroons 4
Saskatoon Quakers 9 - Winnipeg Maroons 3
Saskatoon Quakers 6 - Winnipeg Maroons 3

Final

Trail Smoke Eaters defeated Saskatoon Quakers 4-games-to-3

Trail Smoke Eaters 6 - Saskatoon Quakers 0
Saskatoon Quakers 6 - Trail Smoke Eaters 4
Trail Smoke Eaters 6 - Saskatoon Quakers 2
Saskatoon Quakers 6 - Trail Smoke Eaters 4
Saskatoon Quakers 6 - Trail Smoke Eaters 3
Trail Smoke Eaters 7 - Saskatoon Quakers 6
Trail Smoke Eaters 6 - Saskatoon Quakers 0
