= Rossland Miners =

Former ice hockey team in Canada

The Rossland Miners were a senior men's ice hockey team from Rossland, British Columbia. The team played in the West Kootenay League for 12 years in the 1920s and 1930s.

The Miners won the league title and British Columbia Senior Championships in both 1924 and 1925.

== Season-by-season results ==
=== West Kootenay League (1923-30) ===
Season	Games	Won	Lost	Tied	Points	GoalsFor	GoalsAgainst	Standing	Playoffs	
1923-24	7	5	2	0	10	23	15	1st	no playoffs, Won BC, Lost West Quarter Final	
1924-25	8	4	4	0	8	-	-	Tied 1st	Won Final, Won BC, Lost West Semi Final	
1925-26	8	4	4	0	8	21	18	2nd	Lost Final	
1926-27	-	-	-	-	-	-	-	2nd	Lost Final	
1927-28	12	2	9	1	5	24	58	3rd	out of playoffs	
1928-29	12	5	6	1	11	31	35	2nd	Lost Final	
1929-30	7	5	2	0	10	17	16	1st	Defaulted Final

=== West Kootenay League (1933-38) ===
Season	Games	Won	Lost	Tied	Points 	GoalsFor	GoalsAgainst	Standing	Playoffs	
1933-34	18	3	14	1	7	-	-	4th	out of playoffs	
1934-35	16	2	14	0	4	25	89	3rd	Lost Semi Final	
1935-36	-	-	-	-	-	-	-	4th	Lost Quarter Final	
1936-37	14	3	10	1	.250	-	-	4th	out of playoffs	
1937-38	24	4	19	1	9	80	174	3rd West	out of playoffs
