= West Kootenay League =

Defunct senior men's ice hockey league in British Columbia

- Classification: Senior
- Sport: Ice hockey
- Founded: 1922
- Folded: 1941
- Region: British Columbia, Canada
- Most titles: Trail Smoke Eaters (9)

The West Kootenay League, also referred to as the West Kootenay Hockey League (WKHL), is a defunct senior men's ice hockey league that operated in eastern British Columbia from 1922 to 1941, and also during the 1945–46 season. In 1946-47 the league expanded to Spokane and Los Angeles and became the Western International Hockey League.

In its 20 years of operation, the West Kootenay League won every British Columbia Senior Championship (Savage Cup) after its first season (1922–23) and teams from this league won the Allan Cup twice.

== History ==
The West Kootenay League operated from 1922–23 through 1940–41. Many of the players resisted the idea of turning professional because, with the promise of high paying mining jobs, they had secure jobs for life and were making as much, if not more, than players in the NHL.

In 1931 the Kimberley Dynamiters joined the West Kootenay League, beginning an immediate rivalry with the Trail Smoke Eaters, a strong player in of senior British Columbia hockey.

In 1941 the league suspended operations for three seasons due to World War II, and its teams merged with the Alberta Senior League to become the Alberta-British Columbia Senior League for the 1941–42 season. The West Kootenay League was resurrected for the 1945–46 season, and in 1946–47 the league expanded to Spokane and Los Angeles and became the Western International Hockey League.

== List of champions ==
- 1922–23 Nelson Hockey Club
- 1923–24 Rossland Miners
- 1924–25 Trail Hockey Club
- 1925–26 Trail Hockey Club
- 1926–27 Trail Hockey Club
- 1927–28 Trail Hockey Club
- 1928–29 Trail Smoke Eaters
- 1929–30 Trail Smoke Eaters
- 1930–31 Trail Smoke Eaters
- 1931–32 Trail Smoke Eaters
- 1932–33 Trail Smoke Eaters
- 1933–34 Kimberley Dynamiters
- 1934–35 Kimberley Dynamiters
- 1935–36 Kimberley Dynamiters (won the Allan Cup)
- 1936–37 Nelson Maple Leafs
- 1937–38 Trail Smoke Eaters (won the Allan Cup)
- 1938–39 Kimberley Dynamiters
- 1939–40 Trail Smoke Eaters
- 1940–41 Trail Smoke Eaters
- 1945–46 Trail Smoke Eaters
