= Kimberley Dynamiters (WKHL) =

Defunct Canadian senior ice hockey team

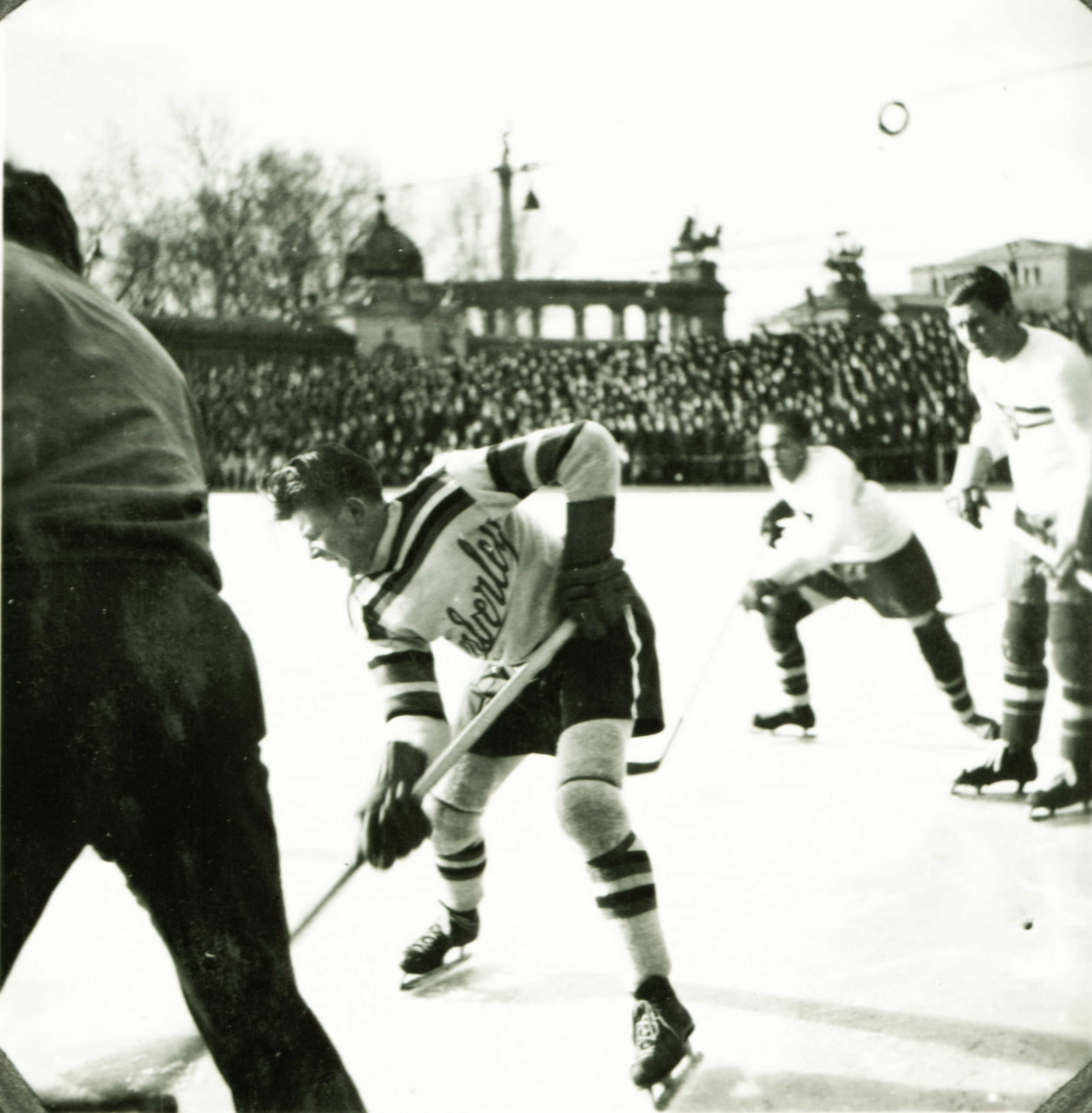
- Kimberley Dynamiters, 1937 in Budapest
- Sport: Ice hockey
- Founded: 1922
- Folded: 1941
- League: West Kootenay Hockey League
- Location: Kimberley, British Columbia
- Championships: 1
- League titles: 1

The Kimberley Dynamiters are a defunct senior ice hockey club that played prior to World War II in the West Kootenay Hockey League (WKHL). In 1936 the Kimberley Dynamiters won the Allan Cup, defeating the Sudbury Falcons in the best of 3 final series with a score of 2 games to 0. The team went on to win the 1937 World Ice Hockey Championships.

The 1935-1936 Kimberley Dynamiters was inducted as a Team into the BC Sports Hall of Fame in 1976.

== History ==
Kimberley was home to the Sullivan Mine, a large lead and zinc operation. The mining company, Cominco, recruited hockey players for the Kimberley Dynamiters to compete against rivals from Trail, offering high wages and steady employment. During the 1930s, players for the Dynamiters earner higher salaries than typical NHL players, making the West Kootenay League a highly competitive circuit in Canadian senior hockey.

The West Kootenay League operated from 1922-23 through 1940-41. Many of the players resisted the idea of turning professional because it limited their time to work a stable and well-paid mining job. They would also have to take a pay cut if they moved to the NHL.

In 1931, the Kimberley Dynamiters joined the West Kootenay League, and began a rivalry with the always-strong Trail Smoke Eaters, a renowned team of senior British Columbia hockey.

The Dynamiters won the Savage Cup, as British Columbia's Senior AAA hockey champion, in 1934 and 1935 and 1936, and captured their first Allan Cup in 1936 by defeating the Sudbury Falcons in the best of 3 final series 2 games to 0.

The Allan Cup title won the Dynamiters the right to represent Canada at the 1937 World Ice Hockey Championships, held that year in London, England. At this world tournament the Kimberley Dynamiters recorded a perfect record of nine wines, with no losses, to decisively win the title of World Champions.

In 1941 the WKHL league suspended operations for three seasons due to World War II, and its teams merged with the Alberta Senior League to become the Alberta-British Columbia Senior League for the 1941-42 season. The West Kootenay League was resurrected for the 1945-46 season, and in 1946-47 the league expanded to Spokane and Los Angeles and became the Western International Hockey League.

== 1937 World Ice Hockey Championships team roster ==
Kimberley Dynamiters
Head coach: John Achtzener
Tom Almack
Fred Botterill
Fred Burnett
Ken Campbell
George Goble
Eric Hornquist
Doug Keiver
James Kemp
Paul Kozak
Hugo Mackie
Ralph Reading
Harry Robertson
George Wilson

== See also ==
- Alberta-British Columbia Senior League
