= 1938 Allan Cup =

Canadian senior ice hockey championship

The Allan Cup trophy

The 1938 Allan Cup was the Canadian senior ice hockey championship for the 1937–38 season.

== Final ==
Best of 5

- Trail 6 Cornwall 4
- Trail 8 Cornwall 2
- Cornwall 2 Trail 1
- Trail 5 Cornwall 1

Trail Smoke Eaters beat Cornwall Flyers 3-1 on series.
