= 1940 Allan Cup =

Canadian senior ice hockey championship

The Allan Cup trophy

The 1940 Allan Cup was the Canadian senior ice hockey championship for the 1939–40 season.

== Final ==
Best of 5

- Kirkland Lake 8 Calgary 5
- Kirkland Lake 9 Calgary 1
- Kirkland Lake 7 Calgary 1

Kirkland Lake Blue Devils beat Calgary Stampeders 3-0 on series.
